= The Jetsons Meet the Flintstones =

1987 animated crossover made-for-television film

- Genre: Comedy; Science fiction; Fantasy
- Written by: Don Nelson; Arthur Alsberg
- Directed by: Don Lusk
- Starring: George O'Hanlon; Henry Corden; Penny Singleton; Jean Vander Pyl; Don Messick; Mel Blanc; Julie McWhirter; Janet Waldo; Daws Butler; John Stephenson; Jon Bauman; Hamilton Camp; Frank Welker; Brenda Vaccaro; Patric Zimmerman
- Composers: Sven Libaek; Hoyt Curtin (music from The Jetsons)
- Country of origin: United States

Production
- Executive producers: William Hanna; Joseph Barbera
- Producers: Bob Hathcock; Berny Wolf
- Running time: 92 minutes
- Production company: Hanna-Barbera Productions

Original release
- Network: Syndication
- Release: November 15, 1987

The Jetsons Meet the Flintstones is a 1987 animated crossover made-for-television film produced by Hanna-Barbera for syndication as part of the Hanna-Barbera Superstars 10 series. The two-hour special stars the casts of the Hanna-Barbera sitcoms The Flintstones and The Jetsons as they cross paths following a time travel experiment gone wrong.

== Plot ==
In the space age, while Elroy is busy working on a time machine, George Jetson comes to Mr. Spacely's office for a serious discussion. Spacely's rival, Cogswell, has been stealing his business ideas, putting their jobs in jeopardy. Mr. Spacely wrongfully blames George, suspecting that he works for Cogswell. So he orders him to spy on Cogswell to clear his name and avoid getting fired. George finds out that Cogswell's robot computer, S.A.R.A., has been seducing Spacely's robot computer named R.U.D.I. into leaking the boss's secrets. George tries to report this to Spacely, but R.U.D.I. sabotages his efforts.

In the Stone Age, Wilma and Betty try to convince Fred Flintstone to have their vacation arranged in Honolurock (Honolulu), but Fred ignores their efforts. Later, at work, he tells Barney Rubble about planning their vacation somewhere even better. He wishes to attend the poker tournament being held at the Water Buffalo lodge with meetings (where the boys are members) later that day, however Mr. Slate shows up, informing the duo that they must work the late shift because they're going on vacation. Not only that, but Turk Tarpit, Slate's business rival and nemesis, has been outproducing them. Fred and Barney disobey the boss's orders and head for the poker tournament anyway, but after seeing that Mr. Slate is playing there too, they disguise themselves. Fred plays against his boss, but loses. A spider exposes Barney, and ultimately Fred. Furious that they deceived and disobeyed him, Slate fires the duo. Meanwhile, back in the future, Elroy completes his time machine. The Jetsons decide to use it to take a trip to the 25th Century for relaxation.

Without a job, the Flintstones and Rubbles are forced to settle for a camping holiday. As Fred and Barney set up the tent, the Jetsons arrive from the future. Fred and George eventually communicate, and the families become friends. Fred is amazed by George's futuristic gadgets. He decides to use them to help Mr. Slate in a competition at the upcoming company picnic. There, he introduces George to Mr. Slate, claiming that George is a distant cousin. The boss is reluctant at first to trust him, but since Turk Tarpit's cheating has set him back, Mr. Slate accepts their help in exchange for getting their jobs back. George and Fred use future technology to help Mr. Slate win several games, but in the last event, Astro and Dino's actions cause Tarpit to become the winner. In the end, Mr. Slate once again fires Fred and Barney.

While Mr. Spacely continues to vent over his failing business, Henry Orbit and Rosie the Robot Maid assemble a "time machine retriever" to bring the Jetsons back. But when they turn it on, the time machine returns with the Flintstones instead. Upon seeing they really are cavemen, Mr. Spacely introduces them to the press.

Stuck in the past, George asks Mr. Slate for a job. He initially refuses, but when Tarpit offers George work, Mr. Slate immediately makes George his partner. Soon after, George becomes famous. Using their newfound fame and riches, the Jetsons buy multiple local businesses and are soon overwhelmed. Meanwhile, Mr. Spacely makes Fred the spokes-caveman for his company, but R.U.D.I. leaks the information to S.A.R.A. When Mr. Spacely introduces Fred to some important investors, Cogswell is introducing Barney instead, leading to a rift in his and Barney's friendship. Meanwhile, Rosie requests R.U.D.I. to help Henry try to fix the time machine to find the Jetsons. S.A.R.A. appears, demanding that R.U.D.I. get rid of Rosie before she departs. However, R.U.D.I. agrees to do whatever he can to get the Jetsons back, leaving S.A.R.A. for good. They fix the time machine, and Rosie is transported to the Stone Age where she finds her family.

Now able to return home, the Jetsons leave, taking Fred's car with them, after Judy says goodbye to a teen idol named Iggy. Mr. Spacely concocts a plan to use Fred's car as a model for futuristic replicas. Cogswell sends his robotic dog named Sentro to steal this information since S.A.R.A. is no longer useful when she tells him that R.U.D.I. broke up with her and told her off. The two families, Astro, and Dino manage to stop Sentro, destroying the evidence he had collected. Mr. Spacely's business of selling Stone Age style cars becomes successful, and he even agrees to sell one to Cogswell. Spacely warns Cosgwell, however, that if he copies any part of it, Spacely will sue him and take over his business. Fred and Barney repair their friendship, Spacely lets George keep his job, and George offers his partnership with Mr. Slate to Fred and Barney to give them their jobs back. Just as they are about to leave for home, Elroy tells them the time machine is broken beyond repair now. Fortunately, they return to the Stone Age because Fred's car absorbed the time machine's "quadra-potents." The Flintstones and the Rubbles then bid a fond farewell to the Jetsons, and appear to be sent back to the Stone Age, although this is not shown.

== Voice cast ==
- Henry Corden as Fred Flintstone
- George O'Hanlon as George Jetson
- Mel Blanc as Barney Rubble, Dino the Dinosaur, and Mr. Spacely
- Jean Vander Pyl as Wilma Flintstone and Rosie the Robot Maid
- Penny Singleton as Jane Jetson
- Julie Dees as Betty Rubble, Jet Rivers, Investor, Panelist, and Harem Girl
- Janet Waldo as Judy Jetson and S.A.R.A.
- Daws Butler as Elroy Jetson, Cogswell, and Henry Orbit
- John Stephenson as Mr. Slate
- Hamilton Camp as Turk Tarpit
- Don Messick as Astro the Space Mutt, R.U.D.I. and M.A.C.C.
- Jon Bauman as Iggy
- Brenda Vaccaro as DiDi
- Frank Welker as Dan Rathmoon, Johnny, and Mr. Goldbrick
- Patric Zimmerman as additional voices
- Catherine Thompson as additional voices
- Howard Morris as additional voices

== Home media ==
The movie has been released on VHS four times, first by Worldvision Home Video on April 7, 1988, by Hanna-Barbera Home Video on October 20, 1989, by Kid Klassics the same year, and by Warner Home Video on July 3, 2001. On June 14, 2011, Warner Archive released The Jetsons Meet the Flintstones on DVD in NTSC picture format with all-region encoding, for the very first time as part of their Hanna-Barbera Classics Collection. This is a Manufacture-on-Demand (MOD) release available exclusively through Warner's online store and Amazon.com.

On August 24, 2017, Boomerang's streaming service added the film to its video on demand.

On August 4, 2020, Warner Bros. Home Entertainment gave it its first wide release as part of the DVD collection The Flintstones: 2 Movies & 5 Specials.

On October 13, 2020, it was included as a bonus feature on the DVD set The Jetsons: The Complete Series.

On February 20, 2024, the film was released in HD on Blu-ray as part of a Hanna-Barbera Superstars 10 boxset through Warner Archive.

== Video game ==
In The Flintstones: The Rescue of Dino & Hoppy, a 1991 NES game there is one part where the Flintstones reach a time machine and travel to the Jetsons era.

A 1994 Philips CD-i game with a similar premise called Flintstones/Jetsons Time Warp was released in Europe. "A time machine warps Fred Flintstone into the future and George Jetson into the past!"

== Follow-up film ==
- Rockin' with Judy Jetson was released in 1988.
- The Flintstone Kids' "Just Say No" Special was released in 1988.
