= The Jetsons & WWE: Robo-WrestleMania! =

- DVD cover featuring The Jetsons and Big Show on the foreground
- Directed by: Anthony Bell
- Written by: Jed Elinoff; Scott Thomas
- Based on: The Jetsons by William Hanna and Joseph Barbera
- Produced by: Brandon Vietti
- Starring: Jeff Bergman; Grey Griffin; Trevor Devall; Danica McKellar; Frank Welker; Tress MacNeille; Roman Reigns; Big Show; Seth Rollins; Alicia Fox; The Usos; Sheamus; Vince McMahon
- Edited by: Cris Mertens
- Music by: Tim Kelly
- Production companies: Warner Bros. Animation; Hanna-Barbera Cartoons; WWE Studios
- Distributed by: Warner Home Video
- Release dates: February 28, 2017 (Digital); March 14, 2017 (DVD)
- Running time: 82 minutes
- Country: United States
- Language: English

The Jetsons & WWE: Robo-WrestleMania! is a 2017 American direct-to-video animated film starring The Jetsons. It is the fourth and final co-production between Warner Bros. Animation and WWE Studios. It was released on February 28, 2017, on Digital HD and on March 14, 2017, on home video. It is the first major The Jetsons production in over 27 years since the 1990 film Jetsons: The Movie (and after the deaths of George O'Hanlon, Penny Singleton, Janet Waldo, Mel Blanc, Don Messick and Jean Vander Pyl), and also the first since the two web shorts, Father and Son Day and The Best Son, by John Kricfalusi's Spümcø, the first without either the original creators William Hanna and Joseph Barbera (who died respectively in 2001 and 2006) and the first since the Hanna-Barbera studios foreclosed and absorbed into Warner Bros. Animation in 2001. As all of them had died over the years, none of the original voice cast returned for this film. Jeff Bergman (who replaced O'Hanlon and Blanc after their deaths for additional scenes in Jetsons: The Movie) and Frank Welker (who was a cast member of the show's revival in the 1980s) are the only cast members from previous productions to return.

== Plot ==
On modern day Earth, after a live WWE show in Denver, Colorado, Big Show is scheduled to face Sheamus for the WWE Championship in Albuquerque on WWE SmackDown the next night, but Mr. McMahon cancels the title match due to a snowstorm. Enraged by the cancellation, Big Show storms out of the arena and flies a plane through the blizzard only to be lost in the storm when his plane stalls.

Later, George Jetson is assigned by Mr. Spacely to supervise a project that involves robots drilling through the surface of the Earth. When the robots report an obstruction on their drilling path, George investigates and discovers a frozen Big Show. After George brings him home and thaws him out, Big Show discovers that he was frozen.

The next day, Elroy brings Big Show to his school for show and tell. Here, Big Show discovers that the WWE still exists, but is now a robot wrestling promotion. He steals the robot remote controller from Mr. McMoon, the descendant of Mr. McMahon, and uses the robot wrestlers to take over Orbit City.

The Jetsons escape and time travel to the Albuquerque show. George interferes with the Sheamus vs. Seth Rollins match, resulting in Roman Reigns, The Usos and Alicia Fox running in to get him out of the ring. Following the ruckus, George convinces Mr. McMahon and the WWE Superstars to travel with his family back to the future to save Orbit City only to end up returning one month later with Orbit City now under Big Show's complete control. Sheamus challenges Big Show to a winner-takes-all match while George is captured and imprisoned along with the other human citizens.

As the WWE Superstars battle their robot counterparts, George has the humans band together and revolt against Big Show, parking their flying cars around him to ensure a fair fight between Sheamus and Big Show. Sheamus knocks Big Show out with a Brogue Kick. Instead of pinning Big Show, Sheamus convinces him to continue their battle in the present.

In the aftermath of the battle, the WWE Superstars return to their time while Spacely Sprockets gets the contract to rebuild Orbit City with George once again assigned to supervise the robot workers.

After the city returns to normal, the Jetsons attend WrestleMania to watch the new human WWE Superstars enter the ring.

== Voice cast ==
- Jeff Bergman as George Jetson, & Mr. Spacely
- Grey Griffin as Jane Jetson
- Trevor Devall as Elroy Jetson
- Danica McKellar as Judy Jetson
- Tress MacNeille as Rosie the Robot Maid
- Frank Welker as Astro
- Roman Reigns as Himself, & Roman Reigns Bot
- Big Show as Himself, & Big Show Bot
- Seth Rollins as Himself, & Reactor Rollins
- Alicia Fox as Herself, & Alicia Fox Bot
- The Usos as Themselves, & Usobots
- Sheamus as Himself, & Sheamus Bot
- Mr. McMahon as Himself, & Mr. McMoon
- Michael Cole as Himself
- Stardust as Stardust Bot
- Dolph Ziggler as Dolph Ziggler Bot
- Eric Bauza as Rolf Rodriguez
- JB Blanc as Usher Robot
- Tania Gunadi as Gladys the Receptionist
- Will Friedle as Mayor Mercury
- Kevin Michael Richardson as Drill Bot
