= Hanna-Barbera's 50th: A Yabba Dabba Doo Celebration =

1989 American live-action/animated television special

- Also known as: A Yabba Dabba Doo Celebration: 50 Years of Hanna-Barbera
- Genre: Live-action; Variety show
- Based on: Characters by Hanna-Barbera Productions
- Written by: Marshall Flaum
- Directed by: Marshall Flaum
- Starring: Tony Danza (Host); Annie Potts (Co-host); Whoopi Goldberg; Betty White; Sammy Davis Jr. Tommy Lasorda; Jonathan Winters; Phyllis Diller; Valerie Harper; Shari Belafonte; Joe Ferguson; Tiffany
- Voices of: Greg Burson; Henry Corden; Don Messick; Mel Blanc; George O'Hanlon; Greg Berg; Casey Kasem; John Stephenson; Jean Vander Pyl; Penny Singleton
- Country of origin: United States

Production
- Executive producers: William Hanna; Joseph Barbera
- Producer: Marshall Flaum
- Running time: 94 minutes
- Production companies: Hanna-Barbera Productions; Turner Entertainment Co. (Tom and Jerry and Droopy Dog)

Original release
- Network: TNT
- Release: July 17, 1989

Hanna-Barbera's 50th: A Yabba Dabba Doo Celebration (also known as A Yabba Dabba Doo Celebration: 50 Years of Hanna-Barbera) is a 1989 American live-action/animated television special written, directed and produced by Marshall Flaum, which premiered on TNT on July 17, 1989. It is hosted by Tony Danza, along with Annie Potts; it also stars Whoopi Goldberg, Betty White, Sammy Davis Jr., Tommy Lasorda, Jonathan Winters, Phyllis Diller, Valerie Harper, Shari Belafonte, Joe Ferguson and Tiffany.

== Summary ==
The special is hosted by that night's guest stars Tony Danza and Annie Potts celebrating 50 years of William Hanna and Joseph Barbera'spartnership in animation. This is the first animated project to be broadcast in Dolby Surround sound system.

It covers their years working for the Metro-Goldwyn-Mayer cartoon studio and then the history of Hanna-Barbera, which was set up in 1957. It features footage and clips from the studio's various cartoons along with new animated/live-action wraparounds and a behind-the-scenes segment on the then-upcoming Jetsons: The Movie.

The special was dedicated to the loving memory of Daws Butler, who died during its production, and it was also the last television and film project of both Mel Blanc and George O'Hanlon, who died before the special's telecast. Turner Broadcasting System, which owned TNT, would later purchase Hanna-Barbera in 1991.

== Cartoon characters ==
Among the cartoon characters that appear in this special are the following:

- Astro
- Atom Ant
- Augie Doggie and Doggie Daddy
- Baba Looey
- Bamm-Bamm Rubble
- Barney Rubble
- Betty Rubble
- Boo-Boo Bear
- Brainy Smurf
- Breezly Bruin
- Choo-Choo
- Cindy Bear
- Dick Dastardly
- Ding-A-Ling Wolf
- Dino
- Dum Dum
- Elroy Jetson
- Fancy-Fancy
- Fluid-Man
- Fred Flintstone
- George Jetson
- Hokey Wolf
- Hong Kong Phooey
- Huckleberry Hound
- Jane Jetson
- Jerry Mouse
- Judy Jetson
- Magilla Gorilla
- Mildew Wolf
- Muttley
- Papa Smurf
- Pebbles Flintstone
- Peter Potamus
- Pixie and Dixie
- Punkin' Puss
- Quick Draw McGraw
- Rosie the Robot Maid
- Ruff and Reddy
- Scooby-Doo
- Scrappy-Doo
- Secret Squirrel
- Shaggy Rogers
- Smurfette
- Snagglepuss
- Sneezly Seal
- Snooper and Blabber
- Snuffles
- Squiddly Diddly
- Tom Cat
- Top Cat
- Touché Turtle
- Wally Gator
- Wilma Flintstone
- Winsome Witch
- Yogi Bear

== Celebrities ==
- Tony Danza (host)
- Annie Potts (co-host)
- Betty White
- Joe Ferguson
- Jonathan Winters
- Phyllis Diller
- Sammy Davis Jr.
- Shari Belafonte
- Tiffany
- Tommy Lasorda
- Valerie Harper
- Victor Borge
- Whoopi Goldberg
- Big Bird

== Voices ==
- Greg Burson as Yogi Bear, Huckleberry Hound, Quick Draw McGraw, Snagglepuss and Snuffles
- Danny Goldman as Brainy Smurf
- Casey Kasem as Shaggy Rogers
- Don Messick as Scooby-Doo, Boo-Boo Bear, Muttley and Papa Smurf
- Greg Berg as Baba Looey and Augie Doggie
- Henry Corden as Fred Flintstone
- Jean Vander Pyl as Wilma Flintstone
- George O'Hanlon as George Jetson
- John Stephenson as Doggie Daddy and Snooper
- Mel Blanc as Barney Rubble
- Lucille Bliss as Smurfette
- Penny Singleton as Jane Jetson
