= List of Spümcø works =

Spümcø, Inc. was an American animation studio based in Los Angeles, California. The studio produced three traditionally animated series, two flash animated cartoon series, two music videos, five animated shorts, and a comic book. The company also went on to produce content for several animated spots and commercials. It has won several awards, including an Annie Award for Best Animated Short Subject, for the Björk music video, "I Miss You".

On August 11, 1991, The Ren and Stimpy Show premiered on Nickelodeon, serving as the company's flagship property. After the company was fired by Nickelodeon in September 1992, Games Animation took over production, hired most of the company's employees and continued producing the series for three seasons. In 2001, 10 years after The Ren and Stimpy Show had premiered, Kricfalusi then created an animated series for Fox Kids in the United States and Teletoon in Canada, The Ripping Friends. The series premiered on September 22, 2001, and would last for only one season. In 2002, when Kricfalusi received a phone call from Spike (now Paramount Network), he decided to revive Ren & Stimpy in the more adult-oriented series, Ren & Stimpy "Adult Party Cartoon". The series premiered on June 1, 2003, with the banned Nickelodeon series' episode, "Man's Best Friend", and a total of three original episodes aired on Spike. The show was cancelled in July 2003, one month after it premiered.

During 1997, John Kricfalusi and his staff at Spümcø launched their web site, which aimed to deliver cartoons to audiences without television networks' censorship. Kricfalusi decided to use George Liquor, a cartoon character he created, to star in the Flash Internet cartoon series, The Goddamn George Liquor Program, which Kricfalusi created. The series premiered on October 15, 1997, and was the first cartoon series to be produced exclusively for the Internet. In 1999, Spümcø created their second Internet-only cartoon series, Weekend Pussy Hunt. The series would last for 12 episodes, with 4 unfinished cartoons due to budget problems.

In 1999, Spümcø produced and animated a Yogi Bear TV special titled Boo Boo Runs Wild, which premiered on September 24, 1999, on Cartoon Network. The animated short focused on Yogi Bear's sidekick, Boo Boo Bear, who becomes fed up with the rules of man and decides to return to his natural bear roots. Though it focused primarily on Yogi and Boo Boo, it was titled as a "Ranger Smith cartoon." Alongside Boo Boo Runs Wild, a second "Ranger Smith" cartoon aired, titled A Day in the Life of Ranger Smith. Between 2001 and 2002, two Flash-animated Jetsons cartoons were created exclusively for Cartoon Network's official web site: The Jetsons: Father & Son Day and The Jetsons: The Best Son. A third Yogi Bear cartoon, titled Boo Boo and the Man, premiered in 2002 on Cartoon Network's official web site. It was animated in Macromedia Flash.

In 1997, John Kricfalusi directed a music video for Björk titled "I Miss You", a single that was released the same year. It was animated by the entire staff at Spümcø. It premiered on MTV, as well as Canada's MuchMusic channel. In 2001, Spümcø produced their second music video production for Tenacious D, "Fuck Her Gently". The video was produced in Macromedia Flash, and was directed by Gabe Swarr, who was also a producer for The Goddamn George Liquor Program and Weekend Pussy Hunt.

Although the company originally closed down in 2005 due to a lawsuit from Bob Jaques, it was revealed in 2016 on Tumblr that Kricfalusi and Cartoon Network storyboard artist Gabe Del Valle were reopening the company, under the name Spümtwø, to produce bigger projects and are now looking for employees. The new studio's first project was stated to be a Ren and Stimpy short film slated to appear in front of The SpongeBob Movie: Sponge on the Run, with Bob Camp and Bill Wray slated to return to work with the crew, and a potential possibility of reviving the series. However, Kricfalusi denied all of this his Twitter post on February 2017. However, an animatic of the short was released as an easter egg on the Cans without Labels DVD in May 2019, revealing it as a crossover with SpongeBob SquarePants.

== Animation productions ==
=== Televised animated series ===
Title	Date of Premiere	Seasons	Co-production with	Original broadcasting station	Notes
The Ren & Stimpy Show	August 11, 1991	5	Games Animation	Nickelodeon	Seasons 1-2 only; remaining seasons were produced by Games Animation (now known as Nickelodeon Animation Studio).
The Ripping Friends	September 22, 2001	1	Cambium; Animagic	Fox Kids (United States), Teletoon (Canada)	
Ren & Stimpy "Adult Party Cartoon"	June 26, 2003	1	Spike Animation Studios	Spike	An adult-oriented revival of The Ren & Stimpy Show.

=== Internet-exclusive series and shorts ===
Title	Date of Premiere	Co-production with	Broadcasting method (Web site)
The Goddamn George Liquor Program	October 15, 1997	N/A	Spumco.com (now defunct)
What Pee Boners Are For	1998	N/A	Spumco.com (now defunct)
A George Liquor Christmas	1998	N/A	Spumco.com (now defunct)
Weekend Pussy Hunt	1999	MSN	Spumco.com (now defunct); IceBox.com

=== Cartoon Network short films ===
Title	Date of Premiere	Director(s)
Boo Boo Runs Wild	September 24, 1999	John Kricfalusi
A Day in the Life of Ranger Smith	September 24, 1999	John Kricfalusi
The Jetsons: Father & Son Day	March 19, 2001	Gabe Swarr
The Jetsons: The Best Son	March 10, 2002	Gabe Swarr
Boo Boo and the Man	April 25, 2002	John Kricfalusi

=== Feature films ===
Title	Release date	Director	Note
Troop Beverly Hills	March 24, 1989	Jeff Kanew	Design the opening titles and credits with Kroyer Films.

=== Music videos ===
Year	Title	Artist	Director(s)
1997	"I Miss You"	Björk	John Kricfalusi
2001	"Fuck Her Gently"	Tenacious D	Gabe Swarr

=== Television and online commercials ===
Year	Title	Client(s)	Summary and notes	Ref(s)
1992	"Peacock Project"	NBC	Two 10-second idents. The first ident was originally produced as a 17-second one, and later cut in 10-second and 4-second versions. At the end of the first one, a speaker says "You're watching NBC."	
1995	"Fanta Cave"	The Coca-Cola Company	Never-materialized commercial starring Jimmy the Idiot Boy, a character created by John Kricfalusi. Produced in association with Will Vinton Productions.	
1996	"Lick"	Aoki's Pizza	Commercial starring characters Jimmy the Idiot Boy and Sody Pop, created by John Kricfalusi.	
1996	"You Want Some?"	Barq's Root Beer	Commercial starring characters George Liquor and Jimmy the Idiot Boy, created by John Kricfalusi.	
1997	"Big Bad Wolf"	Nike	Inspired by the fairy tales Little Red Riding Hood and The Three Little Pigs. Named by Animation Magazine, as one of the best animated spots of 1997. A commercial similarly based on the latter one in which the wolf is trying to blow down the Pigs' house, was storyboarded by John Kricfalusi upon request by ADT, but was later materialized by Red Rover Studios.	
1997	"Rooster"	Village Pantry		
1998	"Cadbury Land"	Cadbury		
1998	"Boys Big Pockets" "Boys Hooded Fleece" "Girls Flare Jeans" "Girls Curly Fleece"	Old Navy	"Boys Big Pockets" and "Boys Hooded Fleece" won a 1998 Annie Award for Best Animated Television Commercial. "Girls Curly Fleece" was also nominated for a 1999 Annie Award in the same category.	
1999	"Treat Your Dog Right"	Wagwells Dog Treats		
1999	"Rice Patooties"		Commercial starring Wally Whimsy, a character created by John Kricfalusi. Animated in Flash.	
1999	"Quisp"	Quaker Oats	Animated in Flash.	
2000	"Tony Mora Pizza"	The RequestLines System	Starring Stephen Worth as Mr. DJ. Animated in Flash by Tony Mora.	

=== Video games ===
Title	Release	Developer	Publisher	Note
Yoake no Mariko	December 6, 2001	Sony Computer Entertainment Japan	Sony Computer Entertainment	Character designs and animation
Yoake no Mariko 2nd Act	January 24, 2002	Sony Computer Entertainment Japan	Sony Computer Entertainment	Character designs and animation
Go! Go! Hypergrind	November 18, 2003	Atlus	Atlus	Character designs

=== Unrealized projects ===
Title	Announcement date	Creator	Medium	Note
Ren and Stimpy untitled film	1993	John Kricfalusi	Animated feature film	Nickelodeon and 20th Century Fox made a three-picture deal agreement to produce original movies and ones based on Nickelodeon products, with Ren & Stimpy a potential idea. Of the Nicktoons made as feature films, Ren & Stimpy was never made, with an idea of a "warm and fuzzy" family film adaptation of the show's "cynical and gross" style of humor deemed unfit. Plus, would have likely ran into creative issues with creator, who would be forced out several months after the deal was announced. Fox's film deal with Nick expired when Viacom purchased the network, along with Paramount Pictures, in 1994 leaving Paramount to distribute and co-produce the network's theatrically released films.
Untitled The World's Manliest Men film	1993	John Kricfalusi	Animated feature film	The film wasn't picked up, but the characters were used in The Ripping Friends.
Terrytoons animated shorts	1994	John Kricfalusi	Animated shorts	A revival pitch series of shorts for CBS, which would feature such characters as Mighty Mouse, Gandy Goose, Sourpuss and Deputy Dawg. This would have also been Kricfalusi's second effort at a Terrytoons property following Mighty Mouse: The New Adventures.
He-Hog the Atomic Pig	1995	John Kricfalusi	Animated series	Concept pitched to USA Network and developed for a 1995 airdate, before being scrapped and was pitched to MTV, in co-produced with MTV Animation, for a 1999 airdate, which had also turned down.
Nutty the Friendly Dump	1997	John Kricfalusi	Animated series	Concept pitched to Comedy Central and developed for a Fall 1997 airdate, but was turned down.
Green Monkeys	1999	Betty Paraskevas; Michael Paraskevas	Animated series	Co-produced with Disney Television Animation
Harveytoons online animated shorts	1999	John Kricfalusi	Animated shorts	Series of online shorts commissioned for the official Harvey Entertainment website. Spooky the Tuff Little Ghost, Little Audrey, Little Dot and Herman and Katnip would make appearances.
The Heart Aches	1999	John Kricfalusi	Animated series	Pilot sold to Fox Family, following the adventures surrounding a girl band. It was slated to air for a September 2000 airdate alongside The Ripping Friends on Fox Kids, but was immediately cancelled with the network focusing on The Ripping Friends instead, which was delayed twice from May 2001 to eventually September 2001.
Flintstones animated shorts	2001	John Kricfalusi	Animated shorts	Co-produced with Cartoon Network Studios
