= The Jetsons =

American animated sitcom

- Genre: Animated sitcom; Comic science fiction
- Created by: William Hanna; Joseph Barbera
- Directed by: William Hanna (1962–63); Joseph Barbera (1962–63); Arthur Davis (1985–87); Oscar Dufau (1985–87); Carl Urbano (1985); Rudy Zamora (1985); Alan Zaslove (1985); Paul Sommer (1987); Charlie Downs (1987)
- Voices of: George O'Hanlon; Penny Singleton; Janet Waldo; Daws Butler; Mel Blanc; Don Messick; Jean Vander Pyl; Frank Welker (80s revival)
- Theme music composer: Hoyt Curtin
- Composer: Hoyt Curtin
- Country of origin: United States
- Original language: English
- No. of seasons: 3
- No. of episodes: 75 (list of episodes)

Production
- Executive producers: William Hanna (1985–87); Joseph Barbera (1985–87)
- Producers: William Hanna (1962–63); Joseph Barbera (1962–63); Bob Hathcock (1985); Berny Wolf (1987); Jeff Hall (1987)
- Running time: 22–30 minutes
- Production company: Hanna-Barbera Productions

Original release
- Network: ABC
- Release: September 23, 1962 – March 17, 1963
- Network: Syndication
- Release: September 16, 1985 – November 12, 1987

The Jetsons is an American animated sitcom produced by Hanna-Barbera Productions. It originally aired in prime time from September 23, 1962, to March 17, 1963, on ABC, then later aired in reruns via syndication, with new episodes produced from 1985 to 1987. It was Hanna-Barbera's Space Age counterpart to The Flintstones.

While the Flintstones lived in a world which was a comical version of the Stone Age, with machines powered by birds and other dinosaurs, the Jetsons live in a comical version of the space age, with elaborate robotic contraptions, aliens, holograms, and whimsical inventions.

The original had 24 episodes and aired on Sunday nights on ABC beginning on September 23, 1962, with prime time reruns continuing through September 22, 1963. It debuted as the first program broadcast in color on ABC, back in the early 1960s when only a handful of ABC stations were capable of broadcasting in color. In contrast, The Flintstones, while always produced in color, was broadcast in black-and-white for its first two seasons.

The show was originally scheduled opposite Walt Disney's Wonderful World of Color and Dennis the Menace and did not receive much attention. Due to poor ratings, it was canceled after its first season but was then moved to Saturday mornings, where it went on to be very successful. Following its primetime run, the show aired on Saturday mornings for decades, starting on ABC for the 1963–64 season and then on CBS and NBC. New episodes were produced for syndication from 1985 to 1987. No further specials or episodes of the show were produced after 1989, as the majority of the core cast (George O'Hanlon, Mel Blanc, and Daws Butler) had died in 1988 and 1989. The 1990 film Jetsons: The Movie served as the series finale to the television show, though it failed to achieve critical and commercial success.

== Premise ==
In the space age, the Jetsons are a family residing in Orbit City. The city's architecture is rendered in the Googie style and all homes and businesses are raised high above the ground on adjustable columns to avoid the pollutions from below. George Jetson lives with his family in the Skypad Apartments: his wife Jane is a homemaker, their teenage daughter Judy attends Orbit High School, and their son Elroy attends Little Dipper School. Housekeeping is performed by a robot maid named Rosie, who handles chores not otherwise rendered trivial by the home's numerous push-button Space Age-envisioned conveniences. The family has a dog named Astro that talks with an initial consonant mutation in which every word begins with an "R", as if speaking with a growl; a similar effect would also be used for Scooby-Doo.

George Jetson's work week consists of an hour a day, two days a week. His boss is Cosmo Spacely, the bombastic owner of Spacely Space Sprockets. Spacely has a competitor, Mr. Cogswell, owner of the rival company Cogswell Cogs (sometimes known as Cogswell's Cosmic Cogs). Jetson commutes to work in an aerocar with a transparent bubble top. Daily life is leisurely, assisted by numerous labor-saving devices, which occasionally break down with humorous results. Despite this, everyone complains of exhausting hard labor and difficulties living with the remaining inconveniences.

== Voice cast ==
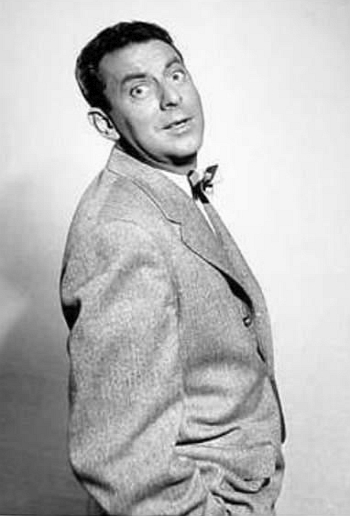
George O'Hanlon provided the voice of George Jetson.

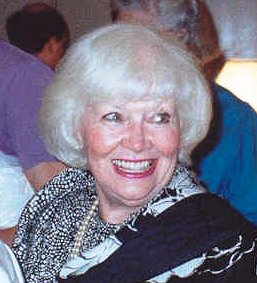
Penny Singleton was the voice of Jane Jetson.

- George O'Hanlon – George Jetson, Drummer (in "A Date with Jet Screamer"), Alice's Husband (in "The Space Car"), Police Radio (in "The Space Car"), Cat Burglar (in "The Coming of Astro"), Russian Newscaster (in "Test Pilot"), Soapy Sam (in "TV or Not TV")
- Penny Singleton – Jane Jetson, Alice (in "The Space Car"), Zoom Broom (in "Elroy in Wonderland")
- Daws Butler – Elroy Jetson, Henry Orbit, W.C Cogswell, Traffic Cop (in "A Date with Jet Screamer"), Knuckles Nuclear (in "The Space Car", Jane's Driving Lessons"), J.B. (in "The Space Car"), Bank Teller (in "The Space Car"), Molecular Motors Video Announcer (in "The Space Car"), Bank Security Guard #2 (in "The Space Car"), Moonstone (in "The Space Suit", "Astro's Top Secret"), Professor Lunar (in "Test Pilot"), Mr. Withers (in "Millionaire Astro"), Judge (in "Millionaire Astro"), Chef (in "G.I. Jetson"), Sergeant Moon (in "TV or Not TV"), Nimbly (in "TV or Not TV"), Little Boy (in "Elroy Meets Orbitty")
- Janet Waldo – Judy Jetson, Celeste Skyler (in "A Visit from Grandpa"), Miss Brainmocker (in "Elroy's Mob," "Elroy Meets Orbitty", "Far-Out Father"), Pliers Robot (in "Elroy in Wonderland"), Robot Cashier (in "Rip-Off Rosie"), Miss Booster (in "Boy George")
- Don Messick – Astro the Space Mutt, RUDI, Pet Shop Employee (in "The Coming of Astro"), Police Officer (in "The Coming of Astro", "Rosey's Boyfriend", "A Visit from Grandpa", "Rip-Off Rosie"), Mac (in "Rosey's Boyfriend", "Rosie Come Home", "Wedding Bells for Rosey"), Mr. Transitor (in "Elroy's TV Show"), Uniblab (in "Uniblab", "G.I. Jetson", "Little Bundle of Trouble"), Dr. Radius (in "Test Pilot"), Delivery Boy (in "G.I. Jetson"), Narrator (in "Millionaire Astro", "Space Bong"), Jury-Vac (in "Millionaire Astro"), Delivery Boy (in "G.I. Jetson"), Colonel Countdown (in "G.I. Jetson"), Dr. McGravity (in "Dude Ranch"), Kenny Countdown (in "Elroy's Mob"), Police Officer #1 (in "Elroy's Mob"), Orville (in "Elroy Meets Orbitty"), Announcer (in "Elroy Meets Orbitty", "Rosey Come Home"), William Martin (in "Fugitive Fleas"), Professor Ozone (in "S'No Relative"), Robot Repairer (in "Dance Time"), Moonstone (in "Mirrormorph"), Newscaster (in "The Cosmic Courtship of George and Jane"), Saturn Trash Stasher (in "Elroy in Wonderland"), Roboto (in "Rip-Off Rosie"), Wolf (in "Haunted Halloween"), Edgar (in "Haunted Halloween"), Robot Usher (in "Haunted Halloween"), Starbite (in "Astro's Big Moment"), IRS Agent #1 (in "Future Tense"), Ghost of Christmas Past (in "A Jetson Christmas Carol")
- Jean Vander Pyl – Rosey, Mrs. Spacely, Jane's Mother (in "Rosey the Robot", "Mirrormorph", "Little Bundle of Trouble"), Agnes (in "Rosey the Robot"), Blanche Cog (in "Rosey the Robot"), Miss Galaxy (in "The Flying Suit", "SuperGeorge", "One Strike, You're Out"), Gloria (in "The Space Car", "Miss Solar System"), Knuckles Nuclear's Moll (in "The Space Car"), Alice's Mother (in "The Space Car"), Emily Scope (in "A Visit from Grandpa"), GiGi Galaxy (in "Las Venus"), Ariel (in "Jane's Driving Lesson"), Doctor's Assistant (in "Rip-Off Rosie"), Female Nurse (in "Rip-Off Rosie")
- Mel Blanc – Cosmo Spacely, Jimmy (in "Rosey the Robot"), Moon Garbageman (in "Good Little Scouts"), Herbie (in "The Flying Suit"), Little Green Bird (in "The Flying Suit"), Homeless Man (in "The Flying Suit"), French Newscaster (in "Test Pilot"), Commander McMissile (in "G.I. Jetson"), Gridfather (in "Crime Games")
- Frank Welker – Orbitty, Felix (in "Elroy Meets Orbitty"), Elroy Jetson Look-alike (in "Rosey Come Home"), Richard Rocketeer (in "Family Fallout"), Hunky Moonrock (in "S'No Relative"), TV Reporter (in "S'No Relative"), Parking Meter (in "Dance Time"), Time Clock (in "Judy Takes Off"), Professor Proteus (in "Mirrormorph"), Francoise (in "The Cosmic Courtship of George and Jane"), Robot Dog (in "Elroy in Wonderland"), Nozzle (in "Elroy in Wonderland"), Space Bong (in "Space Bong"), Remote Control Cat (in "Astro's Big Moment"), IRS Agent #2 (in "Future Tense"), Jezebel (in "Far-Out Father"), Toy Robot Cat (in "The Jetson Christmas Carol"), Young Cosmo Spacely (in "The Jetson Christmas Carol")

In later productions, Jeff Bergman has voiced George, Elroy, and Mr. Spacely. Bergman completed voice work as George and Spacely for Jetsons: The Movie (1990) after George O'Hanlon and Mel Blanc died during production. Controversially, Janet Waldo was replaced—after recording all of her dialogue—by then-popular singer Tiffany for Jetsons: The Movie. Lauri Fraser has provided the voice of Jane Jetson in television commercials for Radio Shack.

== Production ==
The first season for the series was produced and directed by William Hanna and Joseph Barbera. When Warner Bros. Cartoons closed in May 1961, several of its animators, including Gerry Chiniquy and Ken Harris, joined Hanna-Barbera to work on the first season.

== Morey Amsterdam and Pat Carroll controversy ==
In 1963, Morey Amsterdam and Pat Carroll each filed $12,000 suits against Hanna-Barbera for breach of contract, claiming they had been cast as George and Jane Jetson, respectively. Although their contracts stipulated they would be paid US$500 an episode with a guarantee of twenty-four episodes (i.e., a full season) of work, they recorded only one episode before being replaced. Several sources claimed the change had occurred as a result of sponsor conflict between Amsterdam's commitment to The Dick Van Dyke Show and Carroll's to Make Room for Daddy. The case had been closed by early 1965. In a 2013 interview, Pat Carroll indicated that the court had ruled in favor of Hanna-Barbera.

== Episodes ==
Season	Episodes	Originally released		
Season	Episodes	First released	Last released	Network
1	24	September 23, 1962	March 3, 1963	ABC
2	41	September 16, 1985	December 13, 1985	Syndication
3	10	October 19, 1987	November 12, 1987	Syndication

The Jetsons originally aired in primetime on ABC. It was a commercial failure in its first season and was negatively reviewed, according to Bob Hathcock. Reruns were aired on CBS in 1963, and NBC from 1964 to 1967. It was brought back to NBC's schedule in 1971, continually airing the same episodes through 1983.

In 1984, Hanna-Barbera began producing new episodes specifically for syndication; by September 1985, the 24 episodes from the first season were combined with 41 new episodes and began airing in morning or late afternoon time slots in 80 U.S. media markets, including the 30 largest. The 41 new episodes were produced at a cost of $300,000 each, and featured all of the voice actors from the 1962–1963 show. During 1987, 10 additional "season 3" episodes were also made available for syndication.

=== Broadcast history ===
Following its prime time cancellation, ABC placed reruns of The Jetsons on its Saturday morning schedule for the 1963–1964 season. The program would spend the next two decades on Saturday mornings, with subsequent runs on CBS (1964–65 and 1969–71) and NBC (1965–67; 1971–76; 1979–81 and 1982–83). The Jetsons began airing in syndication in September 1976, and these runs continued after the program returned to NBC's Saturday morning schedule. Along with fellow Hanna-Barbera production Jonny Quest and Warner Bros.' Looney Tunes shorts, The Jetsons is one of the few series to have aired on each of the Big Three television networks in the United States.

The Jetsons were also aired on MeTV

== Theme song ==
The series' theme song, by composer Hoyt Curtin, became a pop hit in 1986.

== Science fiction themes ==
Animation historian Christopher P. Lehman considers that the series shares its main science fiction theme with Funderful Suburbia (1962), a Modern Madcaps animated short. Both feature people involved in space colonization. However, there is a key difference in the nature of the colonization: in Funderful Suburbia, humans colonize outer space in order to escape the problems of planet Earth, while the Jetsons live in a place where space colonization is already established. Life in outer space is depicted as a fact of life, and the reasons behind humanity's takeover of outer space are never explained.

Lehman argues that the series offers no explanation for its science fiction premise and does not directly satirize the social problems of any era. The setting is combined with standard sitcom elements, which serve as the series' main focus.

Smithsonian's Matt Novak, in an article called "Why The Show Still Matters" asserts, "Today The Jetsons stands as the single most important piece of 20th century futurism."

Novak continues, "It's easy for some people to dismiss The Jetsons as just a TV show, and a lowly cartoon at that. But this little show—for better and for worse—has had a profound impact on the way that Americans think and talk about the future."

== Reception ==
After the announcement of the fall 1962 network television schedule Time magazine characterized The Jetsons as one of several new situation comedies (along with The Beverly Hillbillies, I'm Dickens... He's Fenster, and Our Man Higgins) that was "stretching further than ever for their situations"; after all the season's new shows had premiered—a season "responding to Minow's exhortations"—the magazine called the series "silly and unpretentious, corny and clever, now and then quite funny." Almost all of the new sitcoms disappeared at the end of the season; only The Beverly Hillbillies would be renewed for new episodes in 1963–64, while The Jetsons would continue in Saturday morning reruns, eventually leading to its 1980s revival.

Thirty years later, Time wrote: "In an age of working mothers, single parents and gay matrimony (same-sex marriage), George Jetson and his clan already seem quaint even to the baby boomers who grew up with them." In contrast, economist Jeffrey A. Tucker wrote in 2011 that The Jetsons is "distinguished in science-fiction lore by the fact that it is a rare attempt in this genre that actually succeeds in predicting the future." Apart from flying cars, which are as yet unfeasible in the real world ("a lot of fun, until that first accident occurs"), much of the technology of The Jetsons has become commonplace: people now communicate via video chat on flat screens; domestic robots such as the Roomba are widespread, and various high-tech devices are used for leisure. Tucker notes that The Jetsons depicts neither a grim dystopia nor an idyllic utopia, but rather a world where capitalism and entrepreneurship still exist and technology has not changed fundamental elements of human nature.

In 2017, Devon Maloney from The Verge described the show as a "bone-chilling dystopia", stating how a reboot-comic book revealed that an environmental apocalypse caused humans to seek refuge in aerial cities. Maloney also notes the lack of people of color in the show and theorizes how discrimination against impoverished groups and developing countries could've taken place, stating "though long held up as the quintessential utopia, The Jetsons is a perfect dystopia, built on the corpses of a billions-strong underclass deemed unworthy of a life in the clouds."

== Specials and film adaptations ==
Television films

- The Jetsons Meet the Flintstones (1987)
- Rockin' with Judy Jetson (1988)

Television specials

- Hanna-Barbera's 50th: A Yabba Dabba Doo Celebration (1989)

Theatrical releases

- Jetsons: The Movie (1990)

Direct-to-video films

- The Jetsons & WWE: Robo-WrestleMania! (2017)

== Proposed continuations and reboots ==
A 1974 proposal would have created a sequel series to The Jetsons, set roughly ten years after the original series. CBS rejected the proposal and it was retooled into Partridge Family 2200 A.D.

Paramount Pictures first tried to film a live-action version of The Jetsons in 1985, which was to be executive produced by Gary Nardino, but failed to do so. In the late 1980s, Universal Pictures purchased the film rights for The Flintstones and The Jetsons from Hanna-Barbera Productions. The result was Jetsons: The Movie, which was released in 1990. In November 2001, screenwriting duo Paul Foley and Dan Forman were brought onboard to revise a screenplay, with Rob Minkoff attached as director and Denise Di Novi as producer.

On March 18, 2003, it was announced that the script was again being reworked, with Adam Shankman entering negotiations to direct and co-write the film. In June 2004, with Shankman still onboard as director, Di Novi confirmed that the latest draft was penned by Sam Harper. By May 2006, the project was re-launched with Adam F. Goldberg confirmed as the new screenwriter, and Donald De Line was added as producer alongside Di Novi.

In May 2007, director Robert Rodriguez entered talks with Universal and Warner Bros. Pictures to film a CGI adaptation of The Jetsons for a potential 2009 theatrical release, having at the time discussed directing a film adaptation of Land of the Lost with Universal. Rodriguez was uncertain which project he would pursue next, though the latest script draft for The Jetsons by Goldberg was further along in development.

In January 2012, recording artist Kanye West was mistakenly reported as creative director over the project, though West clarified on social media that "I was just discussing becoming the creative director for the Jetson [sic] movie and someone on the call yelled out... you should do a Jetsons tour!" Longtime producer Denise Di Novi denied the confirmed involvement stating negotiations with West via conference call was merely "preliminary and exploratory and introductory". In February 2012, Warner Bros. hired Van Robichaux and Evan Susser to rewrite the script.

On January 23, 2015, it was announced that Warner Bros. is planning a new animated Jetsons feature film, with Matt Lieberman to provide the screenplay. On May 25, 2017, it was announced that Conrad Vernon would direct the film.

On August 17, 2017, ABC ordered a pilot for a live-action sitcom version of The Jetsons to be written by Gary Janetti and executive produced by Janetti, Jack Rapke and Robert Zemeckis.

On October 15, 2025, it was reported that a live-action film based on The Jetsons was in development with Colin Trevorrow to write and direct and Jim Carrey in talks to star.

== Home media ==
In 1990, Hanna-Barbera Home Video released six episodes from the show on videocassette. Warner Home Video released season 1 on DVD in Region 1 on May 11, 2004; upon its release, James Poniewozik wrote that it is "as much about New Frontier 1962 as about the distant future. Its ditzy slapstick is like the peanut-butter-and-jelly mix Goober Grape—if you didn't love it as a kid, you're not going to acquire the taste as an adult—and the pop-culture gags ... have not aged well. But the animation is still a classic of gee-whiz atomic-age modernism."

The review of the DVD release from Entertainment Weekly said the show "trots through surprisingly dated sitcom plots about blustery bosses, bad lady drivers, and Elvis Presleyesque teen idols, all greeted with laugh tracks" but points out "it's the appeal of the retro-prescient gadgets (recliner massagers, big-screen TVs, two-way monitors) that still carries the show." Season 1 was released on DVD in Region 4 on July 5, 2006. Season Two, Volume 1 was released on DVD almost three years later, on June 2, 2009, for Region 1.

On November 8, 2011, Warner Home Video (via the Warner Archive Collection) released The Jetsons: Season 2, Volume 2 on DVD in Region 1 as part of their Hanna-Barbera Classic Collection. This is a Manufacture-on-Demand (MOD) release, available exclusively through Warner's online store and Amazon.com. Warner Archive followed up by releasing Season 3 in the same way on May 13, 2014.

The complete ABC series was released on Blu-ray on September 10, 2019, by Warner Home Video (again via the Warner Archive Collection), sourced from new 2K scans of the original broadcast masters while maintaining the show's original 4:3 aspect ratio.

DVD name	Ep #	Release date
Season 1	24	May 11, 2004
Season 2, Volume 1	21	June 2, 2009
Season 2, Volume 2	20	November 8, 2011
Season 3	10	May 13, 2014

== Legacy ==
William S Higgins writing for The Encyclopedia of Science Fiction noted that the show "has become a popular metonym for 'the future'. While satirizing Space Age notions of a better tomorrow, the series seems also to have visually codified expectations of the future to a great many viewers: when the twenty-first century arrived, complaints that flying cars and jet packs were missing often mentioned The Jetsons."

The show influenced the turn-of-the-millennium show Futurama, which made a number of references to The Jetsons, or reused its tropes.

Boomerang has aired reruns of the show since April 1, 2000. Cartoon Network aired the show from 1992 to 2004 and returned the series October 2012. Also, some of the 1980s episodes were available for viewing on In2TV prior to its shutdown; these episodes were later moved to the online version of Kids' WB. Also the first two seasons of The Jetsons are available to download on Sony's PlayStation Network, Apple's iTunes Store and at the Xbox Live Marketplace. The Kids' WB website eventually shut down in 2015; however, the Kids' WB episodes can still be streamed, thanks to much of the website being preserved by the Internet Archive's Wayback Machine.

Forbes magazine valued Spacely Sprockets at $1.3 billion, on its "The 25 Largest Fictional Companies" list.

The original cartoon series had several devices that did not exist at the time but subsequently have not only been invented but are in common usage: a flatscreen television, newspaper on a computer-like screen, a computer virus, video chat, a tanning bed, home treadmill and more.

In January 2009, IGN listed The Jetsons as the 46th best animated television series.

== See also ==
- List of works produced by Hanna-Barbera Productions
- List of Hanna-Barbera characters
- Design for Dreaming
- Googie architecture
