= Jetsons: The Movie =

1990 film directed by William Hanna and Joseph Barbera

- Theatrical release poster
- Directed by: William Hanna; Joseph Barbera
- Written by: Dennis Marks
- Based on: The Jetsons by: William Hanna; Joseph Barbera
- Produced by: William Hanna; Joseph Barbera
- Starring: George O'Hanlon; Patric Zimmerman; Tiffany; Penny Singleton; Jean Vanderpyl; Don Messick; Mel Blanc
- Edited by: Karen Doulac; Gil Iverson; Tim Iverson; Greg Watson
- Music by: John Debney
- Production company: Hanna-Barbera Productions
- Distributed by: Universal Pictures
- Release date: July 6, 1990
- Running time: 82 minutes
- Country: United States
- Language: English
- Budget: $8 million
- Box office: $20.3 million

Jetsons: The Movie is a 1990 American animated science fiction comedy film produced and directed by William Hanna and Joseph Barbera and written by Dennis Marks, based on the animated television series The Jetsons by Hanna-Barbera. It stars the voices of George O'Hanlon and Mel Blanc, as well as Tiffany in her feature film debut as Judy Jetson and Brad Garrett in his animated film debut. Penny Singleton and Don Messick also reprised their roles in the film. The story follows George Jetson, who is tasked with running a new Spacely Sprockets facility by his boss Cosmo Spacely. However, after he brings his family along to support him, they uncover the tragic truth of the facility's location.

The film was released on July 6, 1990. The film received mixed reviews from critics. Although it grossed $20.3 million on a budget of $8 million during its theatrical run, it was considered a box office failure due to its $12 million marketing campaign. The film would later become a moderate commercial success on home video. O'Hanlon and Blanc died during production of the film, which was dedicated to both their memories. Jetsons: The Movie was the last theatrical film to be directed by William Hanna and Joseph Barbera before their deaths in 2001 and 2006 respectively. It serves as the series finale to the television series which was cancelled three years prior to the film’s release, as no episodes were produced following the film's release. While the characters would make subsequent appearances in other media over the years, this film was also the final official Jetsons production until the direct to video release of The Jetsons & WWE: Robo-WrestleMania! in 2017.

Although Warner Bros. owns the rights to the majority of the Hanna-Barbera library, including most of The Jetsons media, the distribution rights to this film are still owned by Universal Pictures.

== Plot ==
In the late 21st century, Spacely Sprockets and Spindles has opened a new mining colony called the "Orbiting Ore Asteroid". The proposed project is meant to increase productivity at 1/10 the cost of manufacturing on Earth. However, the factory is mysteriously and continuously sabotaged. During a meeting, Spacely Sprockets' president Cosmo Spacely (Mel Blanc) learns from the robotic plant engineer Rudy-2 (Ronnie Schell) that the latest head of the factory has fled in fear, the fourth in a line of vice presidents that Spacely has lost so far. Fearing for his company (and profits), Spacely asks robot assistant Gertrude to give him the name of someone who is loyal, expendable, and can push a button: thus, George Jetson (George O'Hanlon) succeeds becomes the new Vice President.

Because of his new title, George and his family must move to the asteroid, which upsets the family as their normal lifestyle and upcoming plans are disrupted. As they acclimate to their new apartment community on the asteroid, George is shown around the plant by Rudy-2, Jane (Penny Singleton) and Rosie (Jean Vander Pyl) befriend Rudy-2's wife Lucy-2 (Patti Deutsch), and Elroy (Patric Zimmerman) joins the local basketball team, meeting Rudy-2's son Teddy-2 (Dana Hill) with whom he first is at odds, but eventually befriends. Meanwhile, Judy (Tiffany) is upset that she lost her date to rock star Cosmic Cosmo (Steve McClintock) to a friend of hers back at home, but comes to terms with it after meeting a teenage boy named Apollo Blue (Paul Kreppel).

George, after acclimating to his new job, decides that he is ready to start working, so Mr. Spacely can see the plant working at full-capacity and its machines are able to churn out the one millionth Spacely sprocket. However, the opening-day festivities give way to panic and danger as the factory is sabotaged once again. Over the next several days, George and Rudy-2 try to fix things, but the issues persist to the point that Mr. Spacely, fed up and thinking George is responsible, decides to charter a flight to the asteroid to check on things personally. George stays overnight in the factory to try to catch the saboteurs in the act, only to accidentally fall asleep and be taken away by the mysterious creatures.

At nighttime, Elroy, Teddy-2, and their neighbor Fergie Furbelow (Russi Taylor) sneak into the plant and meet Squeep (Frank Welker), a member of a small furry alien race known as Grungees (also Welker). Squeep, with Teddy-2 translating, reveals that the factory is actually drilling into and destroying his people's home, which resides inside the asteroid. Jane, Judy, Apollo, Rudy-2, and Astro show up and learn this as well, and George, after being found hog-tied in the Grungees' colony, is eventually convinced as well. Spacely arrives and sees his factory at a stand-still, and after disabling Rudy-2 following his attempts to stop him, Spacely angrily reactivates it, putting everyone inside the asteroid in jeopardy. Everyone safely escapes, and George finally stands up to Spacely and stops the factory, though mainly through his own unwitting sabotage. After exposing the catastrophe his boss blatantly created for profit, George and Spacely come up with a plan to have the Grungees run the factory and manufacture the sprockets for him, thus preventing their home from being destroyed.

Soon after, the plant is back up and running under the Grungees' control and Spacely Sprockets finally reaches its millionth sprocket. Now that the Grungees are running the factory, Spacely decides to send George back to Earth, retaining his Vice President title (but with no raise). Thus, George and his family return to their old home, saying goodbye to their new friends. Fergie attempts to stowaway with the Jetsons, and Apollo and the 2 and Furbelow families tell them that they'll meet again, whether on Earth or in Space. As the family passes over the factory on their way home, the Grungees arrange themselves to form the words "THANKS GEORGE", as a friendly goodbye to him for saving their home.

== Voice cast ==
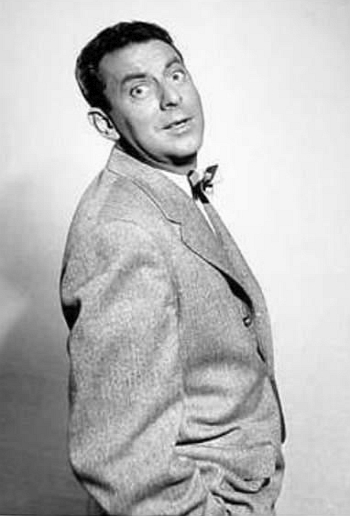
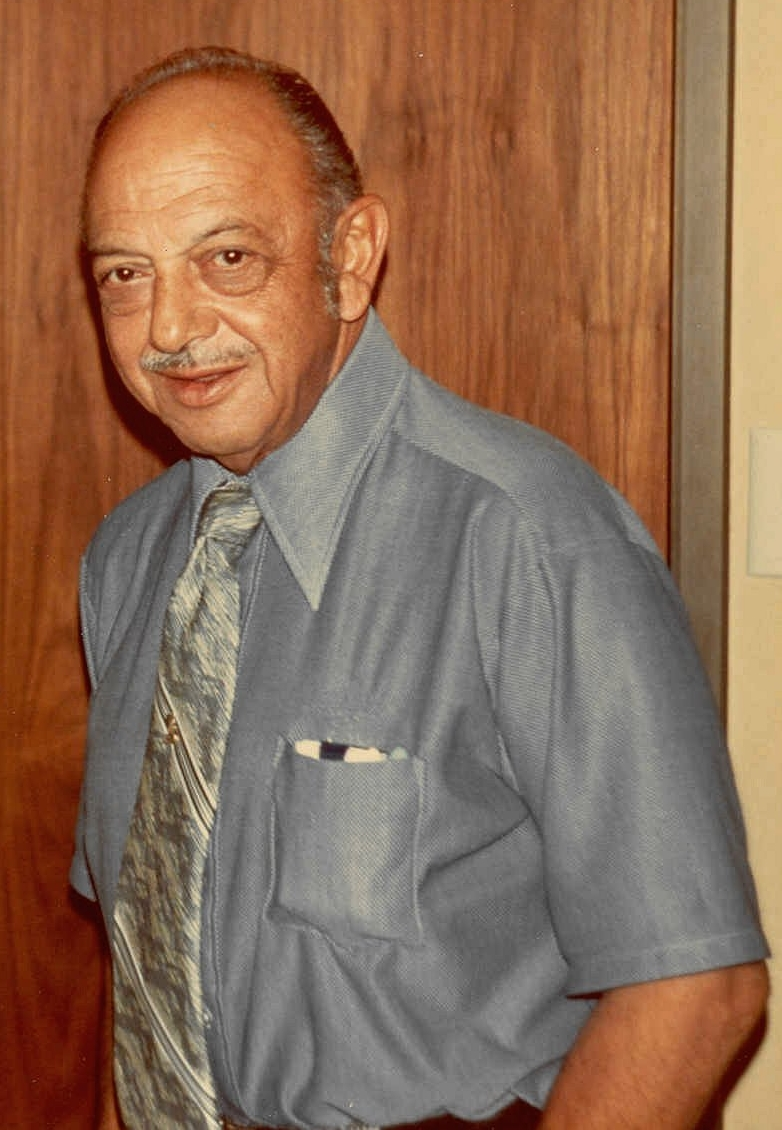
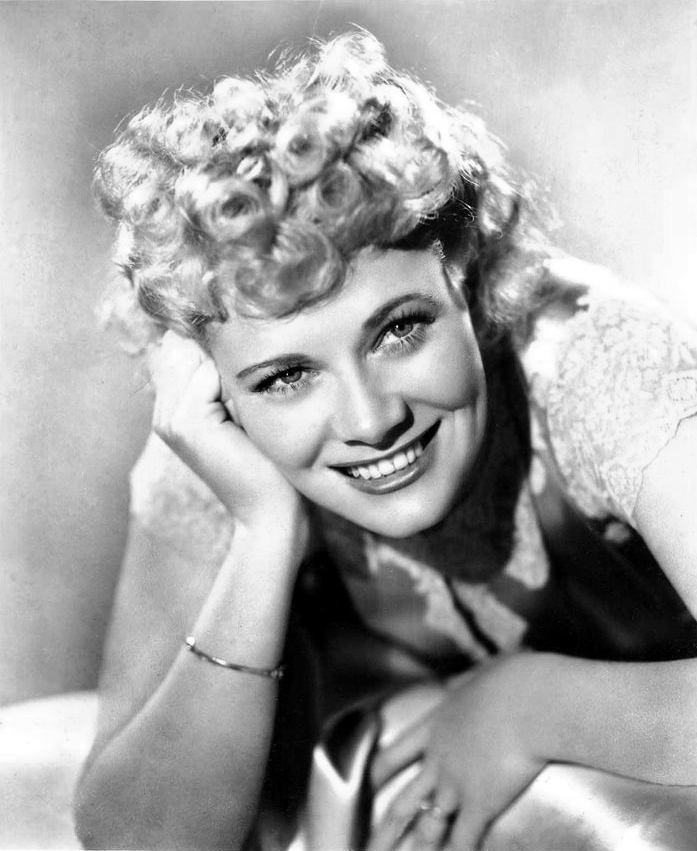
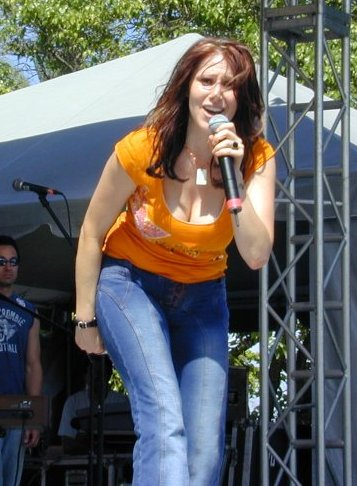
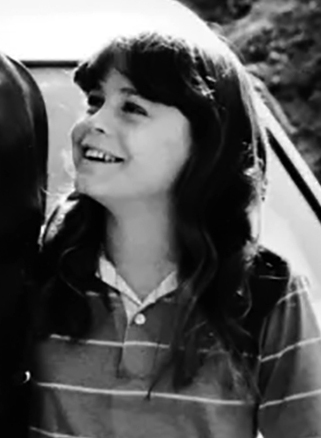
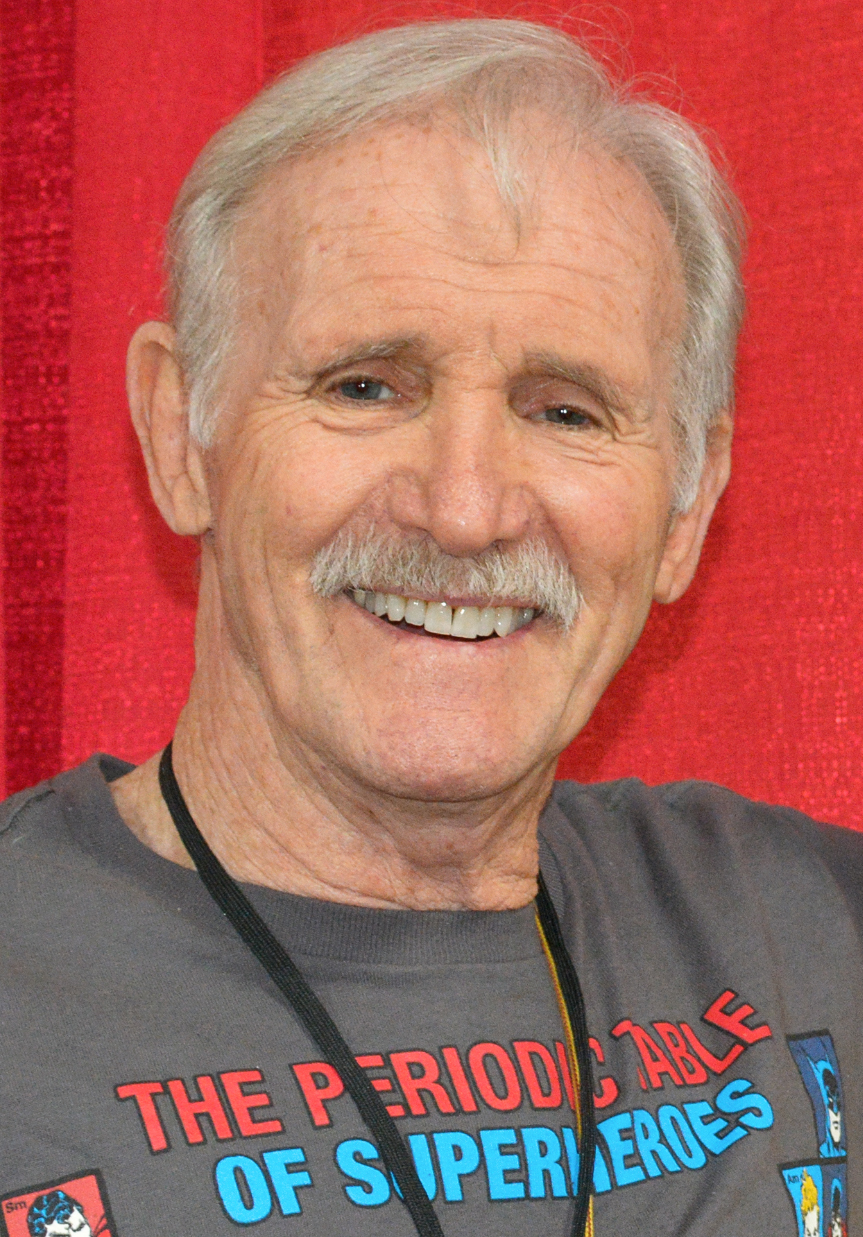
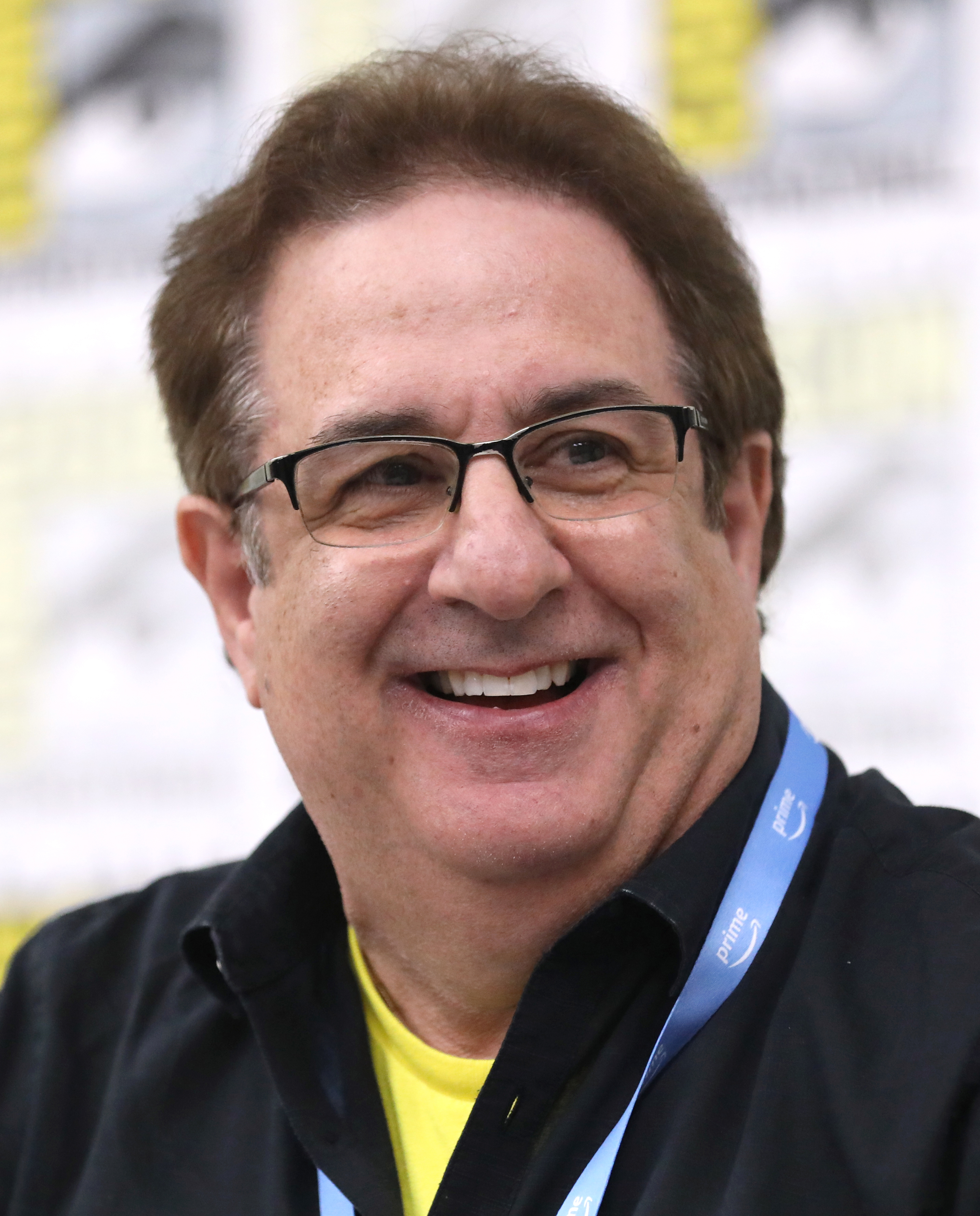
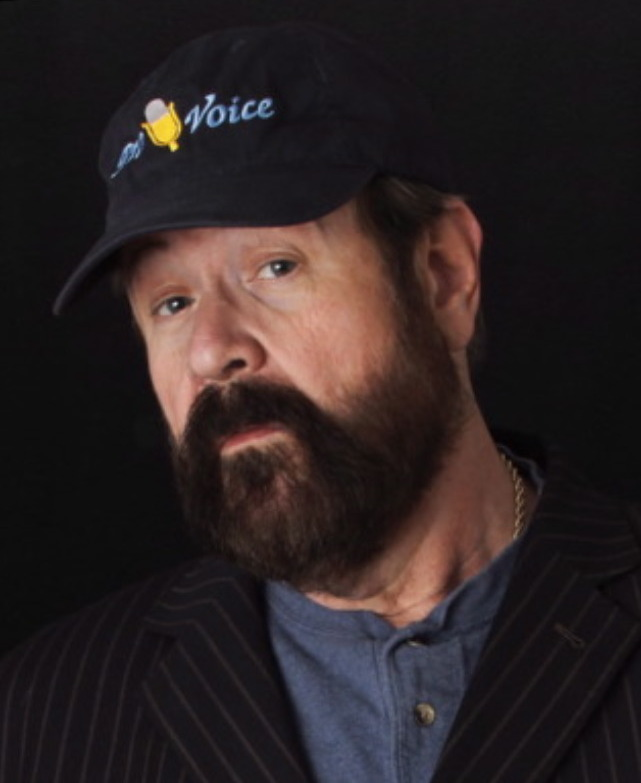
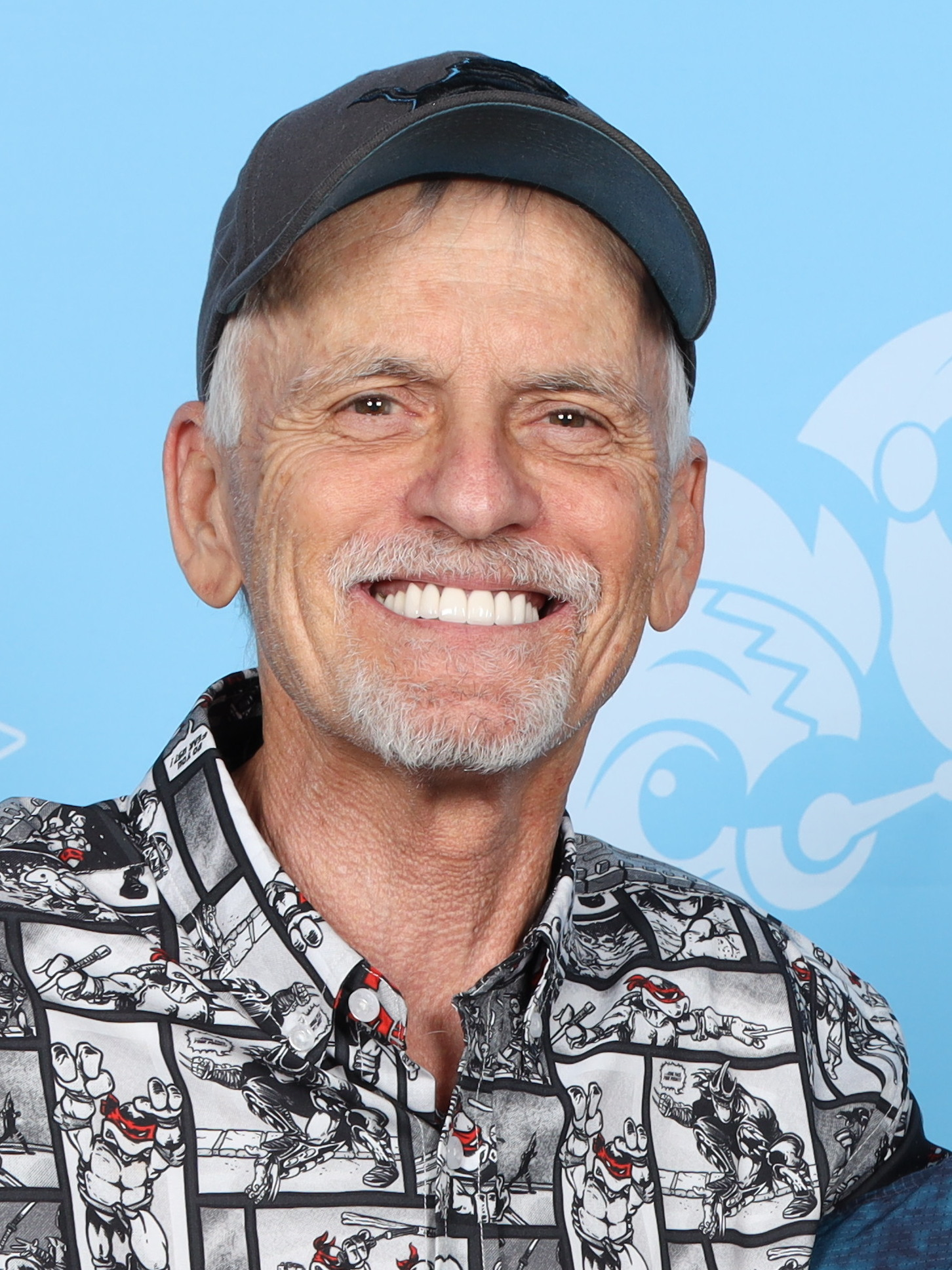
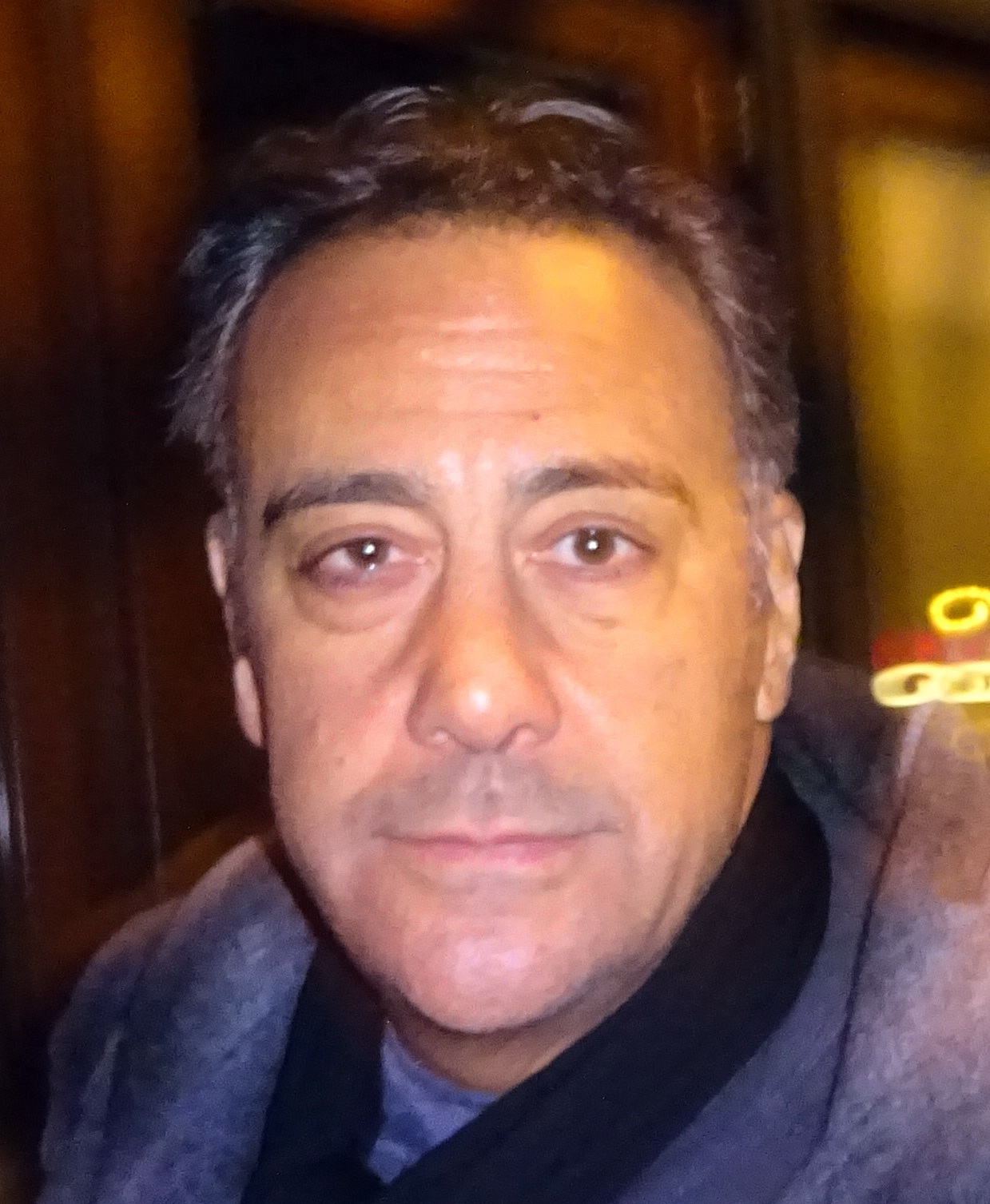
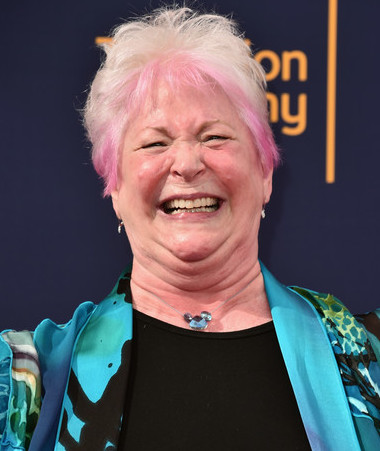
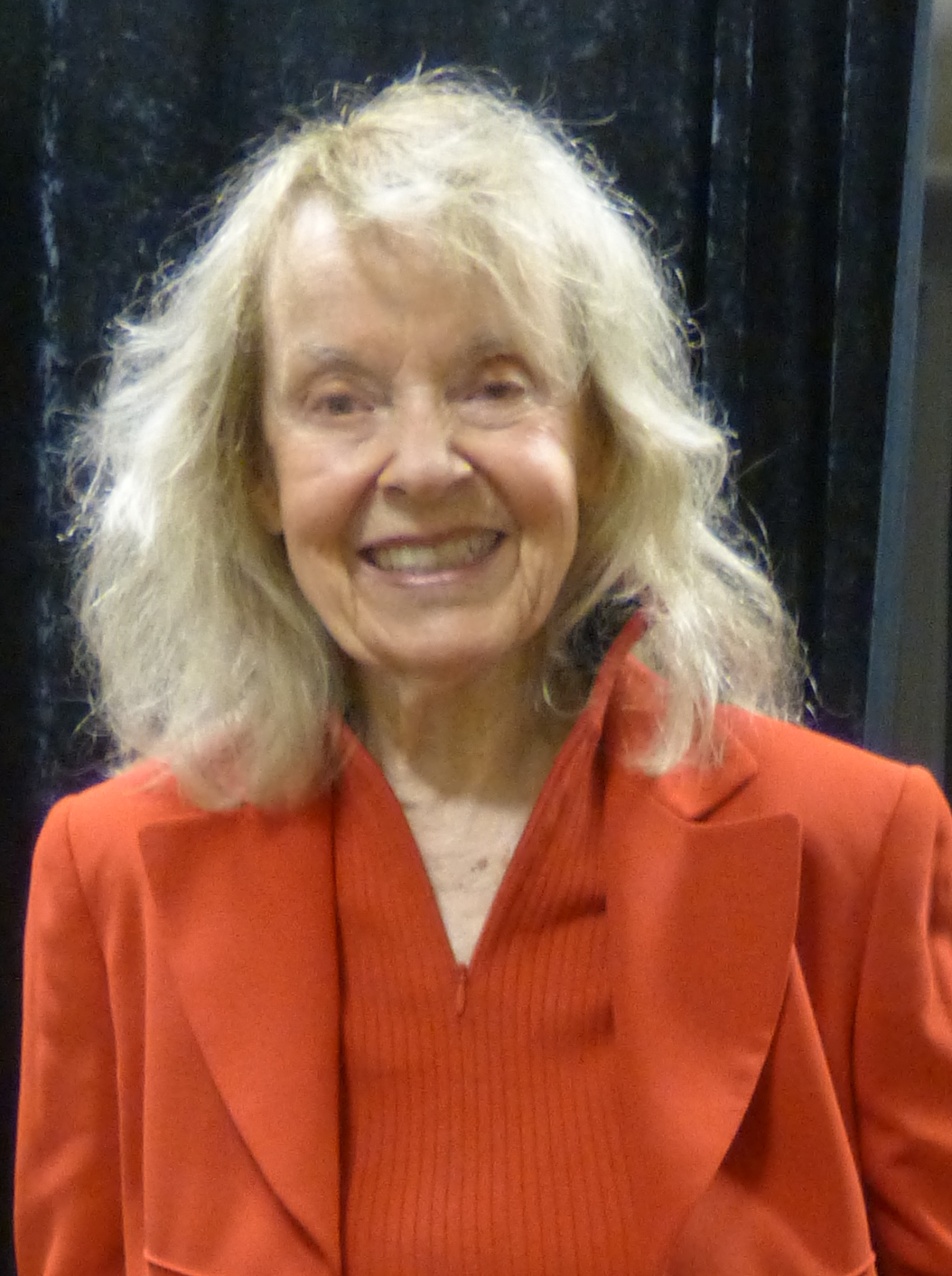
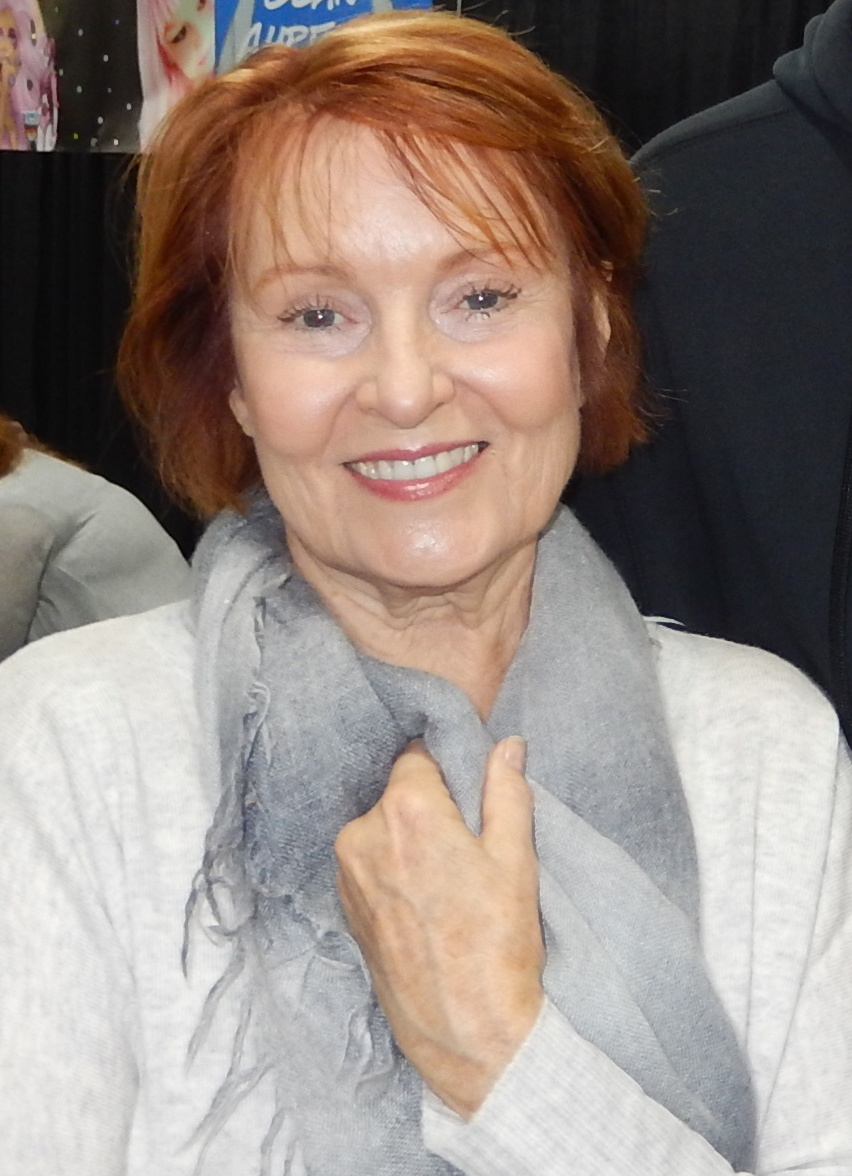
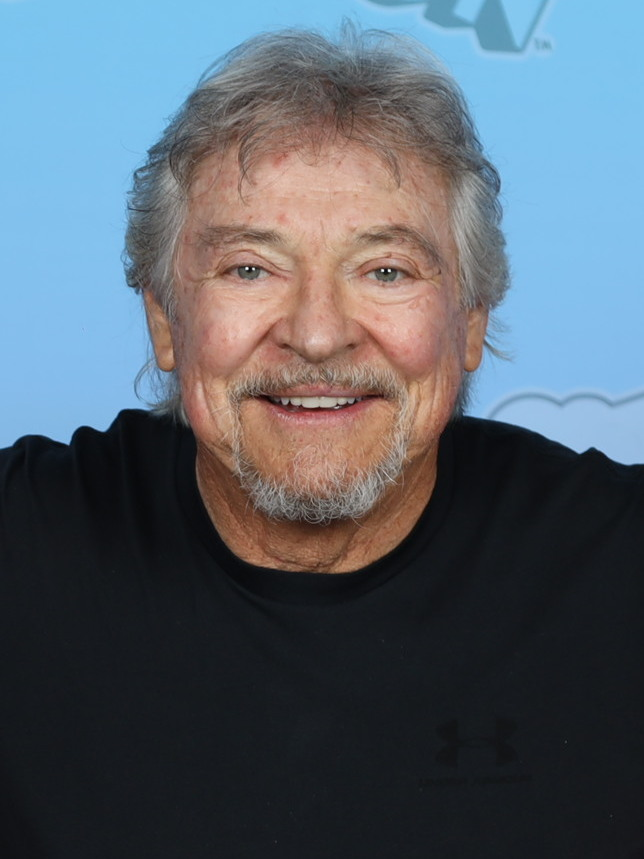
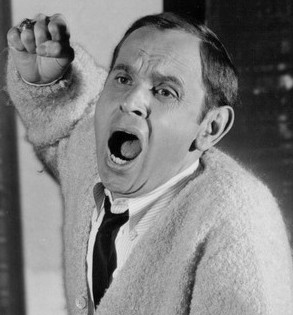
George O'Hanlon (in 1958), Mel Blanc (in 1976), Penny Singleton (in 1938), Tiffany Darwish (in 2003), Dana Hill (in 1982), Michael Bell (in 2015), Jeff Bergman (in 2023), Brian Cummings (in 2016), Rob Paulsen (in 2024), Brad Garrett (in 2018), Russi Taylor (in 2018), Janet Waldo (in 2013), B. J. Ward (in 2018), Jim Ward (in 2012), Frank Welker (in 2023) and Ronnie Schell (in 1967).
- George O'Hanlon as George Jetson
- Mel Blanc as Mr. Cosmo Spacely
- Penny Singleton as Jane Jetson
- Tiffany as Judy Jetson
- Patric Zimmerman as Elroy Jetson. Zimmerman replaced Elroy’s original voice actor Daws Butler after his death in 1988.
- Don Messick as Astro the Space Mutt
- Jean Vander Pyl as Rosie the Robot
- Ronnie Schell as Rudy-2
- Patti Deutsch as Lucy-2
- Dana Hill as Teddy-2
- Russi Taylor as Fergie Furbelow
- Paul Kreppel as Apollo Blue
- Rick Dees as Rocket Rick Ragnarok
- Steve McClintock as Cosmic Cosmo [uncredited]

=== Additional voices ===
The following were credited under this section in the end credits:

- Michael Bell as:
  - Basketball Coach
  - Board Member
- Jeff Bergman as Board Member
  - Bergman also does additional uncredited dialogue for George Jetson and Mr. Spacely after the deaths of O'Hanlon and Blanc, both of whom died during the production of this movie before they could finish recording their lines.
- Brian Cummings as "All My Asteroids" Announcer
- Brad Garrett as Bertie Furbelow
- Rob Paulsen as Board Member
- Susan Silo as Gertrude
- Janet Waldo as Robot Secretary
- B.J. Ward as Gertie Furbelow
- Jim Ward as Mac
- Frank Welker as:
  - Squeep
  - Grungees
  - Basketball Coach
  - Astro (in some scenes)

== Production ==
A Jetsons film started development when Paramount Pictures first tried to create a live-action version around 1985, which was to be executive produced by Gary Nardino. However, the project never got far into production, putting the film into a turnaround. Later on during the 1980s, Universal Pictures bought the film rights for The Jetsons from Hanna-Barbera Productions.

A problem that arose during the production of the film was the advanced age and poor health of several of the voice actors from the series, with Don Messick being the youngest at age 62. Daws Butler, the voice of Elroy, fell ill with a stroke and pneumonia in early 1988 and died on May 18, before he could record any lines for the film. Though Butler had been training Joe Bevilacqua and Greg Burson to succeed him, voice coordinator Kris Zimmerman brought in her then-husband Patric, then a relative unknown, to fill the role of Elroy. George O'Hanlon, who had already been ill throughout the 1980s revival, died of a stroke on February 11, 1989, after he finished recording his dialogue; voice director Andrea Romano later recalled that he could record for only an hour at a time and had his final stroke while at the studio. Mel Blanc also died during the production of the film on July 10, 1989. Voice actor Jeff Bergman would later step in and fill in for both O'Hanlon and Blanc as George Jetson and Mr. Spacely to complete their dialogue in additional scenes of the film.

Janet Waldo, the original voice of Judy Jetson, recorded the role for the film, but she was replaced by singer Tiffany, as studio executives hoped that Tiffany's involvement would result in a stronger box office performance. Waldo still provided the voice of a robot secretary and some of Judy's lines by Waldo remain in the film. Displeased with the casting change, Romano attempted to have her own name removed from the finished film. Tiffany said her singing voice was what initially drew the attention of Barbera. Tiffany sang three songs used in the film ("I Always Thought I'd See You Again", "You and Me" and "Home"), which are on the soundtrack album along with "Jetsons' Rap" by XXL and tracks by other artists. Tiffany did not write any of the songs, but she cited "I Always Thought I'd See You Again" as one of her favorites to sing.

== Release ==
Jetsons: The Movie was originally slated for a December 1989 release, but it was delayed to avoid competition with Disney's The Little Mermaid, Don Bluth's All Dogs Go to Heaven (which were released on the same day), Universal's own Back to the Future Part II and Warner Bros.' National Lampoon's Christmas Vacation. Universal released The Wizard in its place.

=== Marketing ===
A behind-the-scenes featurette of the movie was showcased during the broadcast special Hanna-Barbera's 50th: A Yabba Dabba Doo Celebration that aired on TNT on July 17, 1989. The segment includes work in progress pencil tests, set designs of the environments and a recording session of the song "I Always Thought I'd See You Again" performed by Tiffany, the voice of Judy Jetson in the film.

During the summer of the film's release, Kool-Aid had a tie-in promotion in which Kool-Aid points could be redeemed for a red Jetsons toy car featuring the cast. However, the promotion was not carried by some theaters, and instead of a red Jetsons car, the points were redeemed for a miniature film poster. Wendy's restaurants had a Jetsons kids' meal tie-in. When clips were shown on television, scenes with George had re-dubbed lines from an unnamed voice actor. The commercials showed Wendy's founder Dave Thomas either in a theater watching the movie or at his restaurant promoting the film.

A tie-in simulator ride named The Funtastic World of Hanna-Barbera opened at Universal Studios Florida one month before the film's release. In the attraction, William Hanna and Joseph Barbera state that the Jetsons will star in their next project (presuming the film), which angers Dick Dastardly and Muttley and leads them to kidnap Elroy. Yogi Bear and Boo-Boo Bear must save Elroy by riding through the worlds of The Flintstones, Scooby-Doo, Where Are You!, and The Jetsons. Merchandise based on the film and other Hanna-Barbera-related stuff was sold at the ride's gift shop. Also in 1990, Ralston released an apple and cinnamon–flavored Jetsons cereal.

=== Home media ===
The film was first released on home video on VHS, Betamax, and LaserDisc on October 25, 1990, presented in an open matte full screen format. It proved successful in the home video market, and finished in the top 40 best-selling videos of 1991 in the United States. On April 28, 2009, it received it received a region 1 DVD release in its original theatrical widescreen format. DVD releases for Europe occurred in 2007 and in Australia in the early 2000s. It is also available via digital download on demand on platforms such as the iTunes Store. Blu-ray releases occurred in Region B on June 6, 2016, and in Region A on February 16, 2021, by Kino Lorber (under license from Universal). This release included a commentary track by author and film historian Lee Gambin, an audio interview with Jeff Bergman, the isolated audio track of John Debney's score in 5.1 DTS-HD and in lossless stereo, and the film's theatrical trailer.

== Reception ==
=== Box office ===
The film opened at fourth place, behind Die Hard 2, Days of Thunder and Dick Tracy, with a weekend gross of $5 million from 1,562 theaters. The film then lost 43% of its audience in its second weekend, falling to tenth place with a second weekend gross of $2.9 million, and bringing its ten-day gross to $10.9 million. It ended up grossing just $20.3 million in the United States. While the film was made on a modest budget of $8 million, Universal spent $12 million on a costly unsuccessful marketing campaign, which effectively prevented the film from turning a profit.

=== Critical response ===
On review aggregation website Rotten Tomatoes, the film has an approval rating of 27% based on 15 reviews, with an average rating of 4.4/10. On Metacritic, it has a score of 46 out of 100 based on 17 reviews indicating "mixed or average" reviews.

Charles Solomon of the Los Angeles Times criticized the filmmakers for not deciding "whether they're making a with-it musical for teen-agers or re-creating the ingenuous humor of a '60s TV show". He also criticized the film's use of CGI, claiming it makes the 2D characters "look as though they stumbled in from another film. Their prominent shadows give them an odd, plastic texture, but don't help them fit into the computerized world." Siskel & Ebert gave this film two thumbs down, citing both the story and the animation as having "no imagination whatsoever". Roger Ebert later named it one of the ten worst films of 1990.

Janet Maslin of The New York Times wrote the film would "appeal only to small children, and only to the most patient among them. On the positive side, it has a bright, perky look and a few amusing gadgets, like the machine that bathes and washes George Jetson after ejecting him from his bed...On the other hand, the film isn't any more fascinating than the television cartoon series that inspired it. It's only longer." William Thomas of Empire gave the film two out of five stars, stating "it's not nearly exciting enough and at an hour and twenty minutes is overlong for animation fans, yet by virtue of the fact it's a cartoon, it presents itself as too childish for older live action devotees."

== See also ==
- List of films based on television programs
- List of films based on Hanna-Barbera cartoons
