= George Jetson =

American cartoon character

- The Jetsons character
- First appearance: "Rosey the Robot"; The Jetsons; September 23, 1962
- Created by: William Hanna; Joseph Barbera
- Voiced by: George O'Hanlon (1962–1989); Herb Duncan (1962; The Jetsons: New Songs of the TV Family of the Future); Don Messick (1965, 1978, 1980, 1982; The Jetsons in First Family On The Moon, Geometric Jetson, Down to Earth Nutrition, Learning About Work with The Jetsons); Jeff Bergman (1984, 1990–present); Billy West (1984, 1999, 2004; WBCN commercial, RadioShack commercial, Electrasol commercial); Keith Scott (1992, 1997; Toyota commercial, Hanna Barbera Gala Celebrity Nite); Greg Burson (1993; This Land is Our Land: The Yogi Bear Environmental Album); Seth MacFarlane (2000, 2007; Family Guy); Scott Innes (Toshiba commercial); Wally Wingert (2004, 2017; Harvey Birdman, Attorney at Law, LG Electronics commercial); Skeet Ulrich (2009; Robot Chicken); Robert Kazinsky (2013; Robot Chicken)

In-universe information
- Full name: George J. Jetson
- Species: Human
- Gender: Male
- Occupation: Digital index operator at Spacely's Space Sprockets
- Spouse: Jane Jetson (wife)
- Children: Elroy Jetson (son); Judy Jetson (daughter)
- Relatives: Montague Jetson (grandfather); Harvey Birdman (ancestor)
- Birthday: c. 2022
- Catchphrase: "Hooba-Dooba!"

George J. Jetson is a fictional character from the animated television series The Jetsons. He is the patriarch of the Jetson family. He is the husband of Jane Jetson and the father of teenage daughter Judy and son Elroy.

== Fictional character biography ==
George resides with his family and his dog Astro in the Skypad Apartments in Orbit City, in a future with the trappings of science fantasy depictions of American life in the future, such as robot servants, flying saucer–like cars, and moving walkways. All the apartment buildings are set on giant poles, resembling Seattle's Space Needle; the ground is almost never seen. In Jetsons: The Movie, it is revealed that they live in the sky due to excess of smog.

When George was a child, he had to fly through 10 miles (16 kilometres) of asteroid storms to go to Orbit High School, where he was the star pitcher of its Spaceball team. George is now an employee at Spacely's Space Sprockets, a manufacturer of "sprockets" and other high-tech equipment. His job title is "digital index operator." His boss is Cosmo G. Spacely, noted for being short in both height and temper. Spacely usually treats George his other employees in a rather tyrannical fashion. George's job primarily requires him to repeatedly push a single button or a series of buttons on a computer named RUDI — short for "Referential Universal Digital Indexer" — in the 1980s series of Jetsons episodes. George complains of his heavy work load, pushing a button as many as five times for three hours, three days a week. Often, Mr. Spacely will fire George in a fit of anger, only to hire him back by the end of the same episode.

Physically, George is a slim man of average height with short red hair and a cartoonish, large nose. His personality is that of a well-meaning, caring father, but he is often befuddled and stressed out by the problems of both his work and his family life. As with most Hanna-Barbera productions of the 1950s and early 1960s, George Jetson was modeled after a contemporary celebrity; in George's case, it was character actor George O'Hanlon, who also voiced and granted his name to the character. O'Hanlon was well-known for his roles as a common everyman and once said of his character: "George Jetson is an average man. He has trouble with his boss, he has problems with his kids, and so on. The only difference is that he lives in the next century."

=== Date of birth ===
In the 2020s, fans, fact checkers and journalists debated the character's birthdate. In July 2022, the character resurfaced on social media when fans claimed that George's birthday was July 31, 2022. Despite the claim, no official evidence has been found confirming this or any other specific date, although there is some evidence from the show that the year of his birth is 2022.

== Catchphrase ==
George's most famous catchphrase is "Jane! Stop this crazy thing!", heard at the end credits of the 1960s Jetsons episodes, but is also known for frequently uttering the phrase "hooba-dooba-dooba!" or "hooba-dooba" in most episodes to express wonder or astonishment, possibly inspired by Fred Flintstone's phrase "Yabba-dabba-doo!".

== Portrayer ==
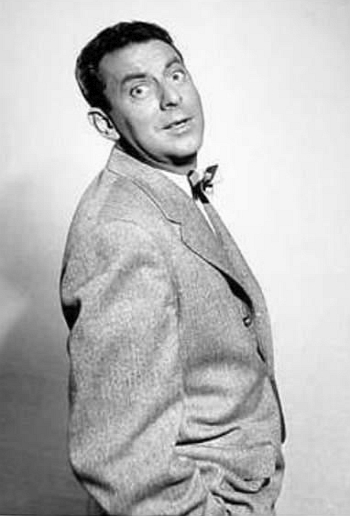
George O'Hanlon voiced and served as a model for the character.

Morey Amsterdam was originally hired to voice the character, but was fired due to sponsor conflicts between his numerous other projects, including The Dick Van Dyke Show. Amsterdam sued Hanna-Barbera for breach of contract, but lost.

George O'Hanlon, hired after auditioning, but failing to win the role of Fred Flintstone two years prior, became George Jetson's voice actor, a role he would retain for the rest of his life through both the sixties and eighties versions of the cartoon series. O'Hanlon last did the voice for George Jetson in Jetsons: The Movie, which was released posthumously.

The current voice of George Jetson is Jeff Bergman, who voiced George (and also Mr. Spacely) in some parts of the movie after O'Hanlon's death, and also voiced George in The Funtastic World of Hanna-Barbera as well as for the cameo in the Harvey Birdman, Attorney at Law episode "Shaggy Busted" and Spümcø's two Jetsons cartoons: Father & Son Day and The Best Son, as well as in the 2017 film The Jetsons & WWE: Robo-WrestleMania!

In the Harvey Birdman, Attorney at Law episode "Back to the Present", George was voiced by Wally Wingert. In the episode, the Jetsons return to the past to sue the planet for causing global warming, hiring George's ancestor, Harvey Birdman, as their attorney.

== Media ==
=== Television series ===
- The Jetsons
- Harvey Birdman, Attorney at Law
- Jellystone!

=== Films and specials ===
- The Jetsons Meet the Flintstones: a 1987 made-for-TV movie for syndication
- Rockin' with Judy Jetson: a 1988 made-for-TV movie for syndication
- A Yabba Dabba Doo Celebration: 50 Years of Hanna-Barbera: a 1989 TV special celebrating 50 years of Hanna-Barbera Productions
- Jetsons: The Movie: a 1990 animated feature released by Universal Pictures
- The Jetsons & WWE: Robo-WrestleMania!: a 2017 direct-to-video movie released by Warner Home Video
- Space Jam: A New Legacy a 2021 animated feature released by Warner Bros. Pictures

== Other appearances ==
- George Jetson also appears at the Cedar Fair Entertainment Company and formerly Universal Studios Florida as a meetable character (until c.2002, when the Funtastic World of Hanna-Barbera was closed) seen in 1996 video called "Kids for Character".
- George Jetson also appeared in a brief, silent cameo in an episode of Fantastic Max, alongside Space Ghost and The Great Gazoo.
- George Jetson, along with his family, Rosie, and Mr. Spacely can be seen in a MetLife commercial in 2012.
- George Jetson appeared in The Flintstones: The Rescue of Dino & Hoppy video game in 1991.
- George Jetson also made a few cameo appearances on episodes of Family Guy, The Powerpuff Girls, Dexter's Laboratory, The 2020 revival of Animaniacs, and Teen Titans Go!
- George Jetson makes a cameo appearance in Space Jam: A New Legacy alongside his family, Astro, Rosie, and several other Hanna-Barbera and Warner Bros. characters.
