= The Flintstones: The Surprise at Dinosaur Peak =

1993 video game

- European box art
- Developers: Taito; Sol Corporation
- Publisher: Taito
- Designers: S. Sakakibara; S. Nishiyama
- Programmers: Yoichi Soki; Misako Kawamura; Tsutomu Hagiwara; Osamu Ikarashi; M. Matsumoto; Y. Suzuki
- Artists: Makoto Sonoda; Yoko Kaneko; Kazuhiro Ohhara; Tōru Kawaishi
- Composer: Misako Ogata
- Platform: Nintendo Entertainment System
- Release: NA: October 1993; EU: 1994
- Genre: Platform
- Mode: Single-player

The Flintstones: The Surprise at Dinosaur Peak is a platform game for the Nintendo Entertainment System released by Taito in 1993. The game was never released in Japan unlike its predecessor The Flintstones: The Rescue of Dino & Hoppy.

== Gameplay ==
The player can switch playable characters between both Fred and Barney, and they both have different attacks and abilities. Barney, a friend of Fred's, has a slingshot that he can employ at a specific range to assault adversaries, while Fred can use a club to pound opponents. Some parts of the game require different strategies, often cases where you will have to swap one to another automatically in order to get past certain obstacles or jump onto certain platforms. Fred can also throw an item that will stun or completely kill an enemy or boss.

== Release ==
The Flintstones: The Surprise at Dinosaur Peak is believed to have been released in North America exclusively to Blockbuster Video as a rental title. Though despite constantly being cited as such in modern online reviews and websites, no evidence has been found. Some have even refuted the claim by saying that the game was sold in regular stores. Despite this, it remains one of the rarest games for the NES due to its late release during the console's production cycle and a low number of copies produced. As of 2017 copies of the game available on eBay and other similar sites usually sell for over $800 USD to as high as $1,500 as of 2016. In Europe, the game is slightly more common and cheaper but still typically sells for over US$1,000.

== Reception ==
Reception

Review scores
Publication	Score
AllGame	4/5
Ação Games	12/16; 11/16

Allgame gave a review score of 4 out of 5 stars, criticizing the recycled animation from the previous Flintstones game while noting the polished graphics and praising the ability to switch between Fred and Barney and both characters having different weapons and abilities.
