= Patric Zimmerman =

American actor (born 1954)

- Born: Patric Laine Zimmerman; October 10, 1954 (age 71); Los Angeles, California
- Occupation: Voice actor
- Years active: 1985–2008
- Spouse: Kris Zimmerman (m. 1985; div. 1993)

Patric Laine Zimmerman (born October 10, 1954 in Los Angeles, California) is a retired American voice actor. He is best known for voicing Revolver Ocelot in the English-language version of the Metal Gear series from 1998 to 2008.

== Career ==
Due to Daws Butler's death in 1988, he voiced Elroy Jetson in the 1990 film Jetsons: The Movie. He also did the voices of Augie Doggie and Dixie in the Hanna-Barbera series Fender Bender 500 and Yo Yogi!, both roles that Butler had originated. He continued his career in the 1990s where he provided the voices for characters in the animated television series TaleSpin and Tom & Jerry Kids.

In 1995, Zimmerman appeared in person in the 1995 movie Stripteaser with Maria Ford and Rick Dean.

As of 2008, Zimmerman is retired from voice acting.

== Personal life ==
Zimmerman was married to voice director Kris Zimmerman from approximately 1985 until 1992–1993.

== Filmography ==
=== Film ===
- Jetsons: The Movie (1990) – Elroy Jetson
- Eddie Presley (1992) – Cook
- Metal Gear Solid: Digital Graphic Novel (2013) - Revolver Ocelot (Blu-ray re-release with newly recorded English dub)
- Metal Gear Solid 2: Bande Dessinée (2013) - Revolver Ocelot (Blu-ray re-release with newly recorded English dub)

=== Television ===
- Pound Puppies (1986) – Charlie, Boy Scout, Boy at the Dance, Shaky
- Popeye and Son (1987) - Additional voices
- Teenage Mutant Ninja Turtles (1987-1996) - Mario
- The New Yogi Bear Show (1988) – Additional voices
- Yogi and the Invasion of the Space Bears (1988) – Ranger Brown
- TaleSpin (1990) – Joe Cropduster
- Tom & Jerry Kids (1990–1993) – Tyke
- Wake, Rattle, and Roll (Fender Bender segment) – Augie Doggie, Dixie
- Yo Yogi! (1991) – Augie Doggie, Dixie, Ding-A-Ling Wolf
- Toxic Crusaders (1991) – Junkyard
- Capitol Critters (1992) – Felix
- The Shnookums & Meat Funny Cartoon Show (1995) – Obediah the Wonder Raccoon
- The Grim Adventures of Billy & Mandy (2005–2007) – Dan Blort, Beetle, additional voices

=== Video games ===
- Metal Gear Solid (1998) – Revolver Ocelot
- Metal Gear Solid 2: Sons of Liberty (2001) – Revolver Ocelot
- Metal Gear Solid: The Twin Snakes (2004) – Revolver Ocelot
- Dead Rising (2006) – Commanding Officer
- Metal Gear Solid 4: Guns of the Patriots (2008) – Liquid Ocelot
- Metal Gear Solid: Master Collection Vol. 1 (2023) - Revolver Ocelot (archived audio)
- Metal Gear Solid: Master Collection Vol. 2 (2026) - Liquid Ocelot (archived audio)

=== Theme parks ===
- The Funtastic World of Hanna-Barbera (ride) (1990) – Elroy Jetson
