= Rockin' with Judy Jetson =

- DVD cover
- Written by: Charles M. Howell IV; Kevin Hopps
- Directed by: Paul Sommer
- Starring: Janet Waldo; George O'Hanlon; Daws Butler; Penny Singleton; Don Messick; Jean Vander Pyl; Mel Blanc; Rob Paulsen; Ruth Buzzi; Cindy McGee; Pat Musick; Charlie Adler; Selette Cole; Pat Fraley
- Music by: Sven Libaek; Hoyt Curtin (music from The Jetsons)
- Country of origin: United States
- Original language: English

Production
- Executive producers: William Hanna; Joseph Barbera
- Producer: Kay Wright
- Running time: 92 minutes
- Production company: Hanna-Barbera Productions

Original release
- Network: Syndication
- Release: September 18, 1988

Related
- Scooby-Doo and the Ghoul School

Rockin' with Judy Jetson (also known as Judy Jetson and the Rockers) is a 1988 animated television film produced by Hanna-Barbera for syndication as part of the Hanna-Barbera Superstars 10 series.

== Plot ==
When intergalactic rock star named Sky Rocker plays a concert at the Cosmic Coliseum, Judy Jetson and her friends, Iona and Starr, go into orbit. Starry-eyed Judy meets her idol and gives him a song she has written just for him, "Rockin' Round the Galaxy". But also at the concert are Quark and Quasar, bumbling henchmen to the evil, music-hating Felonia Funk. They are carrying a secret code that will unlock the powers of the Mental Flosser and enable Felonia to control the universe and banish music forever.

The secret code accidentally gets switched with Judy's song, and Sky unwittingly turns it into a new rock hit. A depressed Judy takes refuge at the Crater Club, where her father George, disguised as a punk-rocker, tries to save her from Sky. But Sky has already been kidnapped by Felonia, and then Judy disappears. Her captors, however, are the Zoomies, an outer-space race of party animals who love music and desires of vanquishing Felonia.

Felonia finds Judy and prepares to do away with her and Sky. They escape, but Felonia has already activated the Mental Flosser. Then Judy and Sky hit on the solution that will stop Felonia – music! They jam on Judy's song and send the beat vibrating around the galaxy. The sound overpowers the Mental Flosser and vanquishes Felonia. With the galaxy now safe, Sky resumes his tour, but as his real identity Billy Booster, with Judy as his new opening act.

== Voice cast ==
- Janet Waldo as Judy Jetson
- Mel Blanc as Cosmo Spacely
- Daws Butler as Elroy Jetson
- Don Messick as Astro the Space Mutt, Additional Voices
- George O'Hanlon as George Jetson
- Penny Singleton as Jane Jetson
- Jean Vander Pyl as Rosie
- Charlie Adler as Quark, Zappy
- Michael Bell as Quasar
- P.L. Brown as High Loopy Zoomy
- Steve Bulen as Additional Voices
- Ruth Buzzi as Felonia Funk
- Hamilton Camp as Mr. Microchips, Manny
- Selette Cole as Rhoda Starlet
- Peter Cullen as Gruff, Commander Comsat, Bouncer
- Pat Fraley as Zilchy
- Cindy McGee as Iona
- Pat Musick as Starr, Fan Club President, Zowie
- Rob Paulsen as Sky Rocker/Billy Booster, Zany
- Eric Suter as Nicky Neuron
- B.J. Ward as Zippy, Judy Jetson (singing voice)
- Beau Weaver as Ramm Rocket, Dee-Jay

== Musical numbers ==
Songs by: William Hanna, Joseph Barbera, Thomas Chase, Steve Rucker, Todd Hayen, Charles M. Howell IV and John Debney

1. "Rockin' 'Round the Galaxy" - Judy, Sky Rocker, Company, Zoomies
2. "Airport Welcome" - Judy, Iona, Starr
3. "Jupiter Jump" - Sky Rocker
4. "Gleep Glorp" - Sky Rocker, Judy, Iona, Starr
5. "Shootin' Star" - Judy, Iona, Starr, Sky Rocker, Gruff
6. "Surfin' in Space" - Judy, Iona, Starr, Zoomies
7. "A House Full of Love Is a Home" - Judy

== Home media ==
Hanna-Barbera Home Video released Rockin' with Judy Jetson on VHS on May 18, 1989. On August 9, 2011, Warner Archive issued a DVD in NTSC picture format with all region encoding, as part of their Hanna–Barbera Classics Collection. This is a Manufacture-on-Demand (MOD) release, available exclusively through Warner's online store and Amazon.com.

When released on Boomerang's streaming service, two additional scenes absent from the VHS issue are included, one of journalists being checked in at Sky Rocker's concert, the other an imagine spot showing Elroy's view of what home life would be like if Judy became a superstar.

The film was released on Blu-ray as part of a Hanna-Barbera Superstars 10 boxset through Warner Archive on February 20, 2024. The film was remastered in HD.
