= The Flintstones: The Rescue of Dino & Hoppy =

1991 video game

- North American box art
- Developers: Taito; Sol Corporation
- Publisher: Taito
- Designers: Isao Matono; S. Nishiyama
- Programmers: Misako Kawamura; Keiichi Saito
- Artists: Toshihiko Kodama; Makoto Saitoh; Tōru Kawaishi; Isao Matono; S. Nishiyama
- Composers: Yasuko Yamada; Naoto Yagishita
- Platform: Nintendo Entertainment System
- Release: NA: December 1991; EU: April 30, 1992; JP: August 7, 1992
- Genre: Action platformer
- Mode: Single-player

The Flintstones: The Rescue of Dino & Hoppy (Japanese: フリントストーン The Rescue of Dino & Hoppy) is a 1991 platform video game by Taito for the Nintendo Entertainment System and based on the animated series The Flintstones. Taito would later release another Flintstones game for the NES titled The Flintstones: The Surprise at Dinosaur Peak in 1993.

An unauthorised ROM hack of the game featuring the head of Mario superimposed over Fred Flintstone's, titled 7 Grand Dad, gained notoriety online after it was played on a 2014 livestream by Joel "Vargskelethor" Johansson of the Vinesauce streaming collective. The ROM hack, as well as Johansson's shocked reaction to its title screen, later became long-standing memes both within Johannson's community and on the wider Internet.

== Gameplay ==
The gameplay is preceded by a short cutscene which sets the stage, where the Flintstones and the Rubbles are enjoying their lives in Bedrock. That's when a man from the 30th century named Dr. Butler kidnaps Fred's pet Dino and Barney's pet Hoppy. Fred's alien friend, Gazoo, lost parts of his time machine due to Dr. Butler. Gazoo is visible only to Fred and to nobody else (a slight change from the series where Barney, Pebbles and Bamm-Bamm could also see him).

With each stage Fred completes, he earns back another piece of the time machine, and Gazoo welds together the pieces progressively. Throughout the stages, Fred runs into Wilma, Barney, Betty, as well as George Jetson in the future stage. Fred has to defeat a boss at each stage. At the end of the map, he gets the last piece and travels to the future, where he has to defeat Dr. Butler.

== Reception ==
GamePro praised the graphics, gameplay, and the abundance of levels, but criticized the music. AllGame gave a review score of 4 out of 5 stars, praising the game as a first-rate platform with bright colorful graphics that mimic the cartoon series, stating "Fred is easy to control, and his ability to club enemies and climb ledges goes a long way towards making the gameplay feel different from other titles in the genre".
