= George O'Hanlon =

American actor and writer (1912–1989)

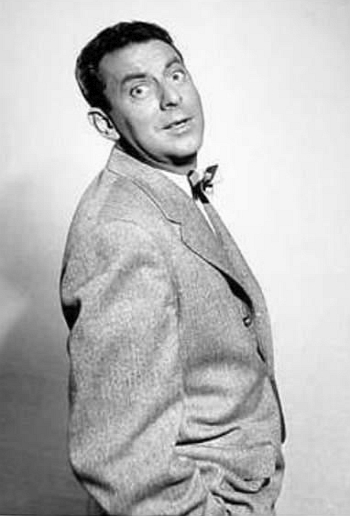
- O'Hanlon as Calvin Dudley in The Life of Riley
- Born: November 23, 1912; Brooklyn, New York, US
- Died: February 11, 1989 (aged 76); Burbank, California, US
- Resting place: Valley Oaks Memorial Park, Westlake Village, California, US
- Occupations: Actor; comedian; writer
- Years active: 1932–1989
- Spouses: Inez Witt (m. 1932; div. 1948) Martha Stewart (m. 1949; div. 1952) Nancy Owens (m. 1953)
- Children: 2

George O'Hanlon (November 23, 1912 – February 11, 1989) was an American actor, comedian and writer. He was best known for his role as Joe McDoakes in the Warner Bros.' live-action Joe McDoakes short subjects from 1942 to 1956 and as the voice of George Jetson in Hanna-Barbera's 1962 prime-time animated television series The Jetsons, its 1985 revival and its 1990 film adaptation, which was his final acting role.

== Early life ==
George O'Hanlon was born on November 23, 1912, in Brooklyn, New York, the son of the actor George Samuel "Sam Rice" O'Hanlon (1874–1946) and the dancer and actress Lulu Alice O'Hanlon (née Beeson, 1882–1953).

== Career ==
=== Radio ===
The George O'Hanlon Show debuted on the Mutual Broadcasting System on November 9, 1948. O'Hanlon portrayed Joe McDoakes, and Willard Waterman portrayed McDoakes's boss.

=== Film ===
From the early 1940s, O'Hanlon was a character actor in feature films, usually playing the hero's streetwise, cynical friend. He appeared in features for various studios while continuing the Joe McDoakes role for Warner Bros. After the McDoakes series lapsed in 1956, O'Hanlon returned to character work, mostly in television (two rare post-McDoakes movie appearances are in Bop Girl Goes Calypso and Kronos, both from 1957).

=== Television ===
In the 1953–54 season, O'Hanlon appeared several times on NBC's The Dennis Day Show. In 1957, he played Charlie Appleby on an I Love Lucy episode, "Lucy and Superman". O’Hanlon played a character listed as “Caldwell” in a 1958 episode of Maverick, entitled “Rope of Cards”, S1 E17. In 1958, O'Hanlon played a New York publicist for a fashion model in How to Marry a Millionaire.

In 1960, he originally auditioned for the role of Fred Flintstone for the Hanna-Barbera Productions animated series The Flintstones, but lost the role to Alan Reed.

In 1962–63, he voiced one of his most prominent characters, George Jetson in the original The Jetsons, a role he would reprise over 20 years later in two additional seasons from 1985 to 1987.

In the autumn of 1964, he appeared as a cab driver in the 13-episode CBS drama The Reporter. In 1966, O'Hanlon appeared opposite Jackie Gleason as Ralph Kramden's loudmouthed "bum brother-in-law", on Gleason's first TV show of the 1966-67 season. He also made various appearances on ABC's Love, American Style, a series for which he wrote the teleplays and also directed several episodes.

In 1971, O'Hanlon appeared as a bear trainer on The Partridge Family, season 2, episode 6, "Whatever Happened to Moby Dick?", a drunk, who was jailed with Oscar and Felix in a memorable episode of The Odd Couple, season 2, episode 6, "Murray the Fink," and a drunk in Adam-12, season 4 episode 1, "Extortion".

=== Writer ===
Apart from acting, he wrote screenplays and also wrote the storyboard for nearly all of the Joe McDoakes shorts. He wrote stories for television series in the 1960s such as Petticoat Junction, 77 Sunset Strip, and wrote episodes for Hanna-Barbera's The Flintstones; however, he was remembered when it was time to cast The Jetsons and Morey Amsterdam, the original choice to voice the lead male role, was unavailable due to sponsor conflicts. He once said: "George Jetson is an average man, he has trouble with his boss, he has problems with his kids, and so on. The only difference is that he lives in the next century."

== Personal life ==
O'Hanlon was married to Inez Witt from 1932 to 1948. After divorcing her, he married actress Martha Stewart in 1949; they divorced in 1952.

O'Hanlon and his third wife, Nancy, had two children; actor George O'Hanlon Jr., and daughter Laurie O'Hanlon. They remained married until his death.

== Death ==
In the mid-1980s, Hanna-Barbera revived The Jetsons and brought back its original voice cast of O'Hanlon, Daws Butler, Mel Blanc, Don Messick, Penny Singleton, Jean Vander Pyl, and Janet Waldo. O'Hanlon was blind and had limited mobility as a result of a stroke. He recorded his dialogue in a separate session from the other cast by having lines read to him by the recording director Gordon Hunt and then reciting them one at a time.

On February 11, 1989, just after he finished recording his dialogue for Jetsons: The Movie, O'Hanlon complained of a headache and was taken to Saint Joseph's Hospital in Burbank, California, where he died of a second stroke. According to Andrea Romano, who was Hanna-Barbera's casting director at the time, O'Hanlon found it difficult to read and hear, and in the end, he died doing what he loved. The film was dedicated to both him and Jetsons co-star Mel Blanc, who died nearly five months later. Jeff Bergman was hired to record additional dialogue for both actors for the movie.

== Filmography ==
=== Film ===
| Year | Title | Role | Notes |
|---|---|---|---|
| 1932 | The Death Kiss | Bystander / Man Sitting on Curb | Uncredited |
| 1933 | High Gear | Reporter / Spectator in Grandstand | Uncredited |
| 1934 | Beggar's Holiday | Bellhop | Uncredited |
| 1935 | The Girl Friend | Chorus Boy in Play | Uncredited |
| 1937 | Hollywood Hotel | Casting Assistant | Uncredited |
| 1938 | Blondes at Work | Third Newsboy | Uncredited |
| 1938 | Women Are Like That | Page | Uncredited |
| 1938 | My Lucky Star | Student in Girls of Hampshire Hall Skit | Uncredited |
| 1938 | Secrets of an Actress | Flowers Delivery Boy | Uncredited |
| 1938 | Brother Rat | Orderly | Uncredited |
| 1939 | The Adventures of Jane Arden | Crapshooter | Uncredited |
| 1939 | Daughters Courageous | Dancer | Uncredited |
| 1939 | Hell's Kitchen | Usher | Uncredited |
| 1939 | Dust Be My Destiny | Man at Bank After Robbery | Uncredited |
| 1939 | Off the Record | Messenger Boy | Uncredited |
| 1939 | A Child Is Born | Young Husband | Uncredited |
| 1939 | Swanee River | Ticket Taker | Uncredited |
| 1940 | The Fighting 69th | Eddie Kearney | Uncredited |
| 1940 | Saturday's Children | Office Worker at Party | Uncredited |
| 1940 | Sailor's Lady | Sailor | |
| 1940 | The Bride Wore Crutches | Copy Boy | Uncredited |
| 1940 | City for Conquest | Newsboy | Uncredited |
| 1940 | Spring Parade | Peasant | Uncredited |
| 1941 | The Great Awakening | Peppi | |
| 1941 | Navy Blues | Sailor | Uncredited |
| 1941 | Moon Over Her Shoulder | Bellboy | Uncredited |
| 1942 | Man from Headquarters | Weeks, Reporter | |
| 1942 | Yokel Boy | Teller | Uncredited |
| 1942 | A Gentleman After Dark | Hotel bellboy | Uncredited |
| 1942 | Remember Pearl Harbor | Radio Operator | Uncredited |
| 1942 | Criminal Investigator | Powers | |
| 1942–1956 | Joe McDoakes | Joe McDoakes | Short film series |
| 1943 | Ladies' Day | Bond Buyer | Uncredited |
| 1943 | Action in the North Atlantic | Navy Pilot | Uncredited |
| 1943 | All by Myself | Buck | Uncredited |
| 1943 | Two Tickets to London | Sailor | Uncredited |
| 1943 | Hers to Hold | Coast Guardsman with Tommy Gun | Uncredited |
| 1943 | Corvette K-225 | RCAL Wireless Operator | Uncredited |
| 1943 | Nearly Eighteen | Eddie | |
| 1944 | Resisting Enemy Interrogation | American Pilot at Headquarters | Uncredited |
| 1947 | The Hucksters | Freddie Callahan | Uncredited |
| 1947 | The Spirit of West Point | Joe Wilson | |
| 1947 | Heading for Heaven | Alvin Ponacress | |
| 1948 | Are You with It? | Buster | |
| 1948 | The Counterfeiters | Frankie Dodge | |
| 1948 | June Bride | Scott Davis | |
| 1949 | Joe Palooka in the Big Fight | Louie | |
| 1949 | Zamba | Marvin | |
| 1951 | The Tanks Are Coming | Sergeant Tucker | |
| 1952 | Room for One More | Minor Role | Uncredited |
| 1952 | The Lion and the Horse | 'Shorty' Cameron | |
| 1952 | Park Row | Steve Brodie | |
| 1952 | Cattle Town | Shiloh | |
| 1953 | So You Want to Learn to Dance | Joe McDoakes | Short film |
| 1956 | Battle Stations | Patrick Mosher | |
| 1957 | Kronos | Dr. Arnold Culver | |
| 1957 | Bop Girl Goes Calypso | Barney | |
| 1958 | The Vanishing Duck | George (voice) | Short film Uncredited |
| 1971 | The Million Dollar Duck | Parking Attendant | |
| 1972 | Now You See Him, Now You Don't | Ted | |
| 1973 | Charley and the Angel | Harry, Police Chief | |
| 1976 | Rocky | TV Commentator #2 | |
| 1990 | Jetsons: The Movie | George Jetson (voice) | Additional lines by Jeff Bergman; dedicated in memory; posthumous release |

=== Television ===
| Year | Title | Role | Notes |
|---|---|---|---|
| 1954 | The Dennis Day Show | Himself | Episode: "The Old Vaudevillian" |
| 1955–1961 | Make Room for Daddy | Policeman, Chick | Unknown episodes |
| 1956 | Sneak Preview | | Episode: "Real George" |
| 1957 | I Love Lucy | George Appleby | Episode: "Lucy and Superman" |
| 1958 | Maverick | Morton Connors, Cousin Elmo & Caldwell | 3 episodes |
| 1962–1963, 1985–1987 | The Jetsons | George Jetson, Russian Reporter, Molecular Motors Video Man, Drummer (voices) | 75 episodes |
| 1971 | The Partridge Family | Bear Man | Episode: "Whatever Happened to Moby Dick?" |
| 1973 | Mission: Impossible | Captain Douglas | Episode: "The Question" |
| 1974 | Sanford and Son | Drunk | Episode: "Ol' Brown Eyes" |
| 1974 | Walt Disney's Wonderful World of Color | Herb Evans | Episode: "The Whiz Kid and the Mystery at Riverton: Part 1 & 2" |
| 1986–1988 | The Flintstone Kids | Additional voices | 34 episodes |
| 1987 | The Jetsons Meet the Flintstones | George Jetson (voice) | Television film |
| 1988 | Rockin' with Judy Jetson | George Jetson (voice) | Television film |
| 1989 | Hanna-Barbera's 50th: A Yabba Dabba Doo Celebration | George Jetson (voice) | Television special; aired five months after his death |

== Production work ==
| Year | Title | Position | Notes |
|---|---|---|---|
| 1942–1956 | Joe McDoakes | Screenwriter for most of the shorts | Short film series |
| 1959 | The Rookie | Director, screenwriter | |
| 1959–1960 | The Ann Sothern Show | Writer | 2 episodes |
| 1962–1963 | The Gallant Men | Writer | 2 episodes |
| 1963 | Grindl | Writer | 2 episodes |
| 1963 | 77 Sunset Strip | Writer | 2 episodes |
| 1964 | For Those Who Think Young | Screenwriter | |
| 1965 | Petticoat Junction | Writer | 2 episodes |
| 1966 | The Flintstones | Writer | Episode: "Curtain Call at Bedrock" |
| 1965–1966 | Gilligan's Island | Writer | 2 episodes |
| 1966 | Jackie Gleason: American Scene Magazine | Writer | Episode: "The Honeymooners: The Adoption" |
| 1967 | The Jackie Gleason Show | Writer | Episode: "The Honeymooners: The Adoption" |
| 1968 | I Sailed to Tahiti with an All Girl Crew | Writer | Story |
| 1973 | Love, American Style | Writer | Segment: "Love and the Model Apartment" |

| Preceded by None | Voice of George Jetson; 1962–1989 | Succeeded by Jeff Bergman |
