= World Fairy Tale Series =

Japanese anime anthology series

- Genre: Adventure; Fantasy; Romance
- Written by: Yumi Kageyama; Etsuo Suzuki; Yasunori Yamada; Aya Matsui; Yoshimasa Takahashi
- Directed by: Hiroshi Shidara (chief)
- Composers: Seiji Yokoyama (J); Enzo Draghi (W)
- Countries of origin: Japan; Italy
- Original language: Japanese
- No. of seasons: 1
- No. of episodes: 26

Production
- Producers: Yoshifumi Hatano; Shinji Shimizu
- Running time: 24 minutes
- Production companies: Toei Animation; Fuji Eight; Reteitalia

Original release
- Network: Fuji TV
- Release: 7 April – 29 September 1995

World Fairy Tale Series (Note: Known in Japan as: Sekai Meisaku Dōwa Shirīzu: Wao! Meruhen Ōkoku (世界名作童話シリーズ・ワ～ォ！メルヘン王国; lit. 'World Masterpiece Fairy Tale Series: Wow! Fairy Tale Kingdom') (Fuji TV title); Anime Sekai no Dōwa (アニメ世界の童話; lit. 'World Fairy Tale Anime') (VHS release); Sekai Meisaku Mukashi Banashi (世界名作昔ばなし; lit. 'World Masterpiece Folktales') (DVD/Blu-ray release)) (Note: Known in Italy as Fiabissime.) is an Italian-Japanese animated anthology series based on fairy tales and classic stories, produced by Toei Animation, Fuji Eight and Reteitalia in 1995.

== Premise ==
The series consists of 26 episodes, each one adapting a popular fairy tale or a literature classic written by a famous author such as the Brothers Grimm, Charles Perrault, Hans Christian Andersen, Carlo Collodi, Lewis Carroll, Alexandre Dumas, Howard Pyle, Jonathan Swift, Johanna Spyri, L. Frank Baum, E. T. A. Hoffmann, James Halliwell-Phillipps and Jeanne-Marie Leprince de Beaumont. Most of the episodes follow quite closely the original source material, with some changes made to alter unhappy endings or to suit the half-hour episode run. Between 1975 and 1983 Toei had already produced a similar series, titled World Famous Fairy Tale Series. Some of these fairy tales had also been adapted by Toei into feature length films (Arabian Nights: The Adventures of Sinbad, The World of Hans Christian Andersen, The Wonderful World of Puss 'n Boots, Hans Christian Andersen's The Little Mermaid, Thumbelina and Aladdin and the Wonderful Lamp).

A variety of different artists from other Toei's popular series worked on the episodes, such as Sailor Moon's director Junichi Sato and character designer Ikuko Itoh, or Space Pirate Captain Harlock and Saint Seya's composer Seiji Yokoyama.

The series premiered in France in October 1994 in a collection of VHS, and later aired in December on France 3 (Les Contes les plus célèbres). It aired in Italy on Italia 1 from February 4 to March 1, 1995 (Le fiabe più belle), and in Japan on Fuji TV and other networks from April 7 to September 29 of the same year. Only 21 episodes were broadcast in Japan, with the last 5 episodes being released on home video. An 8 DVD box containing 24 episodes was released in Japan by Toei Video, skipping episodes 10 and 26.

The Italian dub featured different incidental music composed by Enzo Draghi, and it served as a basis for the French, Spanish, Polish, Romanian and Greek dubs as well. The series was also popular in the Middle East, airing on Spacetoon.

== Cast ==
- Mami Koyama as the Narrator (all episodes)
- Aya Hisakawa as Beauty (ep. 3), Morgiana (ep. 15)
- Bin Shimada as Talking Cricket (ep. 7), White Rabbit (ep. 14), Scarecrow (ep. 21)
- Chafurin as Big Man (ep. 12)
- Chie Satō as Stepsister (ep. 2), 3rd Kid (ep. 13)
- Chiyoko Kawashima as Queen (ep. 11)
- Daisuke Gōri as Lamp Genie (ep. 1), Head Thief (ep. 15), M. de Treville (ep. 19)
- Daisuke Sakaguchi as Much (ep. 10), Fritz (ep. 20)
- Eiko Masuyama as Evil Queen (ep. 8)
- Hideo Ishikawa as Man A (ep. 22)
- Hikaru Midorikawa as Prince (ep. 2), Robin Hood, Swallow (ep. 16), Prince (ep. 24)
- Hirohiko Kakegawa as Beauty's Father (ep. 3), Santa Claus (ep. 5), Friar Tuck (ep. 10), Porthos (ep. 19)
- Hiroko Emori as the Blue Fairy (ep. 7), the Duchess, the Good Witch of the North (ep. 21)
- Hisako Kyōda as Grandma (ep. 17)
- Hisao Egawa as Farmer (ep. 4), Dwarf C (ep. 8), Guy of Gisborne (ep. 10), Thief B (ep. 15)
- Ikuya Sawaki as Ogre (ep. 4), King (ep. 11), Emperor of Lilliput (ep. 18), Minister A (ep. 22)
- Jōji Yanami as Geppetto (ep. 7), Donkey (ep. 23)
- Jun'ichi Kanemaru as Prince (ep. 11)
- Junko Hagimori as Lampwick (ep. 7), Good Fairy (ep. 11), Constance (ep. 19)
- Kazue Komiya as the Queen of Hearts (ep. 14)
- Kazumi Tanaka as Father (ep. 5), Dwarf A (ep. 8), Skinny Man (ep. 12), Locksmith (ep. 15), The Tin Man (ep. 21)
- Kazunari Tanaka as Prince John (ep. 10), Cheshire Cat (ep. 14), Athos (ep. 19)
- Keiko Yamamoto as First Pig (ep. 9), Cat (ep. 23)
- Ken Yamaguchi as Cassim (ep. 15)
- Kōhei Miyauchi as Drosselmeyer (ep. 20)
- Kōji Totani as Magician (ep. 1), Wolf (ep. 13)
- Konami Yoshida as 7th Kid (ep. 13)
- Kōzō Shioya as King (ep. 4), Little John (ep. 10), Mouse King (ep. 20), Swindler B (ep. 22)
- Kyoko Terase as Milady de Winter (ep. 19)
- Mariko Kouda as Gretel
- Masaharu Satō as Sultan (ep. 1), King (ep. 12), King of Hearts (ep. 14), Finance Minister (ep. 18), Louis XIII (ep. 19)
- Masako Katsuki as the Wicked Witch of the West (ep. 21), Sea Witch (ep. 24)
- Masato Hirano as Owner (ep. 7), Secretary (ep. 10), Prime Minister (ep. 18), Jussac (ep. 19), Minister B (ep. 22)
- Minami Takayama as Pinocchio
- Naoki Tatsuta as Cat (ep. 7), Mad Hatter (ep. 14), Swindler A (ep. 22)
- Nobutoshi Canna as Prince (ep. 8), Aramis (ep. 19)
- Noriko Uemura as Woman A (ep. 22)
- Osamu Saka as Admiral (ep. 18)
- Rumi Kasahara as Alice
- Ryōtarō Okiayu as Aladdin
- Sanshiro Nitta as Beekeeper (ep. 13), Clown Doll (ep. 20), Minister C (ep. 22)
- Shigeru Nakahara as the March Hare
- Shinichiro Ohta as Servant A (ep. 11), Ali Baba, Rooster (ep. 23)
- Takaya Hashi as Gulliver
- Takeshi Aono as Cardinal Richelieu (ep. 19), Dog (ep. 23)
- Tesshō Genda as Wolf (ep. 17)
- Tomiko Suzuki as Hansel
- Tomoko Maruo as Miller's Son (ep. 4), 1st Kid (ep. 13), Cassim's Wife (ep. 15)
- Toshihiko Seki as D'Artagnan (ep. 19)
- Tsutomu Kashiwakura as 2nd Son (ep. 12), Nutcracker (ep. 20)
- Wakana Yamazaki as Beauty's Sister (ep. 3), Thumbelina, Princess Annabella (ep. 24)
- Yasuhiko Kawazu as Servant (ep. 2), Dwarf D (ep. 8), Big Bad Wolf (ep. 9), Hunter (ep. 17), Man B (ep. 22)
- Yasuhiro Takato as Puss in Boots
- Yoku Shioya as 3rd Son (ep. 12)
- Yūji Machi as Ring Genie (ep. 1), Magic Mirror (ep. 14)
- Yuka Koyama as Princess (ep. 1), Dorothy Gale (ep. 21), Princess Lina (ep. 24)
- Yūko Minaguchi as Cinderella
- Yumi Tōma as The Little Match Girl
- Yuri Amano as Snow White
- Yuri Shiratori as Sleeping Beauty
- Yusaku Yara as the Beast (ep. 3), The Wizard (ep. 21)

== Episodes ==
No.	Title	Directed by	Written by	Original release date
1	"Aladdin and the Magic Lamp"; Transliteration: "Arajin to mahō no ranpu" (Japanese: アラジンと魔法のランプ)	Hiroshi Shidara	Etsuo Suzuki	7 April 1995
2	"Cinderella"; Transliteration: "Shinderera" (Japanese: シンデレラ)	Hiroki Shibata	Aya Matsui	14 April 1995
3	"Beauty and the Beast"; Transliteration: "Bijo to yajū" (Japanese: 美女と野獣)	Ryo Tachiba	Yumi Kageyama	21 April 1995
4	"Puss in Boots"; Transliteration: "Nagagutsu wohaita neko" (Japanese: 靴をはいた猫)	Toru Yamada	Yasunori Yamada	28 April 1995
5	"Hansel and Gretel"; Transliteration: "Henzeru to Gureteru" (Japanese: ヘンゼルとグレーテル)	Kiyoko Sayama	Yumi Kageyama	12 May 1995
6	"The Little Match Girl"; Transliteration: "Macchi uri no shōjo" (Japanese: マッチ売りの少女)	Tomohara Katsumata	Yumi Kageyama	19 May 1995
7	"Pinocchio"; Transliteration: "Pinokio" (Japanese: ピノキオ)	Atsutoshi Umezawa	Etsuo Suzuki	26 May 1995
8	"Snow White"; Transliteration: "Shirayukihime" (Japanese: 白雪姫)	Michihiro Kanayama	Yoshimasa Takahashi	2 June 1995
9	"The Three Little Pigs"; Transliteration: "Sanbiki nokobuta" (Japanese: 三匹のこぶた)	Jōji Shimura	Aya Matsui	9 June 1995
10	"Robin Hood"; Transliteration: "Robin Fuddo" (Japanese: ロビンフッド)	Tsunekiyo Otani	Yasunori Yamada	16 June 1995
11	"Sleeping Beauty"; Transliteration: "Nemure ru mori no bijo" (Japanese: 眠れる森の美女)	Masayuki Akehi	Yumi Kageyama	23 June 1995
12	"The Golden Goose"; Transliteration: "Kin nogachō" (Japanese: 金のがちょう)	Takashi Kobayashi	Etsuo Suzuki	7 July 1995
13	"The Wolf and the Seven Young Goats"; Transliteration: "Ookami to nanahiki no ko yagi" (Japanese: 狼と七匹の子やぎ)	Yûji Endô	Yasunori Yamada	14 July 1995
14	"Alice in Wonderland"; Transliteration: "Fushigi no kuni no Arisu" (Japanese: 不思議の国のアリス)	Hiroki Shibata	Yumi Kageyama	21 July 1995
15	"Ali Baba and the 40 Thieves"; Transliteration: "Ari Baba to 40 nin no tōzoku" (Japanese: アリババと40人の盗賊)	Yasuo Ishikawa	Etsuo Suzuki	28 July 1995
16	"Thumbelina"; Transliteration: "Oyayubi hime" (Japanese: おやゆび姫)	Junichi Sato	Yumi Kageyama	11 August 1995
17	"Little Red Riding Hood"; Transliteration: "Aka Zukin" (Japanese: 赤ずきん)	Takao Yoshizawa	Yumi Kageyama	18 August 1995
18	"Gulliver's Travels"; Transliteration: "Gariba ryokōki" (Japanese: ガリバー旅行記)	Ryo Tachiba	Yoshimasa Takahashi	25 August 1995
19	"The Three Musketeers"; Transliteration: "Sanjūshi" (Japanese: 三銃士)	Toshihiko Arisako	Yasunori Yamada	1 September 1995
20	"The Nutcracker"; Transliteration: "Kurumi wari ningyō" (Japanese: くるみ割り人形)	Tsunekiyo Otani	Aya Matsui	8 September 1995
21	"The Wizard of Oz"; Transliteration: "Ozu no mahōtsukai" (Japanese: オズの魔法使い)	Yasuo Ishikawa	Yumi Kageyama	29 September 1995
22	"The Emperor's New Clothes"; Transliteration: "Hadakano ōsama" (Japanese: はだかの王様)	Toru Yamada	Etsuo Suzuki	N/A
23	"Town Musicians of Bremen"; Transliteration: "Buremen no ongakutai" (Japanese: ブレーメンの音楽隊)	Jōji Shimura	Yasunori Yamada	N/A
24	"The Little Mermaid"; Transliteration: "Ningyohime" (Japanese: 人魚姫)	Yukio Kaizawa	Yumi Kageyama	N/A
25	"Sindbad the Sailor"; Transliteration: "Shindobaddo no bōken" (Japanese: シンドバッドの冒険)	Michihiro Kanayama	Etsuo Suzuki	N/A
26	"Heidi"; Transliteration: "Haiji" (Japanese: ハイジ)	Hiroshi Shidara	Aya Matsui	N/A
