= Diaper Man =

- Nickname of American musician Garry Shider
- Diaper Man, a cartoon superhero in The Mighty Heroes
