= Secrets of the Cryptkeeper's Haunted House =

- Genre: Children's television Game show
- Created by: Eytan Keller; Jack Wohl
- Directed by: Eytan Keller
- Presented by: Steve Saunders
- Narrated by: John Kassir as The CryptKeeper
- Theme music composer: Robert J. Walsh; Danny Elfman
- Country of origin: United States

Production
- Executive producers: Richard Donner; David Giler; Walter Hill; Joel Silver; Robert Zemeckis; Eytan Keller; Jack Wohl
- Producer: Julia Gilbert
- Running time: 30 minutes
- Production companies: Keller Productions; The Wohl Company; Tales from the Crypt Productions; Goldwyn Entertainment Company

Original release
- Network: CBS
- Release: September 14, 1996 – August 23, 1997

Secrets of the Cryptkeeper's Haunted House is an American children's Saturday-morning game show that aired on CBS from September 14, 1996, to August 23, 1997. It featured the Cryptkeeper of Tales from the Crypt (with John Kassir as the voice) now serving as an announcer. It is the last TV series in the Tales from the Crypt franchise. The series was taped at Universal Studios Florida.

The rights of the property was held by Samuel Goldwyn Television, who picked up the property in 1995.

Secrets of the Cryptkeeper's Haunted House received a Daytime Emmy nomination for Outstanding Game Show in 1997, losing to fellow CBS program The Price Is Right. The series is one of only two children's game shows to be nominated in this category, to be followed by BrainSurge in 2012. The series was replaced 3 weeks later by Wheel 2000, a kids version of Wheel of Fortune.

== Game summary ==
Two teams of kids (one team wearing red shirts; the other team, black shirts, and both teams usually named for a creature commonly perceived as scary, for example Beasts vs. Vermin) competed in five events. Four of the events were a constant, with the fifth event varying from one week to the next.

- Fireball Alley had one member of each team defending a set of six headstones from the fireballs of the computer-generated skull named Digger (voiced by Danny Mann). Aside from defending the headstones, the player had to keep from being knocked off the very unstable bridge and being vaporized via CGI effects, and appearing to explode. For each headstone that remained, Digger would give a list of four items, and for each list that the team identified the common bond, the team got five points for a possible total of 30 points. If all of the headstones were knocked over, the round was ended, and the player could not score any points, though they would not be vaporized.
- Worminator was usually the second round, and required both players to cross a wind tunnel while exchanging balls at three strategic points. Any dropped balls would be vaporized (as were any players that fell off the platform, though this ended the round) and no longer in play. At the end of the tunnel was a pair of bins; every ball deposited into either bin netted the team 10 points. If all three balls were dropped, or if the team did not deposit any balls in the bins within 35 seconds, both teammates were vaporized. If at anytime the team fails to exchange balls at any one of the strategic points, they will be disqualified.
- The Incredible Shrinking Room was always the third round, and required teams to find the missing letter in each of six words within 40 seconds. The category for the list was the same for both teams, and was told to the home audience by Digger, the skull from Fireball Alley. They needed to collect the appropriate tiles, place them in their proper slots and shout out the word at the very top of the list. However, the wall and ceiling would close in on the team with several seconds remaining, thus making it important to get all of the words beforehand. Each correctly spelled word was worth 5 points, but if they solved all six and shouted out the word at the top of the list before the time expired, they received an additional 10 points for a possible total of 40 points.
- The Swamp from Hell was an occasional stand-in for the Worminator. One player started outside the house, jumping on a trampoline in an effort to grab skulls off hooks for 15 seconds. Each skull snatched meant that one bag of skulls was placed on a platform by a CGI lava pit. On the other side of the lava pit was another platform, and the two were bridged by a balance beam. Once the player stepped on a platform, they had 60 seconds to transport as many of the bags of skulls to the other platform as possible, earning five points for each one (the player could make as many trips as needed). Falling off the balance beam at any point would vaporize the player, ending the round (though the team still kept the points). In addition, as the 60-second time limit counted down, a cage containing the player's teammate lowered towards the lava pit. If time ran out before all of the bags were across, the teammate in the cage would reach the lava pit and be vaporized.

== Fourth-round games ==
- Ghost Battle required only one player from each team to compete. They met up with Digger (now with a full skeleton body) to engage in a 90-second joust. However, the player needed to strike the skeleton's shield to score. If a player made five hits on the shield, the skeleton would fly up into the air with an explosion, and the player scored five points. Presumably, falling off the platform would vaporize the player, though no players ever fell off. (Digger never actively struck at the player to try to force them back.)
- The Abyss had one member of the team attempt to scale a cliff littered with numbers, with the aid of three rope ladders. The other team member feeds the player up to 5 questions with numerical answers to the one on the cliff, who then tries to negotiate his/her way to the right number and press the button next to it. Each right answer earns 5 points; the stunt goes for 90 seconds or until the player on the cliff falls off the ladders and is vaporized (although the team would still keep the points), or when all 5 questions are used up. The maximum point total was 25 points. On a couple of occasions, this was the second stunt, and the Worminator took the fourth-round slot.
- Endless Hallway required one player to walk on the equivalent of a treadmill for 75 seconds. It was this player's job to walk through the hall and take note of the various items encountered. The teammate, waiting outside, was presented with five different Match Game-style blanks to fill in. Upon being told what item was encountered in the hallway, it was the teammate's job to match the item to the corresponding blank to score five points.
- Vampire's Lair called for both players to compete. One player went into a room, which would light up via strobe lights for a few seconds and go dark. Then, the player outside would guide the player in the room to the middle of the room by looking at a video feed from a night vision camera. In the middle of the room was a switch that, when thrown, would awaken the vampire. Each team had one minute and 45 seconds to reach this switch, and the team that used less time to wake the vampire would receive 20 points. If neither team reached the vampire, however, no points were awarded. Note: In one occasion, Time ran out on a team despite the player activating the lights on the vampire a few seconds later.

== Final round ==
- Skullduggery was the endgame of the day. One member of each team entered the haunted house one last time in search of skulls. The players would usually search four or five rooms: the Master Deadroom, the Mummy's Tomb, the Hall of Horror, and the Dungeon. (The Creepatorium comes between the Hall of Horror and Dungeon in some episodes.) In certain rooms, there were stagehands called "skull snatchers," whose job it was to steal the collected skulls from players who ventured too close. When the buzzer sounded, they had to move on to the next room. After all of the rooms were searched, they had to race out of the house and, with the help of their teammates, stack all the skulls onto a large skewer. The first team to stack enough skulls to fill their skewer, or, failing that, the team that found the most skulls won 50 points. If both teams have the same number of skulls, whoever completed their skewer faster won the points. In most cases, the 50 points was enough to win the game. Usually, the winning team would receive Apple computers, while the runners up would receive a set of the Grolier New Book of Knowledge.
