= Andersen Monogatari =

Andersen Monogatari may refer to:

- The World of Hans Christian Andersen, a 1968 Toei Animation feature film
- Andersen Monogatari (TV series), a 1971 Mushi Production television series
