= Strong Man =

- Ring name of American professional wrestler Jon Andersen
- Strong Man, a cartoon superhero in The Mighty Heroes
