= Thumbelina (1978 film) =

Japanese animated film

- Japanese theatrical release poster
- Directed by: Yūgo Serikawa
- Written by: Ikuko Ōyabu; Kōichi Tsunoda
- Story by: Hans Christian Andersen
- Based on: Thumbelina by Hans Christian Andersen
- Produced by: Takeshi Ariga; Yoshio Takami
- Starring: See voice cast
- Edited by: Ryohichi Toba; Yutaka Chikura
- Music by: Shunsuke Kikuchi
- Production company: Toei Animation
- Distributed by: Toei Company (Japan); Turner Program Services (North America)
- Release date: 18 March 1978 (Japan)
- Running time: 64 minutes
- Country: Japan
- Language: Japanese
- Box office: ¥647,51 million

Thumbelina (世界名作童話 おやゆび姫, Sekai Meisaku Dōwa: Oyayubi-hime; lit. 'World Masterpiece Fairy Tales: Thumb Princess') is a 1978 Japanese anime fantasy film produced by Toei Animation and Tezuka Productions based on the fairy tale of the same name by Hans Christian Andersen. The film was first shown in Japan on 18 March 1978 in the Toei Manga Matsuri ('Toei Cartoon Festival'). The film saw "Father of Manga" Ozamu Tezuka as character designer and former Mushi Production's animator Kazuko Nakamura as assistant animation director upon Tezuka's recommendation.

It represents the second entry in Toei's World Masterpiece Fairy Tales film series, preceded by The Wild Swans (1977) and followed by Twelve Months (1980), Swan Lake (1981) and Aladdin and the Wonderful Lamp (1982). It is also the fourth Toei film to be based on Andersen's works, after The World of Hans Christian Andersen (1968), Hans Christian Andersen's The Little Mermaid (1975) and the already mentioned The Wild Swans.

== Plot ==
Thumbelina, a girl no bigger than a thumb, is born from a tulip and raised by a childless lady. One day while she is playing with her best friend Buzzer the beetle, Thumbelina meets the Prince of Tulips who falls in love with her and rename her Maya. That same evening she is kidnapped by two frogs who want to give her in marriage to their son, but the young frog, moved to pity lets Thumbelina go away with Buzzer. With the arrival of winter she finds shelter underground in the lair of the kind mouse Mrs. Chumi. Here Thumbelina catches the attention of Mr. Mogul, a rich mole who asks for her hand in marriage. After various hardships, Thumbelina is able to find the prince she was looking so much for.

== Voice cast ==
Character	Original version (Japanese) [original version]	Turner Program Services version (English)
Thumbelina (おやゆび姫)	Kazuko Sugiyama (杉山佳寿子)	Corinne Orr
Bunbu (ブンブー) (Buzzer in English)	Mariko Miyagi (宮城まり子)	Lionel Wilson
Narrator (ナレーター )	Kyoko Kishida (岸田今日子)	Peter Fernandez
Gekoo (ゲコオ) (The Frog)	Kyoko Kishida (岸田今日子)	
Chumi (チュミ) (The Mouse)	Masako Nozawa (野沢雅子)	
Mole (モグラ) (Mr Mogul in English)	Kosei Tomita (富田耕生)	
Papa Frog (かえる父さん)	Ichiro Nagai (永井一郎)	
Mama Frog (かえる母さん)	Kazue Takahashi (高橋和枝)	
Prince (王子様)	Noriko Ohara (小原乃梨子)	

=== Additional voices ===
- Sanji Hase (はせさん治), Rihoko Yoshida (吉田理保子), Michiko Nomura (野村道子), Keiko Yamamoto (山本圭子), Masako Saito (斉藤昌子)

== Music ==
The songs were composed by Shunsuke Kikuchi and performed by Columbia Orchestra, while lyrics were written by Etsuko Bushika.

1. "Always in a Dream" (ゆめでいつでも, Yume de itsu demo) (singers: Kumiko Ōsugi and The Will Beads)
2. "Gekogeko Song" (ゲコゲコソング, Gekogeko songu) (singers: Kyoko Kishida and The Aoni Trio)

== International releases ==
Like The Wild Swans, the film was dubbed in English in 1983 by Sound Shop Inc. in New York under the direction of Peter Fernandez, and released by Turner Program Services. It was later released on VHS in 1984 by RCA Columbia Pictures Home Video. The film was also released in Spanish, French, Italian, German, Hungarian, Polish, Russian and Arabic.
