= Samuel Goldwyn Television =

Television company

- Logo used from 1989 to 1997
- Type: Division
- Industry: Television
- Founded: 1979; 47 years ago
- Founder: Samuel Goldwyn Jr.
- Defunct: 1997; 29 years ago
- Fate: Folded into MGM Television
- Successor: MGM Television
- Products: Television series
- Parent: The Samuel Goldwyn Company

Samuel Goldwyn Television was the American television production/distribution division of The Samuel Goldwyn Company. Formed in 1979 by Samuel Goldwyn Jr., the company's best-known series was the competition series American Gladiators, which was produced and distributed by the company from 1989 to 1996. In 1987, Samuel Goldwyn Television bought Victor Alexander's film Kill Zone, which was turned into the 18-picture package The Explosives. The library of Samuel Goldwyn Television also included some episodes of the series Flipper, Gentle Ben, The Mothers-in-Law and The New Adventures of Flipper.

In 1995, the company obtained the rights from the Tales from the Crypt team to develop a game show Secrets of the Cryptkeeper's Haunted House, slated for 1996.

On 22 December 1996, hours after PolyGram had made an acquisition offer that was accepted, Metromedia made a counter-offer for Goldwyn's film and television library, and won the bid. Samuel Goldwyn Television was merged into Orion Pictures. In 1997, it was sold to MGM Television and folded later in the year.

== Titles by Samuel Goldwyn Television ==
- Flipper (1964–1967) (distributor)^{1}
- GamePro TV (1990–1991) (distributor)
- American Gladiators (1989–1996) (distributor)
- Why Didn't I Think of That? (1992)
- Gladiators 2000 (1994–1996)
- Wild West Showdown (1994)
- Flipper (Flipper – The New Adventures) (1995–2000) (1995–1997 SGTV, 1998–2000 MGM TV)
- Secrets of the Cryptkeeper's Haunted House (1996–1997) (as Goldwyn Entertainment Company)

== Footnotes ==
1. The rights to Flipper were later acquired by The Samuel Goldwyn Company, and in turn acquired by MGM Television (the company that originally produced the series). MGM owns full rights to the series; the series copyright is held by MGM's subsidiary Orion Pictures (whose own holdings include the Goldwyn library).
