= List of Mazinger Z episodes =

This is a list of episodes of the 1972 Japanese animated television series Mazinger Z (マジンガーZ, Majingā Zetto). The episodes originally aired from December 3, 1972, to September 1, 1974, on Fuji Television.

== Episodes ==
No.	Title	Directed by	Written by	Original release date
1	"Birth of the Miraculous Robot"; Transliteration: "Kyōi no robotto tanjō" (Japanese: 驚異のロボット誕生)	Yūgo Serikawa	Susumu Takaku	December 3, 1972
2	"Stop the Ashura Army!"; Transliteration: "Sutoppu za Ashura gundan" (Japanese: ストップ ザ あしゅら軍団)	Toshio Katsuta	Susumu Takaku	December 10, 1972
3	"The Plan to Annihilate Mazinger Z"; Transliteration: "Majingā Z shōmetsu sakusen" (Japanese: マジンガーZ 消滅作戦)	Tomoharu Katsumata	Keisuke Fujikawa	December 17, 1972
4	"Mazinger Z in Peril!"; Transliteration: "Majingā Z zettai zetsumei!!" (Japanese: マジンガーZ 絶体絶命！！)	Nobuo Ōnuki	Keisuke Fujikawa	December 24, 1972
5	"Ghost Mazinger Arrives"; Transliteration: "Gōsuto Majingā shutsugen" (Japanese: ゴーストマジンガー出現)	Tokue Shirane	Susumu Takaku	December 31, 1972
6	"Dr. Hell's Two Great Mechanical Beasts"; Transliteration: "Dokutā Heru no ni daiki kaijū" (Japanese: ドクター・ヘルの二大機械獣)	Toshio Katsuta	Keisuke Fujikawa	January 7, 1973
7	"Baron Ashura's Great Plan"; Transliteration: "Ashura danshaku no daibōryaku" (Japanese: あしゅら男爵の大謀略)	Yasuo Yamayoshi	Keisuke Fujikawa	January 14, 1973
8	"The Truth Behind Abdora the Destroyer!"; Transliteration: "Daimajin Abudora no shōtai!!" (Japanese: 大魔神 アブドラの正体！！)	Akinori Ōrai	Keisuke Fujikawa	January 21, 1973
9	"Deimos F3 is the Spawn of Satan"; Transliteration: "Deimosu F3 wa akuma no otoshigo" (Japanese: デイモスF3は悪魔の落し子)	Tomoharu Katsumata	Susumu Takaku	January 28, 1973
10	"Daian, the Flying Metal Hand"; Transliteration: "Soratobu tetsuwan Daian" (Japanese: 空飛ぶ鉄腕ダイアン)	Yoshio Takami	Keisuke Fujikawa	February 4, 1973
11	"Destroy the Legendary Galen Cannon!"; Transliteration: "Maboroshi no kyohō Garen o bakuha se yo!!" (Japanese: 幻の巨砲ガレンを爆破せよ！！)	Tokue Shirane	Susumu Takaku	February 11, 1973
12	"Traitor! The Enlarged Robot, Vikong!"; Transliteration: "Uragirimono! Kyodaika robotto Baikongu" (Japanese: 裏切者！巨大化ロボット・バイコング)	Nobuo Ōnuki	Susumu Takaku	February 18, 1973
13	"The Devil's Rolling Attack!"; Transliteration: "Akuma no daikaiten kōgeki!!" (Japanese: 悪魔の大回転攻撃！！)	Toshio Katsuta	Keisuke Fujikawa	February 25, 1973
14	"Rage! The Sleeping Giant, Spartan!"; Transliteration: "Ikare! Nemureru kyojin Suparutan" (Japanese: 怒れ！眠れる巨人スパルタン)	Nobuo Ōnuki	Susumu Takaku	March 4, 1973
15	"The Mechanical Beast Tidal Wave Plot"; Transliteration: "Kikaijū ōtsunami sakusen" (Japanese: 機械獣 大津波作戦)	Tomoharu Katsumata	Keisuke Fujikawa	March 11, 1973
16	"Orders to Assassinate Kōji Kabuto!"; Transliteration: "Kabuto Kōji ansatsu shirei!!" (Japanese: 兜甲児 暗殺指令！！)	Toshio Katsuta	Keisuke Fujikawa	March 18, 1973
17	"The Underground Mechanical Beast, Holzon V3"; Transliteration: "Chitei kikaijū Horuzon V3" (Japanese: 地底機械獣 ホルゾンV3)	Nobutaka Nishizawa	Keisuke Fujikawa	March 25, 1973
18	"The Ocean Gang Pirate Glossam!"; Transliteration: "Umi no gyangu kaizoku Gurossamu!" (Japanese: 海のギャング 海賊グロッサム！)	Tokue Shirane	Susumu Takaku	April 1, 1973
19	"The Flying Demon Beast, Deviler X!"; Transliteration: "Hikō majū Debirā X!!" (Japanese: 飛行魔獣 デビラーX！！)	Yasuo Yamayoshi	Keisuke Fujikawa	April 8, 1973
20	"The Storm-Calling Mechanical Beast, Stronger"; Transliteration: "Arashi o yobu kikaijū Sutorongā" (Japanese: 嵐を呼ぶ機械獣ストロンガー)	Yoshikatsu Kasai	Susumu Takaku	April 15, 1973
21	"Showdown in a Ghost Town"; Transliteration: "Gōsuto Taun no kettō" (Japanese: ゴースト・タウンの決闘)	Nobuo Ōnuki	Keisuke Fujikawa	April 22, 1973
22	"Pursue the Undersea Fortress, Salude!"; Transliteration: "Tsuigeki!! Kaitei yōsai Sarūdo" (Japanese: 追撃！！海底要塞サルード)	Takashi Hisaoka	Keisuke Fujikawa	April 29, 1973
23	"Mechanical Beast Dam-Dam and The Great Wheel Plan"; Transliteration: "Kikaijū Damudamu daisharin sakusen" (Japanese: 機械獣ダムダム 大車輪作戦)	Tokue Shirane	Keisuke Fujikawa	May 6, 1973
24	"Mach Mechanical Beast Jinrai"; Transliteration: "Mahha kikaijū Jinrai" (Japanese: マッハ機械獣 ジンライ)	Nobutaka Nishizawa	Keisuke Fujikawa	May 13, 1973
25	"The Aeros Brothers and the Great Eruption Plot"; Transliteration: "Earosu san kyōdai daifunka sakusen" (Japanese: エアロス三兄弟 大噴火作戦)	Nobuo Ōnuki	Keisuke Fujikawa; Yasutaka Nagai	May 20, 1973
26	"Clash! The Samurai Kōji Vs. Ashura's Mechanical Beast"; Transliteration: "Gekitotsu! Samurai Kōji tai Ashura kikaijū" (Japanese: 激突！サムライ甲児対あしゅら機械獣)	Yasuo Yamayoshi	Susumu Takaku	May 27, 1973
27	"Operation: Capture Aphrodite A"; Transliteration: "Afurodai A ikedori sakusen" (Japanese: アフロダイA 生捕り作戦)	Yoshikatsu Kasai	Susumu Takaku	June 3, 1973
28	"Treacherous Orders: The Plot to Steal Alloy Z"; Transliteration: "Kuroi shirei chōgōkin ryakudatsu sakusen" (Japanese: 黒い指令 超合金略奪作戦)	Takashi Hisaoka	Hiroichi Fuse	June 10, 1973
29	"Mazin Power Turnaround!"; Transliteration: "Daigyakuten Majin Pawā!!" (Japanese: 大逆転 マジンパワー！！)	Nobutaka Nishizawa	Keisuke Fujikawa	June 17, 1973
30	"Shirō in Peril! Move Out, Mazinger Z!"; Transliteration: "Ayaushi Shirō Majingā Z shutsudō se yo!!" (Japanese: 危うしシロー マジンガーZ出動せよ！！)	Tokue Shirane	Susumu Takaku	June 24, 1973
31	"The Hostage-Taking Mechanical Beast and the EM Wave Plot"; Transliteration: "Hitojichi kikaijū denjiha sakusen" (Japanese: 人質機械獣 電磁波作戦)	Yoshikatsu Kasai	Keisuke Fujikawa	July 1, 1973
32	"The Horrifying Three-Headed Mechanical Beast"; Transliteration: "Kyōfu no mikkubi kikaijū" (Japanese: 恐怖の三っ首機械獣)	Yūgo Serikawa	Hiroyasu Yamaura	July 8, 1973
33	"Aerial Raid! Baras K, Outlaw of the Skies!"; Transliteration: "Daikūshū! Barasu K wa sora no muhōsha" (Japanese: 大空襲！バラスKは空の無法者)	Nobuo Ōnuki	Susumu Takaku	July 15, 1973
34	"Crimson Lightning! Mazinger Z Flies!"; Transliteration: "Akai inazuma soratobu Majingā" (Japanese: 紅い稲妻 空とぶマジンガー)	Takashi Hisaoka	Susumu Takaku	July 22, 1973
35	"The Fierce Attack of the Reaper Mechanical Beast, Deathma"; Transliteration: "Shinigami kikaijū Desuma no mōshū" (Japanese: 死神機械獣 デスマの猛襲)	Nobutaka Nishizawa	Keisuke Fujikawa	July 29, 1973
36	"The Transforming Mechanical Beast in the Five Great Lakes"; Transliteration: "Go daiko ni sumu henshin kikaijū" (Japanese: 五大湖にすむ変身機械獣)	Tokue Shirane	Susumu Takaku	August 5, 1973
37	"Messenger from the Dark: The Deadly Scrander"; Transliteration: "Yami kara no shisha Sukurandā hissatsu" (Japanese: 闇からの使者 スクランダー必殺)	Nobuo Ōnuki	Yasutaka Nagai	August 12, 1973
38	"The Mysterious Robot, Minerva X"; Transliteration: "Nazo no robotto Mineruba X" (Japanese: 謎のロボット ミネルバX)	Yūgo Serikawa	Keisuke Fujikawa	August 19, 1973
39	"Suicide Challenge! Salude in the Scarlet Ocean"; Transliteration: "Sutemi no chōsen! Shinku no umi no Sarūdo" (Japanese: 捨身の挑戦！真紅の海のサルード)	Yoshikatsu Kasai	Susumu Takaku	August 26, 1973
40	"Count Brocken, The Demonic Ruler"; Transliteration: "Akuma no shihaisha Burokken hakushaku" (Japanese: 悪魔の支配者 ブロッケン伯爵)	Takeshi Shirato	Susumu Takaku	September 2, 1973
41	"Broken Wings: Death Battle in the Skies"; Transliteration: "Oreta tsubasa ōzora no shitō" (Japanese: 折れた翼 大空の死闘)	Yūgo Serikawa	Susumu Takaku	September 9, 1973
42	"The Demon's Command! Attacks from Sky and Ground"; Transliteration: "Ma no shirei!! Kūriku shūchūkōgeki" (Japanese: 魔の指令！！空陸集中攻撃)	Yasuo Yamayoshi	Keisuke Fujikawa	September 16, 1973
43	"Assault! The Paratrooper Ambush"; Transliteration: "Totsugeki! Parashūto kishū butai" (Japanese: 突撃！！パラシュート奇襲部隊)	Tokue Shirane	Susumu Takaku	September 23, 1973
44	"The Great Charge of the New Submarine Fortress, Bood!"; Transliteration: "Daishingeki!! Shin kaitei yōsai Būdo" (Japanese: 大進撃！！新海底要塞ブード)	Nobuo Ōnuki	Keisuke Fujikawa	September 30, 1973
45	"The Devil's Target: The Photon Power Laboratory!"; Transliteration: "Akuma no hyōteki kōshiryoku kenkyūjo!!" (Japanese: 悪魔の標的 光子力研究所！！)	Yoshikatsu Kasai	Keisuke Fujikawa	October 7, 1973
46	"The Ninja Twin Mechanical Beasts Appear"; Transliteration: "Ninpō futago kikaijū tōjō" (Japanese: 忍法ふたご機械獣登場)	Nobutaka Nishizawa	Susumu Takaku	October 14, 1973
47	"The Fiercely Hellish Double Plan!"; Transliteration: "Sōzetsu! Jigoku no W sakusen" (Japanese: 壮絶！地獄のW作戦)	Masamune Ochiai	Hiroyasu Yamaura	October 21, 1973
48	"Boss Robot Joins the Battle!"; Transliteration: "Bosu robotto sentō kaishi!!" (Japanese: ボスロボット 戦闘開始！！)	Yūgo Serikawa	Keisuke Fujikawa	October 28, 1973
49	"Hard Fight Against a Mad Robot"; Transliteration: "Hakkyō robotto daifunsen" (Japanese: 発狂ロボット 大奮戦)	Yasuo Yamayoshi	Susumu Takaku	November 4, 1973
50	"The Jet Scrander, Shot Down!"; Transliteration: "Gekitsui!! Jetto Sukurandā" (Japanese: 撃墜！！ジェット・スクランダー)	Tokue Shirane	Keisuke Fujikawa	November 11, 1973
51	"Hell's Assassins: The Skull Army!"; Transliteration: "Jigoku no ansatsusha dokuro gundan!" (Japanese: 地獄の暗殺者 ドクロ軍団！)	Nobuo Ōnuki	Susumu Takaku	November 18, 1973
52	"Kōji's in Trouble! Sayaka Deploys in Mazinger!"; Transliteration: "Kōji pinchi! Sayaka Majingā shutsudō!" (Japanese: 甲児ピンチ！さやかマジンガー出動！)	Yūgo Serikawa	Hiroyasu Yamaura	November 25, 1973
53	"Two-Stage Transformation: The Dizzying Beast!"; Transliteration: "Nidan henshin!! Mekuramashi kikaijū" (Japanese: 二段変身！！目くらまし機械獣)	Nobutaka Nishizawa	Keisuke Fujikawa	December 2, 1973
54	"Explosion! The Powerful Rocket Punch!"; Transliteration: "Sakuretsu!! Kyōryoku roketto panchi!!" (Japanese: 炸裂！！強力ロケットパンチ！！)	Tokue Shirane	Keisuke Fujikawa	December 9, 1973
55	"Mt. Fuji: The Great Ski Plan"; Transliteration: "Fujisan daichokakkō sakusen" (Japanese: 富士山 大直滑降作戦)	Katsuhisa Yamada	Susumu Takaku	December 16, 1973
56	"Stolen Super Alloy Z!"; Transliteration: "Gōdatsu sareta chōgōkin Z!" (Japanese: 強奪された超合金Z！)	Nobutaka Nishizawa	Susumu Takaku	December 23, 1973
57	"Dr. Hell Takes Japan!"; Transliteration: "Dr. Heru Nippon senryō!!" (Japanese: Dr.ヘル 日本占領！！)	Yūgo Serikawa	Keisuke Fujikawa	December 30, 1973
58	"The Front Line Base, Hell Castle!"; Transliteration: "Zensen kichi jigokujō!!" (Japanese: 前戦基地 地獄城！！)	Tsunekiyo Ōtani	Keisuke Fujikawa	January 6, 1974
59	"Hell Castle and the Demon's Battle Proclamation!"; Transliteration: "Jigokujō akuma no sentō sengen!!" (Japanese: 地獄城 悪魔の戦闘宣言！！)	Takeshi Shirato	Keisuke Fujikawa	January 13, 1974
60	"Mazinger Z's Secret Weapon Launches!"; Transliteration: "Majingā Z himitsu heiki hassha!!" (Japanese: マジンガーZ 秘密兵器発射！！)	Kōichi Sasaki	Keisuke Fujikawa	January 20, 1974
61	"Robot of Destiny: The Song of Rhine X"; Transliteration: "Shukumei no robotto Rain X no uta" (Japanese: 宿命のロボット ラインXの歌)	Nobutaka Nishizawa	Susumu Takaku	January 27, 1974
62	"A Bird?! A Plane?! No, It's Boss Borot!"; Transliteration: "Igai?! Bosu robotto kūchū hikō" (Japanese: 意外？！ボスロボット空中飛行)	Yūgo Serikawa	Hiroyasu Yamaura	February 3, 1974
63	"The Beauty and the Bombs"; Transliteration: "Bakudan o kakaeta bishōjo" (Japanese: 爆弾を抱えた美少女)	Takeshi Shirato	Keisuke Fujikawa	February 10, 1974
64	"The Female 007 vs. Brocken's Assassin"; Transliteration: "Onna 007 tai Burokken satsujinki" (Japanese: 女007対ブロッケン殺人鬼)	Katsuhisa Yamada	Susumu Takaku	February 17, 1974
65	"The Balloon Bombs Brought in on the Wind!"; Transliteration: "Kaze ga hakonda fūsen bakudan!!" (Japanese: 風が運んだ風船爆弾！！)	Kōichi Sasaki	Keisuke Fujikawa	February 24, 1974
66	"The Invisible Killer Jenova M9"; Transliteration: "Sugata naki koroshiya Jenoba M9" (Japanese: 姿なき殺し屋 ジェノバM9)	Tsunekiyo Ōtani	Susumu Takaku	March 3, 1974
67	"Don't Cry, Kōji! The Life Upon the Cross"; Transliteration: "Naku na Kōji! Jūjika ni kaketa inochi" (Japanese: 泣くな甲児！十字架にかけた命)	Yūgo Serikawa	Hiroyasu Yamaura	March 10, 1974
68	"Hell's Bodyguard, Archduke Gorgon"; Transliteration: "Jigoku no yōjinbō Gōgon taikō" (Japanese: 地獄の用心棒 ゴーゴン大公)	Takeshi Shirato	Keisuke Fujikawa	March 17, 1974
69	"The Hover Pilder's Mid-Air Meltdown!"; Transliteration: "Kūchū yōkai! Hobā Pairudā" (Japanese: 空中溶解！ホバーパイルダー)	Nobutaka Nishizawa	Susumu Takaku	March 24, 1974
70	"The Invincible Commander, Kōji Kabuto!"; Transliteration: "Fujimi no shikikan Kabuto Kōji!!" (Japanese: 不死身の指揮官 兜甲児！！)	Katsuhisa Yamada	Keisuke Fujikawa	March 31, 1974
71	"The New Pilder's Charge into Danger!"; Transliteration: "Kiki toppa! Shin Pairudā GO!!" (Japanese: 危機突破！！新パイルダーGO！！)	Kōichi Sasaki	Keisuke Fujikawa	April 7, 1974
72	"The Giant Pinwheel Rocket Punch Finisher!"; Transliteration: "Hissatsu!! Daisharin roketto panchi" (Japanese: 必殺！！大車輪ロケットパンチ)	Tsunekiyo Ōtani	Keisuke Fujikawa	April 14, 1974
73	"Mazinger Z, Kidnapped!"; Transliteration: "Yūkai sareta Majingā Z!" (Japanese: 誘拐されたマジンガーZ)	Yasuo Yamayoshi	Susumu Takaku	April 21, 1974
74	"The Heroic Death of Aphrodite A!"; Transliteration: "Sōretsu!! Afurodai A no saigo!!" (Japanese: 壮烈！！アフロダイAの最後！！)	Masayuki Akehi	Keisuke Fujikawa	April 28, 1974
75	"The Suicidal Attack of Gorgon's Beast!"; Transliteration: "Kesshi no kōgeki! Gōgon kikaijū" (Japanese: 決死の攻撃！ゴーゴン機械獣)	Yoshikatsu Kasai	Keisuke Fujikawa	May 5, 1974
76	"Diana A, Lover of the Century!"; Transliteration: "Seiki no koibito Daianan A!" (Japanese: 世紀の恋人 ダイアナンA！)	Katsuhisa Yamada	Susumu Takaku	May 12, 1974
77	"The Undead Officer, Count Brocken"; Transliteration: "Hinshi no sanbō Burokken hakushaku" (Japanese: 瀕死の参謀 ブロッケン伯爵)	Nobutaka Nishizawa	Keisuke Fujikawa	May 19, 1974
78	"Baron Ashura Dies Nobly in the Pacific Ocean!"; Transliteration: "Ashura danshaku taiheiyō ni chiru!!" (Japanese: あしゅら男爵 太平洋に散る！！)	Kōichi Sasaki	Keisuke Fujikawa	May 26, 1974
79	"1 Second Until Mazinger Z Explodes!"; Transliteration: "Majingā bakuhatsu 1 byō mae!!" (Japanese: マジンガー 爆発1秒前！！)	Takeshi Shirato	Hiroyasu Yamaura	June 2, 1974
80	"The Bardos Island Trap!"; Transliteration: "Bādosu-tō no wana ni kakare!!" (Japanese: バードス島の罠にかゝれ！！)	Yasuo Yamayoshi	Keisuke Fujikawa	June 9, 1974
81	"Rest in Hell, Kōji Kabuto!"; Transliteration: "Jigoku de nemure!! Kabuto Kōji!!" (Japanese: 地獄で眠れ！！兜甲児！！)	Masayuki Akehi	Keisuke Fujikawa	June 16, 1974
82	"Mazinger Z in the Hands of Devils"; Transliteration: "Akuma no te ni watatta Majingā Z" (Japanese: 悪魔の手に渡ったマジンガーZ)	Katsuhisa Yamada	Keisuke Fujikawa	June 23, 1974
83	"The Spirit Officer, Viscount Pygman's Debut!"; Transliteration: "Hatsu kenzan!! Yōkai sanbō Piguman shishaku!!" (Japanese: 初見参！！妖怪参謀ピグマン子爵！！)	Tsunekiyo Ōtani	Keisuke Fujikawa	June 30, 1974
84	"The Ocean's Depths Are Mazinger Z's Grave!"; Transliteration: "Shinkai wa Majingā Z no hakaba da!!" (Japanese: 深海はマジンガーZの墓場だ！！)	Kōichi Sasaki	Keisuke Fujikawa	July 7, 1974
85	"Attack of the Bizarre Black Shadow!"; Transliteration: "Kaiki!! Kuroi kage no shūgeki!!" (Japanese: 怪奇！！黒い影の襲撃！！)	Yasuo Yamayoshi	Keisuke Fujikawa	July 14, 1974
86	"All-Out Attack! The Deadly Triple Plan!"; Transliteration: "Sōkōgeki! Shi no toripuru daisakusen" (Japanese: 総攻撃！死のトリプル大作戦)	Takeshi Tamiya	Hiroyasu Yamaura	July 21, 1974
87	"Death by Bomb! The Terrifying Viscount Pygman!"; Transliteration: "Bakushi!! Kyōfu no Piguman shishaku!!" (Japanese: 爆死！！恐怖のピグマン子爵！！)	Katsuhisa Yamada	Keisuke Fujikawa	July 28, 1974
88	"Life or Death?! The Desperate Battle on Hell Island!"; Transliteration: "Sei ka shi ka?! Jigoku-tō hisshi no kōbōsen!!" (Japanese: 生か死か？！地獄島必死の攻防戦！！)	Masayuki Akehi	Keisuke Fujikawa	August 4, 1974
89	"Time's Up! 4000 Meters Below Ground!!"; Transliteration: "Mattanashi!! Kyōi no chitei 4,000M!!" (Japanese: 待ったなし！！驚異の地底4,000M！！)	Tsunekiyo Ōtani	Keisuke Fujikawa	August 11, 1974
90	"Rage, Shirō! Shoot Down Your Mother's Memory!"; Transliteration: "Ikare Shirō!! Haha no omokage o ute!!" (Japanese: 怒れシロー！！母の面影を撃て！！)	Takeshi Tamiya	Keisuke Fujikawa	August 18, 1974
91	"Last Chance! Death Match with Dr. Hell!"; Transliteration: "Rasuto chansu!! Dr. Heru shi no kessen!!" (Japanese: ラスト・チャンス！！Dr・ヘル死の決戦！！)	Yoshikatsu Kasai	Keisuke Fujikawa	August 25, 1974
92	"Death Match! Resurrect Our Mazinger Z!"; Transliteration: "Desu macchi! Yomigaere warera no Majingā Z!!" (Japanese: デスマッチ！！甦れ我等のマジンガーZ！！)	Masayuki Akehi	Keisuke Fujikawa	September 1, 1974
