= List of Devilman episodes =

The Devilman Roman Album

Devilman is a Japanese anime series based on the manga of the same name written and illustrated by Go Nagai. It is directed by Masayuki Akehi and Tomoharu Katsumata with series composition by Masaki Tsuji, and music composed by Goh Misawa. It aired from July 8, 1972, to April 8, 1973, on NET (now TV Asahi). The opening theme is "Devilman no Uta" (デビルマンの歌; lit. 'Devilman's Song') and the ending theme is "Kyou mo Dokoka de Devilman" (今日も何処かでデビルマン) both performed by Keizo Toda.

== Episode list ==
No.	Title	Original release date	Ratings
1	"Resurrection of The Demon Tribe"; Transliteration: "Akuma Zoku Fukkatsu" (Japanese: 悪魔族復活)	July 8, 1972	6.6%
Demon Lord Xenon's greatest warrior, Devilman, possesses the body of a human boy in the Himalayas. After taking on Akira Fudo's identity, he returns to Japan to reshape the world for the Demon Tribe. However, as time passes he forgets his original mission...
2	"Demon Sirene"; Transliteration: "Yōjū Shirēnu" (Japanese: 妖獣シレーヌ)	July 15, 1972	7.8%
Sirene is sent to the human world by Xenon and is enraged when she discovers that Devilman has fallen in love with a human girl.
3	"Demon Gelge"; Transliteration: "Yōjū Geruge" (Japanese: 妖獣ゲルゲ)	July 29, 1972	8.0%
Xenon dispatches Gelge to kill Devilman. Miki is frustrated by Akira's actions.
4	"Demon General Zannin"; Transliteration: "Mashōgun Zannin" (Japanese: 魔将軍ザンニン)	August 5, 1972	8.6%
Demon General Zannin is selected to take over Devilman's original mission. Demon Vetra creates chaos in the human world.
5	"The Sleeping Beauty Zoldova"; Transliteration: "Nemureru Bijo Zorudoba" (Japanese: 眠れる美女ゾルドバ)	August 12, 1972	9.6%
A new student, Iwao Himura, arrives at Nakado Academy and challenges Akira. A coffin containing Lita, an exiled member of the Demon Tribe, is discovered by Akira and Miki.
6	"The Head of Rokfel"; Transliteration: "Rokuferu no Kubi" (Japanese: ロクフェルの首)	August 19, 1972	7.3%
Miki's father works to reconstruct the face of the skull of a young woman who died 200 years ago. Rokfel animates the skull and begins to wreak havoc in the city to lure out Devilman.
7	"The Terrifying Puppeteer Zool"; Transliteration: "Kyōfu no Ningyō Dukai Zūru" (Japanese: 恐怖の人形使いズール)	August 26, 1972	10.0%
Zool has the power to create clay dolls that control people. His next target is Miki...
8	"Iyamon and Bauu"; Transliteration: "Iyamon to Baū" (Japanese: イヤモンとバウウ)	September 2, 1972	10.4%
Demon Iyamon disguises herself as a student in order to kill Miki. When her cover is blown by Devilman, her brother Bauu comes to her rescue.
9	"Brainwave Demon Gondroma"; Transliteration: "Nōha Yōjū Gondorōma" (Japanese: 脳波妖獣ゴンドローマ)	September 9, 1972	11.5%
Brainwave Demon Gondroma uses his powers to control animals and spread chaos in the human world. Himura moves in on Miki.
10	"Demon Gandye, The Walking Eye"; Transliteration: "Yōjū Gandē, Me Ga Aruku" (Japanese: 妖獣ガンデエ眼が歩く)	September 16, 1972	11.5%
Devilman faces off against the Gan Triplets, a trio of demons who all demonstrate a variety of abilities related to their eyes.
11	"The Bewitching Scarlet Flower, Lafleur"; Transliteration: "Shinku no Yōka, Rafurēru" (Japanese: 真紅の妖花ラフレール)	September 23, 1972	13.4%
While pursuing Demon Lafleur, Devilman accidentally injures Miki's father. Akira and Miki get into a huge argument.
12	"The Fiery Beast Firam"; Transliteration: "Kaen Yōjū Faiamu" (Japanese: 火炎妖獣ファイアム)	September 30, 1972	14.0%
Firam is sent alongside a monstrous demon named Aguilar to fight Devilman. Zannin finally makes his move.
13	"The Proud Mermaim"; Transliteration: "Hokori Takaki Māmeimu" (Japanese: 誇り高きマーメイム)	October 7, 1972	14.0%
Xenon dispatches Demon Mermaim to assist Zannin in his fight against Devilman.
14	"Challenge at the Realm of Ice"; Transliteration: "Kōri no Kuni e no Chōsen" (Japanese: 氷の国への挑戦)	October 14, 1972	11.9%
Miki is rushed to the hospital after an altercation with Zannin. Akira heads off to the Himalayas to wipe out the Demon Tribe once and for all.
15	"Demon Beast Evine, Thousands of Arms"; Transliteration: "Yōjū Ebain, Senbon no Ude" (Japanese: 妖獣エバイン千本の腕)	October 21, 1972	13.5%
Evine uses mirrors to control people's arms. Demon General Muzan takes over from Zannin.
16	"Dwelling in Darkness, Demon Jenny"; Transliteration: "Yami Ni Sumu, Yōjū Jienī" (Japanese: 闇に棲む妖獣ジェニー)	October 28, 1972	14.3%
All of the children in town see a glowing red star during a meteor shower. It's actually a mind-control trick by Psycho Jenny.
17	"Stamp Demon Dagon"; Transliteration: "Kitte Yōjū Dagon" (Japanese: 切手妖獣ダゴン)	November 4, 1972	13.5%
A mysterious storyteller gives out stamps with monster designs. At night, the stamps come to life.
18	"The Silver Mayako"; Transliteration: "Giniro no Mayako" (Japanese: 銀色の魔矢子)	November 11, 1972	12.2%
A beautiful young woman named Mayako starts working at Cafe Chaco. Her alluring beauty drives the boys in town to fight each other.
19	"Demon Adal, The Puppet Scheme"; Transliteration: "Yōjū Adaru, Ningyō Sakusen" (Japanese: 妖獣アダル 人形作戦)	November 18, 1972	11.5%
Tare comes across a dumping ground with tons of mannequins. At night, he sees a mannequin in his room and attacks it with a hammer. The mannequin turns out to be Miki, who was killed by his attack. Distressed, Tare runs away from home.
20	"Farewell, Demon Drango"; Transliteration: "Saraba, Yōjū Dorango" (Japanese: さらば妖獣ドランゴ)	November 25, 1972	13.1%
A new transfer student named Tomita arrives at Nakado Academy and takes a liking to Miki. Meanwhile, Chaco has been mysteriously turned into an ice sculpture.
21	"Demon Doro Loves Humans"; Transliteration: "Yōjū Dorō wa Ningen ga Suki" (Japanese: 妖獣ドローは人間が好き)	December 2, 1972	14.6%
Demon Doro has a bottomless appetite and sets his eyes on Nakado Academy. Devilman wonders how he can defeat a practically invincible opponent.
22	"Demon Mughal, The Illusionist"; Transliteration: "Yōjū Mugāru, Genei no Majutsushi" (Japanese: 妖獣ムガール 幻影の魔術師)	December 9, 1972	14.0%
Principal Pochi and Alphonne see Akira push Miki into the river. Akira is set on proving his innocence, and finding Miki.
23	"Demon Bera, The Mystery of Tibet"; Transliteration: "Yōjū Bera, Chibetto no kai" (Japanese: 妖獣ベラ チベットの怪)	December 16, 1972	13.3%
Tare has a fight with Miyo and ends up stowing away on his father's flight to Tibet. Meanwhile, Demon General Muzan enlists Bera to expand the Demon Tribe's territory.
24	"Demon Giacon, The Living Specter"; Transliteration: "Yōjū Jakon, Iki Teiru Yūrei" (Japanese: 妖獣ジャコン 生きている幽霊)	December 23, 1972	14.0%
Demon Giacon uses his powers to possess Akira's classmate, Todaiji.
25	"Evil General Muzan, The Great School Assault"; Transliteration: "Yōshōgun Muzan, Gakuen Dai Shūgeki" (Japanese: 妖将軍ムザン 学園大襲撃)	December 30, 1972	12.7%
Muzan kidnaps the students of Nakado Academy in a last ditch effort to defeat Devilman.
26	"Demon of the Snow, Lala"; Transliteration: "Hakugin no Yōjū, Rara" (Japanese: 白銀の妖獣ララ)	January 6, 1973	11.6%
Akira is captured by Demons Dodo and Demon Lala during a ski trip.
27	"Demon Jewel, Limitless Desires"; Transliteration: "Yōjū Jueru, Hate Naki Yokubō" (Japanese: 妖獣ジュエル 果てなき欲望)	January 13, 1973	15.5%
Demon Lord Xenon places Demon Marshall Lacock in charge of operations. Meanwhile, Lala attempts to escape the psychiatric hospital.
28	"Demon Miniyon, The Devil's Pendant"; Transliteration: "Yōjū Miniyon, Akuma no Pendanto" (Japanese: 妖獣ミニヨン 悪魔のペンダント)	January 20, 1973	12.0%
Lacock sends out Miniyon to wreak havoc in the human world. Lala attempts to seduce Akira, much to his annoyance.
29	"Demon Kenetos, The Mysterious Necklace"; Transliteration: "Yōjū Kenetosu, Nazo no Nekkuresu" (Japanese: 妖獣ケネトス 謎のネックレス)	January 27, 1973	12.6%
Demon Kenetos creates a set of cursed necklaces to torture and kill humans. Alphonne falls victim to Kenetos's evil plan.
30	"Demon Phizele, The Insane Shadow"; Transliteration: "Yōjū Faizeru, Kage Ni Kurū" (Japanese: 妖獣ファイゼル 影に狂う)	February 3, 1973	12.0%
Demon Phizele has the ability to turn any human aggressive and violent. Miki, Lala, Tare, and Miyo have to fend off all the crazed humans while Devilman tries to find Phizele.
31	"Demon Kilskey, The Crimson Tornado"; Transliteration: "Yōjū Kirusukii, Shinku no Senpū" (Japanese: 妖獣キルスキイ 真紅の旋風)	February 10, 1973	13.4%
Demon Kilskey is ordered by Lacock to execute Lala.
32	"Demon Aurora, The Sparkling Prison"; Transliteration: "Yōjū Ōrora, Kagayaku Rōugōku" (Japanese: 妖獣オーロラ 輝く牢獄)	February 17, 1973	11.5%
Demon Marshall Lacock orders Lala's best friend, Aurora, to kill her.
33	"Demon Weathers, The Sun's Revolt"; Transliteration: "Yōjū Uezāsu, Taiyō no Hanran" (Japanese: 妖獣ウエザース 太陽の反乱)	February 24, 1973	10.5%
Demon Weathers uses his powers of weather control to battle Devilman. Tare and Miyo attempt to save a dog named Hachi.
34	"Demon Alron, The Terrifying Maxi Dress"; Transliteration: "Yōjū Aruron, Kyōfu no Makishi" (Japanese: 妖獣アルロン 恐怖のマキシ)	March 3, 1973	11.2%
Upset at the pain Devilman has caused the Demon Marshall, Alron travels to Japan to kill him. Meanwhile, Lala is frustrated with her own stupidity and tries to find a way to cure it.
35	"Demon Marshal Lacock, The Frozen School"; Transliteration: "Yōgensui Reikokku, Kōre Ru Gakuen" (Japanese: 妖元帥レイコック 凍れる学園)	March 10, 1973	10.6%
Mourning the loss of Alron, Demon Marshall Lacock disobeys Xenon's orders, and challenges Devilman.
36	"Demon Magdler, The Flying Lava"; Transliteration: "Yōjū Magudorā, Sora Tobu Yōgan" (Japanese: 妖獣マグドラー 空とぶ溶岩)	March 17, 1973	11.2%
Demon Magdler is ordered by Demon Lord Xenon to kill the traitors, starting with Lala. How can Devilman defeat an enemy who is powered by the Earth's core?
37	"Demon Wooddow, The Enraged Greenery"; Transliteration: "Yōjū Uddodō, Okoreru Midori" (Japanese: 妖獣ウッドドウ 怒れる緑)	March 24, 1973	9.5%
Demon Wooddow controls trees to attack humanity. Tare sees Akira transform into Devilman.
38	"Demon Dremoon, The Moon is Hell"; Transliteration: "Yōjū Dorimūn, Tsuki wa Jigoku Da" (Japanese: 妖獣ドリムーン 月は地獄だ)	March 31, 1973	10.0%
Dremon uses his powers to pull the Earth closer to the Moon. If Devilman can't stop him in time, it will mean the end of the world.
39	"Demon God, The Miracles of God"; Transliteration: "Yōjū Goddo, Kami no Kiseki" (Japanese: 妖獣ゴッド 神の奇蹟)	April 7, 1973	N/A
A series of unexplained events have been occurring all over the world. Akira realizes the only person who has such power is Xenon's Captain of Guard; Demon God. God warns Akira not to interfere, otherwise he will reveal his identity to Miki.
