= Twelve Months (1980 film) =

- Theatrical poster
- Directed by: Kimio Yabuki
- Written by: Kimio Yabuki; Tomoe Takashi
- Based on: The Twelve Months by Samuil Marshak
- Produced by: Kenji Yokoyama
- Cinematography: Masao Shimizu; Tamio Hosoda
- Edited by: Kōichi Katagiri; Yutaka Chikura
- Music by: Vladimir Ivanovich Krivtsov
- Production companies: Toei Animation; Soyuzmultfilm
- Distributed by: Toei Company
- Release date: March 15, 1980 (Japan)
- Running time: 65 minutes
- Countries: Japan; Soviet Union
- Language: Japanese / Russian / English

Twelve Months (世界名作童話 森は生きている, Sekai Meisaku Dōwa: Mori wa Ikiteiru; lit. 'World Masterpiece Fairy Tales: The Forest That Lives'; Russian: Двенадцать месяцев, romanized: Dvenadcať mesjacev) is a 1980 animated feature film directed by Kimio Yabuki and produced by Toei Animation from Japan in partnership with Soyuzmultfilm from the Soviet Union. It was based on the 1943 play written by Samuil Marshak which itself was based on the medieval fairy tale of the same name. The music was composed by Vladimir Ivanovich Krivtsov and performed by the National Leningrad Philharmonic under the direction of A. S. Dmitriev.

Preceded by The Wild Swans (1977) and Thumbelina (1978), and followed by Swan Lake (1981) and Aladdin and the Wonderful Lamp (1982), it represents the third episode in Toei's World Masterpiece Fairy Tales film series.

== Plot synopsis ==
A spoiled, young queen asks for the impossible during a cold winter and requests for a bouquet of Galanthus, a spring wildflower, for New Year's Day in exchange for a reward of gold. One greedy woman desires to collect the bounty and instead of sending her own daughter, readily sends her young stepdaughter, Anja, to look for the white-blossomed flowers in the deep forest during a night snowstorm despite knowing the task will be impossible. Despite refusing, Anja is cast into the blizzard by her stepmother and in the barren forest, falls unconscious from the freezing cold. Later, she is awoken and is drawn to a light in the distance from a mysterious bonfire, surrounded by spirits who reveal themselves as the Twelve Months. Learning of her task, the twelve spirits take pity on Anja. They use their powers to temporarily bring spring to allow the flowers to grow and be collected but request that no one is to know how and where she obtained the Galanthus. A grateful Anja returns home with the requested flowers and the bouquet is presented to the queen by her stepmother and stepsister, but the dissatisfied queen wishes to see where the flowers grow for herself. The stepsister and stepmother secretly follow Anja into the forest and lead the queen there as well. The Twelve Months come to save Anja from the others and turn her stepsister and stepmother into dogs. Anja drives away in a sledge together with the queen, with whom she becomes friends.

== Cast ==
Character	Original	English
Anja	Shinobu Otake	Corinne Orr
Queen	Ai Kanzaki	Paula Parker
Stepmother	Tokuko Sugiyama	Joan Shepard
Stepsister	Mariko Mukai	Jenn Thompson
Professor	Ichirō Nagai	Unknown
Prime Minister	Masashi Amenomori	Unknown
Officer	Daisuke Ryu	Unknown
January	Kiyoshi Kobayashi	Unknown
April	Katsuji Mori	Unknown
Soldier	Masato Yamanouchi	Earl Hammond
Young soldier	Koji Yakusho	Unknown

=== Additional voices ===
- Original: Hidekatsu Shibata
- English: Ray Owens, Peter Fernandez, and John Belucci

== Release ==
The film had its premiere on March 15, 1980.

== Music ==
Opening theme

- "I Won't Cry" (泣かないわ, Nakanai wa)

Sung by Mari Yoshiko with The Glinka Choir, lyrics by Kimio Yabuki, music and arrangement by Vladimir Krivstov, performed by National Leningrad Philharmonic.

Ending theme

- "The Forest That Lives" (森は生きている, Mori wa ikiteiru)

Sung by Mari Yoshiko with The Glinka Choir, lyrics by Kimio Yabuki, music and arrangement by Vladimir Krivstov, performed by National Leningrad Philharmonic.

== See also ==
- List of animated feature films of 1980
