= World Famous Fairy Tale Series =

Japanese anime series of shorts

- 8 mm film cover for Thumbelina

世界名作童話 まんがシリーズ (Sekai meisaku dōwa manga shirīzu)
- Genre: Adventure, fantasy, romance
- Anime film series
- Directed by: see list: Tomoharu Katsumata (1); Masamune Ochiai (2); Masayuki Akehi (3); Hiroshi Shidara (4); Yasuo Yamaguchi (5); Osamu Kasai (6, 10); Yoshikatsu Kasai (7); Tsunekiyo Otani (8); Kazukiyo Shigeno (9); Kazumi Fukushima (11); Akinori Orai (12–13); Tokiji Kaburaki (14); Yūgo Serikawa (15); Atsutoshi Umezawa (16); Tadao Okubo (17); Jun'ichi Sato (18); Yukio Kaizawa (19); Hiroyuki Ebata (20)
- Produced by: Yoshihiro Seki
- Written by: see list: Masaki Tsuji (1, 3–4, 6–10); Tadaaki Yamazaki (2, 5); Tomomi Tsutsui (11, 13–15); Junta Fujiwara (12); Michiru Shimada (16–20)
- Music by: Shigeru Miyashita
- Studio: Toei Animation
- Licensed by: Toei Company; Fujifilm
- Released: October 1975 – February 1983
- Runtime: 10–15 minutes (each)
- Films: 20

World Famous Fairy Tale Series (世界名作童話 まんがシリーズ, Sekai Meisaku Dōwa Manga Shirīzu; lit. 'World Masterpiece Fairy Tale Manga Series'), also known as Classic Tales Retold, Fairy Tale Classics, Children's Classics or The World's Greatest Fairy Tales, is a Japanese anime series of short films based on fairy tales and classic stories, produced by Toei Animation between 1975 and 1983.

== Premise ==
The series consists of 20 short films, on which many different artists worked over the years, such as Grendizer's directors Masayuki Akehi and Tomoharu Katsumata. Each short runs 10 minutes and is based on a popular fairy tale or a literature classic as in the case of The Wizard of Oz. All of the narration is provided by Kyōko Kishida while Naoko Watanabe sings the opening song.

The films were released in Japan by Toei Company and Fujifilm on Single-8 in three blocks: 10 films in October 1975, 5 in February 1979 and other 5 in February 1983.

The shorts later aired on TX Network in April 1988, and in 1991 the series was also released on VHS and Betamax by Toei Video, sometimes under the alternative titles Sekai Meisaku Dōwa-kan (世界名作童話館; lit. "World Masterpiece Children's Fairy Tale Hall") or Anime Meisaku Dōwa (アニメ名作童話; lit. "Anime Masterpiece Fairy Tale").

Some of the stories would be later adapted by Toei in its feature length fairy tale film series Sekai Meisaku Dōwa and in the TV anime series World Fairy Tale Series.

In the United States, the first 10 shorts aired in 1977 on CBS and in syndication in a version produced by Fred Ladd titled Classic Tales Retold. This version was later released on VHS in 1986 by Hi-Tops Video and on DVD in 2005 as The World's Greatest Fairy Tales. In 1983, Harmony Gold dubbed the second block of five shorts, that were released on VHS in the Children's Video Library series under the title Fairy Tale Classics (Children's Classics on the title card). In 1986, four shorts from the third block were adapted by Saban Entertainment in its version of Studio Unicorn's My Favorite Fairy Tales (leaving The Red Riding Hood unpublished) and released on VHS by Hi-Tops Video.

The series was also released in France (Contes Japonais), Italy (Le più famose favole del mondo) and other countries.

== Cast ==
- Kyōko Kishida: Narrator
- Isao Hashizume: Miscellaneous (15–20)

== Short films ==
| No. | Title | Directed by | Written by | Original release date |
|---|---|---|---|---|
| 1 | "Hansel and Gretel"; Transliteration: "Henzeru to Gureteru" (Japanese: ヘンゼルとグレーテル) | Tomoharu Katsumata | Masaki Tsuji | October 1975 |
| 2 | "Thumbelina" / "Princess Thumb"; Transliteration: "Oyayubi hime" (Japanese: おやゆび姫) | Masamune Ochiai | Tadaaki Yamazaki | October 1975 |
| 3 | "Jack and the Beanstalk"; Transliteration: "Jakku to mame no ki" (Japanese: ジャックと豆の木) | Masayuki Akehi | Masaki Tsuji | October 1975 |
| 4 | "The North Wind and the Sun"; Transliteration: "Kitakaze to taiyō" (Japanese: 北風と太陽) | Hiroshi Shidara | Masaki Tsuji | October 1975 |
| 5 | "Aladdin and His Wonderful Lamp" / "Aladdin and the Wonderful Lamp"; Transliteration: "Arajin to fushigina ranpu" (Japanese: アラジンとふしぎなランプ) | Yasuo Yamaguchi | Tadaaki Yamazaki | October 1975 |
| 6 | "The Emperor's New Clothes" / "Emperor's New Clothes"; Transliteration: "Hadaka no ōsama" (Japanese: はだかの王様) | Osamu Kasai | Masaki Tsuji | October 1975 |
| 7 | "The Wolf and the Seven Kids" / "The Wolf and the Seven Little Kids"; Transliteration: "Nana hiki no koyagi" (Japanese: 七ひきの子やぎ) | Yoshikatsu Kasai | Masaki Tsuji | October 1975 |
| 8 | "The Wild Swans"; Transliteration: "Hakuchō no ōji" (Japanese: 白鳥の王子) | Tsunekiyo Otani | Masaki Tsuji | October 1975 |
| 9 | "The Ears of King Midas" / "King Midas"; Transliteration: "Ōsama no mimi wa roba no mimi" (Japanese: 王様の耳はロバの耳) | Kazukiyo Shigeno | Masaki Tsuji | October 1975 |
| 10 | "The Little Match Girl"; Transliteration: "Macchi uri no shōjo" (Japanese: マッチ売りの少女) | Osamu Kasai | Masaki Tsuji | October 1975 |
| 11 | "Ali Baba and the 40 Thieves"; Transliteration: "Ari Baba to 40-nin no tōzoku" (Japanese: アリババと40人の盗賊) | Kazumi Fukushima | Tomomi Tsutsui | February 1979 |
| 12 | "The Ugly Duckling"; Transliteration: "Minikui ahiru no ko" (Japanese: みにくいあひるの子) | Akinori Orai | Junta Fujiwara | February 1979 |
| 13 | "Cinderella"; Transliteration: "Shinderera hime" (Japanese: シンデレラ姫) | Akinori Orai | Tomomi Tsutsui | February 1979 |
| 14 | "The Red Shoes"; Transliteration: "Akai kutsu" (Japanese: 赤い靴) | Tokiji Kaburaki | Tomomi Tsutsui | February 1979 |
| 15 | "The Bremen Town Musicians" / "The Musical Band of Blumen"; Transliteration: "Burēmen no ongaku tai" (Japanese: ブレーメンの音楽隊) | Yūgo Serikawa | Tomomi Tsutsui | February 1979 |
| 16 | "The Red Riding Hood"; Transliteration: "Akazukin-chan" (Japanese: 赤ずきんちゃん) | Atsutoshi Umezawa | Michiru Shimada | February 1983 |
| 17 | "The Cobbler and the Elves" / "The Dwarf and the Cobbler"; Transliteration: "Kobito to kutsuya" (Japanese: こびとと靴屋) | Tadao Okubo | Michiru Shimada | February 1983 |
| 18 | "Sleeping Beauty"; Transliteration: "Nemuri hime" (Japanese: ねむり姫) | Junichi Sato | Michiru Shimada | February 1983 |
| 19 | "The Wizard of Oz"; Transliteration: "Ozu no mahōtsukai" (Japanese: オズの魔法使い) | Yukio Kaizawa | Michiru Shimada | February 1983 |
| 20 | "The Magic Carpet" / "Magic Carpet"; Transliteration: "Mahō no jūtan" (Japanese: 魔法のじゅうたん) | Hiroyuki Ebata | Michiru Shimada | February 1983 |
