= Space Family Carlvinson =

Japanese manga series

- First tankōbon volume cover

宇宙家族カールビンソン (Uchū Kazoku Kārubinson)
- Genre: Science fiction comedy
- Manga
- Written by: Yoshitoh Asari
- Published by: Tokuma Shoten
- Imprint: Shōnen Captain Comics (1985–1997); Afternoon KC (1999–)
- Magazine: Monthly Shōnen Captain
- Original run: 1985 – 1996
- Volumes: 13
- Original video animation
- Directed by: Kimio Yabuki
- Produced by: Iku Ishiguro; Michio Yokoo; Yoshio Tsuboike
- Written by: Michiru Shimada
- Music by: Hiroya Watanabe
- Studio: Doga Kobo
- Released: December 21, 1988
- Runtime: 45 minutes
- Manga
- Written by: Yoshitoh Asari
- Published by: Kodansha
- Imprint: Afternoon KC
- Magazine: Monthly Afternoon
- Original run: April 24, 1999 – January 25, 2000
- Volumes: 1
- icon

Space Family Carlvinson (Japanese: 宇宙家族カールビンソン, Hepburn: Uchū Kazoku Kārubinson) is a Japanese manga series written and illustrated by Yoshitoh Asari. It was serialized in Tokuma Shoten's shōnen manga magazine Monthly Shōnen Captain between 1985 and 1996, with its chapters collected in 13 tankōbon volumes. A reboot was serialized in Kodansha's seinen manga magazine Monthly Afternoon from April 1999 to January 2000. Portions of the manga was adapted into a 45-minute original video animation directed by Kimio Yabuki which aired in December 1988.

An alien acting troupe accidentally orphaned a young human girl and take it upon themselves to raise her in the customs of her human family until her biological family arrives to bring her to her original home. The manga's title is a parody on Swiss Family Robinson, in addition to referencing the aircraft carrier USS Carl Vinson, which was stationed in Japan at the time of the manga's creation, which in turn was named after Georgia congressman Carl Vinson. It has received generally favorable reviews praising its emotional core and underlying themes, but critiquing its lack of substantiative development for its cast.

== Plot ==
In the year 4001, an interstellar acting troupe of six aliens are trying to fly to their next performance, as they are doing so, they accidentally crash into another spaceship over the planet Anika and lead to the death of a human couple. As the acting troupe explores the downed craft, they discover that their baby survived the crash, the police officer sent to record the crash refuses to look after the baby. Thus the alien acting troupe take it upon themselves to take care of the orphaned child as her new family, through the guidance of the ship's logs to raise her in a way that her biological parents would. The acting troupe expects to only take care of the baby for a few weeks, but five years have elapsed since then, and the acting troupe has settled down into life on the planet Anika as Corona's family and friends. The leader, Mother, and battle robot, Father, play the roles of the baby, Corona's, mother and father. The story starts off as Corona is about to enter kindergarten.

The OVA is a self contained story split into four sections, and adapted from the manga's material. Transitioning between spring, summer, autumn, and winter, it highlights on the deep bonds that the alien acting troupe has grown over the years and the genuine care they feel for Corona. When someone comes to pick up Corona, her adoptive mother struggles to decide between whether to do what is best for her child and her urge not to return her to her rightful family. It is eventually revealed that the craft sent to pick her up was not from her home planet, but an alien, Pona, who was looking for lost children to raise on her own. Corona rejects her, saying that she likes staying with her family, and waves goodbye to Pona. Corona's mother finds her, and they reunite, having thought that Corona would return with her people. At its end, she muses to herself that some day, she and her family will eventually have to give up Corona.

== Development ==
The title of the series is a parody on Swiss Family Robinson. The "Carlvinson" portion of the title likely refers to the USS Carl Vinson, which was active in the Sea of Japan between the 1980s and 1990s. It was often seen in Tokyo harbor during the time Asari had drawn the manga. In turn, the aircraft carrier is named after U.S. congressman from Georgia Carl Vinson, however it is unlikely that Asari was paying homage to the congressman, who was an active supporter of the US Navy during the Second World War, and rather simply having the name be a play on the similar sounding title.

Asari, a fan of the science fiction genre, inserted in-group references to contemporary films and other related forms of media. There exists speculation that Space Family Carlvinson is a reference to the series Lost in Space, which was previously Space Family Robinson. Additionally, there are references to other science fiction films such as John Carpenter's The Thing.

According to historian Fred Patten, around the time of the animated OVA's release, the Cartoon/Fantasy Organization was undergoing a breakup, and thus the ensuing internal conflict resulted in a failure for the OVA to be brought to a wider audience in the United States.

== Characters ==
=== Acting troupe/Saucer family ===
Corona (コロナ, Korona)
Voiced by: Mayumi Shō

A human child whose parents died when they crashed into the acting troupe's spaceship. Rescued as a baby, as her parents protected her as their spaceship crashed and died doing so, the story skips ahead to when she is 5 years old. The acting troupe takes it upon themselves to raise and care for her as if they were her parents, waiting for someone of her own species to take care of her to arrive. Naturally inquisitive and naive, she cares a lot for her family.

Mother (おかあさん, Okaa-san)
Voiced by: Toshiko Fujita

A fluffy mouse like alien. She is the leader of the travelling acting troupe, and decides that they should raise the orphaned child. She takes up the role as Corona's mother. She serves as the voice of reason within the group.

Father (おとうさん, Otou-san)
Voiced by: Tesshō Genda

A robotic alien that consists of a detachable head and an interchangeable suit which hovers above the ground. He takes up the role as Corona's father. While stoic, he is also absentminded and easily hurt by Corona's frustrations. He has a mysterious past, and does not share it with the other members of his troupe, but was said to be a former soldier.

Belka (ベルカ, Beruka)
Voiced by: Yuko Mizutani

A humanoid alien resembling an elf with animalistic features. She is extremely strong, and can shift into another form to perform feats of strength. Belka formerly worked as a mercenary and was rivals with Laika. Belka is extremely weak against heat, due to her home planet being cold and icy. She takes up the role of the sheriff of Anika.

Tah-Kun (ターくん, Tā-kun)
Voiced by: Akira Kamiya

An alien resembling a human's nervous system complete with a brain, which serves as his head. He is the heir to a great fortune, but ran away from home to join the acting troupe. When a butler is sent to retrieve him, he refuses, saying that he enjoyed his life in Anika. Tah-kun plays the role as Corona's pet squirrel, and as a result, often suffers from Corona's crude methods of having fun.

Andy (アンディ, Andi)
Voiced by: Yuji Mitsuya

An alien consisting of a single eye encased in a capsule with two robotic legs attached. He works as the owner of the general store on Anika, and is a shrewd businessman.

Parker (パーカー, Pãkã)

An alien consisting of a huge oval shaped head and a singular eye with thin limbs. She is constantly with her arms raised in front of her, and does not speak at all. She is the love interest of the Anika native Jun. Her role within the acting troupe and in Anika is unknown.

=== Anika townspeople ===
Anika Natives (原住生物 (げんじゅうせいぶつ), Genjuu Seibutsu)
Voiced by: Manabu Mitsuzuka, Shigeru Nakahara, and Tsutomu Kashiwakura

Black, squid like aliens, with two arms and four legs with yellow teardrop-shaped faces. They evolved from nautili and live in the mountains, but are unable to swim. They bear characters resembling kanji on their forehead that serve to differentiate between each of them, and all are modelled after film directors. They serve mostly as Corona's preschool classmates. Several are named, but 3 often show up: Jun (ジュン) (Nakahara), Kō (コー) (Mitsuzuka), and Jissō (ジッソー) (Kashiwakura). Jun, modelled after Junkichi Oki, a film director, is a hopeless romantic and has a crush on Parker. Ko enjoys fishing, and is modelled after Koichi Kawakita. Jisso, who has the habit of placing objects to obscure parts of his face, and is modelled after Akio Jissoji.

Ken (ケン, Ken)
Voiced by: Norio Wakamoto

A reptilian alien who is able to fly. He is a wandering nomad who is sometimes involved with the antics of the locals.

Laika (ライカ, Raika)

Belka's rival from her past as a mercenary, she is a green-haired alien with an irritable personality. Out to defeat Belka, she constantly fails, and lives with the Shovel Mouse. Laika holds immense power due to her heritage, and has wings and a tail.

John Carpenter (ジョン = カーペンター, Jon Kāpentā)

A dog-like alien with the uncanny ability to disembowel himself and detach his head. He is a movie buff in addition to being a film director, and works as the town's theatre owner.

Grandma (ばーさん, Bā-san)

An elderly alien who consists of a single eye and cannot talk. She runs the local candy store.

Ms. Midori (ミドリ先生, Midori-sensei)
Voiced by: Yoshino Takamori

A mysterious humanoid woman alien with long dark hair who shows up for the purpose of becoming the town's kindergarten teacher. Her role in town is to run Anika's kindergarten as Corona's teacher. She is the candy store owner's niece.

Taro (鯉の太郎, Koi no Tarou)

A koi fish-like alien who, in the spirit of Japanese folktales, became a dragon upon jumping over a waterfall. He inhabits the local swamp in Anika, and is able to transform into any form he wishes to, but is unable to transform into his idealized form if he is critiqued.

Shovel Mouse (ショベル = マウス, Shoberu Mausu)

An alien that resembles a mouse which constantly holds a shovel. He provides housing for Laika and enjoys to dig holes.

== Media ==
=== Manga ===
Written and illustrated by Yoshitoh Asari, Space Family Carlvinson was first serialized in Tokuma Shoten's shōnen manga magazine Monthly Shōnen Captain between 1985 and 1996. Tokuma Shoten collected its chapters in 13 tankōbon volumes, released from April 1986 to July 1997. The series was later re-edited by Asari and republished by Kodansha in 11 tankōbon volumes, released from July 22, 1999, to May 24, 2000, and in a six-volume bunkoban edition, released from November 11, 2005, to March 10, 2006.

A reboot of Space Family Carlvinson, also written and illustrated by Asari, was serialized on Kodansha's seinen manga magazine Monthly Afternoon from April 24, 1999, (Note: Debuted in the magazine's June 1999 issue titled "Lost in Universe" (ロスト・イン・ユニバース), released on April 24, 1999.) to January 25, 2000. (Note: Finished in the magazine's March 2000 issue, released on January 25, 2000.) Kodansha collected its chapters in one tankōbon volume, released on May 24, 2000.

==== Tokuma Shoten ====
No.	Release date	ISBN
1	April 20, 1986	4-19-836540-7
2	December 20, 1986	4-19-836620-9
3	October 1987	4-19-837600-X
4	October 1988	4-19-838600-5
5	July 1989	4-19-839070-3
6	August 1990	4-19-830080-1
7	March 20, 1991	4-19-831030-0
8	August 1992	4-19-832080-2
9	July 1993	4-19-833070-0
10	November 1994	4-19-830033-X
11	September 1995	4-19-830087-9
12	July 1996	4-19-830137-9
13	July 1997	4-19-830171-9

==== Kodansha Afternoon KC ====
No.	Release date	ISBN
1	May 24, 2000	978-4-06-321113-9

==== Kodansha Afternoon KC - SC Full Version ====
No.	Release date	ISBN
1	July 22, 1999	978-4-06-314215-0
2	July 22, 1999	978-4-06-314216-7
3	September 22, 1999	978-4-06-314220-4
4	September 22, 1999	978-4-06-314221-1
5	November 22, 1999	978-4-06-314224-2
6	November 22, 1999	978-4-06-314225-9
7	January 21, 2000	978-4-06-314231-0
8	January 21, 2000	978-4-06-314232-7
9	March 23, 2000	978-4-06-314236-5
10	March 23, 2000	978-4-06-314237-2
11	May 24, 2000	978-4-06-314243-3

==== Kodansha Manga Bunkoban ====
No.	Release date	ISBN
1	November 11, 2005	978-4-06-360981-3
2	November 11, 2005	978-4-06-360982-0
3	December 9, 2005	978-4-06-360991-2
4	January 12, 2006	978-4-06-360992-9
5	February 10, 2006	978-4-06-360993-6
6	March 10, 2006	978-4-06-360994-3

=== Original video animation ===
Portions of the manga were adapted into a single 45-minute original video animation (OVA) and animation done by Doga Kobo. The screenplay was done by Michiru Shimada and it was directed by Kimio Yabuki. Corona was voiced by Mayumi Shō, her mother was voiced by Toshiko Fujita and her father was voiced by Tesshō Genda. The OVA features the opening theme "Ichiban Suteki na Love Song" (いちばんステキなラブソング) and the ending theme "Spring Song" (すぷりんぐ・そんぐ) both by Miwako Saito.

== Reception ==
Historian Fred Patten writing in Cartoon Research thought that the OVA "had the potential to be so much more" and ended too abruptly, praising its humor and quiet charm due to its combination of sci-fi elements with more mundane everyday elements. Mike Toole writing for Anime News Network' described the OVA as "cute, simple, fun to watch" but also noted that it was "100% unmarketable to anyone who isn't either familiar with the comics or an adventuresome cartoon dork" and critiqued the OVA for having little substance. Jason Huff writing in The Anime Review described the style as simplistic but effective, and praised its emotional core and underlying themes. He critiqued its gentle comedy and short length leaving little to develop the secondary cast. Sean O'Mara writing for ZIMMERIT described Space Family Carlvinson as "charming if forgettable", stating that it "holds up better than it has any right to and [it is] easy to recommend".
