= Kimio Yabuki =

Japanese animator

- 矢吹 公郎
- Born: December 6, 1934 (age 91); Shirakawa, Fukushima Japan
- Occupation: Animator

Kimio Yabuki (矢吹 公郎, Yabuki Kimio; Born December 6, 1934) is a Japanese animator. Known in Japan for his work on many early classic works by the Toei Animation studio, his best-known film in the West is Rainbow Brite and the Star Stealer from 1985, produced by the French-American company DiC with animation work done in Japan.

In 1969, he teamed up with a young Hayao Miyazaki in the production of an animated version of Puss in Boots. Yabuki was an employee of Toei Animation until going freelance in 1973, but did work on several Toei productions (including Dororon Enma-kun, Ikkyu-san, and The Kabocha Wine) afterward.

== Filmography ==
=== Director ===
- 1963–1965: Ōkami Shōnen Ken (狼少年ケン, Wolf Boy Ken; TV series)
- 1968: The World of Hans Christian Andersen (アンデルセン物語, Andersen Monogatari)
- 1969: The Wonderful World of Puss 'n Boots (長靴をはいた猫, Nagagutsu o Haita Neko)
- 1973–1974: Dororon Enma-kun (ドロロンえん魔くん)
- 1975–1982: Ikkyū-san (一休さん)
- 1980: Twelve Months (世界名作童話 森は生きている, Sekai Meisaku Dōwa Mori wa Ikiteiru)
- 1981: Swan Lake
- 1982–1984: The Kabocha Wine (Theかぼちゃワイン)
- 1985: Rainbow Brite and the Star Stealer
- 1988: Space Family Carlvinson (宇宙家族カールビンソン, Uchū Kazoku Carlvinson)

=== Writer ===
- 1984: Twelve Months (film)
- 1989: The Jungle Book (TV series)

=== Assistant director ===
- 1963: The Little Prince and the Eight-Headed Dragon (わんぱく王子の大蛇退治, Wanpaku Ouji no Orochi Taiji)
