= The World of Hans Christian Andersen =

- American theatrical poster
- アンデルセン物語
- Directed by: Kimio Yabuki
- Written by: Hisashi Inoue; Morihisa Yamamoto
- Produced by: Ken Ariga; Masajirō Seki; Seiichi Moro
- Cinematography: Akio Hayashi; Kima Shirane
- Edited by: Yutaka Chikura
- Music by: Seichiro Uno
- Production company: Toei Animation
- Distributed by: Toei Company
- Release date: March 19, 1968
- Running time: 80 minutes
- Country: Japan
- Language: Japanese

The World of Hans Christian Andersen (アンデルセン物語, Anderusen Monogatari; lit. 'Andersen Stories'; also known as: アンデルセン物語 マッチ売りの少女 (Anderusen Monogatari: Matchi uri no shōjo; lit. 'Andersen Stories: The Little Match Girl')) is a 1968 Japanese animated fantasy film produced by Toei Animation, based on the works of Danish author Hans Christian Andersen. Theatrically released in Japan on March 19, 1968, the film was licensed in North America by United Artists in 1971.

== Synopsis ==
A young Hans Christian Andersen, while seeking an opera ticket, suddenly discovers the inspirations and talents he will later have for his fairy tales.

== Release ==
The World of Hans Christian Andersen was released by Toei Company on March 19, 1968, three years prior to Andersen Stories (Anderusen Monogatari, 1971), an eponymous and thematically similar series produced by Zuiyo Enterprise and Mushi Production. The film and the series also have in common composer Seiichirō Uno, screenwriters Hisashi Inoue and Morihisa Yamamoto, and voice actress Eiko Masuyama. The film was dubbed for U.S. audiences by Hal Roach, who hired Chuck McCann and Al Kilgore to assist him; this was one of his last efforts before his studio closed down.

In 1971, United Artists partnered with Hal Roach Studios to distribute this edit, which opened in theaters on March 1. Toei later adapted Andersen's works in feature length films such as Hans Christian Andersen's The Little Mermaid (1975), The Wild Swans (1977) and Thumbelina (1978), and in the TV series World Fairy Tale Series.

== Cast ==
| Character | Original | English |
|---|---|---|
| Uncle Oley | Tadao Takashima | Chuck McCann |
| Hans | Toshiko Fujita | Hetty Galen |
| Elisa | Kazuko Sugiyama | Corinne Orr |
| Kitty Kat | Katsue Miwa | Corinne Orr |
| Little Boy | Unknown | Corinne Orr |
| Match Girl | Unknown | Corinne Orr |
| Mice | Unknown | Corinne Orr |
| Mice | Unknown | Frances Russell |
| Mice | Unknown | Jim Yoham |
| Karen | Eiko Masuyama | Sidney Filson |
| Kaspar Kat | Yasushi Suzuki | Jim MacGeorge |
| Governor | Arihiro Fujimura | Jim MacGeorge |
| Hans's Father | Kōsei Tomita | Jim MacGeorge |
| Hannibal Mouse | Chiharu Kuri | Lionel Wilson |
| Mayor | Ryōichi Tamagawa | Lionel Wilson |
| Watchdog | Shinsuke Minami | Lionel Wilson |
| Grandmother | Unknown | Ruth Bailew |
| Ducks | Unknown | Earl Hammond |
| Theater Manager | Unknown | Earl Hammond |

== Reception ==
In his Family Guide to Movies on Video, Henry Herx wrote that "the animation is colorful and creative, though stylistically comparable to Saturday morning TV shows. It provides a wonderful world of fantasy to absorb the small fry at a matinee". The writers of Jerry Beck's Animated Movie Guide gave it three stars out of four; as contributor Fred Patten commented, the film "is pleasant children's fare; a stereotypical and clichéd 'fun for the whole family' animated feature".

== Home media ==
The World of Hans Christian Andersen was first released to VHS by RCA/Columbia Pictures Home Video in the 1980s. In 2004, Digiview Productions released it on DVD.
