= Al Kilgore =

American cartoonist (1927–1983)

- Born: Alfred R. Kilgore; December 19, 1927 Newark, New Jersey, U.S.
- Died: August 15, 1983 (aged 55) New York, New York, U.S.
- Area: Artist
- Awards: National Cartoonists Society – Special Features Award; 1983 Elvis the Paper Doll Book

Alfred R. Kilgore (December 19, 1927 - August 15, 1983), who signed his work Al Kilgore, was an American artist who worked as a cartoonist and filmmaker.

Born in Newark, New Jersey, Kilgore attended Andrew Jackson High School where he played basketball with a young Bob Cousy. He also met Dolores Preusch at this time, and the couple married in 1958. During World War II, he served in the Fifth Air Force. After the war, he entered into art studies, graduating from the Art Career School in 1951.

== Comic strips and comic books ==
He was an artist on the Bullwinkle comic strip for the Bell-McClure Syndicate between 1962 and 1967. In 1969, he did a syndicated puzzle feature, TV Star Screen.

== Films ==
He appeared as an actor in Louis McMahon's serial parody Captain Celluloid vs. the Film Pirates, along with fellow film historians and authors Alan G. Barbour and William K. Everson. This four-part, semi-professional production paid homage to Republic Pictures and its adventure serials, while kidding the vintage film subculture of the 1960s. The plot involved a masked villain named The Master Duper, one of three members of a Film Commission who attempted to steal the only known prints of priceless antique films, and the heroic Captain Celluloid, who wore a costume reminiscent of that of the Black Commando in the Columbia serial The Secret Code and was determined to uncover him.

Kilgore produced and scripted the American dub of the Japanese fantasy film The World of Hans Christian Andersen (1971) which he co-directed with Chuck McCann. The film was dubbed for American audiences by Hal Roach, who hired McCann and Kilgore to assist him. This was one of Roach's last efforts before his studio closed down.

== Sons of the Desert ==
He was a founding member of the Laurel and Hardy appreciation society, The Sons of the Desert, and drew the organization's crest. His caricatures of Laurel and Hardy were used in John McCabe's biography, Mr. Laurel and Mr. Hardy (1962).

== Death ==
Kilgore and his wife Dolores lived in Long Island's Queens Village. He died in New York in 1983 from an embolism.

== Awards ==
He was awarded the National Cartoonists Society Silver T-Square in 1976 for outstanding dedication or service to the Society or the profession and its Special Features Award in 1983 for his Elvis the Paper Doll Book.
