= Swan Lake (1981 film) =

1981 anime film directed by Kimio Yabuki

- Theatrical release poster
- Directed by: Kimio Yabuki
- Written by: Hirokazu Fuse
- Based on: Swan Lake by Pyotr Ilyich Tchaikovsky
- Produced by: Ken Ariga; Toshio Katsuta
- Music by: Peter Tchaikovsky
- Production company: Toei Animation
- Distributed by: Toei Company
- Release date: March 14, 1981 (Japan)
- Running time: 75 minutes (Japan)
- Country: Japan
- Language: Japanese

Swan Lake (世界名作童話 白鳥の湖, Sekai Meisaku Dōwa: Hakuchō no Mizuumi; lit. 'World Masterpiece Fairy Tales: Swan Lake') is an anime film based on the ballet Swan Lake by Pyotr Tchaikovsky.

The film was produced by Toei Animation to celebrate its 25th anniversary and was directed by Kimio Yabuki. Manga artist Yumiko Igarashi also worked on the film as character designer. The adaptation uses Tchaikovsky's score and remains relatively faithful to the story. The film was released in Japan on 14 March 1981 by Toei Company. It represents the fourth episode of Toei's World Masterpiece Fairy Tales, preceded by The Wild Swans (1977), Thumbelina (1978) and Twelve Months (1980), and continued with Aladdin and the Wonderful Lamp (1982). It was the first animated film to be distributed by The Samuel Goldwyn Company.

== Plot ==
The hero, Prince Siegfried, is out riding one day with his friends when he sees a swan with a crown on its head swimming on a lake. One of his friends, Adolf, tries to shoot the swan, but just before his arrow flies, Adolf is transformed into a statue. Siegfried's other friend Benno accuses the swan of practicing witchcraft, neither of them pondering the presence of an owl just behind them. Siegfried is unable to stop thinking about the swan, and decides to follow it as it swims away from its spot on the lake. Siegfried soon finds himself at a castle.

Siegfried watches in surprise as the swan transforms into a beautiful girl in a royal white dress. He approaches her - at first, she is frightened for him and tries to get him to leave, but at his perseverance, she starts to tell him her story. She is Princess Odette. Three years prior, she was kidnapped by the evil sorcerer Rothbart (the owl) who wanted her hand in marriage. Rothbart cursed her to be a swan by day so that no one will fall in love with her, as the only way Rothbart's power can be defeated is when a man loves her with all his heart and soul. Siegfried explains that he already felt something for her the moment he saw her eyes, and asks her to go to his birthday ball the next night, where he will choose her as his bride.

Although at first she refuses, Siegfried is intent and will not take no for an answer, convinces her and when she returns to her room, she daydreams of him. The entire story is being seen through the eyes of Hans and Margarita, two squirrels who are watching them.

Rothbart's daughter Odille tells him about Siegfried, and Rothbart goes to Odette to tell her to forget about the prince and consider marrying him. She rejects, revealing she has been in love with Siegfried for the past three years.

Rothbart is not going to let Odette go to the ball, so he bars the door and lifts the drawbridge. He and his daughter, Odille, then plot to get Odette to forget Siegfried by getting him to fall in love with someone else - Odille, disguised as Odette.

Odille, disguised as Odette in a black dress, goes to the ball and tricks Siegfried into believing she is the same woman he fell in love with. Meanwhile, Odette manages to escape from Rothbart's castle with the help of the squirrels Hans and Margarita, and hurries to Siegfried's castle.

Just as Odette is about to storm into the ballroom, Rothbart, who was already there observing Odille, disguised as Odette, carrying out her deception, grabs Odette, holds her mouth shut and brings her closer where she is able witness Siegfried dancing with Odille, disguised as Odette. Thus she watches in horror as Siegfried pledges his love to Odille, disguised as Odette, and announces her as his wife-to-be. Overcome with sorrow, Odette faints into Rothbart's arms.

Rothbart's laughter gets Siegfried's attention and the prince quickly realises his mistake. Odille reveals her true form and the three of them transform into their avian forms and fly back to the castle. Siegfried follows on horseback, where the final showdown between the two men takes place. Hans goes to help the Prince Siegfried but Rothbart transforms him into a toad.

Rothbart initially only wants to scare Siegfried away since he pledged himself to his daughter, but when Siegfried rebuffs his pledge, Odille demands he be killed. After a long fight with Rothbart, the sorcerer has Siegfried cornered and held at sword-point. To save his life, Odette promises to Rothbart that she will love and marry him, but Siegfried, unable to bear the thought of Odette being a prisoner to Rothbart forever, grabs and plunges the sword into his own heart and causes a flash of yellow light which obliterates both Rothbart and Odille. Consequently, all of Rothbart's magic is undone: his castle collapses, Adolf transforms back into a human, Hans and Margarita are reunited, and Odette's curse is broken.

Odette and Siegfried, who survive the castle's collapse, reunite and run into each other's arms. Margarita states that Odette and Siegfried's love was more powerful than all of Rothbart's magic, and Hans agrees he would love Margarita just as much. As the sun rises upon the ruins of Rothbart's castle, all the swans from the lake fly around Odette and Siegfried in celebration.

== Voices ==
Character	Original version (Japanese) [original version]	Frontier Enterprises version (English) [1st version]	Sync, Ltd. version (English) [2nd version]
Princess Odette (プリンセスオデット)	Keiko Takeshita (竹下 景子)	Nancy Link	Pam Dawber
Prince Siegfried (王子ジークフリート)	Taro Shigaki (志垣 太郎)	Steve Knode	Christopher Atkins
Rothbart (ロスバート)	Asao Koike (浅尾 小池)	Joseph Zucatti	David Hemmings
Odile (オディール)	Yōko Asagami (麻上 洋子)	Patricia Kobayashi	Kay Lenz
Hans (ハンス)	Yoneko Matsukane (松金 よね子)	Gerri Sorrells	Robert Axelrod
Margarita (マルガリータ)	Fuyumi Shiraishi (白石 冬美)	Nancy Culluci	Lara Cody
Queen Mother (皇太后)	Taeko Nakanishi (中西 妙子)	Judith Sackheim	Louise Chamis
Benno (ベノ)	Akira Murayama (村山 明)	Don Johnson	Ardwight Chamberlain
Minister (大臣)	Jōji Yanami (八奈見 乗児)	Mike Worman	Ted Lehmann
Adolf (アドルフ)	Mugihito (寺田 誠)	Greg Starr	John Hostetter
Princess Catherina (王女カテリーナ)	Chiyoko Kawashima (川島 千代子)	Helen Kataoka	Unknown
Princess Rosanna (プリンセスロザンナ)	Chiyoko Kawashima (川島 千代子)	Debbie Davidson	Unknown
Princess Francine (プリンセスフランシーヌ)	Seiko Nakano (中野 聖子)	Donna Zucatti	Unknown

== Music ==
The songs were composed by Masashi Wakamatsu and performed by Columbia Orchestra, while lyrics were written by Etsuko Bushika.

Ending theme

- "Lake of Love" (愛のみずうみ, Ai no mizuumi) (singer: Kyōko Ishige)

Insert song

- "Bright Day of Spring" (かがやく春の日, Kagayaku haru no hi ) (singer: Kyōko Ishige)

== English releases ==
Two separate English dubs were made including the first English version by Frontier Enterprises featuring regular voice actors, and the second English version by Sync, Ltd. featuring the celebrity Hollywood famous actors as the principal characters (Christopher Atkins as Siegfried, Pam Dawber as Odette, Kay Lenz as Odille, and David Hemmings as Rothbart). The second dub was recorded at Golden Sync Studios and aired on American Movie Classics in December 24, 1990, and The Disney Channel in January 11, 1994. It was distributed in North America by The Samuel Goldwyn Company. It was also distributed in France and the United Kingdom by Rouge Citron Production.

The film was released on DVD by Discotek Media on November 28, 2017. It has the original Japanese version and the two English dubs.
