= The Samuel Goldwyn Company =

American film company

- Logo used from 1978-1997
- Formerly: The Samuel Goldwyn Company (1978–1991); Samuel Goldwyn Entertainment (1991–1996); Goldwyn Entertainment Company (1996–1997); Goldwyn Films (1997–1999); G2 Films (1999); United Artists International (1999–2000)
- Type: Subsidiary
- Predecessor: Samuel Goldwyn Productions
- Founded: June 16, 1978; 48 years ago
- Founder: Samuel Goldwyn Jr.
- Defunct: July 2000; 26 years ago
- Fate: Folded by Metro-Goldwyn-Mayer
- Successor: Studio: Samuel Goldwyn Films; Library: Amazon MGM Studios
- Owner: Metromedia (1996–1997); Metro-Goldwyn-Mayer (1997–2000)
- Parent: Orion Pictures (1996–1997); United Artists (1999–2000)
- Divisions: Samuel Goldwyn Television; Samuel Goldwyn Home Entertainment; Heritage Entertainment, Inc.

The Samuel Goldwyn Company, later known as Samuel Goldwyn Entertainment, Goldwyn Entertainment Company, Goldwyn Films, G2 Films and United Artists International, was an American independent film company founded by Samuel Goldwyn Jr., the son of the famous Hollywood mogul, Samuel Goldwyn, on June 16, 1978. It was folded into Metro-Goldwyn-Mayer in July 2000.

== History ==
The company originally distributed and acquired art-house films from around the world to U.S. audiences; they soon added original productions to their roster as well, starting with The Golden Seal in 1983.

In succeeding years, the Goldwyn company was able to obtain (from Samuel Sr.'s estate) the rights to all films produced under the elder Goldwyn's supervision, including the original Bulldog Drummond (1929), Arrowsmith (1931), and Guys and Dolls (1955). The company also acquired some distribution rights to several films and television programs that were independently produced but released by other companies, including Sayonara, the Hal Roach–produced Laurel & Hardy–starring vehicle Babes in Toyland (1934), the Flipper television series produced by MGM Television, the Academy Award–winning Tom Jones (1963), and the Rodgers and Hammerstein film productions of South Pacific (1958) and Oklahoma! (1955), as well as the CBS Television adaptation of Cinderella (1965).

Animated films include Swan Lake, Aladdin and the Magic Lamp, The Care Bears Movie, The Chipmunk Adventure and Rock-a-Doodle. Among the television programs in the Goldwyn company's library are the television series American Gladiators, Gladiators (UK), Gladiators (Australia), Gladiators: Train 2 Win, and Steve Krantz's miniseries Dadah Is Death.

In 1991, after a merger with Heritage Entertainment, Inc., the company went public as Samuel Goldwyn Entertainment. Heritage and Goldwyn attempted to merge during late 1990, but the plans fell apart while Heritage went through a Chapter 11 bankruptcy. The merger also allowed Goldwyn to inherit the Landmark Theatres chain, which was a unit of Heritage.

That company and its library were acquired by Metromedia on July 2, 1996, for US$125 million. To coincide with the purchase, the Samuel Goldwyn Company was renamed Goldwyn Entertainment Company, and was reconstituted as a subsidiary of Metromedia's Orion Pictures unit. That year, Orion and Goldwyn became part of the Metromedia Entertainment Group (MEG). Goldwyn became the specialty films unit of MEG, though they would seek out films with crossover appeal. While Orion and Goldwyn would share the overhead costs, the production/acquisition operations would operate independently from each other.

In 1997, Metromedia sold its entertainment group to Metro-Goldwyn-Mayer (MGM) for $573 million, making that company's film library the largest at the time. The Landmark Theatres group, which Metromedia did not sell to MGM, was taken over by Silver Cinemas, Inc. on April 27, 1998.

In September 1997, Goldwyn Entertainment Company was renamed to Goldwyn Films and separated from Orion. The company remained a specialty films unit and an international sales holder. A month later, Samuel Goldwyn Jr. sued MGM and Metromedia, claiming that he was abruptly let go of the company despite promises that he would continue to run it under different ownership. Another concern in the lawsuit was the use of the Goldwyn name, with the defendants being accused of "palming off specialized films produced or acquired by" the unit as though the plaintiff was still involved in its management. As part of the settlement, MGM agreed to change the name of the company to G2 Films in January 1999.

In June 1999, MGM announced that it would restructure United Artists as an arthouse film producer/distributor to solely focus on competing with Disney's Miramax Films. They also announced that G2 Films would be folded under UA and would be renamed as United Artists International, with the same management and staff. UAI's new role would be handling the international sales for UA films overseas. In July 2000, MGM announced that it would close down United Artists International, with the possibility of forming a UK-based production operation in its place. MGM stated that the closure had been planned as early as December 1999, stating that lucrative international TV output deals had affected the box office results for UA's recent films internationally, and that it was easier to handle the distribution of the films under their new overseas distribution agreement with 20th Century Fox that was due to begin in November of that year. After the agreement started, UAI was folded into MGM's own operations.

The younger Goldwyn has since gone on to found Samuel Goldwyn Films. This successor company has continued to release independent films such as What the Bleep Do We Know!? and the Academy Award–nominated The Squid and the Whale. Since the new Goldwyn company was formed, MGM currently holds much of the original Goldwyn Company's holdings (including, with few exceptions, the non-Goldwyn-produced properties) that would end up with the library of Orion Pictures, now an MGM division. However, the Goldwyn Productions library is controlled by the Goldwyn family & licensed to Warner Bros. Pictures, except for The Hurricane, whose ownership returned to its original distributor, United Artists (also an MGM division).

== Filmography ==
=== 1970s ===
Release date	Title
June 1978	Zero to Sixty
June 15, 1979	The Water Babies
October 1979	The Last Word

=== 1980s ===
Release date	Title	Notes
February 8, 1981	Spetters	North American distribution only
June 19, 1981	Stevie	
July 23, 1981	Swan Lake	North American distribution only; produced by Toei Company, Ltd. and Toei Animation Company, Ltd.
March 21, 1982	Forbidden Zone	
May 26, 1982	Gregory's Girl	U.S. distribution rights currently owned by Film Movement
August 17, 1982	Aladdin and the Magic Lamp	North American distribution only; produced by Toei Company, Ltd. and Toei Animation Company, Ltd.
November 1982	Don't Cry, It's Only Thunder	
November 1982	Time Walker	
February 27, 1983	Bankers Also Have Souls	
August 12, 1983	The Golden Seal	
September 4, 1983	Lonely Hearts	
November 4, 1983	Experience Preferred... But Not Essential	
January 1984	Goodbye Pork Pie	
February 15, 1984	That Sinking Feeling	
May 1984	Another Time, Another Place	
August 17, 1984	Secrets	
September 12, 1984	A Joke of Destiny	
October 1, 1984	Stranger Than Paradise	Inducted into the National Film Registry in 2002
October 19, 1984	The Ploughman's Lunch	
November 1, 1984	Not for Publication	
January 25, 1985	The Perils of Gwendoline in the Land of the Yik-Yak	
March 29, 1985	The Care Bears Movie	produced by Nelvana
April 19, 1985	Petit Con	
May 17, 1985	Silver City	
June 2, 1985	The Holy Innocents	
August 9, 1985	Dance with a Stranger	North American distribution only
October 4, 1985	Always	
November 8, 1985	Bring On the Night	
November 18, 1985	Once Bitten	
February 14, 1986	Turtle Diary	
February 21, 1986	Getting Even	
March 7, 1986	Desert Hearts	currently owned by DD Productions with U.S. distribution rights currently licensed to Janus Films and The Criterion Collection
April 25, 1986	Three Men and a Cradle	
July 7, 1986	The Girl in the Picture	
November 7, 1986	Sid and Nancy	
January 30, 1987	Malandro	
March 13, 1987	Witchboard	international distribution only
March 20, 1987	Hollywood Shuffle	
May 8, 1987	Prick Up Your Ears	
May 22, 1987	The Chipmunk Adventure	produced by Bagdasarian Productions
July 17, 1987	Ping Pong	
August 27, 1987	Backlash	
August 28, 1987	The Rosary Murders	
September 11, 1987	A Prayer for the Dying	
November 13, 1987	Hello Mary Lou: Prom Night II	
April 13, 1988	Beatrice	
April 22, 1988	Two Moon Junction	international distribution only
July 22, 1988	Mr. North	
October 9, 1988	Hôtel Terminus: The Life and Times of Klaus Barbie	
October 21, 1988	Mystic Pizza	
March 3, 1989	Heart of Midnight	
October 13, 1989	Breaking In	
November 8, 1989	Henry V	
December 8, 1989	Fear, Anxiety & Depression	

=== 1990s ===
Release date	Title	Notes
February 2, 1990	Stella	international distribution only; co-production with Touchstone Pictures
May 11, 1990	Longtime Companion	
June 12, 1990	The Misadventures of Mr. Wilt	
August 17, 1990	Wild at Heart	currently owned by Universal Pictures
October 12, 1990	To Sleep with Anger	owned by Sony Pictures
November 2, 1990	C'est la vie	
March 1, 1991	My Heroes Have Always Been Cowboys	
March 8, 1991	La Femme Nikita	U.S. distribution rights currently owned by Sony Pictures Classics
May 22, 1991	Straight Out of Brooklyn	
May 24, 1991	Truly, Madly, Deeply	
September 20, 1991	Livin' Large	
October 4, 1991	Black Robe	U.S. distribution only; produced by Alliance Atlantis and Hoyts; U.S. distribution rights currently licensed to Samuel Goldwyn Films
October 11, 1991	City of Hope	owned by Sony Pictures
December 25, 1991	Madame Bovary	
February 5, 1992	Mississippi Masala	Owned by Mirabai Films, with U.S. distribution rights currently licensed to Janus Films and The Criterion Collection
April 3, 1992	Rock-a-Doodle	North American distribution only; produced by Goldcrest and Sullivan Bluth Studios
April 22, 1992	The Playboys	
May 13, 1992	The Waterdance	owned by Sony Pictures
July 10, 1992	The Best Intentions	distribution rights currently owned by Film Movement
November 11, 1992	Traces of Red	
November 14, 1992	Flirting	
December 25, 1992	Peter's Friends	
February 19, 1993	Mac	owned by Sony Pictures
March 3, 1993	The Stolen Children	
May 7, 1993	Much Ado About Nothing	distribution outside the U.K. and Ireland only
July 16, 1993	Road Scholar	
August 7, 1993	The Wedding Banquet	Inducted into the National Film Registry in 2023
September 24, 1993	Baraka	
September 24, 1993	The Program	international distribution outside the U.K. and Ireland only; co-production with Touchstone Pictures
October 15, 1993	Mr. Wonderful	international distribution only; distributed in North America by Warner Bros.
November 5, 1993	Wild West	
November 26, 1993	Thirty Two Short Films About Glenn Gould	
December 21, 1993	The Summer House	
January 28, 1994	Golden Gate	
March 18, 1994	Suture	
April 27, 1994	You So Crazy	
May 15, 1994	A Million to Juan	
June 3, 1994	Fear of a Black Hat	
June 10, 1994	Go Fish	
July 22, 1994	Just Like a Woman	
August 3, 1994	Eat Drink Man Woman	
September 9, 1994	What Happened Was	U.S. distribution rights currently owned by Oscilloscope Laboratories
October 6, 1994	Ladybird, Ladybird	
November 4, 1994	Oleanna	
November 18, 1994	To Live	distribution rights currently owned by Film Movement
December 28, 1994	The Madness of King George	
February 3, 1995	The Secret of Roan Inish	produced by First Look Pictures; U.S. distribution rights currently owned by Samuel Goldwyn Films
March 8, 1995	The Sum of Us	
April 14, 1995	The Last Good Time	
May 12, 1995	The Perez Family	
May 19, 1995	Rampo	
June 9, 1995	Wigstock: The Movie	
November 17, 1995	Reckless	
January 26, 1996	Angels & Insects	
April 19, 1996	August	
May 1, 1996	I Shot Andy Warhol	co-production with BBC Arena; distributed in the U.S. by Orion Pictures
May 10, 1996	Love Is All There Is	
August 23, 1996	Foxfire	North American theatrical distribution only; produced by Rysher Entertainment; distribution rights currently owned by Paramount Pictures
September 13, 1996	American Buffalo	
September 20, 1996	Big Night	North American theatrical distribution only; produced by Rysher Entertainment; distribution rights currently owned by Paramount Pictures
October 25, 1996	Palookaville	
December 16, 1996	The Preacher's Wife	co-production with Touchstone Pictures
February 28, 1997	Hard Eight	credited in promotional material as Goldwyn Entertainment Company; North American theatrical distribution only; produced by Rysher Entertainment; distribution rights currently owned by Paramount Pictures
April 11, 1997	Kissed	as Goldwyn Films
May 30, 1997	Rough Magic	as Goldwyn Entertainment Company
July 15, 1997	Paperback Romance	as Goldwyn Entertainment Company
October 10, 1997	Napoleon	as Goldwyn Films
November 7, 1997	The Hanging Garden	as Goldwyn Films
November 26, 1997	Bent	as Goldwyn Entertainment Company; U.S. distribution rights currently owned by Film Movement
January 16, 1998	Live Flesh	as Goldwyn Films; U.S. distribution rights currently owned by Sony Pictures Classics
February 20, 1998	I Love You, Don't Touch Me!	as Goldwyn Films
August 14, 1998	The Chambermaid on the Titanic	
September 25, 1998	Lolita	as Samuel Goldwyn Films; co-production with Pathé
November 6, 1998	Velvet Goldmine	as Goldwyn Films; distributed in the U.S. by Miramax Films; U.S. distribution rights currently owned by Sony Pictures Classics
November 13, 1998	Welcome to Woop Woop	as Goldwyn Entertainment Company
November 27, 1998	Immortality	as Goldwyn Films; distributed in the U.S. by Miramax Films
January 25, 1999	Tinseltown	as Samuel Goldwyn Films
May 14, 1999	Tea with Mussolini	as G2 Films
June 18, 1999	Desert Blue	as Samuel Goldwyn Films
September 17, 1999	Splendor	as Samuel Goldwyn Films; co-production with Summit Entertainment and Newmarket Capital Group

== Other names ==
- Samuel Goldwyn Entertainment
- Goldwyn Entertainment Company
- G2 Films
- Goldwyn Films

=== Successor ===
- Samuel Goldwyn Films
- United Artists Films, Inc. (1999–2006)

== See also ==
- Samuel Goldwyn Television
- Samuel Goldwyn Studio
- Samuel Goldwyn Productions
- Metro-Goldwyn-Mayer
- Samuel Goldwyn Films
