= The Wild Swans (1977 film) =

Japanese animated film

- Japanese theatrical release poster
- Directed by: Nobutaka Nishizawa
- Written by: Tomoe Takashi
- Based on: "The Six Swans" by Brothers Grimm; "The Wild Swans" by Hans Christian Andersen
- Produced by: Ken Ariga; Yoshifumi Hatano
- Starring: See § Voice cast
- Cinematography: Sanki Hirao; Tamio Hosoda
- Edited by: Yasuo Iseki
- Music by: Akihiro Komori
- Production company: Toei Animation
- Distributed by: Toei Company (Japan); Turner Program Services (North America)
- Release date: 19 March 1977 (Japan)
- Running time: 62 minutes
- Country: Japan
- Language: Japanese

The Wild Swans (世界名作童話 白鳥の王子, Sekai Meisaku Dōwa: Hakuchō no Ōji; lit. 'World Masterpiece Fairy Tales: The Swan Princes') is a 1977 Japanese anime fantasy film produced by Toei Animation, based on the Brothers Grimm's fairy tale The Six Swans and on Hans Christian Andersen's variation The Wild Swans. The film was first shown in Japan on 19 March 1977 in the Toei Manga Matsuri (Toei Cartoon Festival).

The Wild Swans represents the first entry in Toei's World Masterpiece Fairy Tales film series, followed by Thumbelina (1978), Twelve Months (1980), Swan Lake (1981), and Aladdin and the Wonderful Lamp (1982).

== Plot ==
One day, King Hildebrand and his hunters found a wild deer and wanted to capture it, but the king during the pursuit accidentally broke into a cursed magical forest, and the deer suddenly turned into a withered tree. When King Hildebrand blew his horn to seek help from the outside world to no avail, he attracted the attention of an old witch. The old witch told King Hildebrand about he can ask to her daughter, Greta for help, but he need to fulfill Greta's wish, because Greta was the only one who knew the way out of the forest. After the old witch took King Hildebrand to see Greta, Greta expressed to King Hildebrand that her wish would not cause him trouble. Greta knew that King Hildebrand had not married again since his wife died for a long time, she told King Hildebrand that he could marry her as his queen if he think she was pretty. King Hildebrand thought Greta was beautiful, so he accepted her request and left the forest smoothly.

In fact, King Hildebrand had been married for a long time, and his wife gave him seven children (six princes and a 12-year-old princess named Eliza). King Hildebrand's wife once wanted their children to live in a place surrounded by nature, so King Hildebrand specially arranged for the children to live in a castle in the forest. Sometimes King Hildebrand and his wife would often visit their children. When King Hildebrand's wife dies, she leaves behind many magical balls of yarn, one of which is the only thing that knows the way to the castle in the forest. At first Greta didn't know the king's secret, but later she learned the truth from a maid. King Hildebrand promised Greta that he would return when he visited his children, but three days had passed by the time he returned to the castle. Greta was dissatisfied that the king often left her to visit his children, so she stole the magic ball of yarn leading to the castle in the forest at night and went to the castle in the forest the next morning when the king was not around.

When Greta arrived at the castle in the forest, she waited until King Hildebrand's children came out and took out six pieces of enchanted white cloth on the spot to turn the six princes into swans. Only Eliza escaped and hid deep in the woods under the cover of her six elder brothers. Eliza watched sadly as her six brothers turned into swans and flew away, but she regained the courage to find their whereabouts under the comfort of her own tears that turned into elves. It was already winter when Eliza walked to the cave far away from her country, but when she found that her six brothers had flown back to resume their human form, she ran up to reunite with them.

That night, the princes explain to Eliza that after they turn into swans, they can only briefly return to their human form at night, and they will turn into swans after daylight. Once they wait until spring comes, they have to move to other cold places. After the princes specially prepared clothes for Eliza for the winter, they lived happily in the cave for a while until spring came. Before the princes left, they told Eliza that if she wanted to break the spell, she would have to be mute for six years and sew them six shirts made of yarn balls made from nettle threads. If she spoke or cried while knitting the shirt, they would be gone, so the princes were worried that Eliza would not be able to lift the spell for them. Although the princes could not bear the many risks their younger sister Eliza had taken to rescue them, Eliza was still determined to free her six elder brothers from the spell.

After the princes left, Eliza decided not to speak. She went around picking nettles and making many balls of nettle yarn. Eliza decided to go somewhere else when winter came so that she would not be unable to remain silent when her six elder brothers returned. After the princes flew back to the cave, they found that Eliza was missing and began to search for her, but Eliza had to choose to leave her six elder brothers and left the cave silently. Eliza settled down in a hollow tree and sewed shirts under the attention of the animals. During this period she successfully knitted five shirts. Six years later, just as Eliza was about to start knitting her last shirt, she was discovered by two hunters and a pack of hounds from a neighboring country and was taken out. It happened that when King Friedrich of the neighboring country discovered Eliza, he was fascinated by her beauty. Since King Friedrich could not bear to leave Eliza to live alone in the forest, he brought Eliza to the court and wanted to marry her.

On the other side, when King Hildebrand learned that Greta had turned his six sons into swans, he expelled Greta from his kingdom. Greta cried to her mother and asked her to help her marry another king. Later, the old witch fulfilled Greta's wish and cast a disease spell on the river near King Friedrich's country, but they found that Eliza beside King Friedrich was about to finish knitting six shirts. The old witch tells Greta not to worry, because there is only one week left for Eliza to lift the spell from her six elder brothers. If Eliza fails to knit six shirts by the deadline (which refers to when the church bells ring twelve) and give the six shirts to her six brothers to wear, then the princes will not be turned as human. Greta believes that as long as she gets rid of Eliza, she can win the heart of King Friedrich, and then she can also give King Hildebrand the best revenge.

When King Friedrich and his ministers were troubled by the problem of strange diseases in the country, the old witch persuaded King Friedrich and claimed that if they wanted to solve the problem, they must get rid of a witch who cast a spell on the kingdom. The old witch and Greta burned Eliza's remaining yarn balls, so that Eliza was arrested for picking nettles in the cemetery at night and was tried by the judge and burned at the stake under their unjust accusation. Later, when Eliza was taken to the stake, she took all of her shirts with her. Just as Eliza was about to be surrounded by fire, she saw her six elder brothers arriving to rescue her, so Eliza threw six shirts at her six elder brothers as they flew toward her. The princes successfully put on Eliza's shirt and transformed back into humans, and the swan feathers they dropped extinguished the fire at the stake. Eliza finally spoke after seeing her six elder brothers' spells lifted, much to the shock of the crowd.

The old witch was dissatisfied with this. When she tried to convince an executioner to set fire to Eliza and the six princes, he pushed her down and broke her magic wand. Shortly after the princes rescued their younger sister, they told King Friedrich the truth, so the old witch and her daughter Greta were taken to the stake. Eliza asked King Friedrich to change the sentence of the two witches and expel them from the wilderness. King Friedrich agreed to Eliza's request and expelled the old witch and her daughter Greta, preventing them from coming back here again. Eventually, Eliza married King Friedrich and lived happily ever after with the blessings of the people and her six elder brothers and their father, King Hildebrand.

== Voice cast ==
| Character | Original version (Japanese) [original version] | Turner Program Services version (English) |
|---|---|---|
| Eliza/Adult Eliza (エリザ) | Eiko Masuyama (増山江威子) | Corinne Orr |
| Greta (グレタ) | Kaneko Iwasaki (岩崎加根子) | |
| Tears (涙) | Yasuko Miyazaki (宮崎恭子) | Teardrop A (Corinne Orr) |
| King Hildebrand (ヒルデブランド王) | Yousuke Kondo (近藤洋介) | |
| Witch (魔女) | Tokuko Sugiyama (杉山とく子) | |
| King Friedrich (フリードリッヒ王) | Taro Mochizuki (望月太郎) | |
| Judge A (裁判官A) | Yasuyuki Kachi (可知靖之) | |
| Judge B (裁判官B) | Shoshin Kobayashi (小林尚臣) | |
| The Six Princes (六人の王子たち) | Kiyoshi Komiyama (小宮山清); Noriko Tsukase (つかせのりこ); Akira Kamiya (神谷明); Toru Furuya (古谷徹) | |

=== Additional voices ===
- Original: Midori Goto (後藤みどり), Noriko Kanzaki (神崎教子), Haiyuza Theater Company (俳優座), Aoni Production (青二プロダクション)
- English: Earl Hammond, Gilbert Mack

== Music ==
The songs were composed by Akihiro Komori and performed by Columbia Orchestra. The lyrics were written by actress Yasuko Miyazaki under the nickname Takaba.

1. "The Swan Princes" (白鳥の王子, Hakuchō no ōji) (singers: Eiko Masuyama and The Chirps)
2. "I'm Sorry" (なみだとねんね, Namida to ne nen'ne) (singers: Kumiko Ōsugi and The Chirps)

== International releases ==
The film was dubbed in English in 1983 by Sound Shop Inc. in New York under the direction of Peter Fernandez and released by Turner Program Services. It was later released on VHS in 1984 by RCA Columbia Pictures Home Video.

In Italy, the film was theatrically released on 24 November 1978 under the title "Heidi Becomes Princess" (Italian: Heidi diventa principessa). This was done to capitalize on a vague likeness between Eliza and Heidi from Heidi, Girl of the Alps, which had gained huge popularity in Italy that same year. Eliza's name was changed to Heidi in the film, and Heidi's Italian child voice actress was hired to dub the character. The Italian version is a few minutes shorter, and features narration provided by the Italian narrator of the Heidi series.

The film was also dubbed in Spanish, French, German, Hungarian, Russian, Greek, Korean, Cantonese, and Arabic.
