= Lionel Wilson (voice actor) =

American voice actor and writer

- Born: Lionel Lazarus Salzer; March 22, 1924; Brooklyn, New York, U.S.
- Died: April 30, 2003 (aged 79); Manhattan, New York, U.S.
- Education: New York University
- Occupations: Actor; author
- Years active: 1936–2001

Lionel Wilson (born Lionel Lazarus Salzer; March 22, 1924 – April 30, 2003) was an American actor and author of children's books. He was known for his roles from Tom Terrific through to his last role, voicing Eustace Bagge on the Cartoon Network's Courage the Cowardly Dog.

== Career ==
=== As stage actor ===
Lionel Wilson's interest in acting on the stage began at an early age—his first professional stage performance was in 1936 at the age of twelve. A few years later, he was selected for the 1942 Barter Theatre Scholarship, which included summer in a kind of boot camp for aspiring thespians. Over the course of his career he played in at least 25 professional stage productions, including four on Broadway:

- Dodsworth, as bellboy and as a lost boy. 1936.
- Macbeth, as a witch and as a messenger. 1940.
- The Merry Widow, as Nish. 1942, 1955, and 1958.
- Janie, as Scooper Nolan (replacement), and Deadpan Hackett (replacement). Broadway, 1943–44.
- The Male Animal, as Wally Meyers. 1944.
- Good Morning Corporal, as Alvin Stacey. Broadway, 1944.
- Kiss and Tell, as Dexter Franklin (replacement). Broadway, 1945–46.
- My Sister Eileen, as Frank Lippincott. 1945–46.
- Tenting Tonight, as Elliott Smollens. 1947.
- Joan of Lorraine, as one of Joan's brothers. 1947.
- John Loves Mary, as Fred Taylor. 1948.
- Waltz me Around Again, as Rick. 1948.
- The Intruder, as Tommy. 1952–53.
- High Button Shoes, as Mr. Pontdue. 1954.
- Fragile Fox, as Corporal Jackson. Broadway, 1954.
- Rio Rita, as Chick Bean. 1955.
- Wonderful Town, as Valenti. 1955.
- Harvey, as Elwood P. Dowd. 1956.
- Girl Crazy, as Slick Fothergill. 1956.
- Once in a Lifetime, as Rudolph Kammerling. 1964.
- How to Succeed in Business Without Really Trying, as Bud Frump. 1965–66 and 1968
- The Fantasticks, as Henry Albertson. 1967–1969.
- Sweet Charity, as Oscar Lindquist. 1968.
- Cactus Flower, as Harvey Greenfield. 1969.
- A Midsummer Night's Dream, as Francis Flute playing Thisbe. 1973.
- The Soldier's Tale, as the devil. 1984.

=== As television actor ===
Although his primary interest continued to be the stage, he also undertook supporting roles in several TV series. Since supporting roles are sometimes uncredited, the following list may be incomplete:

- Martin Kane, Private Eye, unidentified episode, 1949. NBC TV.
- The Silver Theatre, as a snooper in “Till Death Do Us Part”, 1949. CBS TV.
- Armstrong Circle Theatre, as a clerk in “The Jackpot”, season 1, episode 2, 13 June 1950. NBC TV.
- The Magic Cottage, as Father Time, 28 December 1950 and an unidentified 1954 episode. Unfortunately, most episodes have apparently been lost, along with the credits. DuMont TV.
- The Aldrich Family, as George Bigelow, occasional unidentified episodes, 1952–53. NBC TV.
- Broadway Television Theatre, as Kiwi in The Hasty Heart, season 3 episode 4, November 1953; as Scooper in Janie, season 3 episode 5, November 1953; as Leo Davis in Room Service, season 3 episode 14, January 1954. WOR-TV (New York City).
- Valiant Lady, unidentified episodes, 1953–1957. CBS TV.
- The Ed Sullivan Show, scene from Fragile Fox, November 7, 1954. CBS TV.
- Search for Tomorrow unidentified episodes. CBS TV.

=== As voice actor ===
Wilson majored in Radio Production at New York University and an early venture in voiceover performance was in 1950, in the NBC radio show Top Secret. To provide an income more stable than that from stage acting he took on more voiceover work in the 1950s with television commercials. In 1957, Gene Deitch invited him to work at Terrytoons, voicing all the characters for the innovative cliffhanger cartoon series Tom Terrific, including Mighty Manfred the Wonder Dog and memorable baddie Crabby Appleton. He continued to be involved in Terrytoon cartoons and cartoon series and he also took on projects with other studios.

In 1999, at the age of 75, Wilson landed the role of Eustace Bagge on the Cartoon Network animated series Courage the Cowardly Dog, and he reprised that role in the Cartoon Network's Staylongers series in the summer of 2000. In 2001, after completing 33 Courage episodes, Wilson retired due to illness and was replaced by Arthur Anderson.

Here is a more comprehensive list of Wilson's voiceover credits:

- Top Secret (NBC Radio, 1950), voicing Admiral Strassner impersonating Karen Gaza in “The Admiral's Strange Identity”.
- Tom Terrific series (Terrytoons, 1957) voicing all characters. The series consisted of 26 storylines, each of which had five 5-minute episodes.
- John Doormat series of four episodes (Terrytoons, 1957–58), voicing John Doormat and his wife.
- A Bum Steer (Terrytoons, 1957) voicing unidentified characters.
- Clint Clobber Theatrical Series (Terrytoons, 1957–59) voicing Miss O'Leery, radio announcer, and dog in the episodes Clint Clobber's Cat, Springtime for Clobber, and The Flamboyant Arms.
- Gaston le Crayon (Terrytoons, 1959) voicing unidentified characters in "Gaston's Baby".
- Sidney the Elephant series of 19 episodes (Terrytoons, 1958–63), one of which, Sidney's Family Tree, was nominated for an Academy Award as best short subject in 1958.
- Deputy Dawg (Terrytoons, 1959–1972) as voice of Vincent Van Gopher and Possible Possum in unidentified episodes.
- Many Moons (Rembrandt Films, 1962), voicing Jester, Royal Mathematician, and Royal Wizard. This animated cartoon was later used as one segment of the 1965 film Alice of Wonderland in Paris.
- The Hector Heathcote Show (Terrytoons, 1963), repeating 16 of the Sidney the Elephant series.
- The Possible Possum series of 37 shorts (Terrytoons, 1965–1971), voicing Possible Possum, Macon Mouse, Owlawishus Owl, Billy Bear and other minor characters.
- Martian Moochers animated series (Terrytoons, 1966), spun off from Possible Possum, voicing an unidentified character in the episode "Champion Chump".
- The Mighty Heroes animated series of 20 seven-minute episodes (Terrytoons 1966–67), Ralph Bakshi's spoof of super avengers, voicing Rope Man, Cuckoo Man, and James Hound. Ten of these made-for-TV episodes were later released to theaters, some in expanded form.
- The Astronut Show (Terrytoons, 1965–1970) voicing Astronut in two episodes, Martian Moocher in one episode, and Cuckoo Man and Rope Man in one episode. This program also included repeats of the Sidney the Elephant series.
- The Merry Makers (Paramount/Famous Pictures, 1967) voicing all characters in the four episodes.
- The World of Hans Christian Andersen (Hal Roach Studios, 1968), an English-language version of a Japanese anime, dubbing Hannibal Mouse, Mayor, and Watchdog.
- The Emperor's New Armor (Ariel Productions and Pyramid Films, 1969) voicing part of the narration.
- Winky Dink and You! (Screen Magic, Inc., 1969 revival) voicing all characters in the 52 episodes.
- Marco Polo Junior Versus the Red Dragon (Animation International, 1972), an Australian full-length cartoon, voicing unidentified characters.
- Enchanted Journey (Film Gallery, Inc., 1981), the English-language release of a Japanese anime, dubbing the voice of Glikko.
- Superbook (Anime Oyako Gekijō)) (Christian Broadcasting Network, 1981), voicing miscellaneous voices in unidentified episodes.
- Miracle at Intervale (Board of Jewish Education, 1981), voices by Lionel Wilson and six others.
- The Season of Our Joy (Board of Jewish Education, 1982), script by Lionel Wilson, narration not credited.
- Braingames, (HBO, 1983–1985) narrating Odd Card Out / Safari Solitaire and Mysteriosos / The Riddler in the six episodes.
- Star Blazers (Claster Television, 1984), the English adaptation of the Japanese anime series Space Battleship Yamato, dubbing the voice of Jason Jetter in episodes 53-77.
- The Secret of Mulan (United American Video, 1998) feature cartoon, voicing Mala Khan.
- Courage the Cowardly Dog (Cartoon Network, 1999–2001), voicing Eustace Bagge in 33 episodes, each comprising two segments.
- Staylongers series (Cartoon Network, summer 2000), voicing Eustace Bagge.

A Filmography in Internet Movie Database (at "Lionel Wilson (II) (1924–2003)". IMDb.) as of 26 October 2018 lists a few additional voiceover credits but does not indicate the source of the information.

=== As audiobook narrator ===
In between his other activities, he narrated or helped narrate over 100 children's audiobooks.

=== As author ===
Wilson wrote a dozen books for children, the scripts for several of his audiobooks such as the Clifford series, and authored or co-authored the plays Pocket Full O'Rye (with Stanley Schacter), Simon Says (with Fred Ebb), Oh Where Have You Been, Billy Boy (with Lawrence N. Kasha), Come And Be Killed, and The Mischief on Merry Mountain.

== Death ==
Wilson died of pneumonia on April 30, 2003, at the age of 79.

== General references ==
- Beck, Jerry (2005). The Animated Movie Guide. Chicago Review Press. OCLC 218663760.
- Brooks, Tim; Marsh, Earle F. (2003). The Complete Directory to Prime Time Network and Cable TV Shows, 1946–Present (8th ed.). Random House. OCLC 865212402.
- Lenburg, Jeff (1983). The Encyclopedia of Animated Cartoon Series. Da Capo Press (corrected edition, originally published by Arlington House 1981). Archived 7 May 2018. OCLC 123211250.
- McCall, Douglas L. (2005). Film Cartoons : a guide to 20th century American animated features and shorts. McFarland & Company. OCLC 72762683.
- Terrace, Vincent (2013). Television Specials: 5336 Entertainment Programs, 1936–2012 (2nd ed.). McFarland & Company. OCLC 859375035.
- Webb, Graham (2000). The Animated Film Encyclopedia: A Complete Guide to American Shorts, Features and Sequences, 1900–1979. McFarland & Company. OCLC 607142675.
- Wilson, Lionel (2018). "and also in the cast ...": The Saga of a Supporting Player. CreateSpace Independent Publishing Platform. ISBN 978-1720738398. (Wilson's autobiography, completed in 1999 and published posthumously)
