= Aladdin and the Wonderful Lamp (1982 film) =

- Theatrical release poster
- Directed by: Yoshikatsu Kasai
- Written by: Akira Miyazaki
- Based on: Aladdin
- Produced by: Yasuo Yamaguchi
- Cinematography: Toshiharu Takei
- Edited by: Yasuhiro Yoshikawa
- Music by: Katsuhiro Tsubono
- Production company: Toei Animation Company, Ltd.
- Distributed by: Toei Company, Ltd.
- Release date: 13 March 1982 (Japan)
- Running time: 65 minutes
- Country: Japan
- Language: Japanese

Aladdin and the Wonderful Lamp (世界名作童話 アラジンと魔法のランプ, Sekai Meisaku Dōwa: Arajin to Mahō no Ranpu; lit. 'World Masterpiece Fairy Tales: Aladdin and the Magic Lamp') is a 1982 Japanese anime fantasy film produced by Toei Animation, based on the Middle Eastern folk tale of Aladdin. The film was released in Japan on 13 March 1982 by Toei Company.

Preceded by The Wild Swans (1977), Thumbelina (1978), Twelve Months (1980) and Swan Lake (1981), it represents the fifth and final entry in Toei's World Masterpiece Fairy Tales film series.

== Plot ==
Aladdin and the Wonderful Lamp revolves around Aladdin, an impoverished but street smart kid who lives in an Arabian city somewhere in a desert with his mother. Along with his gang of friends, they steal from the local merchants and market sellers to survive. One day he is approached by an evil wizard who offers to reward him great riches, if he will accompany him to a cave somewhere in the desert, and retrieve a lamp from within.

Aladdin succeeds in doing this, even acquiring the hall of thousand lights where the lamp is found. However, upon return to the cave entrance, the wizard seals him in after Aladdin refuses to hand over the lamp, having become suspicious of the wizard.

Trapped, Aladdin however uses a magic ring, provided by the wizard before venturing into the cave, and summons a Genie who is able to free him from the cave. While en route home through the desert, Aladdin meets a jerboa that he adopts as a pet.

Returning home, Aladdin discovers that the lamp contains a more powerful Genie who upon Aladdin's first wish, conjures up a succulent meal for him and his mother.

The next day, after Aladdin sells the golden plated dinnerware from the meal, he encounters a young attractive girl, who he quickly discovers is actually the Sultan's daughter Princess Badral.

Badral is hiding from the Grand Wazir's son, whom her father has agreed to offer her hand in marriage to. The two spend time together out on the town before Badral is eventually found and escorted back to the palace. Aladdin, having now fallen in love with her, decides to marry Badral himself.

With the help of the Genie of the lamp, Aladdin becomes a wealthy prince and asks the Sultan for his daughter's hand in marriage. Having already promised her to the Grand Wazir's son, the Sultan instead decrees that whichever of the two suitors brings him the best dowry, will marry Badral.

Aladdin easily wins, while the Grand Wazir and his son are arrested for using stolen wealth to increase their dowry. Once married, Aladdin then uses the Genie of the lamp to build a grand palace for him and Badral. One day, however, while Aladdin and his friends are out hunting with the Sultan, the wizard from earlier dupes Aladdin's mother and Badral into trading him the lamp for a new one.

With the lamp in his possession, he then wishes Aladdin's palace and all within it transported to his castle in Africa. Furious, the Sultan charges Aladdin with three days to rescue his daughter, otherwise Aladdin's friends will be executed.

After losing his camel in the desert, Aladdin calls upon the Genie of the Ring that he still has. He warns however that he cannot undo the spell of the Genie of the lamp, but can transport Aladdin to where the palace is. The effort to do so causes the ring to crumble. Once there, Aladdin reunites with Badral. The two defeat the wizard and use the lamp to undo his wish. The film ends with Aladdin and Badral sealing the lamp in a locked chest and disposing of its key.

== Voice cast ==
Character	Original version (Japanese) [original version]	Frontier Enterprises version (English) [1st version]	Sync, Ltd. version (English) [2nd version]
Aladdin (アラジン)	Kazuo Kamiya (神谷和夫)	John Armstrong	Christopher Atkins
Princess Badral (ブドール姫)	Keiko Suzuka (鈴鹿景子)	Gerri Sorrells	Kristy McNichol
The Wizard (妖術師)	Kikuo Kaneuchi (金内喜久夫)	Joseph Zucatti	John Carradine
Aladdin's Mother (アラジンの母)	Reiko Nanao (七尾伶子)	Judy Sackheim	June Lockhart
Genie of the Ring (指輪の精)	Yoshisada Sakaguchi (坂口芳貞)	Bill Ross	Mike Reynolds
The Sultan (王様)	Kazuo Kitamura (北村和夫)	Mike Worman	Ted Lehman
Grand Wazir (大臣)	Takeshi Katō (加藤武)	Richard Murphy	Jan Rabson
Wazir's Son (大臣の息子)	Kimihiro Reizei (冷泉公裕)	Don Johnson	Ardwight Chamberlain
Genie of the Lamp (ランプの精)	Kazuo Kitamura (北村和夫)	Dick Murphy	John Hausteader

Additional voices

- Patty Foley (Street Urchins, Royal Handler B)

== Music ==
Japanese opening theme

- Mahou no Akari/Let It Burn (魔法のあかり, lit. "Magic Light") by Mickie Yoshino (arrangement), Yukihide Takekawa (music) and Michio Yamagami (lyrics), sung by Godiego

Japanese closing theme

- Aladdin no Lamp/Genie of the Lamp (アラジンのランプ, lit." Aladdin's Lamp") by Mickie Yoshino (arrangement), Yukihide Takekawa (music) and Michio Yamagami (lyrics), sung by The Godiego

Incidental music composed by Katsuhiro Tsubono

English opening/closing themes

- Angel's Flight by Chuck Greenberg, performed by Shadowfax

== English releases ==
The film was originally dubbed in English by Frontier Enterprises (directly in Japan with a cast of American expatriates). This dub received a VHS release by Media Home Entertainment in August 16, 1988, in the United States.

An alternative English dub version by Sync, Ltd. under the title Aladdin and the Magic Lamp, was recorded and mixed at Golden Sync Studios and released in North America by The Samuel Goldwyn Company. This featured the celebrity famous Hollywood voice actor cast including Christopher Atkins as Aladdin, Kristy McNichol as The Princess, John Carradine as The Wizard and June Lockhart as Aladdin's Mother. The opening and closing credits music was "Angel's Flight" by Chuck Greenberg and performed by Shadowfax on Windham Hill Records replaced the Godiego songs. This dub aired on The Disney Channel on September 3, 1984, and American Movie Classics on April 5, 1992, but has not seen a home media release to date.
