= The Mighty Heroes =

American animated television series

- Title card
- Genre: Animation, comedy
- Created by: Ralph Bakshi
- Directed by: Ralph Bakshi; Robert Taylor
- Voices of: Herschel Bernardi; Lionel Wilson
- Country of origin: United States
- Original language: English
- No. of seasons: 1
- No. of episodes: 21

Production
- Executive producer: William M. Weiss
- Running time: 30 min
- Production companies: CBS; Terrytoons

Original release
- Network: CBS
- Release: October 29, 1966 – March 11, 1967

The Mighty Heroes is an American Saturday morning animated television series created by Ralph Bakshi for the Terrytoons company. The original show debuted on CBS, on October 29, 1966, and ran for one season with 21 episodes.

The stories took place in Good Haven, a fictitious city that was continually beset by various supervillains. When trouble occurred, the city launched a massive fireworks display to summon a quintet of high-flying superheroes into action—Strong Man, Rope Man, Tornado Man, Cuckoo Man, and Diaper Man.

== Premise ==
In Act 1 of each episode, the team members were portrayed as accident-prone bunglers. A typical scenario involved them getting entangled and clumsily offering stock apologies while falling together, often leading to their capture by the villain. In Act 2, after escaping the villain's deathtrap in the cliffhanger, the team always managed to regroup and fight with proper coordination to emerge victorious. Their roster of villains included the Drifter, the Ghost Monster, the Enlarger, the Frog, the Junker, the Monsterizer, the Toy Man, the Shocker, the Shrinker, and the Scarecrow.

== Production ==
The cartoons originally appeared as a segment of the long-running Mighty Mouse Playhouse during the 1966–67 season, which was renamed Mighty Mouse and The Mighty Heroes in recognition of the new segment. Some weeks during the network run, two complete Mighty Heroes segments would open and close the show with a classic Mighty Mouse cartoon in-between. In other weeks, one Mighty Heroes episode would be split in two to open and close the show, with two Mighty Mouse cartoons broadcast in-between.

The character voices were provided by Herschel Bernardi, who provided all voices of Strong Man, Diaper Man, and Tornado Man, and Lionel Wilson, who provided Cuckoo Man and Rope Man. Bernardi was also the original provider of the "Ho Ho Ho" voice of the Jolly Green Giant and of StarKist's Charlie the Tuna's voice in commercials. Wilson was also the voice of the title character in another famous Terrytoons series, Tom Terrific.

Only 21 episodes of The Mighty Heroes were ever produced; the series came to an end when Bakshi left Terrytoons in 1967.

== Post first-run syndication ==
Reruns of The Mighty Heroes were eventually syndicated by Viacom (now CBS Media Ventures) in the 1970s as part of the Mighty Mouse package. There have also been two licensed VHS releases. Ten of the Mighty Heroes cartoons were also run as theatrical shorts in movie theaters between 1969 and 1971.

The characters appeared in animated form as guest stars in the episode "Heroes and Zeroes" of the 1987 series Mighty Mouse: The New Adventures, produced by Bakshi, in which they had all retired and were running the accounting firm of Man, Man, Man, Man and Man. Even Diaper Man had grown up, evidenced by his having a mustache. They were later included as a cameo in the 1999 Terrytoons pilot Curbside.

== Home video ==
In 1985 Children's Video Library (under license from Viacom) released VHS tapes with a variety of stars.

1. 0180 "The Good Guys Hour" includes 1) The Shrinker, 2) The Monsterizer as well as Mighty Mouse, Deputy Dawg and James Hound cartoons.
2. 0181 "The Good Guys" includes 1) The Plastic Blaster, 2) The Frog as well as Mighty Mouse, Deputy Dawg and Hector Heathcoat cartoons.

Later in 1989 they released two Mighty Heroes VHS Tapes with 6 cartoons on each tape, covering the first 12 cartoons of the series.

1. TT 2630 1) The Shrinker, 2) The Monsterizer, 3) The Plastic Blaster, 4) The Frog, 5) The Junker, 6) The Ghost Monster
2. TT 2631 1) The Stretcher, 2) The Drifter, 3) The Shocker, 4) TheEnlarger, 5) The Toy Man, 6) The Duster

In 2022, Amazon FreeVee uploaded the Video Treasures VHS tapes (complete with VHS streaking and glitches) for free streaming on Amazon.com, and many cable TV carriers.

== Comic books ==
There are three comic book adaptations of The Mighty Heroes. The first series was published by Dell Comics in 1967 and ran for four issues. The second series was published by Spotlight Comics in 1987 and ran for one issue. The third series was published by Marvel Comics in 1998 and also ran for one issue; this comic provided an origin story for the Heroes, and also the real names of the four adult members of the team.

== Characters ==
All five of the Mighty Heroes had the power to fly. Individually, they were:

- Strong Man has super strength. He speaks with a friendly farm-boy type of accent and holds a civilian job as a mechanic. His favorite fighting move is his "jet-propelled blow", by which he will fly into a villain fist-first. According to the 1998 comic book, his real name is Gomer Steed.
- Rope Man is a sailor who works at the docks. Erudite with a British accent, he can transform into a seemingly unending length of rope. He can use his hands like lassos, and can even weave himself into a net. The drawbacks to his powers are that he frequently gets tangled up or knotted, more often than not, around his own teammates. According to the 1998 comic book, his real name is Chap Goodlee.
- Tornado Man is a television weather forecaster who can spin himself into a tornado. He often sucks the villains into his vortex, then shoots them out toward the nearest wall. He speaks in a wheezy voice. According to the 1998 comic book, his real name is Dusty Storm.
- Cuckoo Man is a bird shop owner whose powers are the most limited of the group. Unlike the other Mighty Heroes, all four of whom can fly with no effort, Cuckoo Man has to flap his arms almost constantly in order to keep aloft. The conclusion of every episode always shows him lagging behind the others as they fly off into the distance. Cuckoo Man changes into his costume by jumping up through the bottom of his store's cuckoo clock and popping out through the little door. While the other Mighty Heroes's flying is accompanied by a "jet" sound effect similar to Mighty Mouse's, Cuckoo Man's is represented by a chugging jalopy-engine sound. According to the 1998 comic book, his real name is Mortimer Moore.
- Diaper Man is a red-headed, diapered, yet fully articulate baby, as well as the leader of the group, who sounds a lot like Popeye the Sailor Man. His main weapon is his bottle, which, by holding on to the rubber nipple, he can swing around (or shoot like a slingshot) forcefully. The bottle can also shoot high pressure streams of baby formula. In emergencies, Diaper Man (and often Strong Man) will drink some formula from the bottle whenever extra strength is needed.

None of the real names of the Mighty Heroes were ever revealed, nor were origin stories told for any of them, in any of the animated cartoons. In the 1998 comic book, they got their powers and costumes when a meteor-like being crashed down on Earth; his duty was to grant mighty powers to the most deserving people on the planet, but in this case he made a mistake. Nevertheless, the empowered quintet were determined to prove that they were indeed worthy to be called the Mighty Heroes.

== Episodes ==
No.	Title	Original release date
1	"The Plastic Blaster"	October 29, 1966
2	"The Frog"	November 5, 1966
3	"The Junker"	November 12, 1966
4	"The Shrinker"	November 19, 1966
5	"The Ghost Monster"	November 26, 1966
6	"The Stretcher"	December 3, 1966
7	"The Monsterizer"	December 10, 1966
8	"The Drifter"	December 17, 1966
9	"The Shocker"	December 24, 1966
10	"The Enlarger"	December 31, 1966
11	"The Toy Man"	January 7, 1967
12	"The Dusters"	January 14, 1967
13	"The Big Freeze"	January 21, 1967
14	"The Timekeeper"	January 28, 1967
15	"The Scarecrow"	February 4, 1967
16	"The Time Eraser"	February 11, 1967
17	"The Return of the Monsterizer"	February 18, 1967
18	"The Paper Monster"	February 25, 1967
19	"The Raven"	March 4, 1967
20	"The Bigger Digger"	March 11, 1967
21	"The Proton Pulsator"	March 18, 1967
