= Alice in Wonderland or What's a Nice Kid like You Doing in a Place like This? =

- Written by: Bill Dana
- Directed by: Alex Lovy
- Starring: (See below)
- Music by: Charles Strouse; Lee Adams (lyrics)
- Country of origin: United States

Production
- Producers: William Hanna; Joseph Barbera
- Running time: 49 minutes
- Production company: Hanna-Barbera Productions

Original release
- Network: ABC
- Release: March 30, 1966

Alice in Wonderland or What's a Nice Kid Like You Doing in a Place Like This? is a 1966 American animated television special written by Bill Dana (who also appears in its cast) and produced by Hanna-Barbera. It was broadcast on the ABC network on March 30, 1966, in an hour slot (including commercials). The songs were written by composer Charles Strouse and lyricist Lee Adams, who were most famous for Bye Bye Birdie. The songs were orchestrated by Marty Paich, who also provided musical direction; plus devised and arranged that part of the underscoring that was drawn from the musical numbers. The rest of the underscoring was drawn from the vast library of cues that Hanna-Barbera's in-house composer Hoyt Curtin had written for various animated series.

== Storyline ==
This adaptation of the 1865 novel Alice's Adventures in Wonderland is essentially, and very intentionally, a modern riff on the classic tale: while trying to read the original Lewis Carroll book for a book report, Alice tries to fend off her little white dog Fluff, who is in a very playful mood, and tosses a ball for him to chase. It bounces toward and magically through the living room TV screen—and Fluff, in hot pursuit, disappears right after it. Alice goes after Fluff and of course winds up falling through herself, and entering Wonderland.

== Characters ==
With this being Wonderland through the "looking glass" of a TV screen, the creative team had all the excuse they needed to reinterpret all the iconic Wonderland characters as TV celebrities. In some cases, this involved a celebrity voice and persona: Howard Morris lent the shy, sweet, impish persona he had often employed in sketch comedy to the White Rabbit. Harvey Korman brought his take on effete eccentricity to the Mad Hatter. Zsa Zsa Gabor played a glamorous Queen of Hearts replete with Hungarian accent and a penchant for calling people "darling", and Sammy Davis Jr. played the Cheshire Cat as a groovy, rockin', swingin' feline beatnik.

=== Cameos ===
Fred Flintstone (voiced by Alan Reed speaking, Henry Corden singing) and Barney Rubble (voiced by Mel Blanc) literally play themselves as the Caterpillar, which is re-interpreted as two veteran vaudevillians in a caterpillar costume with heads on either end (the neckline of each respective head opening mimics their costumes from The Flintstones: Fred's has a necktie and Barney's features the signature cross-stitching of his tunic). Bill Dana's portrayal of the White Knight is a manifestation of Jose Jimenez, the Hispanic immigrant character he perfected in standup routines and on sitcoms (very likely this interpretation of the White Knight was also a comic nod to the most unlikely and famous knight-errant of all, the Spanish novelist Miguel de Cervantes' Don Quixote). Character actor Allan Melvin provided a voice inspired by Humphrey Bogart for the "hard-boiled" criminal egg, Humphrey Dumpty. And Hedda Hatter (a new character who pops into the Mad Tea Party at the behest of the Mad Hatter) is voiced by gossip columnist Hedda Hopper. It would be her last "public appearance"; she died two months prior to the film's initial broadcast.

== Broadcast history ==
Rexall and Coca-Cola sponsored this feature, and characters from the movie appeared in the Rexall commercials (the playing time of the film as reported here does not include the commercials, which are neither part of the narrative nor the work of the core creative team). The show was repeated on ABC primetime only once, a year later, and has rarely been rebroadcast since, most recently on Cartoon Network. To date, it has never been officially released on home video in any format (though unofficial digital transfers can be found).

== Audio adaptation ==
After the movie was broadcast, Hanna-Barbera Records commercially released a vinyl LP, which is often misidentified as a soundtrack album but is in fact a completely (or nearly-completely) re-recorded audio adaptation, with a largely different cast. (Note: It bears noting that there was indeed a limited release, one-sided soundtrack LP of the songs only, exactly as heard on the special, performed by the original TV cast, distributed to industry professionals as a promotional item for the show and its sponsor Rexall.) The album employs much re-worked dialogue to aid the compression and to fill in for absent visuals (occasionally leading to radically rewritten scenes that cover the same dramatic territory, in particular the first White Rabbit sequence), and a slightly reduced orchestration of the songs (i.e. the shape and substance of the arrangements are essentially the same, but reconceived for and played by a smaller orchestra, lacking the TV show's harp, jazz organ [featured in the title song] and somewhat fuller complement of strings, brass and winds. The identical-sounding performances of the songs They'll Never Split Us Apart and Today's a Wonderful Day do, however, suggest that a certain small amount of soundtrack material may have been inserted for expedience). Bill Dana's teleplay was adapted for records by Charles Shows, a ubiquitous and major animation writer of the period, who wrote most of the story albums produced by Hanna-Barbera Records, and retains his usual "stories" credit on the back of the album cover. There has never been a second printing, re-release or digital release of the album. In Shows' de facto career autobiography Walt (which centers on his time with the Disney Studios), his anecdote about having to bang out the Alice script in a weekend falsely indicates, by not particularizing the LP, that he was asked to write the actual special.

=== Audio cast changes ===
With the exception of Bill Dana, all of the celebrity voices were replaced on the album by actors from Hanna-Barbera's stable of voice actors. Don Messick voiced the White Rabbit (replacing Howard Morris). Henry Corden not only reprised Fred Flintstone's singing voice, but assumed his speaking voice as well (replacing Alan Reed, a part he would officially take over in 1977 after Reed's death). The character of Hedda Hatter was cut, her material combined with that of the Mad Hatter, and the latter was voiced by Daws Butler (replacing Harvey Korman and giving the role a completely different, Ed Wynn-inspired spin). Mel Blanc moved into Butler's previous role as the March Hare. Janet Waldo, the speaking voice of Alice, does uncredited double duty as the Queen of Hearts, via an impression of her predecessor Zsa Zsa Gabor. Sammy Davis Jr., unable to provide the speaking and singing voice of the Cheshire Cat because he was under exclusive contract to Reprise Records, was replaced by Scatman Crothers.

=== Critical reception ===
Cash Box gave the album a positive review, calling it a "natural followup to the TV'er" and noting "this waxing by the original TV cast is likely to be popular on the adult level."

== Voices and characters ==
The following voice actors and celebrities provided the voices for the following characters in the TV show:

- Mel Blanc: Barney Rubble
- Daws Butler: King of Hearts, March Hare
- Henry Corden: Fred Flintstone (singing voice)
- Bill Dana: White Knight
- Sammy Davis Jr.: Cheshire Cat
- Doris Drew: Alice (singing voice)
- Zsa Zsa Gabor: Queen of Hearts
- Hedda Hopper: Hedda Hatter
- Harvey Korman: Mad Hatter
- Allan Melvin: Alice's father, Humphrey Dumpty
- Don Messick: Dormouse, Fluff
- Howard Morris: White Rabbit
- Alan Reed: Fred Flintstone (speaking voice)
- Janet Waldo: Alice (speaking voice)

Cast changes for the LP audio adaptation:

- Mel Blanc: March Hare (in addition to Barney Rubble)
- Daws Butler: Mad Hatter (but not the March Hare)
- Henry Corden: Fred Flintstone (speaking voice as well as singing voice)
- Scatman Crothers: Cheshire Cat
- Don Messick: White Rabbit (in addition to Fluff)
- Janet Waldo: Queen of Hearts (in addition to Alice's speaking voice)

== Musical numbers ==
- Life's a Game sung by Howard Morris (TV), Don Messick (LP) and Doris Drew (both).
- What’s a Nice Kid like You Doing in a Place like This? sung by Sammy Davis Jr. (TV), Scatman Crothers (LP)
- They’ll Never Split Us Apart sung by Mel Blanc and Henry Corden (TV and LP)
- Today's a Wonderful Day sung by Doris Drew and Bill Dana (TV and LP)
- I'm Home sung by Doris Drew (TV and LP)

Incidental music composed and arranged by Hoyt S. Curtin. Songs arranged by Marty Paitch [Marty Paich]. Music by Charles Strouse and lyrics by Lee Adams.

== Sources ==
- Woolery, George W. (1989). Animated TV specials : the complete directory to the first twenty-five years, 1962-1987. Internet Archive. Metuchen, N.J. : Scarecrow Press. ISBN 978-0-8108-2198-9.
