= The Funtastic World of Hanna-Barbera Arena Show =

- Genre: Television special Variety
- Written by: Bob Ogle; Harry Crane
- Directed by: Keith Mackenzie
- Presented by: Michael Landon
- Voices of: Sammy Davis Jr. Henry Corden; Casey Kasem; Allen Melvin; Don Messick; Janet Waldo; Arnold Stang
- Music by: Molly Ann Leikin
- Country of origin: United States
- Original language: English

Production
- Executive producer: Thomas W. Sarnoff
- Producer: George M. Cahan
- Running time: 90 minutes
- Production company: Hanna-Barbera Productions

Original release
- Network: NBC
- Release: June 25, 1981

The Funtastic World of Hanna-Barbera Arena Show is a 1981 live-action/animated variety television special produced by Hanna-Barbera Productions which premiered on NBC on June 25, 1981.

== Overview ==
The special, hosted by guest Michael Landon and his family, was broadcast from Perth Entertainment Centre in Perth, Australia and featured costumed Hanna-Barbera characters such as Fred Flintstone, Yogi Bear, Huckleberry Hound, Scooby-Doo and Top Cat on roller skates.

The show tells the story of the search for Dino, The Flintstones's pet dinosaur; in between segments, highlights include a huge volcano spewing red-hot disco dancers, life-size dancing billiard balls and dominoes, a 32-foot-long dancing skeleton, a phantom ghost ship and a spectacular three-ring circus.

== Voices ==
- Sammy Davis Jr. as The Cheshire Cat
- Henry Corden as Fred Flintstone
- Casey Kasem as Shaggy
- Allan Melvin as Magilla Gorilla
- Don Messick as Boo-Boo Bear, Muttley, Scooby-Doo
- Janet Waldo as Judy Jetson
- Arnold Stang as Top Cat
