= Energy: A National Issue =

- Written by: Gerard H. Baldwin
- Directed by: Gerard H. Baldwin
- Starring: Fred Flintstone; Wilma Flintstone
- Voices of: Alan Reed; Jean Vander Pyl; Henry Corden
- Narrated by: Charlton Heston
- Music by: Dean Elliott
- Country of origin: United States
- Original language: English

Production
- Producer: Ross M. Sutherland
- Cinematography: Jerry Smith; Frank Paiker
- Editor: Greg Watson
- Running time: 27 minutes
- Production company: Hanna-Barbera Productions

Original release
- Network: Syndication
- Release: November 22, 1977

Related
- The Flintstones on Ice; A Flintstone Christmas

Energy: A National Issue is a 1977 American animated educational film featuring characters from The Flintstones franchise and narrated by Charlton Heston. It was produced in 1976 by Hanna-Barbera Productions for the Center for Strategic and International Studies of Georgetown University and was also the final Flintstones production to feature Alan Reed as the voice of Fred Flintstone, recorded very shortly before his death in 1977. The film was distributed to schools on 16 mm format and was also broadcast that year in many areas as a syndicated television special.

== Plot ==
The film opens in prehistoric times where Fred Flintstone and his wife Wilma rely on a dwindling wood supply for their thermal and cooking needs. While their pet dinosaur Dino watches, Fred begins to chip away at black rocks, believing they could offer a power that is not immediately apparent by their inert state. Later, as Wilma is serving him an elaborate vegetarian lunch, Fred tells her he encountered a travelling stranger who agreed to accept the black rocks in exchange for a bow and arrow which Fred refers to as a "cat gut on a stick spear thrower" device. Fred uses this new device as a toy, unaware of its full potential.

Fred and Wilma are then propelled across the span of post-Stone Age civilization as the characters turn up in ancient Rome, the Renaissance, colonial America, post-Civil War America, and the suburban 1970s while addressing the difficulties in creating an energy self-sufficient society. Fred is featured in a musical sequence singing and dancing about energy efficiency, while Wilma is shown as a then-contemporary politician trying to appease an agitated rally crowd that is doubting her competency on energy-related issues.

As Fred and Wilma discover many facts about energy and the economy, viewers realize they must use our energy sources more efficiently to buy time to solve the problem.

== Voice cast ==
- Charlton Heston as Narrator
- Alan Reed as Fred Flintstone (singing provided by Henry Corden)
- Jean Vander Pyl as Wilma Flintstone

== Production credits ==
- Production Liaison: Sandra Granzow, Francis X. Murray, M. Jon Vondracek
- Technical Consultants: Jack H. Bridges, Joan Sandgren Bridges, Christa D.K. Dantzler, Roger W. Sant
- Produced by: Ross M. Sutherland
- Written and Directed by: Gerard H. Baldwin
- Voices: Alan Reed (Fred), Jean Vander Pyl (Wilma), Henry Corden (Fred's songs)
- Music: Dean Elliott
- Lyrics: John Bradford, Gerard H. Baldwin
- Design: Robert Dranko, Rosemary O'Connor, Walt Peregoy, Charles McElmurry, Roy Morita, Don Jurwich, Tom Knowles
- Backgrounds: Bob McIntosh, Gloria Wood, Eric Semones, Walt Peregoy
- Animation: Irv Spence, Oliver Callahan, Rudy Zamora, Fred Hellmich, Alan Zaslove, Bob Goe, Lee Mishkin, Frank Andrina, Mark Glamack, Fred Grable, Allen Wilsbach, Joel Seibel
- Assistant Director: Cindy Smith
- Sequence Director: Carl Urbano
- Editor: Greg Watson
- Camera: Jerry Smith, Frank Paiker
- Scene Planning: Cindy Smith, Evelyn Sherwood
- Sound: Dick Olson
- Ink & Paint: Billy Kerns
- Xerox: Star Wirth
- Graphics: Iraj Paran
- A HANNA-BARBERA PRODUCTION
- HANNA-BARBERA PRODUCTIONS, INC. ©MCMLXXVII All rights reserved.
- Distributed by AIMS Instructional Media Services, Inc. HOLLYWOOD, CALIFORNIA
