= The Flintstones: The Treasure of Sierra Madrock =

1994 video game

- North American cover art
- Developer: Taito
- Publisher: Taito
- Producer: Hanna-Barbera Cartoons
- Designers: S. Sakakibara; Midori Tokutomi
- Composers: N. Furukawa; Kennosuke Suemura
- Platform: Super Nintendo Entertainment System
- Release: 1994
- Genres: Action, platform
- Modes: Single-player, multiplayer

The Flintstones: The Treasure of Sierra Madrock (Japanese: フリントストーン トレジャー オブ シェラマッドロック) is a 1994 action-platform game developed and published by Taito for the Super Nintendo Entertainment System. The story of the game is generally based on the 1960s The Flintstones cartoon series. The title is a reference to the 1927 novel The Treasure of the Sierra Madre by B. Traven and its 1948 film adaptation.

In the opening story of the game, the Water Buffalos' leader decides to retire. As his last decree as Great Poobah, he creates a contest in which whoever finds the Treasure of Sierra Madrock will be his successor. In the game, Fred Flintstone and Barney Rubble must find the treasure before any other Buffalo member (or even their wives, Wilma and Betty). The game features passwords to continue the game from the highest level reached.

Players encounter a variety of enemies that must be dispatched using a club.

== Gameplay ==
Barney has encountered his wife Betty, who drags him back to a previous location on the map.

The game itself first involves a world map representing a themed set of worlds. Rolling the dice results in either Fred or Barney moving to the appropriate space on the board. Depending on the landed space, the player must clear a level in that particular world, defeat bosses, or enter shops, among other things. On some zones, Wilma and Betty appear and if any one of them manage to meet their respective husband, she will drag him some spaces back to an arbitrary location. Moving the players in the game is similar to playing a Japanese sugoroku board game.

The levels themselves are simple platformer segments. In these segments, the characters must traverse from left to right (and sometimes right to left), while avoiding hazards and defeating dinosaurs, Water Buffalo members or other creatures. In order to defeat enemies, Fred and Barney use a wood club. There is an overall difficulty level of "medium" to the game; providing frequent breaks from the low-difficulty horizontal scrolling action stages with mini-games that have a high level of difficulty. There are also power-ups such as brontoburger (energy) and clams (in-game currency). In a few cases, a power-up is a trap in which the Cavemouse appears, being followed by Dino. Unlike the TV show, Dino actually hurts the player if he is hit by him.

The earlier zones in the game can only be cleared by first defeating specific Water Buffalo members (most of which appeared at some point in the cartoon series) by winning them in a race located at a stadium. Races use the game's RAM to simulate variables like forward speed, leaning angle, maximum terrain speed, and vertical speed. These events must be found as their items are crucial to the success of the quest. If any character goes to the stadium, the race can be practiced. The person who operates the racing mini-game will give an item to both Fred and Barney after defeating him, so that they can go the next world.

The types of worlds involved include Bedrock, Snowrock (an ice world), and Magmarock (a fire world), amongst other worlds present in the game. Within each world are mini-game challenges that allow players to experience the diversity of that world.

== Reception ==
Reception

Aggregate score
Aggregator	Score
GameRankings	64.83% (3 reviews)

Review score
Publication	Score
Electronic Gaming Monthly	8/10, 7/10, 7/10, 7/10

The game received "mixed or average" reviews. GameRankings rated the game a 64.83%. GamePro however, gave the game a negative review, summarizing, "Intermediate gamers will find this game repetitive and way too easy. Everyone else will find themselves leaving the cave for some fresh air rather than being stuck with this humdrum rock-knocker."
