= The Flintstones (1993 video game) =

1993 video game

- North American box art
- Developers: Taito; Santos
- Publishers: NA/JP: Taito; EU: Sega
- Designers: T. Toriumi; K. Sato; Y. Kasai; Junko Oda; Minako Sahara; T. Kohno; M. Takahashi
- Programmer: T. Ariga
- Platform: Sega Genesis
- Release: NA: April 1993; EU: August 6, 1993; JP: November 19, 1993
- Genre: Platform
- Mode: Single-player

The Flintstones (Note: The Flintstones (フリントストーン; "Flintstone")) is a platform game for the Sega Genesis, based on the Hanna-Barbera animated television series The Flintstones. The game was published in 1993 by Taito in North America and Japan while Sega published the game in Europe.

== Gameplay ==
The Flintstones is a platform game with 24 levels. The player controls Fred Flintstone, who must complete seven tasks, which include locating his daughter Pebbles, and a necklace belonging to his wife Wilma. The player is capable of jumping, and uses a club as a weapon against various enemies throughout the game.

== Reception ==
Reception

Review score
Publication	Score
Sega Zone	75/100

The Flintstones received mixed reviews. Back in 1993, reviewers were more forgiving, with magazines like Sega Force awarding it a 7.2/10, and Mega Fun a 6.5/10. More recently, gamers have been more critical; Jeuxvideo.com awarded the game a 13/20 (6.5/10) while Sega-16.com gave the game a 5/10. Power Unlimited gave the game a review score of 80% writing: "The Flintstones is one of the more fun games of its kind. The animations may be bad, but they are funny. As befits a good platformer, the levels are varied, and Fred Flintstone can do a lot of different moves."
