= Henry Corden =

American actor (1920–2005)

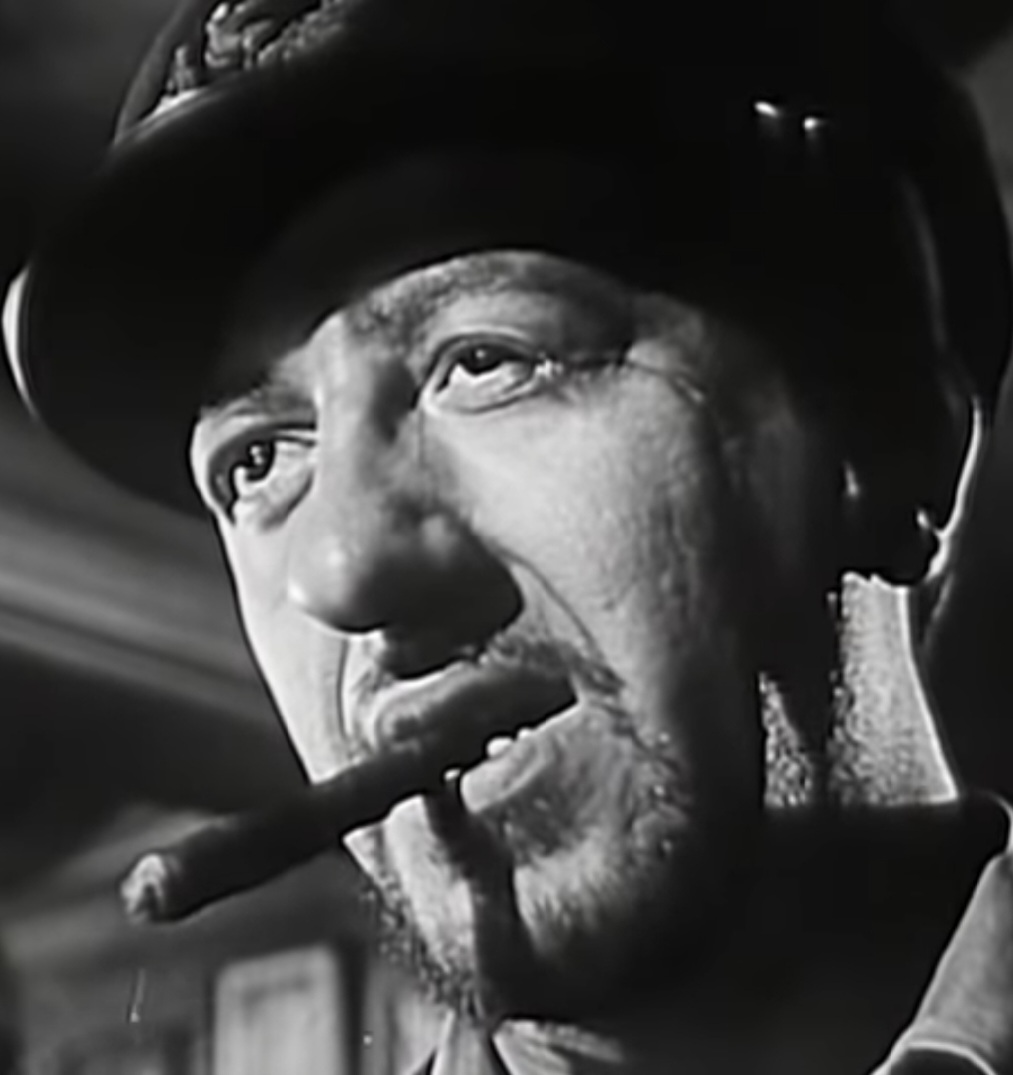
- Corden in Behave Yourself! (1951)
- Born: Henry Cohen; January 6, 1920; Montreal, Quebec, Canada
- Died: May 19, 2005 (aged 85); Sherman Oaks, California, U.S.
- Resting place: San Fernando Mission Cemetery
- Occupation: Actor
- Years active: 1947–2005
- Spouses: Thelma Corden (m. 1942; div. 1969) Shirley W. Cytron (m. 1970; div. 1979) Charlotte R. Colton Diamond (m. 1984; died 1993) Angelina Corden (m. 1995)
- Children: 2

Henry Corden (né Cohen; January 6, 1920 – May 19, 2005) was a Canadian-born American actor, best known for assuming the voice of Fred Flintstone full-time after the death of Alan Reed in 1977, starting with the syndicated weekday series Fred Flintstone and Friends, for which he provided voice-overs on brief bumper clips shown in between segments. His official debut as Fred Flintstone was in a 1965 Hanna-Barbera record, Fred Flintstone and Barney Rubble in Songs from Mary Poppins, and he also provided the singing voice for Reed in the 1966 theatrical film The Man Called Flintstone and the Hanna-Barbera specials Alice in Wonderland or What's a Nice Kid like You Doing in a Place like This? (1966) and Energy: A National Issue (1977).

== Early years ==
Corden was born January 6, 1920, in Montreal to Jewish immigrants Max and Emma Cohen. His father was a meat curer who had been born in Romania; his mother was originally from Russia. The family moved to the Bronx, New York when Corden was a child and he arrived in Hollywood in the 1940s.

== Career ==
Corden appeared on the stage in Los Angeles, including a 1947 production of The Message. His film career included The System (1952), where he played a near-sighted gangster named Specs. Corden thought it would be the first time in 25 films he could wear his glasses and see while he was acting, but the lenses gave off too much reflection and he had to substitute them for plain glass after one day of shooting.

Corden's obituary in the Tampa Bay Times noted, "With his deep voice, jet-black hair and ethnic looks, Corden was frequently tapped to play heavies in films and on television."[2] He can be seen in such live-action films as The Secret Life of Walter Mitty, The Black Castle, Abbott and Costello in the Foreign Legion and The Ten Commandments. He also appeared in dozens of TV shows, including Hogan's Heroes (in five episodes), Dragnet, Perry Mason, Peter Gunn, McHale's Navy (in five episodes), Gunsmoke, The Mary Tyler Moore Show and was a regular on The Jerry Lewis Show. Corden also played landlord Henry Babbitt on The Monkees and Mr. Haskell, the owner of an ice cream parlor, in an episode of The Brady Bunch.

Before Reed's death, Corden had been used as Reed's replacement when Fred Flintstone had to sing because Reed could not sing in pitch. Corden gave his voice to a number of Hanna-Barbera productions besides The Flintstones, including The Jetsons, Josie and the Pussycats, The Atom Ant Show, and Paw Rugg on The Hillbilly Bears, The New Tom & Jerry Show and Jonny Quest. Corden also gave voice to the wizard Gemini and Ookla the Mokk in Ruby-Spears Productions' Thundarr the Barbarian as well as the Gorilla General Urko in DePatie-Freleng Enterprises' Return to the Planet of the Apes. He voiced Arnie Barkley, the Archie Bunker-inspired patriarch of DePatie-Freleng's The Barkleys, in 1972.

== Personal life ==
Corden was married four times. His first wife was Thelma Corden, from 1942 to 1969; together they had two children. He and his second wife Shirley W. Cytron were married from 1970 to 1979. After his divorce from Cytron, he married his third wife Charlotte R. Colton Diamond in 1984; they remained married until her death in 1993. Corden's fourth and final marriage was to Angelina Corden in 1995, and they remained married until Corden's death in 2005.

== Death ==
Corden died of emphysema at Sherman Oaks Hospital in Sherman Oaks, California on May 19 2005, at the age of 85. Corden's wife of nine years, Angelina, was with him at the time.

His interment was at San Fernando Mission Cemetery.

== Filmography ==
=== Film ===
- The Secret Life of Walter Mitty (1947) as Hendrick
- Bride of Vengeance (1949) as Scout
- Wild Weed (1949) as Hugo the club manager
- Abbott and Costello in the Foreign Legion (1950) as Ibrim
- The Asphalt Jungle (1950) as William Dolden
- Hiawatha (1952) as Ottobang
- Abbott and Costello Meet Dr. Jekyll and Mr. Hyde (1953) as Actor in Javanese Costume (uncredited)
- The Band Wagon (1953) as Orchestra Conductor (uncredited)
- Phantom of the Rue Morgue (1954) as Detective Mignaud (uncredited)
- King Richard and the Crusaders (1954) as King Philip of France
- The Egyptian (1954) as Hittite Officer (uncredited)
- Jupiter's Darling (1955) as Carthalo
- Jump Into Hell (1955) as Major Lamblin (uncredited)
- Lust for Life (1956) as Waiter (uncredited)
- The Ten Commandments (1956) as Sheik of Sinai
- The Shadow on the Window (1957) as Louie (uncredited)
- Cry Tough (1959) as Mr. Fuente (uncredited)
- The Adventures of Huckleberry Finn (1960) as Mate (uncredited)
- Blueprint for Robbery (1961) as Preacher Doc
- When the Clock Strikes (1961) as Cady
- Tammy Tell Me True (1961) as Captain Armand
- Island of Love (1963) (uncredited)
- Strange Bedfellows (1965) as Sheik's Interpreter (uncredited)
- The Family Jewels (1965) as Gasoline Truck Driver (uncredited)
- McHale's Navy Joins the Air Force (1965) as NKVD deputy
- Alice in Wonderland or What's a Nice Kid like You Doing in a Place like This? (1966, TV Movie) as Fred Flintstone (singing voice)
- The Man Called Flintstone (1966) as Fred Flintstone (singing voice)
- Made in Paris (1966) as Bartender (uncredited)
- The Singing Nun (1966) as Truck Driver (uncredited)
- Frankie and Johnny (1966) as Gypsy (uncredited)
- Don't Worry, We'll Think of a Title (1966) as Professor Lerowski
- Hook, Line & Sinker (1969) as Kenyon Hammercher
- Which Way to the Front? (1970) as Gangster (uncredited)
- The ABC Saturday Superstar Movie (1972, TV Movie) as Yogi's Ark Lark - Paw Rugg / First Truck Driver
- C.H.O.M.P.S. (1979) as Monster (dog)
- Modern Problems (1981) as Dubrovnik
- Omnisphere (1983) as Neon City: Screen 1 voice (voice)
- The Greatest Adventure: Stories from the Bible (1986, Video short, episode - Daniel and the Lion's Den)
- The Jetsons Meet the Flintstones (1987, TV Movie) as Fred Flintstone
- Beetle Bailey (1989, TV Movie) as Sergeant Snorkel
- I Yabba-Dabba Do! (1993, TV Movie) as Fred Flintstone
- Hollyrock-a-Bye Baby (1993, TV Movie) as Fred Flintstone
- The 10th Annual Television Academy Hall of Fame (1994, TV Movie documentary) as himself
- A Flintstones Christmas Carol (1994, TV Movie) as Fred Flintstone

=== Television ===
- The Life of Riley (1949) - Delivery man
- Terry and the Pirates (1952) - Singdee (1952)
- Adventures of Superman (1952) - Legbo/William Johnson
- Alfred Hitchcock Presents (1957) (Season 2 Episode 31: "The Night the World Ended") - Boarder
- Official Detective (1957) - Reagan
- Zorro (1958) - León (uncredited)
- Peter Gunn (1958) - Vladimir
- Gunsmoke (1958) - Butler
- Richard Diamond, Private Detective (1958) - Turk Stell
- Wagon Train (1958–1960) - Tex Hall, Black Feather, Phelan
- The Detectives (1960) - Roland Potter
- Have Gun - Will Travel (1960) - Prince Alexei Romanov
- Bonanza (1961) - Bookie
- The Real McCoys (1961) - Mr. Ramirez
- Mister Ed (1961) - The Great Mordini
- Wagon Train (1961) - Frank
- Straightaway (1962) – Episode "A Moment in the Sun" – Gabe
- The Real McCoys (1962) - Pedro
- Maverick (1962) - Professor Reynard
- Mister Ed (1963) - Episode "Taller Than She" - The Blacksmith
- Bob Hope Presents the Chrysler Theatre (1963)
- The New Phil Silvers Show (1964) – Episode "Keep Cool" – Gomez
- Jonny Quest (1964–65) - Various
- The Flintstones (1964–66) - Mr. Loudrock, Baron Von Rickenrock, Additional voices
- The Secret Squirrel Show (1965) - Additional voices
- I Dream of Jeannie (1965) - Jeannie's Father
- Rawhide (1965) - General Velasquez
- Hogan's Heroes (1965) - General Von Kaplow
- The Atom Ant Show (1965–1966) - Paw Rugg
- Family Affair (1966) - Alam
- Bewitched (1966) - Muldoon
- Daniel Boone (1966) - Peter Mornay
- The John Forsythe Show (1966) - Count Beppo
- Hogan's Heroes (1966, 1968, 1971) - Antonovich, Blue Baron, Dr. von Bornemann
- The Monkees (1966–1967) – Babbit, Blauner
- Fantastic Four (1967) - Attuma, Molecule Man
- The F.B.I. (1967) - Organ Grinder
- It Takes a Thief (1968) - Director
- The Land of the Giants (1968) - Janitor in "The Creed"
- The Bob Hope Specials (1968–1971)
- Get Smart (1969) - Big Eddie Little, Mondo
- The Banana Splits Adventures Hour (1969) - Bez
- Harlem Globetrotters (1970) - Additional voices (uncredited)
- Ironside (1970) - Lecturer
- The Mary Tyler Moore Show (1970, 1972) - Charlie's voice, Harry
- The Barkleys (1972) - Arnie Barkley
- The New Scooby-Doo Movies (1972–1973) Redcoat Ghost, Additional voices
- Josie and the Pussycats in Outer Space (1972) - Additional Voices
- Yogi's Gang (1973) - Paw Rugg, Dr. Bigot
- Butch Cassidy and the Sundance Kids (1973) - Additional Voices
- The Brady Bunch (1973) - Mr. Haskell
- The Streets of San Francisco (1974) - Weiss
- These Are the Days (1974) - Additional Voices
- Return to the Planet of the Apes (1975) -General Urko, Tallyho the Hunter
- Harry O (1975) - Sidney Hacktel
- The Tom & Jerry/Grape Ape/Mumbly Show (1975) - Additional voices
- The Mumbly Cartoon Show (1976) - Additional voices
- Dynomutt, Dog Wonder (1976–1977) - Mr. Hyde, Willie the Weasel, The Prophet
- Energy: A National Issue (1977) - Fred Flintstone (Singing voice)
- Captain Caveman and the Teen Angels (1977–1980) - Additional voices
- CB Bears (1977) - Bump
- Fred Flintstone and Friends (1977–1978) - Fred Flintstone
- Scooby's All-Star Laff-A-Lympics (1977) - Fred Flintstone
- The Skatebirds (1977) - Additional Voices
- A Flintstone Christmas (1977) - Fred Flintstone
- Hanna-Barbera's All-Star Comedy Ice Revue (1978) - Fred Flintstone
- The Three Robonic Stooges (1978) - Hercules, Pierre LeSly
- The Flintstones: Little Big League (1978) - Fred Flintstone
- The New Fantastic Four (1978) - Attuma
- Challenge of the Superfriends (1978) - Dr. Varga, Brain Creature Leader, Torahna
- Yogi's Space Race (1978) - Sheriff Muletrain Pettigrew
- Galaxy Goof-Ups (1978) - Additional voices
- Buford and the Galloping Ghost (1979) - Sheriff Muletrain Pettigrew
- The New Fred and Barney Show (1979) - Fred Flintstone
- Welcome Back, Kotter (1979) - Sidney Fishbein
- Hollywood Squares (1979) - Guest Appearance
- The Flintstones Meet Rockula and Frankenstone (1979) - Fred Flintstone
- Fred and Barney Meet the Thing (1979) - Fred Flintstone
- Fred and Barney Meet the Shmoo (1979–1980) - Fred Flintstone
- Mighty Man and Yukk (1979) - Goldteeth, Kragg the Conqueror
- Fangface and Fangpuss (1979) - episode - The Defiant Casablanca Giant - Abdul the Giant
- Super Friends (1980) - Additional voices
- Thundarr the Barbarian (1980–1981) - Ookla the Mok
- The Fonz and the Happy Days Gang (1980) - Additional Voices
- The Flintstone Comedy Show (1980–1982) - Fred Flintstone
- The Flintstones' New Neighbors (1980) - Fred Flintstone
- The Flintstones: Fred's Final Fling (1980) - Fred Flintstone, Monkey #2, Turtle #2
- Spider-Man (1981) - Johann's Father
- Goldie Gold and Action Jack (1981) - Additional voices
- The Kwicky Koala Show (1981) - Additional voices
- The Smurfs (1981) - Additional voices
- No Man's Valley (1981) - Chief
- The Richie Rich/Scooby-Doo Show (1981) - Additional voices
- The Flintstones: Wind-Up Wilma (1981) - Fred Flintstone
- The Flintstones: Jogging Fever (1981) - Fred Flintstone
- Jokebook (1982) - Additional voices
- Here Comes Garfield (1982) - Hubert
- Yogi Bear's All Star Comedy Christmas Caper (1982) - Fred Flintstone, Policeman, Security Guard #1
- The Flintstone Funnies (1982) - Fred Flintstone
- Alvin and the Chipmunks (1983) - Additional Voices
- Mister T (1983) - Additional voices
- The New Scooby and Scrappy-Doo Show (1983) - Additional voices
- Strong Kids, Safe Kids (1984) - Fred Flintstone
- Challenge of the GoBots (1984) - Additional voices
- Scary Scooby Funnies (1984–1985) - Additional voices
- Galtar and the Golden Lance (1985) - Additional voices
- The Berenstain Bears Show (1985) - Additional Male voices
- The Jetsons (1985) - Elroy in Wonderland
- The Flintstones' 25th Anniversary Celebration (1986) - Fred Flintstone
- The Flintstone Kids (1986–1987) - Edna Flintstone, Ed Flintstone
- The Video Adventures of Clifford the Big Red Dog (1988) - Various voices
- The Flintstone Kids' "Just Say No" Special (1988) - Ed Flintstone, Edna Flintstone
- Hanna-Barbera's 50th: A Yabba Dabba Doo Celebration (1989) - Fred Flintstone
- A Flintstone Family Christmas (1993) - Fred Flintstone
- The Simpsons (1994) - Fred Flintstone
- Garfield and Friends (1994) - Various voices
- The Flintstones: Wacky Inventions (1994) - Fred Flintstone
- Dino: Stay Out! (1995) - Fred Flintstone
- The Weird Al Show (1997) - Fred Flintstone

=== Video games ===
- The Flintstones: Bedrock Bowling (2000) - Fred Flintstone

=== Theme parks ===
- The Funtastic World of Hanna-Barbera (1990) - Fred Flintstone
