= The Flintstone Kids =

American animated television series

- Genre: Comedy
- Created by: William Hanna; Joseph Barbera
- Directed by: Art Davis; Don Lusk; Carl Urbano (season 1); Rudy Zamora (season 1); Connie Dufau (season 2); John Kimball (season 2); Paul Sommer (season 2)
- Voices of: Charlie Adler; Mel Blanc; Susan Blu; Hamilton Camp; Henry Corden; Julie Dees; Elizabeth Lyn Fraser; Scott Menville; Bumper Robinson; Marilyn Schreffler; B.J. Ward; Lennie Weinrib; Frank Welker
- Narrated by: Kenneth Mars (Captain Caveman and Son)
- Theme music composer: Hoyt Curtin
- Opening theme: "The Flintstone Kids"
- Composer: Hoyt Curtin
- Countries of origin: United States; Poland
- Original language: English
- No. of seasons: 2
- No. of episodes: 36 (76 segments)

Production
- Executive producers: William Hanna; Joseph Barbera
- Producer: Kay Wright
- Editor: Gil Iverson
- Running time: 23–24 minutes (3–11 minutes per segment)
- Production company: Hanna-Barbera Productions (Note: Animation for seven episodes of Season 2 outsourced to Studio Filmów Rysunkowych.)

Original release
- Network: ABC
- Release: September 13, 1986 – November 14, 1987

Related
- The Flintstone Funnies; Dino: Stay Out!; The Flintstones; The Flintstone Kids' "Just Say No" Special

The Flintstone Kids is an American animated television series produced by Hanna-Barbera. It is an alternative incarnation of the studio's original animated series The Flintstones. The series depicts juvenile versions of the main characters from the original show. It aired from September 13, 1986, to November 14, 1987, on ABC. It was the first Flintstones series not to have a laugh track. Mel Blanc is the only cast member of the original series to be featured in this series, reprising the voice of Dino.

== Overview ==
The program follows the adventures of Fred Flintstone, Barney Rubble, Wilma Slaghoople, Betty McBricker and Dino as tweens. They share their preadolescence with their friends Nate Slate (Fred's future boss) and Philo Quartz, as well as the very pretty, popular girl Dreamchip Gemstone, who, much to Wilma's dismay, has a big crush on Fred. They also deal with their bully Rocky Ratrock and his Badrotten Bunch consisting of Tarpit Tommy, Flab Slab, Janet Granite, and Rocky's dogasaurus Stalagbite.

The Flintstone Kids was intended only to run for two seasons, and was retired in favor of another Hanna-Barbera series that similarly de-aged its core cast, A Pup Named Scooby-Doo. The sudden failure of The New Adventures of Beany and Cecil led to reruns of The Flintstone Kids being re-added to the ABC Saturday morning schedule in late 1988.

== Plot and segments ==
This series featured the following segments:

=== The Flintstone Kids ===
The "main" segment of the show. It would either be a single half-hour episode (only in the first season) or a segment.

=== Flintstone Funnies ===
Freddy, Barney, Wilma and Betty dream of exciting fantasy adventures with most of them being parodies of different films. This segment was dropped in the second season.

=== Dino's Dilemmas ===
The adventures and misadventures of Freddy's pet dinosaur Dino.

=== Captain Caveman and Son ===
The adventures of Captain Caveman (returning from Captain Caveman and the Teen Angels) with his son Cavey Jr. as they fight bad guys like the evil genius Mr. Bad. This segment was actually a "show within a show" whereby Captain Caveman and Son is a TV show watched by the main characters at Fred's home, where the "fourth wall" is broken frequently.

== Episodes ==
The segments indicate in colors by which characters starred in them:

- Blue = The Flintstone Kids (25 segments)
- Teal = Flintstone Funnies (13 segments)
- Magenta = Dino's Dilemmas (19 segments)
- Red = Captain Caveman and Son (19 segments)

=== Series overview ===
Season	Segments	Episodes	Originally released	
Season	Segments	Episodes	First released	Last released
1	54	26	September 13, 1986	December 13, 1986
2	22	10	September 12, 1987	November 14, 1987

=== Season 1 (1986) ===
No. overall	No. in season	Title	Written by	Original release date
1	1	"The Great Freddini"	Story by : Glenn Leopold; Teleplay by : Don Nelson and Arthur Alsberg	September 13, 1986
Fred learns magic to prepare for the school's talent show.
2a	2a	"Frankenstone"	Mel Gilden and John K. Ludin	September 13, 1986
Rocky wrecks Wilma's sister's doll, and it is up to Fred to fix it. He imagines he's Dr. Frankenstone and creates a monster that wants to make Wilma his bride. Note: This episode is a parody of Frankenstein.
2b	2b	"Yard Wars"	Lane Raichert	September 13, 1986
When Dino has to babysit Wilma's pet Saberkitty, he has to do what ever it takes to keep Fang safe.
2c	2c	"Freezy Does It"	Lane Raichert	September 13, 1986
Cavey Jr. becomes Captain Caveman's sidekick after his birthday party and helps his dad fight Dr. Icemare: a weatherman who is stealing rock-frigerators to make Bedrock cold.
3	3	"Heroes for Hire"	Story by : Jim Ryan; Teleplay by : Arthur Alsberg and Don Nelson	September 20, 1986
While at the Flintstone house, Barney answers the phone, winning a trip to the Captain Caveman Show. Fred becomes jealous because he was the one who told Barney to pick up the phone. Fred sets out to prove himself as a hero to the town so he can get the prize instead of Barney.
4a	4a	"Indiana Flintstone"	Kent Zbornak	September 20, 1986
Fred and Barney sneak to an Indiana Stones exhibit during a visit to the museum and pretend to be Indiana and his trusty sidekick. Note: This episode is a parody of Raiders of the Lost Ark.
4b	4b	"Dreamchip's Car Wash"	Lane Raichert	September 20, 1986
Dreamchip wants to test her new dog-washer on Dino, and Fred agrees until Dreamchip calls Dino a "mutt".
4c	4c	"Invasion of the Mommy Snatchers"	Lane Raichert	September 20, 1986
A two-headed alien child named Riff and Raff are stealing the mothers of Earth in their UFO. Captain Caveman and Cavey Jr. infiltrate the ship to find out their plot.
5	5	"The Bad News Brontos"	Barry Blitzer	September 27, 1986
The gang form a baseball team of their own.
6a	6a	"Rubble Without a Cause"	Wayne Kaatz	September 27, 1986
After looking at the stars in a telescope at night, Barney imagines himself in a space sci-fi movie where Darth Ratrock has captured Princess Betty. Note: This episode is a parody of Star Wars.
6b	6b	"Dressed Up Dino"	Lane Raichert	September 27, 1986
Dino is forced to play dress up and tea party with the little girls.
6c	6c	"The Ditto Master"	Lane Raichert	September 27, 1986
Captain Caveman and Cavey Jr. face off against Ditto Master, a supervillain with a machine that enables him to duplicate himself and other things.
7	7	"Dusty Disappears"	John Bradford and Denis Higgins	October 4, 1986
While babysitting Dusty Rubble, Fred and Barney finally get him to sleep with help from Wilma and Betty. Mr. and Mrs. Rubble think the boys did a great job, and they make Fred and Barney take him to the carnival. While there, Dusty starts being a pain to Fred and Barney and disappears on them.
8a	8a	"Sugar and Spies"	Story by : L. Lynn Hart and Felicia Maliani; Teleplay by : Felicia Maliani	October 4, 1986
After seeing a spy movie and on an errand to get the Bronto Burgers for Jean McBricker, Freddy, Barney, Wilma, and Betty pretend to be agents where they must recover the stolen Brontoburgers from Agent Dino 07 who is working for Dr. Rocky No-No. Note: This episode is a parody of the James Bond franchise.
8b	8b	"The Vet"	Lane Raichert	October 4, 1986
Dino thinks he's going to the vet after overhearing a conversation between Fred and his father.
8c	8c	"I Was a Teenage Grown-Up"	Lane Raichert	October 4, 1986
Mr. Bad uses Grown Up Gas to make kids act they're all grown up. It soon affects Cavey Jr., making it difficult for Captain Caveman to stop Mr. Bad.
9	9	"Poor Little Rich Girl"	Coslough Johnson	October 11, 1986
Dreamchip's birthday is coming up and her butler Cragmire wants her to celebrate it alone due to her parents being out of town. This causes her friends to infiltrate her mansion by evading the security system that Ed Flintstone installed. The house is also infiltrated by Rocky Ratrock's group.
10a	10a	"Freddy in the Big House"	Kent Zbornak	October 11, 1986
Rocky frames Fred for playing football in the classroom, causing his teacher Ms. Rockbottom to make Fred write "I Will Not Play Football in Class" 100 times. During this time, Fred imagines that he is in prison after he was framed for different crimes by Rocky. Now he must break out with help from Barney and expose Rocky while gaining unlikely help from undercover police officers Wilma and Betty.
10b	10b	"The Butcher Shoppe"	Lane Raichert	October 11, 1986
Dino will do anything for some of the butcher's sausage. But when a little old lady drops a ham outside the shop, Dino's conscience won't let him take it.
10c	10c	"Grime & Punishment"	Bill Matheny	October 11, 1986
The Trash Man is making Bedrock all trashy and it is up to Captain Caveman and Cavey Jr. to stop him and clean up Bedrock. Note: This is the episode Freddy & Barney won their appearance on in "Heroes for Hire".
11	11	"The Rock Concert That Rocked Freddy"	Barry Blitzer	October 18, 1986
Freddy promises everyone tickets to the Brick Stonespring concert. When Freddy is unable to get the tickets, he and Barney have to do whatever it takes to get everyone into the concert.
12a	12a	"Bedrock P.I.s"	John K. Ludin	October 18, 1986
Fred and Barney become private eye detectives where they look for Wilma's pet sabretooth cat Fang. Note: This episode is a parody of Dick Tracy.
12b	12b	"Fred's Mechanical Dog"	Lane Raichert	October 18, 1986
Dino is worried when Freddy gets a mechanical dog, but learns that his fears are unfounded when the dog turns out to be less than Freddy expected.
12c	12c	"A Tale of Too Silly"	Troy Schmidt, Jeff Holder, and Lane Raichert	October 18, 1986
Yuckster steals eggs, flours, and Cowasauruses to make a pie large enough to throw at the entire city.
13	13	"Curse of the Gemstone Diamond"	Dennis Marks	October 25, 1986
A doppelganger of Fred steals Dreamchip Gemstone's precious diamond, spoiling the Halloween party of the kids at Dreamchip's mansion.
14a	14a	"Princess Wilma"	Terry Shakespeare and Sue Shakespeare	October 25, 1986
Wilma has a cold and cannot go to the Bedrock Mall with Betty. While she is resting, she imagines herself as a princess who gets captured by Rocky Ratrock.
14b	14b	"The Dino Diet"	Lane Raichert	October 25, 1986
Dino gained 50 pounds, so Freddy is forced to keep him on a strict diet. Though Dino doesn't stick to it.
14c	14c	"To Baby or Not to Baby"	Story by : Lane Raichert; Teleplay by : David Schwartz	October 25, 1986
Mr. Sciencedome is tired of Captain Caveman's show taking away his television viewers, so he creates a Fountain of Youth formula disguised as a glass of lemonade which turns Captain Caveman into a baby. This becomes too much for Cavey Jr. to handle as he drags his de-aged dad to Mr. Sciencedome's show in order to get him to restore Captain Caveman to his rightful age.
15a	15a	"I Think That I Shall Never See Barney Rubble As a Tree"	Dennis Marks	November 1, 1986
Fred misinterprets a discussion he overhears about diseased trees and starts to believe that Barney is sick.
15b	15b	"Dino Come Home"	Dennis Marks	November 1, 1986
Freddy's class goes on a camping trip and Dino stows away. When Freddy discovers Dino, Dino gets frightened and runs away.
16a	16a	"Monster from the Tar Pits"	Wayne Kaatz	November 1, 1986
Fred, Barney, Wilma, and Betty imagine that they are filmmakers who travel to an island and encounter a monster that dwells in the tar pits. When they bring the Monster from the Tar Pits to Bedrock for display, Rocky sets it free and it goes on a rampage. Note: This episode is a parody of King Kong.
16b	16b	"What Price Fleadom"	Lane Raichert	November 1, 1986
Dino gets a flea on his back and tries whatever he can to get it to leave.
16c	16c	"Hero Today, Gone Tomorrow"	Bill Matheny	November 1, 1986
A new superhero named Perfect Man is outdoing Captain Caveman by making Bedrock perfect. He soon makes it too perfect, compelling Captain Caveman and Cavey Jr. to stop him.
17	17	"The Fugitives"	Wayne Kaatz and Kent Zbornak	November 8, 1986
Fred and Barney lose control of Dino who accidentally steals an old pillow belonging to Queen Og from a museum. They make an effort to redeem themselves by catching the thieves.
18a	18a	"The Twilight Stone"	Mary Jo Ludin	November 8, 1986
The gang talks about what they want to be when they grow up while out on a picnic. Fred imagines that he runs a restaurant, Betty imagines that she's a star, Barney imagines that he's a beach hero, and Wilma imagines that she's married to Freddy. Note: This episode is a parody of The Twilight Zone.
18b	18b	"The Terror Within"	Lane Raichert	November 8, 1986
The Flintstones hear a noise in the garage and send cowardly Dino in after the burglar. Discovering that the "thief" is only a tiny mouse, Dino heroically chases him away.
18c	18c	"Day of the Villains"	Lane Raichert	November 8, 1986
Mr. Bad assembles Dr. Icemare, Trash Man, Ditto Master, Yuckster, and other villains of Bedrock as part of a plan to eliminate their mutual enemy Captain Caveman once and for all. As Captain Caveman and Cavey Jr. do their errands, the villains try to eliminate Captain Caveman and Cavey Jr. with comical results.
19	19	"Freddy's Rocky Road to Karate"	Barry Blitzer	November 15, 1986
Rocky challenges the Jr. Water Buffaloes to a karate match. They think they're gonna lose until Ms. Rockbottom assigns a Japanese foreign exchange student Tamoco.
20a	20a	"Betty's Big Break"	Sue Shakespeare	November 15, 1986
Betty becomes a big star after she replaces a sick Dreamchip for the spring pageant that is showing a scene from The Lizard of Oz.
20b	20b	"Revenge of the Bullied"	Lane Raichert	November 15, 1986
When big bully dog Spike terrorizes Dino and Stalagbite, the two pets join forces to teach Spike a lesson.
20c	20c	"Curse of the Reverse"	Lane Raichert	November 15, 1986
Mr. Bad uses his Backwards Beam to turn everything in Bedrock on its head, making Captain Caveman and Cavey Jr. wanted criminals in the process.
21	21	"Barney's Moving Experience"	Coslough Johnson	November 22, 1986
After Fred breaks Barney's bike, Barney moves out of Bedrock and Fred's dad gives him a part-time job.
22a	22a	"Dino Goes Hollyrock"	Wayne Kaatz	November 22, 1986
After Dino sees a dino dog like himself on the screen at the movies, he becomes a big star in Hollyrock where even works to save his leading lady Pearl from Rocky Ratrock. Note: Dino talks in his fantasy during the episode.
22b	22b	"The Chocolate Chip Catastrophe"	Lane Raichert	November 22, 1986
Despite a warning from Edna, Dino attempts to reach for a batch of chocolate chip cookies when Edna leaves the kitchen to answer the phone. Dino upsets the table, sending the cookies and batter flying all over the kitchen. He races to make another batch and clean the kitchen before Edna discovers the mess.
22c	22c	"Capt. Caveman's First Adventure"	Lane Raichert	November 22, 1986
Captain Caveman flashes back to his childhood to when his mother gives him his club around the time when Billy Bad (a younger version of Mr. Bad) attempts to make school less fun with the help of his Bore-Bots.
23a	23a	"The Little Visitor"	Dennis Marks	December 6, 1986
When Fred's parents say they're expecting someone, Fred thinks they're going to have another baby.
23b	23b	"Grandpa for Loan"	Dennis Marks	December 6, 1986
The father-son picnic is coming up. When Barney's father is unavailable, Fred loans him his grandfather as Ed warns Fred that he can be sneaky.
24a	24a	"Philo's Invention"	Kent Zbornak	December 6, 1986
When Rocky tries to steal Philo's science project, Philo daydreams that he's a brilliant toy inventor. Everything goes well in his fantasy until rival toymaker Rocky kidnaps Philo and forces him to build nasty toys.
24b	24b	"Watchdog Blues"	Lane Raichert	December 6, 1986
Ed and Edna Flintstone reluctantly allow their pet Dino to sleep in the house every night, but he proves his worth when a burglar breaks in.
24c	24c	"Leave It to Mother"	Lane Raichert	December 6, 1986
Captain Caveman's mother is coming to visit at the same time a hair blob created by Mr. Bad attacks the Amrock Hair Supply factory. When Captain Caveman and Cavey Jr. are captured following the hair blob's destruction, it is up to Grandma Cavemom to stop Mr. Bad before he can dip them in hair removal.
25	25	"Freddy's First Crush"	Coslough Johnson	December 13, 1986
Fred has a crush on a substitute teacher in school.
26a	26a	"Bedrock'n Roll"	Terry Shakespeare	December 13, 1986
The gang imagine themselves as rock stars and start a "Lemon Aid" concert hosted by Rock Dees in order to raise money while thwarting building developer Rocky Ratrock's plans to turn the Big Lemon Youth Center into Ratrockland.
26b	26b	"Captain Cavepuppy"	Lane Raichert	December 13, 1986
After Stalagbite terrorizes Dino, he daydreams that he's Captain Cavepuppy. Later, Dino summons the courage to help the kids confront Rocky and Stalagbite.
26c	26c	"Greed It and Weep"	Bill Matheny and Lane Raichert	December 13, 1986
Piggy McGrabit (the richest and greediest man in Bedrock) uses his Money Magnet invented by his scientist to steal all of Bedrock's money. Captain Caveman and Cavey Jr. must stop Piggy McGrabit before everyone ends up broke.

=== Season 2 (1987) ===
Four of these episodes contains a new short followed by repeats of two shorts from season 1.

No. overall	No. in season	Title	Written by	Original release date
27a	1a	"The Flintstone Fake Ache"	Story by : Lane Raichert; Teleplay by : John Bates	September 12, 1987
Fred pretends to be sick so that he can avoid going to school after failing to complete a project and uses crazy ink to draw spots on him. Dr. Gallstone examines Freddy during her housecall has him arranged to be taken to the hospital. When the crazy ink doesn't come off, Barney and Betty enlist Wilma and Philo for help which leads to a series of comical events.
27b	1b	"Killer Kitty"	Lane Raichert	September 12, 1987
Freddy's Aunt Hilda brings her "precious" kitty Sweetums on a visit to the Flintstone home. Freddy is led to believe that the cat is the sweetest pet around. Dino must prove otherwise when the mischievous cat gets him in trouble.
27c	1c	"Captain Knaveman"	Laren Bright	September 12, 1987
Captain Caveman loses his memory while pursuing the Teddy Bear Snatcher. Since he's disguised as a bad guy when he reaches him, Captain Caveman thinks he is a supervillain named Captain Badman and starts committing crimes. When Captain Badman leaves the Teddy Bear Snatcher and the true villains with no crimes to commit, they turn to Cavey Jr. for help.
28a	2a	"Better Buddy Blues"	Story by : Lane Raichert and Bill Matheny; Teleplay by : John Bates	September 19, 1987
Hollyrock star Shades Stone moves to Bedrock where he impresses Fred and Betty, but not Wilma and Barney. Shades takes advantage of Fred and Betty and the other youngsters in Bedrock. Wilma ignores Shades. When Fred decides that Shades is his new best friend, Barney runs away to the local swamp.
28b	2b	"Who's Faultin' Who?"	Lane Raichert	September 19, 1987
The snooty people at a prestigious dog training school snub Dino and Freddy. When jewel thieves attempt to rob the class, Dino demonstrates what a well-trained dog he is while the other pets cower!
28c	2c	"Attack of the Fifty Foot Teenage Lizard"	Story by : Lane Raichert and Bill Matheny; Teleplay by : John Bates	September 19, 1987
A teenage Godzilla-type monster named Billy is under pressure from his parents to be destructive with his younger sister even smashing her first building, but he bears no hatred towards cavepeople. After Billy's attempts to smash Bedrock, Captain Caveman and Cavey Jr. help the boy monster by getting him to tear down some old buildings slated for demolition while making Billy look good in front of his family.
29a	3a	"Anything You Can Do, I Can Do Betty"	Story by : Lane Raichert; Teleplay by : Mary Jo Ludin	September 26, 1987
Betty thinks she can do everything better with her ice cream business since other ice cream companies get in her way.
29b	3b	"Bone Voyage"	Lane Raichert	September 26, 1987
As Edna and Freddy prepare for Ed's birthday dinner, mischievous Dino attempts to pilfer some food. Dino's pranks lead to unexpected results when a helium-filled balloon he is using to steal the goodies floats away with him hanging on!
29c	3c	"The Cream-Pier Strikes Back"	Story by : Lane Raichert and Bill Matheny; Teleplay by : John Bates	September 26, 1987
Yuckster is throwing cream pies which contain a formula that turns anyone hit by them into Yucksters. When Captain Caveman gets hit by one, it is up to Cavey Jr. to restore everyone to normal and defeat Yuckster.
30a	4a	"Haircutastrophe"	Story by : Lane Raichert; Teleplay by : Mary Jo Ludin	October 3, 1987
Fred tries to save money for a new toy car by letting Barney cut his hair. When he does a bad job, Freddy turns to Philo for help with comical results.
30b	4b	"World War Flea"	Lane Raichert	October 3, 1987
While watching his favorite show, Dino is surprised by a visitor: a flea!
30c	4c	"Captain Caveman's Super Cold"	Story by : Lane Raichert; Teleplay by : Laren Bright	October 3, 1987
Captain Caveman has come down with a cold and does everything she can to try to get rid of it without having to visit a doctor much to the dismay of Cavey Jr. and the Mayor of Bedrock. Mr. Bad takes advantage of this by diverting Grandma Cavemom to Rock Vegas and getting rid of Captain Caveman with an anti-gravity formula while posing as Grandma Cavemom and the anti-gravity formula being passed off as Grandma Cavemom's chickensaurus soup.
31a	5a	"Camper Scamper"	Story by : Lane Raichert and Alan Swayze; Teleplay by : John Bates	October 10, 1987
While on a club scout trip in the woods, the gang tries to earn their merit badges, competing against Rocky and his gang. Note: This episode was followed by repeats of "Fred's Mechanical Dog" and "Grime and Punishment".
32a	6a	"A Tiny Egg"	Story by : Lane Raichert; Teleplay by : Mary Jo Ludin	October 17, 1987
The boys find a little egg belonging to a big dinosaur. Note: This episode is followed by repeats of "The Vet" and "Capt. Caveman's First Adventure".
33a	7a	"Freddy the 13th"	Story by : Lane Raichert; Teleplay by : John Bates	October 24, 1987
When Freddy and Betty discover two discarded Halloween costumes of a dragon and an octopus, they prepare for a fun night of trick-or-treating. Unbeknownst to them, two crooks known as the McBoulder Brothers used the costumes as disguises during a bank heist and the police mistake Freddy and Betty for the robbers!
33b	7b	"A Midnight Pet Peeve"	Lane Raichert	October 24, 1987
After being scolded for not appreciating Freddy's care, Dino falls asleep and dreams that he and Freddy have switched places. Dino wakes up with a new appreciation of Freddy's efforts.
33c	7c	"The Big Bedrock Bully Bash"	Story by : Lane Raichert; Teleplay by : Laren Bright	October 24, 1987
A local bully named Butch gets exposed to an experimental growth light and becomes a giant. Cavey Jr. turns to his dad to find a way to stop Butch and return him to normal size.
34a	8a	"Philo's D-feat"	Story by : Lane Raichert; Teleplay by : John Bates	October 31, 1987
Philo gets his first D grade after failing to finish his robotic science project. It is up to him to finish the project with help from the gang so he can get an A.
34b	8b	"The Birthday Shuffle"	Lane Raichert	October 31, 1987
Despite Freddy's warnings, Dino can't wait to open his birthday present. After tearing off the wrapping, Dino must replace it before Freddy discovers what happened.
34c	8c	"Captain Cavedog"	Lane Raichert	October 31, 1987
With help from fellow inmates Piggy McGrabit, Trash Man, Teddy Bear Snatcher, and Yuckster, Mr. Bad escapes from prison. He transforms Captain Caveman into a dog with his special hot dogs at the time when he and Cavey Jr. were on a talk show. Cavey Jr. hunts down Mr. Bad for the antidote and to get him back to prison before the effects of the special hot dogs causes Captain Caveman to permanently remain a dog.
35a	9a	"Little Rubble, Big Trouble"	Story by : John Bates and Lane Raichert; Teleplay by : Mary Jo Ludin	November 7, 1987
After Barney mistakenly drinks one of Philo's secret potions, the mention of certain foods causes him to transform into a tough towering humanoid and attack Rocky. Note: This episode was followed by repeats of "Dreamchip's Cur Wash" and "Invasion of the Mommy Snatchers".
36a	10a	"Rocky's Rocky Road"	Story by : Lane Raichert; Teleplay by : Mary Jo Ludin	November 14, 1987
After being sent to the principal's office again, Rocky has one last chance to be nice around the other students rather than be a mean bully. If he fails, his mother will ship him off to military school. Rocky turns to Fred and his friends for help. Note: This episode was followed by repeats of "The Butcher Shoppe" and "The Ditto Master".

== Voice cast ==
Flintstone Kids cast.

- Charlie Adler as Cavey Jr., Armored Car Robber #2 (in "Captain Knaveman")
- Bever-Leigh Banfield as Mayor of Bedrock ("Captain Caveman and Son" segment)
- Michael Bell as Mr. Billy Bad ("Captain Caveman and Son" segment)
- Mel Blanc as Dino, Bob Rubble, Captain Caveman ("Captain Caveman and Son" segment)
- Susan Blu as Dreamchip Gemstone, Janet Granite, Mrs. Gemstone (in "Poor Little Rich Girl")
- Hamilton Camp as Barney Rubble, Flab Slab, Cragmire, Tree Surgeon #2 (in "I Think That I Shall Never See Barney Rubble As a Tree"), Brick Stonespring (in "The Rock Concert That Rocked Freddy"), Bouncer (in "The Rock Concert That Rocked Freddy"), Rock Ruben (in "Betty's Big Break"), Charlie (in "The Little Visitor"), Ralph (in "Attack of the Fifty Foot Teenage Lizard")
- Henry Corden as Ed Flintstone, Edna Flintstone, Announcer #1 (in "Dusty Disappears"), Chef (in "The Rock Concert That Rocked Freddy")
- Julie Dees as Wilma Slaghoople (1986), Mica Slaghoople, Mickey Slaghoople, Tarpit Tommy, Mike Worthingstone (in "Barney's Moving Experience")
- Elizabeth Lyn Fraser as Wilma Slaghoople (1987)
- Kenneth Mars as Narrator ("Captain Caveman and Son" segments), Trash Man (in "Grime and Punishment", "Day of the Villains", and "Captain Cavedog"), Armored Car Robber #1 (in "Captain Knaveman"), Museum Robber (in "Captain Knaveman")
- Scott Menville as Freddy Flintstone (1987)
- Bumper Robinson as Philo Quartz
- Marilyn Schreffler as Rocky Ratrock, Flo Rubble, Billy's Mother (in "Attack of the Fifty Foot Teenage Lizard"), Tilda (in "Attack of the Fifty Foot Teenage Lizard"), Mrs. Ratrock (in "Rocky's Rocky Road")
- B.J. Ward as Betty McBricker, Mrs. Rockbottom, Big Shot Player (in "The Bad News Brontos"), Dusty Rubble (in "Dusty Disappears", "The Little Visitor", and "Bedrock'n Roll"), Madame Lasagna (in "Dusty Disappears"), Billy (in "Attack of the Fifty Foot Teenage Lizard")
- Lennie Weinrib as Freddy Flintstone (1986), Police Commissioner ("Captain Caveman and Son" segment)
- Frank Welker as Nate Slate, Stalagbite, Fang, Brick McBricker, fill-ins for Dino and Bob Rubble, Rowley (in "The Great Freddini"), Frankenpebble (in "Frankenstone"), Spike (in "Yard Wars" and "Revenge of the Bullied"), Fluffy (in "Dreamchip's Cur Wash" and "Anything You Can Do, I Can Do Betty"), Alien #1 (in "Rubble Without a Cause"), Announcer #2 (in "Dusty Disappears"), Mr. Stonewall (in "The Butcher Shoppe"), Dino's Mother (in "Dino Come Home"), Hal Worthingstone (in "Barney's Big Break"), Spot (in "Barney's Big Break"), Professor Pebblehead (in "The Flintstone Fake Ache"), Sweetums (in "Killer Kitty"), Kitty (in "Captain Knaveman"), Thug (in "Captain Knaveman"), Baby Tyrannosaurus (in "Better Buddy Blues"), Mother Tyrannosaurus (in "Better Buddy Blues"), Thug #2 (in "Who's Faultin' Who?"), Worker (in "Attack of the Fifty Foot Teenage Lizard"), Fleasaurus (in "World War Flea"), Allosaurus (in "Camper Scamper"), Tiny (in "A Tiny Egg")

=== Additional voices ===
- Bob Arbogast
- James Avery
- Jon Bauman as Announcer #3 (in "Dusty Disappears")
- Julie Bennett
- Sorrell Booke
- Robin Braxton
- Valri Bromfield
- Arthur Burghardt as Thug #1 (in "Who's Faultin' Who?")
- Victoria Carroll
- Kristina Chan
- Townsend Coleman
- Roberto Cruz
- Peter Cullen as Monster from the Tar Pit (in "The Monster from the Tar Pit")
- Brian Cummings
- Jim Cummings as Billy Jim (in "The Rock Concert That Rocked Freddy"), Peter Snobsale (in "The Rock Concert That Rocked Freddy"), Police Officer (in "The Rock Concert That Rocked Freddy"), Burglar (in "Watchdog Blues")
- Rick Dees as Perfect Man (in "Hero Today, Gone Tomorrow"), Bruce Leeslab (in "Freddy's Rocky Road to Karate"), Rock Dees (in "Bedrock'n Roll")
- Dick Erdman as Dr. Icemare (in "Freezy Does It" and "Day of the Villains")
- Jennifer Fajardo
- Takayo Fischer as Eskimo Bro (in "Freddy's Rocky Road to Karate"), Dr. Gallstone (in "The Flintstone Fake Ache")
- June Foray as Grandma Cavemom, Old Lady (in "The Butcher Shoppe"), Aunt Hilda (in "Killer Kitty")
- Pat Fraley as Raff (in "Invasion of the Mommy Snatchers"), Alien #2 (in "Rubble Without a Cause")
- Lillian Garrett
- Ernest Harada
- Dana Hill as Criminal (in "Captain Knaveman"), Shades Stone (in "Better Buddy Blues")
- Robert Ito
- Arte Johnson
- Buster Jones as Officer Quartz
- Aron Kincaid as Brad McBricker (in "Day of the Villains" and "Bedrock'n Roll")
- Robbie Lee
- Peter Leeds
- Rene Levant
- Allan Lurie
- Tress MacNeille as Riff and Raff's Mother (in "Invasion of the Mommy Snatchers")
- Janet May
- Cindy McGee
- Howard Morris as Tree Surgeon #1 (in "I Think That I Shall Never See Barney Rubble As a Tree"), Grandpa Stoney Flintstone (in "The Little Visitor" and "Grandpa for Loan")
- George O'Hanlon
- Rob Paulsen as Riff (in "Invasion of the Mommy Snatchers")
- Gustavo Palacios
- Helga Pedrini
- Corey Rand
- Shavar Ross
- Michael Rye as Mr. Slaghoople
- Ronnie Schell as Yuckster (in "A Tale of Too Silly," "Day of the Villains," "The Cream -Pier Strikes Back," and "Captain Cavedog")
- Avery Schreiber as Mr. Sciencedome (in "To Baby or Not To Baby")
- John Stephenson as Mr. Gemstone, Mr. Slate (in "The Bad News Brontos"), Ditto Master (in "The Ditto Master," "Day of the Villains"), Announcer (in "The Ditto Master")
- Marcelo Tubert
- Jean Vander Pyl as Pearl Slaghoople (in "The Bad News Brontos", uncredited)
- Vernee Watson-Johnson
- Beau Weaver as Beaversaurus (in "Betty's Big Break")
- Patric Zimmerman

== Home media ==
On May 4, 2010, Warner Home Video released Saturday Morning Cartoons 1980s, Volume 1, a compilation release which features episodes from various 80's cartoons including an episode from The Flintstone Kids. On March 11, 2014, Warner Home Video released The Flintstone Kids: Rockin' in Bedrock, a 2-disc set featuring 10 episodes from the first season, on DVD in Region 1.

== Reception ==
=== Critical response ===
Common Sense Media gave the series a three out of five stars, saying: "Bedrock, the early years: cute and more P.C."

=== Awards ===
In 1988, Mary Jo Ludin and Lane Raichert were given the Humanitas Prize for the show's episode "Rocky's Rocky Road".

== Other appearances ==
Cavey Jr. appears in the Harvey Birdman, Attorney at Law episode "Evolutionary War", voiced by Maurice LaMarche. Captain Caveman enlists Harvey Birdman when Cavey Jr.'s school won't teach its students about evolution after Cavey Jr. spoke out against it.

Cavey Jr. appears in Jellystone! voiced by Dana Snyder. Rocky Ratrock appears in the third season as a member of New Bedrock School team.
