= Fred Flintstone =

Character from The Flintstones

- The Flintstones character
- First appearance: The Flintstones: "The Flagstones" (pilot) (as Fred Flagstone); 1959 "The Flintstone Flyer" (1.01) (as Fred Flintstone); September 30, 1960
- Created by: William Hanna; Joseph Barbera
- Appearance: Caveman, orange shirt, blue tie, black hair, barefoot
- Voiced by: Daws Butler (pilot; 1959, 1973); Alan Reed (1960–1977); Duke Mitchell (1960–1961); Jerry Wallace (1962); Henry Corden (1965–2005); Jeff Bergman (1984, 1994–present); Lennie Weinrib/Scott Menville (The Flintstone Kids); James Arnold Taylor (2005–2011, 2016); Rick Zieff (2021); Stephen Root (Bedrock)
- Portrayed by: John Goodman (1994 film); Alan Blumenfeld (look-alike, 1994 film); Mark Addy (2000 film)

In-universe information
- Full name: Frederick Joseph Flintstone; Fred W. Flintstone
- Aliases: Muscles Flintstone; Jake Steel
- Nicknames: Fred "Twinkletoes" (bowling alley nickname)
- Species: Human; Caveman
- Gender: Male
- Occupation: Crane operator Police officer
- Family: Ed "Pops" Flintstone (father); Eithne "Edna" Flintstone (mother); Freida (sister; tie-in comic strips only); Ferd (nephew; tie-in comic strips only); Rockbottom K. "Rocky"/Stony Flintstone (paternal grandfather); Jed Flintstone (great-grandfather); Tex Hardrock (uncle); Jemina (aunt); Giggles Flintstone (uncle); Hatrock (uncle); Zeke Flintstone (great-great-uncle); Davy Crockery (maternal great-grandfather); Tumbleweed (cousin); Mary Lou Jim (cousin); Pearl Slaghoople (mother-in-law); Ricky Slaghoople (father-in-law); Bamm-Bamm Rubble (son-in-law); Roxy Rubble (granddaughter); Chip Rubble (grandson)
- Spouse: Wilma Flintstone (wife)
- Children: Pebbles Flintstone (daughter); Stoney Flintstone (adopted son)
- Catchphrase: "Yabba-Dabba-Doo!"

Fred Flintstone is the main protagonist of the animated sitcom The Flintstones, which aired during prime-time on ABC during the original series' run from 1960 to 1966. Fred is the husband of Wilma Flintstone and father of Pebbles Flintstone and together the family live in their homely cave in the town of Bedrock. His best friend is his next door neighbor, Barney, who has a wife named Betty.

Fred lives in the fictional prehistoric town of Bedrock, a world where dinosaurs coexist with modernized cavepeople and the cavepeople enjoy "primitive" versions of modern conveniences such as telephones, automobiles, and washing machines. Fred's trademark catchphrase yell is "yabba dabba doo!", a phrase that was originally his club's cheer, and later adopted as part of the theme song from the third season on and used in the 1994 live-action Flintstones film.

Since the original series' run, Fred has appeared in various other cartoon spinoffs, live action adaptations, music videos, video games, and commercials.

== Biography ==
While the mid-1980s spin-off series The Flintstone Kids depicts Fred as a child, the series may be apocryphal due to its presenting Wilma as a childhood friend of Fred and Barney; the original series asserts that they first met as young adults. Still, the series' depiction of Fred as the only child of Ed (a handyman) and Edna (homemaker) Flintstone might be canon. (Pops Flintstone was in a comic strip.)

As young adults, Fred and Barney worked as bellhops at a resort. There, they met and fell in love with Wilma and Betty, who were working there as cigarette girls. Fred met Wilma's mother, Pearl Slaghoople, and the two took an instant dislike to each other. An unspecified amount of time later, Fred married Wilma.

Fred is a typical blue-collar worker, who works as a "bronto crane operator" at Slate Rock and Gravel Company (also known as Rockhead and Quarry Cave Construction Company in earlier episodes). Fred's job title in the second-season episode "Divided We Sail" is "geological engineer".

During the original series' third season, Wilma gives birth to the couple's daughter, Pebbles. Years later, when Pebbles is a teenager, Fred and Barney join the Bedrock police force for a time as part-time police officers. Eventually, Fred becomes a grandfather to the adult Pebbles and Bamm-Bamm's twins, Chip and Roxy. Fred's family grew again in A Flintstone Family Christmas, when he and Wilma adopted an orphaned caveboy named Stony, and despite a rough start, Fred and his new son bonded well.

== Relatives ==
The Flintstone family's paternal side originally came from the prehistoric state of Arkanstone in Camp Mastodon, where they had been engaged in a feud similar to the Hatfield–McCoy feud. The feud began when one of Fred’s ancestors mocked a Hatrock family portrait, quipping, “I don’t know what the artist got for that painting, but he should’ve gotten life!” In the fourth-season episode "Bedrock Hillbillies", the feud is ended when Fred helps rescue Pebbles and a Hatrock baby, only to start up again when Fred makes the same joke as his ancestor. The Hatrocks later appear in the follow-up fifth-season episode "The Hatrocks and the Gruesomes", where they visit Bedrock. The last of the Camp Mastodon Arkanstone Flintstones was Fred's great-great-granduncle Zeke Flintstone who lived to 102.

Other relatives of Fred include: Rocco Rockbottom "Rocky/Stony" Flintstone, Fred's grandfather, who was a Camp Mastodon veteran of Air Force Stone World War One; Uncle Giggles Flintstone, a rich, eccentric practical joker whose jokes drive Fred into a mad rage; James Hardrock, Edna's father; Uncle Tex Hardrock, Fred's rich Texan uncle; Tumbleweed and Mary Lou Jim, Fred's rich Texan cousins.

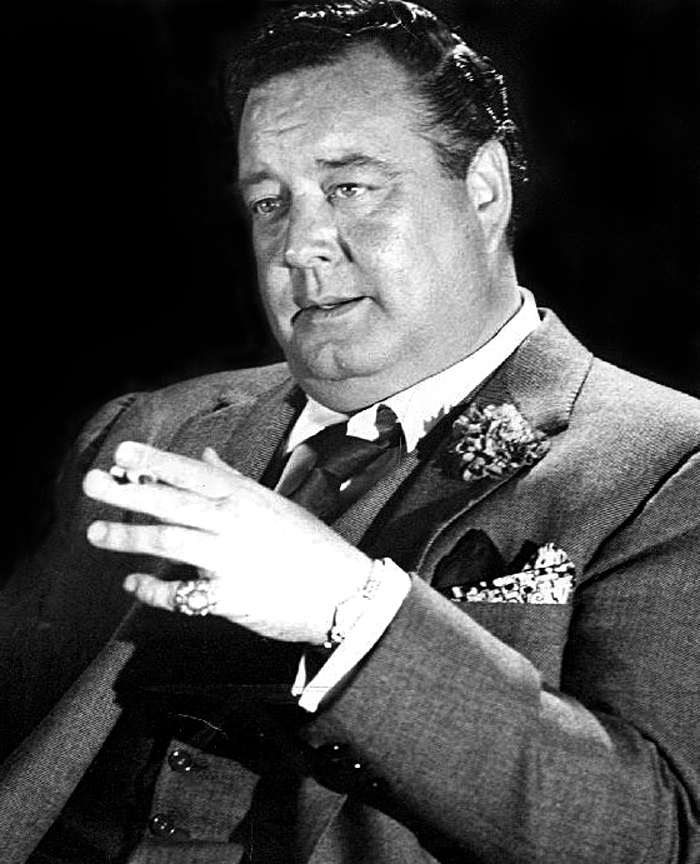
The Flintstones character was based on the character Ralph Kramden (Jackie Gleason) from The Honeymooners

== Personality ==
Fred's personality was based on those of early television's Ralph Kramden of The Honeymooners and Chester A. Riley of The Life of Riley, both roles held at various times by Jackie Gleason. (Riley was more closely associated with William Bendix, who originated the role, though Gleason replaced Bendix due to a contract dispute for The Life of Riley's first season on television.) Much like Ralph, Fred tends to be loud-mouthed, aggressive, temperamental and constantly scheming ways to improve his family's working class lot in life, often with unintended results. Also like Ralph, despite his harshness, he is friendly, and has a loving heart, who is very devoted to his family and cares a lot about his best friend and next door neighbor Barney Rubble. Fred loses his temper easily and is very impatient, but he seems free of malice and never holds a grudge. Although his loudness irritates the people around him, Fred proves friendly, often going out of his way to help others. Also, although Fred often annoys Wilma with his immaturity, he is known to go to great lengths to please his family and apologize when he goes too far.

Fred's interests include bowling, playing pool, golf, poker and lounging around the house. Fred has won championships with his bowling skills; in one episode, he goes so far as to take ballet lessons in order to improve his game (hence his trademark bowling delivery). The nickname of "Twinkletoes" stuck with him when Fred attended a local university and became eligible to play on their football team, and it became his call sign. Fred is also an excellent golfer. Fred is a member of the Loyal Order of Water Buffalos Lodge (named "the Loyal Order of Dinosaurs" in an early episode). Fred also has a serious gambling problem; the mere mention of the word "bet" causes Fred to stammer "bet" over and over again (sounding like a clucking chicken) and go on gambling binges. Fred is also an avid driver. In the fifth-season episode "Indianrockolis 500", Fred entered the famed prehistoric auto race under the pseudonym "Goggles Paisano".

Fred's catchphrase is "Yabba-Dabba-Doo!"; Alan Reed, voice actor who provided Fred's voice from 1960 to 1977, reportedly said the inspiration for the phrase came from his mother, who used to say, "A little dab'll do ya," probably borrowed from a Brylcreem commercial. When the script called for a simple yahoo, Alan either asked if he could alter the phrase or he ad-libbed. It inspired, in the 1970s a short-lived fruit drink called "Yabba Dabba Dew" and may or may not have also inspired George Jetson's similar-sounding catchphrase, "Hooba-dooba-dooba" (or "Hooba-Dooba"). It does, however, become the subject of a song by Hoagy Carmichael which the singer-songwriter performs in one episode of The Flintstones. Fred's ability to carry a tune was quite good in his younger years. One early episode sees Fred (with Barney, who is a skilled drummer) perform at a nightclub with his musician friend "Hot Lips Hannigan" where his singing caused teenage girls to swoon over him; on this occasion, he was nicknamed the "Golden Smog". In another first-season episode, "Girls' Night Out", Fred recorded a demo record at a carnival of the song "Listen to the Rocking Bird", which ended up making him a teenage singing idol named "Hi Fye". As the series progressed, however, his voice became worse and worse (even during his success as a singer, Wilma was never impressed by Fred's voice), eventually to the point that a temporary maid the Flintstones hired quit rather than having to hear Fred sing. (Alan Reed himself was not a good singer; in instances where he was expected to sing well, a stand-in—usually Henry Corden from 1965 onward—would be used.)

Due to his impulsive and short-tempered behavior and stubborn and somewhat selfish nature, Fred seems to be accident-prone. Even his most innocent and mundane actions often cause widespread confusion. At the end of the closing credits, Fred puts the Flintstones housecat "Baby Puss" outside; the cat however jumps back inside and puts Fred out who begins to knock on the door of his house and starts yelling "Wilma", to open the door.

According to the original series' third-season episode "The Birthday Party" (originally aired April 5, 1963), Fred's birthday is February 2. Fred's address has varied through the series' run, with addresses given for the Flintstone residence including, 201 Cobblestone Lane (October 21, 1960 - "No Help Wanted" episode), 345 Cave Stone Road, 39 Stone Canyon Way, and 1313 Cobblestone Way. Fred's address was cited as "35 Cobblestone Rd" in the 1961 episode "The X-Ray Story".

== Animated media ==
=== Television shows ===
- The Flagstones (1959)
- The Flintstones (1960–1966)
- The Pebbles and Bamm-Bamm Show (1971–1972)
- The Flintstone Comedy Hour (1972–1974)
- Scooby's All-Star Laff-A-Lympics (1977–1978)
- Fred Flintstone and Friends (1977–1978)
- The New Fred and Barney Show (1979)
- Fred and Barney Meet the Thing (1979)
- Fred and Barney Meet the Shmoo (1979–1980)
- The Flintstone Comedy Show (1980–1982)
- The Flintstone Funnies (1982–1984)
- The Flintstone Kids (1986–1988)
- What a Cartoon!, featuring Dino: Stay Out! (1995)
- The Rubbles (2002)
- Yabba Dabba Dinosaurs (2020)
- Jellystone! (2021)
- Bedrock (cancelled)

=== Films and specials ===
- Alice in Wonderland or What's a Nice Kid Like You Doing in a Place Like This? (1966)
- The Man Called Flintstone (1966)
- The Flintstones on Ice (1973)
- Energy: A National Issue (1977)
- A Flintstone Christmas (1977)
- Hanna-Barbera's All-Star Comedy Ice Revue (1978)
- The Flintstones: Little Big League (1978)
- Hanna-Barbera Educational Filmstrips (1980); featuring A Weighty Problem, Fire Alarm, Fire Escape and Driving Guide
- The Flintstones' New Neighbors (1980)
- The Flintstones Meet Rockula and Frankenstone (1980)
- The Flintstones: Fred's Final Fling (1980)
- The Funtastic World of Hanna-Barbera Arena Show (1981)
- The Flintstones: Wind-Up Wilma (1981)
- The Flintstones: Jogging Fever (1981)
- Yogi Bear's All Star Comedy Christmas Caper (1982)
- The Flintstones' 25th Anniversary Celebration (1986)
- The Jetsons Meet the Flintstones (1987)
- The Flintstone Kids' "Just Say No" Special (1988)
- A Yabba Dabba Doo Celebration: 50 Years of Hanna-Barbera (1989)
- I Yabba-Dabba Do! (1993) (voiced by Henry Corden)
- Hollyrock-a-Bye Baby (1993)
- A Flintstone Family Christmas (1993)
- The Flintstones (1994) (portrayed by John Goodman)
- A Flintstones Christmas Carol (1994)
- What a Cartoon!, featuring Dino: Stay Out! (1995)
- The Flintstones in Viva Rock Vegas (2000) (portrayed by Mark Addy)
- The Flintstones: On the Rocks (2001) (voiced by Jeff Bergman)
- The Flintstones & WWE: Stone Age SmackDown! (2015)
- Space Jam: A New Legacy (2021) (briefly voiced by Jeff Bergman)

=== Video games ===
- The Flintstones: The Rescue of Dino & Hoppy
- The Flintstones
- The Flintstones: Surprise at Dinosaur Peak
- The Flintstones: The Treasure of Sierra Madrock
- The Flintstones: Bedrock Bowling
- The Flintstones in Viva Rock Vegas

== Portrayal ==
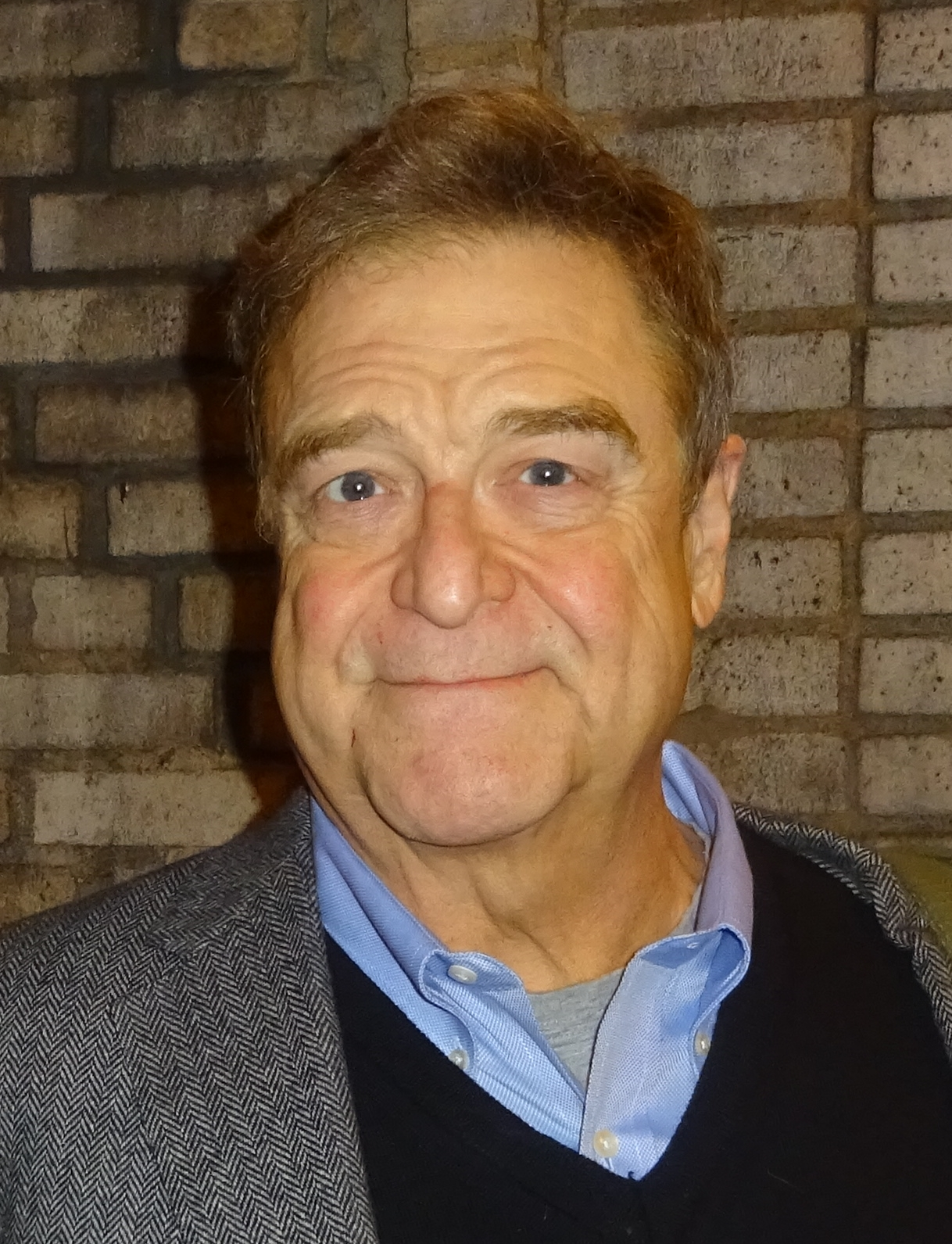
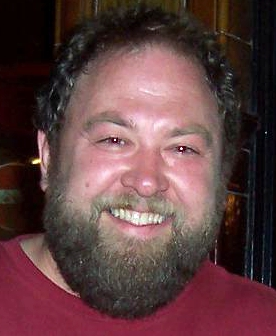
John Goodman and Mark Addy have portrayed Fred Flintstone in live-action films The Flintstones and The Flintstones in Viva Rock Vegas.

George O'Hanlon originally auditioned for the role of Fred Flintstone, but was rejected. He later went on to voice George Jetson, another Hanna-Barbera character in the animated sitcom The Jetsons. Bill Thompson was originally cast as Fred Flintstone, but William Hanna and Joseph Barbera decided to recast Alan Reed in the role. Reed re-dubbed Fred's voice in several earlier episodes that Thompson had already recorded (Thompson can still be heard in some bit roles in the early episodes). Reed voiced Fred for a total of seventeen years until his death in 1977 (except for the original short pilot where he was voiced by Daws Butler, who also voiced him on a 1973 record). Duke Mitchell provided the singing voice of Fred in the episodes "Hot Lips Hannigan" and "Girls' Night Out". Jerry Wallace performed Fred's singing voice in the episode "The Twitch".

Henry Corden occasionally voiced Fred on records throughout the 1960s, and also provided the singing voice for Fred in The Man Called Flintstone. In 1972-1975, Lionel Wilson and Jackson Beck provided Fred's voice for two Flintstones record albums produced by Peter Pan Records. Following Reed's death, Corden officially took over the role until his retirement in 2000, although he continued to voice him in Post Pebbles commercials until his death in 2005. Corden voiced Fred's father and mother in The Flintstone Kids, while young Fred was voiced by both Lennie Weinrib and Scott Menville at different points.

Australian voice actor Keith Scott provided Fred's voice in various commercials throughout the 1970s, 1980s and 1990s and the live show Hanna-Barbera Gala Celebrity Nite at the Wonderland Sydney amusement park in Australia. Willie Ito provided Fred's Japanese voice for a scene in The Flintstones' 25th Anniversary Celebration.

Jeff Bergman voiced Fred in the fourth episode of The New Show and Flintstones/Jetsons: Timewarp and performed the character throughout the 1990s and 2000s for various Cartoon Network and Boomerang commercials and bumpers, and voiced him in The Flintstones: On the Rocks, his guest appearance in Johnny Bravo, some episodes of Family Guy, and The Flintstones & WWE: Stone Age SmackDown!. James Arnold Taylor voiced Fred in commercials following Corden's death, up until 2011, as well as his guest appearance in The Grim Adventures of Billy & Mandy. Taylor returned to voice Fred in 2016 for a Columbus Zoo commercial. He was also voiced by Scott Innes in a Toshiba commercial.

Other voices include Maurice LaMarche (in Harvey Birdman, Attorney at Law), Stephen Stanton (in Robot Chicken), Dave Coulier (in Robot Chicken), Fred Tatasciore (in MAD), Seth Green (in Robot Chicken), and Rick Zieff (in Dick Clark's New Year's Rockin' Eve 2021). In various Italian dubs, Fred's voice was provided by Italian voice actor Carlo Bonomi. Stephen Root was planned to voice Fred Flintstone in the scrapped FOX series Bedrock.

=== Live action portrayal ===
In the first live-action film, The Flintstones, Fred was played by John Goodman, who also provided his voice for the film's pinball adaptation. In the prequel film, The Flintstones in Viva Rock Vegas, in which Fred is portrayed as younger than he was in the original, he was played by British actor Mark Addy.

== In other media ==
=== Commercials ===
Fred Flintstone and Barney Rubble were pitchmen for Winston cigarettes, the show's sponsor at the time. In one ad, Fred and Barney saw the men working hard at the quarry and decided to retire out of sight for a smoke break. After extolling the virtues of their favorite brand, Fred lit up and delivered the catch phrase: "Winston tastes good like a cigarette should." A similar ad featured Wilma and Betty as well. By the original series' third season, Winston had been dropped in favor of Welch's.

== Reception ==
Fred Flintstone was ranked 3rd on the 10 Best Hanna-Barbara Characters Ranked List

== See also ==
- Flintstones Chewable Vitamins
- Pebbles Cereal
