= Barney Rubble =

Fictional character in the television animated series The Flintstones

- The Flintstones character
- First appearance: "The Flagstones" (1959)
- Created by: William Hanna; Joseph Barbera
- Voiced by: Daws Butler (pilot; 1959, 1961–1973); Mel Blanc (1960–1989); Jeff Bergman (1984, 1990–2009, 2015, 2018-present); Hamilton Camp (1986–1988); Frank Welker (1990–2006); Kevin Michael Richardson (2001–present); Paul F. Tompkins (Jellystone!); Jim Conroy (as Captain Caveman; Jellystone!)
- Portrayed by: Rick Moranis (1994 film); Stephen Baldwin (2000 film)

In-universe information
- Full name: Bernard Matthew Rubble
- Species: Caveman
- Gender: Male
- Occupation: Furniture repossessor (original series); Police officer Crane operator
- Family: Robert "Bob" Rubble (father); Flo Slate Rubble (mother); Dusty Rubble (brother); Roxy Rubble (granddaughter), Chip Rubble (grandson); Pebbles Flintstone (daughter-in-law)
- Spouse: Betty Rubble (wife)
- Children: Bamm-Bamm Rubble (adoptive son)

Barney Rubble is a fictional character who appears in the television animated series The Flintstones. He is the short, blond-haired caveman husband of Betty Rubble and adoptive father of Bamm-Bamm Rubble. His best friend is his next door neighbor, Fred Flintstone.

Barney's personality was based on that of Ed Norton on the 1950s television series The Honeymooners, played by Art Carney. Like Ralph Kramden on The Honeymooners, Fred was constantly on the lookout for get-rich-quick schemes, while Barney, like Norton, found life satisfactory as it was, but participated in said schemes because Fred was his friend. Usually, after Fred had hatched one of his plans, Barney showed his agreement by laughing and saying, "Uh hee hee hee... OK, Fred!" or "Whatever you say, Fred!"

In the early episodes, Barney had a New Jersey accent. It was soon changed to a deeper, more chuckle-like American voice. In "On the Rocks" and the late 2000s, his New Jersey accent returns.

Barney's interests included bowling, playing pool, poker, tinkering around in Fred's garage, and playing golf (though in some episodes, Barney did not know how to play golf). He, like Fred, was also a member of the Loyal Order of Water Buffaloes lodge and its predecessor in earlier episodes, the Loyal Order of Dinosaurs. He is also a talented pianist and drummer. In the first episode of the original series, he was an inventor of a human-powered helicopter. Another time Barney actually built an advanced sports car racer; which almost but did not win a $50,000 race because the car's stone wheels crumbled at the last minute. Although clearly depicted as being in better shape than Fred, he is not shown to be quite as enthusiastic a sportsman as Fred is. This distinction can be attributed to Fred's fondness for food, though Barney is shown to be almost as capable of excessive appetite on a number of occasions.

== Biography ==
Barney grew up at 142 Boulder Avenue in Granitetown (north of Bedrock). He was acknowledged to be the maternal nephew of Fred Flintstone's boss, Mr. George Slate. As young adults, Barney and Fred worked as bellhops at a resort, where they first met Wilma and Betty, who were working as cigarette girls. Eventually, Barney married Betty (as Fred did Wilma).

Several episodes and spinoffs suggest that Barney, along with Fred, spent some time in the army early in their marriages, though said references may be to Barney and Fred's military service in the first-season episode "The Astr'nuts."

An early episode of the original series does have a brief scene of Barney working at the Granite Building for a Mr. H. Granite. He was fired from his job during the first-season episode "No Help Wanted" (due to Fred's misguided attempt to negotiate a raise for Barney) and takes a new job as a repo man. His employment is never addressed over the remainder of the series. The majority of subsequent spinoffs suggest at some point after the original series, Barney went to work at the Slate Rock and Gravel Company quarry alongside Fred as a fellow dino-crane operator. When speaking to an upper-crust snob in another episode, Betty declares Barney is in "top-secret" work, but that might have been a cover for a low-level job or unemployment, or perhaps an in-joke meaning that Barney's job was unknown even to the show's writers. It could also be possible that both Fred and Barney work at the quarry, but may work in different sections of it, under different bosses. In one episode, Barney's boss tells him to "put down his broom", which implies some sort of janitorial work is involved. Nevertheless, since Barney's occupation was never made explicitly clear, inebriated fans of the show would call Hanna-Barbera Studios afterhours to ask about Barney's occupation. In later series like The New Fred and Barney Show, the franchise has Barney working as a co-worker in the same quarry as Fred.

During the fourth season of the original series, Betty and Barney found an abandoned infant on their doorstep, by the name of "Bamm-Bamm". A court battle ensued between the couple and a wealthy man who also had wanted to adopt Bamm-Bamm. Barney and Betty were successful in their efforts to adopt Bamm-Bamm because the wealthy man gave up (after winning the case) upon learning his wife became pregnant, after which Bamm-Bamm became a regular character on the series. For the next nine episodes (though Bamm-Bamm aired on "Kleptomaniac Pebbles" in the opening scene teaser but not in the body of the episode but would return two episodes later) after Bamm-Bamm's debut, he does not appear on the show. This was because "Little Bamm-Bamm" was made after these episodes, but was broadcast first. Once more episodes were made, Bamm-Bamm appeared regularly. In the fifth season, the family buys a pet "hopparoo" (a combination of a kangaroo and dinosaur) named Hoppy.

When Bamm-Bamm grew into a teenager, Barney joined the Bedrock police force with Fred for a period of time as part-time officers. Both characters were paired with the Shmoo from Li'l Abner. He later became grandfather to Pebbles's and Bamm-Bamm's children, Charleston Frederick "Chip" and Roxeanne Elizabeth "Roxy" Flintstone-Rubble.

Although Fred and Barney are best friends, Barney loses his patience with Fred occasionally. The best example comes in I Yabba-Dabba Do!: after losing his patience with Fred for ruining Pebbles's and Bamm-Bamm's wedding, Barney decides to leave Bedrock. He changes his mind after Fred apologizes. Fred is often annoyed by Barney's inveterate cheerfulness, but he does truly care for him.

In the series' original episodes until the end of season 5, Barney's eyes are drawn as ovals or (occasionally) dark circular outlines (similar to Little Orphan Annie in her comics). In other episodes, and on all the season 6 ones, they are solid black, similar to Wilma's eyes.

== Animated media ==
=== Television shows ===
- The Flagstones (1959)
- The Flintstones (1960–1966)
- The Pebbles and Bamm-Bamm Show (1971–1972)
- The Flintstone Comedy Hour (1972–1974)
- Scooby's All-Star Laff-A-Lympics (1977–1978)
- Fred Flintstone and Friends (1977–1978)
- The New Fred and Barney Show (1979)
- Fred and Barney Meet the Thing (1979)
- Fred and Barney Meet the Shmoo (1979–1980)
- The Flintstone Comedy Show (1980–1982)
- The Flintstone Funnies (1982–1984)
- The Flintstone Kids (1986–1988)
- The Rubbles (2002)
- Yabba Dabba Dinosaurs (2020)
- Jellystone! (2021)
- Bedrock (Cancelled)

=== Films and specials ===
- Alice in Wonderland or What's a Nice Kid Like You Doing in a Place Like This? (1966)
- The Man Called Flintstone (1966)
- The Flintstones on Ice (1973)
- A Flintstone Christmas (1977)
- Hanna-Barbera's All-Star Comedy Ice Revue (1978)
- The Flintstones: Little Big League (1978)
- Hanna-Barbera Educational Filmstrips – featuring Bamm-Bamm Tackles a Term Paper, A Weighty Problem, Fire Alarm, Fire Escape and Driving Guide (1978–1980)
- The Flintstones' New Neighbors (1980)
- The Flintstones Meet Rockula and Frankenstone (1980)
- The Flintstones: Fred's Final Fling (1980)
- The Flintstones: Wind-Up Wilma (1981)
- The Flintstones: Jogging Fever (1981)
- Yogi Bear's All Star Comedy Christmas Caper (1982)
- The Flintstones' 25th Anniversary Celebration (1986)
- The Jetsons Meet the Flintstones (1987)
- The Flintstone Kids' "Just Say No" Special (1988)
- A Yabba Dabba Doo Celebration: 50 Years of Hanna-Barbera (1989)
- I Yabba-Dabba Do! (1993)
- Hollyrock-a-Bye Baby (1993)
- A Flintstone Family Christmas (1993) (voiced by Frank Welker)
- The Flintstones (1994) (portrayed by Rick Moranis)
- A Flintstones Christmas Carol (1994) (playing as Bob Cragit)
- The Flintstones in Viva Rock Vegas (2000) (portrayed by Stephen Baldwin)
- The Flintstones: On the Rocks (2001) (voiced by Kevin Michael Richardson)
- The Flintstones & WWE: Stone Age SmackDown! (2015) (voiced by Kevin Michael Richardson)
- Space Jam: A New Legacy (2021)

== Portrayal ==
Hal Smith originally auditioned for the role of Barney Rubble, and did a test track of his voice and that of Fred Flintstone for the pilot, but was replaced with Daws Butler. When the series sold, Jerry Hausner (and later Smith) and Bill Thompson were cast as Barney and Fred respectively, but were replaced with Mel Blanc and Alan Reed. While the voices of the other characters were based on their The Honeymooners counterparts, Blanc was asked to model Barney's voice after the voice of Ed Norton, but he reportedly refused, thinking that it was stealing a voice from another actor. For the first 15 episodes of season 1, he gave Barney a higher-pitched, nasal New Jersey accent to the point of portraying him as a smart-aleck, though towards the later part of the season he eventually relented and Barney's smart-alecky personality was gradually toned down. Blanc's Barney voice varied from the New Jersey accent to a deeper, more chuckle-like voice, as he and Barbera, who directed the sessions with Alan Dinehart, explored the right level in relation to comedy and other characters. Blanc used both voices in one of the earliest episodes, "The Prowler".

At the end of season 1, Blanc was involved in a near-fatal car crash, which sent him into a 2-week long coma. Butler briefly assumed the role for five episodes of season 2 while Blanc recovered from the accident, continuing to deliver a Norton-inspired performance. Incidentally, Butler was also the original voice of Yogi Bear, who was also inspired by the character of Ed Norton. When Blanc awoke from his coma, he was able to return to the series much sooner than expected, by virtue of a temporary recording studio for the entire cast set up at Blanc's bedside. Blanc's voice for Barney had changed considerably after the accident, going from the New Jersey accent to the deeper voice. Butler also occasionally voiced Barney on records throughout the 1960s and 1970s.

Lionel Wilson and Jackson Beck provided Barney's voice for two Flintstones record albums produced by Peter Pan Records in 1972–1975. John Stephenson voiced Barney on the Hanna-Barbera Educational Filmstrips. Rich Little voiced Barney in a cameo appearance in the film Better Off Dead. Since Blanc's death, Frank Welker, Jeff Bergman, Joe Alaskey, Keith Scott, Stephen Stanton, Kevin Michael Richardson, Scott Innes, Dave Coulier, Marc Silk, Brad Abrell, Wally Wingert, Paul F. Tompkins, and Jim Conroy have all performed the role. Hamilton Camp voiced Barney in The Flintstone Kids. In the scrapped series Bedrock, Barney was going to be voiced by Joe Lo Truglio.

In the 1994 live-action Flintstones movie, Barney was portrayed by Rick Moranis, who also provided his voice for the film's pinball adaptation. In the 2000 prequel, The Flintstones in Viva Rock Vegas, he was portrayed by Stephen Baldwin.
