= The Barkleys =

Television series

- Genre: Animation
- Created by: David H. DePatie; Friz Freleng; Joe Ruby; Ken Spears
- Written by: Larry Rhine; Woody Kling; Dennis Marks; David Evans
- Directed by: David Detiege
- Voices of: Henry Corden; Joan Gerber; Julie McWhirter; Steve Lewis; Gene Andrusco; Michael Bell; Bob Frank; Don Messick; Bob Holt; Frank Welker
- Composer: Doug Goodwin
- Country of origin: United States
- Original language: English
- No. of seasons: 1
- No. of episodes: 13

Production
- Producers: David H. DePatie; Friz Freleng
- Editors: Lee Gunther; Roger Donley; Allan R. Potter; Joe Siracusa; Rick Steward
- Camera setup: Ray Lee; Larry Hogan; John Burton, Jr.
- Running time: 30 minutes (20-22 minutes minus commercials)
- Production company: DePatie–Freleng Enterprises

Original release
- Network: NBC
- Release: September 9 – December 2, 1972

The Barkleys is an American animated television series produced by DePatie–Freleng Enterprises and distributed by Viacom, which aired on NBC from September 9 to December 2, 1972.

== Premise ==
Taking inspiration from the CBS sitcom All in the Family, the cartoon features an anthropomorphic family of dogs consisting of Arnie, a bus driver (voiced by Henry Corden), and his wife Agnes (voiced by Joan Gerber). They had two teenagers, Terry and Roger (voiced by Julie McWhirter and Steve Lewis respectively) and one younger child, Chester (voiced by Gene Andrusco).

The theme song's lyrics ended with the advice "Just remember Arnie Barkley's bark is worse than his bite". Doug Goodwin's theme song used part of "(Be It Ever So Humble) There's No Place Like Home".

== Staff ==
- Created for Television by David H. DePatie, Isadore "Friz" Freleng
- In Association With Joe Ruby, Ken Spears
- Writers: Larry Rhine, Woody Kling, Dennis Marks, David Evans
- Animation Director: David Detiege
- Storyboard Directors: Gerry Chiniquy, Art Leonardi, Cullen Houghtaling, Paul Sommer
- Layout Supervision and Design by Robert Taylor
- Layouts: Cullen Houghtaling, Owen Fitzgerald, Richard Ung, Frank M. Gonzales, Nino Carbe, Wes Herschensohn
- Animation: Don Williams, Manny Gould, Ken Muse, Norm McCabe, Warren Batchelder, Jim Davis, John Gibbs, Bob Richardson, Bob Matz, Bob Bransford, Reuben Timmins, Bob Bemiller
- Background Supervised by Richard H. Thomas, Mary O'Loughlin
- Film Editing Supervised by Lee Gunther
- Film Editors: Joe Siracusa, Allan R. Potter, Roger Donley, Rick Steward
- Title Design by Art Leonardi
- Music by Doug Goodwin
- Music Score Conducted by Eric Rogers
- Music Recording Engineer: Eric A. Tomlinson
- Executive in Charge of Production: Stan Paperny
- Production Supervision: Harry Love
- Camera: Ray Lee, Larry Hogan, John Burton Jr.
- Production Mixer: Steve Orr
- Sound by Producers' Sound Service, Inc.
- Associate Producers: Joe Ruby, Ken Spears
- Produced by David H. DePatie, Friz Freleng

== Voice cast ==
- Henry Corden as Arnie Barkley
- Joan Gerber as Agnes Barkley
- Julie McWhirter as Terry Barkley
- Gene Andrusco as Chester Barkley
- Steve Lewis as Roger Barkley
- Michael Bell, Bob Frank, Bob Holt, Don Messick, and Frank Welker as additional voices

== Episodes ==
No.	Title	Original release date
1	"Match Breaker"	September 9, 1972
Arnie unknowingly encounters Terry's new boyfriend, Chuck (whom he refused to pick up at the bus stop), and is in for a shocker when Chuck appears at the Barkley's household with a bouquet of flowers.
2	"Finders Weepers"	September 16, 1972
While walking home from work, Arnie finds $500 and plans to keep it. But after pressures from his wife and his conscience, he decided to give it back. Unfortunately, the kids unwittingly spent the money on their block party.
3	"Lib and Let Lib"	September 23, 1972
Following Terry's speech about women's rights at her high school, Arnie and Agnes decide to switch jobs for a day.
4	"Half-Pint Hero"	September 30, 1972
When Arnie gets the idea to try to make his non-athletic son, Chester, into a basketball star, it results in some embarrassment.
5	"No Place for a Lady"	October 7, 1972
Terry decides to enroll in a mechanic class. When her homework assignment involves taking apart her father’s car, she must scramble to get it back in working order before Arnie is due to pick up a senator from the airport.
6	"For the Love of Money"	October 14, 1972
Getting wind of his old classmate, Sammy Schnauzer, becoming a millionaire, Arnie does everything in his power to try to fix up Roger with Sammy's daughter, Elsie.
7	"Keeping Up with the Beagles"	October 21, 1972
Jealous of next-door neighbor Mr. Beagle's new swimming pool, Arnie enlists the help of his close friends to build a yacht in order to win back his family's attention.
8	"Play No Favorites"	October 28, 1972
When a heartbroken Chester feels left out in the family, he decides to run away and find a place where he’ll be appreciated.
9	"Law and Misorder"	November 4, 1972
Terry asks her parents for permission to spend a weekend away with her friends, but they have a hard time resisting the temptation to be overbearing and overprotective.
10	"The Great Disc Jockey"	November 11, 1972
Arnie takes to the airwaves trying to shows the kids what “good music” sounds like. It doesn’t take long before he realizes he may be out of touch.
11	"Barkley Beware"	November 18, 1972
When the Barkleys get stuck with an abandoned run-down mansion from a scheming salesman, Arnie must unload the property. However, things go from bad to worse when Arnie’s boss decides to take the property.
12	"Arnie Come Clean"	November 25, 1972
Arnie tries to overcome his fear of tests when the boss implements mandatory testing at the bus company.
13	"The Talent Agency Caper"	December 2, 1972
When the Barkleys catch the "fame bug", Arnie’s bank account catches a beating from a fraudulent talent scout.

== Airings ==
The series was broadcast by NBC from September 9 to December 2, 1972. NBC continued to air reruns until September 1, 1973. Only 13 episodes were produced.

== Home Media Releases ==
There wouldn't be any home media releases until October 2015, when Film Chest Media Group released a DVD, The Barkleys and The Houndcats – 2 DVD Classic Animation Set on DVD in Region 1. This collection features all 13 episodes of the series on DVD.
