= The Man Called Flintstone =

1966 film by William Hanna and Joseph Barbera

- Theatrical release poster
- Directed by: Joseph Barbera; William Hanna
- Screenplay by: Harvey Bullock; R. S. Allen
- Based on: The Flintstones by: William Hanna; Joseph Barbera
- Produced by: Joseph Barbera; William Hanna
- Starring: Alan Reed; Mel Blanc; Jean Vander Pyl; Gerry Johnson
- Cinematography: Dick Blundell; Gene Borghi; Charles Flekal; Bill Kotler
- Edited by: Larry C. Cowan; Pat Foley; David M. Horton; Milton Krear
- Music by: Ted Nichols; Marty Paich
- Production company: Hanna-Barbera Productions (Note: The rights to the individual characters are presently owned by Warner Bros.)
- Distributed by: Columbia Pictures
- Release date: August 3, 1966
- Running time: 89 minutes
- Country: United States
- Language: English

The Man Called Flintstone is a 1966 American animated musical spy-comedy film produced by Hanna-Barbera Productions and distributed by Columbia Pictures. The second film by Hanna-Barbera following Hey There, It's Yogi Bear! (1964), it was directed by series creators/studio founders William Hanna and Joseph Barbera from a screenplay by Harvey Bullock and R. S. Allen.

A theatrical spin-off of the 1960–66 television series The Flintstones, and a swan-song (series finale), produced immediately following the end of production, the film was released on August 5, 1966, just four months after the series ended. The working title was That Man Flintstone, with the film poster featuring Fred Flintstone in the same pose as actor James Coburn in the poster for the 1966 spy film Our Man Flint. The plot is a parody of spy films, primarily those featuring James Bond.

The film marked the first feature voice role for Gerry Johnson (Betty Rubble), and Henry Corden (Fred's singing voice), the latter of whom would go on to fully assume the role of Fred following Alan Reed's death in 1977. Despite numerous musical interludes, including one performed by Louis Prima, the series’ iconic theme song is absent.

== Plot ==
In the opening scene, a man physically identical to Fred Flintstone, later revealed to be secret agent Rock Slag, is being chased through Bedrock. His pursuers, Ali and Bobo, think that they have finally killed Slag when they push him off a building. Meanwhile, the Flintstones and Rubbles prepare for a camping vacation which includes trying to drop Dino and Hoppy off at the veterinarian. On the way back, Fred crashes Barney's car, and they make a stop at the hospital where Rock Slag is also recovering. After Ali and Bobo find Rock and put him out of commission, Chief Boulder of the Secret Service enlists Fred to take his place in Paris for a special meeting. His assignment is to meet Tanya, the #1 female lieutenant of master criminal the Green Goose, who has agreed to turn over the Green Goose in return for a chance to meet the irresistible Rock Slag. Rock is not sure that this is such a good idea but the Chief reassures him that he will keep an eye on Fred.

Thinking that the Green Goose is an actual bird, Fred tells his family that their vacation has become an all-expense-paid trip to Eurock. Barney and Fred return all the camping gear and use the money to buy the Rubbles tickets to go along. Meanwhile, Ali and Bobo make several attempts on Fred's life assuming that he is Rock Slag. Once in Paris, the Chief tells Fred that he must now go to Rome instead, with the help of master of disguise Triple X. Fred makes attempts to sneak away from Wilma to meet with Tanya, but ends up spending the night trying to escape all of Rock's female admirers. After missing a date with Wilma, Fred buys her a "genuine imitation diamond necklace" from a street hustler to make it up to her, but finds that she slept soundly through the night without even realizing that he was missing.

Discovering the Chief's secret office, Fred tries to back out of his assignment but after finding out what the Green Goose really is, he has pangs of guilt over Pebbles’ future and makes an excuse to get away and meet Tanya at a restaurant. Unfortunately, Wilma and the Rubbles go to the same restaurant and catch them together - thinking that Fred is having an affair. Rock actually shows up to replace Fred, but gets mistakenly pounded by an angry Wilma, Betty and Barney and ends up out of commission again. Tanya then leads Fred to the Green Goose (whose hideout is at an abandoned amusement park), but he is unaware that the Chief has been taken out by Ali and Bobo, so he has no back-up. Barney, meanwhile, has followed Fred to see what this is all about, and they both end up captured by the Green Goose. Barney is tortured in an effort to get Fred, who is believed to be Rock, to give him secret information. Fred refuses to talk, despite Barney's torture. Ali and Bobo show up and they tell Fred that the Chief got injured by them. They hand the Green Goose a note about a plan to launch missile to destroy the world.

Fred and Barney are locked in a tower and Fred explains the whole situation to Barney by telling him that he was actually filling in for Rock because of his resemblance to him. Fred and Barney escape the tower. Fred bumps into Triple X, one of his disguises falls out of his pocket which is actually the Green Goose's mask. Triple X then reveals himself as the Green Goose and then makes plans to launch his deadly inter-rockinental missile, which is disguised as the park's space ride. Fred and Barney accidentally lock themselves inside the missile until Triple X overhears that Fred has an "expensive" necklace on him. When he offers to release them in exchange for it and opens the door, the boys turn the tables on Triple X and lock him in the missile with Ali, Bobo and Tanya—with the target now reset for outer space, sending them all to an unknown fate.

A huge welcome-home ceremony is held in Bedrock for the return of Fred, whom now is considered a hero, but he is just grateful to be back home with his family (after the restaurant mishap is cleared up), who head on a secret getaway. As Fred and Barney relax on a fishing trip, Roberta, one of Rock's admirers whom Fred met in Rome, and her brother Mario appear behind them and chase Fred, whom they think is Rock Slag, all over town, much to the confusion of Wilma, Barney, and Betty.

== Cast ==
- Alan Reed as Fred Flintstone
  - Henry Corden provides Fred's singing voice
- Mel Blanc as Barney Rubble, Dino, French Cabbie, Mayor of Bedrock
- Jean Vander Pyl as Wilma Flintstone, Pebbles Flintstone
- Gerry Johnson as Betty Rubble
- Don Messick as Hoppy, Dr. Moonstone, Recorder Bird, Ferocious
- Janet Waldo as Roberta
- Paul Frees as Triple X, Green Goose, Bobo, Rock Slag, Mario
- Harvey Korman as Chief Boulder, Ali, Street Salesman
- John Stephenson as Veterinarian, Airport Clerk
- June Foray as Tanya

== Soundtrack ==
The Man Called Flintstone (Music From The Original Motion Picture Soundtrack)

Soundtrack album
- Released: 1966
- Recorded: 1966
- Genre: Soundtrack
- Label: Hanna-Barbera Records
- Producer: Charles Shows

The Man Called Flintstone soundtrack album was released on vinyl by Hanna-Barbera Records.

Side A:

1. "The Man Called Flintstone" (Instrumental)
2. "Spy Chief" (Instrumental)
3. "Spy Type Guy"
4. "Bobo and Ali" (Instrumental)
5. "Team Mates"
6. "Paris Bound" (Instrumental)

Side B:

1. "(Someday) When I Am Grown Up"
2. "The Happy Sounds of Pareé"
3. "Pensate Amore (Think Love)"
4. "Scooter Scootin'" (Instrumental)
5. "Tickle Toddle"
6. "The Man Called Flintstone"

== Reception ==
Variety gave The Man Called Flintstone a positive review on August 10, 1966, calling the production "excellent" and noting that the "stone-age scenery and machinery are mildly amusing and sometimes highly inventive". The review judges the plot to be a fast-moving and clever spoof of contemporary spy films.

== Home media ==
Hanna-Barbera Home Video released the film on VHS on January 26, 1989. A DVD release of the film was announced by Warner Home Video on August 25, 2004, for a December 7 release date to coincide with the third season DVD, but the film's DVD release was delayed. On March 22, 2005, Warner Home Video released the film on DVD in Canada. This edition was re-released by Warner Home Video in the United States on December 2, 2008, along with Hanna-Barbera's 1964 feature Hey There, It's Yogi Bear!.

In 2010, the film was made available in HD via video on demand outlets, such as the iTunes Store and Amazon Prime Video. Unlike the DVD release (which is 4:3 open matte), the streaming version is presented in a more accurate widescreen aspect ratio of 1.78:1.

The Man Called Flintstone was included in the DVD collection The Flintstones: 2 Movies & 2 Specials on August 4, 2020, and later as a bonus feature on the Blu-ray boxset The Flintstones: The Complete Series in October 2020. In these releases, the film is in its widescreen aspect ratio of 1.78:1, and is only in standard definition on both the DVD and Blu-ray.

== See also ==
- List of American films of 1966
