= Wilma Flintstone =

Fictional character in the animated TV series The Flintstones

- The Flintstones character
- First appearance: "The Flagstones" (1959)
- Created by: William Hanna; Joseph Barbera
- Voiced by: Jean Vander Pyl (1959–1999); B. J. Baker (1962); Julie McWhirter/Elizabeth Lyn Fraser (The Flintstone Kids); Tress MacNeille (2000–present); Amy Sedaris (Bedrock)
- Portrayed by: Elizabeth Perkins (1994 film); Kristen Johnston (2000 film)

In-universe information
- Full name: Wilma Anna Flintstone
- Species: Cavewoman
- Gender: Female
- Occupation: Housewife; Newspaper reporter Caterer
- Family: Pearl Slaghoople (mother); Ricky Slaghoople (father); Mica Slaghoople (sister); Mickey Slaghoople (sister); Jerry Slaghoople (brother); Roxy Rubble (granddaughter); Chip Rubble (grandson); Bamm-Bamm Rubble (son-in-law)
- Spouse: Fred Flintstone (husband)
- Children: Pebbles Flintstone (daughter); Stoney Flintstone (adoptive son)

Wilma Anna Flintstone is a fictional character in the television animated series The Flintstones. Wilma is married to Fred Flintstone, daughter of Pearl Slaghoople, and mother of Pebbles Flintstone. Her best friend is her next door neighbor, Betty Rubble.

Wilma's personality is based on that of Alice Kramden, married to Ralph Kramden on the 1950s television series The Honeymooners. Much like Alice, Wilma plays the strong-willed, level-headed person in her marriage, often criticizing Fred for pursuing his various ill-fated schemes. Wilma is often the one to bail out Fred when one of his schemes lands him in trouble or brings up the problem.

== Fictional character biography ==
Similar to Fred Flintstone's family, Wilma came from "Arkanstone". As a young adult, Wilma worked with Betty as a cigarette girl/waitress at a resort. There, they first met and fell in love with their future husbands, Fred and Barney, who were working there as bellhops.

Wilma and Fred eventually married, and Wilma became a homemaker, keeping house with such prehistoric aids as a baby elephant vacuum cleaner and pelican washing machine. Wilma is a good cook; one of her specialties is "gravelberry pie", the recipe for which she eventually sold to the "Safestone" supermarket chain. Wilma also enjoys volunteering for various charitable and women's organizations in Bedrock, shopping, and occasionally getting to meet the celebrities of their world, including Stony Curtis, Rock Quarry, and Jimmy Darrock. Despite her petite appearance Wilma is quite capable of causing havoc when angry, at times knocking a prizefighter out with one blow, knocking out crooks with her stone purse or striking Fred Flintstone with a club or a frying pan. Wilma is a truly modest woman however her obvious beauty and attractiveness has been referenced from time to time, especially in the season 2 episode "The Beauty Contest", where she and Betty entered a beauty contest.

In the original series' third season, Wilma becomes pregnant and gives birth to the couple's only child, Pebbles.

When Pebbles is a teenager, Wilma gains employment as a reporter for one of Bedrock's newspapers, the Daily Granite (a spoof of the Daily Planet of Superman fame), under editor Lou Granite (a parody of The Mary Tyler Moore Show's Lou Grant). While employed there, Wilma shares various adventures with prehistoric superhero Captain Caveman, who, in a secret identity, also works for the newspaper.

Later still, after Pebbles grows up and leaves home, Wilma starts a successful catering business with her neighbor and friend Betty, before becoming a grandmother to Pebbles' twin children, Chip and Roxy.

== Maiden name ==
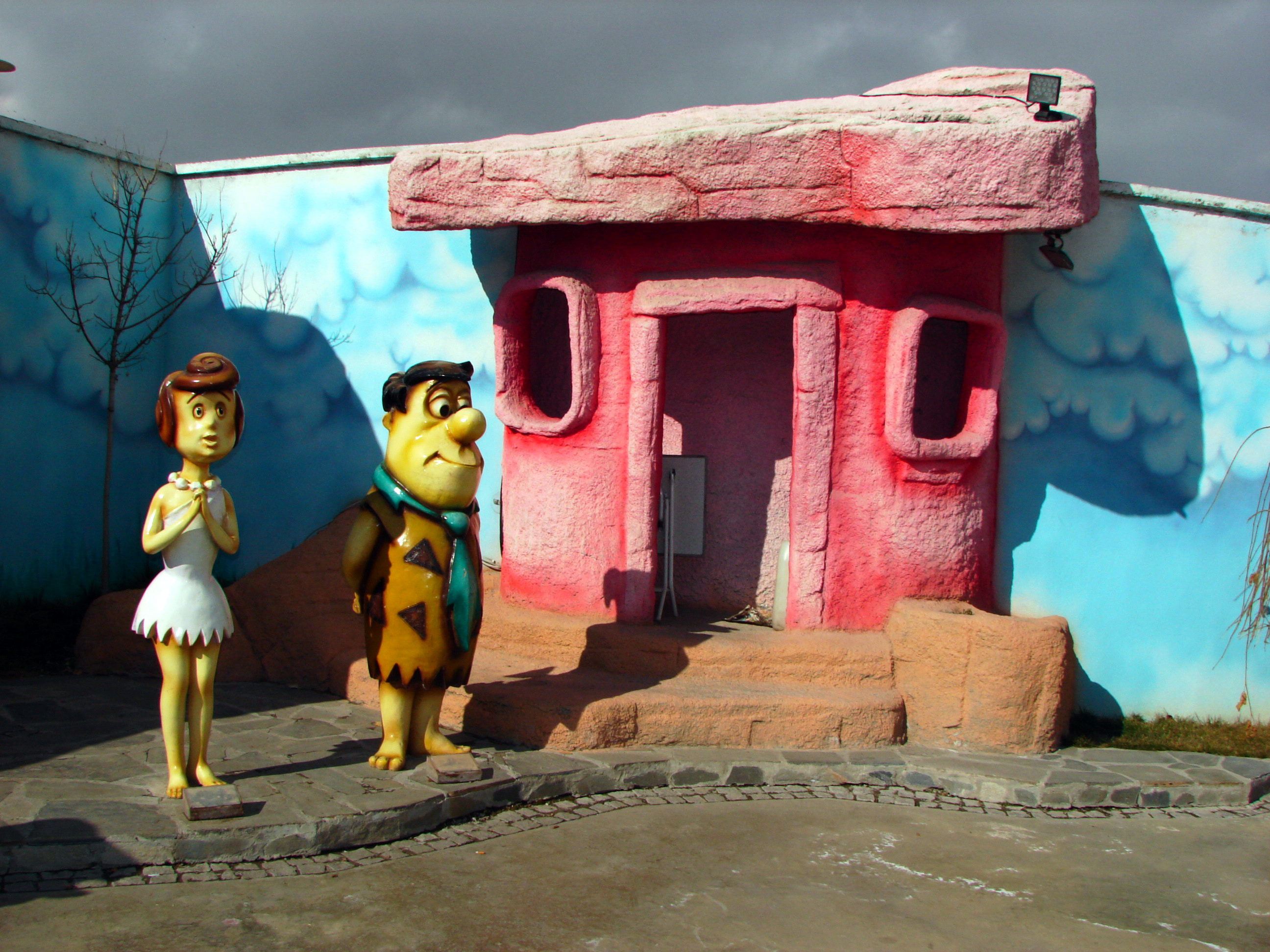
Wilma and Fred figurines at the Ankara Amusement Park

Wilma's maiden name is the subject of a continuity error. Several early episodes in the original series clearly stated Wilma's maiden name was "Pebble". In the second-season episode "The Entertainer", Wilma's old friend Greta Gravel remembers her as "Wilma Pebble", and in the third-season episode "Dial S for Suspicion", one of Wilma's old boyfriends calls her "Wilma Pebble".

However, later episodes and spin-offs say her maiden name is "Slaghoople", based on the name of Wilma's mother in the original series, Pearl Slaghoople. Flintstones writer Earl Kress said: "Unfortunately, it's just as simple as [Hanna-Barbera] not caring about the continuity."

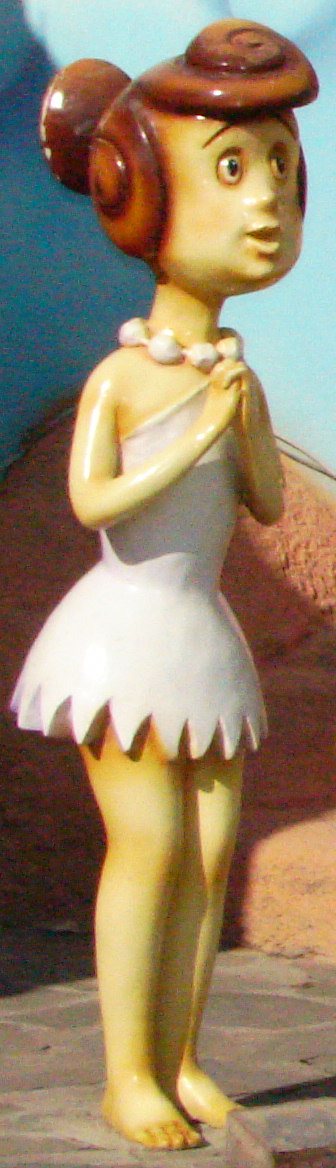
Wilma figurine

== Portrayal ==
Jean Vander Pyl was the original voice artist of Wilma and played the role until her death in 1999, after which Tress MacNeille took over as Wilma's voice.

In The Flintstone Kids, Wilma was voiced by Julie McWhirter Dees and Elizabeth Lyn Frasier at different points.

In the live-action film The Flintstones, Wilma was played by Elizabeth Perkins. Vander Pyl made a cameo at Fred's surprise party (in the conga line behind Dino). In the prequel film The Flintstones in Viva Rock Vegas, Wilma was played by Kristen Johnston.

In the scrapped series Bedrock, Wilma was going to be voiced by Amy Sedaris.

=== Additional voice actors ===
- B. J. Baker (singing voice in the episode "The Happy Housewife")
- Gerry Johnson (Busch advertisement)
- Corinne Orr (Peter Pan Records The Flintstones LP)
- Susan Boyd (The Flintstones Present: Bedrock Hop)
- Caroline Sellers (The 1st 13th Annual Fancy Anvil Awards Program Special...Live!...In Stereo!)
- Deborah Sale Butler (Fruity Pebbles campaign, "Bedrock Superstar")

=== Parodies ===
- Penny Marshall (The New Show)
- Tara Strong (Drawn Together)
- Lisa Sundstedt (Robot Chicken)
- Alex Borstein (Family Guy)
- Mae Whitman (Robot Chicken)
- Seth Green (Robot Chicken)

== Animated media ==
=== Television shows ===
- The Flagstones (1959)
- The Flintstones (1960–1966)
- The Pebbles and Bamm-Bamm Show (1971–1972)
- The Flintstone Comedy Hour (1972–1974)
- Fred Flintstone and Friends (1977–1978)
- The New Fred and Barney Show (1979)
- Fred and Barney Meet the Thing (1979)
- Fred and Barney Meet the Shmoo (1979–1980)
- The Flintstone Comedy Show (1980–1982)
- The Flintstone Funnies (1982–1984)
- The Flintstone Kids, voiced by Julie McWhirter Dees and Elizabeth Lyn Frasier (1986–1988)
- The Simpsons, in the couch gag for "Kamp Krusty" (1992) and in "Beyond Blunderdome" (1999)
- What a Cartoon!, featuring Dino: Stay Out! (1995)
- The Weird Al Show, "Talent Show" episode (1997)
- The Rubbles (2002)
- Harvey Birdman, Attorney at Law, in "The Dabba Don" (2002)
- Drawn Together, in "The One Wherein There Is a Big Twist, Part II" (2005)
- Family Guy, in "Peter's Daughter" voiced by Alex Borstein (2007)
- Robot Chicken
- Yabba Dabba Dinosaurs (2020)
- Animaniacs, cameo in "Suffragette City" (2020)
- Jellystone!
- Teen Titans Go!, cameo in "Warner Bros. 100th Anniversary" (2023)
- Bedrock (cancelled)

=== Films and specials ===
- The Man Called Flintstone (1966)
- The Flintstones on Ice (1973)
- Energy: A National Issue (1977)
- A Flintstone Christmas (1977)
- The Flintstones: Little Big League (1978)
- The Flintstones' New Neighbors (1980)
- The Flintstones Meet Rockula and Frankenstone (1980)
- The Flintstones: Fred's Final Fling (1980)
- The Flintstones: Jogging Fever (1981)
- The Flintstones: Wind-Up Wilma (1981)
- The Flintstones' 25th Anniversary Celebration (1986)
- The Jetsons Meet the Flintstones (1987)
- The Flintstone Kids' "Just Say No" Special (1988)
- A Yabba Dabba Doo Celebration: 50 Years of Hanna-Barbera (1989)
- I Yabba-Dabba Do! (1993), voiced by Jean Vander Pyl
- Hollyrock-a-Bye Baby (1993)
- A Flintstone Family Christmas (1993)
- The Flintstones, portrayed by Elizabeth Perkins (1994)
- A Flintstones Christmas Carol (1994)
- The Flintstones in Viva Rock Vegas, portrayed by Kristen Johnston (2000)
- The Flintstones: On the Rocks, voiced by Tress MacNeille (2001)
- The Flintstones & WWE: Stone Age SmackDown! (2015)
- Space Jam: A New Legacy (2021)
