= The Flintstones' 25th Anniversary Celebration =

- Genre: Animation; Live action Comedy; Variety show
- Written by: Tom Ruegger; John K. Ludin; Charles M. Howell IV
- Directed by: Robert Guenette
- Presented by: Tim Conway; Harvey Korman; Vanna White
- Voices of: Henry Corden; Jean Vander Pyl; Daws Butler
- Composer: Hoyt Curtin
- Country of origin: United States
- Original language: English

Production
- Executive producers: William Hanna; Joseph Barbera
- Producers: Robert Guenette; Peter Wood
- Running time: 60 minutes
- Production companies: Hanna-Barbera Productions; Robert Guenette Productions

Original release
- Network: CBS
- Release: May 20, 1986

Related
- The Flintstone Kids' "Just Say No" Special

The Flintstones' 25th Anniversary Celebration is a 1986 American live-action/animated television special produced by Hanna-Barbera Productions in association with Robert Guenette Productions, which premiered on CBS on May 20, 1986. Hosted by special guests Tim Conway, Harvey Korman, and Vanna White, the program commemorated the 25th anniversary of television's first prime time animated series The Flintstones featuring clips from the show's many episodes and its spin-offs with new animation and musical segments.

== Voice cast ==
- Henry Corden as Fred Flintstone
- Jean Vander Pyl as Wilma Flintstone
- Daws Butler as Yogi Bear, Huckleberry Hound, Quick Draw McGraw

== Special appearances ==
- Joseph Barbera
- William Hanna
- The cast of Kate & Allie: Susan Saint James, Jane Curtin, Ari Meyers, Allison Smith, Frederick Koehler
- Ed McMahon
- Telly Savalas
- Sting
- Dr. Ruth Westheimer (Dr. Ruth)

== Nielsen ratings ==
The special brought in an 11.2 rating and a 19 share, coming in third in its timeslot, and ranking 39th out of 62 programs airing that week.
