= The Flintstones on Ice =

- Written by: Eli Basse
- Directed by: Walter C. Miller
- Starring: Donald McPherson; Gudrun Hauss; Walter Häfner; Cliff McArdle; Guy Longpré
- Voices of: Alan Reed; Mel Blanc; Jean Vander Pyl; Gay Hartwig
- Country of origin: United States
- Original language: English

Production
- Executive producer: Joseph Cates
- Producer: Walter C. Miller
- Production locations: Hamburg, Germany
- Running time: 60 minutes
- Production company: Phillip Productions

Original release
- Network: CBS
- Release: February 11, 1973

The Flintstones on Ice is a 1973 American live action television special featuring characters from The Flintstones franchise created by Hanna-Barbera, directed by Walter C. Miller and produced in association with Gyula Trebitsch/Studio Hamburg by Phillip Productions. It premiered on CBS on February 11, 1973.

== Synopsis ==
The special was taped in Hamburg, Germany before a capacity crowd and starred costumed characters of Fred Flintstone, Wilma Flintstone, Barney Rubble and Betty Rubble (portrayed by champion ice skaters Lothar Dobberstein, Teri Tucker, Malcolm Smith and Mitsuko Funakoshi, respectively). Also featured are renowned skaters Donald McPherson, Cliff McArdle, Gudrun Hauss and Walter Häfner.

The special shows The Flintstones characters interacting with the other ice-skaters displaying winter-themed performances, elaborate costumes and German-theme pieces which concludes with a big finale as the four characters perform the closing number together, joined by the others in Germanic costumes.

== Flintstones cast ==
Character	Costumed actor	Voice actor
Fred Flintstone	Lothar Dobberstein	Alan Reed
Wilma Flintstone	Teri Tucker	Jean Vander Pyl
Barney Rubble	Malcolm Smith	Mel Blanc
Betty Rubble	Mitsuko Funakoshi	Gay Hartwig
