= The Flintstones: Bedrock Bowling =

2000 video game

- Developer: Adrenalin Entertainment
- Publishers: EU: Ubi Soft; NA: SouthPeak Interactive (PS)
- Platforms: PlayStation, Windows
- Release: July 28, 2000: Windows; UK: July 28, 2000 PlayStation; PAL: August 18, 2000; NA: September 19, 2000
- Genre: Sports action
- Mode: Single-player

The Flintstones: Bedrock Bowling is a bowling game developed by Adrenalin Interactive and published by SouthPeak Interactive (In Europe, the game was co-published by Ubi Soft) which was released in Europe and North America in 2000. The game is available on PlayStation and Windows.

== Gameplay ==
The characters are in a giant hollowed out bowling ball, controlling it while trying to knock the pins spread throughout the level. The player has to avoid obstacles without extra frames to try again. All in one shot they must knock all the pins down.

== Reception ==
Reception

Aggregate score
Aggregator	Score
GameRankings	39%

Review scores
Publication	Score
AllGame	2.5/5
CNET Gamecenter	5/10
Electronic Gaming Monthly	0.5/10
EP Daily	5/10
Game Informer	3.5/10
GamePro	3/5
GameRevolution	D−
GameSpot	2.7/10
Next Generation	1/5
PlayStation Official Magazine – UK	1/10
Official U.S. PlayStation Magazine	1/5
PC Zone	16%

The PlayStation version received unfavorable reviews according to the review aggregation website GameRankings. Jeff Lundrigan of NextGen said that the game was "So bad, we're tempted to buy up copies just to protect some unsuspecting child from picking it up." GamePro gave it a mixed review, and GameRevolution gave it an overwhelming dislike, over a month before the game was released Stateside.
