= Alan Reed =

American actor (1907–1977)

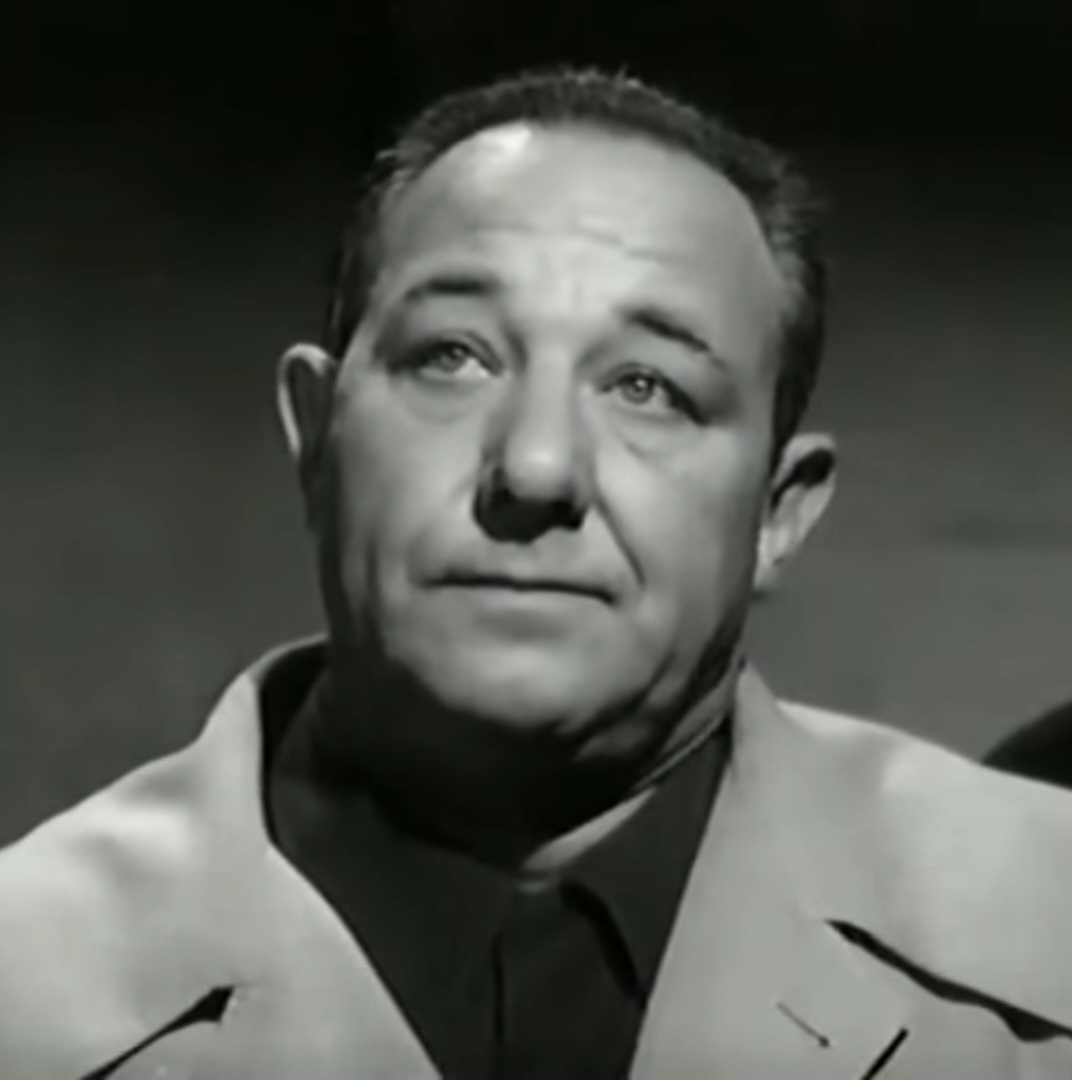
- Reed in Time Table (1956)
- Born: Herbert Theodore Bergman; August 20, 1907; New York City, U.S.
- Died: June 14, 1977 (aged 69); Los Angeles, California, U.S.
- Other names: Alan Reed Sr. Teddy Bergman
- Education: American Academy of Dramatic Arts; Columbia University
- Occupation: Actor
- Years active: 1930–1977
- Spouse: Finnette Walker (m. 1932)
- Children: 3

Alan Reed (born Herbert Theodore Bergman; August 20, 1907 – June 14, 1977) was an American actor, best known as the original voice of Fred Flintstone on The Flintstones and various spinoff series. He also appeared in many films, including Days of Glory, The Tarnished Angels, Breakfast at Tiffany's, Viva Zapata! and Nob Hill, as well as several television and radio series.

== Early life ==
Herbert Theodore Bergman was born on August 20, 1907, in New York City to Jewish parents. His father was a Lithuanian-Jewish immigrant and his mother was born in the United States to Ukrainian-Jewish parents from Galicia. He attended George Washington High School (now George Washington Educational Campus) and majored in journalism at Columbia University.

Between graduating from WHS and entering Columbia, he studied drama at the American Academy of Dramatic Arts. He began his acting career in the city, eventually working on Broadway.

For several years, Reed toured in vaudeville with his cousin, Harry Green. He also had two other jobs—operating a wholesale candy factory and working at the Copake Country Club as social director, entertainment producer and actor.

In his earlier roles, Reed was often billed under his real name, as "Teddy Bergman." According to his obituary in The New York Times, he adopted his stage name "to break the trap of his Jewish identity, which he later said limited his early roles to parts in which he mimicked ethnic accents."

== Career ==
=== Radio ===
As early as 1930, Reed (billed as Teddy Bergman) co-starred with Herbert Polesie in Henry and George, a CBS program that featured minute dramas and popular comedies interspersed with dance music selections.

Reed's radio work included having two roles in Valiant Lady, the role of Solomon Levy on Abie's Irish Rose, as the "Allen's Alley" resident poet Falstaff Openshaw on Fred Allen's NBC radio show, and later on his own five-minute show, Falstaff's Fables, on ABC, as Officer Clancey and other occasional roles on the NBC radio show Duffy's Tavern, as Shrevey the driver on several years of The Shadow, as Chester Riley's boss on the NBC radio show The Life of Riley, as Italian immigrant Pasquale in Life with Luigi on CBS radio, various supporting roles on Yours Truly, Johnny Dollar and The Phil Harris-Alice Faye Show, and as Lt. Walter Levinson in several episodes of Richard Diamond, Private Detective.

Reed was heard regularly on the Crime Doctor series, and was the original Daddy to Fanny Brice on Baby Snooks. Billed as Teddy Bergman, he had the title role on Joe Palooka.

=== Stage ===
Billed as Teddy Bergman, Reed appeared on Broadway in Double Dummy (1936), A House in the Country (1937), and Love's Old Sweet Song (1940).

=== Television ===
From 1957 to 1958, Reed appeared in a recurring role as J.B. Hafter, a studio boss, on the CBS sitcom Mr. Adams and Eve. He also played the same character in The Bob Cummings Show. In 1963, he appeared as Councilman Jack Gramby in episode 8 of the CBS sitcom My Favorite Martian. In 1964–65, he had a recurring role as Mr. Swidler in the ABC sitcom Mickey.

=== Voice acting ===
In animation, Reed provided the voice of Boris the Russian Wolfhound in Walt Disney's Lady and the Tramp in 1955. In 1960, he began the voice role for Fred Flintstone, the lead character of Hanna-Barbera's prime-time animated series The Flintstones. Reed provided Fred's voice for the entire six-season run of the show, as well as in several spin-off series (The Pebbles and Bamm-Bamm Show, The Flintstone Comedy Hour) and specials. His final performance as Fred Flintstone was a cameo guest role on an episode of Scooby's All-Star Laff-A-Lympics. Afterwards, Fred would be voiced by Henry Corden (who had previously done voice work for Hanna-Barbera and bore a resemblance to Reed). Reed's other voice roles for Hanna-Barbera was Touché Turtle's sidekick, Dum Dum.

Radio playwright and director Norman Corwin cast Reed as Santa Claus in the 1969 KCET television reading of his 1938 play The Plot to Overthrow Christmas.

In television commercials Reed was the voice over for J.J. Keebler, a creation of the Leo Burnett Agency.

== Personal life ==
In May 1932, Reed married Finette Walker (1909–2005), a Broadway actress whom he met at television station W2XAB (later WCBS-TV) in New York City. She appeared on stage in the early 1930s and was a chorus member in the original 1934 Broadway production of Anything Goes with Ethel Merman. They had three sons, including actor Alan Reed, Jr. (born 1936).

== Death ==
Reed, a heavy smoker, was diagnosed with bladder cancer in 1967. The cancer was treated surgically, but he later developed emphysema. On June 14, 1977, he died at St. Vincent Medical Center (Los Angeles) after having a heart attack, two months before his 70th birthday.

== Filmography ==
=== Film ===
Year	Title	Role	Notes
1937	Teddy Bergman's Bar-B-Q	Teddy Bergman	
1944	Days of Glory	Sasha	
1945	Nob Hill	Dapper Jack Harrigan	
1946	The Postman Always Rings Twice	Ezra Liam Kennedy	
1950	Perfect Strangers	Harry Patullo	
1950	Emergency Wedding	Barber	
1951	The Redhead and the Cowboy	Colonel Lamartine	
1951	Here Comes the Groom	Walter Godfrey	
1952	Viva Zapata!	Pancho Villa	
1952	Actor's and Sin	J.B. Cobb	Segment "Woman of Sin"
1953	Pickup on South Street	Detective	Uncredited
1953	I, the Jury	George Kalecki	
1953	Geraldine	Frederick Sterling	
1954	Woman's World	Tomaso	
1955	The Far Horizons	Charboneau	
1955	Lady and the Tramp	Boris (voice)	
1955	Kiss of Fire	Sergeant Diego	
1955	The Desperate Hours	Detective	
1956	Time Table	Al Wolfe	
1956	The Revolt of Mamie Stover	Captain Gorecki	
1956	He Laughed Last	Big Dan Hennessy	
1957	The Tarnished Angels	Colonel Fineman	
1958	Marjorie Morningstar	Puddles Podell	
1959	1001 Arabian Nights	The Sultan (voice)	
1960	Stop! Look! and Laugh	Prince (voice)	Uncredited
1961	Breakfast at Tiffany's	Sally Tomato	
1965	Printed Poison	Unnamed Judge (uncredited)	Anti-pornography documentary film produced by the "Center for Decent Literature"
1966	The Man Called Flintstone	Fred Flintstone (voice)	
1969	A Dream of Kings	Fig King	
1971	Shinbone Alley	Big Bill (voice)	
1975	The Story of Heidi	Sebastian, Mr. Usher	Final role, 1979 English dub
1978	The Seniors	Professor Heigner	Final role, posthumous release
2005	Son of the Mask	Fred Flintstone	Archival footage

=== Television ===
Year	Title	Role	Notes
1956	Alfred Hitchcock Presents	Uncle Leo	Season 2 Episode 7: "Alibi Me"
1957–1958	Mr. Adams and Eve	J. B. Hafter	Regular cast
1958	Make Room for Daddy	Joe Ferbus	Episode: "The Reunion"
1959	Have Gun – Will Travel	Dirks the Clamjumper	Episode: "Gold and Brimstone"
1960	Peter Gunn	Garson	Episode: "The Maître d"
1960	Make Room for Daddy	Howard Sloan	Episode: "The Apple Polishers"
1960–1966	The Flintstones	Fred Flintstone, Professor Von Messerschmidt, J.L. Gothrocks, The Prowler, Grandpa Rocky Flintstone (voices)	166 episodes
1962–1963	The Hanna-Barbera New Cartoon Series	Dum Dum (voice)	52 episodes
1963	Don't Call Me Charlie!	Private Winthrop Fairchild	Episode: "Raise Your Right Hand"
1963	The Dick Van Dyke Show	Auctioneer	Episode: "The Masterpiece"
1963	My Favorite Martian	Councilman Jack Gramby	Episode: "The Awful Truth"
1964	Hoppity Hooper	Filmore Bear, Additional voices	Episode: "Ring-A-Ding Spring"
1964–1965	Jonny Quest	various characters	various episodes
1964, 1968	The Beverly Hillbillies	Gene Booth	Episodes: "Teenage Idol", "The Great Tag-Team Match"
1965	The Addams Family	Parks Commissioner Fiske (Uncredited)	Episode: "Cousin Itt Visits the Addams Family"
1966	Space Ghost	Glasstor	Episode: "Glasstor"
1966	Alice in Wonderland or What's a Nice Kid Like You Doing in a Place Like This?	Fred Flintstone (voice)	Television film
1966	The Impossibles	Smogula	1 episode
1967	Batman	General MacGruder	Episode: "Penguin Sets a Trend"
1968	Petticoat Junction	The Bandit	Episode: "Bad Day at Shady Rest"
1969	Get Smart	Little girl (voice)	Uncredited
1970	Where's Huddles?	Mad Dog Mahoney (voice)	10 episodes
1971	The Pebbles and Bamm-Bamm Show	Fred Flintstone (voice)	16 episodes
1972–1974	The Flintstone Comedy Hour	Fred Flintstone (voice)	18 episodes
1973	The Flintstones on Ice	Fred Flintstone (voice)	Television film
1975	The Story of Heidi	Sebastian, Mr. Usher (voices)	English version
1977	Laff-A-Lympics	Fred Flintstone (voice)	
1977	Energy: A National Issue	Fred Flintstone (voice)	Television film
1977–1980	Captain Caveman and the Teen Angels	Additional voices	39 episodes Final television role

=== Radio ===
Year	Title	Role	Notes
1930	Henry and George		
1932	Joe Palooka	Joe Palooka	
1938	Valiant Lady	Various roles	
1939	The Campbell Playhouse: Twentieth Century		
1940	The Baby Snooks Show	Daddy	
1940–1947	Crime Doctor		
1942	Abie's Irish Rose	Solomon Levy	
1944–1951	Duffy's Tavern	Officer Clancy, various characters	
1944–1951	The Life of Riley	Chester Riley's boss	
1948–1953	Life with Luigi	Pasquale	
1948–1954	The Phil Harris-Alice Faye Show	Various roles	
1949–1962	Yours Truly, Johnny Dollar	Various roles	
1949–1953	Richard Diamond, Private Detective	Lieutenant Walter Levinson	

=== Stage ===
Year	Title	Role	Notes
1936	Dounle Dummy	Various characters	Broadway
1937	A House in the Country	Various characters	Broadway
1940	Love Old Sweet Song	Various characters	Broadway
