= List of Courage the Cowardly Dog characters =

Courage the Cowardly Dog characters list

This is a list of characters from the Cartoon Network animated series Courage the Cowardly Dog.

== Main characters ==
=== Courage ===
Courage

Courage (voiced by Howard Hoffman in the pilot, Marty Grabstein in the series, "The Fog of Courage", and Straight Outta Nowhere: Scooby-Doo! Meets Courage the Cowardly Dog) is the titular character and protagonist of the series. He is a kind yet easily frightened pink-furred dog who was abandoned as a puppy after his parents were sent into outer space, but was adopted by Muriel Bagge. Her husband Eustace regularly mistreats him. Despite this, Courage is determined to protect his owners when necessary. Courage is also very clever and resourceful when the situation demands it, outsmarting the villains most of the time. Aiding him in saving the day is a self-aware, sarcastic, and seemingly omniscient computer that he keeps in the attic. He got his name when Muriel found him as a puppy alone in an alley and remarked that he must be quite brave to be there by himself. He can communicate verbally with other animals and various supernatural beings, but not with humans.

=== Muriel Bagge ===
Muriel Bagge

Muriel Bagge (voiced by Howard Hoffman in the pilot, Thea White in the series, "The Fog of Courage", and Straight Outta Nowhere: Scooby-Doo! Meets Courage the Cowardly Dog, and Kath Soucie as a child) is Courage's owner and Eustace's wife. She is a kind, hardworking Scottish woman who took Courage in when he was an abandoned puppy. Muriel often carries a rolling pin that she hits Eustace with whenever he harasses Courage. She also likes tea and usually tends to her garden, as well as being an accomplished sitar player. Muriel also has a great fondness for cooking; however, her recipes tend to include an excessive amount of vinegar, much to the distaste of both her dog and husband. Most of all, she loves sitting in her rocking chair with Courage on her lap and watching television. Due to her kindness and sweet nature, Muriel is an easy (and often attractive) target for villains.

=== Eustace Bagge ===
Eustace Bagge

Eustace Bagge (voiced by Howard Hoffman in the pilot, Lionel Wilson from episodes 1–33, Arthur Anderson in episodes 34–52, Wallace Shawn in "The Fog of Courage", Jeff Bergman in Straight Outta Nowhere: Scooby-Doo! Meets Courage the Cowardly Dog) is Muriel's husband. He is a skinny, selfish, greedy, cynical, and sarcastic elderly American man who is obsessed with his vintage truck. Eustace is the current owner of the farmhouse, which was previously owned by his now-deceased brother Horst. Eustace regularly yells at Courage and calls him a "stupid dog". He regularly dismisses Muriel as well, but he still does love his wife, as evidenced by his concern for her well-being in several episodes, like "The Demon in the Mattress".

Lionel Wilson originally voiced the character, but left midway through the third season due to illness. Wilson eventually died five months after the series ended.

== Supporting characters ==
=== The Computer ===
The Computer (voiced by Simon Prebble in the series, Paul Schoeffler in "Everyone Wants to Direct" and "The Fog of Courage", Jeff Bergman in Straight Outta Nowhere: Scooby-Doo! Meets Courage the Cowardly Dog) is a computer that resides in the Bagge farm's attic and offers Courage advice on how to deal with crazy situations. It has a sarcastic personality and a habit of regularly cracking jokes in any situation. It also appears to often provide Courage with unhelpful advice, but it's nevertheless supportive of him.

=== Doctor Vindaloo ===
Doctor Vindaloo (voiced by Paul Schoeffler) is an Indian doctor with a thick accent, whom Eustace and Muriel see when something is wrong. He is one of the few characters in the series who can perfectly understand what Courage is trying to say. He diagnoses his patients as not having serious problems or that there is nothing that he can do, but has, on occasion, been a great help. Vindaloo is one of the few characters Courage considers a friend and trusts enough to confide in.

=== Shirley the Medium ===
Shirley the Medium (voiced by Mary Testa) is a small green Chihuahua garbed as a stereotypical Gypsy fortune-teller who resides in a dilapidated caravan. She has a strong dislike of Eustace because of his greed and selfishness. Shirley is one of Courage's three confidants, the others being the Computer and Dr. Vindaloo, and helps him occasionally by casting and reciting spells and playing the saxophone in-between verses.

=== General Horton and Lieutenant Gidley ===
General Horton and Lieutenant Gidley (respectively voiced by Ron McLarty and Chuck Montgomery) are military officers who are stationed in Nowhere. They often appear in episodes involving government operations in which Courage has to solve for himself, due to the duo distracting themselves with their continuous fighting with cartoonish violence.

== Villains ==
=== The Chicken from Outer Space ===
The Chicken from Outer Space (voiced by Howard Hoffman) is the show's first villain, introduced by the pilot episode of the same name. His eggs are mutagenic and transform whoever eats them into a chicken. In his first appearance, the Chicken tries to take over the farm, but ends up being shot by his own laser gun, blowing off his head and roasting his body. The Chicken returns in "The Revenge of the Chicken from Outer Space", where he intends to rip off Courage's head to replace his own. He ends up ripping off Eustace's head and tries to destroy Courage, but is then blown up in his spaceship when a rocket blasts into it. In "Son of the Chicken from Outer Space", the Chicken's son is sent to Earth to avenge him and kill Courage. However, the Chicken fears that he will not be able to return home until Courage is dead. Feeling sympathy for the Chicken, Courage helps him by faking his own death.

=== Katz ===
Katz (voiced by Paul Schoeffler) is a sadistic red tabby cat with a British accent. He is Courage's nemesis and the show's most recurring main antagonist, though Muriel and Eustace consistently fail to recognize him. He specializes in scam businesses and is extremely sadistic. Many of his businesses involve torturing or outright killing his customers. All of his businesses enforce a strict "No Dogs Allowed" policy, forcing Courage to sneak in. He often challenges Courage to ironically banal games such as wall-ball and staring contests, which Courage invariably loses.

=== Cajun Fox ===
Cajun Fox (voiced by Paul Schoeffler) is an orange sunglass-wearing fox obsessed with cooking who appears in "Cajun Granny Stew" and "Ball of Revenge". He kidnaps Muriel to make a stew, using her as the final ingredient, but he ends up falling into the pot of stew himself when Courage falls on top of him and Muriel just as he is about to throw Muriel into the pot.

=== The Shadow ===
The Shadow (voiced by Dennis Predovic) is a living shadow who can change his shape and appearance. In the episode "The Shadow of Courage", he terrorizes the people of Nowhere by frightening them, but is forced to retreat to the Bagge estate during a lightning storm, where he scares Courage and Eustace. Eventually, Courage decides to confront Shadow, who reveals that he wants to be a movie star. Courage then takes the Shadow to see the night sky, where he transforms into an actual star.

=== Le Quack ===
Le Quack (voiced by Paul Schoeffler) is a French-accented duck con-artist who first appears early in the show's first season, in which he has a fake amnesia-specialist license; he comes to the Bagges' house when Muriel has amnesia. Since then, he frequently returns and manages to dupe Courage's owners into helping him commit crime sprees. Le Quack is also shown to be capable of escaping custody such as when he was first arrested, crashing the police car in the process, and later causing a fire at prison.

=== Di Lung ===
Di Lung (voiced by Tim Chi Ly) is a Chinese inventor who first appears in the episode "Hothead". He is very inconsiderate and rude, and usually gets caught in the middle of the chaos happening in Nowhere, prompting him to shout his catchphrase of "Watch where you're going, ya fool!". He is the inventor of Mecha-Courage. Di Lung also has two aunts: one good and one bad, who are both the Empresses of China; thus, this could make him royalty.

=== Freaky Fred ===
Freaky Fred (voiced by Paul Schoeffler) is Muriel's nephew who was sent to the "Home for Freaky Barbers" due to his obsession with cutting the hair of people or animals to the point that they are bald. He speaks in poems and rhymes often repeating the word "naughty" when describing certain situations.

=== The Weremole ===
The Weremole is a mole similar to a werewolf but much smaller, yet just as fierce. It has a taste for rabbits and people, and if a person is bitten by the Weremole, they become one themselves. The only way to reverse the transformation is to feed one of the Weremole's hairs to the victim. In the episode "Night of the Weremole", Muriel is bitten by a Weremole, causing her to transform into a Weremole under a full moon. Courage drops one of the original Weremole's hairs in Muriel's mouth, returning her to normal.

=== Ma Bagge ===
Ma Bagge (voiced by Billie Lou Watt) is the mother of Eustace and Horst and Muriel's mother-in-law, who shares a love-hate relationship with the former, usually calling him "Stupid Boy". She lives in a trailer and is the widow of Icket Bagge (Eustace's father). Like Eustace, she is actually bald but wears a wig and looks almost identical to her son, but much shorter, along with being insecure due to being bald, but she does have her teeth. It is learned that Ma and Horst's ill treatment was part of Eustace's negative personality. She tends to treat Courage kindly whenever Eustace is around, possibly because she knows it annoys him, though she also has a love-hate relationship with Courage and calls him a "stupid dog" just like Eustace does. She's also the owner of Growth Industries, a company that produces wigs and experiments on certain people with a rare blood type, one that Muriel has.

=== King Ramses ===
King Ramses (voiced by John R. Dilworth) is the ghost of a pharaoh from ancient Egypt. Two cat grave robbers steal a slab (decorated with images of King Ramses and pictures corresponding to each of his three curses) from his tomb and flee to Nowhere, but Ramses appears and demands the return of his slab. They refuse, so Ramses summons a swarm of locusts. He later attacks the farm when Courage finds the slab and Eustace refuses to return it after discovering it is worth a fortune. Ramses unleashes one final curse that imprisons Eustace in the slab as punishment.

=== The Clutching Foot ===
The Clutching Foot (voiced by Paul Schoeffler [big toe] and Arnold Stang [little toe]) is a foot fungus that Eustace contracts before mutating into a sentient being. It resembles a giant purple left foot with heads for toes and acts as if it were a stereotypical criminal mob, with the big toe as the kingpin and the smaller toes as his goons. It orders Courage to carry out crimes during the episode. It is later defeated when Courage licks it after researching and finding that its main weakness is dog saliva.

=== The Goose God ===
The Goose God (voiced by Paul Schoeffler) is a goose who came down from the heavens to search for the woman of his dreams, and ended up falling in love with Muriel, whom he competed with Courage and Eustace to make his wife and queen (even though Eustace is completely unaware this is happening). He later falls for Eustace's truck after hearing it honk.

=== The Queen of the Black Puddle ===
The Queen of the Black Puddle (voiced by Ruth Williamson) is an otherworldly siren temptress who resides within a supernatural black puddle. Her sinister goals are to seduce men gradually until she eventually manages to guide them to her puddle, where she eats them. She appeared in the episode of the same name, where she successfully manages to charm Eustace and almost succeeds in devouring him, but Courage triumphs over her and escapes back to the surface with Eustace.

=== Benton Tarantella and Errol Von Volkheim ===
Benton Tarantella and Errol Von Volkheim (respectively voiced by Peter Fernandez and Paul Schoeffler) are a zombified duo of film directors. In "Everyone Wants to Direct", they would pose as ordinary movie producers to lure unsuspecting victims to their fates, killing them in the process as part of their "film". Tarantella is named after Quentin Tarantino, while Volkheim is named after Erich von Stroheim and Errol Flynn.

=== The Snowman ===
The Snowman (voiced by Paul Schoeffler, impersonating Sean Connery) is a talking snowman scientist believed to be the last of his kind due to global warming. In his first appearance, he tries to steal Eustace and Muriel's "anti-melting" gene. He returns in the episode "The Snowman's Revenge" where he turns the farmhouse into the West Pole and freezes Courage and his owners, however, he reveals how he lost his home and friends. After Courage restores his homeland and his friends, he returns home to reunite with them. The character is an homage to many conventions associated with the James Bond film series.

=== The Evil Eggplants ===
The Evil Eggplants (voiced by Jason Antoon and Don Peoples) are a group of sapient eggplants that live under the Bagges' farm and are led by their leader Bobby Ganoush and his lieutenant Ratatouille. They spy on the farm through a periscope placed in an eggplant Muriel grows. They decide to attack the farm because they are not getting enough water and because Muriel harvests the eggplant with the periscope, angering them because they believe it is unjust to eat eggplants. The eggplants take Muriel captive for her treatment of the eggplant, but Courage eventually saves her and floods the chasing army of eggplants, causing them to take root and leave the farm alone. Bobby's name is a play on the eggplant-based Middle Eastern dish baba ghanoush.

=== The Great Fusilli ===
The Great Fusilli (voiced by Jim Cummings) is an Italian alligator devoted to theater arts who turns people into puppets so that they cannot leave his show. He is defeated when he mistakes Courage for a phantom and falls off the balcony and becomes a marionette himself, but not before changing Eustace and Muriel.

=== Robot Randy ===
Robot Randy (voiced by Todd Stashwick) is an outcast from a distant planet populated by gigantic violent robots. He is sent to conquer Earth to redeem his honor. Once on the planet, he enslaves Eustace, Muriel, and Courage, forcing them to build statues of him. However, he is internally conflicted, as he does not wish to hurt others, but instead to whittle reindeer. Courage challenges Randy in a competition to save the Bagges. When Courage wins, Randy releases them and returns to his planet, where he is accepted for his carving skills.

=== Buschwick ===
Buschwick (voiced by André Sogliuzzo) is a human-sized cockroach who comes from a New York City neighborhood of the same name. He appears in the episode "Courage in the Big Stinkin' City" and invites the Bagges backstage at Radio City Music Hall close to Rockefeller Center in Midtown Manhattan in New York City, New York, luring Muriel with the promise of rehearsing for a sitar concert which was a prize that she won in a contest and deceiving Eustace into thinking that he will get hot dogs. Buschwick sends Courage to retrieve a package, threatening to sentence Muriel to be a victim of an unseen monster behind a locked door if he does not receive the package before curtain time. Although Courage recovers the package, Schwick finds that its contents are damaged, infuriating him to the point of releasing his pet from its cage. The creature eats Eustace, but Courage and Muriel attend the concert while Schwick is arrested.

=== Buschwick's pet ===
Buschwick's pet is a creature that is trapped behind a mousehole door in his rehearsal room. The unseen animal killed previous visitors who entered the room. Though the creature was not identified in the series itself, creator John R. Dilworth confirmed it to be a hamster.

=== Violin Girl ===
The Violin Girl is a third occupant residing inside Schwick's apartment where the package he orders Courage to retrieve is also situated. While not directly terrorising the protagonists, the girl initially has her back to Courage, but then turns and intimidates him with a scary face.

=== King Kong ===
King Kong (voiced by Paul Schoeffler) is a large ape who appears in the episode "1,000 Years of Courage". When Courage and his owners are sent to a future Earth inhabited by talking banana people, the Big Ape poses as the Banana God to devour the banana people, while his nephew disguises himself as a benevolent sovereign. After the episode, both monkeys are musicians for the banana people.

=== Mayan Baker ===
The Mayan Baker (voiced by Daniel Oreskes) is the reanimated corpse of a Mayan royal baker. In ancient times, the baker served cookies to the Mayan princess until she falsely accused him of stealing cookies and selling them to villagers for money, but the thief was really her trusted royal poobah. Thousands of years later, Professor Frith accidentally resurrects the Mummy. After attacking him, the Mummy decides to take revenge against Eustace and Muriel, mistaking them for the princess and poobah. With some setbacks, the Mummy finally arrives at the farm, where Courage hypnotizes Eustace and Muriel into thinking they are the princess and the poobah. After recreating the situation from thousands of years earlier, Courage surmises that the Baker was framed by the Poobah. Satisfied, the Mummy returns to his tomb.

=== Doctor Gerbil ===
Doctor Gerbil (voiced by Guy Paul) is a gerbil who went mad due to being experimented on and being trapped by his previous owners. He is now a mad scientist who performs strange experiments on humans with homemade cosmetic products, intending to exact revenge on humans for what they do to animals.

=== Mustafa al Bacterius ===
Mustafa al Bacterius (voiced by Arnold Stang) is a parasitic alien who appears in "Mission to the Sun". When Courage and the Bagges are sent on a mission to prevent the Sun from burning out, Bacterius attempts to sabotage their mission by firstly infecting and controlling Muriel's mind, and then using her to destroy their spaceship. Eventually, he is sucked out of the ship through the toilet and infects Eustace.

=== Captain Sharky ===
Captain Sharky (voiced by Ron McLarty) is the main antagonist from the episode "Serpent of Evil River". He is an obsessive pirate who is bent on finding and capture the monster Carmen. The Captain has a tattoo of a shark on his chest, an anchor tattoo on his right arm, an hook replacing his right arm, a peg leg on his right leg, and an eyepatch covering his left eye.

=== Jeeves Weevil ===
Jeeves Weevil (voiced by Michael Allinson) is a human-sized, polite, blood-sucking weevil who wears a tuxedo and hat. When the Bagges accidentally run him over with their truck and injure him, he is accepted into their home. While a seeming gentleman, he begins to suck the life out of Muriel and Eustace. He does not suck out dogs' lives, so Courage is unharmed. He succeeds at sucking out Eustace's life.

=== McPhearson Phantom ===
The McPhearson Phantom (voiced by Billie Lou Watt) is the vengeful ghost of a Scottish woman who seeks revenge for the death of her husband when he got thrown to the Loch Ness Monster by a cruel woman long ago. Believing Muriel to be related to the perpetrator, she and Ma Bagge work together to break up her and Eustace's marriage. However thanks to Courage rekindling their relationship, the phantom finds out that it was actually Ma's great-great-aunt who threw her husband, turning her sights on her.

=== The Spirit of the Harvest Moon ===
The Spirit of the Harvest Moon (voiced by Peter Fernandez) is a haunting spirit who is the antagonist of the episode "The House of Discontent"; its appearance resembles a disembodied pale head with dark eyes. When Eustace fails to give an offering during a harvest moon, the spirit threatens the Bagges to leave their home for not respecting their property. The spirit then offers them a chance to grow something until midnight, but when time runs out, it traps Eustace and Muriel in the basement while raising the temperature. Courage uses Eustace's sweat to water a flower, pleasing the spirit and letting them live.

=== Doctor Zalost ===
Dr. Zalost (voiced by Paul Schoeffler) is "the greatest unhappy scientist who ever lived" who lives in a giant and mobile tower. He lives with his assistant, Rat, whom he constantly asks for a hug. He demands 33⅓ billion dollars from the city of Nowhere to fund his "Unhappy Cannonball" project, only to be brushed off by the city's officials as a scam artist. In retaliation, Zalost attacks the city by firing unhappy cannonballs from his mobile tower, making the citizens of the city depressed and unproductive. Despite receiving his money in the end, he refuses to return the inhabitants of the city to normal, as he is jealous of the happiness of others. He then turns his attention towards the Bagge family, determined to inflict sadness and depression on all of the inhabitants of Nowhere. His name is a word of Croatian, Serbian, Bosnian, or Slovenian origin meaning "sorrow" or "sadness".

=== Mecha-Courage ===
Mecha-Courage (voiced by John R. Dilworth) is a robotic version of Courage that was created by Di Lung in an attempt to prove that he has created a dog that is superior to Courage in every way. Mecha-Courage resembles a mini-dome, colored pink with a purple underside and tail, on wheels, with a red, blinking light for a nose.

=== Hard Drive Virus ===
The Hard Drive Virus (voiced by Arnold Stang) is a worm-like computer virus who appears in the episode "Hard Drive Courage". It festers inside Courage's computer and kidnaps Muriel so he can use her to get rid of his cold. Courage helps the virus by feeding him Muriel's special gelatin, curing him of his illness.

=== Conway the Contaminationist ===
Conway the Contaminationist (voiced by Peter Fernandez) is an elderly man claiming to be 193 years old, who also claims that a filthy environment is "better" and "healthier" than a clean one. He only appears in the episode of the same name, in which he pollutes the Bagge farmhouse and convinces Muriel and Eustace to be filthy as well.

=== Professor (Floyd) ===
Professor (Floyd) (voiced by Jason Antoon) is an old man who often makes in the show. He is normally a good guy, but he has been a villain in some episodes, such as "Curtain of Cruelty"; however, he redeemed himself in that episode.

=== Mona Lisa ===
Mona Lisa (voiced by Loretta Palma) is a woman painted by Leonardo da Vinci and is a work of art long adored by Muriel. After the Bagges are inadvertently locked inside the Louvre, an eerie alignment of the planets occurs and the exhibits come to life, including Mona Lisa and The Thinker. Mona Lisa attempts to get the Thinker to kiss her, but he only thinks about it, true to his title. She ends up with The Kiss statue of Paolo after Courage hits him with Cupid's arrow and holds up her picture. Mona Lisa willingly returns to her painting with Paolo and lets Muriel go.

=== The Thinker ===
The Thinker (voiced by Rod P. Houston) is the masterpiece of Auguste Rodin who goes on a date with Mona Lisa during the episode. He is constantly saying "Let me think" every time Mona Lisa suggests something that they should do. His thinking got in the way though, and he ended up alone in a painting after the planets were no longer aligned.

=== The Fishionary ===
The Fishionary (voiced by Gerrianne Raphael) is a purple female fish who serves as a missionary for the Fish Judges and their octopus coworker. She comes to the farm and takes the Bagges and Courage to the Judges' domain in a bus, falsely accusing them of committing crimes against sea creatures; however, it was all a ruse for her own scheme to take over the Bagges' home. Her deception is discovered thanks to Courage's actions. Outraged by the Fishionary's betrayal, the Fish Judges has the Bagges released while the Fishionary is punished in their place.

=== Mr. Nasty ===
Mr. Nasty (voiced by Arthur Anderson) is a character created by Benton Tarantella from Eustace's evil essence. He is similar to Eustace (both in identity and personality), only with sunglasses in place of his eyeglasses, blue skin, and a deeper voice. After Nasty is brought into existence, he co-stars in Tarantella's reality TV show Angry Nasty People alongside Eustace, in which they both mistreat Courage and Muriel.

=== Eliza and Elisa Stitch ===
Eliza and Elisa Stitch (voiced by Fran Brill) are a pair of conjoined twin sisters who attempt to be immortal by sewing other women's souls into a quilt. They did this by making them put a symbol on a piece of fabric, turning the person into quilt material, then they say a chant "Be believe belong be believe belong leave the circle never weave this quilt forever."

=== King of Flan ===
The King of Flan (voiced by Jorge Pupo) is an overweight man with a Spanish accent and the proprietor of a company that makes flan. He produces a TV commercial that uses hypnotism to attract customers, all of whom become morbidly obese after eating too much flan. Courage comes to stop the King of Flan from broadcasting on all the networks and causes the King to accidentally hypnotize himself.

=== Chief Wicky Wicky ===
Chief Wicky Wicky (voiced by Babi Floyd) is the overweight leader of an island tribe, who live on Hip Hip Island, looking for someone to sacrifice to their volcano god. He lives on the island with his daughter Wicky Wicky Woo. He attempts to throw Muriel into the volcano to save his village.

=== The Windmill Vandals ===
The Windmill Vandals are a group of four horsebacked Vandals who once plagued the land of Nowhere. The farmer who once lived in the farmhouse where the Bagge family now resides constructed the windmill next to the farmhouse and inscribed several runes, one on each blade of the windmill, to keep the Vandals away. After the windmill breaks, the Vandals appear as wraiths to come and destroy the farmhouse. The mill is repaired and broken several times until it is fully fixed, banishing the Vandals.

=== Silhouette Maker ===
The Silhouette Maker (voiced by Paul Schoeffler) is an old man who made paper versions of Eustace and Muriel at a stall at his fair.

=== Mad Dog ===
Mad Dog (voiced by Peter Fernandez) is a Doberman and the fierce leader of an evil dog-gang who began dating Bunny until Courage came to her rescue. He is shown to be possessive and abusive towards Bunny to the point of forcing her to not see her best friend Kitty, as he will bury both of them if they are seen together.

=== The Empress ===
Empress Ai Shen (voiced by Winnie Chaffee) is the aunt of Di Lung and the evil Empress of China, and she appeared in "Squatting Tiger, Hidden Dog", where her source of power (a magic silkworm) is dying and needs the bones of someone truly innocent to recharge it. She tries to steal Muriel's bones, but is stopped by Courage and her twin sister Mei Ling, the true empress.

=== The Space Whale ===
The Space Whale is a giant whale from space who is capable of devouring planets, asteroids, ships, and comets. After it attempts to eat a pair of Star-Makers, the male squid sacrifices himself to save the female by exploding into stars that destroys them both. Like the Star-Makers, the Space Whale is the last of its kind.

=== Big Bayou ===
Big Bayou (voiced by Michael C. Gwynne) is a red bayou snake who appears in the episode "The Uncommon Cold". In the episode, he magically enslaved a colony of slugs and forced them to create statues made from his own skin to personally admire himself. To get back their freedom, the slugs used one of his spells to send a message to the Bagges by giving Muriel a cold in order to help them. In order to both cure Muriel and free the slugs, Courage must steal Big Bayou's magic book from his lair; during a pursuing chase, Courage uses his magic book to animate his own statues and turn them against Big Bayou.

=== The Cruel Veterinarian ===
The Cruel Veterinarian (voiced by George Hall) is a veterinarian who separated Courage from his parents as a puppy under the guise of a veterinary consultation. Manipulating Courage's parents into talking with him privately, he traps them and locks them in a rocket ship before launching them into space. In the present day, Courage is taken to the same veterinarian by Muriel and Eustace. Recognizing the vet, Courage uncovers his sinister plan to repeat the experiment with Courage as the subject. Courage thwarts the veterinarian and sends him to a distant planet in his own rocket. The veterinarian is attacked by the dogs from his previous experiments, including Courage's parents, who are revealed have survived.

== Minor characters ==
=== Nowhere Newsman ===
The Nowhere Newsman (voiced by Paul Schoeffler) is a local TV news reporter. The Nowhere Newsman introduces every episode stating, "We interrupt this program to bring you the Courage the Cowardly Dog show." He is also seen in some episodes when the television is on, conveying news about the antagonist.

=== Charlie the Mouse ===
Charlie (voiced primarily by Tom McKeon; Tom Cummings in "Cowboy Courage", Dennis Predovic in "Stormy Weather", John R. Dilworth in "The Mask") is a delivery mouse and a personal friend of Courage's, usually helping Courage out in certain situations. He is referred to as Mr. Mouse, with his first name revealed as Charlie in the episode "The Mask". His interaction with Courage often ends with Courage exclaiming, "Thanks, Mr. Mouse!", to which he replies, "No prob."

=== Bigfoot ===
Bigfoot (voiced by John R. Dilworth) appears only in the episode "Courage Meets Bigfoot". Although portrayed as a scary monster, in the same episode, he is actually friendly and slightly sensitive. At the end of the episode, it is revealed that his name is Theodore and he got lost after playing far away from home.

=== Floyd ===
Floyd (voiced by John R. Dilworth) is a balding elderly man, who deals with various paranormal activities, often making cameo appearances on the show. He's usually a good person, but he's been a villain in some episodes.

=== The Duck Brothers ===
The Duck Brothers (voiced by Will Ryan in "The Duck Brothers", David Steven Cohen in "Ball of Revenge") are three space ducks who are brothers. Their names are Donnie, Clyde, and Payne. They appear in two episodes, the first in which two of them abduct Muriel and place a mind-control device on her for their own purposes. Courage tries to rescue Muriel, only to find that the duck brothers were planning a rescue mission of their own to save the other duck brother, who has been captured by the United States government. Courage volunteers to be mind-controlled instead, and they save the third brother. The three duck brothers reunite and leave. Two of the brothers make a cameo appearance in "Ball of Revenge", where they play guitars and perform as the half-time show.

=== Horst Bagge ===
Horst Bagge (voiced by Peter Fernandez) is Eustace's deceased older brother and Muriel's brother-in-law, who was a hunter. He was the former owner of the farmhouse as seen in a flashback in the episode "Farmer-Hunter, Farmer-Hunted". Eustace is now the current owner, presumably inheriting the farmhouse after Horst's death.

=== Jean Bon ===
Jean Bon (voiced by Dennis Predovic) is a jovial pig butcher who runs a restaurant in Nowhere with his wife Mrs. Bon. He first appeared in the episode "Heads of Beef", where Eustace and Courage visit his establishment for some burgers when Muriel is sick. Courage suspects that Bon may be turning people into meat. It is later revealed to be a misunderstanding as his wife is an artist sculpting meat to resemble customers.

=== The Magic Tree ===
The Magic Tree (voiced by Peter Fernandez) is a magical tree that Courage grows, capable of granting wishes. After Eustace's wish causes Muriel's head to swell up, Eustace considers the tree a threat and decides to chop it down. After the tree has been cut down and before it dies, it tells Courage how to cure Muriel. In retaliation, the tree causes Eustace's head to be swollen like Muriel had been.

=== Basil ===
Basil (voiced by George Taylor) is a male burglar with dementia who appears in the episode "Family Business", who mistakes the Bagges as his own family; his cousin Nigel (Courage), Mama Mashedpotatoes (Muriel), and Uncle Twinkletoes (Eustace). He later sends the Bagges a letter explaining he has since given up a life of crime and has become an underwater electric eel massage therapist.

=== Space Dino ===
The Space Dino is a dinosaur-like alien that stands on an asteroid outside Earth's atmosphere, and is always seen with a tennis racket, which he uses to hit celestial objects. In the episode "1,000 Years of Courage", the Space Dino hits a meteor, which strikes Earth and causes time to progress 1,000 years into the future.

=== Carmen the Serpent ===
Carmen the Serpent (voiced by Vima Bauer) is a monstrous, one-eyed sea serpent who lives in the Evil River, and is "evil" according to a sea captain. The sea captain fools the Bagges under the false promise of a luxury cruise, only to reveal that he actually shanghaied them to sail through the Evil River to find and hunt down Carmen. The sea serpent kidnaps Muriel and takes her to her cave and starts singing opera to her. Courage comes to Muriel's rescue, only to realize that Carmen was not trying to harm Muriel. Courage helps Carmen to dodge and defeat the evil captain.

=== Kangaroo Monsters ===
Kangaroo Monsters are giant kangaroos who like to squish whatever is smaller than them. Because they are so powerful, only another Kangaroo Monster can defeat one. Following a bone implant using a Kangaroo Monster's bone, Eustace mutates into one, which forces Courage to do the same in order to defeat him.

=== Icket Bagge ===
Icket Bagge is Eustace's and Horst's deceased father, Ma Bagge's husband, and Muriel's father-in-law. He is mentioned in the episodes "The Sandwhale Strikes" and "Mother's Day". His appearance is very close to Eustace's, except he has a beard. It is unknown how his relationship with Eustace was, whether he treated Eustace poorly like Horst and Ma or he treated Eustace with respect.

=== Twin Raccoons ===
The Twin Raccoons are two raccoon brothers who are revealed as bandits. Hugo is voiced by B. J. Ward and Herman is voiced by John R. Dilworth. They attack Courage and kidnap Muriel because they want her as a parent. Muriel feels pity on them and accepts them like her own adopted children. At the end of the episode, Muriel's place has been taken over by Eustace as a new parent.

=== The Storm Goddess ===
The Storm Goddess (voiced by Ashley Albert) is a female deity with a rain cloud over her head who appears in the episode "Stormy Weather". She mistakes Courage for her lost dog Duncan and tries to take him, but Muriel rejects giving custody to her. At that point, Muriel and the goddess angrily argue with each other, which causes the goddess to create a powerful storm that nearly destroys the Bagge farm until Courage finds her dog.

=== The Sandman ===
The Sandman (voiced by David Saire) is the king of sleep who resides in a tall castle made of sand in the middle of a forest, counting sheep indefinitely in a futile attempt to go to sleep. After stealing Muriel's "sleep" to cure his insomnia, which renders Muriel sleepless, Courage tracks Sandman down to retrieve it. After a prolonged chase, Courage finds the Sandman's lost teddy bear under his mattress. With his beloved stuffed animal back, Sandman willingly returns Muriel's sleep.

=== Tulip ===
Tulip (voiced by B. J. Ward) is a blue-skinned alien girl from the planet Eck. Tulip has a pet worm and two humanoid teddy bears (voiced by John Adams and Jason Antoon).

=== Kitty and Bunny ===
Kitty and Bunny (voiced by Barbara McCulloh and Lori Ann Mahl respectively) are a female cat and a rabbit who are girlfriends. They appeared in the episode "The Mask" where Bunny is held captive by her abusive boyfriend Mad Dog and Kitty tries to save her, unintentionally getting help from Courage even though he is kept in the dark about the situation and is terrified of Kitty.

=== The Star-Maker ===
The Star-Maker is a squid-like alien who landed on Earth with her unhatched offspring. She and her mate are the last of their kind. After her mate died saving them from a space whale, she escapes to Earth to hatch the eggs. After being found near the Bagge's farmhouse, Eustace calls the US government, which contains the squid in a mobile laboratory. Courage manages to hatch her offspring, who return to space to make new stars. Afterwards, the Star-Maker dies peacefully and her body becomes a garden.

=== The Librarian ===
The Librarian (voiced by Gerrianne Raphael) is a librarian who punishes anyone who does not return their borrowed library books on time.

=== Noble and Hope ===
Noble and Hope (voiced by Gerrianne Raphael and Paul Hecht) are Courage's parents. They were launched into space by the Cruel Veterinarian. Courage avoided a similar fate by escaping through a garbage chute, where he was found by Muriel. The Cruel Veterinarian was trapped (by Courage, during the vet's failed attempts to send him, Muriel and Eustace into space) in the rocket, and was launched in space, crash-landing on the planet where Courage's parents and other dogs resided.

In the prequel pilot Before Courage, their names were revealed to be Noble and Hope.

=== Clyde the Fog Spirit ===
Clyde the Fog Spirit (voiced by John R. Dilworth) appears in the animated special "The Fog of Courage", who comes to the farm to get the amulet that belongs to the Fog Ghost's long-lost love, Cariana.
