= Marty Grabstein =

American actor

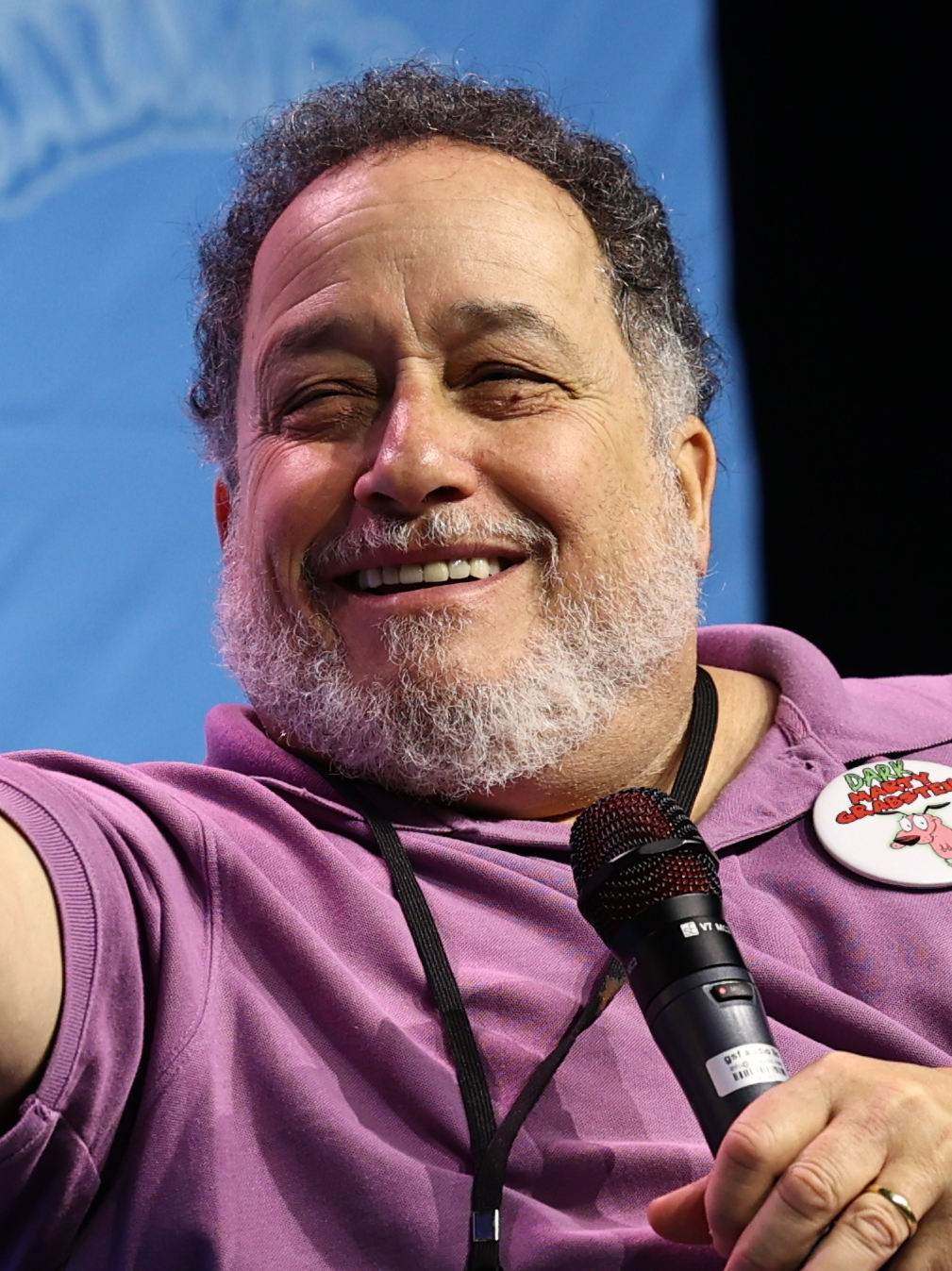
- Grabstein at GalaxyCon Columbus in 2023
- Born: Brooklyn, New York, U.S.
- Occupation: Actor
- Years active: 1976–present
- Spouse: Nancy Hughes (m. 1999)
- Children: 2

Marty Grabstein is an American actor, best known for voicing the titular character in the Cartoon Network animated series Courage the Cowardly Dog.

== Career ==
Grabstein's career has included work in films, television series, live sketch comedy, theater and commercials. Grabstein’s film credits include Bury The Evidence and Apartment #5C. His television credits include parts on three Law & Order series, Third Watch, and Conviction.

In addition to roles in several theater productions, Grabstein co-wrote and co-starred with Rick Mowat for their sketch comedy act Lab Rats, which they performed in comedy clubs throughout New York City. During the years they performed in that show they regularly arrived with new material.

Grabstein is well-known for doing the voice of the titular character in the Cartoon Network animated series Courage the Cowardly Dog. Grabstein used a combination of paranoia and panic to make the voice of Courage authentic. In the first season, Courage had spoken dialogue, but this was largely reduced to gibberish and mumbling afterward because the show's producers felt that he "talked too much" and wanted him to be more laconic.

Grabstein reprised his role as Courage for the TV special The Fog of Courage and the crossover film Straight Outta Nowhere: Scooby-Doo! Meets Courage the Cowardly Dog.

== Personal life ==
Grabstein's father Danny was the owner of Grabstein's Deli in Canarsie, Brooklyn and his mother, Edna (née Bine) was a talented singer who once sang Cabaret at Don't Tell Mama's in New York City. Grabstein currently lives in New Jersey with his wife Nancy, who is a nurse, and sons Matthew and Daniel. In 2024, Grabstein had a mild stroke which affected his speech.

== Filmography ==
=== Film ===
Year	Title	Role	Notes
1998	Bury the Evidence	Nervous Man	
2002	Apartment #5C	Restaurant Owner	
2015	A Cat's Tale	Rob	
2021	Straight Outta Nowhere: Scooby-Doo! Meets Courage the Cowardly Dog	Courage, Mr. McGill / Clown	Voice, direct-to-video

=== Television ===
Year	Title	Role	Notes
1997–2003	Law & Order	Ackerman, Bob, Shlomo Fineberg	3 episodes
1999–2002	Courage the Cowardly Dog	Courage	Voice, main role (52 episodes)
2002	Law & Order: Criminal Intent	Pomerantz	Episode: "The Insider"
2003	Manhattan's Best Friend	Additional voices	Short
2003	Law & Order: Special Victims Unit	Ronny Ickles	Episode: "Shaken"
2004	Third Watch	Ted	Episode: "Last Will and Testament"
2005	Wonder Showzen	Singing Chest	Episode: "Ocean"
2006	Conviction	Saul Mincheff	Episode: "Indiscretion"
2009	Hanging Plant	Plant Guy	Short
2012	Cartoon Network 20th Anniversary	Courage	Voice, television film
2014	The Fog of Courage	Courage	Voice, short

=== Video games ===
Year	Title	Role	Notes
2006	Cartoon Network Racing	Courage	
2009	FusionFall	Courage	
