= Jeff Bergman =

American voice actor (born 1960)

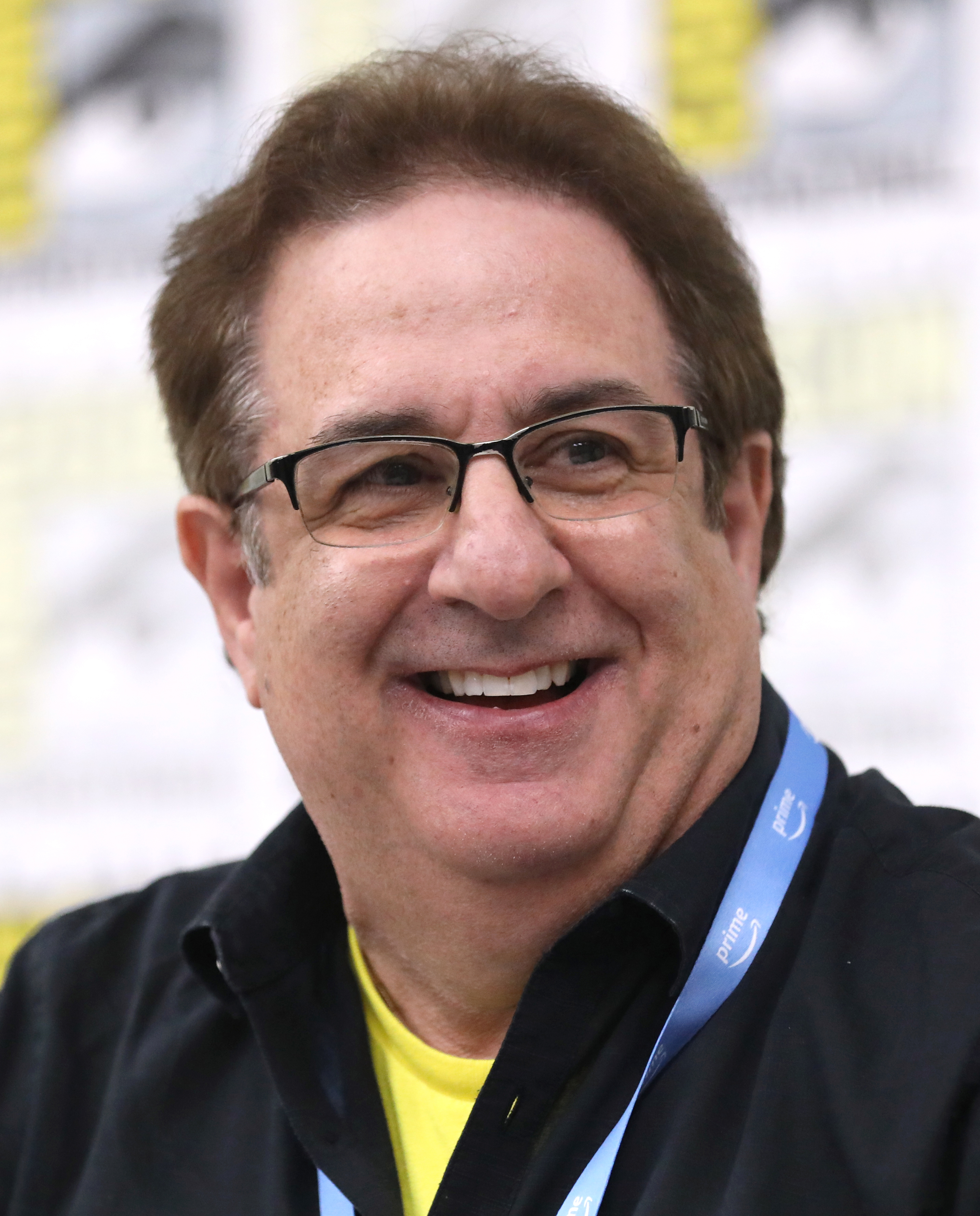
- Bergman at the 2023 San Diego Comic-Con
- Born: Jeffrey Allen Bergman; July 10, 1960 (age 66); Philadelphia, Pennsylvania, U.S.
- Education: University of Pittsburgh
- Occupations: Voice actor; impressionist
- Years active: 1980–present
- Spouse: Carla Delaney
- Children: 2

Jeffrey Allen Bergman (born July 10, 1960) is an American voice actor and impressionist who has had provided the modern-day voices of various classic cartoon characters, most notably with Looney Tunes, Hanna-Barbera and later Disney and Pixar.

Bergman was the first to replace Mel Blanc as the voice of Bugs Bunny, Daffy Duck and several other Warner Bros. cartoon characters following Blanc's death in 1989. Bergman shared the roles of Blanc's characters with Greg Burson, Joe Alaskey, and Eric Bauza before their respective deaths in 2008, 2016, and 2026, as well as Bob Bergen, Billy West, Jim Cummings, Maurice LaMarche, and Fred Tatasciore for various Warner Bros. Animation productions. Bergman later became the current voice of Mr. Potato Head in the Toy Story franchise since 2026, replacing his longtime voice actor Don Rickles, who died in 2017.

== Early life ==
Bergman was born as Jeffrey Allen Bergman on July 10, 1960 to a Jewish family in Philadelphia, Pennsylvania. Throughout his early life, he impersonated several celebrities and cartoon characters, his first impression being comic influence Ed Sullivan at the age of 6. He credits Don Rickles as an influence. At the age of 15, Bergman began doing impressions of various Looney Tunes characters.

He studied theatre and communications at the University of Pittsburgh where he first did voice work after becoming involved with a student-run radio station and interning at the KQV and WDVE radio stations. While there, he made his first demo reel and was profiled in a story on KDKA-TV's Evening Magazine. The story was picked up on similar TV news magazines shows and helped land him his representation with William Morris Agency following his graduation from Pitt in 1983.

During his time at university, Bergman attended an on-campus lecture by Mel Blanc, who was best known for voicing the Looney Tunes characters such as Bugs Bunny. Bergman later tracked Blanc down and met him at his Oakland hotel room in 1981, where Bergman imitated Blanc's characters for him, earning himself a 45-minute session. Bergman credits Blanc with helping him graduate two years later.

== Career ==
In 1986, Bergman auditioned to voice the Pillsbury Doughboy, but he eventually got the part of StarKist's mascot Charlie the Tuna instead. Bergman's work with Warner Bros. began that year, recording voices for The Bugs Bunny Show. After being rebuffed several times by Warner Bros. directors, he recorded a tape of himself as several of Blanc's characters, including Bugs Bunny. He took the tape to the production company and used a switch to toggle back and forth between his work and the original Mel Blanc recording. Then-Warner Bros. president Edward Bleier was unable to tell the difference between the voices, and Bergman, at the age of 29, became the first performer to provide the voice of Bugs Bunny after Mel Blanc died on July 10, 1989, Bergman's 29th birthday.

Bergman's first performance as Bugs Bunny was during the 62nd Academy Awards as Bugs presented the Oscar for Best Live Action Short Film. He voiced Bugs, as well as Daffy Duck, during the 1990 television specials Cartoon All-Stars to the Rescue and The Earth Day Special (also voicing Tweety Bird and Porky Pig in the latter). That same year, he also lent his voice to Bugs, Daffy and Porky in the animated sequences of Gremlins 2: The New Batch (1990). Bergman later voiced Bugs and Daffy again as well as Elmer Fudd in the 1991 theatrical short Box-Office Bunny, Bugs's first in over 25 years. He voiced Bugs, Daffy, Elmer and Yosemite Sam in the 1991 short (Blooper) Bunny, as well as several characters (including Sylvester the Cat and Foghorn Leghorn) in animated television specials and newer animated series such as Tiny Toon Adventures and The Plucky Duck Show.

Outside of the Looney Tunes, Bergman also voiced George Jetson and Mr. Spacely in Jetsons: The Movie (1990) when their previous voice actors George O'Hanlon and Mel Blanc both died during production; he had been working at his local radio station in Pennsylvania when he received the call to travel to California and complete the dialogue. He also voiced George Jetson in the theme park attraction The Funtastic World of Hanna-Barbera. By the mid-1990s, Bergman decided to not continue voicing the Looney Tunes characters, due to reluctance about relocating to Los Angeles. At the time, he was living in Pittsburgh, and Warner Bros. hired other voice actors such as Joe Alaskey (who was the first person to replace Blanc as the voice of Yosemite Sam in Who Framed Roger Rabbit in 1988), Greg Burson, Bob Bergen, Billy West and Blanc's son Noel Blanc. Warner Bros. had been splitting up the various voice-acting roles to prevent any one of them from being a singular successor.

Throughout the 1990s and 2000s, Bergman continued voicing various Hanna-Barbera characters, such as Fred Flintstone, in newer specials such as The Flintstones: On the Rocks following Henry Corden's retirement from the role in 2000, only understudying the voices of the Looney Tunes in times when Alaskey and West were not available. In 2003, he provided Bugs' voice for a sketch on the NBC variety series Saturday Night Live, though his audio track ended up not being used due to the show's busy weekly schedule. Eventually, after almost 20 years, and after occasionally appearing as the Looney Tunes characters for nearly two decades, he returned as the voice of Bugs Bunny, Daffy Duck, Foghorn Leghorn, Sylvester the Cat, Pepé Le Pew and Tweety in 2011's The Looney Tunes Show. He also returned for the 2015 series New Looney Tunes, voicing Bugs, Foghorn, Sylvester and Elmer Fudd, as well as other minor characters such as Michigan J. Frog. He also voiced some characters in Looney Tunes Cartoons; Eric Bauza voiced Bugs, Daffy, and Tweety in the series, with Bergman voicing Foghorn, Sylvester and Elmer Fudd.

Bergman is a recurring cast member on Family Guy, usually voicing Fred Flintstone and Sylvester the Cat and on its spin-offs American Dad! and The Cleveland Show.

Bergman had a recurring role as radio intern Gus Kahana on the AMC comedy-drama Remember WENN, which aired in the late 1990s. He also provided the voice of Zap in the Skylanders series.

In 2021, Bergman became the new voice of Eustace Bagge in the Courage the Cowardly Dog/Scooby-Doo crossover, Straight Outta Nowhere, replacing the previous voice actors, Lionel Wilson and Arthur Anderson, both of which died years after Courage ended. In 2026, Bergman voiced Mr. Potato Head in Toy Story 5 (2026), replacing his longtime voice actor Don Rickles, who died on April 6, 2017.

== Characters ==
Bergman has voiced a large quantity of characters over his career. His vocal repertoire includes Bugs Bunny, Daffy Duck, Sylvester the Cat, Tweety, Foghorn Leghorn, Elmer Fudd, Porky Pig, Marvin the Martian, Pepé Le Pew, Tasmanian Devil, Yosemite Sam, Speedy Gonzales, Yogi Bear, Huckleberry Hound, Quick Draw McGraw, Snagglepuss, Boo-Boo Bear, Ranger Smith, Wally Gator, Pixie and Dixie, Baba Looey, Mr. Jinks, Top Cat, Officer Dibble, Peter Potamus, George Jetson, Elroy Jetson, Astro, Mr. Spacely, Garfield, Fred Flintstone, Barney Rubble, Mr. Slate, Dino, Lippy the Lion, Mr. Incredible, Hadji, Dr. Benton C. Quest, Race Bannon, Squiddly Diddly, Fleegle, Droopy, Eustace Bagge and Mr. Potato Head.

== Personal life ==
Bergman lives in Los Angeles, California. He is married to Carla Delaney and they have two sons.

== Filmography ==
=== Film ===
List of performances in film
Year	Title	Role	Notes
1990	The Funtastic World of Hanna-Barbera	George Jetson, Ghosts, Police Chief	Short film
1990	Gremlins 2: The New Batch	Bugs Bunny, Daffy Duck, Porky Pig	Looney Tunes segments
1990	Jetsons: The Movie	George Jetson, Mr. Spacely, Basketball Coach	Stand-in for both George O'Hanlon and Mel Blanc after their deaths in 1989
1990	Box-Office Bunny	Bugs Bunny, Elmer Fudd, Daffy Duck	Short film
1991	(Blooper) Bunny	Bugs Bunny, Daffy Duck, Elmer Fudd, Yosemite Sam	Short film
1992	Invasion of the Bunny Snatchers	Bugs Bunny, Daffy Duck, Elmer Fudd, Yosemite Sam, Porky Pig	Short film
1998	The Secret of Mulan	Additional voices	Direct-to-video
2006	Porky and Daffy in the William Tell Overture	Porky Pig	Short film
2010	Tom and Jerry Meet Sherlock Holmes	Butch, Droopy	Direct-to-video
2010	Despicable Me	Additional Voices	
2012	Big Miracle	Ronald Reagan	
2012	Foodfight!	Charlie Tuna	
2013	Despicable Me 2	Additional Voices	
2014	The Lego Movie	Additional Voices	
2015	The Flintstones & WWE: Stone Age SmackDown!	Fred Flintstone	Direct-to-video
2015	Looney Tunes: Rabbits Run	Bugs Bunny, Daffy Duck, Foghorn Leghorn, Pepé Le Pew	Direct-to-video
2016	Batman: Return of the Caped Crusaders	The Joker	Direct-to-video
2017	The Jetsons & WWE: Robo-WrestleMania!	George Jetson, Mr. Spacely	Direct-to-video
2017	Tom and Jerry: Willy Wonka and the Chocolate Factory	Droopy, American Reporter	Direct-to-video
2017	Batman vs. Two-Face	The Joker, Bookworm, Desmond Dumas	
2017	Despicable Me 3	Additional Voices	
2021	Tom & Jerry	Droopy	Uncredited
2021	Space Jam: A New Legacy	Bugs Bunny, Sylvester, Yosemite Sam, Yogi Bear, Fred Flintstone	
2021	Straight Outta Nowhere: Scooby-Doo! Meets Courage the Cowardly Dog	Eustace Bagge, Computer, Mayor	Direct-to-video
2026	Toy Story 5	Mr. Potato Head	Replacing Don Rickles
2026	Daffy Season	Bugs Bunny, Elmer Fudd, Yosemite Sam, Porky Pig	Short film

=== Television ===
List of performances on television
Year	Title	Role	Notes
1984	The New Show	Walter Kronkite's Wonderful World of Bloopers Announcer, Fred Flintstone, Barney Rubble, George Jetson	
1986	The Bugs Bunny Show	Additional Voices	
1990	Cartoon All-Stars to the Rescue	Bugs Bunny, Daffy Duck	TV short, first to voice after Blanc's death
1990	The Earth Day Special	Bugs Bunny, Tweety, Porky Pig	
1990–1991	Tiny Toon Adventures	Bugs Bunny, Daffy Duck, Foghorn Leghorn, Elmer Fudd, Tasmanian Devil, Yosemite Sam, Sylvester, Tweety, Additional voices	
1991	Bugs Bunny's Lunar Tunes	Bugs Bunny, Pepé Le Pew	TV short
1991	Bugs Bunny's Overtures to Disaster	Bugs Bunny, Daffy Duck, Porky Pig, Elmer Fudd, Yosemite Sam, Sylvester, Papa Bear, Mr. Meek	TV short
1992	Bugs Bunny's Creature Features	Bugs Bunny, Daffy Duck, Elmer Fudd, Yosemite Sam	
1992	The Plucky Duck Show	Foghorn Leghorn, Daffy Duck	Episodes: "A Quack in the Quarks", "A Ditch in Time" and "Slugfest/Duck Dodgers Jr./Duck Trek"
1996–1999	Doug	Coach Spitz	
2000–2015	Boomerang	Commercial Announcer	
2001	The Flintstones: On the Rocks	Fred Flintstone, Parking Guard, Vendor	TV movie
2001	The Jetsons: Father & Son Day	George Jetson, Elroy Jetson, Mr. Cosmo Spacely	TV movie
2002	Harvey Birdman, Attorney at Law	George Jetson, Bakov, Clown	Episode: "Shaggy Busted"
2002	The Jetsons: The Best Son	George Jetson, Elroy Jetson, Robot Boy	
2003	Cartoon Network's Funniest Bloopers and Other Embarrassing Moments	Porky Pig, Fred Flintstone, Barney Rubble, George Jetson, Foghorn Leghorn, Barnyard Dawg, Henery Hawk	TV short
2004	Johnny Bravo	Fred Flintstone	Episode: "Wilderness Protection Program/A Page Right Out of History"
2006–present	Family Guy	Fred Flintstone, Sylvester the Cat, Max Weinstein, Victor, Homer Simpson	
2008, 2009	Seth MacFarlane's Cavalcade of Cartoon Comedy	Host, Fred Flintstone	Episodes: "A Dog on the $25,000 Pyramid" "Fred and Barney Try to Get Into a Club" "Fred Flintstone Takes a Shit"
2010	The Cleveland Show	Alda-nator, Garrison Keillor	Episodes: "Love Rollercoaster" "Buried Pleasure"
2011–2014	The Looney Tunes Show	Bugs Bunny, Daffy Duck, Sylvester, Tweety, Foghorn Leghorn, Pepé Le Pew, Girardi	
2012	Cartoon Network 20th Anniversary	Bugs Bunny, Daffy Duck	
2013	Mad	Daffy Duck, Elmer Fudd, James P. Sullivan, Dan Schneider	Episodes: "First White House Down/McDuck Dynasty" "Iron Bland 3/Monsters Community" "World War ZZZ/SHAZAM! & Cat"
2014	Rick and Morty	Additional voices	Episode: "Rixty Minutes"
2014	Phineas and Ferb	Additional voices	Episode: "The Klimpaloon Ultimatum"
2014	Mike Tyson Mysteries	Elton John, Elon Musk, Robert Redford, The Phantasm	Voice
2015–2020	New Looney Tunes	Bugs Bunny, Sylvester, Foghorn Leghorn, Elmer Fudd, Michigan J. Frog, Mac Gopher, Giant, Boyd (season 2), Poochini	Voice
2016	American Dad	Additional voices	Episode: "Next of Pin"
2018	We Bare Bears	Narrator	Episode: "El Oso"
2018–2020	Our Cartoon President	Donald Trump, Lou Dobbs, Joe Biden, Bill de Blasio, John F. Kennedy	Voice
2019	Amphibia	Jonah, Additional voices	Episode: "Cracking Mrs. Croaker"
2020	Yabba-Dabba Dinosaurs	Fred Flintstone, Mr. Slate	Voice
2020–2023	Looney Tunes Cartoons	Sylvester, Elmer Fudd, Foghorn Leghorn, Ralph Wolf	Voice
2020	Jurassic World Camp Cretaceous	Mr. DNA	Voice
2020	Animaniacs	Sylvester	Episode: "Suffragette City"
2021–2025	Jellystone!	Yogi Bear, Ranger Smith, Wally Gator, Mr. Jinks, Lippy the Lion, Dirty Dawg, Snake, Fred Flintstone, George Jetson, Ookla the Mok, Ork, Blip, Gus Holiday, Tundro	Voice
2022	Pibby	Fred Flintstone	Voice
2022	Ada Twist, Scientist	Tooth Troll	Episode: "Tooth Fairy Bells"
2022–2025	Bugs Bunny Builders	Sylvester, Foghorn Leghorn, Elmer Fudd	Voice
2023–2025	Tiny Toons Looniversity	Bugs Bunny, Sylvester, Foghorn Leghorn	Voice
2023	What If...?	Odin	Voice (2 episodes)

=== Video games ===
Year	Title	Role	Notes
1992	Taz-Mania	Tasmanian Devil	Sega Genesis version
1994	Flintstones/Jetsons: Timewarp	Fred Flintstone, Barney Rubble, Dino, Baby Puss, George Jetson, Rosie the Robot Maid, Mr. Spacely, Officer, Satellite Number 4-15 Pilot, Spacely's Sprockets Computer, Muscle Trainer 3000, Interstellar Express Ship, Sleeping Worker, R.U.D.I., Ring Salesman, Food Rack Cycle, Alpha Seltxer 3000, Apollo Anti-Gravity Dish Machine, Garbage Disposatizer 3000, Encyclopedia Titanic, Alphabet Machine, Tree Brontosaurus, Mower-a-Saurus, Elephant, Bear Rug, Birds, Gravaldo, Movie Dinosaur, Caveman, Bathing Dinosaur, Compactosaurus, Dishwasher Pelican, Sawing Bird, Hammering Bird, Office Worker, Caveman, Dinosaur, Groks, Caveman Tourist	
1994	Taz in Escape from Mars	Tasmanian Devil	
2011	Skylanders: Spyro's Adventure	Zap	
2012	The Expendables 2 Videogame	Barney Ross	
2012	Skylanders: Giants	Zap	
2013	Skylanders: Swap Force	Zap	
2014	Scooby-Doo and Looney Tunes: Cartoon Universe	Bugs Bunny, Daffy Duck, Foghorn Leghorn, Sylvester	
2014	Skylanders: Trap Team	Zap	
2014	Looney Tunes Dash!	Bugs Bunny, Daffy Duck, Elmer Fudd, Yosemite Sam, Tweety, Sylvester, Tasmanian Devil, Tasmanian She-Devil, Foghorn Leghorn, Beaky Buzzard	
2015	The Flintstones	Fred Flintstone, Barney Rubble	Slot machine
2015	Skylanders: SuperChargers	Zap	
2016	Ice Age: Arctic Blast	Manny	
2016	Skylanders: Imaginators	Zap	
2018	Lego The Incredibles	Bob Parr / Mr. Incredible	
2018	The Flintstones: Welcome to Bedrock	Fred Flintstone, Barney Rubble	Slot machine
2018	Yogi Bear	Yogi Bear, Ranger Smith	Slot machine
2020	Call of Duty: Black Ops Cold War	Ronald Reagan	
2024	Looney Tunes: Wacky World of Sports	Sylvester the Cat, Foghorn Leghorn, Ralph Wolf, Sam Sheepdog	

=== Theme parks ===
Year	Title	Role	Notes
2015	Wun Wabbit Wun	Bugs Bunny, Daffy Duck, Elmer Fudd	
2017	Daffy Duck Dance Off	Daffy Duck, Bugs Bunny, Sylvester, Tweety	
2018	The Flintstones Bedrock River Adventure	Fred Flintstone, Barney Rubble	
2018	Meet Bugs (And Daffy)	Bugs Bunny, Daffy Duck, Sylvester	
2018	Ani-Mayhem	Bugs Bunny, Daffy Duck, Sylvester, Tweety, Elmer Fudd, Barnyard Dawg	

Preceded by Mel Blanc	Voice of Bugs Bunny; 1990–1993, 1997–1998, 2002–2004, 2007, 2011–present	Succeeded by Greg Burson (1990-2000); None (2011-present)
Preceded by Mel Blanc	Voice of Daffy Duck; 1989–1993, 1997, 2002–2004, 2007, 2011–present	Succeeded by Joe Alaskey (1990-2011, 2014); Eric Bauza (2018-2026); None (2011-present)
Preceded by Mel Blanc	Voice of Elmer Fudd; 1990–1992, 1997, 2002–2004, 2013–present	Succeeded by Greg Burson (1990-2001); None (2013-present)
Preceded by Mel Blanc	Voice of Foghorn Leghorn; 1990–1993, 2002–2004, 2011–present	Succeeded by Greg Burson (1990-2003); None (2011-present)
Preceded by Mel Blanc	Voice of Sylvester the Cat; 1989–1993, 1997–1998, 2002–2004, 2007, 2011–present	Succeeded by Joe Alaskey (1990-2011); None (2011-present)
Preceded by Mel Blanc	Voice of Tweety; 1990–1993, 2004, 2011–present	Succeeded by Bob Bergen (1990-2021); Eric Bauza (2018-2026); None (2011-present)
Preceded by Greg Burson	Voice of Yogi Bear; 1992–present	Succeeded by None
Preceded by Corey Burton	Voice of Ranger Smith; 2001-present	Succeeded by None
Preceded by Henry Corden	Voice of Fred Flintstone; 1984, 1994-present	Succeeded by None
Preceded by George O'Hanlon	Voice of George Jetson; 1984, 1990-present	Succeeded by None
Preceded by Mel Blanc	Voice of Mr. Spacely; 1990-present	Succeeded by None
Preceded by Paul Frees	Voice of Pillsbury Doughboy; 1986-2014	Succeeded by JoBe Cerny
Preceded by Don Messick	Voice of Droopy; 1999–2010, 2017–2024	Succeeded by Joe Alaskey (2004, 2010-2016); None (2017-present)
Preceded by Lionel Wilson	Voice of Eustace Bagge; 2012, 2021–present	Succeeded by Arthur Anderson (2002-2006)
