= Howard Hoffman =

American actor

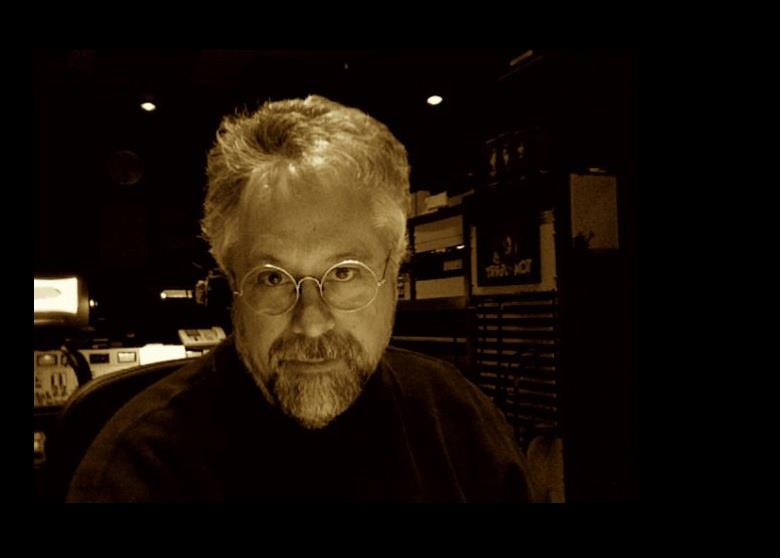
- Hoffman in 2011
- Born: Suffern, New York, U.S.
- Occupations: Radio personality, Voice actor, Producer/Creator of radio imaging
- Known for: The Howard Hoffman Show, Howard and Stephanie, KABC Radio
- Website: www.howardhoffman.com

Howard Hoffman is an American voice actor and a broadcast branding producer in New York City. He also operates the internet radio station Great Big Radio. He was also a presenter of Contemporary Hit Radio shows in New York City, Chicago, San Francisco, Providence, Phoenix, and Houston.

Hoffman is currently the Creative Services/Production Director of WOR (AM)/iHeartMedia New York.

== Early career ==
Hoffman's first radio job came in 1971 during his senior year in Suffern High School. An English Teacher (and faculty adviser of the school radio station WSHS), Hank Gross, was working at WTBQ Radio in Warwick, New York on weekends and brought in Hoffman to do odd jobs like news-gathering, music filing and an occasional newscast. The station hired him full-time shortly thereafter, and he did the 2p.m.-to-signoff shift. While finishing his final year in high school, Hoffman also took on the role of music director, and the station made a transition from a "beautiful music" format to a more adult contemporary sound.

After a brief stint in Spring Valley, New York, Hoffman landed his first Top 40 job doing evenings on WALL in Middletown, New York in 1973. It was here where Hoffman found his voice, relying heavily on listener phone participation. What set the show apart was the inclusion of local and national pop culture topics as well as humorously touching on the news as part of the show's fabric, along with the hits and oldies. Hoffman said, "… that's where I first started doing stuff like putting callers on the air, clowning around with them, hanging up on them … and they loved it." Hoffman also included pre-recorded parodies and sketches, which were a coveted talent that set apart the top DJ entertainers. This did not go unnoticed, and in 1974, he was hired at WDRQ in Detroit for his production and on-air skills.

== New York City and Beyond ==
In 1975, Hoffman was picked up by WPIX-FM in New York City – originally as a fill-in host before taking the reins as WPIX's permanent evening host on the station's "Disco 102." After initial success, the disco craze eventually fizzled, so Hoffman set his sights on an area he always loved, New England.

This drew him to WPRO-FM in Providence, Rhode Island, which gave him the freedom to do an evening show with more humor and poking fun at the music he had to play. This sparked some conversations with listeners who took on Hoffman – either in agreement or rage. A highlight of Hoffman's tenure happened on February 5, 1978, during the Northeastern United States blizzard of 1978. He and several other WPRO AM and FM staffers were stranded at the radio station for three days. With the FM discontinued and its transmitter unreachable, WPRO's AM and FM staff double-teamed on the AM and brought non-stop news and information to the area. Hoffman calls this his "first true radio moment" – in how the medium can be a force in bringing a community together in an emergency.

== WABC ==
In 1979, Rick Sklar, vice president in charge of programming for ABC Radio, sought out and hired Hoffman to take over the evening show at their Houston FM station, KAUM. The station had just switched formats to CHR (contemporary hit radio – the new moniker for "Top 40") and despite his New York upbringing, Hoffman was a hit at KAUM, bringing the station to within striking distance of the long-established CHR leader, KRBE.

In late 1979, Hoffman got what everyone in the radio business refers to as "THE call" when WABC, New York, program director Al Brady Law offered him the coveted evening slot as part of a major restructuring of WABC's lineup. As it turned out, it was while Hoffman was in Providence that Law listened to his show while Law was programming WHDH in Boston. Hoffman jumped at the chance and became one of the last on-air hires of WABC's MusicRadio era.

To accommodate his phone-intensive act, WABC installed an extra mixing board and a telephone hybrid system – something the station never used previously. Ten minutes into his very first night, he showed his self-deprecating side when he said "hello" to his parents listening in Suffern – then said, "Who am I kidding? They tuned out of this mess five minutes ago."

Hoffman's high-energy delivery was a shock for many WABC listeners, who were accustomed to the station's more "adult" approach. Critics weren't kind to this sudden shift and wondered what WABC was thinking. However, everyone involved was aware that FM was beginning to dominate the radio landscape, and Hoffman's arrival was designed to be part of a game-changer for the station. Long time afternoon fixture Dan Ingram was moved to mornings, Ingram sound-alike Bob Cruz was placed in the afternoons and Sturgis Griffin was brought in for overnights.

Hoffman's tenure at WABC was marked by two diverse events. First was his now notorious 1979 New Year's Eve show, just two weeks into his job. It was a huge in-studio party with WABC and WPLJ engineers, staffers and announcers while Hoffman counted down the top 100 of the year. That show continued almost two hours into 1980 before he finally reached number one. The second was the night of the killing of John Lennon, shortly after Hoffman took the helm of the overnight show. WABC became a mix of all-news and all-Beatles throughout that night, with Hoffman anchoring the event.

Despite an improvement in listenership, the handwriting was on the wall for AM's future, and WABC began the switch to talk in 1981 with the addition of the New York Yankees, which moved Hoffman to the all-night shift. Hoffman attempted to do an all-night talk show called The Phonebooth which was produced and co-written by his friend Tom Leykis. The show went unnoticed by WABC management, however, and Hoffman exited the station when he was replaced by WABC's first full-time talk show, Dr. Judith Kuriansky.

== The 1980s ==
Hoffman left New York to host his first morning show at KOPA in Phoenix, then moved to San Francisco in 1984 to help launch KMEL's new CHR format as their afternoon drive host. His three years at KMEL had several high points, including an appearance on NBC's Miami Vice, a charity auction of Madonna's "Like a Virgin" wedding dress, a stint as a WWE wrestling manager and an ongoing war with fans of Duran Duran (which was ended by a surprise in-studio visit by the group).

Following a short morning stint at KKFR in Phoenix, Hoffman returned to New York to co-host the "Howard and Stephanie" morning show on dance-oriented CHR Hot 97 (WQHT). He and Stephanie Miller occupied that slot for the better part of four years before the station went toward a more hardcore hip-hop format. During this time, he landed in the "Top 40 DJs of All Time" list compiled by Decalcomania.

== Voiceover and production careers ==
Hoffman went back to San Francisco to sell the property he bought during his KMEL era and did a short stint at KFRC. It was there where he signed with Look Talent and began pursuing his voiceover career. Leykis then let him know that KABC/KMPC in Los Angeles needed a production director (KMPC carried Leykis' syndicated show at the time). The program director was none other than Al Brady Law, who hired Hoffman at WABC. Law was convinced that Hoffman would not stand for a behind-the-scenes job for more than three months, but they reached a deal nonetheless in 1994. Hoffman's tenure at KABC would last 17 1/2 years. Among the awards for creative radio promotions he received were two first place RAP awards in 2008 for two parody spots: "Obama/McCain Season" in which Hoffman did the voices of Bugs Bunny and Daffy Duck for the 2008 presidential campaign; and "KABC vs TV", a sendup of Apple's "Mac vs PC" spots. He won the same award again in 2016 for a campaign for KXL in Portland, "We Will Inform You," a reboot of Queen's "We Will Rock You."

His voice acting credits include all the characters in the Academy Award-nominated animated short The Chicken from Outer Space – the pilot for Courage the Cowardly Dog. He also worked on the series Jackie Chan Adventures and on several projects for Warner Bros. and Toon Disney. His commercial credits include REI, Hostess, Kraft, the Los Angeles Dodgers, Ford, Anheuser-Busch, Audi, Post Cereals, Wawa Markets, Mattel, NBC, T-Mobile and many more. He is signed with DPN Talent of Beverly Hills for his voice acting.

On July 15, 2019, Hoffman was named Creative Services/Production Director of WOR (AM)/iHeartMedia New York.

In 2025, Hoffman returned to his roots as an air personality at Connoisseur Media's WEBE in Connecticut.
