= Paul Schoeffler =

Canadian actor

- Born: November 21, 1958 (age 67); Montreal, Quebec, Canada
- Occupations: Voice actor, stage, TV, film actor
- Years active: 1989–present

Paul Schoeffler (born November 21, 1958) is a Canadian stage, film, television and voice actor.

== Career ==
Schoeffler provides the voices for many characters on the Cartoon Network animated series Courage the Cowardly Dog. He has also made guest appearances on Midnight Caller and Law & Order.

In 2001, he starred as Lumiere in Beauty and the Beast on Broadway. In 2017, he appeared on Broadway as Cecil B. DeMille and understudy Max von Mayerling in Sunset Boulevard. He has also acted on stages such as Philadelphia's Walnut Street Theatre, portraying characters such as Don Quixote from Man of La Mancha, Javert from Les Misérables (a role he also played on the US tour), and Captain Hook from Peter Pan; and Sweet Charity among others. He originated the role of the German developer Hertz in the Broadway cast of Rock of Ages and returned to the role on October 26, 2009, following a three-month absence where he played Lawrence Jameson in the Walnut Street Theatre production of Dirty Rotten Scoundrels.

== Filmography ==
=== Film ===
Year	Title	Role	Notes	Source
2021	Straight Outta Nowhere: Scooby-Doo! Meets Courage the Cowardly Dog	Katz, Le Quack, Nowhere Newsman	Voices	

=== Television ===
Year	Title	Role	Notes	Source
1989	Midnight Caller	Poker Player - Host	Episode: "Fathers and Sins"	
1999-2002	Courage the Cowardly Dog	Nowhere Newsman, Cajun Fox, Katz, Le Quack, Freaky Fred, Dr. Vindaloo, Big Toe, Cat Thief #2, The Goose God, Errol Von Volkheim, The Snowman, Bobby Ganoush, Jeeves Weevil, Dr. Zalost	Voices; 52 episodes	
1996-2002	Law & Order	Mr. Hazlitt, Harry Thompson	2 episodes	
2014	The Fog of Courage	The Computer	Voice	

=== Video games ===
Year	Title	Role	Notes	Source
2006	Neverwinter Nights 2	Casavir	Voice; Credited as Paul Schoeffer	
2008	Order Up!	Sir Edmund Waddleberry, Jacques Jean-Pierre Francois, Generic Patron	Voices	
