= Straight Outta Nowhere: Scooby-Doo! Meets Courage the Cowardly Dog =

2021 animated film by Cecilia Aranovich Hamilton

- DVD slipcover
- Directed by: Cecilia Aranovich Hamilton
- Written by: Michael Ryan
- Based on: Scooby-Doo by Joe Ruby & Ken Spears; Courage the Cowardly Dog by John R. Dilworth
- Produced by: Cecilia Aranovich Hamilton
- Starring: Frank Welker; Grey Griffin; Matthew Lillard; Kate Micucci; Jeff Bergman; Marty Grabstein; Thea White
- Edited by: Dave Courter
- Music by: Jody Gray; Andy Ezrin
- Production company: Warner Bros. Animation
- Distributed by: Warner Bros. Home Entertainment
- Release date: September 14, 2021
- Running time: 78 minutes
- Country: United States
- Language: English

Straight Outta Nowhere: Scooby-Doo! Meets Courage the Cowardly Dog is a 2021 American animated mystery film produced by Warner Bros. Animation, and is the 36th entry in the direct-to-video series of Scooby-Doo films. The film also serves as a crossover between Scooby-Doo and the Cartoon Network show Courage the Cowardly Dog. The film was released on DVD and Digital on September 14, 2021.

The film is set in Nowhere, Kansas, where the co-protagonists encounter a giant Cicada Queen. They discover that the cicada's unnatural size and every other strange encounter which Courage has dealt with were the result of a dark matter meteor located under Courage's residence.

== Plot ==
While unmasking a bank-robbing clown, Scooby-Doo hears a strange noise and is driven to dance before he runs off. Meanwhile, Courage appears to be having the same problem, though Muriel and Eustace don't seem to notice. The gang rushes after Scooby, only to find that they have ended up in Nowhere, Kansas, where many hostile cicadas are surrounding Courage and Scooby. After they kill the cicadas, Muriel calls them over to the Bagge household, where they properly meet her and Eustace.

Both the Scooby gang and the Bagge family are invited to dinner with the Mayor of Nowhere. On the way there, Scooby and Courage are attacked by a giant Cicada Queen, resulting in the destruction of Eustace's truck. Arriving at the Mayor of Nowhere's mansion, they are offered a tour of an attached museum detailing Nowhere's bizarre history of attracting weirdness to the town. Shaggy, Scooby and Courage look for something to eat, while Eustace heads back to the Bagge residence. Shaggy, Scooby and Courage are attacked by the Cicada Queen, whose brood knocks Fred, Daphne, Velma and Muriel into a hidden cave. There, they discover a strange machine randomly sending out cellphone calls; Shaggy, Scooby and Courage destroy it while escaping the Cicada Queen. At the Bagge residence, Eustace makes a Shaggy-esque sandwich when he gets guests at the door. Each visitor is one of the call recipients and they leave large amounts of money.

Attempting to return to the Bagge residence to unravel the mystery, the group is once again attacked by the Cicada Queen, which kidnaps most of them, leaving only Scooby and Courage behind. Plugging Velma's personal tablet into Courage's computer, they discover that the cicada's unnatural size and every other strange encounter Courage dealt with was the result of a dark matter meteor, the one presumably to have wiped out the dinosaurs, which is buried under the spot where the Bagge residence is. Courage and Scooby retrieve the meteor and rescue the gang. Their attempt to escape is thwarted by the Cicada Queen, who takes the meteor and holds Muriel hostage, forcing Courage to face his fears and confront it. After a long battle, the Cicada Queen is trapped under scraps from the Bagge windmill.

The General and the Lieutenant soon arrive to apprehend the Cicada Queen, which is revealed to be a mech piloted by Katz and Le Quack. After discovering the meteor's existence, they teamed up to take over Nowhere's political facilities and to use the resources to dig up the meteor to hypnotize and rob several well-off locals, stashing it at the Bagge residence. When they learned that the Scooby gang was in the area, they used the meteor to brainwash the local cicada population to scare them off in an attempt to "up their game". The General attempts to secure the meteor to be used ostensibly as a weapon, but at Courage's suggestion, it is turned into a Disco ball so the group can celebrate.

== Voice cast ==
- Frank Welker as Scooby-Doo and Fred Jones
- Grey Griffin as Daphne Blake and Frau Glockenspiel
- Matthew Lillard as Shaggy Rogers
- Kate Micucci as Velma Dinkley and Velma's Tablet
- Jeff Bennett as General and Self Help Book
- Marty Grabstein as Courage, Evil Clown, Mr. McGill
- Jeff Bergman as Eustace Bagge, Computer, Mayor of Nowhere
- Chuck Montgomery as Lieutenant and Mr. Glockenspiel
- Paul Schoeffler as Katz, Le Quack, Nowhere Newsman
- Thea White as Muriel Bagge and Rich Old Lady

== Production ==
John R. Dilworth, the original creator of Courage the Cowardly Dog, was not involved with the film's production. Marty Grabstein and Thea White reprised their roles as Courage and Muriel Bagge, while voice actor Jeff Bergman voiced Eustace Bagge, taking over from actors Lionel Wilson and Arthur Anderson, due to their deaths in 2003 and 2016, respectively. Bergman had previously voiced Eustace prior in a commercial advert for Cartoon Network's 20th anniversary in 2012.

The crossover marks the final acting credit of Thea White, who died during surgery on July 30, 2021, due to liver cancer, and the film was dedicated to her memory.

== Release ==
The film was released on DVD and Digital HD by Warner Bros. Home Entertainment on September 14, 2021.

== Reception ==
Dillon Gonzales, writing for Geek Vibes Nation, gave the film a positive review, saying "there are moments that feel a bit padded to justify a feature-length effort, but it is easy to give them a pass as you enjoy spending time with these characters". Becky O'Brien of Cinelinx also gave a positive review, saying the film "exceeded all of my expectations. This is a movie fans of both series will enjoy. It is literally a love letter to everything that makes both Scooby-Doo and Courage the Cowardly Dog fun to watch".

Common Sense Media gave the film 2 out of 5 stars.

Boca do Inferno said, "it's worth it for the opportunity to see them again on stage, fighting monsters with fear, sympathy and a lot of voracity."
