= Thea White =

American voice actress (1940–2021)

- Born: Thea Ruth Zitzner; June 16, 1940; Newark, New Jersey, U.S.
- Died: July 30, 2021 (aged 81); Cleveland, Ohio, U.S.
- Occupations: Voice actress, librarian
- Years active: 1957–2021
- Spouse: Andy White (m. 1983; died 2015)

Thea Ruth White (née Zitzner; June 16, 1940 – July 30, 2021) was an American voice actress and librarian best known for her work as Muriel Bagge in the animated television series Courage the Cowardly Dog.

== Early life ==
White was born in Newark, New Jersey on June 16, 1940, as the daughter of Arthur and Theatrice (née Hazard) Zitzner. White's mother and maternal grandmother Eva were both actresses: Theatrice began acting as a child, and continued to do so as an adult, while Eva made her acting debut as a teenager and retired following marriage, later opening a movie theater with her husband. White moved to North Caldwell with her parents at the age of 12. She graduated from Grover Cleveland High School and studied acting at the Royal Academy of Dramatic Arts and the American Theater Wing.

== Career ==
White began her career on several stage productions in Dallas, Texas. While acting on stage, Broadway and theater, she served as the personal assistant for Marlene Dietrich, during Dietrich's later career.

After marrying her husband, White retired from acting and became a librarian and outreach specialist at the Livingston Public Library in Livingston, New Jersey. She returned to acting when she was offered the role of Muriel Bagge on Cartoon Network's Courage the Cowardly Dog. She also voiced Tulip in the Courage the Cowardly Dog episode "Tulip's Worm". She voiced Muriel during the entire series run, and reprised her role in the 2006 video game Cartoon Network Racing, the 2014 short The Fog of Courage, and the 2021 Scooby-Doo! crossover Straight Outta Nowhere: Scooby-Doo! Meets Courage the Cowardly Dog.

== Personal life and death ==
She had resided in Caldwell. She met her husband, Andy White, while acting in the play Goodbye Charlie; they later married in 1983 and remained so until his death in 2015. Andy was best known as the man who played drums on The Beatles' first single "Love Me Do".

White died from an infection at the Cleveland Clinic, on July 30, 2021, at the age of 81. She had undergone two liver cancer-related surgeries in the days leading up to her death.

== Work ==
Year	Title	Role	Notes
1999–2002	Courage the Cowardly Dog	Muriel Bagge	
2002	The 1st 13th Annual Fancy Anvil Awards Show Program Special	Muriel Bagge	
2006	Cartoon Network Racing	Muriel Bagge	
2014	The Fog of Courage	Muriel Bagge	
2021	Straight Outta Nowhere: Scooby-Doo! Meets Courage the Cowardly Dog	Muriel Bagge, Rich Old Lady	Posthumous release; final film role
