= Courage the Cowardly Dog =

American animated television series

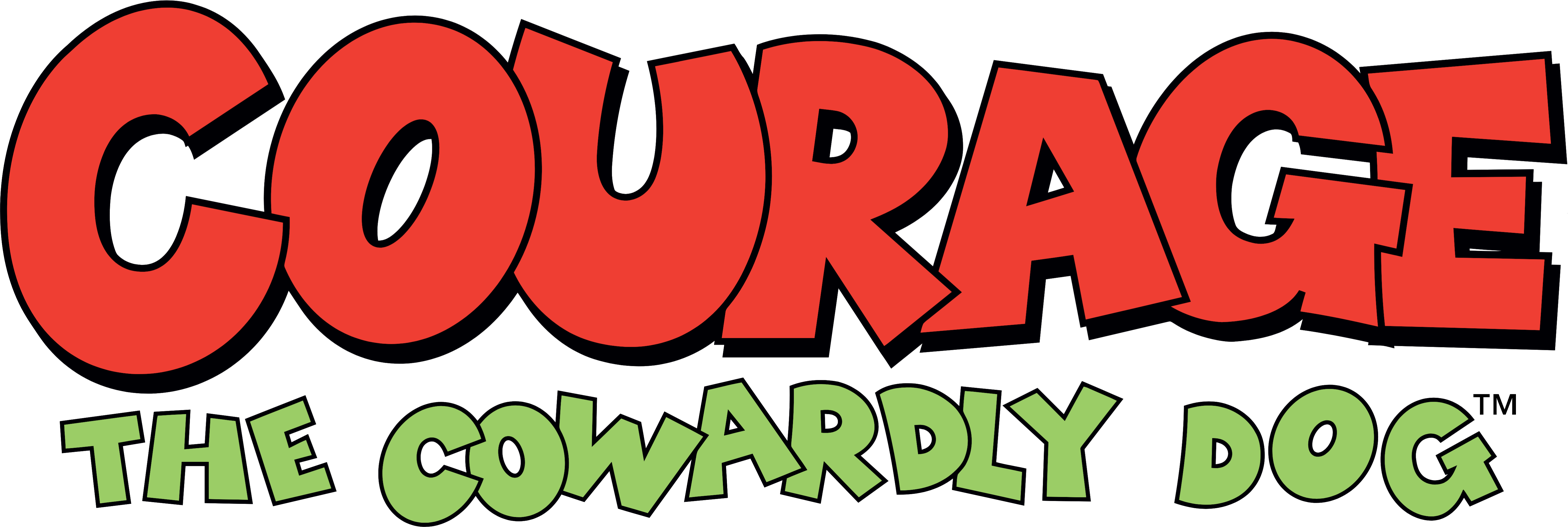
- Genre: Black comedy; Horror comedy; Science fantasy; Slapstick; Surreal comedy
- Created by: John R. Dilworth
- Directed by: John R. Dilworth
- Voices of: Marty Grabstein; Thea White; Lionel Wilson; Arthur Anderson; Paul Schoeffler
- Composers: Jody Gray; Andy Ezrin
- Country of origin: United States
- Original language: English
- No. of seasons: 4
- No. of episodes: 52 (102 segments) (list of episodes)

Production
- Executive producer: John R. Dilworth
- Producers: Robert Winthrop; Winnie Chaffee
- Running time: 22 minutes (Note: 11 minutes per segment)
- Production companies: Stretch Films; Cartoon Network Studios (Note: Pilot only)

Original release
- Network: Cartoon Network
- Release: November 12, 1999 – November 22, 2002

Related
- What a Cartoon!

Courage the Cowardly Dog is an American animated comedy horror television series created by John R. Dilworth for Cartoon Network. It follows an anthropomorphic dog named Courage, who lives with an elderly couple, Muriel and Eustace Bagge, in the middle of Nowhere, a fictional town in Kansas. In each episode, Courage and his owners are thrown into paranormal or supernatural adventures. The series is known for its dark, surreal humor and atmosphere.

Dilworth pitched the series to Hanna-Barbera's animated shorts showcase What a Cartoon! and a pilot titled "The Chicken from Outer Space" aired on Cartoon Network on February 18, 1996. The segment was nominated for an Academy Award but lost to Wallace & Gromit: A Close Shave. The short was greenlit to become a series, which premiered on November 12, 1999, and ended on November 22, 2002, with four seasons consisting of 13 episodes each. It was nominated for three Golden Reel Awards and won one Annie Award.

== Premise ==
Courage the Cowardly Dog follows Courage (Marty Grabstein), a kind but easily frightened dog. He was abandoned as a puppy after his parents were forcibly sent into outer space by a crazy veterinarian. Soon after, he was found in an alleyway by Muriel Bagge (Thea White), a caring woman who decided to take Courage in as her own; the nature of this first meeting inspired her to give him his name. In the present, Courage lives in an isolated farmhouse in Kansas with Muriel and her husband Eustace Bagge (Lionel Wilson in episodes 1–33, Arthur Anderson in episodes 34–52), a cranky and greedy man who is jealous of Courage, refers to him as "stupid dog", and uses the "Ooga Booga" mask to scare him. The nearest town to the farmhouse is called Nowhere.

Courage and his owners frequently encounter monsters, aliens, zombies, and other paranormal or supernatural creatures that are attracted to Nowhere. Plots generally use conventions common to horror films. Although most of the creatures the three face are hostile, others suffer from distress, anger, and/or desperation, and sometimes are friendly. On occasion, some are even false antagonists.

The task of protecting Muriel and Eustace from such dangers falls on Courage, who endeavors to thwart or reconcile with the monster of the week and remedy or repair any damages done. Although Courage is occasionally aided with that task, the full extent of his efforts is usually performed unbeknownst to Muriel and Eustace. Ironically, given his name, Courage goes to great lengths to protect his owners, expressing much of his distress with over-the-top, piercing shrieks.

Although episodic in nature, there are a handful of recurring characters in the show's cast, including Courage's sarcastic, sentient computer (Simon Prebble); the family physician Dr. Vindaloo (Paul Schoeffler); a fortune-telling chihuahua named Shirley the Medium (Mary Testa); Eustace's mother "Ma" (Billie Lou Watt); some of the villains including Katz, Le Quack, Snowman (all three also voiced by Schoeffler), and the antagonistic Di Lung (Tim Chi Ly).

== Production ==
=== Creation ===
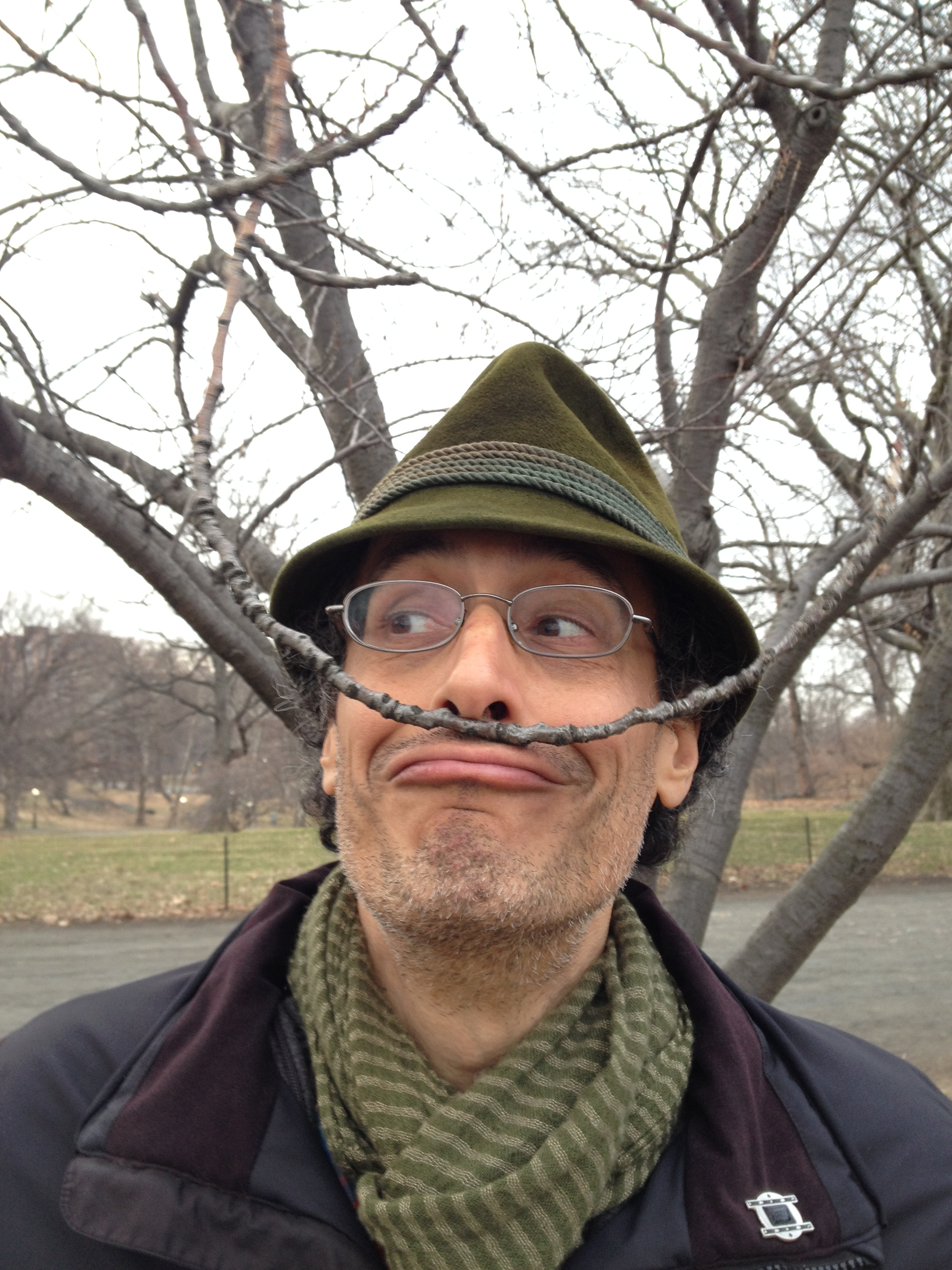
Series creator John R. Dilworth in 2014.

Originally, Courage the Cowardly Dog was created as a seven-minute animated short, "The Chicken from Outer Space". John R. Dilworth created the Courage animated short with his studio, Stretch Films, for Cartoon Network's What a Cartoon! showcase, which was executive produced by Hanna-Barbera. Dilworth graduated with a Bachelor of Fine Arts from the School of Visual Arts in New York in 1985. He became an art director and founded his own animation studio, Stretch Films, in 1991, and incorporated in 1994. The character of Courage grew out of an earlier character of Dilworth's called Hamilton, who appeared in Smart Talk with Raisin, a pilot Dilworth created for MTV.

The animated short was shown as one of the episodes of Cartoon Network's World Premiere Toons in 1996, a Hanna-Barbera Cartoons innovation by then-president Fred Seibert. The short served as a de facto pilot for the future series. The original animated short had no dialogue except for one line spoken by Courage, who had a more authoritative voice akin to Jackie Mason than in the series. It was uttered by voice actor Howard Hoffman who also provided all the other vocal sounds and effects for the short. An alien chicken was the villain in this short, who later reappears in the series to seek revenge. His sons also attempt to seek revenge in an even later episode. The short was nominated for the Academy Award for Best Animated Short Film at the 68th Academy Awards, but lost to the Wallace and Gromit short film A Close Shave.

=== Sound design ===
When deciding on sound effects, Dilworth tried to avoid pre-made stock sounds. He contributed a substantial amount of new material to sound designer Michael Geisler and only looked for sounds that made him laugh. The composition of the series' music relied on what was being portrayed: suspense, comedy, or action. The production crew collaborated on original music for the series. There were a few sections on one particular piece that Dilworth exceptionally liked. The production crew was able to isolate these sections and expand them into a usable theme.

Original music featured in Courage the Cowardly Dog was composed by Jody Gray and Andy Ezrin. Classical music can be heard at times, which pays homage to classic Warner Bros. animation and the scores of Carl Stalling. In several episodes, Gray arranged various famous classical pieces, such as Wagner's "Ride of the Valkyries", and wrote up to 15 songs.

=== Broadcast history ===
Courage the Cowardly Dog originally was premiered as a short on February 18, 1996. The show premiered on November 12, 1999, and became the highest-rated premiere in Cartoon Network history at the time. Previews for Courage the Cowardly Dog were shown in American movie theaters before Pokémon: The First Movie. It ended on November 22, 2002, with 52 episodes produced in four seasons.

== Episodes ==
In total, there were 52 episodes in four seasons produced, plus a pilot episode and a special episode. The series ran from November 12, 1999, to November 22, 2002.

Season	Segments	Episodes	Originally released	
Season	Segments	Episodes	First released	Last released
Pilot			February 18, 1996	
1	26	13	August 21, 1999	July 14, 2000
2	25	13	October 31, 2000	November 16, 2001
3	26	13	January 11, 2002	August 9, 2002
4	25	13	September 6, 2002	November 22, 2002
Special			October 31, 2014	
Crossover film			September 14, 2021	

== Reception ==
John G. Nettles of PopMatters reviewed the show and called it "a fascinating and textured mixture of cartoon and horror-movie conventions, and a joy to watch."

KJ Dell Antonia of Common Sense Media gave the show three stars out of five, with the summary "Cult fave 'toon plays over-the-top violence for laughs." Antonia warned parents that the series contains graphic animated violence, including "exploding organs, growing extra limbs, turning inside out, you name it". Randy Miller III of DVD Talk said that shows aimed at younger audiences "usually don't go for thrills and chills, so it's good to see a genuinely surreal and slanted series develop a decent following."

Jeff Swindoll of Monsters and Critics reviewed the first season DVD and praised all the episodes featured in the first season and encouraged fans to buy the season's DVD, but also noted the exclusion of the original Hanna-Barbera short The Chicken from Outer Space on the DVD. Courage the Cowardly Dog was ranked number five in Entertainment Weekly's 2012 list of "10 Best Cartoon Network Shows". In 2023, Indian entertainment journal Pinkvilla ranked the show no. 1 of their list of top 10 1990s cartoons and gave special praise to the episode "Courage in the Big Stinkin' City", stating that the show remains enjoyable in present times.

=== Awards and nominations ===
Year	Nominee / work	Award	Result
Academy Awards
1995	John R. Dilworth (for "The Chicken from Outer Space")	Best Animated Short Film	Nominated
Annie Awards
2000	John R. Dilworth (for "A Night at the Katz Motel")	Outstanding Individual Achievement for Production Design in an Animated Television Production	Won
Golden Reel Awards
2000	For "The Duck Brothers"	Best Sound Editing—Television Animated Series—Sound	Nominated
2001	For "Courage in the Big Stinkin' City"	Best Sound Editing—Television Animated Series—Sound	Won
2003	For "The Tower of Dr. Zalost"	Best Sound Editing—Television Animated Series—Sound	Nominated

== Merchandise ==
=== Home media ===
VHS editions of Scooby-Doo! and the Witch's Ghost and Scooby-Doo and the Alien Invaders each include an episode of Courage the Cowardly Dog as a bonus.

Courage the Cowardly Dog: Season One, a two-disc DVD set featuring all 13 episodes from the show's first season, was released in Australia (Region 4) on September 12, 2007, by Madman Entertainment. On January 13, 2010, the complete second season was also released, which as of 2023, is the only DVD release of "The Chicken from Outer Space".

A Region 1 release of the first season was done by Warner Home Video (via Warner Archive) on July 20, 2010. The release is the second in an official release of several Cartoon Cartoons on DVD, under the "Cartoon Network Hall of Fame" name. The second season was released on October 14, 2014, as the fourth in the "Hall of Fame" series. The third season was originally supposed to be released on DVD in Region 1 on February 2, 2016, but it was delayed to (and was released on) March 22, 2016. It is the fifth title in the Cartoon Network Hall of Fame series. The fourth and final season was released on September 27, 2016. Courage is one of the few Cartoon Network shows to be available as separate season sets in its entirety on DVD.

In addition, all four seasons of the series are available for download on Amazon Prime Video, iTunes, as well as on Tubi (added on March 1, 2026). The PlayStation 2 version of the video game Cartoon Network Racing contains the episodes "Robot Randy" and "The Magic Tree of Nowhere" as unlockable extras.

Courage the Cowardly Dog home video releases
Season		Episodes	Release dates	
Season		Episodes	United States	Australia
1	1999–2000	13	The Powerpuff Girls: Birthday Bash (VHS): November 7, 2000; Episode(s): "Journey to the Center of Nowhere" Cartoon Network Halloween: 9 Creepy Cartoon Capers: August 10, 2004; Episode(s): "The Demon in the Mattress" - "Courage Meets Bigfoot" Cartoon Network Halloween 2: Grossest Halloween Ever: August 9, 2005; Episode(s): "Night of the Weremole" The Complete First Season: July 20, 2010 4 Kid Favorites: The Hall of Fame Collection: March 13, 2012; Episode(s): "A Night at the Katz Motel" – "The Gods Must Be Goosey" 4 Kid Favorites: The Hall of Fame Collection Vol. 2: March 12, 2013; Episode(s): "Queen of the Black Puddle" – "The Great Fusilli" The Complete Series: October 2, 2018; Episode(s): Entire season featured	September 12, 2007
2	2000–01	13	Cartoon Network Halloween 2: Grossest Halloween Ever: August 9, 2005; Episode(s): "Courage Meets the Mummy" The Complete Second Season: October 14, 2014 The Complete Series: October 2, 2018; Episode(s): Entire season featured	January 13, 2010
3	2002	13	The Complete Third Season: March 22, 2016 The Complete Series: October 2, 2018; Episode(s): Entire season featured	—N/a
4	2002	13	Cartoon Network Christmas: Yuletide Follies: October 5, 2004; Episode(s): "The Nutcracker" The Complete Fourth Season: September 27, 2016 The Complete Series: October 2, 2018; Episode(s): Entire season featured	—N/a

=== Video games ===
Though the series has no official video games, characters from Courage the Cowardly Dog appear in the Cartoon Network games Cartoon Network Speedway, Cartoon Network: Block Party, Cartoon Network Racing, and Cartoon Network Universe: FusionFall.

== Possible revivals ==
In February 2012, BuzzFeed reported that a CGI special of Courage the Cowardly Dog was in development. The seven-minute special, titled The Fog of Courage, aired in 2014. Dilworth uploaded the special on his StretchFilms YouTube channel on March 14, 2024.

In October 2018, Dilworth commented on a Facebook post that he was in negotiations with Boomerang for a prequel to the series under the working title Before Courage. However, in May 2020, when asked about the project, Dilworth responded that it had been "transformed into another thing". In June 2021, Dilworth revealed that the project was on turnaround as Cartoon Network's management is prioritizing their focus on other projects. However, in January 2022, Dilworth revealed that the project has already been dropped and fell through for the same reason. On February 1, 2024, Dilworth uploaded the animatic pilot titled Goblins of Litter on his StretchFilms YouTube channel and on February 23, 2024, uploaded the same pilot with music and sound effects added.

== Crossover film ==
On June 22, 2021, Warner Bros. Animation announced an animated direct-to-video crossover film with Scooby-Doo called Straight Outta Nowhere: Scooby-Doo! Meets Courage the Cowardly Dog. The film follows Scooby-Doo and his friends finding a suspicious object in Nowhere, Kansas, where Courage and his owners reside.

Marty Grabstein and Thea White reprise their roles as Courage and Muriel, while Eustace is voiced by Jeff Bergman because of the deaths of the character's former voice casts Lionel Wilson and Arthur Anderson in 2003 and 2016, respectively. The film was released on DVD and digital on September 14, 2021. The film also serves as a posthumous role for Thea White, who died in July 2021, around two months before the film's release date. Series creator John R. Dilworth did not have any involvement in the crossover. According to animator and artist Tracy Mark Lee, the film's original premise was originally pitched as an episode of Scooby-Doo and Guess Who?
