= Arthur Anderson (actor) =

American actor (1922–2016)

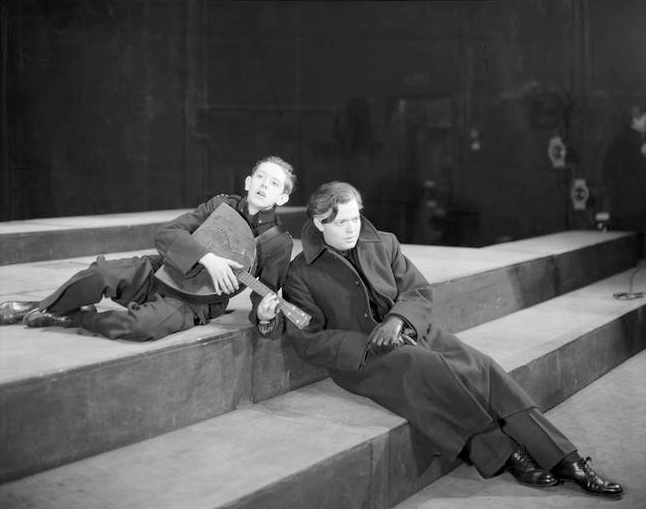
- Anderson (Lucius) and Orson Welles (Brutus) in the Mercury Theatre's Broadway production of Caesar (1937)
- Born: Arthur John Miles Anderson; August 29, 1922; Staten Island, New York, U.S.
- Died: April 9, 2016 (aged 93); Manhattan, New York, U.S.
- Occupation: Actor
- Years active: 1933–2016
- Spouse: Alice Middleton (m. 1963; died 2015)
- Children: 1

Arthur John Miles Anderson (August 29, 1922 – April 9, 2016) was an American actor of radio, film, television, and stage.

== Early years ==
Anderson was born August 29, 1922, on Staten Island, New York. His parents, George Christian Anderson and Violet Brookfield Anderson, came from Denmark and England respectively. He was educated at the Professional Children's School in Manhattan.

"He first came to radio through a children's community playhouse and started appearing regularly in 1934 on Uncle Nick Kenny's Radio Kindergarten at WMCA."

== Let's Pretend ==
As a child, he was heard on NBC in the role of the orphan Buddy on the radio network's musical serial drama, Tony and Gus (1935). The following year he joined the cast of Nila Mack's Let's Pretend and continued on that children's program until it came to an end in 1954. In 2004, he wrote a history of the show, Let's Pretend and the Golden Age of Radio (BearManor Media), which includes a foreword by Norman Corwin and a complete broadcast log by Derek Tague and Martin Grams, Jr.

== Other radio ==
Anderson acted in Welles's The Mercury Theatre on the Air, his CBS Radio series as characters in "Treasure Island", "Julius Caesar", and "Sherlock Holmes". Additional radio credits include the juvenile quiz show, March of Games (1938–1941), produced by Nila Mack and featuring many of the young actors from Let's Pretend.

== Stage ==
Anderson appeared in Orson Welles's Mercury Theatre production of Caesar on Broadway, as portrayed as the character Richard Samuels in the 2008 film Me and Orson Welles. His other Broadway credits include 1776, Il Trovatore, Aida, Carmen, Good Neighbor, and The Shoemakers' Holiday.

== From serials to cereals ==
Beginning in 1963 he was the voice of the General Mills Lucky Charms mascot Lucky the Leprechaun, continuing the character for 29 years even though he is not Irish. In 2005, he recalled:

People have expectations. I just have an Irish-sounding name. I have reason to celebrate. I had the luck of the Irish to get that part. I never got free cereal, but they gave me lots of green money. And it was a fun character to play. Hardly a day goes by when somebody doesn't ask me to sing the Lucky Charms jingle, and I'm proud of that.

== Television and film ==
Anderson succeeded Lionel Wilson as the voice of Eustace Bagge in Courage the Cowardly Dog. His film credits include Midnight Cowboy, Zelig, Green Card and I'm Not Rappaport, and his onscreen television appearances include episodes of Car 54, Where Are You?, Route 66, and Law & Order.

== Later years ==
Late in life, Anderson was active in Friends of Old Time Radio, a group that recreated broadcasts using the original scripts and was a regular participant in their conventions. He appeared at the convention 30 times, the most of any actor. He appeared at the very last convention on October 23, 2011. In 2012, he took on the role of honorary chairman for the successor event to Friends of Old Time Radio, NY OTR, which took place on October 12–13, 2012.

== Personal life and death ==
Anderson was married to casting director Alice Middleton. They had one daughter.

Anderson died at his Manhattan home on April 9, 2016, at age 93.

== Autobiography ==
An Actor's Odyssey: Orson Welles to Lucky the Leprechaun, by Arthur Anderson. Albany, 2010. BearManor Media. ISBN 1-59393-522-6.
