= List of Courage the Cowardly Dog episodes =

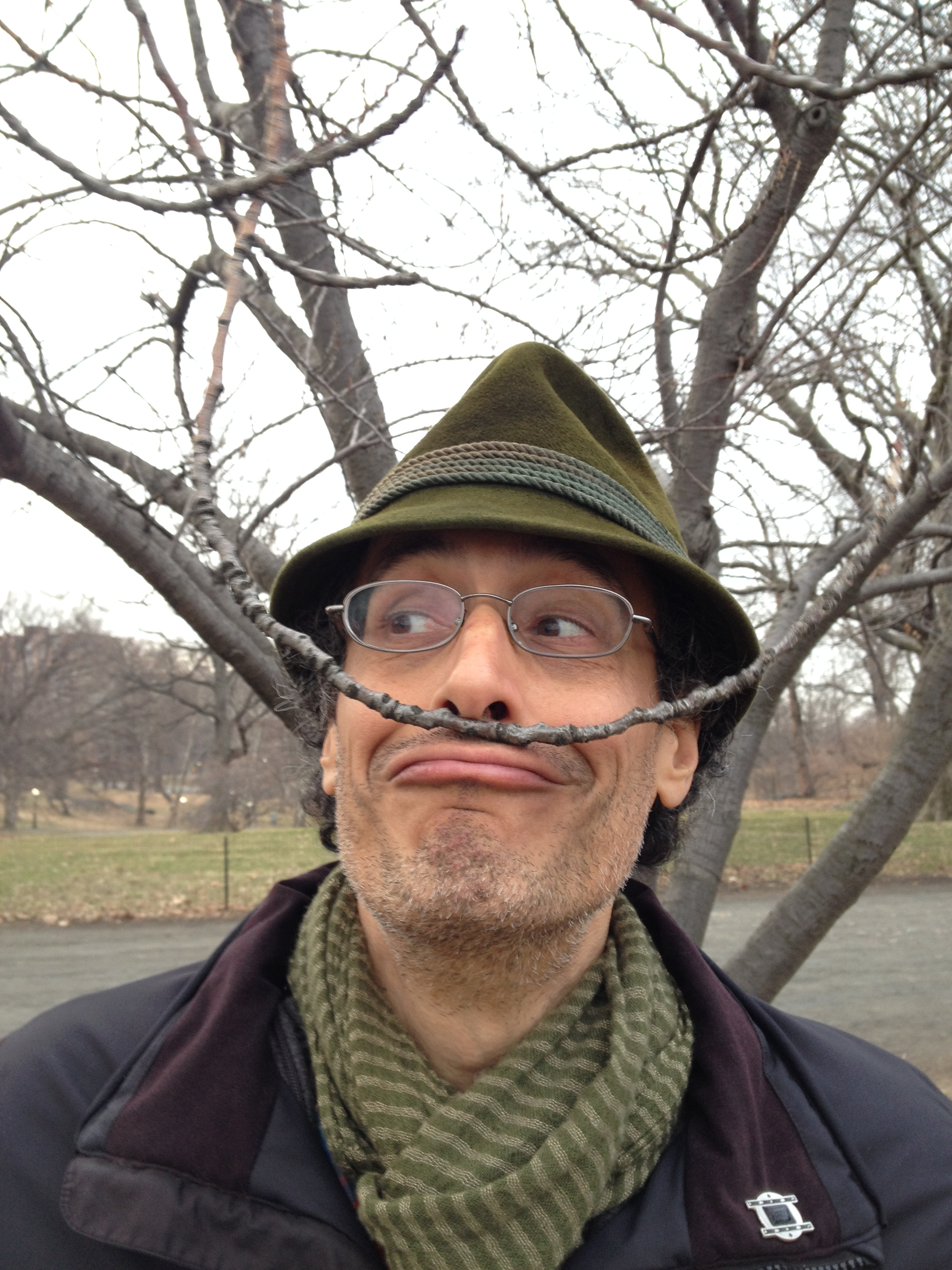
John R. Dilworth created Courage the Cowardly Dog as a short film titled "The Chicken from Outer Space" for What a Cartoon! in 1996. The short was picked up for a full series, airing for four seasons between 1999 and 2002.

Courage the Cowardly Dog is an American animated television series created and directed by John R. Dilworth. The pilot episode, "The Chicken from Outer Space", originally aired as part of What a Cartoon! on February 18, 1996. The series officially premiered on Cartoon Network on November 12, 1999, and ended on November 22, 2002, with a total of 52 episodes over the course of four seasons. A CGI special titled "The Fog of Courage" was broadcast on Cartoon Network in Southeast Asia on October 31, 2014. The series is about an anthropomorphic dog named Courage, who lives with an elderly couple in Nowhere, Kansas. In each episode, the trio are thrown into bizarre and frequently disturbing misadventures, often involving the paranormal or supernatural.

The 2021 direct-to-DVD film Straight Outta Nowhere: Scooby-Doo! Meets Courage the Cowardly Dog is the only official Courage project in which Dilworth has no involvement.

== Series overview ==
Season	Segments	Episodes	Originally released	
Season	Segments	Episodes	First released	Last released
Pilot			February 18, 1996	
1	26	13	August 21, 1999	July 14, 2000
2	25	13	October 31, 2000	November 16, 2001
3	26	13	January 11, 2002	August 9, 2002
4	25	13	September 6, 2002	November 22, 2002
Special			October 31, 2014	
Crossover film			September 14, 2021	

== Episodes ==
=== Pilot (1996) ===
Title	Written by	Storyboarded by	Original release date
"The Chicken from Outer Space"	John R. Dilworth	John R. Dilworth	February 18, 1996
A cowardly pink dog named Courage tries to stop an alien chicken's plans to invade Earth while on his owners' farm. Nominated for the Academy Award for Best Animated Short Film, this short was featured on Cartoon Network's animation showcase program What a Cartoon! from 1996 to 1997 and shown as a bonus episode at the end of the home video release of Scooby-Doo! and the Witch's Ghost.

=== Season 1 (1999–2000) ===
Note: According to copyright dates and sneak peek of the first episode, (Note: This episode was sneak-previewed on August 21, 1999, during Cartoon Network's Cartoon Cartoon Weekend marathon.) this entire season was completed by October 1999, a month before it premiered.

No. overall	No. in season	Title	Written by	Storyboarded by	Original release date
1a	1a	"A Night at the Katz Motel"	John R. Dilworth and Irvin S. Bauer	John R. Dilworth	November 12, 1999 (Note: This episode was sneak-previewed on August 21, 1999, during Cartoon Network's Cartoon Cartoon Weekend marathon.)
Courage and his owners stop at a lonely motel to end their vacation, but it is owned by a nefarious red cat named Katz, who harbors a penchant for feeding his guests to giant spiders.
1b	1b	"Cajun Granny Stew"	John R. Dilworth and Irvin S. Bauer	John R. Dilworth	December 17, 1999
An orange Cajun fox repeatedly tries to kidnap a sleepy Muriel so he can use her in a Cajun stew.
2a	2a	"The Shadow of Courage"	John R. Dilworth and Irvin S. Bauer	John R. Dilworth	November 19, 1999
A wealthy miser dies alone in his observatory, releasing his playful shadow, who plays tricks and pranks aplenty on the denizens of Nowhere.
2b	2b	"Dr. Le Quack, Amnesia Specialist"	Irvin S. Bauer	Allan Neuwirth	November 19, 1999
While repairing the roof of the farmhouse, Eustace accidentally hits a loose board, which flies down on Muriel, striking her in the head. She ends up suffering from amnesia, and Eustace uses this opportunity to throw Courage out of the house and convince her that she is a "slave woman" that has to do whatever he says. Courage calls in the help of Dr. Le Quack, but realizes too late that the latter is a French duck impersonating a doctor and things escalate further from there.
3a	3a	"Courage Meets Bigfoot"	Irvin S. Bauer	Kevin Brownie	August 21, 1999 (Stealth Premiere); November 26, 1999 (Official Premiere) (Note: This episode was sneak-previewed on August 21, 1999, during Cartoon Network's Cartoon Cartoon Weekend marathon.)
A reward is offered for a Bigfoot's capture, filling Eustace with a greedy bloodlust. Courage, who eventually befriends the creature after at first being terrified, prepares to defend him from his avaricious master.
3b	3b	"Hothead"	David Steven Cohen	David Watchtenheim, Bob Miller and J.P. Dillard	November 26, 1999
Tired of being bald, Eustace obtains an experimental hair tonic advertisement from the newspaper, which Courage finds has an explosive side effect.
4a	4a	"The Demon in the Mattress"	Irvin S. Bauer	Stephen DeStefano	December 3, 1999
Unable to sleep on her old lumpy mattress, Muriel orders a new one. But as soon as it arrives, it is revealed that it apparently harbors an evil spirit, which proceeds to possess her as she sleeps.
4b	4b	"Freaky Fred"	David Steven Cohen and Bill Marsilii	John Flagg and Chad Hicks	December 3, 1999
Muriel's unsettling nephew, Fred, a barber by trade, visits the farmhouse. Courage learns the hard way how much Fred enjoys his profession.
5a	5a	"Night of the Weremole"	David Steven Cohen	Tom Nesbitt and Michael Wetterhahn	November 12, 1999 (Note: This episode was sneak-previewed on August 21, 1999, during Cartoon Network's Cartoon Cartoon Weekend marathon.)
Bitten by a vicious "weremole", Muriel transforms into a similar creature under the light of a full moon. As Courage finds the original monster in hopes of a cure, Eustace faces his deranged wife (whom he has mistaken for mice) with his brittle wit and trusty mallet.
5b	5b	"Mother's Day"	Irvin S. Bauer	David Watchtenheim and Otis Brayboy	December 17, 1999 (Note: This episode was sneak-previewed on August 21, 1999, during Cartoon Network's Cartoon Cartoon Weekend marathon.)
Eustace visits his mother for Mother's Day with Courage. Though Eustace tries to win his mother's love, Ma Bagge would rather dote on Courage, much to Eustace's envy and anger and to Courage's dismay.
6a	6a	"The Duck Brothers"	Craig Shemin	Dave Simons	December 10, 1999
Controlled by a pair of alien duck siblings, Muriel attempts to break into a military compound to rescue the ducks' third brother. Having freed her from their grasp, Courage confronts the aliens and offers them another solution.
6b	6b	"Shirley the Medium"	Craig Shemin	Luc Latulippe, David Watchtenheim, and Michael Wetterhahn	December 10, 1999
A locked box left behind by Eustace's late brother, Horst, defies Eustace's every attempt to open it. Through Shirley the Medium, a Gypsy chihuahua, Eustace contacts his brother for the key, despite Horst's warnings. As the cursed box releases a grabby terror, Courage pleads with the medium for assistance.
7a	7a	"King Ramses' Curse"	Bill Marsilii	Bob Miller, J.P. Dillard, and Brian Clark	January 7, 2000
A pair of "cat burglars" heist a precious, ancient slab, and are confronted with the ghost of its Egyptian owner, King Ramses. Torn from their hands by Ramses' curse, the slab happens upon the farmhouse. When Eustace is greedily unwilling to part with such a valuable treasure as informed by Professor Frith, the Pharaoh's ghost constantly demands "Return the slab" and ravages the farmhouse with a triad of plagues.
7b	7b	"The Clutching Foot"	David Steven Cohen	Curtis Cim	January 7, 2000
A fungus on Eustace's foot gains sentience and consumes him whole, becoming a quintet of old-fashioned mobsters. With his beloved Muriel threatened by the crushing extortion of the infections gangsters, Courage races for a cure.
8a	8a	"The Hunchback of Nowhere"	Irvin S. Bauer	Dave Simons	January 14, 2000
A hideous yet kind-hearted hunchback (voiced by Allen Swift) seeks refuge from the cold, rainy night. Spurned by Eustace, he hides away in the barn, where Courage finds and befriends him. Eustace, jealous of the attention that his family gives the guest, berates and belittles him, until the hunchback shows Eustace what true ugliness is.
8b	8b	"The Gods Must Be Goosey"	David Steven Cohen	Michael Wetterhahn, John Flagg, J.P. Dillard, and Pilar Newton	January 14, 2000
A divine goose falls in love with the portly Muriel. As he beckons her to a paradise above, Courage battles the heavenly gander for his irreplaceable owner.
9a	9a	"Queen of the Black Puddle"	Bill Marsilii	Chad Hicks	January 21, 2000
A single puddle remains eerily behind after a dark rainstorm, hiding a terrible secret. After its quiet queen steals Eustace away, Courage dives into her world to rescue him.
9b	9b	"Everyone Wants to Direct"	Craig Shemin	Antonio Zurera, Luiz de Velasco, Javier Jerez, Jesus Alonso, and Rodrigo Cubillo	January 21, 2000
Dazzled by "famous director" Benton Tarantella's guile and wit, Courage's owners grant the grisly director their basement for his movie. Learning the director's dark intent, the dog scrambles to prevent a ravenous resurrection.
10a	10a	"The Snowman Cometh"	Irvin S. Bauer	David Watchtenheim	January 28, 2000
Faced with an inevitable, melting demise, the last of the Snowmen laments his fate. But when he spies Courage and his owners, inexplicably on vacation in the Arctic, he plots to sap them of their anti-melting gene to stave off his own destruction.
10b	10b	"The Precious, Wonderful, Adorable, Lovable Duckling"	Irvin S. Bauer	Curtis Cim	January 28, 2000
Inadvertently hatched by Eustace, a tiny duckling mistakes him for its mother and quickly grows fiercely protective. The duckling soon becomes jealous of Muriel. Sensing its fatal intentions towards Muriel (while Eustace remains oblivious), Courage battles the duckling for the safety of his owner.
11a	11a	"Heads of Beef"	Irvin S. Bauer	Keith Tucker, Bob Miller, and J.P. Dillard	February 18, 2000
While a sick Muriel stays home on the couch, Eustace takes Courage with him and they go out for hamburgers at a local diner run by a seemingly friendly couple of pigs. Wandering into their basement, however, Courage begins to think that it may not be cow's meat being served there.
11b	11b	"Klub Katz"	David Steven Cohen	Tom Nesbitt and David Watchtenheim	February 18, 2000
Marooned during a cruise, Courage and his owners once again run afoul of Katz. Transformed at his spa into machines designed to fight for Katz's amusement, Muriel places her hope of rescue on Courage.
12a	12a	"The Revenge of the Chicken from Outer Space"	John R. Dilworth and Irvin S. Bauer	John R. Dilworth	June 9, 2000
Now fried and headless, Courage's first nemesis, the alien chicken, returns to Earth for a belated retaliation. It attempts to gain Muriel's head, but gains Eustace's instead and attempts to take Courage down, but fails and ends up being blasted by a rocket ship.
12b	12b	"Journey to the Center of Nowhere"	Craig Shemin	John Flagg and Michael Wetterhahn	June 9, 2000
Angered both by a drought and Muriel's use of eggplants in cooking, a humanized troupe of eggplants plot her downfall deep underground.
13a	13a	"Little Muriel"	David Steven Cohen	Mauro Casalese and Michael Wetterhahn	July 14, 2000
Muriel is sucked into a tornado and returns as a 3½-year-old. Courage must find a way to get her back to her correct age.
13b	13b	"The Great Fusilli"	Irvin S. Bauer	Tom Nesbitt, Eduardo Soriano, David Watchtenheim, and Michael Wetterhahn	July 14, 2000
An alligator named the Great Fusilli arrives at the farmhouse, offering Courage and his owners a chance to perform with him and become rich. As his dark intentions unfold, he turns Muriel and Eustace into puppets. Courage must use Fusilli's own thespian vanity to best him.

=== Season 2 (2000–01) ===
Note 1: All episodes in this season (except episodes 1 and 13, which were written by John R. Dilworth) were written by David Steven Cohen.

Note 2: According to copyright dates, episodes 1 to 9 of this season were completed by November 2000.

No. overall	No. in season	Title	Storyboarded by	Original release date
14a	1a	"The Magic Tree of Nowhere"	David Watchtenheim	October 31, 2000
A wish-granting tree grows by the farmhouse. Envious of all the attention it gets from his family, Eustace decides to chop it down.
14b	1b	"Robot Randy"	Michael Wetterhahn	October 31, 2000
Conforming to his race's whims, a giant robot named Randy reluctantly travels to Earth and enslaves Courage and his owners in order to prove to his people that he is not a failure.
15a	2a	"The Curse of Shirley"	David Watchtenheim	December 8, 2000
As a result of Eustace's cruelty, an angry Shirley lays a rain/thunder cloud curse upon him.
15b	2b	"Courage in the Big Stinkin' City"	David Watchtenheim	December 8, 2000
Courage and his owners go to New York City for Muriel to perform at Radio City Music Hall in Rockefeller Center. A giant cockroach named Schwick (short for "Buschwick") offers to let them stay at his place until the show. Schwick forces Courage to fetch an "evil package" for him, or he will release his deadly pet to devour Muriel.
16a	3a	"Family Business"	Bradley C. Rader	December 29, 2000
A burglar breaks into the farmhouse and attacks Courage and his owners, gaining their complicity against their will. However, he suffers from multiple personality disorder, claims to be a relative, and his attitude towards them changes.
16b	3b	"1,000 Years of Courage"	Eddy Houchins and Dave Simons	December 29, 2000
Due to a meteor impacting the planet, Courage and his owners are hurled a thousand years into a future inhabited by banana people. They follow the banana people to a castle called Bananahalla, where supposedly everyone's question is answered. Unknown to them, the castle is a trap in which a giant gorilla feeds on the unsuspecting banana people entering it. Courage must save his owners and the banana people from the giant gorilla.
17a	4a	"Courage Meets the Mummy"	Mauro Casalese and Alex Leung	January 19, 2001
After being accidentally summoned by archaeologist Professor Frith, the mummy of a Mayan baker seeks revenge for the injustice that was done to him thousands of years earlier. Courage manages to hypnotize his owners to be identified respectively as the historical Mayan princess and poohbah for their personal protection. After the mummy feels satisfied of being innocent from his historical accusation, he decides to go home to his tomb in Chichen Itza. Muriel generously gives him a polka-dotted bed sheet as his new entombment, but it originally belonged to Eustace. Eustace pursues the Mayan mummy and cleverly disguises himself as a mummy inside the Mayan baker's tomb. He angrily shouts at him to return the bed sheet.
17b	4b	"Invisible Muriel"	Jason So	January 19, 2001
Muriel becomes invisible when she wears a magical gem given to her by Courage, unknowingly. When she is soon captured by the government, Courage and Eustace, with the help of Dr. Vindaloo, set out to rescue her.
18a	5a	"Human Habitrail"	John T. Miller	February 16, 2001
A gerbil doctor, pretending to sell vacuums, shrinks Muriel and Eustace, planning on using them for an experiment of his abstract products. Courage sets out to win his owners back.
18b	5b	"Mission to the Sun"	Dave Simons	February 16, 2001
The sun is about to go out, so Courage and his owners go to outer space to fix it. Meanwhile, a tiny space-dwelling creature named Mustafa al Bacterius goes inside Muriel's brain and starts making her go insane so that their mission ends up disastrous. He wants them to fail because he along with all the other aliens see all Earthlings abusing their planets, and that all aliens like the dark.
19a	6a	"Courage the Fly"	Chris Rutkowski	March 16, 2001
Di Lung, a young Chinese American inventor who is experimenting, turns Courage into a fly. Courage soon must figure out how to save the farmhouse while still in fly-form before a giant satellite falls on it.
19b	6b	"Katz Kandy"	Jordan Oliwa and Alex Leung	March 16, 2001
Katz is determined on winning the Nowhere Sweet-Stuff contest and kidnaps Muriel in order to get her secret recipe. Meanwhile, Courage must defeat Katz in a staring contest. It will take a surprising hero to come to both Courage and Muriel's rescue and save the day.
20a	7a	"Nowhere TV"	Jesus Alonso, Javier Jerez, Luis de Velasco, and Antonio Zurera	April 13, 2001
Le Quack hypnotizes Muriel and Eustace through television so they can be transformed into slaves and steal a large amount of lottery money to bring to him.
20b	7b	"Mega Muriel the Magnificent"	Bruce Morris	April 13, 2001
A thunderstorm causes Courage's computer to come to life. It downloads itself into Muriel's body to prove how daring and death-defying it can be.
21a	8a	"Bad Hair Day"	Curtis Cim	May 18, 2001
Dr. Vindaloo is bribed into telling the Growth Industries that Muriel has a rare blood type, ABXYZ. Courage must rescue Muriel from the Growth Industries, a company with a surprising connection to Eustace's mother, Ma Bagge.
21b	8b	"Forbidden Hat of Gold"	Bob Foster	May 18, 2001
Eustace finds Horst's map leading to a hat made of gold. He reluctantly takes Muriel and Courage along, and his greed eventually leads them all into danger.
22a	9a	"Serpent of Evil River"	Mauro Casalese and Alex Leung	June 1, 2001
Courage and his owners are suckered into a free cruise, only to be tricked into assisting the captain in capturing an opera-loving sea serpent named Carmen.
22b	9b	"The Transplant"	Trevor Hierons	June 1, 2001
Courage finds the bones of a giant kangaroo monster. When Eustace attempts to auction them to discoverers, he ends up twisting his spine. Dr. Vindaloo does a disc-transplant on Eustace, causing him to transform into a kangaroo monster himself.
23a	10a	"Car Broke, Phone Yes"	Jesus Alonso, Javier Jerez, Luis de Velasco, and Antonio Zurera	October 26, 2001
A floating alien brain steals Muriel's kindness and takes it back to its master, leaving Courage under two angry owners until he can retrieve it.
23b	10b	"Cowboy Courage"	Dave Simons	October 26, 2001
Courage dreams that he and his owners were in the Old West, with Courage playing the sheriff, Muriel as the bartender, and Eustace as the outlaw.
24a	11a	"Evil Weevil"	David Watchtenheim	November 2, 2001
Eustace accidentally hits a human-sized boll weevil named Jeeves with his truck, and Muriel invites him to spend the night. Unfortunately, Jeeves soon begins sucking Eustace and Muriel's lives away.
24b	11b	"McPhearson Phantom"	Bruce Morris	November 2, 2001
Muriel and Eustace's marriage is tested when they are manipulated into turning against each other by a crafty phantom and an unlikely accomplice, Eustace's mother, Ma.
25a	12a	"The House of Discontent"	Jesus Alonso, Javier Jerez, Luis de Velasco, and Antonio Zurera	November 9, 2001
The spirit of the harvest moon appears one night, demanding that Courage and his owners leave since Eustace cannot seem to grow anything on their land.
25b	12b	"The Sand Whale Strikes" (Note: This episode was dedicated to the memory of Jim P. Dilworth.)	Glenn Lovett	November 9, 2001
A sand whale arrives at the farmhouse and mistakes Eustace for his deceased father, Ickett, demanding the return of his accordion he swindled from him. Eustace tries to explain that his mother, Ma, has it but the sand whale does not believe him. The whale devours Muriel and Eustace and leaves. Courage must convince stubborn old Ma Bagge to return the accordion in order to win Muriel and Eustace back.
26	13	"The Tower of Dr. Zalost" (Note: The name "Zalost" taken from the Croatian word Žalost meaning sorrowfulness.)	David Watchtenheim	November 16, 2001
An extremely depressed and misunderstood professor named Dr. Zalost is incapable of dealing with his sorrowful condition by himself. Overcome by his jealousy of other people's happiness, he lashes out at Nowhere, firing unhappy cannonballs out of his walking tower and plummets the entire town into a state of depression. To gain happiness, he seeks economic elements from the representatives of Nowhere, but when he does not experience relief, he refuses to undo what he has inflicted. With Muriel befalling the effects of the unhappy cannon balls, Courage ventures into the tower of Dr. Zalost to undo the sorrow of Nowhere and the malevolent professor.

=== Season 3 (2002) ===
No. overall	No. in season	Title	Written by	Original release date
27a	1a	"Muriel Meets Her Match"	Katy McLaughlin and David Steven Cohen	January 11, 2002
A pair of married criminals are on the run and they camp next to the farmhouse, with one of them eventually assuming Muriel's identity, which leads to Muriel being framed and arrested. Courage must clear Muriel's name.
27b	1b	"Courage vs. Mecha-Courage"	Jeff Kunkin and Bruce Wilpon	January 11, 2002
Di Lung feels that Courage is not a good enough dog and builds a mechanical version of him as a replacement. Courage decides to stop him by a fight.
28a	2a	"Campsite of Terror"	Craig Shemin and David Steven Cohen	February 8, 2002
Courage and his owners go to a campsite for the weekend. All seems well until Courage and Muriel encounter two orphaned lonely raccoons, who beat Courage up and tie him to a tree before they kidnap Muriel so that she can be their mother while also taking all of Courage's owners' personal belongings in the process. After Courage frees himself and saves Eustace, who was attacked by the raccoons earlier, they begin searching for Muriel, their belongings, and the raccoons. Along the way, they see a poster of a $50,000 reward offer for the raccoons' capture. Courage must choose which side to root for.
28b	2b	"Record Deal"	Susan Kim	February 8, 2002
While spring cleaning, Shirley finds a mystic Velvet Vic record. When she throws it out, Eustace finds it. But when he listens to it, the actual Velvet Vic comes out of the player and traps Muriel in the record. Courage must get help from Shirley who can tell him how to get Muriel out of the record.
29a	3a	"Stormy Weather"	Billy Aronson	March 15, 2002
A storm goddess mistakes Courage for her own dog Duncan and decides to take him, making Muriel furious. However, the goddess's rage causes violent storms to occur. Courage must find Duncan before it is too late.
29b	3b	"The Sandman Sleeps"	David Steven Cohen	March 15, 2002
Muriel develops insomnia after the Sandman steals her sleep. After several failed attempts to get Muriel back to sleep, Courage must find the Sandman in order to get her sleep back.
30a	4a	"Hard Drive Courage"	Susan Kim	June 7, 2002
Courage's computer develops a virus which traps Muriel inside. Courage must go into the digital world to bring her back.
30b	4b	"The Ride of the Valkyries"	Billy Aronson	June 7, 2002
While Courage and his owners are on holiday in Norway, three Valkyries mistake Muriel as their sister and carry her off into the sky where they will fight against the trolls on the next day. Courage sets out to win Muriel back.
31a	5a	"Scuba Scuba Doo"	Lori Lazarus	June 14, 2002
While on a tropical island, Courage and Muriel discover an underwater city made of coral. There, they befriend the citizens. Meanwhile, Eustace informs his mother that there are small creatures living in the coral. She decides that the coral there can make fine wigs and sets off to destroy the coral city and evict the creatures of their coral for her wig factory.
31b	5b	"Conway the Contaminationist"	Craig Shemin	June 14, 2002
A strange elderly man named Conway moves in with Courage and his owners. He changes their lives when he assists them to live in a life of filth, causing a potential bio-hazard.
32a	6a	"Katz Under the Sea"	David Steven Cohen	June 21, 2002
Displeased by Eustace, Muriel takes Courage with her and they go on a submarine vacation. They realize too late that it is being run by one of their old enemies, Katz.
32b	6b	"Curtain of Cruelty"	David Steven Cohen, Mike Samonek and John Reynolds	June 21, 2002
When a strange pink curtain is going through Nowhere making the citizens cruel and mean, Courage finds out that all of this is caused by Professor Mean, who is also cruel and unhappy, and wants everyone else to be cruel and unhappy too.
33a	7a	"Feast of the Bullfrogs"	Lory Lazarus	June 28, 2002
A group of bullfrogs, who have had all the water in their pond dried up, start to invade the farmhouse for water. There, they enslave Courage and his owners, forcing them to act like frogs.
33b	7b	"Tulip's Worm"	David Steven Cohen	June 28, 2002
Two alien teddy bears blast the citizens out of sight when they are looking for a giant worm. Courage discovers the worm outside of the farmhouse, and it reacts whenever he plays a tuba. The space bears come to the scene, and reveal that the little worm is actually a space worm owned by an intergalactic childish human girl named Tulip. As Muriel and the two teddy bears are swallowed by the beast, Courage must take the worm to outer space before Muriel and the bears are digested.
34a	8a	"So in Louvre Are We Two"	Billy Aronson	July 5, 2002
While Courage and his owners are visiting the Louvre, Muriel is convinced that the Mona Lisa looks just like her, and they are like sisters. After the guard is convinced that it looks nothing like Muriel, he locks the museum, expecting everyone to be out. Little does he know that Courage and his owners are trapped inside, and the paintings come to life.
34b	8b	"Night of the Scarecrow"	Susan Kim	July 5, 2002
After leaving a county fair, Courage and his owners get lost through a cornfield and crash into a scarecrow. They take him home where Muriel fixes him up and makes him a mouth so he can talk. He soon becomes depressed when he is not scary enough to frighten away Muriel's attackers, so he decides to train himself to be a much stronger and scarier scarecrow to protect Muriel.
35a	9a	"Mondo Magic"	Craig Shemin	July 12, 2002
Muriel feels she is being watched by someone. Courage discovers a magic kit on the porch. After doing tricks with it, a magician named Mondo comes out and shows off his magic. He is soon discovered to be a hideous creature who traps Eustace in the TV and making Muriel his bride by turning her into the same creature.
35b	9b	"Watch the Birdies"	Allan Neuwirth and Gary Cooper	July 12, 2002
Muriel gets abducted by a giant mother vulture (voiced by Linda Lavin) which tells Muriel to look after its three babies while the mother vulture flies off to find a new mate. The vulture threatens that if her offspring "have a hair out of place" she will eat Muriel "with a cereal spoon". Courage must aid Muriel in keeping the babies safe.
36a	10a	"Fishy Business"	Bruce Wilpon and David Steven Cohen	July 19, 2002
A fish missionary arrives at the farmhouse, believing that Courage and his owners are unfit to live on the land. The fish court forces them to live in a fish bowl with gills.
36b	10b	"Angry Nasty People"	David Steven Cohen	July 19, 2002
Benton Tarantella, the zombie director, returns to convince Courage and his owners to star in his latest sitcom Angry Nasty People.
37a	11a	"Dome of Doom"	Lory Lazarus	July 26, 2002
After a drought, Courage and his owners are unable to grow food. But when they read an advertisement of free food, they order it. However, the plant fruits and vegetables are carnivorous and attempt to eat their new hosts.
37b	11b	"Snowman's Revenge"	Billy Aronson	July 26, 2002
After the North Pole faces heat and everything melts, the snowman creates a mechanical mitten that allows the user to produce snow at will. He moves into the farmhouse and freezes it, causing extreme coldness and distress to Courage and his owners.
38a	12a	"The Quilt Club"	Bill Marsilii	August 2, 2002
Muriel and Courage go to a quilt shop and meet conjoined twin sisters. Muriel wants to be a part of their quilt club, so she goes to an extreme quilt-making test to join them. But Courage smells something fishy.
38b	12b	"Swindlin' Wind"	Billy Aronson	August 2, 2002
Courage and his owners go to Shirley's shop, where Muriel sees a necklace she wants. Eustace gives Shirley an oil deed for the necklace, but she realizes that it's an oil bill. Angry that Eustace ripped her off, Shirley casts a spell on both him and Muriel that causes them to swindle each other. It is now up to Courage to break the spell.
39a	13a	"King of Flan"	David Steven Cohen	August 9, 2002
The King of Flan uses television to hypnotize everyone in Nowhere to eat as much flan as possible. As the citizens of Nowhere become addicted to flan (and become horribly overweight), Courage must stop the King before he leads the city to a path of obesity and doom.
39b	13b	"Courage Under the Volcano"	David Steven Cohen	August 9, 2002
Courage and his owners crash down on an island and are welcomed by a native chief. The citizens dress Muriel in their special native clothing so she can be sacrificed to the Volcano God, who is causing the island to shake. Courage must go inside the volcano and talk to the god before the natives drop Muriel in the volcano.

=== Season 4 (2002) ===
No. overall	No. in season	Title	Written by	Original release date
40a	1a	"A Beaver's Tale"	David Steven Cohen	September 6, 2002
When the local river floods Nowhere, Courage must locate the source of the disaster. When it turns out that a beaver's dam is causing it, Courage helps the beaver follow his dreams rather than build dams.
40b	1b	"The Nutcracker"	Billy Aronson	September 6, 2002
Courage and his owners go to the junkyard to hunt for useful trash, and Courage finds a nutcracker. Two man-eating rats want to feast on Muriel and Eustace. After Eustace is captured, Courage must get Muriel away from the rats.
41a	2a	"Rumpledkiltskin"	Allan Neuwirth and Gary Cooper	September 13, 2002
Muriel's "Uncle Angus" invites her to Scotland, where he imprisons her and demands that she makes thousands of kilts. Courage must learn Angus's real name and free Muriel.
41b	2b	"House Calls"	Lori Lazarus	September 13, 2002
A lonely scientist named Dr. Gerhart wants neighbors, but his sentient house, which is very old and envious, fends them away. He brings the farmhouse next to his house with music, but Gerhart's house intends on destroying the farmhouse out of sheer jealousy and wants Gerhart all to itself. Courage has to find a way to make Gerhart's house happy and save the farmhouse.
42a	3a	"Le Quack Balloon"	David Steven Cohen	September 20, 2002
Le Quack kidnaps Muriel and puts her on a hot air balloon. He teaches her to bungee-jump from the balloon so she can grab a Swedish ingredient for her food, but he is tricking her so he can rob the Swedish national piggy bank instead.
42b	3b	"Windmill Vandals"	Bill Marsilii	September 20, 2002
If the windmill stops turning, the ghosts of terrifying dead vandals will return to attack everyone at the homestead. Courage and Muriel must keep the windmill moving while Eustace tries to fix it.
43a	4a	"The Uncommon Cold"	David Steven Cohen	September 27, 2002
Courage seeks a cure for Muriel's unusual cold among some swamp-slugs enslaved by a snake named Big Bayou from Yoruba mythology. The cure lies in Big Bayou's book, which Courage must steal in order to heal Muriel and free the slugs.
43b	4b	"Farmer-Hunter, Farmer-Hunted"	Billy Aronson	September 27, 2002
Eustace tries to prove that he can hunt like his deceased brother, Horst. But a deer family is tired of being hunted and the father deer decides to hunt Eustace instead. Courage hosts a game show to see who gets to shoot whom.
44a	5a	"Bride of Swamp Monster"	David Steven Cohen	October 4, 2002
Muriel buys a necklace and puts her picture inside, but she loses the pendant in a local swamp. The Swamp Monster finds it and believes Muriel is his long-lost bride. Courage must locate the real bride of the Swamp Monster and reconcile the long-lost lovers in order to get Muriel back.
44b	5b	"Goat Pain"	Lory Lazarus	October 4, 2002
Muriel sprains her back and the only cure is a hot spring on top of Mt. Nowhere. The peak is guarded by a super-powerful goat angry at people for clogging the spring with trash. Courage has to get past the goat and somehow restore the spring.
45a	6a	"Muriel Blows Up"	David Steven Cohen	October 11, 2002
A missile strikes the farm, mutating a carrot in the garden. When Muriel eats it, she begins to grow. Courage must figure out a way to get to the general and disarm the device before time runs out.
45b	6b	"Profiles in Courage"	Bill Marsilii	October 11, 2002
Courage and his owners go to a county fair and have their silhouettes drawn. When the silhouettes come to life later that night and replace Muriel and Eustace, Courage must convince the creatures it is more fun to be paper than people.
46	7	"The Mask"	John R. Dilworth	October 18, 2002
A strange, dog-hating woman named Kitty, wearing a mask and a white robe, appears at the farm. She repeatedly thrashes Courage with various items. Thinking that Kitty is Courage's "new" friend and that the two are "playing", Muriel invites her over to the farmhouse. Kitty explains that her best friend Bunny is being held hostage and treated as a slave by a gangster named Mad Dog, who wants them to be kept apart for good. Courage decides to find Bunny and rescue her from Mad Dog in hopes that Kitty can leave to reunite with Bunny so that he can return to his normal life at home.
47a	8a	"Squatting Tiger, Hidden Dog"	Billy Aronson	October 25, 2002
A Chinese empress wants to grind up Muriel's bones. Courage wants to save Muriel, but he must pass through a series of strange deadly tests first.
47b	8b	"Muted Muriel"	David Steven Cohen	October 25, 2002
Eustace berates Muriel, who has had enough of him for not listening to her, and she decides not to talk ever again. Courage visits Shirley and asks her if she can make Muriel talk again.
48a	9a	"Aqua-Farmer"	Gary Cooper and Allan Neuwirth	October 25, 2002
Unimpressed by Jojo the Dolphin's performance at a local aquarium, Eustace challenges the sea mammal to a race, losing pathetically. He demands a rematch, staking Muriel as the prize of the race.
48b	9b	"Food of the Dragon"	David Steven Cohen	October 25, 2002
A seafood dinner attracts a dragon which has never learned to fly. He is determined to eat Muriel and Eustace unless Courage can teach him to fly.
49a	10a	"Last of the Starmakers"	David Steven Cohen	November 1, 2002
A pregnant space-faring squid who creates stars lands on the farm. Eustace plans to sell her eggs to the military for research. Courage has to save the eggs and the mother squid to keep the heavens twinkling.
49b	10b	"Son of the Chicken from Outer Space"	Michelle Belly Dilworth	November 1, 2002
The three-headed son of Courage's first nemesis shows up, trying to fulfill a vow to kill him, but Courage is far more resourceful than the chicken anticipated.
50a	11a	"Courageous Cure"	David Steven Cohen	November 8, 2002
A race of multi-limbed aliens arrive on Earth, seeking a cure for a virus which causes them to keep punching themselves. They experiment on Muriel and Eustace by letting them grow more hands.
50b	11b	"Ball of Revenge"	Michelle Belly Dilworth	November 8, 2002
Fed up with Muriel's doting on Courage, Eustace invites Katz, Le Quack, the weremole, the Cajun fox, the Giant Foot, and the Puddle Queen to the house to kill Courage in a game of dodgeball.
51a	12a	"Cabaret Courage"	David Steven Cohen	November 15, 2002
Courage and his owners come to "Hollowood". But after falling inside a manhole, they encounter a giant fetus-like being who demands entertainment. He explains to them that if he likes their performances, he will give out glamorous prizes. Courage must find the beast's true self through his heart.
51b	12b	"Wrath of the Librarian"	David Steven Cohen	November 15, 2002
Courage finds a two-year overdue book. When he decides to return it, he does not have enough money for the $10,000 fee. Courage rushes back home to seek the help of his owners. However, he realizes too late that the librarian has deliberately cast a spell on the book, which Muriel and Eustace unknowingly touch, turning them into its characters until Courage finds enough money to pay the fee.
52a	13a	"Remembrance of Courage Past"	Michael Sporn	November 22, 2002
Courage's mysterious past comes to light when his parents were forcibly sent to space by a cruel veterinarian. When Muriel and Eustace notice he is not responding, still haunted by that traumatic event, they take him to the same vet, unaware that the vet is now going to send Courage off to space as well. When Muriel and Eustace discover this, the vet attempts to send them off along with Courage as well to keep them from interfering with his evil space research plans. Courage must prevent history from repeating itself.
52b	13b	"Perfect"	Billy Aronson	November 22, 2002
When Courage cannot do anything correctly, he is approached by the "teacher", who is the manifestation of Courage's own doubts and insecurities that have plagued him. She starts training him strictly into becoming a perfect dog, until Courage learns from the fish in the bathtub that even with his own flaws and imperfections, he can do anything and embraces that he is fine and beautiful the way he is.

=== Special (2014) ===
In February 2012, BuzzFeed reported that a CGI special of Courage the Cowardly Dog was in development. The 7-minute special, titled The Fog of Courage, aired in 2014. Dilworth uploaded the special on his StretchFilms YouTube channel on March 14, 2024, before the video later became privated.

Title	Written by	Storyboarded by	Original release date
"The Fog of Courage"	John R. Dilworth	John R. Dilworth	October 31, 2014

=== Crossover film (2021) ===
In 2021, an 80-minute straight-to-video movie crossing over with Scooby-Doo was released, titled Straight Outta Nowhere: Scooby-Doo! Meets Courage the Cowardly Dog. The film was produced by Warner Bros. Animation and Cartoon Network Studios, but without involvement of Courage creator John R. Dilworth. The movie was released to DVD and digital on September 14, 2021.

Title	Directed by	Written by	Storyboarded by	Original release date
Straight Outta Nowhere: Scooby-Doo! Meets Courage the Cowardly Dog	Cecilia Aranovich	Michael F. Ryan	Aluir Amancio, Richard Gaines, Brandon McKinney, Juan Jose Meza-Leon, Joonki Park & Adam Van Wyk	September 14, 2021
When Mystery Incorporated comes to the middle of Nowhere, Kansas, the backwoods hometown of Courage and his owners Muriel and Eustace Bagge, they find a strange object linked to a giant cicada monster and her wacky winged warriors.
