= List of science fiction television programs, V =

This is an inclusive list of science fiction television programs whose names begin with the letter V.

== V ==
Live-action

- V (franchise):
  - V: The Original Miniseries (1983, miniseries)
  - V: The Final Battle a.k.a. V:TFB (1984, miniseries)
  - V: The Series (1984–1985)
  - V (2009–2011)
- Vagrant Queen (2020)
- Vanishing Man, The (1998, UK) IMDb
- Vägen till Gyllenblå! a.k.a. The Road to Gyllenblå (1985, Sweden, miniseries)
- Vega 4 (1968)
- Vengeance Unlimited (1998)
- Venus on the Hard Drive IMDb
- Veritas: The Quest (2003)
- Viper (1994–1999)
- Virtuality (2009, pilot, film)
- Visitor, The (1997–1998)
- Volta (2008, Philippines)
- Voyage to the Bottom of the Sea (1964–1968)
- Voyagers! (1982–1983)
- VR Troopers (1994–1996)
- VR.5 (1995)

Animated

- Valley of the Dinosaurs (1974–1976, animated)
- Valvrave the Liberator (2012–2013, Japan, animated)
- Vandread (franchise):
  - Vandread (2000, Japan, animated)
  - Vandread: The Second stage (2001, Japan, animated)
- Venture Bros., The (2004-2018)
- Video Warrior Laserion (1984–1985, Japan, animated)
- Viper's Creed (1999, Japan, animated)
- Virus Attack (2011–2012, Italy, animated) Mondo TV (Italy): Virus Attack Cartoon Network (Italy): Virus Attack IMDb
- Virus Buster Serge (1997, Japan, animated)
- Visionaries: Knights of the Magical Light (1987, animated)
- Voltron (franchise):
  - Voltron a.k.a. Voltron: Defender of the Universe (1984–1985, Japan, animated)
  - Voltron: Fleet of Doom (1986, Japan/US, special, film, animated)
  - Voltron: The Third Dimension (1998–2000, animated)
  - Voltron Force (2011–2012, animated)
  - Voltron: Legendary Defender (2016–2018, animated)
  - Armored Fleet Dairugger XV a.k.a. Dairugger 15 a.k.a. Dairugger XV a.k.a. Armored Armada Dairugger XV a.k.a. Armored Squadron Dairugger XV a.k.a. Machine Platoon Dairugger (1982–1983, Japan, animated, footage used in Voltron: Fleet of Doom)
  - Beast King GoLion a.k.a. GoLion a.k.a. King of the Beasts GoLion (1981–1982, Japan, animated, footage used in Voltron: Fleet of Doom)*Voodoo Factor, The (1959) IMDb
