= Voltron (disambiguation) =

Voltron is an animated television franchise.

Notable elements of the franchise include:

- Beast King GoLion, the original Japanese version of the aforementioned show's first season
- Armored Fleet Dairugger XV, the original Japanese version of the second season
- Voltron (1984 TV series), a 1980s anime television show
- Voltron: Fleet of Doom, a 1986 television movie
- Voltron: The Third Dimension, a 1998 television continuation of the 1980s show
- Voltron Force, a 2010 update of the original 1980s show
- Voltron: Legendary Defender, a 2016 Netflix exclusive series
- Voltron (film), an upcoming live action movie based on the anime series

Voltron may also refer to:

- Voltron Nevera, a roller coaster at Europa Park in Rust, Germany
- Members of a family of genetically encoded voltage indicators, used in neurobiology
