= List of Voltron episodes =

The following is an episode list for the television series Voltron, an English language combination of the two unrelated Japanese series Beast King GoLion, and Armored Fleet Dairugger XV. The Voltron franchise, in total, has 200 episodes and one television special.

The original series began its run in 1984, airing 124 episodes, plus the one-hour Fleet of Doom special. In 1998, a new CGI-series entitled Voltron: The Third Dimension premiered, consisting of two seasons and 26 episodes. In 2011, Voltron Force premiered on Nicktoons, with one season and 26 episodes. In 2016, Voltron: Legendary Defender premiered on Netflix, consisting of eight seasons and 78 episodes.

== Lion Force Voltron ==
=== Part 1 (1984) ===
Based on Beast King GoLion.

No.	Title	Original release date
1	"Space Explorers Captured"	September 10, 1984
2	"Escape to Another Planet"	September 11, 1984
3	"A Ghost And Four Keys"	September 12, 1984
4	"The Missing Key"	September 13, 1984
5	"The Princess Joins Up"	September 14, 1984
6	"The Right Arm of Voltron"	September 17, 1984
7	"The Lion Has New Claws"	September 18, 1984
8	"The Stolen Lion"	September 26, 1984
9	"A Pretty Spy"	September 27, 1984
10	"Secret of the White Lion"	September 28, 1984
11	"Surrender"	October 1, 1984
12	"Bad Birthday Party"	October 8, 1984
13	"The Witch Gets a Face Lift"	October 12, 1984
14	"Yurak Gets His Pink Slip"	October 2, 1984
15	"Give Me Your Princess"	October 3, 1984
16	"Bridge Over the River Chozzerai"	October 4, 1984
17	"My Brother Is A Robeast"	November 19, 1984
18	"Zarkon Is Dying"	October 5, 1984
19	"The Buried Castle"	October 16, 1984
20	"Pidge's Home Planet"	October 25, 1984
21	"It'll Be a Cold Day"	November 21, 1984
22	"The Deadly Flowers"	October 9, 1984
23	"It Takes Real Lions"	October 17, 1984
24	"Raid of the Alien Mice"	October 10, 1984
25	"Short Run of the Centipede Express"	October 11, 1984
26	"The Invisible Robeast"	October 26, 1984
27	"The Green Medusa"	October 15, 1984
28	"The Treasure of Planet Tyrus"	October 30, 1984
29	"Magnetic Attraction"	November 6, 1984
30	"The Sleeping Princess"	October 18, 1984
31	"The Sincerest Form of Flattery"	October 31, 1984
32	"A Transplant for the Blue Lion"	November 15, 1984
33	"Attack of the Fierce Frogs"	November 8, 1984
34	"Lotor Traps Pidge"	October 19, 1984
35	"Doom Boycotts the Space Olympics"	October 29, 1984
36	"Lotor's Clone"	November 7, 1984
37	"Lotor's New Hitman"	November 14, 1984
38	"Raid of the Red Berets"	November 16, 1984
39	"The Captive Comet"	October 22, 1984
40	"The Little Prince"	October 23, 1984
41	"There Will Be A Royal Wedding"	October 24, 1984
42	"The Sand People"	November 5, 1984
43	"Voltron Frees the Slaves"	November 12, 1984
44	"Voltron vs. Voltron"	November 9, 1984
45	"One Princess To Another"	November 20, 1984
46	"The Mighty Space Mouse"	November 13, 1984
47	"Summit Meeting"	November 22, 1984
48	"Return of Coran's Son"	November 1, 1984
49	"Coran's Son Runs Amuck"	November 2, 1984
50	"Zarkon Becomes a Robeast"	November 23, 1984
51	"Lotor the King"	November 26, 1984
52	"Final Victory"	November 27, 1984

=== Part 2 (1985) ===
Original American-created episodes, starring Lion Force Voltron.

No.	Title	Original release date
53	"Dinner and a Show"	October 21, 1985
54	"Envoy from Galaxy Garrison"	October 22, 1985
55	"Mousemania"	October 23, 1985
56	"The Shell Game"	October 24, 1985
57	"The Traitor"	October 25, 1985
58	"Voltron Meets Jungle Woman"	October 28, 1985
59	"Little Buddies"	October 29, 1985
60	"Who Was That Masked Man?"	October 30, 1985
61	"Take a Robot to Lunch"	November 1, 1985
62	"War and Peace... And Doom!"	November 4, 1985
63	"Who's Flyin' Blue Lion?"	November 5, 1985
64	"Enter Merla: Queen of Darkness"	November 6, 1985
65	"A Ghost of a Chance"	November 7, 1985
66	"To Soothe the Savage Robeast"	November 8, 1985
67	"Doom Girls on the Prowl"	November 11, 1985
68	"With Friends Like You"	November 12, 1985
69	"Lotor – My Hero?"	November 13, 1985
70	"No Muse Is Good Muse"	November 14, 1985
71	"The Alliance Strikes Back!"	November 15, 1985
72	"Breakin' up Is Hard to Doom"	November 18, 1985

== Vehicle Team Voltron (1984–1985) ==
Based on Armored Fleet Dairugger XV.

No.	Title	Original release date
73	"In Search of New Worlds"	19 October 1984
74	"First Day on a New World"	27 October 1984
75	"Building a New World"	3 November 1984
76	"Goodbye, New World"	10 November 1984
77	"Try This World for Size"	17 November 1984
78	"A Storm of Meteors"	20 September 1984
79	"Help Not Wanted"	29 September 1984
80	"Ghost Fleet from Another Planet"	7 October 1984
81	"A Very Short Vacation"	14 January 1985
82	"Planet of the Bats"	21 September 1984
83	"A Temporary Truce"	14 December 1984
84	"Wolo's Lost World"	17 December 1984
85	"Planet Stop for Repairs"	24 December 1984
86	"A Curious Comet"	25 December 1984
87	"In the Enemy Camp"	5 March 1985
88	"Who's on First"	18 December 1984
89	"No, Who's on Second"	15 January 1985
90	"What's on First"	16 January 1985
91	"Great Stone Space Faces"	17 January 1985
92	"Defend the New World"	19 December 1984
93	"Meanwhile, Back at Galaxy Garrison"	28 December 1984
94	"Nerok Scores Big"	18 January 1985
95	"Hazar on the Carpet"	20 December 1984
96	"Hazar is Demoted"	26 December 1984
97	"Just Like Earth"	7 January 1985
98	"The Planet Trap"	31 December 1984
99	"Save the Space Station"	1 February 1985
100	"Planet of the Amazons"	2 January 1985
101	"Revolt of the Slaves"	11 January 1985
102	"Raid on Galaxy Garrison"	21 January 1985
103	"Smashing the Meteor Barrier"	1 January 1985
104	"A Man Made Sun"	3 January 1985
105	"Captain Newley Returns"	27 December 1984
106	"Hazar Bucks the Empire"	24 January 1985
107	"Letters from Home"	21 December 1984
108	"Peace – A Fish Story!"	25 January 1985
109	"The Red Moon People"	8 January 1985
110	"This World's for the Birds"	9 January 1985
111	"That's the Old Ball Game"	4 February 1985
112	"Red Moon Rises Again"	31 January 1985
113	"Another Solar System"	31 January 1985
114	"Whose World Is It"	30 January 1985
115	"It's Anybody's World"	5 February 1985
116	"Frozen Assets"	6 February 1985
117	"Coconuts"	7 February 1985
118	"It Could Be a Long War"	8 February 1985
119	"Color Me Invisible"	11 February 1985
120	"Time Running Out"	12 February 1985
121	"Zero Hour Approaches"	13 February 1985
122	"The Drules' World Cracks Up"	14 February 1985
123	"The Drule's Surrender"	15 February 1985
124	"The End of Hazar's World"	18 February 1985
