= Voltron (comics) =

Comic book series

Publication information
- Publisher: Modern Comics; Devil's Due; Dynamite Entertainment
- Schedule: Monthly
- Format: Ongoing series
- Genre: Science fiction
- Main characters: Voltron Characters

Voltron is the name of two past comic book series and one current series published by different companies. Both previous series are based on the television series Voltron. Voltron is the name of the robot that the main characters pilot to fight evil in space. The series stars five young soldiers who are recruited to find the title character in deep space, and to use Voltron to defend the galaxy.

== Modern Comics ==
In 1985, Modern Comics (an imprint of Charlton Comics) produced a three-issue limited series based on the Lion Voltron television show.

== Devils' Due ==
In 2002, comic book publisher Devil's Due announced it had acquired the rights to publish Voltron comic books. Devil's Due, through Image Comics, published a five issue mini-series (preceded by a #0 issue from Dreamwave) which featured the Lion Voltron incarnation of the character and rebooted the property. This was then followed by an ongoing series self-published by Devil's Due, which was placed on hiatus in 2005 after the eleventh issue, due to poor sales.

Devil's Due announced in January 2008 that the five-issue mini-series, the eleven issues of the ongoing series, and the #0 issue would be collected into a Voltron Omnibus trade paperback that would also include the unpublished twelfth issue of the ongoing series that would wrap up all the storylines.

In July 2008, a new five issue mini-series was released by Devil's Due, which picked up where the ongoing series left off. This series further explored the origins of Lion Voltron's creation, from 12,000 years in the past to the present day. The mini-series showed Voltron existing as a single construct created by sorcerers and scientists, resembling a knight. During its battle with the first Drule Empire, Voltron was tricked by Haggar into landing on a black comet with the gravitational attraction of a singularity. Voltron was then attacked by Haggar, and blown into five pieces. However, the intervention of a sorcerer resulted in the five pieces becoming the five lions as they descended onto Arus.

The original five issue mini-series was adapted as the 2007 motion comic Voltron: Defenders of the Universe - REVELATIONS. Its sequel, Voltron: Defenders of the Universe - PARADISE LOST, adapted the first storyarc of the ongoing series, introducing the V-15 and its pilots.

== Dynamite ==
In 2011, comic book publisher Dynamite Entertainment announced it had acquired the rights to publish Voltron comic books through parent company Dynamic Forces. Dynamite released the Voltron comic series in December 2011 and it lasted 12 issues until May 2013. They also released a 6-issue series called Voltron: Year One in 2012 and 6-issue series called Voltron: From the Ashes in 2015-16.
