= Voltron =

American science fiction franchise

- Created by: World Events Productions
- Original work: Beast King GoLion and Armored Fleet Dairugger XV
- Owner: World Events Productions

Print publications
- Comics: Voltron; Voltron: Legendary Defender

Films and television
- Animated series: Voltron (1984–1985); Voltron: The Third Dimension (1998–2000); Voltron Force (2011–2012); Voltron: Legendary Defender (2016–2018)
- Television special: Voltron: Fleet of Doom (1986)

Voltron is a Japanese media franchise that features a team of space explorers who pilot a giant super robot known as "Voltron". This super robot was created when needed by smaller robots joining together, with the process of that unification varying over time. Produced by Peter Keefe (executive producer) and Ted Koplar through his production company World Events Productions, Voltron was an English- dubbed version of several Japanese anime television series from Toei Company. The original television series aired in syndication from September 10, 1984, to November 18, 1985. The first season of Voltron, featuring the "Lion Force Voltron", was a dubbed version of the series Beast King GoLion. The second season, featuring the "Vehicle Team Voltron", was a dubbed version of the unrelated series Armored Fleet Dairugger XV.

Voltron: Defender of the Universe was the top-rated syndicated children's show for two years during its original run, and it spawned three follow-up series, several comic books, and a line of toys.

== Television series ==
Series	Season	Episodes	Originally released		
Series	Season	Episodes	First released	Last released	Network
Lion Force Voltron	1	52	September 10, 1984	November 27, 1984	Broadcast syndication
Lion Force Voltron	2	20	October 21, 1985	November 18, 1985	Broadcast syndication
Vehicle Team Voltron	1	52	December 14, 1984	February 18, 1985	Broadcast syndication
Voltron: Fleet of Doom	1	1	September 10, 1986		Broadcast syndication
Voltron: The Third Dimension	1	17	September 12, 1998	May 22, 1999	Broadcast syndication
Voltron: The Third Dimension	2	9	October 9, 1999	February 19, 2000	Broadcast syndication
Voltron Force	1	26	June 16, 2011	April 25, 2012	Nicktoons
Voltron: Legendary Defender	1	13	June 10, 2016		Netflix
Voltron: Legendary Defender	2	13	January 20, 2017		Netflix
Voltron: Legendary Defender	3	7	August 4, 2017		Netflix
Voltron: Legendary Defender	4	6	October 13, 2017		Netflix
Voltron: Legendary Defender	5	6	March 2, 2018		Netflix
Voltron: Legendary Defender	6	7	June 15, 2018		Netflix
Voltron: Legendary Defender	7	13	August 10, 2018		Netflix
Voltron: Legendary Defender	8	13	December 14, 2018		Netflix

=== Lion Force Voltron ("Voltron of the Far Universe"; Voltron III) ===
The first series was primarily edited from Beast King GoLion (Hyakujū-ō Goraion), and it features a team of five young pilots commanding five robot lions which can be combined to form Voltron. In this undefined future era, the Voltron Force is in charge of protecting the planet Arus (ruled by Princess Allura) from the evil King Zarkon (from planet Doom), his son Lotor, and the witch Haggar, who creates huge "ro-beasts" to terrorize the Arusian people. Despite being the first of the two robots to appear on American television, the "GoLion" version of Voltron was regarded as "Voltron III" within the storyline because, within the original planned three-Voltron continuity, Arus was the furthest setting from Earth's side of the universe ("Voltron I" being intended for the Near Universe, and "Voltron II" being intended for the Middle Universe).

=== Vehicle Team Voltron ("Voltron of the Near Universe"; Voltron I) ===
The second series, colloquially dubbed "Car Voltron", was primarily edited from Armored Fleet Dairugger XV (Kikō Kantai Dairugger XV), with the storyline considerably changed. In this iteration of Voltron, the Galaxy Alliance's home planets are now overcrowded, and a fleet of explorers is sent to search for new planets to colonize. Along the way, they attract the attention of the evil Drule Empire, long engaged in an ongoing war against the Alliance, and the Drule proceed to interfere with the mission of the explorers and the colonists. Since the Arusian Voltron is too far away to help these explorers, a totally new Voltron has to be constructed to battle the Drule threat.

This Voltron Force consists of fifteen members, divided into three teams of five, known respectively as the Land, Sea, and Air Teams. Each team is specialized in gathering data or fighting in their area of expertise. Each team can combine their vehicles into a bigger machine. When necessary, all fifteen vehicles combine to form the mighty Voltron. However, the Vehicle Team Voltron only had enough stored energy to operate for five minutes at a time.

In the toy line, this Voltron was referred to as Voltron I because it was set closest to Earth.

=== Gladiator Voltron ("Voltron of the Middle Universe"; Voltron II) ===
The proposed third season was to have been based on Lightspeed Electroid Albegas (Kōsoku Denjin Albegas). The series would have centered around three teenage geniuses who each created a humanoid robot that were then modified for battle to combat an alien threat. Unlike the Lion Force Voltron or the Vehicle Force Voltron, both of whom were composed of machines that combined to form them, Gladiator Voltron's three components actually disassembled and reassembled into one large robot. This allowed for multiple different combinations with different functions and skills depending on the situation. There were also three jets that the team members would fly into hatches on the backs of their robots to pilot them that could also combine into one large jet, which were later replaced with other jets that could transform into smaller bipedal robots and could also combine to form a larger robot. Although Matchbox did produce and market toy versions of the three robots (Black Alpha, Blue Beta, Red Gamma) under the "Voltron II" name, the series never actually aired. Due to the extreme popularity of the Lion Force Voltron and the lack of popularity of the Vehicle Team Voltron series, World Events Productions eventually elected against another alternate Voltron, and plans to adapt Albegas were aborted.

=== Voltron: Fleet of Doom (1986) ===
In 1986, World Events hired Toei Animation to produce the one-off crossover television special Voltron: Fleet of Doom, which mixed in GoLion and Dairugger XV footage with new animation. The special was made for the international market and, as of the middle of September 2016, it had not been released in Japan.

=== Voltron: The Third Dimension (1998–2000) ===
The computer-generated series Voltron: The Third Dimension was released in 1998, set five years after the end of the original Lion Voltron series. The series was met with a mixed response, due to various changes, such as the revamped looks of the Lion Voltron, King Zarkon, and Prince Lotor. The series served as a sequel to the Lion Force Voltron series; among the tools used to bridge the gap between the two series was an official starmap as designed by Shannon Muir and finalized in partnership with World Events Productions. After Voltron: The Third Dimension, World Events Productions went back to the drawing board to develop a more traditionally animated series in an attempt to recapture the spirit of the original.

=== Voltron Force (2011–2012) ===
The animated series Voltron Force premiered on Nicktoons in June 2011. The series follows the exploits of a group of three young cadets brought together by the original members of the Voltron Force to defend the galaxy against a resurrected Lotor, now ruling the planet Drule after a military coup d'état. Voltron Force is a World Events Production in conjunction with Kick Start Productions and Classic Media.

=== Voltron: Legendary Defender (2016–2018) ===
The Netflix-exclusive series Voltron: Legendary Defender, produced by DreamWorks Animation, is a reboot of the Voltron story. The series premiered on June 10, 2016, with Joaquim Dos Santos and Lauren Montgomery serving as showrunners. On January 5, 2016, Netflix announced that Voltron would debut in 2016 as an original animated Netflix series in partnership with DreamWorks Animation (DWA), part of an expanded multi-year agreement between the two groups. In February, teasers revealed the title of the new series to be Voltron: Legendary Defender. On March 25, 2016, a teaser trailer was released, announcing that the first season, consisting of 13 episodes, would premiere June 10, 2016. A second season premiered on Netflix on January 20, 2017. The third season premiered on Netflix on August 4, 2017, and consisted of 7 episodes while the fourth season premiered on October 13, 2017, and consisted of 6 episodes. The fifth season premiered on March 2, 2018, and consists of six episodes. The sixth season premiered on June 15, 2018, and consists of seven episodes. The seventh season premiered August 10, 2018, and consists of 13 episodes. The eighth and final season premiered on December 14, 2018, and consists of 13 episodes. The series' success has spawned several comics, action figures, and other toys.

== Live-action film ==
In July 2005, producer Mark Gordon (Grey's Anatomy, The League of Extraordinary Gentlemen) announced plans to create a live-action film adaptation of the Voltron franchise in collaboration with producers Pharrell Williams, Mark Costa, and Frank Oelman. Pharrell Williams was also reported to compose the musical score for the film. The project's development was funded by Jim Young's Animus Films. In December 2006, screenwriter Enzo Marra was announced to have completed a script for Gordon. In August 2007, the production entity New Regency entered negotiations with The Mark Gordon Company to adapt Voltron. Interest in the property heightened after the box office success of Transformers, another film involving shape-changing robots. Mark's script was described as "a post-apocalyptic tale set in New York City...[in which] five ragtag survivors of an alien attack band together and end up piloting the five lion-shaped robots that combine and form the massive sword-wielding Voltron that helps battle Earth's invaders." On August 18, 2008, Relativity Media entered negotiations with New Regency to finance and produce the film, though on a more moderate budget, utilizing cost-saving CGI techniques such as those used in 300. Max Makowski was slated to direct. As of the end of August 2008, the title had been set for Voltron: Defender of the Universe. Relativity would have released the film in North America while New Regency's distribution partner, 20th Century Fox, would handle international distribution. But at that time, Ted Koplar, through his World Events Production Company (Koplar took over the company as the health of Peter Keefe declined; Keefe died in 2010 at age 57), was fighting a legal battle with Toei Company Ltd. over the movie rights as of November of that year. On September 16, 2010, concept art for the movie was released. On March 8, 2011, it was announced that Relativity Media and World Events had entered a bidding war on who would make the film. Thomas Dean Donnelly and Joshua Oppenheimer entered into collaboration on writing the script. On July 21, 2011, Atlas Entertainment & Relativity Media announced they would bring Voltron: Defender of the Universe to the big screen. Relativity Media would distribute. On July 30, 2015, Relativity filed for Chapter 11 bankruptcy in the United States Bankruptcy Court for the Southern District of New York after lawsuits and missing loan payments, and the film rights reverted to Classic Media. On November 4, 2016, three months after the completion of NBCUniversal's acquisition of Classic Media's parent company, DreamWorks Animation for $3.8 billion, it was announced that Universal Pictures and DreamWorks Animation will make the film with David Hayter writing the script.

In March 2022, it was announced that the live-action film was officially back in development with Rawson Marshall Thurber directing and co-writing the screenplay with Ellen Shanman, and produced by Todd Lieberman, David Hoberman, and Bob Koplar. The film also incited a bidding war between Warner Bros. Pictures, Universal Pictures, and Amazon Prime Video. Amazon is leading the bid. On August 1, it was confirmed that Amazon had acquired the rights. On October 3, newcomer Daniel Quinn-Toye was cast in a lead role. On October 10, it was reported that Henry Cavill would be joining the live action cast in an undisclosed role. On November 25, 2024, it was reported that Sterling K. Brown, Rita Ora and John Kim were cast in undisclosed roles. The next day, Alba Baptista, Samson Kayo and Tharanya Tharan were announced in undisclosed roles. It was announced that filming on the movie had begun.

== Characters ==
Character	Voltron		Voltron: Fleet of Doom	Voltron: The Third Dimension		Voltron Force	Voltron: Legendary Defender							
Character	Lion Force Voltron	Vehicle Team Voltron	Voltron: Fleet of Doom	1	2	Voltron Force	1	2	3	4	5	6	7	8
Character	1984	1985	1984–85	1986	1998–99	1999–2000	2011–12	2016	2017			2018		
Keith	Neil Ross	Neil Ross	Neil Ross	Neil Ross	Neil Ross	Giles Panton	Steven Yeun	Steven Yeun	Steven Yeun	Steven Yeun	Steven Yeun	Steven Yeun	Steven Yeun	Steven Yeun
Pidge	Neil Ross	Neil Ross	Neil Ross	Billy West	Billy West	Sam Vincent	Bex Taylor-Klaus	Bex Taylor-Klaus	Bex Taylor-Klaus	Bex Taylor-Klaus	Bex Taylor-Klaus	Bex Taylor-Klaus	Bex Taylor-Klaus	Bex Taylor-Klaus
Honerva / Haggar	B. J. Ward	B. J. Ward	B. J. Ward	B. J. Ward	B. J. Ward	Vincent Tong	Lily Rabe and Cree Summer	Lily Rabe and Cree Summer	Lily Rabe and Cree Summer	Lily Rabe and Cree Summer	Lily Rabe and Cree Summer	Lily Rabe and Cree Summer	Lily Rabe and Cree Summer	Lily Rabe and Cree Summer
Emperor Zarkon	Jack Angel	Jack Angel	Jack Angel	Kevin Michael Richardson	Kevin Michael Richardson		Neil Kaplan and Kevin Durand	Neil Kaplan and Kevin Durand	Neil Kaplan and Kevin Durand	Neil Kaplan and Kevin Durand	Neil Kaplan and Kevin Durand	Neil Kaplan and Kevin Durand	Neil Kaplan and Kevin Durand	Neil Kaplan and Kevin Durand
Commander Yurak	Jack Angel	Jack Angel	Jack Angel				Jake Eberle	Jake Eberle	Jake Eberle	Jake Eberle	Jake Eberle	Jake Eberle	Jake Eberle	Jake Eberle
Lance	Michael Bell		Michael Bell	Michael Bell	Michael Bell	Andrew Francis	Jeremy Shada	Jeremy Shada	Jeremy Shada	Jeremy Shada	Jeremy Shada	Jeremy Shada	Jeremy Shada	Jeremy Shada
Coran	Peter Cullen		Michael Bell	Michael Bell	Michael Bell	Ron Halder	Rhys Darby	Rhys Darby	Rhys Darby	Rhys Darby	Rhys Darby	Rhys Darby	Rhys Darby	Rhys Darby
Princess Allura	B. J. Ward		B. J. Ward	B. J. Ward	B. J. Ward	Ashleigh Ball	Kimberly Brooks	Kimberly Brooks	Kimberly Brooks	Kimberly Brooks	Kimberly Brooks	Kimberly Brooks	Kimberly Brooks	Kimberly Brooks
Hunk	Lennie Weinrib		Lennie Weinrib	Kevin Michael Richardson	Kevin Michael Richardson	Ty Olsson	Tyler Labine	Tyler Labine	Tyler Labine	Tyler Labine	Tyler Labine	Tyler Labine	Tyler Labine	Tyler Labine
Prince Lotor	Lennie Weinrib		Lennie Weinrib	Tim Curry	Tim Curry	Mark Hildreth		Mentioned	A.J. LoCascio	A.J. LoCascio	A.J. LoCascio	A.J. LoCascio	A.J. LoCascio	A.J. LoCascio
King Alfor	Peter Cullen			Tim Curry	Tim Curry	Sam Vincent	Keith Ferguson	Keith Ferguson	Keith Ferguson	Keith Ferguson	Keith Ferguson	Keith Ferguson	Keith Ferguson	Keith Ferguson
Sven / Shiro	Michael Bell					Alan Marriott	Josh Keaton	Josh Keaton	Josh Keaton	Josh Keaton	Josh Keaton	Josh Keaton	Josh Keaton	Josh Keaton
Chip	Neil Ross	Neil Ross	Neil Ross			Gabe Khouth								Pictured
Queen Merla	Tress MacNeille											Adelaide Clemens	Adelaide Clemens	Adelaide Clemens

Note: A gray cell indicates the character did not appear in that medium.

== DVD releases ==
In Australia, DVDs of all episodes of Voltron were released by Madman Entertainment as the 20th Anniversary Edition, Lion Force Voltron Collection. The original series was released in five volumes between August 2004 and July 2005, under the name Voltron: Defender of the Universe. Each box was in the color and style of one of the lions with a metallic glossy inner DVD-case. Another three volumes of "Vehicle Team Voltron" were released between August and December 2005. In addition, a "Best of" 2-DVD set released in November 2006 featured five episodes from each series. Finally, a 24-disc boxset subtitled The Lion and Vehicle Force Complete Collection was released on June 24, 2009. Madman Entertainment has since relinquished the rights to the Voltron series and has since been re-released by Beyond Home Entertainment. Previous licensees of Voltron in Australia have been CBS/Fox Video and Manga Entertainment.

Prior to the release of the boxed sets, a promotional DVD was released for Voltron. It was packed in a threefold glossy cardboard folder. The folder featured full-color artwork and text about the then-upcoming release of Voltron on DVD. The disk had an image of Voltron, and was labeled for promotional use only. It featured the first episode, "Space Explorers Captured", and several promos for other series.

In Region 1, Voltron was released on DVD in its original broadcast form and remastered, restored, and remixed by New York-based distributor Media Blasters (via their AnimeWorks unit) in eight volumes between September 2006 and July 2009. The volumes contain approximately fifteen episodes each, along with special features such as interviews with producer and director Franklin Cofod, and various others involved in the original and current productions. The first five volumes together contain all the Lion Force episodes, which were broadcast as seasons 1 and 3, while the next three contain the Vehicle Team episodes, broadcast as season 2.

The Fleet of Doom special was released on DVD early in 2007, as an online Voltron.com exclusive. Media Blasters released Fleet of Doom on July 28, 2009, as a full retail release. A Blu-ray version was planned, but it was delayed many times and was finally officially canceled.

The first volume of the original series was released in the UK in 2007 by Manga Entertainment.

According to TVShowsOnDVD.com, Voltron: The Third Dimension was to be released on DVD at some point, but no release date has been announced currently.

Media Blasters/AnimeWorks also released the two Japanese shows that made up Voltron — Beast King GoLion and Armored Fleet Dairugger XV — each in their original, unedited Japanese form, with English subtitles. Volume 1 of GoLion was released on May 27, 2008, Volume 2 on August 12, 2008, and Volume 3 on November 25, 2008. GoLion was re-released as a complete chronology set with all 52 episodes on April 13, 2010. The first Dairugger XV DVD collection was released on February 23, 2010, the second Dairugger XV collection was released on May 25, 2010. The third and final collection was originally scheduled to be released in September 2010, but was repeatedly delayed and finally released on January 4, 2011.

As of mid-2011, Classic Media (DreamWorks Classics) now owns the rights to Voltron on DVD.

On September 24, 2019, Universal Pictures Home Entertainment released Voltron: Defender of the Universe: The Complete Collection on DVD in Region 1, which includes all 124 episodes and Fleet of Doom. The series is also scheduled for DVD releases in the UK, France, Italy, Spain, and Germany.

== Digital releases ==
As of July 2011 all Lion Force episodes have been released on Hulu. Minisodes of the first twenty episodes of the first season can be streamed for free online on Crackle.

Following the success of Voltron: Legendary Defender, Netflix released 12 episodes of Defender of the Universe as Voltron '84 on March 24, 2017. Each episode is introduced by members of the cast and crew of Legendary Defender.

Release	Australia (Region 4)		North America (Region 1)	
Lion Force Voltron Collection 1	September 22, 2004	Black Lion	September 26, 2006	Blue Lion
Lion Force Voltron Collection 2	November 19, 2004	Red Lion	December 19, 2006	Yellow Lion
Lion Force Voltron Collection 3	February 23, 2005	Green Lion	May 8, 2007	Green Lion
Lion Force Voltron Collection 4	April 13, 2005	Blue Lion	September 25, 2007	Red Lion
Lion Force Voltron Collection 5	July 20, 2005	Yellow Lion	December 11, 2007	Black Lion
Vehicle Force Voltron Collection 1	August 31, 2005	Air Team	December 23, 2008	Air Team
Vehicle Force Voltron Collection 2	October 19, 2005	Land Team	March 24, 2009	Land Team
Vehicle Force Voltron Collection 3	December 7, 2005	Sea Team	July 21, 2009	Sea Team
Fleet of Doom	Unreleased	Unreleased	July 28, 2009	Team-Up

=== Soundtracks ===
The Voltron television franchise has produced soundtracks for three of its series which have been released exclusively on the iTunes and the Google Play stores. The first soundtrack release was on September 27, 2012, for the original Lions series with music composed by John Petersen. The second soundtrack release was on October 1, 2012, for the Third Dimension series with music composed by Stephen Martson and the third release on July 21, 2016, for the first season of the Legendary Defender series with music composed by Brad Breeck, Brian Parkhurst, and Alex Geringas. Currently, there are no plans to release any of the soundtrack to a non-digital version such as a physical album or CD.

Voltron: Defender of the Universe Track Listings			
Track No.	Song title	Run Time	Note
01	Voltron Opener (Narration)	1:17	Narration by Peter Cullen who also provided voices in the Lions series
02	Descent	1:11	
03	Mystical	0:28	
04	Alien Landscape	0:41	
05	A Witch	1:05	
06	Gladiator Fight	1:06	
07	Arrival	0:30	
08	Sneaking	0:38	
09	Bad Guys	0:27	
10	Royal Subjects	0:42	
11	Dangerous	0:36	
12	Bumper #1	0:08	First of three bumpers to transition to a commercial break.
13	Voltron Will Be Back...	0:08	Used for commercial breaks. Narration by Peter Cullen.
14	And Now Back To Voltron...	0:09	Used to transition back from commercial break. Narration by Peter Cullen.
15	Quick Harp	0:08	
16	Majestic	0:21	
17	Castle of Lions	0:37	
18	Sad Princess	1:06	
19	Our Prayers Answered (Dialogue)	0:16	Narration by Peter Cullen
20	At The Lake	0:22	
21	Hunk and Pidge	0:31	
22	Rushing	1:16	
23	The Cave	1:10	
24	Bumper #2	0:08	Second of three bumpers to transition to a commercial break.
25	Sand People	1:00	
26	Captured	0:42	
27	A Spy	0:48	
28	Voltron Arrives	0:19	
29	We Are Friends	1:33	
30	Defeat	0:27	
31	Quick Harp #2	0:08	
32	It's Me	0:36	
33	King Alford	0:25	
34	Tension	0:22	
35	Underground Base	1:23	
36	Montage	2:09	
37	Bumper #3	0:17	Third and final bumper to transition to a commercial break.
38	Voltron Will Be Back (Instrumental)	0:10	
39	Ready To Form Voltron (Dialogue)	1:10	Dialogue by Jack Angel, Michael Bell, Neil Ross, B.J. Ward & Lennie Weinrib
40	Voltron Closer	0:58	World Events Productions logo stinger at the end of the song.
41	Original Opener	1:17	No narration version
42	Original Opener w/Sing Out	1:17	No narration version
43	Original Closer	0:56	World Events Productions logo stinger at the end of the song.
44	Form Voltron Sound FX	0:37	
45	Voltage SFX	0:08	
46	Voltage Bump	0:08	
47	Magic, Fire SFX	0:24	
48	Voltron DJ MacMan Dance Remix	2:08	A bonus remix track of all of tracks. Dialogue by Jack Angel.
49	All Music Compilation	21:14	All music from the soundtrack in one track
50	Music of Voltron Montage	8:23	A montage of music from the soundtrack

Voltron: The Third Dimension Track Listings		
Track No.	Song title	Run Time
01	Spacey Opening	0:18
02	Voltron 3D Theme	1:02
03	Big Orchestra'	1:35
04	Castle of the Lion Theme	1:18
05	Angular Orchestra	1:16
06	Hunk & Pidge	0:43
07	Military Background	0:59
08	Lion Launch Sequence	1:11
09	Space Lice	0:48
10	History of the Lions	1:36
11	Military Action	1:02
12	The Transformation	1:12
13	Gnarly Rock	0:41
14	Light Tension	1:10
15	Lotor & Amalgamus	1:09
16	Sweet Strings	0:18
17	Get Funky	0:42
18	Robeast Rock	1:20
19	Into Stealth	1:04
20	Stealth Voltron	0:46
21	Thematic Bridge	0:40

DreamWorks Voltron Legendary Defender Season 1 Track Listings		
Track No.	Song title	Run Time
01	DreamWorks Voltron Legendary Defender Theme Song	0:55
02	Try This	1:25
03	Help Us Find It	0:58
04	Detecting Voltron	2:58
05	Let's Get That Cannon	1:52
06	Goodbye Father	1:26
07	Robeast Arrives	2:13
08	The Balmera Lives	2:46
09	To Go Home	2:00
10	Supposed to Be My Lion	1:33
11	Voltron Transformation	0:46

== Comic books ==
=== 1980s ===
In 1985, Modern Comics, an imprint of Charlton Comics, produced a three-issue mini-series based on the Lion Voltron television show.

=== 2000s ===
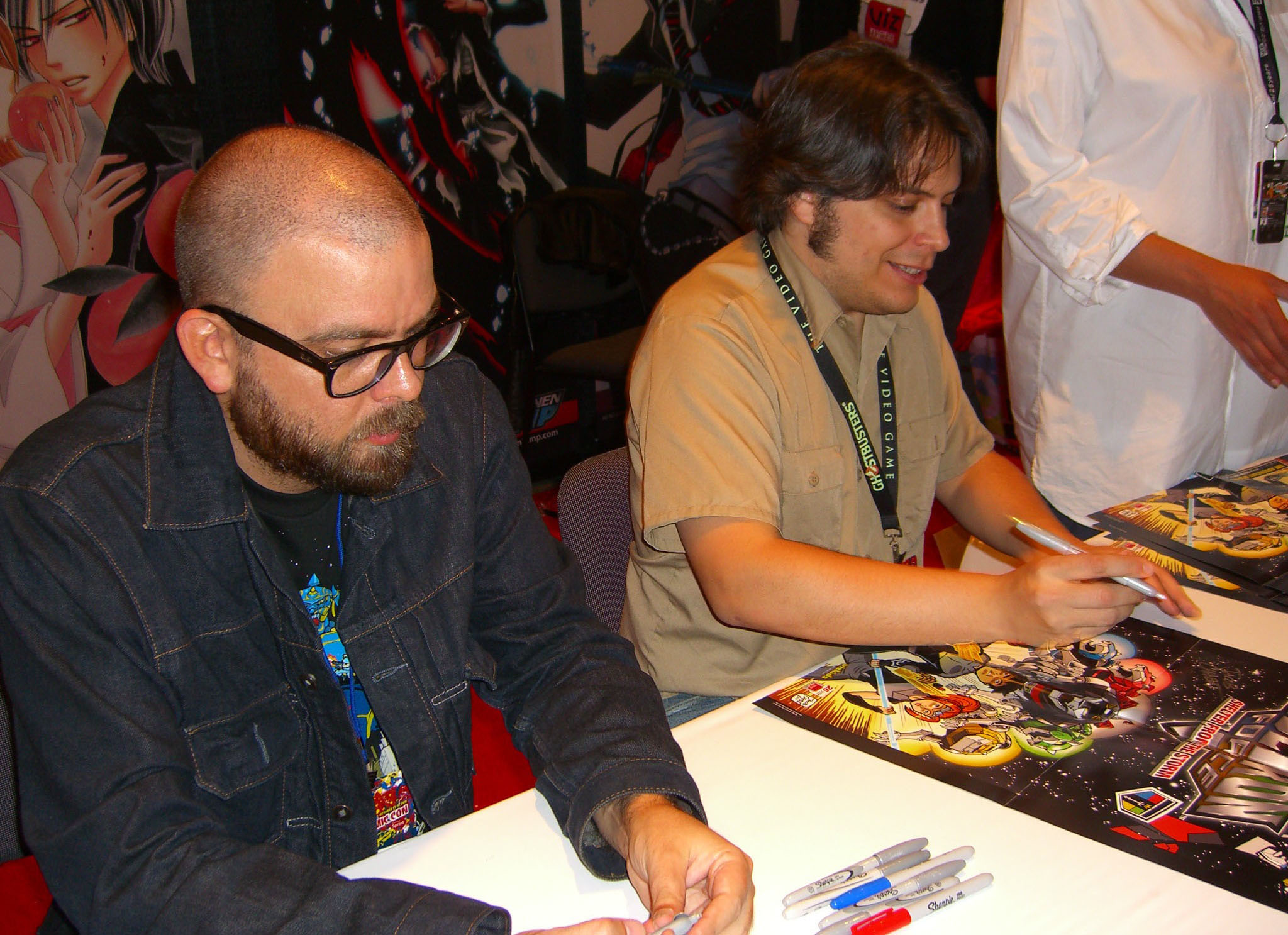
Voltron comics creators Brian Smith and Jacob Chabot signing Voltron posters at the Viz Media booth at the 2011 New York Comic Con.

In 2002, comic book publisher Devil's Due announced that it had acquired the rights to publish Voltron comic books. Devil's Due, through Image Comics, published a five issue mini-series (preceded by a #0 issue from Dreamwave) which featured the Lion Voltron incarnation of the character and rebooted the property. This was then followed by an ongoing series self-published by Devil's Due, which was placed on hiatus in 2005 after the eleventh issue, due to poor sales.

Devil's Due announced in January 2008 that the five-issue mini-series, the eleven issues of the ongoing series, and the #0 issue would be collected into a Voltron Omnibus trade paperback that would also include the unpublished twelfth issue of the ongoing series that would wrap up all the storylines.

In July 2008, a new five issue mini-series was released by Devil's Due, which picked up where the ongoing series left off. This series further explored the origins of Lion Voltron's creation, from 12,000 years in the past to the present day. The mini-series showed Voltron existing as a single construct created by sorcerers and scientists, resembling a knight. During its battle with the first Drule Empire, Voltron was tricked by Haggar into landing on a black comet with the gravitational attraction of a singularity. Voltron was then attacked by Haggar, and blown into five pieces. However, the intervention of a sorcerer resulted in the five pieces becoming the five lions as they descended onto Arus.

The original five issue mini-series was adapted as the 2007 motion comic Voltron: Defenders of the Universe – Revelations. Its sequel, Voltron: Defenders of the Universe – Paradise Lost, adapted the first story arc of the ongoing series, introducing the V-15 and its pilots. The Devil's Due run is now collected digitally exclusively through Devil's Due Digital.

=== 2010s ===
In 2011, Dynamite Entertainment announced plans to publish Voltron comics, while Viz Media's young readers imprint, Viz Kids, announced plans to publish a series of graphic novels called Voltron Force, on which Bian Smith would serve as head writer, and Jacob Chabot and Dario Brizuela would serve as lead artists.

In September 2015, Dynamite released Voltron: From The Ashes, written by Cullen Bunn with art by Blacky Shepherd.

== Toys ==
=== Matchbox ===
Matchbox imported the Lion Force Voltron, Gladiator Voltron, and Vehicle Force Voltron diecast toys from Popy of Japan in 1984. The company also released 6-inch figures of the Voltron robots that were more affordable, but lacked the detail level of their larger counterparts and could not separate into their component forms.

=== Panosh Place ===
At the peak of the series' popularity, Panosh Place released new Voltron toys, including action figures of the characters and a larger Voltron toy that could fit them.

=== Trendmasters ===
To coincide with the 1998 broadcast of Voltron: The Third Dimension, the now-defunct Trendmasters reissued the Matchbox diecast Lion Force Voltron, with a few changes to the mold and a total of 17 weapons in comparison to the original's sword and shield. Trendmasters also released the newer Stealth Voltron and Voltrex variants at various sizes, as well as character action figures to go along with them. A dragon version of Voltron called Dracotron was prototyped but never made it to production.

=== Toynami ===
Shortly after the demise of Trendmasters, Toynami acquired the Voltron license and released their Masterpiece Voltron toy in 2005. Boasting more detail and articulation than the previous toys, the Masterpiece Voltron sold for US$139 to US$149.99 at the time of its release. In 2007, Toynami sold an all-plastic version of the Masterpiece Voltron for up to one-third of the first release's price (ranging from US$49 to US$60). A variant of this version was packaged and sold with a Voltron line of Reebok sneakers. For the 25th anniversary of the cartoon franchise in 2009, the plastic Masterpiece Voltron was reissued in a metallic repaint.

=== Mattel ===
In late 2011, Mattel designed but never released toys for the new Voltron Force series, while its online collectors' site MattyCollector.com sold brand new toys for the classic series – including a 23-inch Voltron that fits 4-inch pilot figures in each lion.

=== Playmates Toys ===
In 2017, Playmates Toys released toys based on Voltron: Legendary Defender. Though only three pilot action figures were ever released before the line was terminated.

=== Bandai ===
In early 2017 Bandai Japan, who produced the toys of Beast King GoLion and Armored Fleet Dairugger XV back in their initial releases, released a Soul of Chogokin version of the GoLion robot. The box was repackaged as Voltron for its American release. A Dairugger XV version was later produced in 2019, similarly branded as Vehicle Voltron in the US release. WEP purchased the rights to the original Dairugger XV as well as Albegas and Golion some time previously, so Bandai had to relicense the toys back from WEP to produce them.

=== Lego ===
In August 2017, Lego announced that a forthcoming Lego Ideas set based upon classic Voltron will be placed into production. The set was released on August 1, 2018, coinciding with the final seasons of Voltron: Legendary Defender.

== Other merchandise ==
Privateer Press released a Voltron: Defender of the Universe expansion set for their Monsterpocalypse battle miniatures game series in 2010.

In 2012, Voltron was shown in MetLife's "Everyone" commercial during Super Bowl XLVI.

In 2023, 4 Hands Brewing Company, based in WEP LLC's hometown of St. Louis, launched a six-part, two-year licensed series of Voltron-themed beers, each "volume" a collaboration with a different craft brewery.

== Video games ==
=== Voltron: Defender of the Universe (2011) ===
In December 2009, Sony Pictures Home Entertainment announced the first ever Voltron video game would be released on mobile phones in the US, including the iPhone. The game would have 30 levels and 6 acts, isometric gameplay and gamers will command robot lions to traverse the galaxy and take on King Zarkon's evil droid armies. In 2011, Voltron: Defender of the Universe, produced by THQ and Behaviour Interactive, was developed for home console play. A 1-5 player co-op game, it was released on November 29, 2011, for the PlayStation Network and November 30, 2011, for the Xbox Live Arcade. The First Trailer has been announced on IGN.com and tentatively priced at $10. Players will be able fight as the individual lions in an overhead shooter style gameplay to then form Voltron to take on Robeasts in a fighter style combat.

=== Voltron: Cubes of Olkarion (2019) ===
In 2018, NBCUniversal announced the video game Voltron: Cubes of Olkarion, the winner of their developer competition Universal GameDev Challenge that had offered game developers the opportunity to use some of Universal's IP. In 2019, Voltron: Cubes of Olkarion, produced by indie game studio Gbanga, was made published on the Steam store in Early Access, the platform's experimental game program. In the game, players compete in real-time player vs player (PvP) game battles by placing own and destroying opponent blocks with different features in a game board with a grid. In 2025, the game was marked as last having received an update "over 4 years ago" and was no longer available on the Steam store.

== Animation staff ==
- Original story: Saburo Yatsude
- Chief Director: Katsuhiko Taguchi
- Character Designer & Chief Animation Director: Kazuo Nakamura
- Episode Directors: Kazufumi Nomura, Kazuyuki Okaseko, Hiroshi Sasagawa, Katsuhiko Taguchi, Katsuhito Akiyama
- Scenarists: Ryo Nakahara, Masaaki Sakurai, Susumu Takahisa
- Music: Masahisa Takeichi (incidental), Asei Kobayashi (opening/closing themes)
- Theme song performance (GoLion): Ichirou Mizuki (OP- Tatakae! Goraion, ED- Gonin de Hitotsu)
- Production: Toei Animation Co., Ltd. / Toei Advertising Co. Ltd (credited as "Toei Agency")
