= Voltron: Defender of the Universe (video game) =

2011 video game

- Developer: Behaviour Interactive
- Publisher: THQ
- Composer: Jean-Sébastien Robitaille
- Platforms: PlayStation 3, Xbox 360
- Release: PlayStation 3 November 29, 2011; Xbox 360; November 30, 2011
- Genres: Adventure, multidirectional shooter

Voltron: Defender of the Universe is a twin stick shooter adventure game based on the Voltron television series, developed by Behaviour Interactive and published by THQ. The game was released on November 29, 2011, for the PlayStation 3, and the following day for the Xbox 360. The game allows players to play as all five lions from the series and to control Voltron, a huge robot formed by combining those lions. The game received mixed reception among critics. Some reviewers were critical of the Voltron robot gameplay sequences, yet others praised the lion sequences. Most critics spoke highly of the fan service given. The game is now delisted and not available for purchase.

== Plot ==
Voltron: Defender of the Universe is based on the anime series of the same name. Five pilots, known as the Voltron Force, pilot large mechanized lions in defense of the universe. They defend the universe primarily against King Zarkon and his Drule Army, which also consists of special creations known as robeasts. These creatures are hundreds of feet tall and can best the Voltron Force in their individual lions. Therefore, in times of greater peril the five lions can combine to form Voltron, a massive robot able to best robeasts and restore peace.

The story is an amalgam of multiple episodes from cartoon series. The first act begins with an attack by King Zarkon and the Drule Army on the Planet Arus. Much of this act revolves around the Voltron episode The Missing Key, including Voltron's first battle with a robeast. The second act again pits the Voltron Force against the Drule Army on a distant planet which culminates in a battle versus a Voltron doppelganger, similar to the episode Voltron vs Voltron. The final act is similar to the Voltron episode Zarkon Becomes a Robeast in that the Voltron Force must face a robeast-sized King Zarkon in the game's final battle.

== Gameplay ==
In Voltron players control the individual lions for most portions (top). During boss battles Voltron is controlled cooperatively by all players.

Voltron: Defender of the Universe is played primarily as a twin stick shooter. During most levels players control one of five Voltron lions. The lions are equipped with multi-directional cannons, controlled with the right thumbstick, while the left thumbstick coordinates movement. Each lion is equipped with pounce and melee attacks. Each lion features a unique special attack and individual strengths and weaknesses. These levels consist of both ground and space-based levels, with only secondary controls changing between the two environments. The game features cooperative gameplay with up to five players. Up to two players can play on a local machine, and the game supports any combination of local and online players up to five. The game features leaderboards and a downloadable challenge mode in which players must combat increasingly difficult waves of enemies.

Also featured during ground-based levels is a feature known as Survival Mode. This mode is activated when a lion takes too much damage. The player character is ejected from the cockpit and must survive for 10 seconds while the lion repairs itself. During these sequences the character is equipped with a blaster and must survive on foot, using the same multi-directional gameplay mechanics as when piloting the lion. Once the 10 seconds have elapsed the player character can re-enter the lion's cockpit and resume normal gameplay. Players can also find collectible items throughout the level which can provide their character with an extra life or additional, temporary features such as enhanced firepower.

During boss battles the lions merge to form the Voltron robot. Gameplay during these sequences is turn-based and also relies on quick time events. When playing with two or more players control is shared; one player chooses the attack while all others attempt to move their reticule to the center of the targeted area. Regardless of the number of players a sequence begins by choosing one of four attacks, after which a quick time event occurs. During the enemy's turn players can defend by performing a similar quick time event. Once the enemy's health is depleted a final event occurs in which Voltron forms its Blazing Sword to dispatch the villain.

== Development ==
The game was unveiled at San Diego Comic-Con, which included a Voltron panel. It was developed by Behaviour Interactive and published by THQ. Original clips and voice overs from the show as well as remastered music are also featured in the game. THQ's Russell Brock stated that Voltron's development was a "labor of love". Brock cited the original voice clips and video clips from the show as well as Peter Cullen's inclusion as narrator. He also stated that as an "in gag" for Voltron fans the pilot of the blue lion changes from Sven to Allura as the game progresses. The game's soundtrack was remastered and modified to fit the length of the video game.

As part of the game's promotions, there was a Voltron scavenger hunt that took place at the convention. The scavenger hunt entitled, The Hunt to Form Voltron had participants use their smartphones to find the five Voltron lion stands and their corresponding QR codes. At each stand, participants received an exclusive button and a chance to win a variety of collectible prizes from THQ, Mattel, WEP, Viz Media and Classic Media including: a 92-inch flat screen Mitsubishi television, an Xbox 360 console, classic Voltron action figures, Voltron retro T-shirts and DVDs.

== Reception ==
Reception

Aggregate scores
Aggregator	Score
GameRankings	57.25% (PS3); 54.94% (X360)
Metacritic	51/100 (PS3); 48/100 (X360)

Review scores
Publication	Score
GameSpot	4.5/10
IGN	4/10
TeamXbox	6/10
Inside Gaming	8/10
UGO	B−

Voltron: Defender of the Universe received mixed reviews from critics. On review aggregation website Metacritic the game has a score of 51 out of 100 on the PlayStation 3, while the Xbox 360 version has a score of 48 out of 100. GameRankings gives a slightly higher score, with the PlayStation 3 version averaging 57.25% and the Xbox 360 version a score of 54.94%. Early sales analysis reported over 9,000 units as of year-end 2011.

The critics were most divided in terms of Voltron's gameplay. Inside Gaming Daily's Brian P Rubin felt that the game's controls were "extremely responsive" and that each of the five lions had a slightly different feel. Tristan Ogilvie of IGN was much more critical of the gameplay. He called it "a tiresome slog through nondescript planetside levels and generic asteroid fields in space. " Paul Furfari of UGO praised the Survival Mode mechanic. He felt that it enhanced gameplay and gave players a "fighting chance, even if [they're] dodging and weaving past an onslaught of enemy lasers."

Critics were mostly unified in the opinion that the game paid fan service to those who follow the series. GameSpot reviewer Kat Bailey felt the inclusion of original voice and film clips from the show "lend[s] a nostalgic flavor." UGO's Paul Furfari agreed and said "You can tell that the developers are fans of Voltron, particularly because they aren't shy with hitting your nostalgia bone." Tyler Rowe of Team Xbox also concurred. He stated that "you'll feel a blast from the past when you load up Voltron: Defender of the Universe," further adding, "the amount of nostalgia ... packed into the game may make it a worthy purchase for Voltron fans."
