= Voltron Force =

TV series or program

- Voltron Force logo
- Also known as: Voltron Force: New Defenders Trilogy
- Genre: Adventure; Science fiction
- Created by: World Events Productions
- Based on: Beast King GoLion by Toei Animation; Voltron by World Events Productions and Toei Animation
- Developed by: Todd Garfield
- Directed by: Steven E. Gordon; John Delaney
- Voices of: Mark Hildreth; Andrew Francis; Ty Olsson; Garry Chalk; Shannon Chan-Kent; Ashleigh Ball; Sam Vincent; Tabitha St. Germain; Giles Panton; Doron Bell Jr. Vincent Tong; Ron Halder; Gabe Khouth; Alan Marriott
- Theme music composer: Kasseem "Swizz Beatz" Dean
- Composers: Steffan Andrews; Hal Beckett
- Countries of origin: United States; Canada
- Original language: English
- No. of seasons: 1
- No. of episodes: 26 (list of episodes)

Production
- Executive producers: Robert Koplar; Ted Koplar; Loris Kramer Lunsford; Jason Netter
- Producer: Susan Norkin
- Editor: Joshua Mark Guitar
- Running time: 22 minutes
- Production companies: World Events Productions; Classic Media; Kickstart Productions

Original release
- Network: Nicktoons
- Release: June 16, 2011 – April 25, 2012

Related
- Voltron: The Third Dimension; Voltron: Legendary Defender

Voltron Force is an animated television series that premiered on June 16, 2011, exclusively on Nicktoons. It is a sequel to the 1980s animated series Voltron and the 1999 CGI series Voltron: The Third Dimension. It ended after one season on April 25, 2012, with the planned second season being unproduced.

== Premise ==
The series intro is narrated by Daniel (Vincent Tong):

Evil is back. The Drule King Lotor has returned with a dark energy that can destroy the galaxy. Our only hope, the Voltron Force: A team of five heroic pilots that control five awesome robot lions. When Lotor's monstrous Robeasts attack, the lions come together to form Voltron, Defender of the Universe.

The show centers on the reunion of the original Voltron Force and the group of cadets training to follow in their footsteps. In battle, they pilot their five robot lions and, when necessary, combine them to form the mighty robot Voltron. Among the enemies they face are their old nemesis, Lotor, and a corrupt military head intent on destroying Voltron and assassinating the Voltron Force to stage a coup d'état and become president of Galaxy Garrison himself.

== Cast ==
- Mark Hildreth as King Lotor
- Andrew Francis as Lance McClain
- Ty Olsson as Hunk Garrett
- Garry Chalk as Sky Marshall Wade, Manset
- Shannon Chan-Kent as Larmina
- Ashleigh Ball as Allura, Daigo
- Sam Vincent as Pidge, King Alfor, Sypat, Dudley
- Tabitha St. Germain as Kala
- Giles Panton as Keith Kogane
- Doron Bell Jr. as Vince
- Vincent Tong as Daniel
- Ron Halder as Maahox, Coran
- Gabe Khouth as Chip (Pidge's brother)
- Alan Marriott as Sven Holgersson

== Development and marketing ==
On March 11, 2010, at the Nickelodeon Upfront Presentation, a new Voltron series entitled Voltron Panthera Force was announced and set for premiere in the fall on Nicktoons with an announced premise that "The series follows the exploits of a group of five young cadets brought together under trying circumstances to form a newly appointed Voltron Lion Squad dubbed the "Panthera Force". Voltron Panthera Force is a World Wide Events production in conjunction with Kick Start Production." On April 4, 2010, it was announced that the show's title had been changed from Voltron Panthera Force to Voltron Force. On June 7, 2010, Variety announced WEP Productions, Classic Media and Kickstart Entertainment's plans to air a 26 episode season of Voltron Force in 2011 to coincide with the 25th anniversary of the original series as well as Mattel's plans to release a toyline to tie-in with the 25th anniversary of the original series and the launch of the new series. In March 2011, it was announced that Emmy-nominated composer Hal Beckett and Gemini-nominated composer Steffan Andrews, would score the show.

The Voltron Force logo and storyboards have been revealed on the official Facebook profile for the show, which is run by World Events Productions. WEP and video game publisher THQ has announced a partnership to produce video games based on the classic Voltron series and Voltron Force in 2011 and 2012 respectively; However, only the game based on the classic series was released on Xbox Live Arcade and PlayStation Network in November 2011. Following the closure of THQ and its subsidiaries, the future and rights of the Voltron video games remain in question.

== Cancellation ==
At the end of "Black", Daniel still has Haggarium in him and was shown briefly attacking the other members of the Voltron force in the black lion. There was supposed to be a second season which was briefly in the works, but due to complications with budget funding for the second season, it was never made and the show was cancelled, ending it on an unresolved cliffhanger.

== Episodes ==
No.	Title	Directed by	Written by	Original release date
1	"New School Defenders"	John Delaney	Todd Garfield story by: Jeremy Corray and Todd Garfield	June 16, 2011
After Voltron's victory over Lotor and his army, the Robot Lions lost control during a celebratory event and nearly destroyed a city. Because of this, Galaxy Alliance commander Sky Marshall Wade ordered the Lions to be dismissed from their duty as defenders of the universe and disbanded the Voltron Force. Since that day only the Galaxy Alliance has been in charge of protecting the universe while Lance, Pidge, and Hunk are acting officers in the army, Princess Allura is ruling her home planet Arus, and Keith is a fugitive from the Alliance. Daniel is a mischievous and curious student in the Galaxy Alliance air school. Daniel and fellow student Vince are recruited into the Voltron Force as junior cadets and later become members of a resistance against Sky Marshall Wade, during which Keith infiltrates Wade's secret base and searches for the Black Lion. Now, as part of the resistance's plan, Daniel and Vince sneak into Wade's room and switch out his prized pin with a fake one and head back to "The Den", the resistance headquarters. The reason is that the four insignias on the pin are actually the keys to reactivate the Lions. Meanwhile, Keith discovers his Black Lion and breaks it and himself out of the base, contacting Pidge and trying to escape Wade's security.
2	"Defenders of Arus"	John Delaney	Todd Garfield story by: Jeremy Corray and Todd Garfield	June 16, 2011
Daniel and Vince arrive at the Castle of Lions and meet a fellow Cadet named Larmina, who is revealed to be Princess Allura's niece and the trio are given their "Voltcoms", special gauntlets that access special abilities within them and will allow them in the future to pilot the Lions. As Pidge and Hunk go to rescue Keith from drifting into space (due to the fact that Wade's experiments on Black Lion have left it barely with any power), Kala, a Drule commander/strategist, and Maahox, a scientist, succeed in bringing Lotor back to life. They explain how long he has been gone and the changes that have been made to his army, and send a Robeast to Arus to battle the Voltron Force. Lance and Allura realize that they must fight it without the other three Lions. When the fight gets too much for Lance and Allura, Daniel and the others get to the Green (Vince and Larmina) and Yellow (Daniel) Lions to help fight off the Robeast alongside Lance and Allura, but even that proves to be not enough to turn the tide. Pidge and Hunk save Keith and send him into Arus' atmosphere to crash land on the planet, accidentally decapitating the Robeast and destroying it. As Lotor watches in anger, Kala and Maahox explain how the same Robeast was from his time and the beasts are not enough to defeat the Voltron of today.
3	"Defenders of the Universe"	John Delaney	Todd Garfield story by: Jeremy Corray and Todd Garfield	June 16, 2011
After the previous events, Wade goes insane and kidnaps the Alliance and replaces its soldiers with robots, while additionally holding Coran hostage. Meanwhile Lotor and Maahox plot to send a new Robeast to Arus to destroy Voltron as it is powered by a combination of Kala, the Drule commander that Maahox terminated and Haggarium, the substance that Kala's energy apparently stabilized and was used to resurrect Lotor. As the Lions fight the Kala Spider Robeast (with Daniel piloting the Red Lion along with Lance due to an injury he sustained), Keith and Larmina fend off Wade's robots on the ground and Vince works on fixing the Black Lion, Wade (on another planet with Coran as his hostage) sends a massive Robot Lion to battle both the Voltron Force and Kala. At one point the Kala Robeast absorbs the power of Wade's Lion, severing the connection between Wade and the Lion, and forms a Mega Spider Robeast. Vince informs the team that he has completed the repairs of the Black Lion which sends Daniel back to the Castle using his "Speed Claws" Voltcom ability to retrieve it. Keith and Larmina board the Black Lion and upon Keith's command, the Lions unite to form Voltron. During the skirmish, they learn that their attacks aren't working and all but the Black Lion are too weak to form the Blazing Sword since it's surrounded by Haggarium-laced webs. But, after a boost from Vince's Voltcom, Voltron goes to full power, forms the Blazing Sword and defeats Kala.
4	"Coran, Coran"	John Delaney	Brandon Sawyer story by: Brandon Sawyer and Todd Garfield	June 23, 2011
When Pidge shows off the new tail-weapon upgrades, the Voltron Force receives a distress call from Coran who warns them of a moon-base factory on Tarvos that will be manufacturing an invincible army for Sky Marshall Wade. But when they try to rescue him, they fall into a trap set by Wade as the real Coran is trapped inside and must search for him while battling Wade's own experimental versions of the Lions. Meanwhile, the cadets soon learn it's a Coran imposter that's actually a robot strapped with a time bomb and must face it in a fight.
5	"Joyride To Doom"	John Delaney	Ross Beeley story by: Todd Garfield and Jeremy Corray	June 30, 2011
When the cadets grow impatient with their lack of flight hours in the Lions, Daniel convinces the group to borrow the Lions so they can sneak off to go to Planet Doom, Lotor's home planet to grab a sample of Haggarium. But they soon find themselves abducted by Maahox, who studies Vince's strange energy signature. Meanwhile, Lotor invades the Castle of Lions and takes Allura hostage, and Voltron debuts a new reconfiguration ability during the rescue; Lance's red-center form for Voltron with "Magma Pistols".
6	"The Hunkyard"	John Delaney	Todd Garfield story by: Jeremy Corray and Todd Garfield	July 7, 2011
Hunk takes the cadets on a bonding mission to his secret junkyard called The Hunkyard to learn teamwork and to build "crush cars" so they can have their own vehicles. However, cadet bonding day comes to a halt when an army of Waderoids powered by Haggarium attack them and form together to make a massive scrap monster out of junk. When the rest of the Voltron Force arrives, they take the beast down by taking on a new form that makes Yellow Lion the body and head of Voltron and forms "Rock Wrecking Maces" as his battle weapon.
7	"Lion Riders Return"	John Delaney	Brandon Sawyer story by: Todd Garfield and Jeremy Corray	July 14, 2011
The Voltron Force travels to the peaceful planet Ariel to defend a race of lion-riding warriors from Sky Marshall Wade who is extracting a powerful metal ore called corite from their mines with Haggarium tipped drills. While playing their video game, the cadets are interrupted by a mysterious ally named Daigo asking for help from an impending danger with the Krelshi, ghostly beasts that are now in a frenzy, and travel with the rest of the team on the mission. Thinking that Voltron force is their enemy, Ariel's ancient lion protectors, the Lion Riders attack, but their leader, Chief Kalon recognizes Princess Allura and tells his riders to back off. They then team up to stop the Drillers, Wade's corite-extracting machines and later the cadets find out what's causing the Krelshi's abnormal behavior and eventually return to normal.
8	"Flash Form Go!"	John Delaney	Chris Bishop and Adam F. Goldberg story by: Todd Garfield and Jeremy Corray	July 21, 2011
Voltron Force begin noticing several large holes being formed at different locations on the planet. They learn that whatever is creating the holes is apparently a hyperspeed Robeast trying to find the hidden lairs of the Lions. Lance and Daniel take the Red Lion to investigate but they nearly get destroyed when they encounter the assailant. When the rest finally encounters the attacker, the team attempts to form Voltron but before they can complete the formation the Robeast hits them and splits them up. They try several more times and fail each time until Keith calls a retreat. Daniel explains that it takes 36 seconds for the formation to be completed and they need to find a way to accelerate the transformation. Daniel and Vince take the Red Lion out to test the theory that Daniel's Voltcom speed can be applied to the Lions and they encounter the creature which appears to be a giant eye. Lance is infuriated that Daniel and Vince again took a Lion out for a joyride, but the other members chide Lance for lecturing the duo instead of thanking them for being able to get a picture of the Robeast. When the beast attacks again the team heads out and finally forms Voltron by having Daniel's Voltcom activate "Flash Form", which skips the familiar commands and forms Voltron immediately. Voltron attacks the giant eye and forms the Blazing Sword to, along with a speed boost from Daniel, finish off the creature, but a shard of it returns to Maahox's own eye and seemingly reveals the Lion's location to him.
9	"Dark Blue"	John Delaney	Todd Garfield story by: Todd Garfield and Jeremy Corray	July 28, 2011
Vince's efforts to prove himself to the team end up with him trapped aboard a Haggarium filled shipping vessel that's sinking in a bottomless ocean planet. But he and the Voltron Force debut a new reconfiguration ability while underwater in Allura's new formation of the "Titanic Trident" blue-center form for Voltron.
10	"Wanted and Unwanted"	John Delaney	Ross Beeley story by: Todd Garfield and Jeremy Corray	August 4, 2011
Keith allows himself to get captured by robots in order to get aboard Wade's invisible prison vessel called "The Void", run by Sky Marshall Wade so he can break out political prisoners of the Den Resistance. However, Daniel gets caught with him and meets Keith's smuggler friend Manset who helps him survive on the inside while Wade throws Keith into the "Black Hole" where he encounters Chief Kalon of the Lion Riders. Daniel then has to fight Kloak, an invisible warrior who guards the Void generator so he and Keith can escape the ship and get their friends to safety.
11	"Predator Robeast"	John Delaney	Adam Beechen story by: Todd Garfield and Jeremy Corray	August 11, 2011
Voltron Force face their toughest challenge when they take on a powerful newly formed enemy when Lotor's five predators unite to become one powerful robeast. Meanwhile, the cadets test out a new castle defense system for when the team goes away on a mission, but Lotor's ships enter the atmosphere with his five robeasts: a minotaur, a shark, a snake, a wolf, and a dragon.
12	"Hungry for Voltron"	John Delaney	Len Uhley story by: Todd Garfield and Jeremy Corray	August 18, 2011
Princess Allura teaches the cadets about "tact", being ambassadors of Voltron Force, a symbol of peace and justice. But Larmina being bound to Arus is convinced that her home planet is the best at everything and just thinks it's a speech of respecting other cultures. Coran receives a message on the old multi-face diplomatic channel from Sypat, ruler of Planet Ebb. He and his people are no longer willing to stand for Sky Marshall Wade's tyranny of the galaxy and wants to form an alliance with Arus and Voltron Force and asks Allura to come to Ebb. However, Lance thinks it's a trap but Allura takes Coran and Larmina in the blue lion and soon discover Lance was right indeed. They are caught in Wade's blockade of Ebb and are forced to fight in his combat arena that's televised to all the planets during a live transmission. The rest of the force comes to the rescue and Sypat gets Larmina's voltcom back and she helps out as well. Meanwhile, Wade's robots form a giant robot that does battle with a four lion Voltron that's weak without Allura's blue lion, but she manages to form a leg and takes out the giant robot saving Ebb which is now a free planet once again. In the end, Larmina finally learns the value of being a good-will ambassador. Lance and Keith resolve to take Wade down once and for all.
13	"Clash of the Lions"	John Delaney	Brandon Sawyer story by: Todd Garfield and Jeremy Corray	August 25, 2011
After trying to take Allura out, Voltron Force travels to Earth to finish the fight with Wade once and for all, but are soon hijacked by Wade's Voltron-controlling device. However, Allura refuses to be a part of the team's assault for revenge instead of having Voltron continue to be the Defender of the Universe. Meanwhile, Coran shares his history with Wade when they were cadets at the Galaxy Alliance Academy and how they were selected to pilot the lions. Wade's downward spiral began when he was rejected by the lions because they sensed he wasn't worthy of piloting them. So he set out to prove himself better than Voltron by building his own war machine. Wade's plan comes into effect when he blasts Voltron with a charge of Corite metal dug from the heart of planet Ariel and this rejects the Voltron Force transferring Wade in his place, forming Wade's face as Voltron's head. In order to stop him, Daniel and Vince head back to "The Den" at their old flight academy to get the message out while the rest of the team battle Wade's robotic lions. Vince discovers that Wade tamed the lions with the Corite charge which built its own nervous system that access the nexus and change how Voltron works. Voltron Force and the cadets then combine Voltcom powers to stop Wade and backup arrives when Manset, the smuggler sends an airship filled with Chief Kalon and his Lion Riders to join the battle. Wade is finally taken to jail. Voltron is reunited once again and Allura realizes the Defender of the Universe is ever evolving and is not the same Voltron she grew up with. Meanwhile, Pidge finds out that the Corite charge, when piercing Voltron, pierced Black Lion's piece of the 'nexus', releasing all kinds of seemingly untranslatable ancient data.
14	"Inside the Music"	John Delaney	Mark Drop story by: Todd Garfield and Jeremy Corray	November 3, 2011
After Wade's defeat, Larmina is tasked with organizing a universe victory concert she names The Great Galactic Music Festival for peace. However, she and the others are unaware that Lotor's spies have infiltrated the celebration. Also, the cadets find out Pidge is leading a secret double life when he books Larmina's favorite band Stereolatic and poses as DJ Prong. Meanwhile, the force finds out who the Drule agent is and must battle a giant robeast that was created from the stage using "Tech Ninja Voltron", Pidge's green-center form of Voltron with "Boomerang Shield".
15	"Rogue Trip"	John Delaney	Daniel Powell story by: Todd Garfield, Jeremy Corray and Adam Hackbarth	November 10, 2011
After racing their crush cars, the cadets modify them to transform into their very own version of Voltron they name "Awesometron". But when Hunk gets hungry the cadets take a road trip to Earth for a pizza run, but while there they encounter a dangerous Voltron-obsessed fan named Dudley with sinister intentions. While on Earth, Larmina realization she has missed out on a lot due to her royal upbringing, decides to ditch her teammates and go have some fun with her new friends. Also, Pidge accidentally sets off the Black Lion's security system while trying to remove its piece of the nexus, causing it to come to life, so the force has to hunt the lion down on Arus and bring it back home.
16	"Brains"	John Delaney	Hans Rodionoff story by: Todd Garfield and Jeremy Corray	November 17, 2011
When Pidge can't get into contact with his brother Chip on Intergalactic Ninja Appreciation Day, he gets worried about him and travels with the rest of the force to his home planet of Balto where every inhabitant is a ninja-scientist. While there, they discovery that everyone has fallen off the grid going into stealth mode and turned into mindless "ninja-scientist zombies" with an appetite for Voltron Force brains. They find the root of the cause when Lotor appears and is more powerful than ever when he's able to transform into a Samurai Robeast which Voltron must defeat with Larmina's martial art form with her blazing katana in order to save the citizens from Maahox's brain vacuum for sucking out information about Voltron.
17	"Ghost in the Lion"	John Delaney	Jeremy Corray story by: Todd Garfield and Jeremy Corray	November 27, 2011
After the Blue Lion is stolen, the remaining lions track it to a barely inhabitable frozen planet. When they locate the stolen lion, Voltron Force finds out the long-lost former Blue Lion pilot, Sven has returned and had stolen the Blue Lion in an effort to save his son. But Sven is then double-crossed by Maahox and the force must help their old teammate in order to get his son back.
18	"Gary"	John Delaney	Scott Sonneborn story by: Todd Garfield and Jeremy Corray	February 29, 2012
Maahox develops a gremlin-like holographic pet, which he sends to attack the Castle of Lions through Pidge's videogame. When Vince finishes the game, beating the final boss, he downloads his prize—Maahox's pet and names him "Gary". However, the seemingly harmless cute creature soon causes chaos for the force by multiplying himself in order to destroy the castle's defenses. After being captured by Hunk's space mouse trap device, Gary escapes and grows into a monstrous version of himself as he attacks the Voltron Nexus. Pidge finds a way to defeat Gary by re-rigging the mouse trap to make what he calls a "Gary Bomb" so the space mice can carry it inside the creature, but in the end, the damage to Voltron's inner workings has caused major damage.
19	"Five Forged"	John Delaney	Brandon Sawyer story by: Todd Garfield and Jeremy Corray	March 7, 2012
After trying to repair the Black Lion's Haggarium-infected Nexus, the Voltron Force track the lions to planet Ariel. However, they must survive a series of trials in the Path of Lions, Den of Creation, sacred grounds deep inside the mines in The Forge where Voltron was originally forged in order to find his creator. But the Krelshi (electric spirit lions) blocks Vince from the entrance warning him that even though he's worthy of being on the force, he's not ready for the trials yet. Meanwhile, the trials are taking place down below; first the team must escape a giant electrified circuit board tech puzzle. Then the team must speed through a series of death-traps of swinging blades and giant hammers. Next are two chambers that contain lazer towers aimed at them and battle robots they have to fist-fight with. Lastly, they come to the Blacksmith workshop where Voltron was created by the union of five planets; four of which they know to be Balto, Ariel, Earth, and Arus. This room leads to a battle with the Krelshi, leading Vince to unify the team by getting past the trial himself and joining them in the fight.
20	"Dradin, Baby, Dradin"	John Delaney	Daniel Powell story by: Todd Garfield and Jeremy Corray	March 14, 2012
Needing a vacation, the Voltron Force heads to Manset's new luxury resort, "The Leisuredrome" on the rest and relaxation planet of Dradin. But while there, ex-military soldiers from Lotor's army poised to take Dradin by force. Meanwhile, Vince wants to premiere his documentary about Voltron there. However, he and the rest of the cadets cannot go to Dradin since the invitation is for pilots only. This doesn't stop the cadets though and they decide to form "Awesometron" and sneak away to the planet.
21	"I, Voltron"	John Delaney	Henry Gilroy story by: Todd Garfield and Jeremy Corray	March 21, 2012
While awaiting Wade's conviction at his trial, Vince constructs a prototype for a mind-link interface, a way for the pilots to be better connected to Voltron's control system. However, when Daniel tries it on for size, his consciousness is accidentally transferred into Voltron and suddenly, he finds himself in Voltron's robotic body. But Wade manages to break out of his restraints and escapes the courtroom, leading Daniel to go after Wade who merges with the same cocooning Robeast that previously attacked Arus before. Now, the Voltron Force must save Daniel and return his mind to his body before it's too late.
22	"Crossed Signals"	John Delaney	Adam Beechen story by: Todd Garfield and Jeremy Corray	March 28, 2012
The Voltron Force receives a distress call from an abandoned Arusian ship from centuries past that leads them to a haunted spaceship graveyard where a swarm of bat-like Robeasts and Lotor's command Drule ship await. Meanwhile, when Keith and Allura get separated from the rest of the Force, it's up to Daniel to form Voltron and save the day with the rest of the team. Also, while on board the ghost ship, Keith learns that his ancestors are not from Earth, but from Arus, like Princess Allura, and the ship was under the command of his great-grandfather, who was a Knight of Arus.
23	"Roots of Evil"	John Delaney	Len Uhley story by: Todd Garfield and Jeremy Corray	April 4, 2012
When Maahox creates a seed filled with Haggarium, Allura comes face-to-face with the now grown treacherous tree that's taken over a farm and has to make an important decision about her future. She must choose between becoming Queen of Arus and helping her people or remain the Blue Lion pilot as a member of Voltron Force. Meanwhile, the cadets, minus Vince, battle the poisonous tree on foot, but soon Larmina finds out that Daniel is infected from the Haggarium and they keep it a secret from the team. Allura decides she needs to serve as Queen of Arus, and turns over piloting the Blue Lion officially to Larmina.
24	"The Army Of One"	John Delaney	Scott Sonneborn story by: Todd Garfield and Jeremy Corray	April 11, 2012
Maahox replicates King Lotor into a powerful army of clones who attempt to take over Planet Arus and destroy Voltron once and for all. Meanwhile, Coran has to keep the soon-to-be crowned queen, Allura busy so she won't discover her coronation surprise party. Lotor then learns Daniel has Haggarium in his body while Vince and Daniel discover they're now able to share their own powers with each other. This is discovered when the Voltron Force finds themselves battling a returning Predator Robeast, and the Boomerang Shield is not enough. Also, realizing that he serves better in the castle's defenses, Pidge hands over the Green Lion piloting duties to Vince, leaving Keith, Lance and Hunk wondering who Daniel will eventually take over for in the future.
25	"Deceive and Conquer"	John Delaney	Brandon Sawyer story by: Todd Garfield and Jeremy Corray	April 18, 2012
Voltron Force takes on a fully powered King Lotor, all while fighting a rogue spider Robeast that is able to merge itself with its foe.
26	"Black"	John Delaney	Todd Garfield story by: Todd Garfield and Jeremy Corray	April 25, 2012
It's the final battle for the Voltron Force as Castle Doom is transformed into the largest Robeast ever, attempting to destroy the Galaxy Alliance and create galactic chaos.
