= Voltron: Fleet of Doom =

1986 television film

- DVD cover
- Genre: Action/adventure, mecha
- Created by: World Events Productions; Toei Animation
- Based on: Beast King Go-Lion by Toei Animation and Armored Fleet Dairugger XV by Toei Animation
- Starring: Jack Angel; Michael Bell; Peter Cullen; Neil Ross; B.J. Ward; Lennie Weinrib
- Countries of origin: United States; Japan
- Original language: English

Production
- Running time: 46 minutes
- Production companies: World Events Productions; Toei Animation

Original release
- Network: First-run syndication (U.S.)
- Release: September 10, 1986

Related
- Voltron; Voltron: The Third Dimension

Voltron: Fleet of Doom is an American-Japanese television special involving heroes of both Voltron series working together to defeat their sworn enemy, King Zarkon, who aligns with the remnants of Emperor Zeppo's Drule Empire to create a mighty armada called the Fleet of Doom.

As both the two anime which Voltron was adapted from (Beast King GoLion and Armored Fleet Dairugger XV) never crossed over in their original forms, Toei was commissioned to create entirely original animation footage to create this movie.

The movie was released later on DVD by the company originally responsible for taking the Japanese source material and bringing it to American audiences, World Events Productions (WEP).

== Plot ==
In his attempt to destroy the Galaxy Alliance, King Zarkon allies himself with Viceroy Throk of the Drule Supreme Council to create a mighty armada known as the Fleet of Doom. To stop Zarkon and his allies, the heroes of both Voltron series must join forces to stop them before they can destroy the Alliance. But when Princess Allura is captured by Witch Haggar, Keith sets out to rescue her so that they can rejoin their friends in time to stop the Fleet of Doom from destroying the secret power base of the Galaxy Alliance.

== Cast ==
- Peter Cullen – Commander Hawkins, Coran, King Alfor, Narrator, Viceroy Throk, Hutch
- Michael Bell – Lance, Krik, Shannon, Marvin, Modok, Wolo
- Lennie Weinrib – Hunk, Prince Lotor, Cliff, Rocky
- Neil Ross – Keith, Jeff, Pidge, Chip
- B.J. Ward – Princess Allura, Haggar, Cinda, Ginger, Lisa
- Jack Angel – King Zarkon, Cossack

== Release ==
=== Home media ===
Fleet of Doom was released by WEP as an online exclusive and later was updated to have better DVD compatibility as there were many complaints about using the menu with older DVD players and that the editing was extremely poor with very long timeouts between the commercial breaks; additional trailers were also included. This updated version was made available by WEP on Amazon.com and is also still available on the Voltron store. Media Blasters released the special as a general release on July 28, 2009. This version was not part of the Voltron DVD box sets but as a stand-alone title.

In late 2010, Media Blasters announced a Blu-ray Disc release of Fleet of Doom, only to cancel it in early 2011. Nevertheless, copies of this Blu-ray edition began to become available in various internet shops as of September 2011, and it was eventually determined that these copies were genuine.

== Reception ==
"πhe Fleet of Doom crashes and burns almost immediately after launch.", wrote Darius Washington for Otaku USA Magazine.
