= Voltron: The Third Dimension =

1998 American animated series

- Genre: Action/adventure; Mecha
- Created by: World Events Productions
- Developed by: Marc Handler
- Voices of: Clancy Brown; Michael Bell; Tim Curry; Tress MacNeille; Kevin Michael Richardson; Neil Ross; B.J. Ward; Billy West
- Composer: Stephen C. Marston
- Country of origin: United States
- Original language: English
- No. of seasons: 2
- No. of episodes: 26

Production
- Executive producers: Ted Koplar; Kevin Harlan; Mike Young; John Copeland
- Producers: Jason Netter; Bill Schultz
- Editor: David W. Foster
- Running time: 25 minutes
- Production companies: Netter Digital Entertainment; Mike Young Productions; The Summit Media Group; World Events Productions

Original release
- Network: First-run syndication
- Release: September 12, 1998 – February 19, 2000

Related
- Voltron: Fleet of Doom; Voltron Force

Voltron: The Third Dimension is an American animated television series produced by World Events Productions. It is a sequel to the 1980s animated series Lion Force Voltron and is set five years after the end of the series (ignoring episodes 53 to 72.). Neil Ross, Michael Bell, and B.J. Ward reprised their roles as Keith, Lance, and Princess Allura for the series. The show was animated by Netter Digital Entertainment, inc. and Mike Young Productions. It departed from the original Voltron's animated look, as well as some character changes, such as the physical appearance of Prince Lotor (now voiced by Tim Curry, taking over the role originally voiced by Lennie Weinrib).

== Plot ==
The story takes place in the Denubian Galaxy. Shannon Muir mapped the galaxy in the 1980s as a fan and posted it online. In 1996, World Events Productions became aware of the work and made it the official starmap for the show.

From days of long ago, from uncharted regions of the universe, comes a legend. The legend of Voltron! A mighty robot — loved by good, feared by evil. As Voltron’s legend grew, peace settled across the galaxy. But then, the evil Prince Lotor escaped from his prison in deep space. He formed a secret alliance with Haggar, Mistress of Dark Magic. And together, they summoned awesome forces of fear and destruction, threatening the universe with new, horrible menaces. Voltron was needed once again. Now comes the story of a super force of space explorers, specially trained and sent by the highest echelon of the Galaxy Alliance to bring back Voltron. This is Voltron: The Third Dimension!

— Narrator during the opening sequence

With antagonist Prince Lotor's prison escape, the heroic Voltron Force re-assemble against him, but must contend simultaneously with the various monsters and warships sent by Lotor (at times, captained by him) and with opposition on their own side, represented by the artificial intelligence "Amalgamus", a sophisticated computer who objects periodically to the Voltron Force's methods.

== Cast ==
- Clancy Brown – Queeque and Igor
- Michael Bell – Lance and Coran
- Tim Curry – King Alfor and Prince Lotor
- Tress MacNeille – Lafitte
- Kevin Michael Richardson – Hunk, King Zarkon, and Narrator
- Neil Ross – Keith and Amalgamus
- B.J. Ward – Princess Allura and Haggar
- Billy West – Pidge

== Episodes ==
=== Season 1 (1998–99) ===
No. overall	No. in season	Title	Written by	Original release date
1	1	"Escape from Bastille-12"	Marc Handler	September 12, 1998
2	2	"Red Lion Breaks Loose!"	Marc Handler	September 12, 1998
3	3	"Building the Forces of Doom"	Sean Catherine Derek	October 3, 1998
4	4	"Lost Souls"	Pamela Hickey and Dennys McCoy	October 10, 1998
5	5	"A Rift in the Force"	Kelly Ward	October 31, 1998
6	6	"Shades of Gray"	Pamela Hickey and Dennys McCoy	November 7, 1998
7	7	"Bride of the Monster"	Sean Catherine Derek	November 14, 1998
8	8	"Dominus"	Pamela Hickey and Dennys McCoy	November 21, 1998
9	9	"Voltron vs. Dracotron"	Scott Guy	November 28, 1998
10	10	"Descent into Madness"	Kelly Ward	February 6, 1999
11	11	"Pidge Gets Iced"	Marc Handler	February 13, 1999
12	12	"Dark Heart"	Mark Young	February 20, 1999
13	13	"The Big Lie"	Kelly Ward	February 27, 1999
14	14	"The Trial of Voltron"	Pamela Hickey and Dennys McCoy	May 1, 1999
15	15	"The Troika Moons"	Marc Handler	May 8, 1999
16	16	"Biography: The Voltron Force"	Pamela Hickey and Dennys McCoy	May 15, 1999
17	17	"Queen Ariella"	Marc Handler	May 22, 1999

=== Season 2 (1999–2000) ===
No. overall	No. in season	Title	Written by	Original release date
18	1	"The Voltron Force Strikes Back"	Marc Handler	October 9, 1999
19	2	"Stealth Voltron"	Marc Handler	October 23, 1999
20	3	"Gladiators"	Pamela Hickey and Dennys McCoy	October 30, 1999
21	4	"Dominus Goes Home"	Scott Guy	November 6, 1999
22	5	"The Hunter"	Mark Hoffmeier	November 13, 1999
23	6	"Consider the Alternatives"	Kelly Ward	November 20, 1999
24	7	"Mind Games"	Kelly Ward	February 5, 2000
25	8	"Raid on Galaxy Garrison"	Marc Handler	February 12, 2000
26	9	"Castle Doom Dead Ahead"	Kelly Ward	February 19, 2000

== Production ==
In June 1995, it was reported World Events Productions was looking to revive Voltron with the intention of premiering a new series for Fall of 1996. Netter Digital co-produced the series with Mike Young Productions and marked the first time a CGI television series had been fully produced in the United States. Alongside Crusade, Voltron: The Third Dimension was Netter's follow-up project following the conclusion of Babylon 5.

== Awards ==
The show won a 1999 Daytime Emmy for Outstanding Sound Editing – Special Class Rick Hinson (supervising sound editor), for Elizabeth Hinson.
