= Armored Fleet Dairugger XV =

Japanese anime television series

- Official North American DVD of Armored Fleet Dairugger XV

機甲艦隊ダイラガーXV (Kikō Kantai Dairagā Fifutīn)
- Genre: Mecha
- Created by: Saburo Yatsude
- Anime television series
- Directed by: Kozo Morishita
- Produced by: Masahisa Saeki
- Written by: Keisuke Fujikawa
- Music by: Seiji Yokoyama
- Studio: Toei Animation
- Licensed by: US: Media Blasters
- Original network: MegaTON (TV Tokyo)
- Original run: March 3, 1982 – March 23, 1983
- Episodes: 56

Armored Fleet Dairugger XV (機甲艦隊ダイラガーXV(フィフティーン), Kikō Kantai Dairagā Fifutīn; "XV" read "Fifteen") is a mecha anime series aired in Japan from 1982 to 1983 for 56 episodes (52 regular episodes and four recap episodes).

In the United States, the series was heavily edited to become part of the Voltron series. The Dairugger footage was the primary source for the "Vehicle Voltron" episodes, though various footage was also inserted into the more commonly known "Lion Voltron" episodes (themselves adapted from another, unrelated Japanese series, Beast King GoLion).

== Story ==
The Rugger Team is an exploration, planetary survey, and defensive force. Planet Earth is in a time of prosperity. The Galaxy Garrison launches a mission to explore the galaxy, colonize, and build new maps of the stars. Soon after commencing the mission, the Rugger Team and their starship, the Rugger Guard, are attacked by the xenophobic Galveston Empire. The Galveston homeworld is dying and their space fleet are also on a mission of exploration and colonization. Dairugger, the super robot, must defend the Rugger Guard and its fleet as they attempt to continue their mission. When Galveston repeatedly refuses to accept peaceful coexistence, the Rugger Guard mission turns to finding the Galveston homeworld, liberating its people from their despotic Emperor, and helping them find a new planet before their world collapses.

== Characters ==
=== Dairugger pilots ===
The Rugger Team is made of three smaller teams of five members each: "Aki Team" (Air), "Keats Team" (Sea), and "Walter Team" (Land), after each team's leader. Each of the 15 parts is referred to as a "Rugger" and can combine into larger machines as separate teams called Kurugger (Air), Kairugger (Sea), and Rickrugger (Land), as well as together to form the super-robot Dairugger. The 15 separate Rugger units as well as the name come from the sport of rugby, since 15 players are required to form a rugby union team.

==== Aki Team ====
Aki Team (安芸チーム, Aki Chīmu) is the air division of the Dairugger team. Their vehicles combine to form the Kurugger (クウラガー, Kuuragā).

Manabu Aki (安芸マナブ, Aki Manabu)
Voiced by: Toshio Furukawa
Leader of the Aki Team and main pilot of Dairugger XV. Aki pilots Rugger #1, which forms Dairugger's head. His teammates address him as "Chief" (チーフ, Chīfu).
Shinobu Kai (甲斐シノブ, Kai Shinobu)
Voiced by: Ryōma Yamamoto
Pilot of Rugger #2, which forms Dairugger's upper torso.
Shota Kreutz (ショーター・クロイツ, Shōtā Kuroitsu)
Voiced by: Kōzō Shioya
Pilot of Rugger #3, which forms Dairugger's right shoulder and bicep. Shota is from the planet Sala (サラ星, Sara-sei).
Yasuo Mutsu (陸奥ヤスオ, Mutsu Yasuo)
Voiced by: Satomi Majima
Pilot of Rugger #4, which forms Dairugger's left shoulder and bicep. Mutsu is the youngest member of the Dairugger team.
Patty Ellington (パティ・エリントン, Pati Erinton)
Voiced by: Keiko Han
Female pilot of Rugger #5, which forms Daiugger's chest.

==== Keats Team ====
Keats Team (キーツチーム, Kītsu Chīmu) is the sea division of the Dairugger team. Their vehicles combine to form the Kairugger (カイラガー, Kairagā).

Miranda Keats (ミランダ・キーツ, Miranda Kītsu)
Voiced by: Hideyuki Hori
Leader of the Keats Team and pilot of Rugger #6, which forms Dairugger's mid-torso. A native of the planet Mira (ミラ星, Mira-sei), Keats is gifted with precognitive abilities that warn him of incoming threats.
Haruka Kaga (加賀ハルカ, Kaga Haruka)
Voiced by: Harumi Iizuka
Female pilot of Rugger #7, which forms Dairugger's right thigh. She is close friends with Aki and Mutsu.
Saluta Katz (サルタ・カッツ, Saruta Kattsu)
Voiced by: Masaharu Satō
Pilot of Rugger #8, which forms Dairugger's left thigh. Like Shota, Saluta is from the planet Sala.
Tatsuo Izumo (出雲タツオ, Izumo Tatsuo)
Voiced by: Shō Hayami
Pilot of Rugger #9, which forms Dairugger's right shin.
Barros Kalateja (バーロス・カラテヤ, Bārosu Karateya)
Voiced by: Ken Yamaguchi
Pilot of Rugger #10, which forms Dairugger's left shin.

==== Walter Team ====
Walter Team (ワルターチーム, Warutā Chīmu) is the land division of the Dairugger team. Their vehicles combine to form the Rickrugger (リックラガー, Rikkuragā).

Walter Jack (ワルター・ジャック, Warutā Jakku)
Voiced by: Katsuji Mori
Leader of the Walter Team and pilot of Rugger #11, which forms Dairugger's waist.
Moya Kirigas (モーヤ・キリガッス, Mōya Kirigassu)
Voiced by: Nana Yamaguchi
Female pilot of Rugger #12, which forms Dairugger's right forearm. Like Keats, Moya is from the planet Mira.
Mack Chucker (マック・チャッカー, Makku Chakkā)
Voiced by: Banjō Ginga
Pilot of Rugger #13, which forms Dairugger's left forearm.
Tasuku Izu (伊豆タスク, Izu Tasuku)
Voiced by: Shingo Hiromori
Pilot of Rugger #14, which forms Dairugger's right foot.
Kazuto Nagato (長門カズト, Nagato Kazuto)
Voiced by: Hiroshi Ōtake
Pilot of Rugger #15, which forms Dairugger's left foot.

=== Galaxy Garrison ===
Galaxy Garrison (銀河警備軍, Ginga Keibi-gun) is a planetary union of Earth, Sala, and Mira.

Shinji Ise (伊勢シンジ, Ise Shinji)
Voiced by: Hideyuki Tanaka
Second-in-command of the Rugger Guard (ラガーガード, Ragā Gādo). He is the first member of Galaxy Garrison to establish diplomatic negotiations with the Galveston Empire through Captain Drake. By episode 17, Ise becomes the captain of the Rugger Guard after Dick Asimov is reassigned to Earth.
Dick Asimov (ティック・アシモフ, Dikku Ashimofu)
Voiced by: Kōji Yada
Captain of the Rugger Guard. In episode 17, Asimov is reassigned to become Supreme Commander Dewa's aide-de-camp on Earth. In episode 33, he is commissioned as the commander of the Three Allied Planets fleet to attack planet Galveston. In episode 43, Asimov holds peace talks with Teles on the Number 3 Planet of the Number 37 Star System and offers to give the Galveston Empire full ownership of the planet on the conditions that the empire cease their aspirations of global conquest, that they leave the planet's indigenous human population in peace, and that they disarm their military. The negotiation falls through due to Supreme Commander Caponero's insistence of driving out the indigenous population. Teles leaves the planet, but Asimov has a small fleet stay to protect the inhabitants from an attack by Galveston. Asimov leads the Alliance to successfully invade planet Galveston. After the fall of the Galveston Empire in episode 52, Asimov informs Tess Socrat that the surviving citizens will be migrated to the Number 3 Planet.
Supreme Commander Dewa (出羽総司令, Dewa Sō Shirei)
Voiced by: Hiroshi Ōtake
Commander of the Galaxy Garrison's space fortress. In episode 22, Dewa sends a fleet led by Commander Date to rendezvous with the Rugger Guard on Planet K and prepare for an all-out war with the Galveston Empire.
Dr. Search (ドクター・サーチ, Dokutā Sāchi)
Voiced by: Kōji Totani
The Rugger Guard's doctor and head of the Research Department.
Commander Date (伊達司令, Date Shirei)
Voiced by:
Dewa's second-in-command. Date leads a fleet as part of the Galaxy Garrison's war with the Galveston Empire. In episode 32, he and his crew sacrifice themselves by ramming their ship towards the Galveston Frontline Command's hangar doors to help the Dairugger team escape from the base's destruction.
Commander Hagi (萩司令, Hagi Shirei)
Voiced by:
High Commander Wakasa (若狭長官, Wakasa Chōkan)
Voiced by: Masaharu Satō
Director of Galaxy Garrison.
Yamamoto (山本)
Voiced by:
A Galaxy Garrison officer under Commander Date. In episode 31, Yamamoto offers to command a ship on a suicide mission through the mine-laden asteroid belt to clear a path towards the Galveston Frontline Command.
Morikawa (森川) and Sato (佐藤, Satō)
Voiced by: Kōzō Shioya
Two Galaxy Garrison officers stationed at the Number 3 Planet of the Number 37 Star System in episode 45. When Morikawa is wounded during Commander Zucca's invasion, Aki fends off the invaders while Morikawa and Sato run to safety. They are both killed by Galveston forces after finding a cave for shelter.

=== Galveston Empire ===
The Galveston Empire (ガルベストン帝国, Garubesuton Teikoku) is an advanced alien civilization in search for planets to colonize, as their home planet is rapidly dying from depletion of its natural resources and the deterioration of its Van Allen radiation belt. Aside from a massive fleet of spaceships, the empire is equipped with mechanized Battle Machines (バトルマシン, Batoru Mashin) and Battle Attackers (バトルアタッカー, Batoru Atakkā). The Galveston Empire is named after Galveston Island, a barrier island in Texas with a history of piracy.

Commander Teles Socrat (ソクラット・テレス司令, Sokratto Teresu Shirei)
Voiced by: Kōji Totani
Commander of the Galveston Empire's Frontline Command. While the Galveston Empire starts the war with the Rugger Guard, Teles believes that both factions should explore the galaxy together. In episode 22, he is relieved of his duty by Commander Luciano and sent back to planet Galveston to become Garrison Commander. Upon his return to the planet, Teles is reassigned as Frontline Exploration Base Commander. Shortly after the destruction of Frontline Command, he is given new orders to attack and destroy the Earth fleet. Teles defies these orders and pursues a ceasefire with Galaxy Garrison. In episode 43, he meets with Captain Asimov to negotiate peace talks over the Number 3 Planet of the Number 37 Star System. The negotiations, however, fall through, due to the Supreme Command's insistence of taking the planet by force. He is then dismissed and placed on house arrest upon returning to Galveston. With the aid of Sirk, Teles is freed from captivity to lead the resistance forces against the government. In episode 51, the resistance succeeds after Emperor Corsair is killed during the uprising. While leading his people to evacuate the dying planet in episode 52, Teles is assassinated by three soldiers who blame him and the government for the planet's destruction. Teles is named after Teles of Megara, a Cynic philosopher from Ancient Greece.
Sirk (サーク, Sāku)
Voiced by: Satomi Majima
A female member of the Galveston Royal Guard who is assigned as Teles' adjutant upon his return to the planet Galveston. Following Teles' house arrest on episode 47, Sirk is abducted by a guerrilla faction, who asks her to join their quest to overthrow Emperor Corsair. She collaborates with the guerrilla faction to free Teles from his house arrest. Following Teles' death at the hands of three assassins in episode 52, the Dairugger team urges Sirk to carry on his will to rebuild Galveston.
General Caponello (カポネーロ総司令, Kaponēro Sō Shirei)
Voiced by: Banjō Ginga
General commander of the Galveston Empire. Ignoring the deteriorating state of his planet, Caponello oversees the attacks on Galaxy Garrison to ensure Galveston's dominance in the galaxy. Once the Three Planets Alliance invades the planet, Caponello retreats to the palace and urges Emperor Corsair to migrate to another planet, but Corsair refuses the offer. Caponello, Gomez, and Ventura pilot a Battle Attacker in an attempt to escape from the Alliance, but are intercepted and destroyed by Dairugger. Caponello is named after the American gangster Al Capone.
Tess Socrat (ソクラット・テス, Sokuratto Tesu)
Voiced by: Eiji Kanie
Teles' father and Internal Secretary of the Galveston Empire. The Galveston supreme command holds Tess responsible for the ongoing riots in the country and dismisses him of his position upon Teles' return. In episode 34, upon his reinstatement in the government, he urges Teles to follow Emperor Corsair's orders to destroy the Earth fleet. By episode 51, Tess sides with his son and the resistance forces against the government. Once the empire falls, Tess offers to meet with Captain Asimov to negotiate the safe migration of his people to a new planet. Tess Socrat is named after the Greek philosopher Socrates.
Emperor Corsair (コルセール帝, Korusēru Tei)
Voiced by: Kazuhiko Kishino
Emperor of the Galveston Empire. When planet Galveston's defenses fall to the Three Planets Alliance in episode 51, Corsair refuses to leave the planet despite Caponello's pleas to do so and the resistance close to overthrowing the government. Corsair meets his fate by a stray shot from one of his fallen commanders.
Science Secretary Gomez (ゴメス科学長官, Gomesu Kagaku Chōkan)
Voiced by:
Science secretary of the Galveston Empire. He is killed alongside Caponello and Ventura by Dairugger in episode 51.
Raucher (ローチャー, Rōchā)
Voiced by:
A Galveston commander sent as reinforcement to Teles' fleet in episode 34. Raucher and his crew are immediately at odds with Teles' pacifistic approach to the Galaxy Garrison. In episode 36, Teles has Raucher negotiate a ceasefire with the Rugger Guard, but Raucher uses the negotiation to ambush the fleet. His plans, however, are thwarted by Dairugger. In episode 44, Raucher becomes Frontline Exploration Base Commander after Teles is dismissed for attempting to make peaceful negotiations with Galaxy Garrison. During the fall of the Exploration Base in episode 46, Raucher commandeers a Battle Attacker in a last-ditch effort to wipe out the Three Planets Alliance fleet, but is ultimately killed by Dairugger.
Commander Luciano (ルチアーノ司令, Ruchiāno Shirei)
Voiced by: Masaharu Satō
Second-in-command of the Galveston Empire's Frontline Command. In episode 22, Luciano replaces Teles as Frontline Commander with the intent of wiping out Earth from the galaxy. He is killed after the Aki and Keats teams detonate bombs in the Frontline Command's power source. Luciano is named after Italian-American mobster Lucky Luciano.
Jackson (ジャクソン, Jakuson), Huddler (ハドラー, Hadorā), McKenny (マッケニー, Makkenī), and Beltran (ベルトラン, Berutran)
Raucher's subordinates. In episode 42, Jackson's fleet lands on the Number 3 Planet of the Number 37 Star System in response to Gallo evacuating the planet upon the Earth fleet's arrival. He defies Teles' orders and proceeds to advance towards the Earth fleet before Nolan arrives and stops him in time for peace talks. In episode 43, when the negotiation falls through and Teles has his fleets leave the planet, Raucher has Jackson return and attack the Earth fleet protecting the planet. Jackson's fleet is wiped out by the Earth forces.
Ruckall (ラッカル, Rakkaru)
Voiced by: Banjō Ginga
A Galveston commander who attacks the Rugger Guard during a planetary exploration in episodes 1–3. He is killed when the planet explodes from the Frontline Command's photon missile bombardment. The Rugger Guard crew posthumously names the planet Achilles (アキレウス, Akireus).
Sim (シム, Shimu)
Voiced by: Kaneto Shiozawa
A Galveston infantry pilot. In episode 11, he is involved in a mid-air collision during training and crash lands near the vicinity of the Rugger Guard. Ise does not take Sim as a prisoner of war, but welcomes him as a guest of the ship. Izumo initially shows hostility towards Sim, but they shortly become friends. Once the Rugger Guard crew repairs Sim's ship, he bids them farewell and heads back to the Galveston fleet, only to be shot down and killed by Lafitte. In episode 52, Sim's younger brother is one of the three soldiers who assassinates Teles.
Captain Drake (ドレイク隊長, Doreiku Taichō)
Voiced by: Ryōma Yamamoto
A Galveston captain loyal to Teles. In episode 15, Drake establishes diplomatic communication with Ise. When Teles is relieved of his duty as Frontline Commander, Drake is torn between following the Galveston Higher Command's orders and fulfilling Teles' wish of coexistence between Earth and Galveston. In episode 23, Drake's fleet attacks Commander Date' fleet, but he is killed after his entire fleet is wiped out in the battle. Drake is named after Francis Drake, an English privateer who carried out the second circumnavigation of Earth in a single expedition.
Roche (ロッシェ, Rosshe)
Voiced by: Masaharu Satō
Drake's second-in-command. He is killed alongside Drake in episode 22 while battling Date's fleet. Roche is named after Roche Braziliano, a Dutch pirate who operated in Brazil and Jamaica during the mid-17th century.
Captain Lafitte (ラフィット隊長, Rafitto Taichō)
Voiced by: Ikuya Sawaki
A Galveston captain who only believes in the superiority of his race. In episode 7, he leads the Fleet patrolling/investigating Zone Violet. In episode 16, Lafitte participates in the mutiny led by Captain Barataria, but he surrenders after Barataria takes his own life. Despite Lafitte's treason, Teles is ordered by the Supreme Command to release him and reinstate him as the commander of the Galveston Expeditionary Fleet. Lafitte abuses his position by interfering with other captains' involvement with the Rugger Guard and destroying the Galaxy Garrison's base on Planet K. In episode 22, his fleet conquers Planet K after forcing the Rugger Guard to retreat in a lengthy space naval battle. The Rugger Team launches a counterattack in episode 23, forcing Lafitte to withdraw from the planet. In episode 27, Lafitte's fleet attacks the Galaxy Garrison's Space Fortress, but is killed when the Space Fortress launches a fierce counterattack after destroying the fleet's Battle Machine. Lafitte is named after Jean Lafitte, a French pirate who operated in the Gulf of Mexico during the early 19th century.
Captain Barataria (バラタリア隊長, Barataria Taichō)
Voiced by: Masaharu Satō
A Galveston captain who disagrees with Teles' handling of the conflict with the Rugger Guard. In episode 16, Barataria and Lafitte stage a mutiny against Teles, which ends in failure. Rather than surrender to Teles, Barataria shoots himself in the head while Lafitte and the surviving mutineers are arrested. Barataria is named after Barataria Bay, a bay in Louisiana known for being Jean Lafitte's base during the early 19th century.
Captain Marius (マリエス隊長, Mariesu Taichō)
Voiced by:
A Galveston captain loyal to Teles. In episode 18, Marius leads his fleet in a joint planetary expedition with the Rugger Guard, but he is forced by Lafitte to break the alliance and destroy the planet's forestry to make room for a Galveston base. Marius is named after Simon Marius, the German astronomer who discovered the four major moons of Jupiter before Galileo Galilei.
Charch (チャーチ, Chāchi)
Voiced by:
A Galveston commander who lures the Rugger Guard into a trap on a planet with inadequate oxygen in episode 26. His plan backfires when the affected Walter Team members regain consciousness and Dairugger is formed to fight his fleet's Battle Machine. When his fleet is wiped out, he attempts a Kamikaze run on the Rugger Guard, but his flagship is destroyed by Dairugger.
Sheela (シーラ, Shīra)
Voiced by:
A Galveston commander who holds the male population of the planet Eldora captive in his underground base in episode 28. When Dairugger appears on the planet, the Eldorans stage an uprising and kill Sheela.
Ducas (ドゥーカス, Dūkasu)
Voiced by:
A Galveston commander who leads the Earth invasion fleet. In episode 30, he successfully penetrates Earth's defenses and bombards Galaxy Garrison's capital city, despite his fleet sustaining heavy losses. Upon his retreat to the Frontline Command, Ducas defies Luciano's orders and decides to attack the Earth fleet from behind, only to be killed by Dairugger. Ducas is named after Doukas, the family of noble Byzantine Greeks who ruled the Byzantine Empire in the 9th–11th centuries.
Blanc (ブランク, Buranku)
Voiced by:
A Galveston commander of the expeditionary fleet at Sector NS71. In episode 33, Blanc's fleet attacks the Rugger Guard on a planet within the sector, but is wiped out by the incoming Three Planets Alliance fleet.
Emma (エンマ, Enma)
Voiced by: Hiromi Tsuru
Raucher's female subordinate. In episode 38, after failing to destroy Dairugger on Planet J, Emma is ordered by Raucher to intercept the Rugger Guard on Planet 58 at all costs. Her plan to lure the Dairugger team through a narrow valley goes wrong when she is injured by a swarm of the planet's birds and captured by Aki Team. Emma promptly escapes from the Rugger Guard and returns to her fleet. Despite her injuries, she defies Teles' orders to retreat and proceeds to attack the Earth fleet, only to see her fleet wiped out before she is killed in a failed kamikaze run on the Rugger Guard.
Sams (サムス, Samusu)
Voiced by: Hiroshi Ōtake
Emma's adjutant. In episode 38, Sams is briefly forced to command Emma's fleet after she is injured during a scouting run on Planet 58 and captured by Aki Team. He is killed alongside Emma during a naval battle with the Rugger Guard.
Antonov (アントノフ, Antonofu)
Voiced by: Kaneto Shiozawa
A Galveston military officer stationed at the Number 21 Star System supply base. In episode 39, after the Rugger Guard attacks and captures the base, Antonov is held prisoner along with his comrades, but he offers to play a game of rugby with the Earth officers until Danton's fleet arrives to retake the base. During the battle, Antonov is torn between peace with the Earth forces and his loyalty to the empire until he sees Danton's forces indiscriminately massacring his comrades. While trying to retrieve the rugby ball, he is killed by Danton's Battle Attacker during its fight with Dairugger.
Danton (ダントク)
Voiced by:
A Galveston captain who is ordered by Teles to set course for the unexplored sector near the Number 21 Star System supply base, but decides to take Raucher's orders to recapture the base from the Earth fleet. During the assault, Danton is killed by Dairugger while his fleet is wiped out by the Rugger Guard.
Gallo (ガーロ, Gāro)
Voiced by:
A Galveston commander whose exploration fleet discovers a habitable planet in the form of the Number 3 Planet of the Number 37 Star System in episode 41. He orders his fleet to leave the planet upon the presence of the Dairugger team. Despite his fleet's efforts to destroy their research information, the Dairugger team acquires vital exploration data from the abandoned base.
Nolan (ノーラン, Nōran)
Voiced by: Masaharu Satō
A Galveston commander, that leads the Fleet patrolling/investigating Zone Yellow. He is sent by Teles to the Number 3 Planet to open peace talks with the Earth fleet in episodes 42–43. He arrives and stops Jackson from attacking the Rugger Guard before discussing with Ise on a meeting between Asimov and Teles.
Ziegrone (ジーグローネ, Jīgurōne)
Voiced by: Masaharu Satō
A Galveston commander sent by Caponello to dismiss Teles as the Frontline Exploration Base Commander and hand the position to Raucher.
Zucca (ズッカ, Zukka)
Voiced by: Ken Yamaguchi
A Galveston commander who leads an assault on the Number 3 Planet on episode 45. After destroying Galaxy Garrison's base, Zucca is killed by Dairugger.
Gurrey (ガーレー, Gārē)
Voiced by:
A Galveston commander stationed on the Number 11 Planet of the Galveston System. In episode 46, Caponello instructs Garrey to wipe out the invading Three Planets Alliance fleet with the Space Impulse, a series of missiles with anti-radar coating. The Alliance manages to destroy the stealth missiles by using their searchlights to spot them.
Holtes (ホルテス, Horutesu)
Voiced by:
A Galveston commander assigned by Caponello to man the final line of defense against the approaching Three Planets Alliance fleet in episode 49. Holtes turns down Caponello's offer to send him two Battle Attackers, as he feels offended that his defensive fleet is thought to be unreliable. The fleet, however, is low on resources and poorly equipped. Holtes' fleet is wiped out during the battle and he goes down with his base from Dairugger's Miracle Beam.
Loran (ロラン, Roran)
Voiced by: Banjō Ginga
In episode 7, he leads the Fleet patrolling/investigating Zone Silver.
Gramont (グラモン, Guramon)
Voiced by: Banjō Ginga
In episode 7, he leads the Fleet patrolling/investigating Zone Black.

=== Others ===
Zuno (ズノ)
Voiced by:
Queen of the planet Eldora (エルドラ, Erudora-sei) in episode 27. The female Eldorans are extremely distrustful of outsiders and initially mistake the Dairugger Team as members of the Galveston Empire, which have taken the planet's male population hostage. Aki attempts to open diplomatic relations with Zuno, hoping to form an alliance with the Eldorans. Commander Dorn, however, tricks Zuno into thinking the Dairugger Team is one of theirs, resulting in the Eldorans fighting the Dairugger Team while Dorn launches a Battle Machine to kill Zuno. When Dairugger and the Rugger Guard wipe out Dorn's fleet, a critically injured Zuno realizes Earth's true intent and reveals the location of Galveston's Frontline Base to Aki before she dies.
Darl (ダール, Dāru)
Voiced by:
Leader of a technologically advanced humanoid tribe on Planet J in episode 37. Darl's tribe captures the Kurugger and interrogates Aki, learning that the Dairugger team is not a hostile threat like the Galveston Empire. The Aki Team discovers that the tribe previously lived on a planet with a red moon that the Rugger Guard recently explored. It is revealed that the tribe fled the planet and limited their use of technology after rendering the planet uninhabitable from years of nuclear testing. After Dairugger defeats a Battle Attacker launched by Emma's fleet, Darl forms an alliance with the Rugger Guard and pledges to support the fleet in their war against the Galveston Empire.
Denon (デノン)
Voiced by: Satomi Majima
A boy that Walter Team encounters on Planet 71 in episode 40. When Denon falls off a waterfall while carrying a fawn, Izu and Nagato save them from drowning before they run away, leading Walter Team to the planet's inhabitants. Walter Team learns that the inhabitants are of the same race as Darl's tribe on Planet J. When Butler's fleet attacks the planet, Denon helplessly watches his fawn get killed by a Battle Attacker. Just as Dairugger is on the losing end of the battle, Denon's adult elk climbs up the Battle Attacker and rams its front monitor before falling to its death, allowing Dairugger to destroy the Battle Attacker.
Bakki (バッキ)
Voiced by:
Leader of the anti-government guerrilla faction on planet Galveston. He also acts as a spy, working as a palace servant.

== Dairugger specifications ==
Dairugger is made of 15 vehicle parts, and is 60 meters (200 ft) tall. The command line to combine the Rugger Machines is "Dairugger Fighting Formation On!" (ダイラガーファイティングフォーメーション オン!, Dairagā Faitingu Fōmēshon On!).

Weapons

- Dairugger Sword (ダイラガー・スウォード, Dairagā Suwōdo)
- Dairugger Lancer (ダイラガーランサー, Dairagā Lansā)
- Shot Arrow (ショットアロー, Shotto Arō)
- Dairugger Kilders (ダイラガーキルダー, Dairagā Kirudā)
  - Spin Cutters (スピンカッター, Supin Kattā)
  - Dairugger Typhoon (ダイラガータイフーン, Dairagā Taifūn)
- Electromagnetic Whip (電磁ビュート, Denji Byūto)
- Beam Attacks
  - Rugger Beam (ラガービーム, Ragā Bīmu)
  - Wing Beam (ウィングビーム, Uingu Bīmu)
  - Dairugger Miracle Power (ダイラガーミラクルパワー, Dairagā Mirakuru Pawā)

== Episodes ==
The series' opening theme is "Ginga no Seishun" (銀河の青春; "Galactic Youths") and the ending theme is "Ai wo Tsutaeru Tabi" (愛をつたえる旅; "A Journey to Give Love"); both songs are performed by Koichi Kawazu.

No.	Title	Directed by	Written by	Original release date
1	"Galactic Clash"; Transliteration: "Gekitotsu suru Ginga" (Japanese: 激突する銀河)	Kozo Morishita	Keisuke Fujikawa	March 3, 1982
Six months into her mission to map the galaxy, the Rugger Guard reaches the eighth potential planet on her mission and launches the Rugger teams to explore it for possible colonization. Just as her crew sets up a base on the planet, the Rugger Guard is attacked by a fleet of the Galveston Empire. Aki and the Rugger teams' fresh combat training is put to the test when the Galveston fleet launches a Battle Machine during the assault.
2	"The Isolated Regiment"; Transliteration: "Kodokuna Shubi-tai" (Japanese: 孤独な守備隊)	Directed by : Masao Ito; Storyboarded by : Kazunori Tanahashi	Keisuke Fujikawa	March 10, 1982
Following his defeat at the hands of the Rugger Guard, Ruckall is ordered by Teles to leave the Earth fleet alone. However, he goes against orders and launches another attack on the Rugger Guard and her fleet.
3	"Farewell, Achilles"; Transliteration: "Saraba Akireusu" (Japanese: さらばアキレウス)	Shigeyasu Yamauchi	Keisuke Fujikawa	March 17, 1982
Ruckall is given one last chance to redeem himself by giving the Rugger Guard an ultimatum to leave the planet or face total annihilation.
4	"Rescue Mission to Hell"; Transliteration: "Jigoku e no Kyūjo Meirei" (Japanese: 地獄への救助命令)	Akinori Orai	Keisuke Fujikawa	March 24, 1982
Drake attempts to wipe out the Rugger Guard by sending a false distress signal and luring her into a black hole system.
5	"Battle for the Experimental Planet"; Transliteration: "Jikken Wakusei no Kōbō" (Japanese: 実験惑星の攻防)	Takenori Kawada	Keisuke Fujikawa	March 31, 1982
Following a brief skirmish with Drake's forces, Walter Team lands on an uninhabitable planet, only to discover that the Galveston Empire has begun to terraform it.
6	"Trapped by the Meteor Shower"; Transliteration: "Ryūseiu ni Chire" (Japanese: 流星雨に散れ)	Directed by : Katsumi Minoguchi; Storyboarded by : Kazunori Tanahashi	Keisuke Fujikawa	April 7, 1982
The Rugger Guard is heavily damaged from traveling through a meteor shower, leaving her open to an attack by Drake's fleet.
7	"Obliteration of the Reinforcement Fleet"; Transliteration: "Kyūen Kantai Zenmetsu" (Japanese: 救援艦隊全滅)	Akinori Orai	Keisuke Fujikawa	April 14, 1982
As Drake's fleet once again attacks the Rugger Guard at an asteroid field, a reinforcement fleet of Sala and Mira ships intercept them to buy time for the Rugger Guard to complete her repairs. The Dairugger team defiantly sorties to assist the reinforcement fleet when a Battle Machine is launched.
8	"Ghosts of the Binary System"; Transliteration: "Nirensei no Bōrei" (Japanese: 二連星の亡霊)	Directed by : Masao Ito; Storyboarded by : Shigeyasu Yamauchi	Keisuke Fujikawa	April 21, 1982
The Rugger Guard arrives on a new planet in the Binary System and encounters a fleet of decaying Galveston ships. She lands on the sea, unaware that the water contains corrosive microbes that eat away the ship's hull.
9	"The Glorious Suicide Corps"; Transliteration: "Eikō no Kesshi-tai" (Japanese: 栄光の決死隊)	Katsumi Minoguchi	Keisuke Fujikawa	April 28, 1982
Upon landing on the fourth planet in the system, the Rugger Guard crew take a break and enjoy the lake while waiting for the Sala and Mira reinforcement fleets to arrive. However, the reinforcements are attacked by Drake's fleet while Gramont prepares to ambush the Rugger Guard.
10	"Sneak Attack on the Space Fortress"; Transliteration: "Uchū Yōsai Kishū Saru" (Japanese: 宇宙要塞奇襲さる)	Takenori Kawada	Keisuke Fujikawa	May 5, 1982
The Dairugger team explores a planet with an abandoned city when Chucker is suddenly stricken with an illness. Meanwhile, Drake stages a surprise attack on the Galaxy Garrison Space Fortress.
11	"A Momentary Truce"; Transliteration: "Tsukanoma no Kyūsen" (Japanese: つかの間の休戦)	Kozo Morishita	Keisuke Fujikawa	May 12, 1982
When a Galveston soldier crash lands near the Rugger Guard, Ise has him taken in as a guest rather than a prisoner of war, much to the dismay of the Dairugger team.
12	"Legend of the Space Forest"; Transliteration: "Uchū no Jukai Densetsu" (Japanese: 宇宙の樹海伝説)	Akinori Orai	Keisuke Fujikawa	May 19, 1982
After the Dairugger team explores a planet with an abandoned village, Kreuz stays behind for a while, as the forest reminds him of a childhood experience, but he is caught off-guard by an earthquake and a Battle Machine.
13	"The Enemy Within the Mind"; Transliteration: "Kokoro no Naka no Teki" (Japanese: 心のなかの敵)	Katsumi Minoguchi	Keisuke Fujikawa	May 26, 1982
Aki Team explores a planet and encounters Lafitte's fleet, which has been damaged by the lightning storm. Once the Rugger Guard lands in front of the fleet for repairs, a misunderstanding occurs when Lafitte has his fleet leave the planet and the Dairugger team assumes combat formation.
14	"The Earth Fleet's Counterattack"; Transliteration: "Hangeki Chikyū Kantai" (Japanese: 反撃・地球艦隊)	Shigeyasu Yamauchi	Keisuke Fujikawa	June 2, 1982
The Rugger Guard lands on the No. 5 planet of the No. 6 star system to watch a comet pass by, unaware that it is a reconnaissance ship sent by Lafitte. Teles orders Drake to attack the approaching Earth support fleet while Lafitte ambushes the Rugger Guard.
15	"Breakdown of the Space Talks"; Transliteration: "Uchū Kaidan Ketsuretsu" (Japanese: 宇宙会談決裂)	Kozo Morishita	Keisuke Fujikawa	June 9, 1982
Ise begins peace negotiations with Drake, but Lafitte prepares an attack on the Earth fleet.
16	"The Two Rebellions"; Transliteration: "Futatsu no Hangyaku" (Japanese: 二つの反逆)	Takenori Kawada	Keisuke Fujikawa	June 16, 1982
Feeling distrust over Teles' pacifistic approach to Galaxy Garrison, Barataria and Lafitte stage a mutiny to take over the Galveston Frontline Command.
17	"Orders For Asimov's Return"; Transliteration: "Ashimofu Kikan Meirei" (Japanese: アシモフ帰還命令)	Akinori Orai	Keisuke Fujikawa	June 23, 1982
Asimov is ordered back to Earth, giving Ise command of the Rugger Guard.
18	"A Touch and Go Situation"; Transliteration: "Isshoku Sokuhatsu" (Japanese: 一触即発)	Katsumi Minoguchi	Keisuke Fujikawa	June 30, 1982
The Rugger Guard and Marius' fleet stage a joint exploration on a planet inhabited by dinosaurs, but the partnership ends when Lafitte orders Marius to withdraw his forces and start razing the forests to make room for a Galveston frontline base.
19	"Red Moon Rising"; Transliteration: "Akai Tsuki ga Noboru" (Japanese: 赤い月が昇る)	Kozo Morishita	Keisuke Fujikawa	July 7, 1982
The Rugger Guard arrives on Planet K, where the Rugger team discovers the remains of a lost civilization. As the crew prepares to construct a frontline base, the Rugger team is ambushed by a Battle Machine at an abandoned airport.
20	"Desperate Struggle for Planet K"; Transliteration: "Wakusei K no Shitō" (Japanese: 惑星Kの死闘)	Directed by : Katsumi Minoguchi; Storyboarded by : Masamune Ochiai	Keisuke Fujikawa	July 14, 1982
Lafitte launches a vicious attack on the Galaxy Garrison base on Planet K.
21	"Arise, Galaxy Garrison"; Transliteration: "Tate, Ginga Keibi-gun" (Japanese: 立て、銀河警備軍)	Takenori Kawada	Keisuke Fujikawa	July 21, 1982
Despite the heavy casualties from the destruction of the logistics base on Planet K, Galaxy Garrison keeps the general public unaware of the attack, causing a division among the generals over staging a counterattack on Galveston's forces.
22	"Ex-Commander Teles"; Transliteration: "Teresu Shirei Shikkyaku" (Japanese: テレス司令失脚)	Directed by : Masao Ito; Storyboarded by : Shigeyasu Yamauchi	Keisuke Fujikawa	July 28, 1982
Commander Luciano arrives to dismiss Teles from his position in Frontline Command.
23	"The Mission to Take Back Planet K"; Transliteration: "Wakusei K Dakkan Sakusen" (Japanese: 惑星K奪還作戦)	Masamune Ochiai	Keisuke Fujikawa	August 4, 1982
On its way to rendezvous with the Rugger Guard, the Galaxy Garrison reinforcement fleet engages in a space naval battle with Drake's fleet.
24	"Riot on Galveston"; Transliteration: "Bōdō Garubesuton" (Japanese: 暴動・ガルベストン)	Directed by : Masao Ito; Storyboarded by : Akira Yahiro	Keisuke Fujikawa	August 11, 1982
Teles returns to the planet Galveston, only to see his people extremely disgruntled over the rapidly deteriorating condition of his homeworld and the government's violent approach to the ongoing riots.
25	"Bitter Struggle on the Planet of Light"; Transliteration: "Kōbō Wakusei no Kutō" (Japanese: 光芒惑星の苦闘)	Masamune Ochiai	Keisuke Fujikawa	August 18, 1982
26	"The Snare of the Hell Planet"; Transliteration: "Jigoku Wakusei no Wana" (Japanese: 地獄惑星の罠)	Takashi Hisaoka	Keisuke Fujikawa	August 25, 1982
27	"Storming the Space Fortress"; Transliteration: "Uchū Yōsai Kōryaku" (Japanese: 宇宙要塞攻略)	Takanori Kawada	Keisuke Fujikawa	September 1, 1982
28	"Eldora's Plea"; Transliteration: "Erudora no Higan" (Japanese: エルドラの悲願)	Directed by : Masao Ito; Storyboarded by : Akira Yahiro	Keisuke Fujikawa	September 8, 1982
The Dairugger team arrives on the planet Eldora and is met with hostility from Queen Zuno and her all-female army.
29	"Uprising of the Space Fort"; Transliteration: "Uchū Toride no Hanran" (Japanese: 宇宙砦の反乱)	Masamune Ochiai	Keisuke Fujikawa	September 15, 1982
On her route towards the Galveston System, the Rugger Guard approaches a planet run by Commander Sheela, who has the planet Eldora's male population enslaved.
30	"Earth's State of Emergency"; Transliteration: "Chikyū Hijō Jitai" (Japanese: 地球非常事態)	Kozo Morishita	Shigemitsu Taguchi	September 22, 1982
Lafitte's fleet stages an all-out attack on Earth, with Galaxy Garrison caught off-guard.
31	"Locate the Enemy Headquarters"; Transliteration: "Teki Shirei-bu o Sagase" (Japanese: 敵司令部を探せ)	Takashi Hisaoka	Keisuke Fujikawa	September 29, 1982
32	"Destruction of the Front Line Base"; Transliteration: "Zensen Kichi Gekiha" (Japanese: 前線基地撃破)	Masamune Ochiai	Keisuke Fujikawa	October 6, 1982
The Three Planets Alliance stages a full assault on the Galveston Frontline Command, with the Aki and Keats Teams storming through the base to plant bombs in the central power system.
33	"The New Allied Fleet to the Rescue"; Transliteration: "Shin Rengō Kantai Raien" (Japanese: 新連合艦隊来援)	Takenori Kawada	Shigemitsu Taguchi	October 13, 1982
34	"Planet of the Burning Cave"; Transliteration: "Moeru Kūdō Wakusei" (Japanese: 燃える空洞惑星)	Masao Ito	Keisuke Fujikawa	October 20, 1982
35	"Get Yourself Together, Mutsu"; Transliteration: "Mutsu yo Tachinaore" (Japanese: 陸奥よ立ち直れ)	Shigeyasu Yamauchi	Shigemitsu Taguchi	October 27, 1982
Mutsu loses his confidence when he does not receive a letter from his mother in the mail delivered to the Rugger Guard.
36	"A Desperate Undersea Combining"; Transliteration: "Hisshi no Kaichū Gattai" (Japanese: 必死の海中合体)	Directed by : Makoto Nagao; Storyboarded by : Masamune Ochiai	Shigemitsu Taguchi	November 3, 1982
37	"Air Rugger Vanishes"; Transliteration: "Kieta Kū Ragā" (Japanese: 消えたクウ・ラガー)	Kozo Morishita	Keisuke Fujikawa	November 10, 1982
While exploring a new planet, Aki Team is captured by its inhabitants, who appear primitive but have highly advanced technology.
38	"Emma, the Female Captain"; Transliteration: "On'na Taichō Enma" (Japanese: 女隊長エンマ)	Kozo Morishita	Shigemitsu Taguchi	November 17, 1982
Emma tries to prove herself to Raucher by planning a trap for Dairugger, but she is injured in a flight accident and captured by Aki Team.
39	"The Tears of a Rugby Player"; Transliteration: "Ragāman no Namida" (Japanese: ラガーマンの涙)	Directed by : Yoshihide Kuriyama; Storyboarded by : Katsumi Minoguchi	Shigemitsu Taguchi	November 24, 1982
The Earth fleet captures a Galveston supply base. Commander Antonov and his comrades decide to play a friendly game of rugby with the Rugger Guard crew while in captivity while Galveston sends a reinforcement fleet to recapture the base at all costs.
40	"The Boy Denon and the Elk"; Transliteration: "Denon Shōnen to Ōshika" (Japanese: デノン少年と大鹿)	Takashi Hisaoka	Keisuke Fujikawa	December 1, 1982
41	"Discovery of the New World"; Transliteration: "Shintairiku Wakusei Hakken" (Japanese: 新大陸惑星発見)	Takenori Kawada	Keisuke Fujikawa	December 8, 1982
A Galveston exploration fleet abandons a newly discovered planet upon the arrival of the Dairugger team, leaving behind their vital data at the hands of the Rugger Guard.
42	"The Impending Crisis on the Inhabitable Planet"; Transliteration: "Kiki Semaru ka Jū Wakusei" (Japanese: 危機迫る可住惑星)	Directed by : Masao Ito; Storyboarded by : Shigeyasu Yamauchi	Keisuke Fujikawa	December 15, 1982
Tensions rise as the Earth and Galveston forces are stationed on the Number 3 Planet and the Kairugger is attacked while spying on Jackson's fleet.
43	"Teles and Asimov"; Transliteration: "Teresu to Ashimofu" (Japanese: テレスとアシモフ)	Kozo Morishita	Shigemitsu Taguchi	December 22, 1982
Teles arrives on the Number 3 Planet to begin peace negotiations with Asimov, who offers to recognize the planet as Galveston territory on the condition that the empire will cease their aspirations for galactic conquest.
44	"Aki Team Gets Caught"; Transliteration: "Aki Chīmu Tsukamaru" (Japanese: 安芸チーム捕まる)	Masao Ito	Keisuke Fujikawa	December 29, 1982
Teles is dismissed as Frontline Exploration Base Commander for his attempts at peace negotiations with Galaxy Garrison. Meanwhile, Aki Team explores an uninhabited planet and falls into a trap set by Herm's fleet.
45	"Defend the Third Planet"; Transliteration: "Dai-san Wakusei o Mamore" (Japanese: 第3惑星を守れ)	Directed by : Makoto Nagao; Storyboarded by : Masamune Ochiai	Keisuke Fujikawa	January 5, 1983
Raucher has Zucca invade the Number 3 Planet. With radar and communications jammed by the Galveston fleet, Aki must find a way to call for reinforcements.
46	"The Fall of the Exploration Base"; Transliteration: "Tansa Kichi Kanraku" (Japanese: 探査基地陥落)	Takenori Kawada	Shigemitsu Taguchi	January 12, 1983
Following the assault on the Number 3 Planet, the Three Planets Alliance fleet launches an all-out attack on Galveston's asteroid base. Outnumbered and outgunned, Raucher must prevent the Alliance from taking the base at all costs.
47	"The Invisible Super-Weapon"; Transliteration: "Sugata Naki Chō Heiki" (Japanese: 姿なき超兵器)	Directed by : Masao Ito; Storyboarded by : Shigeyasu Yamauchi	Keisuke Fujikawa	January 19, 1983
In the aftermath of the fall of the Galveston Exploration Base, the Three Planets Alliance fleet heads for the Galveston System while Caponello devises a plan to wipe out the fleet. Meanwhile, Teles is placed on house arrest and Sirk is abducted by an anti-government guerrilla faction.
48	"Get Past the Tenth Planet"; Transliteration: "Dai Jū-ban Wakusei Toppa" (Japanese: 第10番惑星突破)	Directed by : Makoto Nagao; Storyboarded by : Masamune Ochiai	Keisuke Fujikawa	January 26, 1983
The Dairugger Team approaches the Number 10 Planet of the Galveston System, but they need to deal with a volley of remote controlled mines within the planet's orbit. The situation becomes dire when Patty is injured by one of the mines. Meanwhile, Sirk and guerrilla leader Bakki ask Tess to help them free Teles from his house arrest.
49	"Entering the Final Zone of Defense"; Transliteration: "Zettai Bōei-ken Shin'nyū" (Japanese: 絶対防衛圏進入)	Directed by : Kozo Morishita; Storyboarded by : Toshihiko Arisako	Shigemitsu Taguchi	February 2, 1983
The Alliance enters Galveston's final line of defense. Despite a lack of resources and low morale among his ranks, Holtes assures Caponello that the Alliance will not get past the asteroid belt.
50	"The Struggle for Galveston"; Transliteration: "Garubesuton Kōbō" (Japanese: ガルベストン攻防)	Makoto Nagao	Keisuke Fujikawa	February 9, 1983
As the Alliance approaches planet Galveston and Caponello launches all defensive fleets against them, Teles is sprung out of his house arrest by Sirk and the guerrillas. Dairugger lands on the planet, but must now deal with three Battle Attackers and the planet's deteriorating state at the same time.
51	"The Fierce Battle in the Underground City"; Transliteration: "Chika Toshi Dai Gekisen" (Japanese: 地下都市大激戦)	Takenori Kawada	Keisuke Fujikawa	February 16, 1983
Dairugger and the Alliance break through Galveston's underground city while Teles leads the combined guerrilla faction and civilian resistance to overthrow the government.
52	"Galactic Dawn"; Transliteration: "Ginga no Yoake" (Japanese: 銀河の夜明け)	Kozo Morishita	Keisuke Fujikawa	February 23, 1983
On February 9, 2203, following the fall of the Galveston Empire, Teles and Tess begin peace negotiations with the Alliance to ensure the survival of their people. However, time is running out, as the planet has moments left before its destruction.
XX	"Emergency Launch Dairugger"; Transliteration: "Kinkyū Hasshin Dairagā" (Japanese: 緊急発進ダイラガー)	Unknown	Unknown	March 2, 1983
Recap episode 1.
XX	"Heroes Scattered on the Battlefield"; Transliteration: "Senjō ni Chiru Yūsha-tachi" (Japanese: 戦場に散る勇者たち)	Unknown	Unknown	March 9, 1983
Recap episode 2.
XX	"Road to the New Continent"; Transliteration: "Shintairiku e no Michi" (Japanese: 新大陸への道)	Unknown	Unknown	March 16, 1983
Recap episode 3.
XX	"Dairugger's Glory"; Transliteration: "Eikō no Dairagā" (Japanese: 栄光のダイラガー)	Unknown	Unknown	March 23, 1983
Recap episode 4.

== Staff ==
- Planning
  Susumu Yoshikawa
  Yasuo Oyobe
  Yu Saito
- Original concept
  Saburo Hatte
- Chief Director
  Kozo Morishita
- Series Composition
  Keisuke Fujikawa
- Script
  Keisuke Fujikawa
  Shigemitsu Taguchi
- Character Design
  Shigetaka Kiyoyama
- Mechanical Design
  Katsushi Murakami
  Takayuki Masuo
  Yoshiroh Harada
  Yutaka Izubuchi
- Music
  Seiji Yokoyama
- Production
  Toei
  Toei Agency
  TV Tokyo
  Daiwon Animation
  Toei Animation

== Merchandise ==
In 1982, the original DX Dairugger XV toys were released by Popy Pleasure under the toy release number of GB-72, as part of the Chogokin label, and constructed of high-quality die-cast materials, with transforming gimmicks, which could separate only into the three larger combined vehicles. GB-73, a cheaper, ST (standard) version would follow, only Rugger #5 could separate from the robot. A larger version of Dairugger XV was also released, which did not contain die-cast materials, as the metal content was too heavy for the design and for the friction motors installed in many of the vehicles. The smallest non-transforming ST Dairugger and the fully transforming plastic Dairugger XV would be resold in the U.S. as part of the Voltron series by Matchbox in 1984, entirely under the Voltron name. However, the Matchbox version omitted the Dairugger Sword, Rugger units #6, #9, and #10's chrome antenna parts, and the sticker sheets of the Popy version. In addition to the toys above, Popy released a smaller, rubber-based combining Dairugger toy that was molded only in light blue. LJN released this toy in the Voltron series in 1985, with all of the parts remolded in roughly their proper colors and the sword in yellow.

Because Dairugger had 15 pieces, and was a highly playable figure compared to many of the other fixed-state super robots of the early 1980s, there were many imitations and bootlegs of Dairugger. Some were cheap plastics, did not assemble well, and had neon-glowing colors dissimilar to the show. Even approved brands such as Big Bear were spawned to rejuvenate the toyline. However, no version is identical in quality, packaging, or comes with all the pieces as does the Japanese original.

Toynami released a 24-inch soft vinyl Dairugger toy under their Shogun Warriors line in 2011.

In 2013, Miracle Productions released a new Dairugger toy as MA-01 "Voltron Vehicle Force". The initial release was limited to a few hundred units and was plagued with quality control issues and design flaws. A second version was released, with many of the parts redesigned and the build quality improved. This toy is considered an unofficial release, as Miracle Productions lost their license to produce the toy before its release.

A new Dairugger toy was released on October 26, 2019, as Soul of Chogokin No. GX-88 by Bandai Spirits. To promote the toy's release, Bandai uploaded the series on their YouTube channel. Like the SOC GoLion, Dairugger includes a weapons rack with the option to use either the Dairugger XV or Voltron nameplate.

== Home media ==
The entire series, in 3 volumes, has been released on DVD in region 1. Collection 1 was released on February 23, 2010, Collection 2 on May 25, 2010, and Collection 3 on January 4, 2011. All three volumes are now out-of-print.

== Changes for Voltron version ==
Note: for this section, names in parentheses are Voltron names

- Dairugger XV and GoLion are not related in any way, in contrast to the U.S. version (the coincidental similarities in design, most notably in the face, are due to having the same mechanical designer and a significant portion of the same animation staff).
- Scenes of Earth and Galaxy Garrison were edited into Lion Voltron episodes, but do not exist in GoLion (the Lion Voltron source material), only in Dairugger XV, since Earth in GoLion has been destroyed in a thermonuclear war.
- Many allied and enemy soldiers and commanding officers die in Dairugger, as opposed to disappearing without any explanation in the U.S. Voltron series (Voltron omitted almost all blood and death). The finale of Dairugger XV was different in its Voltron form — the U.S. footage had no depiction of Emperor Corsair's (Zeppo's) true fate, which left a lot of questions for U.S. viewers (although one shot of Corsair dead on the throne remained intact). The scene of Emperor Corsair's death, perishing in an assassination attempt by Teles (Hazar) and the resistance, who want freedom for their people, was cut due to violence.
- In Voltron, Vehicle Voltron only has five minutes of stored nuclear/solar energy once combined and is thus used only as a last resort against the Drule Empire's Robeasts. This has resulted in numerous plot holes, as Vehicle Voltron is seen participating in lengthy space battles exceeding five minutes.
- In Dairugger, Teles (Hazar) dies a martyr, and there is a sad scene where his body is left to die on Galveston at his request. In Voltron, he becomes the new leader of his people.
- Sirk (Dorma) is Teles's adjutant, not his sister as in Voltron.
- Aki (Jeff) and Haruka (Lisa) have a closer relationship, which is not clearly shown in Voltron. The lucky charm that Haruka gives to Aki is left with Teles (Hazar) after his death on Galveston.
- Dick Asimov (Captain Newley) was Shinji Ise's (Commander Hawkins) superior officer in the original series. The dialogue was rewritten in Voltron to suggest that Hawkins was Newley's superior. There were inconsistencies, however that reveal the original ranks of the two officers.

== Korean version ==
Super Titan 15 (슈퍼타이탄15) is a 1982 South Korean animated film that features a copy of Dairugger XV, as well as characters and vehicles derived from Galaxy Express 999.

== Appearances in other media ==
The show was spoofed on an episode of Robot Chicken. Dairugger's Voltron incarnation is called to action by an outpost being attacked by a Robeast, but the vehicles take too long to combine (partly because they messed up halfway through). By the time Dairugger gets there, most of the crew is dead, and the sole survivor shoots himself when he realizes it's not the Lion Voltron.
