= Voltron (TV series) =

1984 Japanese-American animated series

- Title screen
- Also known as: Lion Force Voltron (series 1); Vehicle Team Voltron (series 2); Voltron: Defender of the Universe (Note: Original first-run syndication title.)
- Genre: Sci-fi, action/adventure, mecha
- Created by: Ted Koplar; Peter Keefe; Saburō Yatsude (original concept)
- Based on: Series 1 Beast King Go-Lion by Toei Animation and Tokyo Dōga (Note: Uncredited) Series 2 Armored Fleet Dairugger XV by Toei Animation
- Story by: Jameson Brewer
- Directed by: Franklin Cofod
- Composer: John Petersen
- Countries of origin: United States; Japan (original)
- No. of series: 2
- No. of episodes: 124 (total): 72 (series 1) 52 (series 2); (list of episodes)

Production
- Producers: Ted Koplar; Peter Keefe
- Animators: Toei Animation; Tokyo Dōga (series 1)
- Running time: 25 minutes
- Production companies: World Events Productions; Toei Company

Original release
- Network: First-run syndication
- Release: September 10, 1984 – November 18, 1985

Related
- Voltron: Fleet of Doom (1986); Voltron: The Third Dimension (1998)

Voltron, formerly known as Voltron: Defender of the Universe, is a science fiction animated television series produced by World Events Productions for a total of 124 episodes. The series is an adaptation of the Japanese super robot anime series Beast King Go-Lion, which was dubbed into English and edited to create Voltron episodes. Later episodes also use footage from the mecha anime Armored Fleet Dairugger XV.

== Premise ==
=== Lion Voltron ===
From days of long ago, from uncharted regions of the universe, comes a legend. The legend of Voltron, Defender of the Universe! A mighty robot – loved by good, feared by evil. As Voltron's legend grew, peace settled across the galaxy. On planet Earth, a Galaxy Alliance was formed. Together with the good planets of the Solar System, they maintained peace throughout the universe – until... a new, horrible menace threatened the galaxy. Voltron was needed once more. This is the story of the super force of space explorers, specially trained, and sent by the Alliance, to bring back... Voltron: Defender of the Universe!

— Narrator (Peter Cullen) during the opening sequence

The first season is about five pilots who command five robot lions which combine to form Voltron. These pilots use these machines to protect the planet Arus from the evil Warlord King Zarkon and witch Haggar who creates monsters called Robeasts to terrorize the planet ruled by Princess Allura.

=== Vehicle Voltron ===
From days of long ago, from uncharted regions of the universe, comes a legend. The legend of Voltron, Defender of the Universe! A mighty robot – loved by good, feared by evil. As Voltron's legend grew, peace settled across the galaxy. On planet Earth, a Galaxy Alliance was formed. Together with the good planets of the Solar System, they maintained peace throughout the universe – until... a new, horrible menace threatened the galaxy. Voltron was needed once more. This is the story of a super force of space explorers, entrusted by the Alliance with the ancient secret on how to assemble... Voltron: Defender of the Universe!

— Narrator during the opening sequence

The second season of the show was called Vehicle Voltron, based on Armored Fleet Dairugger XV, which spawned also a television special called Voltron: Fleet of Doom. The premise of season two is the Galaxy Alliance's home worlds have become overcrowded and search for new planets to colonise. This puts the Alliance in conflict with the Drule empire.

The protagonists are divided into teams. Each team is specialized in gathering data or fighting in their area of expertise. Each squad combines their vehicles into a bigger machine, with each vehicle differing among the three teams. These fighters are:

- The Aqua Fighter (Sea Team)
- The Turbo Terrain Fighter (Land Team)
- The Strato Fighter (Air Team)

== Voice cast ==
- Neil Ross as Keith and Pidge
- Michael Bell as Lance and Sven
- Lennie Weinrib as Hunk and Prince Lotor
- B. J. Ward as Princess Allura and Haggar
- Peter Cullen as Coran and Narrator
- Jack Angel as King Zarkon
- Tress MacNeille as Queen Merla

== Production and development ==
Ted Koplar assembled a team in Los Angeles to transform Go-Lion into what would become Voltron. Peter Keefe was brought aboard as Executive Producer, with Franklin Cofod as the Director. Since they had no means of translating the Japanese series into English, Keefe and Cofod surmised the plots, commissioned writer Jameson Brewer to write all-new dialogue, edited out the more violent scenes, and remixed the audio into stereo format. The series was an immediate hit in the United States, topping the syndication market for children's programs in the mid-1980s.

The Japanese series Future Robot Daltanious was originally planned to be adapted by World Events Productions as part of Voltron. When requesting master tapes from Toei Animation for translation purposes, the World Events Productions producers requested "[the] ones with the lion." Mistakenly, Toei then proceeded to ship World Events copies of Beast King Go-Lion, another "combining-robot" cartoon which featured lion-shaped fighting robot starships. Because the World Events producers greatly preferred Go-Lion to Daltanious, the Go-Lion episodes were adapted instead, going on to become the most popular portion of the original Voltron run. A third version/series of Voltron based on yet another Japanese series, Lightspeed Electroid Albegas, was also in progress, but it was dropped when World Events Productions joined with Toei to make new Go-Lion-based shows, due to that show's popularity over the Dairugger run.

== Changes from the Japanese version ==
Though airing in syndication, which offered other anime shows such as Robotech greater freedom to deal with subject matter such as death that were off-limits in most US network children's programming, WEP's adaptation of Voltron was heavily edited to conform to the more conservative standards of children's television in the United States, as well as the standard name change of characters and concepts in Go-Lion and Dairugger.

=== Plot changes ===
==== Lion Force & Go-Lion ====
- In Voltron, the show begins with the five pilots sent by the Galaxy Alliance, whose space-exploration mission takes them to a planet devastated by war. In Voltron, the pilots arrive on Arus and are captured and taken to Planet Doom. They then escape, return to Arus, and become the pilots of the robot lions and Voltron. In Go-Lion, the initial scenes are actually of Earth; the pilots have returned from their mission (in the then-futuristic year of 1999) to find that the entire population of Earth has been killed in a nuclear war. They are then captured and taken to Planet Galra, where the plot proceeds similarly, only the planet they find the lions on is called Altea. In the Voltron version, some footage of the pilots' arrival on Arus was taken from Armored Fleet Dairugger XV.
- Scenes of torture and atrocities inflicted by the alien conquerors on their slaves (such as a "contest" where alien soldiers would be rewarded according to how many prisoners they managed to decapitate in a given time) and some shots of corpses were removed.
- In Go-Lion, Takashi 'Shiro' Shirogane (Sven in Voltron), the original pilot of Blue Lion, is killed in a battle with Honerva, and his similar-looking younger brother Ryou appears later in the series to join in the fight against Emperor Daibazaal. In Voltron, dialog was inserted to indicate that Sven is merely injured and has been sent away to a hospital planet to recover, and the character of Ryou was rewritten entirely into Sven being enslaved after said planet was taken over, then escaping and managing to reunite with his friends.
- In Go-Lion, Hys (Nanny) is fatally shot in the heart while protecting Raible (Coran). This scene was completely removed from Voltron, and later episodes used stock footage from earlier in the series to insert the character into scenes that took place after her original death.
- In Go-Lion, a slave girl named Lisa was a survivor of the nuclear war. Near the end of her debut episode, Tsuyoshi 'Hothead' Seidou (Hunk in Voltron) urges her to wake up and join in the fight against Emperor Daibazaal (King Zarkon in Voltron), however she is too crushed by her despair to trust even a fellow human (that race being responsible for the destruction of her homeworld) and chooses to step off a cliff the two were standing on, rather than live without her brother. In Voltron, this sequence was removed, and it was explained to the audience that this girl, now named Twyla, had been allowed to go home to her own planet (a planet other than Earth).
- In episode 21 of Go-Lion, there are implications that Prince Sincline (Prince Lotor in Voltron) sexually enslaved Princess Amue (Romelle in Voltron) when she was his prisoner, due to her physical similarities to Princess Fala. The Voltron dialogues imply that he tortured her instead.

== Home media ==
From 1984 to 1985, Sony Video Software Operations released some episodes of Voltron on VHS and Betamax in several named but unnumbered volumes, including "Castle of Lions", "Planet Doom", "Planet Arus", "Zarkon's Revenge", "Merla, Queen of Darkness", "Journey to the Lost Planets", "Perils of Princess Allura", "Return of Sven", and "The Blue Robot's Revenge". The packaging for these volumes did not specify which episodes were on them; advertised runtimes varied from 20 to 86 minutes. Sony had bought out the rights to the series under the leadership of John O'Donnell, who go on to found Central Park Media.

Lionsgate Home Entertainment released or re-released some episodes of the show on VHS in four numbered volumes in 2001. Volume 1 included the special "Fleet of Doom" and episode 71, "The Alliance Strikes Back". Volumes 2-4 included the first six episodes of the show in chronological order.

The show was released on DVD by the likes of Media Blasters and Gaiam Vivendi Entertainment, and was released on a Complete Series DVD set by Universal Pictures Home Entertainment with their distribution deal with DreamWorks Animation on September 10, 2019.

== Reception ==
The show was ranked the 76th best animated series by IGN.

== Other media ==
=== Sequels ===
A CGI sequel series that takes place five years after the first series that deviated from the original design, the series centers around the Voltron Force reuniting to fight bionic Prince Lotor, while dealing with an artificial intelligence "Amalgamus", a sophisticated computer and a supposedly reformed King Zarkon. Ross, Ward, and Bell were the only cast members to return.

Another sequel series that features the Voltron Force and their three cadets training to be the next Voltron pilots, while battling their old enemy Lotor and corrupt military head intent on destroying the Voltron and its pilots to stage a coup d'état and become president of Galaxy Garrison himself. The series aired on Nicktoons and ended after one season.

=== Video game ===
A video game based on the 1984 show was released in 2011 for PlayStation 3 and Xbox 360 consoles.

=== Reboot ===
On January 5, 2016, Netflix and DreamWorks Animation announced a new original animated Voltron series to debut in 2016 as a reboot of both the franchise and the GoLion anime. Produced in an anime-influenced style with CGI Voltron action sequences, featuring a whole new cast with Lauren Montgomery and Joaquim Dos Santos, both known for their work on Avatar: The Last Airbender and its sequel The Legend of Korra, as showrunners. The show debuted on Netflix and ran for 8 seasons with a total of 78 episodes.
