= Peter Keefe =

American television producer

- Born: Peter Eugene Keefe; November 16, 1952; Rochester, New York, U.S.
- Died: May 27, 2010 (aged 57); Rochester, New York, U.S.
- Occupation: Television producer
- Years active: 1970–2010
- Known for: Adaptation of Beast King GoLion and Armored Fleet Dairugger XV into Voltron: Defender of the Universe for American television
- Spouse: Pamela Mills
- Children: James (stepson)
- Relatives: Anne (mother, maiden name unknown); Mollie, Lisa, and Kittie (sisters); Anthony, Christopher (brothers)

Peter Eugene Keefe (November 16, 1952 – May 27, 2010) was an American television producer best known for creating the series Voltron, an English-dubbed combination of Beast King GoLion, and Armored Fleet Dairugger XV, two similar but unrelated "mecha" (giant robot) anime series originally created and produced by Toei Animation. Keefe's work on the series is credited with introducing American audiences to Japanese animation and influenced later shows like the Dragon Ball, Pokémon, and Power Rangers franchises, although earlier Japanese TV programs like Astro Boy, Speed Racer and Ultraman had aired on American television prior to the premiere of Voltron.

== Life and career ==
Keefe was born on November 16, 1952, in Rochester, New York. His television career began as a movie critic for TV station KPLR in St. Louis, Missouri and he later produced documentaries for World Events Productions.

His "hugely popular" 1980s cartoon series Voltron featured a group of five spaceships that combined to form the robot Voltron, who used his sword to protect the universe. Centered as it was around an early and highly successful example of the gestalt robot kaiju fighter, the series was credited by The New York Times in his obituary as having "helped prepare the way for other Japanese-style animation in the United States." During its run from 1984 to 1987, Voltron was the top-ranked syndicated children's program. It brought forth several spinoffs and merchandise licensing deals. The Voltron series was created by Keefe (in partnership with Jameson Brewer, Marc Handler, Franklin Cofod and others) by cutting and pasting bits of the Japanese anime shows Beast King GoLion and Kikou Kantai Dairugger XV. Keefe licensed the programs in 1983 and updated the scripts for American audiences with less violence than the originals, removing Japanese locations and cultural information to allow the material to be marketed worldwide.

After Voltron, Keefe created other animated series including Denver the Last Dinosaur, Vytor: The Starfire Champion (a series which only lasted four episodes), Widget, Twinkle the Dream Being and The Mr. Bogus Show. The last three series were produced by Zodiac Entertainment, a company Keefe helped to found. Over a 20-year span, Keefe created 600 half-hour episodes that were enjoyed by millions of children worldwide. He also adapted another anime series, Star Musketeer Bismarck, into Saber Rider and the Star Sheriffs, which was subject to much more significant editing and changes compared to his GoLion and Dairugger XV adaptations.

After Zodiac closed down, Keefe went on to join other companies including Zen Entertainment (as Managing Director from 1994 to 1996). He also launched two global television production and merchandise licensing consultant companies of his own, Peter Keefe Productions and Equator Entertainment (where he also worked as Managing Director). In 1997, he went onto be creative consultant on The Mr. Men Show, an American-Canadian children's television series that introduced the British Mr. Men and Little Miss animated series to the United States. In June 2003, Keefe joined the media and entertainment company Earthworks Entertainment, where he was Chief Executive Officer. There, he marketed and worked on an animated children's Christmas special called Nine Dog Christmas, which revolved around nine stray dogs who are recruited as reindeers to help Santa bring Christmas to the world when his reindeer catch a flu. The special aired on Cartoon Network in the United States in 2005 and on Disney Channel in Asia and Europe.

== Death and survivors ==
Known for his distinctive mustache and cowboy boots, Keefe died of throat cancer in Rochester, New York at the age of 57. He was survived by his wife Pamela Mills Keefe, mother Anne, stepson James and five siblings (sisters Mollie, Lisa and Kittie and brothers Tony and Chris).

Before his death, Keefe was developing an animated series for Earthworks Entertainment called Z-Force (Zodiac Force), which features twelve action super heroes based on the ancient Oriental Zodiac. He was also a mentor and consultant to Aulsondro "Novelist" Hamilton (better known as Emcee N.I.C.E.) and William "Dolla" Chapman II (better known as D.B.I.) for the CGI musical animated series Da Jammies, produced by Toon Farm Animation for Netflix.
