= Sei Young Animation =

South Korean animation studio

Sei Young Animation Co., Ltd. 世映動畵(株)
- Industry: Animation
- Founded: 1981; 45 years ago
- Founder: Kim Dae-jung
- Defunct: October 1998; 28 years ago
- Fate: Merged With Dong Woo Animation
- Headquarters: Seoul, South Korea

Sei Young Animation Co., Ltd. (Korean: 세영동화(주); Hanja: 世映動畵(株)) was an animation studio based in South Korea, known best for working overseas for North America animated TV shows, such as The Super Mario Bros. Super Show!, The Legend of Zelda, and The Adventures of Super Mario Bros. 3. It also worked on Japanese productions such as Final Yamato, Video Senshi Laserion and Nadia: The Secret of Blue Water. They merged with Dong Woo Animation in October 1998 due to the 1997 Asian financial crisis. Kim Dae-jung (the founder of Sei Young Animation) died from liver cancer on September 14, 2017.

== Animation production ==
=== 1980s ===
- The Smurfs (Uncredited)
- G.I. Joe: A Real American Hero (Uncredited)
- The Transformers (Uncredited) (Animation Production shared with AKOM)
- Defenders of the Earth (Uncredited)
- Sylvanian Families (Animation Production shared with KK C&D Asia, Mook Animation and TMS Entertainment)
- Blondie and Dagwood (Failed pilot)
- Beetle Bailey (Failed pilot)
- The Legend of Zelda
- The Super Mario Bros. Super Show!
- G.I. Joe: A Real American Hero (DIC series) (Storyboards and Animation, Season 1 only)
- Captain N: The Game Master (Season 1 only along with Dong Yang Animation)
- Ring Raiders

=== 1990s ===
- Captain Planet and the Planeteers (Uncredited)
- Alvin & the Chipmunks (Season 8 only, replacing A-1 Productions)
- The Real Ghostbusters (Animation Production shared with A.C. Productions, Credited as Sei Young Productions, Season 6 only)
- The Legend of Prince Valiant
- The Adventures of Super Mario Bros. 3 (Animation Production shared with Pacific Rim Productions)
- ProStars (Animation Production shared with Dong Woo Animation)
- Camp Candy (Season 3 only, replacing KK C&D Asia)
- The Odyssey: A Journey Back Home
- Saban’s Gulliver’s Travels
- The Moo Family Holiday Hoe-Down
- Around the World in Eighty Dreams
- Journey to the Heart of the World
- Bubsy (Failed pilot)
- Phantom 2040 (Animation Production shared with Saerom Animation)
- Flash Gordon (Animation Production shared with AKOM and Fantôme Animation)
- The Prince of Atlantis (Animation Production shared with Samil Animation)

=== 1980s ===
- Final Yamato (宇宙戦艦ヤマト 完結編) (Toei Animation) (Production Cooperation)
- Lightspeed Electroid Albegas (光速電神アルベガス) (Toei Animation) (Production Cooperation, Episodes 1–2, 15, 20 and 33 only)
- Video Senshi Laserion (ビデオ戦士レザリオン) (Toei Animation) (Production Cooperation, Episodes 3, 7, 11, 13, 15, 19, 23, 27, 31, 35, 39 and 43 only)
- Kinnikuman: Showdown! The 7 Justice Supermen vs. The Space Samurais (キン肉マン 決戦!7人の正義超人vs宇宙野武士) (Toei Animation) (Key Animation)
- Odin: Photon Sailer Starlight (オーディーン 光子帆船スターライト) (Toei Animation) (Production Cooperation)
- Fist of the North Star (北斗の拳) (Toei Animation) (Production Cooperation)
- Ultraman Kids no Kotowaza Monogatari (ウルトラマンキッズのことわざ物語) (Tsuburaya Productions) (Production Cooperation)
- The Three Musketeers Anime (アニメ三銃士) (Korean-Japanese Co-production with Gallop)

=== 1990s ===
- Nadia: The Secret of Blue Water (ふしぎの海のナディア) (Korean-Japanese Co-production with Group TAC & Gainax)
- Nadia: The Motion Picture (ふしぎの海のナディア 劇場用オリジナル版) (Korean-Japanese Co-production with Group TAC & Gainax)
- The Guyver: Bio-Booster Armor (強殖装甲ガイバー) (Animate Film) (Production Cooperation, Key Animation, Illustrations and Cinematography, Episodes 8 and 11–12 only)
- Romance of the Three Kingdoms (三国志) (Toei Animation) (Production Cooperation, Parts 2–3 only)
- Montana Jones (モンタナ・ジョーンズ) (Korean-Japanese-Italian Co-production with Studio Junio and REVER) (Background Art, Finishing, In between Animation, Animation Direction and Shooting, Credited as Sei Young Anitel)
- Harimogu Harley (はりもぐハーリー) (Image K & Studio Junio) (In-Between & Finish Animation for Episodes 1–2, 6–8, 14–17, 19, 23–26, 28, 34–35, 38–40, 43–47, 53, 55, 57–60, 65–67, 73–74 and 77–81 only, In-Between & Finish Animation for Episodes 87, 89, 91, 94–96, 98, 105, 107, 109, 111–113, 116, 119, 124, 126, 128, 131–133, 137 and 139 was done by Shin Young Animation)
- Hakugei: Legend of the Moby Dick (白鯨伝説) (Studio Junio & Tezuka Productions) (In-Between & Clean-Up Animation and Background Art, Season 1 (Episodes 1–18) only)
- Beast Wars II: Super Life-Form Transformers (ビーストウォーズII 超生命体トランスフォーマー) (Production Reed) (Key and In-Between Animation and Animation Direction, Episodes 2, 6, 8, 11–12, 15, 17–18, 22, 25 and 28 only)

=== 1980s ===
- Wanderer Kkachi (떠돌이 까치) (Animation Production shared with Dai Won Animation Co. and Shin Won Productions)
- The Land of Stories ABC (동화나라 ABC) (Credited as Sei Young Anitel)
- 독고탁의 비둘기 합창
- 2020 Space Wonder Kiddy (2020년 우주의 원더키디)

=== 1990s ===
- 어린이의 눈은 속일 수 없습니다. (VHS Anti-Piracy PSA)
- Widget, the World Watcher (외계소년 위제트) (Korean-American Co-production with Zodiac Entertainment and Calico Creations)
- Eunbi & Kabi's Once Upon a Time (은비 까비의 옛날 옛적에) (Animation Production shared with Hanho Heung-Up and Dong Woo Animation)
- Mr. Bogus (보거스는 내 친구) (Korean-American Co-production with Zodiac Entertainment and Calico Creations) (Credited as Sei Young Anitel)
- Where's Wally?: The Animated Series (월리를 찾아라) (Korean-American-British Co-production with DIC and HIT Entertainment)
- The Honey Bee's Friend (꿀벌의 친구)
- Twinkle, the Dream Being (꿈돌이) (Korean-American Co-production with Zodiac Entertainment and Calico Creations to promote the 1993 Taejŏn Expo) (Credited as Sei Young Anitel)
- TongTong Trio (통통이 삼총사) (Episodes 1–10 only)
- 초롱이의 옛날여행 (Later retitled as 역사만화 한국위인전 for its home video release)
- Space Strikers (빛돌이 우주 2만리) (Korean-American-French Co-production with M6 and Saban Entertainment originally created to promote SBS (Seoul Broadcasting System)'s mascot Victory (빛돌이)) (Credited as Sei Young Anitel)
- Jang Bogo: The King of the Sea (해상왕 장보고)

== See also ==
- Daewon Media (Sei Young Animation was founded by former Daewon Media animator Kim Dae-jung in 1981)
- Kyoyuk Donghwasa (Korean: 교육동화사; Hanja: 敎育動畵社)
- Production Grimi (Formally known as Shin Won Productions)
- Hahn Shin Corporation
- Sae Hahn Productions
- Dong Woo Animation (Much of the Sei Young staff moved to Dong Woo Animation.)
- Off-model
