= Zodiac Entertainment =

American television production/distribution company

- Type: Subsidiary
- Industry: Animation
- Founded: 1989
- Founders: Peter Keefe; Brian Lacey
- Defunct: 1994
- Fate: Acquired by Carlton Communications
- Headquarters: Studio City, California, United States
- Products: Television series
- Parent: Central Independent Television

Zodiac Entertainment was an American entertainment company that specialized in the production and distribution of animated cartoons. The company was founded in 1989 by Central Independent Television, a British media company that was aiming to establish a television production company in the United States. Two veterans of the animation industry, Brian Lacey and Peter Keefe helped establish and run the firm. The company's animation studio aimed to produce original television series that could easily be translated and broadcast around the world. To this end, its programs avoided overt Americanisms and references to U.S.-specific culture.

Despite finding ratings success and notoriety with its first two animated series, the environmentalism-themed Widget and the comedic Mr. Bogus, the company struggled to compete for timeslots and advertising money with larger companies. Its third and final original series was Twinkle, the Dream Being, a Korean-American Co-production originally created to promote the 1993 Taejŏn Expo. In 1994, after its parent company was bought, Zodiac ceased producing original programming and announced that it would function exclusively as a distributor of television shows.

== History ==
The company had its roots in British-based media company Central Independent Television. In 1987, company officials went to the United States with the aim of purchasing a television production company. The company did not find what it was looking for and instead founded its own company, Zodiac Entertainment. Brian Lacey and Peter Keefe, two veterans of the animation industry helped form that company and former Central Independent executive Kevin Morrison was placed as the company's managing director. Keefe served as director of production and creative development, while Lacey headed the company's marketing efforts.

Over the first three years of Zodiac's existence, Central Independent spent $26 million on the company. By 1992, the company had fifteen employees, including five in New York City, where its marketing department was headquartered. Its animation production was done in South Korea by Sei Young Animation. Although one report claimed that the company would begin production on an outer space-based teen soap opera, the company's first television production was Widget, an environmentalism-themed animated series starring a shapeshifting purple alien who saves the earth from evil threats to the environment. The show started out being shown in syndication on weekends before being expanded to five days a week, eventually reaching 80% of the U.S. television market. In keeping with the company's aim of creating programs that could easily be translated and broadcast in other countries, the program was also shown in 90 countries around the world. It was also recognized as recommended viewing for children by the National Education Association.

The company's second production, Mr. Bogus was based on a Belgian character. It became the highest-rated weekly syndicated children's show in the U.S. during May 1992's sweeps week. Despite having early success with its first two series and a projected revenue of $10 million in 1992, Zodiac had yet to turn a profit.

Zodiac then introduced a third series, Twinkle, the Dream Being, which would turn out to be the last animated series the company would produce. By 1994, Central Independent Television had pumped a total of $35 million into the company. That year, Central Independent was acquired by Carlton Communications and shortly after, Zodiac announced that it would leave the television production business. Instead, Zodiac would continue as a distributor of its existing properties and other productions that it might acquire. The company cited difficulty competing for timeslots and advertising money with larger studios in the same business, such as Disney and Warner Bros. as a reason for exiting the industry. Some industry observers remarked that the studio could have done well by producing series for other firms such as toy companies rather than developing its own properties. However, Zodiac president Kevin Morrison rejected the notion as running contrary to the company's philosophy of developing quality original programming.

== See also ==
- World Events Productions
