= Saudi 2 =

Television channel

- Country: Saudi Arabia
- Broadcast area: Saudi Arabia; Arab World; Worldwide
- Network: Saudi TV
- Headquarters: Riyadh, Medina Saudi Arabia

Programming
- Language: English
- Picture format: 16:9 576i SDTV

Ownership
- Owner: Saudi Government
- Sister channels: Al Saudiya; Faaliat; SBC; KSA SPORTS; Quran TV; Sunna TV

History
- Launched: August 9, 1983; 43 years ago (original)
- Closed: December 22, 2017; 8 years ago (original)
- Former names: KSA 2

Links
- Website: www.saudi2tv.sa

Saudi TV Channel 2 (KSA 2), or as of 2014 known as Saudi 2 was the English news and entertainment TV channel of Saudi Arabia.

Established in 1983, the channel used to produce programmes focusing on cultural, political, and economic issues aimed at expatriates living in Saudi Arabia. Following its conversion to a 24-hour channel it expanded its broadcasting to Europe and North America in the middle of 2007 and now employs a large network of news correspondents based in the Middle East, the United Kingdom and the United States.

Despite being the only English-language public channel for Saudi Arabian expatriates, the Minister of Culture and Information Dr. Awwad Bin Saleh Al-Awwad has suspended the channel's transmission in December 2017 as part of a plan to suit the Saudi Vision 2030.

== History ==
The Saudi government began planning the second network in 1979, with the launch expected for the first few months of 1980. The goal was to reserve one channel for informative, cultural and educational programming and the other channel for entertainment. According to the Third Development Plan which oversaw the creation of the new channel, the new service would concentrate its efforts on "cultural programs, current events and features about national development, and public information campaigns", with the existing channel concentrating on entertainment and public information, with an "appropriate mix of programs" for both.

The launch of the channel was delayed following the events of the Grand Mosque seizure of 1979, leading to its launch in August 1983, three years after it was initially planned. The new goal was to target foreigners working in Saudi Arabia.

The channel was the first in Saudi Arabia to carry commercial advertising in 1986, though in Arabic instead of English, the dominant language of the service.

== Former programming ==
=== Foreign ===
==== Cartoons ====
- The Ruff and Reddy Show
- Mr. Bogus
- Danger Mouse
- Bouli
- The Telebugs
- Hammerman
- Widget
- Superman
- Chip 'n Dale Rescue Rangers
- Top Cat
- Yakky Doodle
- Wowser
- Rub-a-Dub-Dub
- Diplodos
- Goofy
- My Little Pony
- Seabert
- Bionic Six
- My Pet Monster
- Dexter's Laboratory
- The Pink Panther Show
- Dastardly and Muttley in Their Flying Machines
- Huckleberry Hound
- Tom & Jerry Kids
- Adventures of Pow Wow
- Amigo and Friends
- Moomin
- Popples
- Casper and Friends
- The Abbott and Costello Cartoon Show
- Rupert
- Pluto
- The Flintstones
- Sylvanian Families
- Pingu
- The Jetsons
- M.A.S.K.
- Harlem Globetrotters
- The Adventures of Tintin
- Snooper and Blabber
- Hurricanes
- Glo Friends
- Foofur
- Beany and Cecil
- The Road Runner Show
- Quick Draw McGraw
- Loopy De Loop
- The Adventures of Super Mario Bros. 3
- Yogi Bear
- Teenage Mutant Ninja Turtles
- Plonsters
- The Adventures of Teddy Ruxpin
- Simon in the Land of Chalk Drawings
- The Shoe People
- Tiny Toon Adventures
- Dinky Di's
- Looney Tunes
- Ricochet Rabbit & Droop-a-Long
- Scooby-Doo, Where Are You!
- Yo, Yogi!
- The Mumbly Cartoon Show
- The Pink Panther
- Centurions
- Snorks
- Dink, the Little Dinosaur
- Adventures of Sonic the Hedgehog
- The All-New Popeye Show
- Spider-Man
- The Teddy Bear Show
- Lippy the Lion and Hardy Har Har
- Where on Earth Is Carmen Sandiego?
- The New 3 Stooges
- Popeye and Son
- Deputy Dawg
- Bozo: The World's Most Famous Clown
- Inspector Gadget
- Kimba the White Lion
- Bucky and Pepito
- Merrie Melodies
- DuckTales
- Touché Turtle and Dum Dum
- Pixie and Dixie and Mr. Jinks
- Thunderbirds 2086
- The Beary Family
- Double Dragon
- Dennis the Menace
- Young Samson & Goliath
- MoonDreamers
- Peter Potamus
- Fables of the Green Forest
- Bolek and Lolek
- Oggy and the Cockroaches
- Tom and Jerry
- The Three Mouseketeers
- Spiral Zone
- Droopy
- Miaunel and Bălănel
- Terrytoons
- Woody Woodpecker
- Mole
- Fleischer Cartoons
- The Woody Woodpecker Show
- Denver, the Last Dinosaur
- Hickory, Dickory, and Doc
- Inspector Willoughby
- Wally Gator
- The New Adventures of Mighty Mouse and Heckle & Jeckle
- Bucky O'Hare and the Toad Wars
- Laurel and Hardy
- Spirou
- The Tom and Jerry Show
- Heroes on Hot Wheels
- The Undersea Adventures of Captain Nemo
- Demetan Croaker, The Boy Frog
- Augie Doggie and Doggie Daddy
- Snagglepuss
- The Ant and the Aardvark
- The Bugs Bunny Show
- Mighty Mouse
- Potato Head Kids
- The Hillbilly Bears
- Zoo Olympics
- Tom of T.H.U.M.B.
- The Inspector
- My Little Pony Tales
- "Lady Lovely Locks"
- Little Bear
- Donald Duck
- Chilly Willy
- Barney Bear
- The Berenstain Bears
- Swifty and Shorty
- Popeye the Sailor Man
- Andy Panda
- The Tijuana Toads
- Space Ghost
- The Smurfs
- Precious Pupp
- Mr. Magoo
- "The King Kong Show"
- Here Comes the Grump
- Fat Albert and the Cosby Kids
- Atom Ant
- The Houndcats
- Zoo Cup
- Phantom 2040
- The Adventures of Rocky and Bullwinkle and Friends
- The Great Grape Ape Show
- Rescue Heroes

==== Children's ====
- You Can't Do That on Television
- 3-2-1 Contact
- Zoom
- The Electric Company
- Beakman's World
- Land of the Lost
- Square One Television
- Today's Special
- The Dr. Fad Show
- Sesame Street
- Mike and Angelo
- EMU-TV
- The Girl from Tomorrow
- Bananas in Pyjamas
- Fraggle Rock
- Size Small
- Captain Power and the Soldiers of the Future
- The Secret World of Alex Mack
- Road to Avonlea
- My Secret Identity
- Metal Mickey
- Wonder Why?
- Spatz
- Knightmare
- Mr. Dressup
- Lassie
- Mr. Wizard's World
- Under the Umbrella Tree
- The Banana Splits
- Rainbow
- Curiocity
- Are You Afraid of the Dark?
- Jim Henson's Mother Goose Stories
- The Voyage of the Mimi
- Mirror, Mirror
- The Curiosity Show
- Picture Pages

==== Soap Opera ====
- Hotel

==== Cooking ====
- Yan Can Cook

==== Comedy ====
- Maniac Mansion
- Too Close for Comfort
- Welcome Back, Kotter
- Growing Pains
- Full House
- Out of This World
- Hey Dad..!
- Charles in Charge
- ALF
- Mr. Belvedere
- TV's Bloopers & Practical Jokes
- Murphy Brown
- Kate & Allie
- Diff'rent Strokes
- America's Funniest Home Videos
- Good Times
- Small Wonder
- Punky Brewster
- Night Court
- Mr. Bean
- You Can't Take It with You
- Major Dad
- Family Matters
- What's Happening!!
- The Three Stooges
- Perfect Strangers
- Never the Twain
- Chance in a Million
- Benson
- Harry and the Hendersons
- McHale's Navy
- The Jeffersons
- Valerie
- Head of the Class
- Mind Your Language
- Laurel and Hardy
- Home Improvement
- Coach
- Frasier
- America's Funniest People
- My Mother the Car

==== Drama ====
- Law & Order
- Misfits of Science
- The A-Team
- Water Rats
- Bergerac
- Simon & Simon
- Doogie Howser, M.D.
- The Bionic Woman
- The Equalizer
- Sergeant Preston of the Yukon
- The Life and Times of Grizzly Adams
- Magnum, P.I.
- Five Mile Creek
- CHiPS
- Barnaby Jones
- African Skies
- Emily of New Moon
- Street Hawk
- The Knock
- Miami Vice
- L.A. Heat
- Our House
- A Year in the Life
- Bordertown
- Cop Shop
- Matlock
- RoboCop: The Series
- Zorro
- Tour of Duty
- Sirens
- Kung Fu
- Dr. Quinn, Medicine Woman
- MacGyver
- Blue Heelers
- Oshin
- Callan
- Knight Rider
- Simon & Simon
- Little House on the Prairie
- The Flying Doctors
- Barnaby Jones
- Manimal
- The Man from Snowy River
- E.N.G.
- Superboy
- Centennial
- All The Rivers Run II
- Daktari
- Sherlock Holmes
- Highlander: The Series
- A Sucessora
- The Miraculous Mellops
- Halfway Across the Galaxy and Turn Left
- Sliders

==== Documentary ====
- Rescue 911
- Tomorrow's World
- Ripley's Believe It or Not!
- Lorne Greene's New Wilderness
- The World About Us
- New! Animal World

==== Reality ====
- That's Incredible!
- Candid Camera

==== Game shows ====
- Treasure Hunt
- Interceptor
- You've Been Framed!
- Telematch
- Win, Lose or Draw
- Give Us a Clue
- Lingo
- The Crystal Maze
- Take Your Pick!

==== Variety ====
- The Mickey Mouse Club

==== Anthology ====
- The Wonderful World of Disney

==== Education ====
- Beyond 2000
- Wonderstruck
- Encyclopedia Britannica

==== Magic ====
- The Paul Daniels Magic Show

==== Sports ====
- Trans World Sport
- Gillette World Sport Special
