= Widget (TV series) =

American animated TV series

- Widget
- Genre: Animated comedy
- Created by: Peter Keefe
- Directed by: Tom Burton
- Presented by: Calico Creations; Zodiac Entertainment
- Voices of: Russi Taylor; Jim Cummings; Kath Soucie; Dana Hill
- Theme music composer: Dale Schacker
- Country of origin: United States
- Original language: English
- No. of seasons: 2
- No. of episodes: 65

Production
- Executive producer: Peter Keefe
- Producer: Tom Burton
- Running time: 30 minutes
- Production companies: Calico Creations; Zodiac Entertainment

Original release
- Network: Syndication; USA Network
- Release: 29 September 1990 – 25 April 1992

Widget (also known as Widget the World Watcher) is an American animated children's television series created by Peter Keefe, and directed and produced by Tom Burton of Zodiac Entertainment, which debuted in syndication on September 29, 1990. The series ran for two seasons; in the first season (1990), it aired once a week (usually on Saturday or Sunday), and in the second season (1991-1992), the series expanded to weekdays. The show featured environmentalist themes and was recognized by the National Education Association as recommended viewing for children.

== Overview ==
The show focused on a short purple extraterrestrial from the planet Widget who could shapeshift by spinning like a spinning top into different forms. He and a group of young human friends - brothers Kevin and Brian, and their veterinarian friend Kristine - protect the natural environment from those who wish to plunder or harm it. Later on they are joined by fellow shapeshifter Half-Pint, Widget's mischievous and overly-curious cousin. Widget is frequently accompanied by the Mega Brain, an intelligent but somewhat clumsy being who appears as a floating head (with a transparent cranium) and floating hands.

The show was produced by Calico Creations to teach children about the dangers of pollution. Each episode would have Widget contending with a villain from either Earth or outer space wishing to exploit Earth's environment or natural resources, like Dr. Dante, Mega Slank, and his evil twin, Ratchet. In this respect, Widget, the World Watcher is similar to Captain Planet and the Planeteers and Toxic Crusaders, as all those heroes attempt to save the Earth from ecological disaster. As in those series, Widget occasionally fought against malicious entities spawned by copious pollution. For example, in one episode Widget battled a fellow shapeshifter, a sentient but hostile life form, disguised as a toxic ooze/slick, who was contaminating Earth's beaches and oceans.

The TV series ran for 65 episodes: 13 in the first season, and 52 in the second season. The animation for the show was produced by South Korean studio Sei Young Animation.

== Main characters ==
- Widget the World Watcher (voiced by Russi Taylor) is the courageous and heroic shapeshifting heliotrope alien and the title character.
- Mega Brain (voiced by Jim Cummings) is Widget's assistant. He is a rose pink floating head with floating glove-like hands. He has a transparent brain enclosed by a dome on top of his head.
- Half-Pint (voiced by Cree Summer) is Widget's mischievous, overly-curious, hyperactive cousin, fellow shapeshifter and is the sky blue alien.
- Kevin (voiced by Dana Hill) is Brian's older brother and a friend of Widget.
- Brian (voiced by Kath Soucie) is Kevin's younger brother and a friend of Widget.
- Kristine (voiced by Kath Soucie) is Brian and Kevin's veterinarian friend and a friend of Widget.
- The Elders (voiced by Jim Cummings and Tress MacNeille) are Widget's guardians and Half Pint's uncle and aunt who give Widget an environmental emergency.
- Zodi (voiced by Pat Fraley) is an elderly World Watcher.

== Eco-villains ==
- Ratchet the World Trasher (voiced by Tress MacNeille) is a hot pink alien who is Widget's evil twin, who lives in an alternate dimension called Pollutia (or Pallinia). Whereas Widget tries to save the world, Ratchet attempts to pollute it.
- Bob and Betty (voiced by Pat Fraley and Tress MacNeille respectively) are poachers who will capture animals to earn a profit.
- Dr. Dante (voiced by Jim Cummings) is the natural earth villain and a confidence trickster scientist.
- Hubert Ratman is Doctor Dante's main minion who is willing to correct Dante most times he calls him "Ratty".
- Mega Slank (voiced by Pat Fraley) is the other natural outer space villain, who seems to have a grudge against Widget's kind and has the power to hypnotize animals.
- Flim Flam McSham is a two-headed ringmaster who captures creatures from across the universe.
- Gyp works alongside Flim Flam. She is a slave trader whose loyalty to Flim Flam is quite strong.
- Mr. Beetlebug is a businessman who will ruin the environment for money.
- Macro Brain (voiced by Jim Cummings) is a supercomputer who was built by Mr. Beetlebug to pollute the air, and is always causing Mr. Beetlebug to sign papers and goes out of control.
- Crocorilla is a crocodile/gorilla creature, who is one of Ratchet's minions.
- Hyenaphant is an hyena/elephant creature, who is one of Ratchet's minions.
- Roostuck is a rooster/duck creature, who is one of Ratchet's minions.
- Piglion is a pig/lion creature, who is one of Ratchet's minions.
- Bizzaro Brain (voiced by Jim Cummings) is a floating head with a transparent brain who will do anything in his will to best Mega Brain.

== Episodes ==
=== Season 1 (1990) ===
No. overall	No. in season	Title	Written by	Original release date
1	1	"Widget's Great Whale Adventure"	Doug Lefler & Lynn Lefler	29 September 1990
Widget reluctantly travels to Earth and he saves a whale caught by some poachers.
2	2	"Gorilla My Dreams"	Pamela Hickey & Dennys McCoy	6 October 1990
On a school trip, Kevin and Brian adopt a gorilla named Johnny Africa.
3	3	"Kona, the Captive Whale"	Lynn Lefler & Doug Lefler	13 October 1990
On a trip with Kevin, Brian, and Kristine, Widget assumes the zookeeper of a baby whale named Kona is hurting her, while really the zookeeper is just doing his job.
4	4	"Widget of the Jungle"	Pamela Hickey & Dennys McCoy	20 October 1990
Widget travels to the jungles of Africa where evil poachers, Bob and Betty, try to capture an elephant for his tusks.
5	5	"Widget's Walkabout"	Lynn Lefler & Doug Lefler	27 October 1990
Widget travels to Australia to ensure its red kangaroos enjoy their new habitat.
6	6	"Amazon Adventure"	Larry Bischof & William Brian Lowry	3 November 1990
Construction men are building a giant highway through the rainforest, cutting down special trees used by the natives as medicine.
7	7	"Mediterranean Adventure"	Doug Lefler & Lynn Lefler	10 November 1990
A trip to the Mediterranean Sea gets Kevin, Brian, Kristine, and Mega Brain captured by fishermen, while Widget has to help out a cattle farmer.
8	8	"Slime Sleuths"	Larry Bischof & William Brian Lowry	17 November 1990
Dr. Dante presumably has invented a machine to solve the issue of toxic waste disposal. Widget wonders about that when problems arise when the barrels containing the waste are reused.
9	9	"Rock 'n' Roll Widget"	Lynn Lefler & Doug Lefler	24 November 1990
Kristine takes Widget, Brian and Kevin to a rock concert which is seemingly a charity for marine life, little knowing the concert was being run by Mr. Beetlebug.
10	10	"Teacher's Pets"	Richard Merwin	1 December 1990
Widget gets to be the children's substitute teacher of biology and zoology after their regular substitute teacher Mr. Scramblejank keeps having car trouble, but Samantha soon becomes a tattletale.
11	11	"The Carnival Kids"	Doug Lefler & Lynn Lefler	8 December 1990
A carnival is being thrown by Doctor Clang, seemingly for building an animal shelter.
12	12	"Mega-Slank from Titanium"	Richard Merwin	15 December 1990
The evil Mega Slank steals animals to bring back to his planet.
13	13	"That's the Spirit"	Richard Merwin	22 December 1990
While planning to demolish a town's fountain for a mall, the mayor is visited by three Ghosts.

=== Season 2 (1991–92) ===
No. overall	No. in season	Title	Written by	Original release date
14	1	"Two Times Widget Equals Trouble"	Tony Marino	23 September 1991
A careless mistake by Mega Brain sends Ratchet, Widget's alter ego, out to trash.
15	2	"You Talkin' to Me?"	Richard Merwin	25 September 1991
Mega Brain invents a machine which supposedly cleans the air, but it actually makes animals talk like humans, leaving Widget to no longer be the only one who could understand them.
16	3	"Sort It Out"	Larry Bischof & William Brian Lowry	27 September 1991
Widget teaches the city people how to recycle after seeing recyclables at the dump.
17	4	"Watcher's Warning"	Tony Marino	30 September 1991
Widget, Mega Brain, Kevin and Brian travel to Planet Scraboolee which is completely polluted and used to be beautiful. Widget wants to get proof of its pollution to ensure the same thing does not happen to Earth, but it is not going to be an easy task.
18	5	"The Great Brain Robbery"	Tony Marino	1 October 1991
Ratchet captures Mega Brain and turns him into a mindless trasher.
19	6	"The Greatest Show in the Galaxy"	Michael Maurer	2 October 1991
After a video recording of Widget is sent into space, ringmaster brothers Film Flam McSham capture Widget for their intergalactic circus.
20	7	"Bonkrz"	Marc Handler	7 October 1991
Widget travels to an award show to help Squappy the Sapsimian, who is seemingly endangered, but Widget finds out the air on the planet had acid rain.
21	8	"Glacier Grabber"	Larry Bischof & William Brian Lowry	10 October 1991
Widget, Mega Brain, Kevin, and Brian find that Dr. Dante is in the arctic with a supposedly harmless machine. Widget finds out that the machine is melting all the glaciers.
22	9	"Where's the Beef?"	Richard Merwin	11 October 1991
Mega Slank goes to Australia and hypnotizes animals to run his fast food company.
23	10	"Micronauts"	Tony Marino	14 October 1991
Widget and friends try to stop mysterious rain that mutates anything into giant monsters.
24	11	"Watcher from Wayback"	Larry Bischof & William Brian Lowry	15 October 1991
Widget travels to Tibet and unexpectedly meets an old World Watcher named Zodi.
25	12	"Betty and the Beasts"	Michael Maurer	17 October 1991
Bob and Betty are capturing animals to make a movie.
26	13	"Maller Crawlers"	Marc Handler	22 October 1991
Widget goes to an intergalactic shopping mall and finds out that the mall is no ordinary mall.
27	14	"Never Cry Woof"	Richard Merwin	24 October 1991
Brian is accidentally turned into a wolf by Mega Brain.
28	15	"All Day Suckers"	Gordon Kent	25 October 1991
A race of lollipop people seek water and goes to a greedy businessman who is draining out Earth's water.
29	16	"Fifty Foot Ants"	Michael Maurer	29 October 1991
It is Kevin's birthday and Mega Brain tells a story about giant ants and Flim Flam McSham trying to capture one.
30	17	"Half-Pint"	Marc Handler	30 October 1991
Widget's little cousin named Half Pint arrives on Earth and visits him, but unlike Widget, he is rather hyperactive.
31	18	"Air For Sale"	Larry Bischof & William Brian Lowry	1 November 1991
Mr. Beetlebug opens Domeworld and starts polluting the air using a supercomputer named Macro Brain in order to sell air for money.
32	19	"Intergalactic Garage Sale"	Richard Merwin	5 November 1991
Evil Mega Slank steals many of Earth's most magnificent landmarks for his Intergalactic Garage Sale.
33	20	"The Great Brain Drain"	Michael Maurer	6 November 1991
The Watcher Elders inform Widget that Bizarro Brain is causing mayhem in the time of the dinosaurs by trying to capture the Whaleosaurus and Mega Brain is afraid to help.
34	21	"Dr. M-Slank's Pet Palace"	Richard Merwin	7 November 1991
Mega Slank is capturing animals from the vet to run his machine.
35	22	"Murtle & Zurtle"	Larry Bischof & Wiliam Brian Lowry	11 November 1991
Widget time travels to reunite a Galapagos turtle couple from a group of pirates.
36	23	"Ratchet Hood"	Tony Marino	14 November 1991
Ratchet and his minions steal money intended for the Clean the Earth foundation and Ratchet keeps the money to himself.
37	24	"Crazy 8"	Marc Handler	15 November 1991
Mega Brain suggests that Half Pint could have fun at an intergalactic carnival, but when they get there, it is full of strange people and things.
38	25	"Half-Pint's Ransom"	Marc Handler	18 November 1991
When Half Pint goes to stay with Widget, he gets into lots of mischief with his teleportation device when he is taken by Bob and Betty.
39	26	"Whatsit to You?"	Richard Merwin	19 November 1991
Mega Slank builds a bunch of Widget robots to pollute Earth and frame Widget the World Watcher for the mess.
40	27	"Widget and the Sqizzlebonk"	Michael Maurer	22 November 1991
Film Flam McSham tries to enslave the Squizzlebonk, a gluttonous monster, and Widget does his best to protect the Squizzlebonk due to it being the last of its kind.
41	28	"Chaos in Kali-Ko"	Larry Bischof & William Brian Lowry	25 November 1991
Dr. Dante is building a giant park at Kali-Ko, and hypnotizes Widget into thinking he works for him.
42	29	"Head Game"	Tony Marino	27 November 1991
Ratchet challenges Mega Brain to a set of games against a giant brain in which is not too bright.
43	30	"MacBluff"	Marc Handler	29 November 1991
Widget and Half Pint go to a planet where a war is about to occur, and are willing to stop it, but things get harder when their king puts on a play.
44	31	"Great Barrier Thief"	Larry Bischof & William Brian Lowry	2 December 1991
Poachers Bob and Betty are capturing sea life in the Great Barrier Reef and kidnap Mega Brain. Widget enlists the help of some singing aquatic sea animals.
45	32	"The Brain Who Would Be King"	Larry Bischof & William Brian Lowry	4 December 1991
Widget the World Watcher and Mega Brain time travel to the time of the dinosaurs and find out that the dinosaurs died out due to the asteroid polluting the air, and then travel to the time of the cave persons, with the cave persons making Mega Brain their king until they decide he is cosmically uncool.
46	33	"The Uncontrollable Urg"	Marc Handler	6 December 1991
On a Watcher Scout trip, Widget, Half Pint, and Brian hear the story of the Urg, an always angry shapeshifting monster that lives on Widget's home planet that limits his vocabulary to his name.
47	34	"Intergalactic Grudge Match"	Tony Marino	9 December 1991
In order to stop Ratchet from polluting Earth, Widget agrees to an intergalactic grudge match against Garbantua, a giant alien wrestler, with one catch, which is that Widget must not shapeshift at any point.
48	35	"Teeny, Weeny, Widget"	Larry Bischof & William Brian Lowry	10 December 1991
Widget suggests that Kevin and Brian visit the agricultural fair, held by Flim Flam McSham. Widget is separated from the others when he is shrunken to the size of a mouse.
49	36	"Scraboolee Jubilee"	Tony Marino	12 December 1991
The Scrabooleeans kidnap Mega Brain for their Scraboolee Jubilee and have their own fun with him.
50	37	"Culture Crooks"	Marc Handler	17 December 1991
Ratchet and his mutant minions have stolen an ancient artefact from the museum and travels back in time to steal some more. It is up to Widget, Mega Brain, and Half Pint to time travel to get it back.
51	38	"The Library Card"	Larry Bischof & William Brian Lowry	19 December 1991
Widget, Mega Brain, Kevin, and Brian are at the library, and Widget is to get a library card, and while waiting for it, Widget and friends read the stories and imagine themselves as part of those stories.
52	39	"Bonkula"	Michael Maurer	20 December 1991
A no-good prankster vampire named Bonkula befriends Kevin and becomes a bad influence to him.
53	40	"Ratchetland"	Tony Marino	25 January 1992
Ratchet has stolen everybody's trash cans and waste to make his own amusement park in the waste dump and even turning the visitors into pigs. Widget and Mega Brain must find out what is making the visitors enjoy the garbage-filled theme park.
54	41	"Rose Colored Glasses"	Marc Handler	8 February 1992
Widget, Mega Brain and Half Pint travel to Planet Narcissis where a war is occurring, and Widget soon realizes it is because of the Narcissians wearing rose-coloured glasses.
55	42	"Crashing Planets"	Larry Bischof & WIlliam Brian Lowry	15 February 1992
A planet is on a collision course with Earth, and Widget the World Watcher and Mega Brain are trying their best to change the planet's course.
56	43	"Robo-Zonk"	Michael Maurer	22 February 1992
Mega Brain creates a robot named Robo-Zonk, who instantly befriends Half Pint. When Half Pint creates more robots, they go against him and it is up to Widget to stop them.
57	44	"Ghost of a Chance"	Richard Merwin	29 February 1992
In an environmental takeoff of A Christmas Carol, Widget is visited by three ghosts, a Viking who engaged in deforestation, an American pioneer who participated in the buffalo slaughter, and a British big game hunter who contributed to extinction of some animals. The ghosts tell Widget that they are punished until they teach a living person of their wrong acts, and Widget sees their chance for atonement when the city's mayor is making a secret deal for a polluting factory to be built.
58	45	"Rock Around the Cosmos"	Michael Maurer	7 March 1992
A parody of Star Wars, Widget goes after Flim Flam after an evil plan staged by Bizarro Brain spirals out of control. They are helped by Princess Aleian (Widget has a crush on her), who is used against her will by Bizarro Brain to destroy Earth.
59	46	"The Wishing Stone"	Richard Merwin	14 March 1992
Widget travels to Africa and meets a woman named Cleo, who tells them that Professor Geekman is planning to steal a stone that grants wishes.
60	47	"Time Trippers"	Tony Marino	21 March 1992
Widget and Mega Brain try to travel to the year 9901 after seeing an old news report on how Ratchet made his mutants and turned Planet Pallinia into Planet Pollutia, but after realizing they had travelled to the year 1066, Widget hopes to stop Ratchet from his scheme.
61	48	"Bungle of the Jungle"	Michael Maurer	28 March 1992
Bob and Betty build a robotic elephant in order to destroy a jungle and find a priceless artefact.
62	49	"Machine Planet"	Tony Marino	4 April 1992
Widget and Half Pint travel to a Machine Planet and try to save the machines that are ready for destruction.
63	50	"Awesome African Adventure"	Richard Merwin	11 April 1992
Widget and Mega Brain go to the African rain forest to aide the last dinosaur of its kind from a poacher.
64	51	"Beast Side Story"	Michael Maurer	18 April 1992
A fox that lives on the streets is captured by a gang of weasels and Widget must save them when Mr. Beetlebug plans to destroy their home, which is an abandoned apartment building.
65	52	"Mother Slank's Intergalactic Vacation Paradise"	Richard Merwin	25 April 1992
Mega Slank's mother takes an underwater vacation at Lake Titicaca and their submarine is ruining it.

== Principal cast ==
- Jim Cummings - Mega Brain, Dr. Dante, Elder #1, Bizzaro Brain, Macro Brain, Flim Flam McSham
- Dana Hill - Kevin
- Kath Soucie - Brian, Kristine, Princess Aleian
- Russi Taylor - Widget, Baby

=== Additional voices ===
- Cam Clarke
- Townsend Coleman
- Peter Cullen - Rooney Kangaroo, Gdunu, Mr. Beetlebug, Hubert Ratman,
- Brian Cummings
- Pat Fraley - Mega Slank, Bob the Poacher
- Tress MacNeille - Ratchet, Elder #2, Betty the Poacher, Mother Slank
- Cree Summer - Half Pint, Cleo

== Production and distribution ==
Widget was produced by Zodiac Entertainment, a Studio City, California-based firm backed by British media company Central Independent Television. Zodiac President Kevin Morrison stated that in 1990, Widget was being broadcast on 80% of independent television stations in the United States. By 1991, Widget started being shown five times a week.

It also aired on TVO and Le Canal Famille in Canada and later on ITV, The Children's Channel, Sky One and Channel 4 in the UK, TV3 in Sweden, RTÉ1 and RTÉ2 in Ireland, Sjónvarpið in Iceland, Fun Channel in Chile, Bop TV, SABC 1 and M-Net in South Africa, Saudi 2 in Saudi Arabia, Dubai 33 in the United Arab Emirates, KBS, KBS2 and American Forces Korea Network in Korea, Syndication, USA Network and UniMás (with the Spanish-dubbed version aired on Toonturama weekend morning block) in United States, TV1 and TV3 in Malaysia, Channel 55 in Bahrain, Canal+ and FR3 in France, ZBC TV in Zimbabwe, Channel One in Russia, Channel 5 in Singapore, KUAM-TV in Guam, NBC in Namibia, Swazi TV in Eswatini, TVP1, TVP2 and TVP Polonia in Poland, TV2 and TV3 in New Zealand, ProSieben and Armed Forces Network (with the original English recorded version) in Germany, TV3 in Estonia, IBC in the Philippines, RTB in Brunei, Canale 5 in Italy, Channel 2 in Israel, the ABC in Australia, Canal Panda in Spain and ANT1 in Greece.

== Video games ==
The series spawned two video games. Widget was released on the NES in 1992 and Super Widget on the SNES in 1993, both published by Atlus.

== Home media ==
Widget was released on VHS in multiple countries. In the US, two VHS releases were published, one featuring Widget's Great Whale Adventure and Gorilla My Dreams, and the other featuring Widget of the Jungle and Kona the Captive Whale.

The series had five VHS releases in Australia by ABC Video, and thus, a clip from Widget's Walkabout was featured in an ABC For Kids VHS promo from 1993-1997.

- Widget's Great Whale Adventure and The Great Brain Robbery (24 August 1992)
- Widget's Walkabout and Intergalactic Garage Sale (22 March 1993)
- Great Barrier Thief and Amazon Adventure (21 June 1993)
- Slime Sleuths and Ratchet Hood (20 September 1993)
- Widget of the Jungle and Mega Slank from Titanium (25 July 1994)

== Reception ==
=== Accolades ===
The episode "Sort it Out" won an Environmental Media Award.
