= World Events Productions =

American entertainment company

WEP LLC
- Current logo, featuring a silhouette of Voltron
- Trade name: World Events Productions
- Company type: Private
- Industry: Entertainment
- Founded: 1980; 46 years ago
- Headquarters: St. Louis, Missouri, United States
- Key people: Ted Koplar; Peter Keefe
- Products: Anime, cartoons
- Subsidiaries: Calico Entertainment
- Website: wep.com voltron.com

WEP LLC, doing business as World Events Productions, is an American animation and distribution company in St. Louis, Missouri, best known for releasing the anime titles Voltron, Defender of the Universe and Saber Rider and the Star Sheriffs, as well as producing the original animated series Denver, the Last Dinosaur.

== History ==
Founded in 1980 by Ted Koplar, son of St. Louis businessman and KPLR-TV founder Harold Koplar, World Events Productions, Ltd. started out as a "current events" program on the TV station titled World Events.

In 1982, Koplar teamed with Jack Galmiche and Frank Babcock to produce three nationally syndicated shows featuring Kickboxing. The shows were produced and distributed nationally from St Louis, Las Vegas, and New York's Madison Square Garden.

In 1983, while attending a science fiction convention, Ted Koplar discovered the anime series Beast King GoLion and saw a potential in distributing it on U.S. television. WEP licensed the series from Toei Animation and released it in 1984 in an edited and English-dubbed form as Voltron. The show was met with high ratings nationwide. After airing all episodes of GoLion, WEP adapted Armored Fleet Dairugger XV into the second season of Voltron. The second season lacked the ratings of the first season, as viewers were more used to the GoLion team. In response, WEP commissioned Toei Animation to produce 20 more episodes of the GoLion-based Voltron.

In 1987, WEP licensed Star Musketeer Bismark from Studio Pierrot and released it as Saber Rider and the Star Sheriffs. The series was rewritten with several episodes rearranged or omitted; in addition, six new episodes were animated for the U.S. version. Despite lacking the popularity of Voltron, Saber Rider has received a cult fan following throughout the years; most prominently in Germany.

After years of licensing and broadcasting anime, WEP ventured to original animated works. In 1988, the company released Denver, the Last Dinosaur, which was met with positive feedback from parents' groups and was recommended by the National Education Association. Vytor: The Starfire Champion was released in 1989. Despite being an International Film and Video Festival and a New York Festival Award winner, the show's run on television was short-lived.

In 1998, WEP revisited the Voltron franchise with an all-new TV series. Voltron: The Third Dimension was the 3-D animated sequel to the original series, featuring some of the original voice cast plus actors Clancy Brown and Tim Curry. Despite winning a Daytime Emmy Award for Outstanding Sound Editing, the series received mixed responses from critics and fans of the original series.

In 2008, World Events licensed the original GoLion and Dairugger XV in the U.S.

In 2010, Classic Media (now DreamWorks Classics) acquired distribution rights for the Voltron franchise.

WEP, Kickstart Productions and Classic Media released an all-new animated Voltron series titled Voltron Force in June 2011. The series takes place sometime after events in the original series and aired on Nicktoons.

== Legal issues ==
World Events Productions settled a legal dispute with Toei Animation in 2010 over copyright infringements of a potential live-action Voltron movie. In the past, both companies disputed when Voltron: The Third Dimension was released. The previous dispute was settled in 2000, with WEP acquiring the animated properties Voltron and GoLion, as well as 'Vehicle Force Voltron' and 'Dairugger'. The most recent legal issues between the two companies focus on WEP's right to adapt the anime into live-action and possibly marketing it in Japan. As a result of this dispute, 20th Century Fox and New Regency Productions pulled out of the live-action project.

In July 2009, Atlas Entertainment acquired the live-action film rights. This prompted film producers James Young, Ford Oelman and Mark Costa to file a lawsuit against World Events Productions, claiming that their companies - Animus Films and NHO Entertainment - have held exclusive live-action rights to Voltron since 2004. The live-action project was eventually scrapped in June 2010 in favor of a new Voltron television series. On November 4, 2016, three months after the completion of NBCUniversal's acquisition of Classic Media's parent company, DreamWorks Animation for $3.8 billion, it was announced that Universal Pictures and DreamWorks Animation will make the film with David Hayter writing the script.

== Filmography ==
- Voltron (1984–1985)
  - Adaptation of Toei Animation's Beast King GoLion and Armored Fleet Dairugger XV.
- Voltron: Fleet of Doom (1986)
  - One-off crossover of both Voltron seasons co-produced by Toei Animation.
- Saber Rider and the Star Sheriffs (1987–1988)
  - Adaptation of Studio Pierrot's Star Musketeer Bismarck
- Denver, the Last Dinosaur (1988)
  - WEP's first all-original work.
- Vytor: The Starfire Champion (1989)
- Widget the World Watcher (1990–1991) (co-production)
- Mr. Bogus (1991–1993)
- The Moo Family Holiday Hoedown (1992)
  - Christmas special
- Bubsy pilot (1993)
- Twinkle the Dream Being (1993–1994)
- The New Adventures of Voltron (1994–1995)
  - Original "Voltron" episodes created for the North American market without Toei Animation's involvement. The following "Voltron" series would also be produced without the involvement of the original Japanese creators.
- This Land Is Your Land: The Animated Kids' Songs of Woody Guthrie (1997)
  - Video short
- Bad Baby pilot (1997)
- Voltron: The Third Dimension (1998–2000)
  - 3D animated sequel to Voltron co-produced by Mike Young Productions
- Voltron Force (2011–2012)
  - Co-produced by Kickstart Productions and DreamWorks Classics.
- Voltron: Legendary Defender (2016–2018)
  - Co-produced by DreamWorks Animation Television.
- Denver the Last Dinosaur (2018)
  - CGI production co-produced by Zagtoon

=== Live-action films ===
- Voltron live-action film
  - A live-action film, based on the series produced through DreamWorks Animation, will be released through Amazon MGM Studios
