= Saber Rider and the Star Sheriffs =

Animated television space Western

- Screenshot of the title screen from Saber Rider and the Star Sheriffs
- Genre: Space Western, mecha
- Created by: World Events Productions
- Based on: Star Musketeer Bismark by Studio Pierrot
- Directed by: Franklin Cofod
- Voices of: Rob Paulsen; Pat Fraley; Townsend Coleman; Pat Musick; Peter Cullen
- Music by: Dale Schacker
- Countries of origin: United States; Japan
- Original language: English
- No. of seasons: 1
- No. of episodes: 52

Production
- Executive producer: Peter Keefe
- Producers: Franklin Cofod; Courtney Leigh; Kimberly Frances
- Production companies: World Events Productions; Studio Pierrot

Original release
- Network: First-run syndication
- Release: September 14, 1987 – September 2, 1988

Saber Rider and the Star Sheriffs is an animated television space Western, similar to the series The Adventures of the Galaxy Rangers and BraveStarr. The series premiered in the United States in 1987 and had a run of 52 episodes.

The show was based on Star Musketeer Bismarck (星銃士ビスマルク, Seijūshi Bisumaruku), a Japanese anime series created by Studio Pierrot that achieved moderate success in Japan. The English language rights to the series were purchased by World Events Productions (WEP), the same company behind the English-language version of Voltron, in 1986. WEP reorganized and rewrote the series, incorporating most of the original episodes with some editions and creating 6 new ones, before releasing it under the name Saber Rider and the Star Sheriffs. The name is a bit erronous, since the main character does not wield a saber (curved cavalry sword), but a pallasch (straight cavalry sword).

== Plot ==
"Together we've made a commitment to the spirit of the frontier freedom fighters. Wherever danger leads us, wherever the people need us, that's where you'll find...the Star Sheriffs!"

— from the episode "Star Sheriff Round-Up"

The series is set in the distant future. Humans have spread beyond living on Earth and have colonized planets across the universe, creating a New Frontier of man. In order to protect these new settlers and maintain law and order in the New Frontier, Earth's Cavalry Command was created. Cavalry Command is a military organization that maintains an army and fleet of ships to protect the New Frontier and the residents of the planets within it known as Settlers. Within Cavalry Command is a unit of special operatives known as Star Sheriffs that function as the organization's field agents, investigating any crimes and plots that threaten the security of the New Frontier.

The main foe of Cavalry Command and the Star Sheriffs is a race of non-human creatures known as Vapor Beings (also sometimes called Outriders) that have jumped into our dimension in order to conquer it. They attack the Settlers, destroy settlements, and kidnap humans in order to mine various metals or crystals from the soil of various planets.

Outriders are superior to humans in battle technology. They control a legion of gigantic robots ("Renegade Units") with weapons greatly superior to the weapons and defenses of the space-going fleets of Cavalry Command. In response to the Outriders's threat, Cavalry Command develops a prototype spaceship known as the "Ramrod Equalizer Unit" (or simply Ramrod) that has the ability to transform from a spaceship into a powerful robot that can fight the Outriders's Renegade Units on equal terms.

== Characters ==
=== Protagonists ===
Saber Rider
Original name: Richard Lancelot
The title character in the American version of the series, Saber Rider is the team's leader and captain of the Ramrod Equalizer Unit. He is occasionally referred to by the nickname "Top Sword." He is a young man, yet is described as having legendary sword skills and marksmanship. Saber Rider hails from the Scottish Highlands and is an expert with both swords and horses. He is generally depicted as being a gentleman with a cool head for tactics and decision-making. The American version retained the British Union Jack on the upper arm and the helmet design of Saber Rider's armored uniform; this helmet's design appears to incorporate a bearskin hat.
Saber Rider often rides a robotic horse, responding to the name of "Steed," who has high–powered thrusters, and the ability to fly, run, and function in space. Steed is not capable of long–range space travel, so he is kept stored in Ramrod's cargo bay during journeys. He is used mainly to travel to planets from orbit, or utilized on a planet's surface. Steed has so sophisticated an artificial intelligence as almost to be sentient, as he is capable of recognizing his master's voice commands, and working independently when Saber Rider is in danger.
He is voiced by Rob Paulsen.
Fireball
Original name: Shinji Hikari
Fireball, a former race car driver, was the youngest driving champion in history. He now serves as the pilot of the Ramrod Equalizer Unit, and also has secondary control of the heavy weaponry located in Ramrod's chest region. He drives the "Red Fury Turbo Racer," a race car armed with an extensive arsenal of weapons. He has a somewhat quick temper, and at one time boasted of having a perfect memory. In the original Sei Jūshi Bismarck, Fireball is the Japanese leader of the crew. The Japanese flag is on his sleeve and his helmet.
During the course of the series, he discovers that his father was a fighter pilot who fought alongside King Jaray of the Legendary Kingdom of Jarr when the Outriders first attacked fifteen years prior to the series's time frame. Sacrificing himself, Fireball's father sent his ship into Nemesis's command ship, robbing Nemesis of his body and sending them both into the Outrider dimension, where he remained lost as of the time frame of the series.
Coincidentally or not, Fireball's real name is strikingly similar to Shinji Ikari of Evangelion.
He is voiced by Pat Fraley.
Colt
Original name: William "Bill" Willcox
Colt is introduced in the series as a bounty hunter on the trail of Vanquo, an Outrider spy. Colt has an almost infallible accuracy with firearms and serves as the gunner on board Ramrod. His character is depicted as somewhat of a loner, but also as an outrageous flirt; he flirts with nearly every woman he meets. His parents were attacked and presumably killed by Outriders just after Colt left to join a traveling rodeo. This event prompted him to become a bounty hunter.
For personal transportation and solo battles he uses a blue and white one-man spaceship he calls the "Bronco Buster." In Sei Jūshi Bismarck, the character comes from the United States, therefore a US flag is seen as a patch on his armored uniform; the design of the armor's helmet incorporates a simulation of a "ten-gallon hat."
He is voiced by Townsend Coleman.
Commander Charles Eagle
Original name: Charles Louvre
Commander Eagle is the leader of Cavalry Command, which includes all of the fleets and armies that protect the United Star Systems, including the Star Sheriffs. Charles takes his responsibilities seriously, but underneath has a warm heart and caring nature.
He is voiced by Peter Cullen.
April Eagle
Original name: Marianne Louvre
April Eagle is the daughter of Commander Charles Eagle. She is the engineer who designed, and was in charge of, Project Ramrod. Before joining the Star Sheriffs, she was a professional tennis player. She was trained at Cavalry Command under General Whitehawk. April has a robotic horse, responding to the name of "Nova;" who has the abilities (and, presumably, the limitations) of Saber Rider's Steed.
April is the subject of several romantic plot arcs. In early episodes of the series, April had an unrequited crush on Richard a.k.a. Saber Rider. In later episodes, Jesse Blue had an unrequited love interest in April. Finally, April and Shinji did begin a romantic relationship. Unlike most similar series, in Saber Rider and the Star Sheriffs the heroine does not end up in a romantic relationship with the main hero. This is because her eventual love interest, Shinji a.k.a. Fireball, was the hero in the original Japanese version.
In the Japanese version, April is French, which is why her armored uniform bears the French tricolor.
She is voiced by Pat Musick.
Ramrod
Original name: Bismark
The Ramrod was developed by April Eagle as the technological "miracle weapon" that would allow humans to counter the threat of the Outriders. Although it can be flown by one person, the ship is designed to be operated by four people, each sitting in separate units that control specific functions: navigation (April), weapons (Colt), pilot (Fireball) and the commander/tactician (Saber Rider).
A highlight of nearly every episode is Ramrod's transformation from an airborne battleship into a giant fighting robot. When the Ramrod Equalizer Unit undergoes the "Challenge Phase" (usually activated by Fireball pressing a button in the center of his unit console), April calls out that Ramrod is taking over the navigational controls during the transformation. Ramrod acknowledges this while the 4 control units are shifted to new positions inside of Ramrod's head. As it completes the transformation it calls out its rallying cry in a heavy Western drawl, "Head 'em up, move 'em out...power stride, and ready to ride." The Ramrod vehicle will transform into a giant robot packing an over-sized six-shooter at the hip and appears to be wearing a cowboy hat and a cape. The battle conversion to robot form is used mainly when the Star Sheriffs encounter the Outriders' giant robots, which are known as either a Renegade or Desperado Unit. In "Maverick Quick-draw" mode, an array of assorted cannons will be deployed at Ramrod's chest, delivering the final blow to send an Outrider "Renegade Unit" back to the Vapor Zone. The Star Sheriffs sometimes refer to Ramrod's robot form as the "Big Sheriff."
In the final episodes of the series, the original Ramrod was dismantled as part of a peace treaty brokered between the Outriders and Cavalry Command. However, when the Outriders broke the treaty by attempting to invade the New Frontier dimension, Cavalry Command issued the Star Sheriffs a more powerful version of Ramrod known as "Ramrod 2" with double the power of the original. Ramrod 2's Challenge Phase transformation was the same as the original Ramrod, only April now said "Ramrod 2 will now take navigational control."
Ramrod was named Bismarck in the Japanese version, hence the series' name Sei Jūshi Bismarck. The Americanized name for the battleship possibly originates from a cowboy slang referring to the person-in-charge of an outfit, the leader of the pack, or the person who gets the job done.
The Ramrod Equalizer Unit Challenge Phase is essentially the sequence in which Saber Rider And The Star Sheriffs becomes similar to a "monster-fighter (kaiju) series;" otherwise the series, in American form, is mainly Western-oriented.
It is voiced by Peter Cullen in imitation of John Wayne.

=== Antagonists ===
The main antagonists are called the Outriders who are humanoids from the Vapor Zone, an alternate dimension. They do not require oxygen, but do require great quantities of water. They have the ability to disguise themselves as human beings, to the point where even a medical examination will not reveal their true identities.

Their personal existence is bleak, as is their home dimension. They have squandered all the resources on their home planet, forcing them to move to an artificial planet. The Outriders' goal is to conquer mankind and control the universe unhindered—they think the human dimension has much more to offer than their own. When an Outrider is shot or wounded, they do not die, but rather dimension jump, a process where they vanish and return to their home dimension. After dimension jumping, a wisp of poisonous, green gas, and a smudge where the Outrider stood remain. A self-initiated dimension jump leaves no trace at all. Outriders who are shot or killed in the vapor dimension will turn to a human. Under unique circumstances an Outrider, while in the human dimension, is in a situation that prevents them from making a dimension jump may also turn them to a human.

Nemesis
Original name: Hyuza
Nemesis, a huge, darkly clad, masked being, is the evil genius in charge of the renegade Outriders. He created the Vapor Trail that allows the Outriders to cross from their dimension into the human dimension. His primary motivation for ordering an invasion of the New Frontier is the unbearable boredom he feels in the Vapor Dimension. In the last episodes of the series it is revealed Nemesis is a cyborg, and his consciousness also existed as the Nth Degree, a powerful computer on the Outrider's artificial homeworld.
Saber Rider is the only member of the Star Sheriffs to meet Nemesis one-on-one. In the episode "Stampede", the two faced each other in a laser sword duel after Saber crossed into the Vapor Zone in the wake of an Outrider ship travelling along the Vapor Trail. When Saber Rider was on the verge of winning the duel, Nemesis saved himself by emptying the oxygen from the chamber where they were fighting, rendering Saber Rider unconscious.
He is voiced by Peter Cullen.
Jesse Blue
Original name: Perios
Jesse Blue is a man with odd traits; he has blue-green hair and a sarcastic streak. He was a promising cadet at Cavalry Command, until he fell in love with April Eagle during a training exercise. When April rejected his advances and inadvertently embarrassed him in front of the other cadets, he turned against the Star Sheriffs.
Jesse cultivated a personal grudge against Saber Rider because he thought it was April's affection for Saber Rider that made her refuse his love. He planted a bomb aboard Ramrod, in an attempt to kill Saber Rider. When he learned April would be aboard at the time it would detonate, he panicked and confessed what he'd done to Saber. While it was too late to stop the bomb from exploding, Saber Rider was able to reach Ramrod in time to prevent the ship from being destroyed. Jesse Blue escaped and became a fugitive, turning his back on Cavalry Command and joining forces with the Outriders. He became obsessed with defeating the Star Sheriffs and conquering the New Frontier.
He is voiced by Rob Paulsen in imitation of Jack Nicholson.
Gattler
Original name: Zatora
Gattler (occasionally referred to as Gattler the Rattler) wears a foreboding, fanged space mask. When his mask is removed, his form is revealed to be a glowering, dark villain. He is heavy-handed with a heart of stone, and answers only to Nemesis.
Vanquo
Vanquo is a ghostly Outrider with vacant eyes and a long pale face. He is a sinister character with a chilling laugh. Dressed in a serape and sombrero, he is an incredibly fast draw.
Vanquo ultimately had a strange fate for an Outrider: he became human. He was confronted by Saber Rider in the Vapor Zone shortly after Saber Rider's duel with Nemesis in the episode "Stampede". Vanquo presented a rather piteous figure, abandoned by Nemesis and knowing he was defeated, he was at Saber Rider's mercy. Saber Rider reasoned that if he shot Vanquo inside the Vapor Zone, he would not be able to dimension jump and reform anew since he was already in his own dimension. This meant that shooting Vanquo would make him a solid being. Saber Rider consoled Vanquo by telling him he might like being a human. Afterwards, Vanquo looked down at his new human body and said, in somewhat teary happiness, "I think I might."

=== Supporting characters ===
Additional characters include Buck (voiced by Neil Ross), Grimmer (Neil Ross), Philip (Cam Clarke), Robin (Tress MacNeille), Sincia (B. J. Ward), Snake Eyes (Michael Bell), Colonel Wyatt (Lennie Weinrib), and Emily Wyeth (B. J. Ward). Peter Cullen provides the show's narration.

== Music ==
The program's music score was composed by Dale Schacker, who was given complete artistic freedom in his composition of the whole score. The score features guitar based music in a fast, rhythmic, yet very fashionable Country Western style. Despite the fact that the music uses synthpop elements, its predominant instrument is the electric guitar rather than a synthesizer, creating a unique sound. Just like a Western movie score, the music is sometimes enriched by whip cracks, rattle snake, harmonica or similar Western sound effects. The music is also intentionally composed with a recurring musical theme, so that the show can be easily recognized, adding a sense of familiarity each time the show is viewed. Despite this aspect, the music does not sound repetitious, since only key elements of the composition are repeated. The opening and closing credits vocals were also sung by Schacker himself.

Two soundtrack compilations are available, each containing 2 CDs.

- Saber Rider and the Star Sheriffs – Soundtrack I
- Saber Rider and the Star Sheriffs – Soundtrack II

== Other media ==
=== Video game ===
Saber Rider and the Star Sheriffs - The Game is an upcoming video game developed by a German group called "Team Saber Rider", under license from both World Events Productions and Studio Pierrot. The game was planned for multiple platforms, after a successful funding campaign on Kickstarter.

Originally announced in 2010, the game's development faced several problems, including the shuttering of the original developer Firehazard Studio. The head of development, Chris Strauss, originally worked on an earlier video game adaptation project, a 2D side-scrolling shooter initially planned for the Game Boy Advance, and later the Nintendo DS. However, the original game was then scrapped due to notions that more "casual" games sold better on the Nintendo DS.

=== Comic book ===
A comic miniseries based on the show was released on March 16, 2016. The four-issue miniseries is a reboot of the show's premise in order to appeal for a new generation. The miniseries is written by Mairghread Scott, and illustrated by Sendol Arts.

== VHS UK history ==
- Video Gems (Then: Little Gems) (1989–1991)

VHS video title	VHS Studios	Year of release	Episodes
Saber Rider and the Star Sheriffs – It's How the West Will Be Won	Video Gems	1989	Cavalry Command, Jesse's Revenge, Greatest Show On The New Frontier, Little Pardner

== Episodes ==
The series premiered in the United States in 1987 and had a run of 52 episodes (46 of 51 original episodes plus 6 extra episodes).

No.	Title	Original release date
1	"Star Sheriff Round Up"; Transliteration: "Uchū no Bōkenyarō" (Japanese: 宇宙の冒険野郎)	September 14, 1987
2	"Cavalry Command"	September 15, 1987
3	"Jesse's Revenge"	September 16, 1987
4	"Iguana Get To Know You"; Transliteration: "Ore to Aitsu to Ano Yarō" (Japanese: 俺とあいつとあの野郎)	September 17, 1987
5	"Little Hombre"; Transliteration: "Rasuto Shuutingu" (Japanese: ラスト・シューティング)	September 18, 1987
6	"Greatest Show On The New Frontier"; Transliteration: "Kyōfu no Robotto Shoo" (Japanese: 恐怖のロボット・ショー)	September 21, 1987
7	"Little Pardner"; Transliteration: "Chiisana Nahoankan" (Japanese: 小さな名保安官)	September 22, 1987
8	"Brawlin' Is My Callin'"; Transliteration: "Desukyuura Supai wo Ute!" (Japanese: デスキュラ・スパイを撃て!)	September 23, 1987
9	"Wild Horses Couldn't Drag Me Away"; Transliteration: "Nazo no Supeesu Hoosu" (Japanese: 謎のスペース・ホース)	September 24, 1987
10	"Castle Of The Mountain Haze"; Transliteration: "Yomigaeru Kishido" (Japanese: よみがえる騎士道)	September 25, 1987
11	"Oh Boy! Dinosaurs!"; Transliteration: "Kyōryu no Sei" (Japanese: 恐竜の星)	September 28, 1987
12	"Four Leaf Clover"; Transliteration: "Yotsuyō no Kuroobaa" (Japanese: 四つ葉のクローバー)	September 29, 1987
13	"The Highlanders"	September 30, 1987
14	"What Did You Do On Your Summer Vacation?"; Transliteration: "Saikai, Soshite Tabidachi" (Japanese: 再会、そして旅立ち)	October 1, 1987
15	"Jesse Blue"; Transliteration: "Andoromeda Kara Kita Otoko" (Japanese: アンドロメダから来た男)	October 2, 1987
16	"Show Down At Cimarron Pass"; Transliteration: "Gekitotsu! Kouya no Kessen" (Japanese: 激突!! 荒野の決戦)	October 5, 1987
17	"The Saber And The Tomahawk"	October 6, 1987
18	"All That Glitters"	October 7, 1987
19	"Sole Survivor"; Transliteration: "Bishōjo Erisu no Himitsu" (Japanese: 美少女エリスの秘密)	October 8, 1987
20	"Legend Of The Santa Fe Express"; Transliteration: "Chīsana Ai no Monogatari" (Japanese: 小さな愛の物語)	October 9, 1987
21	"Snake Eyes"; Transliteration: "Shinigami Kiddo" (Japanese: 死神キッド)	October 12, 1987
22	"Famous Last Words"; Transliteration: "Ganimede no Kishogun" (Japanese: ガニメデの鬼将軍)	October 13, 1987
23	"Sharpshooter"; Transliteration: "Oitaru Fushicho" (Japanese: 老いたる不死鳥)	October 14, 1987
24	"The Monarch Supreme"; Transliteration: "Hoshizora no Kurisumasu Karoru" (Japanese: 星空のクリスマスカロル)	October 15, 1987
25	"Gattler's Last Stand"; Transliteration: "Ganimede Saigo no Kessen" (Japanese: ガニメデ最後の決戦)	October 16, 1987
26	"Dooley"; Transliteration: "Desukyuuran Hantaa" (Japanese: デスキュラ・ハンター)	October 19, 1987
27	"The Hole In The Wall Gang"; Transliteration: "Ashita He no Takakai" (Japanese: 明日への戦い)	October 20, 1987
28	"The All Galaxy Grand Prix"; Transliteration: "Bakuhatsu!! Shi no Reesu" (Japanese: 爆発!! 死のレース)	October 21, 1987
29	"Snow-Blind"; Transliteration: "Hagukin no Kettō" (Japanese: 白銀の決闘)	October 26, 1987
30	"Tranquility"; Transliteration: "Kimi no Te De Mura wo Mamore" (Japanese: 君の手で村を守れ)	October 27, 1987
31	"Bad Day At Dry Gulch"; Transliteration: "Yūrei Sentai o Takate!" (Japanese: 幽霊戦隊を叩け!)	October 28, 1987
32	"Snowcone"; Transliteration: "Magokoro ga mieta toki" (Japanese: 真心が見えた時)	November 2, 1987
33	"Sneaky Spies"; Transliteration: "Ma no Reto Sei Fiirudo" (Japanese: 魔のレト星フィールド)	November 3, 1987
34	"Stampede"	November 4, 1987
35	"The Challenge (1)"; Transliteration: "Atanaru Ketsui Akuto Wan" (Japanese: 新たなる決意 ACT-1)	November 9, 1987
36	"The Challenge (2)"; Transliteration: "Atanaru Ketsui Akuto Tsuu" (Japanese: 新たなる決意 ACT-2)	November 10, 1987
37	"Born on the Bayou"; Transliteration: "Mōbaku! Burasutaa Purusu" (Japanese: 猛撃! ブラスター・パルス)	November 11, 1987
38	"April Rides"; Transliteration: "Go-juu Paasento no Kake" (Japanese: 50%の賭け)	November 16, 1987
39	"The Walls Of Red Wing"; Transliteration: "Wampaku Woosu!" (Japanese: わんぱくWARS!)	November 17, 1987
40	"Jesse's Girl"; Transliteration: "Jōsenshi Chiruka" (Japanese: 女戦士チルカ)	November 18, 1987
41	"The Amazing Lazardo"; Transliteration: "Jigoku Kara Kita Seija" (Japanese: 地獄から来た聖者)	August 18, 1988
42	"I Forgot"; Transliteration: "Himitsu Ansatsukeikaku o Abake" (Japanese: 秘密暗殺計画を暴け)	August 19, 1988
43	"Lend Me Your Ears"; Transliteration: "Niji ni Negai o!" (Japanese: 虹に願いを!)	August 22, 1988
44	"Born To Run"; Transliteration: "Desukyuura no Himitsu" (Japanese: デスキュラの秘密)	August 23, 1988
45	"The Legend Of The Lost World"; Transliteration: "Hoshi no Shinwa" (Japanese: 星の神話)	August 24, 1988
46	"The Rescue"; Transliteration: "Dakkai! Ruveeru Hakushi" (Japanese: 奪回! ルヴェール博士)	August 25, 1988
47	"Eagle Has Landed"; Transliteration: "Bisumaruku Kaitai" (Japanese: ビスマルク解体!)	August 26, 1988
48	"Cease Fire"; Transliteration: "Senshi no Fukkatsu" (Japanese: 戦士の復活)	August 29, 1988
49	"Alamo Moon"; Transliteration: "Haipaafoton Pōhassha" (Japanese: ハイパーフォトン砲発射!)	August 30, 1988
50	"The Nth Degree"; Transliteration: "Heruperidesu wo Gekihaseyo!" (Japanese: ヘルペリデスを撃破せよ!)	August 31, 1988
51	"Who is Nemesis?"; Transliteration: "Heruperidesu Dasshutsu" (Japanese: ヘルペリデス脱出)	September 1, 1988
52	"Happy Trails"; Transliteration: "Yume Ginga" (Japanese: 夢銀河)	September 2, 1988

== Release ==
Ten episodes of Saber Rider and the Star Sheriffs were released in America on DVD by the U.S. rights-holders, World Events Productions. Several episodes were also released on VHS. At Otakon 2008, WEP announced that the entire series would be released on DVD through VCI Entertainment. The first of three DVD sets was released on November 18, 2008. The second DVD set was released on August 25, 2009. The complete Saber Rider and the Star Sheriffs DVD boxset was released on October 20, 2009.

In the UK, one DVD, titled Saber Rider and the Star Sheriffs – Volume 1, has been released by Anchor Bay Entertainment. Two additional DVDs have been released under their Kids Entertainment label. The entire series (46 of 51-original episodes + 6 extra episodes + 5 "Lost Episodes" of Bismark) has been released in German by Anime House on 10 DVDs. Special Editions of Volumes 5 and 10 featured a slipcase to hold 5 DVDs each. A limited-edition box featuring the complete series as well as three tin figures was also released. The entire Series is also released in standard definition on Blu-ray in Germany. The First Volume was released on July 25, 2014, and the second on September 26, 2014.

On July 11, 2016, the anime-focused television channel Toku began airing the series, and months later, it was added to its Amazon Prime channel.

On January 31, 2023, it was announced the series will be released on Blu-ray by Discotek Media.
