= Twinkle, the Dream Being =

- Created by: Peter Keefe
- Directed by: Kim Dae Jung
- Voices of: Tress MacNeille; Russi Taylor; Pat Fraley; Cam Clarke
- Music by: Dale Schacker
- Countries of origin: South Korea; United States
- No. of seasons: 1
- No. of episodes: 26

Production
- Executive producer: Peter Keefe
- Producer: Kim Dae Jung
- Editors: Janet "Lime" Limenstoll; Rob DeSales
- Running time: 30 minutes per episode
- Production companies: Sei Young Anitel; MBC Production; Zodiac Entertainment

Original release
- Network: Syndication (United States); MBC TV (South Korea); CITV and The Children's Channel (United Kingdom)
- Release: September 18, 1993 – April 2, 1994

Twinkle, the Dream Being is an American animated television series that aired in 1993 in syndication in the U.S. and MBC TV in South Korea for Daejeon Expo 1993. The show was produced by Zodiac Entertainment, Sei Young Anitel and Calico Entertainment and MBC. One season was produced, with 26 episodes.

== Synopsis ==
Twinkle, the Dream Being, is a little, yellow wish-granting genie who turns the wishes of the inhabitants of the Land of Possibility into reality. Miss Diva Weed tries to stop him and enslave the population of the Land of Possibility.

Twinkle is accompanied by his friends, Nova and Wishball, as he shows the people that with a little bit of magic, anything is possible. Many of the problems are usually caused by Diva Weed and her ridiculous minions, the Hotshots, as Twinkle in most circumstances tries to help them in any way he can while getting them to stick up and believe in themselves.

This show was the last show created by Calico Creations airing in the US from 1992 to 1993.

== Characters ==
- Twinkle (voiced by Tress MacNeille): The title character, an intergalactic genie.
- Nova (voiced by Russi Taylor): A small, blue star creature that lives on Twinkle's head. She acts as his pilot ship.
- Wishball (voiced by Pat Fraley): A small, blue ball creature who works alongside Nova. He helps Twinkle fly around.
- Miss Diva Weed (voiced by Tress MacNeille): The main villainess of the show. A perverse and wicked witch who feeds off the despair of the people. She does everything to stop Twinkle and his plans.
- Won (voiced by Pat Fraley): One of Diva Weeds' Hotshot minions. He's usually serious about trying to get rid of Twinkle, but can befriend him just as easily.
- Chu (voiced by Cam Clarke): Diva Weeds' other Hotshot minion. He's usually accommodated with Won but Chu doesn't take his job all that serious in comparison. He's rather bumbling as pointed out by his peers.
- Urg (voiced by Pat Fraley): A giant rock monster with a large appetite. Most of the other characters are afraid of him because of his appearance, but is otherwise seen as friendly.

== Episode list ==
No.	Title	Written by	Original release date
1	"Park Pranksters"	Larry Bischof & William Brian Lowry	September 18, 1993
2	"School is Cool"	Larry Bischof & William Brian Lowry	September 25, 1993
3	"Shopping Mall Shenanigans"	Larry Bischof & William Brian Lowry	October 2, 1993
4	"Calamity Carnival"	Michael Maurer	October 9, 1993
5	"Home Sweet Home"	Larry Bischof & William Brian Lowry	October 16, 1993
6	"Way Out Campout"	Tony Marino	October 23, 1993
7	"Farm Festival Fun"	Richard Merwin	October 30, 1993
8	"Fun Park Fiasco"	Michael Maurer	November 6, 1993
9	"Mountain Madness"	Larry Bischof & William Brian Lowry	November 13, 1993
10	"One Wish, Two Wish"	Tony Marino	November 20, 1993
11	"Dream Being Birthday"	Richard Merwin	November 27, 1993
12	"All-Star Expo"	Larry Bischof & William Brian Lowry	December 4, 1993
13	"Once Upon an Urg"	Tony Marino	December 11, 1993
14	"Castle Capers"	Unknown	December 18, 1993
15	"Cosmic Ecology"	Tony Marino	January 15, 1994
16	"Pollution Solution"	Larry Bischof & William Brian Lowry	January 22, 1994
17	"Aquatic Adventures"	Larry Bischof & William Brian Lowry	January 29, 1994
18	"The Menace Apprentice"	Unknown	February 5, 1994
19	"Book Bash"	Larry Bischof & William Brian Lowry	February 12, 1994
20	"Culture Shock"	Unknown	February 19, 1994
21	"Better Together"	Larry Bischof & William Brian Lowry	February 26, 1994
22	"Energy Escapades"	Tony Marino	March 5, 1994
23	"Whale Wishing"	Unknown	March 12, 1994
24	"Pets Are Pals"	Larry Bischof & William Brian Lowry	March 19, 1994
25	"Be Safe, Not Sorry"	Unknown	March 26, 1994
26	"Rainforest Romp"	Unknown	April 2, 1994

== Broadcast UK history ==
- CITV (1994–1997)
- The Children's Channel (1994)
