= Vytor: The Starfire Champion =

- Written by: Marc Handler
- Directed by: Tom Burton
- Voices of: Allison Argo; Peter Cullen; Pat Fraley; Liz Georges; Michael Horton; Neil Ross
- Theme music composer: Bruce Broughton
- Composer: James Horner
- Country of origin: United States
- Original language: English
- No. of seasons: 1
- No. of episodes: 4

Production
- Producer: Tom Burton
- Running time: 22.5 min. per episode; 90 min. in total
- Production company: World Events Productions

Original release
- Release: August 15 – September 24, 1989

Vytor: The Starfire Champion (/ˈvaɪtɔːr/) is a 1989 American animated television miniseries produced by World Events Productions. The show aired four episodes.

== Plot ==
Vytor is armed with the magic shield. Along with the beautiful Skyla and his other friends, the hero battles Myzor Sarcophogus for the Starfire Ring and tries to recover the Saturn Orb.

== Cast ==
- Allison Argo as Baboose
- Peter Cullen as Myzor / Chief Eldor
- Pat Fraley as Windchaser / Air Mutoid Warrior / Land Mutoid Warrior
- Liz Georges as Skyla / Lyria
- Michael Horton as Vytor
- Neil Ross as Targil

== Production ==
Due to the amount of money used to make the episodes, which were a combination of computer graphics and normal cel animation, and since Vytor did not have a toy deal, only a few episodes were made. The series was only seen in a few select markets.

== Episode list ==
1. The Starfire Legacy: written by Doug Lefler
2. Aerion: written by Doug Lefler
3. The Spirit Tree: written by Ben Masselink and Michael Dale Brown
4. Wilderland: written by Marc Handler

== DVD ==
World Events Productions released all the episodes in a 2 disc DVD in 2006 with the individual episodes and a version of them edited together into a feature.
