= Denver, the Last Dinosaur =

- Genre: Comedy
- Created by: Peter Keefe
- Written by: Marc Handler
- Directed by: Tom Burton
- Voices of: Pat Fraley; Adam Carl; Cam Clarke; Kath Soucie; Rob Paulsen; Brian Cummings
- Composer: Dale Schacker
- Countries of origin: United States; France
- Original language: English
- No. of seasons: 2
- No. of episodes: 50

Production
- Executive producers: Peter Keefe; Ed Ascheman
- Producers: Tom Burton; Seok-ki
- Running time: 30 minutes
- Production companies: World Events Productions; Calico Entertainment; Groupe IDDH; Centre National Cinématographie; La Ville D'Angoulême

Original release
- Network: Syndication; FR3
- Release: March 31, 1988 – April 14, 1990

Denver, the Last Dinosaur is an American-French animated series produced by World Events Productions and Groupe IDDH. It was nationally syndicated throughout the United States in 1988 with reruns airing until 1990. In the show, a dinosaur hatches from a petrified egg in the modern era, and is befriended by a group of teenagers. Episodes often focused on issues of conservation, ecology, and greed.

The show ran for two seasons, as the dinosaur boom that had followed the film The Land Before Time (1988) waned until Jurassic Park (1993), causing viewership to drop. The series received a recommendation from the National Education Association.

A CG-animated reboot, which originally went under the name Denver and Cliff, premiered on M6 on August 27, 2018. The new series was produced by Zagtoon.

== Plot ==
The show revolves around Denver, the eponymous last dinosaur, who was released from his egg by a group of California teens: Jeremy, Mario, Shades, and Wally. The kids taught Denver the finer points of skateboarding and other pastimes while protecting him from rock concert promoter Morton Fizzback who wanted to use the dinosaur to make money.

The series begins when Jeremy, while preparing for his Natural History test, and his friends visit the La Brea Tar Pits – a place in Los Angeles which contains a large collection of extinct animal and plant fossils – and go to the Museum there. At the museum, the friends encounter a gang of bullies led by Nick. The friends escape the bullies by hiding behind a fence near the tar pits. Behind the fence they find a pit that contains a large prehistoric egg. As the friends are playing with the egg, it suddenly cracks and a green friendly dinosaur emerges who understands English. The kids name him Denver after they spot an advertisement for the city of Denver on a passing bus.

The teens decide to keep Denver and to keep his existence a secret. Denver is first hidden in a pool house at Wally's home. After Wally's sister Heather discovers Denver, they move Denver to the old school gym with help from Casey. After a while, Denver gets kidnapped by the manager Morton Fizzback, who puts Denver on a stage in front of an audience to become rich.

When the teens confront Morton about his abduction, he becomes paranoid that someone might find out that Denver is a real dinosaur. At the end, Denver is sold to a scientist named Dr. Funt, who wants to examine and experiment on him, and use him to become famous. Eventually, Denver gets to return to the gang and rescue them from Nick and his thugs.

In addition to his natural skills and abilities, Denver can also, with the help of a piece from the shell of his egg, take the gang with him back to the time whence he came.

== Characters ==
=== Main characters ===
- Denver is the main protagonist of the show and a close friend of the gang. He is a green Corythosaurus-like dinosaur of an unknown species, the last of his kind, who has proven to be a good and loyal friend. Denver first met Wally, Shades, Jeremy, and Mario when he hatched from his egg when the boys hid behind a fence in the tar pit from Nick and his friends. He surprisingly understands English. Denver got his name when the boys spotted an advertisement for the city of Denver on the side of a bus. He is a rock 'n roll music fan and likes to play electric guitar, ride skateboard and eat potato chips. Voiced by Pat Fraley.
- Wally Adams – Boy who takes Denver in, Denver's closest friend. He cares for various animals – including Rocky (his pup), three cats, Ears (a rabbit), and a parrot. Voiced by Adam Carl.
- Heather Adams – Wally's older, and sometimes annoying, sister. She has blonde hair in a ponytail. Voiced by Kath Soucie.
- Jeremy Anderson – the most intelligent and mature guy among the gang. He acts cerebral and possesses extensive knowledge about a wide variety of subjects, including the origin and habits of dinosaurs. Voiced by Adam Carl.
- Mario – A young teen with an enormous ego. Voiced by Cam Clarke.
- Shades – A cool teen who always wears sunglasses (where his name is derived from). He is of Hispanic descent. Voiced by Cam Clarke.
- Casey – Youngest of the gang, she is a mechanic and often helps the other members with the technical problems. She has a crush on Mario, most obvious in the first season, but he does not seem to share her feelings. Voiced by Kath Soucie.

=== Minor characters ===
- Rocky – Wally's pup.
- Chet – Heather's boyfriend, voiced by Rob Paulsen.
- Freddy Facknitts – A teenage genius who is also a fan of comic books, and has a strong, though somewhat comical, sense of justice. He was originally hired by Morton Fizzback to conduct an experiment on Denver's tar egg shell, but later helps out Denver and the gang, and provides technical support.

=== Villains ===
- Morton Fizzback – Drawn and voiced as an obvious characterization of actor Rodney Dangerfield, Fizzback is an arrogant, treacherous and greedy rock concert promoter voiced by Brian Cummings.
- Doctor Bartholomew Funt – Evil scientist, sometimes works with Morton, voiced by Brian Cummings.
- Nick – Leader of three other bullies, Curt, Scott, and Rod, who cause trouble for the boys, voiced by Rob Paulsen.
- Bertha Bird - A treasure hunter who sometimes crosses paths with Morton Fizzback, voiced by Tress MacNeille.

== Episodes ==
=== Season 1 (1988) ===
No. overall	No. in season	Title	Written by	Original release date
1	1	"Meet Denver"	Doug Lefler and Lynn Lefler	March 31, 1988
Hour-long pilot episode. A group of children, Wally, Jeremy, Shades, and Mario, visit the La Brea Tar Pits and discover an egg which hatches to reveal a friendly dinosaur, which they name 'Denver'. However, the gang must protect Denver from the ambitious Dr. Funt, and the evil rock concert marketer, Morton Fizzback, who aspires to use Denver to make a profit.
2	2	"In the Chips"	Doug Lefle and Lynn Lefler	September 10, 1988
Denver follows Jeremy to his job at the store, where he hides in the storeroom and eats chips.
3	3	"Videoohhh!"	Marc Handler and Larry Bischof	September 17, 1988
Wally borrows his sister Heather's camera, so that he and his friends can make a video starring themselves.
4	4	"The Monster of Lost Lake"	Doug Lefler and Lynn Lefler	September 24, 1988
While out camping at a mountain lake with the boys, Denver is mistaken for a terrible monster.
5	5	"Denver Makes the Grade"	Larry Bischof and Marc Handler	October 1, 1988
The boys decide to do a science project on dinosaurs for the school science fair.
6	6	"Big Top Denver"	Doug Lefler and Lynn Lefler	October 8, 1988
Denver and the gang help Kip and his father save the circus by performing their specialty acts with the other circus performers.
7	7	"The Misunderstanding"	Larry Bischof	October 15, 1988
Wally and Heather panic when they hear that their parents are planning to move out of town.
8	8	"Lions, Tigers, and Dinos!"	Doug Lefler and Lynn Lefler	October 22, 1988
Wally takes a job at the zoo, but on his first day, things take a turn for the worse as Denver is kidnapped by the self-serving Dr. Funt as part of his new high-tech exhibit.
9	9	"Change of Heart"	Larry Bischof	October 29, 1988
Denver rescues the gang's arch-rival Scott, causing him to soften up and abandon his plans to expose Denver to the media, subsequently causing him to gain publicity and votes for the upcoming student election.
10	10	"Broncosaurus"	Doug Lefler and Lynn Lefler	November 5, 1988
While they are visiting Jeremy's Uncle Eli on his ranch, the gang and Denver attend a local rodeo.
11	11	"Denver, Dino-Star!"	Larry Bischof and William Bryan Lowry	November 12, 1988
Casey's movie star cousin, Lana Lake, arrives in town and invites Casey, the boys and Denver to attend the filming of her latest sci-fi movie, 'Leapin' Lizards on the Loose'.
12	12	"Dinoland"	Doug Lefler and Lynn Lefler	November 19, 1988
Heather's new job makes for an exciting day of chases and thrills as Denver is mistaken for an employee of the park who is out to spy for a rival amusement park. Denver saves the day as he rescues five kids stuck on top of a roller coaster.

=== Season 2 (1989–1990) ===
No. overall	No. in season	Title	Written by	Original release date
13	1	"Winning"	Pamela Hickey and Dennys McCoy	September 25, 1989
Denver and Jeremy enter a game show, only to find out that they are competing against Dr. Funt and Morton Fizzback.
14	2	"Enter the Dino"	Doug Lefler and Lynn Lefler	September 26, 1989
Shades develops a recent interest in karate, as well as in Nikko, the daughter of his instructor.
15	3	"Radio Denver"	Bruce Morris	September 27, 1989
Wally's part-time job at the radio station, KAY-HIP, and the competition of the station with the rival radio station, KAY-LOUD, causes Denver to rise to fame as a radio star.
16	4	"The Phantom of the Movie Theater"	Doug Lefler and Lynn Lefler	September 28, 1989
When Heather and Wally's parents inform the two that they are expecting guests from out-of-town, they must hide Denver in the local movie theater, which is believed to be haunted.
17	5	"Missing Links"	Pamela Hickey and Dennys McCoy	September 29, 1989
A boy genius, Freddy Facknitts, invents a time machine that sends Denver and Morton Fizzback into the past and into the middle of a crazy caveman competition called Mammothball.
18	6	"Dog Gone Denver!"	Doug Lefler and Lynn Lefler	October 7, 1989
When the boys enter Wally's dog, Rocky, in a dog relay race, they must also disguise Denver as a dog so that Rocky will perform better.
19	7	"Party Time"	Pamela Hickey and Dennys McCoy	October 14, 1989
Denver and Mario take jobs as children's entertainers, only to face to wrath the wrath of Douggie, the Dancing Clown, who attempts to sabotage the duo's entertaining efforts.
20	8	"Aunt Shadie's Ghost Town"	Bruce Morris	October 16, 1989
While visiting Aunt Shadie's (Shades' aunt) house, the gang go on a wild minecart adventure in an attempt to retrieve the deed to the town from some thieves who stole it.
21	9	"Moviestarus"	Marc Handler	October 17, 1989
While on a tour of Big Movie Studio, Denver falls in love with an animatronic dinofem.
22	10	"Denver at Sea"	Doug Lefler and Lynn Lefler	October 18, 1989
When disreputable treasure hunters kidnap a dolphin from a local marine research facility and use him to locate sunken treasure, Denver dives in to save the dolphin.
23	11	"Ski Denver"	Doug Lefler and Lynn Lefler	October 19, 1989
Heather and the boys take Denver to a mountain ski resort.
24	12	"Beach Blanket Dino"	Bruce Morris	October 20, 1989
The secluded beach where Mario surfs and the kids play is taken over by Rad Tad and his group of Surf Dudes.
25	13	"History Repeats Itself"	Doug Lefler and Lynn Lefler	October 28, 1989
Wally is in a predicament with Johnny Price, a boy who constantly plays practical jokes on him, Denver uses his magic eggshell to bring Wally back to a time where he was torment by the Pteranodon, causing Wally to find a solution to his predicament and befriending Johnny Price.
26	14	"Battle of the Bands"	Pamela Hickey and Dennys McCoy	November 4, 1989
Denver and the group deck out in wild caveman attire and form a rock group, B.C Rock, to compete in the city wide talent contest, as does Freddy Facknitts (by forming a group of robots called Roborock). However, Dr. Funt and Morton Fizzback kidnap the robot band and Denver and the gang must rescue them.
27	15	"The Comic Book Caper"	Pamela Hickey and Dennys McCoy	November 6, 1989
Denver, the boys, and Freddy Facknitts attend a comic book convention dressed as their favorite comic book characters.
28	16	"Carnival!"	Doug Lefler and Lynn Lefler	November 7, 1989
Denver practices his magic act for the Charity Carnival when he and the gang get more than they bargain for. When Denver wins a rare historical artifact that was mistakenly donated for the raffle, he finds himself on the run from the shady Bird family who are out to get their priceless piece back.
29	17	"Pen Pal"	Pamela Hickey and Dennys McCoy	November 8, 1989
Wally's attractive female pen pal from Sweden, Inga Svinga, comes for a visit.
30	18	"The Chinatown Caper"	Doug Lefler and Lynn Lefler	November 9, 1989
Denver, dressed in a Chinese lion robe and headdress, leads a mad chase for dognappers in Chinatown during the Chinese New Year Parade.
31	19	"Denver and the Cornstalk"	Doug Lefler and Lynn Lefler	November 10, 1989
In an embellished version of 'Jack And the Beanstalk', Denver buys some magic corn kernels off Morton Fizzback, which are thrown into the ground and grow into a giant cornstalk, which Denver climbs to find the giantess of the castle (Bertha Bird).
32	20	"Tee Time for Denver"	Pamela Hickey and Dennys McCoy	November 18, 1989
Denver's mistaken identity at a golf tournament sets Fizzback and Funt off on a high-tech cheating spree, while the golf course Groundskeeper tries to capture what he believes to be the Loch Ness Monster.
33	21	"Birthday Party from Outer Space"	Pamela Hickey and Dennys McCoy	November 25, 1989
The kids need Denver out of the way while they prepare a surprise birthday party for their dino-pal. But dino-sitter Freddy Facknitts gets them both into trouble when his "space ship" puts Dr. Funt, who thinks he is an alien from outer space, on their tail.
34	22	"Food Wars"	Pamela Hickey and Dennys McCoy	December 2, 1989
Mario and Shades get jobs working for competing fast food stores, which jeopardizes their friendship, and eventually sparks a rivalry between them.
35	23	"Denver, the Lost Dinosaur"	Unknown	December 9, 1989
When Denver, Casey and Freddy Facknitts accidentally become airborne in the latter's created aircraft, rumours of UFO sightings start to spread through the town.
36	24	"Jogging Denver" "Dino-cise"	Unknown	December 16, 1989
Denver is put through his paces, participating in an exercise program with the kids while trying to hide a mischievous baby gorilla.
37	25	"Denver, the Last Dragon"	Unknown	December 30, 1989
While at a medieval fair, Denver and the gang wind up in a wacky jousting tournament, pitted against Morton Fizzback's Black Night.
38	26	"High Flying Denver"	Unknown	January 20, 1990
Morton Fizzback and Bertha Bird collaborate to seek Denver after he escapes from them in a hot-air balloon.
39	27	"Denver at the Digs"	Unknown	January 27, 1990
Denver and the gang help Jeremy's great-aunt Adelaide save a precious fossil from a land developer, who is aided by Dr. Funt.
40	28	"Chef Denver"	Unknown	February 3, 1990
Denver's new-found passion for gourmet cooking is challenged when he is asked to prepare the food for a party for Jeremy's new girlfriend.
41	29	"Fizzback's Follies"	Unknown	February 10, 1990
The gang play a hockey competition against Morton Fizzback's team of professional misfits, and the winner earns possession of Denver.
42	30	"Dinos Are My Life"	Unknown	February 17, 1990
Casey befriends Louden, a shy, withdrawn, new kid, who has a passion for dinosaurs.
43	31	"Bayou Blues"	Unknown	February 24, 1990
While on a mapping expedition with Jeremy's great-aunt Adelaide, Denver and the gang run into two bizarre alligator poachers, and a love-sick alligator, who mistakes Denver for one of his own kind.
44	32	"Canatta"	Unknown	March 3, 1990
The boys receive an invitation from their friend Senior Santos to spend a relaxing week at a resort located on the mythical island of Canatta.
45	33	"Pluto Needs People"	Unknown	March 10, 1990
Denver fantasizes about battling evil aliens from Pluto in a 1950s style sci-fi adventure.
46	34	"Arabian Adventure"	Unknown	March 17, 1990
Mario reads a story he wrote to Denver and the gang, which comes to life with the aid of their imaginations, leading them on an adventure involving a magic cavern filled with treasure, a flying carpet, and a genie in a lamp.
47	35	"Venice Beach Blast"	Unknown	March 24, 1990
Denver and the gang land themselves in trouble when they try to find a place to skateboard at California's Venice Beach.
48	36	"Big News Denver"	Unknown	March 31, 1989
Denver is discovered by a newspaper reporter, who aspires to make Denver the topic of his newest front-page headline.
49	37	"Viva Denver!"	Unknown	April 7, 1990
When Shades' grandfather accidentally misdirects this year's annual Cinco de Mayo parade, Denver and the gang must save the festival.
50	38	"There's No Business Like Snow Business"	Unknown	April 14, 1990
Dr. Funt and Morton Fizzback aspire to create a major snowstorm in Los Angeles.

== Reception ==
In 2014, the io9 website listed Denver, the Last Dinosaur as one of twelve 1980s cartoons that did not deserve remembrance. Writer Rob Bricken also criticised the title character as "a dinosaur wearing sunglasses who skateboards and plays an electric guitar. It’s The Simpsons' Poochie before Poochie ever existed."

Reviewer Michael P. Dougherty II of Fulvue Drive-in was more positive about the show. Reviewing the DVD release of Denver, the Last Dinosaur, Dougherty wrote "the series is surprisingly fun and entertaining; often focusing on friendship, ecology, conservationism while making it relatable to children."

== Merchandise and home media releases ==
Knott's Berry Farm offered a Denver promotional tie-in with its new Kingdom of the Dinosaurs attraction (which would later take its last rider in 2004), as did Ralston Cereals with its new brand Dinersaurs (which sold poorly and was discontinued by the end of 1988).

Various episodes of the series were released on VHS by Fries Home Video.

World Events Productions released two DVD volumes through their Voltron.com website. The first volume included the hour-long pilot and the following eight episodes. The second volume includes 10 episodes. World Events Productions had the complete series on YouTube; it was removed on December 31, 2010, because of synchronizing problems, but as of February 2012, all but three episodes had been restored. On February 11, 2011, World Events Productions released the complete series on Hulu.

On September 16, 2014, VCI Entertainment released Denver, The Last Dinosaur – The Complete Series on DVD in Region 1 for the very first time.

The series is now owned by MarVista Entertainment.

== 2018 reboot ==
In October 2015, Zagtoon confirmed it was in the pre-production phase on a CG-animated reboot of the series. Produced with Method Animation, the new show premiered on M6 in France on August 27, 2018. Distributor PGS Entertainment sold the series to over 30 markets worldwide. In North America, Yoopa began airing it in Canada starting June 2, 2019, with TiVi5 Monde in the United States following in April 2020. In Belgium, the series debuted on La Trois on September 4, 2019.

An English dubbed version began airing in New Zealand on TVNZ in March 2019. In South Africa, it debuted on eToonz on January 15, 2020. In the United States, it premiered on Primo TV on December 7, 2020.

Characters

- Denver a dinosaur and the main protagonist.
- Cliff Scott a human boy and Denver's best friend.
- Charlotte Cliff's friend and vlogger.
- Super Dan Cliff's friend whom is very imaginative.
