= Mr. Bogus =

- Created by: Peter Keefe
- Directed by: Tom Burton
- Voices of: Cam Clarke; Brian Cummings; Jim Cummings; Jeannie Elias; Pat Fraley; Tress MacNeille; Neil Ross; Russi Taylor
- Composer: Dale Schacker
- Country of origin: United States
- Original language: English
- No. of seasons: 3
- No. of episodes: 43

Production
- Executive producer: Peter Keefe
- Producers: Claudia Burton; Tom Burton
- Running time: 30 minutes
- Production companies: Y.C. Aligator Film; Calico Entertainment; Zodiac Entertainment

Original release
- Network: Syndication
- Release: September 28, 1991 – November 22, 1993

Mr. Bogus is an American animated television series created by Peter Keefe, directed and produced by Tom Burton with Claudia Burton of Zodiac Entertainment, which aired in syndication from September 28, 1991 to November 22, 1993. The show also ran in 1998 on Fox Family Channel. It is loosely based on the French / Belgian clay animation series of shorts simply titled, Bogus. Each episode is separated into two distinct parts, one using mostly traditional cel animation and another using what the show is based on, which are 42 localized versions of the 300 original clay animation shorts (either 8 claymation shorts per episode, 336 in total). Characters often walked around on a kitchen counter having various adventures with common household items.

The show has also aired on Channel 4 and The Children's Channel in the UK, on Welsh language channel S4C as "Mr. Bogel" in Wales, as well as on Telefutura program block, Toonturama as "El Señor Bogus" in United States with Spanish-dubbed, on TV Globo in Brazil, on TVN in Chile, ANT1 in Greece, on Arutz HaYeladim in Israel as "Mr. Bluffer", on Max in Australia, on Fun Channel in the Middle East, on M-Net in South Africa, on Bahrain 55 in Bahrain, on TV2 in New Zealand, on ABS-CBN in The Philippines, on Channel 5 in Singapore, on Channel 2 in Jordan, on Dubai 33 in the UAE, on Canal J in France, on Tele 3 and TVP3 in Poland, on kabel eins in Germany, on MBC C&I in South Korea, on TV3 in Sweden, on PTV4 in Finland, on Saudi 2 in Saudi Arabia, on TV3 in Malaysia and on TV6 in Russia.

== Summary ==
=== Cel-animated version ===
In the cel-animated version, Mr. Bogus is a yellow gremlin-like creature living in the walls of the suburban home of Tommy Anybody, alternately creating problems and/or accidentally solving them. Sometimes Bogus adventures to his own world, Bogusland, a distorted alternate dimension of curved and warped perspective and bizarre plots. He often encountered the feared dust bunnies known on the show as Dirt Dudes.

=== Clay animated version ===
The clay-animated version is a series of shorts that are localized versions of several episodes of the 1987 French / Belgian series of shorts simply titled Bogus, and served as lead-ins to commercial breaks. They were originally produced by Antenne 2, Y.C. Aligator Film and Chin Chin Production, and were created by Michel Durieux and Ghislain Honoré. They were first aired on October 30, 1987, and reran from October 2, 1988 to February 1990. There were 300 episodes created, but only 42 were localized and used in the 42 episodes of the cel-animated version.

In the original 1987 plot, the male house owner was awakened by his alarm clock, drank coffee, took his keys, and left for work. But during his absence, the house wasn't alone. Bogus, a funny little yellow character, then emerged from his hiding place and had short and fun adventures with surrounding objects. As Bogus clumsily discovered the world around him in different rooms of the house (such as the bathroom and the attic), he always provoked laughter from viewers.

In the 1991 localized version, the original voice-acting and background music were changed to Cam Clarke's voice-acting and the instrumental version of the cel-animated version's opening theme respectively.

== Episodes ==
Season 1 (1991)

- "Meet Mr. Bogus" (September 28, 1991)
- "Class Clown Bogus" (October 5, 1991)
- "A Day at the Office" (October 12, 1991)
- "Et Tu, Brattus?" (October 19, 1991)
- "Shop Around the Clock" (October 26, 1991)
- "Beach Blanket Bogus" (November 2, 1991)
- "Bogus in Wilderland" (November 9, 1991)
- "No Snooze is Good News" (November 16, 1991)
- "Hipster Tripster" (November 23, 1991)
- "Museum Madness" (December 7, 1991)
- "Lights, Camera, Bogus" (December 14, 1991)
- "Bogus in Bogus Land" (December 21, 1991)
- "Good Sport Bogus" (December 28, 1991)

Season 2 (1992)

- "Computer Intruder" (September 27, 1992)
- "Babysitting Bogus" (October 4, 1992)
- "Bogunda, Bogetta & Bogus" (October 11, 1992)
- "Bookstore Bogus" (October 18, 1992)
- "Bad Luck Bogus" (October 25, 1992)
- "Totally Bogus Video" (November 1, 1992)
- "Bogus Private Eye" (November 8, 1992)
- "Bogus to the Rescue" (November 15, 1992)
- "Mr. Bogus' Sci-Fi Fest" (November 22, 1992)
- "Terror Tot in Bogusland" (November 29, 1992)
- "Roam Away from Home" (December 6, 1992)
- "Bugboy Bogus" (December 13, 1992)
- "Springtime for Bogus" (December 20, 1992)

Season 3 (1993)

- "Nightmare on Bogus Street" (October 27, 1993)
- "B-TV" (October 28, 1993)
- "Waterboy Bogus" (November 3, 1993)
- "Kung Fu Camp Out" (November 4, 1993)
- "Battle Action Bogus" (November 5, 1993)
- "Secret Agent Bogus" (November 8, 1993)
- "Super Bogus Flies Again" (November 9, 1993)
- "Is There a Bogus in the House?" (November 10, 1993)
- "The Bogus Invasion" (November 11, 1993)
- "Fun Park Follies" (November 14, 1993)
- "Buff-Tuff Bogie" (November 15, 1993)
- "Once Upon a Bogus Time" (November 16, 1993)
- "Brainy Bogus" (November 17, 1993)
- "Mega Star Madness" (November 18, 1993)
- "Totally Bogus Daydream" (November 21, 1993)
- "Baseball Bogie" (November 22, 1993)
- "Hospital Play" (November 29, 1993)

== Alternative titles ==
- مستر بوغِس (Mistar Boghes) (Arabic Title)
- Majstor Fantaz (Croatian Title)
- Monsieur Bogus (French Title)
- Jetzt kommt Bogus! (German Title)
- Μίστερ Μπόγκους (Greek Title)
- מר בלופר (Mar Blopher) (Hebrew Title)
- 보거스는 내 친구 (Bogeoseuneun nae chingu) (Korean Title)
- Pan Boguś (Polish Title)
- Senhor Bogus (Portuguese Title)
- Мистер Богус (Mister Bogus) (Russian Title)
- Gospodin Mufljuz (Serbian Title)
- Herr Humbug (Norwegian Title)

== Cast ==
- Voice Characterization Actors: Cam Clarke as Mr. Bogus, Tress MacNeille, Jeannie Elias, Pat Fraley, Neil Ross, Jim Cummings, Brian Cummings, Russi Taylor
