= Pat Fraley =

American voice actor and voice-over teacher

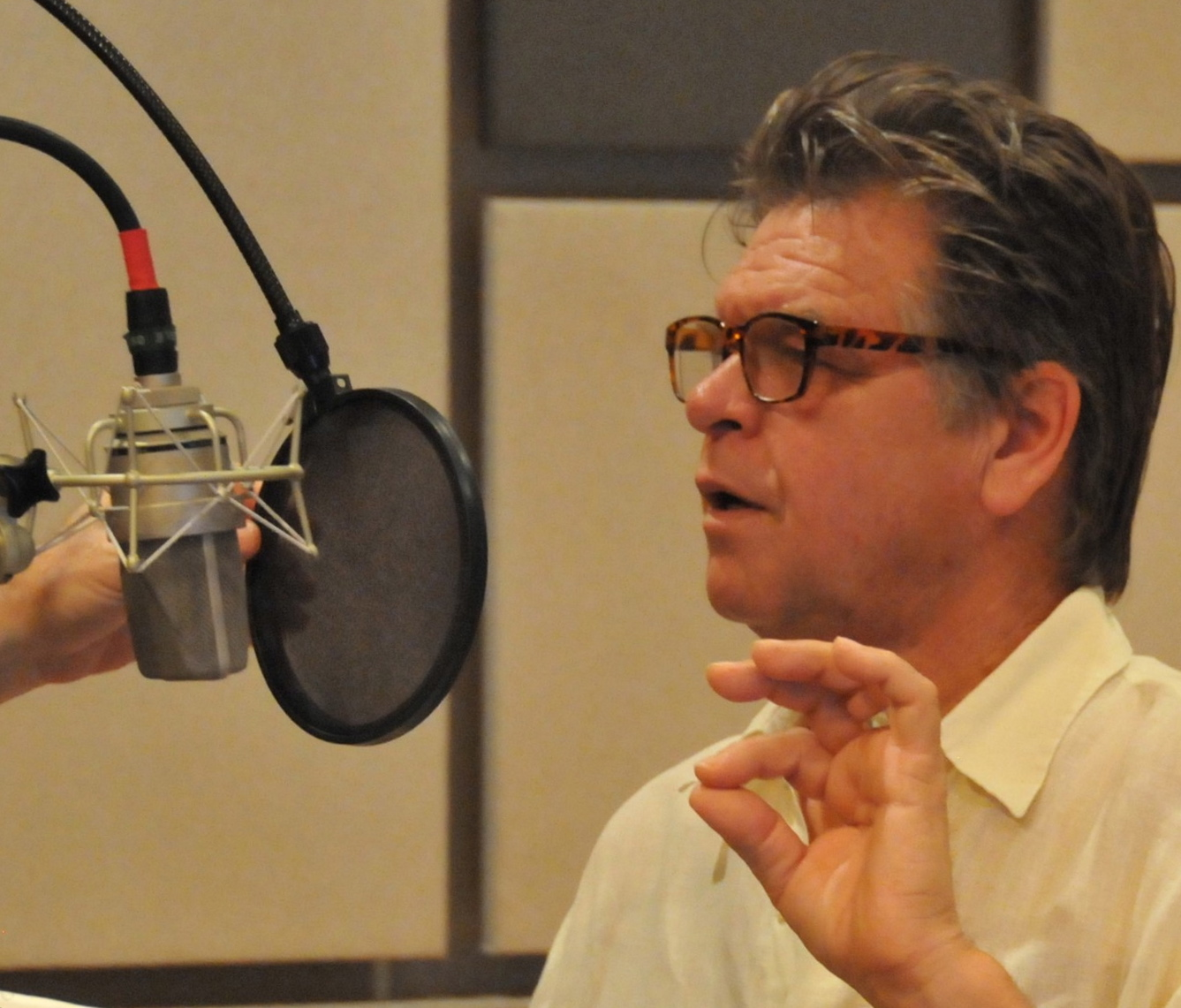
- Fraley in 2011
- Born: Seattle, Washington, U.S.
- Other name: Patrick Fraley
- Occupations: Voice actor, voice-over teacher
- Years active: 1979–present
- Agent(s): Cunningham, Escott, Slevin and Doherty
- Spouse: Renee Zimmerman (m. 1979)
- Children: 4
- Family: Cam Clarke (cousin); Buddy Cole (uncle); Tina Cole (cousin)
- Website: patfraley.com

Pat Fraley is an American voice actor and voice-over teacher, known as the voice of Krang, Casey Jones, Baxter Stockman and numerous other characters in the 1987 Teenage Mutant Ninja Turtles animated television series and voiced Falcon in the 2003 Stuart Little animated television series. Fraley is also a member of Voice and Speech Trainers of America.

== Career ==
Fraley voiced his first role as Scrappy Doo in Hanna-Barbera's Scooby Goes Hollywood in 1979.

In 1985, he voiced Ace on G.I. Joe: A Real American Hero and Hillbilly Jim on Hulk Hogan's Rock 'n' Wrestling. He played Slick the Turtle on ABC's The Littles. He later did the voices of Coach Frogface and Sludge on Galaxy High School.

In the 1980s and 1990s he appeared in guest roles on animated series such as Denver, the Last Dinosaur, Garfield and Friends, The Twisted Tales of Felix the Cat, Little Clowns of Happytown, The New Yogi Bear Show, Filmation's Ghostbusters, Goof Troop, Bonkers, Gargoyles, Yo Yogi!, Batman: The Animated Series, Bobby's World, The Tick, James Bond Jr., The Mask: The Animated Series, The Little Mermaid, and The Angry Beavers.

Pat voiced the title character in BraveStarr, Fireball in Saber Rider and the Star Sheriffs, Cousin Itt in The Addams Family, Max Ray in Ruby Spears' The Centurions, Lurky, Buddy Blue, On-X and Evil Force in Rainbow Brite, young Scrooge McDuck and Sir Guy Standforth in DuckTales, Gwumpki in Quack Pack, Sniff in Space Cats and as Wildcat in TaleSpin. He also voiced Kyle the Cat on The Tom and Jerry Kids Show and lead character, Marshal Moo Montana in Wild West C.O.W.-Boys of Moo Mesa as well as Tuffy Smurf in The Smurfs.

In 2004, Fraley appeared as a guest star on Cartoon Network's The Grim Adventures Of Billy And Mandy, Fox’s King of the Hill, and Nickelodeon's My Life as a Teenage Robot, The Fairly OddParents, and ChalkZone. The following year, he had a minor role in Disney's animated film The Wild and also voiced Fred's uncle Karl on an episode of What's New, Scooby-Doo?. He also had a role on camera as Mr. Harris in 'Til Death and did voices in the two live-action films The High Crusade and The Fisher King.

In 2007, Fraley made his live-action voice role debut in the post-apocalyptic science fiction horror film I Am Legend where he voiced the President of the United States.

Fraley substituted for Tim Allen in the early years as the voice of Buzz Lightyear in various video and computer games, merchandise, attractions, and the Disney On Ice Disneyland Adventure.

He has voiced roles in Toy Story 2, Monsters, Inc., Chicken Little, Tangled, and Happy Feet Two and performed ADR work for films such as The Muppets and Lincoln.

== Personal life ==
Fraley has been married to his wife Renee Zimmerman since 1979; together they have four children.

He grew up in the Mormon faith but became a born-again Christian later in life. He lives in Hollywood, California. He is good friends with fellow actor Brad Garrett and was a close friend to actor Ed Asner.

He got his MFA degree in Acting from Cornell University in 1973.

== Filmography ==
=== Film ===
Animation

Year	Title	Role	Notes
1979	Scooby Goes Hollywood	Brother, Security Guard, Announcer	Made-For-TV film
1985	Rainbow Brite and the Star Stealer	Lurky, On-X, Buddy Blue, Dog, Guard, Spectran, Slurthie, Glitterbot	
1985	The GLO Friends Save Christmas	GLO Worm	Made-For-TV film
1985	Bigfoot and the Muscle Machines	Additional voices	Direct-to-Video film
1986	The Adventures of the American Rabbit	Tini Meeny	
1987	Yogi's Great Escape	Reporter, Cowboy Kid #1, Swamp Fox Kid	Made-For-TV film
1988	BraveStarr: The Movie	Marshal BraveStarr, Thunderstick	
1988	The Good, the Bad, and Huckleberry Hound	Additional voices	Made-For-TV film
1988	Rockin' with Judy Jetson	Zilchy	Made-For-TV film
1989	X-Men: Pryde of the X-Men	Pyro	Made-For-TV film
1990	Robotix	Exeter Galaxon, Nomo	Direct-to-VHS film
1992	Defenders of Dynatron City	Jeff Headstrong	Made-For-TV film
1992	Porco Rosso	Bellini	English dub
1993	Bubsy	Arnold Armadillo, Virgil Reality	Made-For-TV film
1995	Gargoyles the Movie: The Heroes Awaken	Brendan	Made-For-TV film
1997	Princess Mononoke	Additional voices	English dub
1999	Toy Story 2	Toy Store Buzz Lightyears	
2001	Monsters, Inc.	Blobby, Ricky Plesuski	
2003	Charlotte's Web 2: Wilbur's Great Adventure	Donkey	
2003	Elysium	Oz, Gramps	Direct-to-DVD film
2004	Nine Dog Christmas	Santa, Number 2 Elf	Direct-to-DVD film
2005	Chicken Little	Additional voices	
2005	Here Comes Peter Cottontail: The Movie	Chipmunk, Dad Mouse, Hawk	Direct-to-DVD film
2006	The Ant Bully	Ant Council #1	
2006	The Wild	Penguins	
2006	Tales from Earthsea	Weapon Salesman, Advisor #2	English dub
2006	Casper's Scare School	The Narrator, Scare Center Hosts, Werewolf, Wolfie	
2007	Garfield Gets Real	Sid, Delivery Gnome	
2010	Tangled	Additional voices	
2011	Puss in Boots	ADR group	
2011	Happy Feet Two	Additional voices	
2014	The Boxtrolls	Fragile, Sweets	
2014	The Snow Queen 2	Rakhat	English dub

Live Action

Year	Title	Role	Notes	Director
1991	The Fisher King	Radio Show Call-In Guest	As Patrick Fraley; Voice	Terry Gilliam
2007	I Am Legend	President of the United States	As Patrick Fraley; Voice	Francis Lawrence

=== Television ===
Year	Title	Role	Notes
1979-1983	Scooby-Doo and Scrappy-Doo	Tiger Morris, Policeman	2 episodes
1979-1984	Super Friends	Sir James, Additional voices	10 episodes Across Super Friends and Super Friends: The Legendary Super Powers Show
1982	The Gary Coleman Show	Additional voices	2 episodes
1982-1983	The Incredible Hulk	Major Ned Talbot, Additional voices	13 episodes
1983	G.I. Joe: A Real American Hero	Ace, Barbecue, Wild Weasel	5 episodes
1983	Spider-Man and His Amazing Friends	Gamesman, Computer, Military Officer	Episode: "Education of a Superhero"
1983	The Dukes	Peppino, Additional voices	7 episodes
1984	Lucky Luke	Billy the Kid, Additional voices	Recurring role English dub
1984	Turbo Teen	Dr. Chase, Eddie	13 episodes
1984-1985	The Littles	Slick the Turtle, Rottinus Maximus	16 episodes
1984-1986	Rainbow Brite	Lurky, Buddy Blue, On-X, Evil Force, Brian's dog	13 episodes
1984-1989	The Smurfs	Tuffy Smurf	6 episodes
1985	Alvin and the Chipmunks	Additional voices	10 episodes
1985-1986	Paw Paws	Additional voices	21 episodes
1985-1986	Galtar and the Golden Lance	Additional voices	21 episodes
1985-1986	Hulk Hogan's Rock 'n' Wrestling	Hillbilly Jim	21 episodes
1985-1987	The Jetsons	Skyhawk Mike, additional voices	52 episodes
1986	The Glo Friends	Glo Worm	Main role
1986	Filmation's Ghostbusters	Jake Kong, Jr., Ghost Buggy, Scared Stiff, Additional voices	65 episodes
1986	Galaxy High School	Coach Frogface, Sludge	13 episodes
1986	Pound Puppies	Sherlock Bones, Mouseketter 1, Pupnik, Fleaco, Santa Claus, Yapper	6 episodes
1986	Lazer Tag Academy	Charlie Ferguson, Skugs	13 episodes
1986-1988	The Flintstone Kids	Additional voices	34 episodes
1987	DuckTales	Young Scrooge McDuck, Sir Guy Standforth	2 episodes
1987	Little Clowns of Happytown	Awful BeBad, Geek & Whiner	2 episodes
1987	Blondie and Dagwood	Daisy Bumstead	Main role
1987-1988	BraveStarr	Marshall Bravestarr, Thunderstick, Cactus Head, Additional voices	Main role 65 episodes
1987-1988	Saber Rider and the Star Sheriffs	Fireball	Main role 52 episodes
1987-1996	Teenage Mutant Ninja Turtles	Krang, Vernon Fenwick (season 1), Casey Jones, Baxter Stockman, Slash, Burne Thompson, Baby Shredder (1989 episode), Sergeant Granitor, Napoleon Bonafrog, Dirtbag, Raptor, Synapse, Additional voices	Main role 156 episodes
1988	The New Yogi Bear Show	Additional voices	4 episodes
1988-1989	Fantastic Max	Additional voices	4 episodes
1988-1989	Denver, the Last Dinosaur	Denver	Main role 50 episodes
1989	The Further Adventures of SuperTed	Spottyman	Main role United States dub 13 episodes
1989	Camp Candy	Additional voices	10 episodes
1990	Tiny Toon Adventures	Travel Agent, Pen Pal, French Spoon	2 episodes
1990	Midnight Patrol: Adventures in the Dream Zone	Jester Dog	As Patrick Fraley; 13 episodes
1990	The Wizard of Oz	Truckle	13 episodes
1990	Bill & Ted's Excellent Adventures	Additional voices	13 episodes
1990	Barnyard Commandos	Additional voices	
1990	New Kids on the Block	Additional voices	15 episodes
1990-1991	TaleSpin	Wildcat, Doctor, Policeman	Main role 31 episodes
1990-1991	Widget the World Watcher	Mega-Slank, Mr. Bass, Hubert Ratman	14 episodes
1990-1998	Bobby's World	Meeker	Recurring role 36 episodes
1990-1992	The Tom and Jerry Kids Show	Kyle the Cat	As Patrick Fraley; 4 episodes
1991	The Legend of Prince Valiant	Soldier	As Patrick Fraley; Episode: "The Dream"
1991	Darkwing Duck	Additional voices	6 episodes
1991	Where's Waldo?	Additional voices	13 episodes
1991	Space Cats	Sniff	13 episodes
1991	ProStars	Buster	13 episodes
1991-1992	Yo Yogi!	Mad Painter	Recurring role 18 episodes
1991-1992	James Bond Jr.	Additional voices	
1991-1992	Mr. Bogus	Dad, Molie	5 episodes
1992	Goof Troop	Wally, Mr. Huge	4 episodes
1992	The Little Mermaid	Villain #2	Episode: "Stormy"
1992-1993	Wild West C.O.W.-Boys of Moo Mesa	Marshall Moo Montana, Clucky	Main role 26 episodes
1992-1993	The Addams Family	Cousin Itt	Main role 21 episodes
1992-1994	Batman: The Animated Series	Bat-Mite, Jest	2 episodes
1993	Sonic the Hedgehog (SatAM)	Saxophone Robot	Episode: "Harmonic Sonic"
1993	Biker Mice from Mars	Additional voices	Episode: "The Pits"
1993	Twinkle, the Dream Being	Urg, Wishball	Episode: "Park Pranksters"
1993-1994	Bonkers	Bucky Buzzsaw, Ma's Henchman, Toon Microphone Boom	9 episodes
1993-1994	Problem Child	Additional voices	26 episodes
1994	Red Planet	Willis	Miniseries; 4 episodes
1994-1995	Gargoyles	Brendan, Jogger	3 episodes
1994-1996	The Tick	Additional voices	19 episodes
1995	The What-A-Cartoon! Show	The Mad Bomber	Episode: "Pfish & Chip in 'Short Phuse'"
1995-1996	The Twisted Tales of Felix the Cat	The Mad Doctor, Additional voices	8 episodes
1996	The Mask: The Animated Series	Additional voices	10 episodes
1996	Richie Rich	Dollar the Dog	Recurring role 6 episodes
1996	The Spooktacular New Adventures of Casper	Cleaner Ghost, Logical, Order	2 episodes
1996	Wing Commander Academy	Garahl nar Hhallas, Dr. Guthrig Andropolos, Kilrathi Captain, Additional voices	11 episodes
1996	Toy Story Treats	Buzz Lightyear	
1996-1999	Timon and Pumbaa	Wolverine, Jumbo Jumbo	2 episodes
1997	Extreme Ghostbusters	Additional voices	2 episodes
1997-1998	The New Adventures of Zorro	Don Alejandro	Main role 26 episodes
1997-2001	Men in Black: The Animated Series	Stadium Janitor, Bob the Twin, Worm Guys	46 episodes
1998	Cow and Chicken	Announcer #2, Cop	Episode: "The Bad News Plastic Surgeon/I.R. in Wrong Cartoon/The Exchange Student"
1998	Invasion America	Additional voices	5 episodes
1998-1999	The Secret Files of the Spy Dogs	Witchdoctor Clad, Additional voices	13 episodes
1999	The Brothers Flub	Additional voices	16 episodes
1999-2002	The New Woody Woodpecker Show	Announcer, Kid, Nash, Police Pig	4 episodes
2001	Time Squad	Kublai Khan	Episode: "Kublai Khan't/Lewis and Clark and Larry"
2002	Jason and the Heroes of Mount Olympus	Hercules	As Pat Farley; 8 episodes
2002-2003	Ozzy & Drix	Brain Advisor, Pnemoniac, Nerve Cell General, The Dark Horror	5 episodes
2002-2008	ChalkZone	Flatso, Jackie, Slippy, Genie, Big Toe Man, Mamma Bunny, Ken Spark	10 episodes
2003	Stuart Little	Falcon	Episode: "A Little Bit Country"
2004	King of the Hill	Customer	Episode: "DaleTech"
2004	The Fairly OddParents	Lance Thruster	Episode: "Crash Nebula"
2004	My Life as a Teenage Robot	Santa Claus, Captain, Skeeves	Episode: "A Robot For All Seasons"
2004-2006	The Grim Adventures of Billy & Mandy	Squirrel, Cop, Schlub #1, Jeeves, Lil Porkchop, Announcer, Wiggy Jiggy Jed, Dr. Fear, Clortho, Sock Boy	4 episodes
2005	What's New, Scooby-Doo?	Uncle Karl	Episode: "Fright House of a Lighthouse"
2005-2006	Crab Cove	Colonel Crab, Salty Seagull	Main role 13 episodes
2006	W.I.T.C.H.	Marco	English dub 2 episodes
2011	The Super Hero Squad Show	Beta Ray Bill	Episode: "The Ballad of Beta Ray Bill!"
2011	Secret Mountain Fort Awesome	Additional voices	3 episodes
2013	Level Up	Insect Slug	Episode: "War Hammer Time"
2014	The Legend of Korra	Gombo	Episode: "The Earth Queen"
2014	WWE Slam City	The Finisher	Uncredited; 3 episodes
2016-2017	Teenage Mutant Ninja Turtles	80s Krang	4 episodes
2017-2019	Hanazuki: Full of Treasures	Doughy Bunington	9 episodes

=== Video games ===
Year	Title	Role	Notes
1995	Toy Story	Buzz Lightyear, Nightmare Buzz	
1996	Animated Storybook: Toy Story	Buzz Lightyear, Rocky Gilbraltar	
1996	Toy Story: Activity Center	Buzz Lightyear, Rocky Gilbralter, Pizza Planet Alien Slime Dispensers	
1996	Just Me and My Dad		
1997	Carmen Sandiego Math Detective	Chase Devineaux	
1997	Herc's Adventures	Minotaur, Helldog, Soldier	
1998	A Bug's Life: The Video Game	Bouncer, Centipede, Firefly	
1998	Carmen Sandiego's ThinkQuick Challenge	Chase Devineaux	
1999	Toy Story 2: Buzz Lightyear to the Rescue	Toy Store Buzz Lightyear	
1999	Carmen Sandiego Word Detective	Chase Devineaux	
2000	Forgotten Realms: Icewind Dale	Additional voices	As Patrick Fraley
2000	Star Wars: Jar Jar's Journey Adventure Book	Jawa, Snout Alien, Spacesuit Alien	
2000	Escape from Monkey Island	George, Stan	
2000	Sacrifice	Additional voices	
2000	Toy Story 2: Activity Center	Buzz Lightyear, Woody's Round-up Announcer	
2001	Toy Story Racer	Rocky Gibraltar	
2001	Aladdin in Nasira's Revenge	Additional voices	
2001	Atlantis The Lost Empire: Search for the Journal	Journal Keepers, Additional voices	
2003	Evil Dead: A Fistful of Boomstick	Additional voices	
2003	Star Wars: Knights of the Old Republic	Dak Vesser, Gelrood, Republic Diplomat	
2003	Gladius	Additional voices	
2003	Disney's Extreme Skate Adventure	Buzz Lightyear	As Patrick Fraley
2003	The Haunted Mansion	Ghost	
2003	Star Wars Rogue Squadron III: Rebel Strike	Jabba Guard, Officer 1, Owen, Rebel Trooper, Commando, Commander 1	
2003	Terminator 3: Rise of the Machines	Additional voices	
2003	Armed and Dangerous	Captain 1, Indian Peasant, Q, Russian Captain	
2006	Gothic 3	Additional voices	
2008	Spore	Additional voices	
2008	Command & Conquer 3: Kane's Wrath	Additional voices	
2008	The Hardy Boys: The Hidden Theft	Thomas, Orin, TV Voice	
2008	Kung Fu Panda: Legendary Warriors	Tai Lung	Replacing Ian McShane
2009	Dragon Age: Origins	Beraht, Master Wade, Loilinar Ivo, Lord Bemot, Orzammar Royal Guard, Tapster's Patron, Bounty Hunter, Alienage Elf Man	
2009	Final Fantasy XIII	Cocoon Inhabitants	
2009	Yoga Wii	Yoga Instructor	
2010	Dragon Age: Origins – Awakening	Master Wade, additional voices	As Patrick Fraley
2010	Arcania: Gothic 4	Various	
2011	Dungeon Siege III	Meister Sigismund Wulf	
2012	Kinect Star Wars	Civilian	
2015	Kung Fu Panda: Showdown of Legendary Legends	General Kai "The Collector"	As Patrick Fraley; Replacing J.K. Simmons
2015	Skylanders: SuperChargers	Additional voices	
2024	Teenage Mutant Ninja Turtles: Wrath of the Mutants	80's Kraang	

=== Theme parks ===
Year	Title	Role	Notes
1998	Buzz Lightyear's Space Ranger Spin	Buzz Lightyear	
1999	The Amazing Adventures of Spider-Man	Hobgoblin	Replacing Mark Hamill
2005	Buzz Lightyear's Astro Blasters	Buzz Lightyear	Archival recordings

=== Web series ===
- Hanazuki: Full of Treasures – Doughy Bunington

=== Live shows ===
- Disney on Ice – Buzz Lightyear (voice)
