= Bismark (TV series) =

Japanese animated television series

- Promotional art
- 星銃士ビスマルク
- Genre: Space Western
- Developed by: Mitsuru Majima
- Directed by: Masami Anno; Akira Shigino (Note: Chief director)
- Music by: Osamu Totsuka
- Opening theme: "Fushigi Call Me" by MIO
- Ending theme: "Yume Ginga" by MIO
- Country of origin: Japan
- Original language: Japanese
- No. of episodes: 51

Production
- Executive producers: Yuji Nunokawa; Yoshitaka Suzuki
- Producers: Norio Hatsukawa (NTV); Yuko Mitsumori (Pierrot)
- Editor: Seiji Morita
- Production company: Studio Pierrot

Original release
- Network: NNS (NTV)
- Release: October 7, 1984 – September 29, 1985

Related
- Saber Rider and the Star Sheriffs

Star Musketeer Bismark (星銃士ビスマルク, Sei Jūshi Bisumaruku), also known as simply Bismark, is a Japanese anime television series created by Studio Pierrot. The series itself seems to draw inspiration from both the Super Sentai and the Metal Hero Series franchises. It is said the show is a love letter to the genre at the time. The series aired on Nippon TV and its affiliates from October 7, 1984, to September 25, 1985, totaling 51 episodes. In 1986, the rights to Bismark were sold to the United States company World Events Productions (WEP). WEP reorganized and rewrote the series, incorporating most of the original episodes and creating six new ones before releasing it under the name Saber Rider and the Star Sheriffs.

== Plot ==
In the year 2069, humanity begins to terraform and colonize the Solar System. In order to protect the colonies and maintain law and order in the Solar System, the Earth Federation Government (EFG) was created. Soon, many settlers started to resent the EFG and its sphere of influence, straining the relationship between the central government and the colonies.

While a strained peace was being forged between Earth and the colonies, a race of non-human creatures known as Deathcula invaded the System in 2084. Without provocation, they attacked the colonies and killed many of the colonists. The EFG quickly realized that the Deathcula were technologically superior and their forces were hopelessly outmatched. In order to have a chance at survival, Dr. Charles Louvre developed a transformable starship known as the Bismarck.

Knowing that an advanced team of specialists were required to operate the Bismarck, four individuals came together and were charged with keeping the outer colonies safe from further Deathcula attacks.

== Characters ==
=== Bismarck Team ===
Shinji Hikari (輝 進児, Hikari Shinji)
Voiced by: Yoku Shioya
Shinji Hikari is the 17-year-old Japanese chief pilot and tactical leader of the Bismarck team. He is the son of Shinjiro Hikari, a fighter squadron commander of the Solar System Federation Forces who died performing a ramming attack against the Deathcula mothership during the battle near Saturn 15 years prior. Shinji underwent training at the special training facility (特殊訓練所, Tokushu Kunrenjo). Following an insubordination against his instructor, he was scheduled to face an inquiry committee. While still under investigation, he broke out of the facility and went missing. During this time, he entered the Mars 24-Hour Race, finishing in first place and, according to the race announcer, likely setting a new course record.

General Secretary Dr. Louvre personally selected Shinji as the chief pilot of Bismarck, overriding cabinet objections regarding his pending inquiry; following the unit's first mission, Shinji's prior actions were vindicated and his disciplinary record was cleared.
Serving as Dr. Louvre's Special Envoy rather than a soldier of the Earth Federation Army, he holds executive command over the team, making the tactical decisions during combat and operating the Main Control System.

Shinji maintains a rational and composed demeanor during combat, deducing enemy traps and strategies while suppressing his own fears to fulfill his duties as leader. He has known Marianne since childhood; while he is socially confident around women and shares casual routines with her, he maintains a professional distance throughout the war.

Although he briefly drops this reserve after the team is dissolved following a peace treaty, he resumes his duty and emotional restraint when the Deathcula break the treaty and the unit is reactivated.
Richard Lancelot (リチャード・ランスロット, Richādo Ransurotto)
Voiced by: Bin Shimada
Richard Lancelot is an 18-year-old Scottish agent assigned to the Bismarck team by the English Royalty's special intelligence division. He is generally depicted as being a gentleman with a cool head for tactics and decisions. Richard is an expert with both swords and horses, and is described as "legendary" for his skills and marksmanship. Having great pride in his Scottish heritage, Richard is also proficient at playing the bagpipes, and yearns to return home to his girlfriend, Sincia.
Bill Willcox (ビル・ウィルコックス, Biru U~irukokkusu)
Voiced by: Kazuhiko Inoue
Bill Willcox is a famous 16-year-old American jet pilot and sharpshooter, and holds an almost infallible accuracy with firearms. When his parents were killed by the Deathcula, Bill devoted his life to avenging them, and this feeling continues even after becoming part of the Bismarck team. The jokester of the group, Bill is a friendly and disarming charmer, and somewhat of a loner. He is also an outrageous flirt, making mostly unsuccessful passes at nearly every woman he meets.
Marianne Louvre (マリアン・ルヴェール, Marian Ruvu~ēru)
Voiced by: Chie Kōjiro
Marianne Louvre is the 15-year-old daughter of Professor Charles Louvre, is of French nationality and is the engineer who led the construction of the Bismarck. A computer genius, Marianne was the chief envoy from the colonies to Earth. When the Deathcula attack, she calls on the colonies to join the EFG. During this meeting between the colony leaders, Marianne is chosen to join the Bismarck team, much to the pleasure of her father. Marianne is very technically minded, and most often helps her teammates from her station aboard the Bismarck. A brave girl, she is normally quite repulsed with the idea of killing anyone, even Deathcula. Marianne and Shinji have known each other since childhood, and soon become romantically involved.
Charles Louvre (ルヴェール事務総長, Ruvu~ēru jimu sōchō)
Voiced by: Hiroshi Ito
Professor Charles Louvre is a scientist on Ganymede, and the father of Marianne Louvre. A well-respected politician, he founded the Bismarck Team during the second Deathcula attack in order to fight the Deathcula, and decided to use the most powerful arm of the EFG, the Bismarck robot, to defend the area around Ganymede. Louvre personally chooses Shinji Hikari as team leader.
General Domes (ドメス将軍, Domesu shōgun)
Voiced by: Mikio Terashima
General Domes is the ruler of the Eastern part of Ganymede and a former comrade of Shinji's father. Shinji often approaches him to learn more about his father, to which Domes refuses to say every time.

=== Deathcula ===
Deathcula (デスキュラ星人, Desukyura-seijin; lit. 'Inhabitants of Planet Deathcula') are aliens who, after destroying their own planet in an internal war, transferred onto the planet Metheus. Unfortunately, this planet was also dying, so the Deathcula chose to leave it and conquer the Solar System. Their technology is quite advanced, and their society is one of discipline and obedience. Physically Deathcula look and act like humans, except that they have pointed ears and canine teeth. Due to this similarity, Deathcula are easily able to infiltrate and imitate humans.

Leader Hyuza (ヒューザー総統, Hyūzā Sōtō)
Voiced by: Seizō Katō
Hyuza is the leader of the Deathcula, and is a tall, frightening cyborg with a demonic death mask for a face. Hyuza lost his body in the battle of Saturn 15 years ago, when Shinji's father destroyed his spacecraft. He transferred his brain in the main computer of Hell's Paradise, and then connected it to a mechanical body, becoming a cyborg. Cold and cunning, Hyuza wishes revenge toward humans so badly that he chooses as one of his plans the idea to smash Hell's Paradise into Earth, even if this means killing himself and his people as well. Thankfully, the Bismarck team stops this and destroys Hell's Paradise, killing both him and Perios and ending his reign of terror once and for all. His most trusted commanders are Perios and Gustav, but nevertheless Hyuza keeps them under tight control.
Perios (ペリオス, Periosu)
Voiced by: Hirotaka Suzuoki
Perios is called from Andromeda by Hyuza himself, becoming Hyuza's most trusted subordinate. Perios is a cold, self-centered strategist, is a great pilot and sharpshooter, and is good at manipulating others. He is extremely ambitious, fears no one and is overly tenacious. During the war, Perios become Bill's most dangerous rival. He is eventually killed alongside Hyuza when the Bismarck team destroys Hell's Paradise.
Zatola (ザトラー, Zatorā)
Voiced by: Banjō Ginga
Zatola wears a grotesque helmet, and as one of the main rivals of the Bismarck Team is the commander who orchestrates the Ganymede invasion. He receives legions of soldiers for battle, and his directives come from Hyuza himself. On occasion he can be seen infiltrating the human colonies. He seems to fear Hyuza, but is also quite loyal to him. He perishes after a duel with Shinji on Ganymede while the Bismarck is destroying his base.
Gustav (ギュスター, Gyusutā)
Voiced by: Kenichi Ogata
An aide of Hyuza and Perios' former superior. He sees through Perios' plans and tries to warn the other Deathcula generals to no avail.

== Songs ==
Opening theme
"Mystery CALL ME" (不思議CALL ME, Fushigi CALL ME) by MIO
Ending theme
"Galaxy Dream" (夢銀河, Yume Ginga) by MIO

== Adaptation ==
When purchased by WEP in 1986, the studio reorganized and rewrote the series, and incorporated six newly written and animated episodes into the original Bismarck story before releasing it in 1987 under the name Saber Rider and the Star Sheriffs. Saber Rider ran for 52 episodes between 1987 and 1988.

In Saber Rider, the majority of the action is moved out of the solar system and into the rest of the galaxy. As opposed to a private group of four, the characters were written to be a small portion of a major military enforcement group known as the Star Sheriffs. Scenes of the main characters relaxing at a night club or bar and drinking alcohol were explained as "visiting a soda shop". Also, since showing death on American cartoons was much less accepted at that time, the Outriders were shown to "jump" back to their own dimension when defeated.

Shinji's name was changed to Fireball, a professional race car driver who had a crush on April Eagle (Marianne). Richard's name was changed to the titular Saber Rider, who was now the leader of the group. Bill became Colt and was part of a traveling rodeo until tragedy struck, after which he joined the Star Sheriffs. Marianne Louvre was renamed April Eagle, and became a former tennis pro whose three love interests were Saber Rider, Jesse Blue, and Fireball. Professor Charles Louvre was renamed Commander Eagle, and was the leader of Cavalry Command and the Star Sheriffs.

The Deathcula became The Outriders. In the new storyline, the Outriders were humanoids who come from another dimension called the Vapor Zone. They wanted to conquer mankind and control the universe unhindered, thinking the human dimension has much more to offer than their own. When an Outrider was shot or wounded, they did not die, but rather performed a "dimension jump", a process where they vanished and returned to their home dimension to reform.

Hyuza was given the name Nemesis, and his story was altered so that he was the evil genius in charge of the renegade Outriders and the mastermind behind their insidious schemes. Perios became Jesse Blue, a promising cadet at Cavalry Command until he fell in love with April Eagle during a training exercise. When April rejected his advances, he turned against the Star Sheriffs and cultivated a personal grudge against Saber Rider, ultimately becoming a fugitive, and joining forces with the Outriders. Zatola was known as Gattler.

The American animation used for the extra six episodes of Saber Rider was visibly different from the Japanese animation. Though the basic character designs remained the same, the style was vastly different from the original character art by Shigeru Kato. These new episodes were made to help enforce the changes made to the series, such as enforcing the "Western" theme with Cowboys and Indians, expanding on the Cavalry Command military structure, as well as showing visual evidence of Outriders reforming in their home dimension.

== Episodes ==
	Star Musketeer Bismark	Written by		Saber Rider and the Star Sheriffs
1	"The Space Adventurers" (宇宙の冒険野郎)	Mitsuru Majima	1	"Star Sheriff Round Up"
2	"Me, Him and That Varmint" (俺とあいつとあの野郎)	Mitsuru Majima	4	"Iguana Get To Know You"
3	"The Little Sheriff" (小さな名保安官)	Mitsuo Aimono	7	"Little Pardner"
4	"Shoot the Deathcula Spy!" (デスキュラ・スパイを撃て！)	Kazuhito Hisajima	8	"Brawling Is My Calling"
5	"Clash!! Desert Showdown" (激突！！ 荒野の決戦)	Mitsuru Majima	16	"Show Down At Cimarron Pass"
6	"The Secret of Beautiful Ellis" (美少女エリスの秘密)	Mitsuru Majima; Toshie Sasano	19	"Sole Survivor"
7	"A Small Love Story" (小さな愛の物語)	Mitsuo Aimono	20	"Legend Of The Santa Fe Express"
8	"The Mysterious Space Horses" (謎のスペース・ホース)	Mitsuo Aimono	9	"Wild Horses Couldn't Drag Me Away"
9	"Fight to Tomorrow" (明日への戦い)	Mitsuo Aimono	27	"The Hole In The Wall Gang"
10	"The Lion-Hearted General of Ganymede" (ガニメデの鬼将軍)	Mitsuru Majima	22	"Famous Last Words"
11	"The Aging Phoenix" (老いたる不死鳥)	Mitsuru Majima	23	"Sharpshooter"
12	"Christmas Carol Under the Stars" (星空のクリスマスカロル)	Mitsuru Majima	24	"The Monarch Supreme"
13	"Shinigami Kid" (死神キッド)	Mitsuo Aimono	21	"Snake Eyes"
14	"Duel in the Snow" (白銀の決闘)	Mitsuru Majima; Toshie Sasano	29	"Snow-Blind"
15	"Last Shooting" (ラスト・シューティング)	Mitsuru Majima	5	"Little Hombre"
16	"Chivalry Lives Again" (よみがえる騎士道)	Mitsuo Aimono	10	"The Castle Of The Mountain Haze"
17	"Defend Your Own Village" (君の手で村を守れ)	Tsunehisa Ito	30	"Tranquility"
18	"A Saint from Hell" (地獄から来た聖者)	Mitsuru Majima	41	"The Amazing Lazardo"
19	"Uncover the Secret Assassination Plot" (秘密暗殺計画を暴け)	Mitsuo Aimono	42	"I Forgot"
20	"A Dangerous Visitor" (危険な来訪者)	Mitsuru Majima; Toshie Sasano	X	—
21	"The Robot Show of Terror" (恐怖のロボット・ショー)	Tsunehisa Ito	6	"Greatest Show On The New Frontier"
22	"Explosive Death Race" (爆発！！ 死のレース)	Mitsuo Aimono	28	"The All Galaxy Grand Prix"
23	"Captain Holliday" (キャプテン・ホリデー)	Mitsuo Aimono	X	—
24	"The Four Leaf Clover" (四つ葉のクローバー)	Mitsuru Majima; Toshie Sasano	12	"Four Leaf Clover"
25	"Fierce Attack! Blaster Pulse" (猛撃！ ブラスター・パルス)	Mitsuru Majima	37	"Born on the Bayou"
26	"The Final Showdown on Ganymede" (ガニメデ最後の決戦)	Mitsuru Majima	25	"Gattler's Last Stand"
27	"Renewed Determination, Act 1" (新たなる決意 ACT-1)	Kazuhito Hisajima	35	"The Challenge (1)"
28	"Renewed Determination, Act 2" (新たなる決意 ACT-2)	Kazuhito Hisajima	36	"The Challenge (2)"
29	"Reunion and Takeoff" (再会、そして旅立ち)	Mitsuru Majima	14	"What Did You Do On Your Summer Vacation?"
30	"Fight for Peace!" (戦え！ 平和のために)	Mitsuru Majima; Toshie Sasano	X	—
31	"The Man from Andromeda" (アンドロメダから来た男)	Mitsuo Aimono; Mitsuru Majima	15	"Jesse Blue"
32	"The Deathcula Hunter" (デスキュラ・ハンター)	Minoru Shinbayashi	26	"Dooley"
33	"Attack the Ghost Squadron!" (幽霊戦隊を叩け！)	Tsunehisa Ito	31	"Bad Day At Dry Gulch"
34	"Wish Upon a Rainbow!" (虹に願いを!)	Mitsuo Aimono	43	"Lend Me Your Ears"
35	"Soldier Girl Chiruka" (女戦士チルカ)	Toshie Sasano	40	"Jesse's Girl"
36	"The Juno Evacuation Operation" (ジュノー星救出作戦)	Mitsuru Majima	X	—
37	"A 50 Percent Chance" (50%の賭け)	Mitsuo Aimono	38	"April Rides"
38	"Naughty Wars!" (わんぱくWARS！)	Tsunehisa Ito	39	"The Walls Of Red Wing"
39	"The Evil Field of the Planet Leto" (魔のレト星フィールド)	Toshie Sasano	33	"Sneaky Spies"
40	"The Time I Faced Sincerity" (真心が見えた時)	Mitsuo Aimono	32	"Snowcone"
41	"Planet of Dinosaurs" (恐竜の星)	Tsunehisa Ito	11	"Oh Boy! Dinosaurs!"
42	"Giant Fortress Dead Ahead!" (大要塞接近！)	Mitsuo Aimono	X	—
43	"Deathcula's Secret" (デスキュラの秘密)	Mitsuru Majima	44	"Born To Run"
44	"Legend of a Planet" (星の神話)	Mitsuo Aimono	45	"The Legend Of The Lost World"
45	"The Rescue of Dr. Louvelle" (奪回！ ルヴェール博士)	Toshie Sasano	46	"The Rescue"
46	"Bismark Disassembled!" (ビスマルク解体！)	Mitsuru Majima; Toshie Sasano	47	"Eagle Has Landed"
47	"Soldiers Resurrected" (戦士の復活)	Mitsuo Aimono	48	"Cease Fire"
48	"Hyper-Photon Cannon, Fire!" (ハイパーフォトン砲発射！)	Tsunehisa Ito	49	"Alamo Moon"
49	"Destroy Helperides!" (ヘルペリデスを撃破せよ！)	Mitsuru Majima; Toshie Sasano	50	"The Nth Degree"
50	"Escape from Helperides" (ヘルペリデス脱出. )	Kazuhito Hisajima	51	"Who is Nemesis?"
51	"Galaxy Dream" (夢銀河)	Kazuhito Hisajima	52	"Happy Trails"
X	—		2	"Cavalry Command"
X	—		3	"Jesse's Revenge"
X	—		13	"The Highlanders"
X	—		17	"The Saber And The Tomahawk"
X	—		18	"All That Glitters"
X	—		34	"Stampede"
