= Fun Channel =

The Fun Channel
- Country: Bahrain; Chile
- Broadcast area: Bahrain; Chile

Programming
- Languages: English (Bahrain); Arabic (Bahrain); Spanish (Chile)
- Picture format: 4:3

Ownership
- Owner: Orbit Network

History
- Launched: 19 November 1994 (Bahrain); 18 June 1995 (Chile)
- Closed: 2000 (Chile); 1 September 2010 (Bahrain)

Fun Channel was a Bahraini television channel owned by the Orbit Network. Fun Channel contains cartoons for children from early morning to evening such as The Why Why Family and Dennis the Menace. From late night to early morning, it contains shows for pre-teens and older such as California Dreams and Hang Time.

Between 2005 and 2010, it used to simulcast Jetix Play.

== History ==
Launched in 1994, Fun Channel broadcasts family-friendly entertainment, including animated and live action shows. On 14 April 2004, Fun Channel changed its logo and added more animated shows to its lineup. Fun Channel primarily airs in Bahrain, although it was also available in Chile with the network and programming dubbed into Spanish. The Chilean version of the Fun Channel was launched on 18 June 1995 and closed down in 2000.
