= Gordon Hunt (director) =

American filmmaker (1929–2016)

- Born: Gordon Edwynn Hunt; April 26, 1929; Pasadena, California, U.S.
- Died: December 17, 2016 (aged 87); Los Angeles, California, U.S.
- Occupations: Recording director; television director; stage director; producer; writer; actor; voice actor
- Years active: 1959–2016
- Spouses: Jane Elizabeth Novis (divorced); B.J. Ward (m. 1995)
- Children: Helen Hunt
- Relatives: Peter H. Hunt (paternal half-brother)

Gordon Edwynn Hunt (April 26, 1929 – December 17, 2016) was an American writer, director and actor who worked in television, film, theatre and voice work.

He directed such animated productions as The Jetsons, Scooby-Doo, Super Friends, The Richie Rich Show, The Smurfs, Pound Puppies, Tom & Jerry Kids, The Pirates of Dark Water, Droopy, Master Detective and The New Adventures of Captain Planet.

== Early life and career ==
Hunt was born on Friday, April 26, 1929, in Pasadena, California, the son of Helen F. (née Roberts; originally Rothenberg) and George Smith Hunt II, an industrial designer. He also had a younger half-brother, director and lighting designer Peter H. Hunt. His mother was from a German-Jewish family. His father was from Minnesota, and was a Mayflower descendant, of English origin.

He had been working as a freelance director in New York City before being hired to work at the Mark Taper Forum in Los Angeles, where he served as their casting director for ten years. He was then hired by Joseph Barbera to direct animated series at Hanna-Barbera. His first voice directing job was Partridge Family 2200 A.D. in 1974.

With a prestigious twenty-year career at Hanna-Barbera, Hunt was now prominent in the voiceover forum, where he was a freelance director for multiple animated productions and video games. As a voice actor, he voiced the character of Wally in the animated adaptation of the comic strip Dilbert. He has often worked alongside colleague voice directors Ginny McSwain, Andrea Romano, Kris Zimmerman and Jamie Thomason. McSwain, Romano and Zimmerman had studied under him as animation casting directors and learned the profession from Hunt before becoming voice directors themselves. Andrea Romano considers him to be her mentor, who makes actors feel so comfortable and relaxed that she said, "Nobody does not like Gordon".

He directed many television series, of which most were situation comedies. In 1996, he received the Directors Guild of America Award; "Outstanding Directorial Achievement in Comedy Series" for Mad About You's episode The Alan Brady Show. Hunt also voice directed multiple video games. Among the games he worked on are Pandemonium, the God of War series, Lair, Final Fantasy XIV, Blur, the Legacy of Kain series, and the Uncharted series. He also served as motion capture director on Uncharted: Golden Abyss.

== Personal life ==
He was the father of actress Helen Hunt from his marriage to photographer Jane Elizabeth Novis; they later divorced. He later married voice actress B.J. Ward in 1995, they remained married until Hunt's death in 2016.

== Death ==
Hunt died in Los Angeles, California, on Saturday, December 17, 2016, of complications from Parkinson's disease at the age of 87.

== Filmography ==
=== Recording director ===
Animated television series
Year	Title	Notes
1974	ABC Afterschool Specials	Episode: "Cyrano"
1974–1975	Partridge Family 2200 A.D.	
1974–1975	These Are the Days	
1975–1978	The Great Grape Ape Show	
1980	The Flintstone Comedy Show	
1980	The Richie Rich/Scooby-Doo Show	
1980–1983	The All New Popeye Hour	
1981	The Kwicky Koala Show	
1980–1981	The Fonz and the Happy Days Gang	
1980–1982	Super Friends	
1980–1984	The Richie Rich Show	
1981–1982	Laverne & Shirley in the Army	
1981–1982	Trollkins	
1981–1982	Space Stars	
1981–1989	The Smurfs	
1982	The Gary Coleman Show	
1982–1983	Mork & Mindy/Laverne & Shirley/Fonz Hour	Recording director for Laverne & Shirley
1982–1983	The Scooby & Scrappy-Doo/Puppy Hour	
1982–1983	Pac-Man	
1982–1984	The Little Rascals	
1982–1984	Shirt Tales	
1983	The Dukes	
1983	Monchhichis	
1983–1984	The New Scooby and Scrappy-Doo Show	
1983–1984	The Biskitts	
1983–1984	ABC Weekend Specials	3 episodes
1984–1985	Super Friends: The Legendary Super Powers Show	
1984–1985	Challenge of the GoBots	
1984–1986	Pink Panther and Sons	
1984–1988	Yogi's Treasure Hunt	
1984–1989	Snorks	
1985	The Greatest Adventure: Stories from the Bible	
1985	Galtar and the Golden Lance	
1985	CBS Storybreak	11 episodes
1985	The 13 Ghosts of Scooby-Doo	
1985–1986	The Super Powers Team: Galactic Guardians	
1985–1986	Paw Paws	
1985–1987	The Jetsons	1980s revival of the original show
1986	Wildfire	
1986–1987	The New Adventures of Jonny Quest	
1986–1987	Pound Puppies	
1986–1988	Foofur	
1986–1988	The Flintstone Kids	
1987	Sky Commanders	
1987	Popeye and Son	
1988	The New Yogi Bear Show	
1988	The Completely Mental Misadventures of Ed Grimley	Recording Director for "Ed Grimley" and "Amazing Gustav Brothers" segments Casting Director for "Count Floyd" segment
1988–1990	Fantastic Max	
1988–1991	A Pup Named Scooby-Doo	
1989	The Further Adventures of SuperTed	
1990	Gravedale High	
1990	Midnight Patrol: Adventures in the Dream Zone	
1990	Paddington Bear	
1990–1991	Bill & Ted's Excellent Adventures	
1990–1991	Wake, Rattle, and Roll	Animated segments only
1990–1991	The Adventures of Don Coyote and Sancho Panda	
1990–1991	Timeless Tales from Hallmark	
1990–1994	Tom & Jerry Kids	
1991	Yo Yogi!	
1991–1993	The Pirates of Dark Water	
1992	Fish Police	
1992–1993	The Addams Family	
1992–1995	Capitol Critters	
1993–1994	Droopy, Master Detective	
1993–1995	Captain Planet and the Planeteers	33 episodes

=== Animated specials and films ===
Animated specials and films
Year	Title	Notes
1982	Yogi Bear's All Star Comedy Christmas Caper	
1983	Lucky Luke: The Daltons on the Run	English Version
1987	The Little Troll Prince	
1987	The Jetsons Meet the Flintstones	
1987	Scooby-Doo Meets the Boo Brothers	
1987	Yogi's Great Escape	
1987	Top Cat and the Beverly Hills Cats	
1987	Yogi Bear and the Magical Flight of the Spruce Goose	
1987	Rock Odyssey	
1987	'Tis The Season to Be Smurfy	
1988	Scooby-Doo and the Ghoul School	
1988	The Good, the Bad, and Huckleberry Hound	
1988	Yogi and the Invasion of the Space Bears	
1988	Scooby-Doo and the Reluctant Werewolf	
1988	Daffy Duck's Quackbusters	
1988	Rockin' with Judy Jetson	
1989	Hanna-Barbera's 50th: A Yabba Dabba Doo Celebration	
1990	The Yum Yums: The Day Things Went Sour	
1990	Jetsons: The Movie	
1992	Tom and Jerry: The Movie	
1992	Monster in My Pocket: The Big Scream	
1993	I Yabba-Dabba Do!	
1993	Hollyrock-a-Bye Baby	
1993	Jonny's Golden Quest	
1993	Nick and Noel	
1993	The Halloween Tree	
1993	The Town Santa Forgot	
1993	A Flintstone Family Christmas	

=== Animated shorts ===
Animated specials and movies
Year	Title	Notes
1987	The Duxorcist	Daffy Duck cartoon
1988	The Night of the Living Duck	Daffy Duck cartoon
1998	Chicken Little	

=== Video games ===
Video games
Year	Title	Notes
1996	Pandemonium	
1996	Blazing Dragons	
1999	Legacy of Kain: Soul Reaver	
2001	Soul Reaver 2	
2002	Blood Omen 2	
2003	Star Trek: Elite Force II	
2003	The Italian Job	
2003	Legacy of Kain: Defiance	
2004	ShellShock: Nam '67	
2004	Forgotten Realms: Demon Stone	
2005	SOCOM 3 U.S. Navy SEALs	
2005	SOCOM U.S. Navy SEALs: Fireteam Bravo	
2006	Lara Croft Tomb Raider: Legend	
2006	SOCOM U.S. Navy SEALs: Fireteam Bravo 2	
2006	SOCOM U.S. Navy SEALs: Combined Assault	
2007	God of War II	
2007	Uncharted: Drake's Fortune	
2007	Tomb Raider: Anniversary	
2007	Lair	
2009	Uncharted 2: Among Thieves	
2010	God of War III	
2010	God of War: Ghost of Sparta	
2010	Final Fantasy XIV	
2010	Blur	
2011	Uncharted 3: Drake's Deception	
2011	Uncharted: Golden Abyss	

=== Voice director ===
Animated television series
Year	Title	Notes
1993	Mighty Max	
1994	The Bears Who Saved Christmas	
1994	Exosquad	
1996–1998	Adventures from the Book of Virtues	
2000–2001	God, the Devil and Bob	

=== Actor: animated and film roles ===
Actor
Year	Title	Role	Notes
1984	Crimes of Passion	Group Leader	Live-Action role
1985	Waiting to Act	Acting Coach Lars	Live-Action role
1989	Cheers	Gordon	Episode: "The Two Faces of Norm"
1991	(Blooper) Bunny	Director / Man in Audience / Movers	Animated short
1991	Trancers II	Mustard Man	Live-Action role
1992–1993	The Addams Family	Additional voices	Animated series
1992–1995	Capitol Critters	Additional voices	"The KiloWatts Riot"
1993	Hollyrock-a-Bye Baby	Additional voices	Television animated movie
1993–1994	Bonkers	Additional voices	"A Woolly Bully," "Fall-Apart Land"
1998	Mad About You	TV Host	Episode: "Paul Slips in the Shower"
1999–2000	Dilbert	Wally	Animated series
2013	I Know That Voice	Himself	Documentary
