= B. J. Ward (actress) =

American actress

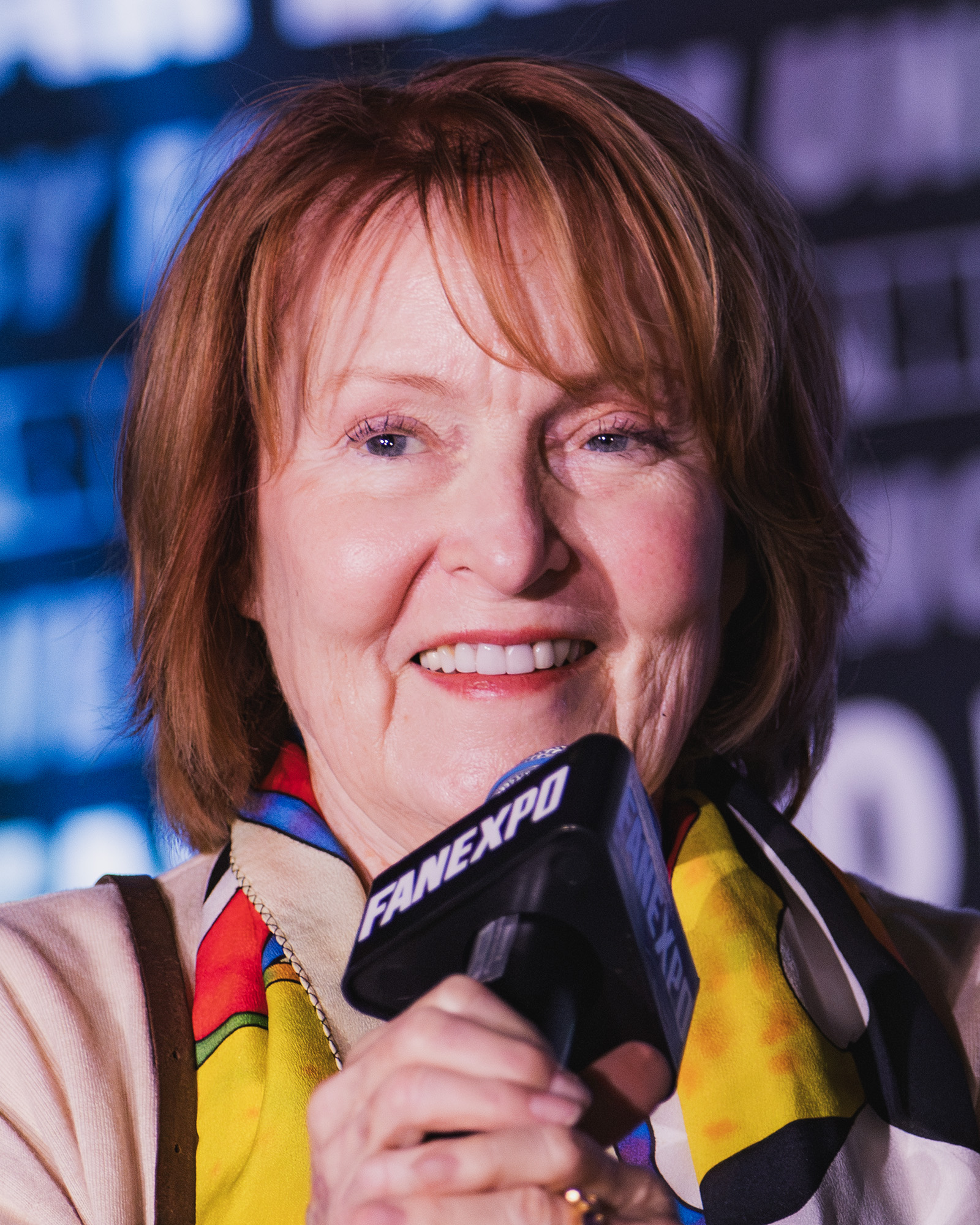
- Ward in 2026
- Born: Betty Jean Ward; September 12, 1944 (age 82); Wilmington, Delaware, U.S.
- Occupations: Actress; singer
- Years active: 1960–present
- Agent: SBV Talent Agency
- Spouses: Donn Trenner (m. 1966; div. 1978); Gordon Hunt (m. 1995; died 2016)
- Website: bjwardnow.com

Betty Jean Ward (born September 12, 1944) is an American actress. She is the creator and the star of Stand-Up Opera, a musical one-woman show.

== Personal life ==
Ward was first married to Donald Trenner in 1966, they divorced in 1978. She was later married to director Gordon Hunt from 1995 until his death in 2016.

== Career ==
=== Early career ===
She made her debut on the stage in 1960, in the original off-Broadway production of The Fantasticks, where she was an understudy for the role of Luisa/the Girl. B.J. Ward had gotten the part by calling the producer of the show.

She toured with the Groundlings for a short while before starting her own voice over career starting with Hanna-Barbera's Jana of the Jungle in 1978.

=== Singing career ===
Ward also worked as a singer. She is well known for her acclaimed one-woman show, "Stand-Up Opera", which became a massive success with critics and audiences alike. She has released seven albums throughout her singing career.

Though Ward is best known as a voice actress, she has also appeared on television. In 1985, she made a rare film appearance in the television film Malice in Wonderland alongside Elizabeth Taylor and Jane Alexander. She has guest-starred on television series such as Frasier, ER, and In-Laws.

== Filmography ==
=== Television ===
Year	Title	Role	Notes
1978	Jana of the Jungle	Jana	Main role (13 episodes)
1978	The New Maverick	B.J. Vinnie's Henchman	Television film
1981	Space Stars	Elektra	11 episodes
1982	Spider-Man	Medusa, Namorita	2 episodes
1982–83	The Little Rascals	Butch, Waldo	33 episodes
1982–83	The Incredible Hulk	Betty Ross, Alicia Masters	13 episodes
1984–85	Pink Panther and Sons	Panky, Punkin	26 episodes
1984–85	Super Friends	Jayna, Wonder Woman, young Bruce Wayne	10 episodes
1984–85	The Littles	Ashley Little	16 episodes
1984–85	Voltron	Princess Allura, additional voices	Main cast (122 episodes)
1984–88	Snorks	Casey Kelp	65 episodes
1985	The 13 Ghosts of Scooby-Doo	Marcella	Episode: "When You Witch Upon a Star"
1985	Star Fairies	Sparkle, Michelle	Television film
1985	Challenge of the GoBots	Small Foot	5 episodes
1985–86	G.I. Joe: A Real American Hero	Scarlett	38 episodes
1986–87	Centurions	Cassandra Cross, Lilith Cross	2 episodes; uncredited
1986–87	My Little Pony	North Star, Surprise	4 episodes
1986–88	The Flintstone Kids	Betty Rubble, Mrs. Rockbottom	34 episodes
1987	DuckTales	Birdie McQuack, Loopie McQuack	Episode: "Top Duck"
1987	Popeye and Son	Rad	2 episodes
1987	Sky Commanders	Erica Slade	2 episodes
1987	The Little Troll Prince	Bjorn's Wife	Television film
1988	The Good, the Bad, and Huckleberry Hound	Various voices	Television film
1988	Superman	Wonder Woman	Episode: "Superman and Wonder Woman vs. the Sorceress of Time"
1988	A Pup Named Scooby-Doo	Sugie Rogers, Betsy Brainy	2 episodes
1988	The Flintstone Kids' "Just Say No" Special	Betty Rubble, Mrs. Gravelson, Announcer	Television special
1988	Rockin' with Judy Jetson	Zippy	Television film
1988	Scooby-Doo! and the Reluctant Werewolf	Googie, Repulsa	Television film
1989	Matlock	Bernice Wooley	Episode: "The Black Widow"
1990	Tiny Toon Adventures	Honey	Episode: "Fields of Honey"
1990	The Wizard of Oz	Glinda	13 episodes
1991	Darkwing Duck	Patricia, Gloria Swansong	2 episodes
1991	TaleSpin	Records Clerk	Episode: "Louie's Last Stand"
1992	Fish Police	Widow Casino	Episode: "The Shell Game"
1993	I Yabba-Dabba Do!	Betty Rubble	Television film
1993	Jonny's Golden Quest	3-DAC	Television film
1993	Bonkers	Hildy	Episode: "What You Read Is What You Get"
1993	Murder, She Wrote	Chairwoman	Episode: "Love's Deadly Desire"
1993	Hollyrock-a-Bye Baby	Betty Rubble	Television film
1994	Captain Planet and the Planeteers	Federal Spokesman	Episode: "Twilight Ozone"
1994	Aladdin	Jackal Girl	Episode: "Moonlight Madness"
1994	A Flintstones Christmas Carol	Betty Rubble	Television film
1995	Batman: The Animated Series	M3	Episode: "The Lion and the Unicorn"
1995	Daisy-Head Mayzie	Mrs. McGrew	Television special
1995–96	Dumb and Dumber	Various voices	2 episodes
1995–96	Gargoyles	Lydia Duane, Fleance, Lady of the Lake, Alexander Fox	4 episodes
1996–97	The Real Adventures of Jonny Quest	Iris, Nurse Holloway	8 episodes
1997	What a Cartoon!	Melissa, Computer	2 episodes
1997	The Angry Beavers	Computer	Episode: "House Broken"
1997	Johnny Bravo	Velma Dinkley, Jebidisa, Mother	3 episodes
1998–2000	Voltron: The Third Dimension	Princess Allura, additional voices	26 episodes
1999–2002	The New Woody Woodpecker Show	Winnie Woodpecker	17 episodes
1999	The Sylvester & Tweety Mysteries	Madame Pamplemousse	Episode: "Dutch Tweet"
2002	Harvey Birdman, Attorney at Law	Velma Dinkley	Episode: "Shaggy Busted"
2002	Samurai Jack	Witch Hag	Episode: "Jack and the Zombies"
2007	Ben 10	Betty Tennyson	Episode: "Big Fat Alien Wedding"
2008	The Spectacular Spider-Man	Mayor Waters	Episode: "Persona"
2009	Curious George: A Very Monkey Christmas	Aunt Margaret	Television special
2010	Regular Show	Dr. Asinovskovich	Episode: "Grilled Cheese Deluxe"
2011	G.I. Joe: Renegades	Connie Hauser	Episode: "Homecoming"

=== Film ===
Year	Title	Role	Notes
1984	Gallavants	Galli	
1986	GoBots: Battle of the Rock Lords	Small Foot	
1987	G.I. Joe: The Movie	Scarlett	Direct-to-video
1988	Pound Puppies and the Legend of Big Paw	Whopper	
1988	Daffy Duck's Quackbusters	Thelma	
1991	The Little Engine That Could	Grumpella	
1993	Tom and Jerry: The Movie	Tom's Owner	
1994	The Pagemaster	Queen of Hearts	
1994	The Bears Who Saved Christmas	Mrs. Bucktooth	
1995	The Pebble and the Penguin	Magellanic Penguin	
1998	Hercules and Xena – The Animated Movie: The Battle for Mount Olympus	Tethys (singing voice)	Direct-to-video
1998	Scooby-Doo on Zombie Island	Velma Dinkley	Direct-to-video
1999	Scooby-Doo! and the Witch's Ghost	Velma Dinkley	Direct-to-video
1999	The Brave Little Toaster to the Rescue	Police Lady	Direct-to-video
2000	The Land Before Time VII: The Stone of Cold Fire	Rainbow Face (singing voice)	Direct-to-video
2000	Scooby-Doo and the Alien Invaders	Velma Dinkley	Direct-to-video
2001	Scooby-Doo and the Cyber Chase	Velma Dinkley	Direct-to-video
2016	DC Super Hero Girls: Hero of the Year	Master Alchemist	Direct-to-video

=== Video games ===
Year	Title	Role	Notes
1996	Down in the Dumps	Mrs. Blub, Computer, Grandma Louse, Mole	
1996	Blazing Dragons	Lady of the Lake, Rapunsel Yablanowitz	
1999	Sword of the Berserk: Guts' Rage	Casca, Eriza	
2000	Orphen: Scion of Sorcery	Sephy	
2000	Grandia II	Roan, Elmo	
2000	Scooby-Doo! Showdown in Ghost Town	Velma Dinkley	
2000	Scooby-Doo! Phantom of the Knight	Velma Dinkley	
2000	Scooby-Doo! Classic Creep Capers	Velma Dinkley	
2001	Scooby-Doo: Activity Challenge	Velma Dinkley	
2001	Scooby-Doo and the Cyber Chase	Velma Dinkley	
2001	Scooby-Doo! Jinx at the Sphinx	Velma Dinkley	
2002	Scooby-Doo! Night of 100 Frights	Velma Dinkley	
2002	Star Trek: Starfleet Command III	Romulan Officer	
2003	Arc the Lad: Twilight of the Spirits	Camellia	
2003	Star Trek: Elite Force II	Katarina Scott	
2004	Onimusha 3: Demon Siege	Henri Blanc	
2020	Samurai Jack: Battle Through Time	Witch Hag	

=== Theme Parks ===
Year	Title	Role	Notes
1993	Walt Disney's Carousel of Progress	Sarah	
2005	Robots of Mars 3D Adventure	Mechnical Voice	

== Discography ==
- Vocal Ease (1970)
- Queen of the Night (1994)
- Stand-Up Opera (1995)
- Syrinx: Voice of the Songbird (2003)
- B.J. Ward Sings Marshall Barer (2005)
- Double Feature: Love Songs From The Movies (2015)
- Double Feature 2: More Songs From The Movies! (2016)
