= Hollyrock-a-Bye Baby =

- Genre: Comedy
- Written by: Rich Fogel; Mark Seidenberg
- Directed by: William Hanna
- Voices of: Henry Corden; Jean Vander Pyl; Kath Soucie; Frank Welker; B.J. Ward; Jerry Houser; Janet Waldo; John Stephenson; Charlie Adler; Mark Hamill; Brad Garrett
- Composer: John Debney
- Country of origin: United States

Production
- Executive producers: William Hanna; Joseph Barbera
- Producer: Iwao Takamoto
- Running time: 91 minutes
- Production company: Hanna-Barbera Cartoons

Original release
- Network: ABC
- Release: December 5, 1993

Related
- I Yabba-Dabba Do!; A Flintstone Family Christmas

Hollyrock-a-Bye Baby (known in a working title as Hollyrock or Bust!) is a 1993 American animated made-for-television film based on the 1960s series classic, The Flintstones. It first aired on ABC on December 5, 1993. It is the sequel to I Yabba-Dabba Do! and is followed by A Flintstone Family Christmas, which aired less than two weeks later on the same network.

== Plot ==
After Pebbles and Bamm-Bamm get married and move to Hollyrock in I Yabba-Dabba Do!, Fred and Barney are both working overtime for Mr. Slate, and Wilma and Betty now own a food delivery service called "Bone Appetite", but much to Fred's disgust. Wilma is not there to cook for him, so he cooks his TV dinners and Barney's.

One day, the Flintstones and the Rubbles go to Hollyrock to visit their children, Pebbles and Bamm-Bamm (who is trying his luck at being a screenwriter), after Pebbles reveals that she's pregnant with her and Bamm-Bamm's first child. During the visit, they drive Pebbles and Bamm-Bamm crazy by telling them what to do now that Pebbles is going to have a baby.

Meanwhile, Fred and Barney try to help Bamm-Bamm sell his script but end up in a mess with a robbery of a giant pearl when it is mistaken for a bowling ball. Big Rock sends his henchmen Rocky and Slick to recover the giant pearl. Fred and Barney manage to get the tickets to a show's taping at ABC studios in hopes of selling Bamm-Bamm's script. Fred and Barney encounter Shelley Millstone in hopes of having her for Bamm-Bamm's film. It doesn't go well and the security guard is called in to eject them. A chase begins throughout the ABC studios and they eventually get thrown out.

Meanwhile, Wilma and Betty are designing a nursery when Pebbles reveals that she is attending the premiere of "It Came From the Tar Pits" starring Craig Craigmore. Fred and Barney decide to take advantage by finding someone to buy the screenplay. Rocky and Slick also slip in to get to Shelley Millstone in an attempt to get the giant pearl. Bamm-Bamm mistakes Slick and Rocky for movie producers. When they find Fred's car, they are attacked by Dino. Back at the party, Fred tries to get to Shelly Millstone, which ends up with Craig Craigmore being injured. The next day, Pebbles has Fred attend a baby training seminar while she does paperwork for her boss, Mr. Pyrite.

With Bamm-Bamm exhausted, Barney attends in Bamm-Bamm's place. Slick and Rocky follow Fred to the baby training seminar where Slick and Rocky infiltrate the class. It soon breaks up into a fight which ends up with Fred, Barney, Slick, and Rocky being thrown out. After a call from Rocky, Big Rock gets impatient and decides to take over the operation. Pebbles and Bamm-Bamm declare themselves unready for the baby after they were busy. Fred and Wilma try to get Pebbles to calm down until she breaks down. The next day while Fred apologizes to Pebbles about being too helpful, Pebbles attends a baby shower which her maternal grandmother, Pearl Slaghoople, also attends. Pearl sends Fred and Barney to get the baby supplies. At the grocery store, they end up gaining a lot of "Maps to the Stars' Homes" and decide to take another shot at Shelly Millstone.

Later that night, Fred and Barney sneak into Shelly's property and distract the guard dogs. Rocky and Slick show Big Rock the house where Fred and Barney are staying and mistake Pearl for Fred when they abduct her. The next morning, Fred confesses to Bamm-Bamm that he lost the script in Shelley Millstone's yard. They soon return a call from Big Rock who demands the giant pearl in exchange for Pearl's freedom. They are forced to give them the pearl for the exchange. They disguise a bowling ball as the pearl when they forget the giant pearl.

Pebbles goes into labor and they drive a bus towards the hospital with Big Rock, the real bus driver, and the OWNER of the bike the bus driver borrowed. There is a high-speed chase which attracts the local cops. Fred finally makes it to the hospital and Pebbles is taken into the hospital fast. Big Rock, Rocky, and Slick catch up to them and Bamm-Bamm arrives to take them down as the cops arrest the crooks. Pebbles gives birth to twins, Roxy (who has muscular strength like her father) and Chip (who has his Grandpa Flintstone's mouth because he's another chip off the old Flintstone). Shelly Millstone reveals that she got Bamm Bamm's script when Fred and Barney left it at her house and says she loves it, allowing Bamm-Bamm to sell his screenplay. Mr. Pyrite manages to get the script to Craig Craigmore and promotes Pebbles to Vice President. Fred and the others head back to Bedrock, leaving their children and grandchildren in happy harmony.

== Voice cast ==
- Henry Corden as Fred Flintstone
- Charlie Adler as Rocky
- Jean Vander Pyl as Wilma Flintstone
- Michael Bell as Mr. Pyrite
- Kath Soucie as Pebbles Flintstone-Rubble
- Brad Garrett as Big Rock
- Frank Welker as Barney Rubble, Dino, J. Rocko, Cop
- Mark Hamill as Slick
- B.J. Ward as Betty Rubble
- Mary Hart as Mary Hartstone
- Jerry Houser as Bamm-Bamm Rubble
- Howard Morris as Bird
- Janet Waldo as Pearl Pebbles-Slaghoople
- Don Messick as Baby Bamm-Bamm, Lot Security Guard, Tour Bus Driver
- John Stephenson as Mr. Slate, Cop
- Russi Taylor as Baby Pebbles
- John Tesh as John Teshadactyl
- Raquel Welch as Shelly Millstone

=== Additional voices ===
- Charlie Brill
- Ruth Buzzi
- Gordon Hunt
- Allan Lurie
- Brian Stokes Mitchell
- Megan Mullally
- Ronnie Schell
- April Winchell

== Home media ==
The movie was first released on VHS by Turner Home Entertainment in the 1990s in the UK and Australia.

Warner Archive released The Flintstones–Hollyrock-A-Bye Baby! on DVD in region 1 as part of their Hanna-Barbera Classic Collection on October 9, 2012, as the home media issue of this sequel was delayed for nearly two decades in the United States.

On August 4, 2020, Warner Bros. Home Entertainment gave it its first wide release as part of the DVD collection The Flintstones: 2 Movies & 5 Specials.

== Syndication ==
This sequel is considered very difficult to syndicate after its original broadcast mainly due to the involved suggestive material relating to child birth. However, it has eventually aired on Cartoon Network and Boomerang usually as part of Mother's Day special programming in the early 2000s until it never ran again. It is skipped from the Boomerang app.

== Sequel ==
A Flintstone Family Christmas was released in 1993.
