= List of Voltron characters =

This is a list of characters from Voltron.

== Voltron: Defender of the Universe ==
=== Lion Force Voltron (Golion Team) ===
- Keith Kogane (黄金旭; Akira Kogane) (voiced by Neil Ross in the 1980s and 1990s series and Giles Panton in the 2011 series): Commanding officer of the Voltron Force, who pilots the Black Lion that forms the head, torso and upper legs of Voltron. Keith is a quiet individual who spends much of his time pondering his decisions, thinking up new strategies, and simply being a leader. He also has a hobby of reading books and can often be found doing so either in the pilot's lounge, or in his room. He cherishes Princess Allura and is somewhat protective of her; his worst fear, according to Voltron: The Third Dimension, was that she would be forced to marry the evil Prince Lotor. In "Consider the Alternatives", the alternate version of Keith is undisciplined and considered a bad boy.

In the Devil's Due comic series, Keith originally ran a dojo prior to being recruited by Hawkins. He is given the full name Akira "Keith" Kogane.

- Lance McClain (黒鋼勇; Isamu Kurogane) (voiced by Michael Bell in the 1980s and 1990s series and Andrew Francis in the 2011 series): Second-in-command of the Voltron Force, who pilots the Red Lion that forms the right arm of Voltron. He is a tall man, both wiry and wily, and Lance is always cracking jokes and teasing others whenever he gets the chance. He is the only one in the group who contests any of Keith's commands. He is a great pilot, though reckless at times. In "Consider the Alternatives", the alternate Lance is very by the book and is much like Keith.

In the Devil's Due comic series, Lance's was forced into the mission to Arus due to his criminal record. He is given the full name Charles Lance McClain.

- Pidge (錫石宏; Hiroshi Suzuishi) (voiced by Neil Ross in the 1980s series, Billy West in the 1990s series, and Samuel Vincent in the 2011 series): Pidge is the youngest, most intelligent and smallest of the group; he pilots the Green Lion that forms the left arm of Voltron. His home planet Balto (Earth in the Japanese version) was destroyed by nuclear missiles from Emperor Zarkon. Pidge graduated from the academy at a young age, and his specialty is science. Like the others, he is well-trained in martial arts, and uses his size and agility to his advantage. In "Consider the Alternatives", the alternate Pidge has a very low IQ.

In the Devil's Due comic series, he is an orphan named Darrell "Pidge" Stoker who was recruited by the New West Point military academy.

- Hunk Garrett (青銅強; Tsuyoshi Seidou) (voiced by Lennie Weinrib in the 1980s series, Kevin Michael Richardson in the 1990s series, and Ty Olsson in the 2011 series): Hunk is the strong-man of the group, piloting the Yellow Lion that forms Voltron's lower left leg. He is shown wearing an orange uniform in the original series and a metallic yellow uniform in Voltron: The Third Dimension. While Hunk is tough and temperamental he also has a soft side, especially when it comes to children and puppies. He is never late for a meal. Though his friends tease him about his appetite, most of Hunk's bulk is muscle. In "Consider the Alternatives", the alternate Hunk is a super genius.

In the Devil's Due comic series, he is a Japanese-American man named Tsuyoshi "Hunk" Garrett with a Master's in engineering.

- Princess Allura (ファーラ姫; Princess Farla) (voiced by B.J. Ward in the 1980s and 1990s series and Ashleigh Ball in the 2011 series): Princess Allura of the planet Arus is the ruler of the Kingdom of Arus (Altea), as well as de facto ruler of the entire planet (though she does not have the title Queen regnant) and is also the object of Lotor's affections. Daughter of the late king Alfor, Allura inherited her father's authority on his death and is commander-in-chief and head of state for the planet Arus, and thus; commander Keith's superior. However, later she takes over for Sven as the pilot of the Blue Lion that forms Voltron's lower right leg and defers to Keith during operational engagements. In "Consider the Alternatives", the alternate Allura is a wild child, never growing up in the Castle of Lions and thus; never learned how to act properly. Although a bit naïve, especially with matters of romance, Allura is a strong-willed person and is very capable of ruling her planet, although some like Coran and Nanny tend to doubt this ability. She is capable of invoking the dead, particularly her father, the late king Alfor. Allura has a crush on Keith and these feelings eventually develop into true love. In Voltron: The Third Dimension, Allura learns special mind skills that could allow the Voltron Force to control the Lions without having to be in the cockpits and also helps the others to learn this as well.
- Sven Holgersson (銀貴; Takashi Shirogane) (voiced by Michael Bell in the 1980s series, and Alan Marriott in the 2011 series): Sven, a Norwegian pilot, was the original second-in-command of the Voltron Force. He piloted the Blue Lion and wore a black uniform at the very beginning of the series. In Episode 6, he was badly injured (killed in the Japanese version) during an attack by Haggar, in which he was stabbed by one of her Robeasts and was sent away to the planet Ebb for medical treatment. In the comics, before they became Voltron pilots, Sven was leader of the team; until he took drugs and was forced to give the leadership to Keith. Ebb was attacked and raided by Lotor's forces, and Sven was captured. The prison ship on which he was transferred accidentally crashed on Planet Doom where Sven went into hiding, becoming a hermit within the caves. He eventually encountered Allura's cousin from the Planet Pollux, Princess Romelle, who had been thrown into the Pit of Skulls after she rejected Lotor's advances. During Sven's time on Planet Doom he witnessed Zarkon and Lotor's cruelty to their slaves, which drove him to the point of madness. He recovered thanks to Romelle's emotional support and helped her escape Doom. Sven was later reassigned to the planet Pollux with Romelle and her brother Prince Bandor. Sven eventually became romantically interested in Romelle, although he was reluctant to pursue his romantic feelings because he felt he was not able to clearly express them to her. Sven is always very quiet and reserved, and speaks only when he has something important to say. Although Sven no longer pilots the Blue Lion on a regular basis after Episode 6, he (his twin brother in the Japanese version) continued to be featured as a pilot for the Voltron Force in the opening credits of the series. In the comics, it is revealed that Sven was leader of the team; until he step down because of the drug use and recommended Keith to take his place.

In the Devil's Due comic series, Sven is a mysterious former member of an elite Navy squad.

==== Cadets ====
The three cadets are recruited by the Voltron Force to help battle evil when Lotor returns. The three cadets have a hyperactive nature and irrating egos at first, causing them to be burdens to the original pilots, but they gradually mature during their training. They needed to learn navigation, hand-to-hand combat, tactical combat, strategies, science, and trusting each other. The three cadets tended to work by themselves and think individually, but they begin to learn by working together, they can be able to piloting the Lions.

- Daniel (voiced by Vincent Tong): Exclusive to Voltron Force, he is one of three new cadets for the Voltron Force. Of Asian descent, he and Vince were once cadets for the Galaxy Alliance, but were selected to be cadets for the Voltron Force due to their piloting skills. He also has a liking for going fast. This is evident by his VoltCom powers, which he can use to accelerate Voltron. Daniel's mind was once trapped within Voltron, forcing Vince to head into Voltron to rescue him. Because of this event, Daniel and Vince share a telepathic bond and are able to share VoltCom powers. However, Daniel also developed a Haggarium infection because of this, leading to increased rage and terrible visions. Due to his Haggarium infection, Daniel was able to see into the mind of Lotor, using this ability to lead Voltron in combat to defeat him once and for all, curing the infection. Because of this display of leadership, Keith temporarily steps down as Black Lion pilot to Daniel in order to become King of Arus.
- Vince (voiced by Doron Bell Jr.): Exclusive to Voltron Force, he is one of three new cadets for the Voltron Force. Of African descent, he and Daniel were once cadets for the Galaxy Alliance, but were selected to be cadets for the Voltron Force due to their piloting skills. He also has impressive technical skills which helps Pidge out a lot and appears to have some kind of power that links him to Voltron. The Voltron lions have programming that enables them to use Vince's power as a "Key" to allow Voltron to accomplish special functions when the situation calls for it, particularly to make new formations of Voltron with new powers by reconfiguring itself with a different lion to form the main body while having the black lion form a limb. After Vince rescued Daniel's consciousness from within Voltron, the two are able to communicate telepathically and share VoltCom powers. Eventually, Pidge hands over officially piloting the Green Lion to Vince to remain in constant control of the castle's defenses.
- Larmina (voiced by Shannon Chan-Kent): Exclusive to Voltron Force, she is one of three new cadets for the Voltron Force. She is very skilled in hand-to-hand combat and is Allura's niece. Larmina does not always think things through and is unskilled at piloting. Larmina is often teasing Daniel with insults. This may be a result of her hiding her crush on him as it is depicted at the ending of the episode Predator Robeast she had snapped various pictures of him and flirts. In various other episodes it shows them bonding, getting closer, and flirting. Larmina officially takes over piloting the Blue Lion after Allura resigns to be queen.

=== Vehicle Team Voltron (Rugger Team) ===
==== Air Team (Aki Team) ====
Air Team uniforms are dark blue, yellow, and white.

- Jeff (Aki Manabu) (voiced by Neil Ross): The leader of the entire Vehicle Force and commander of the Air Team, Jeff is head-strong, occasionally quick-tempered, yet still a great fighter and a very capable leader, even if he does not always follow the rules. Jeff pilots the Command Jet Explorer (#1), which becomes the head of Voltron. In Fleet of Doom, it is revealed that Jeff and Keith had a friendly rivalry in their academy days.
- Rocky (Kai Shinobu) (voiced by Lennie Weinrib): Italian-accented member of the Air Team who loves to eat. He pilots the Strato Weapons Module (#2), which forms the upper body of Voltron. Rocky was a sparring partner of Hunk in their academy days.
- Wolo (Shota Kreutz): An alien, blue-skinned member of the Air Team. Wolo is quiet and introspective and is prone to daydreaming. He pilots the Advanced Recon Helicopter (#3), which becomes the right upper arm of Voltron.
- Chip (Yasuo Mutsu) (voiced by Neil Ross in the 1980s series, Gabe Khouth in the 2011 series): Member of the Air Team, and the youngest member of the Vehicle Voltron Force. Chip is Pidge's twin brother. Although not often prominently featured except in one episode, Chip can be described as the brains of the Vehicle Force, much like Pidge is to the Lion Force. He pilots the Advanced Recon Helicopter (#4), which becomes the left upper arm of Voltron.
- Ginger (Patty Ellington) (voiced by B.J. Ward): Member of the Air Team. She is a brave, strong-willed pilot, at one point electing to enter a battle despite having a severe concussion. Ginger fights in honor of her family, who died in an accident when she was young. She pilots the Falcon Jet Fighter (#5), which forms the chest plate of Voltron.

==== Sea Team (Keats Team) ====
Sea Team uniforms are navy blue and aqua.

- Krik (Miranda Keats) (voiced by Michael Bell): Hailing from an unnamed oceanic planet, Krik is the leader of the Sea Team. He has clairvoyant powers that tells him when something bad has happened. He is the pilot of the Communications Module (#6), which becomes the torso mid-riff section of Voltron.
- Lisa (Haruka Kaga) (voiced by B.J. Ward): Kind and compassionate member of the Sea Team, Lisa is wise beyond her years. She is very knowledgeable of ancient cultures, and always seems to know the right thing to say to others. She is in an undefined relationship with Jeff. Lisa pilots the Space Prober (#7), which becomes the right thigh of Voltron.
- Tangor (Saluka Katz) One of the members of the Vehicle Voltron Force who is usually treated as an underused background character. Tangor pilots the Space Prober (#8), which forms the left thigh of Voltron.
- Shannon (Tatsuo Izumo) (voiced by Michael Bell): Irish-accented member of the Sea Team. Like Ginger, he too fights for a noble cause, as his brother is a prisoner of the Drule Empire on Planet Doom. Blunt and opinionated, Shannon is noticeably more cynical and less optimistic than his teammates. He pilots the Multi-Wheeled Explorer (#9), which becomes the right lower leg of Voltron.
- Zandee (Barros Kalateja): Another member of the Vehicle Voltron Force who is usually treated as a barely used background character. Zandee pilots the Multi-Wheeled Explorer (#10), which becomes the left lower leg of Voltron.

==== Land Team (Walter Team) ====
Land Team uniforms are red and white.

- Cliff (Walter Jack) (voiced by Lennie Weinrib): Cliff is the leader of the Land Team. He has an Australian accent, and tends to have a wry sense of humor. Cliff is generally laid-back in nature, but is not afraid to confront others or voice his opinion when necessary. He pilots the Jet Radar Station (#11), which forms the lower torso/hips of Voltron. It is later revealed that Lance and Wolo once yanked Cliff into a pool as a way of welcoming him to the academy.
- Cinda (Moya Kirigas) (voiced by B.J. Ward): Member of the Land Team. Like Lisa, she too is kind and compassionate. Cinda is athletic, at one point able to easily scale an escarpment. She comes from the same water planet as Krik and exhibits some of his clairvoyant traits. She pilots the Rotating Personnel Carrier (#12), which forms the right forearm and hand of Voltron.
- Modok (Mack Chukker) (voiced by Michael Bell): Large member of the Land Team, who can best be described as a "gentle giant." However he can be reckless at times, not always following protocol. Modok pilots the Armored Equipment Carrier (#13), which forms the left forearm and hand of Voltron.
- Marvin (Tasuku Izu) (voiced by Michael Bell): Member of the Land Team, Marvin is often seen together with his good friend Hutch, either playing cards or brawling with him. Marvin typically is the team's source of comic-relief. He pilots the All-Terrain Space Vehicle (#14), which forms the right foot of Voltron.
- Hutch (Kazuto Nagato) (voiced by Peter Cullen): Member of the Land Team, Hutch is often seen together with his good friend Marvin, either playing cards or brawling with him. Hutch is a regular tough guy, always looking for a good fight. He pilots the All-Terrain Space Vehicle (#15), which forms the left foot of Voltron.

=== Mecha ===
==== Lion Voltron (Golion) ====
A sentient robot created by King Alfor on Arus to fight against the armies of Planet Doom. In the first-season finale of The Third Dimension, Voltron was destroyed, but recreated in the beginning of the second season, and would go on to be reconfigured into Stealth Voltron whenever he passed into another dimension.

In Voltron Force, Vince's powers allow Voltron to reconfigure with a different lion to form the main body while the Black Lion becomes a limb. Additionally, Voltron can use Daniel's VoltCom powers to boost the speed of the lions, his formation sequence and himself. With Larmina's VoltCom powers, Voltron gains improved hand-to-hand combat skills and a Blazing Katana which he wields alongside his Blazing Sword.

In Legendary Defender, Voltron was the ultimate weapon in the universe created by the inhabitants of Altea and Daibazaal but was scattered across the universe on Alfor's order to keep it out of the hands of the Galra Empire. The Black Lion remained inside the Castle of Lions, inaccessible unless the other four were recovered, while the other four were hidden on various planets, with the Blue Lion ending up on Earth. The Red Lion was later found and captured by the Galrans, but rescued by Keith after he bonded with it. These versions of the Voltron Lions will only bond with particular pilots, with the Red Lion notably refusing to bond with Keith until he had proven himself. In this version it was Allura herself who created Voltron, and her life force is tied to the giant robot and its Lion components all the while her father, Alfor created the Black Lion. Each Lion has the ability to fire laser blasts, and each provides a unique weapon to the united Voltron form that is unlocked by each Paladin's use of their Bayard; a massive sword can also be formed by combining all of the Bayards except the black one. When the Black Bayard is returned, the sword is revealed to take on the form of the Blazing Sword.

- Black Lion (Kurojishi): Piloted by Keith in the original series, the Black Lion forms the main body of Voltron. Later piloted by Allura in two episodes before being piloted by Daniel in Voltron Force. In Legendary Defender it is piloted by Shiro, having originally been piloted by Zarkon prior to his corruption, and is also briefly piloted by Keith. Unlike the other Lions, the Black Lion did not have a "closed" hangar. Throughout the series, the Black Lion's hangar is located on the large tower fronting the castle, which was previously occupied by a winged lion statue which hid it. When the Black Lion was first activated, this statue crumbled apart to reveal it, and the Black Lion folded its seldom-used wings. Among its various weapons are a Plasma Blaster, Cross Beam, Shoulder Cannon, Mouth Dagger, and a full array of Mk.1 Fang Missiles. In Voltron: The Third Dimension, it is shown that the winged lion statue literally morphs into the Black Lion when the lion is launched. In Voltron Force, Black Lion gains a "Tail Shock" and its hangar is the central tower of the castle, which opens to deploy the Black Lion. Additionally, the "default" configuration of Voltron is also known as Black Center. In all media, when the Black Lion forms the body of Voltron, his weapon is the Blazing Sword. In Legendary Defender the Black Lion was created from a comet that crashlanded on Emperor Zarkon's home planet.
- Red Lion (Akajishi): Piloted by Lance, the Red Lion forms the right arm of Voltron. Later piloted by Princess Allura in one episode since Lance was using the Blue Lion to find the cure for the deadly flowers. Piloted by Keith in Legendary Defender. The Red Lion's hangar is located inside a volcano near the castle. Among its weapons are Dual Shoulder Triple Barrel Mortars, Lava Cannon, Mk.1 Fang Missiles, and a Curved Mouth Dagger. In Voltron Force, Red Lion gains a "Sub-Infrared Thermographic Optics", "Precision Laser" and can form the body of Voltron (known as Red Center) which uses the "Magma Pistols". In Red Center configuration, the Black Lion is Voltron's right arm.
- Green Lion (Midonjishi): Piloted by Pidge, the Green Lion forms the left arm of Voltron. Piloted by Keith in its first launch before the Black Lion was recovered, and has now been passed down to Vince in Voltron Force. The Green Lion's hangar is located in a forest near the castle. Among its weapons are Dual Shoulder Turret Guns, Mouth Dagger, and Mk.1 Fang Missiles. In Voltron Force, Green Lion gains a "3D Digital-Camouflage" stealth package, "Sonic Blaster", "Shuriken Tail",+kl "Boomerang Blade" and can form the body of Voltron (known as Green Center) which gives Voltron a Tech Ninja look with a "Boomerang Shield". In Green Center configuration, the Black Lion is Voltron's left arm. In Legendary Defender, both Pidge and Green Lion are reimagined as female.
- Blue Lion (Aojishi): Originally piloted by Sven until Allura became its official pilot; later passed down to Larmina in Voltron Force. Piloted by Lance in Legendary Defender. The Blue Lion forms the right leg of Voltron. Piloted in one episode each by Keith, Coran, and Nanny together, and a replacement pilot (who turned out to be an agent of Zarkon). Piloted once by Lance when he went off to a distant planet to find the cure by which to heal the Princess. Lance piloted the Blue Lion because the planet had a special magnetic field that only the Blue Lion could overcome. The Blue Lion's hangar is located underneath the moat that surrounds the castle. Among its weapons are Dual Shoulder Blockbuster Turrets, Mk.1 Fang Missiles, Sidewinder Claw Torpedoes, and a Holy Mouth Dagger. In Voltron Force, Blue Lion gains a "Freeze Ray" and can form the body of Voltron (known as Blue Center) which uses the "Titanic Trident", a double-ended trident. In Blue Center configuration, the Blue Lion is Voltron's right leg. It is also shown to perform better underwater than the other lions, similar to the way black lion appears to fly faster than the other lions.
- Yellow Lion (Kijishi): Piloted by Hunk, the Yellow Lion forms the left leg of Voltron. The Yellow Lion's hangar is located inside a lion-shaped cave located in a desert near the castle. Among its weapons are its Plasma Flash Cannon, Radial Shogun Shoulder Blasters, Mk.1 Fang Missiles, and a Mouth Dagger. In Voltron: The Third Dimension, its hangar was redesigned to resemble a sphinx-like form instead of an ordinary cave. In Voltron Force, Yellow Lion gains a "Vibration Cannon", "Switchblade Claw Hammer", and a "Demolition Tail" as well as a prominent underbite which helps serve as a land plower and can form the body of Voltron (known as Yellow Center) which uses the "Wrecking Maces" twin flails. Voltron Yellow Center has the unique ability to deploy solar cell wings and recharge the robot when he's away from Planet Arus. In Yellow Center configuration, the Black Lion is Voltron's left leg. When Yellow Center is active, the background music is played in a more rock-inspired style, mirroring Hunk's personality.

==== Vehicle Voltron (Dairugger) ====
In the Devil's Due comic series, Vehicle Voltron was created by the Galaxy Garrison after abducting Voltron from Arus and reverse-engineering it under orders from a Drule spy. The machine was named "V-15" within the comics, and was first deployed after Voltron to recapture him until they received new orders to support him. Among its weapons are the Solar Combat Spears, Ray Beam Whip, Electro-thermal Blast, Eye Beams, Wing Beam, Solar Wind Blast, and the Spinning Laser Blades which are used as precursor to the Blazing Sword. Unlike the animated series, which depicted the two Voltron Forces as being family members, as with Chip and Pidge, or longstanding friends, the Devil's Due comic showed Keith and Jeff as having an antagonistic relationship with one another due to Lion Voltron's accidental "sneak attack" on Vehicle Voltron during the robots' first battle together.

- Strato Fighter (Kurugger): Piloted by the Air Team.
  - Command Jet Explorer 1 (Rugger #1): Piloted by Jeff. Forms the head.
  - Strato Weapons Module 2 (Rugger #2): Piloted by Rocky. Forms the upper torso.
  - Advanced Recon Helicopter 3 (Rugger #3) (the red one): Piloted by Wolo. Forms the right upper arm.
  - Advanced Recon Helicopter 4 (Rugger #4) (the blue one): Piloted by Chip. Forms the left upper arm.
  - Falcon Jet Fighter 5 (Rugger #5): Piloted by Ginger. Forms the chest plate.
- Aqua Fighter (Kairugger): Piloted by the Sea Team.
  - Communications Module 6 (Rugger #6): Piloted by Krik. Forms the Torso midriff.
  - Space Prober 7 (Rugger #7) (the red one): Piloted by Lisa. Forms the right thigh.
  - Space Prober 8 (Rugger #8) (the blue one): Piloted by Tangor. Forms the left thigh.
  - Multi-Wheeled Explorer 9 (Rugger #9): Piloted by Shannon. Forms the right lower leg.
  - Multi-Wheeled Explorer 10 (Rugger #10): Piloted by Zandee. Forms the left lower leg.
- Turbo-Terrain Fighter (Rikurugger): Piloted by the Land Team.
  - Jet Radar Station 11 (Rugger #11): Piloted by Cliff. Forms the hips.
  - Rotating Personnel Carrier 12 (Rugger #14): Piloted by Cinda. Forms the right forearm.
  - Armored Equipment Carrier 13 (Rugger #13): Piloted by Modoch. Forms the left forearm.
  - All-Terrain Space Vehicle 14 (Rugger #14) (the yellow one): Piloted by Marvin. Forms the right foot.
  - All-Terrain Space Vehicle 15 (Rugger #15) (the black one): Piloted by Hutch. Forms the left foot.

==== Other mechas ====
- Space Mouse Fighter (Mouse Mech): Piloted by the Space Mice. It has two modes – land and flight. It can deploy fire, water, darts and bombs.
- Castle of Lions (Castle Gradam): The Lion Voltron Force's base of operations and their home, which near the finale can transform into a Flying Fortress, or Nova Class Cruiser, piloted by Coran. Armed with missiles, cannons and heat rays.
- Stellar Ship Explorer (Rugger Guard): Mothership of the Voltron Vehicle Team, piloted by Commander Hawkins.
- Awesometron: A humanoid robot formed from Daniel's motorcycle, Vince's tank, and Larmina's combat vehicle, piloted by the Voltron cadets.

=== Allies ===
==== Voltron Lion Force ====
- Chief Kalon: Exclusive to Voltron Force, Kalon is an ancient lion protector or Lion Rider of Planet Ariel. He and his lion riders protect the Krelshi, ghostly beasts that are an essential part of Ariel's "harmonious spiritual aura". After Voltron Force helps him maintain order with the Krelshi, he is in their debt. During Keith's plan to rescue political prisoners from "The Void", he is surprised when he finds Kalon in the "Black Hole" cell with him and plans to make his escape. In the final battle with Sky Marshall Wade, Kalon and his lion riders help out in the fight destroying Wade's robots in the process and takes Wade's pet lion into custody wondering why he was raised in such an evil way.
- Coran Hieronymus Wimbleton Smythe (Strategist Raible) (voiced by Peter Cullen in the 1980s series, Michael Bell in the 1990s series, Ron Halder in the 2011 series, and Rhys Darby in the 2016 reboot series): Coran is Allura's royal advisor, in charge of the Castle Control, current Galaxy Alliance Ambassador from Arus and President of the Galaxy Garrison Council. He also advises the Voltron Force, and is very wise, though he can be very overprotective and opinionated at times. In Legendary Defender, Coran is Princess Allura's advisor and the last known surviving male Altean following the destruction of their home solar system. Coran is noted for being somewhat foppish, goofy, and very much a traditionalist.
- Princess Farla (Aimee): Farla is the princess of Planet Lyra who gives Lance the seeds to the famed "Rose of Lyra" so that he can save the people on Planet Arus from the evil flowers sent by Haggar.
- King Alfor (King Raimon) (voiced by Peter Cullen in the 1980s series, Tim Curry in the 1990s series, Sam Vincent in the 2011 series, Keith Ferguson in the 2016 series): King Alfor is Allura's deceased father and the previous ruler of planet Altea. Years ago, Alfor was killed in battle against King Zarkon and buried beneath the Castle of Lions. However, Alfor returned in a ghostly form to advise his daughter Allura. In Legendary Defender, he scattered the Voltron Lions across the known universe before uploading his consciousness into a computer in the Castle of Lions, which allows him to continue advising his daughter. This AI was later destroyed after it was corrupted by energy from a Galra energy crystal.
- Manset (voiced by Garry Chalk): Exclusive to Voltron Force, Manset is a crustacean-like alien smuggler and friend of Keith who was once a political prisoner of the Den Resistance imprisoned in "The Void", a floating prison operated by Sky Marshall Wade. He was broken out of prison by Keith and escaped into obscurity, not to be heard from again until he is seen helping out with the relief effort by importing food and supplies for Planet Ebb. He also provided backup for the Voltron Force by supplying one of his airships filled with Krelshi, ancient lion riders in the final battle with Wade. Manset has a few ideas how to get Voltron back home, and gives Voltron Force the "friends and family" discount with the shipping.
- Nanny (Senior Court Lady Hys) (voiced by B.J. Ward): Nanny is Allura's over-protective caregiver, who always wants to make all of Allura's decisions for her. Like Coran, Nanny fusses over the Princess and is bent on keeping her away from all harm. In Voltron Force, she cares for Sven's infant son while he is in self-exile on Crydor. In Go-Lion, she was killed during an attack on the castle.
- Prince Bandor (Prince Alor) (voiced by Neil Ross): Co-ruler of planet Pollux, along with his older sister, Princess Romelle. Became heir apparent after the death of his older brother.
- Princess Romelle (Princess Amue) (voiced by B.J. Ward): Princess Romelle is Allura's cousin, who lives on the planet Pollux, where she co-rules with her brother, Prince Bandor. She is a dead-ringer for Princess Allura, in terms of physical appearance although Romelle's voice is lower than Allura's. Romelle was once a slave of Lotor, until Sven came to her rescue; together they fight for her people against the Drule Empire. She and Sven become engaged and live "happily ever after" on Pollux.
- Queen Ariella: First Queen of Planet Arus in The Third Dimension. She first came to Arus from another planet and was found and raised by the five lions before they became Robot lions. It was said they she constructed the Castle of Lions. Now deceased, she appears to Allura as a spirit, much like her father does, and reveals to Allura a way to recreate the five Lions after they are destroyed. She explains that the five lions can never be permanently destroyed, as their spirits will always be with Arus.
- Space Mice (Platt-Chuchule and others): The Space Mice are a group of five pastel-colored mice displaying a human-like level of intelligence, who were Princess Allura's friends as a child. Toward the end of the Lion Force Voltron series, the Space Mice wear orange Voltron Force uniforms and pilot a machine called the Mouse Plane, which can transform into a Mouse Voltron. In the Devil's Due comic series, the Space Mice are robots constructed for Princess Allura by her father. The robotic Space Mice are continued into Voltron Force; they returned as organic beings in Legendary Defender, where they were inside Allura's stasis chamber with her for 10,000 years and developed a mental connection to her.

==== S.S. Explorer crew ====
- Commander Hawkins (Shinji Ise): (voiced by Peter Cullen): Commander of the S.S. Explorer, it is Commander Hawkins who gives all the orders to the Vehicle Voltron Force. Firm and hard working, Hawkins is determined to make peace with the Drule Empire, despite how many times they attempt to backstab him in the process. In the Devil's Due comic series, Hawkins was the one who gathered Keith and his crew together in order to have them find Voltron for their fight against the Drules.
- Captain Newley (Dick Asimov) (voiced by Lennie Weinrib): Captain of the S.S. Explorer, and good friend to Commander Hawkins. Midway through the series, he gets transferred back to Galaxy Garrison on Earth, but that does not stop his fight against the Drules.
- Sparks (voiced by Jack Angel): Usually seen on the bridge with Hawkins and Newley.
- Professor Page (Doctor Search) (voiced by Jack Angel): The S.S. Explorer's chief scientist and acting physician, he can tell all about a planet's history and even its cultures simply by examining a mere sample or artifact.
- Debbie (voiced by BJ Ward): A scientist sometimes seen with Professor Page.
- Hardware: A small green robot aboard the S.S. Explorer, who according to Ginger, is the only one who likes it when the Vehicle Voltron Force cannot go out on a mission.

=== Galaxy Garrison ===
The government within the Voltron series. While some of its members help the Voltron teams, others have their own agenda.

- Space Marshal Graham (High Commander Wasaka) (voiced by Jack Angel): Supreme commander of the Galaxy Alliance. Along with Commander Steele, he is usually conducting meetings discussing current situations involving the ongoing conflict with the Drule Empire.
- Commander Steele (Supreme Commander Dewa) (voiced by Neil Ross): High-ranking official of the Galaxy Alliance. Along with Space Marshal Graham, he is usually conducting meetings discussing current situations involving the war with the Drule Empire. He takes a more active role in the conflict towards the end of the series.
- Defense Minister:
- Captain Keyo (Captain Kehl) (voiced by Michael Bell): Captain of the backup fleet, Keyo is of the same race as Wolo and Tangor. Against orders not to interfere, the Voltron Force attempts to defend Kio's fleet against an ambush from a Drule fleet that pretended to be a peace envoy. Keyo orders the Voltron Force to obey orders and return to the Explorer. Keyo and his crew sacrifice themselves to prevent a political incident. Along with Yurak, Keyo is the only other named character in Voltron whose death is retained without editing or dialogue disclaimers.
- Colonel Cross (voiced by Neil Ross):
- Amalgamus (voiced by Neil Ross): A cyborg-like liaison to the Voltron Lion Force in Third Dimension. He is an amalgam of all 900 planets of the Galaxy Alliance and the highest-ranked official of Galaxy Garrison. He at first was reluctant to have Voltron reactivated, believing diplomacy could be used to make peace with Lotor. But over time, he comes to accept Voltron as a necessary ally. He is also the only one who fully trusts Zarkon, which is also his greatest weakness as he was unknowingly reprogrammed by Zarkon to distrust Voltron Force. Towards the end of the series, he was retaken by the Voltron Force and restored to his original Voltron allied programming.

=== Drule Empire (Galveston) ===
The Drule Empire are the main enemies of the Voltron Lion and Vehicle Teams, ruled by Emperor Zeppo. They are at war with the Galaxy Alliance. Most of them are humanoids with light purple skin and red eyes. Among many planets in the empire are Drule, Doom, etc.

- Emperor Zeppo (Emperor Corsair): (voiced by Michael Bell): Through most of the series, all we ever see of Zeppo is a portrait of him adorning every Drule command ship. It is not until much later that he is introduced in the flesh, attending meetings of the Drule Supreme Council. No other Drule holds higher royal rank than the Emperor. When the liberation of planet Drule finally came, Zeppo quietly stood by as Hazar personally overthrew his rule. Hazar thus immediately became Drule's rightful emperor, though he then decreed that their world would no longer have any Emperors, but that leaders would from then on be elected. Zeppo and Throk proceeded to quietly flee the dying planet. Shortly after the inevitable destruction of planet Drule, the liberated citizens were moved to a new planet by the Galaxy Alliance. Zeppo and his loyalists began rebuilding their empire on planet Deeva planning to rebuild their army and become a galactic power once again. However it is never revealed if they were successful or not.

=== Planet Doom/Galra Empire ===
The villains of the Lion Voltron series, ruled by King Zarkon in the Denubian galaxy. In the Devil's Due comic series, Planet Doom is the center of the Drule Empire as the "Kingdom of Night".

- Prince Lotor (Prince Sincline)/Spider Lotor Robeast (voiced by Lennie Weinrib in the 80s series, Tim Curry in the 90s series, and Mark Hildreth in the 2011 series): Lotor is both the main antagonist and the sworn enemy of the Voltron Lion Force. He is Zarkon's son and prince of Planet Doom, though he would plot to overthrow his father in order to rule Planet Doom in his place with Princess Allura by his side, to whom he has developed a strong and obsessive attraction and because of this he rejects other potential suitresses that would be his queen, which is one of the reasons that leads to his downfall. So powerful are his feelings that he is unable to even destroy a holographic image of Allura. Lotor is a very sly, intelligent, smooth and powerful individual, who exudes force and emanates what seems to be pure evil, except when Allura is around. In the Devil's Due comic series, Lotor met Allura while they were children during Zarkon's invasion of Arus and he follows a warrior's code of honor while seeing all non-Drule life forms as inferior. In Voltron: The Third Dimension, Lotor was mortally wounded in the final battle, and he was converted into a cyborg after he was placed in prison. However, he escaped and perpetrated his revenge on the heroes, though he still has feelings for Allura. In Voltron Force, succeeding in becoming king, Lotor was killed off in the final battle. However, he is revived years later by his body being infused with Haggarium with side effects that enable him to fight Voltron despite the size difference. In "GoLion", Sven's twin brother kills him at the end of the series at the cost of his own life.
- King Zarkon (Emperor Daibazaal) (voiced by Jack Angel in the 80s series and Kevin Michael Richardson in the 90s series): The secondary antagonist of the Voltron Lion Force, King Zarkon of the Planet Doom is one of the rulers of the Drule Empire, though by no means the absolute ruler (who is Emperor Zeppo), and pretty much operates on his own. He is constantly using others as scapegoats for his own failures, including his son, Lotor. Zarkon resurfaces in Voltron: The Third Dimension, having redeemed himself prior to his final defeat, and became a member of the Galaxy Alliance. However, Zarkon's redemption was really a ruse and he turned out to be the true mastermind behind Lotor in a bid to take over the galaxy.
- Queen Merla (voiced by Tress MacNeille): A villainess exclusive to the U.S. version and the Devil's Due comic, serving as Lotor's bride-to-be as Zarkon's attempt to reap the political benefits of their union. Known for having a StratoVulture on her shoulder, and pilots a Star Cutter ship. She has limited telepathic abilities that allow her to read minds. She eventually declared to peacefully ally herself with the Galaxy Alliance, befriending the Voltron Lion Force.
- Witch Haggar (Yoba Honerva) (voiced by B.J. Ward): Haggar the witch is the one responsible for creating all of the Robeasts Zarkon uses. She is notorious for using her dark magic to cast hypnotizing spells over people. Though she was once good and beautiful, she is now evil and hideous. It was Haggar who was responsible for originally splitting Voltron into five components in the American version. In Voltron: The Third Dimension, Haggar went into hiding after the final battle. But after Lotor escaped from prison, she rejoined Lotor in his schemes to destroy the Voltron Force and conquer the galaxy. In the Devil's Due comic series, Haggar had no part in Voltron's origin story, replaced by an ancestor of Zarkon's, though she is well versed in it. She also attempts to brainwash Sven under Merla's wishes. In Golion Honerva is secretly Daibazaal's mother and Sincline's grandmother, though she despises Sincline. She helped the Golions at the end; however, Sincline killed her for it.
- Devil Cat Coba (Jaga): Haggar's blue cat and enemy of the Space Mice.
- Commander Yurak (Commander Sadak)/Yurak Robeast (Great Sadak): (voiced by Jack Angel in the 80s series, Jake Eberle in Legendary Defender): Commander of the Doom Forces. Due to his numerous defeats by Voltron, he is sentenced to death (exile in the Voltron dub) He is transformed into a gigantic Robeast fighter in hopes of redeeming himself. However, he is killed by Voltron.
- Mogor (Commander Gobra) (voiced by Jack Angel): Took Yurak's place as Prince Lotor's second-in-command. Sometimes his rank is either Commander or Captain, and was called Morgil in the episode "Lotor's New Hitman." A highly decorated veteran in Zarkon's army, he is first and foremost a soldier. Said to be killed by Lotor in an ensuing power struggle.
- Karp (Reggar) (voiced by Peter Cullen): A cocky, egotistical ace pilot who is recruited by Lotor and Haggar. Although given a Robeast to pilot, he retains his smug attitude by demanding that the Robeast be painted red to match his trademark color. He wreaks considerable havoc on Arus and several other planets. He is made Governor General much to the annoyance of Mogor who disliked Karp's superior attitude. Karp was eventually defeated by Voltron; one of the few enemies that Voltron defeated by chance. Mogor was not disappointed that Karp had such a short career as Governor General. In the American Voltron, as was usual, Karp's death was covered by dialogue; in this case Lotor saying "Maybe he'll land safely and come again." Lotor's voiceover continues over what is actually a sunrise; however, the added sound effect suggests an explosion on the planet. Lotor states that Karp did not make a very good landing and would probably be in no condition to fly for a long time.
- Garrett (Saint) (voiced by Jack Angel): An X4-11 clone of Coran's son.
- Commander Cossack (voiced by Jack Angel): A replacement for Mogor, he was generally ineffective against Voltron, though like Yurak, he often went into battle throwing everything he could think of against the robot, including various Robeasts that were given to him by Haggar for the purpose of battling Voltron. He calls himself "Cossack the Terrible".
- Queequeg and Lafitte (voiced by Billy West and Tress MacNeille): Exclusive to Voltron: The Third Dimension, these two space pirates were drafted by Lotor for menial work.
- Igor (voiced by Clancy Brown): A robotic figure who was commander of Lotor's army in Voltron: The Third Dimension. Igor was among Zarkon and Lotor's forces of Doom who were defeated by the Voltron Force.
- Maahox (voiced by Ron Halder): Exclusive to Voltron Force, he is a scientist from the planet Calum with knowledge of the occult and genetic manipulation before he was sent into exile. He aids Kala in reviving Lotor, only to betray her and turn her into the first new generation of Robeasts while becoming Lotor's right-hand man. He is later revealed to have his own ambitions for universal domination, using Lotor as a pawn to get what he wants.
- Commander Kala/Kala Spider Robeast/Kala Spider-Lion Robeast (voiced by Tabitha St. Germain): Exclusive to Voltron Force, a Drule commander infamous for her military intellect and unequaled blood lust. She recruits Maahox to resurrect Lotor, only to be betrayed by the scientist and fused with an alien arachnid to become the first of a new generation of Robeasts. In her new Robeast form, Kala manages to capture Wade's robot lion and merge with it to become a fusion of lion and spider before she is defeated by Voltron and tossed into space. However, it is revealed that Kala's mutated body is able to repair itself even when it is on the brink of utter destruction. By that time, Kala learns that she unintentionally formed a mental link with Wade and eventually absorbed him into her Robeast form. But when Lotor transformed the Kala-Wade Robeast into his new body, the Voltron Force used teamwork to defeat the monster, with only Lotor surviving due to Maahox reviving him yet again.
- Ultra Droids (Black Soldiers): Planet Doom's foot soldiers.
- Dwarflings: Queen Merla's foot soldiers.

=== Drule Supreme Council ===
- Viceroy Throk (Supreme Commander Al Caponero) (voiced by Peter Cullen): Possibly the worst of the worst, Throk is at bitter ends with Mozak and Hazar, and the loyalist supporter of Emperor Zeppo. Throk becomes the main baddie under Zeppo towards the very end of the series, especially during the impending arrival of the Voltron Force on the planet Drule to aid Hazar in liberating the homeworld and overthrowing Zeppo. Later, Throk would join forces with Zarkon in building the universe's most feared space armada, the Fleet of Doom.
- Durax (voiced by Jack Angel):
- Blazak:
- Karsh:

=== Commanders ===
- Marshal Keezor (Luciano) (voiced by Michael Bell): Wicked and crafty member of the Drule Supreme Council. He first arrived personally to give Hazar the news of his demotion, then appeared to take on Hazar's duties of eliminating the Voltron Force. In the Lion Voltron series, it was also Keezor who arranged for Zarkon to be stripped of his powers and to have those powers handed over to Lotor.
- Commander Vargo:
- Commander Flazon:
- Commander Borgam:
- Commander Sendak: See Commander Yurak above.

=== Fleet Commanders ===
- Captain Mongo (Drake) (voiced by Jack Angel): One of the Drule Empire's best officers, and a loyal friend of Hazar. When Hazar began to have a change of heart, Mongo was one of the few Drules who supported him, and he continued to loyally support him, until he eventually went into exile midway through the series. Presumably due to an error, during the first two episodes in which this character appears, he was called Malvor and had a different voice.
- Captain Quark (Commander Rackal) (voiced by Jack Angel): An early opponent of the Explorer and its crew. Persistent, but ultimately ineffective against the Voltron Force. He causes the destruction of an uninhabited planet that the Drules and humans were competing over. Curiously, his death scene is included in the American Voltron release, but the scene was incongruously dubbed over, with Quark saying, "I'll be back," before his ship explodes. A member of the Voltron Force (Wolo) later states, "Quark got away again."
- Captain Rogar:
- Captain Zabar (Gramont) (voiced by Lennie Weinrib): An ambitious Drule commander who sides first with Brak, then with Nerok against Hazar's stand for peaceful cooperation. He hopes to be given rule of Earth after the defeat of the Galaxy Alliance.
- Captain Nerok (Lafitte) (voiced by Michael Bell): Cruel and heavyset Drule officer. A natural-born kiss-up and backstabber, he lives for nothing more than destroying the Galaxy Alliance and making Hazar look like a fool.
- Captain Brak (Barataria) (voiced by Jack Angel): Hazar's earliest opponent of peaceful negotiations with the Galaxy Alliance. Brak attempts to drive a wedge between Hazar and Mongo. Unlike other opponents to Hazar, Brak appears to respect Hazar and hopes to persuade Hazar to consider the needs of the Drule Empire first. In frustration over failing to persuade Hazar, Brak attempts to stage a military coup but he failed and was imprisoned.
- Sandu (Sim): A Drule pilot who is captured by the Explorer crew. In usual form, Commander Hawkins treats the pilot as a guest rather than as a prisoner. However, this upsets Shannon, a member of the Voltron Force Sea Team, whose brother is being held prisoner by the Drules. Upon getting to know Sandu, Shannon realizes that Sandu, despite being on the side of the enemy, is only following orders and is unaware of the evil nature of his masters. Sandu is allowed to return to his ship, but he is shot down by a Drule commander, who believes it is a trick by the humans. In the American version, he crash lands on a planet and although he is badly wounded, he apparently survives.
- Captain Raddick:
- Captain Gorvan:
- Captain Zabore:
- Captain Gorzil:
- Captain Dirka:
- Captain Maldon:
- Captain Bordo:
- Captain Bratso:
- Captain Toxic:
- Captain Twyla (Emma) (voiced by B.J. Ward): A female Drule officer who is captured by the Explorer crew. She is confused by Commander Hawkins's treatment of her as a guest rather than as a prisoner like Sandu had been. Hawkins explains to her that willingness to discuss peace negotiations is not the same as selling out her race. Her final fate is unknown, but Hawkins hoped that she communicated a new alternative to other members of her race.
- Captain Vallen:
- Captain Bardo:
- Captain Danton:
- Captain Garrow:
- Captain Noran:
- Captain Hammew:
- Captain Jemka:
- Captain Shigormo:
- Captain Zutka:
- Captain Laro:
- Captain Holtis:
- Captain Arkul:

=== Drule U.R.F. ===
The Drule Underground Rebel Force was founded by Bakki to liberate their home world's citizens from tyranny.

- Commandant Bakki (voiced by Michael Bell): Founder of the U.R.F., Bakki is a kind-hearted Drule, who hopes to liberate his homeworld's citizens from the tyranny of the Drule rulers.
- Chief Commander Hazar (Galveston High Commander Dorita Teles) (voiced by Jack Angel): High-ranking warlord of the Drule Empire. At the beginning of the series, he was a typical Drule leader bent on galactic conquest. However, midway through the series, he begins to have a change of heart, and becomes more compassionate in his quest; and, like Commander Hawkins, tries time and time again to arrange for peace between the Drule Empire and the Galaxy Alliance. Throughout the series, he has had to put up with demotions, imprisonment, and worst of all; treacherous underlings who repeatedly and deliberately disobey his direct orders of helping bring peace, in favor of attacking the Alliance.
- Dorma (Sirk) (voiced by B.J. Ward): Hazar's kindhearted sister, who appears towards the end of the series. When she is kidnapped by the Drule U.R.F. (Underground Rebel Force), she agrees to join in their fight for peace and freedom on planet Drule.
- Chancellor Mozak (Internal Commissioner Socrat Tes): Hazar and Dorma's father, and kindhearted member of the Drule Supreme Council, he wishes nothing more than for peace and freedom on planet Drule. He often clashes in his views with Viceroy Throk.
- Salazar:

=== Others ===
- Menak:
- Supro:
- Lt. Antor:
- Branon:
- Coffin Rockets: Used to bring Robeasts from Planet Doom.
- Drule Prisoner Ships: Used to carry slaves to Planet Doom.
- Drule Fighters: A robotic space fleet of the Drules.
- Drule Explorer Ship:
- Drule Tanks:
- Stingers:
- Purple Raiders:
- Super Raiders:
- Drule Haggarium Tanker: Holds an entire fleet of Drule Tanks.
- Drule Command Tank:
- Drule Escape Pods:

=== Robeasts (Deathblack/Mechblack Beastmen-Combat/Battle Machines) ===
Monsters used by members of the Drule Empire and often sent to fight the two Voltrons of the Galaxy Alliance.

==== Planet Doom Robeasts (Wave 1) ====
The Robeasts sent from planet Doom to battle the Lion Force, reared in gladiatorial combat, are humanoid monsters created through a combination of superscience and Haggar's magic, usually from prisoners of war though some of them are simply giant robots piloted by Doom soldiers.

- Battle Batbeast (Prototype) (3–4):
- Cyclops (Deathhell) (5): A one-eyed Robeast with cannons on its pectoral muscles. It used by Commander Yurak in his attack on Arus. A redesigned version of Cyclops later appeared in Voltron Force where it no longer sported the cannons
- Exospike Robeast (Galcia) (6): A Robeast that was used to injure Sven.
- Blue Fiend (Mogyula) (7):
- Prince Bokar of Senak/Bokar Snake Robeast (Bambara) (8): A cobra Robeast that posed as Prince Bokar of Senak.
- Clawbeast/Poison Bugblade (Gagal) (9): A one-eyed Robeast created from Twila's brother who made a deal with Zarkon.
- Loathsome Lion (Lian) (10): A Robeast that disguised himself as a White Lion.
- Demon Goatbeast (Bufaloon) (11): A goat-like Robeast. Its coming is symbolized by red rain and thunderbolts.
- Twin Devil Robeasts: Beyel and Zebub (Twin Titan) (12): Two Robeasts used during King Zarkon's birthday on Planet Nemon.
- Heavy Deathsail (Infiltrator) (13):
- TrunkTank Robeast (Mammoth) (16):
- Prince Avok Robeast (Samson) (17): Prince Avok is the older brother of Princess Romelle and Prince Bandor who is turned into a Robeast.
- Drule Evilroots (Treeder) (18):
- Armordillo (Kame Gata War Ship) (19):
- Terrordactyl (Batolda) (20): A Robeast that was used during an attack on Balto.
- Bluhdsucker (Killwrestler) (21):
- Hammerhead Beetle (Deathbeetle) (22):
- Lion Tamer (Kauman) (23): A Robeast that was trained for fighting the Robot Lions.
- Extendor Sphinx (Catgun) (24):
- Centipede Express Robeast (Galra Galactic Train) (25): A transportation vehicle that doubled as a Robeast.
- Invisible Arms (Bullbar) (26): Also known as Number 50.
- Medusa Anga (Gorgon) (27): A green Medusa transformed by Haggar who Pidge befriended. In Robeast form, Medusa Anga can shoot beams from her eye that turns anything to stone.
- Snakehead Robeast (Eliminator) (27):
- Extinction Engine (Devil Burn) (29):
- Deltabeast (Lambda) (31):
- Omegabeast (Deltabeast Mk.2) (Gamma) (32):
- Aqua-Starbeast (Omega-Subgar) (33):
- Spiro Charger/Kill-Driller (Delta) (34):
- Neuro Robeast: Death Builder (Pi) (35): A Robeast that takes over an Earth Mover.
- Psycho-Stoutbeast (Deadzone) (36):
- Red Raptor Robeast (Mu Reggar) (37): A Robeast that was given to Karp by Haggar.
- Burst Robeast (Kappa) (38): A Robeast that was used by the Red Beret Robots (Death Commandos).
- Omega Comet (Space Wolf) (39–40):
- Iron-Ripper Crushwheel (39):
- Goliath Bugtank (Nu) (40):
- Iron Maiden/Golden Maiden (Rho) (41):
- Sandmole Monster (Sand) (42): The Robeast form of an innocent Sand Person Allura nicknamed Sandy.
- Gladiatron (Ypsilon) (43):
- Drule Voltron 1 (False GoLion) (44):
- Spidrex (Alpha) (45):
- Scorponaut (Chi Granz) (46):
- Robozero (Zeta) (47):
- Needler (Beta) (48–49): A Robeast. Destroyed by the Pulsar Cannon that Prince Lotor stole.
- King Zarkon Robeast (Garla) (50–51): A Robeast that has King Zarkon in his head.
- Octovore (105):
- Mechabeak Robeast (106):
- Scalestrike (107):
- Demoncrab Robeast (108):
- Deathhornet (109):
- Dinoslasher (110):
- Kingfish Robeast (110): Jungle Woman's father was turned into a fish-like Robeast. He was later restored to normal.
- Direspider Robeast (111):
- Mantaraybeast (112): A Robeast that was disguised as a Masked Man.
- Hypnokiller Robeast (113):
- Hornback (114):
- Roachman Robeast (115):
- Reptoking (116):
- Yellow Belly (117):
- Death Mantis (118):
- Sacbeast (119):
- Clawbull (120):
- Sinsects (121): One used against the Robot Lions and the other was used on its fellow Robeast by Lotor.
- Evil Eagle (122):
- Apex Death (122):
- Megapiranhabot (123):
- Bronze Puma (124):
- Drule Voltron 2 (Fleet of Doom): This evil version of Voltron is made from four robeasts and one of Lotor's Skull Ships. Armed with an Iron Mace, Lazon Rays, Scorch Beams, Iron Claw and the Blazing Scimitar (known as an ultra-weapon and the Blade of Doom). This Voltron's weak point was the skull on its chest.
  - SupernovaClass Drule Skull Ship: Forms the head.
  - Rhino Beast: Forms the legs and lower tower.
  - Scorpio: Forms part of the chest armor as well as the crotch.
  - Stag Beetle: A stag beetle robeast. Forms the back and wings.
  - Armor Beast: An armadillo robeast. Forms the shoulders and arms.

==== Planet Drule Robeasts (Wave 2) ====
In Voltron Force, a new series of Robeasts are produced by infusing apex predators from various planets with Haggarium. The resulting creatures are biomechanical beasts with the Haggarium enabling them to normally weaken Voltron with special abilities augmenting their natural talents.

- Blur Robeast:
- Predator Robeast: A creation of Maahox's, the Predator Robeast is composed of five Robeasts that he send to attack the Voltron Lions in their lairs, and then later combine. Despite the best efforts of the Voltron Force team, the Predator Robeast was able to easily defeat them though Lotor has it recalled out of pride to be the one to land the final blow. Later, Lotor uses the Predator Robeast in a major battle against Voltron, but is defeated by a powered up green center Voltron. The five robeasts are:
  - Minotaur Beast: Forms the head and torso.
  - Snake Beast: Forms the right arm.
  - Wolf Beast: Forms the right leg.
  - Shark Beast: Forms the left leg.
  - Dragon Beast: Forms the left arm and wings.
- Sonic Robeast:
- Castle Doom Robeast: The Castle Doom Robeast was a Robeast created by Maahox from Castle Doom. It was the biggest Robeast the Voltron faced, able to rip Voltron back into the 5 lions. It and Maahox where destroyed with a 5 lion Head attack, and a supercharged Blazing Sword.

==== Drule Robeasts ====
The Drule Robeasts that battle the Explorer and the Vehicle Force are uniformly technology based and mostly piloted by Drule soldiers.

- Crush Crab:
- Titanic Tick:
- Dragonoid Robeast:
- Crush Crab Neo:
- Antropoda Robeast:
- Cannon Mantis:
- Electrobeast:
- Mutant Sphere Robeast:
- Spy Crawler:
- Robeast #9:
- Dread Sinistar:
- Necro-Thresher Robeast:
- Cyberbug Robeast:
- Planet Smasher:
- Hades Orb Robeast:
- Nightshade Berzerker:
- Heavy Blazersect Robeast:
- Barracudax:
- Arachno-Binder Beast:
- Dynamobot:
- Rocket Sniper Robeast:
- Wolf-Beetle Robeast:
- Steel Spacebug Battler:
- Cyclops Revolution Robeast:
- Death Digger:
- Dagger Toad Robeast:
- Twin Equinox Dragon:
- Robo-Golem Robeast:
- Black Poison Duskbeast:
- King Hydraxis:
- Razorface:
- Death-Knight Crusader:
- Beachhead Robeast:
- Demon Bluegore:
- Cyberai Robeast:
- Repto-Boxer:
- Invincibeast:
- Doom Gladiator Robeast:
- Astroblaster:
- Bladebug Robeast:
- Planet Compactor:
- Sentrius:
- Blackstar Unicorn Robeast:
- Krushborg Robeast:
- Monster Vultura:
- Astronomax:
- Drule Defender Prime:
- Drule Defender Sigma:
- Drule Defender Gamma:
- Target Master Robeast:
- Terrormax Elite-Beast Gold:
- Terrormax Elite-Beast Silver:
- Terrormax Elite-Beast Bronze:

=== Dracotron ===
Exclusive to Voltron: The Third Dimension, evil counterparts to the lions based on dragons, the Dragons lived in an alternate dimension, but were so ferocious and destructive that they left it a desolate wasteland, forcing them to travel to other dimensions to steal food as well as structures within which to protect their eggs from their atmosphere. The most powerful Dragon is Black Draco, the black dragon. Five Dragons can merge to form Dracotron, an evil incarnation of Voltron with a superblast attack so strong, as indirectly stated in Third Dimension, that two blasts can destroy Voltron. In Third Dimension, the Dragons and Dracotron make multiple appearances and are destroyed each time, indicating that possibly any five Dragons can merge into a Dracotron.

=== Human Enemies ===
- Sky Marshall Wade (voiced by Garry Chalk): Exclusive to Voltron Force, he is a corrupt official who simply wants money and power, having the highest seat of power in the Galaxy Alliance. Originally a Galaxy Alliance cadet, Wade tried to become a Voltron pilot, but he was rejected because the Black Lion found him unworthy. Rejected and humiliated, this caused Wade to go insane. It is revealed that he deeply saw Voltron as simply power and not as defender of the universe and this is one of the reasons why he was not worthy enough to become a Voltron pilot. From there, he engineered the Lions' being outlawed by sabotaging them to go berserk and took the Black Lion to reverse engineer its technology so as to create his own robot lion that he could control via virtual interface along with his remote controlled robot soldiers. When the Voltron Force reassembled, Wade used his robot lion to try to eliminate them, but his creation was absorbed by Kala, and he was rendered unconscious throughout the remainder of the fight. Though his plan failed and he is finally arrested for his crimes, Wade learns of his mental link to Kala and is later freed by her as he allows himself to be assimilated into her Lider RoBeast body so he can use its ability to fuse with Voltron.
- Dudley: Exclusive to Voltron Force, he is a kid from Earth who is "Voltron's biggest fan". When the Voltron cadets came to Earth, he showed them his outstanding collection of Voltron franchise, but they soon grew tired of it and left. Taking the act as a mockery of his collection, he attacked them with his Voltron replica (complete with limited edition Blazing Sword), but the cadets formed Awesometron and defeated him. He then stated they were true Voltron cadets.

== Voltron: Legendary Defender ==
=== Team Voltron ===
- Lieutenant/Commander Takashi "Shiro" Shirogane (voiced by Josh Keaton) – The Black Paladin, pilot of the Black Lion and Guardian Spirit of Sky. Leader of the Defenders of the Universe, Shiro was captured by the Galra Empire a year before the start of the series during which he was given a weaponized prosthetic right arm. A natural, decisive leader, Shiro is calm and always in control. Shiro's bayard was lost with the original Black Paladin. The Black Lion forms the head and torso of Voltron. In the last episode of Season 2, Shiro reclaims his bayard from Zarkon and is able to use it to transform Voltron's sword into a "blazing sword" to defeat Zarkon, but after the battle, it is revealed that he has mysteriously vanished. But in season three, it is revealed he was teleported to a Galra ship, escaped, and was eventually found by the team. The Black Lion did not accept him as its pilot afterwards, but when Keith was absent during an intense battle, he manages to re-establish his bond with the Black Lion. In the last episode of season five, it is ultimately revealed that he has become an unwilling mole of Haggar, who controls his eyes to keep an eye on Lotor. After Keith and Romelle revealed Lotor's true intentions, Haggar took full control over Shiro. Keith took after Shiro, which ultimately led to a fight that would involve Keith cutting off Shiro's cybernetic arm. After the fight, Keith discovered that Shiro's soul was trapped inside of the Black Lion as his physical body died when he went against Zarkon. The Shiro that was with the Paladins since then was a clone of him. After the Paladins defeat Lotor, Allura uses her powers to transfer Shiro's soul into the clone's body, fully restoring him to normal, but turning his hair completely white. He had an ex-boyfriend back on earth, named Adam, who broke up with him when Shiro chose to follow his dream and went on the Kerberos Mission, despite a disease he has. Following the launch of the IGF-ATLAS, Shiro becomes its captain. At the end of the series, he marries a crew member of the IGF-ATLAS named Curtis.
- Keith (voiced by Steven Yeun) – The Red Paladin, pilot of the Red Lion, current leader of Voltron and pilot of the Black Lion, as well as Guardian Spirit of Fire. Formerly a cadet at the Galaxy Garrison before getting kicked out, Keith was an orphan and the best pilot of his generation. Keith engineered Shiro's escape when his pod crashed on Earth. Keith is quiet but fiercely protective of not just those he loves but the universe. Keith's bayard takes the form of a double edged sword, and it can create a large sword for Voltron to wield. With the bayards of the blue, green and yellow Lions, it can be made big enough to slice through giant warships. The Red Lion forms the right arm of Voltron. In Season 2, Keith discovers he has Galra blood, from his mother, who gave his father the Luxite knife which led him to the biggest undercover organization in the universe – the Blade of Marmora. This revelation caused Allura to treat him coldly for a while. During Shiro's absence, Keith takes over piloting the Black Lion in season 3 but, at the start of season 4, Keith officially steps down as the leader of Voltron while handing the position back to Shiro so that he can continue his work with the Blade of Marmora. In season 5, Keith helps a fellow Blade named Krolia who is working undercover as second-in-command to a Galra general known as a fearsome warlord and is later revealed to be his mother. After Keith returned with Romelle, Krolia, and a cosmic wolf, he went back to piloting the Black Lion and nearly died several times to save Shiro. At the end of the series, Keith turned the Blade of Marmora into an Intergalactic humanitarian relief organization.
- Lance (voiced by Jeremy Shada) – The Blue Paladin, pilot of the Blue Lion, overtaker pilot of the Red Lion, and Guardian Spirit of Water. Lance was the fighter pilot of his team at the Galaxy Garrison. Fairly outgoing, cocky, flirty, and confident, Lance is the class clown of the paladins and likes to think of himself as a ladies' man. However, he can actually be quite sensitive, reflective, and distant at times when his teammates are not around or when his guard is lowered and he sometimes suffers from self-esteem issues. Lance clashed frequently with Keith and the two claimed to be rivals but, with the passage of time, grew to like each other and became friends. Lance is a natural sharpshooter and skilled marksman with his bayard taking the form of a rifle (as well as the form of an Altean broadsword in Season 5; Allura states that this is extremely rare, and it seems to signify some special ability). The Blue Lion forms the right leg of Voltron. He deeply misses Earth, and wants to complete the mission of destroying Zarkon so that he can return to his family, which includes his parents, his brothers Marco and Luis, his sisters Veronica and Rachel, his sister in law Lisa, who is married to Luis, his niece and nephew Sylvio and Nadia, and his grandparents. Lance takes over piloting the Red Lion in Season 3. Allura explaining that Lance chose to accept that Keith would make a better leader, just like her father did with Zarkon. Starting from Season 3, he gradually matures and starts loving sincerely Allura, and the two will have a romance in Season 8. At the end of the series, Lance continues to spread Allura's message and protect things that she loved.
- Katie "Pidge" Holt (voiced by Bex Taylor-Klaus) – The Green Paladin, pilot of the Green Lion, and Guardian Spirit of Forest. After her father, brother, and Shiro disappeared on a mission with the Garrison and were declared dead, she broke into the Garrison offices several times and was banned from the premises, leading her to disguise herself as a boy named Pidge Gunderson and attend the institute in secret. Pidge is very focused on finding her brother and father, and is seen working on locating them nearly constantly until they are finally found in Season 4 and 5 respectively. Like her parents and brother, Pidge is extremely intelligent and passionate about STEM-related topics, developing many technological devices for the team, including a cloaking device for her lion. Pidge's bayard takes the form of a katar that can be charged with electricity. The Green Lion forms the left arm of Voltron. At the end of the series. Pidge is now working with her family, to build the next generation of Legendary Defenders.
- Hunk (voiced by Tyler Labine) – The Yellow Paladin, pilot of the Yellow Lion and Guardian Spirit of Land. Hunk was the engineer of his team at Galaxy Garrison. A gentle giant with an equally large appetite, Hunk is the heart of the team, lifting them up and making peace between them. After witnessing first hand the devastation and misery that Zarkon's conquest of the universe has brought upon the people of various worlds, Hunk is determined to free those enslaved. He is highly intelligent and along with Pidge, performs much of the team's engineering and technology-related duties. Hunk's bayard takes the form of an energy cannon and it can arm Voltron with a large shoulder cannon that can shoot multiple targets. The Yellow Lion forms the left leg of Voltron. At the end of the series, Hunk now owns an intergalactic catering company.
- Princess Allura (voiced by Kimberly Brooks) – Crown Princess of Altea and the Blue Paladin, Allura is an Altean. Pilot and keeper of the Castle of Lions, a structure that is a castle and a spaceship, Allura was responsible for granting the Defenders their title and sending them on their mission to liberate the universe, wishing more than anything to finish her father's work in stopping Zarkon. In season 3, she takes over piloting the Blue Lion. As an Altean, Allura's abilities include the chameleon-like ability to be able to blend in with a species (something that made her people incredible diplomats and explorers). She has a telepathic bond to the Altean mice that were in her cryo-pod with her. At the end of Season 2, Allura discovers she has magical abilities, though not much is known about them yet. Unlike her original counterpart, who was Caucasian and had blonde hair, she has brown skin and white hair. She starts a romance with Lance in season 8. In season 8, Allura sacrifices her to save every reality. Her sacrifice has restored all once destroyed planets, including Altea.
- Coran Hieronymus Wimbleton Smythe (voiced by Rhys Darby, Finn Darby as a teen, Theo Darby as a child) – The Royal advisor to Princess Allura and the last male Altean. Energetic, eccentric, and excitable, Coran serves Allura dutifully whilst being fiercely protective over her. He tends to ramble on and off about his past, particularly about his supposedly daring feats or past experiences. Despite his odd and quirky character, he is a reliable and steadfast ally to his princess and the Paladins.
- Space Mice – The four space mice – Chuchule, Platt, Chulatt, and Plachu – are creatures who inhabit the Castle and can communicate with Allura, frequently telling her about the activities of the Castle's inhabitants and other pieces of information. This was due to Allura and the mice sharing a pod for 10,000 years.
- Kosmo – A blue teleporting space wolf found and adopted by Keith and his mother, Krolia while they were traversing the Quantum Abyss. When Keith rejoined the Voltron paladins, the wolf did as well. Since then, Kosmo has become an invaluable member of Team Voltron, utilizing its unique teleportation abilities to aid Keith in battle and assist the Paladins in infiltrating Galra facilities.
- Kaltenecker – A cow that was acquired by Pidge and Lance at the Space Mall. The cow was given away free with the purchase of an Earth game system.

==== Voltron ====
- Voltron: is the defender of the universe created by the inhabitants of Altea and Daibazaal after a comet of trans-reality ore landed on the planet Dailbazaal. Zarkon's wife, Honerva, however, became obsessed with the Quintessence found in the reality rift, but the exposure was damaging her health. In order to save Honerva, Zarkon attempted to bring her into the rift using Voltron so he could save her with the Quintessence, but the overexposure killed them, forcing Alfor to destroy Daibazaal in order to close the rift after the end of their funeral. However, Zarkon and Honerva were then resurrected, but had become changed and corrupted by their ordeal. Zarkon flew into a rage at Alfor and the Alteans for the loss of the rift, sparking a war and the beginning of the Galra Empire. Zarkon desired to capture Voltron so he could use the robot's power to create another rift and obtain an infinite amount of Quintessence. This led Alfor to scatter the lions across the universe to keep it out of the hands of the Galra Empire and tied Allura's life force to the giant robot. The Black Lion remained inside the Castle of Lions, and was inaccessible unless the other four were recovered, while the other four were hidden on various planets, with the Blue Lion ending up on Earth. The Red Lion was later found and captured by the Galrans, but rescued by Keith after he bonded with it. These versions of the Voltron Lions will only bond with particular pilots, with the Red Lion notably refusing to bond with Keith until he had proven himself. Each Lion has the ability to fire laser blasts, and each provides a unique weapon to the united Voltron form that is unlocked by each Paladin's use of their Bayard (i.e. the red Bayard unlocks Voltron's sword); a massive sword can also be formed by combining four out of the five Bayards; when the Black Bayard is returned, the sword is revealed to take on the form of the Blazing Sword. The Lions also appear to be sentient and can connect to the life force of the Paladins. During the final battle against Honerva, the Balmerans used energy to merge Voltron with the IGF-Atlas. At the end of the series, the lions left for parts unknown, awaiting the day that they are needed again.
  - Black Lion: Piloted initially by Shiro and later by Keith, the Black Lion forms the main body and head of Voltron. The pilot for the Black Lion has to be a natural born leader, able to keep his head cool at all times, and those who would follow them without question. Another way to pilot the Black Lion is to have the potential of being a leader, as seen when Keith was able to pilot the Black Lion at the beginning of season 2. In seasons 1 and 2, Shiro had to fight Zarkon's bond with the Black Lion. This strong connection between Zarkon and the Black Lion, that Zarkon used it to track the Castle of Lions. There was also a risk of Zarkon taking control of Voltron through the Black Lion. Shiro was able to strengthen the bond between him and the Black Lion, reducing these risks. After Zarkon's death, these risks were eliminated.
    - Legendary Defender features: Shield formed by wings, expanding wings, mouth blade, Black Bayard unlocks sword which can become the powerful Blazing Sword. When used with the Red Bayard Voltron's wings become boosters. When used with the other 4 Bayard's the sword becomes a Scimitar. The Black Bayard, along with the Blue Bayard, are the only ones who have never unlocked a weapon for Voltron without need another Bayard.
  - Red Lion: Piloted initially by Keith and later by Lance, the Red Lion forms the right arm of Voltron. The pilot for the Red Lion must rely on instinct than skill alone. Another way someone to be chosen to pilot the Red Lion, is someone who puts the needs of others above their own self glory.
    - Legendary Defender features: Fastest of the lions, heat resistance, magma beam, back mounted rail gun, produces sword unlocked by the Red Bayard. When used with the Black Bayard, Voltron's wings become boosters. When used with the Green Bayard, Voltron can wield dual swords. When used with the other Bayard's, Voltron's Sword becomes a Scimitar.
  - Green Lion: Piloted by Pidge, the Green Lion forms the left arm of Voltron. In Legendary Defender Pidge refers to the Green Lion as female, similar to how the character of Pidge is reimagined as a girl in the series. To pilot the Green Lion, one must be both intellectual and daring.
    - Legendary Defender features: Cloaking mode installed by Pidge, "Vine Beam" that causes spontaneous plant life growth, arm cannon unlocked by the Green Bayard. When used with the Red Bayard, Voltron can wield Dual Swords. When used with the other Bayard's, Voltron's sword becomes a Scimitar.
  - Blue Lion: Piloted initially by Lance and later by Allura, the Blue Lion forms the right leg of Voltron. The requirements to pilot the Blue Lion has never been explained, but the best guess is that one must deeply care for the lives of others.
    - Legendary Defender features: "Ice Ray", sonic blaster, unknown weapon unlocked by the Blue Bayard. When used with the Yellow Bayard, Voltron can use missile launchers. When used with the other Bayard's, Voltron's sword becomes a Scimitar. The Blue Bayard, along with the Black Bayard, are the only ones to never unlock a weapon without the use of another Bayard.
  - Yellow Lion: Piloted by Hunk, the Yellow Lion forms the left leg of Voltron. To pilot the Yellow Lion, one must care deeply about others, and has a kind heart.
    - Legendary Defender features: Heaviest armor of the lions, additional claws and a jet booster, shoulder cannon unlocked by the Yellow Bayard capable of single or multi-shots. When used with the Blue Bayard, Voltron can used missile launchers. When used with the other Bayard's, Voltron's sword becomes a Scimitar.
- IGF-ATLAS: The IGF-ATLAS is a battleship, it was built by Pidge's father to replace the Castle of Lions. It original was nonfunctional because of its lack of a power source, this was resolved by using a crystal made from the Castle of Lions. Like the Castle of Lions the ATLAS has hangars for all five of the Lions and can Charge them. The ATLAS can transform into a giant robot. The ATLAS also has the ability to combine with Voltron. The ATLAS originally lacked any close-range weapons, but when combined with Voltron, it can wield a Great Sword. When combined with Voltron, the ATLAS can also travel to other realities. What became of the ATLAS at the end of the series is unknown, but it is now probably being used as a base for the next generation of Legendary Defenders.

=== Voltron Coalition ===
Allies who joined Voltron in their fight against first the Galra Empire and later Honerva...

- Rolo (voiced by Norman Reedus in season 1, Tyler Rhoads from season 4 onwards) – An alien bounty hunter who joins the Voltron Coalition with his partner Nyma and their cyber-unit Beezer.
- Nyma (voiced by Lacey Chabert) – An alien bounty hunter and partner of Rolo.
- Beezer – A robot belonging to Rolo and Nyma.
- Ryner (voiced by Mindy Sterling) – Current leader of the Olkari following the betrayal of King Lubos. Ryner and some of her people escaped into the forest following Galra occupation of their planet. They lived their for many years, eventually adapting their skills with machines and technology to nature and used coded spores as SOS messages. Team Voltron answered this distress call and Ryner helped them organize a rescue of their King. When she discovered that their King had betrayed them, she rallied her people to take back their city and helped Pidge bond with the Green Lion to unlock her new weapon. Later, Ryner and the Olkari assisted the team in constructing a giant teluduv for them as well as housing many refugees on their planet. Pidge later learned that Ryner died after Honerva's robeast attacked Olkarion.
- Olia (voiced by Jessica McKenna) – A pilot and captain of the rebel forces.
- Commander Ozar (voiced by John DiMaggio) – A commander in the Voltron Coalition. Sent by Shiro to conduct reconnaissance on Honerva's forces, he and his squadron were subsequently killed by Honerva's mechas.
- Atlas Crew
  - Commander Iverson (voiced by Nolan North) – A commander at Galaxy Garrison. When he discovered Katie hacking into his computer for information on the Kerberos mission and her family, he had her removed and barred her from ever setting foot in the Garrison again, prompting her to assume a false, male identity to continue her search. The plan was successful, as Iverson failed to recognize her.
  - Commander Samuel "Sam" Holt (voiced by Nolan North) – Matt and Pidge's father, who went missing after being taken prisoner of the Galra Empire during the Galaxy Garrison's expedition to Kerberos. Pidge has been searching for him and her brother Matt ever since. After being captured, he was separated from his two crew and sent to a work camp with prisoners deemed too weak to fight. He is ultimately discovered by his two children in season five, as they then reunite. After Zarkon's death and Lotor's ascension as the new emperor, he returns to Earth.
  - Colleen Holt (voiced by Renee Faia) – Sam's wife and Matt and Pidge's mother. She joins her family on board the Atlas as its botanical genius.
  - Slav (voiced by Iqbal Theba) – An eccentric genius who developed gravity-bending technology that could create a pocket of space-time capable of concealing an entire outpost from view or collapsing a Robeast from the inside. The Galra Empire was desperate to claim this technology, and imprisoned Slav in a highly fortified installation known as Beta Traz, where he was subjected to torture to extract his knowledge for use in creating genetic and technological enhancements for the Galra Empire. He was called upon to build another gravity generator to conceal an enormous Teludav, or wormhole generator, intended for use against Zarkon's command ship. His intelligence makes him aware of numerous alternate realities-so many in fact that he has difficulty distinguishing them from the one in which he currently resides. The Paladins meet an alternate reality version of him, who is a rebel fighter of the Guns of Gamara against the Altean Empire. Slav reappeared at the end of Season 7, arriving on Earth with the Coalition members and happily meeting Veronica.
  - Matthew "Matt" Holt (voiced by Blake Anderson) – Pidge's older brother. Much like his parents and sister, he is highly intelligent, and was accepted to the Galaxy Garrison after finishing high school. Along with his father and Shiro, he was a member of the Kerberos mission and was one of the three declared dead, prompting Pidge to infiltrate the Garrison in order to find him and her father. Immediately after the incident on Kerberos, he was abducted by the Galra, who sent his father to a labor camp and Matt and Shiro to fight in the gladiatorial ring. In an effort to save a terrified Matt from certain death, Shiro staged aggression towards Matt for being the one to fight first and injured him so that he would be exempt from fighting the gladiator. Some time after this, he was rescued from a Galra prison by a group of rebel fighters and worked alongside them until Pidge finally locates and reunites with him in Season 4, prompting him to join the Voltron Coalition. Matt is a young man, likely in his late teens or very early twenties, with light brown hair and features greatly resembling his sister. Prior to the Kerberos mission, he wore glasses, but gave them to Pidge when his vision was corrected in preparation for the mission and he no longer had a use for them. He has a scar that runs diagonally under his left eye, which he seems to have acquired in or after Galra imprisonment. Matt continued to fight alongside the rebels and eventually contacted his family on Earth, warning them not to broadcast their location as it could put them in danger and that Voltron has been missing for months. Following Earth's liberation, Matt returns to Earth with his robotic significant other, N-7, and is reunited with his family.
  - James Griffin (voiced by A.J. LoCascio) – Leader of the Garrison pilots chosen to pilot the MFE-Ares Fighters. He was a former rival of Keith. He respects the abilities of his team, often relying on Leifsdottir for her expertise in tactical analysis.
  - Nadia Rizavi (voiced by Zehra Fazal) – One of the MFE pilots, she is always ready for adventure and enjoys being a fighter pilot. Nadia has a mischievous streak. She also has the same first name as Lance's niece.
  - Ryan Kinkade (voiced by Bumper Robinson) – One of the MFE pilots who seldom speaks. He has a penchant for video-recording his and others lives.
  - Ina Leifsdottir (voiced by Anna Graves) – One of the MFE pilots, she is excellent at calculations and tactical analyses.
  - Veronica (voiced by Krystina Alabado) – Lance's sister, Veronica is an analyst of the Garrison. She plays a crucial role in the battle against the Galra, participating in regular missions with Griffin's squad and later serves as a crew member aboard the Atlas.
  - Acxa (voiced by Anika Noni Rose from "Red Paladin" to "The Hunted", Erica Luttrell from "Hole in the Sky" onwards and Cherise Boothe for her sole line in "Kral Zera" only) – Calculating and highly intelligent, she stays calm and does not rush into situations. She was also revealed to have previously aided Keith and Hunk when all three were trapped in the belly of the Weblum. Acxa betrayed Lotor in retaliation for Narti's death, but this turned out to be a ruse concocted by Lotor in order to trick the Paladins into accepting him as an ally. However, when Lotor, in his madness, declared he would also wipe out the Galra, Acxa, Ezor and Zethrid chose to abandon him for good. After Voltron's battle with Lotor, Acxa would later choose to side with the Voltron Coalition and was instrumental in helping the Paladins escape her former fellow generals' clutches. At the end of the series, Acxa joined The Blade of Marmora.
  - Romelle (voiced by Mimi Davila, Lacey Chabert in "Defender of All Universes") – The first Altean Colonial to join the Voltron Coalition, Romelle is perceptive and very inquisitive. Despite discovering that a number of her family were murdered, Romelle is also a cheerful and bubbly person. The Altean colony and its descendants eventually came to worship Lotor as their savior, but Romelle had many questions, in particular about a second colony Lotor had started. Only viable candidates could make the journey and contact was strictly forbidden. Having already lost her parents to this colony, Romelle pleaded with her younger brother, Bandor, not to go. Bandor, faithful to Lotor, assured her that she could join them some day and gave his sister a secret communicator. One night, Bandor contacted her and Romelle discovered him dying in a crashed pod. Bandor revealed the second colony was a lie, but Romelle knew she could not prove it to the others. By chance, she was discovered by Keith and Krolia, who had come to investigate the colony and they shared what information they knew. To Romelle's horror, they discovered that the Alteans taken to the second colony were in fact being harvested for their quintessence. Keith brought Romelle back to the Castle to testify this information to the Paladins in order to reveal Lotor's deceit and treachery. Afterwards, Romelle remained with the group as they journeyed back to Earth and continued their efforts against the Galra Empire. She would later join the Atlas crew.
  - Curtis (voiced by Blake Michael) – A Galaxy Garrison officer who handles communications and analysis duties, and later fills a similar role aboard the Atlas. He's a kind man who works closely with both Veronica and Sam Holt.
  - Bae Bae: The Holt family dog.
- Blade of Marmora: An ancient order of Galra who opposes Zarkon's rule because Zarkon proved more interested in power than in the stability they believed his rule promised. They soon became allies of the Voltron Coalition.
  - Kolivan (voiced by Mark Rolston) – The leader of the Blade of Marmora, who is skeptical of trusting Voltron's Paladins and subjects Keith to a ritual of the Trials of Marmora after he refuses to give up a Galra knife he has possessed since childhood. When Keith succeeds in "awakening" the blade, he reveals that Keith has Galra blood. He later accompanies Keith and Shiro back to the Castle of Lions to meet with Allura, where he reveals that the Galra have learned of their existence, forcing them to step up their plans to take down Zarkon. This plan would involve shutting down Zarkon's command ship, enabling Allura to send it through a massive wormhole to a distant galaxy. During the battle between Voltron and Zarkon he joins Allura and Antok in battling Haggar and her Druids, and they succeed in defeating them though at the cost of Antok's life. After Lotor's defeat, Kolivan was captured by a Druid named Macidus and used to lure in other Blade members to their deaths before being rescued by the Paladins. With Krolia's help, he rebuilt the Blade of Marmora. He is later seen with Krolia watching over Keith on Earth as he recovers. He joins the crew of the Atlas.
  - Thace (voiced by Mick Wingert) – A military officer of the Galra Empire, Thace betrays Zarkon by lowering a barrier to allow the Lions, their Paladins, and the Castle of Lions to escape. He is later revealed to be a member of the Blade of Marmora, a secret group of Galrans who are against Zarkon's rule. In the end, Thace sacrifices himself to ensure the success of the mission to defeat Zarkon, and dies with honor and satisfaction.
  - Ulaz (voiced by Arnold Vosloo) – A Galra Scientist, who Shiro remembers as the one who helped him escape the Galra Empire, and a member of the Blade of Marmora. He gives the Paladins coordinates to the Blade of Marmora's primary headquarters and sacrifices himself to save the Paladins.
  - Antok (voiced by Trevor Devall) – A member of the Blade of Marmora who serves as a brute warrior and who has a tail. After challenging Keith at the Blade of Marmora headquarters, he joins Kolivan in boarding the Castle of Lions for the remainder of the second season. He, Kolivan, and Allura later board Zarkon's command ship in order to battle Haggar and her Druids. As a result of the battle against Haggar, Antok is killed, his face having never been seen.
  - Regris (voiced by Josh Keaton) – A member of the Blade of Marmora, who helps Keith and Kolivan during their mission before sacrificing himself in "Code of Honor". Like Antok, his face was never revealed.
  - Krolia (voiced by Ana Gasteyer) – A spy for the Blade of Marmora, and Keith's long-lost mother. After Sendak found the Red Lion, the Galra engineered a way to detect the Lion's signals at close range and Zarkon sent thousands of scouts out to search. The Blade embedded many agents into these scouting parties in an effort prevent them from finding anymore Lions. When Krolia's scouting party discovered the Blue Lion on Earth, she gunned down her fellow scouts to keep its location secret, but was shot down herself. She was rescued and nursed back to health by Keith's father and eventually fell in love with him. Over time, she considered being stranded on Earth a blessing and dedicated herself to protecting the Blue Lion, with help from Keith's father. Shortly after, Keith was born. She wanted to name him Yorak, but his father suggested Keith instead. One night, another scouting group arrived and Krolia and Keith's father set out to stop them. Though successful, her lover was injured in the fight. Realizing that the Galra could find the Blue Lion again, Krolia resolved to return to the Blades and continue fighting against the Galra from the inside. She kissed her infant son goodbye and left her luxite knife with her lover before departing.
  - Ilun (voiced by Cherise Boothe)
  - Vrek (voiced by Nolan North)

=== Galra Empire ===
The Galra Empire is a 13,000-year-old empire that has been invading planets and stealing quintessence, an extremely powerful form of energy that they use to power their war machines. They are also known for saluting each other using the phrase "Vrepit sa," which means the "Killing Thrust". Their homeworld was Daibazaal.

- Emperor Zarkon (voiced by Neil Kaplan, Kevin Durand as a young adult in season 3 episode "The Legend Begins") – Zarkon is the ruler of the ruthless Galra Empire, and lord and master of most of the known universe after spending the last ten thousand years conquering a vast majority of it. He desires the Lions of Voltron, not only because they represent the biggest threat to his campaign, but because he is later revealed to be the Black Paladin before Shiro, from a time when most of the Galra were allies of the Alteans, and still possessing the Black Paladin bayard. As such, he views the Lions as his own property rather than seeing himself as a former chosen one to pilot the Black Lion. He is able to use his bayard in far more advanced ways than the current Paladins, able to form a myriad of energy weapons with which he can easily go toe-to-toe directly with the Lions themselves. In the last episode of Season 2, Zarkon faces Voltron and the Paladins in an experimental mecha armor and is defeated but left in critical condition, requiring life-support. By the end of season 3, his history is fully revealed and Haggar successfully reawakens him. Soon afterwards, he starts a manhunt for Lotor. In season 5, Zarkon confronts his son Lotor, which ultimately results in his death.
- Witch Haggar (voiced by Cree Summer and Lily Rabe as Honerva) – Formerly an Altean alchemist named Honerva but now a mysterious and despicable witch, Haggar is Zarkon's wife, primary adviser, high priestess, and leader of the Druids, dark mystics who fanatically serve the Galra Empire. Haggar is both a dangerous sorceress and a mad scientist. She combines her unnatural magicks with abominable science to create powerful weapons to arm soldiers, terrible monsters (dubbed "Robeasts" in the second season) to fight Voltron, and leech entire planets (and other sources) of the mystical energy known as Quintessence. In battle, her magical abilities allow her to teleport, cast illusions, fog the mind with hallucinations, and use her hands to project energy blasts and shields. Haggar is revealed to be Altean in the second-season finale, and orders the remaining Galran commanders to summon their lord's son, Prince Lotor and is revealed to be Lotor's mother in season four as mentioned by Lotor when he refers her by her real name Honerva in addition to regaining memories of her being his mother in season five. In season six, Haggar finds and journeys to Oriande, a mystical realm that is the birthplace of Altean alchemy. The trip restores her and she changes back to Honerva. Upon learning of Lotor's supposed death, Honerva destroys all the Galra at the Kral Zera, and manipulates Lotor's Alteans into serving her on Oriande.
  - Druids – the Galra druids were formed by Haggar in order to harvest quintessence when Zarkon began his quest to conquer the known universe.
    - Macidus (voiced by Chris Diamantopoulos) – One of Haggar's Druids. Macidus first appeared in season 1, where he battled and injured Keith after the Paladin tried to steal a sample of concentrated quintessence. They would not meet again until years later, after Haggar abandoned the Druids and Macidus, in an attempt to regain favor with her, captured Kolivan and used a signal to lure in members of the Blade of Marmora, systematically eliminating many of their numbers. He was finally killed by Keith.
- Prince Lotor (voiced by A.J. LoCascio) – The Crown Prince of the Galra Empire and son of Zarkon and Haggar. Unlike his father, he desires to inspire loyalty to the planets they conquer rather than fear to make the Galra Empire stronger. He is an expert combatant and cunning strategist. Like his generals, Lotor is not pure Galra, but is a hybrid, being half Galra and half Altean. After Zarkon awoke he dismissed Lotor from his duties and then declared open season on his life, after learning on what he was planning. With his generals turning against him and forced into a corner, Lotor assists the Voltron Coalition to win a harrowing battle at the last second, and offers a truce. He then becomes an ally to Team Voltron, in spite of some reluctance to this idea at first. After killing Zarkon, Lotor became the new Emperor, despite the fact that he is half-Galra and remains an ally to Team Voltron. While helping the Voltron Coalition, Lotor created a bond with Princess Allura, that then later developed into romantic feelings reciprocated by her. However, it is later revealed that Lotor saved many Alteans from the destruction of their home world and deceived them so that he could harvest their quintessence in order to build a new Altean Empire. In the season six finale, Voltron defeated him and despite Allura's offers to save him, he is left stranded in the rift until Honerva was able to bring him and his Sincline Mech back. However, he has already died.

==== Fire of Purification ====
A splinter faction of Galra who chose to leave the Empire when Lotor assumed the throne. His forces lead an invasion of planet Earth.

- Commander Sendak (voiced by Jake Eberle) – A ruthless and fearsome commander within the Galra Empire, Sendak was ordered to capture the Lions and destroy the Paladins, marking the first battle that the team has had with him, and tries a second time by infiltrating the Castle of Lions when still on Arus and almost succeeded if it not been for the efforts of Pidge. Sendak has a cybernetic prosthetic left shoulder and forearm connected by an energy binder that allows him to attack from a distance, using his arm like a flail or to pull himself over great distances. He was captured by the Paladins and placed in suspended animation in an effort to glean his mind of information, only for Shiro to apparently dispose of him out of paranoia. It is later revealed in season five that Sendak survived and Haggar selects him as a possible contender for the throne following the death of Zarkon since she was ineligible as a contender due to her being an Altean. He becomes leader of the "Fire of Purification", his own armada made of Galra who have joined with him after the empire was broken apart. While the Voltron Paladins are missing in action after defeating Lotor, Sendak leads an invasion of planet Earth, capturing many of its citizens and leaving it mostly in ruin. The Galaxy Garrison manages to put up a fight, but are overwhelmed until the Voltron Paladins finally make it back. Sendak is building six cannons that, when their firepower is combined above Earth's atmosphere, will completely destroy the planet. Voltron and the Galaxy Garrison fight back and destroy the cannons and cripple Sendak's command ship and sending it crashing to Earth. Sendak puts up a last stand, but is ultimately killed by Keith.
- Lieutenant Hepta (voiced by Matthew Mercer) – One of Sendak's officers. He is killed by the Lions after he fatally wounds Admiral Sanda.

==== Lotor's Generals ====
Lotor's four loyal female top generals who are each half-Galra. They would later join under Haggar for a while before returning to work for Lotor. When Lotor declared he would wipe out all his enemies, including the rest of the Galra, Acxa, Ezor and Zethrid, disturbed by this statement, abandoned Lotor for good only to be ejected from the Sincline ships by him for their betrayal and were left stranded in space. In season 7, Ezor and Zethrid became Warlords, while Acxa left to find her own path. At the end of the series, Acxa, Ezor and Zethrid joined The Blade of Marmora.

- Acxa – see Voltron Coalition
- Ezor (voiced by Kimiko Glenn) – Has the ability to camouflage like a chameleon and is very agile and acrobatic. She is shown to be rather cheerful and is said to be the most friendly out of the generals. Also shown to be close with Zehtrid. After Voltron's battle with Lotor, Ezor became a pirate warlord with Zethrid and later captured the Paladins three years later, interrogating them on Lotor's fate out of fear that Lotor would come after them in revenge. She was believed to be killed in an explosion, but survived.
- Zethrid (voiced by Jamie Gray Hyder) – She possess great strength and is highly capable at physical combat. She is also bloodthirsty and craves violence. After Voltron's battle with Lotor, Zethrid became a pirate warlord with Ezor and later captured the Paladins three years later. After Ezor left her, Zethrid led a crew of Galra in an attempt to get revenge for Ezor's leaving her, by attempting to kill Keith before being taken in by the Atlas. After seeing Ezor, Zethrid decides it would be best to help the coalition.
- Narti – A quick, strong combatant, she also uses her tail as weapon. She has psychic powers and is able to manipulate others' minds by touching them. Because she is unable to talk on her own and has no eyes, she uses her psychic connection with Kova to communicate and see. Lotor ultimately kills her upon discovering that Haggar is spying on him through her.
  - Kova – A catlike alien who was originally Honerva's pet that now serves as Narti's eyes. Kova soon returned to Haggar's presence following Narti's death.

==== Other Galra ====
- Haxus (voiced by Robin Atkin Downes) – Sendak's chief underling. Falls to his death taking Rover with him.
- Commander Prorok (voiced by Keith Ferguson) – He is a commander working directly under Zarkon who prefers to employ the overwhelming force of the Galra fleet to subtle plans in order to capture Voltron. Following an act of sabotage that allows the Voltron Lions and Castle to escape Galra Central Command, Prorok is punished by Zarkon, despite being innocent, and taken away for interrogation by the Druids, Haggar's order of dark magicians. He is then used by Haggar to give life to a new Robeast that tracks Voltron to a cluster of xanthorium, home to a Galra rebel base. Prorok's Robeast form displays the ability to draw the xanthorium into itself to use as fuel for a powerful laser, as well as drawing Voltron and other objects into its gaping maw. He meets his demise when Ulaz sacrifices himself by crash landing his ship into his Robeast form.
  - Subcommander Ylvik – He is under Prorok's command.
- Commander Morvok (voiced by David W. Collins) – A sadistic, cowardly, and obese commander who robs an entire planet of resources before leaving the inhabitants to die. He is then called upon by Zarkon to capture Voltron, and despite attempts at worming his way out of it is forced to comply with the order. His ship is destroyed shortly after he orders the preparation of his escape pod.
- Varkon and Vrepit Sal (both voiced by Fred Tatasciore) – An overweight Galra mall cop who idolizes Emperor Zarkon, and a Galra restaurateur who initially captures Hunk after he is unable to pay for a meal but later employs him to prepare food in his restaurant.
- The Warden (voiced by Fred Tatasciore) – A villainous Galra with cybernetic implants who oversees the prison of the genius Slav; this prison is also where the Warden keeps his pet yupper Laika. The Warden is equipped with a pair of cybernetic arms in addition to his normal ones, and has a system to inject himself with a substance that greatly increases his size and muscle mass. This enhanced form makes him a greater menace to the Voltron Paladins who come to rescue Slav, but with Slav's aid they are able to make their escape.
  - Laika (voiced by Neil Kaplan) – A massive dog-like alien, she is the Warden's pet yupper.
- Commander Throk (voiced by Tony Curran) – A Galra commander who attempted to overthrow Lotor. He is later transferred to the Ulippa System.
- General Raht (voiced by Bill Millsap) – A Galra general who Haggar tasks with keeping an eye on Prince Lotor. He is killed off screen by Lotor, who then shows his bionic right arm to Haggar as proof that he's dead.
- Commander Ladnok (voiced by Katie Lowes) – A Galra commander who carried Haggar to Naxzela.
- Commander Trugg (voiced by Laura Post) – A Galra commander who goes at war against Ladnok during season 5 and is later killed by Ranveig's weapon in "Bloodlines".
- General Branko (voiced by Ike Amadi) – A Galra general who planned to take the throne following Zarkon's death. He was the one in charge of the Galra occupation of Olkarion and the enslavement of their people, forcing them to build a weaponized cube. He returned following Zarkon's death to lay siege to Olkarion once again with a weapon that turned the very forest of Olkarion against its people. It was ultimately defeated by Voltron and his ship was destroyed.
- Letch – Branko's chief underling.
- Commander Sniv (voiced by Nolan North) – A Galra commander who planned to assassinate Haggar, but ended getting killed by her himself.
- Warlord Ranveig (voiced by Angus Sampson) – One of the fiercest Galra in the empire, he was developing a weapon for the Galra.
- Commander Gnov (voiced by Cherise Boothe) – One of Zarkon's most trusted advisors. After the Empire fractured during the Kral Zera, she attempted to kill Keith before Acxa stuns her with her gun, thus saving his life.
- Quartermaster Janka (voiced by Fred Tatasciore) – Oversees supply rounds. He is later killed by Sendak.
- Galra Archivist (voiced by Michael Bell) – A Galra present at the Kral Zera.
- Brodar – One of the former rulers of the Galra.
- Vrig the Great – One of the former rulers of the Galra after Brodar, and before Zarkon.
- General Herreh (voiced by Mark Rolston) – A Galra general who, along with Ladnok, carried Haggar to Naxzela.
- Dayak (voiced by Mary McDonald and Andrea Romano in flashback) – A Galra who served as Lotor's governess.
- Commander Bogh (voiced by Trevor Torseth) – Galra commander who is in command of the Omega Shield and is very honorable.
- Lieutenant/Warlord Lahn (voiced by Ray Chase) – A Galra under Bogh's command. He joins the Voltron Coalition after being saved twice.
- Commander Mar (voiced by Kevin Durand) – A Galra under Haggar's command.
- Commander Drick (voiced by Grey Griffin)
- Doctor Haggar (voiced by Grey Griffin)
- Fentress (voiced by Kari Wahlgren)

==== Robeasts & Mechas ====
The Galra Empire employs Robeasts and mechas generally created by Haggar and her Druids, albeit simply called "Beasts" until Hunk gives them their more popular name in "Shiro's Escape." There is one noticeable distinction between Robeasts and Mechas: Robeasts are generally mechs powered and given life by the quintessence of a being's soul forcefully implanted into the beast and controlled by Haggar's dark magic while Mechas are generally mechs controlled by a pilot.

- Gladiator Robeast – A bulky Robeast infused with the soul of a Galra Gladiator named Myzax who was previously defeated by Shiro. He possessed a powerful arm cannon based on his gladiator weapon, capable of producing an energy orb that he could fire and then control, using it to strike at enemies when they attempted to attack him. However, Haggar either did not or could not improve upon the design, and Shiro's memories of his early battle enabled the Voltron pilots to defeat the Gladiator and destroy him.
- Laser Robeast – A Robeast imbued with the life essence of a lizard-like alien, with the ability to fire powerful energy beams from its eyes, a port in its torso, and several ports along its lengthy arms. Its ability to fire multiple blasts at once or concentrate them all into a powerful orb proved a formidable threat to the Voltron Paladins, with the combined blast proving stronger than Voltron's shoulder cannon. However, they were able to use the cannon's multi-shot feature to hit all the ports at once, and managed to land a devastating blow to the Robeast, which was later encased in crystal by the Balmera that they were fighting on. However, the creature later revived (albeit now headless), having undergone a metamorphosis in which its power was increased and it gained a pair of massive Balmera crystals corrupted by its energy as shields. However, by working together, they were able to breach its defenses and finish it off with Voltron's sword.
- Prorok Robeast – A Robeast created using former Commander Prorok, it resembles a mechanical version of his head with a pair of arms and is larger than the fully formed Voltron. This Robeast has the ability to produce a tractor beam from its mouth, which it can use to draw in heavily unstable materials to fuel its laser weapon or to draw in enemy targets such as Voltron. An attempt by the Paladins to destroy it by crashing it into an explosive asteroid proved fruitless, and it was only the sacrifice of Ulaz, a member of the Blade of Marmora, that saw this Robeast meeting its end, crushed by an artificially produced singularity.
- Zarkon's Mecha – A powerful and monstrous construct created solely for Zarkon's personal use against Voltron. Every subject who tested it was killed prior to Zarkon piloting it into battle himself, because the test subjects did not have the strength of dark quintessence inside of them. It shared Voltron's ability to produce weapons when unlocked by a Bayard, specifically the Black Bayard that Zarkon retained as the Black Lion's original Paladin, such as an energy sword and a segmented chain weapon. It seems to have had additional abilities based on those of the Black Lion, such as a massive pair of wings that allowed it to fly through space at high speeds and that could form shields capable of neutralizing Voltron's shoulder cannon blast. It was also capable of deflecting a full power blast from the Castle of Lions' weapons, but proved unable to stop the Black Lion from recovering the Black Bayard from Zarkon; it retained its weaponry despite this loss. It was finally destroyed after Shiro used the Black Bayard to unlock Voltron's Blazing Sword, which Voltron used to cut through and destroy the armor, and nearly killed Zarkon.
- Olkarion Tree Beast – A self-replicating organic wetware that acted like a computer virus upon the Olkari's tree mechs, fusing a large number of them to form a colossal weapon which then proceeded to attack the capital. it was designed by Olkari scientists during Commander Branko's occupation of Olkarion, and upon hearing Voltron had returned to the planet, Branko released it in an attempt to destroy the Voltron Coalition.
- Sincline Ships – Spacecraft that Lotor had constructed in secret using ore from the second trans-reality comet. Uniting all three Sincline ships combine into a Voltron-esque Sincline Mech, piloted solely by Lotor when he used the Sincline mech for a final battle against Voltron, demonstrating the Sincline Mech's ability to enter the quintessence field at will. Voltron was able to replicate this technique for a final showdown within the quintessence field. Voltron channeled all of its energy into one huge blast that destroyed Lotor once and for all.
- Komar Mechas – After finally defeating Sendak and liberating Earth from Galra occupation, Voltron was suddenly attacked by a mysterious mech of unknown origin. It appeared similar in style to Lotor's Sincline mech, but also had the ability to drain quintessence, in the same way as Haggar's Komar. With help from the Garrison's IGF-Atlas, Voltron was able to destroy it. After recovering the pieces, the Garrison discovered the power source of the mech: a female Altean named Luka. Honerva has built more of these Robeasts which are piloted by her Altean acolytes infused with the strength of her dark entities.
- Honerva's Mecha – This is based on the Komar Robeasts, enhances her magic, and has wings that allow her to pierce the barrier between realities. She later merged her Robeast with the Sincline Mech to gain the comet ore that allows her to travel between realities. It is powerful enough to fight equally with the merged Voltron/Atlas mech.

=== Recurring ===
- Former Paladins or The Paladins of Old – The former pilots of Voltron, all of whom were leaders of their respective planets.
  - Emperor Zarkon – see Galra Empire
  - King Alfor (voiced by Keith Ferguson in season 1–2, Sean Teale in season 3) – The late King of Altea, husband of Queen Melenor, and father of Allura, Alfor gave into fear and chose to hide the Lions across the cosmos to prevent Zarkon from claiming them. He placed his daughter in suspended animation and left a digitized version of himself to guide Allura once she woke up. Alas his AI is corrupted by the energy of a Galran crystal, causing him to threaten the Paladins, Coran, and even Allura. With no choice, Allura disconnects her father's A.I. from its power source and loses her father forever. It is later revealed that Alfor was the former Paladin of the Red Lion, and alchemist for the Paladins.
  - Lady Trigel (voiced by Angie Harmon) – Former Paladin of the Green Lion from the Dalterion Belt.
  - Blaytz (voiced by Chris Kattan) – Former Paladin of the Blue Lion from Nalquod.
  - Gyrgan (voiced by Geno Segers) – Former Paladin of the Yellow Lion from Rygnirath. Known for saying "By Willow!" when surprised.
- Galaxy Garrison – military branch on Earth working to maintain peace. Upon Samuel Holt's return to Earth, the Garrison begins work on new projects by integrating Altean technology with Earth technology: Among them are the IGF-ATLAS spaceship and the Mecha-Flex-Exo or MFE-Ares fighters.
  - Admiral Ellen Sanda (voiced by Sumalee Montano) – Commander Iverson and Holt's superior. Sanda betrays the Garrison to the Galra, under the assumption that Sendak would leave. But after Sendak went back on his word, she dies in a desperate attempt to redeem herself.
  - Adam (voiced by Isaac Robinson-Smith) – Shiro's former boyfriend who died during the Galra invasion.
- The Altean Colonials: Alteans descended from Alteans who were off planet during Altea's destruction by Zarkon. When they received word of their home planet's destruction, many went into hiding using their shapeshifting to blend in with other races. Lotor found many of these survivors and created a hidden colony to hide their existence from Zarkon.
  - Romelle – see Atlas Crew
  - Bandor (voiced by Elan Garfias) – Romelle's little brother. Unlike Romelle, Bandor was fully devoted and loyal to Lotor like the rest of the Alteans in their colony. When he was chosen to join the second colony, Romelle pleaded with him not to go. He assured her he would be fine and gave her a secret communicator. However, Bandor discovered the truth behind the second colony and was able to escape and warn Romelle, before succumbing to his injuries.
  - Tavo (voiced by John DiMaggio) – A childhood friend of Romelle on the Altean colony, he was initially convinced by Honerva that the Voltron Coalition was evil and that Romelle was a traitor. After being captured by the Voltron coalition and nearly murdered by Honerva, Tavo realized that he was deceived. He elected to help the Coalition in their fight against Honerva.
  - Merla (voiced by Adelaide Clemens) – A female Altean who initially supported Honerva's efforts to eliminate the Voltron Coalition, she eventually rebelled against Honerva and assisted Voltron in their fight against Honerva's forces. She later assisted in rebuilding the Castle of Lions.
  - Luka (voiced by Kari Wahlgren) – A female Altean who was the "power source" for a mecha created by Honerva. She dies in the first episode of season 8.
- Arusians: a race of short, bipedal creatures with a vague resemblance to salamanders/snails exclusive to Legendary Defender.
  - The Arusian King (voiced by Neil Kaplan) – the ruler of Planet Arus who believes his people, the Arusians, angered the "Lion Goddess" after Voltron battles with Sendak's warship. brings Allura and the Voltron team to his village, who informs him that there is no angered goddess and after that, the King accepts her and the team as trusted allies.
  - Klaizap (voiced by Cree Summer) – an Arusian of Planet Arus and the self-proclaimed bravest of the Arusian warriors. He approaches the Castle of Lions to discover why the "Lion Goddess" is angry with his people, introducing Allura and the team to the nearby village over "Gazrel Hill", ruled by the Arusian King.
  - Moontow: is an Arusian of Planet Arus that lives in the village ruled by the Arusian King. She tries to appease the "Lion Goddess" by performing the Dance of Apology for Allura and the Voltron team.
- Balmerans – A race of humanoid creatures with reptilian features who live inside the Balmera, massive creatures that travel through space and produce powerful crystals employed by the Alteans and the Galra Empire for power, though the Alteans always imparted energy to the Balmera in exchange while the Galrans strip mined the Balmera for its resources. Hunk and Coran befriended a female Balmeran, Shay, and her family upon coming to their Balmera in search of a crystal, and would later return to rescue them from Galra oppression-befriending Shay's previously suspicious brother Rax, in the process-only for the Balmera to be attacked by a Robeast. Allura was able to heal the Balmera which encased the Robeast in crystal, only for it to escape later after Allura returned in search of an even larger crystal.
  - Shay (voiced by Emily Eiden) – a female Balmeran who helps Hunk and Coran escape the Galra and leave the Balmera with a new crystal for the Castle. When she allows herself to be captured so Hunk and Coran can escape, Hunk promises to return for her. When the Paladins arrive to liberate the Balmera, Shay is taken to the deepest caverns as bait to lure the Paladins into a trap. She was rescued and later helped Princess Allura to restore the Balmera. Following Earth's liberation, Shay traveled to the planet in order to visit Hunk as he recovered.
  - Rax (voiced by Scott Wolf) – Shay's older brother, who is reluctant to help Hunk and Coran due to not wanting any harm to be brought down upon his family. With this in mind, he alerts the Galra to Shay's plan to help Hunk and Coran in hopes of sparing her from punishment. Eventually, he has a change of heart and helps the Paladins when they return to liberate them and the Balmera from the Galra.
  - Shay's Father
  - Shay's Grandmother (voiced by Cree Summer)
- The Olkari: A race that adapted from machine to nature based technologies after their King, Lubos willingly sold out his people as slaves to live in comfort, by building a super-weapon for Zarkon's forces. While lead a liberalization on Olkarion with Team Voltron, later on The Olkari help Pidge to fully connect to the Green Lion in a way that allows her to summon a new weapon.
  - Ryner – see Voltron Coalition.
  - King Lubos (voiced by Fred Tatasciore) – Former King of Olkarion, Lubos willingly sold out his people to the Galra and helped them build the cube superweapon in exchange for comfortable living arrangements. He defended his actions by insisting that the Galra could not be defeated when his people insisted on fighting. Disappointed in their King, Ryner and the Olkarions denounce him as their ruler.
  - La-Sai (voiced by Ike Amadi) – An Olkari servant to King Lubos, who is disgusted with his King's betrayal of their people.
- Hunk's Mother (voiced by Zehra Fazal)
- Lance's Mother (voiced by Anna Graves)
- Xi (voiced by Robin Atkin Downes) – an alien held captive on Sendak's warship until he is freed by Shiro and Pidge along with a few other alien prisoners. He knows of Shiro from his days fighting in the gladiatorial games and refers to Shiro as "Champion". Although Xi found Shiro's display of feigned bloodlust terrifying back then, he now trusts Shiro completely. He helps Shiro begin to recollect his memories by telling him of what he witnessed, and provides some clue as to what happened to Pidge's father and brother.

=== Minor ===
- Merpeople
  - Queen Luxia (voiced by Kari Wahlgren) – The queen to a race of aquatic people, when her home's garden fell to a plant-like monster named Baku, Luxia became the first to be enthralled by the food it provided. She then assisted with the enslavement, gradually luring more and more of her people into its influence until the arrival of Lance and Hunk restored her free will and defeated the Baku.
  - Plaxum (voiced by Mae Whitman) – Plaxum is a mermaid-like alien who is exclusive to Legendary Defender, who helped Lance and Hunk. When a giant plant-like alien worm brainwashed Luxia and her people, she asked Lance to save them. Plaxum and her friends used a jellyfish to block the brainwashing power of the worm, not knowing that it was actually food provided by the worm that was inducing its hypnotic effect.
  - Florona (voiced by Alyson Stoner) – A mermaid servant of Queen Luxia. She is the one who finds Lance and Hunk and brings them to the Queen. When Lance is taken by the mermaid rebels, Luxia sentences Florona to the Baku Garden, where she is presumably devoured by the Baku Eel.
  - Blumfump (voiced by "Weird Al" Yankovic) – One of Plaxum's friends and a self-proclaimed scientist. He surmised that the Queen was brainwashing the mermaids and that the jellyfish could render them immune, but in reality it was the Baku Eel and the vegetation it produced which the mermaids had been using for food.
  - Swirn (voiced by Kari Wahlgren) – Another of Plaxum's friends.
- Baujal (voiced by Jim Cummings) – Leader of the Taujeerians.
- Unilu (voiced by Paul Reubens)
- General Hira (voiced by Virginia Madsen) – An Altean from another reality where Alteans defeated the Galra and rule the universe with technology that renders their subjects as mindless slaves.
- Sven (voiced by Josh Keaton) – Shiro's counterpart from another reality and a member of the Guns of Gamara.
- Te-osh (voiced by Lacey Chabert) – A rebel fighter who gives Pidge a transponder that will lead her to Matt before dying from her injuries.
- Queen Melenor (voiced by Kimberly Brooks) – Allura's late mother, wife of King Alfor.
- Ventar (voiced by Kari Wahlgren)
