= Sky Commanders =

- Title screen
- Genre: Adventure; Action; Science fiction Superhero
- Developed by: Jeff Segal
- Directed by: Ray Patterson
- Composer: Hoyt Curtin
- Countries of origin: United States; Japan
- Original language: English
- No. of episodes: 13

Production
- Executive producers: William Hanna; Joseph Barbera
- Producer: Kay Wright
- Editor: Gil Iverson
- Running time: 22 minutes
- Production companies: Hanna-Barbera Productions; Toei Animation

Original release
- Network: First-run syndication
- Release: July 5 – September 27, 1987

Sky Commanders is an American animated series co-produced by Hanna-Barbera and Toei Animation. It premiered in July 1987 as part of The Funtastic World of Hanna-Barbera and lasted for thirteen episodes. It was based on the action figure line from Kenner Toys.

== Plot ==
"Deep in the South Pacific, a tumultuous and untamed new continent has erupted. Spawned by a highly unstable new element, known as Theta Seven. If this powerful new element could be controlled, whoever possessed it would be the undisputed ruler of the world. One man, General Lucas Plague, is determined to hold that title. And it's up to a rugged team of mountaineering experts, led by commander Mike Summit to stop him. Employing revolutionary new gravity-lock and laser-cable technology to traverse the ever-changing terrain of the High Frontier, Mike Summit's Sky Commanders and General Plague's Raiders are locked in mortal combat with the fate of the entire world hanging in the balance!"

— opening narration

The storyline of Sky Commanders comprises the daily adventures of a multi-national group of soldiers and mountaineering specialists from all over the world who battle the evil General Lucas Plague and his goon squad of villainous mercenaries and miscreants, "The Raiders", whose aim is to seize control of the planet. The series is set on a new continent deep in the South Pacific, which was created by the emergence to the surface world of a new and powerful, unstable radioactive element, called "Theta Seven" (θ-7).

This lethal energy source can only be stabilized for containment by exposure to temperatures of −200 °F (−128.89 °C). It is known that whoever can control the element and harness its enormous power would be the ruler of the world, a goal that the amoral General Plague wants strongly. It is up to General Mike Summit and his highly trained soldiers to stop him.

Complicating the Sky Commanders' objective of stopping the criminal ambitions of the Raiders is the fact that the new continent (collectively referred to in the series as "The High Frontier") is routinely beset by sporadic, unstable and highly dangerous weather conditions and environmental hazards, such as landslides, earthquakes, cave-ins, whirlpools, etc. There is also the need for monthly shipments of fresh supplies, new advanced technology and weapon systems. Constant attack by the scheming and underhanded Raiders and the aforementioned environmental dangers make the Sky Commanders's mission only that much more dangerous.

Travel throughout the new continent is only possible by means of high-altitude flight, or by using Laser Cables, a specialized version of a rappelling cord emitted from combat backpacks worn by both Raider and Sky Commander. When used, the cables shoot out from the combat backpacks in the form of energy beams. When contact is made with a solid object, the Laser Cable solidifies into a solid metal cable line upon which travel is possible.

Theta Seven, the radioactive element that both sides fight to control, came from subterranean recesses of Earth. Its rise to the surface brought a new continent along with various creatures. These lifeforms are either the product of long-term exposure to Theta Seven's radiation or naturally occurring. Encounters with these creatures present an additional challenge for both sides in the conflict over the world's future.

== Characters ==
=== Sky Commanders ===
- Bob Ridgely as General Mike Summit, leader of the Sky Commanders
- William Windom as "Cutter" Kling, a man whose daughter is missing and is reportedly on the new continent.
- Soon-tek Oh as Kodiak, an Eskimo man
- Tristan Rogers as "Spider" Reilly, an Australian man
- Richard Doyle as "Books" Baxter, a Canadian man and electronics expert
- Dorian Harewood as Jim Stryker, a Jamaican man
- Lauren Tewes as Red McCullough, an Irish woman
- Darryl Hickman as R.J. Scott, the youngest Sky Commander

=== Raiders ===
- Bernard Erhard as General Lucas Plague, leader of the Raiders
- B. J. Ward as Dr. Erica Slade, the scientist of the Raiders
- Charlie Adler as Kreeg, the green-haired Raider
- Paul Eiding as Raider Rath, the black-haired Raider
- Dick Gautier as Mordax, the stout Raider and Plague's brother-in-law

== List of episodes ==
No.	Title	Written by	Original release date
1	"Assault on Raider Stronghold"	David Schwartz	July 5, 1987
2	"Back in the Fold"	Tony Zalewski and Kelly Ward	July 12, 1987
R. J. is brainwashed by Slade to take out his comrades.
3	"Fresh Recruit"	Don Glut and Kelly Ward	July 19, 1987
4	"Marooned"	Don Glut and Kelly Ward	July 26, 1987
Books and Kodiak look for ways through a very windy part of the continent.
5	"Divide and Conquer"	Mark Cassutt	August 2, 1987
6	"One on One"	Tony Marino and Kelly Ward	August 9, 1987
7	"Rescuers Need Rescuing"	John Bates	August 16, 1987
8	"Terminal Temblor"	Jack Hudock	August 23, 1987
9	"S.O.S."	Andrew Yates	August 30, 1987
The Raiders find a ship that ran aground years ago but is still populated. They trick the populace into allying with them.
10	"Turncoat"	David Schwartz	September 6, 1987
11	"Deep Freeze"	Mark Cassutt	September 13, 1987
12	"Firestorm"	Tony Zalewski and Eric Lewald	September 20, 1987
The battle of the two teams results in a powerful rock sinking into ground which may cause the planet to explode. Thus the Raiders are compelled to ally with the Sky Commanders.
13	"The Agony of Defeat"	Jack Hudock and Kelly Ward	September 27, 1987

== Home media ==
Warner Archive released Sky Commanders: The Complete Series on DVD in region 1 on August 28, 2012 as part of their Hanna-Barbera Classic Collection. This is a Manufacture-on-Demand (MOD) release, available exclusively through Warner's online store and Amazon.com.

== See also ==
- Lists of animated television series
