= I Yabba-Dabba Do! =

- Genre: Comedy
- Written by: Rich Fogel; Mark Seidenberg
- Directed by: William Hanna
- Voices of: Henry Corden; Jean Vander Pyl; Megan Mullally; Frank Welker; B.J. Ward; Jerry Houser; Janet Waldo; John Stephenson
- Composer: John Debney
- Country of origin: United States

Production
- Executive producers: William Hanna; Joseph Barbera
- Producer: Iwao Takamoto
- Running time: 92 minutes
- Production company: H-B Production Co.

Original release
- Network: ABC
- Release: February 7, 1993

Related
- The Flintstone Kids' "Just Say No" Special; Hollyrock-a-Bye Baby

I Yabba-Dabba Do! is a 1993 American animated romantic comedy made-for-television film based on the 1960s animated series, The Flintstones and is a continuation of the series’ spin-off, The Pebbles and Bamm-Bamm Show. It premiered on ABC on February 7, 1993.

== Plot ==
Pebbles (who currently works for an ad agency) and Bamm-Bamm (who currently works in a car repair shop) decided to get married after Bamm-Bamm proposes with a poem in the middle of the street (after Pebbles mistakenly thinks he was trying to dump her when Bamm-Bamm read her a letter that started "Dear Pebbles"). However, Fred loses his family savings when he bets it on his team, the Bedrock Brontos, who lost on a game. Fred tries to secretly earn more money to pay for the wedding and replace the savings before Wilma learns about it. Fred tried to compensate the loss by applying for a loan in the bank but gets rejected because of his bad credit score. He even tried asking for a raise from Mr. Slate, but ends up being dismissed from his job because of his violent temper that got Mr. Slate injured previously.

Fred enlists Barney's help in earning more money for the wedding, but this failed as Fred lost Barney's family savings to a real estate con artist. Even when the con artist ends up being caught and arrested, the authorities refused to return Barney's savings as they submitted it as evidence, leaving Barney broke and putting both him and Fred in bigger debt. Meanwhile, Wilma's mother Pearl Slaghoople arrives to help with the wedding, but the families got into an argument after Fred humiliates Barney during Bamm-Bamm's bachelor party, and Pebbles and Bamm-Bamm decided to elope in Rock Vegas after being fed up with their parents' behavior. Fed up with Fred's actions, Barney breaks off his friendship with Fred, but not before he angrily reveals the truth about what Fred did with the Flintstones and Rubbles' savings. Wilma then angrily confronts Fred about it, Fred tries to blame Barney at first, but Barney and Betty leave Fred and Wilma to argue about it themselves. Wilma and Pearl then blame Fred for not only losing the money on the bet he made but for Pebbles and Bamm-Bamm for getting married in Rock Vegas. Wilma then realizes that marrying Fred was the biggest mistake of her life and kicks Fred out saying she doesn't want him in her life anymore. Fred tries to get back in to explain everything to Wilma but Wilma refuses to let him in, even Dino refuses to be with Fred. When Fred slips on one of Pebbles' old roller skates, he realizes he can go to Rock Vegas to get Pebbles and Bamm-Bamm back to Bedrock for the Wedding. So, he apologizes to Wilma, Barney and Betty which they forgive him.

Fred and Barney travel to Rock Vegas looking for Pebbles and Bamm-Bamm. They stop at a casino where Barney wins money through a big wheel game. They are attacked by a group of crooks known as the Wedding Whackers after mistaking them for Pebbles and Bamm-Bamm getting married and took a photo of them robbing a newlywed couple. Shortly afterwards, they are rescued by Bamm-Bamm and Pebbles. During the chase, the photo of the Wedding Whackers is destroyed, so the four are captured as suspects of being the Wedding Whackers, along with the real ones.

While in detainment, Fred reveals all the trouble he has gone through to try to help Pebbles with her wedding ceremony, which leads the Wedding Whackers to confess to their crimes, thus resulting the release of Fred, Barney, Pebbles and Bamm-Bamm. The Rock Vegas Casino shows up at the jail with Barney's winnings. Barney decides to give half of his winnings to Fred so he can pay for the wedding and pay off the debts. Pebbles and Bamm-Bamm returns to Bedrock and get married, with Fred, Barney, Dino, Wilma and Betty as the happy ones seeing them getting married. Fred also gets his job back from Mr. Slate and is given a raise after being invited to the wedding even "William Hanna" and "Joseph Barbera" attend the wedding as well as the Rock Vegas police who escorted them back to Bedrock. At the end, Pebbles and Bamm-Bamm reveal they are moving to Hollyrock, and Barney stated that he's giving them the remainder of the Rock Vegas winnings to pay for their expenses. However, Fred gets angry with Barney for this and they start to fight again, much to the families' distraught.

== Voice cast ==
- Henry Corden as Fred Flintstone
- Frank Welker as Barney Rubble and Dino
- Jean Vander Pyl as Wilma Flintstone and Martha Slate
- B.J. Ward as Betty Rubble
- Janet Waldo as Pearl Slaghoople & Additional Voices
- Megan Mullally as Pebbles Flintstone-Rubble
- Jerry Houser as Bamm-Bamm Rubble
- John Stephenson as Mr. Slate
- Joseph Barbera as Himself
- William Hanna as Himself
- Darryl Phinnessee as Wedding Reception Singer/Piano Player singing "I Yabba Dabba Do"
- Randy Crenshaw as The Lodge Patron #2, The Mammoth
- Henry Polic II as the Seagull Writer

== Nielsen ratings ==
The film brought in a 12.4/19 rating/share in its original airing and was watched by 22 million viewers. The film came in second place in its timeslot, and ranking 35th out of 94 programs that week.

== Home media ==
Cartoon Network, in association with Turner Home Video, released the movie on VHS on January 14, 1997. Then Warner Home Video released it on April 21, 1998, and again in 1999 and 2000, but they are now out of print. On October 9, 2012, Warner Archive released The Flintstones- I Yabba-Dabba Do! on DVD in region 1 as part of their Hanna–Barbera Classics Collection. This is a Manufacture-on-Demand (MOD) release, available through Warner's online store, Amazon.com and Wal-Mart.com.

On August 4, 2020, Warner Bros. Home Entertainment gave it its first wide release as part of the DVD collection The Flintstones: 2 Movies & 5 Specials.

== Syndication ==
This spinoff movie has aired on Cartoon Network in the 1990s, then ran on Boomerang in the 2000s.

== Sequel ==
Hollyrock-a-Bye Baby was released in 1993. The sequel is considered very difficult to syndicate after its original broadcast and the attempt at releasing it on home media was delayed until 2012, mainly due to the involved suggestive material relating to child birth. However, it eventually aired on Cartoon Network and Boomerang usually as part of Mother's Day special programming in the early 2000s.
