= Shirogane =

Shirogane may refer to:

== Places ==
- Shirokane, a district of Minato, Tokyo, Japan
- Shirogane Station, a station on the Japanese Government Railways

== Characters ==
- Shirogane, a character from the manga series Ayakashi Triangle
- Shirogane, the battle puppeteers from the manga series Karakuri Circus
- Shirogane, a character from the manga series Monochrome Factor
- Shirogane, a character in the video game series Mugen Souls
- Shirogane Luna (Luna Platz), a character from the video game series Mega Man Star Force
- Himeko Shirogane, a character from the anime series Powerpuff Girls Z
- Miyuki Shirogane, a character from the manga series Kaguya-sama: Love Is War
- Naoto Shirogane, a detective from the video game Persona 4
- Ryou Shirogane, a character from the manga series Tokyo Mew Mew
- Takashi and Ryou Shirogane, characters from the anime series Beast King GoLion and Voltron: Legendary Defender
- Tsumugi Shirogane, a character from the video game Danganronpa V3: Killing Harmony

== Miscellaneous ==
- "Shirogane" (song), 2021 song by Lisa
- Shirogane Noel, Japanese VTuber
