= Kenpachi Zaraki =

Fictional character from Bleach

- Kenpachi Zaraki as depicted on the cover for Volume 13
- First appearance: Bleach chapter 65: Collisions (2002)
- Created by: Tite Kubo
- Voiced by: Fumihiko Tachiki (Japanese); David Lodge (English, Ep. 20–243 and animated films); Patrick Seitz (English, Ep. 244–present)

In-universe information
- Title: Captain of the 11th Division Kenpachi

Kenpachi Zaraki (Japanese: 更木 剣八, Hepburn: Zaraki Kenpachi) is a fictional supporting character in the anime and manga series Bleach created by Tite Kubo. He is the captain of the 11th Division within the Gotei 13. His lieutenant is Yachiru Kusajishi.

== Character outline ==
Kenpachi has a wild and aggressive appearance, fitting with his personality. He wears his captain's jacket without sleeves, and with a more ragged look to it. He acquired his Haori from the previous 11th Division captain, whom he defeated and killed in a duel in order to become captain. He styles his hair into liberty spikes with bells at the tips, which, Tite Kubo has remarked, makes his hair one of the most difficult to draw in the series. He also wears a special eyepatch on his right eye lined with a strange creatures mouths; the eyepatch was created by the 12th Division. It absorbs the bulk of his power. Both of these are meant to give enemies an advantage, similar to his habit of fighting one-handed, since in an unhandicapped state he would defeat them so quickly that he would not be able to enjoy himself sufficiently to delve into a state of bloodlust, that being what he treasures most. He has a huge scar on the left side of his face, which was given to him as a child from his first ever battle with Retsu Unohana.

Despite his initial introduction as a lethal foe, Zaraki later begins to play the role of the antihero in Bleach: though still self-centered and violent, his actions tend to be for the best and his relationship with his division and others. This shift is primarily centered around his appearances in the Bleach anime and omake stories, with the exception of the occasional diatribe between himself and Yachiru. He is depicted as having a very poor sense of direction, and is often depicted in omake stories asking his lieutenant Yachiru for directions to a particular place (who then randomly points in a direction even though she herself has a terrible sense of direction as well).

Kenpachi lives for battle (evidenced by his method of attaining his rank) and enjoys a good fight more than anything. He restrains himself in battle in order to prolong and savor the fight. Kenpachi believes that injury and death are nothing more than the price one pays for a good fight. Despite his squad's reputation as the most bloodthirsty of the Gotei 13, they have their own code of ethics, different from the set rules of Soul Society, fitting with Zaraki's portrayal as a free spirit. On various occasions, Kenpachi is seen putting fun before work. Despite his violent tendencies, Zaraki will usually give up on a fight if his opponent is too injured to fight back, claiming that the fight is no longer fun. However, he will unhesitatingly kill his opponent if they refuse to end their fight on his terms as seen during his battles with Tōsen and Nnoitora.

== History ==
Kenpachi before becoming a captain

Prior to entering the Soul Reaper ranks, Zaraki resided in District 80, the most lawless district surrounding the Soul Society. He became very proficient with swordsmanship, or at least fighting, while he was there, and eventually adopted the district's name, "Zaraki", as his surname. He also took a Zanpakutō still in its "Asauchi" state from a corpse and made the weapon his own, though unable to hear its spiritual embodiment. During that time, he met a kindred spirit in Squad 4's Retsu "Yachiru" Unohana, both leaving their opponent with a scar during their duel. After leaving the district he found a small girl who, despite her young age, did not fear his sword. Since she had no name, unaware that she is actually a manifestation of his Zanpakutō, Zaraki named her "Yachiru" after Unohana while christening himself "Kenpachi", Unohana's title which has been associated with one who has killed many. Yachiru became inseparable from Zaraki from that point further, following him wherever he went, usually clinging to his back.

After some time had passed, Kenpachi found his way into Soul Society and killed the previous captain of the 11th Division, thus gaining his seat in the Gotei 13. As a new captain, Zaraki was begrudgingly forced to learn Kendo, something he hated because it personified his skills, although he did agree on one point: a blade swung with both arms is more powerful than with one arm, such as he made it a point to avoid using it in battle in order to prolong the experience of fighting as long as possible.

In an interview, Tite Kubo noted that he would like to go into more depth about Zaraki.

== Plot overview ==
After Ichigo Kurosaki and his friends arrive in Soul Society, Zaraki begins to hunt for the strongest fighter in their group before finding Ichigo. After a short skirmish, Zaraki stabs Ichigo's sword while stabbing him in the chest, seemingly killing him. as Kenpachi begins to walk away, when Ichigo stands up again, healed by the power of Zangetsu. During the fight, Ichigo becomes enough of a challenge that Zaraki removes his eyepatch, thus releasing the extra power it has been devouring. As they rush at each other, the exchange itself ends in a draw, with Ichigo falling first and Zaraki shortly after, both admitting defeat (though Zaraki's sword breaks in the end, after it is deflected by the sudden manifestation of Ichigo's hollow mask, which spared the latter from death). Zaraki later admits that he lost, but he needs to get stronger and pay Ichigo back. He finds himself happy he found someone strong to fight, before falling unconscious. He then decides to help Ichigo and frees his friends from imprisonment. Much later on, while searching for Ichigo with his friends in tow, they are headed off by 7th and 9th Division members. Zaraki battles their captains Sajin Komamura and Kaname Tōsen respectively, defeating Tōsen and fighting off Komamura before Komamura runs away to find Shigekuni Yamamoto Genryūsai. He does not see Ichigo and his friends off when they leave the Soul Society. He tells Yachiru that he and Ichigo will certainly meet again because they are the only ones who are what they seem to be. Kenpachi also helps fight off the Bount invasion and successfully defeats Maki Ichinose, a former member of his own squad who left after Kenpachi killed the former captain.

During the Arrancar arc, Zaraki appears to Ichigo as his instinct and desire to win, explaining to him that they were both the type of people who live to fight (or fight to live) battle after battle. After Orihime is taken to Hueco Mundo, Zaraki arrives with Byakuya Kuchiki to retrieve Tōshirō Hitsugaya's group and bring them back to Soul Society. Later, in Hueco Mundo, Kenpachi comes to Ichigo's aid during his battle with Nnoitra's Fracción Tesla, dealing the Arrancar a mortal blow with a single strike and then engaging the Espada Nnoitra in battle. Despite having "more fun than he has had in a long time," he suffers enough injuries to realize that he may die if the fight continues. Kenpachi begins to have a few flashbacks to his Kendo training as he would grip his sword with two hands to deal Nnoitra a vicious, incapacitating blow. Unfortunately for Nnoitra during the ensuing fight Zaraki's eye-patch, which is a special seal that strongly 'consumes' his Spirit Pressure (this way battles will last longer allowing him to have more fun), is cut off allowing Kenpachi to fight at full power. When Nnoitra refuses to accept defeat and charges Kenpachi, the latter kills him with another strike. Zaraki then stands over Nnoitra's corpse, telling him their battle "was a blast". He later appears to save Ichigo from the Cero Espada Yammy by cutting off one of his legs, and further engaging him in combat with Byakuya Kuchiki. When it seems that Kenpachi and Byakuya are about to defeat him, Yammy undergoes a new transformation. as Byakuya and Zaraki ultimately defeat their opponent, though Kenpachi thought the fight was quite "boring". He is last seen being reprimanded by the Captain-Commander for losing his captain's haori in battle.

Seventeen months after the fight with Sōsuke Aizen, Kenpachi, along with all the other high-ranking members of the Gotei 13, are ordered to restore Ichigo's reiatsu. as he arrives with Byakuya, Hitsugaya, Ikkaku, Rukia, and Renji to aid in fighting Xcution. Kenpachi is engaged by Giriko Kutsuzawa and quickly slices the Fullbringer in half, finding him "boring".

After these events, a group of Quincy called the Wandenreich appear and send their invading force of Sternritters to take over Soul Society. Zaraki manages to single-handedly kill Berenice Gabrielli, Jerome Quizbatt, and Loyd Lloyd without much difficulty. Kenpachi then confronts Yhwach, who is revealed to be Loyd's twin brother Royd Lloyd in disguise, and is defeated. After the Wandenreich leaves, Zaraki recovers and engages Unohana in what both expect to be a fight to the death in order to train him in dealing with the Wandenreich. Despite being brought to the brink of death several times, and Captain Unohana finally releasing her Bankai, Zaraki ultimately cuts down Unohana, subsequently hearing his Zanpakutō and learning its name: Nozarashi (野晒; Weather-Beaten One). During the Wandenreich's second invasion, Zaraki uses Nozarashi's ax-like Shikai form against the Sternritter Gremmy Thoumeaux in an exhausting flight that leaves him at the mercy of a quartet of female Sternritters before Ichigo saves him. After being healed twice, the second time being a consequence of being incapacitated while fighting Pernida, Zaraki joins Hitsugaya and Byakuya against Gerard. During the fight, as Yachiru reveals her true identity and sacrifices herself to awaken his full power, Zaraki manifests his Zanpakutō's Bankai form to overwhelm the Sternritter before his body begins to suffer from the strain caused by using the Bankai. He later helps in holding down Gerard for Hitsugaya and Byakuya to land the death blow. Ten years after the war, having become more composed with Ikkaku as his new vice-captain, Zaraki is last seen getting himself lost while attempting to attend Rukia's captain ceremony.

== Appearances in other media ==
Zaraki appears in the second session of Bleach: Beat Collection, together with Yachiru, Ikkaku, and Yumichika. He has a minor role in the Bleach OVA, and also appears briefly in Bleach: Memories of Nobody, making sport of one of the Dark Ones. He also appears in the second movie, being the first to charge in and attack Sōjirō's new dragon form; he helps out in the final battle as well. In the third movie, he fought an altered Mayuri Kurotsuchi and was consumed by white substance that immobilized him for much of the movie. He was finally released in a fashion and aids in the final battle. Kenpachi also appears in most of the Bleach video games. He also appears in four of the Rock Musical Bleach performances: Dark of the Bleeding Moon, No Clouds in the Blue Heavens, The All, and Live Bankai Show Code 002. He is portrayed by Shōgo Suzuki.

== Reception ==
Kenpachi's love for battles has made the fights he appears in enjoyable for various critics. Calling him the "toughest Soul Reaper in business," IGN comments that "any battle with Kenpachi is always fun to watch just because of the fact that he has so much fun in his battles" and adds "almost every battle seems lopsided in Kenpachi's favor due to the fact that Kenpachi enjoys the battle all the way through". OtakuKart named him the "5th Strongest Captain in Bleach", stating "This guy is total monster who does not even use his Shikai but with bare sword and immense spiritual pressure he was able to defeat Nnoitra. Otaku Nuts ranked him as the "Top 5th Anime Character That Rocks", "Top 4th Anime Anti-Hero", "Top 2nd Best Bleach Character", and his Nozarashi as the "Top 8th Zanpakuto". HubPages ranked him as the "10th Coolest Male Anime Character" with comments "What makes Kenpachi cool? His overwhelming strength, power, aggressive fighting style, and Yachiru by his side." In IGN article "5 Anime Bad Boys I Always Root For", Kenpachi was placed on 5th place, with comment "It doesn't matter what side Kenpachi is on at any moment- his fights are always sure to entertain." In another article "Top Ten Anime Characters", Kenpachi ranked 9th, with comment "Practically a super saiyen, Kenpachi is an awesome swordsmen who brings out some of the best animated sword fighting because of his lack of a technique." The Robot's Voice named Kenpachi as one of "10 Bleach Characters Far More Interesting Than Ichigo", commenting "This character pretty much defines the anime trope of brutal badass. He just slashes the shit out of whatever gets in his way, which we highly recommend against doing." In Honey's Anime pool "Top 10 Ridiculous Anime Hairstyles", Kenpachi's hairstyle came at 6th place. The same site also ranked his fight with Nnoitra Gilga as the "7th best anime battle/fight", where they stated "If you've been watching Bleach long enough, Kenpachi wasn't given the time to show off his true power. This battle finally showed what he's capable of and while the animation weren't that good, the fight showed us what Kenpachi is truly capable of." Orzzzz named Kenpachi as one of the "Anime Characters Who Should Sue Their Stylists" and also ranked him as the "6th Strongest Anime Character Who is Master of Sword", and as the "3rd Most Overpowered Anime Character Who Can Do Something Devastating", calling him "the hardest, strongest, most fanatically combatant of all the Shinigami." Screen Rant ranked Kenpachi as the "4th Strongest Shinigami", where they commented "His Bankai transforms him into a demon with unparalleled physical abilities in exchange for his sense of reason. His love of combat often leads to his defeat, but Kenpachi is doubtlessly one of the strongest Shinigami in Bleach."
