= Ayakashi Triangle =

Japanese manga series by Kentaro Yabuki

- First tankōbon volume cover, featuring Matsuri Kazamaki (right) and Suzu Kanade

あやかしトライアングル (Ayakashi Toraianguru)
- Genre: Fantasy; Romantic comedy
- Manga
- Written by: Kentaro Yabuki
- Published by: Shueisha
- English publisher: NA: Seven Seas Entertainment; Viz Media (Note: Digital only, up to chapter 88)
- Imprint: Jump Comics
- Magazine: Weekly Shōnen Jump; (June 15, 2020 – April 18, 2022); Shōnen Jump+; (April 25, 2022 – September 25, 2023)
- Original run: June 15, 2020 – September 25, 2023
- Volumes: 16
- Anime television series
- Directed by: Noriaki Akitaya
- Written by: Shogo Yasukawa
- Music by: Rei Ishizuka
- Studio: Connect
- Licensed by: Crunchyroll
- Original network: GYT, GTV, BS11, Tokyo MX, TV Aichi, ytv, AT-X
- Original run: January 10, 2023 – September 26, 2023
- Episodes: 12
- icon

Ayakashi Triangle (Japanese: あやかしトライアングル, Hepburn: Ayakashi Toraianguru), sometimes abbreviated as AyaTri (あやトラ, Ayatora), is a Japanese fantasy romantic comedy manga series written and illustrated by Kentaro Yabuki. It was serialized in publisher Shueisha's Weekly Shōnen Jump magazine from June 2020 to April 2022, and was transferred to the Shōnen Jump+ website where it continued until September 2023. Shueisha has collected and published its individual chapters into sixteen tankōbon volumes. The manga has been licensed for English release in North America by Seven Seas Entertainment, and Shueisha also simultaneously publishes the series in English and Spanish for free on the Manga Plus app and website. An anime television series adaptation by Connect aired from January to September 2023.

Ayakashi Triangle focuses on exorcist ninja Matsuri Kazamaki, as he tries to defend his childhood friend and love interest, the beautiful Ayakashi Medium Suzu Kanade, from evil spirits called ayakashi. However, during a battle to save Suzu's life, Matsuri is turned into an attractive silver-haired girl after being cursed by Shirogane, the King of Ayakashi. With no apparent way to reverse the transformation, Matsuri is forced to live publicly as a girl in the foreseeable future as he and Suzu deal with both the friendly and the malicious ayakashi they encounter as well as their growing romantic feelings for each other, all while trying to break Matsuri's curse for him to return to his original male form.

== Synopsis ==
=== Setting ===
The story of Ayakashi Triangle takes place in the fictional Omiko City (小美呼市, Omiko-shi), located in the countryside of Japan.^{Ch. 2} Unbeknownst to its citizens, Omiko is also populated by ayakashi (妖) (Note: In the manga, the term 'ayakashi', despite being Japanese, applies to spirits from all over the world, not just those native to Japan.), spirits that are invisible to most people. The few individuals able to see ayakashi are those who possess a large amount of at least one of the two energies that humans are composed of: haku (ハク), the life energy, and kon (コン), the spiritual energy. An example of such is the Ayakashi Medium (妖巫女, Ayakashi Miko), a rare type of human who over-secretes haku, the energy from which ayakashi are entirely made of; for this reason, the Ayakashi Medium is worshiped by the majority of ayakashi as a deity-like figure.^{Ch. 14}

Although ayakashi in general are amicable and pacific towards humans, there are malicious and wicked ayakashi that endanger their lives.^{Ch. 1} To counter the threat they pose as well as to protect the public from dangerous ayakashi, clans exist that consist entirely of exorcist ninja whose strengthened kon allows them to perform jutsu and other extraordinary feats.^{Ch. 25} These clans work directly under the Exorcist Ninja Association, a secret organization founded by the government of Japan hundreds of years prior to the start of the series.^{Ch. 13} The Association supplies local agents across the country with knowledge about ayakashi, training to combat them, and special equipment; this last one is provided by tool shops that also double as regular stores for the wider community.^{Ch. 15}

=== Premise ===
Matsuri Kazamaki and Suzu Kanade are childhood friends with long-standing crushes on each other who share the ability to see ayakashi. While Matsuri is descendant of a line of exorcist ninja who protect people from evil ayakashi, Suzu is an Ayakashi Medium whose power draws many ayakashi to her. However, Matsuri learns Suzu's growing power will inevitably bring ayakashi to try to devour her to get more power, so he decides to protect Suzu by exorcising the evil ayakashi that approach her. Years later, on the day before the pair were to start high school, Suzu is attacked by Shirogane, the King of Ayakashi (妖の王, Ayakashi no Ō), but is saved by Matsuri. Unable to beat him, Matsuri seals away most of his powers into a scroll, but before he does, Shirogane puts a curse on Matsuri that turns him into a girl, hoping the transformation will ruin any chance he and Suzu have of becoming a couple in the future. As Suzu helps Matsuri to adjust to his new life as a girl, Shirogane plots to regain his power and devour Suzu.

== Production ==
Cover page of Leo × Leo, which served as an influence for Kentaro Yabuki in the plot development of Ayakashi Triangle.

=== Concept and creation ===
In 2019, manga artist Kentaro Yabuki published the one-shot manga Leo × Leo in the 11th issue of Weekly Shōnen Jump on February 9, as part of the magazine's "J Romcom Festival!" for Valentine's Day celebrations. This one-shot would later be used by Yabuki as a source of inspiration for him to create Ayakashi Triangle, with the manga featuring a premise similar to that of Leo × Leo, although there was no ayakashi in the one-shot, a significant difference that would only be shown in the manga. Leo × Leo focused on a normal high school student named Fuka and her childhood friend Leo a martial artist boy who is magically gender-swapped into a girl by his father; Yabuki reused the characteristics of both characters, including their personalities and designs, to conceive the main protagonists of Ayakashi Triangle, Matsuri Kazamaki and Suzu Kanade.

In May 2021, Yabuki commented that when he created the primary setting of Ayakashi Triangle, Omiko City, he modeled the designs of the scenario after an unspecified area near Odawara, located in Kanagawa Prefecture.

=== Development ===
In Ayakashi Triangle, one of the most outstanding elements present in its plot is the constant display of female nudity (male nudity is also seen, but rarely in comparison to female), as in the 37th chapter of the manga, in which Suzu is initially seen taking a shower and spends the entire chapter naked, with special focus dedicated to her body.^{Ch. 37} Other elements observed are the use of panty shots (panchira), revealing or sexualized clothing, groping, and other representative cases of sexual overtones that can be considered as ecchi or as qualifiers for anything related to erotic and simply content. In digitally released chapters, the intimate parts of the female characters' bodies, such as the vagina and nipples, are censored. However, the printed volumes of the manga show the latter exposed and in detail.

The previously mentioned elements of Ayakashi Triangle are commonly associated with Yabuki's works, especially his earlier manga series Black Cat (2000–2004), To Love Ru (2006–2009), and the latter's continuation To Love Ru Darkness (2010–2017); the first series was created solely by Yabuki, while the last two manga were only illustrated by him, with writer Saki Hasemi as co-creator of the To Love Ru franchise alongside Yabuki. Unlike To Love Ru, the sexual content seen in Ayakashi Triangle is less explicit and prominent than its own, due to the fan service not being one of the main focuses of the manga as it was in To Love Ru, although the graphic and sexual intensity of many scenes in Ayakashi Triangle is still higher when compared to other manga series. Furthermore, the occasional cameo appearances of To Love Ru characters in Ayakashi Triangle confirm that the two series coexist in the same fictional universe. For instance, the character Run Elise Jewelria (who has the ability to gender-swap identical to Matsuri) makes a brief appearance in the 4th chapter of Ayakashi Triangle, and Kyouko Kirisaki is indirectly alluded to in the 8th chapter of the manga.

=== Cultural references ===
Ayakashi Triangle is notable for focusing on legendary creatures that are notable in Japanese folklore and mythology, with the aforementioned ayakashi as the central point of the series. In legends, ayakashi are yōkai that appear above the surface of some body of water, whereas in the manga, ayakashi is the collective name to refer to the variety of spirits that inhabit the world, in addition to having subspecies such as the tsukumogami, a type of ayakashi that take over inanimate objects. A secondary focus in Ayakashi Triangle is Japanese culture. An exemplification of this is how some of the manga's drawings pay homage to the classic style of Japanese art. Another case worthy of observation is that Matsuri is constantly seen wearing a fundoshi (in both his male and female forms), which is a traditional Japanese undergarment for adult men.

Up until the 35th chapter of Ayakashi Triangle, the manga had a predominant emphasis on mythological figures from Japanese folklore. As of the 36th chapter, the series started to address supernatural beings from other cultures, with the character Rochka being the first non-Japanese creature seen in Ayakashi Triangle. Rochka, whose name is an abbreviation for Snegurochka, is generally depicted in Russian fairy tales as the embodiment of winter and the granddaughter of Ded Moroz. Described as a "magical Russian loli", she is believed to be the Russian equivalent of Yuki-onna, yōkai that appear as beautiful women in icy, snowy or mountainous regions.

== Themes and analysis ==
The series' main theme is about sexual orientation, and how the romantic attraction that one person feels for another is unrelated to their sex or gender. In Ayakashi Triangle, this is addressed mainly in the interactions between Matsuri and Suzu; the latter's behavior in the manga strongly reflects that of someone who is uncertain of their sexual preferences, as Suzu constantly questions herself in several chapters of the series if it is acceptable for her to pursue a relationship with Matsuri, regardless of whether or not they are of the same sex. Also, Matsuri is forced to examine his romantic interest for the same sex, a situation analogous to that of a person who suddenly realizes that they have feelings for someone of the same gender. The above theme coincides with Yabuki's statement in July 2020 that he plans to include various "relationship triangles" in the manga that go beyond just romance.

== Publication ==
Ayakashi Triangle, written and illustrated by Kentaro Yabuki, started in Shueisha's shōnen manga magazine Weekly Shōnen Jump on June 15, 2020. The series finished in the magazine on April 18, 2022, and was transferred to the Shōnen Jump+ website starting on April 25 of the same year. It ended its serialization on September 25, 2023. Shueisha has collected its chapters into individual tankōbon volumes. Sixteen volumes were released from October 2, 2020, to December 4, 2023.

Ayakashi Triangle has been licensed for simultaneous publication in North America as it is released in Japan, with its chapters being digitally launched by Viz Media on its Shonen Jump website. Shueisha also simultaneously publishes the series translated into both English and Spanish languages for free on the Manga Plus app and website. In January 2022, both Manga Plus and Viz Media's Shonen Jump revealed that they would not publish the series' 74th and 75th chapters. Viz Media retired the book volumes for purchase from their website. In March 2022, Seven Seas Entertainment announced that they had licensed the manga and will release it in uncut print and digital formats.

=== Volumes ===
No.	Original release date	Original ISBN	English release date	English ISBN
1	October 2, 2020	978-4-08-882505-2	November 1, 2022	978-1-68579-665-5
1. "Matsuri, Suzu, and the Ayakashi" (祭里とすずと妖, Matsuri to Suzu to Ayakashi); 2. "Girl Friend" (オンナトモダチ, Onna Tomodachi); 3. "I Just Can't Accept That" (納得できない, Nattoku Dekinai); 4. "When You Were Young" (幼心の君, Yōshin no Kimi); 5. "The Lightning-Fast Exorcist Ninja" (神速の祓忍, Shinsoku no Harainin); 6. "Kachofugetsu" (花鳥風月, Kachōfūgetsu; lit. "flower-birds-wind-moon"); 7. "The Melancholy of the Ayakashi Medium" (妖巫女の憂鬱, Ayakashi Miko no Yūutsu); Bonus Story. "Matsuri's Undies" (祭里のパンツ, Matsuri no Pantsu)
2	December 4, 2020	978-4-08-882516-8	February 7, 2023	978-1-68579-666-2
8. "Omokage Shadow" (オモカゲ, Omokage); 9. "A Special Relationship" (トクベツな関係, Tokubetsu na Kankei); 10. "Those Who Can See, and Those Who Can't" (視える、視えない, Mieru, Mienai); 11. "The Shape of the Spirit" (精神の形, Seishin no Katachi); 12. "Utagawa Garaku" (歌川画楽, Utagawa Garaku); 13. "A Sign of the Awakening" (覚醒の兆し, Kakusei no Kizashi); 14. "Inside Matsuri" (祭里の中に, Matsuri no Naka ni); 15. "Exorcist Ninja Tool Shop" (祓忍具屋, Harainingu-ya); 16. "Her First" (初めてのひと, Hajimete no Hito); Bonus Story. "Better Living Thru Matsuri" (一家に一台 祭里ちゃん, Ikka ni Ichidai Matsuri-chan)
3	March 4, 2021	978-4-08-882582-3	April 25, 2023	978-1-68579-667-9
17. "The Enticing Boy" (誘う少年, Izanau Shōnen); 18. "Hinojiki Sosuke the Jinyo" (人妖・日喰想介, Jin'yō Hinojiki Sōsuke); 19. "Matsuri vs. Jinyo, and Then..." (祭里VS人妖 そして..., Matsuri tai Jin'yō, Soshite...); 20. "Shirogane's Thoughts" (シロガネの想い, Shirogane no Omoi); 21. "The Spirit of Harmony" (調和の心, Chōwa no Kokoro); 22. "The Gift of Constant Change" (流転の賜物, Ruten no Tamamono); 23. "Kanade Suzu, the King of Ayakashi" (妖の王、花奏すず, Ayakashi no Ō, Kanade Suzu); 24. "The Ayakashi's Lost Property" (妖の落しもの, Ayakashi no Otoshimono); 25. "The Lightning-Fast Father" (神速の親父, Shinsoku no Oyaji); Bonus Story. "GO! Ayakashi Pirates" (GO! あやかし海賊団!!, Gō! Ayakashi Kaizoku-dan!!)
4	June 4, 2021	978-4-08-882682-0	July 25, 2023	978-1-68579-668-6
26. "An Encounter With 'Him'?" ("彼"との遭遇?, 'Kare' to no Sōgū?); 27. "Exorcising Incense" (祓香, Haraikō); 28. "Nostalgic Home" (ノスタルジック・ホーム, Nosutarujikku Hōmu); 29. "Lament of the Former King of Ayakashi" (元・妖の王の嘆き, Moto Ayakashi no Ō no Nageki); 30. "Follow Garaku!" (画楽を追え！, Garaku o Oe!); 31. "Chirizuka Kaiou" (塵塚怪王, Chirizuka Kaiō); 32. "Hirasaka Mei" (比良坂命依, Hirasaka Mei); 33. "A Distraught Matsuri" (困惑の祭里, Konwaku no Matsuri); 34. "Origami Folding Gods" (折神, Origami)
5	August 4, 2021	978-4-08-882732-2	September 26, 2023	978-1-64827-224-0
35. "Soga-kun and Korogi-senpai" (宋牙くんと香炉木先輩, Sōga-kun to Kōrogi-senpai); 36. "The Mysterious Snow Maiden" (謎の雪娘, Nazo no Yuki Musume); 37. "Operation Capture Rochka" (ラチカ捕獲作戦, Rachika Hokaku Sakusen); 38. "Snegurochka and Ungaikyo" (スネグーラチカと雲外鏡, Sunegūrachika to Ungaikyō); 39. "Rochka Loses Control" (ラチカ暴走, Rachika Bōsō); 40. "Shirogane Catches a Cold" (シロガネの風邪, Shirogane no Kaze); 41. "Suzu's Belly Button" (すずのおへそ, Suzu no Oheso); 42. "Ibuki-sensei" (いぶき先生, Ibuki Sensei); 43. "Mother-Daughter Time" (母娘水入らず, Oyako Mizuirazu)
6	October 4, 2021	978-4-08-882790-2	November 14, 2023	978-1-68579-941-0
44. "Matsuri's Training" (祭里の行, Matsuri Sato no Gyō); 45. "Suzu's Determination" (すずの決意, Suzu no Ketsui); 46. "Blazing Omiko City" (灼熱の小美呼市, Shakunetsu no Omiko-shi); 47. "Collaborative Mission" (共同忍務, Kyōdō Misshon); 48. "The Girls and the Hiderigami" (日照り神と乙女たち, Hiderigami to Otome-tachi); 49. "Rain and a Phone Call" (雨と電話, Ame to Denwa); 50. "Ded's Incantation" (ジェドとおまじない, Jedo to Omajinai); 51. "I Saw It" (視えちゃった, Miechatta); 52. "Matsuri & Suzu vs. Kubire Oni" (祭里・すずVS縊鬼, Matsuri Suzu Bāsasu Kubire Oni)
7	January 4, 2022	978-4-08-882881-7	January 2, 2024	979-8-88843-099-6
53. "Suzu's Invitation" (すずのお誘い, Suzu no Osasoi); 54. "Touch" (ふれあい, Fureai); 55. "A Dangerous Encounter" (アブナイ出会い, Abunai Deai); 56. "The 'Ayakashi Medium' Ayakashi" (〝妖巫女〞の妖, 'Ayakashi Miko' no Ayakashi); 57. "When Past and Present Meet" (交わる前世と現世, Majiwaru Zense to Gense); 58. "Life Halo" (命光輪, Meikōrin); 59. "Ayakashi Medium vs. Kazamaki Matoi" (妖巫女VS風巻纏, Ayakashi Miko Bāsasu Kazamaki Matoi); 60. "Just Once More..." (「もう一度だけ…」, "Mō Ichido dake..."); 61. "The Responsibility of the Ayakashi Medium" (妖巫女の責任, Ayakashi Miko no Sekinin)
8	March 4, 2022	978-4-08-883034-6	March 12, 2024	979-8-88843-409-3
62. "Artist Curse Jutsu" (画呪術, Ga Jujutsu); 63. "Hinojiki's Revenge" (日喰リベンジ, Hinojiki Ribenji); 64. "I Want to Save You" (君を助けたい, Kimi o Tasuketai); 65. "The Pain of Battle" (戦いの痛み, Tatakai no Itami); 66. "Matsuri's Inner Storm" (祭里〝嵐身〞, Matsuri "Ranshin"); 67. "Welcome Back" (おかえり, Okaeri); 68. "Ah, I Love Love Love You!" (ああ、好き、好き、好き！, Aa, Suki, Suki, Suki!); 69. "More Than Friends?" (トモダチ以上…？, Tomodachi Ijō...?); 70. "Let's Rush In!" (突入せよ！！, Totsunyū Seyo!!)
9	June 3, 2022	978-4-08-883148-0	May 21, 2024	979-8-88843-639-4
71. "Not Fair" (ずるい, Zurui); 72. "Wet Tactics" (濡れた駆け引き, Nureta Kakehiki); 73. "Blow That Rumor Away!" (ウワサを吹き飛ばせ！, Uwasa o Fukitobase!); 74. "Mysterious Hunter Lucy (Part One)" (未確認探偵ルーシー（前編）, Mikakunin Tantei Rūshī (Zenpen)); 75. "Mysterious Hunter Lucy (Part Two)" (未確認探偵ルーシー（後編）, Mikakunin Tantei Rūshī (Kōhen)); 76. "Steamy Manipulation" (操心蒸気, Sōshin Jōki); 77. "The Girl and the Bean" (豆と乙女, Mame to Otome); 78. "Matsuri Fever" (マツリ熱, Matsuri Netsu); 79. "Lippy" (ビル子, Biruko); Bonus Story. "Want a Cooling Rochka?" (冷やしラチカはいかが？)
10	September 2, 2022	978-4-08-883250-0	July 23, 2024	979-8-88843-671-4
80. "The Man They Call Masurao!!" (その男、益荒男！！, Sono Otoko, Masurao!!); 81. "Matsuri Saw!" (祭里は見た！！, Matsuri wa Mita!!); 82. "Voice from the Past" (思い出の声, Omoide no Koe); 83. "Present from Rochka" (ラチカのプレゼント, Rachika no Purezento); 84. "Ninokuru, Gender Swap Awakened?!" (ニノ曲・性醒流転！？, Nino-kyoku-sei Seiryū Ten!?); 85. "Shuriken Memories" (手裏剣の思い出, Shuriken no Omoide); 86. "Reo's Slump" (恋緒のスランプ, Ren'o no Suranpu); 87. "Suzu Spirited Away" (すずの神隠し, Suzu no Kamigakushi); 88. "Irreplaceable" (かけがえのないもの, Kakegae no Nai Mono); Bonus Story. "Kotatsu" (こたつ)
11	November 4, 2022	978-4-08-883363-7	September 3, 2024	979-8-88843-863-3
89. "Shiv and the Shivers" (ぶるぶる, Buruburu); 90. "Feelings of a Young Heart" (幼心の想い, Osanagokoro no Omoi); 91. "Kanade" (かなで, Kanade); 92. "Reason to Help" (助ける理由, Tasukeru Riyū); 93. "Those in Love with an Ayakashi Medium" (妖巫女に恋した者たち, Yōfu On'na ni Koi Shita-sha-tachi); 94. "Ritta's Nightmare?!" (律太の悪夢, Ritsuto no Akumu); 95. "The Monster Within" (内なる獣, Uchinaru Kemono); 96. "Seduced by an Older Woman" (歳上のお願い, Toshiue no Onegai); 97. "Kachofugetsu Camp" (花鳥風月キャンプ, Kachōfūgetsu Kyanpu)
12	January 4, 2023	978-4-08-883440-5	November 26, 2024	979-8-88843-864-0
98. "Matsuri vs. Lucy?!" (祭里VSルーシー！？, Matsuri VS Rūshī!?); 99. "A Wall in the Mountain Pass" (峠のぬりかべ, Tōge no Nuri ka be); 100. "Une the Ungaikyo" (雲外鏡 卯音, Ungaikyo Une); 101. "Meow" (にゃあ, Nyaa); 102. "Catgirl in Action" (駆ける猫娘, Kakeru Nekomusume); 103. "A Troubled Shadow Mei" (カゲメイの困惑, Kagemei no Konwaku); 104. "The Hairpin of Old Memories" (想い出の髪留め, Omoide no Kamitome); 105. "Shirogane in Love?!" (シロガネの恋!?, Shirogane no Koi!?); 106. "Haya's Task" (刃夜の修行, Haya no Shugyō)
13	March 3, 2023	978-4-08-883514-3	January 21, 2025	979-8-88843-865-7
107. "Gender Swap Awakened, Reversed?!" (性惺流転・解除！？, Sei Senryūten Kaijo!?); 108. "Kanade and Shirogane" (かなでとシロガネ, Kanade to Shirogane); 109. "Love Powder" (愛粉(ラブパウダー), Rabu Paudā); 110. "Yayoi and Ninokuru" (弥生とニノ曲先輩, Yayoi to Ninokuru Senpai); 111. "Ayakashi of the Moon" (月の妖, Tsuki no Ayakashi); 112. "The Crimson Gourd" (妖具・紅葫蘆, Ayakashi gu Kurenai Hōrō); 113. "Reo vs. Donpa" (恋緒VSドンパ, Reo VS Donpa); 114. "Life in the Throes of Death" (死中に活あり, Shichū ni Katsu ari); 115. "Gogyosen" (五行仙, Gogyōsen)
14	June 2, 2023	978-4-08-883545-7	March 11, 2025	979-8-89160-910-5
116. "The Ayakashi Medium's True Identity" (妖巫女の正体, Ayakashi Miko no Shōtai); 117. "The Corruption's Destination" (穢れの行, Kegare no Gyō); 118. "Two Matsuris" (2人の祭里, Futari no Matsuri); 119. "A Fake?" (ニセモノ？, Nisemono?); 120. "What Lurks in the Mansion" (屋敷に潜むもの, Yashiki ni Hisomu Mono); 121. "Hinojiki's Desire" (日喰の想い, Hijiki no Omoi); 122. "Wicked Devourer" (禍喰, Magabami); 123. "Matsuri vs. Matsuri?!" (祭里VS祭里, Matsuri Bāsasu Matsuri); 124. "Closeness to Suzu" (すずとの距離, Suzu to no Kyori)
15	September 4, 2023	978-4-08-883712-3	May 27, 2025	979-8-89160-972-3
125. "Shadow Mei's Hope" (カゲメイの期待, Kage Mei no Kitai); 126. "A Man's Appeal" (男の色気, Otoko no Iroke); 127. "The God-Killing Course" (神殺しの呪い, Kamigoroshi no Noroi); 128. "The Gogyosen's Romantic Comedy Plan" (五行仙のらぶこめ作戦, Gogyōsen no Rabukome Sakusen); 129. "The Aquarium Date" (アクアリウム・デート, Akuariumu Dēto); 130. "Matsuri's Love and Suzu's Resolve" (祭里のブラとすすの決意, Matsuri no Bura to Suzu no Ketsui); 131. "Love Prison" (愛の牢獄, Rabu Purishon); 132. "Kanade Suzu's Onslaught" (花奏すずの猛攻, Kanade Suzu no Mōkō); 133. "The Fearsome Lippy" (恐るべきビル子, Osorubeki Biruko); 134. "Love Battle" (愛の攻防, Ai no Kōbō); Bonus Chapter 88.5. "Matsuri's Birthday" (祭里の誕生日, Matsuri no Tanjōbi)
16	December 4, 2023	978-4-08-883802-1	July 8, 2025	979-8-89373-011-1
135. "Steeled for Self-Exorcism" (己を祓う覚悟, Onore o Harau Kakugo); 136. "Suzu's Wrath" (すず、怒る, Suzu Ikaru); 137. "Utagawa Garaku vs. the Gogyosen" (歌川画楽 VS 五行仙, Utagawa Garaku VS Gogyō Sen); 138. "Treasure" (宝物, Takaramono); 139. "The True Ayakashi Medium" (真・妖巫女, Ma Ayakashi Miko); 140. "The Ayakashi Medium's Blade" (妖巫女の"剣, Ayakashi Miko no Tsurugi); 141. "The Power of Shamelessness" (破廉恥の力, Harenchi no Chikara); 142. "Resolution" (♡決着♡, ♡Ketchaku♡); 143. "The Winds of Change Blow Again" (再び、 流転のとき, Futatabi, Ruten no Toki); 144. "Matsuri, Suzu, and the Grand Conclusion" (祭里とすずと大団円, Matsuri to Suzu to Daidan'en); One-Shot. "Leo × Leo" (れお×レオ, Reo Reo)

== Media ==
=== Vomic ===
A vomic (voice comic) adaptation of Ayakashi Triangle started to be released on November 20, 2020, with episodes uploaded to Jump Comics' official YouTube channel. The vomic shows the manga images appearing on screen as voice actors, music and sound effects are heard. It stars both Hiromu Mineta and Yūki Kyōka as Matsuri Kazamaki (Mineta voices the character in his male form and Kyōka voices his female form), Saya Aizawa as Suzu Kanade, and both Mitsuteru Nagato and Hikaru Fujikura as Shirogane (Nagato voices Shirogane in his standard cat form while Fujikura voices his ayakashi form), among other voice actors.

=== Anime ===
On December 18, 2021, during Jump Festa 2022, an anime television series adaptation was announced. The series is produced by Connect and directed by Noriaki Akitaya, with assistant direction by Kei Umabiki, scripts written by Shogo Yasukawa, character designs handled by Hideki Furukawa, and music composed by Rei Ishizuka. It premiered on January 10, 2023, on GYT and other networks. The Dance for Philosophy performed the opening theme song "Neppu wa Ruten-suru" (熱風は流転する), while MIMiNARI performed the ending theme song "Itowanai" (厭わない) featuring Miyu Tomita and Kana Ichinose. Crunchyroll streamed the series.

On January 23, it was announced that the series would be on a hiatus following the airing of episode 5 due to production delays caused by the COVID-19 pandemic. On February 27, it was announced that episodes 5 and 6 would air on March 7 and 14 respectively, but stated that it will announce details for episode 7 and beyond at a future date. The series restarted broadcasting from the first episode on July 11 and ended on September 26, 2023.

==== Episodes ====
No.	Title	Directed by (Note: Information is taken from the ending credits of each episode.)	Written by	Storyboarded by	Original release date
1	"Matsuri, Suzu, and Ayakashi"; Transliteration: "Matsuri to Suzu to Ayakashi" (Japanese: 祭里とすずと妖)	Geisei Morita	Shogo Yasukawa	Kei Umabiki	January 10, 2023
2	"Girl Friend"; Transliteration: "Onna Tomodachi" (Japanese: オンナトモダチ)	Susumu Yamamoto	Shogo Yasukawa	Kazuhisa Takenouchi	January 17, 2023
3	"The Speedster Exorcist Ninja"; Transliteration: "Shinsoku no Harainin" (Japanese: 神速の祓忍)	Yūsuke Tomita	Shingo Irie	Yūsuke Tomita	January 24, 2023
4	"The Melancholy of the Ayakashi Medium"; Transliteration: "Ayakashi Miko no Yūutsu" (Japanese: 妖巫女の憂鬱)	Yū Yabūchi	Shogo Yasukawa	Masayoshi Nishida	January 31, 2023
5	"Omokage"; Transliteration: "Omokage" (Japanese: オモカゲ)	Geisei Morita	Shingo Irie	Haifeng Liang	March 7, 2023
6	"Those Who See, and Those Who Can't"; Transliteration: "Mieru, Mienai" (Japanese: 視える、視えない)	Junya Koshiba	Yuki Tanihata	Koji Sawai	March 14, 2023
7	"Utagawa Garaku"; Transliteration: "Utagawa Garaku" (Japanese: 歌川画楽)	Masashi Ōkubo	Shogo Yasukawa	Masayoshi Nishida	August 22, 2023
8	"Her First"; Transliteration: "Hajimete no Hito" (Japanese: 初めてのひと)	Chihaya Tanaka	Yuki Tanihata	Chihaya Tanaka	August 29, 2023
9	"An Encounter with 'Him'?"; Transliteration: "'Kare' to no Sōgū?" (Japanese: "彼"との遭遇?)	Yūsuke Tomita	Shogo Yasukawa	Kazuhisa Takenouchi	September 5, 2023
10	"The Enticing Boy"; Transliteration: "Izanau Shōnen" (Japanese: 誘う少年)	Hisakazu Ishikawa	Shingo Irie	Royden B	September 12, 2023
11	"The Spirit of Harmony"; Transliteration: "Chōwa no Kokoro" (Japanese: 調和の心)	Geisei Morita; Yūsuke Tomita	Shingo Irie	Kazuhisa Takenouchi	September 19, 2023
12	"Kanade Suzu, the King of Ayakashi"; Transliteration: "Ayakashi no Ō Kanade Suzu" (Japanese: 妖の王・花奏すず)	Erio Koshino; Noriaki Akitaya	Shogo Yasukawa	Kei Umabiki; Noriaki Akitaya	September 26, 2023

== Reception ==
=== Popularity ===
Ever since the debut of Ayakashi Triangle, the term TS Yuri (TS百合), which stands for Transsexual Yuri, has become a popular trend on Twitter in response to the series' primary romance involving exclusively female characters with a technically male MC, who also temporarily became a girl.

==== Sales ====
In Japan, the first volume of Ayakashi Triangle debuted in 10th place on the daily Shoseki rankings with more than 23,350 copies sold on October 2, 2020. It subsequently dropped to 20th and then to 35th on October 4. As of October 13, Ayakashi Triangle sold more than 33,000 copies, surpassing the sales for the volumes of both Mashle: Magic and Muscles and Undead Unluck.

=== Critical response ===
Reviewing the first two chapters of Ayakashi Triangle, Shawn Hacaga of The Fandom Post called the story "decent" but "nothing special". Apart from strongly praising Yabuki's art as "gorgeous" and "fantastic", Hacaga also said it was fun nonetheless and admitted to being surprised by the gender-swap at the end of the first chapter. Reviewing for UT Daily Beacon, Connor Holt gave the manga a rating of 3 out of 5, saying that Ayakashi Triangle is average when viewed as an ecchi manga, but fails when viewed as a romantic comedy. Holt also commented on how he prefers for the manga to continue in this direction and that it helps to differentiate Ayakashi Triangle from other series in Weekly Shōnen Jump. In another review, Holt complimented on how Yabuki has managed a perfect balancing act between the manga's love triangle narrative, battle elements and ecchi overtones, saying it "gives readers an actual reason to read this manga and enjoy it as it comes into its own".

Jacob Parker-Dalton of Otaquest praised Yabuki's art style, in addition to comparing Ayakashi Triangle with Akihisa Ikeda's Rosario + Vampire: "dumb, horny, but definitely crafted with care and attention". Dalton also expressed his opinion on how Ayakashi Triangle looks like the first installment of a manga from the mid-2000s, since the series, according to him, "reuses several elements typical of that period: demons and yōkai, for one, but also shameless objectification, gender bending, and even a cute animal mascot". In a later review, Dalton emphasized the "quality" writing of Ayakashi Triangle, comparing it to Hirohiko Araki's JoJo's Bizarre Adventure by stating that "one of the series' latest chapters, in particular, was well written enough to warrant a comparison". In a third review for Ayakashi Triangle, Dalton positively remarked on the development of the series' plot as a "well-constructed story with plenty of emotional moments", and how the manga is "quickly proving to be far more competent than it initially appeared to be".

Thomas Daniell of AllYourAnime.Net commended Ayakashi Triangle as "clearly the work of a long established mangaka and not some newbie", but still criticized the developments of the manga as being "predictable", and noted that while Matsuri's gender-swap at the end of the first chapter was a "fun twist", it is a cliché widely used in anime and manga. Regarding the characters, Daniell said that, albeit they are not original, Yabuki's focus on them allows the details of the manga to "drip in a bit more naturally". Daniell also highlighted the series' use of fan service, and felt that, although it is used in part for comedic effect, its main purpose is to draw audience. Matthew Newman of Beneath the Tangles wrote, "The whole idea of ninja exorcists already had me interested. The first chapter is really packed full and, while there are some ecchi moments, overall it's a lot of fun. The series is rated above Teen, so you'd need to read it on the Shonen Jump website and not their app. But so far, I think it's worth checking out."

=== Accolades ===
In the 3rd edition of the Portuguese Geeks d'Ouro award in 2021, Ayakashi Triangle was nominated for the Best Manga category.

== See also ==
- Japanese folktales
