= Takashi Shirogane =

Fictional character from the Voltron franchise

- Voltron character
- First appearance: As Takashi Shirogane: "Escape from Slave Castle" (1981); As Sven Holgersson: "Space Explorers Captured" (1984)
- Last appearance: As Takashi 'Shiro' Shirogane: "The End is the Beginning" (2018); As Sven Holgersson: "Hole in the Sky" (2017)
- Voiced by: Ryūsei Nakao (1981–1982); Michael Bell (1984–1985); Alan Marriott (2011–2012); Josh Keaton (2016–2018)

In-universe information
- Full name: Takashi Shirogane (Beast King GoLion, Legendary Defender); Sven Holgersson (Voltron, Force)
- Aliases: The Champion; Shiro the Hero
- Nicknames: Quiet; Shiro
- Species: Human; Clone (Legendary Defender)
- Gender: Male
- Occupation: Paladin (formerly); Captain of the Atlas
- Family: Ryou Shirogane (brother, Beast King GoLion)
- Spouses: Romelle (wife, Voltron); Curtis (husband, Legendary Defender)
- Significant others: Adam W. (deceased ex-fiancé, Legendary Defender)
- Nationality: Japanese (Beast King GoLion, Legendary Defender); Norwegian (Voltron, Force, Legendary Defender)

Takashi Shirogane (銀 貴, Shirogane Takashi), known as Sven Holgersson in the original English dub of Beast King GoLion as Voltron, as well as in an alternate universe in Voltron: Legendary Defender, is a fictional character in the media franchise Voltron, and a member of the Voltron Force. He has been voiced by Ryūsei Nakao, Michael Bell, Alan Marriott, and Josh Keaton.

The character has received a positive critical reception, although his depiction as a gay human clone of the original Shiro in Legendary Defender has been criticised as being poorly written.

== Conception and creation ==
In Voltron, the character (renamed Sven in the English dub) is a composite character of two characters from Beast King Go Lion: Takashi Shirogane, the original blue lion pilot who was killed in episode 6, and Ryou Shirogane, Takashi's brother. Since they looked alike, WEP simply decided that the character would survive the events of episode 6 and be treated as if they were the same character.

In Voltron: Legendary Defender, the Takashi Shirogane name from Beast King Go Lion is reused for the character, now nicknamed 'Shiro', with the Sven name being used for an alternate universe version of him appearing in the third season. Josh Keaton only discovered that the character had a Scandinavian accent the day before the recording. Shiro was reconceived as a gay Japanese man with a boyfriend named Adam, in contrast to Sven who was Norwegian and later married Princess Romelle. Shiro was originally intended to be a teenager but rewritten him to be 25 years old after his designs were finalised. Originally intended to die in the second season, the character comes back as a clone with his soul trapped inside the Black Lion, before being restored to full life in the sixth season.

== Appearances ==
=== Beast King GoLion and Voltron: Defender of the Universe ===
Nicknamed Quiet (黙り, Danmari), Takashi Shirogane is the original second-in-command in Beast King GoLion, piloting the Blue Lion and wearing a black uniform. In the sixth episode of the series, he is mortally wounded during an attack by Honerva and is given a hero's burial, with Princess Fala replacing him as the Blue Lion's pilot. He has a twin brother named Ryou Shirogane, who, along with Princess Amue, joins the heroes in the fight against the Galra Empire, later also perishing in battle.

In Voltron, both Shirogane brothers were combined as Sven Holgersson, part of exploratory team sent by the Galaxy Alliance to planet Arus, who after being captured and sent to Planet Doom, he escaped to Arus once again and became the pilot of the Blue Lion. Sometime later Sven saved Lance from an attack from witch Haggar, resulting in Sven being sent to a space hospital and eventually being replaced by Princess Allura, ruler of the planet Arus. After the planet is taken over and Sven is enslaved, he escapes once again and manages to reunite with the Voltron Force where they help Romelle escape planet Doom, later marrying Princess Romelle. In the final battle against the Galra, Sven sacrifices himself to ensure victory but ultimately survives unlike his GoLion counterparts to go onto the American original 3rd season of Voltron as an important recurring character.

=== Voltron Force ===
Sven makes an appearance in 2011 Voltron Force. Sven appears in the episode in “Ghost in the Lion.” Sven was a former pilot of Blue Lion. He has been infected when Haggar's cat had attacked him and eventually the infection progressed so he had to stay in a very cold environment to keep the infection from overtaking his mind.

=== Voltron: Legendary Defender ===
Shiro is introduced as a pilot of Galaxy Garrison who was kidnapped by the Galra Empire while on a mission to Kerberos. Having become a famed gladiator in the Empire arena and receiving a robot arm, Shiro pilots the Black Lion of Voltron until the defeat of Zarkon in the second season, and he is apparently killed. In the third season, Shiro is seen escaping the captivity of the Galra Empire, returning to the Voltron force and resuming his status as the Black Paladin after Keith chooses to become a full-fledged member of the Blade of Marmora. In the sixth season, it is discovered that this Shiro is a clone and Shiro's essence was absorbed into Black Lion after he died at the conclusion of the second season. Allura transfers his essence into the clone's body and Shiro's memories completely return. In the seventh season, the Voltron force arrives back on Earth and Shiro becomes the captain of the Atlas, a Garrison battleship. At the conclusion of the eighth season, several years after Hagar's defeat, Shiro retires, marrying Curtis, a Garrison soldier.

In the third season of Voltron: Legendary Defender, Sven is featured in "Hole in the Sky" as an alternative reality version of Shiro and a member of the Guns of Gamara, a rebel faction fighting against the Altean Empire that ruled his reality Universe for 10,000 years. He died protecting Felix and Lance after taking an energy lance for him. According to Joaquim Dos Santos, the original Sven was often a topic in the writer's room because of how often thinking about inspiration from the original Voltron series led to someone doing the character's voice.

== Comic series ==
In the 2011 Devil's Due comic series, Sven's surname is revealed as Holgersson, a surname later incorporated into Voltron: Legendary Defender. The comic book version of Sven depicts him as 27, the oldest member on the team. Unlike his cartoon counterpart, the comic book Sven is given much further depth, and plays a major role. Much of Sven's past remains unknown, except that he was a former member of an elite Navy squad similar to the SEALS. During an insurrection in a small South American country, a serious miscommunication caused a foreign national Sven was supposed to extract to believe Sven was an assassin and opened fire. Sven was left with no choice but to fire back, protecting himself and eliminating the extraction target. He was then placed on "administrative leave" until he was approached by Colonel Hawkins to join a team of outcasts to search for the legendary robot Voltron on the distant planet Arus. Sven was possibly the most anti-social of the group, but this is possibly due to being the oldest and most mature. Unlike in the cartoon, Sven never got a chance to properly form Voltron, or even get to wear his classic black uniform. This is due to him having a brain defect that caused the magic of Voltron to somehow reject him. This brain defect caused him to fall under the influence of Queen Merla and Haggar, under which he betrayed his friends and Arus by stealing files from the Castle of Lions' control room. He was then placed on a mission alongside Prince Lotor, during which the two found themselves having to survive together and try to trust each other. During a conflict that erupted later, Sven apparently crash-landed on planet Pollux, where he was discovered by Princess Romelle. Due to the comic's hiatus, what path Sven's tale would have taken from that point remains a mystery.

The Shiro incarnation of the character was featured in a Voltron: Legendary Defender comic series, bridging the time lapse between seasons.

== Reception ==
The Legendary Defender incarnations of the character have received mostly positive reception. However, the character's romantic relationships with Adam, who was only mentioned in flashback scenes and killed off-screen, and Curtis, his co-worker and eventual husband, were criticized for not being fleshed out enough and being poor LGBT representation.
