= Ryūsei Nakao =

Japanese actor and singer (born 1951)

- 中尾 隆聖
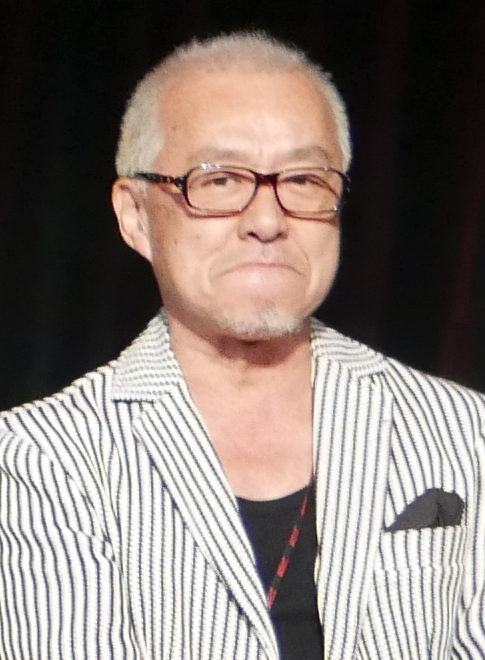
- Nakao at Nan Desu Kan 2017
- Born: Tomoharu Takeo (竹尾 智晴); February 5, 1951 (age 75); Nihonbashi, Chuo-ku, Tokyo, Japan
- Other names: Tomoharu Minamiya; Tomo-chan
- Occupations: Actor; voice actor; singer
- Years active: 1954–present
- Agent: 81 Produce
- Known for: Let's Go! Anpanman as Baikinman; Dragon Ball as Frieza; Moomin as Sniff; Topo Gigio as Topo Gigio; Bleach as Mayuri Kurotsuchi; One Piece as Caesar Clown and Dr. Indigo; Beast King GoLion as Takashi Shirogane
- Children: 2, including Kazuma Takeo

Tomoharu Takeo (竹尾 智晴, Takeo Tomoharu; born February 5, 1951), known by his stage name Ryūsei Nakao (中尾 隆聖, Nakao Ryūsei), is a Japanese actor, voice actor and singer from Tokyo attached to 81 Produce. He worked under the name of Tomoharu Minamiya (南谷 智晴, Minamiya Tomoharu) and is married with two children, a son and daughter.

His distinctive voice lands him in the roles of characters with high-pitched voices and sadistic personalities. As a voice actor, he is best known for the roles of Baikinman in Let's Go! Anpanman, Frieza, Tambourine, Cooler, Chilled, and Frost in Dragon Ball, Ishami Nishimura in Touch, Porori in Niko Niko Pun, Resshi in Do-Re-Mi-Fa Donuts, Echikettojii-san in Hotch Potch Station, Sniff in Moomin, the titular character in Topo Gigio, Mayuri Kurotsuchi in Bleach, Caesar Clown and Dr. Indigo in One Piece, and Takashi Shirogane in Beast King GoLion.

== Filmography ==
=== Television animation ===
==== 1960s ====
- Uchū Patrol Hopper (1965) – Jun (first voice)
- Animal 1 (1968) – Tomoharu Takeo, Tōichirō
- Attack No. 1 (1969) – Student

==== 1970s ====
- Akaki Chi no Eleven (1970) – Hayato Taki (second voice)
- Marvelous Melmo (1971) – Shogo Chikaishi
- Kum-Kum (1975) – Roman
- 3000 Leagues in Search of Mother (1976) – Miguel

==== 1980s ====
- Mighty Atom (1980) – Sam
- Ashita No Joe 2 (1980) – Carlos Rivera
- Beast King GoLion (1981) – Takashi Shirogane, Ryō Shirogane
- Thunderbirds 2086 (1982) – Sammy Edkins Junior
- Igano Kabamaru (1983) – Igano Kabamaru
- Touch (1985) – Isami Nishimura
- Anmitsu Hime (1986) – E.T.
- Uchuusen Sagittarius (1986) -Binta
- Dragon Ball (1988) – Tambourine
- Saint Seiya (1988) – Kraken Isaac
- Let's Go! Anpanman (1988) – Baikinman
- Chimpui (1989) – Majirō
- City Hunter 3 (1989) – Toru Kazama
- Jungle Emperor (1989) – Totto
- Time Patrol Pon (1989) – Louie

==== 1990s ====
- Dragon Ball Z (1990) – Frieza
- Delightful Moomin Family (1990) – Sniff
- Holly the Ghost (1991) – Toreppā
- Montana Jones (1994) – Alfred Jones
- Don't Leave Me Alone, Daisy (1997) – Iwan
- Dragon Ball GT (1997) – Frieza
- Monster Farm (1997) – Taichō Rōdorannā
- AWOL -Absent Without Leave- (1998) – Pete Kuruten
- Cowboy Bebop (1998) – Rocco Bonnaro
- Devilman Lady (1998) – Jason Bates
- Weiß Kreuz (1998) – Farfarello
- Yu-Gi-Oh (1998) – Trump Bomber

==== 2000s ====
- Baby Felix (2000) – Marty
- Gakkō no Kaidan (2000) – Amanojaku
- Shinzo (2000) – Gyaza
- One Piece (2001) – Whirlwind Eric, father, Indigo, Caesar Clown
- Digimon Frontier (2002) – Lucemon (Falldown Mode and Satan Mode)
- Jing: King of Bandits (2002) – Kir
- Midnight Horror School (2002) – Yumyum
- Pecola (2002) – Saruyama-san
- Rockman.EXE (2002) – Snakeman
- Requiem from the Darkness (2003) – Mataichi
- Beet the Vandel Buster (2004) – Shaggy
- Bleach (2005) – Mayuri Kurotsuchi
- Buzzer Beater (2005) – Han
- Ginga Legend Weed (2005) – Smith
- Kaiketsu Zorori (2005) – Akuma (devil)
- Rockman.EXE Beast (2005) – ZoanoSnakeman
- Demashita! Powerpuff Girls Z (2006) – Kare, advertisement narration
- Gintama (2006) – Daraku
- D.Gray-man (2007) – Eshi
- Princess Resurrection (2007) – Shigara
- Mokke (2007) – Izuna
- Mononoke (2007) – Genkei
- Shōnen Onmyōji (2007) – Chishiki no Gūji
- GeGeGe no Kitarō (fifth series) (2008) – Onmoraki
- Rosario + Vampire (2008) – Tadashi Wanibuchi
- Scarecrowman (2008) – Crash
- Dragon Ball Kai (2009) – Frieza
- Golgo 13 (2009) – Asshu
- Sōten Kōro (2009) – Narration

==== 2010s ====
- Naruto Shippuden (2010) – Nekomata
- The World God Only Knows (2010) – Kodama
- Suite PreCure (2011) – Noise
- Persona 4: The Animation (2012) – Ameno-Sagiri
- Doraemon (2012) – Majime
- Bakumatsu Rock (2014) – Yoshida Shōin
- Mushishi: The Next Chapter (2014) – Suguro
- Space Dandy (2014) – Minato
- One-Punch Man (2015) – Vaccine Man
- Rin-ne (2015) – Fireworks Seller (Episode 21)
- Dragon Ball Super (2016) – Frieza, Frost
- Haikyū!! (2016) – Tanji Washijō
- ACCA: 13-Territory Inspection Dept. (2017) – Falke II
- Pop Team Epic (2018) – Popuko (Episode 3-B)
- How to Keep a Mummy (2018) – Aayan
- Garo: Vanishing Line (2018) – King
- Magical Girl Site (2018) – Nana
- Skull-face Bookseller Honda-san (2018) – Majutsushi
- The Ones Within (2019) – Wall
- Mix (2019) – Isami Nishimura

==== 2020s ====
- Oda Cinnamon Nobunaga (2020) – Matsunaga "Buu" Hisahide
- Lapis Re:Lights (2020) – Board Game (Episode 5)
- Bleach: Thousand-Year Blood War (2022) – Mayuri Kurotsuchi
- Rent-A-Girlfriend (2022) – Katsuhito Ichinose
- Trigun Stampede (2023) – William Conrad
- Ron Kamonohashi's Forbidden Deductions (2023) – Disguise Instructor
- Demon Slayer: Kimetsu no Yaiba (2024) - Hashibami
- Beastars Final Season (2024) - Cornu
- Farmagia (2025) - Glaza
- Gachiakuta (2025) - Alice
- Witch Hat Atelier (2026) - Sasaran

=== Original video animation (OVA) ===
- Armored Trooper Votoms: The Last Red Shoulder (1985) – Murza Melym
- Baribari Legend (1987) – Hideyoshi Hijiri
- Crying Freeman (1988) – Huáng Dé-Yuán
- Armored Trooper Votoms: The Red Shoulder Document: Roots of Ambition (1988) – Murza Melym
- Legend of the Galactic Heroes (1989) – Louis Mashengo
- Wizardry (1991) – Flack
- Chameleon (1992) – Akio Kugo
- Dragon Ball Z Side Story: Plan to Eradicate the Saiyans (1993) – Frieza, Cooler
- Armitage the Third (1995) – Rene D'anclaude
- Golgo 13 "Queen Bee" (1998) – Thomas Wolson
- Psychic Force (1998) – Brad Kilsten
- Rurouni Kenshin: Trust & Betrayal (1999) – Iizuka
- Alien Nine (2001) – Borg
- Usagi-chan de Cue!! (2001) – Chou of Benten
- Jing, King of Bandits: Seventh Heaven (2004) – Kir
- Saint Seiya: The Lost Canvas (2009) – Icelus
- Dragon Ball: Episode of Bardock (2011) – Chilled, Frieza

=== Theatrical animation ===
- Doraemon: Nobita's Little Star Wars (1985) – PCIA soldier
- Saint Seiya (1987) – Christ (Ghost Saint of Southern Cross)
- The Five Star Stories (1989) – Decors
- Let's Go! Anpanman series (1989–present) – Baikinman
- Dragon Ball Z: Cooler's Revenge (1991) – Cooler, Frieza
- Dragon Ball Z: The Return of Cooler (1992) – Metal-Cooler
- Dragon Ball Z: Fusion Reborn (1995) – Frieza
- The Doraemons series (1997–2001) – El Matadora (third voice)
- Jigoku Sensei Nūbē: Gozen 0 Toki Nūbē Shizu (1997) – Pierro
- Meitantei Conan: 14 Banme no Target (1998) – Kohei Sawaki
- Blade of the Phantom Master (2004) – Byun
- Bleach: Memories of Nobody (2006) – Mayuri Kurotsuchi
- Bleach: The DiamondDust Rebellion (2007) – Mayuri Kurotsuchi
- Bleach: Fade to Black (2008) – Mayuri Kurotsuchi
- One Piece Film: Strong World (2009) – Dr. Indigo
- Welcome to the Space Show (2010) – Neppo
- Go! Princess Precure (2015) – Night Pumpkin
- Dragon Ball Z: Resurrection 'F' (2015) – Frieza
- Dragon Ball Super: Broly (2018) – Frieza
- Shimajiro to Ururu no Heroland (2019) – Takoyaki Mask
- Seven Days War (2019) – High-Level Politician
- Doraemon: Nobita's Sky Utopia (2023) – Doctor Ray
- Anpanman: Baikinman and Lulun in the Picture Book (2024) - Baikinman

=== Television drama ===
- Taiyō ni Hoero! (1982) – George
- Yūsha Yoshihiko (2011) – Demon King Galius (voice)
- Anpan (2025) – Tokizo Furuyama

=== Other television ===
- 76th NHK Kōhaku Uta Gassen (2025), Nakao performed the Anpanman theme song along with Keiko Toda, Koichi Yamadera, and others.

=== Live-action film ===
- Saint Young Men: The Movie (2024) – Black monster (voice)

=== Radio drama ===
- Cat's Eye (xxxx) – Toshio Utsumi

=== Drama CD ===
- Hayō no Tsurugi (xxxx, first CD) – Anshu
- Weiss Kreuz Dramatic Image Album Vier & Fünf: Schwarz Ein & Zwei (xxxx) – Farfarello
- Chouai (xxxx) – Yuuta Hagiwara
- Psychic Force Sound Story (xxxx) – Brad Kilsten
- Kyuuketsuhime Miyu Seiyou Shinma-hen (xxxx) – Cait Sith

=== Video games ===
- Dragon Ball series – Frieza, Cooler, Kuriza, Tambourine
- Cosmic Fantasy (1990) – Baron
- Kaze no Densetsu Xanadu (1994) – Jiido
- Psychic Force (1995) – Brad Kilsten
- Puzzle Bobble 4 (1998) – Develon, Madame Luna
- Tail Concerto (1998) – Fool
- Ace Combat 3: Electrosphere (1999) – Simon Orestes Cohen
- Super Puzzle Bobble (1999) – Develon
- Persona 2: Innocent Sin (1999) – Tatsuya Sudō
- Bōken Jidai Katsugeki Goemon (2000) – Shujaku
- The Bouncer (2000) – Kou Leifou
- Harry Potter and the Philosopher's Stone (2001) – Professor Quirinus Quirrell (Japanese dub)
- Kidō Senshi Gundam: Gihren no Yabō: Zeon Dokuritsusenzō Ki (2002) – Thomas Kurutsu
- Raijin Ping-Pong (2002) – Kaiji
- Kidō Senshi Gundam: Senshitachi no Kiseki (2004) – Thomas Kurutsu
- Kingdom Hearts II (2005) – Ling
- Musashi: Samurai Legend (2005) – Shiraz
- Battle Stadium D.O.N (2006) – Frieza
- Banjo-Kazooie: Nuts & Bolts (2008) – Narrator (Japanese dub)
- El Shaddai: Ascension of the Metatron (2011) – Sariel
- Demons' Score (2012) – David
- Genso Suikoden: Tsumugareshi Hyakunen no Toki (2012) – Zoshiomu
- One Piece: Unlimited World Red (2013) – Caesar Clown
- Saint Seiya: Brave Soldiers (2013) – Kraken Isaac
- Bakumatsu Rock (2014) – Shoin Yoshida
- Chaos Rings III (2014) – Shyamalan
- J-Stars Victory VS (2014) – Frieza
- One Piece: Super Grand Battle! X (2014) – Caesar Clown
- One Piece Kings (2014) – Caesar Clown
- Granblue Fantasy (2014) – Anre (Uno)
- Lego Dimensions (2015) – The Riddler (Japanese dub)
- Star Ocean: Anamnesis (2016) – Coro
- Yakuza 6: The Song of Life (2016) – Katsumi Sugai
- Spider-Man (2018) – Scorpion (Japanese dub)
- Nioh 2 (2020) – Imagawa Yoshimoto
- Valkyrie Elysium (2022) – Fenrir
- Magical Girl Witch Trials (2025) – Gokuchou

=== Tokusatsu ===
- Ultra Q (1966) – Mamoru (ep. 13)
- Denshi Sentai Denjiman (1980) – Go Koyuki (ep. 26)
- Tokusou Sentai Dekaranger (2004) – Rainian Agent Abrella
- Tokusou Sentai Dekaranger The Movie: Full Blast Action (2004) – Rainian Agent Abrella
- Tokusou Sentai Dekaranger vs. Abaranger (2004) – Rainian Agent Abrella
- Ultraman Mebius & Ultraman Brothers (2006) – Alien Nackle
- Kamen Rider Den-O (2007) – Jelly Imagin (eps. 19-20)
- Kamen Rider Kiva (2008) – Ladybug Fangire (eps. 19-20)
- Tensou Sentai Goseiger (2010) – Bugntes Alien Ucyuseruzo of Influenza (ep. 5)
- Kaizoku Sentai Gokaiger the Movie: The Flying Ghost Ship (2011) – Rainian Agent Abrella (eps. 2-50)
- Shuriken Sentai Ninninger (2015) – Masakage Tsugomori (eps. 13-44)

== Dubbing roles ==
=== Live-action films and series Japanese dubbing ===
- And Just Like That... – Steve Brady (David Eigenberg)
- Conan the Barbarian (1989 TV Asahi edition) – Subotai (Gerry Lopez)
- ER – Duncan Stewart (Ewan McGregor)
- G-Force – Speckles (Nicolas Cage)
- The Glenn Miller Story (2000 TV Tokyo edition) – Chummy MacGregor (Harry Morgan)
- Hannibal – Mason Verger (Gary Oldman)
- Lucky Stars Go Places – Long Legs (Anthony Chan)
- Mission: Impossible – Rogue Nation – Solomon Lane (Sean Harris)
- Mission: Impossible – Fallout – Solomon Lane (Sean Harris)
- The Mummy (2002 NTV edition) – Jonathan Carnahan (John Hannah)
- Prisoners (2016 BS Japan edition) – Franklin Birch (Terrence Howard)
- Some Like It Hot (2012 Wowow edition) – Gerald/"Daphne" (Jack Lemmon)
- Wasabi (2004 TV Tokyo edition) – Maurice/Momo (Michel Muller)
- West Side Story (1979 TBS edition) – Chino Martin (Jose De Vega)

=== Animated films and series' Japanese dubbing ===
- Aaahh!!! Real Monsters – Ickis
- Anastasia – Bartok
- Beauty and the Beast: The Enchanted Christmas – Fife
- Dinosaur – Zini
- Donkey Kong Country – Cranky Kong
- The Exploits of Moominpappa: Adventures of a Young Moomin – Sniff, Muddler
- FernGully: The Last Rainforest – Batty Koda
- Hop – Phil
- Lady and the Tramp – Tramp
- Lady and the Tramp II: Scamp's Adventure – Tramp
- Legend of the Three Caballeros – José Carioca
- Mulan – Ling
- Mulan II – Ling
- The Reflection – Jim
- The Road to El Dorado – Miguel
- The Secret Life of Pets – Snowball
- The Secret Life of Pets 2 – Snowball
- Shazzan – Chuck (Under his birthname, Tomoharu Takeo)
- Star Wars: The Clone Wars (film) – Ziro the Hutt
- Star Wars: The Clone Wars (TV) – Ziro the Hutt
- The Swan Princess – Jean-Bob
- The Swan Princess: The Mystery of the Enchanted Kingdom – Jean-Bob
- The Swan Princess II: Escape from Castle Mountain – Jean-Bob
- The Three Caballeros (1994 dub ver) – José Carioca
- Tiny Toon Adventures – Buster Bunny
- Tom and Jerry Tales – Droopy

== Awards ==
| Year | Award | Category | Result | Ref. |
|---|---|---|---|---|
| 2016 | 25th Japanese Film Critics Awards | Best Voice Actor | Won | |
| 2017 | 11th Seiyu Awards | Kei Tomiyama Memorial Award | Won | |
