= Mayuri Kurotsuchi =

Fictional character from Bleach

- Bleach character
- Mayuri Kurotsuchi as depicted on the cover for Chapter 123
- First appearance: Bleach chapter 81: "Twelve Tone Rendezvous" (2003)
- Created by: Tite Kubo
- Voiced by: Japanese; Ryusei Nakao; English; Terrence Stone

In-universe information
- Species: Soul Reaper
- Relatives: Nemu Kurotsuchi (created daughter, deceased); Nemuri Hachigō (created daughter)

Mayuri Kurotsuchi (Japanese: 涅 マユリ, Hepburn: Kurotsuchi Mayuri) is a fictional character in the Bleach anime and manga created by Tite Kubo. He is the current captain of the 12th Division of the Gotei 13 and overseer of the Soul Reapers' Research and Development Institute.

== History ==
110 years prior to the series, Mayuri was an inmate in the Maggots Nest, the only one dangerous enough to be chained behind bars for his utter lack of regard for life when it comes to experimentation. Mayuri is eventually visited by Kisuke Urahara and his lieutenant Hiyori Sarugaki, the former offering Mayuri a position in the SRDI. After initially refusing being Urahara's assistant, Mayuri accepts when Urahara points out that Mayuri would be his successor should anything happen to him. Nine years after his release, Urahara and Hiyori are forced to leave the Soul Society, leading to Mayuri's promotion to captain of Squad 12. As the result of the fifth experiment in his life-creating Nemuri Project while later taking the seventh surviving experiment, Nemu Kurotsuchi, to be his lieutenant and lab assistant while pretending to be uncaring towards her to hide his joy of creating a fully stable artificial life form. During this time, Mayuri experimented on Quincies, including Soken Ishida, the grandfather and trainer of Uryū Ishida CAPTAIN MAYURI

== Plot overview ==
When Ichigo and his allies entered the Soul Society, Mayuri aided in the search for the Ryoka and found Orihime Inoue and Uryū. Orihime escaped and Mayuri reluctantly fights Uryū, seeing no need to study Quincies any further. Uryu is initially too weak to fight Mayuri until the Soul Reaper revealed that he experimented on Soken Ishida which his opponent unlocking his full Quincy powers prior to escaping. Mayuri remained on the sidelines for the duration of the search out of disinterest, after he learns of Sosuke Aizen's betrayal.

Later, Mayuri, Byakuya Kuchiki, Kenpachi Zaraki, Retsu Unohana and their subordinates head to Hueco Mundo. He saves Uryū and Renji Abarai from Szayel Aporro Granz, having an advantage against the Espada due to a bacterium he implanted in Uryū during their last fight that analyzed Szayelaporro's abilities. After defeating his controlled Zanpakuto while his opponent uses Nemu's body to reconstitute himself, Mayuri felt disappointed by the Arrancar's claims to have become a perfect being. As Szayelaporro's new body is paralyzed from exposure to one of the serums in Nemu's body dubbed the Superhuman Drug, Mayuri very slowly kills him while giving him a lecture on why scientists shouldn't claim or even want perfection. Soon after, Mayuri investigates Szayelaporro's laboratory to take what he can for his research before healing Uryū and Renji, followed by sending Ichigo Kurosaki and Unohana through the Garganta to the Fake Karakura Town. While explaining to Byakuya that he is more interested in seeing what specimens Hueco Mundo offers to him, Mayuri notes that he does have faith in Ichigo's ability to end the war. Once the fight against Aizen is settled, Mayuri attempts to seal off the Fake Karakura Town with their allies still inside but is stopped by his subordinates.

Almost a year later, Mayuri appears at a captain's meeting where he and Akon explain what they know about the Quincy group known as the Wandereich. Furthermore, Mayuri confirms that he ordered his squad to slaughter the 28,000 people in the Rukon to stabilize the Wandereich slaughtering Hollows while getting into a debate with Head Captain Yamamoto Genryusai over whose fault that such a deed needed to be carried out. Mayuri is further livid during the Wandereich's attack on the Soul Society when his fellow captains' lost their Bankai as a result of deciding to act on their own before he could completed his analysis on the enemy. Following the first invasion, meeting with Ichigo to discuss his broken Zangetsu, Mayuri locked himself away to continue his research on the Wandereich's Bankai stealing abilities with Urahara offering his assistance on the matter to develop a countermeasure to give the Soul Reaper captains who lost their Bankai an advantage. During the second Wandenreich invasion, Mayuri personally gets involved once interested in the abilities of Giselle Gewelle to turn living Soul Reapers into her zombie slaves while unveiling his own personal fighting team in the revived Arrancars Dordoni Alessandro Del Socaccio, Cirucci Sanderwicci, Luppi Antenor, and Charlotte Chuhlhourne. When Toshiro Hitsugaya appears as Giselle's zombie slave, Mayuri takes on the fellow Soul Reaper captain with the intent to test some of his serums on the youth. But by the time the zombified Rose, Kensei, and Rangiku arrive after Hitsugaya's defeat, Mayuri revealed that he devised a serum to alter the blood of the zombified Soul Reapers so they can only obey him. After having Giselle killed, while restoring Hitsugaya and Rangiku to normal, Mayuri takes Rose and Kensei to aid Byakuya in his fight against PePe Waccabrada.

When Yhwach absorbed the Soul King's power, Mayuri and Kenpachi come across Pernida Parnkgjas in the transformed Royal Realm. After Pernida defeats Kenpachi, deeming the mysterious Wandenreich to be creepy for even him, Mayuri finds himself in a battle for his life after Perinda reveals himself to be the left arm of the Soul King. After his attempt to defeat Perinda with a variation of his Konjiki Ashisogi Jizō failed, realizing the arm is constantly evolving, Mayuri finds himself being protected by Nemu before she throws him over to a nearby building to watch her fight with the arm unfold. Though Nemu dies while having visions of being taunted by Szayelaporro, Mayuri saves his creation's brain from being eaten by Perinda so the Quincy would die an antagonizing death from her cellular makeup. In the series epilogue, Mayuri created a new Nemu.

== Abilities ==
His greatest ability is his scientific intellect. He's able to think many steps ahead of his opponents and has created numerous inventions to aid him in battle. He is also a master of Kido and has a very high level of Reiatsu.

=== Zanpakutō ===
His Zanpakutō is Ashisogi Jizō (疋殺地蔵; "Animal killing Ksitigarbha", translated in other ways). When released with the command "Claw Out" (掻き毟れ, kakimushire), Ashisogi Jizō's blade transforms into a deformed trident head. When it stabs an opponent, it emits a poison that severs the nerve signals that control limb movement, paralyzing that limb regardless of where it was struck. However, unlike normal paralysis, the affected area is still able to feel pain, something which is rather fitting for Mayuri's demented tendencies. Ashisogi Jizō's bankai, named Konjiki Ashisogi Jizō (金色疋殺地蔵; "Gold Animal killing Ksitigarbha", translated in the English manga as "divine leg-cutting Buddha"), takes the form of a giant caterpillar with a baby's head and a silver halo. The creature breathes a poisonous derivative of Mayuri's blood which is lethal to anyone who breathes it, aside from himself and Nemu. It can also run through and skewer opponents with the multiple blades that erupt from its chest. Mayuri has physically modified his bankai so that it will self-destruct and return to its sealed state if it attacks him. It is also shown that Mayuri changes the poison he uses every time he shows his bankai. During his fight against Pernida, Mayuri reveals an alternate bankai called Konjiki Ashisogi Jizō: Makai Fukuin Shōtai, which is an enormous overweight infant-like creature that gives birth to a Konjiki Ashisogi Jizō specially designed to Mayuri's specifications against a certain opponent.

Ashisogi Jizo appears as a free Zanpakutō spirit in the Zanpakutō Unknown Tales anime arc as a small, baby-like creature with butterfly wings. As a final defensive measure, Mayuri can reduce himself to liquid form for three days by stabbing himself with his Zanpakutō. This leaves him unable to attack or be attacked, making it a very effective escape tool.

== Other media ==
He appears in almost every video games as a playable character and was in the first three Bleach films. In Bleach: The DiamondDust Rebellion, Byakuya, Jushiro Ukitake and Shunsui Kyoraku go to his lab to ask him if it's possible for people to have the same Zanpakuto. In Bleach: Fade to Black his lab is attacked and he is driven insane, with Nemu, the rest of Squad 12 and Kenpachi trying to get him under control before they're engulfed by a white liquid from one of the machines in his laboratory.

== Reception ==
Mayuri ranked 28th place in the 3rd popularity poll. His fight with Uryu was ranked 8th place in the Bleach Best Bout. His sword, Ashi Sogi Jizo was the 26th ranked zanpakuto in the 5th poll. Mayuri has appeared in much merchandise including key chains, arm bands, and action figures.

Carlo Santos of Anime News Network said that there was "a certain amount of ridiculousness" in watching Szayelapporo Granz and Mayuri try to get the upper hand on each other during their fight. However, he went on to say that Mayuri finishing the battle was a "wonderfully jaw-dropping conclusion" to Volume 34. D.F. Smith of IGN.com praised Terrence Stone's voice acting and noted that it's "more than weird enough to match the character." Bryce Coulter characterized Mayuri as sinister, twisted and pragmatic. He also said that he was a creepy old man and an absolute freak, but an empirical scientist at heart.
