= Magical Girl Witch Trials =

- Title art, featuring Sakuraba Ema
- Developers: Re,AER
- Publishers: Acacia; Circle Line Games (Chinese countries)
- Artist: Umemaro
- Writer: Acacia
- Composer: SLAVE.V-V-R
- Engine: Unity
- Platforms: Microsoft Windows; Nintendo Switch
- Release: Windows; July 18, 2025; Nintendo Switch; July 9, 2026
- Genres: Mystery adventure, visual novel, psychological horror
- Mode: Single-player

Magical Girl Witch Trials (Japanese: 魔法少女ノ魔女裁判, Hepburn: Mahō Shōjo no Majo Saiban), abbreviated as Manosaba (Japanese: まのさば), is a 2025 psychological horror mystery adventure game from scenario-writing company Re,AER.

The game was developed by Acacia, a creative brand under Re,AER and published by Acacia and Circle Line Games, featuring gothic visuals and a dark magical girl theme. Its narrative primarily follows the female protagonists Sakuraba Ema (桜羽 エマ, overall lead) and Nikaidō Hiro (二階堂 ヒロ, second-chapter lead).

Sakuraba Ema and Nikaidō Hiro alongside 11 other girls are imprisoned within a prison house on a remote island after having been identified as potential "witches"—beings who possess a strong instinct for murder. Through a series of witch trials, the captives must uncover and execute the murderous witch among them to survive.

Following a 2024 successful crowdfunding campaign, the game got full voice acting and attracted attention in the Japanese online community. It went on to launch for PC (through Valve Corporation's Steam) on July 18, 2025, and for the Nintendo Switch on July 9, 2026.

Magical Girl Witch Trials was a commercial success and earned positive reviews for its characterization, storyline, and artwork. A manga adaptation began serialization in August 2025. Two games that partially related to the game, Mahō Shōjo no Inshū Mura and The Streamer's Alt Account Labyrinth, are scheduled to be released in 2026.

== Gameplay ==
The Witch Trial phase, where there is an option to object to a claim made

Magical Girl Witch Trials is a mystery adventure game in which players first see events in the perspective of Sakuraba Ema, and then from that of Nikaidō Hiro in the second part of the story. The gameplay is similar to Danganronpa in flow, wherein each chapter consists of a murder, an investigation phase, a trial, and the execution of the culprit. As in Danganronpa, the player can target specific statements in characters' arguments.

The gameplay comes in cycles of four phases. In the first phase, the story continues with the magical girls interacting with each other. The character the player controls can choose rooms to go to, where a set of stories will play. During the dialogues, the controlled character may be prompted to choose an action to take out of two or more choices, in which all but one of the choices leads to a bad ending. In the second phase, one of the magical girls is found murdered by another, and the player searches for clues and collects testimonies. In the third phase, a Witch Trial is held to identify the murderer. There is a time limit on how many times dialogues can be repeated, and taking too much time results in a game over. During this phase, the player has to actively interact with the trial to point out lies and inaccuracies, or the wrong magical girl will be executed, and the protagonist will die in various ways after the wrongful execution. The magical girl found guilty will be executed, and the gameplay reaches phase four, which directly connects with the first phase. The gameplay repeats until the scripted story reaches an end.

== Synopsis ==
Hoping to leave behind a history of middle-school bullying and start fresh in high school, Sakuraba Ema instead awakens in a cold prison cell alongside Nikaidō Hiro, a former friend whose relationship with Ema has soured for reasons Ema can no longer recall. They are among 13 girls detained by a mysterious Warden, who reveals that they are potential witches whose latent powers threaten humanity. The prison is designed to turn them into immortal witches, granting them immense power paired with an uncontrollable urge to kill. Following each murder, a Witch Trial is held; the guilty party is executed. As witches cannot die from physical trauma, they become an "Immortal Remain" with superhuman strength and regeneration. The cycle begins in blood when Hiro attempts to kill the prison guard, a remain, and is immediately beheaded by it. Ema eventually stands as one of the last survivors alongside Hikami Meruru. Meruru reveals herself as the prison's mastermind, a fake prisoner searching for a "Great Witch" hidden in the human world. She shows Ema a photograph of the target: Tsukishiro Yuki, which Ema recognizes as her middle school friend. She realizes her history of being bullied was a psychological fabrication created to mask her guilt for standing by while Yuki was the true victim. The trauma of this revelation awakens Ema's true magic—the power to kill witches—which she uses to destroy the world in a fit of despair.

As the credits roll, time abruptly rewinds. The game switches to Hiro's perspective. Hiro wakes in the cell, retaining the memories of her own execution. Her hidden magic, Death Rewinding, has been triggered. It is revealed that she distanced herself from Ema because Ema stood by as a bystander while their friend Yuki was bullied into suicide. As Hiro navigates a new series of murders—where even Meruru falls victim—she begins to succumb to the "witch transformation" brought on by psychological stress. However, Hiro discovers a darker truth: Yuki was not a passive victim. She intentionally invited abuse to traumatize Ema and Hiro, poisoning their friendship as part of a grander scheme to spread "witch elements" and eradicate humanity. To stop this, Hiro learns she must summon Yuki by turning all 13 girls into witches for a final ceremony. Enduring unbearable mental pressure, Hiro commits suicide to reset the timeline once more, utilizing her strengthened powers to return to the very first day.

Hiro awakens as a near-complete witch, barely suppressing her homicidal urges. Foregoing the "game", she demands an immediate Witch Trial. During the proceedings, she systematically exposes the deep-seated traumas of the other girls, forcing them to confront their inner darkness and complete their transformations. The ceremony successfully summons Yuki from the ashes. Yuki reveals her motive: she is the last "Native Witch" seeking revenge for the human persecution of her kind. She intends to trigger a global "witch-killing" spell to wipe out the human race. In a final confrontation, the girls manage to reach Yuki's heart, persuading her to abandon her vengeance and retract the witch elements from the world. Yuki chooses to end her own life, with Meruru following her into death. With the curse lifted, the prisoners and the "Remains" regain their humanity and are finally allowed to leave the prison.

== Development ==
The development of the game was partially funded by crowdfunding via CAMPFIRE, which aimed to increase the quality of the game. The crowdfunding began on April 19, 2024 and lasted until the end of June. It attracted attention on the Japanese internet and reached the initial target of 2 million yen within about an hour and a half after launching. It also met all the newly set stretch goals. Eventually, the crowdfunding reached approximately 66.8 million yen, 33.4 times the amount needed, and the game received full voice acting as a result. Among the voice actors for the characters is Ryūsei Nakao, who has voiced Frieza. The development team has cited Puella Magi Madoka Magica, Danganronpa and Steins;Gate as inspiration.

== Reception ==
Since its release, Magical Girl Witch Trials has received widespread acclaim for the characters' designs and the quality of artworks, rapidly gaining popularity in Japan and the Chinese-speaking world. The livestreaming by online streamers further contributed to the game's popularity on social media. Reviewers for the Japanese gaming magazine Famitsu positively noted the unique characteristics of the girls, which made it easy to remember them. They also noted the guiltiness and satisfaction from the gameplay. A reviewer for Dengeki Online noted that the game properly reveals the details of characters who die early into the game, which is rare for death game scenarios. They also praised the emotional storyline and noted that they were immersed in the gameplay. On the other hand, Automation Media stated the absence of mini-games or failure penalties during trials allows players to focus entirely on the narrative. The reviewer also praised the voice performances and duality of the characters. In a 2025 reader survey by Den Faminico Gamer, Magical Girl Witch Trial was the second recommended game of the year.

The Steam version of the game was the second best-selling game in Japan after its release, and later rose to number one in the rankings on July 25. As of August 2026, it had sold over 700,000 units on the platform. An Internet meme dubbed the "Aburi Bin" (Japanese: 炙りビン; lit. Roasted Bottle) is popular on Japanese social media platforms, which originated from a line spoken by Ema after the player made a wrong choice.

The game was nominated for "Best Adventure Game" and "Best Indie Game" at the Famitsu Game Awards 2025. In 2026, the series ranked first place in the Dengeki Online Reader's Top 10 Most Desired Game to Anime Adaptations. During the "Dengeki Indie Game Awards 2026", the game was voted as the top adventure game.

== Related media ==
A reading play of the game was performed at Sunpearl Arakawa on May 10, 2025. Its CD will be released on April 22, 2026. A manga adaptation written by Acacia and illustrated by Tokitō Setsuna was launched on August 28, 2025. Nikaidō Hiro, one of the characters in the game, was confirmed to make an appearance in the spin-off games Mahō Shōjo no Inshū Mura and The Streamer's Alt Account Labyrinth in development by Acacia.
