= Bleach: Fade to Black =

2008 film by Noriyuki Abe

- Japanese theatrical release poster

Japanese name
- Kanji: 劇場版BLEACH Fade to Black 君の名を呼ぶ
Transcriptions
- Revised Hepburn: Gekijō-ban Burīchi Feido tõ Burakku Kimi no Na o Yobu
- Directed by: Noriyuki Abe
- Written by: Natsuko Takahashi; Masahiro Ōkubo
- Based on: Bleach by Tite Kubo
- Produced by: Shunji Aoki; Mikihiko Fukazawa; Ken Hagino
- Starring: Masakazu Morita; Fumiko Orikasa; Aya Hirano; Hiroshi Kamiya
- Cinematography: Toshiyuki Fukushima
- Edited by: Hidetoshi Okuda; Junichi Uematsu
- Music by: Shirō Sagisu
- Production company: Studio Pierrot
- Distributed by: Toho
- Release date: December 13, 2008
- Running time: 95 minutes
- Country: Japan
- Language: Japanese
- Box office: ¥700 million (Japan)

Bleach: Fade to Black (Japanese: 劇場版BLEACH Fade to Black 君の名を呼ぶ, Hepburn: Gekijō-ban Burīchi Feido tō Burakku Kimi no Na o Yobu; lit. "Theatrical Feature Bleach: Fade to Black, I Call Your Name") is a 2008 Japanese animated supernatural adventure film and the third animated film adaptation of the anime and manga series Bleach. In the film, Ichigo Kurosaki enters the Soul Society once more in order to save Rukia Kuchiki, who has been kidnapped by two spirits who have a history with Rukia. They also erase her memories along with the Gotei 13, who now turn against Ichigo. Directed by Noriyuki Abe, the film premiered in Japan on December 13, 2008 (in between episodes 198 and 199), later to be released in the United States. The film's theme music is "Koyoi, Tsuki ga Miezutomo", performed by Porno Graffitti and its screenplay was written by Natsuko Takahashi and Masahiro Ōkubo. The DVD was released on September 30, 2009, in Japan, with additional footage of Ichigo, Rukia and Kon leaving for the World of the Living. The English dub was released on DVD and Blu-ray on November 15, 2011, in the United States and on May 28, 2012, in the United Kingdom.

== Plot ==
In the Soul Society, Soul Reaper (Note: In the Bleach universe, Soul Reapers are soldiers trusted with ushering the souls of the dead from the World of the Living to the afterlife realm known as Soul Society and with fighting Hollows, monstrous lost souls who can harm both ghosts and humans) scientist Mayuri Kurotsuchi, is ambushed and attacked in his laboratory by a pair of mysterious siblings, wielding an amnesiac scythe. In a frightened panic, Kurotsuchi damages one of his machines, causing a massive spirit energy explosion that covers much of Soul Society, killing or freezing many Soul Reapers. Rukia Kuchiki is the next to be attacked by the siblings, erasing her memories and those of everybody that has memories of her, and is carried away to Soul Society's Rukon District by the siblings.

In the real world, one of Rukia's friends, Substitute Soul Reaper Ichigo Kurosaki, briefly forgets her but Kon, being a modified soul, is unaffected by the memory wipe and reminds him. Ichigo and Kon go to former Soul Reaper Kisuke Urahara for information; but Urahara does not remember Rukia. Ichigo and Kon travel to the Soul Society with all the captains unable to remember Ichigo, believing him to be a threat. Meanwhile, Rukia wakes up in the Rukon District with no memory of being a Soul Reaper. The nameless siblings, a sister and a brother, remind Rukia that they used to be close friends living together and she was to give them names, although she has forgotten them. Ichigo seeks the help of Rukia's adopted brother, Byakuya, but he does not remember Rukia either. After another confronting with Renji Abarai, Rukia's childhood friend, Byakuya directs Ichigo to his wife, Hisana's, birthplace, where they are briefly reunited with Rukia before the siblings flee with her from Ichigo and Kon.

Ichigo and Kon are attacked again by other Soul Reapers, but are saved by Renji Abarai, who follows his instinct to trust Ichigo. When Soul Society's head-captain and other captains arrive to capture Ichigo, Urahara interferes. He sends Ichigo, Renji and Kon off to save Rukia, and explains to the captains that he studied a parasitic Hollow which could erase memories with its scythe-like tentacle, but it escaped and appears to be influencing the siblings' actions to an extent. Meanwhile, the siblings go to Kurotsuchi's laboratory to fully destroy the Soul Reapers with another spiritual machine of Kurotsuchi's, under the belief that the Soul Reapers were responsible for taking Rukia away from them when they were younger. Rukia suddenly objects to this, and Ichigo and Renji's arrival prompts her to remember them and her entire past, with both the siblings and her time as a Soul Reaper. The female sibling succumbs to rage, and she forces herself, her brother and Rukia to all fuse into one, creating "Dark Rukia".

Dark Rukia, seemingly hollowfied, unleashes the machine upon Soul Society before battling Ichigo. The machine takes the form of a monster, and the Soul Reapers fight against it. Ichigo fights Dark Rukia and holds back initially to refrain from injuring her. Byakuya arrives and claims that he should be the one to finish this, but Ichigo intervenes and manages to free her with his own similar spirit energy, destroying the Hollow; Byakuya and Renji also destroy the monster. Rukia regains her memories, but the siblings are left mortally wounded, though they are regretful for their actions. Urahara arrives and explains that the Hollow attacked Rukia and the siblings while controlling a Soul Reaper's body previously, but when the body was destroyed, the siblings trapped the Hollow in their bodies and were sent to Hueco Mundo—the Hollow's world—for a time, managing to escape to reunite with Rukia because of their desire to be with her. Rukia tells the siblings their names, Homura and Shizuku, but the two die from their wounds, much to Rukia's despair. Later, Ichigo asks Rukia at the hill shrine where she previously visited before, about the shrines were made in remembrance of her childhood friends who died during adolescence due to poverty, reminding her that her memories of the siblings will not fade.

== Cast ==
Character	Japanese voice actor	English voice actor
Ichigo Kurosaki	Masakazu Morita	Johnny Yong Bosch
Rukia Kuchiki	Fumiko Orikasa	Michelle Ruff
Homura	Aya Hirano	Laura Bailey
Shizuku	Hiroshi Kamiya	Richard Cansino
Renji Abarai	Kentarō Itō	Wally Wingert
Byakuya Kuchiki	Ryōtarō Okiayu	Dan Woren
Kisuke Urahara	Shin-ichiro Miki	Michael Lindsay
Mayuri Kurotsuchi	Ryūsei Nakao	Terrence Stone
Kon	Mitsuaki Madono	Quinton Flynn
Dark Rukia	Fumiko Orikasa; Aya Hirano; Hiroshi Kamiya	Michelle Ruff; Laura Bailey; Richard Cansino

== Other media ==
A light novel adaptation of movie was published on December 15, 2008. The story and characters made an appearance in the game Bleach: Brave Souls.

== Reception ==
The film opened in second or third place at the Japanese box office (sources vary) and held a top ten location until its fifth week.
