= List of Ayakashi Triangle characters =

The main characters of Ayakashi Triangle. Matsuri is in the center, surrounded by (clockwise from top) Lucy, Suzu, Garaku, Shirogane, Soga, Ponosuke, and Yayoi

The manga series Ayakashi Triangle features a cast of characters created by Kentaro Yabuki. The story follows exorcist ninja Matsuri Kazamaki, as he tries to defend his childhood friend and love interest, the Ayakashi Medium Suzu Kanade, from evil spirits called ayakashi. During a battle to save Suzu's life, Matsuri is turned into a girl after being cursed by Shirogane, the King of Ayakashi. With no apparent way to reverse the transformation, Matsuri is forced to live publicly as a girl as he and Suzu deal with both the friendly and the malicious ayakashi they encounter as well as their growing romantic feelings for each other, all while trying to break Matsuri's curse for him to return to his original male body.

== Main characters ==
=== Matsuri Kazamaki ===
Voiced by: Hiromu Mineta (male), Yūki Kyōka (female) (vomic); Shōya Chiba (male), Miyu Tomita (female) (anime)

Matsuri Kazamaki (風巻 祭里, Kazamaki Matsuri) is the main male protagonist of the series. He is a young exorcist ninja from the Kazamaki clan, specializing in Wind Jutsu. He is currently training to take over his grandfather's position as the head of the clan. Matsuri is a carefree person in all areas, but very responsible when it comes to acting as an exorcist ninja, apart from having a great talent for this. When he was young, Matsuri used to be afraid of ayakashi, until he met Suzu Kanade, a beautiful girl who, like him, was also able to see ayakashi; witnessing Suzu interacting with them led Matsuri to overcome his fear and developing a kind of admiration, while also falling in love with her. Furthermore, he is very strict in terms of protecting Suzu, due to her carelessness in trusting ayakashi too much. At the beginning of the series, Matsuri appears as a boy with dark red hair, but when he seals away most of Shirogane's power into a scroll, the King of Ayakashi turns Matsuri into a silver-haired girl.

Matsuri struggles to fit in with his new life, though he slowly begins to befriend Suzu's friends, Yayo and Lucy. He is initially very resolute in his mission to protect Suzu, and maintains a grudge against various Ayakashi, but eventually overcomes these feelings when he is reunited with various ayakashi he and Suzu had befriended as children.

He is a master of various wind-based techniques, with one of his primary skills being the ability to dispel a possession with the use of his Pinwheel, allowing him to leave the hosts unharmed. After having his techniques temporarily sealed away by Garaku, he masters the "Inner Wind" technique, allowing him to strike Ayakashi with great force, as well as dispel possessions within himself.

=== Suzu Kanade ===
Voiced by: Saya Aizawa (vomic), Kana Ichinose (anime)

Suzu Kanade (花奏 すず, Kanade Suzu) is the main female protagonist of the series. Suzu loves to play with ayakashi, considering them adorable. However, the fact that she trusts them so much makes her put herself in dangerous situations many times. These situations are due to her being an Ayakashi Medium, a human being with an excess of vital energy and therefore attracts Ayakashi. Suzu is a childhood friend of Matsuri, for whom she has a crush on, even after he is turned into a girl.

She is shown to be very trusting of Ayakashi, often attempting to make peace with them when they cause disasters in the area, and finding herself saddened when they are struck down. Resolving to become stronger and independent, she learns several techniques through Garaku; her primary ability being to make an "Omokage", a copy of herself which she can control remotely, as well as channeling her excess vital energy into origami, allowing her to use them as projectiles to hit foes at range.

=== Shirogane ===
Voiced by: Mitsuteru Nagato (cat); Hikaru Fujikura (ayakashi) (vomic), Tesshō Genda (anime)

Shirogane (シロガネ) is the King of Ayakashi. Although his true form is that of a gigantic feline, when he suppresses his power he appears as an overweight cat wearing a bib; a form he gets stuck in when most of his powers are sealed into a scroll by Matsuri. Shirogane wants to devour Suzu to gain more power.

== Ninokuru clan ==
=== Soga Ninokuru ===
Voiced by: Shōya Ishige (anime)

Soga Ninokuru (二ノ曲 宗牙, Ninokuru Sōga) is an exorcist ninja from the Ninokuru clan, known for his tremendous speed. Soga met Matsuri on a mission long before the events of the series, where he underestimated him at first, but after seeing his skills, he came to regard him as his rival and friend. Soga first appears when he is transferred to Hokusai High School (北彩高校, Hokusai kōkō), where he intends to kill Shirogane, but is prevented by Matsuri in the end, and Soga leaves the matter in her hands. He is a serious and very cold person, but acts tremendously flustered in front of women, even Matsuri, who despite knowing that she was originally a boy, has to remember this in many situations in order not to be nervous in front of her; both have a good relationship, where they even help each other in battles.

=== Haya Ninokuru ===
Voiced by: Minami Takayama

Haya Ninokuru (二ノ曲 刃夜, Ninokuru Haya) is a female exorcist ninja apprentice from the Ninokuru clan and the younger sister of Soga. She looks up to her older brother and idolize him. She wants to fix his one weakness and make it so that he doesn't get flustered around girls. Meeting Matsuri, she now views the older girl as her future sister-in-law.

=== Muga Ninokuru ===
Voiced by: Koutaro Tanaka

Muga Ninokuru (二ノ曲 武牙, Ninokuru Muga) is Soga's father and the current head of the Ninokuru exorcist ninja clan.

=== Ponosuke Ninokuru ===
Voiced by: Satomi Arai (anime)

Ponosuke Ninokuru (二ノ曲 ポ之助, Ninokuru Ponosuke) is a humanoid pigeon ayakashi that serves the Ninokuru clan, working directly under Soga, to whom he is deeply loyal because Soga once saved him from being devoured by a cat.

== Hokusai High School ==
=== Yayoi Toba ===
Voiced by: Kanon Endō (vomic), Haruka Tomatsu (anime)

Yayoi Toba (鳥羽 弥生, Toba Yayoi), nicknamed "Yayo" (ヤヨ), is a classmate of Matsuri and Suzu who, along with Lu, has been friends with the latter since middle school, and neither she nor Lu know that Matsuri is actually a boy. She is energetic, cheerful and somewhat noisy, yet she is one of the most studious students of Hokusai High School. She is also in the habit of Sexual harassment Suzu and other girls, groping many parts of their bodies against their will, something that really bothers Matsuri, which makes Yayo think that he doesn't like her, until both clear up their emotions and continue to be friends.

=== Lucy Tsukioka ===
Voiced by: Yuka Nukui (vomic), Hina Kino (anime)

Lucy Tsukioka (月丘 ルーシー, Tsukioka Rūshī), nicknamed "Lu" (ルー, Rū), is a classmate of Matsuri and Suzu who, along with Yayo, has been friends with the latter since middle school, and neither she nor Yayo know that Matsuri is actually a boy. Being partly foreign and from a wealthy family, she is obsessed with otaku culture and the supernatural, and although she is somewhat shy and quiet, Lu is actually a cell phone and social media addict, taking and then posting pictures of whatever she deems "postworthy." A running gag is that she is obsessed with alien conspiracy theories to the point that when Matsuri and Suzu finally tell their friends about the ayakashi, she refuses to believe them, attributing any supernatural phenomenon to alien activity.

=== Masurao Sujimori ===
Voiced by: Ryō Morita (vomic)

Masurao Sujimori (筋森 益荒男, Sujimori Masurao) is a former mercenary who is now the English teacher at Hokusai High School.

== Ayakashi ==
=== Human-faced Spider ===
Voiced by: Ryō Morita (vomic)

The Human-faced Spider (人面蜘蛛, Jinmen gumo) is a skeletal, spider-like ayakashi that causes car accidents on a country road until Matsuri exorcises him in the first chapter.

=== Tadare ===
Voiced by: Tomokazu Seki

Tadare (襴) is an oni-like ayakashi that was sealed in Mount Giboshi (ギボシ山, Giboshi yama) almost two hundred years prior to the events of the series, until Shirogane broke the seal that held him in the hope of recruiting him as a minion. Instead, Tadare betrays him when he realizes he could become the new King of Ayakashi by eating Suzu, but is easily defeated by Matsuri.

=== Garaku Utagawa ===
Garaku Utagawa (歌川 画楽, Utagawa Garaku) is a famous painter in the human world, but in reality, he is not human, but an ayakashi with human-like features who has existed since the Edo period. Garaku likes to spend time painting, in addition to loving cats, which is why he considers himself a follower of Shirogane and is very affectionate with him, much to the cat's irritation.

=== Omokage Shadow ===
An Omokage Shadow (オモカゲ, Omokage) is an ayakashi capable of becoming a duplicate of a living person, being visible even to normal humans. An Omokage has no personality of its own and its sole purpose is to satisfy the desire of the human being it is personifying.

=== Ikon ===
Ikon (異魂) are a recurring type of ayakashi made of negative human thoughts, which proliferate by taking haku from humans and other ayakashi. Eventually, they begin to mutate into solid forms with human-like features called Iyo (異妖), with some becoming outright humanoid, the Jinyo (人妖, Nin'yō).

=== Sosuke Hinojiki ===
Sosuke Hinojiki (日喰 想介, Hinojiki Sōsuke) is a Jinyo born from an Ikon. He introduces himself to Suzu as another human who can see ayakashi, and asks her to heal an injured one he found. Once she does it, Sosuke eats the healed ayakashi, revealing it was all a trick to taste Suzu's haku and feed on her power, but he is ultimately destroyed by the combined efforts of Matsuri and Shirogane.

=== Bottle-nosed Roller ===
Bottle-nosed Roller (とっくり転がし, Tokkuri Korogashi) is a low-ranking ayakashi that looks like a small bottle of sake with eyeballs. It is not harmful, but has the problematic habit of appearing out of nowhere, causing humans to trip over it and fall.

=== Tanumaro ===
Tanumaro (タヌマロ) is an ayakashi whose appearance is a mixture of tanuki and kettle. He is able to release a cloud of steam capable of trapping people in uncomfortable illusions, although he does not control what they will see. Years prior, Tanumaro was one of many ayakashi Suzu and Matsuri befriended, until the latter drove him away when he began suspecting every ayakashi is a threat to her. In the present, when Suzu becomes the new King of Ayakashi, Tanumaro rejects her and traps Matsuri in an illusion, as he believes humans and ayakashi can't live together, but the duo manage to convince him otherwise. In the end, Tanumaro makes peace with Matsuri and accepts Suzu as the new King of Ayakashi.

=== Chochi ===
Chochi (チョッチー, Chotchī) is a mischievous ayakashi that looks like a paper lantern with a face.

== Other characters ==
=== Seigen Kazamaki ===
Voiced by: Shohei Tokiwa (vomic)

Seigen Kazamaki (風巻 清弦, Kazamaki Seigen) is Matsuri's grandfather, his mentor, and the current head of the Kazamaki clan.

=== Reo Korogi ===
Voiced by: Eiko Yamada

Reo Korogi (香炉木 恋緒, Kōrogi Reo) is an exorcist ninja who also happens to be an artisan, making and maintaining equipment out of her family's toy store. She makes, repairs, and modifies equipment used by exorcist ninja, including ninja suits, training robots and other things. She treats her job with a huge amount of enthusiasm, and is even happy when her equipment breaks, because that just lets her build it again but better.

=== Shishimaru Korogi ===
Voiced by: Tetsuo Kurata

Shishimaru Korogi (香炉木 獅子丸, Kōrogi Shishimaru) is Reo's father, who trained her to be an artisan. While acknowledging his daughter's talent, he still sees her as just an apprentice.

=== Ritta Kanade ===
Voiced by: Junko Takeuchi

Ritta Kanade (花奏 律太, Kanade Ritta) is Suzu's younger brother, who is unaware Matsuri is actually a boy and develops a crush on him in his female form.

=== Mr. and Mrs. Kanade ===
Mr. and Mrs. Kanade are the parents of Suzu and Ritta. The couple runs a café called Melody Bell. The mother has a cheerful and friendly personality, while the father is calm but a little worried.
