= Beast King GoLion =

1981 anime series

- Golion US DVD cover from Media Blasters

百獣王ゴライオン (Hyaku Jūō Goraion)
- Genre: Mecha, post-apocalyptic
- Created by: Saburō Yatsude
- Anime television series
- Directed by: Katsuhiko Taguchi
- Produced by: Itaru Orita
- Written by: Susumu Takaku
- Music by: Masahisa Takeichi
- Studio: Tokyo Dōga (Note: Animation studio); Toei Company (Note: Production company)
- Licensed by: US: Media Blasters
- Original network: Tokyo Channel 12
- Original run: March 4, 1981 – February 24, 1982
- Episodes: 52
- Manga
- Written by: Yoshiki Tsuchiyama
- Published by: Tokuma Shoten
- Magazine: TV Land
- Original run: April 1981 – February 1982

Beast King GoLion (百獣王ゴライオン, Hyaku Jūō Goraion; The King of Hundred Beasts GoLion) is a Japanese super mecha anime television series that aired from 1981 to 1982. The animation from GoLion was edited and trimmed to create the American series Voltron: Defender of the Universe, with new names and dialogue. In 2008, GoLion was released on Region 1 DVD in three volumes. To coincide with the anime's original run, a manga adaptation by Yoshiki Tsuchiyama was serialized in Televi-Land.

== Story ==
GoLion's story is set in 1999, when the planet Altea is subdued and enslaved by the Galra Empire. Meanwhile, five space pilots (Akira Kogane, Takashi Shirogane, Isamu Kurogane, Tsuyoshi Seidou and Hiroshi Suzuichi) return to Earth from their latest space exploration, only to find the planet annihilated by World War III. Suddenly, the explorers are ambushed, captured, and enslaved by a Galra Ship. They are then forced to fight for their lives in Emperor Daibazaal's arena.

The young pilots escape and eventually land on the planet Altea, where they discover the secret of the mighty sentient robot GoLion, the only weapon powerful enough to defeat Emperor Daibazaal's forces. Thousands of years ago, GoLion was an arrogant robot who, after defeating several Beastmen, tried to challenge the goddess of the universe into battle, but failed. For GoLion's hubris, the goddess taught him humility by separating him into five pieces in the form of five lion robots that sailed through space and crash-landed on Altea, to lay in wait for those who would one day reawaken him to fight evil once again. The Princess of Altea, Farla, recruits the five of them so they can become the new pilots of GoLion and help her start fighting back against the Empire.

== Characters ==
=== The GoLion team ===
- Akira Kogane (黄金 旭, Kogane Akira) / Voiced by: Kazuhiko Inoue

Nickname: Chief (チーフ, Chīfu) An even-tempered young man and a natural leader, Akira leads the GoLion team in the Black Lion and wears a red uniform. A strategic thinker, he can quickly assess whatever difficult situation the GoLion team is in, and take decisive and often correct action. He is known to be quite rough on his team at times in accomplishing their goals, but he is ultimately a fair leader who cares deeply for his comrades. Kogane counts on all of them to be up to the challenge of opposing Galra, as Golion's allies are likewise counting on them. "Kogane" is based on the Japanese word for gold.

- Takashi Shirogane (銀 貴, Shirogane Takashi) / Voiced by: Ryūsei Nakao (Episode 1–6)

Nickname: Quiet (黙り, Danmari) Takashi was the original second-in-command. He piloted the Blue Lion and wore a black uniform. He is approximately the same age as Akira. In episode 6, he was wounded during an attack by Honerva and later died from his injuries. He was given a hero's burial. Princess Farla replaced him as the Blue Lion's pilot. He had a younger brother named Ryou, who, along with Princess Amue, joined the heroes in the fight against the Galra Empire. Ryou also perished in battle. "Shirogane" is based on the Japanese word for silver.

- Isamu Kurogane (黒鋼 勇, Kurogane Isamu) / Voiced by: Yū Mizushima

Nickname: Moody (お天気屋, Otenkiya) Second-in-command of GoLion, Isamu pilots the Red Lion and wears a blue uniform. He is tall, wiry, and wily, and is approximately 21-23 years of age. Isamu is always joking and teasing others whenever he gets the chance. He is the only one in the group who contests any of Akira's commands. He is also a ladies' man and a great pilot, though a bit too daring at times. "Kurogane" is based on the Japanese word for iron or steel.

- Tsuyoshi Seidō (青銅 強, Seidō Tsuyoshi) / Voiced by: Tessho Genda

Nickname: Hothead (向こうっ気, Mukōkki) Tsuyoshi is the quick-tempered strongman of the group. He pilots the Yellow Lion and wears an orange uniform. He is roughly 22-24 years old. He may look tough and mean, but he has a soft heart, especially when it comes to children. He is never late for a meal. Though his friends tease him about his appetite, Tsuyoshi is very muscular. "Seidō" is based on the Japanese word for bronze.

- Hiroshi Suzuishi (錫石 宏, Suzuishi Hiroshi) / Voiced by: Masako Nozawa

Nickname: Shorty (チビ, Chibi) Hiroshi is the youngest and smallest of the group. He pilots the Green Lion and wears a green uniform. He is approximately 12 years old. Hiroshi graduated from the academy at a young age, and his specialty is science. Like the others, he is well-trained in martial arts, and uses his size and agility to his advantage, owing to his ninja lineage. Hiroshi is not afraid to speak his mind, especially to the villains. "Suzuishi" is based on the Japanese word for tin.

- Princess Farla (ファーラ姫, Fāra Hime) / Voiced by: Rumiko Ukai

Farla is the ruler of the Kingdom of Altea, and is 16 years old. She was raised by Raible after her parents, older brothers and older sister were executed by Daibazaal when she was a year old, and has sworn revenge against him for ravaging her planet. After the death of Shirogane, Farla takes it upon herself to pilot the Blue Lion, much to the surprise of everyone. As Blue Lion's pilot, she wears a pink uniform. The spirit of her father will sometimes appear, and provide guidance. At 16 years of age, she is strong-willed and a bit naïve, resisting attempts by Raible and Hys to make her behave in a more royal fashion. Farla is also relatively inexperienced as a pilot, which occasionally puts both herself and GoLion in danger. She is also lustfully pursued by Imperial Prince Sincline (whom she detests), due to her resemblance to his dead mother, Emperor Daibazaal's concubine. Her sole living relative is her aunt, Queen Elena. She is friends with a family of mice (Platt and Chuchule) who have kept her company since she was a little girl.

=== Other allies ===
- Strategist Raible (軍師ライブル, Gunshi Raiburu) / Voiced by: Yūji Fujishiro

Raible is Farla's royal adviser and is in charge of the Castle Control. He spirited away the baby Farla from the clutches of Daibazaal 15 years earlier, and raised her like his own daughter. He also advises the GoLion team, and can be very over-protective of Farla and opinionated at times.

- Senior Court Lady Hys (女官長ヒス, Jokanchō Hisu) / Voiced by: Kazuyo Aoki

Hys is Farla's over-protective caregiver, who always wants to make all of Farla's decisions for her. Like Raible, Hys fusses over the Princess, and is bent on keeping her away from all harm. She often comes into conflict with the four men on the Golion team, out of concern they are causing a negative influence on Farla. Suzuishi sometimes derogatorily calls her "Hys-teria." She dies near the finale when protecting Raible from a laser blast.

- King Raimon (ライモン王, Raimon Ō) / Voiced by: Mahito Tsujimura

King Raimon is Farla's deceased father and previous ruler of Planet Altea. Fifteen years earlier, Raimon went forth to battle against Emperor Daibazaal and his Galra forces. He was caught and executed with his wife and elder children, leaving Farla as his only surviving descendant. His body and the keys to the Lions were placed in a royal tomb located right underneath the castle. He returns to the world of the living every so often as a ghost to give advice to Farla to help her in her struggle against the Galra Empire.

- Space Mice (宇宙鼠, Uchū Nezumi) (voice actors unknown)

A family of five mice that live in Gradam Castle. They were Princess Farla's only friends while she was growing up, and she is the only one who can understand their language. The father mouse's name is Platt (プラット, Puratto) and the mother mouse is Chuchule (チュチュール, Chuchūru). Their nemesis is Jaga, the cat of the witch Honerva.

- Ryou Shirogane (銀亮, Shirogane Ryō) / Voiced by: Ryūsei Nakao

Takashi's younger brother, a former prisoner on Planet Galra who escapes and later rescues Princess Amue. He bears a strong resemblance to his older brother, though he has longer sideburns. Ryou learns from Amue that Takashi is dead, and vows to avenge his death. In the final episode he kills Sincline at the cost of his own life.

- Princess Amue (アミュー姫, Amyū Hime) (voice actor unknown)

Princess Amue is Farla's cousin. She lives on Planet Heracles, where she co-rules with her younger brother, Prince Alor. Her father, King Heracles, once had an alliance with Emperor Daibazaal. Her older brother, Prince Samson, was transformed into a Beast Fighter, which caused his death at the hands of Galra for refusing to fight further. She is a dead-ringer for Princess Farla in terms of physical appearance. Though once a slave of Sincline, Takashi's brother Ryou came to her rescue when she was about to be executed, together they fight for her people against the Galra Empire. Amue appears to have romantic feelings for Ryou.

- Prince Alor (アロン王子, Aron Ōji) / Voiced by: Mari Shimizu

Princess Amue's younger brother. He used to admire Sincline's skill as a fighter, but after witnessing the deaths of both his father and older brother by Galra forces, followed by the abduction of his sister by Sincline, the young prince is left devastated. With the encouragement of the Golion team, he joins forces with them and Altea in their fight with Galra, and to rescue Amue from Sincline's clutches.

- The Goddess of the Universe Voiced by: Haruko Kitahama

She is one that split the GoLion into five robotic lions to teach the GoLion humility. So many years later, after GoLion has proven his worth and learning humility, the Goddess of the Universe restores GoLion's lost power and makes him stronger than ever.

=== The Galra Empire ===
The Galra Empire (ガルラ大帝国, Garura dai Teikoku) are a race of merciless individuals who even oppress their own people. They capture other planets and enslave their population, forcing them to serve its evil ruler, Emperor Daibazaal. Daibazaal's son, Prince Sincline, conquered other worlds and beheaded their leaders as trophies. The Galra Empire invades planets with the aid of Galran Beast Fighters.

- Emperor Daibazaal (ダイ・バザール大帝王, Dai Bazāru Daiteiō) / Voiced by: Kosei Tomita (Episode 1-51)

The Emperor of Galra and a sadistic, tyrannical, supreme ruler who is the illegitimate child of the previous emperor and Honerva. He uses his subjects and even his own son, Sincline, as his scapegoats whenever he fails. He hates all that is good and wants to conquer the universe. He has enslaved countless civilizations, claiming them for the glory of himself. He loses his temper easily, and even killed one of his allies the ruler of Jarre when his birthday celebration was ruined by GoLion. Later, he sentences Sincline to imprisonment as part of the Galran law against repeated failures. Daibazal's slaves are usually humans, but at one point he raped a blonde Altean woman to produce his son, Sincline. When he failed in his mission after imprisoning his own son for failure, Sincline turned the tables and forced him to pilot Mecha Beast Fighter Galra made in his own image. Although he was able to pin down GoLion and almost destroy him with a battle axe, a miracle occurred. GoLion's sword emitted a sudden energy boost, and his repaired Laser Sword managed to backfire at the Beastman, weakening him severely. GoLion destroyed the robot with Daibazaal inside, killing him.

- Prince Sincline (シンクライン皇太子, Shinkurain Kōtaishi) / Voiced by: Akira Kamiya (Episode 14–52)

Crown prince of Galra and a half-Altean. A dangerous, cunning, and occasionally unstable adversary, Sincline's brutality rivals even his father's, his only weakness is the fact that he fell in love with Princess Farla, who somewhat resembles his mother whom his father, Emperor Daibazaal, killed after begging a favor to pardon the other prisoners but was refused. He plots to overthrow his own father and marry Princess Farla. He is a sly, scheming villain with a sense of honor, preferring to fight fair over his father's dirty tactics, and is Akira's frequent rival. Like his father, Sincline loses his temper easily and kills his own men with very little provocation. He even killed his own slave woman once when she accidentally spilled some liquid Sincline was drinking on his leg. Towards the end, Sincline and his followers depose Daibazaal, and Sincline declares himself emperor. Unfortunately for him, the tide has since turned against Galra, and Golion and his allies have brought the fight to the planet Galra itself. Sincline finds himself completely surrounded in his castle by the Golion force. Realizing the game is up, Sincline's remaining followers plead with him to surrender for the sake of Galra, to which he responds by summarily executing them. The Golion team plus Ryou enter the castle to capture Sincline, but he managed to escape to the top of the castle, taking Ryou with him as a hostage. On the top spire of Castle Galra, Sincline prepares to melt down GoLion with a beam cannon, while holding Ryou at sword-point. The space mice attack Sincline with their robot, distracting him long enough for Ryou to stab him in the chest with a dagger, and they both fall off the spire to their deaths.

- Honerva (妖婆ホネルバ, Yōba Honeruba) / Voiced by: Masako Nozawa (Episode 1-51)

A scientist/witch who uses certain magic spells, like hypnotism, and disguises. She also creates the legendary Beast Fighters, which are the apex of Galran technology and sends them against GoLion. She is hinted to be secretly the previous emperor's mistress and despises Sincline's Altean blood. When Emperor Daibazaal piloted the last Beast Fighter, she wanted to grant the Emperor victory. She is killed by Prince Sincline's sword at the end of the series after the destruction of Galra Castle when she betrays him by helping GoLion instead and revealing the truth that Daibazaal was her illegitimate son by the previous emperor (thus making her Sincline's grandmother though he felt no attachment to her), and that Sincline's mother was an Altean woman.

- Jaga (ヤガ, Yaga) (Episode 1-51)

Honerva's pet Space Cat, with whom Honerva is able to communicate (similar to how Farla can communicate with the Space Mice). He is the arch-enemy of the Space Mice. Sincline killed him by slashing him before killing Honerva.

- Sadak (サダック, Sadakku) / Voiced by: Kenichi Ogata (Episode 1–14)

Military commander of Planet Galra. He heads the invasion force as the Emperor's best general. However, his constant failures against GoLion for so long caused him to be sentenced to death by the Emperor. Before sentence could be carried out, though, Prince Sincline gave him a chance to become a gigantic Beast Fighter and fight GoLion to redeem himself. When this happened, he was killed by GoLion in their final battle, allowing Sincline to step in as commander of the Galran military against Planet Altea.

- Gobra (ゴブラ, Gobura) / Voiced by: Minoru Inaba (Episode 17–52)

A soldier assigned to Prince Sincline. Killed by Sincline in the last episode.

- Blackman Soldiers

Galran foot soldiers that perform sadistic operations like starving, whipping, and killing slaves.

- Reggar (Episode 37)

He was trying to get the position of Supreme Commander of the Galra Air Force. However, he was killed in battle against GoLion while piloting a seemingly undefeatable Beast Fighter, when he presumably committed suicide.

== Golion ==
Golion was separated into five separate lion robots by a space goddess who wished to teach Golion humility until he could be reassembled. Golion later gains a soul after being reawakened by the five pilots who use Golion to protect the universe from Emperor Daibazaal's forces. Golion is 60 meters (200 ft) tall, and weighs 772 tons. Individually, the lions weigh 154.4 tons.

- Black Lion (黒獅子, Kurojishi)

Forms the torso and head of GoLion. Powered by lightning. Piloted by Akira.

- Red Lion (赤獅子, Akajishi)

Forms the right arm of GoLion. Powered by fire. Piloted by Isamu.

- Green Lion (緑獅子, Midorijishi)

Forms the left arm of GoLion. Powered by wind. Piloted by Hiroshi.

- Blue Lion (青獅子, Aojishi)

Forms the right leg of GoLion. Powered by water. Piloted by Takashi, and later Farla after Takashi's death.

- Yellow Lion (黄獅子, Kijishi)

Forms the left leg of GoLion. Powered by earth. Piloted by Tsuyoshi.

Each Lion has a Lion Blade (a boomerang held in the lion's mouth), dorsal missiles, and shoulder-mounted lasers. When united, Golion's main weapon is Ten Kings Sword (十王剣, Jūōken), which is usually used to deliver the final blow to his opponents. Later in the series, it is used to perform the techniques Lightning Drop (稲妻落とし, Inazuma Otoshi) and Meteor Five Step Slash (流星五段斬り, Ryūsei Godan Giri). The name is a pun: Jūō written with the kanji 獣王 means Beast King. In Media Blasters' release of GoLion, it is translated as "King's Sword Jyuoken" (when summoning the weapon, otherwise it is simply "Jyuoken").

== Beastmen ==
=== Galran Deathblack Beastmen ===
Galran Deathblack Beastmen (デスブラック獣人, Desuburakku Jūjin) were previously Beast Fighters, serving as the apex of Galran technology and dark magic, and are sent by Honerva against Golion. Anyone captured and enslaved by the Galran Empire are immediately herded into the arena on Planet Galra where they are forced to fight to the death against the larger, powerful, and deadlier Beastmen who can easily kill them before an enthusiastic crowd. Then the slaves are butchered and made into slave stew, a favorite gruesome dish for the Beastmen to eat and also fed to surviving slaves as a form of forced cannibalism to turn them to be as savage as the Beastmen. Anyone who survives fighting the Deathblack Beastmen are subjected to Honerva's dark magic that changes them into Beastmen to fight Golion.

=== Galran Mechablack Beastmen ===
Galran Mechablack Beastmen (メカブラック獣人, Mekaburakku Jūjin) are the successors of the Deathblack Beastmen and first appear in episode 31; most of their names are taken after letters of the Greek Alphabet. Unlike deathblacks, mechablacks are constructed at planet Galra's occult science plant instead of the coliseum and use beastmen as their brain component.

Notably, Emperor Daibazaal unwillingly becomes part of a mechablack beastman in the series' final episodes.

== Changes for Voltron ==
GoLion footage was heavily edited and re-assembled by World Events Productions in the U.S. to create Voltron. Changes made to the series included rewritten dialogue, omitted character deaths, toned-down violence, and altered plot developments. In addition, Toei Animation Ltd. created and animated a brand new plot arc specifically for the U.S. Voltron series. Toei sold all of its rights to GoLion to World Events Productions, as GoLion had achieved only average ratings in Japan, in comparison to the popularity of Voltron in the U.S., and the series has yet to receive a DVD release in Japan.

== Episodes ==
No.	Title	Directed by	Written by	Original release date
1	"Escape from Slave Castle" "Dorei-jō kara no Dasshutsu" (Japanese: 奴隷城からの脱出)	Directed by : Hiroyuki Kamii; Storyboarded by : Katsuhiko Taguchi; Johei Matsura	Susumu Takaku	March 4, 1981
2	"The Ruined Phantom Planet" "Shimetsu Shita Maboroshi no Hoshi" (Japanese: 死滅した幻の星)	Directed by : Shohei Ishida; Storyboarded by : Masamune Ochiai	Susumu Takaku	March 11, 1981
3	"A Ghost and the Five Keys" "Bōrei to Itsutsu no Kagi" (Japanese: 亡霊と五つの鍵)	Directed by : Hideo Watanabe; Storyboarded by : Kazuyuki Okasako	Susumu Takaku	March 18, 1981
4	"Resurrection of the Legendary Giant" "Densetsu Kyojin no Fukkatsu" (Japanese: 伝説巨人の復活)	Directed by : Katsuhito Akiyama; Storyboarded by : Toshihiko Nishikubo	Susumu Takaku	March 25, 1981
5	"Fortress for the New Struggle" "Atarashiki Tatakai no Toride" (Japanese: 新しき戦いの砦)	Directed by : Hideo Watanabe; Storyboarded by : Katsuhiko Taguchi	Hirohisa Soda	April 1, 1981
6	"Death of Shirogane the Hero" "Yūsha Gin Shirogane no Shi" (Japanese: 勇者銀銀(しろがね)の死)	Directed by : Makoto Nagao; Storyboarded by : Masamune Ochiai	Susumu Takaku	April 8, 1981
7	"The Beautiful Princess' Battle" "Utsukushiki Hime no Tatakai" (Japanese: 美しき姫の戦い)	Hiroyuki Kamii	Akira Nakahara	April 15, 1981
8	"Stolen Blue Lion" "Nusuma reta Ao Shishi" (Japanese: 盗まれた青獅子(ブルーライオン))	Directed by : Katsuhito Akiyama; Storyboarded by : Kazuyuki Okasako	Masaki Sakurai	April 22, 1981
9	"Girl of the Land of Evil" "Akuma no Kuni no Shōjo" (Japanese: 悪魔の国の少女)	Directed by : Hideo Watanabe; Storyboarded by : Kenzo Koizumi	Susumu Takaku	April 29, 1981
10	"Secret of the White Lion" "Shiro Raion no Himitsu" (Japanese: 白ライオンの秘密)	Directed by : Hiroyuki Kamii; Storyboarded by : Masamune Ochiai	Masaki Sakurai	May 6, 1981
11	"The Red Rain of Hell" "Jigoku no Akai Ame" (Japanese: 地獄の赤い雨)	Directed by : Hideo Watanabe; Storyboarded by : Hideyoshi Oga	Masaki Sakurai	May 13, 1981
12	"Evildoing of the Emperor" "Dai Teiō no Akugō" (Japanese: 大帝王の悪業)	Directed by : Hideyoshi Oga; Storyboarded by : Hiroyuki Kamii	Akira Nakahara	May 20, 1981
13	"Introducing Beautiful Honerva" "Bijo Honeruba Shutsugen" (Japanese: 美女ホネルバ出現)	Directed by : Katsuhito Akiyama; Storyboarded by : Kazuyuki Okasako	Susumu Takaku	May 27, 1981
14	"The Crown Prince of Hell" "Jigoku no Kōtaishi" (Japanese: 地獄の皇太子)	Directed by : Kazushi Nomura; Storyboarded by : Hiroshi Sasagawa	Susumu Takaku	June 3, 1981
15	"Overcome the Phantom of Shirogane" "Shirogane no Maboroshi o Norikoero" (Japanese: 銀(しろがね)の幻を乗越えろ)	Directed by : Hiroyuki Kamii; Storyboarded by : Tadashi Ai	Akiyoshi Sakai	June 10, 1981
16	"The Legendary Bridge of Love" "Densetsu no Ai no Hashi" (Japanese: 伝説の愛の橋)	Directed by : Kazushi Nomura; Storyboarded by : Hiromichi Matano	Masaki Sakurai	June 17, 1981
17	"Challenge from Space" "Uchū no Chōsen-jō" (Japanese: 宇宙の挑戦状)	Directed by : Kazushi Nomura; Storyboarded by : Satoshi Suyama	Satoshi Suyama	June 24, 1981
18	"Footsteps in the Forest of Fear" "Kyōfu no Mori no Ashioto" (Japanese: 恐怖の森の足音)	Kazuya Miyazaki	Masaki Sakurai	July 1, 1981
19	"The Mystery of Ghost Castle" "Nazo no Yūrei-jō" (Japanese: 謎の幽霊城)	Directed by : Tatsuya Kasahara; Storyboarded by : Tadashi Ai	Masaki Sakurai	July 8, 1981
20	"Goodbye, Earth" "Sayōnara Chikyū" (Japanese: さようなら地球)	Directed by : Kazushi Nomura; Storyboarded by : Hiroshi Sasagawa	Masaki Sakurai	July 15, 1981
21	"Altea's Sister Planet" "Arutea no Kyōdai Hoshi" (Japanese: アルテアの姉弟(きょうだい)星)	Katsuhito Akiyama	Satoshi Suyama	July 22, 1981
22	"Phantom Space Flowers" "Maboroshi no Uchū Hana" (Japanese: 幻の宇宙花)	Directed by : Kazushi Nomura; Storyboarded by : Hiroshi Sasagawa	Satoshi Suyama	July 29, 1981
23	"Friday the 13th" "Jū San-nichi no Kin'yōbi" (Japanese: 十三日の金曜日)	Hiroyuki Kamii	Masaki Sakurai	August 5, 1981
24	"Look for the Little Shadows" "Chīsana Kage o Sagase" (Japanese: 小さな影を探せ)	Kazushi Nomura	Masaki Sakurai	August 12, 1981
25	"Destroy the Giant Cannon!" "Kyodai-hō o Hakai Seyo" (Japanese: 巨大砲を破壊せよ)	Directed by : Kazuya Miyazaki; Storyboarded by : Hideyoshi Oga	Akiyoshi Sakai	August 19, 1981
26	"Defeat the Invisible Enemy" "Mienai Teki o Taose" (Japanese: 見えない敵を倒せ)	Hiromichi Matano	Hiroshi Toda	August 26, 1981
27	"Giant Beastman's Lullaby" "Kyodai Kemonohito no Komori Uta" (Japanese: 巨大獣人の子守歌)	Directed by : Tatsuya Kasahara; Storyboarded by : Tadashi Ai	Kumiko Hayashi; Masaki Tsuji	September 2, 1981
28	"The Demon's Birthday" "Akuma no Tanjōbi" (Japanese: 悪魔の誕生日)	Directed by : Keiji Namisato; Storyboarded by : Hideyoshi Oga	Satoshi Suyama	September 9, 1981
29	"Comes a Fiery Sky" "Hi no Sora ga Semaru" (Japanese: 火の空が迫る)	Kazuya Miyazaki	Hiroshi Toda	September 16, 1981
30	"The Prince Imperial's Dark Love" "Kōitaishi no Kuroi Koi" (Japanese: 皇太子の黒い恋)	Directed by : Keiji Namisato; Storyboarded by : Katsuhiko Taguchi	Akira Nakahara	September 23, 1981
31	"The Dreaded Mecha Beastman" "Kyōfu no Meka Kemonohito" (Japanese: 恐怖のメカ獣人)	Directed by : Johei Matsura; Storyboarded by : Katsuhiko Taguchi	Masaki Sakurai	September 30, 1981
32	"Behold! The 100-ton Punch" "Miyo Hyaku-tan Panchi" (Japanese: 見よ百トンパンチ)	Directed by : Tatsuya Kasahara; Storyboarded by : Katsuhiko Taguchi	Satoshi Suyama	October 7, 1981
33	"Terror of the Space Frogs" "Uchū-Gaeru no Kyōfu" (Japanese: 宇宙ガエルの恐怖)	Directed by : Kazuya Miyazaki; Storyboarded by : Katsuhiko Taguchi	Hiroshi Toda	October 14, 1981
34	"Underground Operation" "Chika Senkō Sakusen" (Japanese: 地下潜行作戦)	Directed by : Keiji Namisato; Storyboarded by : Katsuhiko Taguchi	Susumu Takaku	October 21, 1981
35	"Protect the Soccer Field" "Sakkā-ba o Mamore" (Japanese: サッカー場を守れ)	Hiromichi Matano	Masaki Sakurai	October 28, 1981
36	"Mortal Combat of Light and Shadow" "Hika to Kage no Shitō" (Japanese: 光と影の死闘)	Directed by : Norihisa Kosaka; Storyboarded by : Hideyoshi Oga	Masaki Tsuji	November 4, 1981
37	"Space Speed Demon" "Uchū no Supīdo Kyō" (Japanese: 宇宙のスピード狂)	Directed by : Keiji Namisato; Storyboarded by : Kazuo Nakamura	Hiroshi Toda	November 11, 1981
38	"GoLion Hunting" "GoRaion Kari" (Japanese: ゴライオン狩り)	Kazuya Miyazaki	Kosuke Yoshida	November 18, 1981
39	"The Hypergravity Planetoid Trap" "Chō Jūryoku Hoshi no Wana" (Japanese: 超重力星のわな)	Directed by : Tatsuya Kasahara; Storyboarded by : Kazuo Nakamura	Satoshi Suyama	November 25, 1981
40	"No Tomorrow for Altea" "Ashita Naki Arutea" (Japanese: 明日なきアルテア)	Directed by : Norihisa Kosaka; Storyboarded by : Hideyoshi Oga	Satoshi Suyama	December 2, 1981
41	"Brave Shirogane's Brother" "Yūsha Shirogane no Otōto" (Japanese: 勇者銀(しろがね)の弟)	Directed by : Keiji Namisato; Storyboarded by : Katsuhiko Taguchi	Kosuke Yoshida	December 9, 1981
42	"The Sand Planet of Death" "Shi o Yobu Suna Wakusei" (Japanese: 死を呼ぶ砂惑星)	Directed by : Shunichi Ishida; Storyboarded by : Hideyoshi Oga	Kinuyo Nozaki	December 16, 1981
43	"Angry Youth Suicide Corp" "Ikari no Shōnen Kesshi-tai" (Japanese: 怒りの少年決死隊)	Directed by : Keiji Namisato; Storyboarded by : Hiromichi Matano	Hiroshi Toda	December 23, 1981
44	"The Planet Jarre Oath" "Jāru-boshi no Chikai" (Japanese: ジャール星の誓い)	Tatsuya Kasahara	Sumiko Watanabe	December 30, 1981
45	"The Great Army of Darkness" "Ankoku no Dai Gundan" (Japanese: 暗黒の大軍団)	Directed by : Hideyoshi Oga; Storyboarded by : Kazuya Miyazaki	Kosuke Yoshida	January 6, 1982
46	"Fight Back, Space Mice" "Uchū Shū Ganbare" (Japanese: 宇宙鼡ガンバレ)	Keiji Namisato	Akira Nakahara	January 13, 1982
47	"The Seven Free Planets" "Nanatsu no Jiyūna Hoshi" (Japanese: 七つの自由な星)	Directed by : Kazuya Miyazaki; Storyboarded by : Hideyoshi Oga	Norio Kozuka; Keiji Kubota	January 20, 1982
48	"Reunion with the Phantom" "Maboroshi to no Saikai" (Japanese: 幻との再会)	Hiromichi Matano	Masaki Sakurai	January 27, 1982
49	"The Last of Hys" "Hisu no Saigo" (Japanese: ヒスの最後)	Kazuya Miyazaki	Keiji Kubota	February 3, 1982
50	"The Great Storming of Galra" "Garura e Dai Shingeki" (Japanese: ガルラへ大進撃)	Directed by : Tatsuya Kasahara; Storyboarded by : Katsuhito Akiyama	Hisashi Yamazaki (Note: Penname of series director Katsuhiko Taguchi)	February 10, 1982
51	"GoLion's Desperate Battle" "GoRaion Dai Kusen" (Japanese: ゴライオン大苦戦)	Directed by : Johei Matsura; Storyboarded by : Hideyoshi Oga	Jiro Yoshino (Note: Penname of Takashi Iijima)	February 17, 1982
52	"Burn Galra Castle" "Moero Garura-jō" (Japanese: 燃えろガルラ城)	Directed by : Keiji Namisato; Storyboarded by : Katsuhiko Taguchi	Jiro Yoshino	February 24, 1982

== Releases ==
Media Blasters released GoLion on DVD in the U.S. in 3 volumes:

- Collection 1 was released on May 27, 2008.
- Collection 2 was released on August 12, 2008.
- Collection 3 was released on November 25, 2008.

GoLion episodes have at times been made available for viewing on World Events Productions' YouTube channel.

== Staff ==
- Original Creator: "Saburo Hatte" (pseudonym for Toei staff)
- General Director: Katsuhiko Taguchi
- Series Composition: Susumu Takaku
- Episode Direction: Kazuyuki Okaseko, Hiroshi Sasagawa, Kazuya Miyazaki, Johei Matsuura, Tatsuya Kasahara
- Character Designs: Kazuo Nakamura
- Mechanical Designs: Katsushi Murakami, Takayuki Masuo, Yoshiro Harada, Submarine
- Animation Direction: Kazuo Nakamura, Moriyasu Taniguchi, Akira Shinoda, Akira Saijo, Hiroshi Iino, Hiromitsu Ohta
- Music: Masahisa Takeichi
- Opening Theme: "Tatakae! GoLion" (Fight, GoLion!)
- Ending Theme: "Gonin de Hitotsu" (One Of Every Five People) performed by Ichiro Mizuki & Koorogi '73 (Nippon Columbia)
