= Harper House =

Harper House may refer to:

== Locations ==
=== United States ===
- Robert Atlas Harper House, Greenwood, Arkansas, listed on the National Register of Historic Places (NRHP) in Sebastian County
- Roy Harper House, Romance, Arkansas, listed on the NRHP in White County
- Harper House (Montverde, Florida), NRHP-listed
- Bailey-Harper House-Doctors Building, Gainesville, Georgia, listed on the NRHP in Hall County
- Carroll-Harper House, Cave Spring, Georgia, listed on the NRHP in Floyd County
- Roe-Harper House, Milledgeville, Georgia, listed on the NRHP in Baldwin County, Georgia
- John B. Harper House, Palestine, Illinois, NRHP-listed
- Harper House (Rock Island, Illinois), 19th century hotel (demolished) in Rock Island, Illinois
- Harper Family House, Limerick, Maine, listed on the NRHP in York County
- Phoenix Hall-Johnson-Harper House, Raymond, Mississippi, listed on the NRHP in Hinds County
- Harper House (Archdale, North Carolina), listed on the NRHP in Randolph County
- Harper House (Harper, North Carolina), listed on the NRHP in Johnston County
- Rice Harper House, Sandusky, Ohio, listed on the NRHP in Sandusky, Ohio
- Samuel Harper Stone House, New Concord, Ohio, NRHP-listed
- William Rainey Harper Log House, New Concord, Ohio, NRHP-listed
- Frances Ellen Watkins Harper House, Philadelphia, Pennsylvania, a National Historic Landmark
- Harper-Chesser House, Georgetown, Texas, listed on the NRHP in Williamson County
- Alfred William Harper House, Lindon, Utah, listed on the NRHP in Utah County
- Harper House (Stuarts Draft, Virginia), listed on the NRHP in Augusta County
- F. C. Harper House, Port Townsend, Washington, listed on the NRHP in Jefferson County

== Other ==
- The Harper House, a 2021 animated television series
