= Bill Nye Saves the World =

American television show

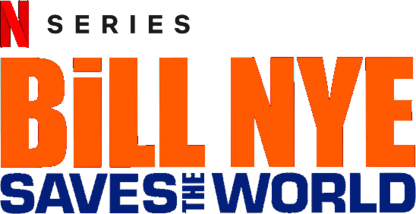
- Genre: Talk show
- Created by: Bill Nye
- Directed by: Nick Murray; Liz Plonka
- Presented by: Bill Nye
- Starring: Karlie Kloss; Derek Muller; Nazeem Hussain; Emily Calandrelli; Joanna Hausmann
- Theme music composer: Tyler, the Creator
- Country of origin: United States
- Original language: English
- No. of seasons: 3
- No. of episodes: 25

Production
- Executive producers: Gil Goldschein; Julie Pizzi; Michael Naidus; Bill Nye; Jason Spingarn-Koff; Terry Wood; Lisa Nishimura
- Producers: Dave Sambuchi; MC Spurlock
- Cinematography: Jake Kerber
- Running time: 25–41 minutes
- Production company: Bunim/Murray Productions

Original release
- Network: Netflix
- Release: April 21, 2017 – May 11, 2018

Bill Nye Saves the World is an American television show streaming on Netflix hosted and created by Bill Nye. It is both a sequel and a revival of sorts of Bill Nye the Science Guy, which is also created by Nye. The show's byline was, "Emmy-winning host Bill Nye brings experts and famous guests to his lab for a talk show exploring scientific issues that touch our lives", with the series' focus placed on science and its relationship with politics, pop culture, and society. Unlike Nye's previous show Bill Nye the Science Guy (which is revived in this show) which was intended for children, Bill Nye Saves the World is intended for adults (especially those adults who watched Bill Nye the Science Guy when they were children during its original run in the 1990s). As such, some episodes have Nye discuss topics that would be considered inappropriate to mention to minors.

Though the show was hosted by Nye, five correspondents assist in the presentation of the show. These include fashion model Karlie Kloss, science YouTuber and educator Derek Muller, comedian Nazeem Hussain, comedian and writer Joanna Hausmann, and the TV host and producer Emily Calandrelli. The show's theme song was produced by Tyler, the Creator. The thirteen-episode first season premiered on April 21, 2017. A six-episode second season premiered on December 29, 2017, and a six-episode third season was released on May 11, 2018. Reception to the series has been mixed, with the first season being reviewed more positively by critics than audiences.

== Release history ==
The thirteen-episode first season premiered on April 21, 2017. It explores topics such as climate change, alternative medicine, and video games from a scientific point of view, while also refuting myths and anti-scientific claims.

On June 15, 2017, Nye announced on his Facebook page that the series had been renewed for a six-episode second season, which premiered on December 29, 2017.

On April 9, 2018, Netflix announced the show had been renewed for a six-episode third season, released on May 11, 2018.

== Episodes ==
=== Series overview ===
Season	Episodes	Originally released
1	13	April 21, 2017
2	6	December 29, 2017
3	6	May 11, 2018

=== Season 1 (2017) ===
No. overall	No. in season	Title	Original release date	Prod. code
1	1	"Earth Is a Hot Mess"	April 21, 2017	101
Nominated for the 69th Primetime Emmy Awards; Bill discusses climate change.: Correspondent: Karlie Kloss; Guests: Zach Braff, Desiigner; Panelists: Mark Jacobson, Richard Martin, Taryn O'Neill
2	2	"Tune Your Quack-o-Meter"	April 21, 2017	102
Bill debunks alternative medicine.: Correspondent: Joanna Hausmann; Guests: Steve Aoki, Prashanth Venkat; Panelists: Chris Beedie, Cara Santa Maria, Donald Schultz
3	3	"Machines Take Over the World"	April 21, 2017	103
Bill discusses artificial intelligence.: Correspondent: Derek Muller; Guests: Neil deGrasse Tyson (voice), Saqib Shaik, Margaret Mitchell; Panelists: Ryan Calo, Xeni Jardin, Subbarao Kambhampati
4	4	"More Food, Less Hype"	April 21, 2017	104
Bill discusses genetically modified organisms.: Correspondent: Derek Muller; Panelists: Robb Fraley, Fred Gould, Julie Kennye
5	5	"The Original Martian Invasion"	April 21, 2017	105
Bill discusses the theory of panspermia.: Correspondent: Derek Muller; Guests: Alton Brown, Rachel Bloom, Randy Couture, Hunter Pence; Panelists: Moogega Cooper Stricker, Hakeem Oluseyi, Wil Wheaton
6	6	"Do Some Shots, Save the World"	April 21, 2017	106
Bill discusses vaccinations.: Correspondent: Emily Calandrelli; Guests: Diedrich Bader, Jim O'Heir, John O'Hurley, Prashanth Venkat, George Wendt; Panelists: Lanre Falusi, Kristen Omeara, Jennifer Reich
7	7	"Cheat Codes for Reality"	April 21, 2017	107
Bill discusses playing games.: Correspondents: Derek Muller, Nazeem Hussain; Guests: Gus Sorola, Geoff Ramsey; Panelists: Hilarie Cash, Shawn Green, Jonna Mae
8	8	"This Diet Is Bananas"	April 21, 2017	108
Bill discusses diets.: Correspondent: Karlie Kloss; Guests: Martin Starr, Aubrey Anderson-Emmons, Lauren Ash, Jeff Dye, Heather McDonald, Andi Osho; Panelists: Sara Benincasa, Traci Mann, Jennifer Widerstrom
9	9	"The Sexual Spectrum"	April 21, 2017	109
Nominated for the 69th Primetime Emmy Awards; Bill discusses sex.: Correspondent: Derek Muller; Guests: Rachel Bloom, Todd Barry, Sandra Bernhard, Matt Lucas, Mario Cantone, Margaret Cho, Cameron Esposito, Prashanth Venkat; Panelists: Solomon Georgio, Katrina Karkazis, Jeff McCune
10	10	"Saving the World—with Space!"	April 21, 2017	110
Bill discusses space exploration.: Correspondent: Emily Calandrelli; Guests: Joel McHale, Diamond Stone, Roman Duponte; Panelists: Chris Lewicki, Michelle Thaller, George T. Whitesides
11	11	"Malarkey!"	April 21, 2017	111
Bill debunks extrasensory perception.: Correspondent: Karlie Kloss; Guests: Donald Faison; Panelists: Jamila Bey, Timothy Caulfield, Sam Reynolds
12	12	"Designer Babies"	April 21, 2017	112
Bill discusses designer babies.: Correspondents: Karlie Kloss, Nazeem Hussain; Guests: Tim Gunn; Panelists: Camille Hammond, Leslie Hinkson, Paul Knoepfler
13	13	"Earth's People Problem"	April 21, 2017	113
Bill discusses human overpopulation.: Correspondents: Emily Calandrelli, Joanna Hausmann; Panelists: Nerys Benfield, Travis Rieder, Rachel Snow

=== Season 2 (2017) ===
No. overall	No. in season	Title	Original release date	Prod. code
14	1	"The Marijuana Episode"	December 29, 2017	201
Bill discusses marijuana.: Correspondent: Derek Muller; Panelists: Dr. Ziva Cooper, Kevin Smith and Rick Garza
15	2	"Your Computer Is Under Attack"	December 29, 2017	202
Bill discusses computer viruses, malware, and related cyber attacks.: Correspondent: Karlie Kloss; Panelists: Karlie Kloss, Golan Ben-Oni and Keren Elazari; Guests: Steve-O, Tim Meadows and Dr. Lars Dietrich
16	3	"We Suck at Sleeping"	December 29, 2017	203
Bill discusses sleep.: Correspondents: Emily Calandrelli, Joanna Hausmann; Panelists: Emily Calandrelli, Dr. Raj Dasgupta, Dr. Deidre Barrett; Guests: Byron Scott
17	4	"Sex, Drugs and Superbugs"	December 29, 2017	204
Bill discusses superbugs.: Correspondents: Bill Nye; Panelists: Dr. Jennifer Jay, Dr. Margaret Riley; Guests: Kurt Hugo Schneider, Ali Wong
18	5	"Extinction: Why All Our Friends Are Dying"	December 29, 2017	205
Bill discusses extinction and de-extinction.: Correspondents: Nazeem Hussain; Panelists: Nazeem Hussain, Dr. Hill Craddock, Dr. Beth Shapiro; Guests: Drew Carey, OK Go
19	6	"How to Travel Through Time"	December 29, 2017	206
Bill discusses time travel and gravity waves.: Correspondents: Derek Muller; Panelists: Brannon Braga, Carlton Cuse, Dr. Lisa Randall

=== Season 3 (2018) ===
No. overall	No. in season	Title	Original release date	Prod. code
20	1	"Cheating Death"	May 11, 2018	301
Bill discusses aging.: Correspondents: Derek Muller, Joanna Hausmann; Panelists: Joanna Hausmann, Aubrey de Grey, Megan Rosenbloom; Guests: Tyler, the Creator, Andrew Montgomery, Channah Rock; Skit cast: Ginger Gonzaga
21	2	"Surviving in a World Without Water"	May 11, 2018	302
Bill discusses water scarcity.: Correspondents: Derek Muller, Nazeem Hussain; Panelists: Derek Muller, Melanie Nakagawa, Marcus King; Guests: Martin Riese, Rianne Campbell; Skit cast: Julie Chang, Jillian Bell, Lauren Buckley
22	3	"The Addiction Episode"	May 11, 2018	303
Bill discusses addiction.: Correspondent: Cara Santa Maria; Panelists: Cara Santa Maria, Carl Hart, Bobby Chromik; Guests: Maria Bamford, Halley Froehlich; Skit cast: Michael Ian Black, Julie Chang, Judah Friedlander
23	4	"Recipes from the Future"	May 11, 2018	304
Bill discusses the future of food.: Correspondent: Karlie Kloss; Panelists: Aly Moore, Dominique Barnes, Uma Valeti; Guests: Margaret Cho, Natasha Agramonte; Skit cast: Danny Trejo, Michael Ian Black, Josh Robert Thompson (voice)
24	5	"Evolution: The Fact of Life"	May 11, 2018	305
Bill discusses evolution.: Correspondent: Derek Muller; Panelists: Derek Muller, Francisco J. Ayala, Jennifer Miller; Guests: Paul F. Tompkins, Andrew Katsis; Skit cast: Sanden Totten (voice), Michael Ian Black
25	6	"What is your pet really thinking?"	May 11, 2018	306
Bill discusses animal brains.: Correspondents: Cara Santa Maria, Joanna Hausmann; Panelists: Natalia Reagan, Barbara Natterson-Horowitz; Guests: Kid Ace, Dalton Ludwick; Skit cast: Arnold Schwarzenegger, Michael Ian Black

== Reception ==
Bill Nye Saves the World received mixed reviews from critics. The first season has an aggregate rating of 63 out of 100 based on 5 reviews from Metacritic and a Rotten Tomatoes score of 73% based on 11 reviews, with an average rating of 7/10. The performance segments of the show have been the focus of criticism. In particular, Rachel Bloom's performance in episode 9 has been described as "strange", "out of place", and a "painful couple of minutes". Conversely, NPR's Fresh Air said the show is "fun to watch," working well with Nye's "consistent reliance on scientific and provable facts." Vox praised Nye's unapologetic talking style, though worried this may alienate some viewers.
