= Jenny Lorenzo =

American actress

- Born: Miami, Florida, U.S.
- Occupations: Actress; YouTuber
- Years active: 2016–present

YouTube information
- Years active: 2014–present
- Subscribers: 216 thousand
- Views: 32 million
- Last updated: October 4, 2022
- Website: jennylorenzo.com

Jenny Lorenzo is an American YouTuber and actress. She is mostly known for her YouTube sketches inspired by her Cuban heritage, and was one of the co-founders of BuzzFeed's Pero Like.

== Career ==
=== 2016: Pero Like and We Are Mitú ===
In early 2016, Jenny Lorenzo was one of the co-founders for BuzzFeed's Pero Like (originally called BuzzFeed Sol). Lorenzo and Brittany Ashley appeared in small roles for "Gente-fied", a mini-webseries produced by America Ferrera (which later became a Netflix original series in 2020). BuzzFeed Motion Pictures terminated both staff members for violating their contract on July 10, 2016. Even though both Lorenzo and Ashley worked on the Netflix series in their free time, they were not authorized to work with other companies without prior permission.

Lorenzo's termination sparked conversations on the need for BuzzFeed staff to unionize. It also sparked the trend of "Why I Left BuzzFeed" videos, where people explain why they decided to quit their job at BuzzFeed. Safiya Nygaard, The Try Guys (left BuzzFeed in 2018), and Michelle Khare are known for this. After this event, Lorenzo started producing videos for We Are Mitú.

=== 2017–present: YouTube ===
Lorenzo quit producing videos with We Are Mitú. She started making videos for her YouTube channel that involves her Cuban heritage, such as her iconic "Abuela" character. Lorenzo started voice acting a recurring character named Lupe Gonzales, for Cartoon Network's Latin-American show: Victor and Valentino. She is one of the hosts of the weekly webseries, "What's Up, Disney+" with Andre Meadows. She also co-hosts a podcast called "Hyphenated" with Joanna Hausmann, where they discuss "Latin[o] identity in real life and in the media".

Lorenzo's voice acts as five recurring characters for Jellystone!. Lorenzo also voiced a character for Dan Povenmire's Hamster & Gretel, this is her first time voice acting a character for Disney.

== Filmography ==
=== Television ===
List of television credits, with selected details
Year	Title	Role	Notes	Ref.
2019–2022	Victor and Valentino	Lupe Gonzales	Recurring character	
2021–2025	Jellystone!	Choo-Choo	Recurring characters	
2021–2025	Jellystone!	Bobbie Louie	Recurring characters	
2021–2025	Jellystone!	Hardy Har Har	Recurring characters	
2021–2025	Jellystone!	Pixie	Recurring characters	
2021–2025	Jellystone!	Spooky (vocal effects)	Recurring characters	
2022–2025	Hamster & Gretel	Carmen "Abuelita" Gomez	Recurring character	
2023	The Loud House	Receptionist	Episode – "Road Trip: Bringing Down the House"	

=== Webseries ===
List of webseries credits, with selected details
Year	Title	Role	Notes	Ref.
2016	Gente-fied		Miniseries produced by America Ferrera	
2020–2022	What's Up, Disney+	Herself/Host	Weekly webseries	

=== Podcasts ===
List of podcast credits, with selected details
Year	Title	Role	Notes	Ref.
2021–present	Hyphenated	Herself/Host	Weekly podcast	

== See also ==
- List of people from Florida
