= Kid Ace =

American illusionist

- Born: David Boyd; December 3, 1989 (age 36); New York, New York, US
- Occupation: Magician/illusionist
- Years active: 2008–present
- Spouse: Laura Perez Boyd
- Website: kidace.com

David Boyd (born December 3, 1989) better known by his stage name Kid Ace, is an American magician/illusionist from Harlem, New York. He has become one of the world top touring illusionist completing over 150 shows per year and is the recipient of the Allan Houston FISSL award. Since then he has toured the world and has appeared on television multiple times. He combines multiple elements of hip-hop culture when performing, such as hip hop music and fashion.

Kid Ace is a featured guest on the Netflix series Bill Nye Saves the World season 3, which premiered on May 11, 2018.

== Television appearances ==
On February 18, 2019, Kid Ace appeared on the NBC daytime show Steve which gained over 1,200,000 views. During his appearance he made Steve Harvey run away in astonishment after making a glass pitcher explode in his hands with the help of the studio audience clapping loudly.

Kid Ace consulted and guest starred on episode 6 of Bill Nye Saves The World season 3. Alongside correspondent and YouTuber Joanna Hausmann, the team traveled to the Santa Barbara Zoo to study how animal brains react to magic and illusion.

== 2012–present ==
In 2012, Kid Ace headlined his one-man show titled "Underground Magic" at the Elecktra Theatre in Times Square.
