= Dave Scudamore =

American long-distance runner

David Scudamore (born 15 February 1970) was the 1997 US Marathon champion.

== Palos Verdes High School ==
He was the first All-state Cross Country runner from Palos Verdes High School in Palos Verdes, CA in 1987. Later, he finished in fifth place in the 3200 meters at the 1988 CIF California State Meet.

== Leland Stanford University ==
Dave is a 2 time All-Pac-10 Academic Honoree at Stanford University in 1990 and 1991. He was a 2 time NCAA All-American at 10,000m in 1992 and 1993.

== Professional running ==
Later he graduated and ran for the Nike Farm team in Palo Alto, CA. With a time of 2:13:48 Dave won the Pittsburgh Marathon in 1997, and in the 2000 United States Olympic Marathon Trials he finished 6th in a world class field. In the 1997 World championship Marathon held in Athens, Greece,, he finished 13th overall.

== Honors ==
After suffering an injury to his achilles in 1995, normally a career ending injury, he came back after surgery to win the National Marathon Championships two years later. His training of cycles between 120 miles a week and 105 miles a week, never exceeding 25 miles on a long run were considered conservative for a marathoner. He was named to the Rehab and Sports Medicine Hall of Fame in 2008.

== Personal life ==
His son Harrison finished 13 at the 2017 Foot Locker Cross Country Championships while a senior at Denver East High School. 30 years earlier, David finished 10th in the same race after finishing 15th the year before. He is married to American Sociologist Jennifer Reich

== Achievements ==
Year	Competition	Venue	Position	Notes
Representing the United States
1997	World Championships	Athens, Greece	13th	Marathon
