= Baba Looey =

American animated television character

- Quick Draw McGraw character
- First appearance: "Lamb Chopped"
- Created by: William Hanna; Joseph Barbera
- Voiced by: Daws Butler (1959–1988); Gilbert Mack/Don Elliot (Quick Draw McGraw and Huckleberry Hound LP (1959)); Chuck McCann (Wake Up, America! LP (1965)); Greg Berg (Hanna-Barbera's 50th: A Yabba Dabba Doo Celebration); Neil Ross (Fender Bender 500); Henry Polic II (Yo Yogi!); Earl Kress (Hanna-Barbera Cartoon Sound FX (1994)); Jeff Bergman (Cartoon Network and Boomerang bumpers, City E-Scape); Daren Tillinger (Web Premiere Toons); Joe Lala (Samurai Jack); Rob Paulsen (Harvey Birdman, Attorney at Law); Jenny Lorenzo (Jellystone!; as Bobbie Louie)

In-universe information
- Alias: The Whippersnapper
- Nicknames: Baba Boy; Baba Lewis; El Kapoli
- Species: Donkey
- Gender: Male
- Occupation: Deputy

Baba Looey is a fictional Mexican donkey that appeared in The Quick Draw McGraw Show. He is the deputy and familiar to Sheriff Quick Draw McGraw. He speaks English with a Mexican accent. He was originally voiced by Daws Butler.

== Character description ==
Baba Looey, McGraw's sidekick, is often portrayed as the more thoughtful half of the duo. At times realizing some detail about a given situation, Baba Looey tries desperately to caution Quick Draw of a trap or other danger, before Quick Draw charges headlong into the fray without listening or giving consideration to his surroundings. His masked vigilante identity is El Kapoli, "champion of champions" as he declared. In the episode "Dizzy Desperado", he gets knocked in the head and switches to the criminal Little Cucaracha.

== In popular culture ==
- Gary Dell'Abate, the executive producer of The Howard Stern Show, received his nickname "Baba Booey" from his mispronunciation of Baba Looey. On July 26, 1990, Dell'Abate mistakenly called Baba Looey "Baba Booey" during a discussion of original cartoon cels, saying that he was thinking about getting "Quick Draw McGraw and Baba Booey" cels next. Dell'Abate is now better known by "Baba Booey" than his own name.
- In the Daria episode "Lane Miserables", Trent asks the title character, "Why did Quick Draw McGraw hang around with that freaky little mule?"
- The name is a satirical portmanteau of "Babalú" which is a traditional Cuban song that Desi Arnaz made popular in the United States and uy which is a Spanish interjection.

== Other appearances ==
- In an episode of The Brady Bunch, Marcia can be seen watching Baba Looey and Quick Draw McGraw on TV.
- Baba Looey, along with Quick Draw McGraw, makes an appearance in the Samurai Jack episode "Couple on a Train", voiced by Joe Lala.
- He appears in the Harvey Birdman, Attorney at Law episode "Guitar Control", voiced by Rob Paulsen. He is seen hanging out with Peanut and shows him Quick Draw's guitars. Peanut wonders how it works and kills Baba Looey with it.
- Baba Looey made a brief cameo in a MetLife commercial in 2012.
- In the Drawn Together episode "Breakfast Food Killer", Baba Looey made an appearance going by the name "Baba Booey". He was waiting in line to become the new mascot of Quackers cereal and randomly started jumping around and attacking people.
- Baba Looey appears in the series Jellystone! and is female and Cuban in this version called "Bobbie Louie" due to the character being voiced by Jenny Lorenzo. She works for the Jellystone government and has an American accent.
- Baba Looey and Quick Draw McGraw make a cameo as silhouettes in the 2020 Animaniacs revival segment "Suffragette City".
