= Hamster & Gretel =

American animated superhero comedy television series

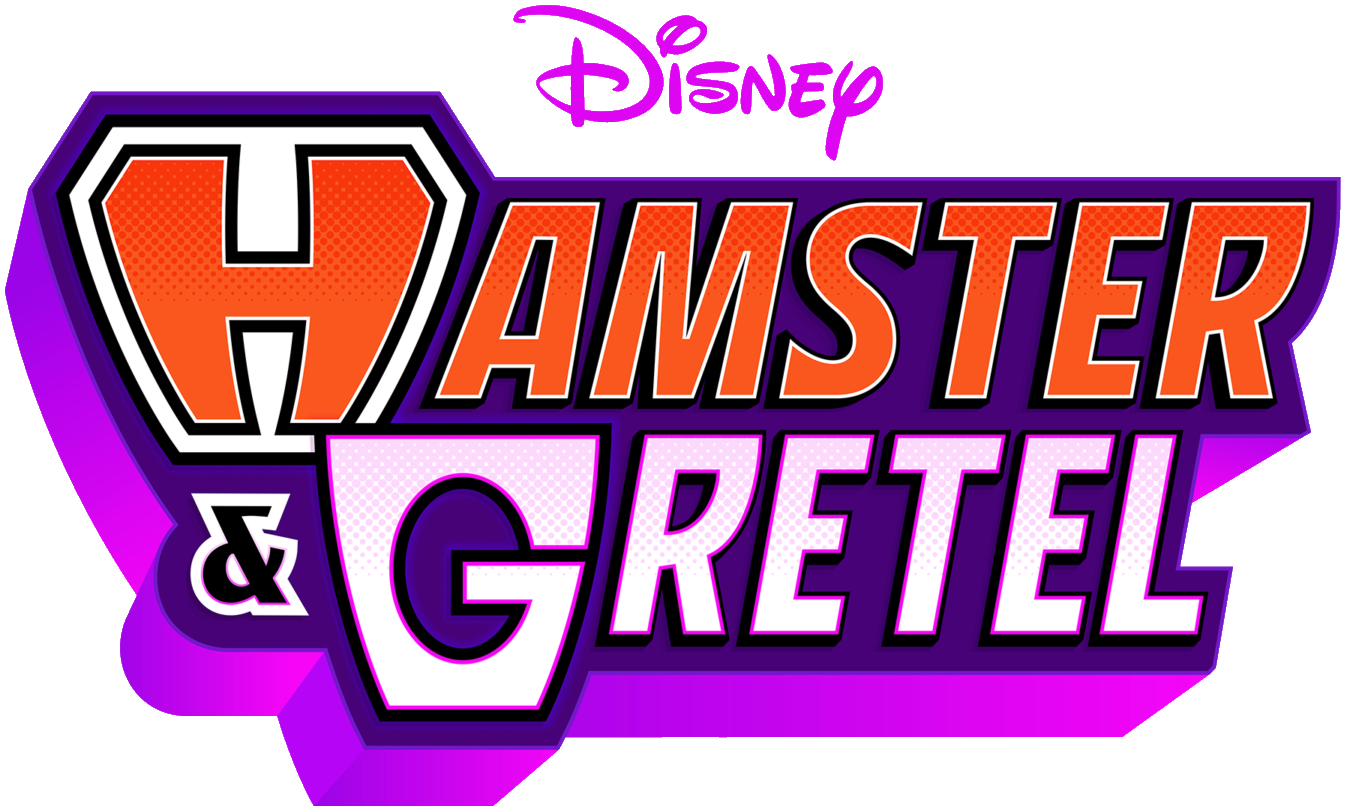
- Genre: Action; Adventure; Comedy; Musical; Superhero
- Created by: Dan Povenmire
- Voices of: Meli Povenmire; Michael Cimino; Beck Bennett; Joey King; Matt Jones; Carolina Ravassa
- Theme music composer: Dan Povenmire
- Opening theme: "Hamster & Gretel Theme Song"
- Composer: Danny Jacob
- Country of origin: United States
- Original language: English
- No. of seasons: 2
- No. of episodes: 50

Production
- Executive producers: Dan Povenmire; Joanna Hausmann (season 2); Bob Bowen (season 2)
- Producer: Brandi Young
- Running time: 22 minutes (two 11-minute segments)
- Production company: Disney Television Animation

Original release
- Network: Disney Channel (Note: Simulcast with Disney XD since season 2.)
- Release: August 12, 2022 – April 13, 2025

Related
- Phineas and Ferb; Milo Murphy's Law

Hamster & Gretel is an American animated superhero comedy television series created by Phineas and Ferb and Milo Murphy's Law co-creator Dan Povenmire that first aired on Disney Channel on August 12, 2022. In January 2023, the series was renewed for a second season that debuted on September 14, 2024.

== Plot ==
9-year-old Gretel and her pet hamster are given superpowers by aliens and become a superhero duo dedicated to protecting their city with the help of Gretel's older brother Kevin.

== Characters ==
=== Main ===
- Gretel Grant-Gomez (voiced by Meli Povenmire) is a 9-year-old girl and Kevin's excitable younger sister who gains superpowers and becomes a superheroine. While she means well, Gretel has a tendency to make problems worse by using brute force.
- Kevin Grant-Gomez (voiced by Michael Cimino) is a 16-year-old boy and Gretel's older brother who tries to support Hamster and Gretel in being superheroes. Despite lacking superpowers of his own, he is the brains of the group, due to his quick-thinking skills and ability to solve problems in dire moments.
- Hamster (voiced by Beck Bennett) is Gretel's stoic pet golden hamster who gets superpowers along with Gretel. He also gets the ability to speak, but generally does so in moments of comic relief.
- Winifred "Fred" Grant (voiced by Joey King) is Kevin and Gretel's deadpan, sarcastic, cynical and tech-savvy cousin (and Kevin's best friend) and Stacy's daughter and only child, who acts as the team's tech support. She also has gymnastic abilities, which were first shown in "Cheer Cheer Bang Bang".
- Dave Grant (voiced by Matt Jones) is Kevin and Gretel's father who works as a building manager at an apartment complex. He is physically modeled after series creator Dan Povenmire.
- Carolina Grant-Gomez (voiced by Carolina Ravassa) is Kevin and Gretel's eccentric, yet wise, Venezuelan-born mother who works as a nurse.

=== Recurring ===
- Churro (vocal effects provided by Dee Bradley Baker) is the Grant-Gomez family's dimwitted pet dog, whose mischief sometimes gets in the way of his owners.
- Carmen "Abuelita" Gomez (voiced by Jenny Lorenzo) is Carolina's strict mother and the maternal grandmother of Kevin and Gretel. She usually forces the kids to focus on chores whenever she babysits them and is one of the few family members to know Gretel's secret.
- Bailey Carter (voiced by Priah Ferguson) is Gretel's best friend who is also a major fan of the superhero Gretel. She was initially unaware that they were one and the same until "My Invisible Friend".
- Roman Carter (voiced by Michael-Leon Wooley) is Bailey's father who works as a video game producer.
- Michelle Carter (voiced by Debra Wilson) is Bailey's mother who works as a therapist.
- Nordle Ampersand (voiced by Pamela Adlon) is a nerdy and wealthy boy in Gretel's class who is the son of Professor Exclamation, but has no interest in villainy. He is friends with Gretel and Bailey and as of "Tobor or Not Tobor", has become aware of Gretel's superhero identity.
  - Tobor (voiced by Alex Estrada) is Nordle's semi-competent robot companion who waits on his hand and foot, but secretly wishes to earn his respect. His name spelled backwards is "robot".
- Veronica Hill (voiced by Liza Koshy) is a blunt, snarky news reporter who often weaves her personal issues into the current stories.
- Anthony (voiced by Akintoye) is Kevin's confident friend.
- Hiromi Tanaka (voiced by Hiromi Dames) is a girl who works at a comic bookstore and is also Kevin's crush.
- Murray Meyer (voiced by Brett Dalton) is the mayor of the city.
- Naya (voiced by Abby Espiritu) is the head cheerleader at Kevin and Fred's high school. A running gag involves her commenting on other characters' cartoonish disguises.
- Principal Funderberk (voiced by Keith Ferguson) is the principal of Kevin and Fred's high school.
- Clyde (voiced by Dan Povenmire) and Andrew (voiced by Jeff "Swampy" Marsh) are a pair of elderly men who are always playing chess throughout the city. They often witness the collateral damage from Hamster and Gretel's heroics, automatically assuming that they were staged as a distraction to sway the game.
- Mrs. Maybank (voiced by Lauren Tom) is the Grant-Gomez family's elderly neighbor with whom they share a complex. Her home is often affected by Hamster and Gretel's heroics, but her poor eyesight and forgetfulness prevent her from being too bothered by it. In "Who's Afraid of Mordros the Annihilator?", it is revealed that her first name is Lulu and that she once owned the chinchilla Nutmeg before he was transported into space and transformed into Mordros the Annihilator.
- Unseen aliens (voiced by Dan Povenmire and Joanna Hausmann) are unseen entities who empower others and create supervillains to prepare Hamster and Gretel to battle Mordros the Annihilator. In "Who's Afraid of Mordros the Annihilator?", it is revealed that the two's home planet was previously destroyed by Mordros and that they appear as living shadows because their true forms would destroy anyone who looks at them.
- Stacy Grant (voiced by Joanna Hausmann) is Fred's single mother and Kevin and Gretel's paternal aunt.
- General Huxley (voiced by Kevin Michael Richardson) is a general at the Tri-State Space Agency.
- Vicky Huxley (voiced by Cree Summer) is an astronaut commander at the Tri-State Space Agency and daughter of General Huxley who operated on Space Station Alpha Seneca.
- Main Computer (voiced by Bob Bowen) is a computer system on the Space Station Alpha Seneca.

=== Villains ===
- Jack Ampersand / Professor Exclamation (voiced by Phil LaMarr) is a punctuation-themed supervillain who has short arms due to losing his elbows in a freak accident and now wants to make the world bend to him.
- Lauren/The Destructress and Lyle/FistPuncher (voiced by Alyson Stoner and Brock Powell respectively) are fraternal twins who had an encounter with the same aliens as Hamster and Gretel, granting them similar powers. Unlike the latter, they were told to use their powers for evil, becoming supervillains as a result. Starting with "The Bitter Sitter", Lauren has a second job as a babysitter in order to have a non-evil hustle. However, Lauren later turned over a new leaf in the episode "Evil Upheaval" while Lyle maintains his evil ways. Lyle has attempted twice to get Lauren back on the side of evil.
- El Luchador (voiced by Carlos Alazraqui) is a wrestler-themed supervillain who loves ropa vieja.
- Rodney Thunderpants (voiced by James Adomian) is a cowboy who has electrokinesis and a deep hatred of cellphones.
- Van Dyke (voiced by Casey Hamilton) is a sentient Van Dyke beard who can possess people by attaching himself to their faces. After getting shredded by a lawnmower, he later puts himself back together as a moustache.
- Coach Haggerty (voiced by Betsy Sodaro) is a cheerleading coach that hypnotizes people to commit crimes for her using her whistle.
- La Cebolla (voiced by Karina La Voz) is a former telenovela star-turned-villainess who encountered the unseen aliens, granting her the ability to communicate with onions and onion-related plants.
- CopyCat (voiced by Eric Bauza) is a comic book geek with a huge trust fund and a degree in engineering who invents a super suit based on the comic book character "Man Cat."
- Neighslayer (voiced by Thomas Sanders) is a former track star who was mutated into a half-horse half-man mutant after an experiment gone awry. This left him with horse hooves in place of his human arms and legs.
- Dr. Eelgood (voiced by Keith Ferguson) is a mad scientist who has sworn revenge on the local aquarium and has genetically engineered a nearly indestructible eel. He was one of Dave's tenants, although he was evicted when his experiments were exposed.
  - Ideal Eel is an eel-like monster created by Dr. Eelgood. It was destroyed when Gretel froze it solid and Hamster accidentally dropped it.
- Bouncy Castle (voiced by Richie Moriarty) is a bouncy castle that was accidentally given life by the aliens who were trying to empower two nearby children. It sought revenge for all the times that people jumped in it. The Bouncy Castle was deflated by Hamster and Gretel.
- X-Terminator (voiced by John DiMaggio) is a supervillain who has a vendetta against rodents of all kinds after his human body was accidentally merged with his rat-catching device.
- The Amplifier (voiced by Khary Payton) is a supervillain with a ray gun that can dramatically increase the size of whatever it shoots.
- The Nightmarionette (voiced by Michael-Leon Wooley) is a villain who can create life-like projections of people's greatest fears.
- Bob Infantiburg / Big Baby (voiced by Brock Powell) is a former mayoral candidate and Veronica Hill's ex-boyfriend who accidentally turned himself into a kaiju-sized baby.
- Sloppy Joe Monster (vocal effects provided by Dee Bradley Baker) is a sloppy joe monster created from a leftover sloppy joe by the aliens. Its body was destroyed by Gretel and its brain was eaten by Churro.
- Tina (voiced by Camryn Grimes) is a new student in Gretel and Bailey's class who turns out to be a spy from the country of Bolgylvania.
- The Earworm (voiced by Adam Rose) is a songwriting supervillain whose evil jingle hypnotizes Hamster and Gretel.
- Christine DuPoulet / The East Side Bantam (voiced by Cree Summer) is the former chicken-like school mascot that tries to sabotage every school play after being replaced by the East Side Plumber mascot. She was said to have disappeared during the stage production of The Vikings of Venzance, but in reality, she fled due to severe stage fright and hid under the stage while dressed as the East Side Bantam. After being thwarted by Gretel, who also suffered from stage fright, Christine becomes the new mascot of "Frank's Discounted Discount Costumes".
- Record Scratch (voiced by Camryn Grimes) is a villain who can take over the world with her DJ skills. It was later revealed that she was just a disguise by the Imposter.
- Clovis Jerome Wojtowski / The Imposter (voiced by Diedrich Bader) is a villain who wears multiple disguises.
- Ernie (voiced by Brock Powell) is a villainous baker that attacks people with his "divorce cakes" after people refused to buy them.
- Belle (voiced by Karalynn Dunton) is a social media influencer who starts a smear campaign against Hamster and Gretel to increase her number of followers.
- Arthouse (voiced by Diedrich Bader) is a disgruntled film artist who produces mundane "short" films.
- Tchotchke Jones (voiced by Richard Kind) is a tchotchke shop owner, who shrinks historical landmarks and puts them in bottles.
- Micromanager (voiced by John Hodgman) is the owner of Small Burger and a former employee of Tall Burger who got fired after he accidentally shrunk himself with a device meant to shrink onions and now wants to literally destroy his competition.
- Charlie / Father Goose (voiced by Isaac Robinson-Smith) is a man with goose wings on his rear end who wants to bring about the next step of human evolution by turning the populace into geese.
- Helen / Rat Burglar (voiced by Rachel Dratch) is a villain dressed as a rat, who uses "Invisible Ink" on herself to secretly help her son Xavier cheat in contests without getting caught.
- Crimson Haste (voiced by Sarah Sherman) is a villainess with supersonic speed, who runs a rapid local delivery service by stealing the goods unnoticed.
- Bob Stanley Cashwell / Unknownzy (voiced by Isaac Robinson-Smith) is a masked villain who invested in, and later vandalized, Hiromi's mural.
- Stan / Pendulum Pete (voiced by Diedrich Bader) is a villain with grandfather clock pendulums for arms, who has a deep loathing for digital clocks.
- Inga the Ice Queen (voiced by Danielle Threet) is a Swiss cryokinetic villainess who owns an ice cream parlor and traps cool people in ice to force them to be her friends.
- La Sombrerona (voiced by Joanna Hausmann) is a villainess who wears five hats as a tribute to her five dead husbands, and now strives to strip everyone of their happiness.
- Simon (voiced by Brock Powell) is a talking nanobot who has the ability to control people and transform them into cyborgs.
- Julie Jennings / Dr. MedusaSaurus (voiced by Lexie Shoaibi) is an uncredited paleontologist who was trapped in a tar pit containing toxic waste for thirty years and was reawakened by the aliens, granting her the ability to reanimate dinosaur skeletons.
- Itsy Bitsy (voiced by Tessa Skara) is a villainess who was fused with a spider on her shoulder during an encounter with the aliens, gaining the ability to shoot spider-webs from her underarms.
- Bayou Barb (voiced by Jane Lynch) is a former diner employee who was fused to waffle irons and a toxic waste-infused tree, turning into a misunderstood monster and a local bayou legend.
- Librarian (voiced by Cree Summer) is the local librarian who wishes to make the city as quiet as her workplace by stealing the populace's voices using a Shush-inator she got from Dr. Doofenshmirtz.
- Mary Mitosis (voiced by Debra Wilson) is a villainess with the ability to duplicate herself.
- The Flake (voiced by Kyle Mooney) is a villain who gained the ability to turn into flakes after being fused with a croissant.
- Clem Clam (voiced by Richard Ayoade) is a man whose head transformed into a clam head after being covered in clam chowder and toxic waste.
- Demo Broz (voiced by Joel Armogasto Martinez and Andrew Santiago) - Luis and Jeffrey are twin construction workers who gained the power to levitate objects by high-fiving each other after their encounter with the aliens.
- FootKicker (voiced by Seth Green) is an inmate who becomes FistPuncher's new sidekick after a falling out with Destructress. He has an overgrown right foot resulting from a clinical trial, although his super strength is actually in his left foot thanks to the aliens.
- ACE (voiced by Carlos Alazraqui) is a robotic crossing guard who goes rogue and declares that humans are unfit to cross the street.
- Stress Ball Monster is a monster that was created from Hiromi's stress ball when the female alien felt pity for her. After Hamster threw it into outer space, the aliens took in the Stress Ball Monster.
- Connie McBurlap (voiced by Grey DeLisle) is a disgraced fashion designer who has invented a fabric that can control the movements of whoever wears it.
- Rosie / Dust Might (voiced by Kimberly Brooks) is a mail carrier and a supervillainess obsessed with antiques who can summon dust clouds and giant mites.
- Slamonade Stan (voiced by Bobby Moynihan) is a human-turned-flavored drink bottle who was fired as the Slamonade mascot after a youth focus group disapproved, and now wants revenge on the cool kids.
- Hank Franklin (voiced by Lance Krall) is a game show host and influencer with permanent ink on his face, who wants to prank the whole city.
- Carl (voiced by Sebastian Conelli) is a man who fused himself with a classic car in hopes of impressing his dismissive father.
- Felix Van Schurk (voiced by Brett Gelman) is a scientist that was found in a VHS by Gretel and Bailey after a failed attempt to become electricity and travel to a pizzeria.
- The Mud Singer (voiced by Stephen Kramer Glickman) is a mud-themed villain who Kevin fought when he ended up with Gretel's powers.
- Mordros the Annihilator (voiced by Alfred Molina) is a notorious planet-destroying villain who the aliens are preparing Hamster and Gretel to fight and who the other alien races fear. The episode "Who's Afraid of Mordros the Annihilator?" reveals that Mordros was originally a chinchilla named Nutmeg with a history with Mrs. Maybank who was transported into space during the 1960s and mutated by cosmic energy. Additionally, his name originated as an acronym for Project M.O.R.D.R.O.S. which is short for Military Office Research Deploying Rodent Orbital Study.
  - Robot Hamster & Gretel (voiced by Beck Bennett and Meli Povenmire) are robot counterparts of Hamster and Gretel who were created by Mordros the Annihilator to destroy the main duo. The robots were created by combining Hamster and Gretel's DNA with their network and have the same abilities as them.
  - Robot Kevin (voiced by Michael Cimino) is the robot counterpart of Kevin who was also created by Mordros the Annihilator. Since Mordros was not able to combine Kevin's DNA with the robot's network, he was instead depicted as a trash can. Dave later teaches him to love himself for who he is.
- Ludwig Von Shrute / The Conductor (voiced by Tom Kenny) is a symphony conductor villain that creates music-note-shaped laser drones in order to destroy the moon.
- Burt (voiced by Chris Diamantopoulos) is a bodybuilder who wants revenge on his old gym, where he was bullied for skipping leg day.

== Episodes ==
=== Series overview ===
Season	Episodes	Originally released	
Season	Episodes	First released	Last released
1	30	August 12, 2022	December 9, 2023
2	20	September 14, 2024	April 13, 2025

=== Season 1 (2022–23) ===
No. overall	No. in season	Title	Directed by	Written and storyboarded by	Original release date	Prod. code	U.S. viewers (millions)
1	1	"Empower Failure"	Dan Povenmire (Note: Additional directing for "Empower Failure" was done by Amber Tornquist Hollinger, while additional directing for "Oakey Dokey" was done by Tricia Garcia.)	Dan Povenmire	August 12, 2022	101	0.23
1	1	"Oakey Dokey"	Dan Povenmire	Written by : Dan Povenmire; Storyboarded by : Dan Povenmire & Rufino Roy Camacho II	August 12, 2022	101	0.23
"Empower Failure": High schooler Kevin Grant-Gomez is annoyed that he has to drive his little sister, Gretel, everywhere she has to go. One day, Kevin and Gretel are visited by aliens, who bestow superpowers on the siblings to use for good. Kevin is excited about having superpowers, but becomes less so when he learns that the aliens were actually in favor of Gretel's pet hamster, Hamster. As time goes by, Kevin becomes overprotective of Gretel, despite her now having superpowers, which she tends to overuse, in addition to being asked to keeping their powers a secret and only letting their cousin Fred in on it. Gretel eventually convinces Kevin that she and Hamster can take care of themselves, only for a villain named Professor Exclamation to capture the two. Kevin uses a clever plan to rescue Hamster and Gretel, which works and Gretel thanks Kevin for his support. "Oakey Dokey": After inadvertently causing a meteor shower, Gretel refuses to listen to Kevin's complicated instructions and uses her punching ability to destroy the meteor. However, a piece of the meteor ends up destroying Gretel's favorite tree, Oakey. Though upset at first, Gretel, along with Hamster, manages to fix Oakey up as if nothing ever happened. Meanwhile, the aliens give superpowers to twins named Lauren and Lyle and tell them to use the powers for evil.
2	2	"Recipe for Disaster"	Tricia Garcia	Written by : Jim Bernstein; Storyboarded by : Villamor M. Cruz & Tammy Manis	August 13, 2022	102	0.22
2	2	"Math Punch"	Amber Tornquist Hollinger	Written by : Joshua Pruett; Storyboarded by : Villamor M. Cruz & Allen Del Mar Oka	August 13, 2022	102	0.22
"Recipe for Disaster": After accidentally burning the family dinner, Hamster and Gretel search all over town for a replacement, while Kevin tries to prevent his mother, Carolina, from coming home too soon. "Math Punch": Hamster and Gretel face off against a lightning-charged cowboy as Dave, Kevin and Gretel's father, tries to impress Carolina on their anniversary.
3	3	"Superhero Sibling Rivalry"	Amber Tornquist Hollinger	Written by : Joshua Pruett; Storyboarded by : Allen Del Mar Oka & Heather Gregersen	August 20, 2022 (Note: This episode was first released on Disney+ on August 17, 2022.)	103	0.14
3	3	"Close Shave"	Tricia Garcia	Written by : Valerie Breiman; Storyboarded by : Rufino Roy Camacho II & Villamor M. Cruz	August 20, 2022	103	0.14
"Superhero Sibling Rivalry": After days of constant arguing, Carolina tells Kevin and Gretel that they need a break from each other. Kevin and Gretel go their separate ways, and while Hamster and Gretel end up fighting twin villains FistPuncher and The Destructress on their own, Kevin goes to the mall with Fred. "Close Shave": Gretel becomes suspicious of her substitute teacher, who she believes is evil.
4	4	"Cheer Cheer Bang Bang"	Amber Tornquist Hollinger	Written by : Amanda Domenech; Storyboarded by : Allen Del Mar Oka & Heather Gregersen	August 27, 2022	104	0.21
4	4	"La Ballad of La Cebolla"	Tricia Garcia	Written by : Alex Estrada; Storyboarded by : Rufino Roy Camacho II	August 27, 2022	104	0.21
"Cheer Cheer Bang Bang": Fred goes undercover as a cheerleader when she and Kevin learn that cheerleaders from their school are involved in bank robberies. "La Ballad of La Cebolla": Kevin, Hamster, and Gretel encounter a supervillain with the power to talk to onions.
5	5	"Comic Shop CopyCat"	Amber Tornquist Hollinger	Written by : Joshua Pruett; Storyboarded by : Allen Del Mar Oka & Heather Gregersen	September 3, 2022	105	0.18
5	5	"Neigh, It Ain't So!"	Tricia Garcia	Written by : Amanda Domenech; Storyboarded by : Tammy Manis	September 3, 2022	105	0.18
"Comic Shop CopyCat": While Kevin tries to gather the courage to talk to his crush Hiromi, Hamster and Gretel fight off a villain inspired by a comic book. "Neigh, It Ain't So!": Gretel's best friend, Bailey, who is unaware of Gretel's superhero persona despite their many similarities, wins a contest to spend a day with her. Gretel tries to avoid as much confrontation as possible to avoid suspicion, which grows more difficult when a half-man, half-horse mutant villain is on the loose.
6	6	"Saturday Homecoming Fever"	Amber Tornquist Hollinger	Written by : Amanda Domenech; Storyboarded by : Heather Gregersen, Allen Del Mar Oka & Eddie Pittman	September 10, 2022	106	0.24
6	6	"Dr. Eelgood"	Tricia Garcia	Written by : Alex Estrada; Storyboarded by : Villamor M. Cruz	September 10, 2022	106	0.24
"Saturday Homecoming Fever": Kevin hopes to gain a positive reputation at his school's homecoming dance and get rid of his nickname, "minivan kid", but FistPuncher and The Destructress crash the festivities. "Dr. Eelgood": Hamster and Gretel must fight a monstrous eel while shadowing Dave. Meanwhile, Kevin rushes through his responsibilities on a beach clean-up trip in order to spend some time with Hiromi.
7	7	"The Opposite of Smart"	Amber Tornquist Hollinger	Written by : Valerie Breiman; Storyboarded by : Heather Gregersen, Allen Del Mar Oka & Eddie Pittman	September 17, 2022	107	0.21
7	7	"Birthday Besties"	Tricia Garcia	Written by : Joanna Hausmann; Storyboarded by : Kyle Menke, Rufino Roy Camacho II, Su Jen Buchheim & Erik Kling	September 17, 2022	107	0.21
"The Opposite of Smart": The Grant-Gomez family dog, Churro, becomes an internet meme due to his dimwitted nature. Kevin lets his fame go to his head, which makes Gretel jealous. "Birthday Besties": Kevin and Gretel attend Bailey's birthday party while tracking down an unseen villain who has repeatedly vandalized birthday parties in the area.
8	8	"I'm Bored"	Tricia Garcia	Written by : Amanda Domenech; Storyboarded by : Su Jen Buchheim, Erik Kling & Tammy Manis	September 24, 2022	109	0.24
8	8	"Cutie and the Beast"	Tricia Garcia	Written by : Jim Bernstein; Storyboarded by : Su Jen Buchheim & Villamor M. Cruz	September 24, 2022	109	0.24
"I'm Bored": Gretel is bombarded with chores, leaving Kevin and Hamster to bond as they fight off a new villain, the X-terminator, without her. "Cutie and the Beast": After battling a size-altering villain dubbed the Amplifier, Hamster and Gretel are tasked with fighting a giant otter, but are hesitant because of its cuteness. Meanwhile, Kevin becomes increasingly jealous over not getting superpowers and tries to create his own superhero alter ego.
9	9	"The Nightmarionette"	Amber Tornquist Hollinger	Written by : Jim Bernstein; Storyboarded by : Heather Gregersen, Allen Del Mar Oka & Eddie Pittman	October 1, 2022	108	0.19
9	9	"Abuelita's World"	Amber Tornquist Hollinger	Written by : Joanna Hausmann; Storyboarded by : Heather Gregersen, Erik Kling, Allen Del Mar Oka & Eddie Pittman	October 1, 2022	108	0.19
"The Nightmarionette": Hamster and Gretel fight a supervillain who can materialize people's greatest fears. "Abuelita's World": Kevin and Gretel are babysat by their strict grandmother before a giant baby starts rampaging around the city.
10	10	"U.F. UH-OH!"	Amber Tornquist Hollinger	Written by : Valerie Breiman (part 1); Joshua Pruett (part 2); Storyboarded by : Erik Kling; Su Jen Buchheim, Heather Gregersen, Allen Del Mar Oka & Eddie Pittman (part 1 only); Rufino Roy Camacho II & Tammy Manis (part 2 only)	October 8, 2022	110	0.24
10	10	"U.F. UH-OH!"	Tricia Garcia	Written by : Valerie Breiman (part 1); Joshua Pruett (part 2); Storyboarded by : Erik Kling; Su Jen Buchheim, Heather Gregersen, Allen Del Mar Oka & Eddie Pittman (part 1 only); Rufino Roy Camacho II & Tammy Manis (part 2 only)	October 8, 2022	110	0.24
Part I: During a family trip to Las Vegas, Kevin, Hamster, and Gretel explore the city on their own, but while examining various memorabilia about Hamster and Gretel, Kevin starts to feel left out. Following a mishap, they manage to find the superpower-granting aliens, who start attacking the city. Gretel attempts to save the city from the aliens, only to get abducted. Kevin fails to rescue Gretel, although he manages to take a picture of a message the aliens left behind in a field. Meanwhile, Dave and Carolina are intrigued by a waterslide that they cannot access without their kids. Part II: With help from Fred, Kevin and Hamster decipher the aliens' message and track them down. Meanwhile, the aliens, revealed to be FistPuncher and The Destructress, are holding Gretel captive and reveal that they are plotting to destroy the Hoover Dam. Gretel manages to aggravate them by acting like an annoying younger sibling, buying Kevin and Hamster time to rescue her. While Kevin takes control of the ship and frees Gretel, Hamster defeats FistPuncher and The Destructress. Subsequently, Hamster and Gretel unknowingly ruin Dave and Carolina's plans in attempting to save the city from a flood after the dam breaks. Later on, as the Grant-Gomez family reconvenes, Kevin and Gretel begin to question the real aliens' motives.
11	11	"Grounded"	Tricia Garcia	Written by : Valerie Breiman & Joshua Pruett; Storyboarded by : Su Jen Buchheim, Rufino Roy Camacho II & Tammy Manis	November 12, 2022	111	0.24
11	11	"Sleepover with the Enemy"	Amber Tornquist Hollinger & Erik Kling	Written by : Joanna Hausmann & Alex Estrada; Storyboarded by : Heather Gregersen, Erik Kling, Allen Del Mar Oka & Eddie Pittman	November 12, 2022	111	0.24
"Grounded": While investigating a UFO sighting, Gretel unintentionally neglects her chores, getting herself grounded for the entire weekend. She must now figure out how to fight a mutated sloppy joe while confined to her room. "Sleepover with the Enemy": Gretel and Bailey's plans for a sleepover are altered by Tina, a questionable new student in their class.
12	12	"Friday Night Fright"	Amber Tornquist Hollinger & Erik Kling	Written by : Amanda Domenech; Storyboarded by : Heather Gregersen, Erik Kling & Allen Del Mar Oka	November 19, 2022	112	0.22
12	12	"The Earworm"	Tricia Garcia	Written by : Valerie Breiman; Storyboarded by : Rufino Roy Camacho II, Tammy Manis, Su Jen Buchheim & Villamor M. Cruz	November 19, 2022	112	0.22
"Friday Night Fright": While the Grant-Gomez family holds a family game night at their house, Fred and Hiromi team up to prevent robots from taking over the high school. "The Earworm": Hamster and Gretel find themselves hypnotized by the jingle for a new breakfast cereal.
13	13	"A Mammoth Problem"	Amber Tornquist Hollinger & Erik Kling	Written by : Jim Bernstein; Storyboarded by : Su Jen Buchheim, Joseph Chang, Heather Gregersen, Erik Kling, Allen Del Mar Oka & Eddie Pittman	November 26, 2022	113	0.18
13	13	"The Bantam of the Elementary School Light Opera"	Tricia Garcia	Written by : Alex Estrada; Storyboarded by : Su Jen Buchheim, Rufino Roy Camacho II, Erik Kling, Villamor M. Cruz & Tammy Manis	November 26, 2022	113	0.18
"A Mammoth Problem": Gretel's science project, a glacier, is accidentally destroyed by Professor Exclamation's son Nordle releasing a woolly mammoth into the city. With Hamster preoccupied, the two must team up to stop it. "The Bantam of the Elementary School Light Opera": Gretel has to replace the lead role in the elementary school play, which she is nervous about due to her stage fright. All the while, a series of strange occurrences interrupt the production.
14	14	"Hamnesia"	Amber Tornquist Hollinger & Erik Kling	Written by : Jim Bernstein; Storyboarded by : Su Jen Buchheim, Heather Gregersen, Erik Kling, Allen Del Mar Oka & Eddie Pittman	February 4, 2023	114	0.13
14	14	"Romancing the Scone"	Tricia Garcia	Written by : Jim Bernstein; Storyboarded by : Rufino Roy Camacho II, Erik Kling, Villamor M. Cruz & Tammy Manis	February 4, 2023	114	0.13
"Hamnesia": Hamster gets amnesia after getting hit by a truck and is taken in by a boy named Billy, while Gretel and Kevin try to search for Hamster. "Romancing the Scone": While Gretel and Nordle are forced to do a book report together, they encounter a robot and a scone that was given powers by the aliens. Meanwhile, Kevin takes Hamster to the vet.
15	15	"For Whom the Belle Trolls"	Amber Tornquist Hollinger & Erik Kling	Written by : Valerie Breiman; Storyboarded by : Joseph Chang, Su Jen Buchheim, Erik Kling, Heather Gregersen, Eddie Pittman, Allen Del Mar Oka & Dota Sata	February 11, 2023 (Note: This episode was first released on Disney+ on February 8, 2023.)	115	0.18
15	15	"An Arthouse Divided"	Tricia Garcia	Written by : Alex Estrada; Storyboarded by : Rufino Roy Camacho II & Heather Gregersen	February 11, 2023	115	0.18
"For Whom the Belle Trolls": When a social media influencer named Belle starts a smear campaign against Hamster and Gretel, Bailey tries to clear their names. "An Arthouse Divided": At an advanced screening of a movie, a film producer named Arthouse forces people at the theater to watch his boring movie instead.
16	16	"The Litigator vs. The Luchador"	Jordan Rosato	Written by : Amanda Domenech; Storyboarded by : Tammy Manis & Su Jen Buchheim	February 18, 2023	116	0.19
16	16	"Strawberry Fest Forever"	Erik Kling	Written by : Valerie Breiman; Storyboarded by : Rufino Roy Camacho II, Villamor M. Cruz & Derek Lee Thompson	February 18, 2023	116	0.19
"The Litigator vs. The Luchador": When El Luchador escapes from prison, Hamster, Gretel, and Kevin sneak into a wrestling match to find him. Meanwhile, Carolina becomes suspicious of her sister, Melissa ("Meli"), who appears to be hiding something from her. "Strawberry Fest Forever": Gretel and Carolina go to what they think is a strawberry festival. Meanwhile, Dave and Kevin visit their neighbor, Mrs. Maybank, for a repair job, but they get sidetracked by her storytelling.
17	17	"The Bottle Episode"	Jordan Rosato	Written by : Alex Estrada & Joanna Hausmann; Storyboarded by : Mike Sobieski & Derek Lee Thompson	February 25, 2023	117	0.17
17	17	"Micromanager"	Tricia Garcia	Written by : Jim Bernstein & Joshua Pruett; Storyboarded by : Joseph Chang & Dota Sata	February 25, 2023	117	0.17
"The Bottle Episode": A shopkeeper named Tchotchke Jones has been shrinking the world's landmarks and trapping them in bottles. He then traps Hamster, Gretel, and Kevin, and Fred must save them. "Micromanager": Kevin gets a job at a Small Burger joint and tries to compete with another employee named Anthony, but they inadvertently help their manager with a scheme to destroy the neighboring burger joint, Tall Burger. Meanwhile, Hamster and Gretel workout, but they soon have no energy left to defeat any villains.
18	18	"When Life Gives You Lemons"	Erik Kling	Story by : Joanna Hausmann; Teleplay by : Alex Estrada; Storyboarded by : Rufino Roy Camacho II & Heather Gregersen	March 4, 2023	118	0.13
18	18	"Self-HEELP!"	Tricia Garcia	Written by : Amanda Domenech & Joanna Hausmann; Storyboarded by : Su Jen Buchheim, Rufino Roy Camacho II & Tammy Manis	March 4, 2023	118	0.13
"When Life Gives You Lemons": Gretel and Bailey make a business deal with Nordle to gain more revenue from their lemonade stand, but are not thrilled with the results. Meanwhile, Kevin and Hamster play pool in Fred's basement. "Self-HEELP!": Fred is selected as a VIP guest for her cheerful mother's motivational seminar, but the event gets out of hand when a new villain arrives, plotting to attack the populace with geese.
19	19	"My Invisible Friend"	Jordan Rosato	Written by : Jim Bernstein & Amanda Domenech; Storyboarded by : Su Jen Buchheim & Villamor M. Cruz	March 11, 2023	119	0.18
19	19	"The Bitter Sitter"	Erik Kling	Written by : Valerie Breiman; Storyboarded by : Joseph Chang, Dota Sata & Derek Lee Thompson	March 11, 2023	119	0.18
"My Invisible Friend": While Bailey prepares to compete in a spelling bee against her rival, Xavier, Hamster and Gretel are forced to fight a villain who calls herself "Rat Burglar" and steals Invisible Ink to secretly commit her crimes. During the fight, Gretel gets drenched in the ink, forcing Kevin, Hamster, and Fred to look for a remedy. At the spelling bee, Gretel exposes Rat Burglar helping Xavier, who is revealed to be her son, cheat, disqualifying Xavier and allowing Bailey to win. Later, Bailey finds out about Gretel's heroine identity and faints. "The Bitter Sitter": Continuing from "My Invisible Friend", Bailey is angry at Gretel for lying to her the whole time, while Lauren (The Destructress) babysits the two. Meanwhile, Kevin is forced to go to an interactive murder mystery play with Dave, Carolina, and Bailey's parents, only to find out that a lazy man is actually paying them to clean his house and fix his appliances.
20	20	"Let's Sea What You've Got"	Tricia Garcia	Written by : Valerie Breiman; Storyboarded by : Su Jen Buchheim & Heather Gregersen	June 24, 2023	120	0.13
20	20	"Churro's Day Out"	Jordan Rosato	Written by : Amanda Domenech; Storyboarded by : Rufino Roy Camacho II & Dota Sata	June 24, 2023	120	0.13
"Let's Sea What You've Got": While at the beach, Gretel experiments with her superpowers with the help of Bailey, but their actions inadvertently lure several invasive species to the lagoon. "Churro's Day Out": While the Grant-Gomez family gets a portrait done by an artist who doesn't allow pets, Hamster and Fred have to chase Churro throughout the city after Hamster accidentally lets him out of the house.
21	21	"Crimson Haste Makes Waste"	Erik Kling	Written by : Joshua Pruett; Storyboarded by : Joseph Chang & Tammy Manis	July 1, 2023	121	0.07≥
21	21	"The Break-Stuff Club"	Tricia Garcia	Written by : Alex Estrada; Storyboarded by : Villamor M. Cruz & Derek Lee Thompson	July 1, 2023	121	0.07≥
"Crimson Haste Makes Waste": Hamster and Gretel have to fend off a speedy villainess during a visit to the mall. Meanwhile, Kevin is busy helping Hiromi film a commercial for a new product. "The Break-Stuff Club": When Hiromi's school mural is vandalized, Kevin intentionally lands himself in Saturday detention so he can find the culprit.
22	22	"Over the Hill"	Jordan Rosato	Written by : Valerie Breiman; Storyboarded by : Olivia Day & Brandon Kruse	July 8, 2023	122	N/A
22	22	"The Ice Queen Cometh"	Erik Kling	Written by : Filip Jeremic; Storyboarded by : Heather Gregersen & Tammy Manis	July 8, 2023	122	N/A
"Over the Hill": Gretel and Bailey shadow Veronica Hill as she competes for a promotion, but her rival turns out to be nothing more than a puppet of Van Dyke. "The Ice Queen Cometh": While visiting a new ice cream store, Kevin, Hamster, and Gretel are attacked by an ice-themed villainess.
23	23	"La Sombrerona"	Tricia Garcia	Story by : Joanna Hausmann & Jim Bernstein; Teleplay by : Jim Bernstein; Storyboarded by : Su Jen Buchheim, Rufino Roy Camacho II & Dota Sata	July 15, 2023	123	0.08
23	23	"Two Girls, a Guy, and the Council of Düm"	Jordan Rosato	Written by : Alex Estrada; Storyboarded by : Joseph Chang & Tammy Manis	July 15, 2023	123	0.08
"La Sombrerona": Hamster and Gretel have to fight a villainess who is stealing the happiness of patrons at the local carnival, but realize the only way to do it is to cheer her up by hosting a party. Meanwhile, Kevin tries desperately to win a stuffed bear for Hiromi. "Two Girls, a Guy, and the Council of Düm": Nordle invites Gretel and Bailey over for dinner. At the same time, Professor Exclamation calls a meeting with fellow villains The Earworm, La Cebolla, and The Nightmarionette, in order to plot revenge on Hamster and Gretel.
24	24	"Nano a Nano"	Erik Kling	Written by : Jim Bernstein; Storyboarded by : Villamor M. Cruz & Derek Lee Thompson	October 14, 2023	124	0.11
24	24	"The Unnatural History of Dr. MedusaSaurus Ph.D."	Tricia Garcia	Written by : Joshua Pruett; Storyboarded by : Su Jen Buchheim, Olivia Day & Brandon Kruse	October 14, 2023	124	0.11
"Nano a Nano": During a school field trip to a robotics factory, Gretel's classmate, Kelly, accidentally falls under control of a nanobot. Meanwhile, Kevin and Hamster help Fred give away mementos from previous battles, but struggle to part with any of them. "The Unnatural History of Dr. MedusaSaurus Ph.D.": At the natural history museum, the aliens awaken deceased paleontologist Dr. MedusaSaurus, who goes on a rampage alongside a reanimated fossil army.
25	25	"No Sprain, No Gain"	Jordan Rosato	Written by : Amanda Domenech; Storyboarded by : Su Jen Buchheim & Heather Gregersen	October 21, 2023	125	0.11
25	25	"Finding Professor Ex"	Erik Kling	Story by : Jim Bernstein & Alex Estrada; Teleplay by : Jim Bernstein; Storyboarded by : Dota Sata & Rufino Roy Camacho II	October 21, 2023	125	0.11
"No Sprain, No Gain": Kevin refuses to accompany Hamster and Gretel on their latest mission due to his sprained ankle and his embarrassment over the girly scooter he is given. "Finding Professor Ex": Gretel and Nordle go on a quest to locate the missing Professor Exclamation, following his defeat in "Two Girls, A Guy, and the Council of Düm". Meanwhile, Kevin, Fred, and Hamster bet on how long they can go without using technology.
26	26	"Bayou Barb"	Tricia Garcia	Written by : Filip Jeremic; Storyboarded by : Su Jen Buchheim, Joseph Chang, Heather Gregersen & Tammy Manis	October 28, 2023	126	0.10
26	26	"The Great Pillow War"	Jordan Rosato	Written by : Valerie Breiman & Amanda Domenech; Storyboarded by : Villamor M. Cruz & Derek Lee Thompson	October 28, 2023	126	0.10
"Bayou Barb": While on a trip to the bayou, Kevin and Gretel attempt to solve the legend of a creature named Bayou Barb. "The Great Pillow War": Kevin and Gretel invite Fred, Bailey, and Anthony over for an intense pillow fight. Babysitter Lauren joins in, which upsets Lyle, leading to infighting among the supervillain twins.
27	27	"Shush Hour"	Erik Kling	Written by : Joshua Pruett; Storyboarded by : Olivia Day & Brandon Kruse	November 4, 2023	127	0.13
27	27	"I Was a Teenage Mad Scientist"	Tricia Garcia	Written by : Alex Estrada & Joanna Hausmann; Storyboarded by : Su Jen Buchheim & Heather Gregersen	November 4, 2023	127	0.13
"Shush Hour": Gretel has to write an essay on her hero, and decides to write about herself. However, her plans are disrupted when she and Hamster have to fight off an evil librarian. "I Was a Teenage Mad Scientist": Professor Exclamation attends his reunion at Kevin and Fred's high school. This is just a ruse, as he searches for a rare element needed for his latest plot to destroy Hamster and Gretel.
28	28	"Too Many Crooks"	Jordan Rosato	Written by : Valerie Breiman; Storyboarded by : Dota Sata & Rufino Roy Camacho II	November 11, 2023	128	0.11
28	28	"President Fred"	Erik Kling	Written by : Joanna Hausmann & Filip Jeremic; Storyboarded by : Joseph Chang & Tammy Manis	November 11, 2023	128	0.11
"Too Many Crooks": A self-duplicating villainess commits robberies throughout town. Gretel must stop her alone, with Kevin and Hamster bedridden and Fred out of town. "President Fred": Desiring change, Kevin implores Fred to run for student body president, but the task of overcoming her opponent, Chad Goldenboy, proves more complicated than they thought.
29	29	"Flake It Till You Make It"	Tricia Garcia	Written by : Jim Bernstein; Storyboarded by : Villamor M. Cruz & Derek Lee Thompson	December 2, 2023	129	0.20
29	29	"Game Changer"	Jordan Rosato	Written by : Amanda Domenech; Storyboarded by : Olivia Day & Brandon Kruse	December 2, 2023	129	0.20
"Flake It Till You Make It": Hamster and Gretel must take down a villain who can turn into flakes, but this repeatedly gets in the way of Gretel and Dave's preparations for the father-daughter dance. "Game Changer": Kevin, Fred, Anthony, and Hiromi all enter a video game tournament, only to get much more than they bargained for. Meanwhile, Kevin works up the courage to ask Hiromi out on a date.
30	30	"Exclamation Strikes Back"	Tricia Garcia	Story by : Joshua Pruett; Teleplay by : Alex Estrada & Joanna Hausmann; Storyboarded by : Rufino Roy Camacho II & Dota Sata (part 1); Su Jen Buchheim & Heather Gregersen (part 2)	December 9, 2023	130	0.15
30	30	"Exclamation Strikes Back"	Erik Kling	Story by : Joshua Pruett; Teleplay by : Alex Estrada & Joanna Hausmann; Storyboarded by : Rufino Roy Camacho II & Dota Sata (part 1); Su Jen Buchheim & Heather Gregersen (part 2)	December 9, 2023	130	0.15
Part I: Hamster and Gretel are to be given the key to the city, while Kevin has his first date with Hiromi. Meanwhile, Professor Exclamation teams up with The Destructess and FistPuncher to embark on his last step to destroy Hamster and Gretel and conquer the world. Exclamation disguises a robot as Hiromi to capture Kevin, while The Destructess and FistPuncher disrupt the ceremony. Hamster and Gretel go to an abandoned doll factory to rescue Kevin but get trapped as well. Professor Exclamation then uses a ray to take away Hamster and Gretel's superpowers and use them to power a giant power suit that he plans to use to enslave the world. Meanwhile, the real Hiromi waits for Kevin to have their date, unaware of the chaos ensuing throughout town. Part II: In his new power suit, Professor Exclamation forces the reluctant populace to help him destroy City Hall. Fred and Bailey manage to sneak away in order to rescue Hamster, Gretel, and Kevin. The team attempts to punch a powerful rock that contains Hamster and Gretel's superpowers that power up Exclamation's power suit but fail. Upon realizing that the key to the city that Hamster and Gretel got is made of the same substance that powers the suit, Kevin uses the key to strike the rock, which restores Hamster and Gretel's powers. When Kevin finally arrives for his date with Hiromi, she decides that there isn't a way to make the relationship work and politely breaks up with him. When Gretel apologizes to Kevin for ruining his date and breaking up with Hiromi, he thanked her but he said that it's not her fault for what she did. The aliens then arrive and reveal that they created villains in order to prepare Hamster and Gretel for a greater evil that will arrive "next season" and that Kevin was never intended to receive superpowers.

=== Season 2 (2024–25) ===
No. overall	No. in season	Title	Directed by	Written and storyboarded by	Original release date	Prod. code	U.S. viewers (millions) (Note: These ratings combine the amount of viewers watching the premieres of episodes on Disney Channel and Disney XD, which simulcasts the premieres.)
31	1	"Hakuna Ma Kevin"	Jordan Rosato	Written by : Filip Jeremic; Storyboarded by : Joseph Chang & Tammy Manis	September 14, 2024	201	0.12
31	1	"The Great American Telenovela"	Erik Kling	Written by : Alex Estrada; Storyboarded by : Villamor M. Cruz & Derek Lee Thompson	September 14, 2024	201	0.12
"Hakuna Ma Kevin": Following the events of "Exclamation Strikes Back", Kevin attends a retreat to destress. But when a clam-themed villain attacks a singles cruise ship, he proves too mellow to help Hamster and Gretel save the day. "The Great American Telenovela": Carolina gets cast in a telenovela, whose set is sabotaged by a vengeful La Cebolla.
32	2	"Lair Necessities"	Tricia Garcia	Written by : Amanda Domenech & Joshua Pruett; Storyboarded by : Brandon Kruse & Olivia Day	September 14, 2024	202	0.09
32	2	"Tobor or Not Tobor"	Jordan Rosato	Written by : Jim Bernstein; Storyboarded by : Su Jen Buchheim & Heather Gregersen	September 14, 2024	202	0.09
"Lair Necessities": Needing a private space to discuss their hero work, Kevin and Fred consider remodeling their childhood fort in the woods. Meanwhile, Hamster and Gretel fight a pair of telekinetic home remodelers who are uprooting the city to find lost treasure. "Tobor or Not Tobor": Behind Nordle's back, who is still bitter about his father's defeat, Hamster and Gretel recruit Tobor as a sparring partner to train them for the oncoming threat.
33	3	"Evil Upheaval"	Erik Kling	Written by : Valerie Breiman; Storyboarded by : Dota Sata & Rufino Roy Camacho II	September 21, 2024 (Note: This episode was first released on Disney+ on September 18, 2024.)	203	0.13
33	3	"Ay, Ay, A.I."	Tricia Garcia	Written by : Alexis Pereira; Storyboarded by : Joseph Chang & Tammy Manis	September 21, 2024	203	0.13
"Evil Upheaval": The Destructress grows tired of being a villain, which puts her at odds with FistPuncher. Meanwhile, Hamster and Gretel search for a new set of superhero costumes. "Ay, Ay, A.I.": Gretel and Bailey's favorite crossing guard, Mertha, is being replaced by an AI, who quickly goes rogue. Meanwhile, Kevin's first client at his new petsitting business tasks him with watching a herd of goats.
34	4	"Stress Brawl"	Jordan Rosato	Written by : Alex Estrada & Joanna Hausmann; Storyboarded by : Villamor M. Cruz & Derek Lee Thompson	September 21, 2024	204	0.11
34	4	"I Love Luchie"	Erik Kling	Written by : Filip Jeremic; Storyboarded by : Olivia Day & Brandon Kruse	September 21, 2024	204	0.11
"Stress Brawl": While Hiromi is tasked with setting up her own Plumber Pride award ceremony, the aliens mutate her stress ball into a monster that feeds on her growing stress. "I Love Luchie": A reformed Luchador moves in next door with his new sweetheart, which makes Kevin and Gretel suspicious.
35	5	"The More the Meteor"	Bob Bowen & Tricia Garcia	Story by : Joanna Hausmann & Joshua Pruett; Teleplay by : Bob Bowen & Joshua Pruett; Storyboarded by : Su Jen Buchheim & Heather Gregersen	September 28, 2024	205	0.15
35	5	"My Hammie Vice"	Jordan Rosato	Written by : Jim Bernstein; Storyboarded by : Dota Sata & Rufino Roy Camacho II	September 28, 2024	205	0.15
"The More the Meteor": Hamster and Gretel are tasked with defending a military space station against a homing meteoroid shower. "My Hammie Vice": After several endangered animals go missing from the zoo, Hamster infiltrates The Syndicate, where his new comrades appreciate his ideas more than his usual crowd.
36	6	"Last Fred Standing"	Erik Kling	Written by : Amanda Domenech; Storyboarded by : Joseph Chang & Tammy Manis	September 28, 2024	206	0.12
36	6	"From Dust Till Dawn"	Tricia Garcia	Written by : Alexis Pereira; Storyboarded by : Villamor M. Cruz & Derek Lee Thompson	September 28, 2024	206	0.12
"Last Fred Standing": Fred competes with her childhood rival, Fredrick, over the right to the nickname Fred. "From Dust Till Dawn": Kevin and Gretel repair their grandmother's broken teapot, only to have it stolen by a dust-themed villain obsessed with antiques.
37	7	"I Think Therefore I Slam"	Erik Kling	Written by : Alex Estrada, Alexis Pereira, & Joshua Pruett; Storyboarded by : Su Jen Buchheim & Heather Gregersen	October 5, 2024	207	0.10
37	7	"Thanks, But No Pranks"	Jordan Rosato	Written by : Valerie Breiman; Storyboarded by : Brandon Kruse & Olivia Day	October 5, 2024	207	0.10
"I Think Therefore I Slam": Gretel and Bailey try to impress the cooler, older kids. At the same time, their school is attacked by a vengeful drink mascot. "Thanks, But No Pranks": Kevin and Anthony engage in a prank war in hopes of getting onto a game show.
38	8	"The Silence of the Tchotchkes"	Jordan Rosato	Written by : Alex Estrada; Storyboarded by : Joseph Chang & Tammy Manis	October 5, 2024	208	0.10
38	8	"A Car is Born"	Tricia Garcia	Written by : Filip Jeremic; Storyboarded by : Dota Sata & Rufino Roy Camacho II	October 5, 2024	208	0.10
"The Silence of the Tchotchkes": After Tchotchke Jones' shrink ray is stolen and used on Kevin, Fred teams up with its old owner to determine who this new villain is. "A Car is Born": Kevin attempts to trade in his minivan for a new car. Meanwhile, Hamster and Gretel fight a car-human hybrid who is stealing car parts.
39	9	"Who's in Charge?"	Erik Kling	Written by : Jim Bernstein; Storyboarded by : Villamor M. Cruz & Derek Lee Thompson	October 12, 2024	209	0.12
39	9	"Fools of Engagement"	Tricia Garcia	Written by : Valerie Breiman; Storyboarded by : Olivia Day & Brandon Kruse	October 12, 2024	209	0.12
"Who's in Charge?": Gretel and Bailey boot up an old VHS, only to discover a scientist trapped inside it. Meanwhile, Kevin ends up in a rainy day competition with his dad. "Fools of Engagement": Gretel and Kevin grow suspicious of Lauren after they find her working at the mall. At the same time, FistPuncher and FootKicker attempt to get her fired in hopes of turning her back to villainy.
40	10	"The New Adventures of Super Kevin"	Jordan Rosato	Story by : Jim Bernstein & Alexis Pereira; Teleplay by : Jim Bernstein (part 1); Alexis Pereira (part 2); Storyboarded by : Su Jen Buchheim; Heather Gregersen (part 1 only)	October 12, 2024	210	0.11
40	10	"The New Adventures of Super Kevin"	Erik Kling	Story by : Jim Bernstein & Alexis Pereira; Teleplay by : Jim Bernstein (part 1); Alexis Pereira (part 2); Storyboarded by : Su Jen Buchheim; Heather Gregersen (part 1 only)	October 12, 2024	210	0.11
Part I: At Nordle's yard sale, Kevin and Fred search for something that can aid them against the alien threat they've been warned about. Kevin buys a pendant that transfers Gretel's powers into him when they both touch it, allowing him to temporarily become a superhero, which Gretel is okay with. Kevin grows to enjoy the fame that comes from being Super Guy and lets his ego get the better of him, even demanding that he gets to spend more time using them. Later on, the aliens enter Gretel into an intergalactic fighting tournament, unaware that she has been powered down. Part II: Despite lacking both her powers and Hamster's aid, Gretel manages to progress in the tournament by using her wits. Meanwhile, Hamster and Fred call Kevin out on his selfishness. After Gretel discloses her situation, Kevin and Hamster are beamed to the arena right as Gretel has to face Skull Pulverizer, who has caught on to her tactics. Fred informs Kevin that he can return Gretel's powers by destroying the pendant, but at the cost of him never receiving powers again. Prioritizing his sister's safety, he makes the sacrifice, allowing Gretel to come out on top. The aliens arrive to congratulate her. Upon being asked by Kevin, the aliens reveal that the alien threat's name is Mordros the Annihilator as the other aliens present react fearfully to that name.
41	11	"The Search for Super Guy"	Tricia Garcia	Written by : Amanda Domenech; Storyboarded by : Joseph Chang & Tammy Manis	October 19, 2024	211	0.10
41	11	"Lorraine, Rattle, and Roll"	Jordan Rosato	Written by : Filip Jeremic; Storyboarded by : Villamor M. Cruz & Derek Lee Thompson	October 19, 2024	211	0.10
"The Search for Super Guy": Following his defeat in "The New Adventures of Super Kevin", Mud Singer wants to exact revenge on Super Guy, unaware of his true identity. At the same time, Hiromi is encouraged by an acclaimed journalist to hunt down Super Guy and expose his identity. "Lorraine, Rattle, and Roll": At Nordle's birthday party, his aunt Lorraine drops by to pick up her guitar, only to find that it's rigged to send her into an alternate universe.
42	12	"Last Train to Dullsville"	Bob Bowen	Written by : Alexis Pereira; Storyboarded by : Olivia Day & Brandon Kruse	January 12, 2025	212	0.10
42	12	"Fred of State"	Tricia Garcia	Written by : Alex Estrada; Storyboarded by : Su Jen Buchheim & Heather Gregersen	January 12, 2025	212	0.10
"Last Train to Dullsville": While on a train ride with his family, Dave accidentally receives a briefcase and is mistaken for the secret agent it belongs to. When the real agent comes looking for the case, Kevin and Gretel mistake him for a villain. "Fred of State": After School President Chad Goldenboy is abruptly kidnapped, Fred fills in for him as Hamster and Gretel try to figure out where he wound up.
43	13	"Hamster Ex Machina"	Jordan Rosato	Written by : Jim Bernstein; Storyboarded by : Rufino Roy Camacho II & Dota Sata	January 19, 2025	213	0.15
43	13	"Awkwardly Ever After"	Erik Kling	Written by : Valerie Breiman; Storyboarded by : Joseph Chang & Tammy Manis	January 19, 2025	213	0.15
"Hamster Ex Machina": Hamster and Gretel have to fight robotic doppelgängers of themselves who can predict their every move. "Awkwardly Ever After": After FistPuncher and FootKicker destroy her school in an attempt to get her back on the side of evil, Lauren enrolls in Kevin's class and harbors a crush on him, despite his lingering feelings for Hiromi.
44	14	"Paging Doctor Potatini"	Tricia Garcia	Written by : Joanna Hausmann; Storyboarded by : Villamor M. Cruz & Derek Lee Thompson	January 26, 2025	214	0.16
44	14	"Snazzy Pantzz"	Jordan Rosato	Written by : Claire Epstein; Storyboarded by : Olivia Day & Brandon Kruse	January 26, 2025	214	0.16
"Paging Doctor Potatini": Kevin is mistaken for Dr. Potatini, an esteemed teenage doctor, but has to go along with the bit in order to stop Ernie's schemes. "Snazzy Pantzz": Gretel and Carolina join a business named Snazzy Pantzz to sell as many pants as possible for the chance to win a vacation, unaware that they are aiding one of Connie McBurlap's schemes.
45	15	"Gentlemen Prefer Fronds"	Erik Kling	Written by : Filip Jeremic; Storyboarded by : Su Jen Buchheim & Heather Gregersen	February 2, 2025	215	0.11
45	15	"Sock It to Me, Bailey!"	Tricia Garcia	Written by : Amanda Domenech; Storyboarded by : Rufino Roy Camacho II & Dota Sata	February 2, 2025	215	0.11
"Gentlemen Prefer Fronds": In a competition for the school botany club, Nordle cheats by using some of his father's evil potions, but his experiments quickly get out of hand. "Sock It to Me, Bailey!": Gretel snags some trendy new headphones, only to learn that they're part of Earworm's latest hypnosis scheme.
46	16	"No Powers Day"	Jordan Rosato	Written by : Jim Bernstein; Storyboarded by : Joseph Chang & Tammy Manis	March 16, 2025	216	0.13
46	16	"Everybody Loves Main Computer"	Erik Kling	Written by : Alex Estrada; Storyboarded by : Katherine Crossan, Villamor M. Cruz & Derek Lee Thompson	March 16, 2025	216	0.13
"No Powers Day": Kevin has Gretel do a training exercise where she cannot use her powers, but his tests are interrupted by a group known as the Mountain Men. Meanwhile, Hamster attends a preschool meet-and-greet only to be accosted by the children who are upset that Gretel isn't present. "Everybody Loves Main Computer": The main computer, who escaped the space station during the events of "The More the Meteor", struggles to find himself and forms a friendship with Kevin.
47	17	"Gretel Keeps It Reel"	Tricia Garcia	Written by : Alexis Pereira; Storyboarded by : Olivia Day & Brandon Kruse	March 23, 2025	217	0.10
47	17	"Squeaky Friday"	Jordan Rosato	Written by : Valerie Breiman; Storyboarded by : Su Jen Buchheim & Heather Gregersen	March 23, 2025	217	0.10
"Gretel Keeps It Reel": Gretel and Dave partake in a father-daughter fishing contest that Kevin suspects is being sabotaged. Despite her lack of fishing ability, Gretel must win the contest in order to save the day. "Squeaky Friday": While recovering a mysterious remote, Hamster and Churro accidentally swap bodies, which complicates things as Gretel struggles against a bodybuilder villain and Dave heads to the dog park.
48	18	"Gran Slam"	Erik Kling	Written by : Joanna Hausmann & Filip Jeremic; Storyboarded by : Rufino Roy Camacho II & Dota Sata	March 30, 2025	218	N/A
48	18	"The Art of Deception"	Tricia Garcia	Story by : Claire Epstein & Joanna Hausmann; Teleplay by : Claire Epstein; Storyboarded by : Joseph Chang & Tammy Manis	March 30, 2025	218	N/A
"Gran Slam": As Dave and Carolina renew their wedding vows, Kevin and Gretel try to stop their grandmothers from arguing over the venue's decorations. Meanwhile, Clem Clam attempts to mess up the venue as an act of revenge. "The Art of Deception": Hiromi unknowingly uses truth gas in her art project, which plunges the art show into chaos. Meanwhile, Kevin, Hamster, and Gretel infiltrate the school to swipe some of Hiromi's files and preserve Hamster and Gretel's identities.
49	19	"Miss Direct"	Jordan Rosato	Written by : Amanda Domenech & Claire Epstein; Storyboarded by : Katherine Crossan & Villamor M. Cruz	April 6, 2025	219	0.14
49	19	"Trading Faces"	Erik Kling	Written by : Valerie Breiman & Filip Jeremic; Storyboarded by : Brandon Kruse & Olivia Day	April 6, 2025	219	0.14
"Miss Direct": Hiromi fakes a villain persona to lure Hamster and Gretel into an interview. Meanwhile, Kevin contemplates telling Hiromi the truth regarding Hamster and Gretel's identities. "Trading Faces": Hiromi discovers that her mentor Ms. Knight is actually The Impostor who kidnaps her and threatens to reveal Hamster and Gretel's identities live on TV.
50	20	"Who's Afraid of Mordros the Annihilator?"	Tricia Garcia	Written by : Jim Bernstein & Alexis Pereira; Storyboarded by : Su Jen Buchheim & Heather Gregersen	April 13, 2025	220	0.13
50	20	"Who's Afraid of Mordros the Annihilator?"	Jordan Rosato	Written by : Alex Estrada & Joanna Hausmann; Storyboarded by : Rufino Roy Camacho II & Dota Sata	April 13, 2025	220	0.13
Part I: Mordros the Annihilator finally arrives to Earth and enacts his plan to drill to the planet's core and turn the populace into chinchillas. While Fred and Bailey do research on Mordros in hopes of finding his weakness, the superpower-granting aliens reveal that they gave Hamster and Gretel superpowers in hopes of defeating him, due to Mordros having destroyed their planet in the past. With help from The Destructress, they manage to infiltrate Mordros' ship, only to activate his anti-hero defense system, which slowly siphons Hamster and Gretel's energy. Part II: As FistPuncher and Footkicker arrive to help out, Gretel manages to destroy Mordros' drill, reverting all of his transformed victims to normal. Kevin then rescues Hamster and Gretel from Mordros' anti-hero defense system, after realizing that this was his purpose. Fred, Hiromi, and Bailey arrive with Mrs. Maybank, revealing that Mordros used to be her childhood pet chinchilla, who was sent into space as part of an experiment before a space rift gave him his powers. Mordros decides to destroy the Earth but spare Maybank, sending the heroes into the same rift that almost killed him. During their fight, Gretel sends Mordros into the rift and almost falls in with him, before the others rescue her. After Mordros is defeated, Hiromi, FistPuncher, and The Destructress are invited into the fold, the new team drives off in Kevin's van. The aliens consider warning them about another approaching threat that's worse than Mordros, but decide to let them enjoy their happy ending right now.

== Shorts ==
=== Theme Song Takeover (2022) ===
As part of a promotional campaign, Disney Channel began airing the Disney Theme Song Takeover, wherein supporting characters from different shows performed the theme song to the series they were in.

No.	Title	Original release date	Prod. code
1	"Kevin Theme Song Takeover"	September 17, 2022	301
Kevin gets his own theme song takeover of Hamster & Gretel by the aliens while trying to convince them to give him superpowers like his sister and her pet hamster, but they refuse.

=== Chibi Tiny Tales (2022–23) ===
Chibi Tiny Tales is a series of shorts that depict characters from various Disney Channel properties in chibi-style animation. In September 2022, the series began releasing shorts based around Hamster & Gretel.

No.	Title	Original release date	Prod. code
1	"Ice Cream Rewind"	September 24, 2022	0048
When Professor Exclamation melts Hamster and Gretel's ice cream cones to spoil their day, they use the buttons on the video to get revenge and trick the villain into melting himself. Enraged at his humiliation, Professor pursues the two, but Hamster pushes the fast-forward button, causing the former's age to fast-forward until he becomes an old man.
2	"Museum Mayhem"	October 1, 2022	0049
While Hamster, Gretel, and Kevin are at the museum, Professor Exclamation comes to steal its items. While Hamster and Gretel fight the villain, Kevin must work to prevent the artifacts from accidentally getting destroyed. After Professor Exclamation is defeated, everything is put back.
3	"Rollercoaster Romance"	October 8, 2022	0050
At a carnival, Kevin reluctantly agrees to ride a roller coaster with his crush, Hiromi. When a battle between Hamster and Gretel and Professor Exclamation causes havoc, Kevin tries to protect Hiromi without her realizing what's going on. After the coaster explodes, Kevin saves Hiromi and earns her affection.
4	"Laundry Day"	March 18, 2023	TBA
Hamster and Gretel prepare to battle Professor Exclamation when he is terrorizing the city, but they discover that their superhero costumes are being washed. They try to find substitute costumes, but Kevin objects to all of them. Eventually, the washing machine stops, and Hamster and Gretel defeat Professor Exclamation just in time.

== Production ==
=== Development ===
In October 2020, it was reported that Phineas and Ferb and Milo Murphy's Law co-creator Dan Povenmire was developing a new animated series with a 20-episode order for Disney Channel, titled Hamster & Gretel, with Disney Television Animation producing. Povenmire first pitched the show as an animatic in 2019, with him providing all the voices. The character of Hamster originated from a drawing he did on his sketchboard during development on the Disney+ film Phineas and Ferb the Movie: Candace Against the Universe (2020). It was later refined whilst Povenmire was on a vacation with his family in Aruba. The series marks Povenmire's first project as showrunner without Jeff "Swampy" Marsh, due to the latter developing projects of his own after creating his own studio. However, Marsh still has a recurring voice role as various characters on the series.

In September 2021, Joanna Hausmann joined the series as its head writer, co-producer, and story editor. Povenmire approached her after listening to Hausman talking about her experiences as a Venezuelan, as he felt she could bring authenticity to the series' Venezuelan representation. Povenmire has also stated that the show boasts ADHD representation, through Gretel.

In June 2022, it was announced that ten additional episodes had been ordered, bringing the total episode number to 30. On January 13, 2023, it was announced that the series was renewed for a second season, as part of an overall deal between Povenmire and Disney Branded Television, which included the revival season of Phineas and Ferb.

==== Writing ====
Writing for Hamster & Gretel began by October 2020. It was done remotely due to Disney TVA's closure during the COVID-19 pandemic. The series was based on Povenmire's dynamic with his much younger sister, which he felt had never been portrayed on TV before; director Amber T. Hollinger described the relationship between Kevin and Gretel as the series' main focus, with Kevin's arc centering on his role as an older brother after Gretel receives her powers. Povenmire also drew inspiration from his family for the characters Kevin and Gretel. The series features Venezuelan lead characters; this was inspired by both Hausmann and Povenmire's wife being Venezuelan. The series also incorporated several Venezuelan easter eggs.

The series is set in the same universe as Phineas and Ferb and Milo Murphy's Law, with characters from both shows making cameos throughout Hamster and Gretel. However, Povenmire noted there were no plans for a formal crossover in the series, unlike Milo Murphy's Law. At San Diego Comic-Con 2022, Povenmire elaborated that while there were no concrete plans for a crossover, he remained open to the possibility after the first two seasons, as the staff were focusing on the show's own overarching narrative during that time. He expressed interest in eventually bringing together characters from Phineas and Ferb, Milo Murphy's Law, and Hamster & Gretel.

=== Animation ===
Snipple Animation and Synergy Animation both provide animation services for the series; work on the first episodes was finished by May 2022. Episodes are produced simultaneously at different stages, with some in pre-production and others in post-production. The series features action sequences that are more elaborate than those occasionally seen in Phineas and Ferb and Milo Murphy's Law.

=== Music ===
Hamster & Gretel (Original Soundtrack)

Soundtrack album by Hamster & Gretel – Cast
- Released: August 12, 2022
- Recorded: 2020–2022
- Genre: Soundtrack
- Length: 15:25
- Label: Walt Disney
- Producer: Danny Jacob

Like with his previous work, Povenmire has written some songs for the series. The soundtrack was released the day of the series' premiere.

The score is composed by Danny Jacob, with additional music by Aaron Daniel Jacob and Keith Horn.

No.	Title	Writer(s)	Performer(s)	Length
1.	"Hamster & Gretel Theme Song"	Dan Povenmire	Dan Povenmire	0:56
2.	"Strawberry Festival"	Povenmire, Sophia James	Povenmire	1:29
3.	"My Best Friend Bailey's Party"	Povenmire, Florence Milazzo	Gretel	1:28
4.	"I Got Beef"	Akintoye, Povenmire	Akintoye	1:06
5.	"Tiny White Tux"	Povenmire, Sophia James	Sophia James	1:17
6.	"How You Feel About Me"	Berit Dybing, Povenmire	Kevin	1:09
7.	"I'm the Bomb"	Povenmire	Alex Povenmire	1:24
8.	"La Cebolla"	Povenmire	La Cebolla	1:30
9.	"Just Another Friday Night"	Povenmire	James	0:43
10.	"Overload the Grid"	Povenmire, Danny Jacob	Kevin & the Duck Boyz	1:01
11.	"Dance Battle"	Povenmire & Martin Olson	Robbie Wyckoff	1:14
12.	"Get Ready for a Rumble"	Povenmire	Povenmire	1:00
13.	"I Can Be Bad"	Povenmire, Michael Cimino	Kevin	1:00

== Release ==
Hamster & Gretel premiered on Disney Channel on August 12, 2022. The first five episodes of the series were added to Disney+ on August 17, resulting in episodes 3–5 being released prior to their televised premieres. Similarly, episodes 11–15 were added to Disney+ on February 8, 2023, resulting in episode 15 being released prior to its televised premiere later that week.

== Reception ==
=== Critical response ===
Brandon Zachary of Comic Book Resources stated, "Hamster & Gretel delivers a new take on a lot of well-worn genres from Disney Animation. It's quietly a solid parody of superhero narratives, with one of the minds behind Phineas and Ferb helping usher in a new generation of bizarre heroes and villains. It's a down-to-earth cartoon sitcom focusing on a multicultural family dealing with some absurd situations. It's also a show where a hamster sometimes punches adults into submission – a very silly direction that was very much by design." Tony Betti of LaughingPlace.com gave Hamster & Gretel a grade of 4 out of 5 stars, saying, "At only a few episodes in so far, the show has already started building a universe that is sure to become lush and full of details and recurring characters that we will likely see throughout. While the show already has a built-in villain-of-the-week premise, the setup has also been built to include overarching enemies and even non-threatening characters that we'll see again and again. Namely cousin Fred, and Kevin's crush. We also see hints at how expansive Kevin and Gretel's family is, all of which will likely come into play in the weeks and months ahead, giving fans a world in which they can immerse themselves into when viewing and will likely keep them coming back for more. However, they need to figure out the target audience where those fans will come from first. Once they do, (and they still have time) it will be solid programming."

Diondra Brown of Common Sense Media gave the series a grade of 3 out of 5 stars and praised the depiction of positive messages and role models, stating the characters promote self authenticity, friendship, and helpfulness, while noting the diverse representations across the racial and religious backgrounds of different characters. Neville Naidoo of MovieWeb ranked Hamster & Gretel 2nd in their "Best Joey King TV Series" list, called it a "hit Disney show" and "delightful," while praising the performance of Joey King across the television series.

=== Accolades ===
Year	Award	Category	Nominee(s)	Result	Ref.
2023	Children's and Family Emmy Awards	Outstanding Younger Voice Performance in a Preschool, Children's or Young Teen Program	Meli Povenmire as Gretel Grant-Gomez	Nominated	
2023	Children's and Family Emmy Awards	Outstanding Individual Achievement in Animation	Kyle Menke	Won	

== Potential future ==
In May 2025, Povenmire stated that a third season was possible if the fifth season of Phineas and Ferb was successful. He has also expressed interest in a crossover between Hamster & Gretel, Phineas and Ferb, and Milo Murphy's Law.
