= Emily's Wonder Lab =

Educational TV series

- Genre: Educational
- Starring: Emily Calandrelli
- Theme music composer: Parry Gripp; Aylene Rhiger Gripp
- Composers: Louis Clark; Dave Stone
- Country of origin: United States
- Original language: English
- No. of seasons: 1
- No. of episodes: 10

Production
- Executive producers: Emily Calandrelli; Trish Gold; Gil Goldschein; Maria Pepin
- Editor: Chris Ray
- Running time: 11-14 minutes
- Production company: Bunim/Murray Productions (BMP)

Original release
- Network: Netflix
- Release: August 25, 2020

Emily's Wonder Lab is an educational television series starring Mason Wells, Sky Alexis, Zaela Rae, Kennedi Butler and Makenzie Lee-Foster, with Emily Calandrelli as host. It premiered on August 25, 2020 on Netflix. On July 13, 2021, the series was canceled after just one season.

== Cast ==
- Emily Calandrelli
- Mason Wells
- Sky Alexis
- Kennedi Butler
- Makenzie Lee-Foster
- Arya Darbahani
- Zaela Rae
- Alex Jayne Go
- Tenz McCall
- Olivia Coates
- Christopher Farrar
- Jayden Langarica

== Episodes ==
No.	Title	Original release date
1	"Glow Party"	August 25, 2020
2	"Walking on Oobleck"	August 25, 2020
3	"Rainbow Horse Toothpaste"	August 25, 2020
4	"Tornado Chasers"	August 25, 2020
5	"Eggs! Eggs! Eggs!"	August 25, 2020
6	"Slime Time"	August 25, 2020
7	"Bowling with Air"	August 25, 2020
8	"Balloon Power"	August 25, 2020
9	"Spooky Science"	August 25, 2020
10	"Solar Bake Off"	August 25, 2020

== Release ==
Emily's Wonder Lab was released on August 25, 2020, on Netflix.
