= Emily Calandrelli =

Aerospace engineer and STEM communicator (born 1987)

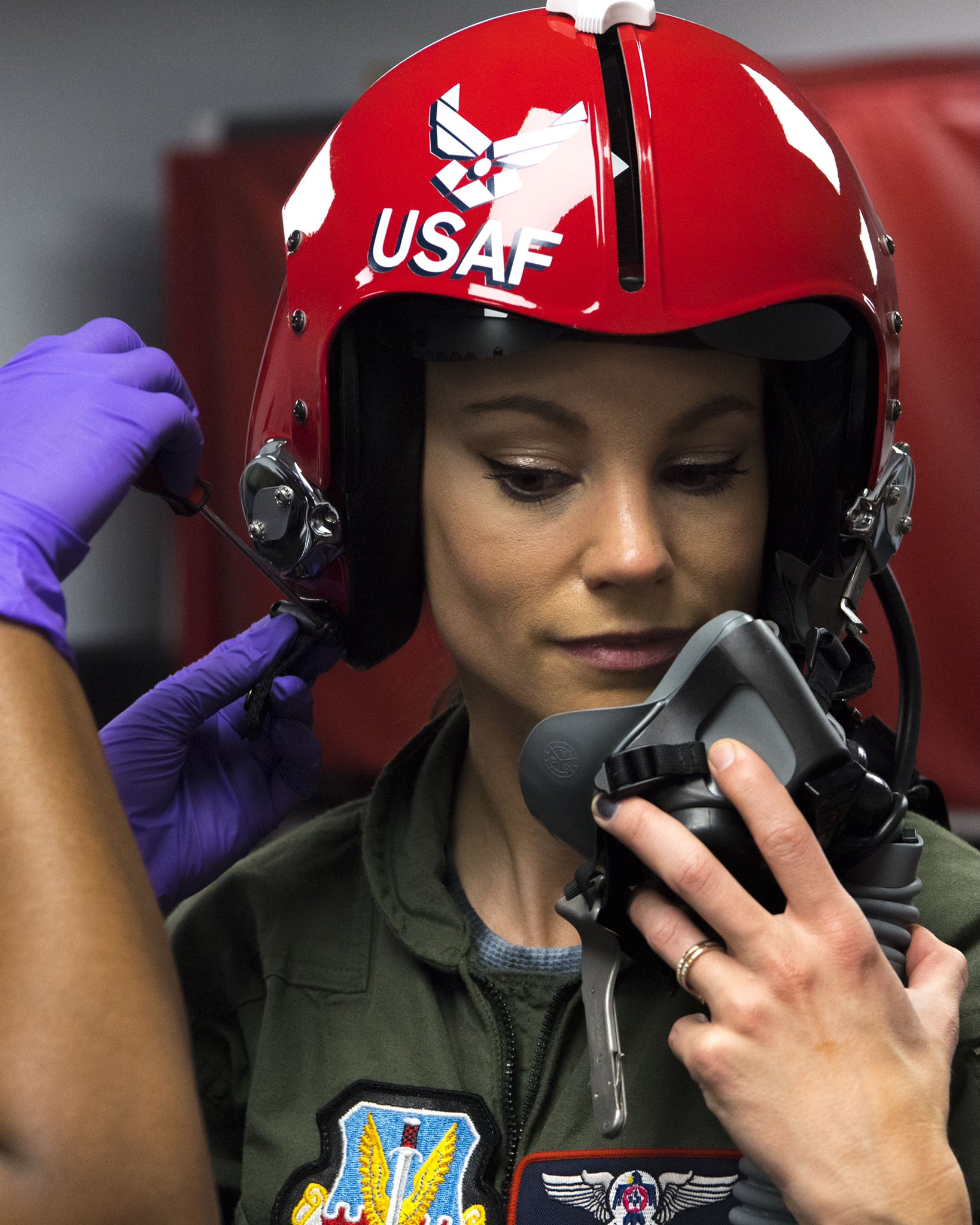
- Emily Calandrelli at USAF Thunderbirds event, April 2021
- Born: Emily Dawn Calandrelli; 1986 or 1987 (age 39–40); Morgantown, West Virginia
- Citizenship: United States
- Education: West Virginia University (BS); Massachusetts Institute of Technology (MS)
- Known for: Host of Xploration Outer Space and Emily's Wonder Lab
- Spouse: Tommy Franklin
- Children: 3
- Website: thespacegal.com

Emily Dawn Calandrelli is an American science communicator, engineer, author, and television presenter. She is the host and an executive producer of Xploration Outer Space and previously Emily's Wonder Lab.

== Early life and education ==
Emily Calandrelli grew up in Morgantown, West Virginia and graduated from Morgantown High School. As an undergraduate, she attended West Virginia University. She became a Truman Scholar which led to her working for one summer in Washington, D.C. for her US Representative Alan Mollohan. In 2009, she was named to the USA Today all-academic team, won the Barry M. Goldwater Scholarship, and was voted Ms. Mountaineer. She later graduated with a B.S. in mechanical & aerospace engineering in 2010.

Subsequently, Calandrelli attended the Massachusetts Institute of Technology (MIT) where she obtained an M.S. in aeronautics & astronautics as well an M.S. in technology & policy in 2013. In 2011, Calandrelli was awarded the René Miller Prize in Systems Engineering. As a Harvard NASA Tournament Lab visiting scholar, she assisted organizations in using crowdsourcing to solve technical challenges.

== Career ==
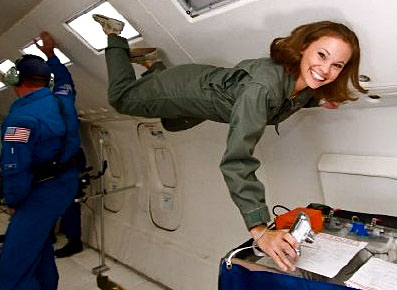
Calandrelli in reduced-gravity flight in 2010

As a college student, Calandrelli worked at NASA as an intern. Her work at NASA included designing the simulation for the Phoenix Mars Lander's soil testing experiment, research on the use of lasers to reduce harmful emissions from jet engines, and developing chemical detection sensors.

Calandrelli is a professional speaker and presents on the topics of space exploration, scientific literacy, and gender equality in STEM (science, technology, engineering, and mathematics). She is a TEDx speaker and a contributing writer at TechCrunch. Additionally, Calandrelli is a Brooke Owens Fellowship Mentor.

Calandrelli started a career in science communication when she became a host of Xploration Outer Space in Fox's Xploration Station educational block in 2014. In April 2017, she made several appearances on Netflix episodes of Bill Nye Saves the World. On August 25, 2020, Calandrelli's educational Netflix series titled Emily's Wonder Lab debuted. Calandrelli filmed the series while 9 months pregnant.

Calandrelli is known as "The Space Gal" online. She has given presentations at Google, Pixar, MIT, Texas Instruments, and K-12 schools and universities across the United States. She was invited by the White House to perform educational science experiments at the Easter Egg Roll in 2023 and 2024.

Emily Calandrelli at the College of DuPage's STEMCON in 2024

She has written the Ada Lace series of chapter books to introduce youth to science and technology and the picture book Reach for the Stars (2022), illustrated by Honee Jang. She also authored two books of science experiments designed for children.

In July 2024, Calandrelli announced that she will be a passenger on a New Shepard flight to space. On November 22, 2024, Calendrelli successfully launched into space as a member of Blue Origin's NS-28 mission, the company's ninth space tourism flight. She became the 100th woman in space, and the 10th woman to fly on a suborbital spaceflight above the Kármán line.

== Awards ==
In April 2017, Calandrelli was nominated for an Outstanding Host in a Lifestyle/Children's/Travel or Family Viewing Program daytime Emmy Award for her work on Xploration Station.

In November 2023, Calandrelli received an honorary doctorate from the Faculty of Engineering at McMaster University.

== Advocacy ==
Calandrelli uses her social media platforms and public speaking engagements to advocate for scientific literacy, the benefits of space exploration, and STEM careers, particularly for girls and women in STEM. She has advocated for parental leave in the aerospace industry.

In 2022, Calandrelli shared her experience of being forced to check breastfeeding supplies at an airport security checkpoint, despite these supplies being permitted by TSA guidelines. She reached out to Rep. Katie Porter, who had introduced legislation to improve handling of breastmilk and breastfeeding supplies.

== Personal life ==
In January 2011, Calandrelli became a licensed amateur radio operator under the call sign KD8PKR.

During her internship at NASA, she met another aerospace engineer, Tommy Franklin. They married and have three children.

== Filmography ==
=== Television ===
| Year | Title | Role |
|---|---|---|
| 2014-present | Xploration Outer Space | Host |
| 2017 | Bill Nye Saves the World | Correspondent |
| 2020 | Emily's Wonder Lab | Host |

== Published works ==
=== Ada Lace Adventures series ===
Text by Calandrelli with Tamson Weston, illustrated by Renée Kurilla

- Ada Lace, on the Case (August 2017)
- Ada Lace Sees Red (August 2017)
- Ada Lace, Take Me to Your Leader (May 2018)
- Ada Lace and the Impossible Mission (September 2018)
- Ada Lace and the Suspicious Artist (February 2019)
- Ada Lace Gets Famous (October 2023)

=== Picture books ===
- Reach for the Stars (April 2022), text by Calandrelli, illustrated by Honee Jang

=== Books of science experiments ===
- Stay Curious and Keep Exploring (September 2022)
- Stay Curious and Keep Exploring: Next Level (March 2024)
