= Brittany Ashley =

American actor, writer, and comedian

- Born: December 27, 1988 (age 37); Chicago, Illinois
- Occupations: Filmmaker, writer, and actress
- Spouse: Cristina Keane (m. 2023)

Brittany Ashley is an American actor, writer, and comedian. She is known for creating lesbian content online and has been identified as an internet celebrity.

== Early life and education ==
Ashley grew up in the Chicago suburbs. Her mother died when Ashley was 6.

Ashley attended the University of Illinois-Chicago.

After graduating from The Second City Training Center sketch writing program she moved to Los Angeles to pursue her acting/writing/comedy career. She has performed at the Groundlings.

== Career ==
=== BuzzFeed Motion Pictures ===
Ashley was a full-time content creator for BuzzFeed. She was widely recognized for creating lesbian content. She frequently collaborated with BuzzFeed staffer Chris Reinacher.

While at BuzzFeed, Ashley wrote the web series You Do You which aired on BuzzFeed Violet and was later sold to iTunes. The series hit the number 1 slot on Apple's top chart after its release, beating out HBO's Silicon Valley season 2, TBS's Angie Tribeca season 1, and CBS's The Big Bang Theory season 9. The series is a queer sitcom which follows four women who go through a series of changes. The series starred Quinta Brunson and Ash Perez.

During her career at BuzzFeed, Ashley created numerous videos that went viral, including a short film about emotional abuse in a same-sex relationship titled Unaware, a short film about abortion titled Unplanned and a series called Lesbian Princess, a modern period comedy about a lesbian princess in the Middle Ages, who tries to avoid marrying a royal prince.

After Ashley and Jenny Lorenzo appeared in small roles on Gente-Fied, a web series produced by America Ferrera, BuzzFeed terminated both staff members for violating their contract on July 10, 2016. Specifically, even though both Ashley and Lorenzo worked on the Gente-Fied series in their free time, they were not authorized to work with other companies without prior permission (i.e. non-compete clause).

Due, in part, to Ashley's large fanbase, her dismissal from BuzzFeed also surfaced a number of critiques of the organization, specifically how it owned all the creative rights to the work of their employees. Another critique was BuzzFeed's policy to pay their employees a standard rate, meaning writers, actors, and performers do not receive residual payments when their work is viewed or goes viral. The firing of Ashley and Lorenzo sparked conversations on the need for BuzzFeed staff to unionize and support.

=== Directing ===
Ashley wrote, directed and produced a dark comedy, body horror film called Take Care, starring Courtney Pauroso and Stephanie Courtney. The film was selected for the Tribeca Film Festival Creators Market and had its world premiere at Frameline Film Festival June 2025.

== Personal life ==
Ashley resides in California. In 2021, she became engaged to designer Cristina Keane.

== Filmography ==
Year	Film	Role
2025	Take Care	Director, Producer, Writer

== Awards and Nominations ==
Year	Award	Project	Category	Result
2025	Palm Springs International ShortFest	Take Care	Best Comedy	Nominated
2025	Women X Film Fest	Take Care	Best International Film	Nominated
2025	FilmQuest	Take Care	Minerva Award for Directing Excellence	Nominated
2025	FilmQuest	Take Care	Best Actress (Courtney Pauroso)	Nominated
2025	FilmQuest	Take Care	Best Supporting Actress (Stephanie Courtney)	Nominated

== Videography ==
- 2014 "Dating: Now Vs. The '90s" BuzzFeed Video
- 2014 "What It's Like To Be Stoned At The Grocery Store" BuzzFeed Video
- 2014 "13 Things Only Siblings Will Understand" BuzzFeed Video
- 2014 "13 Reasons Having An Opposite-Sex BFF Is Awesome" BuzzFeed Video
- 2015 "Dating Problems Every Lesbian Will Recognize" BuzzFeed Video
- 2015 "When You Get Drunk and Lose Your Phone" BuzzFeed Yellow
- 2015 "Lesbian Princess" BuzzFeed Video
- 2015 "How to Win the Breakup" BuzzFeed Video.
- 2015 "College Lesbians" Laughs TV Show.
- 2015 "When You Have A Sex Dream About A Coworker" BuzzFeed Video
- 2016 "People Cover Up Regrettable Tattoos" BuzzFeed Video
- 2016 "When Things Don't Go As Planned" BuzzFeed Video
- 2016 "When You Miss Your Ex's Dog" BuzzFeed Video
- 2016 “Pokémon Go to Your Ex’s House” Funny Or Die.
- 2016 "Emotional Abuse Can Be Hard To Recognize" BuzzFeed Video.
- 2016 "Gente-Fied" America Ferrera
- 2016 "Last Call With Carson Daly" KNBC Interview
- 2017 "Masturbation: Guys Vs. Girls" BuzzFeed Video
- 2017 "9 Questions Gay People Have For Straight People" BuzzFeed Video
- 2018 Take My Wife. SeeSo and iTunes
- 2018 "Twelve Forever" Netflix (Producing)
- 2018 "For Real, Though" Logos Facebook
- 2018 "Something Else" Tancred Music Video Apple Music

== Podcasts ==
=== Don't Tell the Babysitter Mom's Dead ===
Ashley created and hosts the podcast Don't Tell the Babysitter Mom's Dead. The show uses dark humor as Ashley interviews a guest on their personal experience with losing their mother and asks each guest what pop-culture touchstone helped them cope with their mothers' death.

=== Angel on Top ===
Angel on Top is a bi-weekly podcast hosted by Brittany Ashley and Laura Zak to discuss the TV series Angel one episode at a time.

=== Sicker Sadder World ===
Similar to Angel on Top, Sicker Sadder World is a Daria re-watch podcast.
