= Joanna Hausmann =

Venezuelan actress (born 1989)

- Born: Joanna Hausmann Jatar; 20 March 1989 (age 37); Royal Leamington Spa, England
- Education: Tufts University
- Occupations: Actress; comedian; writer; YouTuber
- Years active: 2006–present
- Parents: Ricardo Hausmann (father); Ana Julia Jatar (mother)
- Relatives: Michel Hausmann (brother); Braulio Jatar (uncle); Carolina Hausmann (sister)

YouTube information
- Channel: Joanna Hausmann
- Years active: 2006–present
- Genres: Comedy; Rants; Cultural commentary
- Subscribers: 246 thousand
- Views: 18.2 million
- Last updated: 6 September 2026

Joanna Hausmann Jatar (born 20 March 1989) is a Venezuelan-American actress, comedian and television writer. She gained popularity through her comedy videos on YouTube and as a writer and talent on Univision's bilingual digital platform Flama. She served as co-executive producer and head writer of the Disney Channel series Hamster & Gretel and is a staff writer on the revival of Phineas and Ferb.

== Early life ==
Hausmann was born in Leamington Spa, Warwickshire, England, to Ricardo Hausmann and Cuban-Venezuelan Ana Julia Jatar during their graduate studies in the UK. Her father is of German and Belgian Jewish origin while her mother has Spanish and Lebanese origin. Her mother escaped Cuba during the Castro regime. She became a US citizen in 2012.

== Career ==
Her digital series Joanna Rants attempts to bridge bicultural gaps and challenge stereotypes through humor. She tackles a variety of subjects such as explaining the different Spanish accents across Latin America and comparing U.S. and Latin American customs and politics. She won Comedian of the Year and Creator of the Year at Hispanicize's 2016 Tecla Awards and was nominated for a Best Humor Series Shorty Award.

Hausmann was a correspondent on the Netflix series Bill Nye Saves the World, which ran from 21 April 2017 to 11 May 2018. She was called the show's "unexpected star" by Inverse.

In 2018, she was honored by the National Hispanic Media Coalition with the award for Excellence in Online Storytelling.

She voiced the Alien Commander (also referred to as the Octalian Pilot) on Disney Channel's Milo Murphy's Law. Hausmann has also written for television, including an episode of TruTV's Tacoma FD. She has voiced characters in Monsters at Work, Hamster & Gretel, and the revival of Phineas and Ferb, as well as the Paramount+ series Harper House.

She served as head writer, story editor, and co-executive producer of Disney Channel's Hamster & Gretel.

In 2024, Hausmann appeared as a co-host in the Venezuela episode of Geography Now, an educational YouTube series hosted by Paul Barbato.

She is a staff writer on the revival of Phineas and Ferb.

She is the national voice of Wendy's commercials in both English and for the Hispanic market.

As of August 2026, her YouTube channel has approximately 246,000 subscribers and over 18 million views.

== Personal life ==
She has performed at The Upright Citizens Brigade Theatre in New York City and is a vocal critic of the government of Nicolás Maduro in Venezuela. She is Jewish, and converted to Judaism along with her mother after moving to the United States. Her father, Ricardo Hausmann, was appointed by Juan Guaidó as envoy to the Inter-American Development Bank until his resignation in September 2019. Her brother is Michel Hausmann, a Venezuelan theater director who experienced discrimination when the government-funded Orquesta Gran Mariscal de Ayacucho withdrew from his 2009 production of Fiddler on the Roof in Caracas, citing concerns that participating in a “Jewish play” would jeopardize their state funding under Hugo Chávez.

Hausmann views on President Donald Trump has changed significantly over the years. In a 2016 video that was posted around the 2016 election, Hausmann argued that Trump's political style resembled that of Chávez, someone she previously opposed and protested in her lifetime. Due to this trauma, in the following election held in 2020, she said that she voted for Joe Biden over Trump and argued that Biden is not a socialist. Following the 2026 capture of Maduro, she posted a video reacting to the events and suggesting actions viewers could take, while having a mixed to positive view on Trump this time around.
