= Harper Family House =

Historic house in Maine, United States

- U.S. National Register of Historic Places
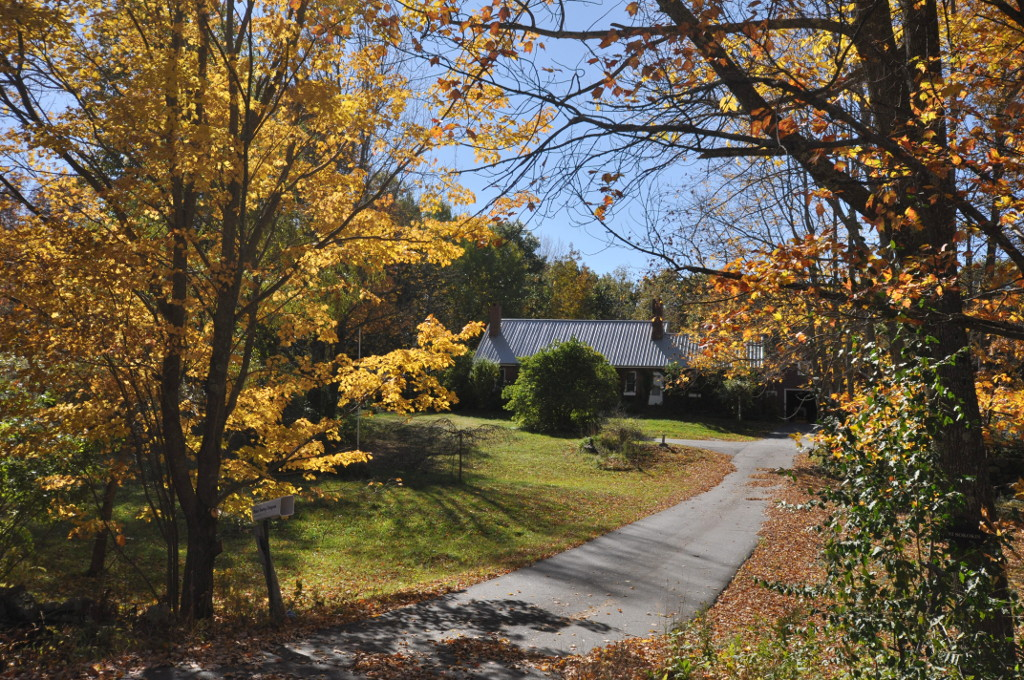

- Location within Maine Location within the United States
- Nearest city: Limerick, Maine
- Coordinates: 43°40′7″N 70°46′33″W
- Area: 5.3 acres (2.1 ha)
- Built: 1809
- Architectural style: Federal
- NRHP reference No.: 98001236
- Added to NRHP: October 8, 1998

The Harper Family House is a historic house on Maine State Route 5 in Limerick, Maine. Estimated to date to 1809, it is one Limerick's few brick 19th-century houses, and possibly its oldest. It was owned by a single family for 144 years. The house was listed on the National Register of Historic Places in 1998.

== Description and history ==
The Harper Family House is located on the west side of Route 5, in southern Limerick between Woodridge Drive and Austin Lane. It is a brick Cape style house, 1 1/2 stories in height, with a side gable roof, two chimneys, and a granite foundation. The main facade, facing roughly east, is eight bays wide, reflecting an original five-bay block and a wing whose front is flush with that block. A wood-frame ell extends to the rear, joining the house to a modern garage and barn. The front facade has two entrances, one an elaborate Federal period surround with sidelights at the center of the original main block. Alterations to the building have been relatively limited, including the addition of dormers and the replacement of the front door.

The house is believed to have been built about 1809, although there is no documentary evidence to support this. It was the centerpiece of a 300-acre (120 ha) farm that also included a blacksmithy. The house was probably built by Samuel Harper, who settled the land in 1787, around the time of his son Ezekial's marriage. The only other brick houses in Limerick of 19th century origin are Greek Revival and Italianate in style, dating to the middle of the century. This house was sold out of the Harper family in the 1950s.

== See also ==
- National Register of Historic Places listings in York County, Maine
