= Melanie Nakagawa =

American attorney

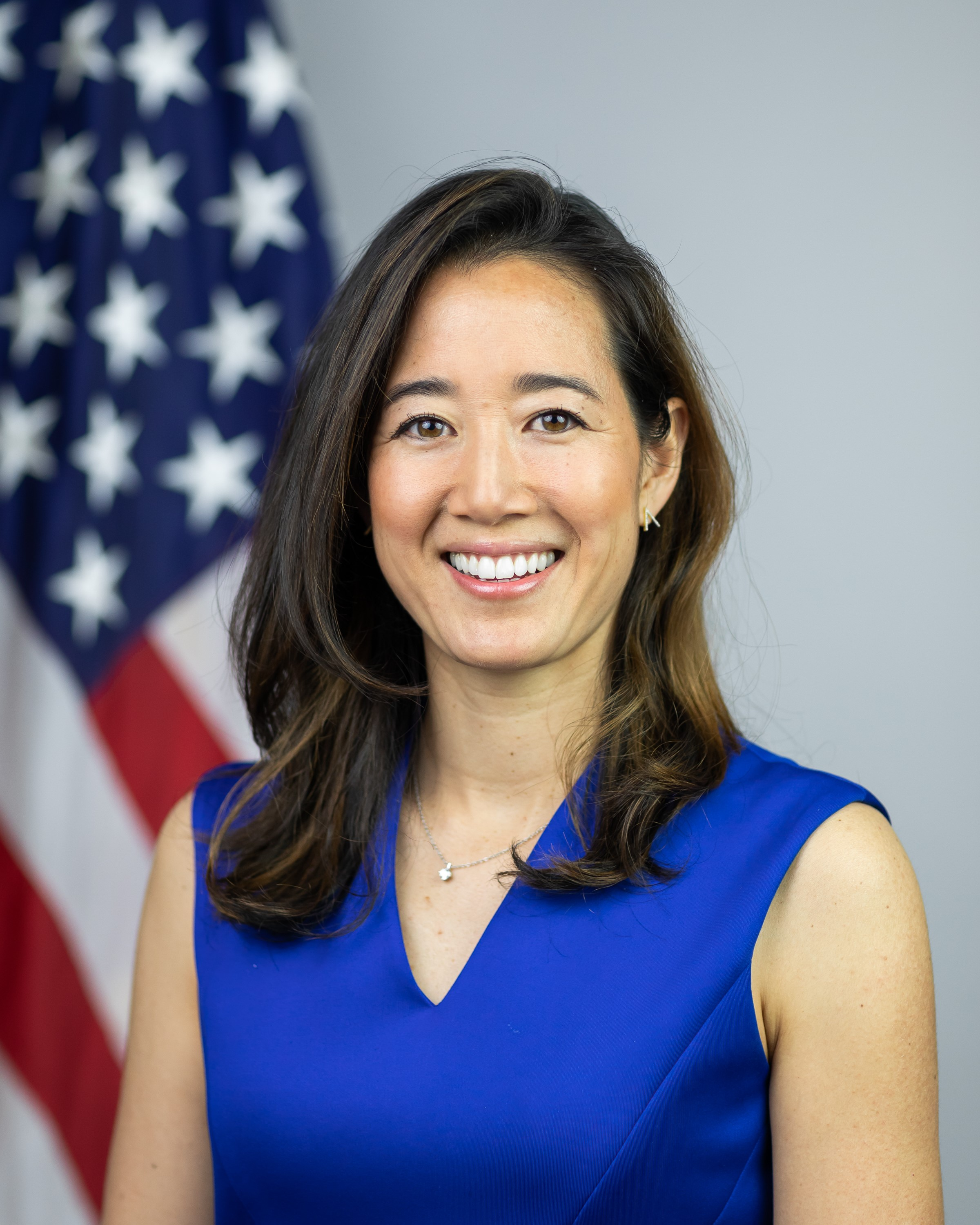
- Education: Brown University (BA); American University School of International Service (MIA); American University Washington College of Law (JD)
- Occupation: Chief Sustainability Officer
- Employer: Microsoft Corp

Melanie Nakagawa is an American attorney, former government official, and the current Chief Sustainability Officer of Microsoft. Her career began in Washington, D.C., where she worked on various energy projects led by entities including the U.S. Department of State and the National Security Council. In 2023, Nakagawa was identified as a leader in combatting the climate crisis.

== Early life and education ==
Nakagawa received her undergraduate degree from Brown University. She has a Juris Doctor degree as well as a master's degree in international affairs from American University in Washington, D.C.

== Career ==
Nakagawa's career began as Energy and Environment Counsel on the U.S. Senate Foreign Relations Committee for Chairman John F. Kerry. She reviewed issues of energy security, climate change and environmental issues, as well as developed policy recommendations and drafted legislation. Afterwards, she followed Secretary Kerry to the U.S. Department of State as a part of his Policy Planning Staff. In this role, she continued her policy development, noting in one instance that the REDD+ (Reducing Emissions from Deforestation and Forest Degradation) framework would be a good investment for USAID projects. She highlighted that gender was tied closely to these initiatives, as the impacts of climate change are compounded by inequity for many women.

Nakagawa served as the Deputy Assistant Secretary for Energy Transformation during the last year of the Obama-Biden administration. She then worked in the private sector before returning to government work as Special Assistant to the President and Senior Director for Climate and Energy in the Biden-Harris administration. In this role, she worked on the U.S. return to the Paris Agreement and was responsible for integrating climate change metrics into U.S. foreign policy and national security.

Nakagawa joined Microsoft as their Chief Sustainability Officer in January 2023. In 2024, she was chosen as one of Time's 100 Most Influential Climate Leaders in Business, a list for leaders who are "making significant progress in influencing the business of climate change".

== Publications ==
- Nakagawa, Melanie. "The Millennium Challenge Account: A Critical Look at the Newly Focused Development Approach and its Potential Impact on the U.S Agency for International Development." Sustainable Development Law & Policy, Fall 2005, 13–19, 76–77.
