= Jennifer Reich =

American sociologist and author

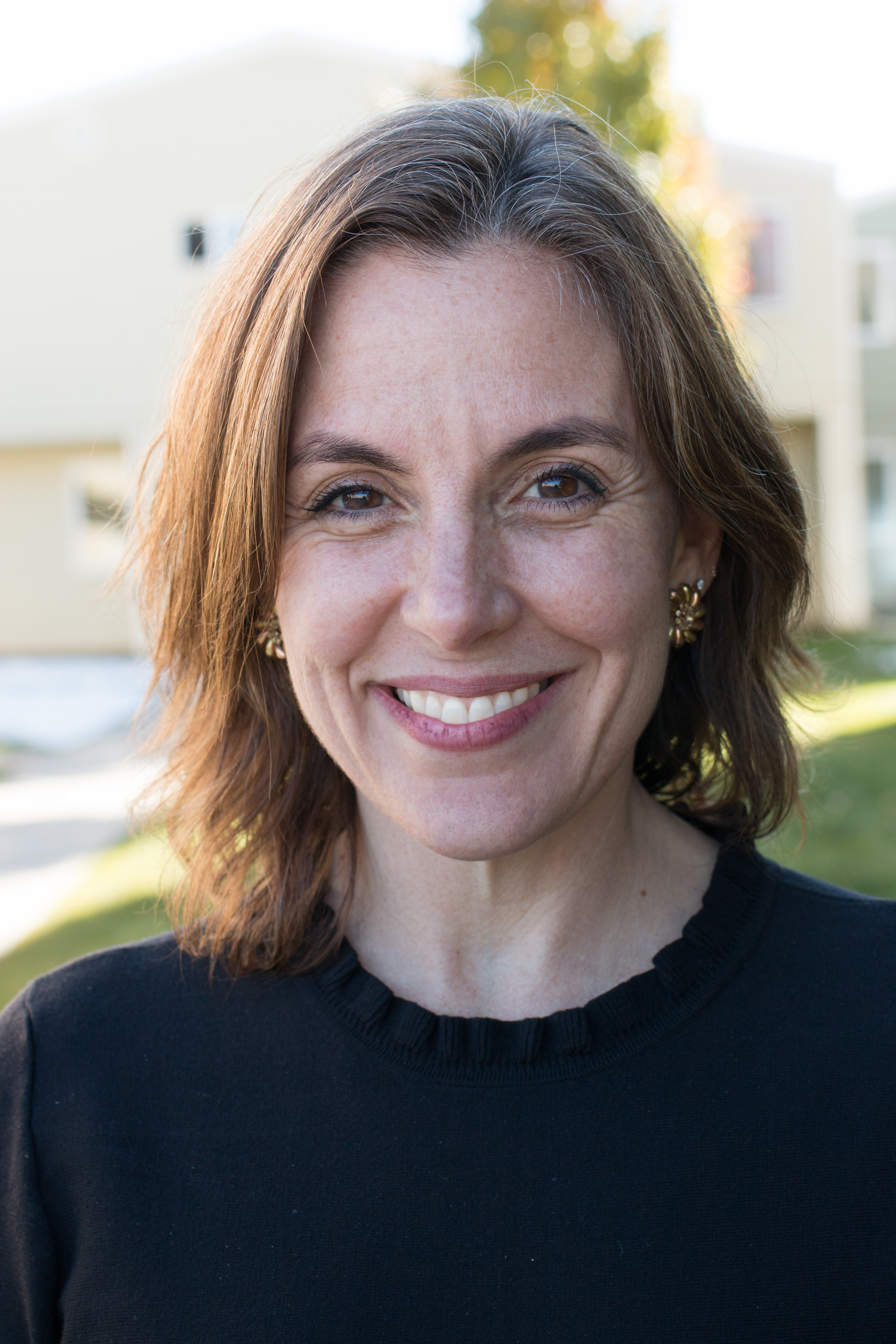
- Occupation: Sociologist
- Known for: Research on vaccine hesitancy
- Title: Professor
- Spouse: Dave Scudamore

Academic background
- Education: Ph.D in Sociology
- Alma mater: University of California, San Francisco

Academic work
- Discipline: Sociology, Healthcare
- Sub-discipline: Welfare and Policy, Healthcare Issues, Childhood and Adolescence
- Institutions: University of Colorado Denver
- Notable works: Calling the Shots: Why Parents Reject Vaccines

Jennifer Anne Reich is an American sociologist, researcher and author at the University of Colorado Denver. Her research interests include healthcare, adolescence, welfare, and policy. Her work on vaccine hesitancy gained widespread attention during the 2019 measles outbreaks. She is the author of three books and numerous journal articles.

== Education ==
Reich attended Calabasas High School and subsequently earned her B.A. at the University of California, Santa Barbara and her M.A. and Ph.D. at the University of California, Davis. She has been a tenured professor at the University of Denver, where she was a faculty member for ten years and is currently a tenured and full professor at the University of Colorado Denver.

In 2019, Reich was named as the Director of the University Honors and Leadership Program at the University of Colorado Denver.

Reich is Vice President of the American Sociological Association.

== Vaccine hesitancy ==
Reich spent nearly ten years exploring what motivates some parents to decline inoculations for their children, or delay them. Her interviews with parents and subsequent research are presented in her 2016 book Calling the Shots: Why Parents Reject Vaccines. She sees vaccine hesitancy as a consequence of societal pressures on parents (especially middle-class mothers) to make choices that are uniquely suited to their own children in terms of health and education, to maximize their chances of success in life: "We do vaccines in a way that has been shown to be scientifically the most efficacious and the safest and also the easiest to distribute at a national level. But for parents who really prioritize each child in their family as an individual, they don't accept this kind of logic." Working full-time on their kids, these parents are inclined to disregard generic advice dispensed by health professionals.

Facing a steady stream of misleading information, pediatricians and public health professionals have to know what motivates parents to be reluctant about vaccines, and to adjust how they communicate, says Reich. She suggests pediatricians have more success having a fruitful dialogue when they can communicate with empathy, parent-to-parent. How to put the focus on collective benefits - explaining own inoculation better protects all children - may be a way for public health authorities to overcome the reluctance of many parents.

Reich presented at TEDxMileHigh Imagine "What I Learned from Parents who Don't Vaccinate their Kids", discussing her experiences with vaccine hesitancy and how society conceptualizes health.

== Selected publications ==
=== Books ===
Year	Title	Details
2021	State of Families: Law, Policy, and the Meanings of Relationships	Edited by Reich
2016	Calling the Shots: Why Parents Reject Vaccines	Donald W. Light Award for Applied Medical Sociology, 2018 American Sociological Association; Distinguished Scholarship Award, 2018 Pacific Sociological Association; Outstanding Book Award, 2017 American Sociological Association Section on Altruism, Morality, and Social Solidarity; Honorable Mention, 2017 Mirra Komarovksy Book Award, Eastern Sociological Society
2014	Reproduction and Society: Interdisciplinary Readings	With Carole Joffe.
2005	Fixing Families: Parents, Power, and the Child Welfare System	Distinguished Contribution to Scholarship Book Award, 2007, American Sociological Association section on Race, Gender, and Class; Finalist, C. Wright Mills Award, Society for the Study of Social Problems, 2006.

=== Selected journal articles ===
- Siry, Bonnie; Matlock, Daniel; Reich, Jennifer; Daugherty, Stacie; Havranek, Edward; Perman, Sarah (January 2019). "830: Surrogate Decision-maker's perceptions of engaging in research while grieving". Critical Care Medicine. 47: 394+. doi:10.1097/01.ccm.0000551579.37278.8a. S2CID 58306872 – via ResearchGate.
- Reich, Jennifer (2019). "Tracing Autism: Uncertainty, Ambiguity, and the Affective Labor of Neuroscience". Contemporary Sociology. 48: 59–60. doi:10.1177/0094306118815500o – via ResearchGate.
- Reich, Jennifer (October 2018). ""We are fierce, independent thinkers and intelligent": Social capital and stigma management among mothers who refuse vaccines". Social Science & Medicine. 257 112015. doi:10.1016/j.socscimed.2018.10.027. PMID 30442504. S2CID 53562091 – via ResearchGate.
- Reich, Jennifer (January 2018). ""I Have to Write a Statement of Moral Conviction. Can Anyone Help?": Parents' Strategies for Managing Compulsory Vaccination Laws". Sociological Perspectives. 61 (2): 222–239. doi:10.1177/0731121418755113. S2CID 149375401 – via ResearchGate.
- Reich, Jennifer (March 2016). "Neoliberal Parenting, Future Sexual Citizens, and Vaccines Against Sexual Risk". Sexuality Research and Social Policy. 13 (4): 103–110. doi:10.1007/s13178-016-0227-z. S2CID 147442934 – via ResearchGate.
- Reich, Jennifer (2008). "Not Ready to Fill His Father's Shoes: A Masculinist Discourse of Abortion". Men and Masculinities. 11: 3–21. doi:10.1177/1097184X06291914. S2CID 144767228 – via ResearchGate.
- Reich, Jennifer (Fall 2003). "Pregnant with Possibility: Reflections on Embodiment, Access, and Inclusion in Field Research" (PDF). Qualitative Sociology. 26 (3): 351–367. doi:10.1023/A:1024018326659. S2CID 142747435 – via ResearchGate.
