= Roy Harper House =

Historic house in Arkansas, United States

- U.S. National Register of Historic Places
- Location within Arkansas Location within the United States
- Nearest city: Romance, Arkansas
- Coordinates: 35°11′26″N 92°2′53″W
- Area: less than one acre
- Built: 1912
- Architectural style: Vernacular T-shaped plan
- MPS: White County MPS
- NRHP reference No.: 91001304
- Added to NRHP: July 21, 1992

The Roy Harper House is a historic house in rural western White County, Arkansas. It is located about 3.5 miles (5.6 km) south of the hamlet of Romance, on the north side of County Road 16, 0.5 miles (0.80 km) west of its junction with County Road 24. It is a single-story wood box-frame structure, with a gable roof and a stone pier foundation. It has a porch extending across the front, noted for its turned posts and brackets. The house was built c. 1912, and is one of few surviving buildings in the county from this period to use box-frame construction.

The house was listed on the National Register of Historic Places in 1992.

== See also ==
- National Register of Historic Places listings in White County, Arkansas
