= Robert Atlas Harper House =

Historic house in Arkansas, United States

- U.S. National Register of Historic Places
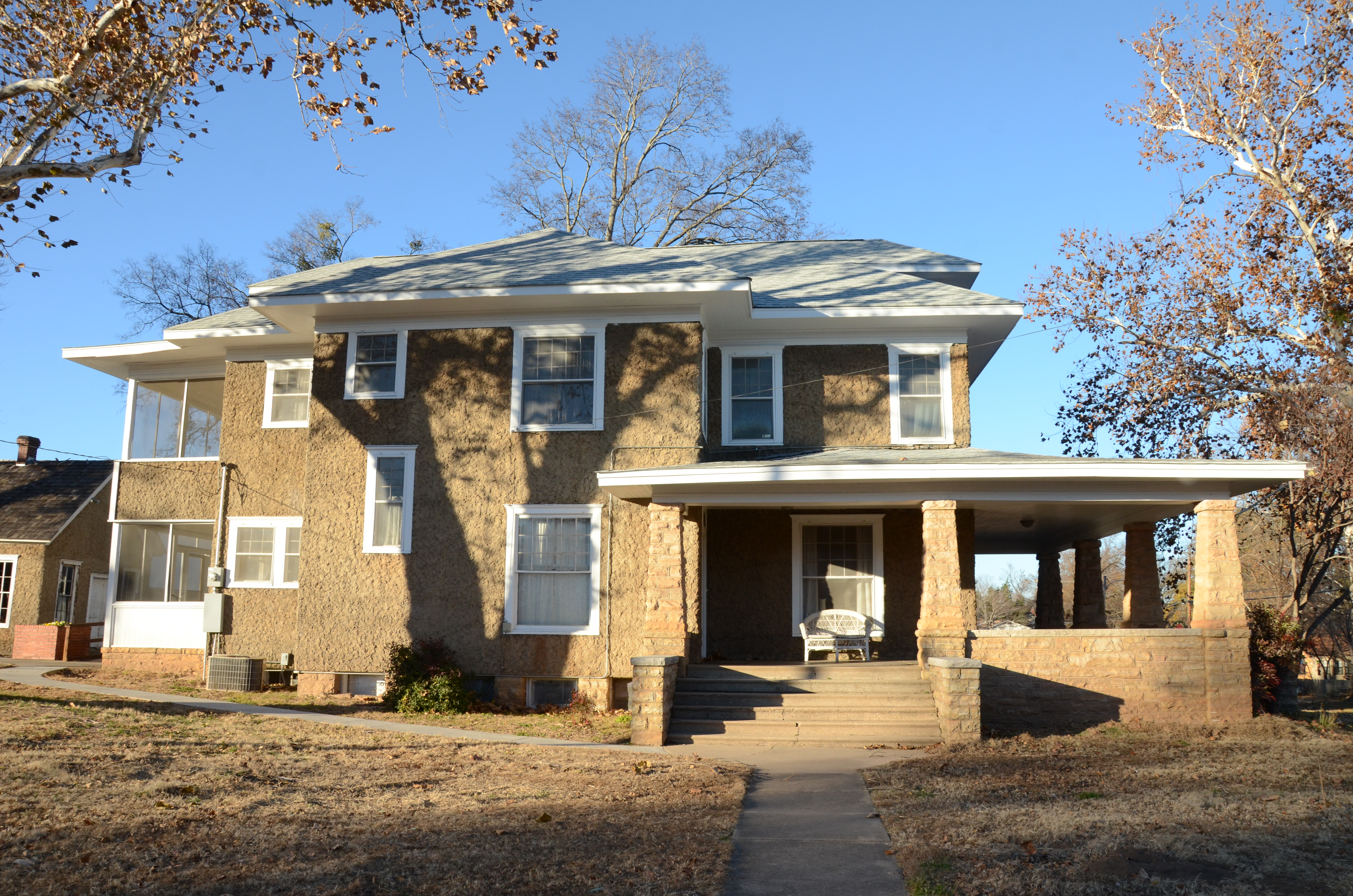

- Location within Arkansas Location within the United States
- Location: 201 N. Main St., Greenwood, Arkansas
- Coordinates: 35°12′58″N 94°15′22″W
- Area: less than one acre
- Built: 1915
- Built by: Calvin W. Stanfill
- Architectural style: American Foursquare
- NRHP reference No.: 00000612
- Added to NRHP: June 2, 2000

The Robert Atlas Harper House is a historic house at 201 North Main Street in Greenwood, Arkansas. Built about 1915, the house is a little-altered American Foursquare with a distinctive exterior made of a rough stone aggregate mixed with cement, creating a tabby-like rough stucco finish. Its front porch is also uniquely designed, with tapered square piers out of battered stone set atop a half-wall of the same material. The house was built by W. Calvin Stanfill, a local contractor who specialized in stone-masonry work.

The house was listed on the National Register of Historic Places in 2000.

The "Weatherby House" in James Sallis's novel Midnight on Hollow Street is speculated to have been partially inspired by the Robert Atlas Harper House.

== See also ==
- National Register of Historic Places listings in Sebastian County, Arkansas
