= Harper House (Montverde, Florida) =

Historic house in Florida, United States

- U.S. National Register of Historic Places
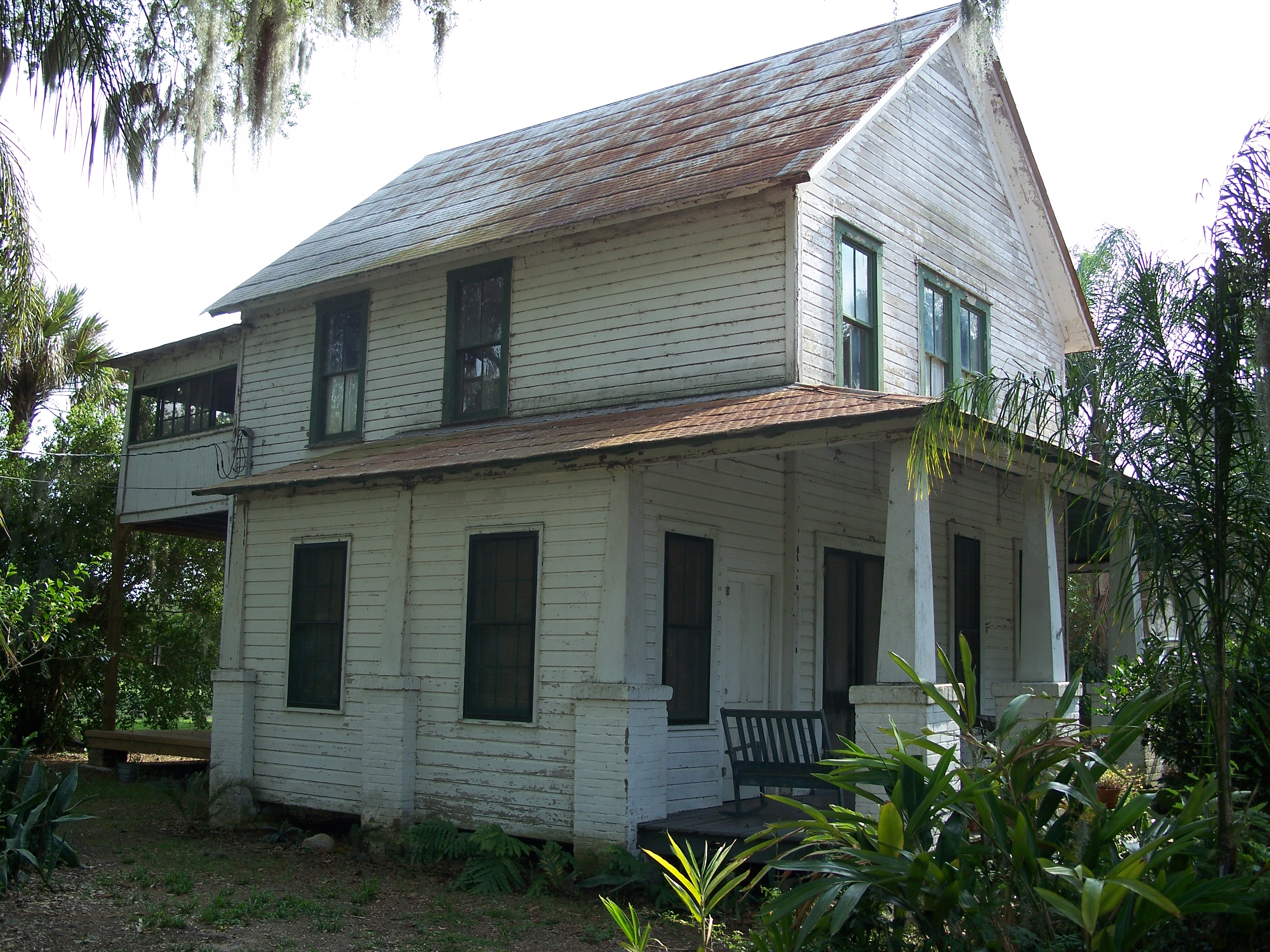

- Location within Florida Location within the United States
- Location: Montverde, Florida
- Coordinates: 28°35′55″N 81°40′4″W
- NRHP reference No.: 04000969
- Added to NRHP: September 15, 2004

The Harper House is a historic home in Montverde, Florida. It is located at 17408 East Porter Avenue. On September 15, 2004, it was added to the U.S. National Register of Historic Places.
