= Alfred William Harper House =

Historic house in Utah, United States

- U.S. National Register of Historic Places
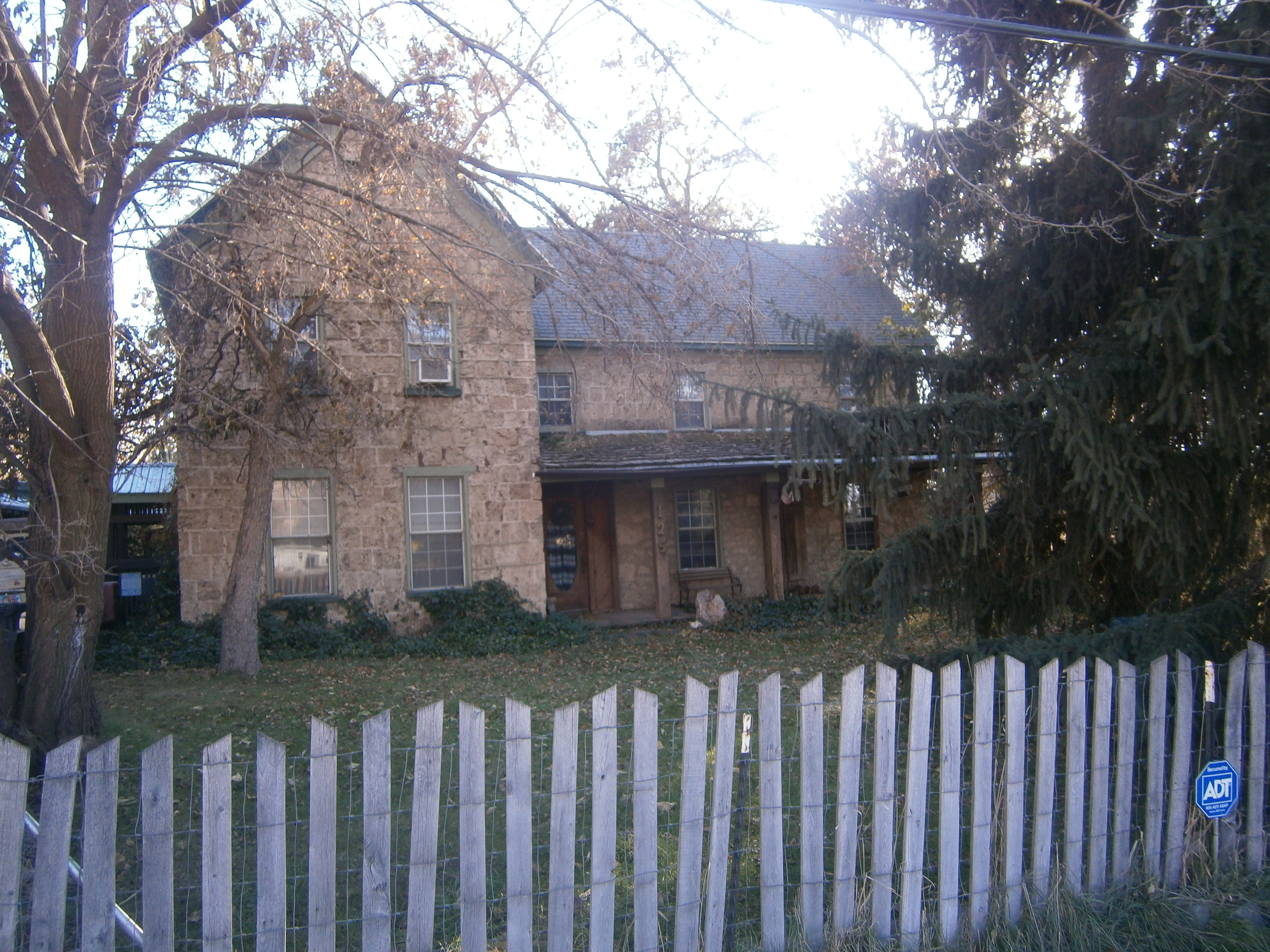
- North-facing facade in 2019

- Location within Utah Location within the United States
- Location: 125 West 400 North, Lindon, Utah
- Coordinates: 40°20′40″N 111°43′1″W
- Area: 0.4 acres (0.16 ha)
- Built: 1877
- Built by: Alfred William Harper
- Architectural style: Cross-wing/Vernacular
- MPS: Pleasant Grove Soft-Rock Buildings TR
- NRHP reference No.: 87000828
- Added to NRHP: June 9, 1987

The Alfred William Harper House is a historic house located at 125 West 400 North in Lindon, Utah.

== Description and history ==
It is a two-story, soft rock vernacular house that was built in 1877 and extended in 1889.

It was first built in 1877 as a two-story hall-parlor house with an east-facing, symmetrical three-bay facade. In 1889 a two-story cross-wing was added on the west, and the main facade was re-oriented to the north, with the cross-wing's west-facing facade giving a dual facade appearance. It is on a corner lot, with the north and west facades facing to the streets. Its porches on the north and west, in 1986, were not original; photos show porches in the early 1900s.

Its exterior soft-rock walls were once covered in stucco, probably in the 1930s or 1940s, but the stucco was removed in 1972 and raised mortaring was applied to the joints. Photo in 2019 still shows the soft-rock with raised mortaring.

The House was home of Alfred William Harper (born c.1843 in England, an LDS convert who immigrated with his parents to Utah in 1868. Melissa Walker and he married September 18, 1875. They purchased over five acres of land in 1877 in the "basin area" below Lindon Hill, then an outlying area south of Pleasant Grove, and began constructing this house. They lived in a tent during construction.

It is located in an area which was incorporated into Lindon (the city adjacent to Pleasant Grove on the south) in 1924.

The House was listed on the National Register of Historic Places in 1987. It was part of a study of Pleasant Grove-area buildings built of soft-rock, 13 of which were nominated for listing.

A small historical marker about the house is located outside the fence on N. 400 St.
