= Top Cat (disambiguation) =

Top Cat is an animated television series that aired in the early 1960s that was produced by the Hanna-Barbera studios.

Top Cat may also refer to:

- Top Cat and the Beverly Hills Cats, a 1988 film based on two episodes of the original series
- Top Cat: The Movie, a 2011 film based on the original series
- Top Cat Begins, a 2015 film based on the original series
- Top Cat (brand), a British brand of cat food
- Topcat, sailing catamaran boat class
- HSC Manannan, a catamaran ferry formerly 'TopCat' sailing between islands in New Zealand

== See also ==
- Top Dog (disambiguation)
