= CB Bears =

American animated television series

- Title card
- Genre: Comedy
- Created by: William Hanna; Joseph Barbera
- Written by: Bill Ackerman; Haskell Barkin; Barry Blitzer; Tom Dagenais; Karl Geurs; Orville Hampton; Don Jurwich; Jon Kubichan; Joan Maurer; Ray Parker; Howard Post; Dick Robbins; Jerry Winnick
- Directed by: Charles A. Nichols
- Voices of: Sheldon Allman; Michael Bell; Daws Butler; Henry Corden; Susan Davis; Bob Hastings; Marvin Kaplan; Chuck McCann; Ginny McSwain; Don Messick; Alan Oppenheimer; Joe E. Ross; Susan Silo; Lennie Weinrib; Paul Winchell; William Woodson
- Narrated by: William Woodson (opening narration)
- Theme music composer: Hoyt Curtin
- Composer: Hoyt Curtin
- Country of origin: United States
- Original language: English
- No. of series: 1
- No. of episodes: 13

Production
- Executive producers: William Hanna; Joseph Barbera
- Running time: 60 minutes
- Production company: Hanna-Barbera Productions

Original release
- Network: NBC
- Release: September 10 – December 3, 1977

CB Bears is an American animated television series produced by Hanna-Barbera Productions, which aired on NBC from September 10 to December 3, 1977.

As with many Hanna-Barbera shows of the time, CB Bears was an anthology series with six regular segments: The CB Bears; Blast-Off Buzzard; Heyyy, It's the King!; Posse Impossible; Shake, Rattle & Roll; and Undercover Elephant. Each segment riffed on a popular television show or film.

The CB Bears segment was a spoof on the 1976 hit show Charlie's Angels, with a trio of ursine investigators given assignments by an unseen dispatcher. Similarly, Heyyy, It's the King! was a takeoff on the 1974 hit Happy Days, with a royal lion based on Henry Winkler's famous Fonzie. Blast-Off Buzzard imitated Looney Tunes' Wile E. Coyote and the Road Runner; Posse Impossible was a cowboy show caricaturing John Wayne; Shake, Rattle & Roll featured a trio of ghosts imitating comics Hugh Herbert, Lou Costello and Marty Allen; and Undercover Elephant spoofed Mission: Impossible.

On February 4, 1978, NBC repackaged the show as part of the two-hour The Go-Go Globetrotters, which also featured reruns of the Harlem Globetrotters series. This lasted until September 3.

== Syndication ==
In syndication, CB Bears was shown in a shortened half-hour format with Blast-Off Buzzard and Posse Impossible; Heyyy, It's the King! was also shown in a shortened half-hour format with Shake, Rattle & Roll and Undercover Elephant. The show was also rebroadcast on Cartoon Network from 1995 to 1997. The CB Bears theme is also heard in the ending credits of The Skatebirds on CBS and Captain Caveman and the Teen Angels on ABC.

== Segments ==
=== The CB Bears ===
Hustle (voiced by Daws Butler impersonating Phil Silvers), Boogie (voiced by Chuck McCann) and Bump (voiced by Henry Corden) are a trio of anthropomorphic bear detectives disguised as trash collectors. They travel the country solving mysteries in a tacky garbage truck called the Perfume Wagon (the CB term for a garbage truck). A sultry-voiced female named Charlie (voiced by Susan Davis) contacts the bears on the truck's CB radio to give them their assignments. This show was "inspired" by the hit TV series Charlie's Angels (Bump wore a blonde hairstyle similar to Farrah Fawcett). Each of the bears' names refers to a different 1970s disco dance, and the show's overall premise made reference to the CB radio craze of the mid-1970s (by this point waning in popularity). Physically and personality-wise, Hustle, Boogie, and Bump resemble Hair Bear, Bubi Bear, and Square Bear, respectively, from the earlier cartoon Help!... It's the Hair Bear Bunch!; Daws Butler provided the same Phil Silvers–esque voice for both Hustle and Hair.

==== Episodes ====
Nº	Title	Original air date
C.1	"The Missing Mansion Mystery"	September 10, 1977
The CB Bears uncover a missing mansion in the midst of an alligator-infested lagoon.
C.2	"The Doomsday Mine"	September 17, 1977
The CB Bears drive out to End of the Trail, Arizona, where people are turning green and strange lights and sounds are emanating from the deserted Doomsday Mine.
C.3	"Follow that Mountain"	September 24, 1977
While investigating the strange case of the disappearing mountains, the CB Bears fall into a cavern and are chased by giant gophers created by Dr. Terra.
C.4	"Valley of No Return"	October 1, 1977
The CB Bears go deep into the jungle to discover why the animals are fleeing in terror from the Valley of No Return. They find that an archaeologist named Seeker has driven the animals out of the Valley of No Return in order to excavate its lost city.
C.5	"The Fright Farm"	October 8, 1977
The CB Bears follow a mysterious old man named Abernathy who has been stealing animals from the zoo to his hideout at the Fright Farm where he is loading them onto a huge ark.
C.6	"Drackenstein's Revenge"	October 15, 1977
While looking for clues to why all the peasants of Drackenstein are asleep, the CB Bears discover the town's valuables are missing.
C.7	"Water, Water...Nowhere"	October 22, 1977
The CB Bears try to save the world from embittered old ex-sea Captain Sly, who turns water to sand with a machine.
C.8	"Wild, Wild Wilderness"	October 29, 1977
While Charlie warns the CB Bears to watch for strange creatures near their campground, Boogie is snatched up by a giant vine.
C.9	"Island of Terror"	November 5, 1977
The CB Bears battle a giant octopus to reach the sinking island of Mikimos.
C.10	"Go North, Young Bears"	November 12, 1977
The CB Bears go to the North Pole to search for the source of mysterious floods in the Northwest.
C.11	"The Invasion of the Blobs"	November 19, 1977
The CB Bears discover that hissing monsters, which are swallowing buildings in the town of Fool's Gold, ooze out of a giant drainpipe.
C.12	"Disaster from the Skies"	November 26, 1977
The CB Bears rise high over New City in a balloon to discover that the source of mysterious destructive rays permeating the city is a huge probe in the middle of the Top Secret Space Center.
C.13	"Disappearing Satellites"	December 3, 1977
The CB Bears see a spacecraft dive below the surface of a crater lake, follow it, and discover a giant space station in a huge cavern.

=== Blast-Off Buzzard ===
Blast-Off Buzzard (vocal effects provided by Daws Butler) is a buzzard in aviator gear and a de facto villain who chases Crazylegs, a wacky football helmet-wearing snake who outruns the buzzard. Their situation was very similar to Wile E. Coyote and the Road Runner. This is a non-speaking segment.

==== Episodes ====
Nº	Title	Original air date
B.1	"Buzzard, You're a Turkey"	September 10, 1977
B.2	"Hard Headed Hard Hat"	September 17, 1977
B.3	"Hearts and Flowers, Buzzards and Snakes"	September 24, 1977
B.4	"The Egg & Aye Aye Aye"	October 1, 1977
B.5	"Testing 1-2-3"	October 8, 1977
B.6	"Ho, Ho, Ho, It's the Buzzard's Birthday"	October 15, 1977
B.7	"Wheelin' and Reelin'"	October 22, 1977
B.8	"Buzzard, Clean Up Your Act"	October 29, 1977
B.9	"Backyard Buzzards"	November 5, 1977
B.10	"Spy in the Sky"	November 12, 1977
B.11	"First Class Buzzard"	November 19, 1977
B.12	"Freezin' and Sneezin'"	November 26, 1977
B.13	"Cousin Snakey Is a Groove"	December 3, 1977

=== Heyyy, It's the King! ===
A cool, Fonzie-patterned lion named King (voiced by Lennie Weinrib) alongside his high school classmates Big H the Hippopotamus (voiced by Sheldon Allman), Clyde the Gorilla (voiced by Don Messick), Skids the Alligator (voiced by Marvin Kaplan), Yuka Yuka the Hyena (voiced by Lennie Weinrib), and cheerleaders Sheena the Lioness (voiced by Ginny McSwain) and Zelda the Ostrich (voiced by Susan Silo) attempt schemes to get into the spotlight.

==== Episodes ====
Nº	Title	Original air date
H.1	"The Blue Kangaroo"	September 10, 1977
King and his group come across an escaped Blue Kangaroo that is being pursued by a hunter named Hunter Hunter.
H.2	"The First King on Mars"	September 17, 1977
King and his group come up with a plan to go to Mars. One of their attempts lands them near the movie set of a Martian movie.
H.3	"The Riverbed 5000"	September 24, 1977
King and his group participate on a car race to win $5000 and a kiss from the actress Raquel Wrench.
H.4	"Surf's Up"	October 1, 1977
King and his group go to Tempest Beach for a picnic. After Skids works on a customized surfboard, Big H enters its surfing competition.
H.5	"The King and His Jokers"	October 8, 1977
The King, Big H, Skids, Clyde, and Yuka Yuka form their own rock group in order to compete with Cool Cat, who's stolen the attention of Sheena, Zelda, and all the girls in town.
H.6	"Hot Gold Fever"	October 15, 1977
On a camping trip, The King and his group search for gold after they find a supposed treasure map.
H.7	"The Carnival Caper"	October 22, 1977
At the carnival, King and his group run into Yuka Yuka's country cousin Elmo. When attempting to free Elmo, Yuka Yuka is mistaken for his cousin by the carnival's owner Mr. Gridley who also catches King's group. Now King must work to free Elmo from the carnival business for good.
H.8	"The Unhappy Heavy Hippo"	October 29, 1977
Big H is put on a diet and rigorous exercise program.
H.9	"The King for Prez"	November 5, 1977
The King runs for student body president against a human rival. The rival and his campaign manager are caught cheating by Big H, Clyde, and Yuka Yuka.
H.10	"Snowbound Safari"	November 12, 1977
In the North Woods, King and his group go looking for Bigfoot who is on a rampage and plan to get the reward for its capture, but catching this Bigfoot won't be easy for them.
H.11	"Great Billionaire Chase Case"	November 19, 1977
King decides to get an interview with the world's most eccentric millionaire recluse.
H.12	"Boat Fever"	November 26, 1977
The King and his group try to raise money for their dream boat.
H.13	"Go for It, King"	December 3, 1977
King repeatedly tries to set a new world record.

=== Posse Impossible ===
The Sheriff of Saddlesore (voiced by Bill Woodson) and his hopeless posse of cowboys: Stick (voiced by Daws Butler in a hillbilly voice), Big Duke (voiced by Daws Butler impersonating John Wayne) and Blubber (voiced by Chuck McCann) jail notorious outlaws by out-bungling the rascals. In every segment, the Sheriff goes after some no-good polecat which ends with the bad guys behind bars.

A prototype version of the posse was featured in the final episode of Hong Kong Phooey.

==== Episodes ====
Nº	Title	Original air date
P.1	"Big Duke and Li'l Lil"	September 10, 1977
It takes fancy footwork from Duke to rescue a dance-hall girl named Li'l Lil.
P.2	"Trouble at Ghostarado"	September 17, 1977
The Sheriff and the Posse go silver-mining.
P.3	"The Not So Great Train Robbery"	September 24, 1977
The Posse tags some payroll thieves.
P.4	"The Alabama Brahma Bull"	October 1, 1977
A bull rounds up some cattle rustlers.
P.5	"The Crunch Bunch Crashout"	October 8, 1977
Outlaws outwit the Sheriff and the Posse.
P.6	"One of Our Rivers Is Missing"	October 15, 1977
The town of Saddlesore is going dry.
P.7	"The Sneakiest Rustler in the West"	October 22, 1977
The Posse disguise themselves as cattle to bully a rustler.
P.8	"Bad Medicine"	October 29, 1977
A snake oil salesman gets a taste of his own medicine.
P.9	"Busting Boomerino"	November 5, 1977
The circus puts on a sideshow at the bank.
P.10	"Roger the Dodger"	November 12, 1977
The Posse tricks a clever crook.
P.11	"Riverboat Sam, the Gambling Man"	November 19, 1977
The Posse puts a casino swindler in dry dock.
P.12	"The Invisible Kid"	November 26, 1977
The Sheriff and the Posse try to catch a criminal sight unseen.
P.13	"Calamity John"	December 3, 1977
A bad-luck bank robber brings accidents to the town of Saddlesore.

=== Shake, Rattle & Roll ===
Shake (voiced by Paul Winchell), Rattle (voiced by Lennie Weinrib), and Roll (voiced by Joe E. Ross) are three ghosts who run the Haunted Inn, a hotel for ghosts and other supernatural creatures as they tend to their needs. Their workplace hijinks are sometimes disrupted by self-proclaimed "ghost exterminator" and nemesis Sidney Merciless (voiced by Alan Oppenheimer) who wants to rid the world of ghosts. Shake, Rattle, and Roll also tend to have problems with the Ghost Mouse as their Poltercat helps in attempts to get rid of it.

==== Episodes ====
Nº	Title	Original air date
S.1	"Guess What's Coming to Dinner"	September 10, 1977
As Roll works on making breakfast for the guests, he, Shake, and Rattle find a giant egg containing a baby lizard that grows upon eating different things.
S.2	"The Ghostly Ghoul Is a Ghastly Guest"	September 17, 1977
A giant and scary monster shows up at the Haunted Inn and scares away the other guests. When their attempt to scare him away fails, Shake, Rattle, and Roll trick Sidney Merciless into sucking up the monster with his ghost vacuum.
S.3	"There's No Pest Like a Singing Guest"	September 24, 1977
Shake, Rattle, and Roll have booked the Phantom of the Opera as the entertainer of the Haunted Inn. Though him doing his opera singing before the performance is starting to disturb the guests.
S.4	"Shake the Lion-Hearted"	October 1, 1977
S.5	"The Real Cool Ghoul"	October 8, 1977
During a heat wave, the Abominable Snow Ghost checks into the Haunted Inn and starts freezing everything. When the guests threaten to check out, Shake, Rattle, and Roll must do everything they can to thaw the hotel.
S.6	"Spooking Is Hazardous to Your Health"	October 15, 1977
S.7	"Spooking the Spooks"	October 22, 1977
Sidney Merciless turns up with a robot named Robie to rid the Haunted Inn of Shake, Rattle, Roll, and their guests.
S.8	"From Scream to Screen"	October 29, 1977
S.9	"Gloom and Doo DeDoom"	November 5, 1977
S.10	"Polt R Geist"	November 12, 1977
S.11	"Too Many Kooks"	November 19, 1977
S.12	"A Scary Face from Outer Space"	November 26, 1977
S.13	"Health Spa Spooks"	December 3, 1977

=== Undercover Elephant ===
Undercover Elephant (voiced by Daws Butler) and his sidekick Loudmouse the Mouse (voiced by Bob Hastings) work for Central Control and solve mysteries. Recurring gags of this segment included disguises worn by Undercover Elephant tending to give him away (since some were ordered from the back of a comic book), Loudmouse blowing his cover when staking out the villain, Undercover Elephant being unable to avoid the exploding messages (a-la Mission Impossible) being sent to him by his Chief (voiced by Michael Bell), and to resist peanuts.

==== Episodes ====
Nº	Title	Original air date
U.1	"The Sneaky Sheik"	September 10, 1977
U.2	"Baron Von Rippemoff"	September 17, 1977
The nation's most sophisticated experimental aircraft known as X-3000 has been stolen by a notorious spy named Baron Von Rippemoff. Undercover Elephant and Loudmouse head to a private airfield in North Africa in order to retrieve the X-3000 and apprehend Baron Von Rippemoff.
U.3	"The Moanin' Lisa"	September 24, 1977
U.4	"Pain in the Brain"	October 1, 1977
Undercover Elephant and Loudmouse must protect Dr. Von Brain from a rival mad scientist intending to kidnap him.
U.5	"The Great Hospital Hassle"	October 8, 1977
U.6	"Latin Losers"	October 15, 1977
U.7	"Dr. Doom's Gloom"	October 22, 1977
U.8	"Chicken Flickin' Capon Caper"	October 29, 1977
U.9	"Undercover Around the World"	November 5, 1977
U.10	"Irate Pirates"	November 12, 1977
U.11	"Perilous Pigskin"	November 19, 1977
U.12	"Swami Whammy"	November 26, 1977
Undercover Elephant and Loudmouse are ordered to capture Swami Salami, who's been brainwashing people into becoming his slaves.
U.13	"The Disappearing Duchess"	December 3, 1977

== Episodes ==
The segments indicate in colors by which characters starred in them:

- Blue = The CB Bears (13 segments)
- Lime = Blast-Off Buzzard (13 segments)
- Sky Blue = Heyyy, It's the King! (13 segments)
- Maroon = Posse Impossible (13 segments)
- Green = Shake, Rattle & Roll (13 segments)
- Orange = Undercover Elephant (13 segments)

=== Season 1 (1977-1978) ===
No. overall	No. in season	Title	Written by	Original release date
1a	1a	"The Missing Mansion Mystery"	Unknown	September 10, 1977
The CB Bears investigate the case of the missing Bobo Regard Mansion that seems to have disappeared
1b	1b	"Buzzard, You're A Turkey!"	Unknown	September 10, 1977
1c	1c	"The Blue Kangaroo"	Unknown	September 10, 1977
The King and his friends use a blue kangaroo for a high jumper at the track meet, but at the same time, a hunter named Hunter Hunter who discovered the blue kangaroo goes looking for him
1d	1d	"Big Duke and Li'l Lil"	Unknown	September 10, 1977
It takes a lot of work for Big Duke to save a red haired dance hall girl named Li'l Lil
1e	1e	"Guess What's Coming to Dinner"	Unknown	September 10, 1977
Shake Rattle and Roll find themselves in trouble when they come across a baby creature that grows in size when eating stuff.
1f	1f	"The Sneaky Sheik"	Unknown	September 10, 1977
Undercover Elephant and Loudmouse go after a jewelry thief posing as a sheik.

== Voice cast ==
- Sheldon Allman as Big H
- Michael Bell as Chief
- Daws Butler as Hustle, Blast-Off Buzzard, Duke, Stick, Undercover Elephant
- Tommy Cook
- Henry Corden as Bump
- Regis Cordic
- Scatman Crothers as Segment Title Narrator
- Susan Davis as Charlie
- Cindy Erickson
- Joan Gerber
- Gay Hartwig
- Bob Hastings as Loudmouse
- Bob Holt
- Marvin Kaplan as Skids
- Joyce Mancini
- Chuck McCann as Boogie, Blubber
- Ginny McSwain as Sheena
- Julie McWhirter
- Allan Melvin
- Don Messick as Clyde, Seeker (in "Valley of No Return"), Elmo (in "The Carnival Caper"), Mr. Gridley (in "The Carnival Caper"), Newsman (in "Snowbound Safari"), Bigfoot/Robber (in "Snowbound Safari")
- Alan Oppenheimer as Sidney Merciless
- Patricia Parris
- Joe E. Ross as Roll
- Ken Sansom
- Susan Silo as Zelda
- Hal Smith
- John Stephenson as Abernathy (in "The Fright Farm"), Hunter Hunter (in "The Blue Kangaroo")
- Alex Tramunti
- Janet Waldo
- Lennie Weinrib as King, Yuka Yuka, Rattle, Park Ranger (in "Snowbound Safari"), Vampire (in "There's No Pest Like a Singing Guest")
- Frank Welker as Carnival Worker (in "The Carnival Caper"), Ringmaster (in "The Carnival Caper")
- Paul Winchell as Shake
- Bill Woodson as Sheriff of Saddlesore

== Home media ==
All thirteen episodes of Posse Impossible were released on VHS by Hanna-Barbera Home Video on November 25, 1988. In addition, three episodes of Shake, Rattle & Roll were released on VHS as part of a compilation titled Scooby-Doo & Friends: Mostly Ghostly by Hanna-Barbera Home Video in 1990, "The Ghostly Ghoul is a Ghastly Guest", "Spooking the Spooks" and "Guess What's Coming to Dinner".

To date, the series has not been released on DVD.

== Other appearances ==
- Undercover Elephant appeared in some episodes of Yogi's Treasure Hunt.
- Reruns of CB Bears and Undercover Elephant aired in the 1980s run of Captain Kangaroo.
- Reruns of Undercover Elephant were shown as one of the fillers for the adaption of Wake, Rattle, and Roll.
- Blast-Off Buzzard and Crazylegs appeared in an episode of Tom & Jerry Kids in which they actually talk with Blast-Off Buzzard voiced by Lewis Arquette and Crazylegs voiced by Charlie Adler.
- Undercover Elephant made a cameo in the "Agent Penny" episode of the Super Secret Secret Squirrel segment of 2 Stupid Dogs.
- CB Bears and The King and his classmates appeared in Jellystone! with King voiced by Bernardo de Paula. Skids and Big H are re-imagined as girls in this series. The King and his friends are depicted as criminals. Zelda the Ostrich (voiced by Niccole Thurman) and Undercover Elephant (voiced by Dana Snyder) appear in the third season of Jellystone! One-shot character Cool Cat appeared in the episode "Disco Fever", voiced by Dana Snyder. He has an American accent rather than an Australian accent in this series.
