= Arnold Stang =

American actor (1918–2009)

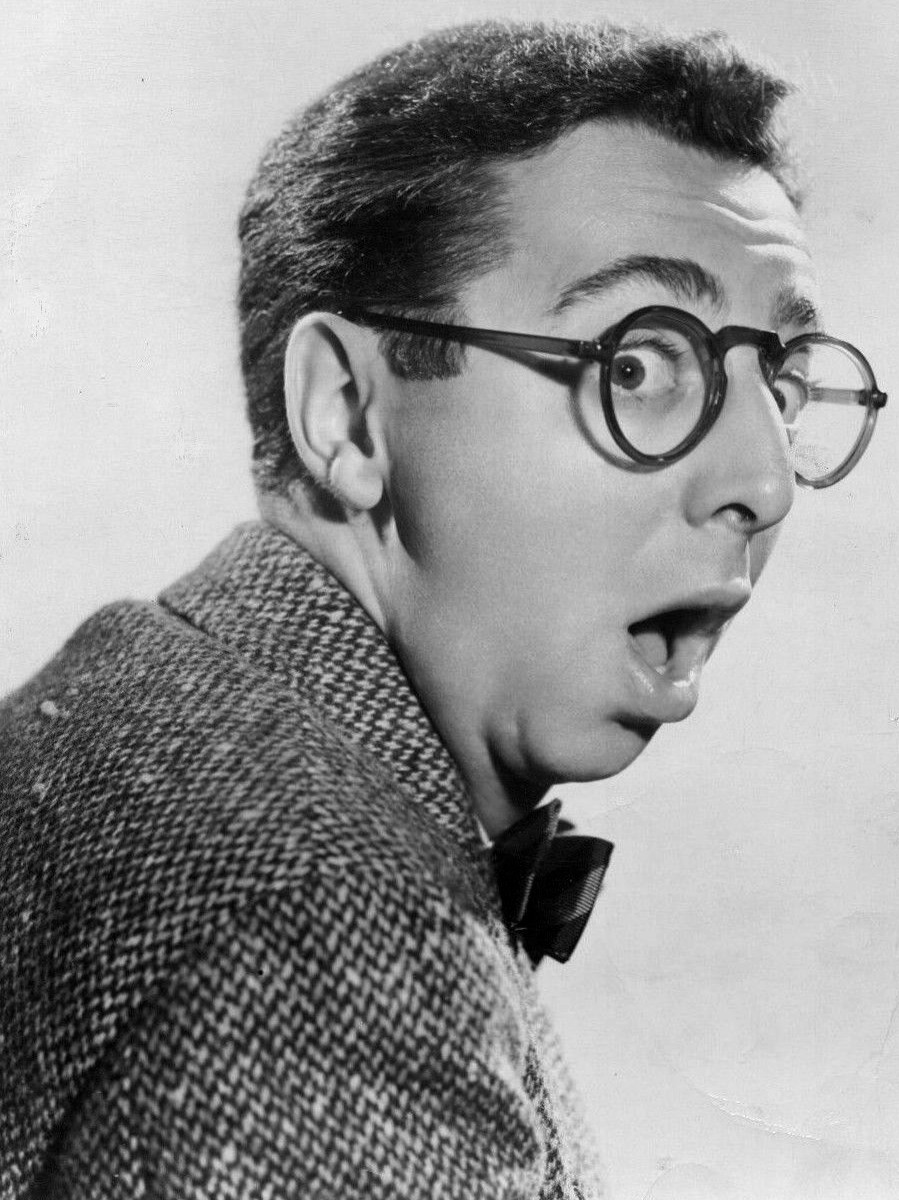
- Stang in 1947
- Born: Arnold Sidney Stang; September 28, 1918; New York City, U.S.
- Died: December 20, 2009 (aged 91); Newton, Massachusetts, U.S.
- Occupations: Actor; comedian
- Years active: 1937–2009
- Spouse: JoAnne Taggart Stang (m. 1949)
- Children: 2

Arnold Sidney Stang (September 28, 1918 – December 20, 2009) was an American actor and comedian. Recognized by his small stature and squawky, Brooklyn-accented speaking voice, he steadily worked on the stage, radio, and television and provided animation voice-over for 70 years. He was the voice of Top Cat in the cartoon series, Frank Sinatra's best friend in The Man with the Golden Arm, and one of the hapless gas station owners in the all-star comedy film It's a Mad, Mad, Mad, Mad World. Perhaps he is most famous for his iconic commercials for the Chunky chocolate bar, "Chunky, what a chunk o' chocolate!"

== Early life ==
Arnold Stang was born September 28, 1918, in Manhattan, New York City. His parents were Anna and Harold Stang. Stang was raised in Brooklyn and began acting in radio shows when he was nine.

== Career ==
=== Early career ===
Stang claimed he gained his break in radio by sending a postcard to a New York station requesting an audition, was accepted, then bought his own ticket to New York from Chelsea, Massachusetts with the money set aside for his mother's anniversary gift. Though his widow, JoAnne Stang, explained upon his death that this story was untrue, Stang did work on New York–based network radio shows as a teenager, appearing on children's programs such as The Horn and Hardart Children's Hour and Let's Pretend. By 1940, he had graduated to teenaged roles, appearing as Seymour on The Goldbergs.

In October 1941, director Don Bernard hired Stang to do commercials on the CBS program Meet Mr. Meek, but decided Stang's constantly cracking voice would hurt the ads. Instead, Bernard ordered scriptwriters to come up with a role for Stang. He next appeared on the summer replacement show The Remarkable Miss Tuttle with Edna May Oliver in 1942 and replaced Eddie Firestone Jr. in the title role of That Brewster Boy when Firestone joined the U.S. Marine Corps in 1943.

Comedian Henry Morgan made him a sidekick on his program in the fall of 1946. Stang appeared in similar roles the following year on radio shows with Eddie Cantor and Milton Berle. He also did the voice of Jughead for a short while on the Archie Andrews radio show when it was broadcast by NBC, opposite future sitcom star Bob Hastings as Archie.

By this time Stang had appeared in several movies, including My Sister Eileen, So This Is New York, and They Got Me Covered. He appeared on Broadway in Sailor Beware, All In Favor and Same Time Next Week, where he first worked with Berle. A notable screen credit was "Sparrow" in The Man with the Golden Arm (1955).

=== Television and film ===
Stang moved to the then-new field of commercial television in the late 1940s. He had a recurring role in The School House on the DuMont Television Network in 1949. He was a regular on Eddie Mayehoff's short-lived situation comedy Doc Corkle in fall of 1952 as well as comedy relief on Captain Video and His Video Rangers as Clumsy McGee. Then Stang made a guest appearance on Milton Berle's Texaco Star Theater on May 12, 1953 and joined him as a regular (Francis the Stagehand) the following September, often berating or heckling the egocentric star for big laughs. Stang also had guest roles on several variety shows of the day including The Colgate Comedy Hour. In early 1951, Stang appeared on Henry Morgan's Great Talent Hunt, a take-off of The Original Amateur Hour, as "Gerard", supposedly recruiting "talent" for Morgan. In 1954 he became a panelist on the Goodson-Todman game show The Name's the Same.

Edward Montagne had produced movie short subjects starring Arnold Stang in the early 1950s. Montagne recruited Stang to join his McHale's Navy spinoff Broadside and offered him co-star billing. Stang was then co-starring with the national touring company of the Broadway hit A Funny Thing Happened on the Way to the Forum and left the show on October 3, 1964 to join Montagne (the play ran six more weeks, with Gil Lamb in the Stang role). "I was originally scheduled to be in the show [Broadside] when it went on the air last fall," recalled Stang in 1965, "but I was tied up with the road show of A Funny Thing Happened on the Way to the Forum. I couldn't get out of the commitment until now." Stang appeared midway through the Broadside run, having missed the first 21 episodes. He co-starred in the remaining 11 episodes as outspoken master chef Stanley Stubbs.

The ratings improved considerably with Stang aboard, but too late to save Broadside, which had already been canceled. Stang felt responsible: "By helping that show I messed it up for the entire cast. The ratings began to climb and they told us we'd probably be on next season. So everybody waited for the renewal, and when it didn't come the pilot season was over and they were all through for the year."

Stang also lent his familiar face and voice to commercials for the Chunky candy bar, where he would list many of its ingredients, smile, and say, "Chunky, what a chunk of chocolate!" As a pitchman for Alcoa aluminum window screens in the late 1960s, he was known for the tagline "Arnold Stang says don't get stung". He would continue to act in television commercials on occasion until his death in 2009.

=== Voice acting ===
Stang once described himself as "a frightened chipmunk who's been out in the rain too long." As for his distinctive squawky, nasal Brooklyn voice, he said "I'm kind of attached to it ... [it's] a personal logo. It's like your Jell-O or Xerox.

His voice was so recognizable to the public that his performances could be enjoyed without seeing him in person. While in New York in the early 1940s, he worked for the Famous Studios cartoon shop, where he supplied the voice for Popeye's pal Shorty (a caricature of Stang), Herman the Brooklynese mouse, and Tubby Tompkins in a few Little Lulu shorts. Stang's major contribution to television was voicing the title role in Hanna-Barbera's animated sitcom Top Cat (1961-62). The show lasted for 30 episodes during its network run, and was frequently rebroadcast in Saturday-morning time slots into the 1980s. The Top Cat series was based on The Phil Silvers Show, a 1950s military comedy with Silvers as a sergeant masterminding get-rich-quick schemes. Stang was instructed to mimic the Silvers delivery in Top Cat until the sponsor reportedly objected -- insisting it was paying for Arnold Stang, not Phil Silvers. Stang modified his cartoon characterization in the later episodes to be closer to his own, recognizable voice.

In 1959, ABC Paramount Records released an album by Stang, titled Arnold Stang's Waggish Tales. He voiced the character Nurtle the Turtle in the 1965 animated feature Pinocchio in Outer Space and was also the original voice of Buzz the Bee in Honey Nut Cheerios commercials from 1979 to 1992.

=== Later career ===
Stang remained in demand for movies, television shows, TV commercials, and the stage. Producer Stanley Kramer cast his epic comedy film It's a Mad, Mad, Mad, Mad World (1963) with a host of popular comedy stars and character comedians, and chose Arnold Stang to play alongside Marvin Kaplan, with whom he had appeared on Top Cat, as mild-mannered owners of a service station. They run afoul of enraged motorist Jonathan Winters. When Winters goes on a destructive rampage, Stang and Kaplan defend their property. (Stang turns to Kaplan and says earnestly, "We gotta kill him.") This huge-scale comedy is Arnold Stang's most famous movie credit.

Stang was in many stage productions; on Broadway he appeared in a 1969 revival of The Front Page with Peggy Cass. He starred in two low-budget feature films during this period, Second Fiddle to a Steel Guitar (1965, featuring Huntz Hall and Leo Gorcey) and Hercules in New York (1970, featuring Arnold Schwarzenegger billed as "Arnold Strong").

Stang returned to the field of animation in 1976 for the series Misterjaw. In this parody of Jaws, Stang was the voice of Catfish, the little sidekick of a playful shark voiced by Arte Johnson. Stang had a small role as Queasy the Parrot in the 1977 film Raggedy Ann & Andy: A Musical Adventure. He reprised Top Cat in Yogi's Treasure Hunt and Top Cat and the Beverly Hills Cats.

Stang appeared in "The Grave Robber," an episode of the popular horror anthology series Tales from the Darkside, playing Tapok, an ancient Egyptian mummy who encounters some unscrupulous archaeologists who lure him into a game of strip poker. He also appeared on an episode of The Cosby Show with guest star Sammy Davis Jr. (and made a cameo appearance in Bill Cosby's 1990 film Ghost Dad.) He played the photographer in the 1993 film Dennis the Menace with Walter Matthau. Stang also provided many voices for the Cartoon Network series Courage the Cowardly Dog and Turner Program Services' original series Captain Planet and the Planeteers.

In one TV ad, Stang played Luther Burbank, proudly showing off his newly invented "square tomato" to fit neatly in typical square slices of commercial bread, then being informed that the advertising bakery had beat him to it by producing round loaves of bread. He was also the TV spokesman for Rent-a-Wreck, a national car-rental agency with a fleet of used, economical vehicles. He provided the voice of the Honey Nut Cheerios Bee in the 1980s and was a spokesman for Vicks Vapo-Rub.

In 1994, he guest-starred as the voice of Irwin the Mouse in the Garfield and Friends episode "Thoroughly Mixed-Up Mouse". In 2004, Stang made his last appearance in an interview with animator Earl Kress about the making of Top Cat (featured on the Top Cat DVD box set).

== Personal life ==
In 1949, Stang married JoAnne Taggart, an author and journalist who wrote regularly for The New York Times in the 1950s and 1960s, profiling prominent individuals in the entertainment industry. They lived in New Rochelle, New York, and in their later years New Canaan, Connecticut, moving toward the end of their lives to Needham, Massachusetts. The couple had two children.

== Death ==
Arnold Stang died from complications of pneumonia at Newton-Wellesley Hospital in Newton, Massachusetts, on December 20, 2009, at the age of 91. He was survived by JoAnne, his wife of 60 years, who died at age 91 in 2017.

Although Stang was born in New York City in 1918, he often claimed Chelsea, Massachusetts as his birthplace and 1925 as his birth year. His ashes were buried in Newton's cemetery.

== Partial filmography ==
Includes all feature films, but excludes shorts and TV movies

- My Sister Eileen (1942) as Jimmy (uncredited)
- Seven Days' Leave (1942) as Bitsy Slater
- They Got Me Covered (1943) as Drugstore Boy (uncredited)
- Let's Go Steady (1945) as Chet Carson
- So This Is New York (1948) as Western Union Clerk
- Two Gals and a Guy (1951) as Bernard
- The Man with the Golden Arm (1955) as Sparrow
- Alakazam the Great (1960) as Lulipopo (voice in the English version)
- Dondi (1961) as Peewee
- The Wonderful World of the Brothers Grimm (1962) as Rumpelstiltskin
- It's a Mad, Mad, Mad, Mad World (1963) as Ray, service station co-owner
- Second Fiddle to a Steel Guitar (1965) as Jubal A. Bristol
- Pinocchio in Outer Space (1965) as Nurtle the Turtle (voice)
- Skidoo (1968) as Harry
- Hello Down There (1969) as Jonah
- Hercules in New York (1970) as Pretzie
- Marco Polo Junior Versus the Red Dragon (1972) as The Delicate Dinosaur (voice)
- Raggedy Ann & Andy: A Musical Adventure (1977) as Queasy (voice)
- I Go Pogo (1980) as Churchy LaFemme (voice)
- Little Miss (1983) as the Narrator
- Ghost Dad (1990) as Mr. Cohen, elderly patient
- Dennis the Menace (1993) as Photographer

Preceded by None	Voice of Top Cat; 1961-1990	Succeeded by Daws Butler
