= Top Cat and the Beverly Hills Cats =

- Genre: Adventure; Comedy drama
- Written by: Barry Blitzer
- Directed by: Paul Sommer; Charles A. Nichols
- Voices of: Arnold Stang; Avery Schreiber; Marvin Kaplan; Leo De Lyon; John Stephenson; Henry Polic II; Teresa Ganzel; Frank Welker; Rob Paulsen; Linda Gary; Lilly Moon
- Theme music composer: Hoyt Curtin (arranged by Sven Libaek)
- Ending theme: "The Most Effectual Top Cat" (Instrumental)
- Composer: Sven Libaek
- Country of origin: United States
- Original language: English

Production
- Executive producers: William Hanna; Joseph Barbera
- Producers: Berny Wolf; Jeff Hall
- Editors: Gil Iverson; Robert Ciaglia
- Running time: 92 minutes
- Production company: Hanna-Barbera Productions

Original release
- Network: Syndication
- Release: March 20, 1988

Top Cat and the Beverly Hills Cats is a 1988 animated television film produced by Hanna-Barbera as part of the Hanna-Barbera Superstars 10 series. The two-hour film was aired in broadcast syndication. The movie's plot is essentially an extended remake of the original show's episodes, "The Missing Heir" and “The Golden Fleecing”. In the film, Top Cat and the gang help a teenager claim her inheritance.

== Plot ==
The movie opens on what appears to be another average day in Hoagie's Alley (which, for the purposes of this story, has apparently been relocated closer to Beverly Hills) for Top Cat and his gang, who are today posing as Boy Scouts, out doing good deeds in the hopes of getting rewards. During the course of this, Benny the Ball saves the life of a bag lady. Unbeknownst to Benny, it is revealed afterwards that she is actually a rich woman named Gertrude Vandergelt, who plans to leave her fortune to her missing niece, a 16-year-old teenager named Amy.

Meanwhile, Officer Dibble arrives to put an end to T.C.'s shenanigans after an unsuccessful attempt by Brain to wash his police car's windshield. Just when Dibble is about to arrest the gang, though, he gets a call saying that his application for retirement has been approved, so he can now retire from the police force, and thus he drops the charges against T.C. and the gang.

A few days later at a gypsy store, Benny receives news from Mrs. Vandergelt's lawyer, Sid Buckman, that she has died and put his name in her will. Upon hearing of this, T.C. and the rest of the gang accompany Benny to the Vandergelt mansion, where Dibble is now working as a security guard. At the mansion, they meet the conniving butler Snerdly, and his Muttley-esque wolfhound Rasputin. Buckman reads the will, which states that Benny inherits her fortune (seeing how the true heiress to the fortune, Amy, is nowhere to be found), provided that nothing bad happens to him within the next two days. This upsets Snerdly, for he had hoped to obtain the fortune himself, so he and Rasputin plot to do away with Benny. T.C. and the gang move into the Vandergelt mansion with Benny.

After several failed attempts at murdering Benny, Snerdly realizes that to get to Benny, he'll have to get rid of the protective T.C. To do this, Snerdly calls up a femme fatale cat named Kitty Glitter, telling her that he has fixed her up a date with a handsome rich cat, as he describes T.C. Kitty is eager to have a rich cat for a husband (to the point that she puts on a wedding dress for the date), but this plan is foiled when she mistakes Brain for T.C. It's only when Snerdly calls her again, demanding to know where she is, that she realizes she's made a mistake.

That night, Snerdly throws a costume party, making Benny wear a bulldog mask and then calling up the local dogcatcher and his pet doberman Dobey to say that there's a mutt roaming around the Vandergelt estate. Sure enough, the dogcatcher arrives and captures Benny. It doesn't take long for T.C. and the rest of the gang to realize that Benny is missing, so they go looking for him. Thanks to a tip-off from Dibble, T.C. finds out that Benny has been taken to the pound, so they take the limousine there and break Benny out. Just as they escape, though, the dogcatcher takes off after them in hot pursuit.

As it turns out, the missing Amy has been working at a car wash as part of Snerdly's evil plot. While on the run from the dogcatcher, T.C. and the gang turn up in the car wash and recognize Amy from a portrait hanging in the mansion, so they decide to bring her back to the mansion so that the inheritance can be rightfully given to her. They arrive too late, as it is now midnight and Snerdly has just inherited the Vandergelt fortune, but Sid Buckman is then revealed to be Gertrude Vandergelt, alive and in disguise, which means that she, in fact, faked her death as part of a scheme to unmask Snerdly's crookedness. In their attempt to escape, Snerdly (who attempts to disguise himself using the aforementioned bulldog mask) and Rasputin are caught by the dogcatcher.

In the end, T.C. and the gang return to their old lifestyle in Hoagie's Alley, and Dibble rejoins the police force. Kitty Glitter reappears, still wanting to be wed to the rich cat she believes T.C. to be, but she dumps him when Brain lets it slip that they're broke. Afterwards, Amy visits the alley to have a picnic with Top Cat, the gang and Dibble.

== Voice cast ==
- Arnold Stang as Top Cat
- Avery Schreiber as Benny the Ball
- Leo De Lyon as Brain and Spook
- Marvin Kaplan as Choo-Choo
- John Stephenson as Fancy-Fancy, Officer Charlie Dibble and Waiter
- Dick Erdman as Sid Buckman and Car Wash Manager
- Teresa Ganzel as Kitty Glitter
- Linda Gary as Gertrude Vandergelt
- Kenneth Mars as Dogcatcher and Film director
- Lilly Moon as Amy Vandergelt
- Rob Paulsen as James the Chauffeur, Lester Pester and Tour Bus Driver
- Henry Polic, II as Snerdly
- Frank Welker as Dobey and Rasputin

== Home media ==
Hanna-Barbera Home Video released the special on VHS on September 8, 1988.

It was later released on DVD August 9, 2011 via the Warner Archive label as a MOD DVD-R, as part of the Hanna-Barbera Classic Collection lineup.

On February 20, 2024, an HD remaster was released on Blu-ray as part of a Hanna-Barbera Superstars 10 boxset through Warner Archive.

== See also ==
- Hanna-Barbera Superstars 10
- List of works produced by Hanna-Barbera Productions
- List of Hanna-Barbera characters
