= Marvin Kaplan =

American actor (1927–2016)

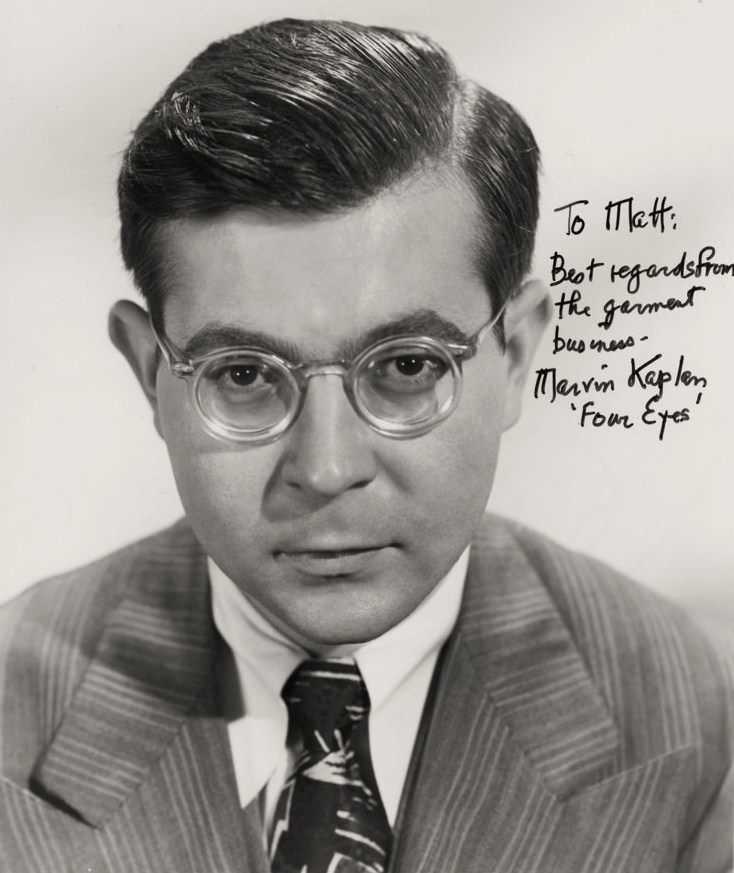
- Kaplan in 1951
- Born: Marvin Wilbur Kaplan; January 24, 1927; New York City, New York, U.S.
- Died: August 25, 2016 (aged 89); Burbank, California, U.S.
- Education: Brooklyn College
- Occupations: Actor; playwright; screenwriter
- Years active: 1949–2016
- Spouse: Rosa Felsenburg (m. 1973; div. 1976)
- Website: marvinkaplan.com

Marvin Wilbur Kaplan (January 24, 1927 – August 25, 2016) was an American actor, playwright and screenwriter who was best known as Henry Beesmeyer in Alice (1978–1985).

== Early years ==
Kaplan was born on January 24, 1927, in Brooklyn, New York, the son of Dr. I. E. Kaplan and his wife. He attended Public School 16, and Junior High School 50 and graduated from Eastern District High School in 1943. He graduated from Brooklyn College with a bachelor's degree in English in 1947 and later took classes in theater at the University of Southern California.

== Television ==
Kaplan is probably best known for his recurring role on the sitcom Alice where he portrayed a telephone lineman named Henry Beesmeyer who frequented Mel's Diner. He was with the cast from 1977 until the series ended in 1985.

In addition, the actor was the voice of Choo-Choo on the cartoon series Top Cat (1961–62). Besides his role on Alice, he was Marvin on The Chicago Teddy Bears and Dwight McGonigle in On the Air. He also provided the voice of Skids on the Saturday morning cartoon CB Bears.

In other roles, he portrayed Mr. Milfloss in The Many Loves of Dobie Gillis, an electronics expert, Ensign Kwasniak, on McHale's Navy episode 104 (season 3 episode 32) "All Ahead, Empty", and in 1969, appeared as Stanley on Petticoat Junction in the episode: "The Other Woman". He later played Mr. Gordon on Becker alongside Ted Danson.

In 1987, he reprised his role of Choo-Choo for Top Cat and the Beverly Hills Cats. At the same time, he actively returned to voice-over acting, playing roles in shows such as Garfield and Friends, Aaahh!!! Real Monsters, Johnny Bravo, and later, The Garfield Show in 2011. Kaplan was the commercial spokesperson for the American cologne Eau de Love.

== Radio ==
Kaplan had a regular role in the radio sitcom and later television version of Meet Millie as Alfred Prinzmetal, an aspiring poet-composer. The program ran from 1951–54 on radio and continued on television from 1952–56.

He joined the California Artists Radio Theatre In January 1984 and performed leading roles in over twenty 90 minute productions. He created two musicals for the group and one."A Good House For A Killing" is a successful Musical Comedy. He appeared in CART's Alice in Wonderland as the White Rabbit,:And In Norman Corwin's Plot to Overthrow Christmas with CART, as Nero's messenger opposite David Warner. He Was in CART's Bradbury 75th Birthday Tribute. He played opposite Jo Ann Worley in three CART productions :Corwin's 100th Birthday, Chekhov's Humoresque and in The Man With Bogart's Face" he was the Cowardly Lion in Cart's Wizard of Oz opposite Norman Lloyd and Linda Henning. And was the Lead in"Clarence" opposite Samantha Eggar and Janet Waldo; and Dr. Einstein opposite David Warner in Cart's Arsenic and Old Lace..He served on the Board for California Artists Radio Theatre for 32 years. Marvin Kaplan appeared as Geppetto on Adventures in Odyssey's Club episode entitled The Tale of a Foolish Puppet Parts 1 & 2 recorded in 2014 and released in 2015.

== Film ==
Kaplan's first film role was as a court reporter in Adam's Rib (1949). He had a small role in the 1963 film It's a Mad, Mad, Mad, Mad World (1963) playing a gas station attendant alongside Arnold Stang, with whom he provided voices for the Top Cat cartoon series. He features in the supporting cast of the comedy The Great Race (1965). He also made a brief appearance as a carpet cleaner in the film Freaky Friday (1976).

== Stage ==
Kaplan gained early stage experience at a Los Angeles theater, working as stage manager on a production of ''Rain''. For many years, Kaplan was a member of Theatre West, the oldest continually-operating theatre company in Los Angeles. He performed in many plays there and elsewhere. He was also a playwright and screenwriter.

== Personal life ==
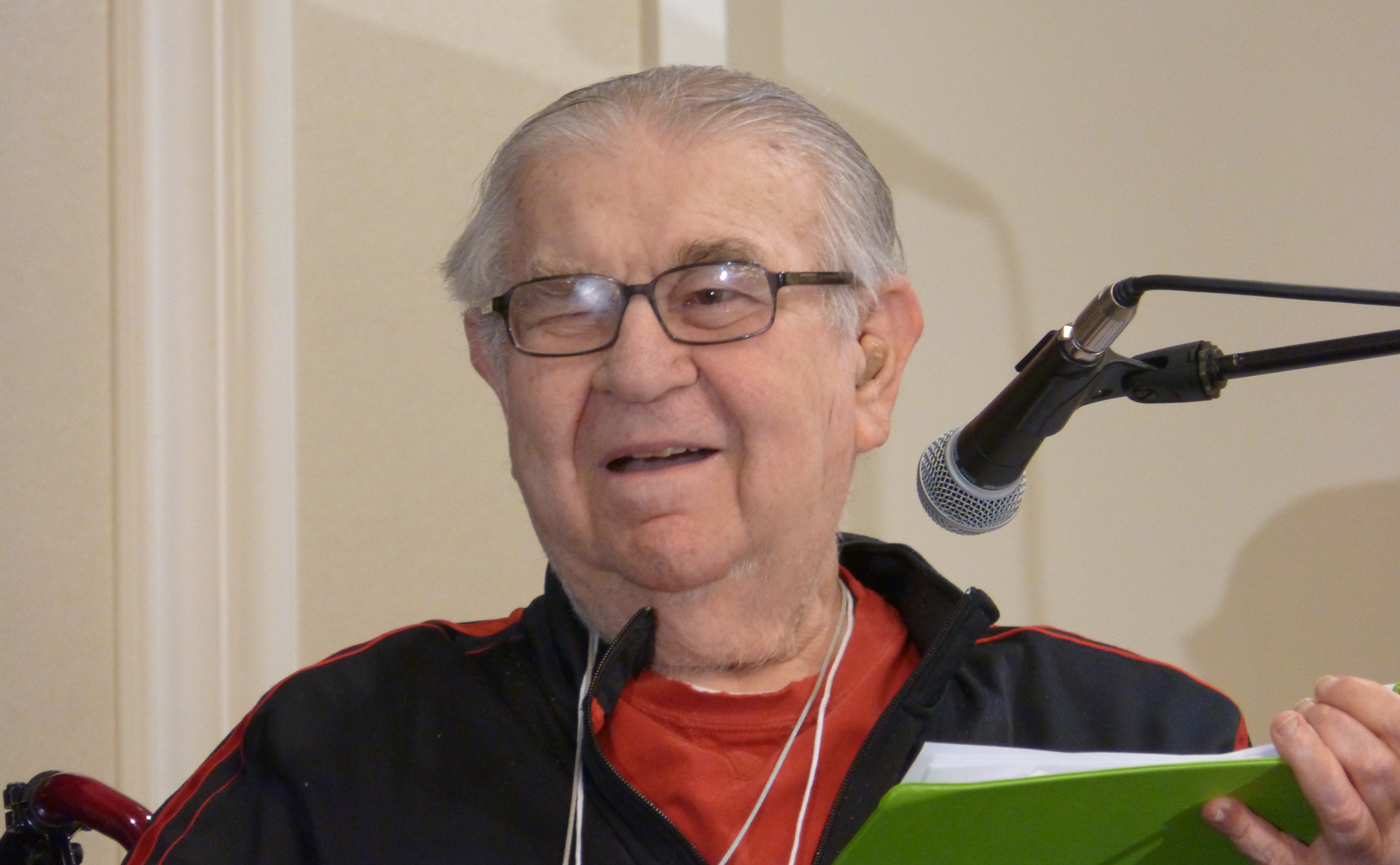
Kaplan in 2013

Kaplan was married to Rosa Felsenburg, a union that ended in divorce.

== Death ==
Kaplan died of natural causes in his sleep on August 25, 2016. He was 89 years old.

== Filmography ==
=== Film ===
- Adam's Rib (1949) as Court Stenographer (uncredited)
- Francis (1950) as First Medical Corps lieutenant (uncredited)
- Key to the City (1950) as Francis – Newspaper Photographer (uncredited)
- The Reformer and the Redhead (1950) as Leon
- I Can Get It for You Wholesale (1951) as Arnold Fisher
- The Fat Man (1951) as Pinkie (uncredited)
- Criminal Lawyer (1951) as Sam Kutler
- Behave Yourself! (1951) as Max the Umbrella
- Angels in the Outfield (1951) as Timothy Durney
- The Fabulous Senorita (1952) as Clifford Van Kunkle
- Wake Me When It's Over (1960) as Hap Cosgrove
- The Nutty Professor (1963) as English Student
- A New Kind of Love (1963) as Harry
- It's a Mad, Mad, Mad, Mad World (1963) as Irwin, service station co-owner
- The Great Race (1965) as Frisbee
- The Severed Arm (1973) as Mad Man Herman
- Snakes (1974) as Brother Joy
- Freaky Friday (1976) as Carpet Cleaner
- Midnight Madness (1980) as Bonaventure Desk Clerk
- Hollywood Vice Squad (1986) as man with doll
- Wild at Heart (1990) as Uncle Pooch
- Delirious (1991) as Typewriter Repairman
- Witchboard 2: The Devil's Doorway (1993) as Morris
- Revenge of the Nerds IV: Nerds in Love (1994) as Mr. Dawson
- Dark and Stormy Night (2009) as Gunny
- Lookin' Up (2016) as Vic Greeley (final film role)

=== Television ===
- Meet Millie (1951-1954) as Alfred Prinzmetal
- The Danny Thomas Show (1958) as Oscar 'Evil Eye' Schultz
- The Detectives (1961, Episode: "Hit and Miss") as Irwin
- M Squad (1960, episode: "A Gun for Mother's Day") as Mr. Arbogast, the liquor store owner
- Top Cat (1961–1962) as Choo-Choo (voice)
- Gomer Pyle, USMC (1968, Episode: "The Carriage Waits") as Mr. Kendall
- Mod Squad (1969) as Sol Alpert / Sol Albert
- I Dream of Jeannie (1970, Episode: "One of Our Hotels Is Growing") as Perkins
- Wait Till Your Father Gets Home (1972, Episode: "Love Story") as Norman
- CB Bears (1977) as Skids
- Charlie's Angels (1977, Episode: "Circus of Terror") as Zobar
- CHiPS (1978, Episode: "Disaster Squad") as Hilmer Nelson
- Alice (1978-1985) as Henry Beesmeyer
- Saturday Supercade (1984) as Shellshock 'Shelly' Turtle (voice)
- MacGyver (1986, Episode: "A Prisoner of Conscience") as The Chess Master
- The Smurfs (1986) as Gourdy (voice)
- Top Cat and the Beverly Hills Cats (1988) as Choo-Choo (voice)
- Wake, Rattle & Roll (1990, Segment: "Fender Bender 500") as Choo Choo (voice)
- Monsters (1990, Episode: "Murray's Monster") as Murray Van Pelt
- Garfield and Friends (1991, Episode: "Moo Cow Mutt/Big Bad Buddy Bird/Angel Puss") as Angel Puss (voice)
- The Cartoon Cartoon Show (1995, Episode: "O. Ratz: Rat in a Hot Tin Can") as Dave D. Fly
- Johnny Bravo (1997, Episode: Going Batty/Berry the Butler/Red Faced in the White House) as Woody (voice)
- Becker (1998–2004) as Mr. Gordon
- Cool Cats in Interview Alley (2004, Video short) as himself
- The Garfield Show (2012) as Hiram "High" Pressure (voice)
