= Bob Haymes =

American actor

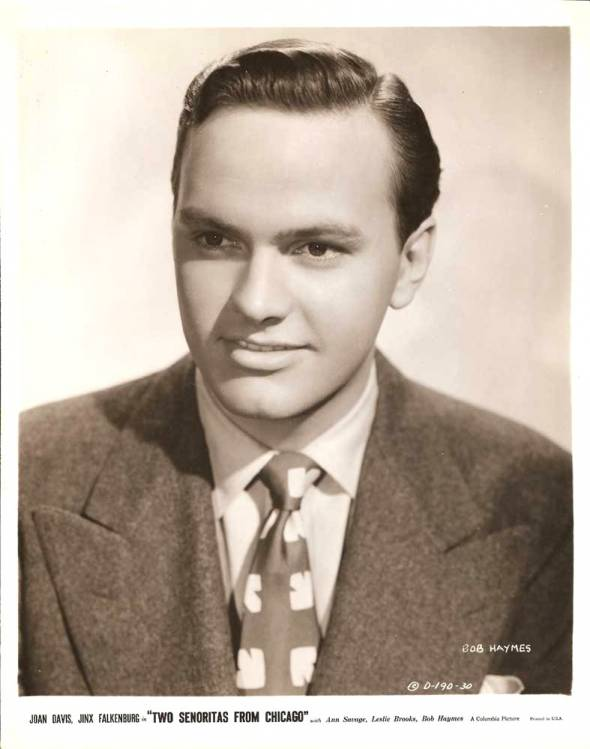
- A publicity photograph for Two Señoritas From Chicago (1943)
- Born: Robert William Haymes; March 29, 1923; White Plains, New York, U.S.
- Died: January 27, 1989 (aged 65); Hilton Head Island, South Carolina, U.S.
- Other names: Robert Stanton; Bob Stanton
- Occupations: Singer; songwriter; actor; presenter
- Years active: 1943–1989
- Spouses: Dian Owens (m. 1941; div. 1952) Eunice Ward (m. 1952; div. 1972) Sunny Fleitas (m. 1973; div. 1984) Dee Workman (m. 1985)
- Children: 3

Robert William Haymes (March 29, 1923 – January 27, 1989), also known by the stage names Robert Stanton and Bob Stanton, was an American singer, songwriter, actor and radio and television presenter. He is best remembered for co-writing the song "That's All", part of the Great American Songbook. He was the younger brother of singer and actor Dick Haymes.

== Career ==
Haymes began his career in the early 1940s as a vocalist in the bands of Carl Hoff and Bob Chester.

In 1942 Haymes began work, under the name "Bob Stanton", for the radio show Gillette Cavalcade of Sports. He continued with the program until 1946, when it was turned into a television show on NBC; he became the host of the television show until 1949. He also served as the host of other NBC shows, all under the name "Bob Stanton", including game show Campus Hoopla during the show's run from 1946 to 1947, Television Screen Magazine in 1948, the country music show Village Barn in 1949, and the show Around the Town in 1950.

During this time Haymes began acting in films, including Is Everybody Happy? (1943) and Mr. Winkle Goes to War (1944). In several films, including the 1945 Abbott and Costello in Hollywood, he was credited as "Robert Stanton" (a screen name that had been used earlier in the 1940s by film actor Kirby Grant).

In 1952, he had his only known television acting job, starring in the DuMont Television Network sitcom It's a Business with Leo De Lyon; the two played Broadway song publishers. He appeared under the name "Bob Haymes".

In the early 1950s, Haymes began work as a songwriter. In 1952, he co-wrote the song "My Love, My Love" with Nick Acquaviva, which became a hit when recorded by Joni James (Acquaviva's eventual sister-in-law) later that year. That same year, Haymes copyrighted the song entitled, "C'est Tout," which was the early incarnation of his most notable song, "That's All." In 1953, he refined the song's lyrics with Alan Brandt, who was subsequently credited as co-writer. The song was first performed by Nat King Cole in 1957, and became a hit when recorded by Bobby Darin in 1959. It has since been recorded by dozens of artists including Frank Sinatra, Mel Tormé, Johnny Mathis, Nina Simone, Bennie Green, Johnny Lytle, The Three Sounds, Lou Donaldson, Michael Bublé, and Rod Stewart.

In 1968, Haymes served as the national television director for Richard Nixon's presidential campaign.

== Filmography ==
- Two Señoritas from Chicago (1943)
- Sailor's Holiday (1944)
- Swing Out the Blues (1944)
- Blonde from Brooklyn (1945)
- Abbott and Costello in Hollywood (1945)
- Blondie's Lucky Day (1946)
- So Dear to My Heart (1948)

== Latter years ==
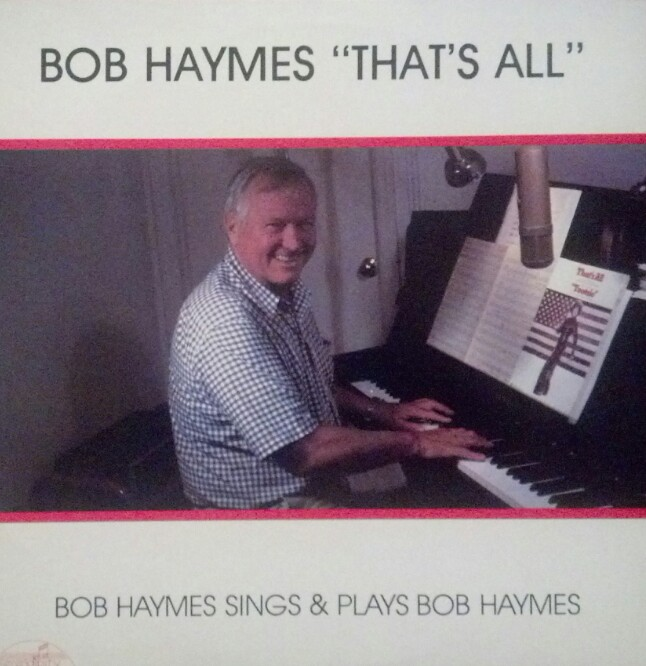
Album cover photo by Eaddy Mays 1984

During the 1970s and 1980s, Haymes owned and operated an audio visual production company and continued to write music. In 1984, he recorded his final album, That's All: Bob Haymes Sings & Plays Bob Haymes. The album was recorded in Haymes's studio, That's Not All Studios, in Port Washington, New York, and released by Serendipity Recordings, Inc. It included four new songs he wrote during the early 1980s after meeting Dee Workman. The album, including the new songs, is still for limited sale by private collectors, on Amazon.com and eBay.

== Personal life and death ==
Haymes married Dian Owens in 1941. They had three children Candice, Vivienne, and Robert. Haymes married Workman on January 26, 1985. His step-daughter from that marriage is film and television actress Eaddy Mays. Haymes and Workman remained married until his death on Hilton Head Island, South Carolina from amyotrophic lateral sclerosis (ALS) on January 27, 1989.
