= Florence Halop =

American actress (1923–1986)

- Halop in 1941
- Born: January 23, 1923; New York City, U.S.
- Died: July 15, 1986 (aged 63); Los Angeles, California, U.S.
- Other name: Flo Halop
- Occupation: Actress
- Years active: 1939–1986
- Spouse: George Gruskin (m. 1949; died 1975)
- Children: 2

Florence Halop (January 23, 1923 – July 15, 1986) was an American actress. She was best known for her roles as surly patient Mrs. Hufnagel on the drama St. Elsewhere and the raspy-voiced bailiff Florence Kleiner on the sitcom Night Court. Halop was the sister of Billy Halop, one of the original Dead End Kids/East Side Kids.

== Early years ==
Halop was from a theatrical family. She was born in Jamaica, New York. Her mother was a dancer. She had two brothers: Billy Halop, an actor who worked on radio, in films, and in television, and Joel Tucker Halop (1934-2006).

== Radio ==
An item in a 1931 newspaper reported that Halop was "the youngest star of the National Broadcasting Company -- only 7 and broadcasting for the last three years." She first appeared on Coast-to-Coast on a Bus. Later, she was heard on Wheatenaville. Halop was the second of many to play Miss Duffy, the owner's man-crazy daughter in Duffy's Tavern. She was Hot Breath Houlihan on The Jimmy Durante Show.

== Television ==
Halop transitioned to television in the early 1950s with a role in the series Meet Millie. After the series ended in 1956, Halop guest starred on various television series during the late 1950s and 1960s including roles in Playhouse 90, Going My Way, and I Spy. Between 1976 and 1982, she guested six times on the TV series Barney Miller, each time playing a different character. In 1984, she had a guest stint on St. Elsewhere. Halop's character, Mrs. Hufnagel, was originally intended to be a one-episode spot, but her role was so well received the writers found a way to get her into 17 more episodes over the course of the season.

In 1985, Halop succeeded Selma Diamond as a bailiff on Night Court after Diamond's death from lung cancer. Halop, who was also a heavy smoker, similarly developed lung cancer and died during the series run. She was replaced by Marsha Warfield, who played Roz Russell until the series ended in 1992.

== Family ==
Halop was married to George Gruskin, who died in 1975. They were the parents of two daughters, Georgeanna and Benita. She died in 1986 of cancer.

== Filmography ==
Film
| Year | Title | Role | Notes |
|---|---|---|---|
| 1939 | Nancy Drew... Reporter | Phyllis Gimble, Journalism Student | Uncredited |
| 1940 | Junior G-Men | Mary | Serial |
| 1966 | The Glass Bottom Boat | Lady on Telephone | Uncredited; Alternative title: The Spy in Lace Panties |
| 1970 | The Boatniks | Florence, Bert's Wife | Uncredited |
Television
| Year | Title | Role | Notes |
| 1951 | Goodyear Television Playhouse | | Season 1 Episode 1: "October Story" |
| 1951 | Holiday Hotel | | Unknown episodes |
| 1952 | I Love Lucy | Woman on Phone | Season 2 Episode 8: "Redecorating" |
| 1952–1956 | Meet Millie | Mrs. Bronson | 78 episodes |
| 1958 | Playhouse 90 | Mrs. Laurie | Season 2 Episode 23: "No Time at All" |
| 1959 | The Untouchables | Flora Weinberg | Season 1 Episode 9: "The Tri-State Gang" |
| 1962 | Saints and Sinners | Ruth Melton Foss | Season 1 Episode 10: "A Shame for the Diamond Wedding" |
| 1963 | Going My Way | Mrs. Kravitz | Season 1 Episode 23: "Cornelius Come Home" |
| 1963 | The Danny Thomas Show | Matilda | Season 11 Episode 7: "My Fair Uncle" |
| 1963 | The Alfred Hitchcock Hour | Jenny, Mr. Crawford's Maid | Season 2 Episode 7: "Starring the Defense" (uncredited) |
| 1963 | The New Phil Silvers Show | Phil Silvers fan | 1 episode |
| 1965 | The Dick Van Dyke Show | Mrs. Spaulding | Season 5 Episode 4: "The Ugliest Dog in the World" |
| 1965 | Hank | Mrs. Wallace | 1 episode |
| 1967 | Captain Nice | Mrs. Kowalski | Season 1 Episode 5: "The Man with Three Blue Eyes" |
| 1967 | That Girl | Clerk | Season 2 Episode 5: "The Apartment" |
| 1968 | That Girl | Librarian (uncredited) | Season 3 Episode 6: "Secret Ballot" |
| 1968 | I Spy | Clara | Season 3 Episode 21: "Shana" |
| 1970 | The Mod Squad | Nurse | Season 2 Episode 22: "A Time for Remembering" |
| 1970 | But I Don't Want to Get Married! | Mrs. Green | Television movie |
| 1971 | Allan | Blanche Fisher | Television movie |
| 1971 | The Chicago Teddy Bears | Mrs. Krausmeyer | Season 1 Episode 7: "Linc Minds the Baby" |
| 1971 | Love, American Style | Mrs. Jones | Season 3 Episode 9: "Love and the Big Mother" (segment) |
| 1971 | Love, American Style | Guest | Season 3 Episode 14: "Love and the Motel Mixup" (segment) |
| 1972 | Insight | | 1 episode |
| 1972 | Wait till Your Father Gets Home | Voice | Season 1 Episode 14: "The Beach Vacation" |
| 1972 | The New Scooby-Doo Movies | Voices | 15 episodes |
| 1974 | Here's Lucy | Old Woman | Season 6 Episode 18: "Lucy, the Sheriff" |
| 1975 | Queen of the Stardust Ballroom | Sylvia | Television movie |
| 1975 | Police Woman | Hannah Victor | Season 1 Episode 20: "Hannah Victor" |
| 1976 | Gemini Man | Miss Evans | Season 1 Episode 8: "Escape Hatch" |
| 1976 | All in the Family | Martha Linfoot | Season 7 Episode 11: "Mr. Edith Bunker" |
| 1976–1982 | Barney Miller | Ms. Mabel Kleiner / Mrs. Pierce / Evelyn Hawley / Karen Golden / Wanda LaMear / Wilma Kestner | 6 episodes |
| 1977 | The Love Boat | Millie Lindsay | Season 1 Episode 3: "Ex Plus Y/Golden Agers/Graham and Kelly" |
| 1977 | CHiPs | Mrs. Abel | Season 1 Episode 10: "Highway Robbery" |
| 1977 | The Betty White Show | Marian | Season 1 Episode 8: "Good Night, Sweet Fletch" |
| 1977 | The Betty White Show | Marian | Season 1 Episode 11: "Joyce's Wedding" |
| 1977 | The Betty White Show | Marian | Season 1 Episode 12: "Fletcher's Decision" |
| 1977 | Alice | Annie | Season 1 Episode 23: "The Bundle" |
| 1978 | Soap | Aunt Esther | Season 2 Episode 2 |
| 1979 | Archie Bunker's Place | Aunt Gussie | Season 1 Episode 1: "Archie's New Partner: Part 1" |
| 1979 | Archie Bunker's Place | Aunt Gussie | Season 1 Episode 2: "Archie's New Partner: Part 2" |
| 1979 | Archie Bunker's Place | Aunt Gussie | Season 1 Episode 14: "The Shabbat Dinner" |
| 1979 | Angie | Ceil | Season 2 Episode 10: "Harvey's Mother" |
| 1979 | Angie | Ceil | Season 2 Episode 12: "The Gambler" |
| 1980 | Angie | Ceil | Season 2 Episode 17: "Marie Moves Out" |
| 1980 | Angie | Ceil | Season 2 Episode 19: "February Fever" |
| 1980 | This Is the Life | Old Woman | Episode: "Independence and '76" |
| 1981 | Alice | Old Lady | Season 5 Episode 16: "Macho, Macho Mel" |
| 1982 | Gimme a Break! | Mrs. Falkenberg | Season 2 Episode 4: "Grandpa's Visit" |
| 1983 | Condo | Lady in Sauna | Season 1 Episode: "The Neighbors" |
| 1983 | It Takes Two | Florence | Season 1 Episode 12: "The Choice" |
| 1983 | It Takes Two | Florence | Season 1 Episode 21: "The Suit" |
| 1983 | Hill Street Blues | Fish Store Customer | Season 4 Episode 2: "Ba-Bing, Ba-Bing" |
| 1981 | Alice | Old Lady | Season 8 Episode 3: "Jolene Gets Her Wings" |
| 1984 | Diff'rent Strokes | Mrs. Gruber | Season 6 Episode 15: "The Hitchhikers: Part 2" |
| 1984 | Brothers | Mrs. Veltnelman | Season 1 Episode 10: "Standards and Practices" |
| 1984–1985 | St. Elsewhere | Mrs. Hufnagel | 18 episodes |
| 1985 | Joanna | Mrs. Benson | Television movie |
| 1985 | Anything for Love | Claire | Television movie |
| 1985–1986 | Night Court | Bailiff Florence Kleiner | 22 episodes, (final appearance) |
