= Meet Millie =

American radio and TV situation comedy series, 1951–1956

Florence Halop, Marvin Kaplan and Elena Verdugo in Meet Millie

Meet Millie is a situation comedy about a wisecracking Manhattan secretary from Brooklyn. It made a transition from radio to television in the early 1950s. In the live television version, Mom and Millie were living in Jackson Heights, Queens. The popularity of this series led to a four-year run on CBS Television.

== Radio ==
The radio series began on CBS July 2, 1951, continuing until September 23, 1954. Audrey Totter created the role of Millie Bronson on radio, but she dropped out when her film studio refused to allow her to appear as the character on television.

After seeing Elena Verdugo in Columbia's Thief of Damascus (1952), Eddie Bracken’s secretary recommended her to Bracken when a replacement for Totter was needed. Verdugo brought the character to television in October 1952 and also took over the radio role beginning January 1, 1953.

Bea Benaderet originally appeared as Millie's mother on radio, but due to her commitment to play "Blanche Morton" on The George Burns and Gracie Allen Show, her role was filled by Florence Halop on TV (and eventually on the radio show).

== Characters and story ==
The show opened with the announcer's introduction: "A gay, new comedy about the life and loves of a secretary in Manhattan. It's time to Meet Millie." Millie lived in a Jackson Heights apartment with her mother (Florence Halop), who is continually on the lookout for a possible husband for Millie. Millie's boyfriend, J.R. "Johnnie" Boone, Jr. (Ross Ford), is the son of her boss (Earle Ross, Roland Winters). Aspiring poet-composer Alfred Prinzmetal (Marvin Kaplan) drops in for friendly visits. Isabel Randolph portrayed Mrs. Boone. Other cast regulars were Virginia Vincent, Harry Cheshire and Ray Montgomery.

Meet Millie, one of the first series telecast from the CBS Television City facility in Hollywood, was seen on CBS from October 25, 1952, until March 6, 1956. The live studio audience responded to Meet Millie with such enthusiasm that it was sometimes necessary for the actors to freeze in position until the laughter stopped. Kaplan and Verdugo became friends during the years the show was in production, and their close friendship continued for decades.

An episode of Meet Millie was shown September 15, 2000 at the Library of Congress' Mary Pickford Theater. Shows are in the collection of the Paley Center for Media.

== Production (TV version) ==
Jack Donohue and Frank Galen were the producers, and Donohue directed. Galen, Howard Leeds, and Arthur Julian were the writers. The sustaining program originated at KNXT in Hollywood.

== Listen to ==
- Same Time, Same Station: Meet Millie (October 22, 1953)
