= Rent-a-Wreck =

American car rental company

- Founded: 1968; 58 years ago in Los Angeles, California, United States
- Services: Car rental
- Website: www.rentawreck.com

Rent-a-Wreck is an American car rental company that rents vehicles that have been previously owned by individuals or other car rental companies. The company operates primarily in neighborhood locations, often connected to or in close proximity to repair facilities, car dealerships or other automotive-related services. Certain Rent-a-Wreck locations offer airport pick-up and drop-off services.

== History ==
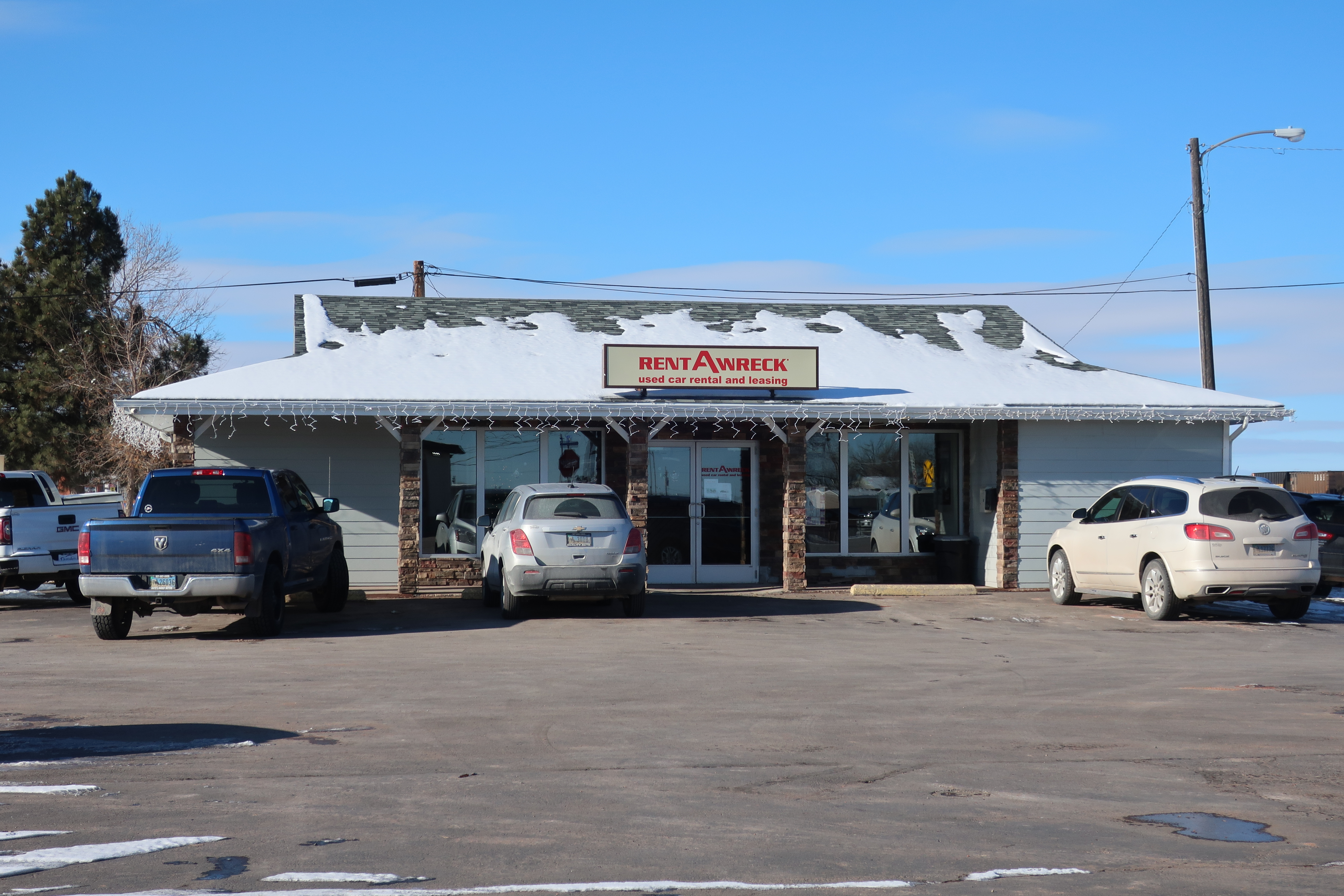
A Rent-a-Wreck in Gillette, Wyoming

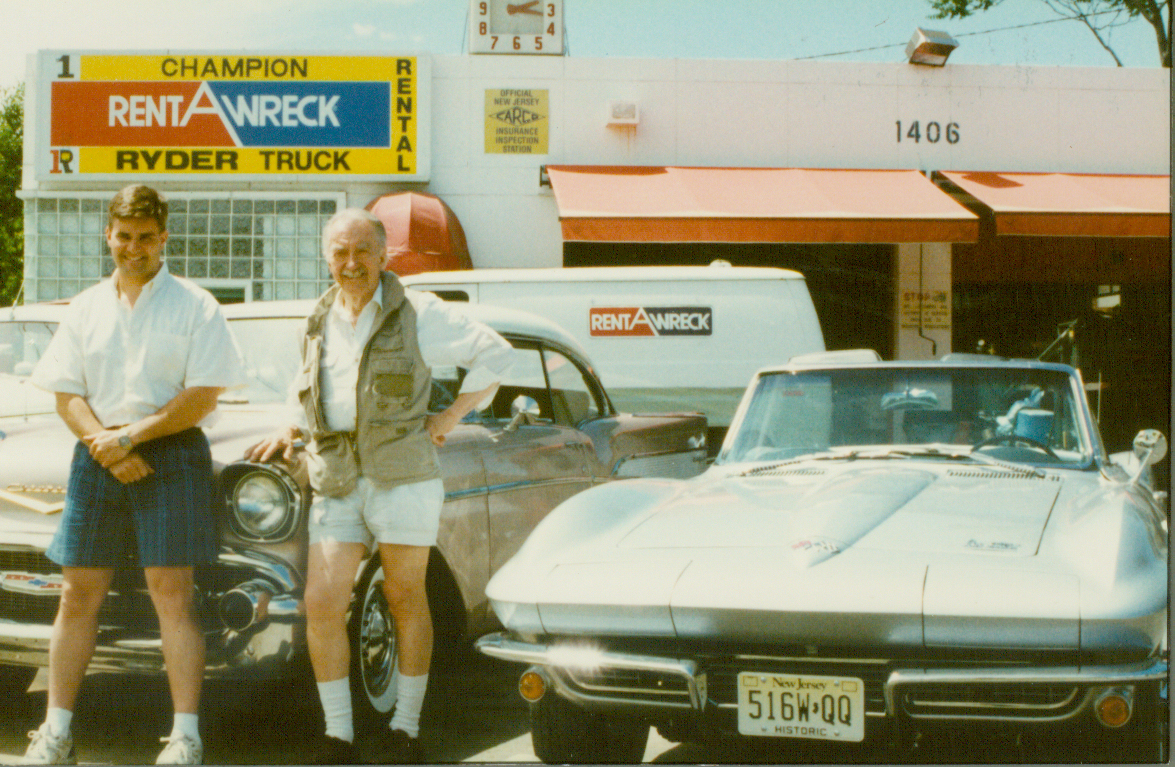
The owners of a Rent-a-Wreck in Cherry Hill, New Jersey posing with a 1957 Chevrolet and a Chevrolet Corvette Sting Ray

Rent-a-Wreck was founded in 1968 in Los Angeles, and sold its first franchise in 1973. Since then, it has opened franchised locations in 41 of the 50 U.S. states, Scandinavia, and Sint Maarten island in the Caribbean. The company's spokesman in TV commercials was comedian Arnold Stang.

Rent-a-Wreck was purchased by JJF Management on January 26, 2006. In 2017, the company filed for Chapter 11 bankruptcy. Longtime employee Jason Maneli became president of Rent-a-Wreck in July 2018.

== International expansion ==
A separate Calgary-based Rent-a-Wreck was founded in 1976 in Prince George, BC and was not affiliated with the United States-based firm. This Canadian operation has been known as PractiCar since 2008. As of October 2024, PractiCar offers car and truck rentals in six provinces and the Yukon Territory.
