= Honey Nut Cheerios =

General Mills breakfast cereal

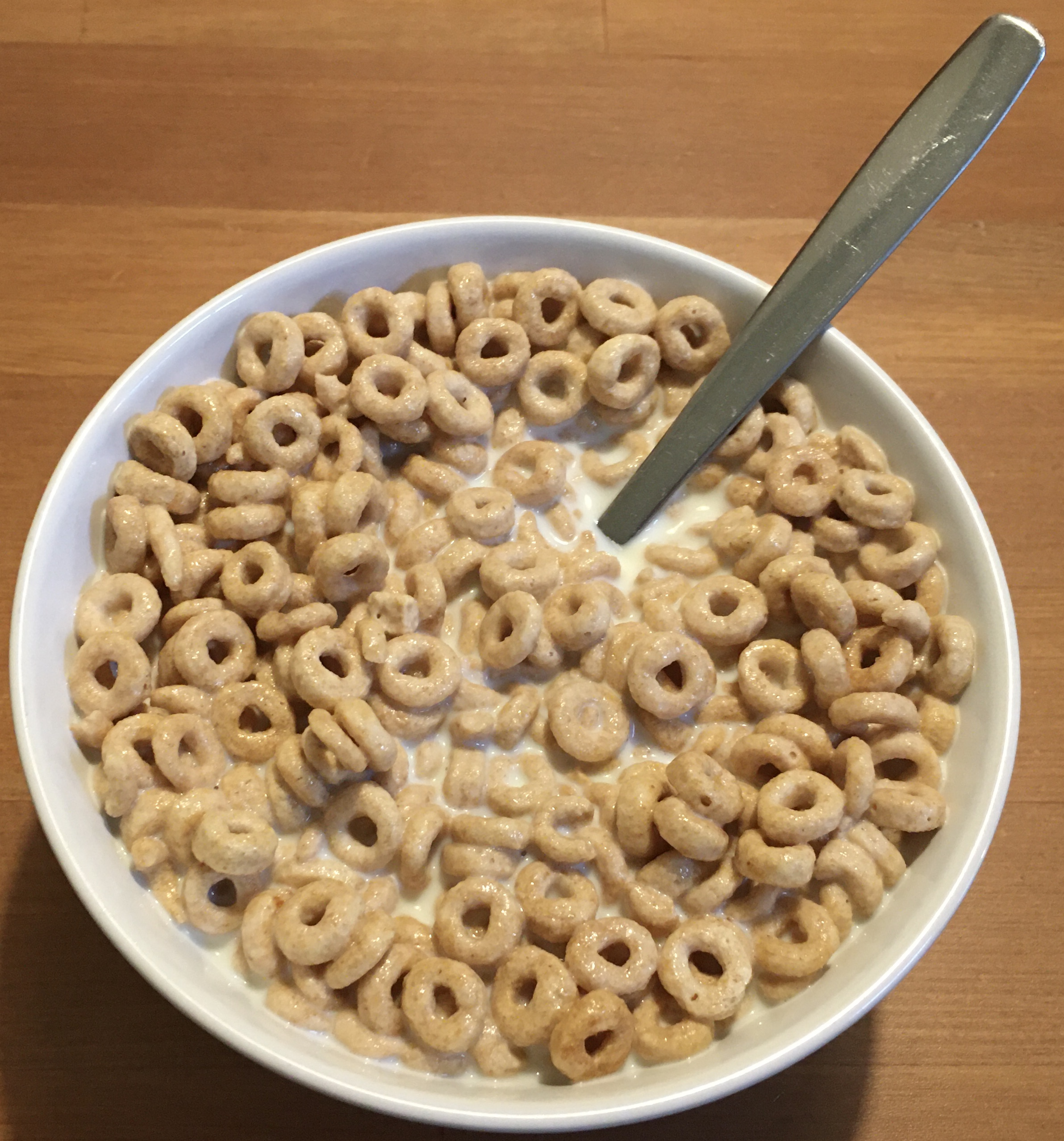
- General Mills Honey Nut Cheerios, with milk
- Product type: Breakfast cereal
- Current owner: General Mills
- Country: United States
- Introduced: 1979; 47 years ago
- Markets: Worldwide

Honey Nut Cheerios is a breakfast cereal made by the American food manufacturer General Mills. Introduced in 1979, it is a variation of the original Cheerios cereal with a honey and almond flavor. In 2011, Honey Nut Cheerios was the best-selling breakfast cereal in the United States.

Honey Nut Cheerios was the third variation of Cheerios introduced; Cinnamon Nut Cheerios was test marketed in 1976. There have been many other Cheerios variations, including Maple Cheerios, Chocolate Cheerios, Frosted Cheerios and Blueberry Cheerios.

== History ==
Historically, Honey Nut Cheerios has participated in much the same promotional advertising as the original brand, while collaborating with the field of NASCAR and especially driver Bill Lester, in promoting healthy diets. In 1985, Baskin-Robbins introduced an ice cream flavor based on the cereal called Honey Nut Crunch. Promotional tie-ins included gift certificates in cereal boxes and special Honey Nut Crunch sundaes in stores. The first 7 series of Honey Nut Cheerios did not have the bee mascot on the box, It was not until series 8 that the bee appeared on the box. Cereal boxes from 1979 without the bee are called 'pre-bee' and are very rare.

General Mills has been active in the conservation of bees since 2011; in 2011, the company began investing in the Xerces Society to help promote biodiversity and pollinator conservation. In March 2017, General Mills announced the Buzz Bee image had been removed from boxes of Honey Nut Cheerios. Images of the new box showed a white empty space where Buzz Bee used to be. Below the image of the bowl of cereal, a plea to "Help Bring Back The Bees" was added. This was to raise awareness of pollinator decline. In the announcement, General Mills made note that 30% of ingredients they use depend on pollinators, and that the company plans to expand their pollinator habitat to 3,300 acres. As part of the campaign, 1.5 billion packets of wildflower seeds were included in boxes of Honey Nut Cheerios.

This campaign has struck controversy in some environmental communities. Kathryn Turner, an ecologist, commented that the packages of seeds contain species that are invasive to some geographic locations, and urged individuals to become more educated before planting the seeds.

== Mascot and promotions ==
Buzz Bee
- First appearance: 1979
- Voiced by: Arnold Stang (1979–1992); Hadley Kay (briefly); Billy West (1992–2004); George Trahanis (1998); Charlie Schlatter (2004–2015); Jason Marsden (2015–2016); Oliver Wyman (2016); Sam Heyn (2019–2023); Travis Moscinski (2023–present)

In-universe information
- Species: Bee
- Gender: Male
- Occupation: Mascot of Honey Nut Cheerios, Honey Enthusiast

Honey Nut Cheerios' mascot is an anthropomorphic bee named Buzz, designed for the first commercials by Dean Yeagle at Zander's Animation Parlour in New York City. The bee did not have a name until 2000, when Kristine Tong, a fifth grade student from Coolidge, Texas, won a national contest to name him, dubbing him "BuzzBee". Several different voice actors have provided the voice of Buzz: originally voiced by Arnold Stang until 1992, he was then voiced by Hadley Kay, Billy West, George Trahanis, Charlie Schlatter, Jason Marsden, Oliver Wyman, Sam Heyn and Travis Moscinski. Buzz appeared as the host in the Honey Nut Cheerios Spelling Bee board game.

== Taglines ==
Many of this cereal's taglines overlapped with each other. They were used on different advertisements.

- It's a honey of an O. (1979–2004)
- It's Honey Nut Cheerios! (1979–1992; 2000–2004; 2014–Present)
- It's Irrezzzzistable! (1992–1993)
- Race for the taste! (1993–1995)
- Little O, Big Taste! (1995–1999)
- Nobody can say "No" to Honey Nut Cheerios. (1995–2004)
- From the hive that's nuts about honey! (2004–2008)
- Bee happy, Bee healthy! (2004–2013)
- Must Be the Honey. (2013, based on Nelly's "Ride wit Me")
- Good Goes Round. (2016–Present)
- Have a Change of Heart. (2022–Present)

== Nutrition ==
Honey Nut Cheerios maintains most of the same health claims as the original Cheerios, due to its soluble fiber. Package nutritional information asserts that "three grams of soluble fiber daily from whole grain oat foods, like Honey Nut Cheerios, in a diet low in saturated fat and cholesterol, may reduce the risk of heart disease. Honey Nut Cheerios has 0.75g per serving." As with Cheerios, the American Heart Association certified the cereal as "heart-healthy" for meeting the food criteria for saturated fat and cholesterol content.

Honey Nut Cheerios also contains more sugar (9.6 Grams/serving) than original Cheerios, which contain 1.2 Grams/serving. This sugar comes from sugar, honey and golden syrup.
