= Second Fiddle to a Steel Guitar =

1965 film directed by Victor Duncan

- Directed by: Victor Duncan
- Written by: Seymour D. Rothman
- Produced by: Victor C. Lewis Jr.
- Starring: Arnold Stang; Pamela Hayes; Leo Gorcey; Huntz Hall
- Cinematography: Gary Galbraith
- Edited by: John Mullen
- Music by: Audrey Williams
- Distributed by: Marathon Pictures (USA); Astral Films (Canada)
- Release date: September 15, 1965
- Running time: 107 minutes
- Language: English

Second Fiddle to a Steel Guitar is a 1965 American musical film directed by Victor Duncan, and is notable for the reunion of Bowery Boys Leo Gorcey and Huntz Hall. The film was released on September 15, 1965, by the independent Marathon Pictures.

== Plot ==
Jubal A. Bristol loves country music, but his socially conscious wife thinks it is beneath her to listen to it. Mrs. Bristol is planning an operatic event for a theater, but the company that was supposed to perform is stranded in New York City. Jubal saves the day by gathering a large group of country artists, who stage a revue in the theater.

== Cast ==
- Arnold Stang as Jubal A. Bristol
- Pamela Hayes as Mrs. Bristol
- Huntz Hall as Huntz
- Leo Gorcey as Leo

The cast includes a variety of country-music stars, including Faron Young, Kitty Wells, Homer and Jethro, Little Jimmy Dickens, Lefty Frizzell, Bill Monroe and the Bluegrass Boys, Dottie West, George Hamilton IV, Pete Drake, Sonny James, Minnie Pearl, Billy Walker, Connie Smith, Johnnie Wright, Del Reeves, and Webb Pierce.

== Production ==
Arnold Stang recalled that Second Fiddle to a Steel Guitar was conceived to benefit Audrey Williams, the widow of Hank Williams, and that Faron Young, as a favor to Mrs. Williams, personally recruited the all-star talent for this low-budget feature produced in Tennessee. Audrey Williams receives screen credit for the music.

The film was deliberately edited so that it could reach a conclusion at the one-hour mark, but continue with musical encores for the rest of the film. This was so the film could be sold as a one-hour TV special (without the encores) if the longer-length theatrical release did not work out. Because no major studio expressed interest in releasing Second Fiddle to a Steel Guitar to theaters nationally, the film was released regionally and became a success in theaters and drive-ins throughout the Southern United States.

== Leo Gorcey and Huntz Hall ==
The film marked a reunion of former Dead End Kids turned Bowery Boys, Leo Gorcey and Huntz Hall, who had not worked together since 1956 (in Crashing Las Vegas). They, together with Stang, furnish the comedy throughout this musical feature. Much of the comedy is simple and unrehearsed (Gorcey and Hall as paperhangers putting up theatrical posters; Hall being mistaken for a genuine opera singer and repeatedly being hit over the head, etc.). For the only time since 1940, Huntz Hall was billed over Leo Gorcey in the advertising and promotional materials.

Gorcey and Hall reunited only once more, for a cameo appearance among other former movie stars in the youth-oriented comedy The Phynx (1970).

== Reception ==
"Stone Cold Country" reviewed the film and said, "Pop this one in after church on Sunday, you'll be glad you did."

== Home media ==
Second Fiddle to a Steel Guitar was released on DVD on February 27, 2007.
