= Top Dog =

The expression "top dog" is an idiom for the boss or the leader. In a competition, it is also the favorite or the one expected to win, and the opposite of the underdog. It may be a shorthand reference for a dominance hierarchy.

Top Dog may also refer to:

- Top Dog (comics), a comic book character from Top Dog series by Star Comics (a Marvel Comics imprint)
- The Top Dog, a 1918 British film
- Top Dog (1995 film), a 1995 action film with Chuck Norris
- Top Dog (2014 film), a 2014 crime film with Leo Gregory
- Top Dog (rapper), member of the hip hop group O.G.C.
- Top dog, another name for the card game big two
- Top Dawg Entertainment, independent record label

== See also ==
- America's Top Dog, a 2020 American reality series
- Top Cat (disambiguation)
