= Bring Back the Bees =

Environmental campaign

Bring Back the Bees, or #BringBacktheBees, is a hashtag activism campaign to raise awareness over the rapidly declining bee population. One of the leading causes of this drastic decrease is the use of harmful pesticides, such as neonicotinoids. These chemicals, also known as neonics, are among the most commonly used pesticides. They are used extensively in agriculture, as well as in home and garden centers. However, research has shown that exposure can kill bees directly, or make them more susceptible to other impacts like disease and climate change.

== Overview ==
Honey Nut Cheerios and Burt's Bees joined together in 2014 to inform people of this potentially catastrophic issue. The cereal brand has temporarily removed their mascot, Buzz, from their boxes as a way to get their message across. Honey Nut Cheerios has offered free wildflower packets to customers, claiming to have given out 1.5 billion seeds during the campaign. The seeds are supplied by the Canadian company Veseys Seeds. The campaign has been praised by advertising professionals as an example of cause marketing in which the cause is actually relevant to the firm's business, but the company's efforts have been criticized because some of the wildflowers involved are classified as invasive species in certain geographical regions. Burt's Bees has planted 5,000 wildflower seeds for every special edition #BringBacktheBees lip balm sold.

Author Rhonda Fleming Hayes suggests "bees like flowers in blues and yellows with a shallow landing area".

The Friends of the Earth Organization has also been an integral part of the campaign. On their website, they list many important steps readers can take to bee an active part of the solution, such as telling their local representative or keeping their garden bee-friendly.

There have been widespread physical demonstrations associated with this movement, such as a swarm around the British Parliament and protests at various Lowe's stores across the U.S. and Canada selling bee-killing pesticides.

According to an article published on the fact-checking website Snopes, a number of baseless rumors have circulated about the Bring Back the Bees campaign. For example:

- General Mills is itself responsible for killing honeybees through its use of the herbicide glyphosate.
- Veseys Seeds is owned by Monsanto.

According to the Snopes article, these rumors are false. General Mills does use glyphosate, but—unlike neonicotinoids—glyphosate has minimal toxicity to honeybees. Veseys Seeds is a family-owned private company.
