= Leo De Lyon =

American actor (1925–2021)

Irving Levin (April 26, 1925 – September 18, 2021), known professionally by his stage name of Leo De Lyon, was an American actor best known for his roles as Spook and Brain in the prime-time animated series Top Cat.

== Career ==
De Lyon co-starred with Bob Haymes and Dorothy Loudon in the DuMont Television Network sitcom It's a Business (March–May 1952). His specialty on this show was singing and whistling two different tunes – notably the Farandole from Georges Bizet's Arlesienne Suite – at the same time.

He appeared at the London Palladium in 1956 with the Platters and Lonnie Donegan.

In 1961, he voiced Spook and The Brain in the short-lived Hanna-Barbera primetime animated sitcom Top Cat.

In 1962, he voiced a character on a recording of a song written by Al Lerner for a young artist named David Lucas for Doris Day and husband Marty Melcher's Arwin Records. The song was performed by Pookie and Hippy of The Soupy Sales Show. De Lyon contributed a "guttural" hook "Uga Uga Boola, Uga Boola Boola Uga". He also voiced Flunkey the baboon in Disney's Jungle Book (1967). He also recorded a 45 rpm release (date unknown; probably early 1960s) for Musicor Records (distributed by United Artists Records), label number 1001, under Leo DeLyon and the Musclemen: "Sick Manny's Gym" (written by Alan Kooper) / "Plunkin" (written by Alan Kooper and Eric Krackow). The Musclemen included Al Kooper on guitar and Eric Krackow on bass.

In the mid- and late-1970s he performed on stage as pianist and vocal entertainer and was musical director for several artists, including Sandler and Young.

In the mid-1990s he recorded several songs with Mark Harris, who was a frequent guest on The Howard Stern Show. During the 1980s he returned to Hanna-Barbera to provide guest voices on shows such as The Smurfs and Paw Paws. He also once again voiced Brain and Spook in the 1988 television special Top Cat and the Beverly Hills Cats.

De Lyon retired from performing in 2011. He died on September 18, 2021, at the age of 96. He was the last surviving cast member of the original Top Cat.

== Film ==
- The Man Called Flintstone (1966) – performer: "The Happy Sounds of Pareé"
- The Jungle Book (1967) – Flunkey (uncredited)

== Television and other ==
- Captain Kangaroo, episode unknown (1956) – Moving Man
- The Flintstones, episode "The Beauty Contest" (1961) – John / Charles / Lucky / Lodge Member / Man #1 / Big Louie
- Top Cat – Spook / The Brain (1961–1962)
- Bewitched, episode "The Short Happy Circuit of Aunt Clara" (1966) – Jenkins
- Jack and the Beanstalk, TV special – Woggle-Bird (1967)
- The Incredible Hulk, episode "King of the Beach" (1981) – Trainer
- Paw Paws - Additional voices (1985–1986)
- The Smurfs – Additional voices (1986)
- Foofur – Additional voices (1987)
- Top Cat and the Beverly Hills Cats, TV movie (1988) – Brain / Spook
- Back to Hoagy's Alley: The Making of 'Top Cat', video short (2004) – Himself
- Cool Cats in Interview Alley, video short (2004) – Himself
