= It's a Business =

- Genre: Situation Comedy
- Created by: Bob Weiskopf
- Starring: Bob Haymes; Leo De Lyon; Dorothy Loudon
- Country of origin: United States
- No. of seasons: 1
- No. of episodes: 10

Production
- Running time: 30 minutes

Original release
- Network: DuMont
- Release: March 19 – May 21, 1952

It's a Business is a television sitcom that aired on the DuMont Television Network for ten episodes in 1952.

== Broadcast history ==
It's a Business aired on DuMont from March 19 to May 21, 1952, replacing Famous Jury Trials, and was a half-hour program that aired on Wednesdays at 9 pm. The series starred Bob Haymes and Leo De Lyon as Broadway song publishers in the 1900s, during the vaudeville era, and Dorothy Loudon as their secretary.

The series was set in a time prior to prohibition, and episodes included songs from that period as the stars tried to publish songs and get popular singers of that er to use them. Haymes, De Lyon, and Loudon sang some of the songs.

== Production ==
The program was directed by Frank Bunetta and written by Bob Weiskopf. Paul Rosen was the producer. Mort Lindsey directed the music It was broadcast live from the Adelphi Theatre in New York City with no studio audience.

== Episode status ==
As with most DuMont series, no episodes are known to survive.

== See also ==
- List of programs broadcast by the DuMont Television Network
- List of surviving DuMont Television Network broadcasts

== Bibliography ==
- David Weinstein, The Forgotten Network: DuMont and the Birth of American Television (Philadelphia: Temple University Press, 2004) ISBN 1-59213-245-6
