= Paw Paws =

- Title card
- Directed by: Art Davis; Oscar Dufau; Don Lusk; Carl Urbano; Rudy Zamora; Alan Zaslove
- Voices of: Susan Blu; Ruth Buzzi; John Ingle; Don Messick; Howard Morris; Thom Pinto; Robert Ridgely; Stanley Ralph Ross; Alexandra Stoddart; Frank Welker
- Theme music composer: Hoyt Curtin
- Opening theme: "Paw Paw Bears"
- Ending theme: "Paw Paw Bears" (instrumental)
- Composer: Hoyt Curtin
- Country of origin: United States
- Original language: English
- No. of episodes: 21

Production
- Executive producers: William Hanna; Joseph Barbera
- Producer: Bernard Wolf
- Production company: Hanna-Barbera Productions

Original release
- Network: Syndicated
- Release: September 15, 1985 – February 2, 1986

Paw Paws (also known as Paw Paw Bears) is an American animated television series produced by Hanna-Barbera Productions that first aired in 1985 and 1986. It debuted as part of the weekday/weekend morning programming block The Funtastic World of Hanna-Barbera.

The series name is a play on the paw paw, a fruit cultivated by Native Americans and indigenous to North America, and a play on words with a bear's paw. Reruns of the show formerly aired on Cartoon Network and later Boomerang.

== Plot ==
Deep in a forest, a group of Native American bear cubs defend themselves from their enemies The Meanos, led by the evil sorcerer Dark Paw. He and his henchmen are after the Paw Paws' three large wooden totems, Totem Bear, Totem Tortoise, and Totem Eagle. The totems also serve as the tribe's protectors, coming to life when needed through means of Princess Paw Paw's Mystic Moonstone, which she wears around her neck, to defend the village.

Much like other Hanna-Barbera programs, such as The Smurfs, The Biskitts, Shirt Tales, Snorks and the Pound Puppies, the bears had names that denoted their personalities—Laughing Paw, Medicine Paw, Bumble Paw, etc. Brave Paw and Princess Paw Paw tended to be the leads, riding into adventures on their magical flying ponies, while aging Wise Paw served as tribal advisor. The mascot of the group was a tiny dog by the name of PaPooch.

== Characters ==
=== Paw Paws ===
- Wise Paw (voiced by John Ingle) is the chief leader of the Paw Paws, and is the oldest and wisest of the tribe.
- Princess Paw Paw (voiced by Susan Blu) is Wise Paw's daughter. She is beautiful and cares for everyone and the village. She carries around the Mystic Moonstone which has the power to bring Totem Bear, Turtle and Eagle to life. When she blows on her whistle, she can summon her flying horse Flying Cloud.
  - Flying Cloud is Princess Paw Paw's flying horse. Later in the series, she falls in love with the Black Stallion, with whom she has two foals.
- Brave Paw (voiced by Thom Pinto) is the Princess's closest friend. He is courageous and willing to rescue his fellow Paw Paws from danger and fight the forces of evil. Aside from the Princess, he is the only other Paw Paw who rides a flying horse.
  - Golden Thunder is Brave Paw's flying horse. Brave Paw can summon Golden Thunder from Thunder Mountain simply by calling his name.
- Mighty Paw (voiced by Robert Ridgely) is the biggest and strongest of the Paw Paws, although a bit slow.
- Laughing Paw (voiced by Alexandra Stoddart) is younger than the Princess and is known for her sense of humor.
  - PaPooch (vocal effects provided by Don Messick) is Laughing Paw's pet puppy. He is loyal and brave, but always gets into trouble. His name is play on the Narragansett term papoose.
- Trembly Paw (voiced by Howard Morris) is the coward of the tribe and would rather run from danger, although occasionally he would do heroic deeds.
- Medicine Paw (voiced by Jerry Dexter impersonating W. C. Fields) is the shaman of the tribe, but he is a bit of a quack.
- Totem Animals are the main protectors of the village. The Totem Animals can be awakened by the Mystic Moonstone wielded by Princess Paw Paw to fight off the Meanos.
  - Totem Eagle is a top Totem Animal and serves as the air transportation.
  - Totem Bear (vocal effects provided by Frank Welker) is the middle Totem Animal.
  - Totem Turtle is the bottom Totem Animal and its main function is water transportation.

=== Villains ===
- Meanos are the main antagonists of the series.
  - Dark Paw (voiced by Stanley Ralph Ross) is the chief of the Meanos. He carries around a magic staff which he typically uses to zap his enemies, as well as other Meanos when they get on his bad side.
  - Slippery Paw is better known for his greasy long hair than for his intelligence, but he is still smarter than Bumble Paw.
  - Bumble Paw (voiced by Frank Welker) is the shortest and dumbest of the group.
- Aunt Pruney (voiced by Ruth Buzzi) is Dark Paw's aunt and a witch who rides a vacuum cleaner instead of a broom. She complains to her nephew that he never calls or writes. Aunt Pruney is often disappointed at his constant failures and even helps him out. Aunt Pruney and Wise Paw knew each other personally.
- The Greedy Greenies are green slimy monsters seen in a few episodes. They are mostly featureless, except for a pair of eyes, and have voracious appetites. The Greenies live in a hidden underground complex near the Paw Paw village. Intruders are lowered into a pool of slime that will cover the victim and eventually assimilate it, transforming them into a Greenie. Even Dark Paw is afraid of them.
  - Great Greenie is the leader of the Greedy Greenies.

=== Other characters ===
- Eugene the Genie (voiced by Scatman Crothers) is a cat-like genie who is a friend of the Paw Paws. He has magic powers and a sassy attitude, especially towards Dark Paw.
- Nice Paw is a former Meano who used to be called Nasty Paw. He was abducted by aliens, who reprogrammed his mind and forced him into reforming. Nice Paw has since traveled with the aliens and often returns to Earth.

== Cast ==
- Susan Blu – Princess Paw Paw
- Ruth Buzzi – Aunt Pruney
- Scatman Crothers – Eugene the Genie
- Leo De Lyon –
- Jerry Dexter – Medicine Paw
- Laurie Faso –
- Pat Fraley –
- Billie Hayes –
- John Ingle – Wise Paw
- Tom Kratochvil –
- Mitzi McCall –
- Don Messick – PaPooch, additional voices
- Howard Morris – Trembly Paw
- Rob Paulsen –
- Thom Pinto – Brave Paw
- Robert Ridgely – Mighty Paw
- Neil Ross –
- Stanley Ralph Ross – Dark Paw
- Marilyn Schreffler –
- Alexandra Stoddart – Laughing Paw
- Frank Welker – Bumble Paw, Totem Bear, additional voices

== Episode list ==
No.	Title	Original release date
1	"The Big Spill"	September 15, 1985
While the Paw Paw bears take care of an injured duckling, the wicked Dark Paw and his Meanos cause a flood to steal the Princess's mystic moonstone.
2	"The Wishing Star Crystal"	September 22, 1985
When Princess Paw Paw is put into an eternal sleep by a magic flower, courtesy of Dark Paw, her friends must take a perilous journey to find a magic crystal to awaken her.
3	"The Flying Horse-Napper"	September 29, 1985
Dark Paw steals the Princess's magic whistle that allows her to summon Flying Cloud and plans to use the flying horse to get a potion from his Aunt Pruney on Shriek Peak.
4	"The Creepy Cave Creature"	October 6, 1985
After preventing the Paw Paws from calling Totem Bear, Dark Paw puts a large creature under his control to attack their village.
5	"The Greedie Greenies"	October 13, 1985
When green blobs descend on the village and eat everything in sight, the Paw Paws must come to the rescue of their worst enemy, Dark Paw.
6	"The Rise of the Evil Spirits"	October 20, 1985
When ancient spirits of evil awaken after 200 years to cause trouble for the Paw Paws, Dark Paw tries to gain control of them and finally take over the village.
7	"The Genie-athalon"	October 27, 1985
When Eugene the Genie's lamp is uncovered and everyone tries to claim it, the Paw Paws compete against the cheating Dark Paw to win his three wishes.
8	"The Golden Falcon"	November 3, 1985
When the Great Totem disappears and a mysterious golden falcon statue appears, Dark Paw takes the opportunity to challenge Brave Paw to a fight.
9	"Honey of a Robbery"	November 10, 1985
It is Wise Paw's 100th birthday and Dark Paw plans on ruining the celebration by stealing the village's entire honey supply.
10	"Tot 'em Termi' Nation"	November 17, 1985
Dark Paw brings the Black Stallion to lure away Flying Cloud and keep the Princess busy, so an army of termites can reduce the Great Totem to sawdust.
11	"Waif Goodbye to the Paw Paws"	November 24, 1985
Dark Paw's Aunt Pruney helps him to take over the Paw Paw's village by disguising herself as a young and pretty Paw Paw.
12	"The Dark Totem Pole Monster"	December 1, 1985
Dark Paw sets his sights on the moonstone around the neck of Totem Bear by building a giant mechanical version of himself, while Trembly Paw tries to help a young flying horse with a fear of flying.
13	"Dark Paw Under Wraps"	December 8, 1985
When a flood uncovers the casket of a Paw Paw mummy, Dark Paw takes advantage of an ancient curse to take over as leader.
14	"Genie Without a Lamp"	December 15, 1985
Eugene the Genie's lamp is stolen, and the Paw Paws must get it back from Dark Paw and later the Greedie Greenies before Eugene fades away.
15	"Egging Dark Paw On"	December 22, 1985
The Paw Paws try to build a balloon to rescue an egg, but Dark Paw gives them enchanted tools that do the opposite.
16	"Two Heads Are Better than One"	December 29, 1985
Aunt Pruney's two-headed security guards capture the princess after falling in love with her, and the Paw Paws must rescue her.
17	"The Great Paw Paw Turnaround"	January 5, 1986
During the election for the new leader of the Paw Paws, Dark Paw uses Nice Paw's "Reverseatron" to turn the Princess mean and cruel.
18	"The Lost Lake Monster"	January 12, 1986
The Meanos attempt to steal the Moonstone, but it falls in a lake monster's lair, and now the Paw Paws must go underwater to retrieve it.
19	"Totem Time Trip"	January 19, 1986
The Meanos travel back in time to stop Totem Bear from being built, but the Paw Paws follow in pursuit.
20	"S'no Business"	January 26, 1986
While sending food to snowbound animals, Dark Paw steals Totem Bear only for a snow monster to take him after mistaking him for another monster like himself.
21	"The Zip Zap 4-D Trap"	February 2, 1986
When Dark Paw loses his staff, Aunt Pruney disguises her toad as a dog to distract PaPooch so he can make a new staff from a tree in the Paw Paw village.

== Merchandise ==
A line of Paw Paws toys were produced by Applause in 1985. Princess Paw Paw, Brave Paw, Mighty Paw, Pupooch, Medicine Paw, the Meanos and other characters were produced as PVC figurines ranging from 2" to 3" tall. The figurines had accessories, like a canoe or a cart. Pupooch was also produced as a plush toy. These were only produced for a short time and are rare today.

== Home media ==
In 2019, Warner Archive released Paw Paws: The Complete Series on DVD in region 1 as part of their Hanna-Barbera Classic Collection.

== Reception ==
In 2014, listing Paw Paws among twelve 1980s cartoons that did not deserve remembrance, io9 characterized it as "kind of racist", due to the characters' stereotypes of Native Americans.
