= Top Cat =

American animated television series

- Genre: Animated sitcom
- Created by: William Hanna; Joseph Barbera
- Written by: Barry Blitzer; Harvey Bullock; Kin Platt
- Directed by: William Hanna; Joseph Barbera
- Voices of: Arnold Stang; Allen Jenkins; Maurice Gosfield; Leo De Lyon; Marvin Kaplan; John Stephenson
- Theme music composer: Hoyt Curtin
- Opening theme: "The Most Effectual Top Cat"
- Ending theme: "The Most Effectual Top Cat"
- Country of origin: United States
- Original language: English
- No. of seasons: 1
- No. of episodes: 30

Production
- Executive producers: Joe Ruby; Ken Spears
- Running time: 24–27 minutes
- Production company: Hanna-Barbera Productions

Original release
- Network: ABC
- Release: September 27, 1961 – April 18, 1962

Top Cat is an American animated sitcom produced by Hanna-Barbera Productions and originally broadcast in prime time on the ABC network. It aired in a weekly evening time slot from September 27, 1961, to April 18, 1962, for a single season of 30 episodes. The show was a ratings failure in prime time, but became successful when repeated on Saturday morning television. The show also became popular in Latin American countries, the United Kingdom and the South of Europe.

== Background ==
Top Cat was created as a parody of The Phil Silvers Show (1955–59), a successful military comedy whose lead character (Sergeant Bilko, played by Silvers) was a fast-talking con artist. Hanna-Barbera sold the cartoon to ABC based on a drawing of Top Cat. Arnold Stang's vocal characterization of the main character was originally based on an impression of Phil Silvers's voice. During the original network run, the sponsor objected to the Silvers' impersonation—insisting that it was paying for Stang, not Silvers—so in later episodes Stang modified his characterization, bringing it closer to his own voice, though still copying Silvers. Additionally, Maurice Gosfield, who played Private Duane Doberman in The Phil Silvers Show, provided the voice for Benny the Ball in Top Cat, and Benny's chubby appearance was based on Gosfield's. Top Cat and his gang were also inspired by the East Side Kids, roguish, street-smart characters from a series of 1940s B movies.

This was only the second original cartoon series to premiere on prime time network television in the United States. Top Cat was conceived along the lines of a traditional, live-action situation comedy, and Hanna-Barbera recruited top sitcom writers of the day to furnish scripts, including Barry Blitzer (a Phil Silvers Show veteran), Harvey Bullock, and Kin Platt.

== Premise ==
The title character, Top Cat (T.C.), is the leader of a gang of Manhattan alley cats living in Hoagy's Alley: Benny the Ball, Brain, Choo-Choo, Fancy-Fancy and Spook.

The gang constantly hatch get-rich-quick schemes through scams but they usually backfire, and a frequent plot thread revolves around the local police officer, Charles "Charlie" Dibble (voiced by Allen Jenkins), ineffectually trying to either arrest them, evict them from the alley, get them to clean the alley, or stop them using the police box phone.

Like The Flintstones, all the episodes feature a cold open, which is a small scene from the episode that takes place in medias res, and after that, a long flashback that leads to the scene begins with the series' theme song "The Most Effectual Top Cat" and features Top Cat's misadventures that happen before the scene from the beginning plays. The story then continues from where it left off. In some episodes, the flashback stops near the middle when the same scene plays.

== Broadcast ==
Top Cat aired on Wednesday nights in prime time at 8:30 pm. Hanna-Barbera created 30 half-hour episodes. The show was broadcast in black-and-white but was created in color. The show aired on Saturdays in 1962 and 1963 on ABC, and was then rerun (now in color) in various Saturday-morning slots on NBC from 1965 to 1969, and occasionally in the 1980s.

Reruns of the series aired on Cartoon Network from 1992 until 2004, and on Boomerang from 2000 to 2014 and again from November 26 to 29, 2020. Reruns later returned to Boomerang on April 4, 2023. The show began airing on MeTV Toons on June 29, 2024.

== Analysis ==
Animation historian Christopher P. Lehman says that the series can be seen as social commentary. The cats may represent disenfranchised people confined to living in a poor environment. Top Cats' get-rich-quick schemes are efforts to escape to a better life. The gang faces a human police officer who frustrates their efforts and keeps them trapped in the alley. This enforcement of the social order by police ensures, says Lehman, that the cats will not escape their current living conditions.

Co-creator Bill Hanna said it was one of the wittiest and most sophisticated shows he produced, with a rare appeal to audiences of all ages.

== Characters ==
Top Cat and the gang (left to right): Benny the Ball (foreground); Brain; Officer Dibble (behind fence); Fancy-Fancy; Top Cat; Spook (foreground); Choo-Choo

=== Main characters ===
- Top Cat (voiced by Arnold Stang imitating Phil Silvers) is a yellow cat with a purple hat and vest who is the leader of the gang and titular character of the series. He is a clever, smooth-talking con-artist who is always hatching get-rich-quick schemes.
- Benny the Ball (voiced by Maurice Gosfield) is a blue cat with a white sports jacket who is Top Cat's sidekick and right-paw cat who often falls into and assists with his schemes, but is innocent and kind-hearted and is willing to help anyone.
- Choo-Choo (voiced by Marvin Kaplan) is a pink cat with a white turtleneck sweater who is Top Cat's voice of reason. He has a nervous personality and speaks with a thick Brooklyn accent, and gets anxious when it comes to dating mates, but he usually has a caring attitude. He is often referred to as "Chooch" by the other members.
- Brain (voiced by Leo De Lyon) is an orange cat with a purple shirt with a black band on the bottom who, despite his sarcastic name, is the slow, dim-witted member of Top Cat's gang, usually not understanding the tasks given to him and failing to keep secrets. Despite this, he is a loyal member of Top Cat's gang and is helpful to the other cats.
- Spook (voiced by Leo De Lyon) is an olive-green cat with a black tie who is a member of Top Cat's gang. He speaks with a stereotypical 1960's beatnik slang (using terms including "like"), but in the theatrical movies, he speaks like a surfer. He has a laid-back attitude and a music appreciation.
- Fancy-Fancy (voiced by John Stephenson) is a brown cat with a white scarf who is a member of Top Cat's gang. Like Spook, he has a laid-back personality, but unlike Choo-Choo, he has a romantic knack for mates and is often seen flirting with them, until Top Cat calls for him. Despite his name, the word Fancy can sometimes be said once or twice.
- Officer "Charlie" Dibble (voiced by Allen Jenkins) is a strict but well-meaning police officer who is usually the target of Top Cat's schemes, and always patrols the alley to keep a watchful eye on Top Cat and his gang, especially when it comes to using the police phone located on a pole in the alley.

Additional voices:

- Bea Benaderet
- Herschel Bernardi
- Daws Butler
- Walker Edmiston
- Paul Frees
- Sallie Janes
- Don Messick
- Ge Ge Pearson
- Hal Smith
- Jean Vander Pyl
- Herb Vigran

== Episodes ==
=== Series overview ===
Season	Episodes	Originally released	
Season	Episodes	First released	Last released
1	30	September 27, 1961	April 25, 1962

No.	Title	Original release date	Prod. code	US households (in millions)
1	"The $1,000,000 Derby"	September 27, 1961	T–4	7.55
Benny gets a new pet, a devoted, camera-loving horse. Top Cat tries everything to get rid of the horse after it incurs a million-dollar debt, but changes his mind when he sees the horse's shock-induced superior racing abilities.
2	"The Missing Heir"	October 4, 1961	T–6	8.25
Benny is a double for "Catwallader", the missing heir to a millionaire's fortune, the identification being clinched by a supposed birthmark on the sole of Benny's foot. Top Cat and the gang get Benny to the mansion in time to claim the money, but this is bad news for the scheming butler Chutney (voiced by Paul Frees) and dog Griswold (voiced by Don Messick) who hoped to claim the fortune for themselves. After a few failed attempts to kill Benny, Chutney and Griswold are arrested by Officer Dibble, who recognizes Chutney as a wanted criminal. The lawyer appears with the real Catwallader, while Top Cat gets shocked to see that Benny's "birthmark" was chewing gum all along. The next day, Catwallader visits the gang and asks to join them -- after Top Cat discovers that Catwallader gave his whole fortune away.
3	"Hawaii – Here We Come"	October 11, 1961	T–1	N/A
Benny wins a trip to Hawaii. Top Cat and the gang join him on his trip as stowaways. Things take a drastic turn as Officer Dibble also ends up aboard the ship, and the discovery of a suitcase containing counterfeit money leads to Top Cat and the gang being thrown into the brig as suspected counterfeiters. However, with Top Cat's assistance, Officer Dibble is able to catch the real counterfeiter and prove the gang's innocence.
4	"Top Cat Falls in Love"	October 18, 1961	T–7	7.46
While visiting tonsillectomy patient Benny in the hospital, Top Cat falls for the pretty cat nurse Miss LaRue (voiced by Jean Vander Pyl). T.C. decides to attract her attention by pretending to come down with a rare illness, which will need a lot of nursing care.
5	"The Violin Player"	October 25, 1961	T–5	6.66
Mr. Gutenbad (voiced by John Stephenson), the musical director of Carnegie Hall, mistakes a recording of violin virtuoso Laszlo Laszlo for the playing of Benny the Ball, who has just taken up the instrument. He approaches Benny with an offer to perform and Top Cat negotiates a deal for $50,000 for a Saturday night performance at the Hall—an offer that is withdrawn when Carnegie's Board of Directors really hear Benny play. When Gutenbad offers a $10,000 reward to find the true violinist, the gang discovers that their neighborhood street cleaner is in fact Laszlo Laszlo (voiced by Leo De Lyon).
6	"The Unscratchables"	November 1, 1961	T–12	3.56 (Note: In the Nielsen Ratings pocketpiece listings, it is called a "Bell&HowellClose-Up" instead of "Top Cat," as that is what was the episode's sponsor during its premiere. On all schedule listings, it is still called "Top Cat.")
When a stolen diamond ends up in Benny the Ball's stomach, it is up to Top Cat and the gang to find a way to retrieve him from Big Gus and his band of gangsters, who have kidnapped him and are attempting to retrieve the diamond the hard way.
7	"All That Jazz"	November 8, 1961	T–3	6.94
Jazz (voiced by Daws Butler impersonating Jack Oakie), the new cat in town (known as "A.T." – All That), takes over the pool hall, steals Top Cat's girlfriend, sways the gang, and cleans up the alley. This sparks a contest between the pair. However, when both Jazz and Top Cat are offered a part in a Hollywood film, they assume that it is another trick. The offer turns out to be legitimate and Benny is cast in the starring role in The Thing from the Alley. He leaves for Hollywood in a limousine, accompanied by Top Cat and the gang in the guise of Benny's manager, valet, vocal coach, tailor, and chauffeur. After that, Officer Dibble catches Jazz using the police phone, now declaring that Jazz "is just as bad as Top Cat". Jazz and his buddy Beau (voiced by Don Messick) are forced by Officer Dibble to keep the alley clean for 30 days.
8	"Choo-Choo's Romance"	November 15, 1961	T–11	7.69
Choo-Choo has fallen in love with a beautiful French cat named Goldie (voiced by Jean Vander Pyl); Top Cat and the gang help Choo-Choo to court her, but they hadn't figured on Goldie's jealous boyfriend Pierre (voiced by John Stephenson).
9	"A Visit from Mother"	November 22, 1961	T–8	7.08
Benny has written to his mother that he's the mayor of New York. Now Benny's mother is coming for a visit, and Top Cat and the gang must do everything they can to convince Mrs. Ball (voiced by Bea Benaderet) that her son really is the mayor.
10	"Rafeefleas"	November 29, 1961	T–13	N/A
After Benny spends the night sleeping inside a museum, T.C. discovers a scarab attached to his back. The jewel is later found to be an expensive antique, and the gang attempts to return it. Once the scarab is returned, a jewel thief arrives and takes a number of jewels. Officer Dibble arrives and mistakes T.C. as the thief; however, the real thief is caught when he runs into the rest of the gang. Fred Flintstone and Barney Rubble from The Flintstones make cameo appearances as prehistoric statues at the museum.
11	"Sergeant Top Cat" "Sgt. Top Cat"	December 6, 1961	T–10	7.22
After overhearing Officer Dibble suggesting ways to improve conditions for the police force, Top Cat passes off Dibble's ideas to the chief of police as his own. This leads to Top Cat's being made an honorary police sergeant and Dibble's boss in the alley.
12	"Naked Town"	December 20, 1961	T–9	7.18
"Naked Town," (a TV crime show parodying the real–life series "Naked City") will be shooting a warehouse robbery scene in Top Cat's alley. Officer Dibble offers his cooperation, but is unaware that some crooks will be using the TV filming as a cover for a real robbery.
13	"The Maharajah of Pookajee"	December 27, 1961	T–2	6.19
Top Cat impersonates the Maharajah of Pookajee and lives the good life at a swank hotel with his cronies... until a pair of gangsters show up.
14	"The Long Hot Winter"	January 3, 1962	T–15	6.91
During a cold winter in the alley, Top Cat and the gang scheme to find a way into Officer Dibble's house in an attempt to keep warm. Once inside the house, Dibble struggles to live with the gang. In the end, the gang stays for several months until spring and the warmer weather arrive.
15	"The Tycoon"	January 10, 1962	T–14	7.94
A tycoon (voiced by Don Messick) decides to give away $1 million to the most unfortunate person he finds, which ends up being Top Cat. He gives the check to Benny, who tries to show it to Top Cat (who mistakenly believes it is for 25 cents due to his latest hustle), so he tries to cash it himself. A merchant overhears him and tells all his associates. Everybody gives things to Top Cat thinking he is a millionaire and that he will pay them back.
16	"The Grand Tour"	January 17, 1962	T–19	6.96
Top Cat and the gang are struggling to make money. However, T.C. comes up with a new get-rich-quick scheme which involves creating a fake "historical" tour of New York. Choo-Choo begins selling "phony" maps. However, it is later found that the maps point to a real treasure in a dilapidated house.
17	"Space Monkey"	January 24, 1962	T–21	7.06
Officer Dibble takes a job at Cape Canaveral, and the gang discover about the luxurious treatment a chimpanzee (voiced by John Stephenson) receives while in the space program. Top Cat and his gang join up in attempt to access the same luxurious facilities, but they want out when they discover they will be going into space.
18	"T.C. Minds the Baby"	January 31, 1962	T–17	7.69
An abandoned baby (voiced by Jean Vander Pyl) is found by Top Cat and the gang who intend on looking after it after finding a note from its desperate mother. However, they find parenthood much more difficult than they thought it to be. When Officer Dibble catches onto them, he is shown the note left with the baby and takes it into police custody. In the end, Officer Dibble tells Top Cat's group that the mother is found and the baby is safely returned, while seeing that something like this never happens again.
19	"The Golden Fleecing"	February 7, 1962	T–20	7.74
Benny receives an insurance payment of $2,000, giving T.C. ideas about how to spend it. The first spree is at a local nightclub, where Benny falls in love with showgirl Honeydew Mellon (voiced by Sallie Janes). She's in league with poker-playing con artists, who will do everything they can to separate Benny from his money.
20	"The Case of the Absent Anteater"	February 14, 1962	T–16	8.28
Benny gets a new pet; a hungry, brown giant anteater which followed him into the alley. Top Cat attempts to get rid of the animal until it is revealed that the anteater had escaped from the zoo and a large reward is offered for its return.
21	"Farewell, Mr. Dibble"	February 21, 1962	T–18	8.04
Officer Dibble is replaced by a new recruit named Ernest Prowler (voiced by Don Messick). Prowler intends to be more forceful in his duty than Dibble and intends to stop the trouble that Top Cat and the gang cause. Due to the new regime, the gang hatches a plan to have Dibble return to his old beat in the alley.
22	"The Late T.C."	February 28, 1962	T–22	8.43
While the gang is watching a baseball game at Yankee Stadium, Top Cat ends up being hit by a home run, causing him to fall off the fence. Choo-Choo stays behind while the others take T.C. to the doctor (with Benny making, according to T.C., the "worst siren [noise] I've ever heard!"). Officer Dibble comes along and asks Choo-Choo what happened. Dibble follows T.C. to make sure he doesn't cheat the doctor. T.C. is diagnosed with only a bump on the head, but when paying the doctor's fee he offers his pocket clock, which was broken when he fell off the fence. The doctor tells him, "Your ticker will only last a week." Dibble, overhearing, mistakes the "ticker" for Top Cat's heart and thinks he will soon "conk out". After realizing the misunderstanding, T.C. takes advantage of the situation and Dibble helps him – that is, until Dibble invites the doctor to T.C.'s going-away party and finds out!
23	"Choo-Choo Goes Ga-Ga"	March 7, 1962	T–24	7.69
Choo-Choo threatens to kill himself unless he can get a date with a Hollywood movie star named Lola Glamour (voiced by Jean Vander Pyl). Top Cat tries getting him that date by visiting her at her penthouse, but Officer Dibble gets complaints from other people who live there. Top Cat soon finds out Lola will only date rich men, so Choo-Choo once again tries to commit suicide. This annoys Top Cat, so he tries to get Lola to think Choo-Choo is a rich count named Count Chooch.
24	"King for a Day"	March 14, 1962	T–25	6.32
After Top Cat upsets Officer Dibble one time too many, he and the gang decide to lie low for a while. After spending the night in a department store, the gang go on the "King for a Day" show which offers a number of prizes, after writing to the show's producers about the gang being a "poor family". Instead, Dibble wins the prizes and offers to take T.C. and the gang for a ride to show no hard feelings.
25	"Dibble Breaks the Record"	March 21, 1962	T–27	6.37
Officer Dibble attempts to break a record as the longest-serving police officer on the beat, which had been set years ago by his idol, policeman "Iron Man" Muldoon (voiced by Paul Frees); if he beats the record, he wins a vacation that would allow him to escape the gang for a while. With this information, Top Cat does everything he can to help Dibble win, and has the gang watch over him so he doesn't have an accident.
26	"The Con Men"	March 28, 1962	T–26	7.45
A friendly hot dog vendor (voiced by Paul Frees) is swindled out of $1,000 by con men who pretended to have an oil well in Nova Scotia. Top Cat disguises himself as a wealthy Texan in an attempt to get the money back, by convincing the crooks that the oil well really does exist.
27	"Dibble's Birthday"	April 4, 1962	T–23	7.30
Officer Dibble's birthday is coming up and he thinks he's getting too old. To help cheer him up, the gang decide to throw him a birthday party, with gifts from everybody in the neighborhood.
28	"Dibble Sings Again"	April 11, 1962	T–28	6.76
Top Cat owes money to loan shark Big Gus. After hearing Officer Dibble singing, he convinces him that under his management, he could become a big singing star.
29	"Griswald"	April 18, 1962	T–29	7.15
Officer Dibble gets a new partner on the beat: the dog Griswald. Top Cat and the gang attempt to outwit him, but the dog always seems to be one step ahead. T.C. gets the dog removed from duty after he bites the police sergeant and the police commissioner (voiced by Don Messick).
30	"Dibble's Double"	April 25, 1962	T–30	N/A
A thief named Al the Actor (voiced by Don Messick) disguises as Officer Dibble to steal a fortune from an art gallery. After seeing how much can be paid for artworks, Top Cat has also taken up painting, but discovers his own artwork was also stolen. The gang and Dibble team up to catch the thief.

== Home media ==
Episodes of the series were released on VHS in Europe, as well as Worldvision Home Video in the United States.

The series' episode, "All That Jazz", was edited into a 7-minute preview as part of the "A Sample of Boomerang" tape, from Cartoon Network's sister channel, Boomerang.

Episodes of the series were also released on Laserdisc in the United Kingdom by Guild Home Video, as well as Image Entertainment in the United States.

Warner Home Video released the complete series on DVD on December 7, 2004. It was re-released on January 10, 2017, albeit as a manufacture-on-demand (MOD) release via the Warner Archive. On June 6 of that year, Top Cat was re-released in stores again, albeit with all bonus features removed.

Home media releases for Top Cat
DVD name	No. ep	Release date	Additional information
Top Cat – The Complete Series	30	December 7, 2004; January 10, 2017 (re-release)	Commentary on various episodes; Back to Hoagy's Alley: The Making of Top Cat (retrospective featurette); Interviews: Cool Cats in Interview Alley; Top Cat sing-along; Production Sketches: Top Cat Collection (art, stills, sketches, backgrounds); Storyboards: Storyboard Showcase; TV Spot: Top Cat Kellogg's commercials (US release only)

In the UK, the complete series box set was released in 2007, initially as a HMV exclusive until 2008. Alternatively, five single DVD volumes, each containing 6 episodes, were released. The covers were originally from the US edition but later re-released with a new design. Each volume shows a group picture of Top Cat using Dibble's phone with his gang beside him, but the colour-coding is:

- Volume 1: Primrose (episodes 1–6) – Top Cat
- Volume 2: Green (episodes 7–12) – Choo-Choo
- Volume 3: Red (episodes 13–18) – Fancy Fancy
- Volume 4: Blue (episodes 19–24) – Benny
- Volume 5: Orange (episodes 25–30) – Spook

The DVDs have since been made available for purchase from other retailers across the UK.

Warner Archive released the complete series on Blu-ray on September 17, 2024.

== In other media ==
=== Comic books ===
The gang's adventures continued off-screen in comic books as Dell (which became Gold Key) published 31 issues from 1961 to 1970. Charlton Comics published 20 more issues from 1970 to 1973. In Mexico, Ediciones Latinoamericanas' "La Colección Primavera" featured Don Gato in 1968.

In the UK, a comic-book series called Top Cat's TV Comic Show was published by Marvel UK from 1983 through 1984, under license from Hanna-Barbera.

In 2012, there was a crossover between Top Cat and Chilean comic book character Condorito.

Top Cat had a backup story in Adam Strange/Future Quest Annual #1 in where he escapes from prison and meets Batman through a cosmic portal. Unlike the cartoon, Top Cat is from a world where cats are the dominant species. As a follow-up, Top Cat also appears in one issue of a crossover series between DC and Hanna-Barbera, titled Superman/Top Cat Special (October 2018).

=== Books ===
Little Golden Books and Durabooks have both produced hardcover children's books starring Top Cat. In the UK, World Distributors published annuals during the 1960s sourced from the Dell comics strips. BrownWatson later published a 1978 annual entitled The Great Grape Ape and Boss Cat.

=== View-Master ===
T.C. and friends appeared on three View-Master reels in 1962. These were titled "Medal for Meddling", "Zoo-Operation", and "No Cat Fishing".

=== Music ===
The Original TV Soundtrack, written and recorded by Hoyt Curtin, was released by Colpix Records in 1962, consisting of slightly edited versions of "The Unscratchables" and "Top Cat Falls in Love". Hanna-Barbera Records released an LP in 1965 titled Robin Hood Starring Top Cat. T.C. and the gang were pictured as Merry Men on the cover. Its songs included "Top Cat", "M-O-N-E-Y", "Dibble", "Robin Hood", and "Buddies". It was re-released in 1977 on Columbia Records' Special Products label. A jazzy arrangement of the Top Cat theme can be heard most weeks over the end credits of Bob Dylan's Theme Time Radio Hour.

The titles and underscore were released as part of the CD release, The Best of Hanna-Barbera: Tunes from the Toons by Music Club in 2002 in Europe.

== Top Cat's cameos ==
- In "King for a Day", The Brain and Spook are reading comic books. At the right and at the bottom there is a Yogi Bear comic and a Huckleberry Hound comic.
- In "Rafeefleas", the gang is wandering through a museum at night when they come upon a group of statues labeled "Prehistoric Man". Choo-Choo insists that he's seen the figures before, maybe on TV, but TC waves this off. The statues are modeled after Fred Flintstone and Barney Rubble.
- In "A Visit from Mother", graffiti of "El Kabong", Quick Draw McGraw's alter-ego, is seen on the wall in the background.

=== Top Cat's appearance in other shows ===
- Top Cat's theme is featured in The Flintstones episode "Surfin Fred" when Barney and Betty discover that Jimmy Darrock is in fact not a lifeguard.
- Officer Dibble makes a cameo appearance in The Flintstones episode "Time Machine" as a policeman in the future. Thus returning the favor done in the episode "Rafeefleas" when T.C and the gang found two statues of cavemen (Fred and Barney) in an art museum, while searching for the jewelry display case.
- Top Cat and his gang appeared in Yogi's Ark Lark. While the others don't have dialogue, Top Cat was voiced by Daws Butler and Benny the Ball was voice by John Stephenson. It was presumed that Arnold Stang wasn't available at the time, while Maurice Gosfield died in 1964.
- In 1985, Top Cat appeared on Yogi's Treasure Hunt with Yogi Bear and other Hanna-Barbera toon stars; he was the one who assigned the treasure hunts. Officer Dibble also made an appearance in the end of the show's episode, "Yogi and the Beanstalk" voiced by John Stephenson.
- In 1987, Hanna-Barbera produced a feature-length television film based on the show titled Top Cat and the Beverly Hills Cats (part of the Hanna-Barbera Superstars 10 film series), in which the gang helps a teenager claim her inheritance. During that time, John Stephenson reprised Officer Dibble while Benny the Ball was voiced by Avery Schreiber.
- In the Fender Bender 500 segment of Wake, Rattle, and Roll, Top Cat and Choo Choo were racers driving a trash can-modeled monster truck called the Alley Cat.
- In the Duck Dodgers episode "K-9 Quarry", Top Cat was amongst the poached characters on the Alien Hunter's ship.
- Top Cat and his gang appeared in the Harvey Birdman, Attorney at Law episode "Mindless" with Top Cat and Choo Choo voiced by Tom Kenny, Benny the Ball voiced by Maurice LaMarche, and Fancy-Fancy voiced by Chris Edgerly. Brain has no dialogue and Spook is nowhere to be seen. In that episode, Harvey Birdman takes Top Cat and his gang home. Top Cat gets sued for bookmaking and running an illegal gambling service out of Harvey's home. He is found guilty and is sentenced to probation.
- Top Cat, Benny and Brain made a cameo appearance at the end of The Powerpuff Girls episode "Catastrophe". They can be seen at the bottom left corner of the screen (Note: Instead of his hat, Top Cat has a splat of slime on his head).
- Top Cat was seen briefly driving a motorcycle in the Foster's Home for Imaginary Friends episode "Cheese a go-go".
- In the Futurama episode "That Darn Katz!" a picture of Top Cat is seen.
- Top Cat, Benny, and the rest of the alley cats appeared in the HBO Max original series Jellystone! Choo-Choo, Spook and Brain are females in this series. Spook is also renamed as Spooky and she is completely mute. Top Cat was voiced by Thomas Lennon, Choo-Choo and Spooky were voiced by Jenny Lorenzo, Fancy-Fancy was voiced by Andrew Frankel, Brain was voiced by Georgie Kidder and Benny was voiced by show creator C.H. Greenblatt.
- Top Cat made a cameo appearance in Teen Titans Go! episode "Warner Bros. 100th Anniversary".

=== Top Cat's appearances in comic strips ===
- Top Cat and his gang (except for Brain) appeared in the March 10, 2016, strip of Heathcliff.

== Television movies and specials ==
- Top Cat and the Beverly Hills Cats (1988)
- Hanna-Barbera's 50th: A Yabba Dabba Doo Celebration (1989)

== Theatrical films ==
The series has spawned two theatrical films produced by Mexican animation studio, Ánima Estudios. Both films have grossed a combined total of $19.3 million (MX$166.35 million pesos).

- Top Cat: The Movie (2011)
- Top Cat Begins (2015)

=== Box office ===
Title	Year	Box-office (USD)	Box-office (MXN)
Top Cat: The Movie	2011	$14.7 million	$112.25 million
Top Cat Begins	2015	$4.6 million	$54.1 million
Combined total		$19.3 million	$166.35 million

== International broadcast ==
=== Australia ===
The show premiered on the Seven Network on September 27, 1961

=== Canada ===
Top Cat premiered on the CTV Television Network on October 9, 1961.

=== Hungary ===
Top Cat (Turpi úrfi) was one of the first American cartoons premiered on Hungarian television channels in 1969. It also broadcast later with The Huckleberry Hound Show, Tom and Jerry, Looney Tunes, The Flintstones and The Jetsons on Magyar Televízió from 1985 to 1990, and tv2 from 1997 to 1999 (together with Wacky Races, Scooby-Doo, Where Are You! and Scooby-Doo and Scrappy-Doo). Boomerang began broadcasting it in Hungarian in 2013 (the show had a one-off airing the year before as part of a cats-themed block).

=== Latin America ===
The show was dubbed to Spanish in Mexico in 1963, using some of the same voice actors who worked in The Flintstones. It was renamed Don Gato y su pandilla (literally Mr. Cat and his gang) and the main characters adopted different accents. The voice acting improved the show, adding new jokes and local references.

In spite of the modest success of the show in the United States, the show was a massive hit in Mexico, Chile, Peru, Venezuela and Argentina, where it is recognized as one of the most famous Hanna Barbera characters ever.

Besides Top Cat, all the other characters from the show were famous, and their popularity is commonly attributed by the excellent dubbing and voice acting:

- Benny was renamed Benito B. Bodoque y B. and given a more childlike voice than was the case in the original dubbing.
- Choo Choo was renamed Cucho and spoke with a Yucatecan accent.
- Fancy-Fancy was Panza (belly).
- Spook renamed as the word's rough translation Espanto.
- Brain was called Demóstenes (honouring the Greek statesman Demosthenes, with whom he shares a speech impediment).
- Officer Charlie Dibble renamed as Oficial Carlos "Carlitos" Matute.

The adaptation and translation was made by Rubén Arvizu. The main voice actors were Julio Lucena (voice of Top Cat), Jorge Arvizu (voice of Benny and Choo Choo), Víctor Alcocer (voice of Dibble), and David Reynoso, among others. Top Cat is still rerun every few years.

In Brazil, the character is known as Manda-Chuva (Brazilian Portuguese for big shot) and was voiced by actor Lima Duarte. The dub premiered in 1963 on TV Record in São Paulo and other stations in other cities. The series was later syndicated and was aired in the late 80s on TV Globo as part of Xou da Xuxa. In addition, the city of New York was replaced by Brasília (federal capital) in the Brazilian version most of the time.

=== India ===
Top Cat was one of the early favorites on Cartoon Network. It was aired in India in the 1990s. Top Cat was aired again in 2003 until 2004.

=== Japan ===
Top Cat (Japanese: ドラ猫大将) first aired on TV Asahi back in 1963 under the title translating to Stray Cat Boss. It was then rebroadcast many times over the years. In 1990, A new dub was produced for VHS sold by Nippon Columbia and released under its original name in Katakana (トップキャット). This new dub was also carried over to airing on Cartoon Network Japan since its launch in 1997.

=== Sri Lanka ===
Top Cat (Sinhala: Pissu Poosa (පිස්සු පූසා) literally Crazy Cat) was one of the most popular cartoon shows in Sri Lanka early 1980s and it has been repeated several times on the national television channel "Rupavahini". The series is dubbed in Sinhala and directed by Titus Thotawatte.

=== United Kingdom ===
"Top Cat" premiered on the BBC Television Service (now BBC One) on May 16, 1962, under its original name but after only four weeks was renamed The Boss Cat on June 13, 1962. This was shortened on February 22, 1967, to Boss Cat. This rapid name change was made because Top Cat was also the name of a then-popular British brand of cat food, and the cartoon was aired on the BBC which does not carry advertising. The dialogue and theme tune still referred to the character by his original name.

Despite the show being renamed Boss Cat, the character's name was unchanged as Top Cat or the initials "TC". The Boss Cat title card was last used for a repeat run in summer 1989. In 1999, when the series was re-purchased, the original US title sequence was used in full.

In 2016, the characters from the show (all the cats and Officer Dibble) were used as part of a set of television commercials for the British bank Halifax.

=== Name in different languages ===
- Brazilian Portuguese: Manda-Chuva (voice by Lima Duarte)
- English: Boss Cat
- Bulgarian: Топ Кет (Top Ket)
- Canadian French: Top chatons
- Czech: Kočičí banda
- Danish: Top Kat
- Dutch: Top Kat
- American English: Top Cat
- Finnish: Topi-katti ("Topi" does not mean 'Top', but is a Finnish nickname like "Tommy")
- French: Pacha
- German: Superkater
- Hungarian: Turpi úrfi (Lord Trick) in the series and Főmacsek (Main Cat) in the special.
- Italian: Top Cat (Temistocle)
- Japanese: Doraneko Taishō (ドラ猫大将) (lit. 'Stray Cat Boss')
- Macedonian: Тошо Мачорот (Tosho Machorot)
- Norwegian: Top Katt
- Persian: گربه استثنائی / داش پیشی / پیشی خان
- Polish: Kocia Ferajna (lit. 'Catfellas') and earlier translation Kot Tip Top (lit. 'Tip Top Cat')
- Portuguese: similar to Brazilian
- Romanian: Super Motanul (The Super-Cat)
- Russian: ГлавКот
- Serbian: Mika Mačor
- Sinhala: Pissu Poosa (පිස්සු පූසා)
- Spanish: Don Gato y su pandilla (Mr. Cat and his gang)
- Swedish: Top Cat (voice by Per Sandborgh)

== See also ==
- List of works produced by Hanna-Barbera Productions
- List of Hanna-Barbera characters
- Top Cat and the Beverly Hills Cats
- Yogi's Treasure Hunt
- Jellystone!
