= Top Cat (brand) =

British cat food brand

Top Cat was a British cat food brand that was made by Spillers. It is notable for being the cause of the renaming of the Hanna-Barbera animated television series Top Cat to Boss Cat in the United Kingdom in 1962, so as not to cause confusion or to suggest promotion or defamation. These concerns disappeared when the brand name was discontinued in the 1990s, allowing the original American title sequence to be used on the animated series, and any future media based on the franchise to use the name.
