= Raymond Parker =

Raymond or Ray Parker may refer to:

- Raymond Parker (canoeist) (1919–2009), British sprint canoer
- Buddy Parker (Raymond Klein Parker, 1913–1982), American football player and coach
- Ray Parker Jr. (born 1954), American guitarist, songwriter, producer and recording artist
- Ray Parker (painter) (1922–1990), American painter
- Ray Parker (footballer) (1925–2006), English footballer
