= Barry Blitzer =

American screenwriter (1929–2010)

- Born: April 21, 1929; New York City, U.S.
- Died: January 27, 2010 (aged 80); Santa Monica, California, U.S.
- Occupation: Television writer
- Spouse: Elsie Blitzer

Barry E. Blitzer (April 21, 1929 – January 27, 2010) was an American television writer.

== Life and career ==
Blitzer was well-known as a writer for Hanna-Barbera cartoons, including The Flintstones, Top Cat, and The Jetsons.

Listed as the last surviving member of a group of writers that won a 1956 Best Comedy Writing Emmy, the award was given for his work on the show The Phil Silvers Show and the episode was "You’ll Never Get Rich".

He worked on 1960s comedy series Get Smart and the 1970s children's TV show Land of the Lost along with writing stints on The Love Boat, Too Close for Comfort, McHale's Navy and Good Times.

== Honors ==
Blitzer was part of a group of writers that won a 1956 Primetime Emmy Award for Best Comedy Writing. He also was nominated for a Writers Guild award for his work on Get Smart.

== Death ==
Blitzer died on January 27, 2010, at the age of 80 from complications after abdominal surgery.
