= Korth (surname) =

Korth is a German language surname. It stems from a reduced form of the male given name Konrad and may refer to:

- Fred Korth (1909–1998), 56th U.S. Secretary of the Navy
- Heimo Korth, American outdoorsman
- Kathleen Korth (born 1952), American film editor
- Penne Percy Korth (born 1942), American diplomat
