= Heimo =

Heimo is a German and Finnish male given name. Notable people with this name include:

- Heimo (bishop of Vác), Hungarian prelate
- Heimo of Bamberg (died 1139), German chronologist
- Heimo Erbse (1924–2005), German composer
- Heimo Haitto (1925–1999), Finnish-American violinist
- Heimo Hecht (born 1961), Austrian sailor
- Heimo Korth, American outdoorsman
- Heimo Kump (born 1968), Austrian football player
- Heimo Linna (1925–2022), Finnish farmer and politician
- Heimo Müllneritsch (born 1947), Austrian slalom canoeist
- Heimo Pfeifenberger (born 1966), Austrian football player
- Heimo Reinitzer (born 1943), Austrian athlete
- Heimo Rekonen (1920–1997), Finnish politician
- Heimo Schwilk (born 1952), German journalist and writer
- Heimo Taskinen, Finnish ski-orienteering competitor
- Heimo Vorderegger (born 1966), Austrian football player
- Heimo Zobernig (born 1958), Austrian artist

== See also ==
- Haimo, name also spelled Heimo
- Heimo (company), German producer of handpainted toy figurines and accessories
