= Baby Shark's Big Show! =

Animated children's television series

- Hangul: 아기상어: 올리와 윌리엄
- RR: Agisangeo: Olriwa Wilrieom
- MR: Agisangŏ: Olliwa Williŏm
- Genre: Children's television series Comedy; Musical
- Based on: Pinkfong's "Baby Shark"
- Developed by: Whitney Ralls; Gary "Doodles" DiRaffaele; Tommy Sica
- Voices of: Kimiko Glenn; Luke Youngblood; Natasha Rothwell; Eric Edelstein; Debra Wilson; Patrick Warburton
- Opening theme: "Baby Shark's Big Show! Theme Song" (sung to "Baby Shark")
- Ending theme: "Baby Shark's Big Show Credits Song" (sung to "Baby Shark")
- Composer: Tommy Sica
- Countries of origin: United States South Korea
- Original languages: English; Korean
- No. of seasons: 3
- No. of episodes: 92

Production
- Executive producers: Gary "Doodles" DiRaffaele; Tommy Sica; Whitney Ralls; Kim Min-seok; Lee Ryan Seung-kyu; Bin Jeong
- Producer: Whitney Ralls
- Running time: 11 minutes (regular); 21–22 minutes (specials); 3 minutes (shorts)
- Production companies: Pinkfong; Nickelodeon Animation Studio

Original release
- Network: Nickelodeon (2020–23); Nick Jr. Channel (2023–25)
- Release: December 11, 2020 – January 14, 2025

Baby Shark's Big Show! is an animated television series based on the "Baby Shark" brand from The Pinkfong Company. Nickelodeon Animation Studio co-produces the show with Pinkfong.

In South Korea, Baby Shark's Big Show! debuted on the Educational Broadcasting System (EBS) with a Christmas special on December 25, 2020. From September 2021 onward, the series airs regularly on EBS1 on Wednesdays and Thursdays. In the United States, it premiered on Nickelodeon on December 11, 2020.

== Plot ==
In the underwater town of Carnivore Cove, Baby Shark has different musical adventures with his best friend William, his other friends (Chucks, Vola, Hank, and Goldie), and his family: Mommy Shark (a pink shark who loves to solve puzzles), Daddy Shark (a blue shark who's a dentist), Grandma Shark (an orange shark who bakes sweets), and Grandpa Shark (a green shark who loves watching TV).

== Characters ==
=== Main ===
- Baby Shark (voiced by Kimiko Glenn) is a yellow anthropomorphic shark and the main protagonist. Most episodes focus on him and his family: Mommy, Daddy, Grandma, and Grandpa Shark.
- William Manta (voiced by Luke Youngblood) is an orange pilot fish. He's Baby Shark's buddy and best friend.
- Mommy Shark (voiced by Natasha Rothwell) is a pink shark who is hardworking and likes to solves puzzles.
- Daddy Shark (voiced by Eric Edelstein) is a blue shark who's a dentist. He's also loud.
- Grandma Shark (voiced by Debra Wilson) is an orange shark who loves to bake. Her nose isn't fooled as she also has a prankster side.
- Grandpa Shark (voiced by Patrick Warburton) is a green shark who likes watching TV.

=== Supporting ===
- Chucks (voiced by Alex Cazares) is a purple male seahorse who is incredibly clumsy. The episodes "Snowball Bonanza", "Flow Bros", "Fishtival of Lights", "The Freeze Out", "Fishy Scouts", "Do or Diary", "The Musical Mystery", and "The Nickname King" focus on him.
  - Ezra (voiced by TBA in Korean and Robbie Daymond in English) is Chucks' seahorse father.
  - Anya (voiced by TBA in Korean and Georgia King in English) is Chucks' fishy stepmother.
  - Maddie (voiced by TBA in Korean and Sirena Irwin in English) is Chucks' older fishy stepsister.
    - Daphne (voiced by TBA in Korean and Tara Strong in English) is Maddie's dolphin friend, who works at the Party Puddle.
    - Neil (voiced by TBA in Korean and JP Karliak in English) is Maddie's friend, who's a marigold fishy with a dark magenta mohawk.
    - Bread (voiced by TBA in Korean and Jim Rash in English) is Maddie's friend, who's a green fishy with a red hat.
    - Butter (voiced by TBA in Korean and Alexander Polinsky in English) is Maddie's friend, who's a blue-ish indigo fish with a red jacket.
  - Clucks (voiced by Fred Tatasciore) is Chucks' pet sea chicken who sleeps.
- Vola (voiced by Kimberly Brooks) is a green female octopus who is very tomboyish. She loves sports and has two moms. The episodes "Medieval Tides", "The Great Skate Race", "Extreme Dodge Bubble", "The Trouble with Bunny Slugs", Petstravaganza", and "Ice Ice Vola" focus on her.
  - Viv (voiced by TBA in Korean and Sherry Cola in English) is Vola's octopus mama.
  - Vera (voiced by TBA in Korean and LaNisha Frederick in English) is Vola's octopus mom.
  - Axel (voiced by Alexander Polinsky in English) is Vola's pet bunny slug who roller-skates.
- Mason (voiced by TBA in Korean and Teddy Walsh in English) is a red male crab.
- Goldie (voiced by Cole Escola) is a female goldfish who's often vain and flamboyant. The episodes "The Show Must Flow On", "The Treat Goblin", "Funny Fish", "Goldie's Understudies", and "The Goldie Standard" focus on her.
  - Duchess (voiced by Cristina Milizia in English) is Goldie's pet clam who sings in high-tone, in which shakes the ground.
- Hank (voiced by Georgie Kidder in English) is a blue male whale who is the youngest of Baby Shark's friend group. The episodes "Rocky-Bye", "Bad Hank", "Fort Fin-ship", "The Slug Hank Redemption", "Doctor Drama", "Sherman in the Middle", "Finception", "The Cutie Pirate", and "Whale Songs" focus on him.
  - Rocky is Hank's pet rock.
  - Sherman (voiced by TBA in Korean and Gary Anthony Williams in English) is Hank's whale father.
  - Jozi (voiced by TBA in Korean and Carly Hughes in English) is Hank's whale stepmother.
  - Ashley (voiced by TBA in Korean and Cristina Milizia in English) is Hank's younger whale stepsister.
  - Splashley (voiced by TBA in Korean and Shelby Young in English) is Hank's other younger whale stepsister.
  - Slobber Slug (voiced by Fred Tatasciore) is a slobber slug, who later in the Season 3 episode "Petstravaganza" became Hank's pet.
- Shadow (voiced by Cristina Pucelli) is a grey male shark and Baby Shark's rival. The episodes "Shadowland", "Shadow on Ice", "Sorry, Not Sorry", and "The Nice Off" focus on him.
  - Bait (voiced by Rama Vallury) is a male purple tang who's Shadow's sidekick.
  - Switch (voiced by Tara Strong) is a brown angelfish who's also Shadow's sidekick.
  - Shadwina (voiced by TBA in Korean and Kirstin Dodson in English) is Shadow's mother.
  - Sledge (voiced by TBA in Korean and Antony Del Rio in English) is Shadow's hammerhead shark cousin who lives in Chomp City.
- Rayna Manta (voiced by Shelby Young) is a purple female manta ray who's a news reporter, and William's adoptive mother.
  - Barb (voiced by Betsy Sodaro) is a producer and a camera fishy.
- Marty Minnow (voiced by TBA in Korean and Griffin Puatu in English) is a green bespectacled male minnow and the leader of the minnows.
- Mayor Anchovy (voiced by John Michael Higgins) is the mayor of Carnivore Cove.
  - Flowbot 3000 (voiced by JP Karliak) is one of Mayor Anchovy's flowbots in Swimmy Hall.
- Big Fin (voiced by Nolan North) is a legendary fishy who lives in the Kelp Woods.
  - Sparky (voiced by Alex Cazares) is Big Fin's timid pet sea dragon.
- Teensy Tardigrade (voiced by Cristina Milizia) is Baby Shark's intelligent pet tardigrade.
- Chumby (voiced by Fred Tatasciore) is William's pet sea pig.
- Mail Whale (voiced by Fred Tatasciore) is a male blue delivery whale who only makes whale noises.
- Ernie Urchin (voiced by Kalo Moss in Season 1 and Bodhi Friedman in Seasons 2 and 3) is a spiny young sea urchin who has only an eye. The episode "Operation Ernie" focuses on him.
- Squinton Mollusca III (voiced by TBA in Korean and Tariq Logan in English) is a little squid with a bionic tentacle, who is Ernie Urchin's bestie. He wears round orange glasses.
- Wallace (voiced by TBA in Korean and Michaela Dietz in English) is a dolphin who lives in Baby Shark's neighborhood. He wears a red baseball cap. The episodes "Welcome Wagon" and "The Fishy Friends Talent Show" (along with Penny Piranha) focus on him.
- Penny Piranha (voiced by Aria Surrec) is a pink piranha who sometimes turns red when angry. The episodes "Buds at First Bite", "The Fishy Friends Talent Show" (along with Wallace), and "Shore Square" focus on her.
- Briny (voiced by Vasthy Mompoint) is a purple whale who works as a shopkeeper.
- Mr. Clownfish (voiced by James Mathis III) is a red clownfish working at a treat shop.
- Scoops (voiced by TBA in Korean and JP Karliak in English) is a penguin scooper who works in an ice cream shop called Iceberg Ice Cream.
  - Sprinkles (voiced by JP Karliak) is Scoops' pet baby slug.
- Bobby Gills (voiced by TBA in Korean and Natalie Palamides in English).
- Aggie (voiced by TBA in Korean and Jessica DiCicco in English) is a mean and selfish female purple triggerfish.
- Bloop (voiced by Kaitlyn Robrock) is a jellyfish that changes color based on an emotion it's feeling, and lives on a planet in hydrospace.
  - Bloop's Mom (voiced by Georgie Kidder) is Bloop's jellyfish mother that changes color based on an emotion she's feeling, and lives on a planet in hydrospace.
  - Bloop's Dad (voiced by Luke Youngblood) is Bloop's jellyfish father that changes color based on an emotion he's feeling, and lives on a planet in hydrospace.
- Wavey Jones (voiced by Michael Lawoye) is a ghost fishy who loves to boogie.
- Lannie (voiced by Chloe Fineman) is a green lantern shark who lives in Chomp City.
- Mariana (voiced by TBA in Korean and Carolina Ravassa in English) is a burgundy female megalodon.
- Package Pirates are a pirate crew.
  - Captain Bubblebeard (voiced by TBA in Korean and Raul Ceballos in English).
  - First Mate (voiced by TBA in Korean and Nolan North in English).
  - Bucky (voiced by TBA in Korean and Jeff Bennett in English).

=== Villains ===
- Vigo (voiced by TBA in Korean and Andrew Morgado in English) is a villainous vampire squid who is always trying to take over Carnivore Cove.
  - Costello (voiced by TBA in Korean and Alexander Polinsky in English) is a fish who is Vigo's assistant and henchman.
  - Seagore (voiced by Fred Tatasciore) is Vigo's pet sea warthog who's evil.
- Srimpress Werma (voiced by TBA in Korean and Audrey Wasilewski in English) is a villainous limbless-fishy who steals treats like ice cream from Iceberg Ice Cream and all the Chum Yums from Mr. Clownfish's treat shop.
- Bentley Barracuda (voiced by TBA in Korean and Jim Rash in English) is a snooty barracuda.
  - Niles (voiced by Jeff Bennett) is Bentley Barracuda's pet crab.
- Pirate Crew are the Package Pirate's pirate nemeses.
  - Captain Barnaclebeard (voiced by TBA in Korean and Fred Tatasciore in English) is Captain Bubblebeard's pirate nemesis.
  - Second Mate (voiced by TBA in Korean and Georgie Kidder in English) is First Mate's pirate nemesis.
  - Becky (voiced by TBA in Korean and Carolina Ravassa in English) is Bucky's pirate nemesis.
- Sea Dragon (voiced by Alex Cazares).
- Keith (voiced by Cole Escola).

== Production ==
On June 5, 2019, it was announced that the series was in development at Nickelodeon. On June 25, 2020, it was announced that Nickelodeon officially green-lit the series, with a 26-episode order. On November 12, 2020, it was announced that the series would premiere on December 11, 2020.

On July 20, 2021, it was announced that Nickelodeon renewed the series for a 26-episode second season, which premiered on October 18, 2022.

On June 13, 2023, the series was renewed for a third and final season of 18 half-hour episodes and four hour-long musical specials, which premiered on April 17, 2024. However, on June 1, 2025, it was announced that the four hour-long musical specials were scrapped, meaning the series will not be returning for those or a fourth season.

== Episodes ==
=== Series overview ===
Season	Episodes		Originally released		
Season	Episodes		First released	Last released	Network
1	34		December 11, 2020	September 29, 2022	Nickelodeon
2	36	30	October 18, 2022	December 21, 2023	Nickelodeon
2	36	6	April 8, 2024	April 16, 2024	Nick Jr.
3	22		April 17, 2024	January 14, 2025	Nick Jr.

=== Season 1 (2020–22) ===
No. overall	No. in season	Title	Directed by	Written by	Animation directed by	Original release date	South Korean air date	Prod. code	U.S. viewers (millions)
1	1	"All I Want for Fishmas"	Directed by : Raymond Santos; Supervising by : Mike Carlo	Story by : Whitney Ralls; Teleplay by : Max Beaudry, Josh Riley Brown, Francisco Paredes & Whitney Ralls; Storyboarded by : Chris Airgood, Hannah Bosnian, Cheyenne Curtis, Ryan Khatam, Hae-Joon Lee, Mike Nassar, David Shair & Zach Smith	Animation directed by : Crystal Stromer; Art directed by : Cheryl Johnson	December 11, 2020	December 25, 2020	101	0.72
2	2	"Baby Tooth"	Supervising by : Mike Carlo; Storyboard directed by : Raymond Santos	Written by : Whitney Ralls; Storyboarded by : Hannah Bosnian, Cheyenne Curtis, Ryan Khatam, Hae-Joon Lee, Nick Leysens & Zach Smith	Animation directed by : Crystal Stromer; Art directed by : Cheryl Johnson	March 26, 2021	September 4, 2021	103	0.53
2	2	"Slobber Slug"	Supervising by : Mike Carlo; Storyboard directed by : Raymond Santos	Written by : Josh Riley Brown; Storyboarded by : Chris Airgood, Hannah Bosnian, Ryan Khatam, Hae-Joon Lee & Mike Nassar	Animation directed by : Crystal Stromer; Art directed by : Cheryl Johnson	March 26, 2021	September 24, 2021	103	0.53
3	3	"Fish Friends Forever"	Supervising by : Mike Carlo; Storyboard directed by : Zach Smith	Written by : Sarah Allan; Storyboarded by : Cheyenne Curtis, Emily Gerich, Nick Leysens, Mike Nassar & Chris Airgood	Animation directed by : Crystal Stromer; Art directed by : Cheryl Johnson	April 2, 2021	September 24, 2021	102A	0.37
4	4	"Super-Shark"	Supervising by : Mike Carlo; Storyboard directed by : June Ahn	Written by : Max Beaudry & Francisco Paredes; Storyboarded by : Chris Airgood, Joe Sulsenti & Paul Villeco	Animation directed by : Crystal Stromer; Art directed by : Cheryl Johnson	April 9, 2021	September 24, 2021	104A	0.33
5	5	"William vs. Wild"	Supervising by : Mike Carlo; Storyboard directed by : Zach Smith	Written by : Max Beaudry & Francisco Paredes; Storyboarded by : Cheyenne Curtis, Emily Gerich, Greg Leysens, Nick Leysens, Ian Stewart, Chris Burns & Bob Fox	Animation directed by : Crystal Stromer; Art directed by : Cheryl Johnson	April 16, 2021	September 24, 2021	104B	0.40
6	6	"Live from the Shark House"	Michelle Glenn & Danielle Luzzi	Michelle Glenn & Danielle Luzzi	Rob Kohr	April 23, 2021	TBA	998	0.41
7	7	"Get Your Game On"	Michelle Glenn & Danielle Luzzi	Michelle Glenn & Danielle Luzzi	Rob Kohr	May 7, 2021	TBA	999	0.32
8	8	"Legendary Loot"	Supervising by : Mike Carlo; Storyboard directed by : Raymond Santos	Written by : Josh Riley Brown; Storyboarded by : Hannah Bosnian, Ryan Khatam & Hae-Joon Lee	Animation directed by : Crystal Stromer; Art directed by : Cheryl Johnson	June 18, 2021	September 24, 2021	105	0.43
8	8	"Yup Day"	Supervising by : Mike Carlo; Storyboard directed by : Zach Smith	Written by : Michelle McGee; Storyboarded by : Chris Airgood, Greg Leysens, Nick Leysens, Emily Gerich & Mike Nassar	Animation directed by : Crystal Stromer; Art directed by : Cheryl Johnson	June 18, 2021	September 24, 2021	105	0.43
9	9	"When You Wish Upon a Fish"	Supervising by : Mike Carlo; Storyboard directed by : June Ahn	Written by : Max Beaudry & Francisco Paredes; Storyboarded by : Chris Airgood, Joe Sulsenti & Paul Villeco	Animation directed by : Crystal Stromer; Art directed by : Cheryl Johnson	June 25, 2021	October 3, 2021	106A	0.39
10	10	"Shark-Off"	Supervising by : Mike Carlo; Storyboard directed by : Raymond Santos	Written by : Whitney Ralls; Storyboarded by : Hannah Bosnian, Ryan Khatam & Hae-Joon Lee	Animation directed by : Crystal Stromer; Art directed by : Cheryl Johnson	July 2, 2021	October 3, 2021	106B	0.32
11	11	"Baby Mayor"	Supervising by : Mike Carlo; Storyboard directed by : Raymond Santos	Written by : Michelle McGee; Storyboarded by : Hannah Bosnian, Ryan Khatam, Hae-Joon Lee & Mike Nassar	Animation directed by : Crystal Stromer; Art directed by : Cheryl Johnson	July 9, 2021	October 27, 2021	108A	0.36
12	12	"The Show Must Flow On"	Supervising by : Mike Carlo; Storyboard directed by : Zach Smith	Written by : Josh Riley Brown; Storyboarded by : Emily Gerich, Christy Karacas, Greg Leysens, Nick Leysens & Mike Nassar	Animation directed by : Crystal Stromer; Art directed by : Cheryl Johnson	July 16, 2021	October 8, 2021	107	0.32
12	12	"Detective Baby Shark"	Supervising by : Mike Carlo; Storyboard directed by : June Ahn	Written by : Max Beaudry & Francisco Paredes; Storyboarded by : Chris Airgood, Joe Sulsenti & Paul Villeco	Animation directed by : Crystal Stromer; Art directed by : Cheryl Johnson	July 16, 2021	October 8, 2021	107	0.32
13	13	"Sink or Swim"	Supervising by : Mike Carlo; Storyboard directed by : June Ahn & Mike Nassar	Written by : Josh Riley Brown; Storyboarded by : Chris Airgood, Joe Sulsenti & Paul Villeco	Animation directed by : Crystal Stromer; Art directed by : Cheryl Johnson	July 23, 2021	October 28, 2021	108B	0.31
14	14	"Teensy the Tardigrade"	Supervising by : Mike Carlo; Storyboard directed by : Raymond Santos & Mike Nassar	Written by : Whitney Ralls; Storyboarded by : Hannah Bosnian, Ryan Khatam & Hae-Joon Lee	Animation directed by : Crystal Stromer; Art directed by : Cheryl Johnson	July 30, 2021	November 4, 2021	109B	0.48
15	15	"Captain Kelp"	Supervising by : Mike Carlo; Storyboard directed by : Zach Smith & Mike Nassar	Written by : Max Beaudry & Francisco Paredes; Storyboarded by : Emily Gerich, Christy Karacas, Greg Leysens & Nick Leysens	Animation directed by : Crystal Stromer; Art directed by : Cheryl Johnson	August 6, 2021	November 3, 2021	109A	0.56
16	16	"Shadowland"	Supervising by : Mike Carlo; Storyboard directed by : Mike Carlo & Mike Nassar	Written by : Michelle McGee; Storyboarded by : Joe Apel, Emily Gerich & Nick Leysens	Animation directed by : Crystal Stromer; Art directed by : Cheryl Johnson	September 10, 2021	November 10, 2021	110	0.47
16	16	"Medieval Tides"	Supervising by : Mike Carlo; Storyboard directed by : June Ahn & Mike Nassar	Written by : Max Beaudry & Francisco Paredes; Storyboarded by : Chris Airgood, Paul Villeco & Joe Sulsenti	Animation directed by : Crystal Stromer; Art directed by : Cheryl Johnson	September 10, 2021	November 11, 2021	110	0.47
17	17	"Daddyshack"	Supervising by : Mike Carlo; Storyboard directed by : Raymond Santos & Mike Nassar	Written by : Max Beaudry & Francisco Parades; Storyboarded by : Hannah Bosnian, Ryan Khatam & Hae-Joon Lee	Animation directed by : Crystal Stromer; Art directed by : Cheryl Johnson	October 8, 2021	November 24, 2021	112	0.37
17	17	"Rocky-Bye"	Supervising by : Mike Carlo; Storyboard directed by : June Ahn & Mike Nassar	Written by : Max Beaudry & Francisco Paredes; Storyboarded by : Chris Airgood, Paul Villeco & Joe Sulsenti	Animation directed by : Crystal Stromer; Art directed by : Cheryl Johnson	October 8, 2021	November 25, 2021	112	0.37
18	18	"Baby Shark's Haunted Halloween"	Supervising by : Mike Carlo; Storyboard directed by : Raymond Santos & Mike Nassar	Written by : Josh Riley Brown; Storyboarded by : Hannah Bosnian, Ryan Khatam & Hae-Joon Lee	Animation directed by : Crystal Stromer; Art directed by : Cheryl Johnson	October 20, 2021	November 17, 2021	111	0.35
18	18	"Wavey Jones' Locker"	Supervising by : Mike Carlo; Storyboard directed by : Mike Carlo & Mike Nassar	Written by : Max Beaudry & Francisco Paredes; Storyboarded by : Joe Apel, Emily Gerich & Nick Leysens	Animation directed by : Crystal Stromer; Art directed by : Cheryl Johnson	October 20, 2021	November 18, 2021	111	0.35
19	19	"Rainy Day Roundup"	Supervising by : Mike Carlo; Storyboard directed by : Christine Kwon & Mike Nassar	Written by : Max Beaudry & Francisco Paredes; Storyboarded by : Joe Apel, Emily Gerich & Nick Leysens	Animation directed by : Crystal Stromer; Art directed by : Cheryl Johnson	November 12, 2021	December 1, 2021	113	0.26
19	19	"Deep Goo Sea"	Supervising by : Mike Carlo; Storyboard directed by : June Ahn & Mike Nassar	Written by : Michelle McGee; Storyboarded by : Chris Airgood, Paul Villeco & Joe Sulsenti	Animation directed by : Crystal Stromer; Art directed by : Cheryl Johnson	November 12, 2021	December 2, 2021	113	0.26
20	20	"Snowball Bonanza"	Supervising by : Mike Carlo; Storyboard directed by : June Ahn & Mike Nassar	Written by : Max Beaudry & Francisco Paredes; Storyboarded by : Chris Airgood, Joe Sulsenti & Paul Villeco	Animation directed by : Crystal Stromer; Art directed by : Cheryl Johnson	December 9, 2021	June 6, 2022	115	0.27
20	20	"The Present"	Supervising by : Mike Carlo; Storyboard directed by : Raymond Santos & Mike Nassar	Written by : Michelle McGee; Storyboarded by : Hannah Bosnian, Ryan Khatam & Hae-Joon Lee	Animation directed by : Crystal Stromer; Art directed by : Cheryl Johnson	December 9, 2021	June 7, 2022	115	0.27
21	21	"Shark Strength"	Supervising by : Mike Carlo; Storyboard directed by : June Ahn & Mike Nassar	Written by : Max Beaudry & Francisco Paredes; Storyboarded by : Chris Airgood, Joe Sulsenti & Paul Villeco	Animation directed by : Crystal Stromer; Art directed by : Cheryl Johnson	January 21, 2022	June 13, 2022	116	0.35
21	21	"Good Trouble"	Supervising by : Mike Carlo; Storyboard directed by : Raymond Santos & Mike Nassar	Written by : Michelle McGee; Storyboarded by : Hannah Bosnian, Ryan Khatam & Hae-Joon Lee	Animation directed by : Crystal Stromer; Art directed by : Cheryl Johnson	January 21, 2022	June 14, 2022	116	0.35
22	22	"Coach Grandma"	Supervising by : Mike Carlo; Storyboard directed by : Christine Kwon & Mike Nassar	Written by : Josh Riley Brown; Storyboarded by : Joe Apel, Emily Gerich & Jesse Yang	Animation directed by : Crystal Stromer; Art directed by : Cheryl Johnson	February 7, 2022	May 31, 2022	114	0.33
22	22	"Busy Baby"	Supervising by : Mike Carlo; Storyboard directed by : Raymond Santos & Mike Nassar	Written by : Josh Riley Brown; Storyboarded by : Hannah Bosnian, Christy Karacas, Ryan Khatam & Hae-Joon Lee	Animation directed by : Crystal Stromer; Art directed by : Cheryl Johnson	February 7, 2022	May 30, 2022	114	0.33
23	23	"Best Fin-Ship Day"	Supervising by : Mike Carlo; Storyboard directed by : June Ahn & Mike Nassar	Written by : Max Beaudry and Francisco Parades; Storyboarded by : Chris Airgood, Paul Villeco & Joe Sulsenti	Animation directed by : Crystal Stromer; Art directed by : Cheryl Johnson	February 14, 2022	June 20, 2022	117	0.25
23	23	"The Great Skate Case"	Supervising by : Mike Carlo; Storyboard directed by : Christine Kwon	Written by : Katie Chilson; Storyboarded by : Joe Apel, Emily Gerich, James Sugrue & Jesse Yang	Animation directed by : Crystal Stromer; Art directed by : Cheryl Johnson	February 14, 2022	June 21, 2022	117	0.25
24	24	"Shark Prank"	Supervising by : Mike Carlo; Storyboard directed by : Raymond Santos	Written by : Max Beaudry and Francisco Parades; Storyboarded by : Hannah Bosnian, Ryan Khatam & Hae-Joon Lee	Animation directed by : Crystal Stromer; Art directed by : Cheryl Johnson	April 1, 2022	July 19, 2022	121	0.29
24	24	"Lagoon Lemonade"	Supervising by : Mike Carlo; Storyboard directed by : June Ahn	Written by : Michelle McGee; Storyboarded by : Chris Airgood, Paul Villeco & Joe Sulsenti	Animation directed by : Crystal Stromer; Art directed by : Cheryl Johnson	April 1, 2022	July 18, 2022	121	0.29
25	25	"The Seaweed Sway"	Supervising by : Mike Carlo; Storyboard directed by : Christine Kwon & Mike Nassar	Written by : Jackie Burke; Storyboarded by : Joe Apel, Emily Gerich, Christy Karacas & Jesse Yang	Animation directed by : Crystal Stromer; Art directed by : Cheryl Johnson	April 15, 2022	July 4, 2022	119	0.38
25	25	"Flow Bros"	Supervising by : Mike Carlo; Storyboard directed by : June Ahn	Written by : Max Beaudry and Francisco Parades; Storyboarded by : Chris Airgood, Paul Villeco & Joe Sulsenti	Animation directed by : Crystal Stromer; Art directed by : Cheryl Johnson	April 15, 2022	July 5, 2022	119	0.38
26	26	"A Shark Day's Night"	Supervising by : Mike Carlo; Storyboard directed by : Raymond Santos	Written by : Ed Lee; Storyboarded by : Hannah Bosnian, Ryan Khatam & Hae-Joon Lee	Animation directed by : Crystal Stromer; Art directed by : Cheryl Johnson	April 22, 2022	July 11, 2022	120	0.35
26	26	"Bad Hank"	Supervising by : Mike Carlo; Storyboard directed by : Christine Kwon	Written by : Josh Riley Brown; Storyboarded by : Joe Apel, Emily Gerich & Jesse Yang	Animation directed by : Crystal Stromer; Art directed by : Cheryl Johnson	April 22, 2022	July 12, 2022	120	0.35
27	27	"Operation Happy Mommies"	Supervising by : Mike Carlo; Storyboard directed by : Raymond Santos	Written by : Josh Riley Brown; Storyboarded by : Hannah Bosnian, Ryan Khatam & Hae-Joon Lee	Animation directed by : Crystal Stromer; Art directed by : Cheryl Johnson	May 6, 2022	July 25, 2022	123	0.22
27	27	"Buds at First Bite"	Supervising by : Mike Carlo; Storyboard directed by : Christine Kwon	Written by : Michelle McGee; Storyboarded by : Joe Apel, Emily Gerich & Jesse Yang	Animation directed by : Crystal Stromer; Art directed by : Cheryl Johnson	May 6, 2022	July 26, 2022	123	0.22
28	28	"A Tail of Two Fathers"	Supervising by : Mike Carlo; Storyboard directed by : Christine Kwon & Mike Nassar	Written by : Max Beaudry and Francisco Parades; Storyboarded by : Joe Apel, Emily Gerich & Jesse Yang	Animation directed by : Crystal Stromer; Art directed by : Cheryl Johnson	June 17, 2022	August 8, 2022	125	0.26
28	28	"Welcome Wagon"	Supervising by : Mike Carlo; Storyboard directed by : June Ahn & Mike Nassar	Written by : Michelle McGee; Storyboarded by : Chris Argood, Joe Sulsenti & Paul Villeco	Animation directed by : Crystal Stromer; Art directed by : Cheryl Johnson	June 17, 2022	August 9, 2022	125	0.26
29	29	"William Manta: News Fish"	Supervising by : Mike Carlo; Storyboard directed by : Raymond Santos & Mike Nassar	Written by : Josh Riley Brown; Storyboarded by : Hannah Bosnian, Ryan Khatam & Hae-Joon Lee	Animation directed by : Crystal Stromer; Art directed by : Cheryl Johnson	July 22, 2022	June 27, 2022	118	0.30
29	29	"Sleeping Like a Baby Shark"	Supervising by : Mike Carlo; Storyboard directed by : Christine Kwon & Mike Nassar	Written by : Michelle McGee; Storyboarded by : Joe Apel, Emily Gerich & Jesse Yang	Animation directed by : Crystal Stromer; Art directed by : Cheryl Johnson	July 22, 2022	June 28, 2022	118	0.30
30	30	"The Lost Jelly"	Supervising by : Mike Carlo; Storyboard directed by : Christine Kwon	Written by : Gloria Shen; Storyboarded by : Joe Apel, Emily Gerich & Jesse Yang	Animation directed by : Crystal Stromer; Art directed by : Cheryl Johnson	July 29, 2022	August 1, 2022	122	0.28
30	30	"The Coral Dilemma"	Supervising by : Mike Carlo; Storyboard directed by : June Ahn	Written by : Jackie Burke; Storyboarded by : Chris Argood, Joe Sulsenti & Paul Villeco	Animation directed by : Crystal Stromer; Art directed by : Cheryl Johnson	July 29, 2022	August 2, 2022	122	0.28
31	31	"The Masked Fishy"	Supervising by : Mike Carlo; Storyboard directed by : Christine Kwon	Written by : Whitney Ralls; Storyboarded by : Chris Airgood, Joe Apel, Emily Gerich, Josh Howell, Hae-Joon Lee, Ryan Khatam, Joe Sulsenti, Paul Villeco & Jesse Yang	Animation directed by : Crystal Stromer; Art directed by : Cheryl Johnson	September 26, 2022	August 22, 2022	126A	0.27
32	32	"The Best Friends Game"	Supervising by : Mike Carlo; Storyboard directed by : Mike Nassar & Raymond Santos	Written by : Josh Riley Brown; Storyboarded by : Josh Howell, Ryan Khatam & Hae-Joon Lee	Animation directed by : Crystal Stromer; Art directed by : Cheryl Johnson	September 27, 2022	August 23, 2022	126B	N/A
33	33	"A Mail Whale Tale"	Supervising by : Mike Carlo; Storyboard directed by : June Ahn & Mike Nassar	Written by : Max Beaudry and Francisco Parades; Storyboarded by : Chris Airgood, Joe Sulsenti & Paul Villeco	Animation directed by : Crystal Stromer; Art directed by : Cheryl Johnson	September 28, 2022	August 16, 2022	124A	0.18
34	34	"Swimming With the Sharks"	Supervising by : Mike Carlo; Storyboard directed by : Raymond Santos & Mike Nassar	Written by : Crescent Imani Novell; Storyboarded by : Davey Jarrell, Christy Karacas, Ryan Khatam, Hae-Joon Lee & James Surgue	Animation directed by : Crystal Stromer; Art directed by : Cheryl Johnson	September 29, 2022	August 15, 2022	124B	0.20

=== Season 2 (2022–24) ===
The entire season was supervised directed by Mike Carlo, with animation direction by Crystal Stromer and art direction by Cheryl Johnson.

No. overall	No. in season	Title	Storyboard direction by	Written by	Storyboarded by	Original release date	South Korean air date	Prod. code	U.S. viewers (millions)
Nickelodeon
35	1	"The Treat Goblin"	Raymond Santos & Mike Nassar	Michelle McGee	Josh Howell, Ryan Khatam & Hae-Joon Lee	October 18, 2022	August 24, 2023	204	0.16
35	1	"Baby Super Shark"	June Ahn & Mike Nassar	Max Beaudry & Francisco Paredes	Chris Airgood, Joe Sulsenti & Paul Villeco	October 18, 2022	August 3, 2023	204	0.16
36	2	"Fort Fin-ship"	June Ahn & Mike Nassar	Max Beaudry & Francisco Paredes	Chris Airgood, Joe Sulsenti & Paul Villeco	November 4, 2022	August 3, 2023	201	0.23
36	2	"Water Buggin'"	Raymond Santos & Mike Nassar	Michelle McGee	Josh Howell, Ryan Khatam & Hae-Joon Lee	November 4, 2022	August 25, 2023	201	0.23
37	3	"Fishtival of Lights"	June Ahn & Mike Nassar	Josh Riley Brown	Chris Airgood, Joe Sulsenti & Paul Villeco	December 2, 2022	September 1, 2023	207	N/A
37	3	"Shadow on Ice"	Raymond Santos & Mike Nassar	Max Beaudry & Francisco Parades	Josh Howell, Ryan Khatam & Hae-Joon Lee	December 2, 2022	August 4, 2023	207	N/A
38	4	"The Secret Password"	Raymond Santos & Mike Nassar	Michelle McGee	Josh Howell, Ryan Khatam & Hae-Joon Lee	December 12, 2022	203A	0.17	
39	5	"Monday Funday"	Christine Kwon & Mike Nassar	Josh Riley Brown	Joe Apel, Emily Gerich, Katy Shuttleworth & Jesse Yang	December 13, 2022	September 8, 2023	203B	0.12
40	6	"Best in Flow"	Christine Kwon & Mike Nassar	Josh Riley Brown	Joe Apel, Emily Gerich & Jesse Yang	December 14, 2022	September 14, 2023	202A	0.14
41	7	"Blizzard Wizard"	June Ahn & Mike Nassar	Max Beaudry & Francisco Parades	Katy Shuttleworth, Joe Sulsenti, James Surgue & Paul Villeco	December 15, 2022	August 4, 2023	202B	0.18
42	8	"Extreme Dodge Bubble"	Christine Kwon & Mike Nassar	Josh Riley Brown	Joe Apel, Emily Gerich & Jesse Yang	January 6, 2023	August 31, 2023	205	0.15
42	8	"The Lost Tickets"	June Ahn & Mike Nassar	Kristin Lynn Wallace	Chris Airgood, Joe Sulsenti & Paul Villeco	January 6, 2023	August 18, 2023	205	0.15
43	9	"Tour Fishies"	Mike Nassar & Raymond Santos	Max Beaudry & Francisco Paredes	Josh Howell, Ryan Khatam & Hae-Joon Lee	January 13, 2023	September 7, 2023	206	0.14
43	9	"Sorry, Not Sorry"	Christine Kwon & Mike Nassar	Michelle McGee	Joe Apel, Emily Gerich & Jesse Yang	January 13, 2023	September 22, 2023	206	0.14
44	10	"The Lucky Necklace"	Christine Kwon & Mike Nassar	Jackie Burke	Joe Apel, Emily Gerich, Katy Shuttleworth & Jesse Yang	January 20, 2023	August 10, 2023	208	0.16
44	10	"Vigo's Surprise"	June Ahn & Mike Nassar	Michelle McGee	Katy Shuttleworth, Joe Sulsenti & Paul Villeco	January 20, 2023	September 15, 2023	208	0.16
45	11	"Call Me Billiam"	Mike Nassar & Raymond Santos	Josh Riley Brown	Josh Howell, Ryan Khatam & Hae-Joon Lee	January 27, 2023	September 21, 2023	209	0.23
45	11	"The Finship Trap"	Christine Kwon	Ed Lee	Joe Apel, Emily Gerich & Jesse Yang	January 27, 2023	August 18, 2023	209	0.23
46	12	"Jelly Pox"	June Ahn	Katie Chilson	Joe Sulsenti, Paul Villeco & Chris Airgood	March 6, 2023	September 2, 2021	102B	N/A
47	13	"Splish Splashketball"	June Ahn & Mike Nassar	Max Beaudry & Francisco Paredes	Chris Airgood, Matt Peters, Joe Sulsenti & Paul Villeco	March 17, 2023	October 5, 2023	211	0.14
47	13	"The Slug Hank Redemption"	Christine Kwon & Mike Nassar	Josh Riley Brown	Joe Apel, Emily Gerich & Jesse Yang	March 17, 2023	October 6, 2023	211	0.14
48	14	"The Trouble with Bunny Slugs"	June Ahn & Mike Nassar	Michelle McGee	Chris Airgood, Joe Sulsenti & Paul Villeco	June 9, 2023	October 12, 2023	213	0.17
48	14	"Life with Chumby"	Raymond Santos & Mike Nassar	Max Beaudry & Francisco Parades	Josh Howell, Ryan Khatam & Hae-Joon Lee	June 9, 2023	October 13, 2023	213	0.17
49	15	"Shark House Rock"	June Ahn & Mike Nassar	Michelle McGee	Chris Airgood, Joe Sulsenti & Paul Villeco	June 16, 2023	September 28, 2023	210	0.15
49	15	"Toothpaste Tumble"	Raymond Santos & Mike Nassar	Max Beaudry & Francisco Parades	Josh Howell, Ryan Khatam & Hae-Joon Lee	June 16, 2023	September 29, 2023	210	0.15
50	16	"Washed Up"	Christine Kwon & Mike Nassar	Josh Riley Brown	Joe Apel, Emily Gerich & Jesse Yang	June 23, 2023	N/A	214	0.17
50	16	"2 Cool 4 Rules"	June Ahn & Mike Nassar	Michelle McGee	Chris Airgood, Joe Sulsenti & Paul Villeco	June 23, 2023	N/A	214	0.17
51	17	"Fishy Force"	Raymond Santos & Mike Nassar	Josh Riley Brown	Josh Howell, Ryan Khatam & Hae-Joon Lee	September 18, 2023	TBA	221	0.12
51	17	"Superhero Training Day"	Christine Kwon & Mike Nassar	Jackie Burke	Joe Apel, Emily Gerich & Jesse Yang	September 18, 2023	TBA	221	0.12
52	18	"Findependence Day"	June Ahn & Mike Nassar	Kristin Lynne Wallace	Chris Airgood, Joe Sulsenti & Paul Villeco	September 25, 2023	TBA	222	0.16
52	18	"Costello Quits"	Mike Nassar & Raymond Santos	Zachary Steinberg	Josh Howell, Ryan Khatam, Hae-Joon Lee & Jesse Yang	September 25, 2023	TBA	222	0.16
53	19	"Saltwater Studios"	Christine Kwon & Mike Nassar	Jackie Burke	Joe Apel, Christy Karacas, Emily Gerich & Jesse Yang	December 4, 2023	TBA	226	0.11
53	19	"Sand Crabby"	June Ahn & Mike Nassar	Josh Riley Brown	Andy Greiling, Joe Sulsenti & Paul Villeco	December 4, 2023	TBA	226	0.11
54	20	"FLOWMO"	Raymond Santos & Mike Nassar	Paul Jaffe & Sophie Pustil	Josh Howell, Ryan Khatam & Hae-Joon Lee	December 5, 2023	TBA	224	N/A
54	20	"Fishy Scouts"	Christine Kwon & Mike Nassar	Jackie Burke	Joe Apel, Emily Gerich & Jesse Yang	December 5, 2023	TBA	224	N/A
55	21	"Finloose"	June Ahn & Mike Nassar	Michelle McGee	Andy Greiling, Joe Sulsenti & Paul Villeco	December 6, 2023	TBA	225	N/A
55	21	"Operation Ernie"	Raymond Santos & Mike Nassar	Kristin Lynn Wallace	Josh Howell, Ryan Khatam & Hae-Joon Lee	December 6, 2023	TBA	225	N/A
56	22	"Picture Imperfect"	Raymond Santos & Mike Nassar	Michelle McGee	Josh Howell, Ryan Khatam & Hae-Joon Lee	December 7, 2023	October 19, 2023	212	N/A
56	22	"The Fishy Friends Talent Show"	Christine Kwon & Mike Nassar	Josh Riley Brown	Joe Apel, Christy Karacas, Emily Gerich & Jesse Yang	December 7, 2023	October 20, 2023	212	N/A
57	23	"Doctor Drama"	Raymond Santos & Mike Nassar	Max Beaudry & Francisco Parades	Josh Howell, Ryan Khatam & Hae-Joon Lee	December 11, 2023	TBA	215A	0.13
58	24	"The White Whale"	Christine Kwon & Mike Nassar	Josh Riley Brown	Joe Apel, Emily Gerich & Jesse Yang	December 12, 2023	TBA	215B	0.12
59	25	"Sherman in the Middle"	June Ahn & Mike Nassar	Michelle McGee	Chris Airgood, Andy Greiling, Joe Sulsenti & Paul Villeco	December 13, 2023	TBA	216A	N/A
60	26	"Smoothie Day"	Raymond Santos & Mike Nassar	Katrina Davis	Josh Howell, Ryan Khatam & Hae-Joon Lee	December 14, 2023	TBA	216B	0.13
61	27	"Finterstellar"	Christine Kwon & Mike Nassar	Josh Riley Brown	Joe Apel, Emily Gerich, Christy Karacas & Jesse Yang	December 18, 2023	TBA	217A	0.15
62	28	"Goldie's Greatest Role"	June Ahn & Mike Nassar	Michelle McGee	Chris Airgood, Joe Sulsenti & Paul Villeco	December 19, 2023	TBA	217B	0.10
63	29	"Deep Dark Disco"	Raymond Santos & Mike Nassar	Whitney Ralls	Josh Howell, Ryan Khatam & Hae-Joon Lee	December 20, 2023	TBA	218A	0.17
64	30	"Finception"	Christine Kwon & Mike Nassar	Josh Riley Brown	Joe Apel, Emily Gerich, Andy Greiling & Jesse Yang	December 21, 2023	TBA	218B	0.18
Nick Jr.
65	31	"Old Shark Bride"	June Ahn & Mike Nassar	Jackie Burke	Chris Airgood, Joe Sulsenti & Paul Villeco	April 8, 2024	TBA	219A	N/A
66	32	"Swimming Solo"	Raymond Santos & Mike Nassar	Kristin Lynn Wallace	Josh Howell, Ryan Khatam & Hae-Joon Lee	April 9, 2024	TBA	219B	N/A
67	33	"The Freeze Out"	Christine Kwon & Mike Nassar	Michelle McGee	Joe Apel, Emily Gerich & Jesse Yang	April 10, 2024	TBA	220A	N/A
68	34	"The Crystal Coral Conundrum"	June Ahn & Mike Nassar	Whitney Ralls & Kristin Lynne Wallace	Chris Airgood, Joe Sulsenti & Paul Villeco	April 11, 2024	TBA	220B	N/A
69	35	"Funny Fish"	Christine Kwon & Mike Nassar	Michelle McGee	Joe Apel, Emily Gerich & Jesse Yang	April 15, 2024	TBA	223A	N/A
70	36	"Club Cool"	June Ahn & Mike Nassar	Josh Riley Brown	Andy Greiling, Joe Sulsenti & Paul Villeco	April 16, 2024	TBA	223B	N/A

=== Season 3 (2024–25) ===
No. overall	No. in season	Title	Directed by	Written by	Animation directed by	Original release date	South Korean air date	Prod. code	U.S. viewers (millions)
71	1	"The Danceathon"	Supervising by : Mike Carlo; Storyboard directed by : Raymond Santos & Mike Nassar	Written by : Jackie Burke; Storyboarded by : Josh Howell, Ryan Khatam & Hae-Joon Lee	Animation directed by : Crystal Stromer; Art directed by : Cheryl Johnson	April 17, 2024	TBA	301A	N/A
72	2	"What Goes Up"	Supervising by : Mike Carlo; Storyboard directed by : Christine Kwon & Mike Nassar	Written by : Michelle McGee; Storyboarded by : Joe Apel, Emily Gerich, Christy Karacas & Jesse Yang	Animation directed by : Crystal Stromer; Art directed by : Cheryl Johnson	April 18, 2024	TBA	301B	N/A
73	3	"Goldie's Fintuition"	Supervising by : Mike Carlo; Storyboard directed by : June Ahn & Mike Nassar	Written by : Kristin Lynne Wallace; Storyboarded by : Chris Airgood, Joe Sulsenti & Paul Villeco	Animation directed by : Crystal Stromer; Art directed by : Cheryl Johnson	April 22, 2024	TBA	302A	N/A
74	4	"Raising Remy"	Supervising by : Mike Carlo; Storyboard directed by : Raymond Santos & Mike Nassar	Written by : Kim Denney Jones; Storyboarded by : Josh Howell, Ryan Khatam & Hae-Joon Lee	Animation directed by : Crystal Stromer; Art directed by : Cheryl Johnson	April 23, 2024	TBA	302B	N/A
75	5	"The Cutie Pirate"	Supervising by : Mike Carlo; Storyboard directed by : Christine D. Kwon & Mike Nassar	Written by : Jackie Burke; Storyboarded by : Joe Apel, Jesse Yang, Christy Karacas & Davey Jarrell	Animation directed by : Crystal Stromer; Art directed by : Cheryl Johnson	April 24, 2024	TBA	303A	N/A
76	6	"Hotel Shark"	Supervising by : Mike Carlo; Storyboard directed by : June Ahn & Mike Nassar	Written by : Michelle McGee; Storyboarded by : Chris Airgood, Joe Sulsenti & Paul Villeco	Animation directed by : Crystal Stromer; Art directed by : Cheryl Johnson	April 25, 2024	TBA	303B	N/A
77	7	"Swim Break"	Supervising by : Mike Carlo; Storyboard directed by : June Ahn & Mike Nassar	Written by : Paul Jaffe & Sophie Pustil; Storyboarded by : Chris Airgood, Joe Sulsenti & Paul Villeco	Animation directed by : Crystal Stromer; Art directed by : Cheryl Johnson	May 27, 2024	N/A	306	N/A
77	7	"The Lost Remote"	Supervising by : Mike Carlo; Storyboard directed by : Christine Kwon & Mike Nassar	Written by : Kristin Lynne Wallace; Storyboarded by : Joe Apel, Emily Gerich & Jesse Yang	Animation directed by : Crystal Stromer; Art directed by : Cheryl Johnson	May 27, 2024	N/A	306	N/A
78	8	"The Time Capsule"	Supervising by : Mike Carlo; Storyboard directed by : Raymond Santos & Mike Nassar	Written by : Kristin Lynne Wallace; Storyboarded by : Josh Howell, Ryan Khatam & Hae-Joon Lee	Animation directed by : Crystal Stromer; Art directed by : Cheryl Johnson	July 22, 2024	N/A	304	N/A
78	8	"Petstravaganza"	Supervising by : Mike Carlo; Storyboard directed by : Christine D. Kwon & Mike Nassar	Written by : Josh Riley Brown; Storyboarded by : Joe Apel, Emily Gerich, Jesse Yang & Christy Karacas	Animation directed by : Crystal Stromer; Art directed by : Cheryl Johnson	July 22, 2024	N/A	304	N/A
79	9	"Goldie's Understudies"	Supervising by : Mike Carlo; Storyboard directed by : June Ahn & Mike Nassar	Written by : Jackie Burke; Storyboarded by : Chris Airgood, Joe Sulsenti & Paul Villeco	Animation directed by : Crystal Stromer; Art directed by : Cheryl Johnson	July 23, 2024	N/A	305	N/A
79	9	"One Little Peek"	Supervising by : Mike Carlo; Storyboard directed by : Raymond Santos & Mike Nassar	Written by : Michelle McGee; Storyboarded by : Josh Howell, Ryan Khatam & Hae-Joon Lee	Animation directed by : Crystal Stromer; Art directed by : Cheryl Johnson	July 23, 2024	N/A	305	N/A
80	10	"Best Finemies"	Supervising by : Mike Carlo; Storyboard directed by : Raymond Santos & Mike Nassar	Written by : Jackie Burke; Storyboarded by : Josh Howell, Ryan Khatam & Hae-Joon Lee	Animation directed by : Crystal Stromer; Art directed by : Cheryl Johnson	July 24, 2024	N/A	307	N/A
80	10	"Dinner with Bentley"	Supervising by : Mike Carlo; Storyboard directed by : Christine Kwon & Mike Nassar	Written by : Michelle McGee; Storyboarded by : Joe Apel, Emily Gerich & Jesse Yang	Animation directed by : Crystal Stromer; Art directed by : Cheryl Johnson	July 24, 2024	N/A	307	N/A
81	11	"Lannie's Lights"	Supervising by : Mike Carlo; Storyboard directed by : June Ahn & Mike Nassar	Written by : Kristin Lynne Wallace; Storyboarded by : Chris Airgood, Davey Jarrell, Joe Sulsenti & Paul Villeco	Animation directed by : Crystal Stromer; Art directed by : Cheryl Johnson	July 25, 2024	N/A	308	N/A
81	11	"Assembly Required"	Supervising by : Mike Carlo; Storyboard directed by : Raymond Santos & Mike Nassar	Written by : Josh Riley Brown; Storyboarded by : Josh Howell, Ryan Khatam & Hae-Joon Lee	Animation directed by : Crystal Stromer; Art directed by : Cheryl Johnson	July 25, 2024	N/A	308	N/A
82	12	"Whale Songs"	Supervising by : Mike Carlo; Storyboard directed by : Christine Kwon & Mike Nassar	Written by : Jackie Burke; Storyboarded by : Joe Apel, Emily Gerich & Jesse Yang	Animation directed by : Crystal Stromer; Art directed by : Cheryl Johnson	July 29, 2024	N/A	309	N/A
82	12	"Tell-Tale Scooter"	Supervising by : Mike Carlo; Storyboard directed by : June Ahn & Mike Nassar	Written by : Michelle McGee; Storyboarded by : Chris Airgood, Joe Sulsenti & Paul Villeco	Animation directed by : Crystal Stromer; Art directed by : Cheryl Johnson	July 29, 2024	N/A	309	N/A
83	13	"Ice Ice Vola"	Supervising by : Mike Carlo; Storyboard directed by : Raymond Santos & Mike Nassar	Written by : Sam Bissonnette; Storyboarded by : Josh Howell, Ryan Khatam & Hae-Joon Lee	Animation directed by : Crystal Stromer; Art directed by : Cheryl Johnson	July 30, 2024	TBA	310A	N/A
84	14	"Do or Diary"	Supervising by : Mike Carlo; Storyboard directed by : Christine D. Kwon & Mike Nassar	Written by : Kristin Lynne Wallace; Storyboarded by : Joe Apel, Emily Gerich & Jesse Yang	Animation directed by : Crystal Stromer; Art directed by : Cheryl Johnson	July 31, 2024	TBA	310B	N/A
85	15	"The Power Swap"	Supervising by : Mike Carlo; Storyboard directed by : June Ahn & Mike Nassar	Written by : Jackie Burke; Storyboarded by : Chris Airgood, Joe Sulsenti & Paul Villeco	Animation directed by : Crystal Stromer; Art directed by : Cheryl Johnson	January 7, 2025	N/A	311	N/A
85	15	"Shore Square"	Supervising by : Mike Carlo; Storyboard directed by : Raymond Santos & Mike Nassar	Written by : Michelle McGee; Storyboarded by : Josh Howell, Ryan Khatam & Hae-Joon Lee	Animation directed by : Crystal Stromer; Art directed by : Cheryl Johnson	January 7, 2025	N/A	311	N/A
86	16	"Blizz's Big Bite"	Supervising by : Mike Carlo; Storyboard directed by : Christine Kwon & Mike Nassar	Written by : Zachary Steinberg; Storyboarded by : Joe Apel, Emily Gerich & Jesse Yang	Animation directed by : Crystal Stromer; Art directed by : Cheryl Johnson	January 8, 2025	N/A	312	N/A
86	16	"Friend of a Friend"	Supervising by : Mike Carlo; Storyboard directed by : June Ahn & Mike Nassar	Written by : Kristin Lynne Wallace; Storyboarded by : Chris Airgood, Joe Sulsenti & Paul Villeco	Animation directed by : Crystal Stromer; Art directed by : Cheryl Johnson	January 8, 2025	N/A	312	N/A
87	17	"Daddy's Favorite"	Supervising by : Mike Carlo; Storyboard directed by : Raymond Santos & Mike Nassar	Written by : Jackie Burke; Storyboarded by : Josh Howell, Ryan Khatam & Hae-Joon Lee	Animation directed by : Crystal Stromer; Art directed by : Cheryl Johnson	January 9, 2025	N/A	313	N/A
87	17	"The Goldie Standard"	Supervising by : Mike Carlo; Storyboard directed by : Christine Kwon & Mike Nassar	Written by : Jessica Welsh; Storyboarded by : Joe Apel, Emily Gerich & Jesse Yang	Animation directed by : Crystal Stromer; Art directed by : Cheryl Johnson	January 9, 2025	N/A	313	N/A
88	18	"The Nice Off"	Supervising by : Mike Carlo; Storyboard directed by : June Ahn & Mike Nassar	Written by : Michelle McGee; Storyboarded by : Chris Airgood, Joe Sulsenti & Paul Villeco	Animation directed by : Crystal Stromer; Art directed by : Cheryl Johnson	January 10, 2025	N/A	314	N/A
88	18	"Substitute Toothfish Fairy"	Supervising by : Mike Carlo; Storyboard directed by : Raymond Santos & Mike Nassar	Written by : Kristin Lynne Wallace; Storyboarded by : Josh Howell, Ryan Khatam & Hae-Joon Lee	Animation directed by : Crystal Stromer; Art directed by : Cheryl Johnson	January 10, 2025	N/A	314	N/A
89	19	"The William Manta Show"	Supervising by : Mike Carlo; Storyboard directed by : Christine Kwon & Mike Nassar	Written by : Kim Denney Jones; Storyboarded by : Joe Apel, Emily Gerich & Jesse Yang	Animation directed by : Crystal Stromer; Art directed by : Cheryl Johnson	January 11, 2025	N/A	315	N/A
89	19	"The Musical Mystery"	Supervising by : Mike Carlo; Storyboard directed by : June Ahn & Mike Nassar	Written by : Jackie Burke; Storyboarded by : Chris Airgood, Joe Sulsenti & Paul Villeco	Animation directed by : Crystal Stromer; Art directed by : Cheryl Johnson	January 11, 2025	N/A	315	N/A
90	20	"Meet the Wub Wubs"	Supervising by : Mike Carlo; Storyboard directed by : Raymond Santos & Mike Nassar	Written by : Becky Prosky; Storyboarded by : Josh Howell, Ryan Khatam & Hae-Joon Lee	Animation directed by : Crystal Stromer; Art directed by : Cheryl Johnson	January 12, 2025	N/A	316	N/A
90	20	"Invinci-bubble"	Supervising by : Mike Carlo; Storyboard directed by : Christine Kwon & Mike Nassar	Written by : Michelle McGee; Storyboarded by : Joe Apel, Lauren Bergholm & Jesse Yang	Animation directed by : Crystal Stromer; Art directed by : Cheryl Johnson	January 12, 2025	N/A	316	N/A
91	21	"Holders Keepers"	Supervising by : Mike Carlo; Storyboard directed by : June Ahn & Mike Nassar	Written by : Paige Elson; Storyboarded by : Chris Airgood, Joseph Sulsenti & Paul Villeco	Animation directed by : Crystal Stromer; Art directed by : Cheryl Johnson	January 13, 2025	N/A	317	N/A
91	21	"The Nickname King"	Supervising by : Mike Carlo; Storyboard directed by : Raymond Santos & Mike Nassar	Written by : Mayanna Berrin & Bryan Smith; Storyboarded by : Josh Howell, Ryan Khatam & Hae-Joon Lee	Animation directed by : Crystal Stromer; Art directed by : Cheryl Johnson	January 13, 2025	N/A	317	N/A
92	22	"Guiding Grandma"	Supervising by : Mike Carlo; Storyboard directed by : Christine Kwon & Mike Nassar	Written by : Liz Chun; Storyboarded by : Joe Apel, Emily Gerich & Jesse Yang	Animation directed by : Crystal Stromer; Art directed by : Cheryl Johnson	January 14, 2025	N/A	318	N/A
92	22	"The Nautical Night Fair"	Supervising by : Mike Carlo; Storyboard directed by : June Ahn & Mike Nassar	Written by : Jackie Burke, Josh Riley Brown, Michelle McGee, Kim Denney Jones, Zachary Steinberg & Kristin Lynne Wallace; Storyboarded by : Lauren Bergholm, Joseph Sulsenti & Paul Villeco	Animation directed by : Crystal Stromer; Art directed by : Cheryl Johnson	January 14, 2025	N/A	318	N/A

== Film (2023) ==
Title	Directed by	Written by	Animation directed by	Original release date	South Korean air date	U.S. viewers (millions)
Baby Shark's Big Movie!	Alan Foreman	Whitney Ralls	Leah Reddington	December 8, 2023	TBA	0.14

== Shorts ==
Gary Doodles, Tommy Sica and Whitney Ralls executive produce the shorts, with Ralls doing the stories for each of them. Exit 73 Studios provides the animation to all of them as well.

No.	Title	Teleplay by	Original release date	Prod. code
1	"Crumb of a Clue"	Whitney Ralls	February 26, 2021	S101
2	"The Bunny Slug"	Whitney Ralls	February 26, 2021	S102
3	"Operation Cool Quest"	Whitney Ralls	February 26, 2021	S103
4	"No Time for Timeouts" "No Time for Time Out"	Michelle McGee	February 26, 2021	S104
5	"Knock it Off"	Max Beaudry & Francisco Paredes	February 26, 2021	S105
6	"Goldie's Lock"	Michelle McGee	May 14, 2021	S106
7	"Chore Song"	Max Beaudry & Francisco Paredes	May 21, 2021	S107
8	"Mommy Works From Home"	Michelle McGee	May 28, 2021	S108
9	"Luck of the Claw"	Whitney Ralls	June 4, 2021	S110
10	"Hide and Hunt"	Whitney Ralls	June 11, 2021	S109

== Reception ==
Emily Ashby, a reviewer for Common Sense Media, gave the show a 2 (out of 5) star rating. She wrote that "Pinkfong's franchise name carries this show only so far and the lackluster writing and plot can't quite compensate for the rest."

== Film ==
On July 20, 2021, it was announced that Pinkfong and Nickelodeon were developing a Baby Shark movie. In March 2022, it was announced that the film was in development for a 2023 release on Paramount+. On August 4, the film's title, Baby Shark's Big Movie!, and the plot were announced, along with a holiday 2023 release. On November 14, 2023, it was announced that the film would premiere on December 8, 2023, on both Nickelodeon and Paramount+. Besides the principal voice actors, the voice cast consists of Ashley Tisdale, Aparna Nancherla, Ego Nwodim, Chloe Fineman, Enhypen, Lance Bass, Cardi B, Offset, and their children Kulture and Wave.
