= List of Jellystone! characters =

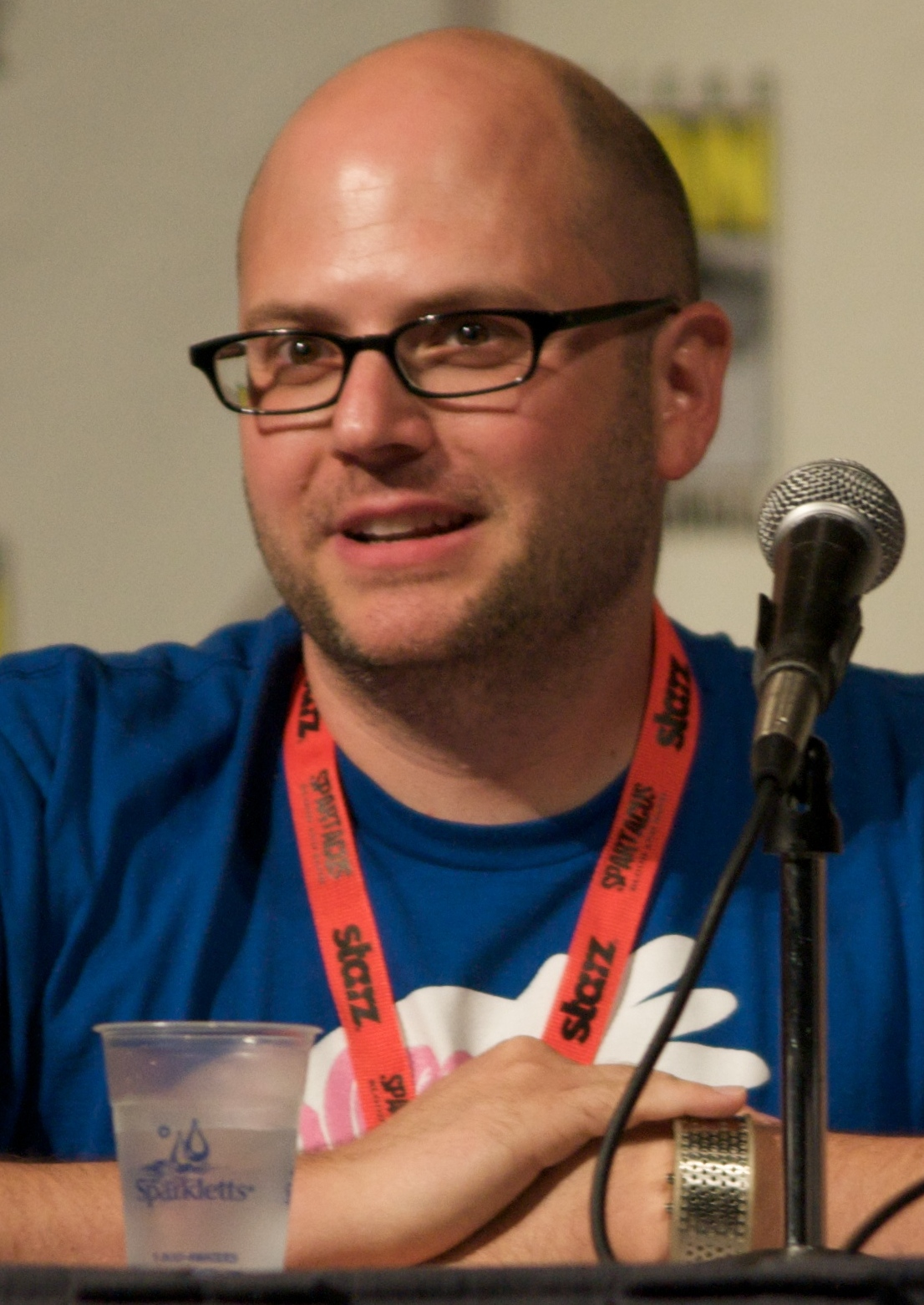
C. H. Greenblatt came up with the idea of rebooting Hanna-Barbera's legacy into a newly founded city.

Jellystone! is an American animated comedy television series created and developed by C. H. Greenblatt for the streaming service HBO Max (currently known as Max). The series is produced by Warner Bros. Animation and features reimagined versions of various characters by Hanna-Barbera. It premiered on July 29, 2021, and ended on March 6, 2025. Below is a list of characters that appear in the show.

== Jellystone Hospital ==
- Yogi Bear (voiced by Jeff Bergman) - A brown bear who is a doctor at Jellystone Hospital. He is self-assured, though a goofball. His first love is food, and crazy schemes will sometimes come into play in order to get his paws on some goodies. Originally from The Huckleberry Hound Show and subsequently The Yogi Bear Show.
- Boo Boo (voiced by C.H. Greenblatt) - A brown bear who is a nurse at Jellystone Hospital. He is Yogi's mild-mannered sidekick, legal spouse (for tax purposes), housemate, and best buddy. Though somewhat meek and less prone to wackiness, he is loyal to his more off-the-wall friends. Originally from The Huckleberry Hound Show and subsequently The Yogi Bear Show.
- Cindy Bear (voiced by Grace Helbig) - A brown bear who is a doctor at Jellystone Hospital and the town's only brilliant scientist. She completes the trio of hospital bears, at times acting as the team's take-charge leader. Unlike her original counterpart, she is intellectual and can invent machines. Originally from The Yogi Bear Show.
- Ranger Smith (voiced by Jeff Bergman) - The hospital administrator. Originally from The Huckleberry Hound Show and subsequently The Yogi Bear Show.
- Winsome Witch (voiced by Lesley Nicol) - A witch who runs the hospital cafeteria. Originally from The Secret Squirrel Show segment with the same name. Unlike her original counterpart, Winnie speaks with a British accent. Her role is significantly reduced in the third season to the point of having almost no speaking lines.

== Jellystone City Hall ==
- Huckleberry Hound (voiced by Jim Conroy) - A Bluetick Coonhound who is the Mayor of Jellystone. Huck is laidback and simplistic - and simple-minded - in his approach to running Jellystone. The town's weekly chaos typically gets a calm reaction from Huckleberry. He was once friends with a cat called Cool Cat who loved Disco and almost destroyed the world with music. Originally from The Huckleberry Hound Show.
- Mr. Jinks (voiced by Jeff Bergman) - A cat who is Mayor Huckleberry Hound's personal assistant. Originally from the "Pixie and Dixie and Mr. Jinks" segment of The Huckleberry Hound Show. His relationship with Pixie and Dixie is unclear at the present.
- Snagglepuss (voiced by Dana Snyder) - An anthropomorphic pink cougar. He also works for Mayor Huckleberry Hound and serves as Jellystone's residential news anchor. He is sometimes mistaken for the Pink Panther. He also hosts different talk shows. Originally from The Quick Draw McGraw Show and The Yogi Bear Show.

== Jellystone Elementary School ==
- El Kabong (voiced by Bernardo de Paula) - A horse and teacher at the school who doubles as the town's own guitar-wielding superhero. Originally from The Quick Draw McGraw Show. Unlike his original counterpart, he is Hispanic and remains in his superhero persona with no hint of an alter ego ever being revealed.
- Augie Doggie (voiced by Georgie Kidder) - An eager young pup who has a close relationship with her father, Doggie Daddy. Unlike her original counterpart, Augie is depicted as a girl in this show. Canonically 11 years old, or 132 months old, in the episode "My Doggie Dave". One of Augie's favorite father-daughter activities is exchanging fifty kisses. Her two best friends are Shag Rugg and Yakky Doodle. Augie's origins were revealed in the episode “The Big Stink” when her father explained why he was not effected by the Stink. Originally from the Augie Doggie and Doggie Daddy segment on The Quick Draw McGraw Show.
- Yakky Doodle (voiced by Katie Grober) - Originally from The Yogi Bear Show segment with the same name. Yakky is depicted as a little girl duck and no longer speaks like Donald Duck. She is an overly cautious worrywart and is best friends with Augie Doggie and Shag Rugg.
- Shag Rugg (voiced by Ron Funches) - One of The Hillbilly Bears, Shag is a cool brown bear cub with a penchant for hip lingo and fun, stylish life. Originally from The Hillbilly Bears segment on The Atom Ant Show.
- Ruff and Reddy (voiced by Oscar Reyez and Jakari Fraser) Originally from The Ruff and Reddy Show. Ruff and Reddy are depicted as a pair of robot kids as a reference to their first adventure in the show, who are a cat and a dog with a bit of a friendly rivalry.
- Lambsy Divey (voiced by Dana Snyder) - A young skateboarder lamb. The episode "Turn your Head and Trough" also reveals he's the head of a secret society called SPOON, and he holds a controlling interest in the utensils industry. Originally from the "It's the Wolf!" segment of Cattanooga Cats.
- Ding-a-Ling Wolf - A small wolf. Originally from the "Hokey Wolf" segment of The Huckleberry Hound Show.
- Caveman "Cavey" Jr. (voiced by Dana Snyder) - A young caveboy and Captain Caveman's son whom he discovers frozen in one of Jellystone's icecaps. Originally from the "Captain Caveman and Son" segment of The Flintstone Kids.

== The Alley ==
- Top Cat (voiced by Thomas Lennon) - A cat who is the slick and conniving leader of the alley cats. He is often seen cooking up schemes to sucker the residents of Jellystone and pocket some quick cash with some of them going awry. Originally from Top Cat.
  - Benny the Ball (voiced by C.H. Greenblatt) - A member of Top Cat's gang. He is also Top Cat's #1 gang member. The only cat members to not have sclera.
  - Choo-Choo (voiced by Jenny Lorenzo) - A member of Top Cat's gang who is depicted as a girl in this show. She is the smartest and tends to land perfectly.
  - Brain (voiced by Georgie Kidder) - A member of Top Cat's gang who retains more of a sarcastic tone and habit of using the word “like” in the middle of sentences (a trait previously attributed to Spook). Like Choo-Choo, she is also depicted as a girl in this show. Brain is also smarter than her original counterpart similar to Brain's portrayal in the Silver Age/Bronze Age comics.
  - Fancy Fancy (voiced by Andrew Frankel) - A member of Top Cat's gang. He is less worried about getting into a relationship unlike his original counterpart.
  - Spooky (voiced by Jenny Lorenzo) - A genderbent version of Spook who is now depicted as the gang's brainless and silent cook. Like Choo-Choo and Brain, she is also depicted as a girl in this show. Spooky is usually seen as an innocent person but judging by most scenes in the show she has a violent nature. Her closed mouth resembles that of the same mouth from Shnitzel, a character from Chowder.
- The King (voiced by Bernardo de Paula) - A cool, Fonzie-like lion who is a rival of Top Cat. Originally from the "Heyyy, It's the King!" segment of CB Bears.
  - Big H - A hippopotamus and member of King's group who is depicted as a girl in this show.
  - Clyde - An orange gorilla and member of King's group.
  - Skids - A bucket-wearing alligator and member of King's group. In the series, Skids is depicted as female.
  - Yuka Yuka - A hyena and member of King's group.

== Jellystone Police Department ==
- Touché Turtle (voiced by Dana Snyder) - A terrapin fencer who is Jellystone's chief of police. Originally from the "Touche Turtle and Dum Dum" segment of The Hanna-Barbera New Cartoon Series. His sidekick from the classic cartoons, Dum Dum the sheepdog, is completely absent from the show and is replaced by fellow dogs Yippee, Yappee and Yahooey.
- Yippee, Yappee and Yahooey (voiced by Jim Conroy, Grace Helbig, and C.H. Greenblatt) - Three silly dog police officers who, like Touche, dress in Musketeer-style clothing and carry around swords. The episode "Lotions 11" reveals that Yahooey has two mothers. Originally from The Peter Potamus Show segment with the same name.

== Jellystone Detective Agency ==
The Jellystone Detective Agency operates in Jellystone's Detective District which is Jellystone's most black and white part of town.

- Snooper and Blabber (voiced by Georgie Kidder and Bernando de Paula) - A cat and mouse detective duo. Originally from the "Snooper and Blabber" segment of The Quick Draw McGraw Show, Snooper here is depicted as female while Blabber retains being male with facial hair who speaks without a lisp.
- Undercover Elephant (voiced by Dana Snyder) - A pachyderm detective. Originally from the CB Bears segment with the same name. Like the show he came from, Undercover Elephant makes use of the disguises that do not work well.
- Inch High (voiced by Fajer Al-Kaisi) - A miniature private investigator. Originally from Inch High, Private Eye.

== Town proprietors ==
- Magilla Gorilla (voiced by Paul F. Tompkins) - A gorilla who is the owner of a haberdashery called "Magilla's", which specializes in bow ties and hats. Originally from The Magilla Gorilla Show. Unlike his earlier counterpart, he is a fashion freak, seeing his clothing style as art, has a slighter lighter and wears a pair of glasses. He is also no longer obsessed with bananas. His high esteem for decor led him to join the secret society SPOON.
  - Jabberjaw (voiced by Niccole Thurman) - A cheerful shark who is Magilla's star employee. She is the daughter of the original Jabberjaw (voiced by C.H. Greenblatt). She is mostly boy-crazy, with a readiness to please the male residents of Jellystone. The reason Jabberjaw pronounces her boss Magilla Gorilla's name as "Ma-JILL-a" is because Jabberjaw's voice actress, Niccole Thurman, initially did not know how to pronounce Magilla's name. The crew decided this fit Jabberjaw's personality and kept the pronunciation. Originally from Jabberjaw.
  - Loopy De Loop (voiced by Ulka Simone Mohanty) - A French-Canadian fox-wolf hybrid who is Jabberjaw's coworker and friend. Like Jabberjaw, she is depicted as a girl. While her original counterpart displayed friendliness and do-good spirit, Loopy is often deadpan and sarcastic, often making such suggestions as burning down the clothing store. Originally from the Loopy De Loop theatrical short series.
- Doggie Daddy (voiced by C.H. Greenblatt) - Augie Doggie's father and an excitable helicopter canine parent who is the lighthouse keeper. Nothing makes Doggie Daddy happier than spending time with his daughter, whom he has a hard time leaving alone. He states that he has no sense of smell because he traded it to a singing sea hag for a daughter. Originally from the "Augie Doggie and Doggie Daddy" segment of The Quick Draw McGraw Show.
- Peter Potamus (voiced by C.H. Greenblatt) - A hippopotamus who is a lonely Otaku and martial arts enthusiast that spends time with his action figures (in lieu of actual friends). Other times, he tries to hang out with the other citizens. In the second season, his occupation was revealed to be a mail carrier for Jellystone's postal service with his balloon as his mode of transportation. Originally from The Peter Potamus Show.
  - So-So (voiced by George Takei) - A monkey who originated in The Peter Potamus Show. So-So is rarely seen in Jellystone, but does appear as Peter's fight trainer in the episode "Jelly Wrestle Rumble". In the second season, he continues to work with Peter Potamus through the town's postal service.
- Squiddly Diddly (voiced by Niccole Thurman) - An octopus who is the proprietor of the music store. Squiddly is depicted as female and speaks with a valley girl accent. Originally from The Secret Squirrel Show segment with the same name.
- Shazzan (voiced by Fajer Al-Kaisi) - A jovial genie who is seen working a variety of vending jobs in Jellystone and also works a ticket seller at the Jellystone Theatre. In the third season, it is revealed that the reason that he works multiple jobs is to pay off his student debt. Originally from Shazzan.
- Jonny Quest and Hadji (voiced by Andrew Frankel and Fajer Al-Kaisi) - The operators of Quest Bowl, a bowling alley. Originally from the Jonny Quest franchise, the two are depicted as adults and a married couple in this show.
- Rugg Family - Shag Rugg's hillbilly family who run the Mud Bug Café. Originally from "The Hillbilly Bears" segment of The Atom Ant Show.
  - Paw Rugg (voiced by Jim Conroy) - A brown bear and Shag Rugg's father whose mumbling is understood by his family. His name is misspelled "Pa Rugg" in the credits.
  - Maw Rugg (voiced by Angelique Perrin) - A brown bear and Shag Rugg's mother.
  - Floral Rugg (voiced by Georgie Kidder) - A yellow bear and Shag Rugg's older sister who works as a waitress at the Mud Bug Café.
- Chopper (voiced by Angelique Perrin) - A bulldog. Originally from the "Yakky Doodle" segment of The Yogi Bear Show. Chopper is depicted as a female and is Yakky Doodle's adoptive canine mother. She is tougher than her daughter and not afraid to be lovingly rough. Chopper is revealed to run the Cattanooga Cheese Explosion pizzeria.
- Morocco Mole (voiced by Dana Snyder) - A fez-wearing, bespectacled mole who runs "Saunas, Sweats & Sandwiches" in response to the fact that people cannot eat sandwiches in a sauna. Originally from Secret Squirrel.
- Thundarr the Barbarian (voiced by Connor Ratliff) - A barbarian who runs the "Lords of Length" barber shop/salon. He and his group were first seen witnessing Captain Caveman's Neanderthal cousins building a party sub that goes into outer space enough to break the Moon. Originally from Thundarr the Barbarian.
  - Ookla the Mok (vocal effects provided by Jeff Bergman) - A Mok and companion of Thundarr the Barbarian. Originally from Thundarr the Barbarian.
  - Princess Ariel (voiced by C.H. Greenblatt) - A magic-using companion of Thundarr the Barbarian. Originally from Thundarr the Barbarian. Unlike her original form, Ariel mumbles with a soft voice, making her somewhat difficult to understand.
- The Herculoids - A family with pets that run a "tomatoroid" farm from which they make highly regarded marinara sauce. The farm is some distance from Jellystone, located at the edge of nowhere. Originally from The Herculoids. Unlike their original forms, the Herculoids speak with hillbilly accents.
  - Zandor (voiced by Maxwell Atoms) - The patriarch of the family. He was first seen on a TV show hugging Gleep.
  - Tara (voiced by Niccole Thurman) - Zandor's wife. Unlike her original version, Tara appears to be illiterate.
  - Domo (voiced by C.H. Greenblatt) - Zandor and Tara's son. He has a primitive look on his face because he got kicked by a Precambrian Mule.
  - Igoo (voiced by Fajer Al-Kaisi) - A gigantic stone gorilla.
  - Tundro (voiced by Jeff Bergman) - A rhinoceros/Triceratops hybrid with ten legs who can shoot projectiles from a horn.
  - Zok - A flying dragon who can shoot lasers from his eyes and tail.
  - Gloop (voiced by Ulka Simone Mohanty) - A big protoplasmic creature. Unlike his original version, Gloop is the same size as Gleep.
  - Gleep (voiced by Fajer Al-Kaisi) - A protoplasmic creature. Unlike the original version, Gleep is portrayed as female.

== Other Jellystone townsfolk ==
- Captain Caveman/Barney Rubble (voiced by Jim Conroy) - A fun-loving caveman who often hangs out with the likes of Yogi Bear and Jabberjaw. Captain Caveman lives in a van whose interior resembles a cave. The episode "Better Off Fred" revealed that Captain Caveman was originally Barney Rubble. Originally from Captain Caveman and the Teen Angels.
- Wally Gator (voiced by Jeff Bergman) - A cheerful dimwitted alligator who is a recurring patient at Jellystone Hospital. In the third season, he and Winsome Witch are implied to be in a relationship. Originally from The Hanna-Barbera New Cartoon Series segment with the same name.
- Bobbie Looey (voiced by Jenny Lorenzo) - Based on Baba Looey from The Quick Draw McGraw Show. Unlike Baba, Bobbie is a well-spoken business burro and is a lady. She is Cuban rather than Mexican, and now works for the government.
- The Banana Splits - Originating from The Banana Splits Adventure Hour, the Banana Splits are depicted as hardened yet cartoonish criminals that clash with El Kabong and make their hideout at the abandoned Oversized Cartoon Prop Warehouse. At one point, they recalled that they used to be cool. They only appeared in the first two seasons.
  - Fleegle (voiced by Paul F. Tompkins) - A beagle who is the Banana Splits' leader. Unlike his live-action counterpart and his animated counterpart in The Banana Splits in Hocus Pocus Park, his tongue does not hang out of his mouth while he speaks nor does he speak in a lisp.
  - Bingo (voiced by Jim Conroy) - An orange ape and member of the Banana Splits. In this show, he is shown to be the largest of the group.
  - Drooper (voiced by C.H. Greenblatt) - A lion and member of the Banana Splits.
  - Snorky - An elephant and member of the Banana Splits that mostly makes honking sounds.
- The Great Grape Ape (voiced by C.H. Greenblatt) - A purple 40 ft. gorilla who lives somewhere near Jellystone. In "Jellystone: The Boardgame", Grape Ape is made the Director of Moving Large Objects. Originally from The Great Grape Ape Show.
- Granny Sweet (voiced by Grace Helbig) - A kindly elderly woman who is the town's judge. Originally from the "Precious Pupp" segment of The Atom Ant Show.
  - Bristle Hound - A sheep dog from the "It's the Wolf" segment of Cattanooga Cats who is the court bailiff.
- Lippy the Lion and Hardy Har Har (voiced by Jeff Bergman and Jenny Lorenzo) - A lion and a hyena duo. Unlike their original counterparts, Lippy and Hardy are depicted as an elderly Jewish couple with Hardy's gender-switched. Originally from The Hanna-Barbera New Cartoon Series segment with the same name.
- Mildew Wolf (voiced by Bernardo de Paula) - A flamboyant wolf. In the episode "Grocery Store", Mildew attempts to flirt with Shazzan, indicating that the character is portrayed as a gay person (possibly as a nod to Mildew's original voice actor Paul Lynde who often poked fun at his barely closeted homosexuality). Originally from the "It's the Wolf!" segment of Cattanooga Cats.
- Brenda Chance, Dee Dee Sykes, and Taffy Dare (voiced by Georgie Kidder, Niccole Thurman, and Grace Helbig) - Formerly Captain Caveman's teammates in Captain Caveman and the Teen Angels, these three are seen working various jobs at Jellystone including receptionists at the Jellystone Hospital and newscasters. Dee Dee is also seen working at the Cattanooga Cheese Explosion. Taffy Dare becomes a mother in season 3.
- Pixie (voiced by Jenny Lorenzo) and Dixie - A pair of mice who are always seen together. Though they are rarely seen in Jellystone as they are very small, it's merely implied in "Baby Shenanigans" that they work at a candy store. Dixie is also gender-switched in this show. Originally from the "Pixie and Dixie and Mr. Jinks" segment of The Huckleberry Hound Show.
- Kwicky Koala (voiced by Paul F. Tompkins) - A koala. Some of his appearances have Kwicky wearing a flower near his ear. Originally from The Kwicky Koala Show.
- Speed Buggy (voiced by Jim Conroy) - A dune buggy with working facial features.
  - Tinker (voiced by Dana Snyder) - Speed Buggy's driver.
- J. Whimple Dimple (voiced by Paul F. Tompkins) - An elderly resident of Jellystone whom Top Cat was scamming. In "Jailcation", J. Whimple Dimple was seen on the tracks juggling a bunch of babies. In "Turn Your Head and Trough", he's a member of SPOON. Originally from The Magilla Gorilla Show episode "Big Game" where he was a hunter.
- Atom Ant - A tiny ant with incredible physical strength. Though he is rarely seen in the series due to his size, he was briefly seen helping out with the wrestling match in "Jelly Wrestle Rumble!" He never spoke in the show. Originally from The Atom Ant Show.
- Dirty Dawg (voiced by Jeff Bergman) - A vagrant Labrador Retriever who is a caricature artist and an old friend of Lippy and Hardy. Originally from The Kwicky Koala Show segment with the same name.
- Tubb (voiced by Dana Snyder) - A scuba diver. Originally from the "Moby Dick" segment of Moby Dick and Mighty Mightor. He is depicted as an adult and has a German accent in this version.
- Kaboobie - A flying camel and friend of Shazzan who transports him to Biskitt Farms theme park in "Sha-Zogi". Originally from Shazzan.

== Background Jellystone townsfolk ==
These characters appear in town sporadically, but do not seem to have much of a function so far:

- Hokey Wolf - A wolf originally from The Huckleberry Hound Show segment with the same name. Currently only involved whenever there is a big crowd, particularly in the second season. His relationship with Ding-a-Ling is also unclear at present.
- The Hair Bear Bunch - Originally the stars of Help!... It's the Hair Bear Bunch!
  - Hair Bear - Leader of the Hair Bear Bunch.
  - Square Bear - The largest member of the Hair Bear Bunch.
  - Bubi Bear - The smallest member of the Hair Bear Bunch.
- The CB Bears - Originally the stars of CB Bears.
  - Hustle - A brown bear who is the leader of the C.B. Bears.
  - Bump - A small blue bear who is a member of the C.B. Bears.
  - Boogie - A tall brown bear with a trash can lid on his head and yellow hair who is a member of the C.B. Bears.

== New Bedrock ==
New Bedrock is Jellystone's rival town. The word "Bedrock" makes a reference to The Flintstones.

- Dick Dastardly (voiced by Dwight Schultz) - The Mayor of New Bedrock. Originally from Wacky Races.
  - Muttley (voiced by Dana Snyder) - Dick Dastardly's dog sidekick. Originally from Wacky Races.
- The Really Rottens - A team of villains residing in New Bedrock who work for Mayor Dick Dastardly. This team was originally from Laff-A-Lympics.
  - Daisy Mayhem (voiced by Georgie Kidder) - A hillbilly woman and member of the Really Rottens who is the "maiden of destruction". Originally from the Laff-A-Lympics segment of Scooby's All Star Laff-A-Lympics.
    - Sooey - The pet pig of Daisy Mayhem. Originally from the Laff-A-Lympics segment of Scooby's All Stars.
  - Dinky Dalton (voiced by Dwight Schultz in "LAFF Games", Rob Riggle in "El Kabong Along With Me") - A towering outlaw cowboy and member of the Really Rottens. Originally from The Quick Draw McGraw Show.
  - Dirty Dalton - An outlaw cowboy who is the brother of Dinky Dalton. Originally from The Quick Draw McGraw Show.
  - Dastardly Dalton - An outlaw cowboy who is the brother of Dinky Dalton and Dastardly Dalton. Originally from The Quick Draw McGraw Show.
  - Mrs. Creepley - A creepy macabre woman. Originally from the Laff-A-Lympics segment of Scooby's All Stars.
    - Orful Octopus (voiced by Bernardo de Paula) - An octopus owned by Mrs. Creepley who is described to have "the stickiest tentacles in the west". Originally from the Laff-A-Lympics segment of Scooby's All Stars.
  - The Great Fondoo - An evil magician. Originally from the Laff-A-Lympics segment of Scooby's All Stars.
    - Magic Rabbit (voiced by Niccole Thurman) - The pet rabbit of The Great Fondoo. Originally from the Laff-A-Lympics segment of Scooby's All Stars. Unlike the previous version of the character, Magic Rabbit can actually say more words.
- Klunk (voiced by Fajer Al-Kaisi in the first appearance, Jim Conroy in the second appearance) - A criminal who steals Jabberjaw's ice cream and is defeated by El Kabong. He is also the coach of the New Bedrock Children's Robotics Team at the Jelly Robo Battle Royale as seen in the titular episode. Originally from Dastardly and Muttley in Their Flying Machines. Unlike the previous version of the character, Klunk does say some occasional words.
- Scrappy-Doo (voiced by C.H. Greenblatt) - He appears on a milk carton Cindy drinks. His cameo is a reference to his lack of appearances due to his reception. Scrappy-Doo later makes his physical debut in Season 3 as a student of New Bedrock Academy in "Jelly Robo Battle Royale" who is a member of their New Bedrock Children's Robotics Team and later makes another cameo placing 3rd in a dog show in "Crisis on Infinite Mirths". Originally from Scooby-Doo and Scrappy-Doo.
- Rocky Ratrock (voiced by Dana Snyder) - A caveboy student at New Bedrock Academy and a member of their New Bedrock Children's Robotics Team. Originally from The Flintstone Kids.
- Gobby Gruesome - A student at New Bedrock Academy and a member of their New Bedrock Children's Robotics Team. Originally from The Flintstones.

== Guest characters ==
- Axel - A skeleton who is attached to Winsome Witch's race car in the episode "Face of the Town". Originally from the "Fender Bender 500" segment of Wake, Rattle, and Roll.
- Baby Puss - A saber-toothed tiger who battles Captain Caveman and Cavey Jr. in the episode "Ice Ice Daddy". Originally from The Flintstones. Here, Baby Puss is depicted as more sinister.
- The Biskitts (one voiced by Dana Snyder) - The mascots for various food and drink products sold in Jellystone as well as a Biskitt Farms theme park.
- Fred Flintstone (voiced by Jeff Bergman) - The episode "Better Off Fred" is centered around an attempt at cloning him when Captain Caveman remembered his identity of Barney Rubble and Cindy helped clone him back to life. However, this created a clone with a personality like the Mogwai from Gremlins that went on a rampage in Jellystone. It was later revealed that Fred treated Barney like a second-class caveman. A memorium is seen of the original Fred Flintstone (who was born on February 2, 10,042 BCE and died on February 8, 10,000 BCE). Originally from The Flintstones.
- Barney Rubble (voiced by Paul F. Tompkins) - His voice can be heard during the movie Revenge of the Gruesomes in "Uh Oh! It's a Burglar!" A different version would later be revealed as Captain Caveman's true identity in "Better Off Fred". Originally from The Flintstones.
- Wilma Flintstone - She was also seen on the cover of a book that the book club read about in "Must Be Jelly". Originally from The Flintstones.
- The Clue Club - Featured in a cutaway in the episode "A Coconut to Remember" and appeared in "Frankenhooky" where they were impersonated by a bunch of Frankenstein monsters. Unlike their original counterparts, Larry, D.D., and Sheriff Bagley are depicted as dark-skinned people in this show.
  - Larry (voiced by C.H. Greenblatt)
  - Pepper (voiced by Grace Helbig)
  - D.D.
  - Dottie
  - Sheriff Bagley - A sheriff who is the law enforcement contact of the Clue Club.
  - Woofer (voiced by C.H. Greenblatt) and Wimper - The dog mascots of Clue Club.
- Mr. Peebles - From The Magilla Gorilla Show where he ran a pet shop that acted as Magilla's home. Mr. Peebles is referenced in Jellystone through a few photographs from Magilla's past, but their relationship is not made clear. Mr. Peebles was seen in person in "The Brave Little Daddy" playing in the orchestra at the time when Doggie Daddy was attempting to discipline Grape Ape.
- Quack-Up (voiced by Fajer Al-Kaisi) - A goofy duck who tries to sell Augie Doggie insurance in the episode "Grocery Store". Originally from Yogi's Space Race and Galaxy Goof-Ups.
- The Neptunes - Consisting of Biff, Bubbles, Clamhead, and Shelly, they are Jabberjaw's former bandmates. Shelly is the most recurring one as she is often seen working as a cashier at Barbera's.
- Bleep (voiced by Jim Conroy) - An alien who pays visits in the episodes "Mr. Flabby Dabby Wabby Jabby" and "Bleep". In this show, Bleep can be vicious if given something with hot sauce. Originally from Josie and the Pussycats in Outer Space.
- Glump (voiced by Fajer Al-Kaisi) - A Stegosaurus who specifically refers to himself as "Glump, from the Valley of the Dinosaurs". He is seen as Top Cat's therapy patient in the episode "Ice Ice Daddy" where he talks about getting over his fear of meteors before a fragment of rock strikes their session. Unlike his original self who was merely a pet animal, Glump is anthropomorphic and capable of speech in this show. Glump made a cameo in "Epic Rager" when Captain Caveman mentioned that he and Glump barely escaped with their lives when his cousins' epic rager led to their big ice cream sundae causing the Ice Age.
- The Cattanooga Cats - Consisting of Country (voiced by Scott Whyte), Kitty Jo (voiced by Georgie Kidder), Scoots, and Groove, the rock band is depicted as singing animatronics at the Cattanooga Cheese Explosion that are similar to The Rock-afire Explosion band and Munch's Make-Believe Band at Chuck E. Cheese. Their dog Teeny Tim is depicted as a robot waiter in the show. The horror theme is similar to Five Nights at Freddy's.
- The Funky Phantom (voiced by Paul F. Tompkins) - A ghost who was formerly a famous wrestler and Mayor Huckleberry Hound's childhood hero. The Funky Phantom now works as an avocado salesman. In "Jailcation", the Funky Phantom appears as an inmate at Santo Relaxo.
- Mightor (voiced by Jim Conroy) - The Funky Phantom's caveman wrestling opponent in the Phantom's infamous final match. Originally from the "Mighty Mightor" segment of Moby Dick and Mighty Mightor.
- Gravity Girl - A character from "The Galaxy Trio" segment of Birdman and the Galaxy Trio who is a wrestling referee.
- The Great Gazoo (voiced by Flula Borg) - A sociopathic green alien who hosts the virtual reality game "BuddyBlasters" in the episode "Gotta Kiss Them All". Originally from The Flintstones. He becomes a background character in season 2 as seen in "The Sea Monster of Jellystone Cove". The Great Gazoo was later seen in "Beffer Off Fred" as part of a memorium of the original Fred Flintstone where a picture had him harressed by Fred.
- Yankee Doodle Pigeon - A carrier pigeon who appears in Yogi Bear's movie in the episode "A Town Video: Welcome to Jellystone". Yankee then appears in the background in multiple episodes. Originally from Dastardly and Muttley in Their Flying Machines.
- Ghost Team - A group of superheroes who wear inviso-belts.
  - Space Ghost (voiced by Paul F. Tompkins in season 2, George Lowe in season 3) - A ghost-themed galactic superhero whose Phantom Cruiser ends up in a collision with Bleep's ship, and the host of Space Ghost Coast to Coast and Cartoon Planet. He later appeared in "Space Con" with his team. Originally from Space Ghost.
  - Jan and Jace (voiced by Georgie Kidder and Andy Merrill) - Space Ghost's sidekicks. Originally from Space Ghost
  - Blip (vocal effects provided by Jeff Bergman) - Jan and Jace's pet monkey. Originally from Space Ghost
- Moby Dick (voiced by Paul F. Tompkins in the first appearance, Dana Snyder in the second appearance) - A white sperm whale who lives in the waters of Jellystone Cove. Originally from the "Moby Dick" segment of Moby Dick and Mighty Mightor.
- Weirdly Gruesome - He appeared in the movie Revenge of the Gruesomes in "Uh Oh! It's a Burglar!" Originally from The Flintstones.
- Dino - He appeared as a playground toy. Originally from The Flintstones.
- Orbity (vocal effects provided by Ulka Simone Mohanty) - He appeared as a playground toy in season two and his design is later used to portray the Inner Cupids. Originally from The Jetsons.
- Zorak (voiced by Jim Conroy) - A Dokarian mantis who is a villain of Space Ghost, but later the sidekick and musician of Space Ghost Coast to Coast, and the co-host of Cartoon Planet. Originally from Space Ghost.
- Brak (voiced by Andy Merrill) - A cat-like alien who is a villain of Space Ghost, but later the sidekick and a supported character from Space Ghost Coast to Coast and the co-host of Cartoon Planet. Originally from Space Ghost.
- Secret Squirrel (voiced by Dana Snyder) - He was seen on a movie poster for "The Blow-ening!" in "It's a Mad Mad Mad Rat Race". Secret Squirrel later shows up in person in "Spy Thriller".
- Dread Baron - An inmate at Santo Relaxo. Originally from the Laff-A-Lympics segment of Scooby's All Star Laff-A-Lympics.
- Hilarious P. Prankster - A jester-themed criminal who is an inmate at Santo Relaxo. In "Heroes and Capes", Hilarious P. Prankster was shown to have been defeated by Yogi Bear in his Super Yogi alias only to slip away while Super Yogi was distracted. Originally from Yogi's Gang.
- Creeper - Top Cat posed as the prison guard Creeper when his gang were sent to Santo Paino until Top Cat secretly rerouted them to Santo Relaxo. Originally from Scooby-Doo, Where Are You!
- Scare Bear - He appears on the Lil' Professional badge. Originally from Yogi's Space Race and Galaxy Goof-Ups.
- Sky Pirates - A group of sky pirates that operate over the skies of Jellystone. Originally from Yogi's Gang.
  - Captain Swashbuckle Swipe (voiced by Bernardo de Paula) - The captain of the sky pirates.
  - Lotta Litter (voiced by Georgie Kidder) - Member of the sky pirates who is the first lady of filth. She specializes in throwing garbage at anyone.
  - Mr. Smog (voiced by C.H. Greenblatt) - Member of the sky pirates. He specializes in smog attacks.
  - Gossipy Witch of the West (voiced by Dana Snyder) - A witch and member of the sky pirates who tells gossip. Originally from Yogi's Gang.
- Blue Falcon (voiced by Rob Riggle) - A falcon-themed superhero who pretends to be buff due to the inflations in his superhero outfit. Originally from The Scooby-Doo/Dynomutt Hour segment: Dynomutt, Dog Wonder.
  - Dynomutt - Blue Falcon's robotic canine sidekick. Originally from The Scooby-Doo/Dynomutt Hour segment Dynomutt, Dog Wonder.
- Mr. Hothead - He was seen running from Mayor Huckleberry Hound in his Armored Mayor alias. Originally from Yogi's Gang.
- Moltar (voiced by Bernardo de Paula) - Moltar was seen on the cover of the book "Moltar's Big Book of Fables and Slow Cooker Recipes" that Wally Gator wanted to take out of the library. In season three, Moltar disguises himself as Meteor Man as part of a plot to attack Space Ghost at a convention. Originally a villain from Space Ghost, and then the director in Space Ghost Coast to Coast and the original host of Toonami.
- The Jetsons - A futuristic family. Originally from the series of the same name.
  - George Jetson (voiced by Jeff Bergman) - The patriarch of the Jetson family.
  - Jane Jetson (voiced by Annie Mumolo) - George's wife.
  - Judy Jetson (voiced by Georgie Kidder) - George's daughter.
  - Elroy Jetson - George's son. Elroy is mute in this version.
  - Astro (vocal effects provided by Ron Funches) - The Jetsons' pet dog.
  - Rosie (voiced by Annie Mumolo) - The robot maid. A bunch of her were made by Spacely Space Sprockets run by that time period's Bobbie Louie and nearly caused a robot apocalypse before Bobbie talked everyone into wearing down their batteries by taking advantage of their service programming.
- Cool Cat (voiced by Dana Snyder) - A cat and Huckleberry Hound's old friend who was into disco where the booty bumps he caused spreads disco fever to anyone. Originally from the Heyyy, It's the King! episode "The King and His Jokers" where he was depicted as a rival of King. He has an American accent rather than an Australian accent in this series.
- Ghost Clown - He appears on a photo in "Disco Fever". Originally from Scooby-Doo, Where Are You!.
- The Ghost Chasers - A mystery solving team whose members who impersonated by some of the Really Rottens in "Frankenhooky". Originally from Goober and the Ghost Chasers.
  - Goober - The animal mascot of the Ghost Chasers.
  - Ted (voiced by Dana Snyder) - The leader of the Ghost Chasers who was impersonated by Orful Octopus.
  - Tina (voiced by Jenny Lorenzo) - The female member of the Ghost Chasers who was impersonated by Magic Rabbit.
  - Gilly (voiced by C.H. Greenblatt) - A bespectacled member of the Ghost Chasers who was impersonated by Sooey.
- Mystery Inc. - The famous mystery-solving team who was impersonated by some characters in "Frankenhooky". Initially, they were depicted as characters starring in the show-within-a-show titled Scooby-Doo. Originally from Scooby-Doo, Where Are You!
  - Scooby-Doo - The animal mascot of Mystery Inc. He was revealed to have been impersonated by the cotton ball jar.
  - Shaggy Rogers (voiced by Matthew Lillard) - A member of Mystery Inc. He was impersonated by Tubb and a Tiny Yogi in "Frankenhooky".
  - Fred Jones (voiced by Frank Welker) - A member of Mystery Inc. He was impersonated by Ranger Smith and the character from Yogi's video game in "Frankenhooky".
  - Daphne Blake - A member of Mystery Inc. She was impersonated by Hardy Har Har and Tubb's arm in "Frankenhooky".
  - Velma Dinkley (voiced by Kate Micucci) - A bespectacled member of Mystery Inc. She was impersonated by Cindy Bear in "Frankenhooky".
- Elektra (voiced by Ulka Simone Mohanty) - An actress who stars in the titular Jellystone Television show in "Girl, You My Friend!" She has electric powers rather than psychic powers in this series. Originally from the "Teen Force" segment of Space Stars.
- Flirtacia (voiced by Georgie Kidder) - A Lilliputian actress who stars in the titular Jellystone Television show in "Girl, You My Friend"! Flirtacia also appears to drop the flag to start the featured race in "Lil' Honk Honks" until the ants took her away. Originally from The Adventures of Gulliver.
- Zelda the Ostrich (voiced by Niccole Thurman) - An ostrich actress who stars the titular Jellystone Television show in "Girl, You My Friend"! Originally from the "Heyyy, It's the King!" segment of CB Bears.
- Charlie the Robot (voiced by Dana Snyder) - A robot actor who stars in the titular Jellystone Television show in "Girl, You My Friend"! Originally from Scooby-Doo, Where Are You!.
- The Red Guy (voiced by Dana Snyder) - A devil residing in the bad place. He was seen in "Vote Raspberry" where he was hit in the eye by Mr. Jinks' graph that told how low Mayor Huckleberry's approval ratings are. He returns in "Crisis on Infinite Mirths". Originally from Cow and Chicken and its spin-off/former segment I Am Weasel.
- Hong Kong Phooey (voiced by Ron Funches) - The star of a martial arts film franchise as seen in "Collection Protection". Originally from Hong Kong Phooey.
- Spot (voiced by Bernardo de Paula) - He is portrayed as a buff talking cat and Hong Kong Phooey's brother. Originally from Hong Kong Phooey.
- Sergeant Flint - A supporting character in Hong Kong Phooey's films. Originally from Hong Kong Phooey where he was the police sergeant.
- Rosemary (voiced by Georgie Kidder) - A supporting character in Hong Kong Phooey's films. Originally from Hong Kong Phooey where she worked as the police department's telephone operator.
- Little Rok (voiced by SungWon Cho) - An anime fan and proprietor of Little Rok's Big Museum of Anime and Manga Memorabilia who is Peter Potamus' anime collection rival as seen in "Collection Protection". Originally from the "Mightor" segment of Moby Dick and Mighty Mightor.
  - Ork (vocal effects provided by Jeff Bergman) - Little Rok's pet bird. Originally from the "Mightor" segment of Moby Dick and Mighty Mightor.
- Dr. Benton Quest - Shown in a picture in "Mummy Knows Best" and appears in person in "Snowdodio". Originally from Jonny Quest.
- Race Bannon (voiced by Diedrich Bader) - Shown in a picture in "Mummy Knows Best" and appears in person in "Snowdodio" where he had his suspicion on the visiting snowmen. Originally from Jonny Quest.
- Bandit - Shown in a picture in "Mummy Knows Best". Originally from Jonny Quest.
- Lokar - An insectoid who made a brief cameo at the sci-fi convention in "Space Con". Originally from Space Ghost.
- Sneezly Seal (voiced by Bernardo de Paula) - A seal. He appears in a commercial for the titular car-building set in "Lil' Honk Honks" and appears in person in "Snowdodio". Originally from the "Breezly and Sneezly" segment of The Peter Potamus Show.
- Buzz Conroy - He appears in a commercial for the titular car-building set in "Lil' Honk Honks". Originally from the "Frankenstein Jr." segment of Frankenstein Jr. and The Impossibles.
- Birdman - Shown in a picture in "Epic Rager" where a memorial is set up for Birdman who died in Jellystone's fight against the sewer people as Boo Boo states that his sacrifice will not be in vain. Originally from the "Birdman" segment of Birdman and the Galaxy Trio.
- Scooby-Dum - The former mayor of Jellystone who was mentioned by Mayor Huckleberry Hound to have been impeached in "Epic Rager". Originally from The Scooby-Doo/Dynomutt Hour segment The Scooby-Doo Show.
- The Cave Family - A group of Neanderthal cavepeople who are Captain Caveman's cousins that appear in "Epic Rager" and are described by him to be the original party animals as they are unfrozen from their block of ice to help turn the Jellystone Plaza party into an epic rager which only ends when a big disaster strikes. Originally from Valley of the Dinosaurs which was also the name of the location where they are from.
  - Gorok (voiced by Paul F. Tompkins) - The patriarch of the Cave Family. His name was misspelled "Gork" in the credits.
  - Gara (voiced by Niccole Thurman) - Gorok's wife.
  - Lok (voiced by Paul F. Tompkins) - Gorok's son.
  - Tana (voiced by Grace Helbig) - Gorok's daughter.
- Dino Boy (voiced by C.H. Greenblatt) - He appears in a commercial for the titular car-building set in "Lil' Honk Honks" and later appears in "Epic Rager" showing up late to the epic rager. Originally from the "Dino Boy in the Lost Valley" segment of Space Ghost.
  - Ugh (voiced by Jim Conroy) - A caveman who appears in "Epic Rager". Originally from the "Dino Boy in the Lost Valley" segment of Space Ghost.
  - Bronty (vocal effects provided by Ulka Simone Mohanty) - A young Brontosaurus who serves as Dino Boy and Ugh's mode of transportation. Originally from the "Dino Boy in the Lost Valley" segment of Space Ghost.
- Breezly Bruin - A polar bear. He appears in "Snowdodio". Originally from the "Breezly and Sneezly" segment of The Peter Potamus Show.
- Chief (voiced by Jim Conroy) - An African buffalo that is Secret Squirrel's boss. Originally from the "Super Super Secret Squirrel" segment of 2 Stupid Dogs.
- Penny (voiced by Niccole Thurman) - A squirrel that works as a loose cannon agent. Originally from the "Super Super Secret Squirrel" segment of 2 Stupid Dogs.
- Metalus - A robotic villain who is a double agent in the "Secret Squirrel" films. Originally from Space Ghost.
- Nugget Nose (voiced by Dana Snyder) - The proprietor of the store on Dad's Gifts Island in "Chair Me Matey". Originally from The Galloping Ghost segment of Yogi's Space Race where he was the ghost of an ornery prospector, but here he's portrayed as still alive in this show.
- The Vulture People - A race of ancient people who were accidentally revived by Cindy when she quoted "Ringo Zingo". Originally from the "Mighty Mightor" segment of Moby Dick and Mighty Mightor.
  - Vulture People Leader (voiced by Fajer Al-Kaisi) - The leader of the Vulture People who is much different from Vultar in the "Mighty Mightor" segment of Moby Dick and Mighty Mightor.
- The Stone People - A race of ancient people accidentally revived by Cindy. Originally from the "Mighty Mightor" segment of Moby Dick and Mighty Mightor.
  - Rog (voiced by Niccole Thurman) - The leader of the Stone People who is depicted as female in this show.
- Ernie Devlin (voiced by Kyle Bornheimer) - A motorcycle stuntman who forms the Devlin Crew with his younger siblings. Originally from Devlin. Unlike his original version, Ernie has never successfully completed a stunt and he has a large gap in his teeth.
  - Tod Devlin (voiced by Jim Conroy) - Ernie's younger brother who does the filming and the maintenance work, particularly emptying the RV's septic tank which is a stunt within itself. Originally from Devlin.
  - Sandy Devlin (voiced by Georgie Kidder) - Ernie's younger sister provides him with medical care, even though she's only a little girl. Originally from Devlin.
- Mushmouse and Punkin' Puss (voiced by C.H. Greenblatt and Dana Snyder) - A hillybilly mouse and cat who go to Jellystone "for the work and the indoor plumbing" when interviewed by Mayor Huckleberry Hound. They also tell him that they are surprised by the stunt show in "The Mountain Jumpers". Originally from the "Punkin' Puss & Mushmouse" segment of the Magilla Gorilla Show
- Tom and Scooby (voiced by C.H. Greenblatt and Ulka Simone Mohanty) - In this show, Scooby is Jabberjaw's sister even though she's a seal. She marries Tom, portrayed here as an adult human with a Swedish accent. Both once formed a team with Tubb and Moby Dick before Tom and Tubb had a falling out over Scooby. Though Jabberjaw helps get them back together. Originally from the "Moby Dick" segment of Moby Dick and Mighty Mightor.
- Captain Michael Murphy (voiced by Jim Conroy) - The captain of Sealab where Tom and Scooby's wedding takes place. He officiates the wedding between Tom and Scooby. Originally from Sealab 2020 and its Adult Swim parody Sealab 2021.
- Jabberjaw Sr. (voiced by C.H. Greenblatt) - The father of Jabberjaw who has the same mannerisms as the original depiction of the character.
- Frankenstein Jr. (voiced by Jim Conroy) - A robot that Cindy Bear builds for the Jellystone team to fight in the Jelly Robo Battle Royale. Originally from the "Frankenstein Jr." segment of Frankenstein Jr. and The Impossibles
- Wheelie (voiced by Brian Posehn) - A living car that can talk. He works for a "friend app" and was inadvertently hired by Yogi. Originally from Wheelie and the Chopper Bunch, although this version can talk while the original version could only honk his horn.
- Lady Constance (voiced by C.H. Greenblatt) - The most fanatical member of the secret society known as SPOON. Originally from the "Three Musketeers" segment of the Banana Splits Adventure Hour.
- Gemini (voiced by Paul F. Tompkins) - A cyborg wizard and Thundarr's archenemy with a rotating double-sided head who tries to get two hair cuts, one for each face, for the price of one. Originally from Thundarr the Barbarian.
- Alfy Gator (voiced by Maxwell Atoms) - An alligator based on Alfred Hitchcock who hosts a marinara sauce cook-off between the Herculoids and a team of Jellystone residents. Originally from the "Yakky Doodle" segment of The Yogi Bear Show.
- Demon of Ur/Kevin - A demon that takes the form of a human-sized lizard. He creates theme songs for people that reveal their true selves if they offer a piece of their souls to him. Originally from The Buford Files segment of Yogi's Space Race. The Demon's appearance is notable in that characters repeatedly refer to his original version.

=== Appearing in Crisis on Infinite Mirths ===
This is a list of the Cartoon Network characters appearing in the crossover "Crisis on Infinite Mirths".

- Chowder - Mung Daal's young apprentice who is a cat/bear/rabbit hybrid. He has a large appetite and eats anything, even a customer's order. Originally from Chowder.
- Shnitzel - A rock monster and professional chef who works at a catering company in Marzipan City, as well as Mung Daal's assistant, who only speaks "Radda". Originally from Chowder.
- Truffles (voiced by Tara Strong) - Mung Daal's mushroom pixie wife. Originally from Chowder.
- Big Dog and Little Dog - An Old English sheepdog and a dachshund. Originally from 2 Stupid Dogs.
- Dexter (voiced by Candi Milo) - A boy genius who has a laboratory and is Dee Dee's younger brother. Originally from Dexter's Laboratory.
- Dee Dee (voiced by Kat Cressida) - Dexter's older sister who annoys him a lot. Originally from Dexter's Laboratory.
- Monkey (vocal effects provided by Frank Welker) - Dexter's pet monkey with a superhero identity. Originally from Dexter's Laboratory.
- Major Glory (voiced by Rob Paulsen) - The patriotic leader of the Justice Friends. Originally from Dexter's Laboratory.
- Mandark - Dexter's rival. Originally from Dexter's Laboratory.
- Johnny Bravo (voiced by Jeff Bennett) - A man who tries to look for a lady, but ends up in bizarre situations. Originally from Johnny Bravo.
- Cow and Chicken - A cow and a chicken who often get antagonized by The Red Guy. Originally from the series of the same name.
- I.R. Baboon - A baboon who does dumb antics and who also gets antagonized by The Red Guy. He is also envious of I.M. Weasel and acts as frenemy to him, constantly trying to do better than he does. Originally from Cow and Chicken and I Am Weasel.
- The Powerpuff Girls - A group of three girls, made by their creator and father, Professor Utonium, in an attempt to make the perfect little girls; after accidentally mixing in Chemical X, he made three superheroines who fight evil. Originally from the series of the same name.
  - Blossom (voiced by Catherine Cavadini) - The leader of the group whose personality ingredient is "everything nice."
  - Bubbles (voiced by Tara Strong) - The youngest girl in the group whose personality ingredient is sugar.
    - A version of Bubbles from the 2016 reboot appears. It was requested by original series creator Craig McCracken in a blink-and-you'll-miss-it moment, were the original 1998 Bubbles takes down her 2016 counterpart, likely because the 2016 reboot was hated by longtime fans of the original series.
  - Buttercup (voiced by E.G. Daily) - The feistiest girl in the group whose personality ingredient is spice.
- Mojo Jojo (voiced by Roger L. Jackson) - A villainous, intelligent mutated chimpanzee and mad scientist who is constantly plotting to take over the world and/or destroy the Powerpuff Girls. Originally from The Powerpuff Girls.
- Mayor of Townsville (voiced by Tom Kenny) - The short mayor of the city of Townsville who loves pickles. Originally from The Powerpuff Girls.
- Ace (voiced by Jeff Bennett) - The leader of the Gangreen Gang. Originally from The Powerpuff Girls.
- "Him" - A mysterious, demonic villain who is so evil, so sinister, and so horribly vile that even the utterance of his name strikes fear into the hearts of men. Originally from The Powerpuff Girls.
- Narrator (voiced by Tom Kenny) - An unseen voiceover narrator who serves as comic relief and occasionally becomes involved in the Powerpuff Girls' events. Originally from The Powerpuff Girls.
- Ed, Edd (Double D), and Eddy - Three boys who try to make money by scamming their neighbors at their suburban cul-de-sac. Originally from Ed, Edd n Eddy.
- Plank - Jonny 2x4's imaginary friend who is a 2x4 wooden board. Originally from Ed, Edd n Eddy.
- Courage - A pink-furred dog who is afraid of everything and tries to keep his owners, Eustace Bagge and Muriel out of danger. Originally from Courage the Cowardly Dog.
- Muriel - Eustace Bagge's kind-hearted Scottish wife and Courage's other owner. Originally from Courage the Cowardly Dog.
- Buck Tuddrussel - One of the members of Time Squad. Originally from Time Squad.
- Larry 3000 - One of the members of Time Squad. Originally from Time Squad.
- Samurai Jack (voiced by Phil LaMarr) - A samurai sent back in time by Aku. Originally from the series of the same name.
- The Grim Reaper (voiced by Greg Eagles) - A friendly Jamaican-accented Grim Reaper who is enslaved in an unwanted permanent friendship with Billy and Mandy after the latter cheated at a limbo match against him. Originally from Grim & Evil and The Grim Adventures of Billy & Mandy. Eagles was confirmed to reprise his role as Grim from the Grim & Evil franchise in "Crisis on Infinite Mirths".
- Billy (voiced by Richard Steven Horvitz) - A stupid, happy-go-lucky boy who is Mandy's best friend aside from Grim. Originally from Grim & Evil and The Grim Adventures of Billy & Mandy.
- Mandy (voiced by Grey DeLisle) - A cynical, cold-hearted girl who is Billy's best friend alongside Grim. Originally from Grim & Evil and The Grim Adventures of Billy & Mandy.
- Harold (voiced by Richard Steven Horvitz) - Billy's father who has an alter ego by the name of "Mogar." Originally from Grim & Evil and The Grim Adventures of Billy & Mandy.
- Hoss Delgado - A known spectral exterminator with a metallic hand and an eyepatch. Originally from Grim & Evil and The Grim Adventures of Billy & Mandy.
- Fred Fredburger (voiced by C.H. Greenblatt) - A dimwitted, pale green, bipedal furry otherworldly creature resembling an elephant. Originally from The Grim Adventures of Billy & Mandy.
- Hector Con Carne (voiced by Phil LaMarr) - A brain who was originally a "jillionaire" Mexican playboy who wanted to dominate the world. Originally from Grim & Evil and Evil Con Carne.
- Boskov - A Russian circus bear who was picked by Major Doctor Ghastly to carry both Hector Con Carne's brain and stomach. Originally from Grim & Evil and Evil Con Carne.
- Robot Jones (voiced by Jim Conroy) - A robot who not only interacts with three other friends respectively named Socks, Cubey, and Mitch, but also has a crush on Shannon. Originally from Whatever Happened to... Robot Jones? He was originally voiced by a text-to-speech voice and later Bobby Block in the original series.
- Sector V - A group of five 10-year-old children who are part of The Kids Next Door (KND for short), a worldwide espionage-style organization. All originally from Codename: Kids Next Door.
  - Numbuh 1 (Nigel Uno) - A level-headed, no-nonsense bald British-American boy who is the leader of the Kids Next Door.
  - Numbuh 2 (Hoagie Gilligan Jr.) - An overweight, nerdy Jewish-American boy.
  - Numbuh 3 (Kuki Sanban) - A friendly and happy-go-lucky Japanese-American girl.
  - Numbuh 4 (Wallabee Beetles) - A short-tempered and hot-headed Australian-American boy.
  - Numbuh 5 (Abigail Lincoln) - A quiet, laid-back, black French-American girl.
- Bloo - Mac's blue imaginary friend. Originally from Foster's Home for Imaginary Friends.
- Wilt - A red, one-armed, one-eyed imaginary friend who loves basketball, and is the former imaginary friend of Jordan Michaels. Originally from Foster's Home for Imaginary Friends.
- Eduardo (voiced by Tom Kenny) - A purple minotaur-like imaginary friend who is cowardly, but ferocious. Originally from Foster's Home for Imaginary Friends.
- Cheese (voiced by Candi Milo) - A yellow stupid imaginary friend who was thought to be an imaginary friend accidentally created by Mac, but was actually created by Mac's neighbor, Louise. Originally from Foster's Home for Imaginary Friends.
- Frankie Foster (voiced by Grey Griffin) - The granddaughter of Madame Foster and the caretaker of a home for imaginary friends. Originally from Foster's Home for Imaginary Friends.
- Lazlo - An eccentric, optimistic spider monkey who is one of Jelly Bean scouts, alongside his fellow Bean Scouts, Raj, an Indian elephant, and Clam, a rhinoceros. Originally from Camp Lazlo.
- Jake Spidermonkey - An anthropomorphic monkey who attends Charles Darwin Middle School alongside his human best friend, Adam Lyon. Originally from My Gym Partner's a Monkey.
- Ben Tennyson - A boy with the power to shapeshift into different aliens using the Omnitrix. Originally from Ben 10.
  - Stinkfly - One of Ben Tennyson's alien transformations.
- Rodney J. Squirrel (voiced by Richard Steven Horvitz) - A squirrel who is full of crazy ideas and get-rich-quick schemes, and his best friend and owner, a young boy named Andy Johnson. Originally from Squirrel Boy. Rodney was an unexpected Cartoon Network character to appear in "Crisis on Infinite Mirths".
- Flapjack - A cheerful yet gullible orphan who was raised by a female whale named Bubbie and often goes on misadventures with Captain K'nuckles, helping him on his quest for Candied Island and dreams of the coveted title of "Adventurer" K'nuckles purports himself to uphold. Originally from The Marvelous Misadventures of Flapjack.
- Captain K'nuckles - An old Irish sea captain who spent much of his life searching for Candied Island, an island made entirely of candy (as its name suggests), and also goes on misadventures alongside Flapjack. Originally from The Marvelous Misadventures of Flapjack.
- Finn the Human - The last human in the Land of Ooo and Jake's best friend. Originally from Adventure Time.
- Jake the Dog - A 24-year old dog with magical powers and Finn's best friend. Originally from Adventure Time.
- The Ice King - The ruler of the Ice Kingdom who is actually a human named Simon Petrikov. Originally from Adventure Time.
- Princess Bubblegum - The ruler of the Candy Kingdom and the love interest of Finn the Human. Originally from Adventure Time.
- Mordecai and Rigby - A blue jay and a raccoon who not only are best friends, but also try to avoid their job at a park as groundskeepers to entertain themselves by any means. Originally from Regular Show.
