= The Secret (1992 film) =

1992 American television film

- Genre: Drama
- Written by: Cynthia A. Cherbak
- Directed by: Karen Arthur
- Starring: Kirk Douglas; Bruce Boxleitner; Jesse R. Tendler; Brock Peters; Laura Harrington
- Music by: Fred Karlin
- Country of origin: United States
- Original language: English

Production
- Executive producer: Robert Halmi Sr.
- Producers: Craig Anderson; Gerrit van der Meer
- Production locations: Boston; Nova Scotia
- Cinematography: Tom Neuwirth
- Editor: Kathleen Korth
- Running time: 120 minutes
- Production company: RHI Entertainment

Original release
- Network: CBS
- Release: April 19, 1992

The Secret is 1992 American made-for-television drama film starring Kirk Douglas and Jesse R. Tendler about a grandfather and his grandson who both struggle with dyslexia. The film originally aired on CBS on April 19, 1992.

== Plot ==
Filmed in Nova Scotia, the film stars Kirk Douglas as the owner of a store who has difficulty with reading and writing, a fact which he hides from everyone. This changes when he realizes his grandson, Danny (Jesse R. Tendler) has the same difficulties.

== Awards ==
- Nominated: Young Artist Award: Best Young Actor in a film made for television

== See also ==
- List of artistic depictions of dyslexia
