= The Final Frontiersman =

- First edition cover
- Author: James Campbell
- Language: English
- Subject: Biography of Heimo Korth
- Genre: Non-fiction
- Set in: Alaska
- Publisher: ATRIA BOOKS
- Publication date: May 25, 2004
- Publication place: United States
- Media type: Print
- Pages: 320 pp.
- ISBN: 0-7434-5313-1
- Followed by: The Ghost Mountain Boys
- Website: jamesmcampbell.net
- First Book for this Author

The Final Frontiersman is a book by James Campbell that is set in Alaska, following the life of Heimo Korth in the Arctic National Wildlife Refuge. The book chronicles Korth learning how to trap and hunt with the Eskimos of St Lawrence Island, which is where he met and married his wife Edna. Together they moved to ANWR as homesteaders. Campbell recreates some trips that Heimo took to the Alaskan Interior so that he could list the day-to-day activities. Azita Osanloo says that it is not till the end of the book that the author really gets inside the head of his subject. At that time he recounts the tragedy of Edna's and Heimo's first daughter, Coleen, who died during a canoeing accident.

Jim Campbell was originally told that his older cousin Korth was not interested in doing the book. Five years later, Korth’s sister convinced Heimo to give Campbell a chance. At the time Heimo Korth was not interested in sharing his life with the world.

== Reviews ==
"The historical segments of the story provide depth and relevance to the Korth’s life" according to Jennifer Bogart of Blog Critics.

Azita Osanloo of Boise Weekly says that the most interesting parts come at the end of the book and may be too late for readers.

Tyler D. Johnson, writing for the New York Times, says "Campbell's narrative are sometimes abrupt, but he has an acute eye for the details of the Korths' lives"

== See also ==
- Coming into the Country – 1976
