= The Adventures of Gulliver =

- Title card
- Genre: Adventure; Action
- Based on: Gulliver's Travels by Jonathan Swift
- Directed by: Joseph Barbera; William Hanna
- Voices of: Jerry Dexter; John Stephenson; Herb Vigran; Don Messick; Ginny Tyler; Allan Melvin
- Country of origin: United States
- Original language: English
- No. of episodes: 17

Production
- Producers: Joseph Barbera; William Hanna
- Running time: 21–22 minutes
- Production company: Hanna-Barbera Productions

Original release
- Network: ABC
- Release: September 14, 1968 – January 4, 1969

Related
- The Banana Splits and Friends Show

The Adventures of Gulliver is an American animated television series produced by Hanna-Barbera. The show is loosely based on the 1726 satirical novel Gulliver's Travels by Jonathan Swift. The show aired Saturday mornings on ABC-TV and lasted for one season in its original broadcast. The series originally aired between September 14, 1968, and January 4, 1969, for 17 episodes.

== Plot ==
While on a treasure hunting voyage with his father, Gary Gulliver and his dog Tagg end up shipwrecked on an island. On this island is the kingdom of Lilliput, where the inhabitants are only a few inches tall. Gary and Tagg are caught by the Lilliputians while they are recovering from the shipwreck, but afterwards they become great friends. With the help of the Lilliputians, Gary continues searching for his missing father. (A subplot in the series involves a map that Gary's father left to him after secretly putting it inside Tagg's collar before the shipwreck). The villain of the series is the evil Captain Leech who, in the adventures, is always attempting to steal the map from Gary.

== Broadcast history ==
Seventeen episodes were produced and were originally broadcast on ABC in the fall and winter of 1968-69. The episodes were rerun through the summer of 1970. In 1971, the show became part of The Banana Splits and Friends Show, the syndicated version of The Banana Splits Adventure Hour. Toys were produced in Germany by Heimo.

== Voice cast ==
- Jerry Dexter – Gary Gulliver
- John Stephenson – Captain John Leech, Thomas Gulliver (Gary's father), and King Pomp (monarch of Lilliput)
- Ginny Tyler – Flirtacia (King Pomp's daughter and princess of Lilliput)
- Allan Melvin – Bunko (a Lilliputian)
- Don Messick – Eager (a Lilliputian) and Tagg (Gary's dog)
- Herb Vigran – Glum (a Lilliputian)

== List of episodes ==
| No. | Title | Original release date | Prod. code |
|---|---|---|---|
| AG–1 | "Dangerous Journey" | September 14, 1968 | 36-1 |
The pilot episode. During an ocean voyage to find a legendary treasure on an unknown island, Thomas Gulliver and his son Gary are attacked by Leech, the captain of the schooner they're travelling on, for the map pointing the way. When the ship runs aground, Thomas hides the map in Tagg's collar and orders Gary and Tagg out the porthole, just before everyone is swept into the sea. Gary and Tagg drift to an island, where the Lilliputians capture them, but after some initial misunderstandings they become friends. When King Pomp is carried off by a hawk, Gary rescues him, and he and Tagg are allowed to stay. Eager reveals that he has found Thomas Gulliver's watch, leading Gary to believe his dad is still alive.
| AG–2 | "The Valley Of Time" | September 21, 1968 | 36-3 |
While searching the island for his father, Gary, Tagg and their Lilliputian friends (Princess Flirtacia, Bunko, Eager, and Glum) are forced to take shelter in a cave from a storm, unaware that Leech has made it to the island as well. Leech blocks the entrance with a boulder to blackmail Gary into surrendering the map. Forced to find another way out, the friends explore the cave system their shelter opens to, emerging into an isolated valley populated by dinosaurs and cavemen. After Gary rescues a little boy from plunging over a waterfall, he and his friends are captured by a cavemen tribe. Using Gary's wits and with the caveboy's help, they escape the valley and the still-waiting Leech.
| AG–3 | "The Capture" | September 28, 1968 | 36-2 |
On the beach of Lilliput, Gary and company run into Leech and a crew of cutthroat pirates under Captain Cutler, who recruit the two by force. Leech attempts to make a deal with Cutler for the treasure Thomas Gulliver tried to find; but the Lilliputians, who went unnoticed by the pirates, launch a rescue mission. They effect an escape, and when the pirates pursue, they trick them into fleeing off the island. However, Leech has stayed behind and is eager for revenge.
| AG–4 | "The Tiny Vikings" | October 5, 1968 | 36-8 |
The capitol of Lilliput comes under attack by a band of Lilliputian-sized Vikings. When the Lilliputians bungle their defensive response, Gary intervenes and drives the invaders away. The Vikings are then met by Leech, who proposes an alliance: If they can get him the map, he will get rid of Gary for them. As the Vikings try to steal the map while Gary sleeps, Flirtacia comes upon them and is kidnapped, and as he tries to rescue her, Gary is captured as well. Bunko, Glum and Eager set out to rescue their friends, but in a subsequent struggle Leech finds the map in Tagg's collar. When the Vikings attempt another assault on Lilliput, Gary coordinates the defenses, which ends with the capture of the Vikings. After being forced to help in repairing the damage they caused, the Vikings depart, never to return.
| AG–5 | "The Forbidden Pool" | October 12, 1968 | 36-4 |
After managing to escape from Captain Leech once again, Gary and Tagg drink water from a forbidden pool, which rises only once every eight years, and shrink down to the Lilliputians' size. Now it is a race against time as they, along with Flirtacia, Bunko, Eager, Glum, must get to a similar spring on the other side of the island which is bound to disappear at the next sunrise. On this trip, they must both contend with Leech, who steals the map from Gary, and the island's natural dangers using cooperation and their wits. Leech is imprisoned by Brunek, a shipwrecked hostile hermit, compelling Gary and his friends to free him in exchange for the map. Afterwards, they arrive at the spring just in time to restore Gary and Tagg to their original sizes.
| AG–6 | "The Perils Of The Lilliputs" | October 19, 1968 | 36-5 |
A sailing ship chartered by circus owner B. G. Bannings lands at Lilliput Island, and two of its crew come ashore to find fresh water. The Lilliputians inform Gulliver, who goes to meet the sailors, hoping that one of them might be his father. Curious about his presence, the sailors follow Gary and thus discover the Lilliputians' existence. Bannings decides to add the Lilliputians to his menagerie and kidnaps Bunko, Eager and Glum. Leech offers Cutlass, the ship's captain and an old acquaintance, a partnership for recovering the island's buried treasure. When Gulliver boards the ship to recover his friends, he is captured by the two captains and the map is stolen from him, but he succeeds in freeing himself and his friends, and releases the captured animals from their cages to cover their escape. Cutlass double-crosses Leech, and in their subsequent quarrel they end up losing the map to Gary.
| AG–7 | "Exit Leech" | October 26, 1968 | 36-7 |
After Leech captures Gary and Eager, he surprises them by announcing that he has grown tired of chasing after the treasure and he is leaving the island. After seeing him off, Gary and the Lilliputians celebrate, but Gary falls unconscious after drinking from a cask of sleep berry juice. This is all part of Leech's plan, who returns disguised as a witch doctor to trick the Lilliputians into surrendering the treasure map to him. Tagg, however, identifies Leech and snatches one half of the map from him. Leech then ends up in hot water with the natives he stole the witch doctor's clothes from; Gary rescues him and recovers the map's other half before they go their separate ways again - for the moment.
| AG–8 | "Hurricane Island" | November 2, 1968 | 36-6 |
Intending to do his friends a favor and look for his father at the same time, Gary sets out for the opposite end of the island to find an ostrich egg needed for a Lilliputian festival. Believing he's after the hidden treasure, Leech begins trailing Gary and ends up saving him from danger several times. When a hurricane strikes that part of the island, Flirtacia and the others set out to bring Gary back. After meeting up with his little friends, Gary brings the egg back to the Lilliputian capitol, while Leech is left raging over his futile exercise.
| AG–9 | "Mysterious Forest" | November 9, 1968 | 36-9 |
Gary and his Lilliputian friends are spending a night with the tribe of native Chief Mondo. When Leech tries to steal the map, they encounter a quartet of ghosts who demand treasure from them. When Leech points out the map in Gary's possession, the ghosts drag Gary off into the Mysterious Forest, a supposedly haunted region greatly feared by the natives. The Lilliputians and Tagg set out to rescue Gary, and discover that the "ghosts" are really a band of gypsies looking for riches. The Lilliputians and Gary flee the camp with the gypsies in hot pursuit. Returning to the natives' village, they prepare a trap and expose the true nature of the "forest ghosts", sending the band running. As a token of friendship, Chief Mondo gives Gary a ring which he recognizes as his father's, proving that he is still alive.
| AG–10 | "Little Man Of The Year" | November 16, 1968 | 36-10 |
The Lilliputians' Man Of The Year festival is upcoming. Eager's fear that Gary has much better chances than him for claiming that title prompts Gary to leave and explore the Zimgaggi territory on the island's other side for the duration of the contest. An out-of-control firework rocket made by Eager accidentally triggers a rockslide, blocking off Lilliput's river and threatening to cause a disastrous flood. To make up for his blunder, Eager breaks out of prison and seeks out Gary, and after evading the hostile Zimgaggis, they return in the nick of time to save the city. For his vital assistance and with Gary's endorsement, Eager becomes Lilliput's Man Of The Year.
| AG–11 | "The Rescue" | November 23, 1968 | 36-11 |
Leech manages to capture Tagg and Gary's Lilliputian friends while they are collecting berries for Flirtacia's pies. Leech releases the Lilliputians to inform Gary that he will exchange Tagg for the map; but in a case of bad timing, Gary has left to explore a clue about his father's whereabouts. Left on their own, the Lilliputians track Leech to his hideout, an abandoned pueblo town inhabited by monkeys. After the Lilliputians befriend the monkeys, they liberate Tagg and escape while the monkeys run interference on Leech, and return to town just in time to finish a special pie for Gary's return.
| AG–12 | "The Dark Sleep" | November 30, 1968 | 36-12 |
Leech seeks out the witch Malagar, who brews him a sleeping potion for Gary so Leech can steal the map from him. Using two corrupt Lilliputian rogues as his stooges, Leech slips the potion to Gary, but after discovering the scheme, Flirtacia accidentally falls victim to the potion while saving Gary. Gary and his friends set out to procure the antidote to the potion from Malagar's castle. After a furious run-and-snatch chase against Malagar and Leech, they manage to get their hands on it and wake Flirtacia from the Dark Sleep.
| AG–13 | "The Runaway" | December 7, 1968 | 36-13 |
While supervising the preparation of a birthday cake for Gary, Flirtacia's father King Pomp discovers a picture featuring an attractive woman and a dedication to Gary. When Flirtacia, who has a crush on Gary, sees the picture (unaware that it features Gary's younger sister), she leaves Lilliput in a jealous huff by crossing the perilous Swamp Lands. When Glum comes upon Flirtacia's farewell message, he races to retrieve her, with both ending up on a stone sinking into the mire. Gary, Tagg, Bunko and Eager arrive just in time to save them, and after the misunderstanding is cleared, Gary and the Lilliputians enjoy a happy birthday party together.
| AG–14 | "The Masquerade" | December 14, 1968 | 36-14 |
While embarking on a picnic trip, Flirtacia and her friends come upon Leech joining forces with the Lilliputian outlaw Gruff Gang and planning to replace King Pomp with a doppelgänger to gain the map. Owing to Bunko's bumbling, the friends accidentally alert the bandits to their presence and are captured. When Gary goes looking for his overdue friends, Leech and Gruff set their plan in motion and replace Pomp. After freeing themselves and meeting with Gary, the friends race back to Lilliput but are too late to stop the scheme; Gary falls off a cliff after a fight with Leech and is declared an outlaw. Bunko and the others break out of prison, free Pomp and rejoin Gary. While Gary distracts Leech, his Lilliputian friends infiltrate a masquerade ball at the royal castle, swap the impostor for the real king, and succeed in capturing the entire bandit gang. And with Pomp back in charge, Leech is chased off by the Lilliputian army.
| AG–15 | "The Missing Crown" | December 21, 1968 | 36-15 |
One night, just before the 100th anniversary celebration of Lilliput's founding, King Pomp's crown is stolen by an unknown thief, followed by a succession of peculiar thefts of worthless everyday items. Bunko and Eager immediately engage in amateur sleuth work, only to be baffled when some of the stolen items are just as mysteriously returned, along with clues which pit Gary's friends against each other. Taking charge of the investigation, Gary discovers that the culprit is a pack rat living in an isolated part of the island and recovers the stolen goods, reconciling his friends and allowing the festival to proceed.
| AG–16 | "Gulliver's Challenge" | December 28, 1968 | 36-16 |
While accompanying Gary, Flirtacia, Bunko, Eager, and Glum are captured by the Black Knight, who forces them to entertain him in his castle. Gary follows their trail and confronts the Black Knight, who challenges him to a joust. The night before the duel, the Lilliputians secretly sabotage the Knight's weapons, giving Gary a chance to win. After incapacitating the Knight's final weapon — his horse — the Knight is forced to admit defeat and made to swear never to bother the Lilliputians again.
| AG–17 | "The Hero" | January 4, 1969 | 36-17 |
While Gary, Tagg and their Lilliputian friends embark on another search for Gary's still-missing father, Flirtacia and Eager are accidentally placed in mortal peril, from which Gary saves them. As Gary leaves to investigate a possible clue, the Lilliputians reminisce about his past heroics, leaving Eager dejected and thinking of himself as a failure. Separating from his friends to sulk, Eager ends up eating a fruit which gives him hallucinations about becoming a superhero. Right after his friends wake him up, Leech kidnaps Flirtacia and flees into an abandoned mine. When Gary and the Lilliputians confront him, Flirtacia ends up falling from a great height, but Eager manages to catch her, making him the princess' hero of the day.

== Additional series credits ==
- Associate Producer: Lew Marshall
- Story Direction: Howard Swift
- Story by: Ken Spears, Joe Ruby
- Animation Director: Charles A. Nichols
- Production Design: Iwao Takamoto
- Production Coordinator: Victor O. Schipek
- Layouts: John Ahern, Pete Alvarado, Dick Bickenbach, Brad Case, Walt Clinton, Richard Gonzalez, Gary Hoffman, Jack Huber, Tom Knowles, Lance Nolley, Joel Seibel, Don Sheppard
- Animation: Ray Abrams, Carlos Alfonso, Bob Bemiller, Ron Campbell, Shannon Lee Dyer, Hugh Fraser, George Goepper, Fernando Gonzales, Sam Jaimes, Volus Jones, Dick Lundy, Ed Parks, Don Patterson, Ray Patterson, Irv Spence, Bob Taylor, Lloyd Vaughan, Allen Wilzbach
- Backgrounds: Walt Peregoy, Janet Brown, Sheila Brown, Albert Gmuer, Fernando Montealegre, Gary Niblett, Eric Semones, Peter Van Elk
- Titles: Robert Schaefer
- Music Director: Ted Nichols
- Technical Supervisor: Frank Paiker
- Ink and Paint Supervisor: Roberta Greutert
- Xerography: Robert "Tiger" West
- Sound Direction: Richard Olson
- Film Editing: Geoffrey Griffin, James Yaras
- Camera: George Epperson, Charles Flekal, Bill Kotler, Ralph Migliori, Cliff Shirpser, Roy Wade

A Hanna-Barbera Production. Hanna-Barbera Productions, Inc. ©MCMLXVIII-MCMLXXI All rights reserved.

== Home Video ==
The 1st episode "Dangerous Journey" was released on the DVDs Saturday Morning Cartoons Vol. 2 & Saturday Morning Cartoons: 1960s-1980s Collection.

== Other Media ==
From 1972-1982, a small boat ride themed around the series called Gulliver’s Rub-a-Dub operated at Kings Island in Cincinnati, Ohio in the Happy Land of Hanna-Barbera section of the park. Characters from the series were also featured in The Enchanted Voyage ride at the park which operated from 1972-1983.

Flirtacia appeared in the third season of Jellystone!.

== See also ==
- List of works produced by Hanna-Barbera Productions
- List of Hanna-Barbera characters
