= Heimo (company) =

German toy and accessory company

- Company type: Private company
- Industry: Toys, Figurines
- Founded: c. 1950s
- Defunct: c. 1980s
- Headquarters: Mölln, Germany
- Area served: Worldwide
- Products: Animals, knights, pirates, soldiers, Disney characters, toons

Heimo was a German producer of hand painted toy figurines and accessories. The company was headquartered in Germany and manufactured hand-painted play and collection figures from about 1950 to 1980. The traditional market for Heimo products had been Mainland Europe, with half their sales in Austria followed by Germany, Italy and Spain.

== History ==
The toy manufacturer was established in the 1950s in Germany. Since the end of the 1950s, it produced collectable figurines and toys in Hamburg in cooperation with the US company Marx. One focus was on motifs based around Walt Disney characters. It also manufactured popular figures in hard PVC and later hard rubber that included Vikings, Romans, Pirates, Knights, Indians and Cowboys as well as US soldiers. From the 1960s, some figures were distributed under the name Heimo but some produced exclusively for the new company in Mölln founded by Marx's CEO Heitmann.

The design of products and the creation of tooling had been done in-house. This success story was copied very soon by the toy manufacturer Schleich, who then took over the market leadership from the 1990s onwards.

Although Heimo products had been sold in many European countries, detailed information is rarely known to many collectors. This is explained by the fact that only the few figurines were labeled with a company name (Sometimes the licensor is called Zuiyo instead) - there are no dated figurines. The company logo was a circle with a cross.
