= Kathleen Korth =

American film editor (born 1952)

- Born: 2 December 1952 (age 73); San Francisco, California
- Occupation: Editor
- Years active: 1976–1999

Kathleen Korth (born 2 December 1952) is an American film editor. As first assistant editor she has worked on E.T.: The Extra-Terrestrial. As a re-snyc editor she worked on Terminator 2: Judgment Day. She has worked on feature films as well as films that were made for television.

== Career ==
In the mid 1970s she worked on the Anthony Howarth directed documentary People of the Wind, which was about a tribe of nomads in west Iran. It also featured singer Shusha Guppy.

In the late 1990s, she served as the editor for the 1999 Laurel Ladevich-directed documentary Fly Girls, which was about female pilots during the second world war. Both Ladevich and North had previously worked together as editors in Eye on the Sparrow in 1987 and Blue Bayou in 1990.

== Filmography ==
=== Editor ===
Films

- Eye on the Sparrow (1987)
- Blue Bayou (1990)
- Legacy(1990)
- The Secret (1992)
- Witness (1997)

Documentary

- The Wild West (1993)
- Yellowstone (1994)
- Ozarks: Legacy & Legend (1995)
- San Francisco: The Movie (1995)
- Zion Canyon: Treasure of the Gods (1996)
- Africa's Elephant Kingdom (1998)
- American Experience:
  Fly Girls (1999)

=== Sound dept ===
Sound editor

- Wow!

Assistant sound editor

- Ordinary People (1980)
- Indiana Jones and the Temple of Doom (1984)
- Cocoon (1985)
- Soapdish (1991)
- House of Cards (1993)
