= Heimo of Bamberg =

Heimo of Bamberg or Heimo of Michelsberg (c. 1085 – 31 July 1139) was an Augustinian canon, historian and chronologist.

Start of Heimo's only surviving work

== Life ==
Heimo was probably born around 1085. He was a canon in the church of Sankt Jakob just outside Bamberg by 1108. He later studied at the abbey of Michelsberg, where his teachers included Dudo and Frutolf. Ebbo of Michelsberg in his Life of Otto of Bamberg records that a Spaniard named Bernard, who entered Micheslberg in 1122, was the primary influence on Heimo's interest in chronology. Bernard and Heimo engaged in extensive discussions of the date of Creation, the date of the birth of Jesus and the date of his Passion.

Heimo died on 31 July 1139, as recorded in the necrology of Michelsberg. He may have suffered from a chronic illness, for he refers in De decursu temporum to "my infirmity".

== Works ==
According to Ebbo, Heimo wrote many books, but only one has survived. This is a universal chronicle in Latin, entitled Consideratio annorum seculi et Christi Iesu, but better known as De decursu temporum. He completed it in 1135 and dedicated it to the priest Burchard, one of his teachers at Michelsberg.

There are two versions of the Consideratio, both by the author and both completed in 1135. The editio prior (earlier edition) is found in one manuscript copy from 1135 (Munich, Bayerische Staatsbibliothek, Clm. 2), while the editio posterior (later edition) is found in a later 12th-century manuscript (Munich, Bayerische Staatsbibliothek, Clm. 18769). Another manuscript of the posterior version (Strasbourg, Bibliothèque nationale et universitaire, MS E.11) was lost to fire during the siege of Strasbourg in 1870. A partial edition first appeared in 1869, but the first complete edition was not published until 2004.

The editio prior consists of a prologue and twenty-six chapters. The editio posterior is slightly longer, contains a new prologue and is divided into seven books. The second edition was made in response to critiques Heimo had requested from Burchard and Dudo. The prologue to the second edition refers to an unauthorized copy of the first edition, which is probably the surviving copy, which was moved to Augsburg by 1137. The gospels had to be reinterpreted in light of the Jewish calendar.

Heimo's major chronological innovation is to redate the crucifixion to 25 March in year 1 of the Anno Domini era, thus moving Jesus' birth back to 33 BC. This was based on his belief that the sequence of full and hollow months in use among Jews in the 1st century was out of step with that used by Christians subsequently, so that the age of the moon in a given month was typically one day off.

Heimo refers to one of his earlier works, a computus that is now lost.

== Sources ==
- Kishpaugh, M. J. (2003). "Heimo of Michelsberg". New Catholic Encyclopedia. Vol. 6 (2nd ed.). Gale. p. 718.
- Nothaft, C. Philipp E. (2011). Dating the Passion: The Life of Jesus and the Emergence of Scientific Chronology (200–1600). Brill.
- Verbist, Peter (2010). Duelling with the Past: Medieval Authors and the Problem of the Christian Era, c. 990–1135. Brepols.
- Verbist, Peter (2016). "Heimo von Bamberg". In Graeme Dunphy (ed.). Encyclopedia of the Medieval Chronicle Online. Brill.
- Weikmann, Hans Martin, ed. (2004). Heimo von Bamberg: De decursu temporum. Hahnsche Buchhandlung.
