= Fajer Al-Kaisi =

Iraqi-Canadian actor (born 1979)

- فجر القيسي
- Born: Iraq
- Occupation: Actor
- Years active: 2005–present

Fajer Al-Kaisi (Arabic: فجر القيسي) is an Iraqi-Canadian actor, best known for his recurring role as Osama bin Laden / OBL in the third season of Future Man, an atheist version of the real-life terrorist from an alternate reality where he was prevented from becoming one.

== Early life ==
Born in Iraq, Al-Kaisi spent much of his childhood in Kuwait and later settled in Montreal, Quebec, Canada. He soon moved to the United States where he completed his master's in acting at the University of Texas at Austin.

== Filmography ==
Year	Movie	Role	Notes and Awards
2005	Last Best Chance	Deputy	DVD video
2006	Time Bomb	Ahmed Al-Fatwa	Television film
2006	Guide de la petite vengeance	Vendeur 8	
2008	I'll Come Running	Karim	
2008	The Telephone Eulogies	Arabic speaker	Short film
2008	The Whistler	The Janiterrorist	Short film
2016	Billy Lynn's Long Halftime Walk	Interpreter	
2019	The Report	Ali Soufan	

Year	Television appearance	Role	Other notes
2007	30 Rock	Hot Dog Vendor	Episode: "Jack Gets in the Game"
2009	Nurse Jackie	Social Worker	Episode: "Nose Bleed"
2018	Daredevil	Nihar Nadeem	Episode: "Resurrection"
2020	Future Man	Osama bin Laden / OBL	Season 3; recurring role
2021–25	Jellystone!	Hadji, Shazzan, Quack-Up, Klunk, Inch High	Voice only; main role
2025	Mobile Suit Gundam GQuuuuuuX	Challia Bull	Voice only; English dub

== Personal life ==
Al-Kaisi is fluent in English, French, and Arabic and speaks conversational Spanish and Italian.

He currently resides in New York City.
