= Heimo Korth =

American outdoorsman

Heimo Korth is an American outdoorsman. He and his wife Edna are among the few permanent residents of the Arctic National Wildlife Refuge. They live along the Coleen River, just south of the Brooks Range, and move between cabins seasonally. Striving to be self-reliant, they hunt and fish for their own food.

The Korths' lifestyle came to public attention with James Campbell's 2004 book The Final Frontiersman: Heimo Korth and His Family, Alone in Alaska's Arctic Wilderness. In 2009, VBS.tv produced Surviving Alone in Alaska, a documentary film showing Korth's lifestyle. He was also featured among others on PBS's "Braving Alaska" in 1992.

Reliant on bush pilots to transport him in and out of his home in the bush, he was incidentally featured in Flying Wild Alaska 2011 - 2012, as Korth had hired the series' protagonist Jim Tweto to fly him out of Fairbanks.

Heimo, Edna and their family, alongside 4 other families, make up the Discovery series The Last Alaskans which premiered in 2015.

Heimo and his wife are briefly discussed in the book, "Warriors Creed," when two Pararescue Jumpers drop in during a snow storm to provide medical assistance to Edna, and transport them both to a medical facility.

Heimo's first name is of Finnish origin and means "tribe" in English.
