= List of Jellystone! episodes =

Jellystone! is an American animated comedy television series developed by C. H. Greenblatt for the streaming service HBO Max. The series is produced by Warner Bros. Animation and features reimagined versions of various characters by Hanna-Barbera. It premiered on July 29, 2021.

During the course of the series, 77 episodes of Jellystone! were released over three seasons, between July 29, 2021, and March 6, 2025.

== Series overview ==
Season	Episodes	Originally released		
Season	Episodes	First released	Last released	Network
1	21	July 29, 2021	October 21, 2021	HBO Max
2	19	March 17, 2022		HBO Max
3	37	February 22, 2024	March 6, 2025	Max

== Episodes ==
=== Season 1 (2021) ===
No. overall	No. in season	Title	Directed by	Story by	Storyboarded by	Original release date	Cartoon Network air date	Prod. code	U.S. linear viewers (millions)
1	1	"Yogi's Tummy Trouble"	C. H. Greenblatt	C. H. Greenblatt	C. H. Greenblatt	July 29, 2021	September 4, 2021	101A	0.35
Cindy accidentally turns Yogi into an unstoppable eating machine after installing a nuclear stomach into him so he wouldn't have to keep being indecisive on what he gets in the hospital's cafeteria. When each of the citizens get eaten, Cindy must lead the remaining ones into disabling the nuclear stomach through whatever way possible.
2	2	"Gorilla in Our Midst"	Careen Ingle	Ian Wasseluk	Yotam Perel	July 29, 2021	September 4, 2021	101B	0.26
When Grape Ape falls asleep in the middle of town square following Mayor Huckleberry's award to police chief Touché Turtle and Cindy diagnoses this as a food coma, it is up to Yogi, Boo Boo, Cindy, and the citizens of Jellystone to move this mountain and cure Grape Ape of his food coma. Meanwhile, Doggie Daddy gets stuck to Grape Ape's fur when trying to get to Augie.
3	3	"Boo Boots"	Aaron Austin	Ian Mutchler	Ian Mutchler	July 29, 2021	September 11, 2021	102A	0.21
Feeling unappreciated and considering himself invisible to the citizens of Jellystone, Boo Boo gets a boost from a new pair of boots as they start to interact with him. Yogi grows jealous of Boo Boo's newfound popularity and soon ends up in a tall boot war with him as they go through tall boots after tall boots to try to outdo each other.
4	4	"My Doggie Dave"	Aaron Austin	C. H. Greenblatt	Melody Iza	July 29, 2021	September 11, 2021	102B	0.21
When Doggie Daddy brings a disguised Augie to his friends' night with Yogi as he didn't want to leave Augie with a babysitter, Boo Boo, Captain Caveman, and Bobbie Louie, she becomes the most popular member of the group. This causes Augie to continue acting like Dave which starts to annoy Doggie Daddy enough to challenge Dave to an advanced bowling competition.
5	5	"A Coconut to Remember"	Hannah Ayoubi	Hannah Ayoubi	Kaitlyn Graziano	July 29, 2021	September 18, 2021	103A	0.13
When Magilla gets amnesia after being hit by a falling coconut as part of a Hawaiian background, Jabberjaw exploits him to score her dream job as assistant manager of the store which Magilla couldn't do as it wouldn't be fair to Loopy. When the coconut bonking goes too far, Jabberjaw enlists Yogi and Cindy in order to get to his core memory before his entire memories are gone forever.
6	6	"Grocery Store"	Careen Ingle	Careen Ingle	Meghan Lands	July 29, 2021	September 18, 2021	103B	0.13
After Augie and Doggie Daddy forget a crucial ingredient for their fruit salad while shopping at the grocery store Barberas, Augie persuades Doggie Daddy to hold their place in line and embarks on a journey to retrieve those bananas. After trying cheese from Shazzan, Augie enjoys the delights of Barberas while Doggie Daddy keeps his spot in line defended much to the annoyance of Mr. Jinx, Peter Potamus, Bobbie Louie, and Winsome Witch.
7	7	"Must Be Jelly"	Hannah Ayoubi	Kaitlyn Graziano	Kaitlyn Graziano	July 29, 2021	September 25, 2021	104A	0.18
Cindy has a busy schedule where she does some things for Boo Boo, Yogi, and the hospital president Ranger Smith and deals with a book club gathering with Jabberjaw, Mr. Jinx, and Winsome Witch. Not wanting to be shunned from the book club, Cindy creates a laser that puts everyone in a gelatin stasis in order to finish her book club reading.
8	8	"Cats Do Dance"	Careen Ingle	Careen Ingle	Aaron Chen	July 29, 2021	September 25, 2021	104B	0.15
After losing their alley in a dance battle against King's group because they can't dance and having to bunk with Peter Potamus, Top Cat and the gang might actually have to do some hard work to get it back like spreading banana peels near them, doing a bad parade, and licking everything. When all of them fail, Top Cat and his gang decide to do a dance battle against King's group.
9	9	"VIP Baby You Know Me"	Aaron Austin	Melody Iza	Aaron Austin, C. H. Greenblatt & Ian Wasseluk	July 29, 2021	October 2, 2021	105A	0.16
Shag wants to live a VIP lifestyle. Unfortunately, he meets the Banana Splits who loan him money to improve the Mud Bug Café and now has to pay them back and their interest. With the Banana Splits planning to give his family's restaurant one-star reviews enough for nobody to ever dine there again, Shag enlists Augie and Yakky Doodle to help him out.
10	10	"El Kabong's Kabong is Gone"	Hannah Ayoubi	Hannah Ayoubi	Meghan Lands	July 29, 2021	October 2, 2021	105B	0.13
El Kabong must find a new "weapon" to replace his beloved guitar Susan after it was destroyed by the Banana Splits wearing special helmets. He tries different instruments when Squiddly Diddly's shop is out of guitars. After each instrument fails to work on the Banana Splits even when they raid Jellystone Elementary School, El Kabong must use the most unlikeliest way of improvising a guitar.
11	11	"Mr. Flabby Dabby Wabby Jabby"	Aaron Austin	Ian Wasseluk	Amy Hudkins	July 29, 2021	October 9, 2021	106A	0.13
When the movie "Super Ultra Death Woman 4: The Deathening" comes out at the Jellystone Theater, Shag, Augie, and Yakky are up to seeing it, they are told by Shazzan that it is for grown-ups only. To see it, Shag, Augie, and Yakky go the Jellystone Theater in the disguise of a lawyer named Mr. Flabby Dabby Wabby Jabby. Things get out of hand when they're mistaken for the real Mr. Flabby Dabby Wabby Jabby by everyone.
12	12	"Ice Ice Daddy"	Aaron Austin	Ian Mutchler	Ian Mutchler	July 29, 2021	October 9, 2021	106B	0.15
After a night out with Yogi, Boo Boo, Jabberjaw, and Loopy, Captain Caveman goes with them to see the Jellystone Ice Caps. He breaks some ice where he thaws out Cavey Jr. who calls him his father. Realizing he's a father after Snagglepuss does a DNA test on his talk show, Cavey dedicates himself to being the best dad to Cavey Jr.
13	13	"DNA, A-OK!"	Careen Ingle	Melody Iza	Charlie Gavin	July 29, 2021	October 16, 2021	107A	0.22
DNA A-OK is a program started by Captain Caveman that takes the sample of saliva to help find their heritage. Yogi is among those that want to find their heritage. After finding out he's 98% cat, Yogi resigns being a doctor and tries to roll with Top Cat and his gang after seeing them scam J. Whimple Dimple out of his money. He has a hard time fitting in by doing scams for them which go comically awry.
14	14	"Face of the Town!"	Aaron Austin	Aaron Austin	Ian Mutchler	July 29, 2021	October 16, 2021	107B	0.21
Mayor Huckleberry throws a town event to celebrate the accomplishments of Hubert Bartholomewbert who founded Jellystone 100 years ago. When Jellystone's oldest citizen Lippy the Lion reveals the truth about Hubert being a liar about his stories which he did for fame and money, Mayor Huckleberry holds a contest to find the new face of Jellystone. This causes everyone to compete in it where Mayor Huckleberry has a hard time picking a winner.
15	15	"Cattanooga Cheese Explosion"	Careen Ingle	Yotam Perel	Yotam Perel	July 29, 2021	October 23, 2021	108A	0.18
After treating Augie, Yogi learns from Doggie Daddy that Augie got full at the premiere pizza restaurant called the Cattanooga Cheese Explosion which is on Avenue Boulevard. When Yogi arrives, he learns from its owner Chopper that it is for happy families only. After failing to pass Boo Boo off as a child, Yogi strikes a deal with Shag so he can enter and eat their food.
16	16	"Squish or Miss"	Hannah Ayoubi	Kaitlyn Graziano	Kaitlyn Graziano	July 29, 2021	October 23, 2021	108B	0.19
Chopper drops off Yakky at the playground who is weary about being squished. Hearing about Yakky's plight, Augie and Shag try to help Yakky be braver which includes getting advice from Doggie Daddy, Jabberjaw, and Peter Potamus. When it comes to Cindy, she plans to extract Yakky's fear juice out with her fear sucker invention.
17	17	"Gotta Kiss Them All"	Hannah Ayoubi	Ben Gruber	Meghan Lands	July 29, 2021	October 30, 2021	109A	0.10
Ruff and Reddy blow themselves up trying to cherish the other causing Doggie Daddy to work on repairing them. When Augie and Yakky discover a fun VR game called "Buddy Blastez" hosted by The Great Gazoo, they wind up blurring the lines between fiction and reality when they unknowingly cause havoc around Jellystone. Now it is up to Doggie Daddy to end the game.
18	18	"Jelly Wrestle Rumble!"	Careen Ingle	Aaron Austin	Yotam Perel	July 29, 2021	October 30, 2021	109B	0.13
Mr. Jinks gives Mayor Huckleberry a gift for his good cholesterol report in the form of his favorite wrestler the Funky Phantom who had lost his final wrestling match against Mightor. After showing off his Funky Phantom collectibles in his personal museum, Mayor Huckleberry hosts a wrestling tournament commentated by Snagglepuss and Mildew Wolf so Funky Phantom can relive his glory days.
19	19	"A Fish Sticky Situation"	Aaron Austin	Ian Mutchler	Ian Mutchler	July 29, 2021	November 6, 2021	110A	0.14
A crate of fish sticks that expired in 2015 falls off a van upon hitting a pothole outside of the alley. Top Cat and his gang are in for a smelly surprise when they try to resell them to the unsuspecting Jellystone residents at $11.00. This causes anyone who consumes them to have their heads turned into fish heads. Now Top Cat and his gang must cure everyone of this condition.
20	20	"A Town Video: Welcome to Jellystone"	Aaron Austin	Ian Wasseluk	Raj Brueggemann	July 29, 2021	November 6, 2021	110B	0.11
Mayor Huckleberry is planning a tourism video of Jellystone and receives negative feedback from Snagglepuss. Mr. Jinks shows Mayor Huckleberry a trending video involving Yogi's surgery bloopers. When Mayor Huckleberry hires Yogi to direct the Jellystone tourism video, things get out of hand when he does action-themed video and blows the town budget. Due to Yogi being into his character, Mayor Huckleberry engages Yogi in battle with an anime filter added to it.
21	21	"Spell Book"	Hannah Ayoubi	Ben Gruber	Meghan Lands	October 21, 2021	N/A	111	N/A
On Halloween, Augie, Shag, and Yakky prepare for their night of trick or treating. After seeing Winsome Witch stressed out and tired of setting up Halloween decorations, Augie, Shag, and Yakky try to help her. After time passes, they use her spellbook to summon little helpers that possess Winsome's decorations so the kids can partake in the Jellystone Candy Gauntlet which goes wrong quickly.

=== Shorts (2021) ===
No.	Title	Original release date
1	"Kid Stylez for Old People!"	September 5, 2021
2	"Kid Stylez for Old People!"	September 7, 2021
The kids give makeovers to the adults.
3	"Welcome to Magilla's"	September 10, 2021
A commercial for Magilla Gorilla's haberdashery "Magilla's".
4	"Cooking with Winsome Witch"	September 12, 2021
Winsome Witch teaches people how to cook.
5	"Kabong It!"	September 14, 2021
A commercial in which El Kabong sells a guitar to deal with life's irritations.
6	"Health & Safety with Doggie Daddy"	September 16, 2021
Doggie Daddy teaches Augie Doggie how to ride a bike.
7	"Wait-Tea"	September 21, 2021
Mayor Huckleberry Hound and Mr. Jinks make a batch of Sun-Tea as various crazy events occur around them.

=== Season 2 (2022) ===
No. overall	No. in season	Title	Directed by	Story by	Storyboarded by	Original release date	Prod. code
22	1	"Lady Danjjer: Is It Wrong to Long for Kabong?"	Ian Wasseluk	Hannah Ayoubi	Hannah Ayoubi	March 17, 2022	201
As Snagglepuss reports on Shazzan's gourmet ice cream that everyone in Jellystone is getting, Yogi, Boo Boo, Mr. Jinks, and Loopy recall their first kisses. Jabberjaw desires her first kiss to be from El Kabong after seeing him stop Klunk who stole Jabberjaw's ice cream. After Jabberjaw's attempts that involve putting herself in different dangerous scenarios fails, Loopy disguises Jabberjaw as a villain called Lady Danjjer to get his attention.
23	2	"Baby Shenanigans"	Hannah Ayoubi	Kaitlyn Graziano	Kaitlyn Graziano	March 17, 2022	202
Yakky, Augie, and Shag are looking forward to doing activities with their respective parents. Wanting other kids to play with and hearing from Snagglepuss that they will not be as youthful when they grow up, Yakky, Augie, and Shag are inspired to turn back time using Jellystone's clock tower where they accidentally turn all the citizens of Jellystone into babies. When it gets out of control, they find themselves having to defend the clock tower from baby Snagglepuss who has allied with a 72-year-old Lippy and Hardy.
24	3	"Bleep"	Careen Ingle	Kaitlyn Graziano	Charlie Gavin	March 17, 2022	203
Cindy gets her first free Saturday. Unfortunately, she can't find anyone to hang out with due to Yogi, Boo Boo, Jabberjaw, Loopy, Squiddly Diddly, Snagglepuss, and Peter being unavailable. When an alien named Bleep crashes his ship into her lab and Cindy remembers him, she suddenly finds herself with a new best friend. To make sure nobody is lonely again, Cindy uses Bleep's DNA to make clones of him for everyone while advising them not to feed it anything spicy.
25	4	"Yogi's Midlife Crisis"	Careen Ingle	Yotam Perel	Yotam Perel	March 17, 2022	204
While watching home movies with Boo Boo, Yogi watches one about his cool jams and plans to start a rock band as Boo Boo suspect that he might be having a midlife crisis. After Yogi starts a rock band called Yogi's Midlife Crisis with Captain Caveman, Chopper, and Doggie Daddy, their off-tune music attracts the attention of Squiddly Diddly who improves their music enough for her to become a backup singer. At their first gig at Lambsy's birthday party, Squiddly outshines Yogi enough for him to become a solo artist.
26	5	"Jellystone Moon Platoon"	Aaron Austin	Aaron Austin	Raj Brueggemann	March 17, 2022	205
While celebrating 11 disaster-free days, Captain Caveman comes in to report about a rare cosmic event called the lunar eclipse where he claims that the Moon is going to eat the Sun in six hours which might cause the next ice age. This causes Mayor Huckleberry to have Mr. Jinks assemble a team of astronauts made from the three smartest people in Jellystone (consisting of Yogi, Snagglepuss, and Augie) to save the world from an impending disaster by launching them in a rocket from J.A.S.A (short for Jellystone Attempts Space Association) HQ.
27	6	"The Sea Monster of Jellystone Cove"	Aaron Austin	Ian Mutchler	Ian Mutchler	March 17, 2022	206
Feeling overworked, Jabberjaw persuades Magilla to give her and Loopy a break. Also in need of a break, Mayor Huckleberry and Mr. Jinks declare a beach day during Moby Dick's birthday by cancelling everyone's plans. To get their own space at Jellystone Cove when it becomes crowded, Jabberjaw and Loopy decide to dress up like sea monsters after being covered in seaweed by a high tide. While maintaining Jonny Quest and Hadji to serve them, Jabberjaw and Loopy's plan goes well until the citizens arrive to retake Jellystone Cove.
28	7	"Business"	Hannah Ayoubi	Meghan Lands	Meghan Lands	March 17, 2022	207
On role model day at Jellystone Elementary School, Bobbie Looey talks about her work as a businesswoman. Augie starts her own business just like her hero Bobbie. When Bobbie is called away, Augie works with Shag and Yakky to form a company called Jet Pack Karate Nugget Incorporated which they establish out of the Cattanooga Cheese Explosion. Checking on Augie, Bobby Looey states that her next step should be synergizing by doing mergers. Soon, Augie becomes too indulged in her role and transforms everything into corporate culture prompting Shag and Yakky to turn to Bobbie for help.
29	8	"Pants"	Hannah Ayoubi	Meghan Lands	Kaitlyn Graziano	March 17, 2022	208
Magilla is shown Snagglepuss' new show called "Jelly or Smelly" by Jabberjaw and Loopy that rates its citizens where Squiddly is deemed "Jelly" for showing off her new pants. Magilla starts to feel out of touch when the four-legged pants fad sweeps through Jellystone. In addition, Squiddly opens up a four-legged pants store next to Magilla's haberdashery. Magilla starts to go mad until everyone starts to experience the flaws of the four-legged pants. Now Squiddly must enlist Magilla for help to solve this catastrophe.
30	9	"Uh Oh! It's a Burglar!"	Careen Ingle	Careen Ingle	Charlie Gavin	March 17, 2022	209
Loopy has become annoyed that Wally Gator has been having a hard time picking a tie that Jabberjaw offers him. While Magilla in a vampire outfit goes to attend Jellystone's 17th Annual Haunted Horror Movie Spectacular that is hosted by Snagglepuss at Jellystone Theatre, he leaves Jabberjaw and Loopy in charge of his haberdashery. Jabberjaw and Loopy attempt to thwart a spooky nighttime burglary at Magilla's haberdashery when Magilla and the police are not answering their phones.
31	10	"It's a Mad Mad Mad Rat Race"	Careen Ingle	Yotam Perel	Yotam Perel	March 17, 2022	210
Lippy the Lion and Hardy Har Har have misplaced their treasure somewhere in Jellystone. Their talk about it is heard by everyone in Jellystone. After Snagglepuss reports on it, everyone tears apart Jellystone by frantically searching for Lippy and Hardy's misplaced treasure. When it comes to the different sightings, Yogi, Boo Boo, and Cindy interrogate Peter Potamus, Jabberjaw and Loopy interrogate Shazzan, and Augie, Shag, and Yakky interrogate Dirty Dawg where the information leads them to Morocco Mole's "Sauna, Sweat & Sandwiches".
32	11	"The Brave Little Daddy"	Aaron Austin	Ian Mutchler	Amy Hudkins	March 17, 2022	211
As Augie and Doggie Daddy are at the boardwalk, an alarm goes off as Grape Ape appears to eat all the food there. When Doggie Daddy is tasked by Mayor Huckleberry with stopping Grape Ape from terrorizing the town due to his parenting skills with Augie, a misunderstanding with Augie spirals out of control. When he confronts Grape Ape, he has a hard time getting through to Grape Ape until Cindy invents the Ape Daddy 5000 to help him out.
33	12	"The Big Stink"	Aaron Austin	C. H. Greenblatt	Ian Mutchler	March 17, 2022	212
Augie Doggie and Doggie Daddy have just finished watching 5,069 episodes of Scooby-Doo as Doggie Daddy goes out to get more popcorn only to find that Jellystone is clouded in a lot of bad smells. When the Jellystone Stink Factory has a catastrophic meltdown, it is up to Mildew Wolf, Yogi Bear, and Doggie Daddy to save everyone by removing its reactor core as they are the only ones immune to the smells for various reasons.
34	13	"Boo-Boo and Benny: Little Buddy Trouble"	Hannah Ayoubi	Hannah Ayoubi	Meghan Lands	March 17, 2022	213
Yogi and Top Cat go through their different activities with Boo Boo and Benny. After Boo Boo and Benny discover they have a ton in common and become friends following their grocery shopping at Barberas, they start to do different activities together while neglecting their duties. Yogi and Top Cat start to miss their respective best buddies as they work to find a way to return Boo Boo and Benny to them through whatever way possible.
35	14	"The Box Thief"	Hannah Ayoubi	C. H. Greenblatt	Kaitlyn Graziano	March 17, 2022	214
Everyone finds that the packages that Peter delivered to them are not on their front porches. As a result of this, discount detectives Snooper and Blabber are called in by Mayor Huckleberry to help find the culprit with Mayor Huckleberry planning to have Grape Ape kick the culprits out of Jellystone. Augie and Shag find out that Yakky was responsible due to her doing unboxing videos with them and enlist Peter to help put them back without them being caught.
36	15	"Jailcation"	Careen Ingle	Ian Wasseluk	Charlie Gavin	March 17, 2022	215
Following the latest scam during the holiday season, Top Cat finds that his gang has been exhausted and plans to scam a vacation. Top Cat's gang then sees Snagglepuss on the news interviewing Touché Turtle about Dread Baron's arrest and the description of Santo Relaxo Minimum Security Prison. Hoping to land in Santo Relaxo, Top Cat's gang try their best to get arrested by Touché only for the things they do to benefit everyone. When a disguised Top Cat reports a violation of the Clean-Shaven Baby Act of 1907, he learns that Touché sends people who commit crimes like that to Santo Paino as Top Cat's gang now must avoid the police.
37	16	"Balloon Kids"	Careen Ingle	Careen Ingle	Yotam Perel	March 17, 2022	216
El Kabong tells his students that they will be working to earn their Lil' Professional badges by working with a different adult in Jellystone for a day. While Lambsy and Cindy are assigned to work with Cindy Bear at the hospital and Ruff and Reddy are assigned to work with the police, Augie, Yakky, and Shag are assigned to help Peter and So-So on a delivery run in their balloon by delivering a package to Snagglepuss, but everything goes wrong like Peter being knocked out by Yanky Doodle Pigeon wanting bread, a "skypool" (So-So's name for a tornado), air sirens, and sky pirates.
38	17	"Augie's Baby"	Aaron Austin	Meghan Lands	Amy Hudkins	March 17, 2022	217
Augie and Yakky are playing with their dolls in the park as Augie states how she wished it was her baby where Doggie Daddy gets injured after Augie abducts a bald eagle chick. After accidentally trapping Yakky inside a watermelon that he dressed as a baby and called Melonie, Augie convinces herself that it has come to life as a baby. Yakky plays along during this time until they are invited by Brenda, Dee Dee, and Taffy to appear on Snagglepuss's new TV show at the Jellystone News Studio called "What's New, Baby?"
39	18	"Heroes and Capes"	Aaron Austin	Yotam Perel	Ian Mutchler	March 17, 2022	218
Mayor Huckleberry gets trapped in a sewer as Yogi and Winsome Witch end up falling in as well. As El Kabong tries to get them out, Blue Falcon and Dynomutt show up to help in the rescue. When everyone in town becomes a superhero after a pep talk from Blue Falcon, El Kabong begins to wonder if he's needed anymore as they get cats out of trees and go after villains like Mr. Smog, Hilarious P. Prankster, Mr. Hothead, and Captain Swipe. El Kabong takes on being a plumber until the locked manhole creates a giant gloop monster that attacks Jellystone.
40	19	"Sweet Dreams"	Ian Wasseluk	C. H. Greenblatt & Ian Wasseluk	C. H. Greenblatt, Meghan Lands & Yotam Perel	March 17, 2022	219
When Augie has a bad dream about a bagel monster, Doggie Daddy and others entertain her with a bedtime story. After Augie's Wobbly Womp claims that the monster under the bed might get her, other Jellystone citizens show up to tell different stories. Yogi, Boo Boo, and Cindy tell the story on how they tried to save the life of a sandwich. While Yogi carefully removed the tomato from the sandwich, they fail to get the beets out and the sandwich becomes soggy. Boo Boo holds a funeral for the sandwich. Captain Caveman tells the story on how he volunteered at the library when Wally Gator was looking for a book called "Moltar's Big Book of Fables and Slow Cooker Recipes" until it was found overdue because Benny forgot to return it while also using a fake ID. After a montage of random stories told by Magilla, Peter, El Kabong, Mildew, Snagglepuss and Loopy, Doggie Daddy calls in Mayor Huckleberry to do his attempt to get Augie to sleep as he tells the story revolving around Jellystone.

=== Season 3 (2024–25) ===
No. overall	No. in season	Title	Directed by	Story by	Storyboarded by	Original release date	Cartoon Network air date	Prod. code
41	1	"Meet the Jetsons" (Note: This episode is a half-hour special.)	Ron Stanage	C. H. Greenblatt	Julia Kaye	February 22, 2024	September 7, 2024	301
41	1	"Meet the Jetsons"	Ron Stanage	C. H. Greenblatt	Chivaun Fitzpatrick	February 22, 2024	September 7, 2024	301
In the future, killer robots have attacked Jellystone. Future versions of Ruff and Reddy are sent through the Jellystone Time Hole by Future Augie to the past. After an out of control flight through Jellystone, Future Ruff and Reddy inform Mayor Huckleberry and everyone present that they need a strikeforce of heroes to travel through time to save their future. El Kabong, Yogi, Captain Caveman, Doggie Daddy volunteer to help fight the futuristic threat only to end up one year in the future where they meet George Jetson, Jane Jetson, Elroy Jetson, Judy Jetson, their dog Astro, and Rosie the Robot Maid as Jellystone was rebuilt in the image of Spacely Space Sprockets run by Future Bobbie. Though Future Ruff and Reddy identify Rosie as the one who led the robot uprising.
42	2	"Disco Fever"	Tony Garth & Charlie Gavin	Meghan Lands, William Reiss & Ian Wasseluk	William Reiss	February 22, 2024	September 14, 2024	302
Mayor Huckleberry's old friend Cool Cat arrives in Jellystone which Mr. Jinks kept as a surprise. He proposes that they should bring back disco which Mayor Huckleberry is unable to do because of a lot of booty bumps that occur enough to shut the world down. When Cool Cat does a booty bump with Mr. Jinks that causes him to dance out of control, everyone in Jellystone gets infected. Mayor Huckleberry enlists Yogi and Cindy to help find a cure for the disco fever before things get worse.
43	3	"Cindy vs. Noodle Arms"	Maxwell Atoms & Charlie Gavin	Jordan Morris	Yotam Perel	February 22, 2024	September 14, 2024	303
Wally Gator comes into Cindy Bear's office claiming that his arms are "haunted". She looks up the symptoms in his Big Book of Ailments and finds that Wally has the symptoms of Noodle Arm Syndrome. After Wally went to get a second opinion from a "less boring doctor", Cindy rants about it in the park as she overhears Top Cat pitching his revolutionary product known as Snake Cream. She gets the idea to turn to Top Cat for help dealing with patients who get bored hearing her medical advice as he walks Cindy through the steps of not being boring to anyone. Though she is put to the test when more Noodle Arm Syndromes occur in Jellystone.
44	4	"Hot Guys, Cold Turkey"	Ron Stanage	Jordan Morris	Julia Kaye	February 22, 2024	September 21, 2024	304
As Cindy Bear talks to Yogi Bear and Boo Boo about what each of them are married to, they see Jabberjaw chasing after some people with Magilla Gorilla and Loopy De Loop chasing after her. After Cindy uses a large taser to subdue Jabberjaw, she diagnoses Jabberjaw with having a problem with her Inner Cupid. Cindy tries to remedy it with a helmet called at Hottie Blocker. After it overloads in the park, Cindy examines Jabberjaw again and finds her Inner Cupid acting unstable causing Cindy to perform an Inner Cupid-Ectomy. Once that is done and Jabberjaw is in "low energy mode", Cindy, Magilla, and Loopy must get Jabberjaw's Inner Cupid back.
45	5	"Lotions 11"	Ron Stanage	Maxwell Atoms	Careen Ingle	February 22, 2024	September 21, 2024	305
Top Cat has been detained at the Jellystone Police Department as he is visited by his gang posing as his mothers. He explains to his gang that he got arrested following a scheme involving planting poison ivy around Jellystone and got a head start planting them where he forgot that Jellystone was planted on a giant pile of manure causing it to spread faster as well as King not being present with the giant container of anti-itch cream in exchange for not posting those photos. Top Cat advises his gang to pick one of each other to lead in his place and obtain the itch cream.
46	6	"LAFF Games"	Nathan Bulmer	C. H. Greenblatt	Sam Lane	February 22, 2024	September 28, 2024	306
The LAFF games between Jellystone (which loses every year) and their undefeated rivals New Bedrock is occurring. While the winning team will be awarded a beautiful trophy, the losing town's mayor must wear the Chicken Suit of Shame....especially embarrassing for Mayor Huckleberry Hound given his family's tragic history with chickens. Snagglepuss and Mildew Wolf cover the event as a reliable source tells Snagglepuss that this will be Jellystone's year. Mayor Huckleberry gathers his team stating that this losing streak must come to an end and objects to Yogi Bear calling the team the Yogi Yahooeys. The Really Rottens led by Mayor Dick Dastardly and Muttley arrive. As the competition heats up, Mayor Huckleberry learns from Mr. Jinks that the Really Rottens actually cheat during the LAFF games causing both mayors to end up in a deal that involves the final winner take all event.
47	7	"Frankenhooky"	Nathan Bulmer	Tyler Hendrix	Tyler Hendrix	February 22, 2024	September 28, 2024	307
It is 5:00 at Jellystone Hospital. Yogi Bear is told by Ranger Smith that he has to do an inventory on the single jar of cotton balls first thing in the morning as Ranger Smith is too busy dealing with the hospital's bedpan shortage. Boo Boo mentions to Yogi that he replaced his usual scrubs with shiny scrubs that the patients keep mistaking for bedpans. They get the idea to play hooky from work. With Cindy Bear and Ranger Smith come looking for them, Yogi and Boo Boo sneak off into the woods and stumble upon the abandoned Cheese World theme park. When Goober and the Ghost Chasers show up looking for ghosts, Yogi and Boo Boo disguise themselves as Frankenstein monsters and get chased by them until Scooby-Doo and Mystery Inc. come into view.
48	8	"Girl, You My Friend!"	Maxwell Atoms	William Reiss	William Reiss	February 22, 2024	October 5, 2024	308
Jellystone Television has a show called "Girl, You My Friend!" which stars Elektra, Flirtacia, Zelda the Ostrich, and Charlie the Robot. It is watched by Cindy Bear, Jabberjaw, Loopy De Loop, and Squiddly Diddly. As Cindy, Jabberjaw, and Squiddly compare themselves to Elektra, they partake in a contest where whoever does the most good deeds will be the Elektra of their group. Cindy holds the door open for Yogi who is carrying sandwiches into the hospital, Squiddly gives Snagglepuss a 20% discount card to Hugs R Us, and Jabberjaw gives excellent customer service to Maw Rugg. When Mayor Huckleberry Hound hears about their contest, he informs them that Jellystone can't handle this many good deed doers and has them hug it out at the Jellystone Friendship Colosseum.
49	9	"Jellystone Noir"	Maxwell Atoms	Maxwell Atoms	Maxwell Atoms	February 22, 2024	October 5, 2024	309
After Augie Doggie, Shag Rugg, and Yakky Doodle watch Captain Caveman be harassed by a bee, Shag is not feeling the humor in that. Yakky looks up the symptoms and finds that Shag has lost his childhood wonder. After some kid shenanigans fail to make Shag feel "young again", Augie and Yakky take Shag to Jellystone's Detective District where they enlist Inch High, Undercover Elephant, and Snooper and Blabber find Shag's lost childhood wonder. The detectives help look for Shag's lost childhood wonder and retract the steps that involved Shag purchasing a sweaty sandwich from Morocco Mole and watching Captain Caveman's fight with a bee causing the detectives to go on a stakeout and then retrace their own steps.
50	10	"Vote Raspberry"	Nathan Bulmer	Ben Gruber	Sam Lane	February 22, 2024	October 12, 2024	310
Mayor Huckleberry Hound prepares for his latest speech to the people of Jellystone. He announces that today is Election Day as Yogi Bear states that Mayor Huckleberry always runs unopposed since nobody will run against him. Depressed by the lack of opponents, Mayor Huckleberry leads Mr. Jinks into a plan to run against himself where he uses the alias of Raspberry Rover who does the opposite of what Mayor Huckleberry does. Mr. Jinks later tells Mayor Huckleberry that Raspberry Rover is doing a little too well against Mayor Huckleberry and that Mayor Huckleberry's approval ratings have gone low enough to reach the bad place and hit the Red Guy in the eye. This causes Mayor Huckleberry to pull of a trick so that he can "debate against himself".
51	11	"Collection Protection"	Tony Garth	Tyler Hendrix	Tyler Hendrix	February 22, 2024	October 12, 2024	311
Peter Potamus shows Augie Doggie, Shag Rugg, and Yakky Doodle his anime figure collection. Then he asks them to guard his stash from his rival Little Rok while he is away as he also gives them a button that would be the last resort against Little Rok. While guarding the anime figure collection, Augie, Shag, and Yakky watch the Hong Kong Phooey franchise. Afterwards, they find that everything is gone and are now advertised on a commercial for Little Rok's Big Museum of Anime and Manga Memorabilia. Augie, Shag, and Yakky enter Little Rok's Big Museum of Anime and Manga Memorabilia to steal back Peter Potamus' anime figure collection as they get through every one of its defenses.
52	12	"Mummy Knows Best"	Tony Garth	Kevin Kramer	Jojo Ramos Patrick	February 22, 2024	October 19, 2024	312
While teaching his class about creation that involved a person named Hanna and another person named Barbera, El Kabong springs into action when Peter Potamus accidentally spilled his boba tea on the steering wheel. Peter Potamus jumps on El Kabong and Peter Potamus' balloon strikes both of them. At Jellystone Hospital, Yogi Bear, Boo Boo, and Cindy Bear tell El Kabong that this is the first time he's broken every bone in his body and that he won't be doing much for a year. After wondering who will teach the students, El Kabong calls in a favor from Hadji to be the substitute teacher only for a mummy on display in Quest Bowl's museum/arcade to awaken and end up answering the phone while Hadji is fighting with Jonny Quest over the tacky wallpaper. Watching from his hospital window, El Kabong has Yogi, Boo Boo, and Cindy do all the physical therapy at once so that he can get better and deal with the mummy.
53	13	"Augie-Mented Reality"	Kaitlyn Graziano	Kevin Kramer	Yotam Perel	February 22, 2024	October 19, 2024	313
After taking Augie Doggie to school, Doggie Daddy is sad to be apart from her and wishes for more Augies to love. Witnessing Cindy Bear use her Replicationizer 1999 on Yogi Bear's single hamburger patty by copy-pasting the patty's molecular structure onto a nearby flower pot, Doggie Daddy borrows it and has it copy Augie's molecular structure where he has it copy-pasted on Boo Boo. Then he does the same thing to everyone else in town. This causes Doggie Daddy to take the attention from the real Augie causing Cindy to give her a Replicationizer 1998 to copy-pasted Doggie Daddy's molecular structure onto other civilians. With every copy having each other, Augie and Doggie Daddy must reunite with each other.
54	14	"Space Con"	Ron Stanage & Tony Garth	Jordan Morris	Toby Jones	February 22, 2024	October 26, 2024	314
It is the 10th bi-annual Jellystone Sci-Fi Fish Fry Convention as Snagglepuss reports that everyone is attending to meet Space Ghost. Peter Potamus rambles on how his Space Ghost costume is not good enough when it comes to him meeting Space Ghost and that he lacks some power bands like the ones that Space Ghost has. After Space Ghost stains his costume on spaghetti sauce and he places his power bands onto a table while sending Jan, Jace, and Blip to look for an unsullied space uniform, Augie Doggie, Shag Rugg, and Yakky Doodle stumble into Space Ghost's dressing room and borrow his power bands. Things get worse when Space Ghost villains Zorak, Brak, and Moltar infiltrate the convention as the Galaxy Trio to target Space Ghost with a "space roast" as they end up fighting Peter.
55	15	"Sha-Zogi"	Ron Stanage	Jordan Morris	Julia Kaye	February 22, 2024	October 26, 2024	315
At Jellystone Hospital, Yogi Bear comes in as Cindy Bear shows him a packed waiting room of different medical cases that they all woke up with. A half-kangaroo version of Mayor Huckleberry Hound sheds some light on these medical cases by showing security footage that reveals that Shazzan was sleep-magicking. When Yogi and Cindy find Shazzan barely staying awake while operating on Wally Gator, they learn that he has been working 23 jobs due to crushing student loan debts. As Cindy suggests that Shazzan takes a vacation, Yogi persuades Shazzan to let him cover for Shazzan as he gains Shazzan's unlimited magic powers and the schedule to Shazzan's occupations. Though Yogi doesn't hear Shazzan's instructions and causes havoc by giving everyone unlimited magic powers even when it comes to not dealing with a slumbering beast that wakes up every 1,000 years to feed on screams.
56	16	"Lil' Honk Honks"	Tony Garth	Kevin Kramer	Jojo Ramos Patrick	February 22, 2024	November 2, 2024	316
A commercial is shown about the car-building product called Lil' Honk Honks from Biscuit Co. which is the maker of Dr. Grandma's Itch Cream and Hand Pillows. Shag Rugg plays with his father's old Lil' Honk Honks at his father's suggestion as he shows it to Augie Doggie and Yakky Doodle. Soon, Yogi Bear, Jabberjaw, Peter Potamus, and the other adults get in on the fun. When Shag speaks out against the adults hogging the track, a big Lil' Hon Honks Grand Prix commentated by Snagglepuss and Mildew Wolf occurs where the winner will play with the Lil' Honk Honks track as Cindy shrinks everybody so that they can ride them.
57	17	"Epic Rager"	Kaitlyn Graziano	Maxwell Atoms	Yotam Perel	February 22, 2024	November 2, 2024	317
Mayor Huckleberry Hound gives his thanks to everyone for coming to the Jellystone Plaza party where they celebrate their hard-fought victory against the invasion of the sewer people where Birdman was the only casualty. Despite having Captain Caveman as the DJ at the party, it doesn't go well when the other guests don't enjoy it. To help out Mayor Huckleberry, Captain Caveman enlists his Neanderthal cousins who threw the biggest party of the century to turn it into an epic rager. Upon Captain Caveman unfreezing his cousins from the Valley of the Dinosaurs, they start doing things that turn it into an epic rager. When Cindy Bear's smart watch states that the party levels are reaching dangerous territory, Mayor Huckleberry enlists Captain Caveman to find a way to shut down the epic rager before a big disaster that would end it occurs.
58	18	"Snowdodio"	Nathan Bulmer	Maxwell Atoms	Sam Lane	March 6, 2025	December 7, 2025	318
58	18	"Snowdodio"	Nathan Bulmer	Maxwell Atoms	Tyler Hendrix	March 6, 2025	December 7, 2025	318
It's Snowdodio in Jellystone, when magic snowmen appear to cool the weather by barfing snow. The residents are then supposed to bake a giant calzone for the snowmen to take back to Florida for spring break. But this year, Augie insists on keeping a snowman as a pet, and others follow. The snowmen keep Jellystone freezing all the way to mid-April. Doggie Daddy turns to Race Bannon for help. Using a spider vehicle, and with help from the Great Grape Ape, Bannon and Doggie Daddy subdue the snowmen. But Augie uses a song to persuade them not to melt the snowmen. The residents decide to join the snowmen in Florida.
59	19	"Crisis on Infinite Mirths"	Maxwell Atoms	Jordan Morris	Dodge Greenley	March 6, 2025	May 25, 2025	337
Cindy starts to feel mistreated in town, as everyone starts to ignore her. However, she meets a big-nosed kid named Billy, who was kicked out of his own universe. Cindy then encounters two another strangers: a destructive ballerina named Dee Dee, and Mojo Jojo, the evilest villain from the City of Townsville. Cindy gathers Billy, Dee Dee, and Mojo to the town hall with Mayor Huckleberry questioning them on how they got here. Dee Dee starts to have a flashback, but Cindy stops her and instead uses a Mental Trans-modulator to see through their minds. In each footage, it reveals how the three out-of-towners came to Jellystone: Dexter banished Dee Dee here from their universe so he wouldn’t have to put up with her antics, Billy was thrown into a portal by the Grim Reaper so he could see another universe (but he took the TV remote with him which left Grim and Mandy stuck watching the Justice Friends anime Billy was watching), and the Powerpuff Girls punched Mojo to get rid of him once and for all. Cindy feels bad for them after seeing how awful they were treated (though she also understands Grim and Dexter's actions, while ironically thinking the Powerpuff Girls are villains). They all came here from a source known as "The Jellystone Timehole", originally a normal hole in space and time but draws attention to the multiverse that brought Billy, Dee Dee, and Mojo in the first place. Huckleberry awaits for them to return home but Cindy and Mojo inform them that it has become unstable, and it could destroy reality if more characters enter through the portal. At night, Cindy and Mojo continue to analyze the time hole showing the instability increasing, starting to bond together that following day. However they weren’t aware that Fred Fredburger has recently emerged from it. The next day, Billy becomes Doggie Daddy and Augie's "dog", much to his delight, and Dee Dee is assigned to Jabberjaw to be her guide, and they have fun with each other by breaking stuff and dancing. Meanwhile, in Dexter's Lab in Genius Grove, Dexter begins to admit that his achievements mean nothing without his sister around to challenge him, even calling her "his annoying Mount Everest". In Townsville, the Powerpuff Girls find out that the villains lost their motivation to do crime ever since Mojo's disappearance, making the Girls feel like they aren't complete without him. Meanwhile, in Billy's house in Endsville, Grim and Mandy only want Billy back for the TV remote he took with him, however Grim gets hooked onto the Justice Friends anime. Back in Jellystone, the time hole goes critical as more Cartoon Network characters start popping out of the time hole. Cindy and Mojo become concerned about the situation; Cindy suggests they need to stay focused on the time hole before the Powerpuff Girls grab Mojo and prepare to take him back but Cindy, using her own mecha, attacks the Girls. Mojo is impressed by this and gets in his mecha to compliment Cindy, but their conversation is interrupted when Cindy is attacked by Dexter in his Robo-Dexo 2000. Soon, more Cartoon Network characters from different universes emerge from portals and engage in a huge battle between them, the Jellystone Residents, and Mojo Jojo. Becoming overwhelmed, Mojo confesses his love for Cindy, much to the Powerpuff Girls’ confusion. Dexter is likewise confused when he realizes that the Jellystone Residents are fond of Dee Dee. Grim and Mandy find Billy with Doggie Daddy and Augie Doggie; Grim demands the remote but Billy states he gave it to Dee Dee who destroys it after pressing it, much to Grim’s horror. Eduardo tells everyone that Jellystone is friendly as proof that he has befriended the Eds. Huckleberry and the Mayor of Townsville end the fight by declaring a truce and that their reality will not explode. This is not the case as Mojo reveal that it will explode in 15 seconds, only to be averted by Fred Fredburger clogging up the time hole after he used it as a bathroom. With the situation resolved, Billy and Grim send the Cartoon Network characters back to their own worlds. Dexter feels bad for Mojo and Cindy as he's already started to ship them. Mojo says he isn't worried about it though, right before Grim throws him back to Townsville. Later that night, Cindy sits on her couch when she suddenly has an idea. She uses a machine which allows her to talk to Mojo anytime. The two reunite with Mojo happy to see her while hoping that nothing bad will happen to Cartoon Network (a jab to how the network was mistreated by Warner Bros. Discovery lately), only to change static to Cheese and Fred Fredburger.
60	20	"Heavens to Murgatroyd"	Ron Stanage	Jordan Morris	Julia Kaye	March 6, 2025	June 1, 2025	320
In Murgatroyd Manor, Sir Magilla of Magillington tells his three daughters, Jabberjaw, Cindy, and Loopy, that they must marry. Doctor Yogi connects with Loopy, and Cindy falls for Cowboy Peter Potamus. Sir Snaggle of Pussington tries to woo Jabber, but she finds him self-absorbed. Instead, she falls in love with Stableboy Kabong. Jabber comes up with a plan for Kabong to become king by winning the annual Werewolf Hunt. But the rising Moon reveals that Kabong himself is the werewolf Fangface. Snaggle catches Fangface by having his squire Tubbs raise the Sun, but Jabber uses magic to bring the Moon back. Fangface then bites Jabber and "catches" her, and then bites everyone else. King Fangface and Queen Jabber have a werewolf fashion show and wedding. The ending reveals that this was all a novel written by Jabber for her bookclub as Cindy voiced her dismay about a cowboy involvement.
61	21	"Spy Thriller"	Ron Stanage	Maxwell Atoms	Toby Jones	March 6, 2025	June 1, 2025	319
The town gathers in the park for a screening of "Live and Let Squirrel", wherein Secret Squirrel and Agent Polly are surrounded by enemy spies. Doggie Daddy gets stuck in a long line for snacks, and so he sends a stranger to check up on Augie Doggy and Shag Rugg. The stranger's unexpected appearance makes Augie think that she's surrounded by spies as well. When Doggy Daddy returns, Shag explains that Augie has gone deep undercover. Doggie Daddy mistakes Huckleberry Hound for Augie in disguise, and thinks a cosplaying Snagglepuss is a real movie villain. But he realizes the truth when Snagglepuss saves the dogs from falling from a great height. Augie pulls Doggie Daddy into her hiding place, inside Hair Bear's hair.
62	22	"Chair Me Matey"	Nathan Bulmer	Kevin Kramer	Sam Lane	March 6, 2025	June 8, 2025	321
Yogi airs out his beloved "Tush Pusher" massaging chair on the street, only for Captain Swipe to steal it. Yogi and Boo Boo join Swipe's crew of villains from Yogi's Ark Lark, but learn that Swipe's friend Moby Dick sold the chair to a store on Dad's Gifts Island. Determined to get his chair back, Yogi rallies the pirate crew to pillage the store. Just when Yogi is about to kill store owner Nugget Nose, Moby appears with money to buy chairs for everyone.
63	23	"Choir Choir, Pants on Fire"	Nathan Bulmer	Tyler Hendrix	Tyler Hendrix	March 6, 2025	June 8, 2025	322
During a book club, Cindy becomes embarrassed after she accidentally mispronounces the word choir. She insists that her pronunciation was the original pronunciation from an ancient civilization. When Mayor Huck tries to excavate the civilization, Cindy plants fake artifacts, including a pronunciation chart. But her reading the chart resurrects the Vulture People. They attack the Jellystone residents, but also insist they don't pronounce "choir" Cindy's way. Cindy then claims that her pronunciation is from another ancient civilization and makes another fake chart. But that chart revives the Stone People, who go to war against the Vulture People and also deny Cindy's pronunciation. At that point, Cindy's rage at being called wrong gives her super powers that she uses to defeat both tribes.
64	24	"Better Off Fred"	Kaitlyn Graziano	Jordan Morris	Dodge Greenley	March 6, 2025	June 15, 2025	323
After an injury, Captain Caveman discovers that he was Barney Rubble during prehistoric ages. He becomes dedicated to reviving his best friend, Fred Flintstone. First he has other residents audition for portraying Fred, but they fail. Barney/Captain then finds Fred's remains and tries to clone him, but the small gremlin-like clone goes on a rampage. Barney/Captain tries to tame the clone by getting it to remember the good times, but then he realizes that Fred treated him like a second-class caveman. So he gives up his quest and goes back to being just Captain Caveman. The Gremlin Fred is then snatched up by a large bird. A memorium is shown of the real Fred Flintstone involving images of Fred doing disrepective stuff.
65	25	"The Mountain Jumpers"	Kaitlyn Graziano	Kevin Kramer	Yotam Perel	March 6, 2025	June 15, 2025	324
Shag Rugg uses an app to make a video that appears to show Yakkie Doodle jumping over Mt. Killemalljaro with a motorcycle. But people mistake the video for real, and Mayor Huck pressures Yakkie to do the stunt live to draw needed tourist dollars. The kids turn to the Devlin crew for help, but they arrive on the day of the stunt. Ernie Devlin decides to strap a rocket on Yakkie's back so she can make the jump. But Yakkie crashes on the mountainside instead and ends up hanging from a branch. Ernie, his sister Sandy, Shag and Augie try to rescue Yakkie, but they all wind up hanging from the branch. But Mayor Huck tells them their predicament is drawing lots of tourists, and they should hang there until the town breaks even. The twist ending reveals that the whole story was a video Shag used an app to make.
66	26	"Jellystone! The Boardgame!"	Ron Stanage	Kevin Kramer	Julia Kaye	March 6, 2025	June 22, 2025	326
For the Great Grape Ape's birthday, Mayor Huck has the whole town converted to a giant board game designed for the Grape Ape to win easily. But the Grape Ape still wants to play, and plays the board game over a thousand times before the people force Mayor Huck to make the Grape Ape stop. The Grape Ape cooperates, but the next day he tries again to play with the people and objects he used in the game. Mayor Huck forces the Grape Ape to stop by destroying the board game's giant dice, sending a crying Grape Ape to the seashore. There, Mayor Huck sees the Grape Ape play with a sailboat, and he realizes that what the Grape Ape really liked was playing with objects his own size. So he makes the Grape Ape the Director of Moving Large Objects Around.
67	27	"The Floodgates of Love"	Ron Stanage	Ben Gruber	Toby Jones	March 6, 2025	June 22, 2025	327
Jabberjaw's sister invites everyone to her wedding, taking place in Sealab. Jabber asks Tubb to be her platonic escort. At Sealab, Jabber reunites with her dad, the original Jabberjaw. But Tubb discovers that Jabber's sister is Scooby the Seal, and she's marrying his former friend, Tom. The unexpected reunion greatly upsets everyone. Tubb explains to Jabber that he, Tom and Scooby used to form a team with Moby Dick. Over the years, Tubb fell in love with Scooby. But one day he caught Scooby and Tom kissing. He felt so heartbroken that he called Tom a "smelly poo-poo boogerhead" and ran away. Jabber advises him to stop running and make up. Later on, Jabber patches things up with Scooby, and urges her to go on with the wedding, while Tubb and Tom do reconcile. Captain Michael Murphy presides over the wedding, declaring at the end to "let the floodgates of love open". Tubb misunderstands and opens Sealab's floodgates, flooding the sea base much to the dismay of Captain Murphy. Sealab then explodes.
68	28	"Jelly Robo Battle Royale"	Nathan Bulmer	Jordan Morris	Sam Lane	March 6, 2025	June 29, 2025	325
Cindy Bear builds Frankenstein, Jr., for the Jellystone kids team in the Jelly Robo Battle Royale. But Frankenstein, Jr, turns out too straight-laced a character, only interested in teaching the kids pro-social lessons. In desperation, Cindy dresses the kids up in disguises and has them pretend to be battling robots. At the Battle Royale the robots from New Bedrock wallop the Jellystone kids, leaving their disguises in tatters. Cindy then alerts Frankenstein, Jr., that the New Bedrock team is "littering", and so Frankenstein, Jr., rushes in and beats the robots easily. The robots turn out to be the New Bedrock kids in disguise as well. The Jellystone kids win a pizza party, but Frankenstein, Jr., objects because pizza is greasy junk food.
69	29	"Third Wheelie"	Nathan Bulmer	Tyler Hendrix	Tyler Hendrix	March 6, 2025	June 29, 2025	328
When Yogi and Boo-Boo miss their carpool, Yogi uses his phone to hire a ride. But he accidentally uses a "friend app". The app sends Wheelie the talking car to them. Wheelie offers to take the bears to work, but he then spends hours talking about his boring interests. On the ride home, Yogi inadvertently invites Wheelie to come back next morning. The bears commit to telling Wheelie that they don't want to hang out with him. But Wheelie doesn't show up next morning. After a long search, the bears find Wheelie at the Mudbug Cafe, but Wheelie runs away. Determined to confront Wheelie, the bears stalk him all over town, until they get arrested by Touché Turtle. In jail, Wheelie explains that he's now good friends with Mildew Wolf and that he couldn't bring himself to break the news to the bears. The bears are actually happy that Wheelie found someone who wanted to be his friend, but still have to stay in jail because everyone went home for the night.
70	30	"The Jellystone Crumpler"	Kaitlyn Graziano	Ron Stanage	Dodge Greenley	March 6, 2025	July 6, 2025	329
To his horror, Doggie Daddy discovers that Augie Doggy has been sleepwalking, during which she hugs people so hard she crumples them. With Shag Rugg's and Yakkie Doodle's help, Doggie Daddy tries to restrain her while she sleeps. But Augie breaks free and ends up crumpling Snagglepuss during a live news broadcast. The still sleeping Augie gets sentenced to prison by Judge Granny Sweet. Desperate to clear her name, Doggie Daddy disguises himself and the kids as masked villains, and then he claims they did the crumpling. Augie, still sleeping, is released, but Doggie Daddy and the kids wind up arrested. Doggie Daddy lets Augie hug him one last time. But his love for Augie is so strong that it repels Augie's crumpling power to the outside. Augie finally awakens, but now the rest of the world is crumpled.
71	31	"Turn Your Head and Trough"	Kaitlyn Graziano	Ben Gruber	Yotam Perel	March 6, 2025	July 6, 2025	331
The bears find a long line for lunch at the Mudbug Cafe. But Yogi is so hungry that he eats slop from a nearby pig trough instead. Yogi actually likes that way of eating, and so eating slop straight from a trough becomes a fad in Jellystone. But then a shadowy group orders the Cafe to stop serving troughs. Then the group kidnaps Yogi. The group reveals its name as SPOON, with a mission of forcing people to use utensils to eat neatly. Lambsy is the leader, and the group includes Magilla, Lady Constance, J. Whimple Dimple, and Grape Ape as members. A defiant Yogi escapes, with the Grape Ape throwing giant utensils at him. Yogi ultimately outsmarts the group by breaking off the head of a giant spoon and using it to eat garbage. With Lady Constance accidentally getting crushed by the giant spoon thrown by Grape Ape, SPOON has to concede that Yogi can eat slop so long as he uses a giant spoon instead of a trough.
72	32	"Kabong Along with Me"	Ron Stanage	Ben Gruber	Julia Kaye	March 6, 2025	July 13, 2025	330
Blue Falcon and Space Ghost persuade El Kabong to hire a new sidekick. During the interview session, Dinky Dalton steals El Kabong's guitar, but Yakky Doodle accidentally catches him. So El Kabong makes Yakky his sidekick "Little Gong", but Yakky is too terrified to go on El Kabong's missions. Space Ghost then recruits El Kabong, Blue Falcon, and their sidekicks to stop a swarm of "Meat-eors" from crashing into Jellystone. They all reduce the meteors to small meatballs, but El Kabong now fears that the people of Jellystone will eat the raw meatballs and get painful gas. Yakky saves the day by suggesting that they cook the meatballs.
73	33	"Thundarr the Barber-barian"	Ron Stanage	Ben Gruber	Toby Jones	March 6, 2025	July 13, 2025	334
Jabberjaw, Magilla, and Loopy all visit Thundarr the Barbarian's salon at the same time. They accuse each other of stealing the last can of sparkling water from work. Each colleague tells Thundarr their story; Jabberjaw and Magilla glorify themselves in their stories, Loopy tells a story in the avant-garde style, and all their stories end with the haberdashery exploding. Thundarr warns that the trio is putting their friendship in danger. It's then revealed that the storytelling are actually a scenario Thundarr describes to get the trio to make up. When they leave, Thundarr reveals that he himself stole the can, but Ookla and Ariel force him to admit the truth to the trio. Thundarr leaves the trio among the wreckage of their shop with a new 12-pack of sparkling water. The twist ending reveals that this is all a story Ookla is telling some child age Moks.
74	34	"Yogi Juice"	Nathan Bulmer	Sam Lane	Sam Lane	March 6, 2025	July 20, 2025	332
While treating Mildew Wolf, Cindy Bear notices that Yogi Bear always has good luck. So she secretly extracts his "Yogi Juice" and gives it to Mildew, curing all his problems. The other townsfolk see Mildew and make Cindy give them Yogi Juice as well. But they keep demanding more as the juice wears off over time. Soon, the townsfolk use so much Yogi Juice that they inflate into bloated giants that ravage the town. Yogi himself has shriveled up to a tiny version of himself due to the extractions. Cindy finally decides to deflate everyone of their Yogi Juice, restoring them to normal size. She's able to return the juice to Yogi, but Yogi is left deformed until the juice correctly settles in.
75	35	"Dr. Kabong, Professional Therapist"	Nathan Bulmer	Tyler Hendrix	Tyler Hendrix	March 6, 2025	July 20, 2025	333
El Kabong finds Benny refusing to work in Top Cat's schemes, leaving Top Cat depressed. He then becomes a therapist to help the townspeople's emotional issues. But Boo Boo reveals to him that his advice is making people more miserable. Boo Boo tells El Kabong to "look inside" for a solution. So El Kabong inverts his eyes and meets his inner therapist. The inner therapist says Kabong needs to provide the townspeople the tools to solve their problems. So El Kabong buys guitars for everyone to kabong each other until they feel better. El Kabong turns his practice over to Tubbs and Mayor Huck makes the kabonging an annual event called Kabongmas.
76	36	"Theme Work Makes the Dream Work"	Maxwell Atoms	Jordan Morris	William Reiss	March 6, 2025	July 27, 2025	335
Yogi learns that Squiddly Diddly is creating theme songs for everyone; the songs play whenever they walk through a door. So Yogi sees Squidly to undergo the process of finding his own theme. But the theme song makes him look gross and stupid. Yogi is so devastated that he hides in the broom closet. Squiddly explains to Yogi's friends that the process involves offering a piece of one's own soul to the Demon of Ur, from which he determines one's true self. Yogi's friends defy the theme and perform their own theme song for Yogi, restoring his self esteem. Squifdly then summons the Demon of Ur who agrees to return to Yogi the piece of his soul.
77	37	"Marinara Madness"	Maxwell Atoms	Kevin Kramer	William Reiss	March 6, 2025	July 27, 2025	336
Yogi and Boo Boo take Jabberjaw, Loopy, Peter and Shazzan on a camping trip. Shazzan tries to use magic to get them to the campsite, but he zaps everyone to the edge of nowhere instead. While looking for food, Boo Boo and Shazzan stumble on the tomato farm of the Herculoids. The Herculoids mistake the campers for thieves and threaten to cook them in their marinara sauce. Yogi scoffs at the quality of their sauce, leading to a marinara sauce cook-off where the losers get cooked. Yogi gives the team a pep talk, citing the skills they have. But they apparently lose; later on, Jinx pours a jar of Herculoids marinara sauce that has the Jellystone friends stuffed inside.
