= Kathy Gori =

American actress

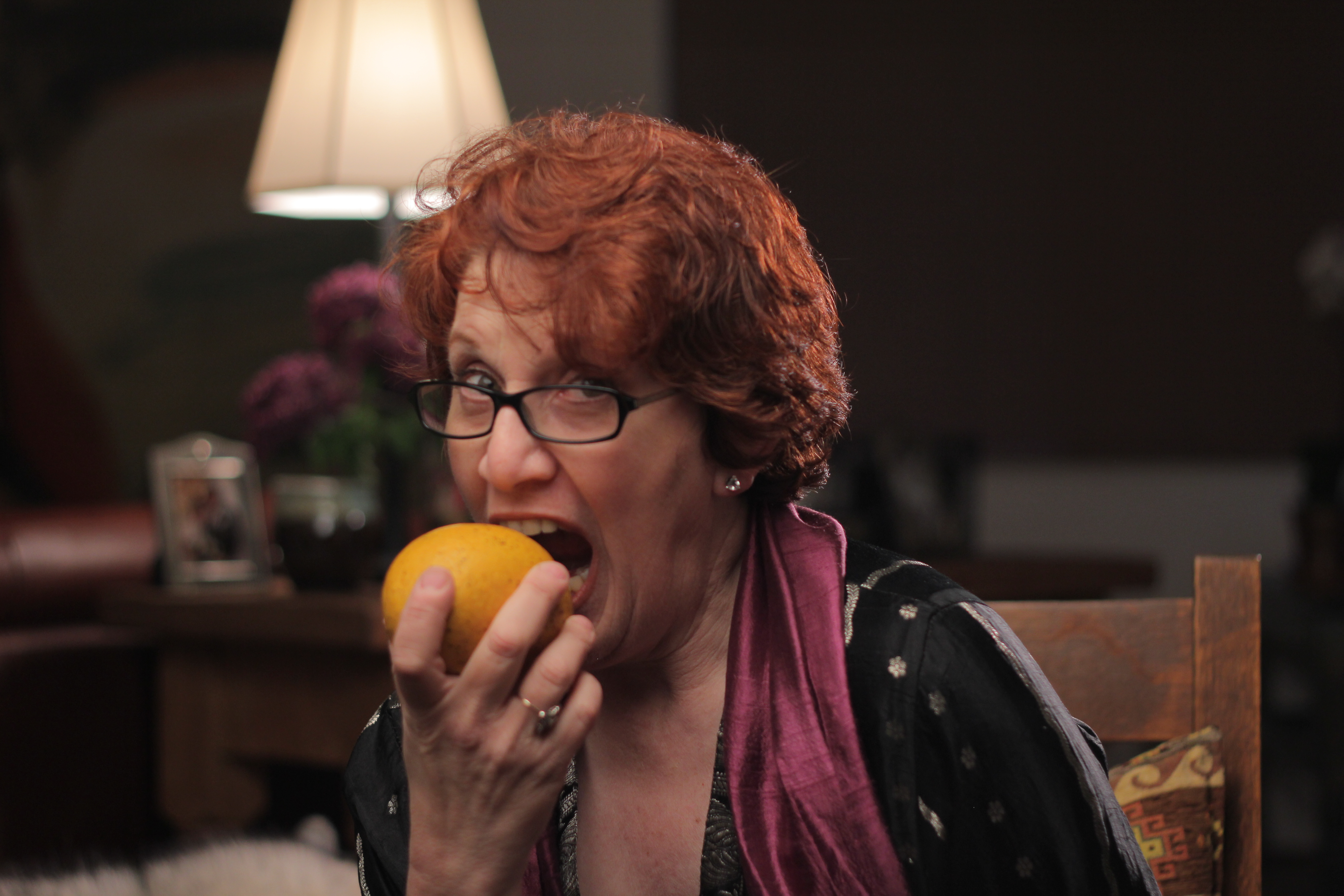
- Kathy Gori eating a mango in 2011
- Born: March 19, 1951 (age 75); San Francisco, California, U.S.
- Occupations: Voice actress, radio personality, screenwriter
- Years active: 1972–present
- Spouse: Alan Berger (m. 1979)

Kathy Gori (born March 19, 1951) is an American voice actress, radio personality and screenwriter.

== Biography ==
She was born in San Francisco, California.

Gori co-wrote two original feature comedies, And Spaulding Gets Nothing for Walt Disney Pictures and Andrew Gunn Productions, and Henchman vs. Sidekick for Revolution Studios and Broken Road Productions. She also co-wrote the feature film, Desperate Moves (1981) and co-wrote the Warner Bros. Pictures film, Chaos Theory (2007), starring Ryan Reynolds.

Gori did numerous voices for Hanna-Barbera, such as Laurie in Inch High Private Eye (1973), Rosemary the Telephone Operator in the cartoon series, Hong Kong Phooey (1974), Katie Butler in Valley of the Dinosaurs (1974) and additional voices on The Tom & Jerry Show (1975). In addition, she voiced Gidget in Gidget Makes the Wrong Connection (1972), and DePatie–Freleng's Bailey's Comets.

She has had a successful career in radio, voice-overs and commercials. She was an all night rock jock at KMPC in Los Angeles, California, KIIS and TENQ. Between 1996 and 2000 she was co-host of KPFK radio's Up For Air, which received the 1997 National Federation of Community Broadcasters Silver Reel (i.e. runner-up) award for "Morning Public Affairs Program".

She has done commercials for Taco Bell, Dodge, the Gap, Honda and many others. She won a Clio Award for her achievements in this field. She also recorded songs and voices for Sesame Street and dubbed voices in numerous movies.

Gori and her husband Alan Berger are screenwriting partners and have worked at most of the major Hollywood Studios. She also writes a food blog called The Colors of Indian Cooking. The site offers recipes, how-tos and stories from her twenty-one years' experience of Indian cuisine.

== Filmography ==
- The ABC Saturday Superstar Movie - episode - Gidget Makes the Wrong Connection - Frances 'Gidget' Lawrence (1972)
- Inch High, Private Eye - 13 episodes - Laurie (1973)
- Bailey's Comets - 4 episodes - Sarge (1973)
- Hong Kong Phooey - Rosemary (1974)
- Valley of the Dinosaurs - 16 episodes - Katie Butler (1974)
- Partridge Family 2200 AD - Laurie Partridge (1974–1975) (uncredited)
- Maude - Writer - episode: Arthur's Worry (1976)
