= Alain Berger =

Alain Berger may refer to:

- Alain Berger (orienteer)
- Alain Berger (ice hockey)

== See also ==
- Alan Berger, American landscape architect and urban designer
