= Valley of the Dinosaurs =

American animated television series

- Genre: Adventure; Action; Drama; Science fiction
- Directed by: Charles A. Nichols
- Voices of: Melanie Baker; Shannon Farnon; Joan Gardner; Kathy Gori; Jackie Earle Haley; Alan Oppenheimer; Mike Road; Frank Welker
- Narrated by: Don Messick
- Composer: Hoyt Curtin
- Country of origin: United States
- Original language: English
- No. of episodes: 16

Production
- Executive producers: William Hanna; Joseph Barbera
- Running time: 30 minutes
- Production company: Hanna-Barbera Productions

Original release
- Network: CBS
- Release: September 7 – December 21, 1974

Valley of the Dinosaurs is an American animated television series produced by the Australian studios of Hanna-Barbera Productions and broadcast on CBS from September 7 to December 21, 1974, and in syndication from 1977 to 1983. The series, about a contemporary family sucked by a vortex back to the Stone Age was intended to be educational as well as entertaining, demonstrating the early human uses of fire, clothing, weapons and cooking. It debuted on the same day as Land of the Lost.

== Plot ==
Science professor John Butler and his family – wife Kim, wisecracking teenage daughter Katie, young son Greg, and dog Digger – are on a rafting trip along the Amazon River in an uncharted river canyon when their raft hits a rock and capsizes. They are swept through a cavern and caught in a whirlpool.

Upon resurfacing, they find themselves in a mysterious realm where humans coexist with various prehistoric creatures, including dinosaurs. The Butlers meet and befriend a clan of Neanderthal cavepeople led by Gorok, his wife Gara, their teenage son Lok, and their young daughter Tana. Gorok and his family have a pet of their own in the form of a baby Stegosaurus named Glump. Gorok's family saved the Butlers' upon their first arrival.

Gorok's family aid the Butlers' efforts to find a means of returning home. For their own part, John and his family do what they can to make the Neanderthals' daily lives easier. Examples of such included introducing Gorok's family to basic technology, such as simple machines (particularly the lever and the wheel), sailboats and windmills.

== Episode list ==
No.	Title	Original release date
1	"Forbidden Fruit"	September 7, 1974
2	"What Goes Up"	September 14, 1974
3	"A Turned Turtle"	September 21, 1974
4	"The Volcano"	September 28, 1974
5	"Smoke Screen"	October 5, 1974
6	"Pteranodon"	October 12, 1974
7	"The Saber-Tooth Kids"	October 19, 1974
8	"After Shock"	October 26, 1974
9	"Top Cave, Please"	November 2, 1974
10	"S.O.S."	November 9, 1974
11	"Fire"	November 16, 1974
12	"Rain of Meteors"	November 23, 1974
13	"To Fly a Kite"	November 30, 1974
14	"Test Flight"	December 7, 1974
15	"The Big Toothache"	December 14, 1974
16	"Torch"	December 21, 1974

== Cast ==
- Frank Welker - Glump, Digger, Lok
- Melanie Baker - Tana
- Shannon Farnon - Kim Butler
- Joan Gardner - Gara
- Kathy Gori - Katie Butler
- Jackie Earle Haley - Greg Butler
- Don Messick - Narrator
- Alan Oppenheimer - Gorok
- Andrew Parks -
- Mike Road - John Butler

== Comics ==
Charlton Comics published 11 issues of a comic book series based on the TV cartoon featuring new stories from April 1975 until December 1976. Harvey Comics published a one-shot reprint of the comics in 1993.

== Home media ==
On March 22, 2011, Warner Archive released Valley of the Dinosaurs: The Complete Series on DVD in region 1 as part of their Hanna-Barbera Classic Collection. This is a Manufacture-on-Demand (MOD) release, available exclusively through Warner's online store and Amazon.com.

== Popular culture ==
- Characters from the show appeared in the Harvey Birdman, Attorney at Law episode "Beyond the Valley of the Dinosaurs" with Gorok voiced by Chris Edgerly and Tana voiced by Mary Birdsong.
- Glump has a cameo in Jellystone! episode "Ice Ice Baby" voiced by Fajir Al-Kasai. He appears as Top Cat's therapy patient. The cave family appeared in season three as Captain Caveman's cousins.
