= John Freeman (animator) =

American character animator (1916–2010)

- Born: John H. Freeman; December 14, 1916; Spokane, Washington, U.S.
- Died: January 1, 2010 (aged 93); Burbank, California, U.S.
- Occupation: Animator

John H. Freeman (December 14, 1916 – January 1, 2010) was a character animator for Disney, Marvel Studios, and others. He was born in Spokane, Washington.

== Career ==
Freeman worked as an animator for Disney for a total of 16 years beginning at the age of 22. He also worked with Marvel Studios and directed several After School Specials for ABC. As an animator, story director, and often the animator director, he worked on projects such as Fantasia, Lady and the Tramp, Peter Pan, My Little Pony 'n Friends, G.I. Joe, Transformers, and more.

Born December 14, 1916, in Spokane, Washington, and died January 1, 2010, in Burbank, California, where he resided with his wife, Lois Cameron Freeman, who survives him as well as three daughters, Catherine, Melissa and Marci. Mr. Freeman also has two grandsons, Jason and Casey.

He received a Character Animator credit on Lady and the Tramp in 1955.

Received a Golden Award in 1992 from the Motion Picture Screen Cartoonists Animation Guild.

Also won an award from CBS for his direction of the series, Hot Wheels, for Best Saturday Morning Animation show.

John Freeman began his animation career at Walt Disney Productions when he was 22 years old. He had been honing his skills as a cartoonist and in preparation for his interview at the studio, he made his own "reel," a demonstration of his artistic ability. He was hired within twenty minutes.

After a brief stint in the army (drafted) he returned to work at the Disney studio, where he began as an inbetweener on Fantasia and worked at Disney's for sixteen years, animating on features such as Peter Pan, Lady and the Tramp, and also animated some Disney 'shorts'.

He was a "story man" and often was the point or front person for promoting various Disney projects. For example, some of his drawings and other artwork for Lady and the Tramp were published in the Chevrolet Friends magazine in 1955.

John also innovated the amphitheater-style of seating while teaching life drawing at Disney's wherein the artists could view and sketch the model from various vantage points.

John went on to work at TV Spots in San Francisco in 1956, where he immediately went to work laying out, animating, and completing camera-ready finished drawings for four one-minute spots within one week on six hours sleep, and met the deadline for all four agencies. "Everybody was happy as hell. Those people up there thought I was Paul Bunyan or something."

His animation, direction, and/or writing ability shone in some notable TV specials such as It's the Great Pumpkin, Charlie Brown, Clerow Wilson and the Miracle of P.S. 14, The Incredible, Indelible, Magical Physical, Mystery Trip, Dr. Seuss on the Loose, The Bear Who Slept Through Christmas and The Hoober-Bloob Highway. While at the Disney studio, he worked with Bing Crosby and Orson Welles on production at Marvel Studios.

Numerous other projects include Transformers, The Flintstones, and several afternoon specials for television.

In 1981, John Freeman was also asked to travel to Madrid, Spain, to animate on Katy the Caterpillar at the Moro Creativos Asociados Studio.

Other studios where he lent his talents were: Hanna-Barbera Productions, Marvel Productions (Studios), Ruby-Spears, Ed Graham, Pantomime, and DePatie-Freleng Enterprises. - See more at: http://www.legacy.com/obituaries/latimes/obituary.aspx?n=john-h-freeman&pid=138309453#sthash.IUdGoert.dpuf

== Death ==
Freeman died in Burbank, California on January 1, 2010, at the age of 93.

== TV specials ==
- It's the Great Pumpkin, Charlie Brown (1966)
- Clerow Wilson and the Miracle of P.S. 14 (1972)
- The Incredible, Indelible, Magical Physical, Mystery Trip (1973)
- Dr. Seuss on the Loose (1973)
- The Bear Who Slept Through Christmas (1973)
- The Hoober-Bloob Highway (1975)

== TV series ==
- Bailey's Comets (1973–1975)
- The Oddball Couple (1975)
