= Bailey's Comets =

Television series

- Genre: Animated
- Created by: David H. DePatie; Friz Freleng; Joe Ruby; Ken Spears
- Written by: Dalton Sandifer; John W. Dunn; Larz Bourne
- Voices of: Jim Begg; Daws Butler; Carl Esser; Kathy Gori; Bob Holt; Sarah Kennedy; Don Messick; Karen Smith; Frank Welker
- Theme music composer: Doug Goodwin
- Opening theme: "Bailey's Comets Theme" by Every Thing Under the Sun
- Ending theme: "Bailey's Comets Theme" (instrumental)
- Composer: Doug Goodwin
- Country of origin: United States
- Original language: English
- No. of seasons: 1
- No. of episodes: 32 (16 half-hours)

Production
- Executive producers: David H. DePatie; Friz Freleng
- Producers: Joe Ruby; Ken Spears
- Editors: Rick Steward (editing supervisor); Joe Siracusa; Jim Blodgett; Allan Potter
- Production company: DePatie–Freleng Enterprises

Original release
- Network: CBS
- Release: September 8, 1973 – April 13, 1974

Bailey's Comets is an American animated cartoon series that aired on CBS. The second season consisted entirely of reruns. The series was produced by DePatie–Freleng Enterprises and was created by David H. DePatie and Friz Freleng in association with Joe Ruby and Ken Spears. Like some DePatie–Freleng shows like The Houndcats, The Pink Panther, and The Barkleys, this show contained an adult laugh track.

== Plot ==
Different roller skating teams compete in a worldwide race to different locations searching for clues that will lead them to a million-dollar prize at the end of the race. Besides the teams interfering with each other, there were also outside forces and subplots that would step in to hinder the teams' progress.

== Characters ==
=== Bailey's Comets ===
The protagonists and the team presented as most likely to win the million-dollar prize were a group of teenagers called Bailey's Comets. This team consisted of:

- Barnaby Bailey (voiced by Carl Esser) is the handsome and youthful leader of the team. He is the one who generally calls the shots and has to (reluctantly) take the most risks.
- Candy (voiced by Karen Smith) is a pretty blonde-haired girl. She is presumably Barnaby's girlfriend as she is the one who pushes him to take risks when necessary.
- Sarge (voiced by Kathy Gori in a Brooklyn accent) is a red-haired girl who was the team motivator.
- Wheelie (voiced by Jim Begg) is the team mechanic who comes up with strange roller skate-based inventions.
- Bunny (voiced by Sarah Kennedy) is a sweet-natured yet very ditzy girl.
- Pudge (voiced by Frank Welker) is good-natured but prone to trouble. He was on the hefty side, yet had almost no difficulty keeping up with the rest of the team. Pudge was especially fond of bananas, prompting Wheelie to refer to him as "Banana Brain" whenever Pudge made a mistake.

=== Other teams ===
Bailey's Comets were constantly being hindered by the other skating teams who also interfere with one another. The following are the teams that compete against Bailey's Comets:

- The Texas Black Hats are a group of outlaw cowboys that rode on roller skate-wearing horses. They are led by an unnamed outlaw (voiced by Daws Butler).
- The Jekyll-Hydes are a group of top hat-wearing English doctors that would turn into hideous green-skinned creatures at the most inopportune times that are led by Henry (voiced by Don Messick). Their "Jekyll" forms resembled Roland from the Roland and Ratfink theatrical shorts.
- The Ramblin' Rivets are a team consisting of a professor (voiced by Daws Butler) and his robots named Scrappy, Boltsbucket, and Fenderbender. The robots each contained all sorts of mechanical contraptions to help their team advance in the race.
- The Duster Busters are a motorcycle gang led by an unnamed leader (voiced by Frank Welker). They skated in half-sitting positions as if they were mounted on motorcycles.
- The Roller Coasters are a circus-based team consisting of a ringmaster (voiced by Don Messick), Hercules the Strongman, Big Bertha the Fat Lady, a lion on roller-skates, a circus clown that rides on the lion, and an Indian Rubber Man.
- The Stone Rollers are a team consisting of three roller-skating cavemen (all voiced by Bob Holt) and their roller-skating dinosaur (vocal effects provided by Don Messick).
- The Cosmic Rays are a team consisting of four aliens inside a skating flying saucer.
- The Gargantuan Giants are literally, a giant football team, so huge that only their skates would be seen onscreen. They were led by a normal-sized coach (voiced by Don Messick) who rode on the skates of one of the other members of his team.
- The Rockin' Rollers are a rock band.
- The Broomer Girls are a team of witches on roller skate-equipped brooms that are led by Auntie Hag. They also had a snickering roller-skating cat on their team.
- The Roller Bears are a team of five roller-skating bears which consist of four bears and one bear cub. They were the most hapless of the teams as they are constantly blundering and always laughing like idiots no matter how badly things got.
- The Mystery Mob are a team of skaters that are constantly immersed in a huge cloud of dust with flailing arms and legs. Despite being a skate team, no one knows what they look like.
- The Yo Ho-Ho's are a team of pirates led by a William Bligh-type pirate captain (voiced by Daws Butler). They use a roller skate-equipped raft. One pirate named Grog (voiced by Frank Welker) rows, the second pirate serves as the mast by holding a sail, and the third pirate rides in a roller skate-equipped barrel attached to the raft.
- The Hairy Mountain Red Eyes are a family of hillbillies. Pa (voiced by Don Messick) is the leader and rode in a roller skate-equipped wash bucket, Ma carried a hoe, and there were two boys consisting of Cornball and an unnamed boy who carried a pig.

=== Commentators ===
There were also two commentators named Gabby (voiced by Frank Welker impersonating Howard Cosell) and Dooter Roo (voiced by Daws Butler) keeping constant track of the proceedings from a helicopter. Very rarely, however, did they ever get involved in the actual goings-on of the race.

== Cast ==
- Jim Begg as Wheelie
- Daws Butler as Dooter Roo, Pirate Captain, Professor, Texas Black Hats Leader
- Carl Esser as Barnaby Bailey
- Kathy Gori as Sarge
- Bob Holt as Dude, Stone Rollers
- Sarah Kennedy as Bunny
- Don Messick as Henry, Gargantuan Giants' Coach, Ringmaster, Stone Rollers' Dinosaur, Pa Redeye
- Karen Smith as Candy
- Frank Welker as Pudge, Gabby, Duster Busters Leader, Grog

== Episodes ==
No.	Title	Original release date
1	"Skateroo to the Carlsbad Clue"	September 8, 1973
The skating teams race to Carlsbad Caverns. Auntie Hag of the Broomer Girls gives a hillbilly girl a love potion to make any boy skater that she catches fall in love with her. The clue is seen by all of the teams.
2	"To Win or Toulouse"	September 15, 1973
The skating teams race to Paris, France, where Bailey's Comets gets mixed up with a smuggler named Pierre who had smuggled a diamond into one of the bananas that came into Pudge's possession. The Ramblin' Rivets, the Duster Busters and the Yo Ho-Ho's plan to take advantage of this by making sure that Bailey's Comets does not catch Pierre. Afterwards, the clue is found by Bailey's Comets.
3	"Raja and Out"	September 22, 1973
The skating teams travel to the palace of the Raja of Punjab, India, who holds the next clue. The Raja then has the skaters compete to rescue his daughter from an evil fakir in order to get the next clue. The clue is found by the Broomer Girls.
4	"Ghost of a Clue"	September 29, 1973
The skating teams are in London in a race to Nottingham Castle. When Bailey's Comets end up in another castle, they come across the Ghost of Sir Tremblelot whose family coat of arms was stolen, which ends up intensifying the search when the other teams get involved. The clue is found by Bailey's Comets.
5	"Heading Home"	October 6, 1973
6	"Roman Race Run"	October 13, 1973
7	"Transylvania Mad Transit"	October 20, 1973
The skating teams race through Transylvania to get to Frankenstein's castle. Auntie Hag of the Broomer Girls casts a thunderstorm spell that causes Bailey's Comets and the Jekyll-Hydes to stumble upon Dr. Dracula's castle where he plans to make both teams act like the other. The clue is found by Bailey's Comets.
8	"Philippine Flip-Flop"	October 27, 1973
The skating teams are in the Philippines, where Bailey's Comets stumble into a valley where Pudge unknowingly saves a tribe of natives from a giant lizard and the natives want Pudge to deal with a giant gorilla. The Yo Ho-Ho's, the Ramblin' Rivets, and the Hairy Mountain Red Eyes plan to make sure that Bailey's Comets never leave the valley. The clue is found by Bailey's Comets.
9	"Space Race"	November 3, 1973
10	"Slow 'n' Go to Tokyo"	November 10, 1973
11	"Loch Ness Mess"	November 17, 1973
The skating teams are in Scotland, where the clue is in the Loch which ends up getting the Loch Ness Monster involved and Bailey's Comets is ordered by a police officer to get it back to Loch Ness in two hours or they will go to jail. The Texas Black Hats, the Jekyll-Hydes, and the Ramblin' Rivets plan to take advantage of this by planning to keep the Loch Ness Monster from going back into Loch Ness. Although Bailey's Comets find the clue, the rest of the skating teams manage to see it from a distance.
12	"Deep Blue Clue"	November 24, 1973
13	"South American Slip-Up"	December 1, 1973
14	"Gold Fever Goof-Up"	December 8, 1973
The skating teams are in Mexico, heading to the Mayan ruins to find the next clue. Auntie Hag of the Broomer Girls casts a gold fever spell on Pudge that causes him to get mixed up with some prospectors. The clue is found by Bailey's Comets.
15	"A Kooky Clue and a Mummy, Too"	December 15, 1973
16	"Kenya Catch That Clue"	December 22, 1973
17	"An Abominable Clue"	December 29, 1973
18	"Madagascar Mix-Up"	January 5, 1974
19	"Bear Blunder Down Under"	January 12, 1974
20	"Trans-Turkey Foul-Up"	January 19, 1974
The skating teams race through Turkey to the Istanbul Museum. Bailey's Comets encounter Bad Luck Ali Booboo and bring him along in a plan to change his bad luck streak. During the race, Ali Booboo's bad luck causes problems for Bailey's Comets and the other skating teams. The clue is found by Bailey's Comets.
21	"Amazon Jungle Bungle"	January 26, 1974
The skating teams are in the jungles of Brazil, where they are racing towards Sugarloaf Mountain. When Wheelie falls into the Amazon River following the Jekyll-Hydes shrinking the bridge, he is saved by an Amazon Jungle Woman named Magogo, who does not want Wheelie to go. Things get worse when Magogo's old boyfriend Bruto shows up to dispose of Wheelie. The clue is found by the Rockin' Rollers.
22	"Swiss Swap Switch"	February 2, 1974
23	"Hawaii Five Uh-Oh"	February 9, 1974
24	"Heidelberg Robot Hang-Up"	February 16, 1974
25	"Netherlands Bubble Trouble"	February 23, 1974
26	"Too Strong for Hong Kong"	March 2, 1974
27	"A Doggone Danish Clue"	March 9, 1974
28	"Hungarian Cluelosh"	March 16, 1974
29	"Gobi Desert Goof-Up"	March 23, 1974
30	"Sargasso Sea You Later"	March 30, 1974
31	"Fast Lap in Lapland"	April 6, 1974
32	"What's Buzzin', Canadian Cousin?"	April 13, 1974

== Production credits ==
- Created for Television: David H. DePatie, Friz Freleng
- In Association with Ken Spears, Joe Ruby
- Writers: Dalton Sandifer, John W. Dunn, Larz Bourne
- Animation Directors: Bob McKimson, Sid Marcus
- Storyboard Directors: Arthur Leonardi, Cullen Houghtaling
- Layout Supervision and Design: Cullen Houghtaling
- Layouts: Martin Studler, Owen Fitzgerald, Bob Givens, Glenn Schmitz, Ric Gonzales, Dick Ung
- Animation: Don Williams, Bill Carney, Ken Muse, Norm McCabe, Bob Richardson, Bill Ackerman, John Gibbs, Ken Walker, Bob Matz, John Freeman, Reuben Timmins, Bob Kirk, Bob Bemiller
- Background Supervised by Richard H. Thomas, Mary O'Loughlin
- Ink and Paint Supervisor: Gertrude Timmins
- Xerography: Paul B. Strickland
- Film Editing Supervised by Rick Steward
- Film Editors: Joe Siracusa, Jim Blodgett, Allan R. Potter
- Voice Talents of: Don Messick, Bob Holt, Sarah Kennedy, Daws Butler, Carl Esser, Kathy Gori, Karen Smith, Jim Begg, Frank Welker
- Title Design by Arthur Leonardi
- Music by Doug Goodwin
- Music Score Conducted by Eric Rogers
- Title Song Sung by "Every Thing Under the Sun"
- In Charge of Production: Lee Gunther
- Camera: Ray Lee, Larry Hogan, John Burton Jr.
- Production Mixer: Steve Orr
- Sound by Producers' Sound Service, Inc.
- Associate Producers: Joe Ruby, Ken Spears
- Produced by David H. DePatie, Friz Freleng
