= Hong Kong Phooey =

American animated television series

- Genre: Comedy
- Created by: William Hanna; Joseph Barbera
- Directed by: Charles A. Nichols
- Voices of: Scatman Crothers; Kathy Gori; Don Messick; Joe E. Ross
- Theme music composer: Hoyt Curtin
- Opening theme: "Hong Kong Phooey" by Scatman Crothers
- Ending theme: Hong Kong Phooey (Instrumental)
- Composer: Hoyt Curtin
- Country of origin: United States
- Original language: English
- No. of seasons: 1
- No. of episodes: 16 (31 segments)

Production
- Executive producers: William Hanna; Joseph Barbera
- Producer: Iwao Takamoto (creative producer)
- Running time: 30 minutes
- Production company: Hanna-Barbera Productions

Original release
- Network: ABC
- Release: September 7 – December 21, 1974

Hong Kong Phooey is an American Saturday morning animated television series produced by Hanna-Barbera Productions and originally broadcast on ABC. The original episodes aired from September 7 to December 21, 1974, and then in repeats until 1976. The show was brought back in reruns in 1978 and 1981, and was included in the USA Network's Cartoon Express block throughout the 1980s. The main character, Hong Kong Phooey, is the clownishly clumsy secret identity of Penrod "Penry" Pooch, an anthropomorphic dog working at a police station as a "mild-mannered" janitor under the glare of Sergeant Flint, nicknamed "Sarge".

Penry disguises himself as Hong Kong Phooey by jumping into a filing cabinet – in so doing he always gets stuck, and is freed by his striped pet cat named Spot – and once disguised, gets equipped with the "Phooeymobile" vehicle that transforms itself into a boat, a plane or a telephone booth, depending on the circumstances.

In fighting crime, he relies on his copy of The Hong Kong Book of Kung Fu, a correspondence-course martial-arts instruction handbook. However, his successes are only either thanks to Spot, who provides a solution to the challenges, or the direct result of a comically unintended side effect of his efforts. The humor of the incompetence of Hong Kong Phooey is a recurring theme of each episode. The backgrounds were designed by Lorraine Andrina and Richard Khim.

== Plot ==
Each episode begins with Rosemary, the somewhat ditzy telephone operator, getting a call about a crime which she explains to Sergeant Flint. Penry, the janitor, overhears the conversation and proceeds to transform himself into the crime-fighting canine (on whom Rosemary has a crush) by slipping into the hidden room behind the vending machine, then jumping into the bottom drawer of his filing cabinet, getting stuck, and, with help from Spot, coming out of the top drawer. Sometimes Spot is annoyed by Hong Kong Phooey for his bumbling but always ends up saving him.

After sliding behind an ironing board to the floor below, he bounces off an old sofa, through an open window, into a dumpster outside, and emerges driving his Phooeymobile. Even when he crashes into, harms, or otherwise inconveniences a civilian, the passer-by feels honored, as opposed to being annoyed or embarrassed, when they see who did it. One example was when he drove the Phooeymobile through wet cement, splattering the workers: they responded that it was an "honor to have a whole day's work ruined by the great Hong Kong Phooey". Despite his blatant lack of talent or intelligence, Hong Kong Phooey is feared by criminals and admired by citizens, but annoys Sergeant Flint, who sees him only as a hindrance to the police, and as evidenced in the final episode "Comedy Cowboys", Flint takes pleasure in arresting the framed hero (though he is later exonerated). Sometimes Sergeant Flint does admire Hong Kong Phooey for helping them catch the bad guys and bringing them to justice.

== Voice cast ==
- Scatman Crothers as Hong Kong Phooey/Penrod "Penry" Pooch
- Kathy Gori as Rosemary
- Joe E. Ross as Sergeant Flint
- Don Messick as Spot, The Narrator, Additional Voices

=== Additional voices ===
- Daws Butler
- Richard Dawson
- Ron Feinberg
- Bob Holt
- Casey Kasem (in "TV or Not TV" and "Stop Horsing Around")
- Jay Lawrence
- Peter Leeds
- Paul Lynde
- Allan Melvin (in "Car Thieves" and "The Incredible Mr. Shrink")
- Alan Oppenheimer
- Robert Ridgely
- Fran Ryan
- Hal Smith (in "Iron Head The Robot")
- John Stephenson
- Jean Vander Pyl (in "The Giggler")
- Lee Vines
- Janet Waldo (in "Patty Cake, Patty Cake, Bakery Man")
- Lennie Weinrib (in "The Gumdrop Kid", "Batty Bank Mob", "The Penthouse Burglaries", "Great Movie Mystery", and "Mirror, Mirror on the Wall")
- Frank Welker (in "The Giggler" and "The Claw")
- Paul Winchell (in "The Incredible Mr. Shrink")

== Production ==
Originally, the show was meant to be a vehicle for Huckleberry Hound, playing the titular Hong Kong Phooey, until it was decided to make it more original.

Hong Kong Phooey is voiced by Scatman Crothers. Sergeant Flint is voiced by Joe E. Ross, who was best known as Officer Gunther Toody in the early 1960s television series Car 54, Where Are You? As Flint, Ross revived Toody's famous "Ooh! Ooh!" exclamation, which he had also used when playing mess sergeant Rupert Ritzik in The Phil Silvers Show.

The final episode, "Comedy Cowboys", was intended as a backdoor pilot for a new series. In this two-part episode, new characters Honcho, The Mystery Maverick, and the Posse Impossible appear and help to clear Hong Kong Phooey of a crime. The titular trio later appear in their own continuing segment, "Posse Impossible" on CB Bears. Like many animated series created by Hanna-Barbera in the 1970s, the show uses the limited Hanna-Barbera laugh track.

== Music ==
The show's opening theme, titled "Hong Kong Phooey", was written and composed by Hoyt Curtin, William Hanna, and Joseph Barbera, and sung by Crothers. For the end credits, a shortened instrumental version of the same song was used. A cover performed by Sublime is included on the 1995 tribute album Saturday Morning: Cartoons' Greatest Hits, produced by Ralph Sall for MCA Records.

== Episodes ==
No.	Title	Original release date
1	"Car Thieves" "Zoo Story"	September 7, 1974
"Car Thieves": A stolen car ring is operating in town, and it is up to Hong Kong Phooey to break through the ring's sneaky secrets and stop them in their fiendish tracks.; "Zoo Story": A kangaroo helps Phooey capture a gang of animal thieves.
2	"Iron Head the Robot" "Cotton Pickin' Pocket Picker"	September 14, 1974
"Iron Head the Robot": When a crook commands his robot to steal every safe in town, Hong Kong Phooey gives chase — resulting in a showdown in the crook's gym.; "Cotton Pickin' Pocket Picker": Phooey is sent to capture legendary pickpocket Fingers Fazoo.
3	"Grandma Goody (Cat Burglar)" "Candle Power"	September 21, 1974
"Grandma Goody (Cat Burglar)": This time cats are being stolen all over town, including Spot — and Grandma Goody is not what she seems, as Hong Kong Phooey finds out in a bubble-filled climax.; "Candle Power": Two villainous criminals force the city to use candles so that they can build their very own wax museum.
4	"The Penthouse Burglaries" "Batty Bank Mob"	September 28, 1974
"The Penthouse Burglaries": Phooey is called to investigate a number of robberies from penthouse apartments.; "Batty Bank Mob": Phooey enlists the help of Spot and a friendly octopus to stop a bank robbery.
5	"The Voltage Villain" "The Giggler"	October 5, 1974
"The Voltage Villain": Phooey is called to investigate a villain who can control electrical appliances.; "The Giggler": A crazed clown-like criminal uses laughing gas to rob the senses of the guests attending high-society parties of an important mayor and Phooey must defeat the deranged lunatic before everyone dies laughing.
6	"The Gumdrop Kid" "Professor Presto (The Malevolent Magician)"	October 12, 1974
"The Gumdrop Kid": Phooey investigates a child-sized villain's plans to take over the town's sweet production.; "Professor Presto (The Malevolent Magician)": Phooey is asked to track down a magician who disappeared from the police station.
7	"TV or Not TV" "Stop Horsing Around"	October 19, 1974
"TV or Not TV": Phooey attempts to sabotage plans by thieves to steal everyone's television sets.; "Stop Horsing Around": Phooey tracks down a circus gang that is kidnapping horses.
8	"Mirror, Mirror on the Wall" "Great Movie Mystery"	October 26, 1974
"Mirror, Mirror on the Wall": Phooey investigates a number of robberies in a health salon.; "Great Movie Mystery": Phooey is asked to participate in the filming of a bank robbery, unaware that it is real.
9	"The Claw" "Hong Kong Phooey vs. Hong Kong Phooey"	November 2, 1974
"The Claw": Phooey investigates how a mechanical claw is stealing gold from the National Bank.; "Hong Kong Phooey vs. Hong Kong Phooey": An impostor starts to claim all of Phooey's rewards for fighting crime.
10	"The Abominable Snowman" "Professor Crosshatch"	November 9, 1974
"The Abominable Snowman": Phooey tracks down a snowman who is stealing equipment for a luxury ski resort.; "Professor Crosshatch": Phooey is asked to capture an evil professor who has trained his pet bird to steal jewels from shop windows.
11	"Goldfisher" "Green Thumb"	November 16, 1974
"Goldfisher": A villainous gang plans to raise the cost of fishing by stealing its competitor's fish.; "Green Thumb": Phooey tracks down a gang who want to rid the entire city of plants.
12	"From Bad to Verse (Rotten Rhymer)" "Kong and the Counterfeiters"	November 23, 1974
"From Bad to Verse (Rotten Rhymer)": The villainous Rotten Rhymer plans to steal the nation's book collection.; "Kong and the Counterfeiters": Phooey is called to investigate a bogus money-making scheme.
13	"The Great Choo Choo Robbery" "Patty Cake, Patty Cake, Bakery Man"	November 30, 1974
"The Great Choo Choo Robbery": The villainous Jim Shady plans to steal every railroad car in the country.; "Patty Cake, Patty Cake, Bakery Man": Phooey investigates the mysterious theft of jewels by people hiding them in baker's food.
14	"Mr. Tornado" "The Little Crook Who Wasn't There"	December 7, 1974
"Mr. Tornado": Phooey tracks down a supervillain who robs banks by using his tornado-strength lung power.; "The Little Crook Who Wasn't There": Phooey is called to track down a criminal who can disappear without a trace.
15	"Dr. Disguiso" "The Incredible Mr. Shrink"	December 14, 1974
"Dr. Disguiso": A villainous master of disguise uses his skills for a number of bank robberies.; "The Incredible Mr. Shrink": An evil businessman terrorizes the town into buying his umbrellas.
16	"Comedy Cowboys"	December 21, 1974
Tin Nose, a conniving cowboy of crime, frames Hong Kong Phooey for the theft of a rare map to the Lost Dutchman Mine from a museum. It is up to Honcho, The Mystery Maverick, and the Posse Impossible to help corral Tin Nose and clear Phooey's name.

== Home media ==
On August 15, 2006, Warner Home Video released the complete series on 2-disc DVD in Region 1. The DVD set includes commentary on select episodes as well as a documentary of the show from its development through its legacy. The set also includes production designs, never-before-seen original artwork, new interviews, and the special feature Hong Kong Phooey—The Batty Bank Gang: The Complete Storyboard. The series is also available in the UK as a Region 2 two-disc set with the special features removed, and as two separate volumes in Region 4. The shorts "Car Thieves" and "Zoo Story" were also released on a 1970s Saturday morning cartoon compilation.

== Other media ==
With a copyright of 2001, Alan Lau, in conjunction with Wildbrain.com, produced a flash animation webshow cartoon that was prominently featured on CartoonNetwork.com, and could still be found there as of the middle of June 2015. While Penry appears identical to the original incarnation, Hong Kong Phooey is a much larger, cut, and highly competent and skilled fighter—even without Spot the cat. Hong Kong Phooey faces off against and easily defeats evil anthropomorphic animals: a trio of rabbits, what appears to be a crane, and a reptilianoid (that appears to be a Komodo dragon). At the end he morphs back to Penry with a smile and sparkle in his eye.

=== Film ===
- On July 12, 2009, it was announced that David A. Goodman had been hired to write the screenplay for a Hong Kong Phooey film to be released by Warner Bros. Pictures. Alex Zamm was slated to direct, and Broderick Johnson, Andrew Kosove, Brett Ratner, and Jay Stern were identified as producers. According to the announcement, Alcon Entertainment would back the film. It was announced on August 10, 2011, that Eddie Murphy would be voicing Penry/Hong Kong Phooey in the film. On December 28, 2012, test footage of the film was leaked, showing a computer-generated character in live-action scenery. As of January 2022 no further information has been revealed since, and the film has likely been canceled.
- Hong Kong Phooey briefly appears on the side of an arcade machine in the film Scoob! (2020).

=== TV series ===
- Hong Kong Phooey/Penrod "Penry" Pooch appears in the TV series Laff-A-Lympics, with Scatman Crothers reprising his role. He is a member of the "Scooby Doobies", which consists of characters from Hanna-Barbera's shows from the 1970s. Hong Kong Phooey was selected as a replacement for the title character from Jeannie, as legal issues with Columbia Pictures (who owned the rights to the I Dream of Jeannie characters through their television division) prevented the Jeannie characters from appearing in the show.
- Hong Kong Phooey made a cameo in the "Agent Penny" episode of the Super Secret Secret Squirrel segment of 2 Stupid Dogs.
- To date, Hong Kong Phooey has appeared in two segments on Robot Chicken:
  - "Enter the Fat One (Part 2)", in the episode "S&M Present", where he fights Joey Fatone in a karate tournament.
  - "Laff-A-Munich", in the episode "Ban on the Fun", in a segment that spoofs Laff-A-Lympics in the style of the 1972 Munich massacre and the film based on the massacre.
- Hong Kong Phooey made a cameo in the Duck Dodgers episode "K-9 Quarry". He was amongst the poached Hanna-Barbera characters on the Alien Hunter's ship.
- Hong Kong Phooey/Penrod "Penry" Pooch appears in the new Wacky Races episode "Hong Kong Screwy", voiced by Phil LaMarr. The racers encounter him in China and help him fight the forces of the evil organization K.I.T.T.Y. led by Golden Paw. This appearance reveals Hong Kong Phooey's origin, and he is presented as an actual martial-arts master and competent crime-fighter.
- In the 2003 episode of Malcolm in the Middle, "Future Malcolm", Malcolm helps a misanthropic man he played chess with in the park get an interview at the drug store where his mother works. In response to the question, "Why here?", Malcolm responds, "Because this is the only guy I know that would trade a job interview for a Hong Kong Phooey lunchbox."
- Hong Kong Phooey (voiced by Ron Funches), Sergeant Flint, Rosemary (voiced by Georgie Kidder) and Spot (voiced by Bernardo de Paula) appear in the Jellystone! season 3 episode "Collection Protection". In it, they are characters in an anime series. Hong Kong Phooey also appears in a later episode "Mummy Knows Best" which reveals he was a real-life movie star who starred in martial arts films in the 1980s.

=== Music ===
- The Bloodhound Gang song "Why's Everybody Always Pickin' on Me?" describes a person as looking "like Chewie, Baba Booey and Hong Kong Phooey all in one."
- The Moldy Peaches song "Nothing Came Out" mentions Hong Kong Phooey among other cartoons: "I want you to watch cartoons with me. He-Man, Voltron, and Hong Kong Phooey."
- The song "Sugarcane" by the Space Monkeys mentions the side-effect of drugs as being "Quicker than the human eye or Hong Kong Phooey."
- The song "Old School" by Danger Doom, features a few classic cartoon mentions. One of these is a mention of Phooey by rapper MF Doom in the line "Ooh Wee, like a Hong Kong Phooey Kick", reminiscing about his childhood.
- Rosemary appears as the Kong Studios receptionist when the Kong Studios game was revived by the English virtual band Gorillaz's website in September 2025.

=== Literature ===
The children's novella Hong Kong Phooey and the Fortune Cookie Caper by Jean Lewis, illustrated by Phil Ostapczuk, was published in 1975 by Rand McNally and Company, as well as Hong Kong Phooey and the Bird Nest Snatchers (1976) and Hong Kong Phooey and the Fire Engine Mystery (1977). Hong Kong Phooey's Hidden Pictures book by Tony Tallarico was published by Tempo Books in 1976.

=== Art ===
In January 2015, a street art ceramic mosaic of Hong Kong Phooey sold at a Sotheby's auction for HK$2 million. The copy sold was a re-creation by the artist Invader after the original was removed from a city wall by Hong Kong authorities.

=== Comics ===
Charlton Comics published seven issues of a Hong Kong Phooey comic book during the show's run. Much of the art was produced by Paul Fung Jr.

The character appeared in 2017 in Scooby-Doo Team-Up #51-52 digital comic (released in print as #26).

In 2018, a re-imagined version of Hong Kong Phooey appeared alongside Black Lightning in the DC comic book Black Lightning/Hong Kong Phooey Special #1.

=== Video games ===
A hireable NPC named "H K Phooey" can be found in the game Might and Magic II: Gates to Another World.

== See also ==
- List of works produced by Hanna-Barbera Productions
- List of Hanna-Barbera characters
