= Inch High, Private Eye =

- Genre: Comedy
- Written by: Fred S. Fox; David Harmon
- Directed by: Charles A. Nichols
- Voices of: Leonard Weinrib; Kathy Gori; Bob Luttrell; Don Messick; John Stephenson; Jean Vander Pyl
- Composer: Hoyt Curtin
- Country of origin: United States
- Original language: English
- No. of seasons: 1
- No. of episodes: 13

Production
- Executive producers: Joseph Barbera; William Hanna
- Producers: Iwao Takamoto; Alex Lovy
- Cinematography: Tom Barnes; Norman Stainback; George Epperson; Dennis Weaver
- Editors: Milt Krear; Clifford Kohlweck
- Running time: 30 minutes
- Production company: Hanna-Barbera Productions

Original release
- Network: NBC
- Release: September 8 – December 1, 1973

Inch High, Private Eye is an American animated television series produced by Hanna-Barbera Productions and broadcast on NBC from September 8 to December 1, 1973.

The character was modeled after Maxwell Smart, the main character of the 1965–1970 comedy Get Smart, and Lennie Weinrib's performance as Inch High is an imitation of Don Adams' character.

== Plot ==
The titular character of Inch High Private Eye is a miniature detective (literally one inch high), who attained his diminutive stature by way of a secret shrinking potion. Inch often enlists the help of his niece Lori (sometimes written "Laurie"), her muscle-bound sweetheart Gator, and their dog Braveheart to help solve mysteries. Their primary mode of transportation is the Hushmobile, a streamlined car that makes virtually no noise while being driven, making it perfect for following criminals unnoticed.

Inch works for The Finkerton Detective Agency (a wordplay lampoon of The Pinkerton Detective Agency), where the boss Mr. Finkerton constantly dreams of the day that he will fire him.

Unlike most Hanna-Barbera mystery solving cartoons, which feature teen sleuths, the characters in this show are all adults.

== Voice cast ==
- Leonard Weinrib – Inch High
- Kathy Gori – Lori
- Bob Luttrell – Gator
- Don Messick – Braveheart
- John Stephenson – Mr. Finkerton
- Jean Vander Pyl – Mrs. Finkerton

=== Additional voices ===
- Jamie Farr
- Ted Knight
- Alan Oppenheimer
- Vic Perrin
- Janet Waldo

== Episodes ==
No.	Title	Original release date
1	"Diamonds Are a Crook's Best Friend"	September 8, 1973
Mrs. Gotrocks is just opening her safe when a shadowy figure tries to grab her entire collection of diamonds. She is able to close the safe just in time to save them. She places a call to the Finkerton Detective Agency which in turns calls Inch High. He has Gator retrieve the electric hushmobile so they can begin protecting the jewels. When Mrs. Gotrocks shows Inch High the diamonds the lights go off and the jewels disappear. Inch High is now on an investigation to find the jewels before they disappear forever.
2	"You Oughta Be in Pictures"	September 15, 1973
Inch High goes after the villain who tries to steal the diamond necklace. Unfortunately he gets caught in a book and has to get through the courses to get into the real world again.
3	"The Smugglers"	September 22, 1973
The shipyard has become a magnet for criminals and thugs. The biggest problem is a group of smugglers using Zappos Imports as a cover for their operation. Inch High is able to grab one of the crates but discovers that it is empty. Inch High is told to go on vacation and stay away from the investigation but comes up with a clue and investigates anyway. What are the empty crates for and will Inch High be able to figure it out in time?
4	"Counterfeit Story"	September 29, 1973
The Last National Bank discovers that the money in their vault has all been replaced with counterfeit cash. It is the third bank in a week that has been hit by the counterfeiters. Inch High discovers that Mr. Midas is behind the crimes and sets out to catch him.
5	"The Mummy's Curse"	October 6, 1973
Inch High is on his way to Egypt to investigate reports of a mummy coming back to life and creating havoc.
6	"The Doll Maker"	October 13, 1973
Spumoni, the great doll-maker has made an army of dolls with which he plans on using to steal all of the fur coats in town. Inch High and his Finkerton Detective Agency pals only have 24 hours to stop him.
7	"Music Maestro"	October 20, 1973
The great conductor Marieso Manufique is about to perform his last concert before he retires. Inch High has noticed a pattern of crimes when compared to where the symphony has been performing. Inch High is running out of time to prove his case since Manufique plans to leave the country directly after his last show.
8	"Dude City"	October 27, 1973
While at a dude ranch, Inch High mixes in with a group of criminals and shuns his friends. When he discovers that they are criminals, he devises a plan to stop them and reunite with his old friends.
9	"High Fashion"	November 3, 1973
Inch High must devise a plan to stop a fashion designer intent on kidnapping his only competitor.
10	"The Cat Burglars"	November 10, 1973
Every famous work of art in the world is being stolen and the police are baffled. Inch High is ordered to guard a copy of the Pink Lady which is traveling on a train to Chicago. The real painting is traveling on a separate train to confuse the crooks.
11	"The World's Greatest Animals"	November 17, 1973
B.T. Farnham wants all of the world's greatest animals for his circus. Since none of them are for sale, he has his henchmen steal them for him. Can Inch High stop the crime spree and return the animals to their rightful owners?
12	"Super Flea"	November 24, 1973
A scientist invents a super detective in the form of a mechanical flea which threatens to take Inch High's job. The super flea is stolen and it is now up to Inch High to find him. If he does not, he will be fired; if he does, he will be replaced. Can Inch High find the missing flea and keep his job?
13	"The Return of Spumoni"	December 1, 1973
The evil Spumoni returns to town to get revenge on Inch High and his friends. He is, of course, the great doll-maker. He plans to steal a valuable "Pichelangelo" statue that is being guarded by the Pinkerton Agency.

== Other appearances ==
- Inch High appears in a Cartoon Network commercial, where he teams up with Batman to fight crime, only to be crushed when running to the Batmobile.
- Inch High was also featured in an episode of Harvey Birdman, Attorney at Law, in which he sues his Mr. Finkerton for wrongful dismissal as Mr. Finkerton claims that he is too short to be a P.I. Inch High was voiced by Maurice LaMarche while Mr. Finkerton was voiced by Chris Edgerly.
- Inch High appears in Jellystone! voiced by Fajer Al-Kaisi. In the episode "It's a Mad, Mad, Mad Rat Rat Race", Inch High was a patron of Morocco Mole's sauna-themed restaurant "Saunas, Sweat & Sandwiches" where he demanded that Lippy the Lion and Hardy Har Har turn down their only comedy album which he insulted as being bad. They throw him in their chest with the comedy album where they misplaced the chest when Morocco Mole called the police on them for causing a disturbance. When the chest is opened later upon being found by Yogi Bear, Boo-Boo Bear, Cindy Bear, Jabberjaw, Loopy De Loop, Augie Doggie, Shag Rugg, and Yakky Doodle, Inch High was found in the chest as Lippy and Hardy recall about the events. After Inch High asks for someone to call his family, Hardy Har Har shuts the chest on him. In "The Box Thief", Inch High was seen in the unboxing videos of Jabberjaw and Mayor Huckleberry Hound. When it comes to the latter's video, he put Inch High back in the box.
- Inch High makes a voice-only cameo in the Velma episode "Velma Makes a List".

== Home media ==
On April 24, 2012, Warner Archive released Inch High Private Eye: The Complete Series on DVD in region 1 as part of their Hanna-Barbera Classics Collection. This manufacture-on-demand (MOD) release was made available exclusively through Warner's online store and Amazon.com.
