= The Telephone Book =

1971 film

- Theatrical release poster
- Directed by: Nelson Lyon
- Written by: Nelson Lyon
- Produced by: Merv Bloch
- Starring: Sarah Kennedy; Norman Rose; James Harder; Jill Clayburgh
- Narrated by: Ondine
- Music by: Nate Sassover
- Distributed by: Rosebud Releasing Corporation (Avco Embassy Pictures)
- Release date: October 3, 1971
- Running time: 97 minutes
- Country: United States
- Language: English
- Budget: $500,000

The Telephone Book is a 1971 American independent sexploitation comedy film written and directed by Nelson Lyon and starring Sarah Kennedy, along with Norman Rose, James Harder, and Jill Clayburgh. The film follows a solitary but lustful woman named Alice, who falls in love with a stranger who makes obscene phone calls to her. The film is satirical in nature and often breaks the fourth wall.

The film was released in the United States in 1971, and received an X rating from the Motion Picture Association of America. It was met with mostly negative reviews, though critical reception to the film has become more positive decades after its initial release. It has been considered a cult film.

== Plot ==
Alice (Sarah Kennedy), a shy and lustful woman, lives in a New York City apartment that is wallpapered with pornographic images. She is filmed in various poses under the male gaze, and speaks in a sexy baby voice. She receives an obscene phone call from a stranger (Norman Rose), which fascinates her and sends her on a picaresque adventure through various situations in pursuit of the caller, all of them sexual in one way or another. Alice's scenes are interspersed with confessional footage of anonymous men who place obscene calls.

At last the caller is revealed, a man in a suit wearing a pig mask. He makes a confession, and Alice's infatuation for him does not wane. The film ends with a sudden change to color footage and a psychedelic, heavily sexualized and absurdist animated sequence.

== Cast ==
- Sarah Kennedy as Alice
- Norman Rose as John Smith
- James Harder as Obscene Caller
- Jill Clayburgh as Eyemask
- Ondine as Narrator
- Barry Morse as Har Poon
- Ultra Violet as Whip Woman
- Geri Miller as Dancer

== Release ==
An intermission was shot for the film, in which Andy Warhol simply eats popcorn for several minutes, until the audience returns to their seat. The intermission was cut from the film prior to release, and has since been lost.

The film was restored and released on DVD and Blu-ray on May 7, 2013, by Vinegar Syndrome.

== Critical reception ==
The Telephone Book received mostly negative reviews upon release. In a contemporary review written for The New York Times, critic A. H. Weiler called the film "an occasionally interesting, if wrong, number." Kevin Thomas of the Los Angeles Times, however, called the film "so bleakly brilliant that those in search of the usual sexploitation entertainment attend at peril". The Los Angeles Herald Examiner also published a positive review of the film.

Decades after its release, The Telephone Book has been reassessed as "a neglected masterpiece". Budd Wilkins of Slant Magazine gave the film a rating of 4 out of 5 stars, calling it "a brilliant and lamentably neglected gem of early-'70s underground filmmaking", and declaring the scene in which Alice meets John Smith to be "one of the great satirical set pieces in the history of American cinema." Katie Rife of The A.V. Club wrote that "dismissing Nelson Lyon's sole directorial outing as a nudie flick does it a major disservice, as it's a gleefully obscene, visually inventive piece of pop-counterculture satire that has more in common with Putney Swope than Deep Throat." Rob Hunter of Film School Rejects has referred to the film as a "true classic".

In 2015, Alison Nastasi of Flavorwire listed the film as being one of the 50 greatest midnight movies of all time.

Conversely, Brian Orndorf of Blu-ray.com gave the film a mostly negative review, calling it "as arousing as a tax audit and funny as jury duty", and "an insufferable grab bag of encounters and staring contests, missing its moon shot to become a triumphant cult experience, whiffing with its allegedly provocative elements."
