= Sarah Kennedy (actress) =

American actress (born 1948)

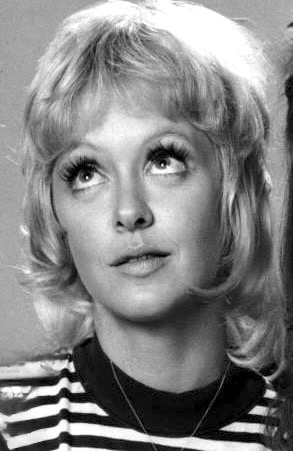
- Kennedy in 1972
- Born: January 27, 1948 (age 78); Coquille, Oregon, U.S.
- Other name: Sarah Kennedy Roth
- Occupation: Actress
- Years active: 1971–1981, 2004
- Height: 5 ft 2 in (1.57 m)
- Spouse(s): Edwin Morton Roth (1982–?; divorced)

Sarah Kennedy (born January 27, 1948) is an American actress who appeared in many popular television shows during the 1970s and early 1980s, including Rowan & Martin's Laugh-In. She was also an occasional guest on Match Game and The Tonight Show, and appeared in films such as The Telephone Book (1971) and The Working Girls (1974).

== Early life ==
Born and raised in Coquille, Oregon, where her father was a doctor, Kennedy knew she wanted to be an actress from age five. Kennedy graduated from Coquille High School where she was a cheerleader and travelled around the country as a cheerleader clinic instructor. She attended Oregon State University and San Francisco State University, majoring in English and dance, and her first job was as a receptionist at a talent agency in New York City, which led to many commercial and acting roles.

== Filmography ==
=== Film ===
Year	Title	Role	Notes	Ref.
1971	The Telephone Book	Alice	Comedy film written and directed by Nelson Lyon	
1974	The Working Girls	Honey	Exploitation film written and directed by Stephanie Rothman	
1976	Sammy Somebody		Crime and drama film directed by Joseph Adler	

=== Television ===
Year	Title	Role	Notes	Ref.
1972	O'Hara, U.S. Treasury	Miss Moscrip	Episode: "Operation: Mr. Felix" (S 1:Ep 20)	
1972	Banyon	Susie	Episode: "The Decent Thing to Do" (S 1:Ep 1–Pilot)	
1972–73	Rowan & Martin's Laugh-In	Various characters	Contract role: Last season	
1973	Love, American Style	Beebe	Episode: "Love and the Singing Suitor / Love and the Unmarriage / Love and the Wee He" (S 4:Ep 17)	
1973	Love, American Style		Episode: "Love and the Mind Reader / Love and the Mr. and Mrs. / Love and the Soap Opera" (S 4:Ep 22)	
1973	Bachelor-at-Law	Ellen Brandon	Made-for-TV-Movie directed by Jay Sandrich	
1973	Love, American Style	Mimi Holloway	Episode: "Love and the Comedienne / Love and the Lie / Love and the Lifter / Love and the Suspicious Husband" (S 5:Ep 2)	
1973	Bob & Carol & Ted & Alice	Beryl	Episode: "Open Marriage/Closed Mind" (S 1:Ep 5)	
1973–74	Emergency +4	Sally and Carol Harper	Contract role: 2 seasons in production and 1 in rerun	
1973–75	Bailey's Comets	Bunny	Contract role: Second season consisted entirely of reruns	
1974	Dirty Sally		Episode: "All That Glitters" (S 1:Ep 7)	
1974	ABC Afterschool Special	Little Red (voice)	Episode: "The Magical Mystery Trip Through Little Red's Head" (S 2:Ep 6)	
1975	The Oddball Couple	voice	Contract role	
1977	Future Cop	Marge	Episode: "Girl on the Ledge" (S 1:Ep 3)	
1979	Barnaby Jones	Cleo da Vinci	Episode: "The Medium" (S 7:Ep 13)	
1980	Willow B: Women in Prison	Sabrina Reynolds	Pilot	
1980	Nobody's Perfect	Marlene	Episode: "Hart in Jail" (S 1:Ep 8)	
1981	Laverne & Shirley		Episode: "Born Too Late" (S 6:Ep 9)	
1981	Barney Miller	Spec. Alice Grant	Episode: "Games" (S 8:Ep 6)	

=== Stage ===
Year	Title	Role	Notes	Ref.
2004	Seascape	Nancy	Two-act play by American playwright Edward Albee performed at the Thunder River Theatre Company, Carbondale, Colorado	
