= The Oddball Couple =

1975 American animated television series

- Genre: Comedy; Animated sitcom
- Based on: The Odd Couple by Neil Simon
- Directed by: Gerry Chiniquy; Robert McKimson
- Voices of: Frank Nelson (Spiffy); Paul Winchell (Fleabag); Joan Gerber (Goldie); Joe Besser; Bob Holt; Sarah Kennedy; Don Messick; Ginny Tyler; Frank Welker
- Theme music composer: Doug Goodwin, arranged by Joe Siracusa
- Composer: Doug Goodwin
- Country of origin: United States
- No. of seasons: 1
- No. of episodes: 16 (32 segments)

Production
- Producers: David H. DePatie; Friz Freleng
- Editors: Bob Gillis (editing supervisor); Allan Potter; Joe Siracusa; Rick Steward
- Running time: 20 minutes (2 10-minute segments)
- Production company: DePatie-Freleng Enterprises

Original release
- Network: ABC
- Release: September 6 – December 20, 1975

The Oddball Couple is an American animated sitcom that aired on ABC on Saturday mornings for 16 episodes from September 6 to December 20, 1975. The show was produced by DePatie-Freleng Enterprises, and was distributed by Viacom Enterprises. It is an adaptation of the television sitcom The Odd Couple, which had ended its run that year, after five seasons on ABC.

== Plot ==
The Oddball Couple features the misadventures of a dog named Fleabag and cat named Spiffy, who live together under the same roof. Spiffy is an orderly and polite cat who is a stickler for cleanliness and organization, and Fleabag is rude, obnoxious, lazy, untidy and very disorganized. Their disparate personalities are reflected in their house – which is one-half mansion and one-half dilapidated shack – and even in their car, which is half-pristine and half-junker. They have a secretary named Goldie Hound (a play on the name Goldie Hawn) who works in the office they share. The show consists of two segments lasting 10 minutes each.

In the original Odd Couple series, Felix the neat freak was a photographer and slovenly Oscar was a sportswriter. In this series, Spiffy the neatnik is a writer and Fleabag the slob is a photographer.

== Cast ==
- Joe Besser
- Joan Gerber as Goldie
- Bob Holt
- Sarah Kennedy
- Don Messick
- Frank Nelson as Spiffy
- Ginny Tyler
- Frank Welker
- Paul Winchell as Fleabag

== Episodes ==
No.	Title	Original release date
1	"Spiffy's Man Friday" "Who's Zoo"	September 6, 1975
2	"A Day at the Beach" "Fleabag's Mother"	September 13, 1975
3	"Spiffy's Nephew" "To Heir Is Human"	September 20, 1975
4	"A Royal Mixup" "Paper Airplane"	September 27, 1975
5	"The Bighouse and Garden" "The Talking Plant"	October 4, 1975
6	"Family Album" "Hotel Boo-More"	October 11, 1975
7	"Irish Luck" "Who's Afraid of Virginia Werewolf?"	October 18, 1975
8	"Dive Dummers" "Do or Diet"	October 25, 1975
9	"Klondike Oil Kaper" "Old Bugeyes Is Back"	November 1, 1975
10	"Mugsy Bagel" "TV or Not TV"	November 8, 1975
11	"Ali Cat" "The Joker's Wild"	November 15, 1975
12	"Cinderbag" "Momma Fleabag"	November 22, 1975
13	"Do It Yourself, Fleabag" "Roman Daze"	November 29, 1975
14	"Fleabag's Submarine" "Foreign Legion"	December 6, 1975
15	"Bats in the Belfry" "Superhound"	December 13, 1975
16	"Jungle Bungle" "Talent Scouts"	December 20, 1975

== Production credits ==
- Story Editor: Bob Ogle
- Writers: Bob Ogle, Joel Kane, David Detiege, Earl Kress, John W. Dunn
- Supervising Director: Lew Marshall
- Animation Directors: Gerry Chiniquy, Robert McKimson
- Storyboard Directors: Bill Perez, Art Leonardi, Jan Green, Gary Hoffman
- Graphic Design: Ric Gonzales, Gary Hoffman, Dick Ung, Al Wilson, Ken Landau, Coral Kerr, Adam Szwejkowski, Susan Scholefield
- Animation: Norm McCabe, Bob Matz, Virgil Ross, Bob Bemiller, Bob Richardson, Jim Davis, Nelson Shin, Bill Numes, Don Williams, Joel Seibel, Bob Bransford, John Freeman, Bill Carney, Warren Batchelder, George Jorgensen, John Gibbs, Bob Goe
- Background Supervised by: Richard H. Thomas
- Backgrounds: Mary O'Loughlin, Don Watson
- Ink and Paint Supervisor: Gertrude Timmins
- Xerography: Greg Marshall
- Film Editors Supervised by: Bob Gillis
- Film Editors: Joe Siracusa, Rick Steward, Allan Potter
- Voices: Paul Winchell, Frank Nelson, Joan Gerber, Frank Welker, Sarah Kennedy, Don Messick, Joe Besser, Ginny Tyler, Bob Holt
- Music by: Doug Goodwin
- Main Title Music Arranged by: Joe Siracusa
- Conducted by: Eric Rodgers
- In Charge of Production: Lee Gunther
- Camera: Ray Lee, Larry Hogan, John Burton Jr.
- Production Mixer: Steve Orr
- Sound by: Producer's Sound Service, Inc.
- This picture has made the jurdisction of I.A.T.S.E., affiliated with A.F.L.-C.L.O.
- © MCMLXXV DePatie-Freleng Productions, Inc. All rights reserved.
- Based Upon the Play "The Odd Couple" by Neil Simon
- Produced by: David H. DePatie & Friz Freleng
- DFE Films · A DePatie-Freleng Production

== Home media ==
This series was released on DVD from CBS via Amazon's CreateSpace on December 30, 2017.
