= Floundering =

- Theatrical release poster
- Directed by: Peter McCarthy
- Written by: Peter McCarthy
- Produced by: Peter McCarthy
- Starring: James LeGros; John Cusack; Ethan Hawke; Steve Buscemi; Lisa Zane; Kim Wayans; Billy Bob Thornton
- Cinematography: Denis Maloney
- Edited by: Dody Dorn; Peter McCarthy
- Music by: Pray for Rain
- Production company: Front Films
- Distributed by: Strand Releasing
- Release dates: January 1994 (Sundance); November 4, 1994 (limited)
- Running time: 96 minutes
- Country: United States
- Language: English

Floundering is a 1994 comedy film set in the aftermath of the Los Angeles riots of 1992. The film was directed and written by Peter McCarthy in his directorial debut and stars James LeGros, with appearances by John Cusack, Ethan Hawke, and Lisa Zane. The film is told as a narrative delivered by the main character John under the pessimism of the early 1990s.

== Plot ==
In the wake of the Los Angeles riots, John Boyz is an unemployed, aimless young man who lives alone in Venice. Things start to go awry for him when the IRS freezes his bank account and his unemployment benefits run out. John must also deal with his unfaithful girlfriend and his drug-addicted brother Jimmy who needs $3,000 for a detox program.

John deals with his personal issues through a series of disjointed and sometimes imaginary encounters with television personalities, dead relatives, a former liberal turned investment banker, drug users and the unemployment office. Each chapter bears a varying degree of social commentary. The film climaxes as John loses hope, and his search for meaning turns to self-destruction. John is finally rescued by the charity of an old friend, then resolving to leave Los Angeles and start his life anew.

== Cast ==
- James LeGros as John Boyz
- Lisa Zane as Jessica
- Ethan Hawke as Jimmy
- Nelson Lyon as Chief Merryl Fence
- Maritza Rivera as Elle
- Kim Wayans as Unemployment Clerk
- Olivia Barash as Ruthie
- Nina Siemaszko as Gal
- John Cusack as J.C.
- Steve Buscemi as Ned
- Billy Bob Thornton as Gun Clerk
- Dave Navarro as Drug Kid
- Viggo Mortensen as Homeless Man

== Production ==
The film is the directorial debut of Peter McCarthy, who had been a producer on American New Wave films like Repo Man and Sid and Nancy. It was shot on Super 16 and was scored by Pray for Rain.

== Release ==
The film premiered at the 1994 Sundance Film Festival. It also played at the Berlin International Film Festival and the Stockholm International Film Festival. It was given a limited theatrical release in the United States on November 4, 1994.

=== Critical reception ===
On Rotten Tomatoes, Floundering has an approval rating of 67% based on 12 reviews.

Leonard Klady of Variety wrote, "While the disjointed tale of contemporary alienation doesn’t always connect the dots, it has a raw energy and sense of fun that’s infectious. The film also provides actor James Le Gros with a tour-de-force opportunity as the non-hero of the piece. It’s a rigorous obstacle course of emotion and incident anchored by a performance of unerring integrity." Klady noted that while the subject matter is "extremely depressing stuff", "writer/first-time director Peter McCarthy is more interested in allegory than cinema verite. Boyz’s situation is an amalgam of youthful travail and he is, initially, more observer than participant in this modern 'Pilgrim’s Progress.' That distance, combined with the colorful, if dehumanized, members of civilization he encounters, is absurd and blackly comic."

In a positive review, Peter Stack of the San Francisco Chronicle said, "Decidedly offbeat, and at times so awkward you cringe, 'The Floundering'...is nonetheless a slyly engaging, sardonic comedy." Peter Rainer of the Los Angeles Times was more critical, writing "Peter McCarthy, the producer-writer-director of this micro-budgeted swatch of anomie is...trying here for some of the same funky, desultory poetry, along with a healthy dollop of Social Consciousness. He doesn’t quite have the skills for the job."
