= Nelson Lyon =

American actor, director and screenwriter

- Born: February 28, 1939; Troy Hills, New Jersey, U.S.
- Died: July 17, 2012 (aged 73); Los Angeles, California, U.S.
- Education: Columbia University
- Occupations: Screenwriter; actor; film director; photographer
- Years active: 1971–2005
- Children: 2

Nelson Lyon (February 28, 1939 – July 17, 2012) was an American writer, actor, photographer and film director, known for his directorial debut The Telephone Book (1971). He started working in advertising and later as a writer for Saturday Night Live during the early 1980s. He attended Columbia University. In the 1960s he was an active member of the counterculture movement and was friendly with several key figures, like Andy Warhol and William Burroughs.

In 1983 he became known as the last man to see John Belushi alive. He took part in the three-day binge that killed Belushi and later testified against Cathy Evelyn Smith before a grand jury in exchange for immunity from prosecution. According to his account, on March 2, 1982, Belushi showed up at his home with Smith, who injected him and Belushi with what appeared to be cocaine. The next few days were a bit of a haze, going from Lyon's home to a private club on Sunset Strip and finally to Belushi's bungalow at the Chateau Marmont. There Smith continued giving the two men injections. Lyon said he left the bungalow on March 5 at around 3:30 a.m., Smith staying behind with Belushi. Belushi was found dead there later that day.

After Belushi's death, Lyon's character was stained by his association with the case and he struggled to find work. According to Mark Mothersbaugh, a close friend, "in his later years he was dependent on the largess of his friends." He died of liver cancer on July 17, 2012.

== Filmography ==
=== Film ===
Year	Title	Credit	Notes
1971	The Telephone Book	Director, screenwriter	film debut
1977	The Baron	Screenwriter	
1988	Spike of Bensonhurst	Co-Producer	alternative title: Mafia Kid
1994	Floundering	Chief Merryl Fence	
1996	Baja	Nelson	(final film role)
2005	Phobias	Shane Free	

=== Television ===
Year	Title	Role	Notes
1981–1982	Saturday Night Live	Writer	20 episodes
