= Alan Berger =

American landscape architect

Alan Berger is an American landscape architect and urban designer currently the Leventhal Professor of Advanced Urbanism at Massachusetts Institute of Technology and an Elected Fellow of the American Academy in Rome.
