= Jellystone! =

American animated comedy streaming television series

- Genre: Comedy; Slapstick; Slice of life; Animated sitcom
- Based on: Original works and characters created by Hanna-Barbera
- Developed by: C. H. Greenblatt
- Voices of: Fajer Al-Kaisi; Jeff Bergman; Jim Conroy; Bernardo de Paula; Andrew Frankel; Jakari Fraser; Ron Funches; Carl Greenblatt; Katie Grober; Grace Helbig; Georgie Kidder; Thomas Lennon; Jenny Lorenzo; Ulka Simone Mohanty; Lesley Nicol; Angelique Perrin; Oscar Reyez; Dana Snyder; Niccole Thurman; Paul F. Tompkins; George Lowe; Andy Merrill
- Theme music composer: Ego Plum
- Composer: Ego Plum
- Country of origin: United States
- Original language: English
- No. of seasons: 3
- No. of episodes: 77 (list of episodes)

Production
- Executive producers: C. H. Greenblatt; Sam Register
- Producer: Adam Middleton
- Editor: Brant Duncan
- Running time: 11 minutes 22 minutes ("Meet the Jetsons", "Snowdodio" and "Crisis on Infinite Mirths")
- Production company: Warner Bros. Animation

Original release
- Network: HBO Max, Cartoon Network, Boomerang
- Release: July 29, 2021 – March 6, 2025

Jellystone! is an American animated comedy television series developed by C. H. Greenblatt for the streaming service HBO Max. Produced by Warner Bros. Animation, the show features and centers around oddly reimagined versions of various characters by Hanna-Barbera, who live together in the fictional town of Jellystone. The show premiered on July 29, 2021, and ended on March 6, 2025, after three seasons consisting of 77 episodes.

Having been a fan of Hanna-Barbera content, Greenblatt began developing on the series according to him in January 2020, with Unikitty! director Careen Ingle and former Harvey Beaks writer and storyboard artist Hannah Ayoubi. During production, he and his crew decided to have every single character exist in a single town together, changing some of their core traits to make them more likeable while adapting to modern audiences, instead of recreating their past adventures. Jellystone! is the first series to feature many of Hanna-Barbera's trademark characters (such as Yogi Bear and Huckleberry Hound) since Yo Yogi! (1991), as well as the first production since the closure of the Hanna-Barbera studios, and also the first television series featuring them without the respective studios' founders, William Hanna and Joseph Barbera, who died in 2001 and 2006, respectively.

Each episode is 11 minutes long, aside from season 3 containing three 22-minute specials. The first season consisted of 21 episodes, with most episodes combined in pairs, though was produced as separate 11-minute episodes, including the Halloween episode "Spell Book" which was released on its own. The second season was released on March 17, 2022 with 19 episodes. On March 2, 2022, it was announced that it was renewed for a third season of 40 episodes, though it was eventually cut down to 37 episodes to make room for the 22-minute specials. There is also a 22-minute special that features Cartoon Network characters called "Crisis on Infinite Mirths" and it also serves as the series finale in the production order. The first half of season three was released on Max on February 22, 2024. The second half of season 3 was released on March 6, 2025.

== Overview ==
The series is a reimagined take on the Hanna-Barbera brand, focusing on a modernized ensemble of its characters as they live, work, and play together but have to solve the problems they have.

All of them have specific roles in the community. Huckleberry Hound is the Mayor of Jellystone, Yogi Bear is a surgeon, Cindy Bear is a genius inventor, Doggie Daddy is a lighthouse keeper who is overprotective towards his daughter Augie Doggie, Jabberjaw and Loopy De Loop work in Grape Ape & Magilla Gorilla's haberdashery called "Magilla's", Top Cat and the Hoagy's Alley cats continue with their scam activities, El Kabong doubles as a teacher and superhero, Shazzan is a ticket seller at Jellystone Theatre and does various vendor jobs, and The Banana Splits are cartoonish criminals.

The episode "Sweet Dreams" claims that Jellystone is nestled between Lake Jellystone (no longer an ecological disaster since 2019) and New Bedrock according to Mayor Huckleberry Hound's story to Augie Doggie in the style of a tourism commercial. In addition, Mayor Huckleberry Hound's description for Jellystone has him advising any visitors to ignore the sign that says "Do not enter by order of the government".

Season three reveals that New Bedrock is a rival town of Jellystone that is run by Mayor Dick Dastardly and Muttley and has The Really Rottens as notable citizens.

=== Intro gags ===
During the opening sequence, a gag will occur during the citizens' marching that will knock down some buildings like dominoes and cause everyone to run. The following gags have occurred:

- The spaceship of Bleep from Josie and the Pussycats in Outer Space crashing into a building (seen in episodes 1, 5, 9, 13b, 14a, 17b, and 18a).
- Mildew Wolf tripping over a fire hydrant causing a torrent of water to hit a building as he runs (seen in episodes 2, 6, 10, 14b, 15a, 18b and 19a).
- Grape Ape accidentally knocking down a building (seen in episodes 3, 7, 11b, 12a, 15b, 16a, 19b and 20a).
- Speed Buggy accidentally backing into a building before driving off (seen in episodes 4, 8, 11a, 12b, 13a, 16b, 17a and 20b).
- Undercover Elephant, Snooper and Blabber, and Inch High, Private Eye look for a clue, but Inch High stops as Snooper and Blabber bump into him and Undercover Elephant bumps into them enough to accidentally knock down a building (seen in episodes 21, 23a, 23b, 29a, 29b).
- Tubb tries to eat a hotdog, but accidentally knocks down a building as he starts to run (seen in episodes 22a, 22b, 26a, 26b).
- Dick Dastardly and Muttley knock down a building (seen in episodes 24a, 24b, 27a, 27b).
- Space Ghost's Phantom Cruiser crashing into a building as Space Ghost turns invisible (seen in episodes 25a, 25b, 28a, 28b).

== Characters ==
In contrast with previous Hanna-Barbera media, some of the established male characters are now female in the series for the sake of gender balance; these include Augie Doggie, Jabberjaw, half of Top Cat's gang, Snooper, Squiddly Diddly, and Loopy De Loop.

== Episodes ==
Season	Episodes	Originally released		
Season	Episodes	First released	Last released	Network
1	21	July 29, 2021	October 21, 2021	HBO Max
2	19	March 17, 2022		HBO Max
3	37	February 22, 2024	March 6, 2025	Max

== Production ==
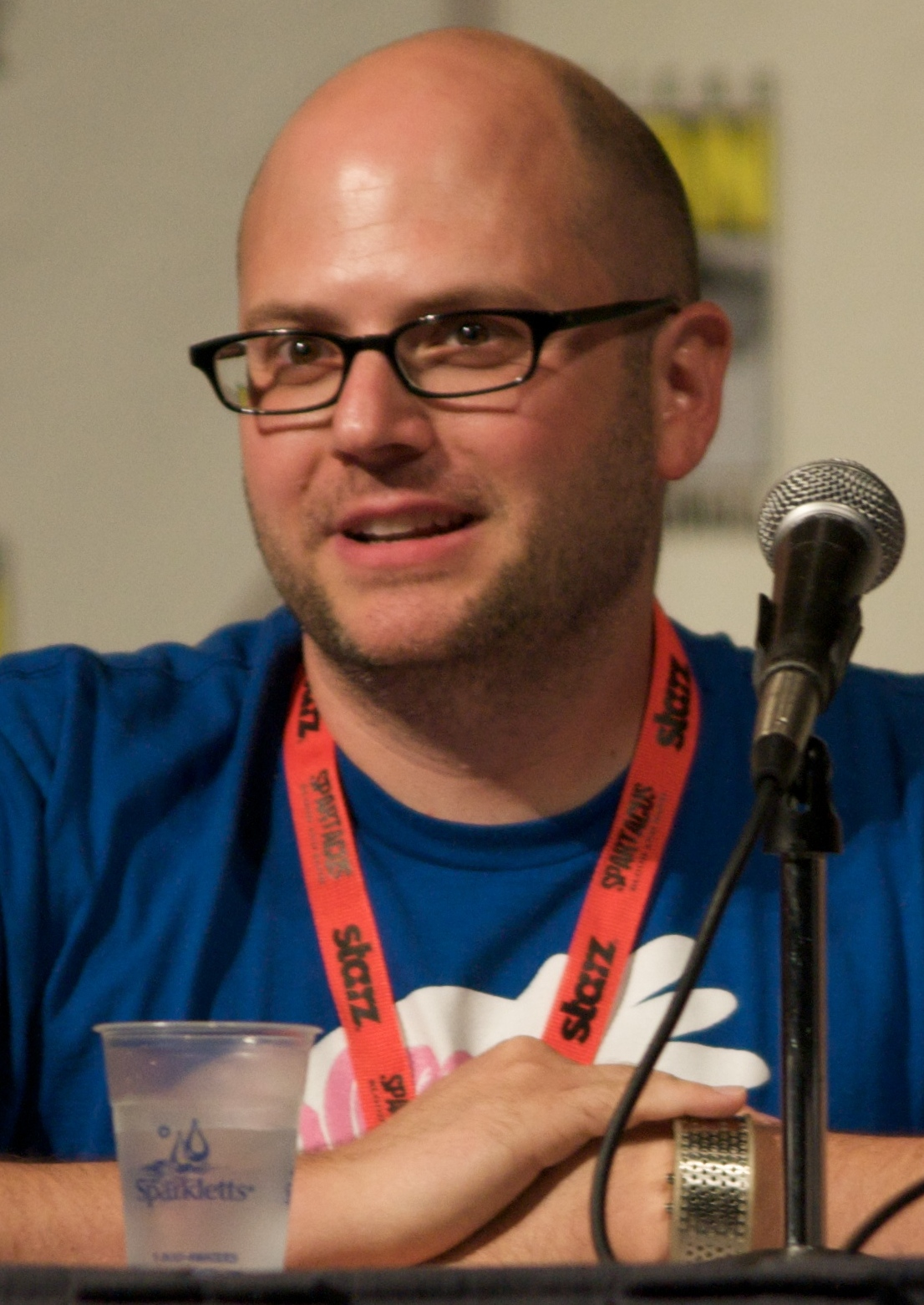
C. H. Greenblatt came up with the idea of rebooting Hanna-Barbera's legacy into a newly founded city where anything can happen.

Production on the series according to Greenblatt began in January 2020, with Unikitty! director Careen Ingle and former Harvey Beaks writer and storyboard artist Hannah Ayoubi. According to Greenblatt's Tumblr, this show has been in early development for at least a year and a half. Greenblatt serves as executive producer alongside Hi Hi Puffy AmiYumi and The Looney Tunes Show creator and Warner Bros. Animation, Cartoon Network Studios, and Hanna-Barbera Studios Europe president Sam Register.

Greenblatt was a fan of Hanna-Barbera content as a child, and gained a deep respect for the brand from there, believing that its expansive array of characters is what really made it work. While working on the series, he and his crew decided to have every single character exist in a single town together, changing some of their core traits to make them more likeable while adapting to modern audiences, instead of recreating their past adventures. They also managed to weave in the action-based characters, such as Jonny Quest and Shazzan, whereas many of the obscure ones, ranging from the Biskitts to Yankee Doodle Pigeon, were reduced to cameos.

In a July interview with Animation Magazine during the series development, Greenblatt stated that they had just outsourced to their animation departments and that the show could debut in 2021.

Jeff Bergman said that he was voicing Yogi Bear amongst others for the series.

Concept art for the series.

The show's HBO Max premiere, July 29, 2021, was announced, as well as the rest of the voice cast.

Unlike Greenblatt's other two shows, which utilized traditional hand-drawn animation, Jellystone! was animated with Adobe Animate by Cheeky Little Media in New South Wales, Australia and Snipple Animation in Quezon City, the Philippines. Ben Gruber, who co-created Superjail! for Adult Swim, is the show's story editor.

Greenblatt called the series a "love letter" in an interview with Greg Ehrbar on Jerry Beck's animationscoop.com but "not a nostalgia show", though he had filled the episodes with classic cameos. He did not see the series as a replacement for the original shows and characters, but hoped that the entire Hanna-Barbera library might someday become available easily. Greenblatt also compared the overall vibe of the show to season five of The Simpsons, the point where that series transitioned from a domestic sitcom to a wacky ensemble cast-based show.

Greenblatt has stated that the series took heavy inspiration from places outside of Hanna-Barbera, such as Walter Lantz Productions' Hickory, Dickory inspiring Pixie and Dixie's portrayals in the HBO Max animated series, Blue Sky Studios' Ice Age film franchise's Sid, and various other inspirations.

== Release ==
Jellystone! premiered in the United States on July 29, 2021, on HBO Max.

It premiered later in 2021 in other countries:

In Canada, the series premiered on October 10 on Teletoon, as well as being shown for American broadcast on Cartoon Network on September 4. The series became available to purchase on Digital storefronts such as iTunes and Vudu the day after. The series premiered in the United Kingdom on Cartoon Network on November 1. In Brazil and Latin America, the series premiered on December 10, on Cartoon Network and HBO Max.
