= The Flintstone Primetime Specials =

- Also known as: The Flintstone Special
- Directed by: Carl Urbano; Oscar Dufau; Ray Patterson
- Voices of: Henry Corden; Mel Blanc; Jean Vander Pyl; Gay Autterson; John Stephenson
- Music by: Hoyt Curtin
- Country of origin: United States
- Original language: English
- No. of episodes: 4

Production
- Executive producers: William Hanna; Joseph Barbera
- Producer: Alex Lovy
- Running time: 30 minutes
- Production company: Hanna-Barbera Productions

Original release
- Network: NBC
- Release: September 26, 1980 – October 11, 1981

The Flintstone Primetime Specials (onscreen title: The Flintstone Special) is a four-episode limited-run prime time television revival of The Flintstones produced by Hanna-Barbera Productions which aired on NBC from September 26, 1980 to October 11, 1981.

== List of animated specials ==
No.	Title	Directed by	Original release date
1	"The Flintstones' New Neighbors"	Carl Urbano	September 26, 1980
The Flintstones and the Rubbles welcome a new strange family, The Frankenstones, to their Bedrock neighborhood.
2	"The Flintstones: Fred's Final Fling"	Oscar Dufau and Ray Patterson	November 7, 1980
Fred believes he only has 24 hours to live (due to a mix-up at the doctor's office with his X-rays) and tries to enjoy life as much as possible.
3	"The Flintstones: Wind-Up Wilma"	Carl Urbano	October 4, 1981
Wilma is a celebrity when she gets a shot at the big leagues and becomes a pitcher for the Bedrock Dodgers.
4	"The Flintstones: Jogging Fever"	Ray Patterson	October 11, 1981
After failing his annual physical, Fred enters the Rockstone Marathon to prove to everyone, including his boss Mr. Slate, that he is in shape.

== Voice cast ==
- Henry Corden - Fred Flintstone
- Mel Blanc - Barney Rubble, Dino
- Jean Vander Pyl - Wilma Flintstone, Pebbles Flintstone
- Gay Autterson - Betty Rubble
- Don Messick - Bamm-Bamm Rubble
- John Stephenson - Frank Frankenstone, Mr. Slate
- Pat Parris - Oblivia Frankenstone
- Jim MacGeorge - Stubby Frankenstone
- Julie McWhirter - Hidea Frankenstone

== Production ==
The Flintstones' New Neighbors and Jogging Fever were animated at Filman, an animation studio in Madrid, Spain (headed by Carlos Alfonso and Juan Pina) who did a lot of animation work for Hanna-Barbera between the early 1970s through the mid-1980s. Among their credits were such series as Yogi's Space Race, Buford and the Galloping Ghost, The Little Rascals, Paw Paws, The Smurfs and The Jetsons (1980s revival) as well as the specials The Harlem Globetrotters Meet Snow White and Yogi's First Christmas. This would explain why, artistically, the backgrounds in some of these specials look very much like pencil and charcoal drawings, very different from the original series and its spin-offs.

All specials utilized an inferior laugh track created by the studio, the last production to do so.

== Home media ==
On October 9, 2012, Warner Archive released all four specials on DVD in region 1 as part of their Hanna-Barbera Classic Collection in a release entitled The Flintstones Prime-Time Specials Collection: Volume 2.
