= The Frankenstones =

Fictional cartoon family

- The Flintstones family
- First appearance: "Fred & Barney Meet the Frankenstones (1979)"; The New Fred and Barney Show
- Last appearance: "House Wars"; The Flintstone Comedy Show
- Created by: Hanna-Barbera

The Frankenstones are a family of fictional characters who appeared on The Flintstones spin-offs and television specials through the early 1980s. The family has been described as a sort of fusion of The Flintstones and The Munsters. The Frankenstones are also similar in scope to The Gruesomes, another monster-themed family that moved next door to the Flintstones during the fifth season of the original series.

== The New Fred and Barney Show ==
The first version of the Frankenstones were introduced on September 15, 1979, in the episode "Fred & Barney Meet the Frankenstones" of the second season of The New Fred and Barney Show. They were featured as the managers of a condorstonium development called Deadrock Arms that Fred Flintstone and Barney Rubble considered moving their families into. This Frankenstone family consisted of:

- Frank Frankenstone, a Frankenstein Monster-style father (voiced by John Stephenson)
- Hidea Frankenstone, his wife (voiced by Gay Autterson)
- Atrocia Frankenstone, their giggly teenage daughter (voiced by Jean Vander Pyl)
- Freaky Frankenstone, their son (voiced by Jim MacGeorge)

Frank's voice was patterned after Boris Karloff by voice actor John Stephenson, and Hidea had a pseudo-Transylvanian accent.

== The Flintstones prime-time specials ==
A Frankenstone monster (voiced by Ted Cassidy) was featured in the 1979 Halloween special The Flintstones Meet Rockula and Frankenstone. This version of Frankenstone was Count Rockula's unfinished creation, awoken prematurely when lightning strikes the machinery in Rockula's laboratory.

The second version of the Frankenstones moved in next door to the Flintstones in The Flintstones' New Neighbors as part of a limited run prime-time revival of The Flintstones, which aired on NBC in 1980–1981. This time, the family consisted of:

- Frank Frankenstone (voiced by John Stephenson)
- Oblivia Frankenstone, his wife (voiced by Patricia Parris)
- Hidea Frankenstone, their daughter who resembles the original Atrocia (voiced by Julie McWhirter)
- Stubby Frankenstone, their son who closely resembles Freaky (voiced by Jim MacGeorge)

The family is odd once again, and a friendship developed between the Flintstones and the Frankenstones. Frank's voice was still patterned after Boris Karloff by John Stephenson. This version of the Frankenstones continued to appear throughout the run of the prime-time specials: Fred's Final Fling (1980), Wind-Up Wilma (1981) and Jogging Fever (1981).

== The Flintstone Comedy Show ==
The Frankenstones starred in their own eponymous segment on Saturday mornings as part of The Flintstone Comedy Show which premiered on November 22, 1980. This third and final version of the Frankenstone family more closely resembled the version previously seen in The New Fred and Barney Show than the Frankenstones that just moved in next door in the prime-time specials. This version of the family consisted of:

- Frank Frankenstone (voiced by Charles Nelson Reilly)
- Hidea Frankenstone, his wife and previously their daughter's name in the prime-time specials (voiced by Ruta Lee)
- Atrocia Frankenstone, their kooky daughter who is now the youngest child (voiced by Zelda Rubinstein)
- Freaky Frankenstone, their son who is now a teenager (voiced by Paul Reubens)
- Rockjaw, their pet monster who devoured anything in his path (voiced by Frank Welker)

The previously soft-natured Frank is now hot-tempered and wired with his voice provided by Charles Nelson Reilly in his traditional high-pitched, hyper-whiny style. Frank became volatile without hesitation, especially when he dealt with his annoying neighbor and rival Fred Flintstone. Frank and Fred were both frustrated by the friendships between their wives (Hidea and Wilma) and children (Freaky and Pebbles), and they always seemed to be thrust into one mess after another because of each other.

Cartoon historian Hal Erickson says that "The Frankenstones was the best of the new components, and a refreshing break from the usual 'friendly monster who thinks everyone else is abnormal' formula...[Frank Frankenstone] carried on a hilariously snotty feud with neighbor Fred Flintstone. The lines given to Frank and his goodnatured wife Hidea were some of the sharpest and funniest heard on any of the Flintstones incarnation. The verbal humor was evenly matched by the grotesquely imaginative visual design of the Frankenstone home, which carried its own rain cloud and was overrun with utterly indescribable stone-age monstrosities of all shapes and colors...The Frankenstones sequences more than made up for the rest of the show with a generous supply of laughs."

The Flintstone Comedy Show ran for two seasons and consecutively with two more Flintstone prime-time specials in 1981 (which both revert to John Stephenson's version of Frank with his wife Oblivia, and children Hidea and Stubby). The continuity of the prime-time Flintstones and Saturday morning Flintstones drift further apart because both have their own version of Frankenstone neighbors.

Following the cancellation of The Flintstone Comedy Show in 1982, the Frankenstones have never been referred to in any subsequent spin-off series, specials or animated movies.

The Frankenstones segment was later rerun as part of the package show The Flintstone Funnies (1982–1984).

== Appearances in other media ==
- Frank Frankenstone makes a cameo appearance as an enemy character at the haunted dungeon stage in the 1991 video game The Flintstones: The Rescue of Dino & Hoppy.
- Frank Frankenstone appears in two different comic books: The Flintstone Kids #10 (published in 1989 by Star Comics) and The Flintstones #1 (published in 1995 by Archie Comics).
