= The Flintstones' New Neighbors =

- Directed by: Carl Urbano
- Voices of: Henry Corden; Mel Blanc; Jean Vander Pyl; Gay Autterson; John Stephenson; Pat Parris; Frank Welker
- Country of origin: United States
- Original language: English

Production
- Executive producers: William Hanna; Joseph Barbera
- Producer: Alex Lovy
- Running time: 30 minutes
- Production company: Hanna-Barbera Productions

Original release
- Network: NBC
- Release: September 26, 1980

Related
- The Flintstones Meet Rockula and Frankenstone; Fred's Final Fling

The Flintstones' New Neighbors is a 1980 animated television special and the first of The Flintstone Special limited-run prime time revival of The Flintstones produced by Hanna-Barbera Productions. The special premiered on NBC on September 26, 1980.

The Flintstones' New Neighbors was animated at Filman, an animation studio in Madrid, Spain (headed by Carlos Alfonso and Juan Pina) who did a lot of animation work for Hanna-Barbera between the early 1970s through the mid-1980s. This would explain why, artistically, the backgrounds in this special look very much like pencil and charcoal drawings, very different from the original series and its spin-offs.

Like many animated series created by Hanna-Barbera in the 1970s, the show contained a laugh track created by the studio, one of the last productions to do so.

== Summary ==
The Flintstones and the Rubbles welcome a new strange family, The Frankenstones, to their Bedrock neighborhood.

== The Frankenstones ==
The Frankenstone family featured on this special was a different version of the Frankenstones from the episode "Fred & Barney Meet the Frankenstones" of The New Fred and Barney Show (1979).

The new Frankenstone family members are:

- Frank Frankenstone
- Oblivia Frankenstone, his wife
- Hidea Frankenstone, their daughter
- Stubby Frankenstone, their son

A friendship develops between the Flintstones and the Frankenstones, not unlike the rivalry that would be depicted later between Fred and Frank on The Flintstone Comedy Show. This version of the Frankenstones continued to appear throughout the run of the specials.

== Voice cast ==
- Henry Corden as Fred Flintstone
- Mel Blanc as Barney Rubble
- Jean Vander Pyl as Wilma Flintstone, Pebbles Flintstone
- Gay Autterson as Betty Rubble
- Don Messick as Bamm-Bamm Rubble
- John Stephenson as Frank Frankenstone
- Patricia Parris as Oblivia Frankenstone
- Jim MacGeorge as Stubby Frankenstone
- Julie McWhirter as Hidea Frankenstone
- Frank Welker as Creepy, Mother Pterodactyl

== Award nomination ==
The Flintstones' New Neighbors was nominated for Outstanding Individual Achievement - Animated Programming at the 33rd Primetime Emmy Awards in 1981.

== Home media ==
The Flintstones' New Neighbors was included as a bonus episode on the 1989 VHS release of The Flintstones Meet Rockula and Frankenstone.

On October 9, 2012, Warner Archive released The Flintstones' New Neighbors on DVD in region 1 as part of their Hanna–Barbera Classics Collection, in a release entitled The Flintstones Prime-Time Specials Collection: Volume 2. It was a Manufacture-on-Demand release, available exclusively through Warner's online store and Amazon.com.
