= The New Fred and Barney Show =

American animated television series

- Genre: Comedy
- Created by: William Hanna; Joseph Barbera
- Written by: Douglas Booth; Andy Heyward; Len Janson; Glenn Leopold; Chuck Menville; Bob Ogle; Ray Parker; Dave Stone; James Yaras
- Directed by: Ray Patterson; Oscar Dufau; George Gordon
- Voices of: Henry Corden; Mel Blanc; Jean Vander Pyl; Gay Autterson
- Theme music composer: Hoyt Curtin
- Country of origin: United States
- Original language: English
- No. of seasons: 2
- No. of episodes: 17

Production
- Executive producers: William Hanna; Joseph Barbera
- Producer: Art Scott
- Running time: 30 minutes
- Production company: Hanna-Barbera Productions

Original release
- Network: NBC
- Release: February 3 – October 20, 1979

The New Fred and Barney Show is an American animated television series revival and spin-off of The Flintstones produced by Hanna-Barbera that aired on NBC from February 3 to October 20, 1979. The series marked the first time Henry Corden performed the voice of Fred Flintstone for a regular series.

The series was released by Warner Archive on Blu-ray on January 27, 2026.

== Overview ==
These new episodes were composed of the traditional Flintstones cast of characters such as Fred and Barney's children Pebbles and Bamm-Bamm as toddlers, after having been depicted as teenagers on The Pebbles and Bamm-Bamm Show on CBS in 1971. They returned to the form of teenagers on The Flintstone Comedy Show in 1980 on NBC. Some plots were familiar Flintstones stories while others consisted of new misadventures with witches and werewolves, as well as spoofs of late 1970s fads.

A second season of seven new episodes combined with reruns of The New Fred and Barney Show were broadcast on the package program Fred and Barney Meet the Thing and later on Fred and Barney Meet the Shmoo.

Like many animated series created by Hanna-Barbera in the 1970s, the show contained a laugh track.

== Episodes ==
=== Season 1 ===
No. overall	No. in season	Title	Original release date
1	1	"Sand-Witch"	February 3, 1979
Fred and Barney end up with a broken wheel in the middle of a haunted forest while on their way to a bowling alley, and find the nearest house possible to call for help, unaware that the kindly old lady living there is a man-eating witch.
2	2	"Haunted Inheritance"	February 10, 1979
Fred learns that he is the beneficiary of the fortune of an aristocrat to whom he was kind when he was disguised as a quarry worker, but tension arises when he discovers that he is not the only one and that the winner of the beneficiary competition gets it all.
3	3	"Roughin' It"	February 17, 1979
Fred believes that "modern" technology is making life too easy and boring, and attempts to live life like an "old-fashioned" caveman, even though he is out of practice.
4	4	"C.B. Buddies"	February 24, 1979
Fred and Barney each purchase a new C. B. system which enables them to talk to each other from their cars, but trouble appears when they power them up too much.
5	5	"Bedrock Rocks"	March 3, 1979
Two members of a famous rock band, the Cavemen, come to Bedrock for a concert tour. After overhearing Mr. Slate's desire to have his wife see them for her birthday, Fred tries to fix the Cavemen up with the Slates. When this fails, he and Barney try their hand at impersonating them.
6	6	"Blood Brothers"	March 10, 1979
Fred and Barney save a couple from a car accident who turn out to be the reformed vampire Count Rockula and his new wife "Poopsie". Though Fred and Barney are still terrified of him, Rockula places himself in their debt and does his best to befriend them and make them his "blood brothers".
7	7	"Barney's Chickens"	March 17, 1979
A magician brainwashes Fred into believing he is a giant chicken and Barney accidentally repeats the same process with Fred and several others until he realizes that his only option is to track down the magician and ask him to fix the problem.
8	8	"The Butler Did It...and Did It Better"	March 24, 1979
Fred purchases a new robot butler named Rollo and is initially satisfied until Rollo soon shows that he can do almost everything better than Fred.
9	9	"It's Not Their Bag"	March 31, 1979
While playing golf, Fred and Barney accidentally find a bag of money stolen from the Bank of Bedrock, and must evade the two robbers responsible.
10	10	"Barney's Luck"	April 7, 1979
Barney stumbles across a strange coin which seems to bring him good luck to no end (to the point that he wins the star prize on a game show for losing), frustrating Fred so much that he becomes determined to prove that the coin is not responsible.

=== Season 2 ===
No. overall	No. in season	Title	Original release date
11	1	"Stone Age Werewolf"	September 8, 1979 ^{1}
Fred and Barney go on a fishing trip to an island rumored to be haunted by a werewolf, but once they arrive, bad weather forces them to stay in the cabin of a friendly old man who is also the island's only resident.
12	2	"Fred & Barney Meet the Frankenstones"	September 15, 1979 ^{1}
After Fred and Barney are loaded with household chores, Fred sees an ad for a new condorstonium called Deadrock Arms and decides to check it out with Barney only for them to discover that it is a rather haunted establishment run by Frank Frankenstone and his family. Count Rockula and the Ghoulstones (recolored versions of Weirdly and Crepella Gruesome) make an appearance in the episode as one of the patrons.
13	3	"Physical Fitness Fred"	September 22, 1979 ^{1}
Jealous of Wilma and Betty's attraction to famous Hollyrock star Clark Gravel, Fred goes all out in a training regimen to get himself in shape in order to impress his wife.
14	4	"Moonlighters"	September 29, 1979 ^{1}
With prices skyrocketing and Mr. Slate reducing their salaries after misinterpreting their request for a raise, Fred and Barney try out various part-time jobs to compensate for their cash loss, in the process attempting to avoid being seen by Mr. Slate in order to keep their pride.
15	5	"Fred Goes to the Houndasaurs"	October 6, 1979 ^{1}
Wilma buys a pet Houndasaur without Fred's consent, which leads to no end of trouble for Fred, especially when he unknowingly comes across the Houndasaur's food and tries to patent it. Meanwhile, Dino becomes jealous of the Houndasaur and Fred receives complaints from the police.
16	6	"The Bad Luck Genie"	October 13, 1979 ^{1}
While fishing, Fred accidentally finds a bottled genie, who becomes their wish-granting servant but whose results seem to be more troublesome than beneficial. The episode makes references to classic fairy tales such as Aladdin and Pinocchio.
17	7	"Dinosaur Country Safari"	October 20, 1979 ^{1}
In order to avoid going to an opera, Fred and Barney take Wilma and Betty on a Dinosaur Country Safari, but Fred disobeys the noticeboard ordering visitors to stay in their cars, which leads to both Fred and Barney ending up trapped in a pterodactyl's nest and attempting to fly their way out.

- ^{1} These episodes, as well as first-season repeats, aired as part of Fred and Barney Meet the Thing

== Voice cast ==
- Henry Corden as Fred Flintstone, Taxi Driver (in "Haunted Inheritance"), Chadsworth Pettirock III (in "Haunted Inheritance"), Wee Willie (in "C.B. Buddies"), Charlie (in "It's Not Their Bag")
- Mel Blanc as Barney Rubble, Dino, Announcer (in "Haunted Inheritance"), Cleo (in "Haunted Inheritance"), Rockball Coach (in "C.B. Buddies"), Charlie's Partner (in "It's Not Their Bag"), Pterodactyl (in "It's Not Their Bag"), Rocky (in "Fred Goes to the Houndasaurus")
- Jean Vander Pyl as Wilma Flintstone, Pebbles Flintstone, Mrs. Fleece (in "Haunted Inheritance"), Mrs. Slate (in "C.B. Buddies", "Bedrock Rocks", "Moonlighters"), Atrocia Frankenstone (in "Fred & Barney Meet the Frankenstones"), Mrs. Ghoulstone (in "Fred & Barney Meet the Frankenstones"), Jenni the Genie (in "The Bad Luck Genie"), Jenni the Genie's Mother (in "The Bad Luck Genie")
- Gay Autterson as Betty Rubble, Gaga Grabor (in "Haunted Inheritance"), Countess (in "Blood Brothers"), News Reporter (in "It's Not Their Bag"), Hidea Frankenstone (in "Fred & Barney Meet the Frankenstones")
- Don Messick as Bamm-Bamm Rubble, Skunkasaurus (in "Sand-Witch"), Salesman (in "C.B. Buddies"), Louie (in "It's Not Their Bag"), Stonewall Nicely/Werewolf (in "Stone Age Werewolf"), various guest characters
- John Stephenson as Mr. Slate, Opening Announcer, Gregory Granite (in "Haunted Inheritance"), Mr. Fleece (in "Haunted Inheritance"), Chief of Police (in "C.B. Buddies"), Count Rockula (in "Blood Brothers", "Fred & Barney Meet the Frankenstones"), Rollo (in "The Butler Did It... and Did It Better"), George (in "The Butler Did It... and Did It Better"), Julius (in "It's Not Their Bag"), Police Officer (in "It's Not Their Bag"), Macystones Coin Store Salesman (in "Barney's Luck"), Frank Frankenstone (in "Fred & Barney Meet the Frankenstones"), Dr. Boulder (in "Phystical Fitness Fred"), Director (in "Physical Fitness Fred"), Mr. Wilson (in "Dinosaur Country Safari"), Park Ranger (in "Dinosaur Country Safari"), various guest characters
- Jim MacGeorge as Freaky Frankenstone (in "Fred & Barney Meet the Frankenstones"), Various guest characters
- Barney Phillips as Various guest characters
- Janet Waldo as The Sand-Witch (in "Sand-Witch"), Garnette (in "Blood Brothers"), Various guest characters
