= The Flintstones: Fred's Final Fling =

- Directed by: Oscar Dufau; Ray Patterson
- Voices of: Henry Corden; Mel Blanc; Jean Vander Pyl; Gay Autterson; John Stephenson; Don Messick
- Country of origin: United States
- Original language: English

Production
- Executive producers: William Hanna; Joseph Barbera
- Producer: Alex Lovy
- Running time: 30 minutes
- Production company: Hanna-Barbera Productions

Original release
- Network: NBC
- Release: November 7, 1980

Related
- The Flintstones' New Neighbors; Wind-Up Wilma

Fred's Final Fling is a 1980 animated television special and the second of The Flintstone Special limited-run prime time revival of The Flintstones produced by Hanna-Barbera Productions which premiered on NBC on November 7, 1980. It is an hour-long primetime special, broadcast as part of the 1980-1981 series The Flintstone Primetime Specials.

Like many animated series created by Hanna-Barbera in the 1970s, the show contained a laugh track created by the studio, one of the last productions to do so.

== Summary ==
When Frank Frankenstone's X-rays are mistaken for Fred's, the doctor tells him he only has 24 hours to live. Dazed by the news, Fred vows to do good deeds on his final day. After giving gifts to friends, he takes Wilma, Barney and Betty to the La Coo Coo Rocko restaurant where they dance the night away and go roller-skating. After falling asleep with exhaustion, Fred wakes up the next morning with the news that rumors of his demise were greatly exaggerated and that it was all a mistake.

== Voice cast ==
- Henry Corden as Fred Flintstone
- Mel Blanc as Barney Rubble, Dino
- Jean Vander Pyl as Wilma Flintstone, Pebbles Flintstone
- Gay Autterson as Betty Rubble
- John Stephenson as Frank Frankenstone
- Don Messick as Dr. Bonestone

== Home media ==
On October 9, 2012, Warner Archive released Fred's Final Fling on DVD in region 1 as part of their Hanna–Barbera Classics Collection, in a release entitled The Flintstones Prime-Time Specials Collection: Volume 2. This is a Manufacture-on-Demand (MOD) release, available exclusively through Warner's online store and Amazon.com.
