= The Flintstones Meet Rockula and Frankenstone =

- Directed by: Ray Patterson
- Voices of: Henry Corden; Mel Blanc; Jean Vander Pyl; Gay Autterson; John Stephenson
- Country of origin: United States
- Original language: English

Production
- Producer: Alex Lovy
- Running time: 48 minutes
- Production company: Hanna-Barbera Productions

Original release
- Network: NBC
- Release: October 30, 1979

Related
- The Flintstones: Little Big League; The Flintstones' New Neighbors

The Flintstones Meet Rockula and Frankenstone is a 1979 animated Halloween television special featuring The Flintstones. It was produced by Hanna-Barbera and first aired on October 30, 1979 on NBC.

In addition to the regular Flintstones voice cast, John Stephenson and Ted Cassidy played Count Rockula and Frankenstone, respectively.

== Plot ==
When Fred wins the big prize on the "Make A Deal or Don't" game show, he and Wilma plan a vacation with Barney and Betty to Count Rockula's spooky castle in Rocksylvania which has now been turned into a tourist resort. During the trip, Fred and Barney accidentally stumble across Rockula's old laboratory, where his unfinished Frankenstone monster sleeps, and forget to close the window when they leave the lab. Lightning subsequently strikes the machines in the lab, providing Frankenstone with life. Frankenstone awakens Rockula (who has been asleep for the past five hundred years, thus explaining his disappearance) from his secret crypt, and the two scare everyone out of the hotel, except for the Flintstones and the Rubbles, who had gone to bed early due to jet lag.

Rockula and Frankenstone eventually discover the Flintstones and Rubbles, and Rockula mistakes Wilma for his long-lost bride and vows to make her his, even if it means killing Fred. Wilma initially mistakes Rockula for the hotel manager, Mr. Silika, who had dressed up as Rockula, for quite some time until Rockula turns into a bat in front of her. As Fred, Barney and Betty discover Wilma's absence and begin searching for her, Wilma flees and a long cat-and-mouse chase ensues all over the castle. Rockula finds and corners Fred, but is scared off by Barney, wearing a werewolf mask. The couples eventually end up cornered inside the Rubbles' room. Fred challenges Rockula to a fight, using a bat statuette as a weapon, but the statuette turns out to be the switch for the trapdoor to Rockula's laboratory, which Rockula and Frankenstone were unknowingly standing on. As Fred raises the statuette to strike, Rockula and Frankenstone both fall through the trapdoor, and the Flintstones and Rubbles escape and return to Bedrock. Wilma invites Betty and Barney to stay for dinner and leaves the three of them in the living room while she goes into the kitchen to cook. Rockula pursues them in bat form and begs Wilma to marry him, promising her a life of luxury if she agrees. Winking at Fred, Barney and Betty (watching surreptitiously from the doorway), Wilma agrees to consider marrying Rockula, then immediately begins nagging him about chores, upkeep of the house, and his bad habits. Aghast, Rockula (apparently forgetting that most chores would be left to the servants) changes back into a bat and flies off, claiming to need another 500 years of rest. Barney laughs and lauds Wilma for defeating Rockula by telling him "the real truth about married life", to Betty's annoyance.

== Rockula and Frankenstone ==
- Count Rockula is a campy and not-so-bloodthirsty vampire with a lust for women and a fear of werewolves, which prompts him to build a Frankenstone monster to keep them away. Having been asleep for five hundred years, Rockula is awoken by Frankenstone and sets out to clear his castle of the guests and take Wilma, whom he thinks is his bride, for himself, even if it means killing Fred. Count Rockula also appears in the episodes "Blood Brothers" and "Fred and Barney Meet the Frankenstones" of The New Fred and Barney Show, again voiced by Stephenson, albeit in a completely different continuity because Rockula then has a bride, slightly different garments, and a pet werewolf despite having a fear for them in this film.
- Frankenstone is Count Rockula's unfinished creation, awoken prematurely when lightning strikes the machinery in Rockula's lab. His only mission in life is to carry out Rockula's orders, primarily to keep werewolves away from Rockula, although his low IQ often leads him to find difficulty in accomplishing even the simplest of tasks (in one particular scene, Frankenstone is ordered to search some barrels for Fred, and fails to notice Fred crouching right beside him). Despite the resemblance, he is not to be confused with the Frank Frankenstone character that first appeared in the episode "Fred & Barney Meet the Frankenstones" of The New Fred and Barney Show, the TV special The Flintstones' New Neighbors or The Flintstone Comedy Show. Frankenstone was one of Ted Cassidy's final roles; the actor, who was already famous for playing Frankenstein's monster-like roles due to his height (most notably Lurch on The Addams Family and several other productions), died ten months before the special was released.

== Voice cast ==
- Henry Corden as Fred Flintstone
- Mel Blanc as Barney Rubble, Dino
- Jean Vander Pyl as Wilma Flintstone, Frau G. (Gladys the housekeeper)
- Gay Autterson as Betty Rubble
- John Stephenson as Count Rockula
- Ted Cassidy as Frankenstone (Note: The film was released ten months after Cassidy's death.)
- Casey Kasem as Monty Marble
- Don Messick as Igor (Charlie the chauffeur), Wolf
- Lennie Weinrib as Mr. Silica, Bat

== Home media ==
The Flintstones Meet Rockula and Frankenstone was released on VHS and Laserdisc in 1989 by Hanna-Barbera Home Video.

In October 2012, Warner Archive released The Flintstones Meet Rockula and Frankenstone on DVD in region 1 as part of their Hanna–Barbera Classics Collection, in a release entitled The Flintstones Prime-Time Specials Collection: Volume 1. This is a Manufacture-on-Demand (MOD) release, available exclusively through Warner's online store and Amazon.com.

Warner Bros. Home Entertainment gave it its first wide release as part of the DVD collection The Flintstones: 2 Movies & 5 Specials in August 2020.

The program was re-broadcast by MeTV on October 30 and 31, 2020.
