= Bamm-Bamm Rubble =

Fictional character and adopted son of Barney and Betty Rubble

- The Flintstones character
- Bamm-Bamm Rubble as a baby
- First appearance: "Little Bamm-Bamm"; The Flintstones; October 3, 1963
- Created by: William Hanna; Joseph Barbera
- Voiced by: Baby; Don Messick (1963–1996); Gerry Johnson (1965; "Circus Business"); Dick Beals (1965); Ricky Page (1965); Lucille Bliss (Strong Kids, Safe Kids); Robyn Moore (Green's commercial); Elizabeth Daily (1994–present); Christine Cavanaugh (Cave Kids); Bill Farmer (The Flintstones: Bedrock Bowling); Seth MacFarlane (Family Guy); Eric Bauza (The Flintstones & WWE: Stone Age SmackDown!); Child; Lucille Bliss (A Flintstone Christmas); Frank Welker (The Flintstones: Little Big League); Ely Henry (Yabba-Dabba Dinosaurs); Teenager; Jay North (1971–1972); Micheal Sheehan (1980–1981); Tom Kenny (The Rubbles); Adult; Jerry Houser (1993); Seth MacFarlane (Family Guy)
- Portrayed by: Hlynur Sigurðsson & Marinó Sigurðsson (1994 film)

In-universe information
- Full name: Bamm-Bamm Rubble
- Species: Caveman
- Gender: Male
- Occupation: Auto mechanic (I Yabba-Dabba Do!); Screenwriter (Hollyrock-a-Bye Baby)
- Family: Barney Rubble (adoptive father); Betty Rubble (adoptive mother); Marblehead Sandstone (adoptive cousin); Fred Flintstone (father-in-law); Wilma Flintstone (mother-in-law); Stoney Flintstone (adoptive brother-in-law; A Flintstone Family Christmas)
- Spouse: Pebbles Flintstone (wife)
- Children: Roxy Rubble (daughter; Hollyrock-a-Bye Baby); Chip Rubble (son; Hollyrock-a-Bye Baby)

Bamm-Bamm Rubble (sometimes spelled Bam-Bam Rubble) is a fictional character in the Flintstones franchise, the adopted son of Barney and Betty Rubble. He is most famous in his toddler form on the animated series, but has also appeared at various other ages, including as a teenager on the early 1970s spin-off The Pebbles and Bamm-Bamm Show and as an adult in three television films. Cartoonist Gene Hazelton contributed to the original model sheets for the character, and he has said that he based Bamm-Bamm's design on his own son, Wes.

== Biography ==
Bamm-Bamm is the adopted son of Betty and Barney Rubble after they found him left on their doorstep. After meeting his next-door neighbor Pebbles, they become friends. Bamm-Bamm's name came from a note left in the basket, causing Barney and Betty confusion over the strange name. This was explained when Bamm-Bamm yelled the phrase "Bamm, Bamm!" and swung his club. Bamm-Bamm's excessive (and sometimes misused) strength was often a source of humor in the episodes in which the toddler version of Bamm-Bamm appeared. Unlike Pebbles, Bamm-Bamm was past the crawling stage and could be seen in a few episodes trying to help Pebbles walk.

As a teenager, Bamm-Bamm attended Bedrock High School along with Pebbles and they dated each other. In this version, Bamm-Bamm's super strength, while visible in the form of his muscular physique, was demonstrated less frequently. He became more passive and sensible and tended to be dominated by Pebbles's more aggressive personality. He was the owner of a "cave buggy", a prehistoric version of a dune buggy.

As an adult, Bamm-Bamm became a mechanic and married Pebbles. The two soon moved to Hollyrock (a fictionalized, prehistoric version of Hollywood) so Bamm-Bamm could pursue his true goal of becoming a screenwriter. Later, the couple had twins, Charleston Frederick "Chip" and Roxeanne Elizabeth "Roxy" Flintstone-Rubble.

=== Film ===
Pebbles Flintstone and Bamm-Bamm Rubble, from Bamm-Bamm's debut in The Flintstones season-four episode "Little Bamm-Bamm"

In the 1994 live-action Flintstones movie, Bamm-Bamm appears as a four-year-old who is adopted after Fred secretly gives money to Barney and Betty to ensure that they could afford the adoption. Bamm-Bamm is seen with long, matted, filthy-brown hair and only wearing a fig leaf loincloth. He was mentioned to have been raised by wild mastodons, a parody of various examples of interspecies adoption. This also hinted at how Bamm-Bamm had gained his incredible super-strength. Bamm-Bamm soon started to look like his cartoon counterpart after a bath, a haircut, and some new clothes. Bamm-Bamm was played by twins Hlynur Sigurðsson and Marinó Sigurðsson and voiced by actress E.G. Daily, who succeeded Don Messick in the role after his death.

Though Bamm-Bamm does not appear in the prequel film The Flintstones in Viva Rock Vegas, the name of the film's antagonist, Chip, is a reference to the name of Bamm-Bamm's son. Chip's mistress, Roxy, also gets her name from Bamm-Bamm and Pebbles' daughter.

Bamm-Bamm appears with his family in Space Jam: A New Legacy. He, his family, and the Flintstones are among the Warner Bros. 3000 Seververse inhabitants that watch the basketball game between the Tune Squad and the Goon Squad. When the inhabitants were seen making their way towards the sight of the game, Bamm-Bamm is seen getting picked up by Fred Flintstone.

== Chronology ==
Through the various Flintstones incarnations, the age of Bamm-Bamm has varied wildly from spinoff to spinoff, appearing as an adolescent in one spinoff and as an infant again in the next. Arranged roughly in chronological order, the Flintstones incarnations in which Bamm-Bamm has made appearances are:

=== Infant and toddler ===
- The Flintstones
- The Man Called Flintstone
- The New Fred and Barney Show
- The Flintstones' New Neighbors
- The Flintstones: Wind-Up Wilma
- A Flintstones Christmas Carol
- Cave Kids
- The Flintstones & WWE: Stone Age SmackDown!
- Space Jam: A New Legacy
- Fruity Pebbles, Post commercials

=== Child and preteen ===
- A Flintstone Christmas
- The Flintstones: Little Big League
- The Flintstones (live-action)
- Yabba Dabba Dinosaurs

=== Teenager ===
- The Pebbles and Bamm-Bamm Show
- Hanna-Barbera Educational Filmstrips featuring Bamm-Bamm: "Term Paper" and "Information Please"
- The Flintstone Comedy Show
- The Flintstone Funnies
- The Rubbles

=== Adult ===
- I Yabba-Dabba Do!
- Hollyrock-a-Bye Baby
- A Flintstone Family Christmas

== Casting ==
Bamm-Bamm's voice over the years was provided by Jay North, Don Messick, Lucille Bliss, Frank Welker, Christine Cavanaugh, Michael Sheehan, Elizabeth Daily, Jerry Houser, Dee Bradley Baker and Ely Henry. In Bedrock, Bamm-Bamm was going to be voiced by Manny Jacinto. However the series was scrapped in July 2024.
