= The Flintstones: Jogging Fever =

1981 Flintstones TV special

- Directed by: Ray Patterson
- Voices of: Henry Corden; Mel Blanc; Jean Vander Pyl; Gay Autterson; John Stephenson; Frank Welker
- Country of origin: United States
- Original language: English

Production
- Executive producers: William Hanna; Joseph Barbera
- Producer: Alex Lovy
- Running time: 30 minutes
- Production company: Hanna-Barbera Productions

Original release
- Network: NBC
- Release: October 11, 1981

Related
- Wind-Up Wilma; The Flintstones' 25th Anniversary Celebration

Jogging Fever is a 1981 animated television special and the fourth and final of The Flintstone Special limited-run prime time revival of The Flintstones produced by Hanna-Barbera Productions which premiered on NBC on October 11, 1981.

Jogging Fever was animated at Filman, an animation studio in Madrid, Spain (headed by Carlos Alfonso and Juan Pina) who did much animation work for Hanna-Barbera between the early 1970s through the mid-1980s. This was also notable for being the final television special to feature Hanna-Barbera's controversial studio-made laugh track, which was used throughout the 1970s.

== Summary ==
After failing his annual physical, Fred wants to prove to everyone (including his boss Mr. Slate) that he is in shape, so he decides to become the first citizen of Bedrock to enter the Rockstone Marathon. He wants to become a local celebrity.

== Voice cast ==
- Henry Corden as Fred Flintstone
- Mel Blanc as Barney Rubble
- Jean Vander Pyl as Wilma Flintstone, Pebbles Flintstone
- Gay Autterson as Betty Rubble
- John Stephenson as Frank Frankenstone, Mr. Slate
- Frank Welker as Creepy, Announcer, Dino
- Wayne Morton as Additional Voices

== Home media ==
On October 9, 2012, Warner Archive released Jogging Fever on DVD in region 1 as part of their Hanna–Barbera Classics Collection, in a release entitled The Flintstones Prime-Time Specials Collection: Volume 2. It was a Manufacture-on-Demand release, available exclusively through Warner's online store and Amazon.com.
