= Strong Kids, Safe Kids =

1984 direct-to-video film

- Directed by: Rick Hauser
- Written by: Rick Hauser
- Produced by: Rick Hauser; Wen-D Kersten; Henry Winkler
- Starring: Henry Winkler; Sol Gordon; Kee MacFarlane; Chris Wallace; John Ritter; Mariette Hartley; Don Messick; Hal Smith; Henry Corden; Lucille Bliss; Danny Goldman; June Foray; Dana Kavin
- Narrated by: Hannah Mason Hauser
- Music by: David Carr; Ole Goerg; Don Waldrop
- Production companies: Fair Dinkum Productions; Hanna-Barbera Productions; Paramount Home Video
- Distributed by: Paramount Home Video
- Release date: 16 September 1984
- Running time: 42 minutes
- Country: United States
- Language: English

Strong Kids, Safe Kids is a 1984 direct-to-video PSA film, hosted by Henry Winkler, that teaches basic skills to parents and children to help prevent sexual abuse and other dangerous situations. The video features guest appearances from Fonzie, Sol Gordon, Kee MacFarlane, Chris Wallace, John Ritter, Mariette Hartley, and a cast of Hanna-Barbera cartoon characters, including Yogi Bear, the Flintstones, Scooby-Doo, the Smurfs and Pac-Man.

The video was produced in 1983-1984 by Winkler's company Fair Dinkum Productions in association with Paramount Home Video (who also distributed the video), out of concern about the safety of his children. It was available at high schools, music libraries and civic functions, and was sold at children's bookstores and video outlets for $29.95. It sold 75,000 cassettes.

== Plot ==
Henry Winkler tells parents how to protect their children, and offers ways for children to recognize and avoid dangerous situations. Fonzie and other celebrities also encourage parents to discuss human sexuality with young children, and children to talk to trusted adults about their problems.

== Cast ==
- Henry Winkler as Arthur "The Fonz" Fonzarelli and himself
- Sol Gordon as himself
- Kee MacFarlane as herself
- Chris Wallace as himself
- John Ritter as himself
- Mariette Hartley as herself
- Don Messick as Papa Smurf, Scooby-Doo and Scrappy-Doo
- Hal Smith as Yogi Bear, Dino and Ghost
- Henry Corden as Fred Flintstone
- Lucille Bliss as Pebbles Flintstone, Bamm-Bamm Rubble, Smurfette and Baby Smurf
- Danny Goldman as Brainy Smurf
- June Foray as Jokey Smurf and Pac-Baby
- William H. Angarola as Pac-Man (uncredited)
- Dana Kavin as Little Girl
- Hannah Mason Hauser as The Narrator
