= Jim MacGeorge =

American actor (1928–2021)

- MacGeorge as Stan Laurel in Get Smart, 1969
- Born: James Andrew MacGeorge; October 9, 1928
- Died: January 16, 2021 (aged 92)
- Other names: James MacGeorge; Jim McGeorge
- Occupations: Voice actor; puppeteer; stand-up comedian; writer
- Years active: 1952–2021

James Andrew MacGeorge (October 9, 1928 – January 16, 2021) was an American voice actor, puppeteer, stand-up comedian and writer. He is also credited Jim McGeorge and James MacGeorge.

== Career ==
He is probably best known for his voice roles as Beany Boy, Crowy and Uncle Captain Horatio K. Huffenpuff in Beany and Cecil, Oliver Hardy on The Laurel and Hardy Cartoon Show, Crazy Claws in The Kwicky Koala Show, Bort in The Mighty Orbots, Wimper in Clue Club and as Dr. Wilmer Scarab in Bionic Six. He also voiced various characters in many other cartoon series and worked as a writer for Jay Ward Productions.

He appeared on camera as Stan Laurel in shows including Get Smart, Semi-Tough, Happy Days and the feature film Teenagers from Outer Space.

MacGeorge has reprised his role only as Uncle Captain Huffenpuff in The New Adventures of Beany and Cecil produced by DiC Entertainment and directed by John Kricfalusi, better known for his work on The Ren and Stimpy Show.

== Filmography ==
=== Animated Roles ===
- 1952 - Thunderbolt the Wondercolt - Various
- 1959 - Matty's Funday Funnies - Beany Boy / Uncle Captain Horatio K. Huffenpuff
- 1962 - Beany and Cecil - Beany Boy / Crowy / Uncle Captain Horatio K. Huffenpuff
- 1963 - The New Casper Cartoon Show - Various Voices
- 1966-1967 - The Laurel and Hardy Cartoon Show - Oliver Hardy
- 1969-1970 - Scooby Doo, Where Are You? - Additional Voices
- 1971-1972 - The Funky Phantom - Additional Voices
- 1972 - The New Scooby Doo Movies - Oliver Hardy / Additional Voices
- 1972 - Wait Till Your Father Gets Home - Headlight Specialist / Service Manager - (As James MacGeorge)
- 1973 - Speed Buggy - Additional Voices
- 1973 - Yogi's Gang - Additional Voices
- 1976 - Clue Club - Wimper
- 1977-1978 - The Skatebirds - Wimper
- 1977-1978 - The Three Robonic Stooges - Wimper
- 1977-1980 - Captain Caveman and the Teen Angels - Additional Voices
- 1978 - The Buford Files - Additional Voices
- 1978 - Buford and the Galloping Ghost - Additional Voices
- 1978 - Yogi's Space Race - Additional Voices
- 1978-79 - Galaxy Goof-Ups - Additional Voices
- 1979 - The New Fred and Barney Show - Additional Voices - (As Jim McGeorge)
- 1979 - Casper and the Angels - Additional Voices
- 1979-1980 - The New Shmoo - Additional Voices
- 1980-1981 - The Flintstone Primetime Specials - Stubby Frankenstone / Additional Voices
- 1980 - The Flintstones' New Neighbors - TV special - Stubby Frankenstone / Additional Voices
- 1981 - The Flintstones: Wind-Up Wilma - TV special - Stubby Frankenstone / Cop / Additional Voices - (As Jim McGeorge)
- 1981 - The Kwicky Koala Show - Crazy Claws
- 1981 - The Richie Rich/Scooby-Doo Show - Additional Voices
- 1982 - Richie Rich - Additional Voices
- 1984 - The Mighty Orbots - Bort
- 1985 - The Jetsons - Additional Voices - (Second Series)
- 1987 - Foofur - Additional Voices
- 1987 - Bionic Six - Dr. Wilmer Scarab / Mrs. Scarab
- 1987 - DuckTales - Genghis Khan - (As Jim McGeorge)
- 1988 - The New Adventures of Beany and Cecil - Uncle Captain Horatio K. Huffenpuff
- 1989 - The Smurfs - Additional Voices
- 1991 - TaleSpin - Dissident / Mick
- 2007 - Random! Cartoons - Giovanni

=== Film Roles ===
- 1959 - Teenagers from Outer Space - Mac - Cop
- 1968 - The World of Hans Christian Andersen - Kasper Kat / Governor / Han's Father - (English Dub) - (Released March 1, 1971 United States)
- 1977 - Star Wars - Several Characters

=== Live-Action Roles ===
- 1958 - You Bet Your Life - Himself - Comic Book Storyline Writer - (As James MacGeorge)
- 1970 - Get Smart - Stan Laurel
- 1970 - Happy Days - King Kong's Trainer
- 1980 - Semi-Tough - Purlie
- 1985 - Dom DeLuise and Friends - Himself
- 2011 - Laurel and Hardy: Their Lives and Magic - TV movie documentary - Himself - (Final Role)

=== Writer ===
- 1967 - George of the Jungle - 17 episodes - 5 Scripts
- 1967 - Super Chicken - 16 episodes
- 1967 - Tom Slick - 17 episodes
- 1987 - Bionic Six - Story 1 Episode
