= The Flintstones: Wind-Up Wilma =

- Written by: Len Janson
- Directed by: Carl Urbano
- Voices of: Henry Corden; Mel Blanc; Jean Vander Pyl; Gay Autterson; John Stephenson; Don Messick
- Music by: Hoyt Curtin
- Country of origin: United States
- Original language: English

Production
- Executive producers: William Hanna; Joseph Barbera
- Producer: Alex Lovy
- Editors: Gil Iverson; Robert Ciaglia
- Running time: 30 minutes
- Production company: Hanna-Barbera Productions

Original release
- Network: NBC
- Release: October 4, 1981

Related
- Fred's Final Fling; Jogging Fever

Wind-Up Wilma is a 1981 animated television special and the third of The Flintstone Specials limited-run prime time revival of The Flintstones produced by Hanna-Barbera Productions. The special premiered on NBC on October 4, 1981. In the special, Wilma Flintstone is recruited to play on Bedrock's baseball team.

Like many animated series created by Hanna-Barbera in the 1970s, the show contained a laugh track created by the studio, one of the last productions to do so.

== Summary ==
Wilma is a celebrity when she gets a shot at the big leagues and becomes a pitcher for the Bedrock Dodgers after nailing a couple of robbers with a melon at the grocery store; however, she and Fred argue over her ambition to pitch for the team because Fred thinks a woman's place is in the home.

== Voice cast ==
- Henry Corden as Fred Flintstone
- Mel Blanc as Barney Rubble, Dino
- Jean Vander Pyl as Wilma Flintstone, Pebbles Flintstone
- Gay Autterson as Betty Rubble, Traffic Cop
- John Stephenson as Frank Frankenstone
- Julie McWhirter as Hidea Frankenstone
- Jim MacGeorge as Stubby Frankenstone, Cop
- Don Messick as Announcer
- Joe Baker as Mean, Checker
- Paul Winchell as Umpire, Thief, Reporter #1
- Frank Welker as Finrock

== Home media ==
On October 9, 2012, Warner Archive released Wind-Up Wilma on DVD in region 1 as part of their Hanna-Barbera Classic Collection, in a release entitled The Flintstones Prime-Time Specials Collection: Volume 2. This is a Manufacture-on-Demand (MOD) release, available exclusively through Warner's online store and Amazon.com.
