= Gerry Johnson =

American actress (1918–1990)

- Born: Geraldine Adelaide Schreiber; April 4, 1918; Jersey City, New Jersey, U.S.
- Died: January 24, 1990 (aged 71); Los Angeles, California, U.S.
- Occupations: Actress, television host
- Years active: 1950s–1967

Gerry Johnson (born Geraldine Adelaide Schreiber; April 4, 1918 – January 24, 1990) was an American actress and television host, best known as the voice of Betty Rubble during seasons five and six of the animated television series The Flintstones.

== Early life ==
Geraldine Adelaide Schreiber was born in Jersey City, New Jersey. Johnson was raised in Los Angeles. Her study of drama began when she was six years old. She won contests in drama at Madame Gordon's School for Girls and Beverly Hills High School and won the California Shakespearean Award. She graduated from Stanford University, where she majored in speech and drama.

== Career ==
Among her many stage, TV, and screen credits, Johnson created and hosted her own TV variety show in Dallas, Texas, Gerry Johnson's Variety Fair in the 1950s and played Lady Bracknell in The Importance of Being Earnest and several characters in Under Milk Wood in the opening season of the Dallas Theater Center. While she worked in Dallas, TV Guide selected her as the winner of its Outstanding TV Personality in the Southwest award. After moving back to Los Angeles in 1961, she co-hosted on Red Rowe's Panorama Pacific.

Johnson provided voices for The Flintstones and other Hanna-Barbera productions, and guest-starred on Bewitched. In 1964, she was hired by Joseph Barbera as the new voice of Betty Rubble for the final two seasons of The Flintstones, replacing Bea Benaderet who left the series due to scheduling conflicts while she was starring in the series Petticoat Junction. Johnson provided the voice of a Frenchwoman, an Englishwoman and Betty in the 1966 feature film The Man Called Flintstone before departing from voice acting.

== Personal life ==
Johnson married Warren Martin Johnson in June 1941 in Beverly Hills, California. He worked in public relations for Taylor Publishing Company. They had two children.

== Filmography ==
- My Dog, Buddy (1960) - Elizabeth Lynch
- Bewitched - episode (1964) - A Vision of Sugar Plums - Mrs. Johnson
- The Flintstones - 52 episodes (1964-1966) - Betty Rubble/additional voices
- The Atom Ant/Secret Squirrel Show (1965) - Additional Voices
- The Man Called Flintstone (1966) - Betty Rubble
