= Ted Nichols =

American musician and composer (1928–2026)

- Born: Theodore Nicholas Sflotsos; October 2, 1928; Missoula, Montana, U.S.
- Died: January 9, 2026 (aged 97) Auburn, Washington, U.S.
- Occupation: Composer
- Years active: 1950s–2012

Ted Nichols (October 2, 1928 – January 9, 2026), born Theodore Nicholas Sflotsos, but legally changed his name at age 19, was an American composer, conductor, arranger, educator and minister of music. He is best known for his work at Hanna-Barbera Productions from 1963 to 1972, where he composed scores for various shows produced by the studio such as Scooby-Doo, Where Are You!, Space Ghost, Birdman and the Galaxy Trio, and Josie and the Pussycats, among others.

== Early life ==
Theodore Nicholas Sflotsos was born in Missoula, Montana on October 2, 1928, as the only child of Nicholas Theodore Sflotsos (first generation Greek immigrant) and Josephine Ellen (Schomer) Sflotsos. He was raised in the Greek Orthodox church, later becoming an evangelical. His parents moved to Spokane, Washington, where he graduated from John R. Rogers High School. He then joined the navy, where he was trained as an aviation electrician. During specialist training in Jacksonville, Florida, he played saxophone in the navy swing band, he also plays the violin and clarinet. He was later transferred to Corpus Christi, Texas, where he founded, directed and played in the base swing band. In 1948, he legally changed his name to Ted Nichols.

== Education and career ==
After leaving the navy, Nichols attended Baylor University received his bachelor's degree in 1952. In response to the Korean War, he joined the Air Force ROTC program. Upon graduation, the air force sent him to Sampson Air Force Base in New York where he founded and then became Commanding Officer of the Air Force Bandsmen Training School, recruiting musicians from Eastman School of Music, Juilliard School, and other Eastern music schools.

After the military service, Nichols returned to Corpus Christi, founded and directed the Corpus Christi Youth Symphony while teaching in public school, and earning his master's degree at Texas A&I University. Wanting to work on a doctorate and having a desire to compose for films, Nichols and family moved to California.

In the mid-1950s, Nichols began work in public schools in California before moving onto Santa Ana College as band director (1958–60). He became a "Dapper Dan" barbershop-style singer at Disneyland, and occasionally joined Walt Disney for coffee on Main Street.

Nichols served as Minister of Music (1960–72) at Church of the Open Door (4,000 attendance on Sunday mornings) while J. Vernon McGee was Senior Pastor. From 1972 to 1975 Nichols became Musical Director of Campus Crusade for Christ.

While Nichols served at the Church of the Open Door, a choir member introduced Nichols to studio co-founder William Hanna. This led to Nichols serving as musical director at Hanna-Barbera from 1963 to 1972. He co-wrote the score for the first incarnation of Jonny Quest alongside longtime composer Hoyt Curtin, and would later write musical cues and arrangements for Scooby-Doo, Where Are You!, Josie and the Pussycats, season 6 of The Flintstones, Shazzan, Birdman and the Galaxy Trio, The New Adventures of Huckleberry Finn, Space Ghost, Sinbad Jr. and His Magic Belt, and the full-length feature The Man Called Flintstone (1966). During this time, Nichols wrote film scores for World Wide Pictures.

Nichols wrote or composed music for several operas.

== Death ==
Nichols died of complications from Alzheimer's disease at hospice care in Auburn, Washington, on January 9, 2026, at the age of 97. His death was not announced to the public until late March.
