= The Flintstone Comedy Show =

1980 American animated television series

- Title card
- Genre: Comedy
- Created by: William Hanna; Joseph Barbera
- Directed by: Ray Patterson; George Gordon; Rudy Zamora
- Voices of: Gay Autterson; Mel Blanc; Henry Corden; Ruta Lee; Kenneth Mars; Mitzi McCall; Don Messick; Charles Nelson Reilly; Paul Reubens; Zelda Rubinstein; Michael Sheehan; John Stephenson; Russi Taylor; Jean Vander Pyl; Lennie Weinrib; Frank Welker; Janet Waldo; Paul Winchell
- Narrated by: Kenneth Mars ("Captain Caveman" segments)
- Theme music composer: Hoyt Curtin
- Composer: Hoyt Curtin
- Country of origin: United States
- Original language: English
- No. of seasons: 2
- No. of episodes: 18 (126 segments)

Production
- Executive producers: William Hanna; Joseph Barbera
- Producers: Alex Lovy; Carl Urbano
- Running time: 90 minutes (1980–81); 60 minutes (1981)
- Production company: Hanna-Barbera Productions

Original release
- Network: NBC
- Release: November 22, 1980 – October 24, 1981

Related
- Fred and Barney Meet the Shmoo; The Flintstone Funnies

The Flintstone Comedy Show is an American animated television series revival and spin-off of The Flintstones produced by Hanna-Barbera that aired on NBC from November 22, 1980, to October 24, 1981. Outside North America, the show was released under title of Flintstone Frolics.

The series contained six segments: The Flintstone Family Adventures; Bedrock Cops; Pebbles, Dino and Bamm-Bamm; Captain Caveman; Dino and the Cavemouse; and The Frankenstones.

== Overview ==
The series also featured new characters (the Frankenstones, the Cavemouse) as well as older characters (Penny, Wiggy, Moonrock and Schleprock of 1971's The Pebbles and Bamm-Bamm Show and 1972's The Flintstone Comedy Hour on CBS, Al Capp's the Shmoo from his show The New Shmoo which aired on NBC in 1979, and Captain Caveman from his own series on ABC in 1977 which lasted three seasons).

A series of gags, educational spots, games, how-to-draw and a dance-of-the-week were featured in-between the six segments every week. In 1982, reruns of the show were repackaged for two seasons under the title The Flintstone Funnies.

== Segments ==
=== The Flintstone Family Adventures ===
This segment featured the traditional antics and adventures of The Flintstones and The Rubbles.

Season 1 (1980–81)

No. overall	No. in season	Title	Original release date
1	1	"R.V. Fever"	November 22, 1980
As the Flintstones and the Rubbles take a road trip, the R.V. trailer with Fred and Barney comes unhitched.
2	2	"Sands of the Saharastone"	November 29, 1980
The Flintstones and the Rubbles take a trip to Algeristone, where Wilma and Betty are abducted by sheiks who wish to add them to their harems.
3	3	"Gold Fever"	December 6, 1980
Fred and Barney go on a trip to the Bedrock Mountains to search for gold, until some claim jumpers try to capture them.
4	4	"Bogged Down"	December 13, 1980
After Barney sells a dilapidated resort that he inherited from his uncle, Fred discovers oil on the property.
5	5	"Be Patient, Fred"	December 20, 1980
Fred is hospitalized to get his tonsils removed, but is mistaken for another patient scheduled for extensive surgery.
6	6	"Country Club Clods"	December 27, 1980
Fred introduces the Frankenstone family to the Bedrock Country Club, but soon regrets it when they wreak havoc and terror.
7	7	"The Rockdale Diet"	January 3, 1981
Fred attempts to lose weight by following the Rockdale Diet, with less than satisfactory results.
8	8	"Dino's Girl"	January 10, 1981
When Fred unwittingly brings home Mr. Slate's pet dinosaur Dina, he soon discovers that Dino is in love with her.
9	9	"The Gourmet Dinner"	January 17, 1981
Fred and Wilma invite Mr. and Mrs. Slate to accompany them to the Frankenstones' house for a gourmet meal.
10	10	"The Stand-In"	January 24, 1981
Fred and Wilma are hired as stands-ins for their favorite stars when the actors arrive in Bedrock to film a new movie.
11	11	"Go Take a Hike"	January 31, 1981
Fred and Barney take a turbulent hike to the mountains with Pebbles, Bamm-Bamm, Moonrock and the Frankenstone kids.

Season 2 (1981)

No. overall	No. in season	Title	Original release date
12	1	"The Great Bedrock Air Race"	September 12, 1981
Fred and Barney assemble Mr. Slate's new "Aerosubmabus", which they use to compete in the Great Bedrock Air Race.
13	2	"Fred's Last Resort"	September 19, 1981
A visit to a health spa where fitness instructor O.K. Simpstone turns into a nightmare for Fred when he endures a vigorous massage and a workout at the gym and soon runs into the adjoining Bedrock Penitentiary.
14	3	"The Not-Such-A-Pleasure Cruise"	September 26, 1981
Fred is looking forward to a peaceful cruise, but the vacation turns into a disaster when he encounters pirates.
15	4	"Fred's Big Top Flop"	October 3, 1981
The Flintstones and the Rubbles perform in the circus after Fred is mistaken for one of "The Flying Flintstonis".
16	5	"In a Stew"	October 10, 1981
Fred buys a diner and plans to impress the Phantom Food Freak, the food critic of The Daily Granite, with the dining experience of a lifetime.
17	6	"Fred vs. the Energy Crisis"	October 17, 1981
Fred believes that he has solved the energy crisis with his invention of a hot tub heated by wind power called "The Flintstone Rockuzzi".
18	7	"Fred's Friend in Need"	October 24, 1981
Fred helps an old friend, the once-wealthy Rockwell Granite, who needs to secure a large loan from a local banker.

=== Bedrock Cops ===
In 1975, Alan Reed revealed in an interview with radio historian Chuck Schaden that Hanna-Barbera was developing a series about Fred and Barney's adventures as Bedrock policemen. Alan Reed died on June 14, 1977, while the cartoon was still in development and was replaced by Henry Corden.

In this segment, Fred and Barney are part-time police officers assisted by the Shmoo as a trainee where they work under the direction of Sgt. Boulder. The trio fought crime in the city of Bedrock, most of the time chasing after the Frankenstones' pet monster Rockjaw.

Season 1 (1980–81)

No. overall	No. in season	Title	Original release date
1	1	"Fred Goes Ape"	November 22, 1980
Fred and Barney are assigned to guard the Bedrock Zoo, but trouble begins when a gorillasaurus escapes.
2	2	"Off the Beaten Track"	November 29, 1980
Fred and Barney are assigned to guard the Turbo Rock race car at the Bedrock Grand Prix, which is stolen by two escaped convicts.
3	3	"A Bad Case of Rockjaw"	December 6, 1980
Fred, Barney and the Shmoo patrol Bedrock Park, where they encounter Rockjaw causing mischief by wrecking trees.
4	4	"Follow That Dogasaurus"	December 13, 1980
Fred and Barney must save Sgt. Boulder's pet dogosaurus and stop the numerous dogosaurus thefts in Bedrock.
5	5	"Mountain Frustration"	December 20, 1980
Fred and Barney investigate strange noises and footprints on Mount Bedrock and discover that Rockjaw haunts the mountain.
6	6	"Bedlam on the Bedrock Express"	December 27, 1980
Fred and Barney load a fortune in gold onto the Bedrock Express, but they inadvertently stack it onto a bank robber's rail car.
7	7	"Hot Air to Spare"	January 3, 1981
As Fred and Barney escort Hotwire Harry from the courthouse to the jail, the car thief tricks them and escapes.
8	8	"Rockjaw Rides Again"	January 10, 1981
Fred and Barney investigate weird geological activity in the Bedrock Valley area caused by Rockjaw eating rocks.
9	9	"Pretty Kitty"	January 17, 1981
Fred and Barney chase after Kitty, a saber-toothed tiger eating all the food at a wealthy heiress' garden party.
10	10	"The Roller Robber"	January 24, 1981
Fred, Barney and the Shmoo pursue the Roller Robber, a thief on wheels who steals a famous singer's jewels and furs.
11	11	"Put Up Your Duke"	January 31, 1981
Fred, Barney and the Shmoo are assigned to guard the Duke of Feldspar while he visits a local amusement park.

Season 2 (1981)

No. overall	No. in season	Title	Original release date
12	1	"Undercover Shmoo"	September 12, 1981
Fred, Barney and the Shmoo go undercover to capture the "Hole in the Head" gang and save a famous work of art.
13	2	"On the Ball"	September 19, 1981
Fred and Barney cannot attend the annual Policeman's Ball when Sgt. Boulder assigns them to catch a jewel thief – Rockjaw.
14	3	"Shop Treatment"	September 26, 1981
Fred and Barney chase after Rockjaw, who is munching on the merchandise of Bloomingrock's department store.
15	4	"Country Clubbed"	October 3, 1981
Fred and Barney pursue a sly thief who stole the winner's prize money at a celebrity golf tournament.
16	5	"Barney and the Bandit"	October 10, 1981
While patrolling Bedrock Park, Fred and Barney have their motorcycle stolen and uncover a gang of car thieves.
17	6	"Shore Thing"	October 17, 1981
Fred and Barney patrol Bedrock Beach where they chase after a hungry Rockjaw, who is terrorizing the beach.
18	7	"Rotten Actors"	October 24, 1981
Fred and Barney are assigned to guard a movie set, which is a cover for a staged robbery planned by the actors.

=== Pebbles, Dino and Bamm-Bamm ===
This was a Flintstones-themed adaptation of the "mystery-solving teens and a pet" format popularized by Scooby-Doo and its various spin-offs in the 1970s (including Captain Caveman's original show on ABC). In this series, Pebbles and Bamm-Bamm (similar, yet aged down a little, from their appearance in The Pebbles and Bamm-Bamm Show) with pet dinosaur Dino solve mysteries in the city of Bedrock. They would sometimes be accompanied by pals Penny, Wiggy and Moonrock. Most bad guys that are defeated would end up arrested by Sgt. Boulder.

Season 1 (1980–81)

No. overall	No. in season	Title	Original release date
1	1	"The Ghost Sitters"	November 22, 1980
Pebbles, Bamm-Bamm, and Dino babysit little Bratrock in a house that is haunted by the Ghost of Bronco Billy.
2	2	"Secret of Scary Valley"	November 29, 1980
Pebbles, Bamm-Bamm, and Dino are chased by a UFO and aliens through the rose-covered terrain of Scary Valley.
3	3	"The Witch of the Wardrobe"	December 6, 1980
At the Bedrock Department Store, a witch ruins the fashion show of the year when she changes the latest fashions into rags.
4	4	"Monster Madness"	December 13, 1980
Pebbles and Bamm-Bamm try to retrieve their baseball in an eerie castle where they meet Count Rockula and his monsters Igorstone, Ogre, a Wolfasaurus, and a skeleton.
5	5	"The Show Must Go On"	December 20, 1980
Pebbles decides the Bedrock Bijou, an abandoned and haunted theater, would be the perfect venue for the school's talent show.
6	6	"The Beast of Muscle Rock Beach"	December 27, 1980
A creepy beast is on the loose while Pebbles, Bamm-Bamm, and Dino are on a picnic at Muscle Rock Beach.
7	7	"In Tune With Terror"	January 3, 1981
Pebbles and Bamm-Bamm investigate the disappearance of a famous singer and a phantom haunting a recording studio.
8	8	"The Curse of Tutrockamen"	January 10, 1981
Pebbles, Bamm-Bamm, and Dino meet a mysterious mummy while visiting the Tutrockamen exhibit at the museum.
9	9	"The Hideous Hiss of the Lizard Monster"	January 17, 1981
While searching for Dino in an abandoned gold mine, Pebbles and Bamm-Bamm confront a horrifying hissing lizard monster.
10	10	"The Legend of Haunted Forest"	January 24, 1981
Pebbles, Bamm-Bamm, and Dino investigate a stolen painting in a forest haunted by legendary woodsman Paul Bunstone.
11	11	"Double Trouble with Long John Silverock"	January 31, 1981
During a thunderstorm, Pebbles and Bamm-Bamm seek shelter at Richstone Manor where they meet two suspicious carpenters.

Season 2 (1981)

No. overall	No. in season	Title	Original release date
12	1	"A Night of Fright"	September 12, 1981
After their car gets stuck during a violent storm, Pebbles, Bamm-Bamm, and Dino seek shelter at a haunted house.
13	2	"The Dust Devil of Palm Rock Springs"	September 19, 1981
Pebbles, Bamm-Bamm, and Dino discover that the Dust Devil of Palm Rock Springs is haunting a resort hotel.
14	3	"Dino and the Zombies"	September 26, 1981
Pebbles, Bamm-Bamm, and Dino encounter mysterious events in the cemetery while investigating the disappearance of a thief.
15	4	"The Ghost of the Neanderthal Giant"	October 3, 1981
Pebbles, Bamm-Bamm, and Dino visit the caves of the legendary Neanderthals which are haunted by the ghost of a huge primitive man.
16	5	"Creature from the Rock Lagoon"	October 10, 1981
An eerie sea creature from the Rock Lagoon captures Pebbles, Bamm-Bamm, Dino, and their friend Mr. Saltrock.
17	6	"Dino and the Giant Spiders"	October 17, 1981
Pebbles, Bamm-Bamm, and Dino discover the lair of the Spider Woman and her strange pets in Spider Valley.
18	7	"The Ghastly Gatorsaurus"	October 24, 1981
Pebbles and Bamm-Bamm rush to save Dino from the clutches of a concrete-eating gatorsaurus.

=== Captain Caveman ===
This segment served as a prequel to the earlier series Captain Caveman and the Teen Angels, focusing on Captain Caveman's time in Bedrock before he was frozen in ice. Captain Caveman (under his "secret identity" of mild-mannered copy boy Chester), Betty and Wilma work for their editor-in-chief Lou Granite (based on Lou Grant) at The Daily Granite. To disguise himself as Chester, Captain Caveman wore a pair of glasses and a tie (similar to the Clark Kent persona used by Superman). Despite the simplicity of his disguise, he required a coat rack and an elaborate transformation sequence to become Captain Caveman.

Season 1 (1980–81)

No. overall	No. in season	Title	Original release date
1	1	"Clownfoot"	November 22, 1980
The villainous Clownfoot and his strongman henchman Samson join forces to rob the First Bank of Bedrock.
2	2	"The Masquerader"	November 29, 1980
The Masquerader steals paintings from the Vanderslate Art Museum disguised as Captain Caveman.
3	3	"The Animal Master"	December 6, 1980
Tigra the Animal Master uses her magical flute to transform the local animal population into an army ready to do her bidding.
4	4	"The Mole"	December 13, 1980
The villainous Mole has caused half of Bedrock to disappear, and Wilma and Betty are sent to investigate the earthquake.
5	5	"Rollerman"	December 20, 1980
Rollerman commits robberies on roller skates and is so fast that even Captain Caveman has a difficult time stopping him.
6	6	"Vulcan"	December 27, 1980
The evil Vulcan uses a volcano to destroy the city of Bedrock unless the mayor accedes to his ransom request.
7	7	"Punk Rock"	January 3, 1981
Punk Rock, a rock and roll criminal who creates terrible sounds with a guitar, kidnaps Betty so she can be his groupie.
8	8	"Braino"	January 10, 1981
The villainous Braino steals all of Bedrock's power and kidnaps reporters Wilma and Betty.
9	9	"The Incredible Hunk"	January 17, 1981
The Incredible Hunk from Sinister Swamp kidnaps Wilma and departs for Bedrock on a mission of destruction.
10	10	"Iceman"	January 24, 1981
Iceman and his sidekick Snow Bunny are freezing all of Bedrock in order to steal every diamond in town.
11	11	"The Mummy's Worse"	January 31, 1981
An ancient mummy intent on reclaiming his treasures traps Captain Caveman and Wilma in the Bedrock Historical Museum.

Season 2 (1981)

No. overall	No. in season	Title	Original release date
12	1	"Pinkbeard"	September 12, 1981
Pinkbeard the pirate threatens to feed Wilma and Betty to the sharks and hijack the Queen Elizarock luxury ship.
13	2	"The Blimp"	September 19, 1981
The Blimp kidnaps an assortment of famous people and brings them aboard his aircraft by using his celebrity vacuum.
14	3	"Futuro"	September 26, 1981
The wicked Futuro wreaks havoc in Bedrock and sends Wilma and Betty to the Moon on a rocket.
15	4	"Mr. Big"	October 3, 1981
Mr. Big runs rampant in Bedrock and Captain Caveman must save Wilma, Betty and the Daily Granite from destruction.
16	5	"Stormfront and Weathergirl"	October 10, 1981
Stormfront and Weathergirl break into the Roxagon to steal the top secret plans for a weather satellite.
17	6	"Crypto"	October 17, 1981
The evil Crypto, a monument robber, plans to steal the stone faces off Bedrock's Mount Rockmore.
18	7	"Presto"	October 24, 1981
Presto the sorcerer escapes from Bedrock Prison and seeks revenge on Wilma, Betty and Captain Caveman.

=== Dino and Cavemouse ===
The segment featured Dino pitted against a pesky little Cavemouse in chase sequences similar to Tom and Jerry. These sequences were story edited and the character of Cavemouse was developed by notable animation director Tex Avery, the last project he worked on before his death. Two segments aired per episode.

Season 1 (1980–81)

No. overall	No. in season	Title	Original release date
1	1	"Mouse Cleaning"	November 22, 1980
Fred buys a new home computer that will hopefully help solve his problems with the Cavemouse.
2	2	"Quiet Please!"	November 22, 1980
Dino is allowed to stay in the house overnight, providing he remains quiet, but the Cavemouse makes it difficult for him.
3	3	"Camp-Out Mouse"	November 29, 1980
Fred takes Dino on a camping trip to get away from the Cavemouse, but the pesky rodent follows them.
4	4	"Piece O'Cake"	November 29, 1980
Fred bakes a surprise birthday cake for Barney and assigns Dino to guard it from the Cavemouse.
5	5	"Beach Party"	December 6, 1980
Fred and Dino try to enjoy a fun day at the beach, but the pesky Cavemouse keeps spoiling their fun.
6	6	"Ghost Mouse"	December 6, 1980
When Dino destroys a toy mouse, the Cavemouse dunks himself in flour to frighten Dino into believing he is a ghost.
7	7	"Disco Dino"	December 13, 1980
The Cavemouse disrupts Dino's sleep with wild disco music and Dino attempts to stop him while on roller skates.
8	8	"Going Ape"	December 13, 1980
An escaped white gorillasaurus finds refuge in the Flintstone house and befriends the Cavemouse.
9	9	"Finger Lick'N Bad"	December 20, 1980
When Dino is left alone in the house, the Cavemouse uses the Flintstones' food supplies to outsmart him.
10	10	"Wet Paint"	December 20, 1980
Fred's plans to win the Bedrock Home Beautiful contest go awry when Dino and the Cavemouse play in the paint.
11	11	"Flying Mouse"	December 27, 1980
Fred instructs Dino to guard the picnic basket, but Dino fails in his duties when the Cavemouse arrives.
12	12	"Rocko Socko"	December 27, 1980
Fred purchases Rocko Socko, a robot programmed to get rid of all pests and freeloaders, to eliminate the Cavemouse.
13	13	"Aloha Mouse"	January 3, 1981
Fred, Wilma and Dino take a cruise to Hawaii and enjoy the voyage, until the Cavemouse appears.
14	14	"Arcade Antics"	January 3, 1981
Dino and the Cavemouse play on the amusement machines while on night watch at a penny arcade and also encounter a burglar.
15	15	"Come Home, Dino"	January 10, 1981
The Cavemouse removes Dino's license tag from his neck and sends him to the animal shelter, but soon gets a guilty conscience.
16	16	"Robin Mouse"	January 10, 1981
While Fred and Dino go fishing on Lake Sherwood, the Cavemouse meets with rodent hero Robin Mouse.
17	17	"A Fool for Pool"	January 17, 1981
Dino chases the Cavemouse through the pockets of Fred's new pool table, ruining it.
18	18	"L'il Orphan Alphie"	January 17, 1981
Alphie Mouse arrives at the Flintstone house, playing the poor orphan who desperately needs something to eat.
19	19	"Abra-Ca-Dino"	January 24, 1981
Fred demonstrates his new magic kit to Dino, but after Fred leaves, Dino uses the magic tricks on the Cavemouse.
20	20	"The Bedrock 500"	January 24, 1981
Dino and the Cavemouse compete against each other in the Bedrock 500 automobile race.
21	21	"Who is What?"	January 31, 1981
Fred disguises himself in a Dino costume to confuse the Cavemouse, but the Cavemouse convinces Dino to turn the tables on Fred.
22	22	"Pow-Pow the Dyno-Mite"	January 31, 1981
Dino is visited by his second cousin Pow-Pow who wants to help him capture the Cavemouse.

Season 2 (1981)

No. overall	No. in season	Title	Original release date
23	1	"Goofed-Up Golf"	September 12, 1981
Dino and the Cavemouse chase each other around the golf course, while Fred attempts to win a golf contest.
24	2	"Sleepy Time Mouse"	September 12, 1981
Dino wants to get a good night's sleep, but the pesky Cavemouse keeps him awake all night.
25	3	"S'No Place Like Home"	September 19, 1981
Fred takes Dino skiing and, naturally, the Cavemouse accompanies them and complicates matters on the ski slope.
26	4	"Super-Dupes"	September 19, 1981
Dino and the Cavemouse each summon their favorite superheroes to aid them in their endless feud.
27	5	"Dinner for Two"	September 26, 1981
Dino frees the Cavemouse from a locked box so that the rodent can enjoy a romantic evening with his girlfriend.
28	6	"Invasion of the Cheese Snatchers"	September 26, 1981
After his spacecraft runs out of fuel, an alien space mouse invades the Flintstone house.
29	7	"Handle with Scare"	October 3, 1981
The Cavemouse pretends to be an explosive red robot mouse that escaped from a laboratory to trick Dino and Fred.
30	8	"The World's Strongest Mouse"	October 3, 1981
The Cavemouse becomes the strongest mouse in the world with the help of a relaxation technique.
31	9	"Bat's All"	October 10, 1981
With the help of a tiny lost vampire mouse, the Cavemouse outwits Dino and consumes all the food in Fred's kitchen.
32	10	"Trick or Treat"	October 10, 1981
On Halloween, Dino and the Cavemouse fight over the candy while trick or treating.
33	11	"Do or Diet"	October 17, 1981
After Fred locks up his diet food, a robber empties the refrigerator, but the Cavemouse outwits him and saves Fred's food.
34	12	"Mouse for Sale"	October 17, 1981
Fred and Dino sell the Cavemouse to a laboratory, but the plan backfires when they are caught in the lab's electrical current.
35	13	"Maltcheese Falcon"	October 24, 1981
The Cavemouse assumes the guise of a gangster, Shnooz, to trick Dino into relinquishing Fred's food.
36	14	"Invisible Mouse"	October 24, 1981
The Cavemouse gives Fred and Dino a chilling experience when he becomes invisible with Fred's invisibility spray.

=== The Frankenstones ===
This segment featured the Flintstones' neighbors The Frankenstones: Frank, his wife Hidea, their kooky daughter Atrocia, and their teenage son Freaky, who is friends with fellow teenager Pebbles Flintstone.

Season 1 (1980–81)

No. overall	No. in season	Title	Original release date
1	1	"Birthday Boy"	November 22, 1980
Freaky's birthday party is disrupted when Frank refuses to allow Pebbles to visit, but she arrives anyway – disguised as a witch.
2	2	"Potion Problem"	November 29, 1980
Atrocia creates a hate potion that Frank uses on Pebbles and Freaky to break up their friendship, but it has the opposite effect on Fred, much to Frank's dismay.
3	3	"A Night on the Town"	December 6, 1980
The Flintstones and the Frankenstones have a night on the town that soon turns into a disaster.
4	4	"Out of Their League"	December 13, 1980
When Fred and Frank become coaches of opposing baseball teams, Fred challenges Frank's team to a playoff.
5	5	"Clone for a Day"	December 20, 1980
Atrocia clones a "nice" Fred to keep Frank from losing his temper for one full day so he can collect his inheritance.
6	6	"A Stone is Born"	December 27, 1980
Fred appears in a live TV commercial at the same time that Frank repairs the blown fuses at the KROX-TV station.
7	7	"A Rocks-Pox on You"	January 3, 1981
When Frank contracts the contagious Rocks-Pox disease, the doctor quarantines him along with the Flintstones.
8	8	"The Luck Stops Here"	January 10, 1981
The Frankenstone home is chosen for a magazine's Awful Award, until Fred changes Frank's bad luck by causing him to break a mirror.
9	9	"The Monster of Invention"	January 17, 1981
Fred and Frank try to out-invent one another while competing for the grand prize at the Inventor's Fair.
10	10	"Rock and Rolling Frankenstones"	January 24, 1981
Frank becomes a superstar at a rock concert when audience members are enthralled by his smashing hot temper.
11	11	"Sand Doom"	January 31, 1981
By coincidence, the Flintstones and the Frankenstones win a vacation at the same beach resort.

Season 2 (1981)

No. overall	No. in season	Title	Original release date
12	1	"Pet Peeves"	September 12, 1981
Dino and Rockjaw want to become movie stars when famous movie producer Neander Thalberg holds a contest to discover new animal talent.
13	2	"The Charity Bizarre"	September 19, 1981
The Frankenstones open a carnival to prevent Officers Fred and Barney from foreclosing on their home on Sgt. Boulder's orders.
14	3	"Getting the Business"	September 26, 1981
When Fred and Frank are forced to go into the catering business together, their recipes gain the attention of the health inspector.
15	4	"Ugly Is Only Skin Deep"	October 3, 1981
When Wilma and Hidea are sick with the Dinosaur Flu, Fred and Frank take their places in the Bedrock Beauty Contest.
16	5	"Three Days of the Mastodon"	October 10, 1981
Fred and Frank's initiation rites into the Mastodon Lodge challenge them into playing practical jokes on each other.
17	6	"First Family Fiasco"	October 17, 1981
The Frankenstones and the Flintstones compete to win the coveted First Family of Bedrock award.
18	7	"House Wars"	October 24, 1981
When Hidea and Wilma leave to visit a distant relative, Fred and Frank wage a war to make each other move.

=== Wraparounds ===
There are also some wraparounds featuring the characters:

- One would involve some jokes regarding a scene they're in.
- Pebbles teaching the viewers a dance move as Fred performs it.
- Pebbles seeing what words come out of an unscrambled world.
- An arts and crafts project with the characters where the second part of it occurs after one of the cartoons.
- A workout with O.K. Simpstone.
- A guessing game that Fred Flintstone hosts involving a scrambled picture involving a historical figure or a fictional character that the other characters have to make guesses for after hearing the different clues about them.

== Voice cast ==
- Gay Autterson as Betty Rubble, Wiggy Rockstone
- Mel Blanc as Barney Rubble, Captain Caveman/Chester, Dino, Pterodactyl (in "R.V. Fever", "Clownfoot", "Sands of the Saharastone"), Turtle (in "Sands of the Saharastone"), Lizardsaurus #1 (in "Off the Beaten Track"), Lizardsaurus #2 (in "Off the Beaten Track"), Turtlesaurus (in "Gold Fever"), Igorstone (in "Monster Madness"), Joe (in "Bedlam on the Bedrock Express"), Herman (in "Vuclan"), Dragonasaurus (in "The Incredible Hunk", "Futuro"), Mr. Clods (in "Country Clubbed"), Doorman (in "Country Clubbed")
- Henry Corden as Fred Flintstone, Police Officer (in "Fred Goes Ape"), Stegosaurus (in "The Animal Master"), Max (in "Follow That Dogosaurus")
- Ruta Lee as Hidea Frankenstone
- Kenneth Mars as Lou Granite ("Captain Caveman" segment), Narrator ("Captain Caveman" segment), Mummy (in "The Mummy's Worse")
- Mitzi McCall as Penny Pillar
- Don Messick as Bad-Luck Schleprock
- Charles Nelson Reilly as Frank Frankenstone
- Paul Reubens as Freaky Frankenstone, Beaversaurus (in "Clone for a Day")
- Zelda Rubinstein as Atrocia Frankenstone
- Michael Sheehan as Bamm-Bamm Rubble, Punk Rock (in "Punk Rock")
- John Stephenson as Mr. Slate, Big Bronto Billy (in "The Ghost Sitters"), Sheik (in "Sands of the Saharastone"), Mr. Hardrock (in "Country Club Clods"), Robert (in "The Gourmet Dinner"), Sandy Granitebelt (in "The Great Bedrock Air Race"), Health Inspector (in "Getting the Business"), The Great Flintstoni (in "Fred's Big Top Flop"), The Grand Woolly Mammoth (in "Three Days of the Mastodon"), Brother Quartz (in "Three Days of the Mastodon")
- Russi Taylor as Pebbles Flintstone, Cavemouse ("Dino and Cavemouse" segments"), Cavemouse's Girlfriend (in "Dinner for Two"), Batmouse (in "Bat's All")
- Jean Vander Pyl as Wilma Flintstone, Mrs. Goldnugget (in "The Ghost Sitters"), Mrs. Boulder (in "Follow That Dogosaurus"), Mrs. Slate (in "The Gourmet Dinner"), Sinistra (in "A Night of Fright")
- Lennie Weinrib as Moonrock Crater, Sgt. Boulder, Big Louie (in "Off the Beaten Track"), Mr. Sandblaster (in "The Witch of the Wardrobe"), Boss (in "Follow That Dogosaurus"), Harry (in "Bedlam on the Bedrock Express"), Mr. Redbluff (in "Rockjaw Rides Again"), Hotwire Harry (in "Hot Air to Spare"), Robert Redrock (in "The Stand-In"), Mayor of Bedrock (in "Shore Thing"), Funrock (in "Monster Madness")
- Frank Welker as Shmoo, Rockjaw, George the Gorillasaurus (in "Fred Goes Ape"), Clownfoot (in "Clownfoot"), Babyface (in "Off the Beaten Track"), Bearasaurus (in "Gold Fever"), Cousin Gruesome (in "A Night on the Town"), Usher (in "A Night on the Town"), Mammoth (in "Bogged Down"), Wolfasaurus (in "Monster Madness"), Rocky James (in "Bedlam on the Rocky Express"), T.V. Screenstone (in "A Stone is Born"), Duckasaurus (in "Pretty Kitty"), Lloyd the Sabretooth Tiger (in "Pretty Kitty"), Rocco DeRocco (in "The Stand-In"), Gopher (in "The Stand-In"), Roller Robber (in "The Roller Robber"), Sparky Granite (in "Put Up Your Duke"), Announcer (in "Sand Doom"), Winnie the Wondersaurus (in "Pet Peeves"), Winnie the Wondersaurus' Mom (in "Pet Peeves"), Mr. Rockley (in "Fred's Big Top Flop"), Charlie (in "Barney and the Bandit")

=== Additional voices ===
- René Auberjonois as Red (in "Barney and the Bandit")
- Joe Baker
- Buster Jones as O.K. Simpstone (in "Fred's Last Resort" and wraparounds)
- Frank Nelson as Mr. Saltrock (in "Creature from the Rock Lagoon")
- Marilyn Schreffler as Weathergirl (in "Stormfront and Weathergirl")
- Lurene Tuttle
- Paul Winchell as Mole (in "The Mole"), Pterodactyl (in "The Mole"), Dr. Cronkrock (in "Be Patient, Fred"), Vulcan (in "Vulcan"), Braino (in "Braino"), Animal Control Officer (in "Come Home, Dino"), Robin Mouse (in "Robin Mouse"), Mr. Big (in "Mr. Big")
- Janet Waldo As Penelope Pitstop (in Appearance Cameo From Wacky Races)

== Repackage ==
The title card for the repackage series.

After ending its original time slot, The Flintstone Comedy Show was later repackaged as The Flintstone Funnies from September 18, 1982 to September 8, 1984, which consisted of reruns of the six segments (two and/or three segments aired per half-hour episode). The Flintstone Funnies is the final incarnation of The Flintstones that premiered on NBC.

== Later years ==
Reruns of "Dino and the Cavemouse" aired on the Disney Channel adaption of Wake, Rattle, and Roll. Several of the Captain Caveman segments were featured on the Chip and Pepper's Cartoon Madness, which was only seen during the Fall 1991 season on NBC (couple of the segments showed the bulldog caricatures of the identical twin hosts briefly during the narrations).
