= Betty Rubble =

Fictional character in The Flintstones

- The Flintstones character
- First appearance: "The Flagstones" (1959)
- Created by: William Hanna; Joseph Barbera
- Voiced by: June Foray (Pilot, 1959); Bea Benaderet (1960–1964); Gerry Johnson (1964–1966); Gay Autterson (1971–1981); B.J. Ward (1986–2002); Julie McWhirter Dees (1987); Grey DeLisle (2001–present); Nicole Byer (Bedrock)
- Portrayed by: Rosie O'Donnell (1994 film); Jane Krakowski (2000 film)

In-universe information
- Full name: Elizabeth Jean Rubble (née McBricker)
- Species: Cavewoman
- Gender: Female
- Occupation: Housewife; Newspaper reporter Caterer
- Family: Bradley "Brad" McBricker (brother); Jean McBricker (mother); Brick McBricker (father); Sissy [McBricker] Sandstone (sister)
- Spouse: Barney Rubble (husband)
- Children: Bamm-Bamm Rubble (adoptive son)
- Relatives: Marblehead Sandstone Sr. (brother-in-law); Marblehead Sandstone Jr. (nephew); Pebbles Flintstone (daughter-in-law); Roxy Rubble (granddaughter); Chip Rubble (grandson)

Betty Rubble is a fictional character in the television animated series The Flintstones and its spin-offs and live-action motion pictures. She is the black-haired wife of caveman Barney Rubble and the adoptive mother of Bamm-Bamm Rubble. Her best friend is her next-door neighbor Wilma Flintstone.

Betty lives in the fictional prehistoric town of Bedrock, a world where dinosaurs coexist with cavepeople and the cavepeople enjoy primitive versions of modern conveniences such as telephones, automobiles and washing machines. She speaks with a Midwestern accent.

Betty's personality was based on the stock character of the lead character's best friend's wife, commonly seen in 1950s television (other prominent examples including Trixie Norton of The Honeymooners, which by conflicting accounts was a major inspiration for The Flintstones, and Ethel Mertz of I Love Lucy). Much like Trixie or Ethel, Betty spent a lot of her time socializing with Wilma, and the two would often end up working together to bail their husbands out of whatever scheme of Fred's had landed them in trouble, sometimes scheming with each other.

== Character ==
Betty typically follows the lead of Barney or Wilma, so may appear to be the least developed character in the show. This lack of protagonism (her continuous presence almost becoming a backdrop for supporting characters Pebbles, Bamm-Bamm, and Dino) makes Betty less of the lead than the show's general concept might imply.

Occasions when Betty leads the action are extremely scarce: one episode centers around her working undercover as a gentle old lady to earn money for a present for Barney; in another, the plot focuses on her and Wilma's suspicions of Barney being involved with another woman (who turns out to be Fred in a disguise in order to attend a ball game free of charge).

In spite of this, Betty is portrayed as having a distinctly emotional marriage with Barney, which often includes pet names and more obvious affection than the dynamic and energetic interaction between Fred and Wilma.

== Biography ==
As a child, Betty lived with her parents, who ran a convenience store, and her older brother, Brad. She also has a married sister with a baby son named Marblehead Sandstone.

As young adults, Betty and Wilma were employed as cigarette girls/waitresses at a resort. There, they first met and fell in love with their future husbands, Fred and Barney. Eventually, Betty and Barney were married, presumably not long after Fred and Wilma.

Betty became a homemaker, keeping house with such prehistoric aids as a baby mammoth vacuum cleaner, pelican washing machine, and so forth. Betty, much like Wilma, also enjoyed volunteering for various charitable/women's organizations in Bedrock, shopping, and (occasionally) meeting the celebrities of their world, including "Stony Curtis", "Cary Granite", and "Ann-Margrock". Betty at one time also had a job working for an 'old lady' who turned out to be a young lady in disguise and who was using Betty to pass counterfeit money; this was the only episode centered principally around Betty. Despite her cheerful nature, she has occasions to be angry at Barney, and once used her stone purse to knock out crooks.

In the fourth season of the original series, Betty and Barney found an abandoned infant on their doorstep, by the name of "Bamm-Bamm." After a court battle for possession of Bamm-Bamm (in which the Rubbles faced the opposition's noted prehistoric lawyer "Perry Masonry"), the couple were allowed to adopt Bamm-Bamm. The Rubbles never had biological children. The story depicted Betty as despondent over their inability to conceive, which was a surprisingly serious topic for any cartoon. It is unknown if this was due to a medical reason or simply bad luck, though after adopting Bamm-Bamm they never tried again.

When Bamm-Bamm was a teenager, Betty gained employment as a reporter for one of Bedrock's newspapers, the Daily Granite (presumably a parody of the Daily Planet of Superman fame), under the editorial guidance of Lou Granite (presumably a parody of Lou Grant of the contemporaneous eponymous series, and formerly of The Mary Tyler Moore Show). While employed there, she shared various adventures with prehistoric superhero Captain Caveman, who (in a secret identity) also works for the newspaper.

Later still, after Bamm-Bamm grew up and left home, Betty started a successful catering business with her neighbor and friend Wilma, before becoming a grandmother to Bamm-Bamm's twin children, Chip and Roxy.

== Portrayal ==
June Foray voiced Betty in a 1959 Flintstones pilot titled The Flagstones, but Bea Benaderet was cast for the series and voiced Betty for the first four seasons before stepping down in 1964 (due to her scheduling conflicts with Petticoat Junction). Gerry Johnson took over the role for the last 2 seasons. B.J. Ward has since performed the role in later Flintstones media since 1986–2000. Grey DeLisle started voicing Betty in The Flintstones: On the Rocks and voiced her in The Flintstones & WWE: Stone Age SmackDown!. In The Flintstones: Welcome to Bedrock, Betty's voice was provided by Dina Monaco-Boland. In the scrapped series Bedrock, Betty was going to be voiced by Nicole Byer.

In the 1994 film, Betty was portrayed by Rosie O'Donnell, who reportedly won the role because she captured the high-pitched laugh at her audition. Jane Krakowski replaced O'Donnell in the 2000 prequel The Flintstones in Viva Rock Vegas, in which Betty's maiden name is "O'Shale".

== Animated media ==
=== Television shows ===
- The Flagstones (1959) (voiced by June Foray)
- The Flintstones (1960–1964) (voiced by Bea Benaderet)
- The Flintstones (1964–1966) (voiced by Gerry Johnson)
- The Pebbles and Bamm-Bamm Show (1971–1972) (voiced by Gay Autterson)
- The Flintstone Comedy Hour (1972–1974)
- Fred Flintstone and Friends (1977–1978)
- The New Fred and Barney Show (1979)
- Fred and Barney Meet the Thing (1979)
- Fred and Barney Meet the Shmoo (1979–1980)
- The Flintstone Comedy Show (1980–1982)
- The Flintstone Funnies (1982–1984)
- The Flintstone Kids (1986–1988) (voiced by B.J. Ward)
- The Rubbles (2002) (voiced by Grey DeLisle)
- Yabba Dabba Dinosaurs (2020)
- Bedrock (cancelled) (voiced by Nicole Byer)

=== Films and specials ===
- The Man Called Flintstone (1966)
- The Flintstones on Ice (1973)
- A Flintstone Christmas (1977)
- The Flintstones: Little Big League (1978)
- The Flintstones' New Neighbors (1980)
- The Flintstones Meet Rockula and Frankenstone (1980)
- The Flintstones: Fred's Final Fling (1980)
- The Flintstones: Wind-Up Wilma (1981)
- The Flintstones: Jogging Fever (1981)
- The Jetsons Meet the Flintstones (1987) (voiced by Julie McWhirter Dees)
- The Flintstone Kids' "Just Say No" Special (1988)
- A Yabba Dabba Doo Celebration: 50 Years of Hanna-Barbera (1989)
- I Yabba-Dabba Do! (1993)
- Hollyrock-a-Bye Baby (1993)
- A Flintstone Family Christmas (1993)
- The Flintstones (1994) (portrayed by Rosie O'Donnell)
- A Flintstones Christmas Carol (1994)
- The Flintstones in Viva Rock Vegas (2000) (portrayed by Jane Krakowski)
- The Flintstones: On the Rocks (2001) (voiced by Grey DeLisle)
- The Flintstones & WWE: Stone Age SmackDown! (2015)
- Space Jam: A New Legacy (2021)
