= The Pebbles and Bamm-Bamm Show =

U.S. animated television series (1971–72)

- Genre: Comedy
- Directed by: Charles A. Nichols (animation director); William Hanna; Joseph Barbera
- Voices of: Sally Struthers; Jay North; Mitzi McCall; Gay Hartwig; Carl Esser; Lennie Weinrib; Mel Blanc; Don Messick; Alan Reed; John Stephenson; Jean Vander Pyl
- Theme music composer: Hoyt Curtin; Ted Nichols
- Composers: Hoyt Curtin (musical director); Ted Nichols (musical director); Elliot Lawrence (music composed and conducted by); Lanny Meyers (music arranged by)
- Country of origin: United States
- Original language: English
- No. of seasons: 1
- No. of episodes: 16

Production
- Executive producers: William Hanna; Joseph Barbera
- Producers: Iwao Takamoto (creative producer/production design); William Hanna; Joseph Barbera
- Running time: 30 minutes
- Production companies: Hanna-Barbera Productions; Screen Gems

Original release
- Network: CBS
- Release: September 11, 1971 – January 1, 1972

Related
- The Flintstones; The Flintstone Comedy Hour

The Pebbles and Bamm-Bamm Show is an American animated television series produced by Hanna-Barbera Productions that originally aired for one season on CBS Saturday morning from September 11, 1971, to January 1, 1972. With an ensemble voice cast of Sally Struthers, Jay North, Mitzi McCall, Gay Hartwig, Carl Esser and Lennie Weinrib, the show follows teenage Pebbles Flintstone and Bamm-Bamm Rubble as they encounter problems growing up in the fictional town of Bedrock. The Pebbles and Bamm-Bamm Show is the first spin-off series of The Flintstones. For the 1972–73 season, the show was revamped as The Flintstone Comedy Hour, with more time given to the original Flintstones cast alongside both reruns and newly produced segments of Pebbles and Bamm-Bamm.

Similar to Hanna-Barbera's Josie and the Pussycats, it used contemporary rock music to attract more viewers. The 16 episodes have since had reruns broadcast on Boomerang often surrounded by interstitial cartoons and shorts. Critical responses were mixed. It has since been released on DVD as part of Warner Home Video's "Hanna-Barbera Classic Collection" on a two disc set.

== Overview ==
Set in the Stone Age, the series follows Pebbles and Bamm-Bamm as they face problems with growing up in the town of Bedrock. No longer toddlers, the two are now teenagers and begin dating each other. The show focuses on them attending Bedrock High School and also getting their first jobs. Together, Pebbles and Bamm-Bamm form a musical band called the Bedrock Rockers, which was considered an attempt to be the "Stone Age" version of the Archies by one critic. Unlike The Flintstones, it centers on the children of the family, rather than parents Fred and Wilma Flintstone, and Barney and Betty Rubble. These characters continue to appear in the series, albeit in reduced roles.

== Characters ==
=== Main characters ===
- Pebbles Flintstone (voiced by Sally Struthers) is Fred and Wilma's daughter, Bamm-Bamm's best friend/girlfriend, Barney and Betty's honorary niece and a beautiful, social teenager. Enthusiastic, well-meaning and kind-hearted, she often tries to help someone in trouble, but usually ends up getting herself and her friends into even bigger trouble. Like her father, her catchphrase was "Yabba-dabba-doozy!", which was appropriate as most of her schemes were indeed doozies. Much like The Flintstones, Pebbles's "trademark" ponytail was held in place with a bone in the show. When Struthers left the series in order to fulfill a role on the American sitcom All in the Family, actress Mickey Stevens took her place for "The Pebbles and Bamm-Bamm Show" segments on The Flintstone Comedy Hour.
- Bamm-Bamm Rubble (voiced by Jay North) is Barney and Betty's muscular, adopted son, Fred and Wilma's adopted nephew and Pebbles' best friend/boyfriend. This marked North's second role as a voice actor for Hanna-Barbera (outside of Arabian Knights; he also voice acted in DePatie-Freleng's Here Comes the Grump), having previously acted on series like Dennis the Menace, Wanted Dead or Alive and My Three Sons.
- Wiggy Rockstone (voiced by Gay Hartwig) is an astrology enthusiast who spoke in an operatic voice.
- Penny Pillar (voiced by Mitzi McCall) is the small intelligent friend of Pebbles who often worried about her weight.
- Moonrock Crater (voiced by Lennie Weinrib) is one of Pebbles and Bamm-Bamm's friends who is intelligent and enjoys inventing things, though they don't always work as intended.

=== Returning characters ===
- Fred Flintstone (voiced by Alan Reed) is the father of Pebbles.
- Wilma Flintstone (voiced by Jean Vander Pyl) is the mother of Pebbles.
- Barney Rubble (voiced by Mel Blanc) is the father of Bamm-Bamm.
- Betty Rubble (voiced by Gay Hartwig) is Wilma's best friend/neighbor, Bamm-Bamm's adopted mother, and Barney's wife.
- Mr. Slate (voiced by John Stephenson) is Fred's boss.

=== Other characters ===
- Woolly (vocal effects provided by Mel Blanc) is a Pebbles' pet baby woolly mammoth.
- Snoots (voiced by Mel Blanc) is Bamm-Bamm's pet Dronkosaurus who mostly quotes "Ronk Ronk".
- Schleprock (voiced by Don Messick) is a gloomy student who is known for his bad luck which causes harm to the other characters.
- Fabian Fabquartz (voiced by Carl Esser) is a spoiled male teenager and a nemesis of Pebbles and Bamm-Bamm.
- Cindy Curbstone (voiced by Gay Hartwig) is a spoiled female teenager who had a crush on Bamm-Bamm and nemesis of Pebbles.
- The Bronto Bunch are a teenage biker quad who are frenemies with Pebbles and Bamm-Bamm. When antagonistic towards others, they generally do it in a non-threatening way.
  - Bruno Bronto (voiced by Lennie Weinrib) is the leader of the Bronto Bunch.
  - Noodles (voiced by John Stephenson) is the tall, stout, and long-necked second-in-command of the Bronto Bunch.
  - Stub (voiced by Mel Blanc) is a short member of the Bronto Bunch with a red afro.
  - Zonk (voiced by Mel Blanc) is the tall and obese dumb muscle of the Bronto Bunch with hair over his eyes.

== Production and continuation ==
The Pebbles and Bamm-Bamm Show was the first spin-off TV series derived from The Flintstones, following the theatrical film The Man Called Flintstone in 1966. Joe Ruby and Ken Spears, creators of Scooby-Doo, Where are You!, served as story editors on Pebbles and Bamm-Bamm, and several individuals wrote episodes for the series, including Joel Kane, Woody Kling, and Howard Morganstern. Executive produced by William Hanna and Joseph Barbera, Charles A. Nichols served as the director and Iwao Takamoto was the creative producer and key character designer. The main title theme and musical directors for The Pebbles and Bamm-Bamm Show were made by Hoyt Curtin and Ted Nichols. Elliot Lawrence wrote songs for the series, with music arrangements by Lanny Meyers. The songs were recorded by Regent Sound Studios.

Author Christopher P. Lehman wrote that the success of The Pebbles and Bamm-Bamm Show inspired Hanna-Barbera to create The Flintstone Comedy Hour in 1972. It combined previously broadcast episodes alongside new cartoons and shorts. Serving as a continuation, the new series featured newly-produced vignette versions of The Pebbles & Bamm-Bamm Show, as well as reruns from the 1971–72 season, during each of its sixteen episodes. The Flintstone Comedy Hour also included musical interludes performed by The Bedrock Rockers, similar to the original series. Fred Flintstone and Friends (1977), a later anthology series compiled for syndication, included reruns of segments from both The Pebbles and Bamm-Bamm Show and The Flintstone Comedy Hour.

The Pebbles and Bamm-Bamm Show was one of the last shows to use Hanna-Barbera's limited laugh track, as they stopped using a full laugh track provided by Charley Douglass by the fall of 1971.

== Episodes ==
No.	Title	Original release date
1	"Gridiron Girl Trouble"	September 11, 1971
Bamm-Bamm's pet Dronkasaurus Snoots is disguised in order to hide from a dogcatcher. However, the disguise causes both Pebbles and Bamm-Bamm trouble at their high school.
2	"Putty in Her Hands"	September 18, 1971
After being offered free art lessons at a local school from a con artist, Pebbles vows to prove her artistic abilities with the assistance of Bamm-Bamm to spite her rival Cindy.
3	"Frog for a Day"	September 25, 1971
In an attempt to learn about witchcraft, Pebbles believes she's accidentally turned Barney into a frog, requiring the help of an actual witch to turn him back into a human.
4	"The Golden Voice"	October 2, 1971
Pebbles hears Bamm-Bamm singing in the shower and recognizes his talent. However, Bamm-Bamm finds difficulty singing live when he is brought into Pebbles's band as the lead singer. Though this proves to be a trouble due to his stage fright and interference by the Bronto Bunch as Colonel Starrock sees the talent show.
5	"Daddy's Little Helper"	October 9, 1971
Fred's boss Mr. Slate hires Pebbles as a new employee. However, Pebbles misinterprets a conversation with an important individual, which risks Fred's future in the company altogether.
6	"Focus Foolery"	October 16, 1971
In order to remain unnoticed during a bank robbery, Bamm-Bamm dresses up as an infant. Meanwhile, Pebbles enters Bamm-Bamm into a toddler pageant contest with the hopes of beating Cindy.
7	"Pebbles' Big Boast"	October 23, 1971
Pebbles lies to Cindy, claiming that she is friends with the members of a popular rock band called the Rolling Boulders with Mick Jadestone. In order to prove her popularity, Pebbles wants to track down the band and get them to perform for her friends.
8	"The Grand Prix Pebbles"	October 30, 1971
Because of several misfortunes on Fred and Barney's behalf, Pebbles and Bamm-Bamm must fill in for their fathers during the Bedrock Grand Prix racing competition where Fred and Barney want to show off their new racing formula to Mr. Gettystone.
9	"The Terrible Snorkosaurus"	November 6, 1971
Pebbles tracks down a Snorkosaurus in order to receive $1,000 from a local aquarium. However, the aquarium dislikes the animal so Pebbles is forced to hide the Snorkosaurus in her parents' swimming pool. Things get complicated when Fred holds a pool party with Mr. Slate in attendance.
10	"Schleprock's New Image"	November 13, 1971
In an effort to help Schleprock and his continual experiences with bad luck, Pebbles, Bamm-Bamm and their friends accidentally become trapped in an underground mine shaft.
11	"Coach Pebbles"	November 20, 1971
Despite being unfamiliar with the rules of baseball, Pebbles becomes the new coach of a local baseball team, replacing a laryngitic Fred. Upset, Bamm-Bamm and Moonrock persuade Fred to remain as the coach.
12	"No Cash and Carry"	November 27, 1971
Pebbles begins working at Gimbelstone's department store and is tricked by a phony security guard into robbing the store. After realizing the situation, Pebbles and her friends must undo the damage she has caused.
13	"Wooly the Great"	December 4, 1971
Pebbles's pet woolly mammoth Wooly learns how to fly after testing out a magical shampoo. Wooly abuses his powers and causes everyone to get mad at him, so he runs away and joins a local traveling circus.
14	"Mayor May Not"	December 11, 1971
Pebbles serves Bedrock as an honorary mayor for a week, so she decides to improve the town to the best of her capabilities. Because of this, all of the city's workers decide to leave their jobs, which causes ruckus and mayhem. Her family, friends, and the Bronto Bunch work together to help her out.
15	"They Went That-A-Way"	December 18, 1971
As a favor, Pebbles promises to look after her uncle's ranch while he is away on vacation. However, she mistakenly hires cattle rustlers who rob her uncle of his prized animals.
16	"The Birthday Present"	January 1, 1972
Wooly steals Pebbles's birthday present that she bought for Wilma and buries it in the backyard, leaving Pebbles in a panic. Pebbles wrongfully blames her neighbor Mrs. Gruesome for the crime, which also disrupts a family reunion that the Gruesomes are throwing on their boat. Things get complicated when a local mistakes Bamm-Bamm's disguise as the actual cat burglar Creepasaurus.

== Reception ==
=== Broadcast history ===
The Pebbles and Bamm-Bamm Show was broadcast on CBS as part of their Saturday morning children's lineup between September 11, 1971, and January 1, 1972. Reruns of the series would later air again during 1975 and 1976.

The reruns of The Pebbles and Bamm-Bamm Show were incorporated into the 1972 hour-long show The Flintstone Comedy Hour as the second half-hour of the show. When the Comedy Hour first started airing, four new Pebbles and Bamm-Bamm cartoons were produced for this position, but episodes were now shortened to two 11-minute segments in one 30-minute episode. After a few weeks, the new episodes stopped and the reruns of the original series began. Those new episodes were included in The Pebbles and Bamm-Bamm Show DVD as bonus episodes. The noticeable difference is Mickey Stevens as Pebbles' voice in the new episodes, concurrent with Stevens' voice appearing as Pebbles anytime Pebbles is seen in the shorter cartoons that comprised the first half of The Flintstone Comedy Hour.

Boomerang has broadcast The Pebbles and Bamm-Bamm Show on several occasions since its initial launch in 2000. Reruns on the network would occasionally air alongside interstitial cartoons, such as Barney Bear's The Unwelcome Guest or Tex Avery's Hound Hunters for example. As part of the Warner Bros. Family Entertainment and Warner Bros. Television Distribution's "Hanna-Barbera Classic Collection", the complete series was made available on DVD as a two-disc set.

As of 2024, the show is rerunning on and off on MeTV Toons.

=== Critical reception ===
Author Derek Tait wrote in his book 1970s Childhood: From Bell-Bottoms to Disco Dancing that the cartoon was one of the popular Hanna-Barbera productions of the 1970s. In a retrospective view of older cartoons, the staff at MeTV included the show on their list of "15 Forgotten Cartoons from the Early 1970s You Used to Love". Regarding the musical aspects, Tom and Sara Pendergast felt that both The Pebbles and Bamm-Bamm Show and Josie and the Pussycats incorporated contemporary rock music to attract a larger audience. On The Christian Science Monitor's list of "the five dumbest moments" of The Flintstones, writer Chris Gaylord listed the series at number two. He called it "the most curious" of the various spin-offs and wrote, "Mercifully, these misadventures at Bedrock High School only lasted one season".
