= Gay Autterson =

American voice actress

- Born: Caldwell County, Texas, U.S.
- Occupation: Voice actress
- Years active: 1971–1985
- Notable credit: Betty Rubble (1971–1981)
- Spouse: Charles Autterson

Gay Autterson is an American retired voice actress who has done voice-overs for animated television series by Hanna-Barbera. She is mostly known as the voice of Betty Rubble for several of The Flintstones spin-off series and specials throughout the 1970s and early 1980s such as The Pebbles and Bamm-Bamm Show, The Flintstone Comedy Hour, The New Fred and Barney Show and The Flintstone Comedy Show.

== Filmography ==
Year	Title	Voice Role	Notes
1971–72	The Pebbles and Bamm-Bamm Show	Betty Rubble, Wiggy, Cindy	
1972–74	The Flintstone Comedy Hour	Betty Rubble, Wiggy, Cindy	
1973	The Flintstones on Ice	Betty Rubble	TV special
1973	Jeannie	Additional voices	
1976	Jabberjaw	Additional voices	
1977	CB Bears	Additional voices	
1977–78	Fred Flintstone and Friends	Betty Rubble, Wiggy, Cindy	
1977	A Flintstone Christmas	Betty Rubble	TV special
1978	The Flintstones: Little Big League	Betty Rubble	TV special
1979	The New Fred and Barney Show	Betty Rubble	
1979	Fred and Barney Meet the Thing	Betty Rubble	
1979–80	Fred and Barney Meet the Shmoo	Betty Rubble	
1980	The Flintstones' New Neighbors	Betty Rubble	TV special
1980	The Flintstones Meet Rockula and Frankenstone	Betty Rubble	TV special
1980	The Flintstones: Fred's Final Fling	Betty Rubble	TV special
1980–81	The Flintstone Comedy Show	Betty Rubble, Wiggy	
1981	The Flintstones: Wind-Up Wilma	Betty Rubble, Traffic Cop	TV special
1981	The Flintstones: Jogging Fever	Betty Rubble	TV special
1982–84	The Flintstone Funnies	Betty Rubble, Wiggy	Reruns of The Flintstone Comedy Show
1985	The Jetsons	Additional voices	Episode: "Elroy in Wonderland"
1985	The 13 Ghosts of Scooby-Doo	Wanda Brewski	Episode: "When You Witch Upon a Star"
