= Pebbles Flintstone =

Fictional character in The Flintstones

- The Flintstones character
- Pebbles Flintstone as a baby
- First appearance: "The Blessed Event"; The Flintstones; February 22, 1963
- Created by: Hanna-Barbera
- Voiced by: Baby; Jean Vander Pyl (1963–1994); Rebecca Page (1965); Lucille Bliss (Strong Kids, Safe Kids); Robyn Moore (Green's commercials); Russi Taylor (1993–2019); Aria Curzon (Cave Kids); Tress MacNeille (Harvey Birdman, Attorney at Law); Child; Jean Vander Pyl (A Flintstone Christmas); Pamela Anderson (The Flintstones: Little Big League); Jessica DiCicco (Yabba-Dabba Dinosaurs); Teenager; Sally Struthers (1971–1972); Mickey Stevens (1972); Janet Waldo (1976; Hanna-Barbera Educational Filmstrips); Patricia Parris (1979, 1980, 1982; Hanna-Barbera Educational Filmstrips); Russi Taylor (1980–2019); Grey DeLisle (Johnny Bravo); Adult; Megan Mullally (I Yabba-Dabba Do! and A Flintstone Family Christmas); Kath Soucie (Hollyrock-a-Bye Baby); Elizabeth Banks (Bedrock)
- Portrayed by: Elaine Silver & Melanie Silver (1994 film)

In-universe information
- Full name: Pebbles Wilma Flintstone-Rubble
- Species: Cavewoman
- Gender: Female
- Occupation: Advertising agency executive (I Yabba-Dabba Do!)
- Family: Fred Flintstone (father); Wilma Flintstone (mother); Ed Flintstone (paternal grandfather); Edna Flintstone (paternal grandmother); Pearl Slaghoople (maternal grandmother); Ricky Slaghoople (maternal grandfather); Mica Slaghoople (maternal aunt); Mickey Slaghoople (maternal aunt); Jerry Slaghoople (maternal uncle); Barney Rubble (father-in-law); Betty Rubble (mother-in-law); Stoney Flintstone (adoptive brother; A Flintstone Family Christmas)
- Spouse: Bamm-Bamm Rubble (husband)
- Children: Roxy Rubble (daughter; Hollyrock-a-Bye Baby); Chip Rubble (son; Hollyrock-a-Bye Baby)

Pebbles Flintstone is a fictional character in the Flintstones franchise. The red-haired daughter of Fred and Wilma Flintstone, Pebbles was born near the end of the third season. She is most famous in her infant form on The Flintstones, but has also appeared at various other ages, including as a teenager on the early 1970s spin-off The Pebbles and Bamm-Bamm Show and as an adult in three television films. She spent most of her time with Bamm-Bamm Rubble, her childhood best friend whom she eventually marries.

== Fictional character biography ==
According to the February 22, 1963, edition of TV Guide, Pebbles was born at the Bedrock Rockapedic Hospital on February 22, 10,000 BC. That particular year was never actually cited within the show itself; most versions of the show put the Flintstones' era as around 1,000,000 BC.

As an infant, Pebbles quickly became lifelong best friends with her next-door neighbor, Bamm-Bamm Rubble.

As a pre-teen, Pebbles was an excellent baseball player, which led to a misadventure involving her father, as seen in the 1978 primetime special The Flintstones: Little Big League.

By the time she was a teenager, Pebbles began dating Bamm-Bamm and was noted for getting their friends into various misadventures, mostly due to sharing her dad's penchant for schemes that would inevitably backfire (such as causing a strike by Bedrock's city employees when she was elected honorary mayor for a week). She and her friends attended Bedrock High School; Pebbles had a catchphrase similar to her father's: "Yabba-Dabba-Doozie!"

As an adult, Pebbles pursued a career in advertising and married Bamm-Bamm. After this, the newly married couple moved to Hollyrock, a fictional, prehistoric version of Hollywood, California. They had a son named Chip and a daughter named Roxy, who were fraternal twins.

== Chronology ==
Throughout the different iterations of the Flintstones series, Pebbles' age has varied significantly, depicted as an adolescent in one spin-off and reverting to an infant in the next. Listed approximately in order of release, Pebbles has appeared in the following Flintstones incarnations:

=== Infant/toddler ===
- The Flintstones
- The Man Called Flintstone
- The New Fred and Barney Show
- The Flintstones' New Neighbors
- The Flintstones: Fred's Final Fling
- The Flintstones: Wind-Up Wilma
- The Flintstones: Jogging Fever
- A Flintstones Christmas Carol
- Cave Kids

=== Child/preteen ===
- A Flintstone Christmas
- The Flintstones: Little Big League
- The Flintstones Movie (live-action)
- Yabba Dabba Dinosaurs

=== Teenager ===
- The Pebbles and Bamm-Bamm Show
- The Flintstone Comedy Hour
- Hanna-Barbera Educational Filmstrips – featuring Information Please, A Weighty Problem, Fire Alarm, Fire Escape and Driving Guide
- The Flintstone Comedy Show
- The Flintstone Funnies

=== Adult ===
- I Yabba-Dabba Do!
- Hollyrock-a-Bye Baby
- A Flintstone Family Christmas

== Character marketing ==
In 1963, when Hanna-Barbera decided to add a baby to the show, their first choice was a boy named Fred Junior. When Ideal Toy Company heard this, company executives approached Hanna-Barbera with a proposal to change the baby character to a girl for which the toymaker could create a doll, and Hanna-Barbera agreed.

Pebbles, in her conventional toddler incarnation, is sometimes seen in the various Post Fruity Pebbles and Cocoa Pebbles cereal commercials that have been produced over the years. Pebbles also appears on the packages of "Flintstones" children's vitamins and with Bamm-Bamm on the packages of "Flintstones" toddler vitamins, which are manufactured by Bayer Healthcare (formerly Miles Laboratories).

== Portrayal ==
- Infant Pebbles was voiced by Jean Vander Pyl, who also voiced her mother, Wilma.
- Pebbles has been voiced over the years by Sally Struthers, Mickey Stevens, Russi Taylor, Megan Mullally, Tress MacNeille, Kath Soucie, Pamela Anderson, Aria Curzon, Grey DeLisle, and Jessica DiCicco.
- Pebbles appeared in the 1994 live-action Flintstones movie, where she was played by twins Elaine and Melanie Silver.
- Pebbles appeared in the couch gag for The Simpsons episode "Kamp Krusty".
- Pebbles appeared in the I Am Weasel episode "I Am My Lifetime" as an old woman along with Hanna-Barbera elderly characters.
- Pebbles appeared in the Family Guy episode "Quagmire's Baby", during a police chase.
- Pebbles and Bamm-Bamm appeared in a cameo as background characters in the 2010 series Scooby-Doo! Mystery Incorporated, in the episode "Revenge of the Man Crab", portrayed as teenagers.
- Infant Pebbles and Bamm-Bamm have cameo appearances in the 2020 Animaniacs revival segment "Suffragette City".
- Pebbles and Bamm-Bamm make a cameo in the Looney Tunes film Space Jam: A New Legacy.
- Pebbles and Bamm-Bamm make a cameo in the Teen Titans Go! episode "Warner Bros. 100 Anniversary".
