= The Flintstones =

American animated television series

- Genre: Animated sitcom
- Created by: William Hanna; Joseph Barbera
- Developed by: William Hanna; Joseph Barbera
- Directed by: William Hanna; Joseph Barbera
- Voices of: Alan Reed; Jean Vander Pyl; Mel Blanc; Bea Benaderet; Gerry Johnson; Don Messick; John Stephenson; Verna Felton; Doug Young; June Foray; Howard Morris; Harvey Korman
- Theme music composer: Hoyt Curtin
- Opening theme: "Rise and Shine" (instrumental) (S1–3) "Meet the Flintstones" (S3–6)
- Ending theme: "Rise and Shine" (instrumental) (S1–3) "Meet the Flintstones" (S3–6) "Open Up Your Heart (and Let the Sunshine In)" (some episodes in S6)
- Composers: Hoyt Curtin; Ted Nichols (S6)
- Country of origin: United States
- Original language: English
- No. of seasons: 6
- No. of episodes: 166 (list of episodes)

Production
- Executive producers: William Hanna; Joseph Barbera
- Producers: William Hanna; Joseph Barbera
- Editors: Kenneth Spears (S1–3, 6); Donald A. Douglas (S1–3); Joseph Ruby (S1–3); Warner Leighton (S1–5); Greg Watson (S1–5)
- Running time: 25 minutes
- Production company: Hanna-Barbera Productions

Original release
- Network: ABC
- Release: September 30, 1960 – April 1, 1966

Related
- The Pebbles and Bamm-Bamm Show; Cave Kids (spin-off)

The Flintstones is an American animated sitcom by Hanna-Barbera Productions. It was originally broadcast on ABC from September 30, 1960, to April 1, 1966 as the first animated series with a prime-time slot on television, as well as the first animated sitcom. The series takes place in a romanticized Stone Age setting and follows the lives of the titular Fred and Wilma Flintstone and their pet dinosaur, Dino, along with the saber-toothed cat Baby Puss, and Fred and Wilma's eventual baby girl Pebbles. It also focuses on the Flintstones' neighbors and best friends Barney and Betty Rubble, and later their adopted baby boy Bamm-Bamm and pet hopparoo (kangaroo) Hoppy.

Producers William Hanna and Joseph Barbera, who had earned seven Academy Awards for Tom and Jerry, and their staff faced a challenge in developing a thirty-minute animated program with one storyline that fit the parameters of family-based domestic situation comedies of the era. After considering several settings and selecting the Stone Age, one of several inspirations was The Honeymooners (which was itself influenced by The Bickersons and Laurel and Hardy). Hanna considered The Honeymooners to be one of the finest comedies on television.

The enduring popularity of The Flintstones mainly comes from its juxtaposition of modern, everyday concerns with the Stone Age setting. Its animation required a balance of visual with verbal storytelling that the studio created and others imitated.

The Flintstones was the most financially successful and longest-running network animated television series for three decades. In 2013, TV Guide ranked The Flintstones the second greatest TV cartoon of all time, behind only The Simpsons.

== Overview ==
The Flintstones and the Rubbles riding in the Flintstones' car. From left to right: Dino, Wilma, Pebbles, Betty, Fred, Bamm-Bamm, Barney

The show is set in a comical, romanticized version of the Stone Age, with features and technologies that resemble mid-20th-century suburbia in the United States. The plots deliberately resemble the sitcoms of the era, with the caveman Flintstone and Rubble families getting into minor conflicts characteristic of modern life. The show is set in the Stone Age town of Bedrock (pop. 2,500), where dinosaurs and other prehistoric creatures are portrayed as co-existing with cavepeople, saber-toothed cats, woolly rhinoceroses, and woolly mammoths.

Animation historian Christopher P. Lehman considers that the series partly draws its humor from anachronism, mainly the placing of a "modern" 20th-century society in prehistory which takes inspiration from the suburban sprawl developed in the first two decades of the postwar period. This society has modern home appliances which work by employing animals. It also has automobiles, but they mostly do not resemble the cars of the 20th century, as they are large wooden and rock structures powered by people who run while inside them. This depiction varies according to the needs of the story; on some occasions, the cars appear to have engines, requiring ignition keys and some representation of gasoline. Fred might pull into a gas station and say, "Fill 'er up with Ethel", which is pumped through the trunk of a woolly mammoth marked "ETHEL". In addition, the stone houses of this society are cookie-cutter homes positioned into neighborhoods typical of mid-20th-century American suburbs.

== Characters ==
=== The Flintstones ===
- Fred Flintstone – The main character of the series and patriarch of the Flintstone family, who is easily angered but a loving husband and father. He is an operator at the Slate Rock and Gravel Company for a bronto-crane, a Brontosaurus used as an excavating machine, but is prone to accidents. He is also overweight and likes to eat copious amounts of unhealthy food. As well, he is good at bowling and is a member of the "Loyal Order of Water Buffaloes" Lodge No. 26, originally called the Loyal Order of Dinosaurs in Season 1, a men-only club which parallels fraternities such as the Loyal Order of Moose. His catchphrase is "Yabba Dabba Doo!", which is revealed in the first season to be the Lodge's official cheer.
- Wilma Flintstone – Fred's wife and Pebbles' mother, who is more intelligent and level headed than her husband. She often serves as a foil to Fred's behavior and is a loyal wife to him. However, she has a habit of spending money, with her and Betty's catchphrase being "Da-da-da duh da-da CHARGE it!!". She can also be jealous, as she becomes easily angered if another woman interacts with Fred.
- Pebbles Flintstone – The Flintstones' infant daughter who is born near the end of the third season. She normally wears a bone in her hair which holds it in a ponytail, and a light green and black shirt with a turquoise and black diaper. She, like her family, does not wear shoes or pants.
- Dino (pronounced "dee-no") – The Flintstones' pet dinosaur, who acts like a dog. A running gag in the series involves Fred coming home from work and Dino getting excited and knocking him down.
- Baby Puss – The Flintstones' pet saber-toothed cat, who is rarely seen in the series, but is seen throwing Fred out of the house during the end credits. This causes Fred to repeatedly pound on the front door and yell "Wilma!", waking the neighborhood in the process.

==== Relatives of the Flintstones ====
- Pearl Slaghoople – Wilma's hard-to-please mother, Fred's mother-in-law, and Pebbles' grandmother, who constantly disapproves of Fred and his behavior. They briefly reconcile in the episode "Mother-in-Law's Visit", until she learns that Fred suckered her out of money he needed to buy a baby crib for Pebbles. Their disastrous first meeting was recounted in a flashback in the episode "Bachelor Daze". Her surname was not revealed until the fourth season while her first name, "Pearl", was conceived after the original series ended in 1966.
- Uncle Tex Hardrock – Fred's maternal uncle, Wilma's uncle-in-law, and Pebbles' great-uncle, who is a member of the Texarock Rangers. He constantly holds Fred's future inheritance over his head.

=== The Rubbles ===
- Barney Rubble – Fred's best friend and next-door neighbor, who is nearly six inches (15 cm) shorter than him and also overweight. His occupation is unknown throughout most of the series, though later episodes depict him working in the same quarry as Fred. He shares many of Fred's interests, such as bowling and golf, and is also a member of the Loyal Order of Water Buffaloes. Though Fred and Barney frequently get into feuds with one another, usually due to Fred's short temper, they are still close friends.
- Betty Rubble – Barney's wife and Wilma's best friend, who like Wilma has a habit of spending money and is jealous of other women being around her husband.
- Bamm-Bamm Rubble – The Rubbles' abnormally strong son, whom they adopt during the fourth season. His name comes from the only phrase he speaks as a baby: "Bamm, Bamm!"
- Hoppy – The Rubbles' pet hopparoo, a hybrid of a kangaroo and a dinosaur whom they purchase at the beginning of the fifth season. When she arrives, Dino and Fred mistake her for a giant mouse and are frightened of her, but they eventually become best friends after Hoppy gets help when they are in an accident. She babysits the children as she takes them around in her pouch, which also serves as a shopping cart for Betty.

=== Other characters ===
Over 100 other characters appeared throughout the series. Below are those who have made more than one appearance:

- Mr. Nate Slate – Fred’s hot-tempered boss at the gravel pit, who fires him on several occasions only to give him his job back (and inevitably grant him a raise every time he requests one). A running gag is his ever-changing first name, which has been revealed to be Sylvester, Seymour, Nate, Oscar, and George throughout the series. In the episode "The Long, Long, Long Weekend", he is shown to be the founder of "Slate Rock and Gravel Company", which is still in business two million years later and operated by his descendant, "George Slate the Eighty-thousandth". In early episodes, the more recognized "Mr. Slate" character was known as "Mr. Rockhead" and was a supervisor of Fred, while Mr. Slate was a short character. Over time, the two switched identities and the shorter version of Mr. Slate was phased out.
- Arnold – The Flintstones' paperboy, whom Fred despises mainly because Arnold is frequently able to best and outsmart him and because he often throws the newspaper in his face. Arnold's parents are mentioned in the series, but his mother Doris, who is a friend of Wilma and Betty as shown in the episode "The Little Stranger", is referred to but never physically appears. Arnold's father appears in the episode "Take Me Out to the Ball Game", though his name is never mentioned.
- Joe Rockhead – A mutual friend of Fred and Barney, Fred usually mentions doing something with Joe when Fred and Barney have a falling out. Joe was, at some point, the fire chief of the Bedrock Volunteer Fire Department, as shown in the episode "Arthur Quarry's Dance Class". His appearance varied throughout the run of the series, but his appearance in the episode "The Picnic" was his most common appearance.
- Sam Slagheap – The Grand Poobah of the Water Buffalo Lodge.
- The Hatrocks – A family of hillbillies, who feuded with the Flintstones' Arkanstone branch similarly to the Hatfield–McCoy feud. Fred and Barney reignite a feud with them in "The Bedrock Hillbillies", when Fred inherits San Cemente from his late great-great-uncle Zeke Flintstone and they fight over who made Zeke's portrait. The Hatrocks later return in "The Hatrocks and the Gruesomes", where they bunk with the Flintstones during their trip to Bedrock World's Fair and their antics start to annoy them as they guilt-trip Fred into extending their stay. It is also revealed that they dislike bug music, and the Flintstones, the Rubbles, and the Gruesomes are able to drive them away by performing the Four Insects song "She Said Yeah Yeah Yeah". (Note: The name "The Four Insects" is clearly a play on the British band "The Beatles", then at the height of their fame. The song "She Said Yeah Yeah Yeah" is a play on The Beatles' "She Loves You".) After learning that the Bedrock World's Fair would feature the Four Insects performing, they fled back to Arkanstone.
  - Jethro Hatrock – The patriarch of the Hatrock Family. He had brown hair in "The Hatrocks and the Flintstones" and taupe-gray hair in "The Hatrocks and the Gruesomes".
  - Gravella Hatrock – Jethro's wife.
  - Zack Hatrock – Jethro and Gravella's oldest son.
  - Slab Hatrock – The youngest son of Jethro and Gravella.
  - Granny Hatrock – The mother of Jethro and grandmother of Zack and Slab.
  - Benji Hatrock – Jethro's son-in-law.
  - Percy – The Hatrock's pet dogasaurus.
- The Gruesomes – A creepy but friendly family, who move in next door to the Flintstones in later seasons.
  - Weirdly Gruesome – The patriarch of the Gruesome family, who works as a reality-show host.
  - Creepella Gruesome – Weirdly's tall wife.
  - Goblin "Gobby" Gruesome – Weirdly and Creepella's son.
  - Uncle Ghastly – The uncle of Gobby from Creepella's side of the family, who is mostly shown as a large furry hand with claws emerging from a door, a well, or a wall. His shadow was also seen in their debut episode. He wasn't named until his second appearance, which is also the only time he is heard speaking, as he is heard laughing from a well.
  - Occy – The Gruesome family's pet giant octopus.
  - Schneider – Gobby's pet giant spider.
- The Great Gazoo – An alien from the planet Zetox, who was exiled to Earth and appears in the final season. He helps Fred and Barney with his reality-warping abilities, often against their will. He is actually from the future and is quite dismayed after realizing he has been sent back to "the Stone Age". He can be seen only by Fred, Barney, Pebbles, Bamm-Bamm, other small children, Dino, and Hoppy.

== Voice cast ==
- Alan Reed – Fred Flintstone, Uncle Ghastly
- Jean Vander Pyl – Wilma Flintstone, Pebbles Flintstone
- Mel Blanc – Barney Rubble, Dino, Zack Hatrock
- Daws Butler – Barney Rubble (Season 2; episodes 1, 2, 5, 6 and 9 only)
- Bea Benaderet – Betty Rubble (Seasons 1–4), Gravella Hatrock
- Gerry Johnson – Betty Rubble (Seasons 5–6), Granny Hatrock (in "The Hatrocks and the Gruesomes")
- Don Messick – Bamm-Bamm Rubble, Hoppy, Arnold, Gobby Gruesome
- John Stephenson – Mr. Slate, Joe Rockhead, Sam Slagheap
- Verna Felton – Pearl Slaghoople (Note: Pearl Slaghoople wasn't named until later in Season 4 with her last name being revealed later in the same season.) (Seasons 2–3)
- Janet Waldo – Pearl Slaghoople (Seasons 4 and 6)
- Harvey Korman – The Great Gazoo (Season 6)

=== Guest stars ===
- Hoagy Carmichael – Himself (in "The Hit Songwriters")
- Tony Curtis – Stony Curtis (in "The Return of Stony Curtis")
- James Darren – James Darrock (in "Surfin’ Craze")
- Ann-Margret – Ann-Margrock (in "Ann-Margrock Presents")
- Elizabeth Montgomery – Samantha (in "Samantha")
- Jimmy O'Neill – Jimmy O’Neillstone (in "Shinrock-A-Go-Go")
- The Beau Brummels – The Beau Brummelstones (in "Shinrock-A-Go-Go")
- Willard Waterman – Gus Gravel (in "The Long Long Weekend")
- Dick York – Darrin (in "Samantha")

=== Additional voice cast ===
- Dick Beals
- Herschel Bernardi
- Lucille Bliss – Hugo (in "The Good Scout")
- Henry Corden
- Leo De Lyon
- Walker Edmiston – J. Montague Gypsum (in "This Is Your Lifesaver")
- June Foray – Granny Hatrock (in "The Bedrock Hillbillies")
- Paul Frees
- Sandra Gould
- Naomi Lewis – Creepella Gruesome
- Howard McNear – Doctor, appeared in 3 episodes
- Allan Melvin
- Howard Morris – Weirdly Gruesome, Schneider, Jethro Hatrock, Slab Hatrock, Percy
- Frank Nelson
- Mike Road
- Hal Smith
- Bill Thompson – Mister Slate (in "The Engagement Ring")
- Ginny Tyler
- Herb Vigran – Cop, appeared in 3 episodes
- Paula Winslowe
- Doug Young – Benji Hatrock

== Voice-actor details ==
Fred Flintstone physically resembles both the first voice actor who played him, Alan Reed, and Jackie Gleason, whose series, The Honeymooners, inspired The Flintstones. The voice of Barney Rubble was provided by voice actor Mel Blanc, except for five episodes during the second season (the first, second, fifth, sixth, and ninth); Hanna-Barbera regular Daws Butler filled in and provided the voice of Barney while Blanc was incapacitated by a near-fatal car accident in 1961. Blanc was able to return to the series sooner than expected because a temporary recording studio for the cast was set up at his bedside. Blanc's Barney voice varied from nasally to deep before the accident, as he and Barbera, who directed the sessions with Alan Dinehart, explored the right level in relation to comedy and other characters. Blanc uses both Barney voices in one of the earliest episodes, "The Prowler".

Reed was insistent on playing Fred in a relatively natural speaking voice, rather than a broad, "cartoony" style. Few animated short cartoons used this "straightforward" method, except for experimental studios like UPA and feature films with more realistic characters. The performances of Reed and the cast, combined with the writing, helped to ground the animated world of The Flintstones in a relatable reality. The dialogue style of The Flintstones set a precedent for acting in animation that continues to exist today, and is sometimes falsely attributed in modern animated productions as "revolutionary".

In a 1986 Playboy interview, Gleason said that Reed had done voice-overs for Gleason in his early movies, and that he had considered suing Hanna-Barbera for copying The Honeymooners, but decided to let it pass. According to Henry Corden, a voice actor and a friend of Gleason's (who would subsequently take over the role of Fred from Reed after his death in 1977), "Jackie's lawyers told him he could probably have The Flintstones pulled right off the air. But they also told him, 'Do you want to be known as the guy who yanked Fred Flintstone off the air? The guy who took away a show so many kids love and so many parents love, too?'"

Henry Corden first spoke for Fred Flintstone on the 1965 record album Songs From Mary Poppins, then continued doing the voice for most other Flintstone records on the label. Around the same time, Corden was providing Fred's singing voice in two films being produced at the studio: the 1966 special Alice in Wonderland, or What's a Nice Kid Like You Doing in a Place Like This? and the 1966 feature film The Man Called Flintstone. Corden assumed the role completely after Reed's death in 1977, starting with the TV special, A Flintstone Christmas.

Since 2000, Jeff Bergman, James Arnold Taylor, and Scott Innes, who performs both Fred and Barney for Toshiba commercials, have performed the voice of Fred. Since Mel Blanc's death in 1989, Barney has been voiced by Jeff Bergman, Frank Welker, Scott Innes, and Kevin Michael Richardson. Various additional character voices were performed by Hal Smith, Allan Melvin, Janet Waldo, Daws Butler, and Howard Morris, among others.

== Episodes ==
Season	Episodes	Originally released	
Season	Episodes	First released	Last released
Pilot		1959 (test screening); May 7, 1994 (on Cartoon Network)	
1	28	September 30, 1960	April 7, 1961
2	32	September 15, 1961	April 27, 1962
3	28	September 14, 1962	April 5, 1963
4	26	September 19, 1963	March 12, 1964
5	26	September 17, 1964	March 12, 1965
6	26	September 17, 1965	April 1, 1966

== Music ==
The opening and closing credits theme during the first two seasons was "Rise and Shine", a lively instrumental underscore accompanying Fred on his drive home from work. Starting in season three, episode three ("Barney the Invisible"), the opening and closing credits theme was "Meet the Flintstones". This version was recorded with a 22-piece big band conducted by composer Hoyt Curtin and performed by the Randy Van Horne Singers. The melody is derived from part of the 'B' section of Beethoven's Piano Sonata No. 17 Movement 2, composed in 1801/02. "Meet the Flintstones" was later used in the first two seasons in syndication. The musical underscores were credited to Hoyt Curtin for the show's first five seasons; Ted Nichols took over in 1965 for the final season. Many early episodes used the underscores composed for Top Cat and The Jetsons. Episodes of the last two seasons used the underscore of Jonny Quest for the more adventurous stories.

== History and production ==
The idea of The Flintstones started after Hanna-Barbera produced The Huckleberry Hound Show and The Quick Draw McGraw Show, which were successful. However, they did not appeal to a wide audience like their previous theatrical cartoon series Tom and Jerry, which entertained both children and adults. Since children did not need their parents' supervision to watch television, Hanna-Barbera's programs became labeled "kids only". Hanna and Barbera wanted to recapture the adult audience with an animated situation comedy.

Hanna and Barbera considered making the two families hillbillies (a theme that was later incorporated into two episodes, "The Bedrock Hillbillies" and "The Hatrocks and the Gruesomes"), ancient Romans (an idea which was later developed into The Roman Holidays), pilgrims, and Native Americans, before deciding on a Stone Age setting. According to Barbera, they settled on the Stone Age because "you could take anything that was current, and convert it to stone-age". Under the working title The Flagstones, a treatment was written by Harry Winkler. The family originally consisted of Fred, Wilma, and their son, Fred, Jr. A brief demonstration film was also created to sell the idea of a "modern stone-age family" to sponsors and the network.

It was a difficult sell, and required eight weeks of daily presentations to networks and ad agencies. June Foray and Hanna-Barbera regular Daws Butler voiced the characters for the demonstration film, but Foray was dropped without warning before production began; she was upset about the rejection and refused to work with Hanna-Barbera for many years afterward, despite Barbera's efforts to offer her other work. Animator Kenneth Muse, who worked on the Tom and Jerry cartoons, also worked on the early seasons of The Flintstones.

William Hanna was honest about the inspiration, saying, "At that time, The Honeymooners was the most popular show on the air, and for my bill, the funniest. The characters, I thought, were terrific. Now, that influenced greatly what we did with The Flintstones ... The Honeymooners was there, and we used that as a kind of basis for the concept." Joseph Barbera disavowed these claims in a separate interview, stating, "I don't remember mentioning The Honeymooners when I sold the show, but if people want to compare The Flintstones to The Honeymooners, then great. It's a total compliment. The Honeymooners was one of the greatest shows ever written."

Jackie Gleason, creator of The Honeymooners, considered suing Hanna-Barbera Productions, but decided not to since he did not want to be known as "the guy who yanked Fred Flintstone off the air". The Bickersons creator Philip Rapp settled out of court with Gleason over The Honeymooners' similarities to his show. Another influence was noted during Hanna-Barbera's tenure at MGM, where they were in a friendly competition with fellow cartoon director Tex Avery. In 1955, Avery directed a cartoon entitled The First Bad Man, narrated by cowboy legend Tex Ritter, which was about the rowdy antics of a bank robber in stone-age Dallas. Many sight gags from The First Bad Man antedated similar situations used by Hanna-Barbera in The Flintstones by many years. Therefore, students of American animation call The First Bad Man a progenitive seed of The Flintstones.

The concept was also antedated by the "Stone Age Cartoons", a series of 12 animated cartoons which Fleischer Studios released from January to September 1940. These cartoons show stone-age people doing modern things with primitive means, such as "Granite Hotel" including characters such as a newsboy, telephone operator, hotel clerk, and a spoof of Edgar Bergen and Charlie McCarthy.

Barbera explained that selling the show to a network and sponsors was not an easy task.

Here we were with a brand new thing that had never been done before, an animated prime-time television show. So we developed two storyboards; one was they had a helicopter of some kind and they went to the opera or whatever, and the other was Fred Flintstone and Barney Rubble fighting over a swimming pool. So I go back to New York with a portfolio and two half-hour boards. And no-one would even believe that you'd dare to suggest a thing like that, I mean they looked at you and they'd think you're crazy. But slowly the word got out, and I used the presentation which took almost an hour and a half. I would go to the other two boards and tell them what they did, and do all the voices and the sounds and so-on, and I'd stagger back to the hotel and I'd collapse. The phone would ring like crazy, like one time I did Bristol-Myers, the whole company was there. When I got through I'd go back to the hotel the phone would ring and say "the president wasn't at that meeting, could you come back and do it for him." So I had many of those, one time I had two agencies, they'd fill the room I mean God about 40 people, and I did this whole show. I got to know where the laughs were, and where to hit it, nothing; dead, dead, dead. So one of the people at Screen Gems said "This is the worst, those guys...." he was so angry at them. What it was, was that there were two agencies there, and neither one was going to let the other one know they were enjoying it. But I pitched it for eight straight weeks and nobody bought it. So after sitting in New York just wearing out, you know really wearing out. Pitch, pitch, pitch, sometimes five a day. So finally on the very last day I pitched it to ABC, which was a young daring network willing to try new things, and bought the show in 15 minutes. Thank goodness, because this was the very last day and if they hadn't bought it, I would have taken everything down, put it in the archives and never pitched it again. Sometimes I wake up in a cold-sweat thinking this is how close you get to disaster.

When the series entered production, the working title The Flagstones was changed, possibly to avoid confusion with the Flagstons, the main characters in the comic strip Hi and Lois. After spending a brief period in development as The Gladstones (GLadstone being a Los Angeles telephone exchange at the time), Hanna-Barbera settled upon The Flintstones, and the idea of the Flintstones having a child from the start was discarded, with Fred and Wilma starting out as a childless couple. However, some early Flintstones merchandise, such as a 1961 Little Golden Book, included "Fred Jr". Despite the animation and fantasy setting, the series was initially aimed at adult audiences. This was reflected in the comedy, which resembled the primetime sitcoms of the era, with family issues resolved at the end of each episode, as well as the inclusion of a laugh track. Hanna and Barbera hired many writers from live-action, including two of Jackie Gleason's writers, Herbert Finn and Sydney Zelinka, as well as relative newcomer Joanna Lee. However, they still used traditional animation writers, such as Warren Foster and Michael Maltese.

The Flintstones premiered on September 30, 1960, at 8:30 pm Eastern time, and quickly became a hit. It was the first American animated show to depict two people of the opposite sex (Fred and Wilma; Barney and Betty) sleeping together in one bed, although Fred and Wilma are sometimes depicted as sleeping in separate beds. The first live-action depiction of this in American TV history was in television's first sitcom: 1947's Mary Kay and Johnny.

Fred and Wilma advertising Winston cigarettes during the closing credits

The first two seasons were co-sponsored by Winston cigarettes and the characters appeared in several black-and-white television commercials for Winston. This was dictated by the custom, at that time, that the stars of a TV series often "pitched" their sponsor's product in an "integrated commercial" at the end of the episode.

During the third season, Hanna and Barbera decided that Fred and Wilma should have a baby. Originally, Hanna and Barbera intended for the Flintstone family to have a boy, but the head of the marketing department convinced them to change it to a girl since "girl dolls sell a lot better than boy dolls". Although most Flintstones episodes were stand-alone storylines, Hanna-Barbera created a story arc surrounding the birth of Pebbles. Beginning with the episode "The Surprise", aired midway through the third season, in which Wilma reveals her pregnancy to Fred, the arc continued through the time leading up to Pebbles's birth in the episode "Dress Rehearsal", and then continued with several episodes showing Fred and Wilma adjusting to parenthood. Around this time, Winston pulled out their sponsorship and Welch's grape juice and grape jellies became the primary sponsor, as the show's audience began to shift towards a younger demographic. The integrated commercials for Welch's products feature Pebbles asking for grape juice in her toddler dialect, and Fred explaining to Pebbles Welch's unique process for making the jelly, compared to the competition. Welch's also produced a line of grape jelly packaged in jars that were reusable as drinking glasses, with painted scenes featuring the Flintstones and other characters from the show. In Australia, a "Name the Flintstones' baby" competition was launched during the pregnancy episodes to engage Australian viewers, who lacked access to earlier U.S. airings. An American won the contest and received an all-expenses-paid trip to tour Hanna-Barbera Studios. Another arc occurred in the fourth season, in which the Rubbles, depressed over being unable to have children of their own, adopt Bamm-Bamm. This made The Flintstones the first animated series to address the issue of infertility, though subtly. The 100th episode made but the 90th to air, "Little Bamm-Bamm Rubble", established how Bamm-Bamm was adopted. Nine episodes were produced before it, but aired afterward, which is why Bamm-Bamm was not seen again until episode 101, "Daddies Anonymous". However, Bamm-Bamm did appear in a teaser in episode 98, "Kleptomaniac Pebbles". Another story arc, occurring in the final season, centered on Fred and Barney's dealings with the Great Gazoo.

After Pebbles's birth, the audience demographic expanded and the series was marketed as a family series rather than the "adult" animated show of the earlier seasons. As a result of a wider number of yearly viewers, including children, and competition from TV's trend toward fantasy shows, the episodes varied from family comedy to fantasy/adventure, but still had stories about couple dynamics. The last original episode was broadcast on April 1, 1966.

=== Broadcast history ===
Although The Flintstones was produced in color for its entire run, ABC broadcast the show only in black-and-white for the first two seasons. Beginning with the third season in 1962, ABC televised The Flintstones in color, making it one of the first programs in color to air on the network. The first three seasons of The Flintstones aired Friday nights at 8:30 Eastern time on ABC. Season four and part of season five aired Thursdays at 7:30, while the rest of the series aired Fridays at 7:30.

In the United States, The Flintstones was part of NBC Saturday mornings from 1966 to 1970, with syndicated reruns offered to local stations until 1997, when E/I regulations and changing tastes in the industry led to the show's move to cable television. From the time of Ted Turner's purchase of Hanna-Barbera in 1991, TBS, TNT, and Cartoon Network aired the program. In September 2003, the program moved to Boomerang, where it has continued to air regularly as of 2025 with some interruptions. Online, the series was made available on the In2TV service beginning in 2006, then the online version of Kids' WB until it was discontinued in 2015. As of 2017, full episodes are available in the United States on Boomerang's subscription video-on-demand service, with select clips made available on the official YouTube account tied to the revamped Kids' WB website. In 2019, MeTV acquired rerun rights to the series, returning the show to broadcast television for the first time in over 20 years, first airing on its main channel and then its new channel MeTV Toons in 2024. Until 2025, the series streamed in full and then in part on Max, a streaming service owned by Warner Bros. Discovery. The Flintstones has also been streaming on Tubi since 2021.

In Canada, The Flintstones first aired Monday nights at 9:00 Eastern time on CBC Television until the third season when it moved to the CTV Television Network. At the time, CTV aired the show at different evening time slots throughout its last three seasons. Syndicated reruns were also offered to local stations until the early-1990s. The show was also later carried overtime on YTV, Teletoon Retro, Cartoon Network, and Boomerang, alongside French channels ICI, TQS, TVA, and Prise 2.

In the United Kingdom, The Flintstones first aired on ITV in January 1961, marking the start of the program's slow spread in popularity around the world. The BBC picked up the rights for the program in 1985. The series was repeated for decades in various daytime and early evening time-slots; episodes were also sometimes used by the BBC in case of last minute schedule changes, such as coverage of sporting events being affected by bad weather. The final BBC broadcast of an episode was in 2008 on BBC Two. Additionally, the series appeared on Cartoon Network starting in the mid-1990s.

Other international networks that aired the original run of the series include RTF in France, ARD in Germany, Rai 1 and Rai 2 in Italy, NTS in the Netherlands, and Fuji TV in Japan.

== Reception ==
The night after The Flintstones premiered, Variety called it "a pen-and-ink disaster", and the series was among many that debuted in a "vast wasteland" of a 1960–61 television season considered one of the worst in television history up to that point. As late as the 1980s, critics derided the show's limited animation and derivative plots. Animation historian Michael Barrier disliked the series, calling it a "dumb sitcom" and stated that "I can readily understand why someone who as a small child enjoyed, say, The Flintstones might regard that show fondly today. I have a lot more trouble understanding why anyone would try to defend anything about it on artistic grounds."

Despite the mixed critical reviews following its premiere, The Flintstones has generally been considered a television classic and was rerun continuously for five decades after its end. In 1961, The Flintstones became the first animated series to be nominated for the Primetime Emmy Award for Outstanding Comedy Series, but lost out to The Jack Benny Program. In January 2009, IGN named The Flintstones as the ninth-best in its "Top 100 Animated TV Shows". The first season of the series received an approval rating of 100% on review aggregator Rotten Tomatoes, based on nine reviews, with an average score of 6/10. Currently, several authors consider The Flintstones as a cartoon linked to the golden age of American animation.

=== Nielsen ratings ===
Season	Time slot (ET)	Rank	Rating
1960–61	Friday at 8:30–9:00 pm	18	24.3
1961–62	Friday at 8:30–9:00 pm	21	22.9 (Tied with The Many Loves of Dobie Gillis)
1962–63	Friday at 8:30–9:00 pm	30	20.5
1963–64	Thursday at 7:30–8:00 pm	33	19.7
1964–65	Thursday at 7:30–8:00 pm (Episodes 1–14); Friday at 7:30–8:00 pm (Episodes 15–26)	60	no rating given, 29 share
1965–66	Friday at 7:30–8:00 pm	70	no rating given, 30.5 share

== Non-media products ==
The success of The Flintstones as a brand has spawned not only a wide array of variations on the media itself, but several commercial products inspired by the media.

=== Pebbles cereal ===
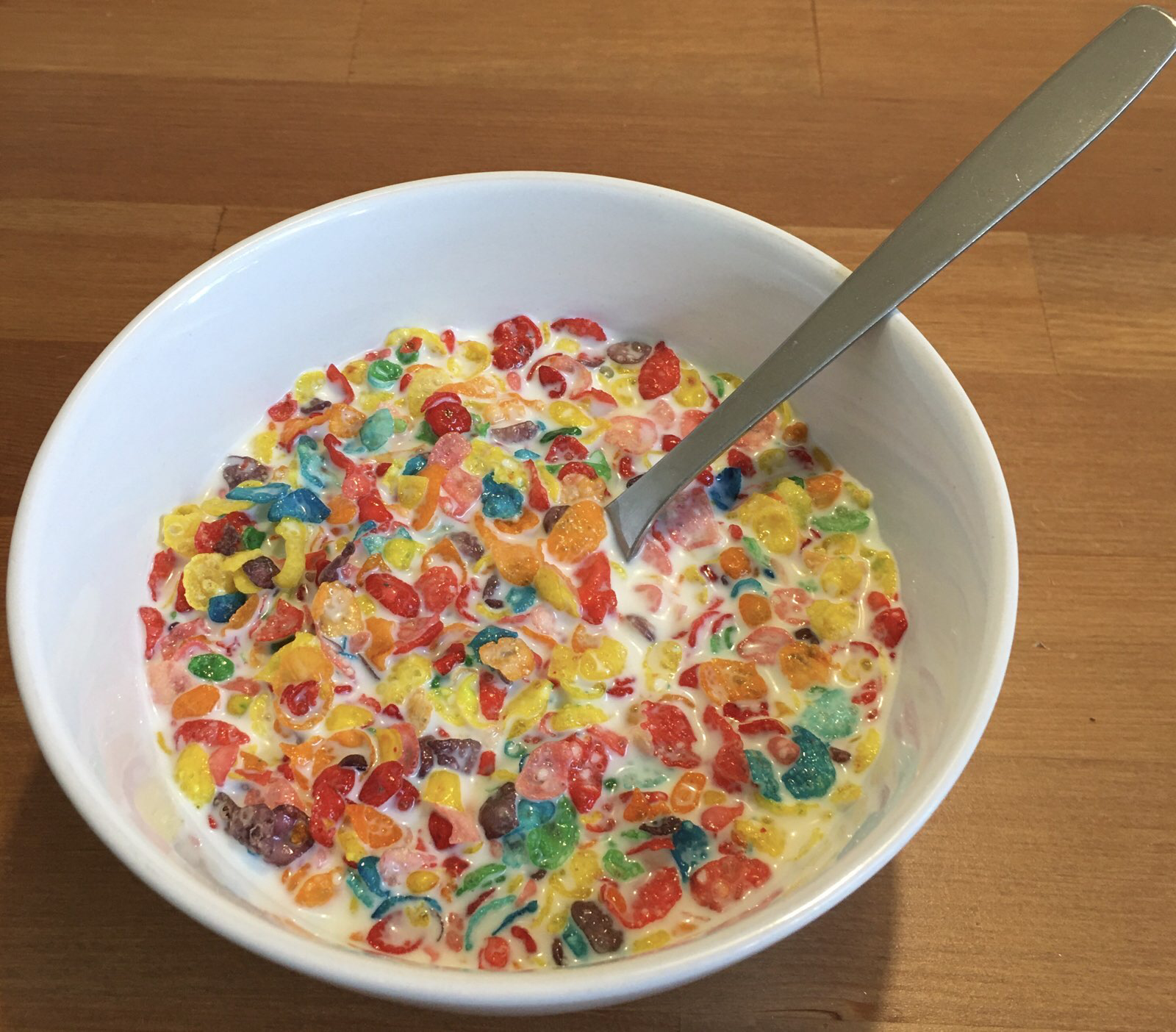
A bowl of Fruity Pebbles cereal

Pebbles is a brand of breakfast cereal which was introduced in the United States by Post Consumer Brands on October 20, 1971 featuring characters from The Flintstones as spokestoons. The product line includes Cocoa Pebbles and Fruity Pebbles.

Cocoa Pebbles contains chocolate-flavored crisp rice cereal bits, while Fruity Pebbles contains crisp rice cereal bits that come in a variety of fruit flavors with a sugar content of 9 grams per serving for Fruity Pebbles and 10 grams per serving for Cocoa Pebbles. It is the oldest cereal brand based on characters from a TV series or movie that is still sold.

=== Flintstones Chewable Vitamins ===
Flintstones Chewable Vitamins are a supplemental multivitamin for children, shaped like the characters of The Flintstones. They were introduced in 1968 by Miles Laboratories. Miles Laboratories was acquired by Bayer in 1978. The vitamins are cited as one of the most enduring pieces of Flintstones merchandise. The jingle tagline, "We are Flintstones Kids, Ten Million Strong and Growing..." (music by Martin O'Donnell, lyric by Jim Morris), became famous through heavy advertising.

They feature vitamins in the shapes of the Flintstones characters: Fred Flintstone, Wilma Flintstone, Pebbles Flintstone, Barney Rubble, Betty Rubble, Bamm-Bamm Rubble, Dino, and The Great Gazoo. For over twenty years, Betty was not included as one of the vitamins. However, after a grassroots campaign and the results of a Bayer telephone poll came in favor of including Betty, the character was added to the lineup in 1995, replacing the Flintstone car.

== See also ==
- Dinosaurs (TV series), an American family sitcom television series that aired on ABC with a similar premise but is live-action and with anthropomorphic dinosaurs
- The First Bad Man, a 1955 animated cartoon directed by Tex Avery depicting a satirical take on caveman and prehistoric life
- Alley Oop, a comic strip about a prehistoric family with commentary on American suburban life
- The Cavern Clan, a Brazilian comic strip about prehistoric life in the Stone Age
- Hanna-Barbera's All-Star Comedy Ice Revue, a 1978 special in which Hanna-Barbera characters honor Fred in an all-star celebrity roast for his birthday
- Hanna-Barbera in amusement parks
- List of Hanna-Barbera characters
- List of works produced by Hanna-Barbera Productions
- Prehistoric Peeps, a 1890 cartoon strip depicting cavemen with modern sensibilities living with dinosaurs

== Sources ==
- Lehman, Christopher P. (2007), "The Cartoons of 1961–1962", American Animated Cartoons of the Vietnam Era: A Study of Social Commentary in Films and Television Programs, 1961–1973, McFarland & Company, ISBN 978-0786451425
