= List of The Flintstones media =

- Original work: The Flintstones

Print publications
- Comics: 18

Films and television
- Film: 3
- Short film: 2
- Television series: 14
- Web series: 1
- Animated series: 9
- Television special: 16
- Television short: 2
- Television film: 5
- Direct-to-video: 1

Theatrical presentations
- Play: 1

Games
- Video game: 16

This is a list of films, television series and media associated with The Flintstones.

== Films and subsequent television series ==
Following the show's cancellation in 1966, a film based upon the series was created. The Man Called Flintstone was a musical spy caper that parodied James Bond and other secret agents. The movie was released to theaters on August 3, 1966, by Columbia Pictures. It was released on DVD by Warner Home Video in Canada in March 2005 and in United States in December 2008.

The show was revived in the early 1970s with Pebbles and Bamm-Bamm having grown into teenagers, and several different series and made-for-TV movies (broadcast mainly on Saturday mornings, with a few shown in primetime), including a series depicting Fred and Barney as police officers, another depicting the characters as children, and yet others featuring Fred and Barney encountering Marvel Comics superhero The Thing and Al Capp's comic strip character The Shmoo—have appeared over the years. The original show also was adapted into a live-action film in 1994, and a prequel, The Flintstones in Viva Rock Vegas, which followed in 2000. Unlike its sister show The Jetsons (the two shows appeared in a made-for-TV crossover movie in 1987), the revival programs were not widely syndicated or rerun alongside the original series.

=== Television series ===
Original runs:

- The Pebbles and Bamm-Bamm Show (1971–72) (one season)
- The Flintstone Comedy Hour (1972–73) (one season)
- The New Fred and Barney Show (1979) (two seasons)
- The Flintstone Comedy Show (1980–81) (two seasons)
- The Flintstone Kids (1986–88) (two seasons)
- What a Cartoon! – featuring Dino: Stay Out! (1995) and Dino: The Great Egg-Scape (1997)
- Cave Kids (1996) (one season)
- The Rubbles (2002) (shorts)
- Yabba Dabba Dinosaurs (2021–22) (two seasons)

Compilation shows:

- The Flintstone Comedy Show (1973–74)
- Fred Flintstone and Friends (1977–78)
- Fred and Barney Meet the Thing (1979) (the only original content on this show was not related to the Flintstones)
- Fred and Barney Meet the Shmoo (1979–80) (the only original content on this show was not related to the Flintstones)
- The Flintstone Funnies (1982–84)

=== Theatrical animated feature ===
- The Man Called Flintstone (1966, released by Columbia Pictures)
- Space Jam: A New Legacy (2021) – The Flintstones, the Rubbles, the Great Gazoo, a purple Bronto-Crane, and a blue Bronto-Crane make cameos watching the basketball game between the Tune Squad and the Goon Squad.

=== Television specials ===
- The Flintstones on Ice (1973)
- A Flintstone Christmas (1977)
- The Flintstones: Little Big League (1978)
- The Flintstones Meet Rockula and Frankenstone (1979)
- The Flintstones' New Neighbors (1980)
- The Flintstones: Fred's Final Fling (1980)
- The Flintstones: Wind-Up Wilma (1981)
- The Flintstones: Jogging Fever (1981)
- The Flintstones' 25th Anniversary Celebration (1986)
- The Flintstone Kids' "Just Say No" Special (1988)
- Hanna-Barbera's 50th: A Yabba Dabba Doo Celebration (1989)
- A Flintstone Family Christmas (1993)

=== Television films ===
- The Jetsons Meet the Flintstones (1987)
- I Yabba-Dabba Do! (1993)
- Hollyrock-a-Bye Baby (1993)
- A Flintstones Christmas Carol (1994)
- The Flintstones: On the Rocks (2001)

=== Educational films ===
- The Flintstones: Library Skills Series (Sound Filmstrip Kit, Xerox Films)
  - Barney Borrows a Book (1976)
  - Barney Returns a Book (1976)
- Energy: A National Issue (1977)
- Hanna-Barbera Educational Filmstrips
  - Bamm-Bamm Tackles a Term Paper (1978)
  - Bamm-Bamm: Information Please (1979)
  - The Flintstones: A Weighty Problem (1980)
  - The Flintstones: Fire Alarm (1980)
  - The Flintstones: Fire Escape (1980)
  - The Flintstones' Driving Guide (1980)
- Learning Tree Filmstrip Set
  - Learning About Families with The Flintstones (1982)
  - Learning About Basic Needs with The Flintstones (1982)
- The Flintstones: Child Guidance Show 'N Tell Picturesound Program (Record and Filmstrip)
  - Fred Learns to Share (1984)
  - Fred's Tall Tale (1984)

=== Live-action films ===
- The Flintstones (1994)
- The Flintstones in Viva Rock Vegas (2000)

=== Direct-to-video films ===
- The Flintstones & WWE: Stone Age SmackDown! (2015)

=== Canceled Seth MacFarlane reboot ===
In 2011, it was announced Family Guy creator Seth MacFarlane would be reviving The Flintstones for the Fox network, with the first episode airing in 2013. After Fox Entertainment president Kevin Reilly read the pilot script and "liked it but didn't love it", MacFarlane chose to abandon work on the project rather than restarting it.

Concept art of the series was posted on background artist Andy Clark's website.

=== Yabba Dabba Dinosaurs ===
Yabba Dabba Dinosaurs is an American animated web television series spin-off of The Flintstones that premiered in 2021, the first to feature them since they appeared in the 2002 series The Rubbles, and produced by Warner Bros. Animation. It was produced by Mark Marek and Marly Halpern-Graser.

Like Cave Kids, the show focuses on the lives of best friends Pebbles Flintstone and Bamm-Bamm Rubble, who are joined by Dino for many adventures in the Stone Age. The show was scheduled to be released as a part of the Boomerang IPTV subscription service. On August 19, 2021, it was announced the series would instead be released on HBO Max on September 30, 2021. The series was set to first air on Teletoon as a regular television series in Canada in September 2019, but ended up airing in September 2020. The show started airing on February 3, 2020, on Boomerang UK.

=== Upcoming animated film ===
In 2014, it was announced that Warner Bros. was developing an animated film with Chris Henchy, Will Ferrell, and Adam McKay, to write the script for the project. Ferrell and McKay would also be executive producers. In 2018, it was confirmed that the project was still in development and produced by Warner Animation Group, at the time it was unknown if crew members would still be involved with the production.

On June 9, 2023, as part of the restructuring of Warner Animation Group, now called Warner Bros. Pictures Animation, it was announced that a new Flintstones movie titled Meet the Flintstones was in early development and is meant to be an origin story to the series. The movie will be directed by Hamish Grieve and Todd Wilderman from a screenplay written by Aaron Horvath and Michael Jelenic. In October 2024, Wilderman revealed the film was in production and teased that the film would blend silliness and emotion and focus equally on the whole principal cast of characters.

=== Canceled Bedrock series ===
In 2019, it was reported that a new Flintstones reboot series, directed to an adult audience, was in development by Elizabeth Banks and her production company Brownstone Productions. In 2021, the series was now co-produced by Fox Entertainment and Warner Bros. Animation along with Brownstone and received the title Bedrock. The series would have taken place two decades after the original series with Fred Flintstone on the verge of retirement and a twenty-something Pebbles (voiced by Banks) trying to find her way in life as the Stone Age comes to an end and the Bronze Age arrives. On March 10, 2023, it was reported the series would have also featured the voices of Stephen Root (Fred), Amy Sedaris (Wilma), Joe Lo Truglio (Barney), Nicole Byer (Betty) and Manny Jacinto (Bamm-Bamm). It was also reported that Fox had ordered a pilot presentation of the series which was written by Lindsay Kerns. On July 17, 2024, it was reported that Fox chose to pass on the series.

== UK VHS releases ==
VHS title	Release date	Episodes/Songs/Movies/Specials
The Flintstones: The Flintstone Flyer & Hot Lips Hannigan (VC1004)	4 November 1985	"The Flintstone Flyer", "Hot Lips Hannigan"
The Flintstones Meet Rockula and Frankenstone (VC1041)	28 April 1986	Television special
The Flintstones: The Split Personality & Monster from the Tar Pits (VC1073)	9 February 1987	"The Split Personality", "The Monster from the Tar Pits"
The Flintstones Comedy Show (VC1084)	13 July 1987	"Dino's Girl", "A Rocks-Pox on You", "In Tune with Terror", "Punk Rock", "Rockjaw Rides Again"
Top Rock (VC4020)	13 July 1987	Lionel Richie: "All Night Long", Ray Parker Jr.: "Ghostbusters", Bee Gees: "Stayin' Alive", The Police: "Every Breath You Take", Roman Holiday: "Don't Try to Stop It", Rockwell: "Somebody's Watching Me", Hall and Oates: "You Make My Dreams", Huey Lewis and the News: "You Crack Me Up", Stevie Wonder: "Whereabouts", Aretha Franklin: "Freeway of Love"
The Flintstones: The Big Bank Robbery & The Snorkasaurus Story (VC1114)	5 September 1988	"The Big Bank Robbery", "The Snorkasaurus Story"
A Flintstone Christmas (VC1116)	7 November 1988	Television special
The Flintstone Kids (VC1120)	7 November 1988	"The Flintstone Fake Ache", "Worldwar Flea", "I Was a Teenage Grown-Up", "Anything You Can Do I Can Do Betty", "Dressed Up Dino", "Day of the Villains", "Rocky's Rocky Road", "The Butcher Shoppe", "Grime and Punishment", "Better Buddy Blues", "Freddy's Mechanical Dog", "The Cream-Pier Strikes Back"
The Flintstones: Love Letters on the Rocks (WP0007)	7 November 1988	Love Letters on the Rocks
The Jetsons Meet the Flintstones (VC1107)	10 April 1989	Television movie
The Flintstones: The Flintstone Flyer & Hot Lips Hannigan Re-Release (VC1004)	4 September 1989	"The Flintstone Flyer", "Hot Lips Hannigan"
The Flintstones: The Split Personality & Monster from the Tar Pits Re-Release (VC1073)	4 September 1989	"The Split Personality", "The Monster from the Tar Pits"

== VHS releases ==
Original broadcast or release dates and episode titles (where applicable) are listed in parentheses.

- The Flintstone Comedy Show: 25th Anniversary Special (1980: "Mountain Frustration", "Potion Problem", "Camp-Out Mouse", "Clownfoot", "The Ghost Sitters", "Sands of the Saharastone"): Released October 1985
- The Flintstone Comedy Show 2: Curtain Call (1980: "Gold Fever", "Night on the Town", "Monster Madness", "Arcade Antics", "Follow That Dogosaurus", "Be Patient, Fred"): Released January 1986
- The Flintstones: Little Big League (1978): Released August 5, 1986
- The Flintstones: The First Episodes (1960: "The Flintstone Flyer", "Hot Lips Hannigan", "The Swimming Pool", "No Help Wanted"): Released August 20, 1987
- The Flintstone Comedy Show: Rocky's Raiders (1966): contains the episode "The Story of Rocky's Raiders": Released 1987
- The Jetsons Meet the Flintstones (1987): Released April 7, 1988
- A Flintstone Christmas (1977): Released October 7, 1988
- Hanna-Barbera Personal Favorites: The Flintstones (1960–65: "The Split Personality", "The Blessed Event", "Ann-Margrock Presents", "The Stone-Finger Caper"): Released October 20, 1988
- The Flintstone Kids (1986–87): 12 episodes: Released November 10, 1988
- The Flintstone Kids: A "Just Say No" Special (1988): Released November 10, 1988
- The Flintstone Comedy Show: My Fair Freddy (1966): contains the episode "My Fair Freddie": Released 1988
- The Man Called Flintstone (1966): Released January 26, 1989
- The Flintstones: The First Episodes (1960: "The Flintstone Flyer", "Hot Lips Hannigan", "The Swimming Pool", "No Help Wanted"): Re-released January 26, 1989
- The Flintstones: Dripper (1966): contains the episode "Dripper": Released July 17, 1989
- The Flintstones Meet Rockula and Frankenstone (1980) with "The Flintstones' New Neighbors" as a bonus episode: Released September 1989
- The Flintstones: Masquerade Ball (1961): contains the episode "The Masquerade Ball": Released October 1989
- The Flintstones: How the Flintstones Saved Christmas (1964) contains the episode "Christmas Flintstone": Released November 9, 1989
- The Flintstones: Fred Flintstone Woos Again (1961): contains the episode "Fred Flintstone Woos Again": Released January 16, 1990
- The Flintstones: Dino & Juliet (1964): contains the episode "Dino & Juliet": Released January 16, 1990
- The Flintstones and Friends in Wacky Wayfarers (1960–61: "Hollyrock, Here I Come", "The Long, Long Weekend"): Released June 14, 1990
- The Flintstones and Friends in Jet Set Fred! (1962–64: "The Rock Vegas Story", "El Terrifico"): Released June 14, 1990
- The Flintstones: Jealousy (1966): contains the episode "Jealousy": Released September 5, 1990
- The Flintstones: A Haunted House is Not a Home (1964): contains the episode "A Haunted House is Not a Home": Released October 4, 1990
- The Flintstone Comedy Show: Fred's Island (1966): contains the episode "Fred's Island": Released 1990
- The Flintstone Comedy Show: Boss for the Day (1966): contains the episode "Boss for a Day": Released 1990
- The Flintstones: Surfin' Fred (1965): contains the episode "Surfin' Fred": Released 1990
- The Flintstones 30th Anniversary Collection:
  - The Flintstones: A Page Right Out of History!: Released March 21, 1991
  - Fred Flintstone's How to Draw!: Released March 21, 1991
  - The Flintstones First Episodes (1960: "The Flintstone Flyer", "Hot Lips Hannigan", "The Swimming Pool", "No Help Wanted"): Released March 21, 1991
  - The Flintstones Meet The Great Gazoo (1965): contains the episode "The Great Gazoo": Released March 21, 1991
  - The Flintstones Meet Samantha (1965): contains the episode "Samantha": Released March 21, 1991
  - The Man Called Flintstone (1966): Released March 21, 1991
  - The Flintstone Flyer: The Very First Episode (1960): contains the episode "The Flintstone Flyer": Released July 11, 1991
  - The Flintstones: 10 Little Flintstones (1964): contains the episode "10 Little Flintstones": Released July 11, 1991
  - The Flintstones: Hop Happy (1964): contain the episode "Hop Happy": Released July 11, 1991
  - The Flintstones: The Gravelberry Pie King (1966): contains the episode "The Gravelberry Pie King": Released July 11, 1991
  - The Flintstone Files (1964–66: "The Gravelberry Pie King", "Hop Happy", "10 Little Flintstones"): Released July 11, 1991
- The Flintstones: No Biz Like Show Biz (1965): contains the episode "No Biz Like Show Biz": Released September 26, 1991
- The Flintstones: Wacky Inventions: Released April 27, 1994
- The Flintstones: Babe in Bedrock (1963: "Dress Rehearsal", "Daddy's Little Beauty"): Released April 27, 1994
- The Flintstones: Fearless Fred Strikes Again (1962–63: "The Buffalo Convention", "Mother-in-Law's Visit"): Released April 27, 1994
- The Flintstones: Hooray for Hollyrock (1963–65: "The Return of Stony Curtis", "Ann-Margrock Presents"): Released April 27, 1994
- The Flintstones: Dino's Two Tales (1962–63: "Dino Disappears", "Dino Goes Hollyrock"): Released September 14, 1994
- The Flintstones: Rocky Bye Babies (1963–64: "Little Bamm-Bamm", "The Most Beautiful Baby in Bedrock"): Released September 14, 1994
- The Flintstones: Bedrock 'N Roll (1961–62: "The Girls' Night Out", "The Twitch"): Released September 14, 1994
- The Flintstones: Fred Takes the Field (1961–63: "Flintstone of Prinstone", "Big League Freddie"): Released September 14, 1994
- The Flintstones (1994 live-action film): Released November 8, 1994
- A Flintstones Christmas Carol (1994): Released September 26, 1995
- The Flintstones: A Haunted House is Not a Home (1964: "A Haunted House is Not a Home", "The Gruesomes"): Released September 10, 1996
- The Flintstones Christmas in Bedrock (1964 & 1993: Christmas Flintstone, A Flintstone Family Christmas): Released September 24, 1996
- The Flintstones: Love Letters on the Rocks (1961–64: "Love Letters on the Rocks", "Dino & Juliet"): Released January 14, 1997
- I Yabba-Dabba Do! (1993): Released January 14, 1997
- Cave Kids: Pebbles & Bamm-Bamm: Watch Us Grow (1996: "Kiss and Spell", "Beanstalk Blues"): Released June 10, 1997
- Cave Kids: Pebbles & Bamm-Bamm: At Play (1996: "Sand Castle Surprise", "Soap Bubble Dreams"): Released June 10, 1997
- Cave Kids: Pebbles & Bamm-Bamm: Make New Friends (1996: "China Challenge", "Of Mice and Moon"): Released June 10, 1997
- The Flintstones: Stone-Age Adventures (1960–64: "The Flintstone Flyer", "The Split Personality", "The Twitch", "Dress Rehearsal", "Ladies Night at the Lodge", "Ann-Margrock Presents"): Released March 14, 2000
- The Flintstones in Viva Rock Vegas (2000 live-action prequel to 1994 film): Released March 6, 2001
- Cartoon Crack-Ups by Cartoon Network (1960): contains the episode "The Swimming Pool": Released July 3, 2001

== LaserDisc releases ==
- The Jetsons Meet the Flintstones (1987): Released September 1989
- Hanna-Barbera Personal Favorites: The Flintstones (1960–65: "The Split Personality", "The Blessed Event", "Ann-Margrock Presents", "The Stone-Finger Caper"): Released September 1989
- Hanna-Barbera Christmas Disc (1964) contains the episode "Christmas Flintstone": Released November 22, 1991
- The Flintstones Meet Rockula and Frankenstone (1980: "The Flintstones' New Neighbors" as a bonus episode): Released January 23, 1992
- The Man Called Flintstone (1966): Released January 30, 1992
- The Flintstones: The First 30 Years, Volume 1 (1960–66: "10 Little Flintstones", "The Gravelberry Pie King", "The Flintstone Flyer", "Hop Happy"): Released May 21, 1992
- The Flintstones Comedy Show, Volume 1 (1980: "Mountain Frustration", "Potion Problem", "Camp-Out Mouse", "Clownfoot", "The Ghost Sitters", "Sands of the Saharastone"): Released March 4, 1993
- The Flintstones (1994 live-action film): Released November 8, 1994
- The Flintstones Collection (1960): Cartoon Network (along with John Kricfalusi) released a 4-disc LaserDisc set compiling the first 14 episodes of the series as they originally aired. Released February 19, 1997

== DVD releases ==
- The Flintstones (1994 live-action film): Released March 16, 1999
- The Flintstones in Viva Rock Vegas (2000 live-action film): Released September 26, 2000
- Cartoon Crack-Ups (1960: "The Swimming Pool"): Released July 3, 2001
- The Flintstones: The Complete First Season (1960–61): Released March 16, 2004
- The Flintstone Flyer: The Very First Episode (1960): Released June 8, 2004
- The Flintstones: The Complete Second Season (1961–62): Released December 7, 2004
- The Flintstones: The Complete Third Season (1962–63): Released March 22, 2005
- The Flintstones: The Complete Fourth Season (1963–64): Released November 15, 2005
- The Flintstones: The Complete Fifth Season (1964–65): Released March 7, 2006
- The Flintstones: The Complete Sixth Season (1965–66): Released September 5, 2006
- A Flintstones Christmas Carol (1994): Released October 2, 2007
- The Pebbles and Bamm-Bamm Show: The Complete Series (1971–72): Released March 18, 2008
- The Flintstones: The Complete Series (1960–66): Released October 28, 2008
- The Man Called Flintstone (1966): Released December 2, 2008
- Saturday Morning Cartoons: 1980s (1986: "The Bad News Brontos", "Invasion of the Mommy Snatchers", "Dreamchip's Car Wash", "Princess Wilma"): Released May 4, 2010
- The Jetsons Meet the Flintstones (1987): Released June 14, 2011
- A Flintstone Christmas Collection (1977, 1993: A Flintstone Christmas, A Flintstone Family Christmas): Released September 27, 2011
- 4 Kid Favorites: The Flintstones Collection (1960: 14 episodes): Released March 13, 2012
- I Yabba-Dabba Do! (1993): Released October 9, 2012
- Hollyrock-a-Bye Baby (1993): Released October 9, 2012
- The Flintstones Prime-Time Specials Collection: Volume 1 (1978–79: The Flintstones: Little Big League, The Flintstones Meet Rockula and Frankenstone): Released October 9, 2012
- The Flintstones Prime-Time Specials Collection: Volume 2 (1980–81: The Flintstones' New Neighbors, Fred's Final Fling, Wind-Up Wilma, Jogging Fever): Released October 9, 2012
- The Flintstone Kids: Rockin' in Bedrock (1986: 10 episodes): Released March 11, 2014
- Fred Flintstone and Friends (1960: 7 episodes): Released May 6, 2014
- The Flintstones & WWE: Stone Age SmackDown! (2015): Released March 10, 2015
- Hanna-Barbera Diamond Collection:
  - The Flintstones: The Complete First Season (1960–61): Re-released May 23, 2017
  - The Pebbles and Bamm-Bamm Show: The Complete Series (1971–72): Re-released June 20, 2017
  - The Flintstones: The Complete Second Season (1961–62): Re-released October 3, 2017
  - The Flintstones: The Complete Third Season (1962–63): Re-released October 3, 2017
  - The Flintstones: The Complete Fourth Season (1963–64): Re-released October 3, 2017
  - The Flintstones: The Complete Fifth Season (1964–65): Re-released October 3, 2017
  - The Flintstones: The Complete Sixth Season (1965–66): Re-released October 3, 2017
  - Hanna-Barbera Diamond Collection 4-Pack (1960–61: The Flintstones: The Complete First Season): Released December 5, 2017
  - The Flintstones: The Complete Series (1960–66): Re-released February 13, 2018
- Hanna-Barbera Holiday Triple Feature (1994: A Flintstones Christmas Carol): Released October 3, 2017
- The Flintstones: 2 Movies and 5 Specials (1966–2015): Released August 4, 2020

== Blu-ray releases ==
- The Flintstones (1994 live-action film): Released August 19, 2014
- The Flintstones & WWE: Stone Age SmackDown! (2015): Released March 10, 2015
- The Flintstones in Viva Rock Vegas (2000 live-action film): Released June 4, 2019
- The Flintstones: The Complete Series (1960–66): Released October 27, 2020
- The Jetsons Meet the Flintstones (1987): Released February 20, 2024
- The New Fred and Barney Show: The Complete Series (1979): Released January 27, 2026
- The Flintstones (1994 live-action film) (4K SteelBook): Released June 2, 2026

== Comics ==
=== Comic strips ===
- The Flintstones comic strip began October 2, 1961. Illustrated by Gene Hazelton and Roger Armstrong, and distributed by the McNaught Syndicate, it ran from 1961 to 1988. After McNaught went out of business, The Flintstones was picked up by Editors Press Service and drawn by Karen Matchette until 1998.

=== Comic books ===
- Western Publishing put out various titles of The Flintstones from 1961–70:
  - The Flintstones by Dell Comics for 5 issues in 1961–62 and by Gold Key Comics for 54 issues in 1962–70^{1}
  - The Flintstones Bigger and Boulder by Gold Key for 2 issues in 1962 and 1966^{2}
  - Cave Kids by Gold Key for 16 issues in 1963–67, depicting adventures of kids set in the Flintstones' era (with issues featuring Pebbles & Bamm-Bamm)
  - The Flintstones at the New York World's Fair through Warren Publishing in 1964
  - The Flintstones Top Comics by Gold Key for 4 issues in 1967
- Permabooks did The Flintstones featuring Pebbles in 1963^{3}
- City Magazines published 1 issue of a digest-sized The Flintstones Mini-Comic in 1965^{4}
- Charlton Comics put out various Flintstones comics from 1970–77:
  - The Flintstones and Pebbles for 50 issues in 1970–77
  - Pebbles and Bamm Bamm for 36 issues in 1972–76
  - Barney and Betty Rubble for 23 issues in 1973–76
  - Dino for 20 issues in 1973–77
  - The Great Gazoo for 20 issues in 1973–77
- Brown Watson published 1 annual The Flintstones Annual in 1976
- Marvel Comics did 9 issues of Hanna-Barbera's The Flintstones in 1977–79^{5}
  - The Flintstones Christmas Party issue #1 in 1977
  - Marvel also published 11 issues of The Flintstone Kids, depicting the characters as children, under their Star Comics imprint from 1987–89
- Blackthorne Publishing put out 4 issues of The Flintstones 3-D in 1987–88^{6} ^{7}
- Denny's restaurant chain distributed 22 volumes of The Flintstones Fun Book in 1988-90
- Harvey Comics had several Flintstones titles that ran from 1992–94:
  - The Flintstones for 13 issues in 1992–94
  - The Flintstones Big Book for 2 issues in 1992–93
  - The Flintstones Giant Size for 3 issues in 1992–93
  - Pebbles and Bamm-Bamm for 3 issues in 1993–94
  - The Flintstones Doublevision for 1 issue in 1994
- Archie Comics put out a title of The Flintstones for 22 issues in 1995–97
- DC Comics published a combo title of The Flintstones and the Jetsons for 21 issues from 1997–99
  - DC published 12 issues of a more mature and satirical comic version of The Flintstones by Mark Russell and Steve Pugh in 2016–17

Notes:
^{1} The 5 Dell issues are numbered 2–6, the Flintstones first Dell appearance was in Dell Giants # 48, 1961. The 54 Gold Key issues are numbered 7–60
^{2} Both issues are identical, and a reprint of Gold Key's earlier series
^{3} The Flintstones featuring Pebbles is part comic and part paperback. It's the first appearance of Pebbles outside the TV series
^{4} The Flintstones Mini-Comic was a supplement to an issue of Huckleberry Hound Weekly
^{5} Marvel's Hanna Barbera's The Flintstones features the first non-underground comic-work of Scott Shaw!
^{6} The Flintstones 3-D were part of the Blackthorne 3-D series, issues 19, 22, 36 and 42
^{7} Issue 4 adapted the TV series episode that introduced Pebbles to comic books for the first time

== Discography ==
- The Flintstones: Original TV Soundtracks (1961, Colpix Records) [2 stories: The Snorkasaurus, The Big Bank Robbery]
- Songs of The Flintstones (1961, Golden Records)
- The Flintstones Flip Fables: Goldi Rocks and the Three Bearosauruses (1965, Hanna-Barbera Records)
- Hansel & Gretel Starring The Flintstones (1965, Hanna-Barbera Records) [re-released in 1977 by Columbia Records]
- Wilma Flintstone Tells the Story of Bambi (1965, Hanna-Barbera Records) [re-released in 1977 by Columbia Records]
- On the Good Ship Lollipop Starring Pebbles & Bamm-Bamm (1965, Hanna-Barbera Records)
- Pebbles & Bamm-Bamm Singing Songs of Christmas (1965, Hanna-Barbera Records)
- The Flintstones and José Jiminez in the Time Machine (1966, Hanna-Barbera Records)
- The Man Called Flintstone: Music from the Original Motion Picture Soundtrack (1966, Hanna-Barbera Records)
- The Flintstones in S.A.S.F.A.T.P.O.G.O.B.S.Q.A.L.T. (1966, Hanna-Barbera Records)
- Fred Flintstone & Barney Rubble in Songs from Mary Poppins (1966, Hanna-Barbera Records)
- The Flintstones Meet The Orchestra Family (1968, Sunset Records) [re-released in 1977 by Columbia Records]
- The Flintstones (1972, Peter Pan Records) [4 stories: Birthday Blues, The Great Shape-Up, Public Citizen No. 1, Ski-Doo]
- The Flintstones (1975, Peter Pan Records) [2 stories: Ghost Chasers, Fred Flintstone Meets Weevil Primeval]
- Fred Flintstone Presents All-Time Favorite Children's Stories and Songs (1977, Columbia Records)
- The Flintstones: A Christmas in Bedrock (1993, Kid Rhino)
- The Flintstones Story (1994, Kid Rhino)
- The Flintstones Present Bedrock Hop: Hanna-Barbera Presents Funky Fred and The Bedrock Rappers (1994, Kid Rhino)
- The Flintstones: Modern Stone-Age Melodies – Original Songs from the Classic TV Show Soundtrack (1994, Kid Rhino)
- A Flintstones Motown Christmas (1996, Motown Records)
- Pebbles & Bamm-Bamm: Cave Kids Sing-Along (1997, Kid Rhino)

== Video games ==
- Yabba Dabba Doo! (1986), by Quicksilva for Amstrad CPC, Commodore 64, ZX Spectrum
- The Flintstones (1988), by Grandslam Entertainments for Amiga, Amstrad CPC, Atari ST, Commodore 64, MSX, ZX Spectrum
- The Flintstones: Dino: Lost in Bedrock (1990), by Hi Tech Expressions for MS-DOS
- The Flintstones: The Rescue of Dino & Hoppy (1991), by Taito for Nintendo Entertainment System
- The Flintstones (1991), by Grandslam Entertainments for SEGA Master System
- The Flintstones: King Rock Treasure Island (1993), by Taito for Game Boy
- The Flintstones (1993), by Taito for the Mega Drive/Genesis
- The Flintstones: The Surprise at Dinosaur Peak (1993), by Taito for Nintendo Entertainment System
- Flintstones/Jetsons: Time Warp (1994), by Philips Media for CD-i
- Fred Flintstone's Memory Match (1994), by Coastal Amusements as an arcade video game
- The Flintstones: The Treasure of Sierra Madrock (1994), by Taito for Super NES
- The Flintstones (1994–95), by Ocean Software for Game Boy, Super NES, Sega Channel
- Yearn2Learn: The Flintstones Tell-A-Tale Library (1994), by Image Smith for Windows
- Yearn2Learn: The Flintstones Bedrock Art Gallery (1995), by Image Smith for Windows
- Yearn2Learn: The Flintstones Spellasoarus Quarry (1995), by Image Smith for Windows
- The Flintstones: Bedrock Bowling (2000), by SouthPeak Interactive for PlayStation, Windows
- The Flintstones: BurgerTime in Bedrock (2001), by Electro Source for Game Boy Color, a remake of BurgerTime
- The Flintstones: Big Trouble in Bedrock (2001), by Conspiracy Entertainment for Game Boy Advance
- The Flintstones in Viva Rock Vegas (2001), by Midas Interactive for PlayStation 2
- The Flintstones: Bedrock Racing (2006), by Blast! Entertainment for PlayStation 2
- The Flintstones: Bring Back Bedrock (2014), by Warner Bros. Games for iOS, Android

== Theme parks ==
=== United States ===
Opened in 1972, King's Island, located in Mason, Ohio, north of Cincinnati, liberally featuring Hanna-Barbera characters and Hanna-Barbera Land. On September 22, 2005, Cincinnati's News 5 reported that Hanna-Barbera Land would no longer be part of the park as it switched to a Nickelodeon theme.

Bedrock City in Custer, South Dakota opened in the mid-1960s. It closed in 2015 when ownership was transferred, and the new owner could not come to a licensing agreement with Warner Bros. Bedrock City near Williams, Arizona, which opened in 1972, was a spin-off from the same family that owned the South Dakota park.

A Flintstones-themed park existed until the 1990s at Carowinds in Charlotte, North Carolina.

Kings Island (near Cincinnati) and Kings Dominion (near Richmond, Virginia) had a Hanna-Barbera land, in which many Hanna-Barbera characters were featured, including the Flintstones, in the early 1970s, 1980s and early 1990s.

=== Canada ===
In Canada, Flintstone Park in Kelowna, British Columbia, opened in 1968 and closed in 1998; it was notable for the "Forty Foot Fred" billboard of Fred Flintstone which was a well-known Kelowna landmark. Another Flintstones park was located in Bridal Falls, British Columbia, which closed in 1990. Calaway Park outside Calgary, Alberta, also opened with a Flintstones theme and many of the buildings today have a caveman-like design, though the park no longer licenses the characters. The Canada's Wonderland theme park, in Vaughan, Ontario, featured Flintstones characters in their Hanna-Barbera-themed children's sections from 1985 until the mid-1990s.

=== Other ===
The Australia's Wonderland theme park, in Eastern Creek, Sydney, featured Flintstones characters in their Hanna-Barbera-themed children's sections from 1985 until the mid-1990s.

Bedrock is one of the themed lands in the indoor Warner Bros. World Abu Dhabi park in Abu Dhabi, United Arab Emirates, mainly home to the Flintstones Bedrock River Adventure flume ride.

== Live theater ==
A stage production opened at Universal Studios Hollywood in 1994 (the year the live-action film was released), developed by Universal and Hanna-Barbera Productions, at the Panasonic Theater, replacing the Star Trek show. The story consists of Fred, Wilma, Barney, and Betty heading for "Hollyrock". The show ran until January 2, 1997.

== In popular culture ==
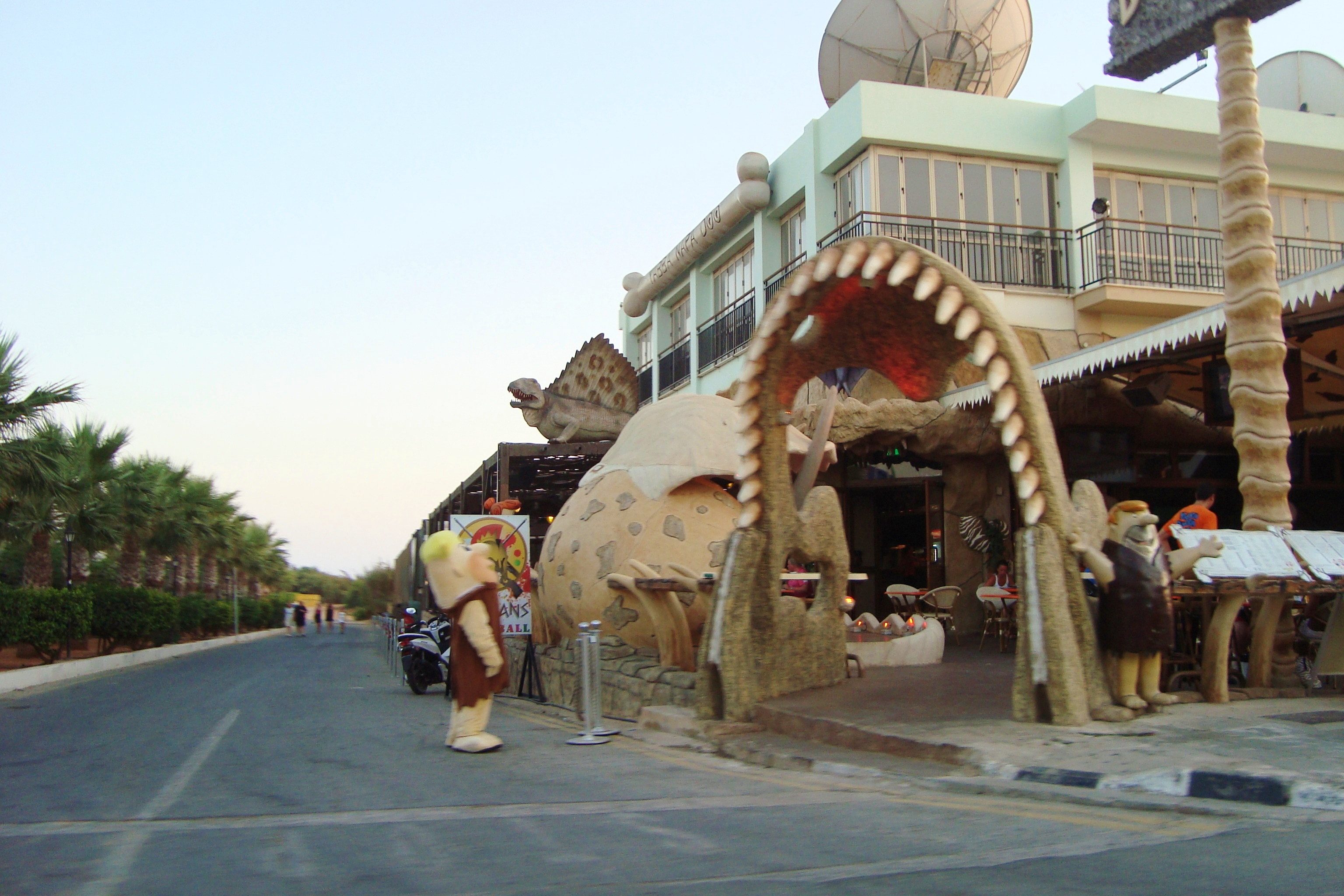
A Flintstones-themed cafeteria and bar in Ayia Napa, Cyprus

Miles Laboratories (now part of Bayer Corporation) and their One-A-Day vitamin brand was the alternate sponsor of the original Flintstones series during its first two seasons, and in the late 1960s, Miles introduced Flintstones Chewable Vitamins, fruit-flavored multivitamin tablets for children in the shape of the Flintstones characters, which are still currently being sold.

The Simpsons referenced The Flintstones in several episodes. In the episode "Homer's Night Out", Homer's local convenience store clerk, Apu, remarks "You look familiar, sir. Are you on the television or something?", to which Homer replies "Sorry, buddy, you've got me confused with Fred Flintstone." During the couch gag of the opening credits of the episode "Kamp Krusty", the Simpson family arrive home to find the Flintstone family already sitting on their couch. The same couch gag was reused in syndicated episodes of "The Itchy & Scratchy & Poochie Show", when The Simpsons overtook The Flintstones as the longest-running animated series. In "Lady Bouvier's Lover", Homer's boss, Mr. Burns, appears at the family's house and says "Why, it's Fred Flintstone (referring to Homer) and his lovely wife, Wilma! (Marge) Oh, and this must be little Pebbles! (Maggie) Mind if I come in? I brought chocolates." Homer responds by saying "Yabba-dabba-doo!" The opening of "Marge vs. the Monorail" depicts Homer leaving work in a similar way to Fred Flintstone in the opening of The Flintstones, during which he sings his own version of the latter's opening theme only to slam into a chestnut tree.

On September 30, 2010, Google temporarily replaced the logo on its search page with a custom graphic celebrating the 50th anniversary of The Flintstones' first TV broadcast.
