= Fred Seibert cartoon shorts filmography =

These are the complete filmographies for the cartoon shorts series created by American animation producer Fred Seibert from 1995 through 2022, at Hanna-Barbera Cartoons and his animation production companies Frederator Studios and FredFilms.

== What a Cartoon! (aka World Premiere Toons) (1995–1997) ==
What a Cartoon! was producer Fred Seibert's first cartoon incubator series, featuring 48 original animated shorts produced by Hanna-Barbera for Cartoon Network. The shorts are listed in the order that they originally aired.

The spin-off series led to Dexter's Laboratory, Cow and Chicken, Johnny Bravo, I Am Weasel, Courage the Cowardly Dog, and The Powerpuff Girls being greenlit.

No.	Title	Episode	Created by	Hanna-Barbera	Cartoon Network Studios	Plot	Original air date
1	The Powerpuff Girls	"Meat Fuzzy Lumkins"	Craig McCracken	Yes	No	The Powerpuff Girls fight to stop Fuzzy Lumpkins' plot to turn everything into meat. Note 1: This episode was included as a bonus toon on various Cartoon Network Video releases throughout the series run. Note 2: First pilot to The Powerpuff Girls.	February 20, 1995
2	Dexter's Laboratory	—N/a	Genndy Tartakovsky	Yes	No	Dee Dee and Dexter battle turning each other into animals, using Dexter's latest invention. Note 1: First short to become a series after being deemed most popular through a vote held in 1995. Note 2: This episode was nominated for an Emmy. Note 3: First pilot to Dexter's Laboratory.	February 26, 1995
3	Yuckie Duck	"Short Orders"	Pat Ventura	Yes	No	Yuckie Duck works as a cook and waiter in a dirty restaurant, and delivers unappealing orders to the demanding customers.	March 5, 1995
4	Dino	"Stay Out!"	Hanna-Barbera (original character)	Yes	No	The Flintstones' pet, Dino, tries to keep the house cat outside for the night. Note: First spin-off episode to The Flintstones.	March 19, 1995
5	Johnny Bravo	—N/a	Van Partible	Yes	No	Johnny Bravo tries to score with a zookeeper girl by capturing a runaway gorilla. Note: First pilot to Johnny Bravo.	March 26, 1995
6	Sledgehammer O'Possum	"Out and About"	Patrick Ventura	Yes	No	A trouble-making possum named Sledgehammer frustrates a dog's plans to enjoy a quiet summer day out.	April 2, 1995
7	George and Junior	"Look Out Below"	Pat Ventura	Yes	No	Classic duo George and Junior attempt to fix a lightbulb an angry pigeon keeps breaking. Note: This short was a re-imagining of the original George and Junior cartoons.	April 9, 1995
8	Hard Luck Duck	—N/a	William Hanna	Yes	No	After venturing away from Harley Gator‘s watch, Hard Luck Duck is a hungry fox's target to be cooked.	April 16, 1995
9	Shake & Flick	"Raw Deal in Rome"	Michael Rann, Eugene Mattos, and George Johnson	Yes	No	A flea named Flick has a personal agenda with a local performer, a poodle named Shake, in an anachronistic Rome setting where the two constantly try to one up each other. Note: This short was nominated to be adapted into a series but it lost to Johnny Bravo.	June 18, 1995
10	The Adventures of Captain Buzz Cheeply	"A Clean Getaway"	Meinert Hansen	Yes	No	Captain Buzz Cheeply and his robot sidekick, Slide, must escape a planet full of "Blubnoids" who have abnormally sized foreheads but small-sized brains whilst trying to do their laundry.	June 25, 1995
11	O. Ratz with Dave D. Fly	"Rat in a Hot Tin Can"	Jerry Reynolds and Russ Harris	Yes	No	A rat named O. Ratz and his fly companion, Dave D. Fly, try to find a place to stay for the night during winter in the city.	July 2, 1995
12	Pfish and Chip	"Short Pfuse"	Butch Hartman, Michael Rann, and Eugene Mattos	Yes	No	Pfish (a shark) and Chip (a short-tempered lynx) attempt to stop the squeaky-laughing Mad Bomber while the Chief naps.	July 9, 1995
13	The Fat Cats	"Drip Dry Drips"	Jon McClenahan	Yes	No	Brothers Louie and Elmo set a laundry business, expecting to earn some cash. They get a request from the President, but accidentally destroy his suit.	July 16, 1995
14	George and Junior (uncredited)	"George and Junior's Christmas Spectacular"	Patrick A. Ventura & Kate Barris	Yes	No	George and Junior are forced to deliver one of Santa's presents after they fail to mail in one of his letters.	July 23, 1995
15	Yoink! of the Yukon	—N/a	Don Jurwich, Jerry Eisenberg, and Jim Ryan	Yes	No	The mounted police has its uniforms stolen, so Yoink and Sergeant Farnsworth Farflung are sent to retrieve them.	July 30, 1995
16	Yuckie Duck	"I'm on My Way"	Patrick A. Ventura	Yes	No	Yuckie Duck works as a paramedic, but does more harm than good to his patients.	August 6, 1995
17	Mina and the Count	"Interlude with a Vampire"	Rob Renzetti	Yes	No	Vlad the Count is forced to play with Mina after a mix-up in the schedule with his victims. Note: Pilot to the Mina and the Count shorts which are featured on Season 2 of Oh Yeah! Cartoons, making it the only short to appear in both cartoon variety shows.	November 5, 1995
18	Cow and Chicken	"No Smoking"	Dave Feiss	Yes	No	The Devil (later known as the Red Guy) kidnaps Chicken, who must be saved from damnation of smoking by Super Cow (who is his sister, Cow). Note 1: This episode was nominated for an Emmy. Note 2: Pilot to Cow and Chicken.	November 12, 1995
19	Boid 'n' Woim	—N/a	C. Miles Thompson	Yes	No	A worm named Mr. Woim hitchhikes in the middle of the California desert alongside a bird named Mr. Boid. While driving there, Woim crashes Boid's car and they begin to hallucinate.	January 1, 1996
20	Jof	"Help?"	Bruno Bozzetto	Yes	No	A cat that pricks his finger while sewing asks for help at the hospital, but its personnel do more harm then good.	January 14, 1996
21	Podunk Possum	"One Step Beyond"	Joe Orrantia and Elizabeth Stonecypher	No	Yes	A possum acquires an abandoned farm with three chickens to lay eggs for him, and has to defend them from a fried chicken titan, Major Portions.	January 21, 1996
22	The Powerpuff Girls	"Crime 101"	Craig McCracken	Yes	No	The Powerpuff Girls aid the bumbling Amoeba Boys in becoming able criminals. Note: Second pilot to The Powerpuff Girls.	January 28, 1996
23	Wind-Up Wolf	—N/a	William Hanna	Yes	No	The Big Bad Wolf creates a robot minion wolf to attempt to finally get the Three Little Pigs. Note: William Hanna's final cartoon short.	February 4, 1996
24	Hillbilly Blue	—N/a	Michael Ryan	Yes	No	Crawdad Eustace is fed-up with being treated as food and goes with possum pal Mordechai on a cross-country trip to New Orleans.	February 11, 1996
25	Courage the Cowardly Dog	"The Chicken from Outer Space"	John R. Dilworth	Yes	No	Courage tries to stop an alien chicken's plans to invade Earth while in his owners' farm. Note 1: This short was nominated for an Oscar. Note 2: Pilot to Courage the Cowardly Dog.	February 18, 1996
26	Pizza Boy	"No Tip"	Robert Alvarez	Yes	No	Pizza Boy must deliver a pizza to Antarctica safe and sound under five minutes, or else he will receive no tip.	February 25, 1996
27	Gramps	—N/a	Mike Ryan and Butch Hartman	Yes	No	Gramps tells his grandchildren about his battle against invading aliens.	March 3, 1996
28	Dexter's Laboratory	"The Big Sister"	Genndy Tartakovsky	Yes	No	Dexter prevents giantess Dee Dee from attacking the whole city. Note 1: This episode was nominated for an Emmy. Note 2: Second pilot to Dexter's Laboratory.	March 10, 1996
29	Bloo's Gang	"Bow-Wow Buccaneers"	Mike Milo and Harry McLaughlin	Yes	No	Bloo and his dog friends sneak out of their owner's houses at midnight to set on a pirate adventure in the city.	March 17, 1996
30	Jungle Boy	"Mr. Monkeyman"	Van Partible	No	Yes	Jealous King Raymond attempts to taint hero Jungle Boy's reputation after he begins to lose fame.	October 9, 1996
31	Godfrey & Zeek	"Lost Control"	Jason Butler Rote and Zac Moncrief	No	Yes	A giraffe named Godfrey and a pig named Zeek leave their zoo home and visit a residual water treatment plant to retrieve the remote control they accidentally flushed down the toilet.	October 16, 1996
32	Tumbleweed Tex	"School Daze"	Robert Alvarez	No	Yes	A Wild West outlaw needs to finish the fourth grade and deal with his obnoxious class rival, Little Timmy.	October 23, 1996
33	Buy One, Get One Free	—N/a	Charlie Bean, Carey Yost, and Don Shank	No	Yes	A man named Reilly gets a cat named Flinch in order to impress a female cat lover named Sofie and threatens the cat that if there is a scratch on anything while he's away, he will send him to the violin factory. It won't be easy when Sophie leaves Flinch a feline playmate named Fix that only wants to party.	October 30, 1996
34	The Kitchen Casanova	—N/a	John McIntyre	No	Yes	A first-time cook named Jesse is preparing a dinner for his date. Trouble arises when the wind flips the pages from his cookbook.	November 6, 1996
35	The Ignoramooses	—N/a	Mike Milo and Harry McLaughlin	No	Yes	Two moose believe they are going to be adopted by a rich hunter due to tracking collars that a biologist put on them (they think they are pet collars), and wreak havoc in his mansion.	November 13, 1996
36	Johnny Bravo (uncredited)	"Johnny Bravo and the Amazon Women"	Van Partible	Yes	No	Johnny Bravo is left stranded in an island filled with beautiful giant women. Note: Second pilot to Johnny Bravo.	January 1, 1997
37	Pfish and Chip	"Blammo the Clown"	Butch Hartman, Michael Rann, and Eugene Mattos	No	Yes	The bomb squad, Pfish and Chip, face yet another clown bomber, Blammo. It isn't easy when they have to watch and protect the chief's teddy bear whilst trying to stop the clown.	January 8, 1997
38	Awfully Lucky	—N/a	Davis Doi	No	Yes	A greedy guy named Luther discovers the Paradox Pearl, which brings him good luck, but not without consequences. When Luther tries to turn it in to the city museum for ten million dollars, he finds out just how harsh the consequences are.	January 15, 1997
39	Strange Things	—N/a	Mike Wellins	No	Yes	A robot finds a job as a janitor. He must remember that if it says "Don't Touch", don't touch. Note: The series' only computer-animated short.	January 22, 1997
40	Snoot's New Squat	—N/a	Jeret Ochi and Victor Ortado	No	Yes	Snoot, the flea-like alien, finds a new home on a neurotic neat-freak dog, Al. Note: A reference to the popular movie Forrest Gump is made by Snoot when Al runs away. Snoot morphs into a girl and shouts the same way as Jenny does to Forrest.	January 29, 1997
41	Larry and Steve	—N/a	Seth MacFarlane	No	Yes	Steve, a homeless dog, is adopted by dimwit Larry (the only man to understand dog) and lives disaster after disaster when Larry takes him shopping. Note: Episode's style developed into MacFarlane's Family Guy.	February 5, 1997
42	Sledgehammer O'Possum	"What's Goin' on Back There?!"	Patrick A. Ventura	Yes	No	Sledgehammer O'Possum takes shelter from the cold in a mailbox, much to the dismay of a mailman named Ethel who will stop at nothing to make him leave.	February 12, 1997
43	The Zoonatiks	"Home Sweet Home"	Paul Parducci, James Giordano, and R.J. Reiley	No	Yes	A bear named Bill, a monkey named Knuckles and a turtle named Shelby try to enter the all-star Hackensack Zoo after feeling unwanted at the circus.	February 19, 1997
44	Swamp and Tad	"Mission Imfrogable"	John Rice and Achiu So	Yes	No	Swamp and Tad, two frog guards who work on Planet Marsh, are sent by the King to get a package on Earth.	February 26, 1997
45	Dino	"The Great Egg-Scape"	Hanna-Barbera (original character)	Yes	No	Dino takes care of a baby dinosaur and tries to prevent him from growing. Note: Second and final spin-off episode to The Flintstones.	March 5, 1997
46	Malcom and Melvin	—N/a	Ralph Bakshi	No	Yes	Melvin is an alienated loser until he meets Malcom, a trumpeter cockroach who has a huge talent. Note: The creator Bakshi disowned both shorts upon release.	November 26, 1997
47	The Worm (uncredited)	"Tales of Worm Paranoia"	Eddie Fitzgerald	No	Yes	Johnny is a peaceful and forgiving worm until a human steps on him repeatedly. As a result, the worm becomes paranoid and angered at the human race, seeking revenge. Note: Style reminiscent of John Kricfalusi's The Ren & Stimpy Show; he is listed with a "Special Thanks" credit.	November 27, 1997
48	Malcom and Melvin (uncredited)	"Babe! He... Calls Me"	Ralph Bakshi	No	Yes	Melvin's saga continues as his partnership with Malcom is compromised by an urban superhero's intrusion. Meanwhile, Melvin's mother aids a criminal after being unable to meet with her son. Note: The creator Bakshi disowned both shorts upon release.	November 28, 1997

== Oh Yeah! Cartoons (1998–2002) ==
Oh Yeah! Cartoons was Fred Seibert's second cartoon incubator and Frederator Studios' first production, with 99 original shorts exhibited on Nickelodeon. The shorts are listed in the order that they originally aired.

The series led to The Fairly OddParents, ChalkZone, and My Life as a Teenage Robot being greenlit for the network.

Season	Segments	Episodes	Originally released		Hosted by
Season	Segments	Episodes	First released	Last released	Hosted by
1	39	13	July 19, 1998	October 18, 1998	N/A
2	39	13	September 18, 1999	December 18, 1999	Kenan Thompson
3	24	8	March 23, 2002	August 30, 2002	Josh Server

=== Episodes ===
==== Season 1 (1998) ====
Hosted by various school kids from Brooklyn.

No.	Title	Created by	Original release date
1a	"ChalkZone"	Bill Burnett and Larry Huber	July 19, 1998
A young boy named Rudy Tabootie discovers ChalkZone, a world made of living chalk drawings. He meets up with Snap, one of his creations, and teams up with him to defeat a monster.
1b	"Slap T. Pooch in What is Funny?"	Bill Burnett and Vincent Waller	July 19, 1998
Slap T. Pooch attempts to ask the audience watching him how he can make him and his cartoon funny.
1c	"Jelly's Day"	Bill Burnett and Greg Emison	July 19, 1998
When Jelly is visited by her weird cousin Hargus, she decides to take him to the beach. Coming Attraction = Cat & Milk-Man
2a	"F-Tales"	Rob Renzetti	July 26, 1998
In a fairy-tale parody of The X-Files, Fauna Fox and Chic Little attempt to protect The Three Little Pigs from the Big Bad Wolf.
2b	"25-Cent Trouble / Teddy & Art"	Alex Kirwan	July 26, 1998
Little Teddy and his panting dog Art decide to spend twenty five cents on an action robot in a supermarket vending machine. Teddy and Art end up chasing the robot from mess to mess as the robot grows bigger and bigger by the minute.
2c	"Cat & Milk-Man"	Miles Thompson	July 26, 1998
A thirsty cat tries to steal milk from a milkman, who won't let the cat interrupt his deliveries. Coming Attraction = Jamal the Funny Frog: Mind the Baby, Jamal
3a	"Jamal the Funny Frog: Mind the Baby, Jamal"	Pat Ventura	August 2, 1998
Jamal the Frog is responsible for watching his sister Polly.
3b	"Thatta Boy"	Alex Kirwan	August 2, 1998
Cyborg kid hero Thatta Boy and his sidekick Zio team up with his girlfriend Polly to fight evil.
3c	"Hobart: The Weedkeeper"	Bill Burnett and Greg Emison	August 2, 1998
Hobart goes to extremes to impress his girlfriend Okra by buying her a puppy to replace the toaster that she walks. After chasing the escaped puppy into the septic system, Hobart comes across a crazy gremlin, a gigantic hungry tree frog, and a large mosquito. Coming Attraction = Pete Patrick, P.I.: What About Lunch?
4a	"Protecto-5000"	John Eng	August 9, 1998
Kenny, an intergalactic Protecto-5000 robot bodyguard who has been on Earth for hundreds of millions of years, takes up the position of a school janitor. He soon befriends a new student named Nadya, and protects her from the hassles that come with transferring to a new school.
4b	"Ask Edward: All About Babies"	Rob Renzetti	August 9, 1998
Dog brothers Edward and Emo, after hearing their parents consider having another child, state their own ideas about the mystery of where babies come from.
4c	"Pete Patrick, P.I.: What About Lunch?"	Vincent Waller	August 9, 1998
Kid detective Peter Patrick and talking cat sidekick Persian Puss attempt to solve the mystery of a missing dog. Coming Attraction: Max's Special Problem
5a	"Max and His Special Problem"	Dave Wasson and Chris Miller	August 16, 1998
Max, a not-so-efficient worker in a very efficient office, sneezes hard enough that his brain ejects from his head. Max then goes through a series of gags to try and reinsert his brain.
5b	"Tutu the Superina"	Bill Burnett and Sally Rousse	August 16, 1998
Tutu, a superhero ballerina, tries to stop a pair of criminals who kidnap, sell, and torment animals.
5c	"Blotto"	Byron Vaughns	August 16, 1998
In a short told through song, a drop of ink creates Blotto, who sings about the ink world he lives in and hopes to win the charms of the grouchy Dotto. Dotto is soon won over by the Balloon Goon, the villain of a comic book next to the paper she and Blotto are drawn on, and Blotto tries to free Dotto from the Goon's clutches. Coming Attraction: Olly & Frank
6a	"Tales from the Goose Lady: Jack and the Beatstalk"	Dave Wasson	August 23, 1998
The Goose Lady bothers siblings Dot and Randy as her talking wand Juanito tells a version of Jack and the Beanstalk, wherein Jack is a beatnik who hopes to acquire a giant's magic coffee machine.
6b	"Twins Crimson and Those Amazing Robots"	Carlos Ramos	August 23, 1998
Rambunctious twins Bene and Beck Crimson are forced to go out and play by their mother. They suddenly discover a jungle in their backyard that is being torn down to make way for a futuristic city called Metroplex. The twins then come face to face with powerful robots, and they work together with the jungle's animals to fight back against them.
6c	"Olly and Frank"	Bob Boyle	August 23, 1998
Child prodigy Olly regularly has his love interest Daisy May stolen from him by the beefy bully Bratwurst. Hoping to get revenge on Bratwurst, Olly creates Frank, a monster with the brain and body of a dog. Olly soon finds out that training his creation is no easy task. Coming Attraction: A Cop & His Donut
7a	"APEX Cartoon Props & Novelties"	Larry Huber	August 30, 1998
A pair of cartoon villains sneak into the APEX factory, where all the great cartoon devices are made. They also, unfortunately, experience them all first hand.
7b	"A Cop and His Donut"	Rob Renzetti	August 30, 1998
A rookie cop investigates a bank robbery where his veteran partner is injured. He then ends up meeting his partner's partner: a living, talking donut. The donut and the rookie are then forced to work together to capture the bank robbers.
7c	"Enchanted Adventures"	John Eng and Bill Burnett	August 30, 1998
A knight with a transforming sword must match wits with an evil sorcerer to save his village from a plague. Coming Attraction: Super Santa: Jingle Bell Justice
8a	"The Fairly OddParents"	Butch Hartman	September 6, 1998
A ten-year-old boy named Timmy Turner ends up receiving two wish granting fairy godparents named Cosmo and Wanda, and he uses them to help him get even with his evil babysitter, Vicky.
8b	"Hobart: Deep Sea Diva"	Bill Burnett and Greg Emison	September 6, 1998
Hobart and Okra learn about the topsy-turvy life of Hobart's pet goldfish.
8c	"Super Santa: Jingle Bell Justice"	Mike Bell	September 6, 1998
The villainous Bedlam Bunny, angered at being made into something cute instead of cool, invents a ray gun that turns toys evil. It is up to Santa Claus and his wife Emma, revealed to be superheroes, to stop the bunny before his toy army overruns the city. Coming Attraction: That's My Pop: There's A Dinosaur In The House
9a	"Kitty the Hapless Cat"	Zac Moncrief	September 13, 1998
A talking cat named Kitty recounts the many, many times he's been adopted into a home, only to end up having it go horribly wrong.
9b	"That's My Pop: There's A Dinosaur In The House"	Pat Ventura	September 13, 1998
Genius Naomi tries to keep her father from finding out that a dinosaur is in the house.
9c	"Hubbykins & Sweetie Pie"	Rob Renzetti	September 13, 1998
In a silent short, Sweetie Pie grows frustrated at the antics of her careless and slovenly husband Hubbykins. When Hubby tries to get out of doing his share of the chores and go bowling, his wife snaps and chases him around the house to teach him a lesson. Coming Attraction: Hey Look!
10a	"The Man with No Nose"	Larry Huber	September 20, 1998
Urp is an alien stranded on Earth, and has spent the last 8 years being showcased as "The Man with No Nose" in a circus sideshow. He soon meets a young boy in the circus that offers to help him find a way to power his ship and return to his planet.
10b	"Youngstar3"	Miles Thompson	September 20, 1998
The Youngstar-3, consisting of Youngstar, his grandpa Old Man, and super-powered robot Shero, attempt to fight a giant fish monster that emerges from the depths of the ocean.
10c	"Hey Look!"	Harvey Kurtzman (adapted by Vincent Waller)	September 20, 1998
Two guys go on a job hunt with no experience and get into one mess after another. Coming Attraction: ChalkZone: The Amazin' River
11a	"ChalkZone: The Amazin' River"	Bill Burnett and Larry Huber	September 27, 1998
Rudy and Snap travel down a river to a mine filled with magic chalk.
11b	"Tales from the Goose Lady: Hamsel and Grande"	Dave Wasson	September 27, 1998
The Goose Lady and Juanito return, keeping Dot and Randy awake all night by telling them a version of Hansel and Gretel, who are depicted as overweight gluttons who keep eating the innocent witch's gingerbread house.
11c	"The Feelers"	Bill Burnett	September 27, 1998
The Feelers, an all-insect rock band, are tired of performing on the streets and living in obscurity. The band's singer, Mitzi Moth, believes that getting their music to humans' ears will solve their problems, so she has the band sneak into a recording studio to hopefully have their music played on the radio. Coming Attraction: Max and the Pigeon Incident
12a	"Max and the Pigeon Incident"	Dave Wasson	October 18, 1998
After being told not to leave his office, Max goes on an adventure to chase after the pigeon who steals his pencil.
12b	"Zoomates!"	Seth MacFarlane	October 18, 1998
In this canned laughter-heavy cartoon, an animal rights activist named Helen orders the head of the local zoo to free the zoo's animals. To prove her beliefs have merit, she has three of the zoo's animals, Mark the Polar Bear, Paul the Alligator, and Warren the Ostrich, move into an apartment in the hopes that the trio can adapt to human life.
12c	"Microcops"	John Eng	October 18, 1998
Officer Jones is the microscopic product of an anti-flu capsule ingested by a sick man. When the other antibodies are captured by the flu bug making the man sick, Jones must seek out the bug and exterminate it himself. Coming Attraction: Planet Kate
13a	"Planet Kate"	Jamie Mitchell	October 11, 1998
A young girl named Kate Moon meets a quintet of extraterrestrial dogs, and ends up joining them in their search for an ancient city where their people used to live.
13b	"Fathead"	Vince Calandra	October 11, 1998
In order to pass a test of manhood, an intelligent caveboy named Fathead must steal the egg of a Tyrannosaurus rex.

==== Season 2 (1999) ====
Hosted by Kenan Thompson.

No.	Title	Created by	Original release date
1a	"Chalkzone: Rudy's Date"	Bill Burnett and Larry Huber	September 18, 1999
Snap, Rudy and his friend Penny try to gather parts to an erased formula.
1b	"A Kid's Life"	Ken Kessel	September 18, 1999
1c	"The Fairly OddParents: Too Many Timmys!"	Butch Hartman	September 18, 1999
Having been left alone with a demanding, "injured" Vicky babysitting him and using him as a servant, Timmy wishes up a bunch of clones to do his chores for him. However, when they scare Vicky out of her mind and chaos ensues, Timmy must wish them away.
2a	"The Fairly OddParents: Where's the Wand?"	Butch Hartman	September 18, 1999
While Timmy, Cosmo, and Wanda are playing games, Wanda's wand accidentally ends up with Vicky, who uses Wanda's wand as a prop for her fairy costume at her High School costume party, and Timmy must get back the wand since it is granting Vicky's wishes.
2b	"Magic Trixie"	Alex Kirwan	September 18, 1999
A young girl tries a magic trick with no success, but at a magic show, she outshines the magician.
2c	"Tales from the Goose Lady: Humpty Dumpty"	Dave Wasson	September 18, 1999
While making them missing out on their science exam, The Goose and Juanito tell Dot and Randy the story of a chicken laying a popular Humpty Dumpty instead of a golden egg.
3a	"Tales from the Goose Lady: Little Pigs Three"	Dave Wasson	September 25, 1999
3b	"Freddy Seymore's Amazing Life"	Tim Biskup	September 25, 1999
3c	"Jamal the Funny Frog: His Musical Moment"	Pat Ventura	September 25, 1999
4a	"ChalkZone: Snap Out of Water"	Bill Burnett and Larry Huber	October 2, 1999
Snap accidentally travels outside of ChalkZone and into Rudy's classroom.
4b	"Earth to Obie"	Guy Vasilovich	October 2, 1999
Lacking attention from his parents, ten year old Obie fantasizes. In this story, Obie confronts his cereal addiction when he accompanies his mom on a trip to the grocery store.
4c	"Mina & The Count: The Ghoul's Tribunal"	Rob Renzetti	October 2, 1999
Vlad the Vampire Count is brought to court when it is found out that he is friends with a human girl named Mina.
5a	"ChalkZone: Secret Passages"	Bill Burnett and Larry Huber	October 9, 1999
Snap helps Rudy and Penny find a Chalkzone portal that leads to their school in order to retrieve the class hamster.
5b	"Kid from S.C.H.O.O.L."	Bob Boyle and Bill Riling	October 9, 1999
Jake Slade, the top agent at Benedict Arnold High School, must stop the nefarious plot of Simon Cerebellum to become Prom King with his wide array of gadgets.
5c	"Mina & The Count: The Vampire Who Came to Dinner"	Rob Renzetti	October 9, 1999
Mina invites The Count to have dinner with her family.
6a	"The Fairly OddParents: Party of 3"	Butch Hartman	October 16, 1999
Vicky tries to get proof of Timmy having a party at his house while Mr. and Mrs. Turner are out, but fails miserably.
6b	"The Forgotten Toy Box: The Curse of the Werebaby"	Mike Bell	October 16, 1999
In a parody of The Twilight Zone, the short's host, Mr. Beasley (a doll whose dialogue begins after pulling his string) anthologizes a tale of a cursed baby doll that transforms a selfish adult man who still acts like a baby into a werebaby (an adult sized baby) as punishment for not acting his age.
6c	"Jelly's Day: Uncle Betty's Strange Rush"	Greg Emison and Bill Burnett	October 16, 1999
Uncle Betty comes to visit in the museum of stuff from outer space where Jelly visit, but he gets a strange rash.
7a	"ChalkZone: ChalkDad"	Bill Burnett and Larry Huber	October 23, 1999
Rudy gets creative on his dad’s specials board, but his dad hates Rudy’s drawings and ideas. Feeling rejected, Rudy escapes to Chalkzone. There he runs into his Chalkdad, who turns out to be just as fussy, ordering Rudy to help him by drawing his restaurant. Despite the fact that his Chalkdad hates the design, the restaurant turns out to be the hottest business in Chalkzone.
7b	"A Dog & His Boy"	Carlos Ramos	October 23, 1999
7c	"Mina & the Count: Playing a Hunch"	Rob Renzetti	October 23, 1999
The Count tries to hide Mina from his servant Igor.
8a	"The Fairly OddParents: The Fairy Flu"	Butch Hartman	October 30, 1999
Cosmo and Wanda have caught the fairy flu and whenever they sneeze, their magic effects everything around them. This is problem trouble for Timmy, who has been invited to a birthday party for Tootie, Vicky's younger sister. Tootie, unlike her sister, is madly in love with Timmy, worsening the situation.
8b	"Lollygaggin'"	Guy Vasilovich	October 30, 1999
Lolly discovers that her little lies have been growing in her closet and are out to haunt her.
8c	"Tales from the Goose Lady: The Tortoise & the Hairpiece"	Dave Wasson	October 30, 1999
9a	"ChalkZone: Chalk Rain"	Bill Burnett and Larry Huber	November 6, 1999
A Chinese dragon causes havoc in Chalkzone.
9b	"The Dan Danger Show"	Butch Hartman	November 6, 1999
On TV, he is brave jungle explorer Dan Danger; in real life, however, he is extremely meek and frightened of just about everything. Dan's fear of flying gets the better of him when he is sent to take a trip via airplane.
9c	"Mina & The Count: My Best Friend"	Rob Renzetti	November 6, 1999
After a bully mocks Mina after telling her class about her vampire friend, Vlad tries to teach Mina how to scare him.
10a	"The Fairly OddParents: The Temp"	Butch Hartman	November 13, 1999
Cosmo and Wanda must go to the Fairy Academy to have their Godparenting License renewed, and their drill instructor is the toughest fairy in the universe, Jorgen Von Strangle. While they are absent, Timmy gets a substitute godparent, Jeff, who can only make toys; it turns out that Jeff is a runaway elf from the North Pole.
10b	"Herb"	Antoine Guilbaud	November 13, 1999
A monster in a diaper provides a five-star meal to the entire school and wins the students' favor.
10c	"Jamal the Funny Frog: Milk Dreams"	Pat Ventura	November 13, 1999
Polly is overcome with a thirst for milk while Jamal enters her dreams to save her.
11a	"The Fairly OddParents: The Zappys"	Butch Hartman	November 20, 1999
Timmy, Cosmo, and Wanda are nominated for a Fairy World award show, but Jorgen Von Strangle, the toughest fairy in the universe, uses his power to "persuade" the judges; in a subplot, Timmy's left buck tooth is loose.
11b	"Let's Talk Turkey"	Vincent Waller	November 20, 1999
Thom Turkey he sells his way out of a hot pot by peddling processed "Phlab" meat.
11c	"Tales from the Goose Lady: Three Bears and a Blondie"	Dave Wasson	November 20, 1999
Dot and Randy are off to the Natural History Museum for a field trip, but The Goose and Juanito are at it again with a story of Goldilocks and the 3 bears where the father plans horribly to eat Goldilocks.
12a	"ChalkZone: Rapunzel"	Bill Burnett and Larry Huber	December 4, 1999
Rudy, Penny, and Snap watch a stage production of Rapunzel starring Queen Rapsheeba.
12b	"Zoey's Zoo"	Amy Ellyn Anderson and David Burd	December 4, 1999
An animal loving girl named Zoey tries to adopt some Ocelots but ends up getting too many.
12c	"My Neighbor Was a Teenage Robot"	Rob Renzetti	December 4, 1999
After accidentally throwing the baseball into the window of a house next door, Brad Carbunkle sends his brother, Tuck, to retrieve the ball, but he meets a beautiful robot girl named XJ9 (she calls herself "Jenny"), who gives him the baseball, scaring him. Then, he tells his brother there is a robot inside, but he does not believe him. Jenny belongs to a scientist named Dr. Nora Wakeman, who wants her to save the world, but she meets Brad, sneaks out, and then hangs out, but Tuck is still afraid of her.
13a	"Jelly's Day: Auntie Broth's Makeover"	Greg Emison and Bill Burnett	December 18, 1999
Jelly takes her Aunt Broth to the mall for a makeover. The only problem is no one can touch her because she laughs hysterically and people have to run for cover. So, Jelly decides to perform open brain surgery right in the salon.
13b	"Terry & Chris"	John Reynolds	December 18, 1999
Problems are caused when a boy brings in a parrot with him.
13c	"Mina & The Count: Frankenfrog"	Rob Renzetti	December 18, 1999
Mina brings a school's dissection frog back to life.

==== Season 3 (2002) ====
Hosted by Josh Server.

No.	Title	Created by	Original release date
1a	"The Fairly OddParents: Super Humor"	Butch Hartman	June 6, 2002 (Nicktoons TV)
Timmy, wanting to be a superhero, tries out superpowers.
1b	"The Boy Who Cried Alien"	Guy Vasilovich	June 6, 2002 (Nicktoons TV); August 30, 2002 (Nickelodeon)
1c	"Jamal, the Funny Frog: Dentist"	Pat Ventura	June 6, 2002 (Nicktoons TV)
2a	"Super Santa: South Pole Joe"	Mike Bell	March 30, 2002
2b	"Sick and Tired: Bug Bite"	Andre Nieves and Ric Delcarmen	March 30, 2002
Two roommates and plumbers named Sick and Tired have to retrieve a ring from their neighbor's sink, but an annoying mosquito makes the task difficult for them.
2c	"Tales from the Goose Lady: The Ugly Duck-Thing"	Dave Wasson	March 30, 2002
3a	"The Fairly OddParents: Scout's Honor"	Butch Hartman	April 6, 2002
Cosmo and Wanda try to help Timmy capture Bigfoot to earn his Squirrel Scout badge in capturing a mythical creature.
3b	"Skippy Spankerton"	Eric Bryan and Michelle Bryan	April 6, 2002
3c	"Jamal, the Funny Frog: Beach"	Pat Ventura	April 6, 2002
4a	"Super Santa: Vegetation"	Mike Bell	April 13, 2002
4b	"Elise"	Guy Vasilovich	April 13, 2002
4c	"A Kid's Life: Picture Perfect"	Ken Kessel	April 13, 2002
5a	"The Fairly OddParents: The Really Bad Day!"	Butch Hartman	June 9, 2002 (Nicktoons TV)
For one day in a certain number of years, a fairy godparent has to be "bad," and it is Cosmo's turn to do so. However, Cosmo fails constantly at being "bad." Timmy and Wanda try to help him, enlisting help from conqueror Genghis Khan to teach him how to be bad, but soon, Cosmo plans to blow up the Earth.
5b	"Baxter & Bananas"	Zac Moncrief	June 9, 2002 (Nicktoons TV); July 12, 2002 (Nickelodeon)
5c	"Tales from the Goose Lady: The Fisherman, the Fisherman's Wife and the Fish"	Dave Wasson	June 9, 2002 (Nicktoons TV); August 2, 2002 (Nickelodeon)
6a	"Dan Danger: Danger 101"	Butch Hartman and Steve Marmel	March 23, 2002
6b	"The Tantrum"	John Fountain	March 23, 2002
6c	"Super Santa: Naughty"	Mike Bell	March 23, 2002
7a	"Dan Danger: A Lighter Shade of Danger"	Butch Hartman and Steve Marmel	June 10, 2002 (Nicktoons TV); July 19, 2002 (Nickelodeon)
7b	"The Kameleon Kid"	Jamie Diaz and Russ Mooney	June 10, 2002 (Nicktoons TV); July 26, 2002 (Nickelodeon)
7c	"Jamal the Funny Frog: Camping"	Pat Ventura	June 10, 2002 (Nicktoons TV); August 16, 2002 (Nickelodeon)
8a	"Dan Danger: A Date with Danger"	Butch Hartman and Steve Marmel	June 10, 2002 (Nicktoons TV); August 23, 2002 (Nickelodeon)
8b	"The Semprini Triplets"	Pat Ventura	June 10, 2002 (Nicktoons TV); August 9, 2002 (Nickelodeon)
8c	"Tales from the Goose Lady: Dot and Randy's Sad Tale of Woe"	Dave Wasson	June 10, 2002 (Nicktoons TV)

== The Meth Minute 39 (2007–2008) ==
The Meth Minute 39 had 39 original short cartoons and one bonus short, and was Frederator's fourth cartoon incubator. Production supervision was by series creator Fred Seibert, all individual cartoons were created by Dan Meth and produced by Carrie Miller, for exhibition on Channel Frederator. The shorts are listed in the order that they originally aired.

The spin-off series was "Nite Fite".

=== List of episodes ===
Episode	Title	Creator/Director	Air Date
1	Internet People	Dan Meth	September 5, 2007
2	Sex Machine	Dan Meth	September 28, 2007
3	Is Rush Heavy Metal? "Nite Fite"	Dan Meth	October 11, 2007
4	Dog Video Dating	Dan Meth	October 18, 2007
5	Mike Tyson's Brunch Out!!	Dan Meth	October 23, 2007
6	The Music Nerds	Dan Meth	November 1, 2007
7	Ultra and the Lazer Hearts	Dan Meth	November 8, 2007
8	Pink Floyd's Syd Barrett Visits His Accountant	Dan Meth	November 15, 2007
9	Beef and Stu in "PEZ Power"	Dan Meth	November 21, 2007
10	Cavalcade of Laffs	Dan Meth	November 29, 2007
11	Watermelon Nights	Dan Meth	December 4, 2007
12	The Craigs	Dan Meth	December 13, 2007
13	Seasons Greetings From The Meth Minute 39	Dan Meth	December 20, 2007
14	Beef & Stu in "Mustard Water"	Dan Meth	December 27, 2007
15	P-COK Hip Hop Video	Dan Meth	January 3, 2008
16	Sid and Nancy in "Hotel Heartbreak"	Dan Meth	January 10, 2008
17	Drinking & Drawing	Dan Meth	January 17, 2008
18	Foreign Cartoon About Hands	Dan Meth	January 23, 2008
19	Endless Poop in "Cavalcade of Laffs 2"	Dan Meth	January 30, 2008
20	Space Cowboy on Mars	Dan Meth	February 7, 2008
21	Rejected Kid-Show Ideas! Not For Kids!	Dan Meth	February 14, 2008
22	Bob Meets The Beatles	Dan Meth	February 20, 2008
23	The Music Nerds Do Karaoke	Dan Meth	February 28, 2008
24	Hollywood Stars in Japanese Commercials: Japandering	Dan Meth	March 6, 2008
25	Fake Reality Show: The Palms	Dan Meth	March 13, 2008
26	Space Cowboy on the Moon	Dan Meth	March 20, 2008
27	Wang Warriors	Dan Meth	March 27, 2008
28	The Craigs Phone It In	Dan Meth	April 3, 2008
29	Alan Kaufman: Rock N Roll Accountant	Dan Meth	April 10, 2008
30	Stu's Song	Dan Meth	April 17, 2008
31	Ultra & the Lazer Hearts: Throat Duel!	Dan Meth	April 24, 2008
32	Emomelon Days	Dan Meth	May 1, 2008
33	8-Bit	Dan Meth	May 8, 2008
34	Fan Fiction	Dan Meth	May 15, 2008
35	Viewer Calls	Dan Meth	May 22, 2008
36	Space Cowboy on Earth	Dan Meth	May 29, 2008
37	Company Picnic	Dan Meth	June 5, 2008
38	If The Meth Minute Never Ended: The Meth Minute 39 Thousand	Dan Meth	June 12, 2008
39	We Were the Meth Minute	Dan Meth	June 19, 2008
Bonus	Secrets of the Space Cowboy	Dan Meth	June 26, 2008
Bonus	The Stoic Squirrel in the Big City	Dan Meth	July 10, 2008

== Random! Cartoons (2008–2009) ==
The original 39 Random! Cartoons shorts were supervised by series creator Fred Seibert and produced by Eric Homan and Kevin Kolde as Frederator Studios's third cartoon incubator for Nickelodeon. The shorts are listed in the order that they originally aired.

The only series greenlit from this incubator was Fanboy & Chum Chum. Adventure Time and Bravest Warriors were respectively later picked up by Cartoon Network and self-produced.

No.	Title	Created by	Cast	Series/Short	Original release date
1a	"Solomon Fix"	Doug TenNapel	Rob Paulsen as Solomon Fix; John DiMaggio as Mumpy; Maurice LaMarche as Klemp; Elijah Runcorn as Ned; Doug TenNapel as Chipmunk #1 & 2	Short	December 6, 2008
A teddy bear named Solomon Fix is assigned to protect a child named Ned, only that the child finds him lame.
1b	"MooBeard the Cow Pirate"	Kyle Carrozza	Billy West as MooBeard / Value Guy; Erica Luttrell as Sailor Bird / Road Show Announcer; Dave "Gruber" Allen as Darkblade of Fire; Kyle Carrozza as Ungus the Unpleasant / Cow Eating Gentleman	Short	December 6, 2008
A cow pirate named MooBeard along with his companion Sailor Bird searches the treasure of the lost island of Hookamookapookalap.
1c	"Two Witch Sisters"	Niki Yang	S. Scott Bullock as Dorothy / Hummingbird; Dee Bradley Baker as Carrot / Seymour; Candi Milo as Bee; Niki Yang as Baby Rabbit	Short	December 6, 2008
Twin witch sisters are causing magic-induced havoc at a park.
2a	"The Finster Finster Show: Store Wars"	Jeff DeGrandis	Billy West as Finster 1 Charlie Adler as Finster 2 Tress MacNeille as Finsters' Mom	Short	December 7, 2008
Two Finsters battle anthropomorphic frozen chickens in the supermarket.
2b	"Adventure Time"	Pendleton Ward	Zack Shada as Penn; John DiMaggio as Jake / Ice Clops; Paige Moss as Princess Bubblegum; John Kassir as Ice King / Fire Element; Dee Bradley Baker as Lady Rainicorn / Snow Golem; Pendleton Ward as Abraham Lincoln / Old Man	TV series	December 7, 2008
In this precursor to what would become the critically acclaimed full-length series, Finn (known as "Penn" in the short) and Jake battle the Ice King to save Princess Bubblegum.
2c	"Mind the Kitty"	Anne Walker Farrell	Dee Bradley Baker as the Duck/Tabby; Jeff Bennett as Punky; Rodger Bumpass as Lemurman; Lynne Maclean as Tabby's Mom	Short	December 7, 2008
Three teens have to babysit a psychotic kitten girl.
3a	"Ivan the Unbearable"	Andrew Dickman	Jeff Doucette as Ivan the Unbearable/Olaf; Maurice LaMarche as Bjorn/Working Troll #1; Tress MacNeille as Ma; Andrew Dickman as Filthy Viking/Working Troll #2	Short	December 13, 2008
A clumsy Viking gets hiccups that causes destruction.
3b	"Boneheads"	Hiroshi Chida	John Kassir as Bone/Soldier Flies; Dee Bradley Baker as Roccos/Audrey/Antarctic Bull Snail/Rex; Hadley Hudson as Striker (uncredited)	Short	December 13, 2008
Roccos and Bone search for babanas.
3c	"Tiffany"	Adam Henry	Jessie Flower as Peggy; Colleen Villard as Tiffany; David Busch as Dad/Jockey/Racetrack Announcer	Short	December 13, 2008
A doll must help her friend overcome a fear of horses.
4a	"Call Me Bessie!"	Diane Kredensor and Dana Galin	Audrey Wasilewski as Bessie; Fred Stoller as Al; Dee Bradley Baker as Senor Swampy/Turkey/Dolphins	Short	December 20, 2008
A cow enrolls her elephant friend in a scuba-diving class... but her friend does not want to go!
4b	"Teapot"	Greg Eagles	Greg Eagles as Teapot/James Brown Clock/Silkbone/Blind Guy/Body Guard; Cathy Lewis as Bouche; Hilda Boulware as Mother's Voice; Chara Hammonds as Video Vixen#1 & 2 deMann as Announcer	Short	December 20, 2008
Two African-American kids that are fans of rap music are going to meet a famous rapper.
4c	"Hornswiggle"	Jerry Beck	René Auberjonois as Hornswiggle/Apeman #2; Jeff Bennett as Zan-Tar/Apeman #1; Maurice LaMarche as Birdsdorf, Apeman #3; Cheryl Chase as Nurses #1 & 2	Short	December 20, 2008
A crazy rhino meets his hero, Zantar. He tries to help but physically hurts him.
5a	"Hero Heights"	Raul Aguirre Jr. and Bill Ho	Jessica DiCicco as Smart Alec/Plasma Tot; Annie Mumolo as Strikeout; Hynden Walch as Olympia/Ms. Chic; Raul Aguirre as Razorklaw; Becky Thyre as Electricia; Karen Malina White as Mindy 500	Short	December 27, 2008
In a town where everyone's a superhero, two best friends fight over the new girl in town.
5b	"Yaki & Yumi"	Aliki Theofilopoulous	André Sogliuzzo as Yaki/Contest Judge; Candi Milo as Yumi/Octopus Dude; Aliki Theofilopolous as Sweet Little Girl/Fortune Fish/Kid #1	Short	December 27, 2008
A bat and a dragon participate in a dance competition.
5c	"Gary Guitar"	Bill Plympton	Lloyd Floyd as Gary Guitar; Becky Poole as Vera Violin; Stephen Largay as Danny Drum	Short	December 27, 2008
A guitar tries to make the perfect picnic for his girlfriend, a violin.
6a	"Krunch and the Kid"	Adam Henry	Kevin Michael Richardson as Krunch/Rastamon/Alarm Clock/Announcer; Colleen Villard as Skippy/Little Girl/Some Kid; Mark Hamill as Frank; Karen Henry as Perky Tour Guide	Short	January 3, 2009
A monster named Krunch has trouble performing on a TV show after his pet frog dies.
6b	"Bradwurst"	Angelo Di Nallo and Jason Plapp	Tom Kenny as Bradwurst/Jerry; Raphael Sbarge as Willy; Jeff Bennett as Charlie; J. P. Manoux as Gus	Short	January 3, 2009
A grumpy sausage sabotages his friends' party.
6c	"Dr. Froyd's Funny Farm"	Bill Burnett and Jaime Diaz	Robert Cait as Dr. Froyd; Nika Futterman as Lulu; Candi Milo as Nurse Duckett; Charlie Adler as Bossy LeCow/Raging Bullfrog	Short	January 3, 2009
Dr. Froyd needs someone to test out a science experiment, but none of the animals on his funny farm want to!
7a	"The Bravest Warriors"	Pendleton Ward	Charlie Schlatter as Chris; Tara Strong as Beth; Dan Finnerty as Wallow; Rob Paulsen as Danny; Polly Lou Livingston as Slippy Napkins; Noah Nelson as Professor Brain Dog 7	Web series	January 10, 2009
Four human teens, Chris, Beth, Wallow and Danny, save the brain dogs from the tickle monster in outer space.
7b	"Giovanni and Navarro, The Dangerous Duck Brothers: Saps at the Wheel"	Pat Ventura	Jim MacGeorge as Giovanni; Chuck McCann as Navarro; Jeff Bennett as Dog	Short	January 10, 2009
Two ducks want to break a dangerous record.
7c	"Sparkles and Gloom"	Melissa Wolfe and Anne Walker Farrell	Kari Wahlgren as Sparkles/Mom/Leprechaun; Jessica DiCicco as Gloom/Fuzzy Animal; Kevin Michael Richardson as Dad / Announcer / Zit / Applause Fish; Annie Mumolo as Pixie / Little Prince / Munchie	Short	January 10, 2009
Sparkles and Gloom, two daughters of a handsome prince and an evil witch, have their powers switched before the talent show at the Geevil School, the good and evil school, where good and evil are best friends.
8a	"The Infinite Goliath"	Erik Knutson and Mike Gray	Kevin Michael Richardson as Infinite Goliath/Hondo/Mechaneck; Alanna Ubach as Roger/Mrs. Abbott/Samantha; S. Scott Bullock as Mr. Abbott/Dr. Carnage/Timmy	Short	January 17, 2009
The Infinite Goliath, a super villain released on parole, moves into a neighborhood.
8b	"Kyle + Rosemary"	Jun Falkenstein	Wil Wheaton as Kyle/Sir Horace; Jentle Phoenix as Rosemary/Lunarella; Alexander Polinsky as Harold/Elf; Charlie Schlatter as Willy/Gnome/Martin/Dwarf; Aliki Theofilopoulous as Crimson	Short	January 17, 2009
A geek and a goth who play MMORPG games must break their shells to be together.
8c	"Garlic Boy"	John R. Dilworth	Gary Littman as Garlic Boy; Gerrianne Raphael as Garlic Boy's Mom; Erik Bergmann as Garlic Boy's Dad; Betsy Beutler as Parsley; Lloyd Floyd as Fungus; John R. Dilworth as Twin #1/Twin #2	Short	January 17, 2009
An anthropomorphic garlic with a healing tonic wants to do good for folks.
9a	"Flavio"	Mike Milo	Rob Paulsen as Flavio; Robert Costanzo as Bossman; Stephen Stanton as Mr. Frank; John Mariano as Leonardo da Vinci/Mayor	Short	January 24, 2009
An Italian goat wishes to be an inventor.
9b	"SamSquatch"	Adam Muto	Max Burkholder as SamSquatch; Daran Norris as Conrad Conard; Dee Bradley Baker as Nessie, Karl, Momsquatch; Ja'net DuBois as Mom	Short	January 24, 2009
A cryptid hunter finds a Bigfoot named SamSquatch.
9c	"Girls on the Go: First Date"	Aliki Theofilopoulous	Danica McKellar as Kat; Frankie Ingrassia as Tess; Quinton Flynn as Spencer Applebaum/Spencer Spencerson/Student; LaTonya Holmes; Aliki Theofilopoulos	Short	January 24, 2009
Katerina Metropolis is a hopeless romantic teenager that daydreams about meeting the perfect boy. But how will she manage after she winds up on the worst date of her life?
10a	"Victor the Delivery Dog"	Niki Yang	E.G. Daily as Victor/One-Eyed Bird/Co-Worker #1; Jennifer Hale as Victor's Mom/Express Mail/Co-Worker #3; S. Scott Bullock as Gi/Raffe/Co-Worker #2; Fred Tatasciore as Mr. Papier	Short	January 31, 2009
Victor has to make deliveries before dinnertime.
10b	"The Bronk and Bongo Show: Losing Patients"	Manny Galán and Alan Goodman	Steve Purnick as Bronk/Dinosaur; Joel McCrary as Bongo/Skeleton; Adam Busch as Jerry/Orderly; Jeff Bennett as Patient/Geezer/Workman; Manny Galan as Angry Erik; Alan Goodman as Ted Strawberry Head	Short	January 31, 2009
Bronk and Bongo are a couple of dogs who are mistaken to be world-famous German doctors in this madcap, zany romp.
10c	"Thom Cat"	Mike Gray	Jim Meskimen as Thom Cat/Neighbor John/Stumpy; Annie Mumolo as Melissa/Rusty/Patch	Short	January 31, 2009
A talking cat (surprising to everyone) helps a troubled girl from a bully.
11a	"Sugarfoot"	Erik Knutson	Charlie Schlatter as Sugarfoot; Dee Bradley Baker as Socko and Delivery Man; Jennifer Hale as Ms. Penelope	Short	April 4, 2009
A boy who is a fan of cowboys and dinosaurs goes to a field trip to a museum with both of his interests while dealing with a bully.
11b	"Dugly Uckling's Treasure Quest"	Guy Vasilovich	John Kassir as Dugly Uckling/Kung Pao Bunny; Carlos Alazraqui as Quiggins/Bobblehead; James Sie as Narrator/Monkeybutt	Short	April 4, 2009
Dugly Uckling and his ragtag crew are out to solve the mystery of the Golden Bobblehead. Battling their way through the swamp, jungles, and killer mosquitoes, they come to a place where only Dugly's nonsensical logic can save the day.
11c	"Dr. Dee & BitBoy"	Jun-Kyo Seo, Kong-Yo Kang, and Larry Huber	Phil Nee as Dr. Dee/Bomba; Brett Pels as Zero (Bitboy)/Flower Wicky/Shop Owner; Jennie Kwan as Myang Myang/Bitgirl/Edu; Maurice LaMarche as Pickle Cop/Elecaptain Sam/Dog Catcher; Charles Kim as Black Violet; Lloyd Sherr as Narrator	Short	April 4, 2009
Two kids and a scientist in a dog suit stop a corporation from creating a donut addiction.
12a	"Super John Doe Junior"	Lincoln Peirce	Jim Connor as Super John Doe; John Zee as Mayor; Marc Graue as Anchorman; Betsy Foldes as Mom; Kimberly Brooks as Super John Doe, Jr. David Shaughnessey as Blimey; Sandy Fox as Robin; Andy Morris as Evil Butthead	Short	April 11, 2009
The son of a superhero, who has no powers, decided to take his dad's place and fight against his nemesis.
12b	"6 Monsters"	Fred Seibert and Alan Goodman	Jeff Bennett as Grandpa/Gaillard; Chuck McCann as Buck; John DiMaggio as Roy; Nika Futterman as Cathy; Teresa Ganzel as Lulu	Short	April 11, 2009
Adventures of six monsters in middle school presented in traditional animation, computer generated imagery, Flash animation and digital ink and paint.
12c	"Ratz-A-Fratz"	Jim Wyatt and Karl Toerge	Jess Harnell as Crank/Man at Cookie Nook; June Foray as Mall Walker/Old Man #1/Man at Garbage Can; Debi Derryberry as Pop Singer/Teen at Cookie Nook; Scott Fresina as Urban; Jim Wyatt as Cyrus; Don Cameron as Swuawk/Old Man #2	Short	April 11, 2009
Three hungry rats must escape a security guard.
13a	"Lance & Zoopie: Squirly Town"	Doug TenNapel	Stephen Root as Lance; Bobcat Goldthwait as Zoopie; Keone Young as Flashback Lance & Zoopie	Short	August 16, 2009
A sly hyperactive squirrel takes his germaphobe strait-laced friend on an adventure to clear his aching head.
13b	"Fanboy"	Eric Robles	David Hornsby as Fanboy; Nancy Cartwright as Chum-Chum; Don LaFontaine as Announcer; Jeff Bennett as Fanman, Lenny; Kevin Michael Richardson as The Ice Monster	TV series	November 28, 2009
Two kids in superhero costumes purchase their favorite drink and end up creating an ice monster.
13c	"HandyCat: Bees-ness As Usual"	Russ Harris and G. Brian Reynolds	Rob Paulsen as Handycat/Drillbit; June Foray as Woman	Short	December 20, 2009
On their first day on the job, a handyman feline and his dog try to get rid of some pesky bees in hoping for a second job.

== Too Cool! Cartoons (2013–2014) ==
There were 11 Too Cool! Cartoons, Frederator Studios' fifth cartoon incubator, produced by Eric Homan and Kevin Kolde at Frederator Studios in Burbank. Exhibited at Cartoon Hangover. The shorts are listed in the order that they originally aired.

Spin-off series were Bee & PuppyCat (Cartoon Hangover and Netflix) and Dead End: Paranormal Park (Netflix).

Episode	Title	Creator	Director	Air Date	Cast
101	Our New Electrical Morals	Mike Rosenthal	Kenny Pittenger	April 4, 2013	Fred Tatasciore, Johnny Hawkes, Audrey Wasilewski, Kari Wahlgren
102	Rocket Dog	Mel Roach	Mel Roach	May 2, 2013	Mel Roach, Josh Lawson, Steven Blum, Kari Wahlgren
103	Ace Discovery	Tom Gran & Martin Woolley	Tom Gran & Martin Woolley	May 30, 2013	Ako Mitchell, Hugo Harold-Harrison, Eric Meyers, Doireann Ní Chorragáin, Martin Woolley
104	Bee and PuppyCat: Part 1	Natasha Allegri	Larry Leichliter	July 11, 2013	Allyn Rachel, Kent Osborne, Tom Kenny
105	Bee and PuppyCat: Part 2	Natasha Allegri	Larry Leichliter	August 9, 2013	Allyn Rachel, Frank Gibson, Marina Sirtis
106	Doctor Lollipop	Kelly Martin	Aliki Grafft	September 12, 2013	Chris Diamantopoulos, Dee Baker, Rose McGowan, Jason Marsden, Travis Willingham
107	Dead End	Hamish Steele	Mel Roach	June 26, 2014	Zack Pearlman, Cameron Goodman, Stefan Marks, Maria Bamford
108	Chainsaw Richard	Christopher Reineman	Tom King	July 17, 2014	Tyler Merna, Ashly Burch, Eric Bauza, River Jordan
109	Manly	Jesse Moynihan & Justin Moynihan	Jesse Moynihan & Justin Moynihan	July 31, 2014	Jill Bartlett, Joey Richter, Steve Agee, Roger Craig Smith
110	SpaceBear	Andy Helms	Dave Ferguson	August 14, 2014	Rodger Bumpass, Christopher Curry, Ogie Banks, Josh Keaton
111	Blackford Manor	Jiwook Kim	Jiwook Kim	August 28, 2014	Ashly Burch, Martin Rayner, Billy West

== GO! Cartoons (2017–2018) ==
The 12 GO! Cartoons was Frederator Studios' sixth cartoon incubator, produced by Eric Homan and Kevin Kolde, in conjunction with Sony Pictures Animation. Exhibited at Cartoon Hangover and Cartoon Hangover Select on Ellation's VRV subscription platform. The shorts are listed in the order that they originally aired.

Spin-off series will be announced in the second half of 2018.

No.	Title	Directed by	Created and Written by	Release date	Ref
1	"The Summoning"	Natasha Allegri	Elyse Castro	November 7, 2017	
Claire the witch needs troll fat for her brew, so she ends up going on an adventure with her cat Edgar.
2	"Boots"	Larry Huber	David Cowles & Alison Cowles	November 21, 2017	
Boots desires the chair discarded by her neighbor Chad, but does not want him to notice.
3	"City Dwellers"	Grant Kolton	Grant Kolton	December 5, 2017	
Dog walkers Bruce and Biff are asked by Nina to avoid certain areas since her dog Marty is a ninja. When they get distracted by a sandwich shop, Marty goes on the loose, and they have to retrieve him.
4	"Rachel and Her Grandfather Control the Island"	Jonni Peppers	Jonni Peppers	December 19, 2017	
Rachel and her grandfather want to take over the island by installing surveillance equipment robots out of their trash cans, but they first have to convince the president to get rid of the law banning trash cans.
5	"Nebulous"	Larry Huber	Brent Sievers	January 2, 2018	
A trio of space delivery folks stop by a grease planet for food.
6	"Welcome to Doozy"	Kathleen Good	Kate Tsang & Jennifer Suhr	January 16, 2018	
Ex tries to impress her work crush Skeletim with a bento, but when it gets enchanted by her friend Lou, it becomes an out-of-control monster.
7	"Both Brothers"	Larry Huber	Juris Lisovs	January 30, 2018	
Brothers Tod and Klod are upset that the snow park is closed because the weather is too nice, so they tell the sun to go away. However, when the sun does just that, it gets really cold and the crowd becomes angry. The two brothers try to apologize to the sun.
8	"The Bagheads: Get Trashed"	Michelle Bryan	D.R. Beitzel	February 13, 2018	
Paperbag-faced siblings Artemis and Elbow compete over who has to take out the trash using the rule that if their addition to the trash stack falls to the floor they lose.
9	"Tyler & Co."	Gabe Janisz	Gabe Janisz	February 27, 2018	
Tyler the Liger has a enough box tops to become the Mayor of Cereal Town, but he needs to find a way out of the house that has been locked by its upside down door to mail them in.
10	"Kid Arthur"	Larry Huber	Joel Veitch & David Shute	March 13, 2018	
Arthur and his friend/arch-nemesis Mordred continue their battle while trying to do a test in school.
11	"Thrashin' USA"	Tom King	Rory Panagotopulos	March 27, 2018	
While on his way to the skate park, skater Pau gets trapped in his grumpy next door neighbor Mrs. Tracy's house and is force to do her skateboard arena of death by her.
12	"Pottyhorse"	Larry Huber	Damien Barchowsky & Jeff Drake	April 10, 2018	
Pottyhorse the town's sheriff and only toilet has to find a way to stop a poopsteorid from hitting the town.

== Frederator Digital's Mini-Series (2018) ==
Frederator Digital's Mini-Series are produced by Carrie Miller and executive produced by Fred Seibert. Originally exhibited on Cartoon Hangover Select on the VRV subscription platform, they are all available on Cartoon Hangover on YouTube.

No.	Title	Created by	Cast	Series/Short	Original release date
1–5	"Slug Riot"	Mike Rosenthal	Glenn Wool: Slug Riot; DeAnne Smith: Georgia; Justin McElroy: Very Deadward; Desiree Burch: Shannon; Kerry Shale: Additional voices	Shorts	April 16, 2018
"Slug Riot" tells the story of legendary, self-destructive guitarist Slug Riot. His little sister Georgia desperately wants to reform the band, but Slug Riot just wants to come home to rot.
1–6	"Chris P. Duck"	Ralph Kidson	Chris: Alex Brooker; Tracey: Diane Morgan; Roger Matt King	Shorts	July 26, 2018
Chris finds a lost phone and immediately becomes best friends with it. Tracey wants to kill it before its human host shows up and destroys them all.
1–3	"(not) Hero"	Liz Chun	Ashton Frank: Heromy; Adam Hess: Loman; Liz Chun: Missie; Kimberly Persona: Seer; Additional voices: Kerry Shale	Shorts	June 13, 2018
In a world where you're destined to be the hero, what happens when you'd rather (not)Hero? Heromy's about to find out.
