= Yabba Dabba Doo! =

1986 video game

- Cover art (Commodore 64 version)
- Developer: Taskset
- Publisher: Quicksilva
- Series: The Flintstones
- Platforms: Amstrad CPC, Commodore 64, ZX Spectrum
- Release: EU: 1986
- Mode: Single-player

Yabba Dabba Doo! is a 1986 video game developed by British studio Taskset and published by Quicksilva for the Amstrad CPC, Commodore 64 (C64), and ZX Spectrum. It is based on the television series The Flintstones and is the first Flintstones video game.

== Gameplay ==
Yabba Dabba Doo! is set before the marriage of Fred and Wilma Flintstone, during a time when the city of Bedrock was beginning to take shape. Playing as Fred, the player's goal is to build a house and persuade Wilma to move in with Fred, leading to their marriage. The player begins with a plot of land that is covered in small rocks, which must be carried off one at a time and dumped into a nearby pit. Enemies include pterodactyls that try to drop rocks on Fred's head, and turtles and dinosaurs which harm Fred directly. After clearing the rocks from the land, the player then searches Bedrock for boulders, which are used to build the house. Once the house is ready for a roof to be added, the player must get a job at a quarry in order to raise money to hire a dinosaur service, which will allow Fred to reach the top of the house. Throughout the game, Fred must meet with Wilma whenever he comes across her, in order to fill a heart meter which demonstrates her love for him. When the house is complete, the player must find Wilma and get her to follow Fred to the new house, which she will only do if the heart meter is full. Kissing Wilma is also the player's only way to refill the health bar.

Bedrock is represented through various screens. The player can move left and right to maneuver between screens located along the same path. Accessing upper and lower screens is done by moving diagonally towards the corner edge of each screen, rather than walking straight up or down. Located within Bedrock is Fred's car, which provides faster transportation between screens if it is found by the player. Buildings in Bedrock include a service station, a burger bar, a drive-in movie theater, and a health club, with the latter three locations being popular hangouts for Wilma. Fred's neighbors are building their own houses, and the player earns bonus points if Fred's house is finished before the others.

== Reception ==
Reception

Review scores
Publication	Score
Crash	81% (ZX Spectrum)
Computer and Video Games	9/10 (C64)
Sinclair User	2/5 (ZX Spectrum)
Your Sinclair	8/10 (ZX Spectrum)
Zzap!64	60% (C64)
Your Computer	4/5 (ZX Spectrum)

The Commodore 64 and ZX Spectrum versions were generally praised for their graphics, with Computer and Video Games (CVG) writing that Fred "looks as if he's walked directly off the cartoon 'set' and into the computer game." However, some reviewers considered the graphics of the ZX Spectrum version to be poor. The game received criticism for the method used to move Fred diagonally between screens, which was considered difficult and confusing. Some critics believed the game would have particular appeal for fans of the television series, while others believed that the game lacked lasting appeal. CVG and Crash offered praise for the sound, although the latter also considered it sparse.

Computer Gamer, in its review of the C64 version, praised the game's concept but considered the enemies too aggressive. The review criticized the lack of weapons to use against enemies, and stated that this along with Fred's "awkward" movements between screens "contributed to spoil the whole game." In its review of the ZX Spectrum version, Computer Gamer stated that it had poor playability and was not as colorful as the C64 version, but that its enemies were less hostile.

Zzap!64 considered the game to be average and criticized its gameplay, while Commodore Horizons considered it fun. Your Commodore considered the game annoying, while ZX Computing stated that it lacked the fun and action of the television series. Your Sinclair considered it "a very addictive game once you get the idea of what you're supposed to do."
