= Yabba Dabba Dinosaurs =

American animated television series

- Genre: Comedy
- Based on: The Flintstones by William Hanna and Joseph Barbera
- Developed by: Mark Marek; Marly Halpern-Graser
- Voices of: Jessica DiCicco; Ely Henry; Jeff Bergman; Tress MacNeille; Kevin Michael Richardson; Grey Griffin; Eric Bauza; Tom Megalis
- Theme music composer: Mark Marek
- Opening theme: "Big Bang" by Mark Marek
- Country of origin: United States
- Original language: English
- No. of seasons: 2
- No. of episodes: 26

Production
- Executive producer: Sam Register
- Producers: Mark Marek; Marly Halpern-Graser
- Editor: Ian Duncan
- Running time: 22 minutes (2 11-minute segments)
- Production company: Warner Bros. Animation

Original release
- Network: HBO Max
- Release: September 30, 2021 – February 17, 2022

Related
- The Rubbles; Bedrock; The Flintstones

Yabba Dabba Dinosaurs is an American animated television series and a spin-off of the original series, The Flintstones. Like Cave Kids, the series focuses on the lives of best friends Pebbles Flintstone and Bamm-Bamm Rubble, who are joined by Dino for many adventures in the Stone Age. The series premiered on HBO Max on September 30, 2021. The series was removed from HBO Max in August 2022.

This is the first full-length Flintstones TV series in 19 years since The Rubbles and the first since the closure of the Hanna-Barbera studio and also the first Flintstones TV series without the original creators, William Hanna and Joseph Barbera, who both died respectively in 2001 and 2006.

== Cast ==
- Jessica DiCicco as Pebbles Flintstone
- Ely Henry as Bamm-Bamm Rubble
- Jeff Bergman as Fred Flintstone, Mr. Slate
- Tress MacNeille as Wilma Flintstone
- Kevin Michael Richardson as Barney Rubble
- Grey Griffin as Betty Rubble
- Eric Bauza as Dino, The Great Gazoo
- Tom Megalis as Captain Caveman

== Production ==
Yabba Dabba Dinosaurs first started production in 2016. The series was first announced in May 2018 with a planned release date for 2019, with plans to be released on the Boomerang subscription service. An animatic from the series was uploaded in August 2018. In September 2018, the episode "The Grass Is Always Dinner" was included as part of a survey from Boomerang's newsletter. The episode was later leaked and shared by various websites.

The series was intended to have two seasons, but in December 2018, character designer Will Terrell said that Yabba Dabba Dinosaurs would not be renewed for a second season.

=== Release ===
On August 19, 2021, as part of HBO Max's reveal of content released for September 2021, it was announced that Yabba Dabba Dinosaurs would be premiering on HBO Max as an original series on September 30. On January 20, 2022, as part of HBO Max's reveal of content released for February 2022, it was announced that the remaining episodes, marketed as the second season, would be released on February 17.

== Episodes ==
=== Series overview ===
Season	Episodes	Originally released
1	13	September 30, 2021
2	13	February 17, 2022

=== Season 1 (2021) ===
No. overall	No. in season	Title	Directed by	Written by	Original release date
1	1	"Mistaking Sides"	Mark Marek	Bryan Condon	September 30, 2021 (Note: This episode premiered on Boomerang in the UK and Ireland on 3 February 2020.)
On a fishing trip to Crags Lake, Pebbles and Bamm-Bamm try to get away from their arguing parents, Fred and Barney, but they end up getting pulled into the middle of an age-old feud between two rival species of dinosaurs.
2	2	"Rock Me, Plantasaurus"	Mark Marek	Dick Grunert	September 30, 2021
Bamm-Bamm brings home a rare plant from the Crags as a last-minute birthday gift for his mom, but he starts to suspect that the plant may want something in return, to eat him!
3	3	"Yabba-Dabba-Dabba Kamma-Kamma-Chameleon"	Mark Marek	Bryan Condon	September 30, 2021 (Note: This episode premiered on Boomerang in the UK and Ireland on 4 February 2020.)
Pebbles accidentally leads a shape-shifting dinosaur from the Crags back to Bedrock and when it starts posing as different friends and family members, the results could change the course of their lives forever.
4	4	"Treehouse Blues"	Mark Marek	Lesley Tsina	September 30, 2021 (Note: This episode premiered on Boomerang in the UK and Ireland on 5 February 2020.)
When an incredibly friendly but obnoxiously noisy dinosaur, Soprana moves in next to the treehouse, Pebbles and Bamm-Bamm would rather build a whole new clubhouse than have to ask her to be quiet, but with every attempt as making a new clubhouse, they only miss their treehouse even more.
5	5	"Yabba Dabba Don't"	Todd Dejong; Mark Marek	Patrick Rieger	September 30, 2021 (Note: This episode premiered on Boomerang in the UK and Ireland on 6 February 2020.)
Pebbles and Bamm-Bamm are grounded after leading a giant Beeasaurus from the Crags to Fred's work, but when they then lead it home as well, they have to try and get rid of the stinging beast before they're discovered and grounded again, this time for good.
6	6	"Alien vs. Pebbles"	Todd Dejong; Erik Knutson	Joan Ford	September 30, 2021 (Note: This episode premiered on Boomerang in the UK and Ireland on 7 February 2020.)
A mysterious otherworldly hunter is kidnapping dinosaurs from the Crags and Pebbles will do anything to chase it down and stop it, even if she loses all her friends in the process.
7	7	"Gonna Fly Now"	Zach Smith	Rachel Hastings	September 30, 2021 (Note: This episode premiered on Boomerang in the UK and Ireland on 10 February 2020.)
Pebbles makes a dinosaur's dream of flying come true, but the dinosaur uses her new power to wreak havoc and revenge on all those who used to mock her dreams.
8	8	"The Grass Is Always Dinner"	Erik Knutson	Steve Clemmons	September 30, 2021 (Note: This episode premiered on Boomerang in the UK and Ireland on 11 February 2020.)
Bamm-Bamm runs off to the Crags to get out of doing work around the house. Pebbles offers to help a dinosaur in need.
9	9	"Dawn of the Disposals"	Mark Marek; Zach Smith	Joan Ford	September 30, 2021
On Halloween night, a weird new health food turns all of Bedrock's garbage disposals into starving zombies.
10	10	"Agony Alley"	Erik Knutson; Zach Smith	Dick Grunert	September 30, 2021 (Note: This episode premiered on Boomerang in the UK and Ireland on 12 February 2020.)
Pebbles and Bamm-Bamm take a shortcut through a mysterious part of the Crags, rumored to be home to terrifying and dangerous dinosaurs.
11	11	"Dino Holds Barred"	Erik Knutson; Zach Smith	Joan Ford	September 30, 2021 (Note: This episode premiered on Boomerang in the UK and Ireland on 13 February 2020.)
When some other dinosaurs make fun of Dino for being a pampered pet, Pebbles tries to prove them all wrong by entering him into a contest to show he's as tough as any dinosaur.
12	12	"The Spirit of Frostnos"	Todd Dejong	Marly Halpern-Graser	September 30, 2021 (Note: This episode premiered on Boomerang in the UK and Ireland on 14 February 2020.)
When the dinosaurs of the Crags see signs that the first frost of the year is coming, they all set out to celebrate, but when the different dinosaurs all have contradicting traditions that directly conflict with one another, Pebbles and Bamm-Bamm have to find a way to make everyone happy before a war breaks out.
13	13	"Invasion of the Trendsetters"	Todd Dejong; Erik Knutson	Cait Raft	September 30, 2021 (Note: This episode premiered on Boomerang in the UK and Ireland on 17 February 2020.)
Pebbles suspects a new fashion trend from the Crags is actually a form of mind control and tries to stop it.

=== Season 2 (2022) ===
No. overall	No. in season	Title	Directed by	Written by	Original release date
14	1	"Bammnesia"	Mark Marek; Zach Smith	Lacey Dyer; Julie Layton	February 17, 2022 (Note: This episode premiered on Boomerang in the UK and Ireland on 18 February 2020.)
Bamm-Bamm wakes up in the Crags next to a giant crater where the treehouse used to be and with no memory of the night before, now he and Pebbles have to retrace his steps in order to figure out what happened and if they can get their clubhouse back.
15	2	"The Rocks and the Rolliest"	Todd Dejong	Justin Becker	February 17, 2022
Pebbles and Bamm-Bamm get recruited into an underground rock racing league in the Crags.
16	3	"Dino Whisperer"	Erik Knutson; Zach Smith	Mike McCafferty	February 17, 2022
Dino is taken to a special obedience school to help stop his increasingly bad behavior, but when he returns he isn't the same and Pebbles and Bamm-Bamm have to figure out how to get back that spark of rambunctious life that makes Dino, Dino.
17	4	"Dinosaurs with Angel Faces"	Todd Dejong	Bryan Condon	February 17, 2022
Bamm-Bamm thinks he's helping protect an armadillo after his shell broke, but he's actually being duped into using his club and super strength as an enforcer for the dinosaur mafia.
18	5	"The Puddle Sitters Club"	Todd Dejong; Erik Knutson	Ethan Nicolle	February 17, 2022
Pebbles is forced to babysit the infant daughter of a family friend.
19	6	"Doppel Dino"	Todd Dejong	Steve Clemmons; Marly Halpern-Graser	February 17, 2022
Dino meets a dinosaur in the Crags who looks exactly like him but he can talk.
20	7	"Pave Crag-adise"	Erik Knutson; Zach Smith	Rachel Hastings	February 17, 2022
A Businessaurus breezes into the Crags and all the dinosaurs get swept up by his buzz words and smooth lifestyle.
21	8	"Art Attack"	Todd Dejong	Candie Kelty Langdale	February 17, 2022
Pebbles picks up painting as a new hobby, but a paranoid Doomasaurus convinces the dinosaurs of the Crags that her artwork is evil magic.
22	9	"Over My Shed Body"	Erik Knutson; Zach Smith	Steve Clemmons	February 17, 2022
Bamm-Bamm meets Molty, a dinosaur that can shed its skin. She invites him to play pranks on other people with her tricks. At some point, even Bamm-Bamm goes too far. At the same time, Pebbles helps the pack dinosaur, Paxtin, who can no longer find his pack. But she is distracted by Bamm-Bamm's new acquaintance.
23	10	"Goo-rillas in the Mist"	Todd Dejong	Justin Becker	February 17, 2022
Bamm-Bamm and Pebbles meet the famous researcher in a remote swamp, Jeanine Rubble. Pebbles has long admired her and is happy to finally get to personally know her. But then she realizes that the researcher isn't as great as she always thought.
24	11	"Woman from the Future"	Todd Dejong	Lacey Dyer; Julia Layton	February 17, 2022
Pebbles is upset about Bamm-Bamm because he destroys all of her inventions with his club. Shortly thereafter, she meets herself from the future. What she has to say lets Bamm-Bamm's destructive fury stand in a different light. But this has moved into the Crags that is in grave danger. It is now up to Pebbles and her future self to save Bamm-Bamm.
25	12	"Caveman Begins"	Todd Dejong; Mark Marek	Steve Clemmons	February 17, 2022
Bamm-Bamm meets Captain Caveman, who lives in the Crags, and joins him. However, he quickly realizes that life in the wilderness is different than he had imagined and brings with it a lot of renunciation.
26	13	"The Point of a Friend"	Eric Knutson, Talya Perper; Zach Smith	Steve Clemmons	February 17, 2022
While playing in the Crags, Pebbles and Bamm-Bamm meet Spike, a dinosaur who is extremely lonely and wants a best friend to hug. The problem is that he has spikes all over his body. Pebbles and Bamm-Bamm still try to help him.

== International broadcast ==
Yabba Dabba Dinosaurs first premiered on February 3, 2020, on Boomerang UK. Yabba Dabba Dinosaurs premiered on Boomerang CEE on February 29, 2020. The series started airing on Teletoon in Canada on September 5, 2020.
