= The Flintstones & WWE: Stone Age SmackDown! =

- Blu-ray cover featuring Fred Flintstone and John Cenastone on the foreground.
- Directed by: Spike Brandt; Tony Cervone
- Written by: Jed Elinoff; Scott Thomas
- Based on: The Flintstones by William Hanna and Joseph Barbera
- Produced by: Spike Brandt; Tony Cervone
- Starring: Jeff Bergman; Kevin Michael Richardson; Tress MacNeille; Grey Griffin; Brie Bella; Nikki Bella; Daniel Bryan; John Cena; Mark Henry; Rey Mysterio; CM Punk; The Undertaker; Mr. McMahon
- Edited by: Bruce King; Kyle Stafford
- Music by: Austin Wintory
- Production companies: Warner Bros. Animation; WWE Studios
- Distributed by: Warner Home Video
- Release date: March 10, 2015
- Running time: 51 minutes
- Country: United States
- Language: English

The Flintstones & WWE: Stone Age SmackDown! is a 2015 American direct-to-video animated film starring The Flintstones. It is the second co-production between Warner Bros. Animation and WWE Studios following Scooby-Doo! WrestleMania Mystery. The film features Fred Flintstone, Barney Rubble and the whole Bedrock gang with stone age versions of WWE Superstars and Divas. It was released on March 10, 2015, by Warner Home Video.

It is the first new Flintstones production in over 13 years since The Rubbles, and the first one without original co-creator Joseph Barbera, who died in 2006. The film marked the first time the character of Mr. Slate was voiced by someone other than John Stephenson, who later died of Alzheimer's disease on May 15, 2015. This was also Russi Taylor's last film before her death on July 26, 2019. The film was directed by Spike Brandt and Tony Cervone.

== Plot ==
Fred Flintstone has promised his wife Wilma they will take a vacation. He wants to request days off work and money from his boss Mr. Slate who just then is hiring an indirect relative named John Cenastone. After getting into trouble, Fred is saved by Cenastone. Fred doesn't receive money from Mr. Slate and Fred doesn't know how to tell Wilma the bad news. At a fair organized by the Lodge of the Water Buffaloes, Fred devises a way to earn money: he enlists Hoppy, the "hoparoo" pet of his friend Barney Rubble, to challenge people to boxing matches. When they arrive, among other attractions are the Boulder Twins who open a kissing booth causing jealousy in Fred and Barney's wives Wilma and Betty.

Hoppy defeats many people, but his winning streak ends when the ruffian CM Punkrock humiliates him. Angered, Barney challenges Punkrock and defeats him. Punkrock exits angrily with his teammate Marble Henry. Fred envisions a great opportunity to earn even more money with wrestling after the success of Barney's performance. They are greeted by a seafood seller named Mr. McMagma and they decide to organize an event at an abandoned circus.

Fred asks Cenastone to recruit more wrestlers. He brings Rey Mysteriopal, a masked clerk; and The Undertaker, a somber gravedigger. The event begins between Cenastone and Mysteriopal; as they are on friendly terms, the fight fails. Fred decides that Barney should wrestle against Undertaker. Barney protests, but Fred presses him. Just when Barney is about to win the match, Wilma and Betty arrive and scold their husbands. Everything is resolved, especially because Fred has earned enough money.

Fred aspires to more, however, as he has been inspired by McMagma, and decides to organize a second event. Fred rents the Bedrock Stadium. He promotes a rematch between Barney and Punkrock. Punkrock accepts and Fred also enlists Henry and the Boulder Twins. Barney, however, does not agree to participate. Fred leaves without him, starting his show. Mysteriopal and Cenastone fight again, but people are cheering for Barney. Fred announces that Barney will not fight. The other fighters exit, disappointed that Fred has neglected his friend and leaving Fred to face the opponents alone.

Fred takes courage and faces Punkrock and his allies in the wrestling ring, but he is brutalized. Seeing his friend's sacrifice, Barney decides to go and face Punkrock, encouraging other wrestlers to participate. Even Wilma and Betty intimidate the Boulders and Barney and Betty's son Bamm-Bamm easily defeats Henry. Fred and Barney and their team win to great applause.

Fred decides to quit wrestling. He takes his profits and sells the idea to McMagma. At the end, the Flintstones, the Rubbles, and the wrestlers enjoy their vacations.

== Cast ==
- Jeff Bergman as Fred Flintstone
- Kevin Michael Richardson as Barney Rubble
- Tress MacNeille as Wilma Flintstone
- Grey Griffin as Betty Rubble
- Russi Taylor as Pebbles Flintstone
- Eric Bauza as Dino, Hoppy, Bamm-Bamm Rubble
- John O'Hurley as Mr. Slate
- Brie Bella as Brie Boulder
- Nikki Bella as Nikki Boulder
- Daniel Bryan as Daniel Bryrock
- John Cena as John Cenastone
- Mark Henry as Marble Henry
- Vince McMahon as Mr. McMagma
- Rey Mysterio as Rey Mysteriopal
- CM Punk as CM Punkrock
- The Undertaker as himself

Additional Voices by Doug Erholtz, Charlie Hewson, and Tom Kenny.

== Development ==
According to Daniel Bryan, the wrestlers recorded their lines during SummerSlam in 2013. Collette Sunderman was the casting and voice director. Also, this was the last WWE-related project CM Punk did until returning to be a contributor for WWE Backstage, and it was actually released over a year after his unfavorable departure from the company, but by the time he left, production and development of the movie was too far along to edit him out in any way without causing significant delays.

== Reception ==
A review from Indiewire calls the film "a brand-new release that so meticulously recaptures the salad days of Hanna-Barbera (that it) only makes one yearn for more Flintstones cartoons".

== Home media ==
The film was initially released on DVD and Blu-ray on March 10, 2015. On August 4, 2020, it was included in the DVD collection The Flintstones: 2 Movies & 5 Specials.
