= Yearn2Learn =

Educational video game series

Yearn2Learn is a series of educational games for Windows and Macintosh by American studio Image Smith, based on the Peanuts series of comic books. and The Flintstones franchise.

== List of games ==
Peanuts

- Yearn2Learn: Snoopy (1993)
- Yearn2Learn: Peanuts (1994)
- Yearn2Learn: Master Snoopy's Math (1994)
- Yearn2Learn: Master Snoopy's Spelling (1994)
- Yearn2Learn: Master Snoopy's Coloring Book (1995)
- Yearn2Learn: Master Snoopy's World Geography (1995)

The Flintstones

- Yearn2Learn: The Flintstones Tell-A-Tale Library (1994)
- Yearn2Learn: The Flintstones Bedrock Art Gallery (1995)
- Yearn2Learn: The Flintstones Spellasoarus Quarry (1995)

== Reception ==
Computer Gaming World reviewed Peanuts and wrote: "Overall, the concepts in Yearn 2 Learn are solid."
