= The Rubbles =

- Los Mármol
- Based on: The Flintstones by William Hanna and Joseph Barbera
- Written by: Manoela Muraro
- Creative director: Fernando Semenzato
- Opening theme: "Life of the Rubbles"
- Country of origin: Argentina
- Original language: English
- No. of seasons: 1
- No. of episodes: 6 (list of episodes)

Production
- Running time: 1–2 minutes
- Production company: Hook Up Animation

Original release
- Network: Cartoon Network
- Release: August 12, 2002

Related
- Dino: The Great Egg-Scape; Yabba Dabba Dinosaurs; The Flintstones

Los Mármol (The Rubbles in English, Os Rubbles in Portuguese) is a series of 6 animated shorts spun-off from The Flintstones that aired during commercial breaks on the Latin American Cartoon Network in 2002. It is a parody of The Osbournes, a reality show that aired on MTV. The titles have been changed to Spanish and Portuguese but all the episodes are in English. The Rubbles was the last Flintstones production until the 2015 direct-to-video film The Flintstones & WWE: Stone Age SmackDown! and the first Flintstones project without original creator William Hanna who died in 2001.

== Overview ==
The series parodies the format of reality shows including the constant moving of the camera and swearing. It is focused on the Rubble family and their everyday life.

== Characters ==
=== Main ===
- Barney Rubble, the main character who mostly seems annoyed and constantly uses swear words.
- Betty Rubble, Barney's wife, she is always there to help her husband, however seen in many occasions fighting with him.
- Bamm-Bamm Rubble, Barney and Betty's teenage son, he is an unemployed slacker and his father wants him to look for a job and move out. He has a crush on Pebbles Flintstone which is not well-received by his mother, who sees the Flintstones as family.
- Hoppy, the Rubbles' pet hopparoo, he is shown to be playful and mischievous.

=== Recurring ===
- Fred Flintstone, Barney's best friend and next-door neighbor, they are seen bowling together and having a BBQ with their families.
- Wilma Flintstone, Fred's wife and Betty's best friend, when Betty's not with Barney, she is mostly with Wilma.
- Pebbles Flintstone, Fred and Wilma's teenage daughter, she doesn't seem to share the feelings of Bamm-Bamm.

== Episodes ==
| Episode | Title | Plot | Characters (in order of appearance) |
|---|---|---|---|
| Nr. 1 | The Remote | Barney is angry because the remote is out of battery; Betty is concerned about her weight and Barney has a problem. | Barney, Hoppy, Betty, Wilma, Bamm-Bamm |
| Nr. 2 | The Accident | Barney has an accident with Bamm-Bamm's weights; meanwhile, Betty has the pie for the charity fair safely stored, that is until Barney gets his hands on it. | Barney, Betty, Bamm-Bamm (mentioned), Wilma, Fred |
| Nr. 3 | The Fence | Barney and Bamm-Bamm are about to fix the fence when they get invited inside for lunch; Betty accuses Bamm-Bamm of creating havoc around the house. | Barney, Bamm-Bamm, Betty, Hoppy |
| Nr. 4 | Bathing Time | Barney chases Hoppy all over the house to get him to take his bath; meanwhile, Bamm-Bamm has a fever. | Barney, Hoppy, Betty, Wilma, Bamm-Bamm |
| Nr. 5 | Trouble with Sleeping | Barney is having trouble sleeping; The Rubbles and the Flintstones are having a BBQ. | Barney, Betty, Bamm-Bamm, Fred, Pebbles, Wilma, Hoppy |
| Nr. 6 | Finale | In the series finale, Barney tells the viewers about his life as a celebrity. | Barney, Betty, Betty's mother (mentioned), Bamm-Bamm, Wilma, several background characters, Hoppy |

== Theme song ==
The music of the theme song is based on "Rise and Shine", the original opening and closing theme during the first two seasons of The Flintstones, albeit with new song lyrics added.

== Production ==
The series was produced by Cartoon Network, with creative direction by Fernando Semenzato, screenplays by Manoela Muraro, producer in the channel's creative department, and directed in two countries, Brazil and Argentina. The acclaimed Brazilian production company Lobo Filmes animated the opening and closing sequences of the vignettes, and Hook Up Animation was responsible for animation of the episodes.
