= Dino (The Flintstones) =

Dinosaur character in The Flintstones

- The Flintstones character
- First appearance: "No Help Wanted"; The Flintstones; October 21, 1960
- Created by: William Hanna Joseph Barbera
- Voiced by: Mel Blanc (1960–1989, 1994, 2000); Jerry Mann (1961); Frank Welker (1981–2001); Hal Smith (1984); Keith Scott (1992, 1996; Green's commercial, Wonderland Sydney commercials); Jeff Bergman (1994; Flintstones/Jetsons: Timewarp); Frank Ward (1996; A Flintstones Motown Christmas); Mark Mangini (2000–2001); Seth Green (2011; Robot Chicken); J. Todd (2014); Eric Bauza (2015–2022)

In-universe information
- Species: Snorkasaurus
- Gender: Male
- Spouse: Juliet
- Children: 15

Dino ( /ˈdiːnoʊ/), also known as Farkle, is a fictional character featured in the Hanna-Barbera animated television series The Flintstones, and its spin-offs and feature films. He is a pet dinosaur of the series' main characters, Fred and Wilma Flintstone. Dino debuted in the opening credits of the pilot episode of The Flintstones, but is not mentioned by name until the first season's fourth episode, "No Help Wanted". Dino was voiced by voiceover actor Mel Blanc from 1960 to 1989 and (through archival recordings) in 1994 and 2000.

== Background ==
In the series, Dino serves the role of a pet dog, and exhibits the characteristics of a typical domesticated canine.

Dino is a prosauropod-like dinosaur, a Snorkasaurus. Dino is a relatively small dinosaur, only slightly larger than the humans of his time, smaller than mammoths that appear in the series, and much smaller than the numerous sauropods that appear as work animals in the series (a full-sized sauropod appears as a crane in the opening sequence, and oversized "bronto ribs" the size of an automobile are seen in the closing credits).

A recurring gag in the series is Fred coming home from work, and Dino gets excited and knocks him down and licks his face. But no matter how hard he tries to the contrary, Fred usually gives in to Dino's ticklish and wet doglike kisses. Dino frequently exhibits human emotions, nearly "talking", and can also be moved to anger, at which point he snarls and snaps, especially when Fred tries to lie either to or in front of him, which he can always tell. He also loves to play with Pebbles and Bamm-Bamm, the Flintstones' and Rubbles' respective offspring; these characters are introduced in the middle part of the series. In the episode "Hop Happy" Dino meets Hoppy, the Rubbles' new pet hopperoo. At first, Dino and Fred get scared, thinking he's a giant mouse, but they eventually become best friends after Hoppy helps Dino rescue their owners in an accident.

Although he is usually immune, Dino does take a couple of brief stabs at romance. The first comes in the episode, "Dino Goes Hollyrock", which originally aired on September 14, 1962. In it, Dino falls in love with female TV star sauropod "Sassie" (an obvious takeoff on Lassie) and then becomes her co-star on her TV show. However, after she removes her false eyelashes and wig, he is shocked that she turned out to be an ugly, talented sauropod that could be beautified. The second comes in the episode, "Dino and Juliet", which originally aired on November 26, 1964. In it, Dino falls in love with the new neighbor's female sauropod (Juliet). Their romance, which results in the birth of 15 puppies, helps end the feud between Fred and the new neighbor, Mr. Loudrock.

Although Dino had already appeared earlier in the series' first season (such as the episode "No Help Wanted" and "Arthur Quarry's Dance Class" - these episodes were made after the "Snorkasaurus Hunter" but aired before), Dino is portrayed quite differently in the first season's 18th episode "The Snorkasaurus Hunter". In this episode, Fred and his friend Barney Rubble are on a camping trip, trying to hunt a snorkasaurus. Unlike Dino's other appearances, the snorkasaurus in this episode speaks and behaves toward Fred and Barney in a manner similar to comedian Phil Silvers. At the end of the episode, the Flintstones take in the dinosaur; the snorkasaurus (called "Dino" at one point by Wilma) is seen acting like a butler for the Flintstones: answering the telephone, dusting, and ironing. Dino in this episode is also slightly larger than in other appearances, walks on his hind legs, and has purple skin instead of his varying pink-to-red color, which seems to vary from episode-to-episode during this early period, but is consistently portrayed as purple after this episode. After this episode, Dino is also portrayed as behaving in a doglike fashion.

Dino's origins are explained in the episode "Dino Disappears", which originally aired on October 10, 1963. In it, Wilma states that Dino followed Fred home because Fred was playing with him. Fred counters by saying he was merely trying to chase him away. This seems to refer to the episode "Snorkasaurus Hunter" where Fred and Barney's playing was actually hunting him down and Dino's following him was actually Dino sneaking onto the car.

Post-original series, Dino appears in most of the series' spin-offs, except during the first season of The Pebbles and Bamm-Bamm Show. There, Dino is replaced by Wooly, a dwarf mammoth, as the Flintstone family's pet. However, starting with the following series The Flintstone Comedy Hour, Dino once again becomes a regular character.

In the 1980–1982 series The Flintstone Comedy Show, Dino is featured in his own segment, "Dino and Cavemouse", where Dino tries futilely to capture a pesky mouse in the Flintstone household. The segments bear some similarities to classic cat-and-mouse cartoons such as Tom and Jerry.

Dino later appears as a puppy in 1986–1988 series The Flintstone Kids (including his own segment, "Dino's Dilemmas"), as Pebbles and Bamm-Bamm's babysitter in the short-lived 1996 series Cave Kids, and also starred in his own two 7-minute short cartoons, Dino: Stay Out! (1995) and Dino: The Great Egg-Scape (1997).

In 2021, Dino is featured in the new series Yabba Dabba Dinosaurs. Similar to Cave Kids, the show focuses on the lives of Pebbles and Bamm-Bamm, who are joined by Dino for many adventures in the Stone Age.

== Other media ==
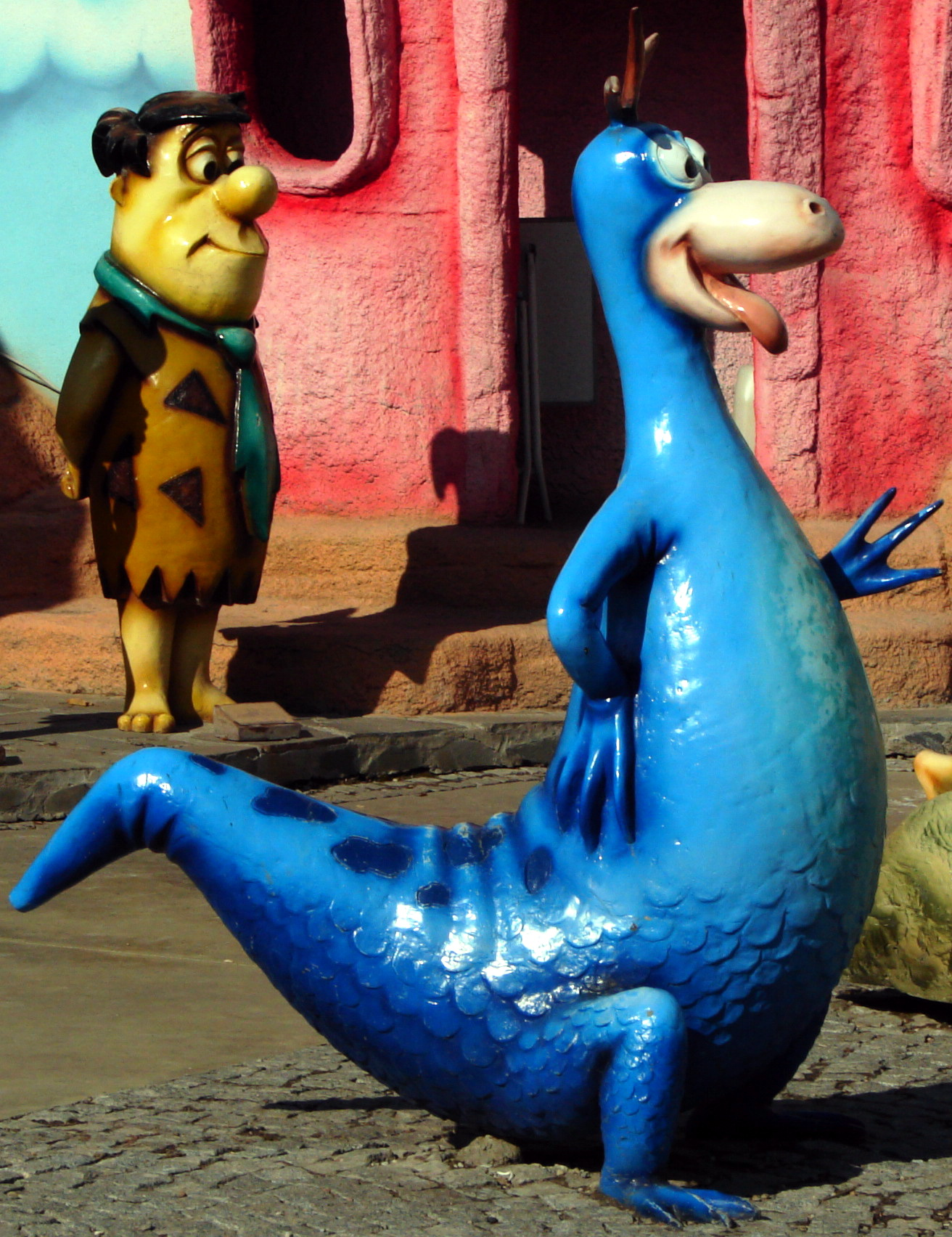
Dino statue (right), along with Fred Flintstone (left).

Dino appears in both live-action movies. He is not seen very often in the first film, The Flintstones (1994). Dino was created with both computer-generated imagery and as a puppet from Jim Henson's Creature Shop, while archival audio of Mel Blanc from the original series was used to serve as Dino's voice.

However, in the second film, The Flintstones in Viva Rock Vegas (2000), Dino has more screen time; he appears here as a puppy. Fred won Dino's egg as a prize after winning a carnival game. Initially, Fred didn't think much of the egg as he felt that the creatures inside never live long. On a ferris wheel, just as Fred and Wilma are about to kiss, Dino's egg hatches and he takes an immediate attachment to Fred, believing him to be his mother.

Dino made non-speaking cameos on Harvey Birdman, Attorney at Law in the episodes "The Dabba Don" and "Peanut Puberty".

== Filmography ==
=== Television shows ===
- The Flintstones (1960–1966)
- The Flintstone Comedy Hour (1972–1974)
- Fred Flintstone and Friends (1977–1978)
- The New Fred and Barney Show (1979)
- Fred and Barney Meet the Thing (1979)
- Fred and Barney Meet the Shmoo (1979–1980)
- The Flintstone Comedy Show (1980–1982)
- The Flintstone Funnies (1982–1984)
- The Flintstone Kids (1986–1988)
- What a Cartoon! – featuring Dino: Stay Out! (1995) and Dino: The Great Egg-Scape (1997)
- Cave Kids (1996)
- Yabba Dabba Dinosaurs (2021–2022)

=== Films and specials ===
- The Man Called Flintstone (1966)
- Energy: A National Issue (1977)
- A Flintstone Christmas (1977)
- The Flintstones: Little Big League (1978)
- The Flintstones: Fred's Final Fling (1980)
- The Flintstones: Wind-Up Wilma (1981)
- The Flintstones: Jogging Fever (1981)
- The Jetsons Meet the Flintstones (1987)
- The Flintstone Kids' "Just Say No" Special (1988)
- A Yabba Dabba Doo Celebration: 50 Years of Hanna-Barbera (1989)
- I Yabba-Dabba Do! (1993)
- Hollyrock-a-Bye Baby (1993)
- A Flintstone Family Christmas (1993)
- The Flintstones (1994)
- A Flintstones Christmas Carol (1994)
- The Flintstones in Viva Rock Vegas (2000)
- The Flintstones: On the Rocks (2001)
- The Flintstones & WWE: Stone Age SmackDown! (2015)

== Portrayal ==
Dino's barks and sound effects were provided by Mel Blanc for 29 years, from 1960 to 1989; archive audio of Blanc was used for Dino in the 1994 live-action film and its prequel in 2000. Jerry Mann provided the speaking voice of Dino in the 1961 episode "The Snorkasaurus Hunter". Frank Welker provided Dino's vocal effects for 20 years, from The Flintstones: Jogging Fever in 1981, until The Flintstones: On the Rocks in 2001. Mark Mangini provided additional vocals effects for The Flintstones in Viva Rock Vegas and shared vocal duties with Welker for The Flintstones: On the Rocks. Eric Bauza provided the vocal effects for the 2015 direct-to-video The Flintstones & WWE: Stone Age SmackDown! and the 2020 spin-off Yabba-Dabba Dinosaurs.
