= Dino: The Great Egg-Scape =

- Genre: Animation
- Based on: The Flintstones
- Written by: Joseph Barbera
- Directed by: Joseph Barbera
- Voices of: Frank Welker; Russi Taylor; Nick Jameson; Rob Paulsen; Gary Owens
- Music by: Gary Lionelli
- Country of origin: United States
- Original language: English

Production
- Executive producer: Buzz Potamkin
- Editor: Paul Douglas
- Running time: 7 minutes
- Production company: Hanna-Barbera Cartoons

Original release
- Network: Cartoon Network
- Release: March 5, 1997

Related
- Cave Kids; The Rubbles; The Flintstones

Dino: The Great Egg-Scape is a 1997 American animated short film and a spin-off of The Flintstones starring Dino, the Flintstone family's pet dinosaur. Directed by Joseph Barbera and produced by Hanna-Barbera Cartoons, it originally aired as part of What a Cartoon! on Cartoon Network on March 5, 1997.

== Plot ==
Dino is working as a night watchman at the Bedrock Museum. When a last-of-its-kind golden and green-spotted brontosaurus egg is stolen while he's sleeping on duty, the museum curator orders Dino to find the egg or else he loses his job. While police cars are pursuing the thief, the egg falls out of the thief's vehicle and rolls into the Flintstones house just as Dino is returning home. Dino is happy to see the returned egg and the baby brontosaurus breaks out of his shell. The baby starts crying because he is hungry, so Dino begins feeding him plenty of milk and food, causing the brontosaurus to suddenly grow into a gigantic creature. Dino also panics when he sees a special news bulletin on TV in which a sketch artist mistakenly identifies Dino as the thief who stole the egg.

The huge baby brontosaurus escapes the Flintstones house and begins devouring anything in his path with Dino in hot pursuit. Eventually, the baby is happily reunited with his mother brontosaurus and as they walk away together, the baby waves goodbye to a tearful Dino. The museum curator is happy and amusingly says to Dino: "Sometimes to make an omelette, you have to break an egg!"

== Voice cast ==
- Frank Welker as Dino, Older Baby Brontosaurus, Siren
- Russi Taylor as Baby Brontosaurus
- Nick Jameson as Museum Curator, Guard Bird, Dinosaur
- Rob Paulsen as Cop
- Gary Owens as Announcer, Commander

== Production ==
Fred Seibert became president of Hanna-Barbera Cartoons in 1992 and helped guide the struggling animation studio into its greatest output in years with shows like 2 Stupid Dogs and SWAT Kats: The Radical Squadron. Seibert wanted the studio to produce short cartoons, in the vein of the Golden age of American animation. Although a project consisting of 48 shorts would cost twice as much as a normal series, Seibert's pitch to Cartoon Network involved promising 48 chances to "succeed or fail," opened up possibilities for new original programming, and offered several new shorts to the thousands already present in Warner Bros. via the Turner Entertainment Co. library. According to Seibert, quality did not matter much to the cable operators distributing the struggling network, they were more interested in promising new programs.

Seibert's idea for the project was influenced heavily by Looney Tunes. William Hanna, with partner Joseph Barbera, as well as veteran animator Friz Freleng, taught Seibert how the shorts of the Golden age of American animation were produced. As was the custom in live action film and television, the company did not pay each creator for the storyboard submitted and pitched. For the first time in the studio's history, individual creators could retain their rights, and earn royalties on their creations.

== See also ==
- Dino: Stay Out!
- What a Cartoon!
