= Cave Kids =

American animated children's television series

- Genre: Adventure; Comedy; Preschool; Fantasy
- Based on: The Flintstones by William Hanna and Joseph Barbera
- Directed by: Marija Miletic Daïl (art)
- Voices of: Aria Noelle Curzon; Christine Cavanaugh; E.G. Daily; Frank Welker
- Theme music composer: Bill Burnett
- Opening theme: "Cave Kids"
- Ending theme: "Cave Kids" (instrumental)
- Composer: Guy Moon
- Country of origin: United States
- Original language: English
- No. of seasons: 1
- No. of episodes: 8

Production
- Executive producer: Sherry Gunther
- Producer: Marija Miletic Daïl
- Running time: 22 minutes
- Production company: Hanna-Barbera Cartoons

Original release
- Network: Syndication
- Release: September 29 – November 17, 1996

Related
- Dino: Stay Out!; Dino: The Great Egg-Scape; The Flintstones

Cave Kids (also known as Cave Kids Adventures or Cave Kids: Pebbles & Bamm-Bamm) is an American animated preschool television series produced by Hanna-Barbera Cartoons and a spin-off of The Flintstones. The show was syndicated to public television stations by Warner Bros. Television from September 29 to November 17, 1996, with reruns available until 1999. It is also Hanna-Barbera's final television series produced before being acquired by Time Warner. The show also aired reruns on Boomerang and MeTV Toons.

== Premise ==
The series follows the adventures of Pebbles Flintstone and Bamm-Bamm Rubble as prehistoric pre-schoolers with Dino, the Flintstone family's pet dinosaur, as their babysitter. While Pebbles and Bamm-Bamm speak in baby-talk gibberish to adults, they could communicate normally with each other, a la Rugrats (another show that Bamm-Bamm's voice actresses, Cavanaugh and Daily worked on).

Unlike the original 1960s Flintstones series and its spin-off incarnations featuring the kids and their parents in slapstick comedy adventures, this show focused more on educational values and lessons for children, with each episode also concluding with a music video relating to the episode's theme, using often-altered footage from the episode. Another thing worth noting is that Pebbles, Bamm-Bamm and Dino were the only established characters to appear in the show. Every other character from the television series was completely absent.

An earlier Cave Kids effort was published by Golden Press, both as a Little Golden Books in 1963, and also as a Gold Key Comics series spanning 16 issues from 1963 through 1967.

== Voice cast ==
- Aria Noelle Curzon as Pebbles Flintstone
- Christine Cavanaugh as Bamm-Bamm Rubble (singing voice provided by E. G. Daily)
- Frank Welker as Dino / Icemonster (Snowbear)
- Maurice LaMarche as Snowman
- Rob Paulsen as Curly / Rabbit

== Episodes ==
No.	Title	Original release date
1	"Beanstalk Blues"	September 29, 1996
Pebbles and Bamm-Bamm are watering plants in a garden when their imagination kicks in and they grow a giant beanstalk.
2	"China Challenge"	October 6, 1996
When Pebbles' plate is broken during a dispute with Bamm-Bamm, they head to China in hopes of getting their plate fixed.
3	"Soap Bubble Dreams"	October 13, 1996
Pebbles and Bamm-Bamm go down the drain to recover Dino's collar when it accidentally gets washed down the bathtub while they're giving Dino a bath.
4	"Sand Castle Surprise"	October 20, 1996
Pebbles and Bamm-Bamm are at the beach when they go into a world ruled by a King Crab, who happens to have extreme shyness.
5	"Kiss and Spell"	October 27, 1996
A search for Pebbles' lost doll, Gretel, takes Pebbles and Bamm-Bamm to fairytale land where they encounter talking trees, a talking frog, Little Red Riding Hood and Robin Hood.
6	"Of Mice and Moon"	November 3, 1996
Pebbles and Bamm-Bamm visit the Moon and meet with both a Moon mouse and the lady on the Moon.
7	"Color Me Cave Kid"	November 10, 1996
Pebbles and Bamm-Bamm get transported to a world which is ruled by the nasty Katty with his dog Wompus, whose enemy is a colorful French blob named Miss Palette.
8	"Cave Kid Christmas"	November 17, 1996
Pebbles and Bamm-Bamm visit the North Pole and learn that there's more to Christmas than presents; they find a baby Christmas tree and cheer up a grumpy Snowbear.

== Merchandising ==
=== Album ===
A sing-along album, Cave Kids Sing-Along, was released on cassette tape and CD by Kid Rhino on February 4, 1997. The album featured seven songs performed by Pebbles and Bamm-Bamm, including five from the series. The package also contained a full-color booklet with lyrics to all the songs.

Track listing

1. "Cave Kids Theme"
2. "The Cave Kid Crawl"
3. "The Woman in the Moon"
4. "Little Is Just Right for Me"
5. "Sharing"
6. "Hand in Hand"
7. "Being a Friend"

=== Home media ===
On June 10, 1997, Warner Home Video released three separate Cave Kids titles on videocassette: "Watch Us Grow", "At Play" and "Make New Friends", with each 44-minute cassette featuring two episodes and a music video.

Title	Release date	Episodes
"Watch Us Grow"	June 10, 1997	Kiss and Spell; Beanstalk Blues
"At Play"	June 10, 1997	Sand Castle Surprise; Soap Bubble Dreams
"Make New Friends"	June 10, 1997	China Challenge; Of Mice and Moon

== See also ==
- List of works produced by Hanna-Barbera Productions
