= Dino: Stay Out! =

- Genre: Animation
- Based on: The Flintstones
- Written by: Stewart St. John
- Directed by: Joseph Barbera
- Voices of: Henry Corden; Frank Welker; Jean Vander Pyl
- Music by: Gary Lionelli
- Country of origin: United States
- Original language: English

Production
- Executive producer: Buzz Potamkin
- Editor: Tom Gleason
- Running time: 7 minutes
- Production company: Hanna-Barbera Cartoons, Inc.

Original release
- Network: Cartoon Network
- Release: March 19, 1995

Related
- The Flintstone Kids; Cave Kids; The Flintstones

Dino: Stay Out! is a 1995 American animated short film and a spin-off of The Flintstones starring Dino, the Flintstone family's pet dinosaur. Directed by Joseph Barbera and produced by Hanna-Barbera Cartoons, it originally aired as part of What a Cartoon! on Cartoon Network on March 19, 1995.

== Plot ==
When Fred Flintstone goes bowling, he leaves Dino in charge of keeping their Saber Tooth Cat outside the house. Although Dino tries his best, the Saber Tooth Cat keeps coming back inside and outwit Dino at every turn; disguising himself as Santa Claus, a baby, and a tiger skinned rug. When Fred comes back inside the house, he scolds Dino because of his poor ideas of keeping the cat out of the house. When Dino tells him what the cat has done through gestures, Fred does not buy Dino's excuse. He drags Dino to the shed, telling him, "If you have had put the cat in the shed, HE WOULD STILL BE IN THE SHED! BUT THERE IS NO CAT IN THIS SHED!"

Fred opens the door of the shed, only to find out that there are many more cats inside. They yell at Fred to shut the door. After complying and acting apologetic, Fred loses his temper, opens the door, and yells at all of them to leave. The Saber Tooth Cat notes "What can I say? I got a big family." Fred then shows Dino the steps for keeping the Saber Tooth Cat out of the house one more time. Afterward, the Saber Tooth Cat manages to lock Fred and Dino out. The cat then taunts Fred at the window, locks the window and goes to sleep in Dino's bed. Meanwhile, Fred screaming at the door; ordering the cat to let him in, with Dino eventually joining him.

== Voice cast ==
- Henry Corden as Fred Flintstone
- Frank Welker as Dino, Saber Tooth Cat
- Jean Vander Pyl as Wilma Flintstone (offscreen)

== Production ==
Fred Seibert became president of Hanna-Barbera Cartoons in 1992 and helped guide the struggling animation studio into its greatest output in years with shows like 2 Stupid Dogs and SWAT Kats: The Radical Squadron. Seibert wanted the studio to produce short cartoons, in the vein of the Golden age of American animation. Although a project consisting of 48 shorts would cost twice as much as a normal series, Seibert's pitch to Cartoon Network involved promising 48 chances to "succeed or fail," opened up possibilities for new original programming, and offered several new shorts to the thousands already present in the Turner Entertainment Co. library. According to Seibert, quality did not matter much to the cable operators distributing the struggling network, they were more interested in promising new programs.

Seibert's idea for the project was influenced heavily by Looney Tunes. William Hanna, with partner Joseph Barbera, as well as veteran animator Friz Freleng, taught Seibert how the shorts of the Golden age of American animation were produced. As was the custom in live action film and television, the company did not pay each creator for the storyboard submitted and pitched. For the first time in the studio's history, individual creators could retain their rights, and earn royalties on their creations.

== See also ==
- Dino: The Great Egg-Scape
- What a Cartoon!
