= Christmas Flintstone =

- The Flintstones episode
- VHS cover
- Episode no.: Season 5 Episode 15
- Directed by: Joseph Barbera; William Hanna
- Written by: Warren Foster
- Production code: P-131
- Original air date: December 25, 1964

Episode chronology
← Previous "Adobe Dick"	Next → "Fred's Flying Lesson"

"Christmas Flintstone" (also known as "How The Flintstones Saved Christmas" on VHS releases) is a Christmas episode from season 5 of the animated television series The Flintstones, which aired on ABC on December 25, 1964. The episode is about Fred Flintstone taking over the role of Santa Claus.

The episode is followed by three Christmas-themed Flintstones specials: A Flintstone Christmas (1977), A Flintstone Family Christmas (1993) and A Flintstones Christmas Carol (1994). It has been released on DVD.

== Plot ==
Fred gets a part-time job at Macyrock's department store in order to help finance the family's Christmas. Mr. Macyrock (voiced by Mel Blanc in his Mr. Spacley voice) initially gets Fred fired for falling into an out-of-order elevator shaft, but when Mr. Macyrock's assistant tells him that their usual Santa Claus is sick, he instead rehires Fred to be Santa. During his stint as Macyrock's store Santa, Fred entertains the children and customers by singing "Christmas is My Fav'rite Time of Year" and "Dino the Dinosaur". Mr. Macyrock tells Fred that he is the best Santa that Macyrock's ever had. Fred even returns home as Santa to show Wilma, Barney and Betty.

On Christmas Eve, Fred's run as Santa at Macyrock's ends, however when Fred falls asleep, two elves named Twinky and Blinky appear, they wake Fred up and ask him to go to the North Pole with them because the real Santa Claus needs to see him, when they arrive at the North Pole, Fred walks into the workshop and finds Santa in bed, he tells him that he's got a cold and the doctor told him not to do his annual trip to deliver the presents, Santa then says that because Fred did a great job at Macyrock's as Santa and replaced their usual Santa due to illness, he wants Fred to sub for him this Christmas and Twinky and Blinky will help him and Fred accepts the offer. Throughout his journey to countries worldwide on Santa's sleigh, Fred shouts Christmas greetings in French, Italian, German, Dutch, English and Swedish and also sings a reprise of "Christmas is My Fav'rite Time of Year".

After the elves drop Fred off at his house, Fred realizes that he left his presents for Wilma and Pebbles in the sleigh, but it was too late to get them back, when he walks in the house, he sees Wilma, Pebbles and the Rubbles with presents, they believe Fred came as Santa and delivered the gifts and was pretending to be sick. Fred runs back outside and sees that the cold-ridden Santa got out of bed to deliver the gifts. Fred and the others open their gifts, and they break the fourth wall by telling the audience "Merry Christmas!"

== Voice cast ==
- Alan Reed as Fred Flintstone
- Jean Vander Pyl as Wilma Flintstone, Pebbles Flintstone, Customer
- Mel Blanc as Barney Rubble, Dino, Mr. Macyrock
- Gerry Johnson as Betty Rubble, Gift-wrapping Lady, Girl #1
- Don Messick as Bamm-Bamm Rubble, Kid #1, Reporter, Blinky
- Hal Smith as Santa Claus, Streetcrosser, Dinosaur
- Dick Beals as Kid #2, Twinky

== Songs ==
- "Christmas is My Fav'rite Time of Year"
- "Dino the Dinosaur"
- "Christmas is My Fav'rite Time of Year" (reprise)

== Production ==
First broadcast in 1964, the episode was produced and directed by Joseph Barbera and William Hanna, under Hanna-Barbera.

== Legacy ==
Turner Home Entertainment released the episode on VHS as "How The Flintstones Saved Christmas". Warner Home Video released the episode on DVD in Region 1 on October 2, 2007, along with the 1994 special A Flintstones Christmas Carol.

"Christmas Flintstone" marked the first of four Christmas-themed The Flintstones animated works. It is followed by A Flintstone Christmas (1977), A Flintstone Family Christmas (1993) and A Flintstones Christmas Carol (1994).

"Christmas Flintstone" is spoofed in the Robot Chicken episode "May Cause Indecision...Or Not", where the Great Gazoo appears to Fred and tells him that his society's celebration of a holiday has created a disruption in the time-space continuum.
