= A Flintstone Christmas =

1977 animated Christmas special

- VHS cover
- Genre: Comedy; Family
- Written by: Duanne Poole; Dick Robbins
- Directed by: Charles A. Nichols
- Voices of: Henry Corden; Mel Blanc; Jean Vander Pyl; Gay Hartwig; Hal Smith; Virginia Gregg; Don Messick
- Music by: Hoyt Curtin
- Country of origin: United States
- Original language: English

Production
- Executive producers: William Hanna; Joseph Barbera
- Running time: 48 minutes
- Production company: Hanna-Barbera Productions

Original release
- Network: NBC
- Release: December 7, 1977

A Flintstone Christmas is a 1977 animated Christmas television special featuring characters from The Flintstones franchise. It was produced by Hanna-Barbera and is the second Christmas-themed animated work in the franchise, after the 1964 episode "Christmas Flintstone". Both feature the character Fred Flintstone taking on the role of Santa Claus. The special first aired on NBC on December 7, 1977.

The special has been released on VHS and DVD. It is followed by two more Flintstones Christmas specials, A Flintstone Family Christmas (1993) and A Flintstones Christmas Carol (1994).

== Plot ==
It is Christmastime in Bedrock, and the Flintstones and the Rubbles are all getting ready for when Santa Claus comes to town. On the morning of Christmas Eve, Fred is busy decorating the house, alongside Wilma and Pebbles, when the Rubbles show up. While Barney helps Fred finish the decorations before heading to work, Wilma and Betty, who have been busy with the preparations for the Christmas party at the Bedrock Orphanage, talk about how Wilma has failed to convince Fred to dress up as Santa for the children. Still, she believes that Fred will change his mind, if she keeps insisting.

Fred arrives at work in Slate's Quarry, where Mr. Slate tells him that he has chosen him to be Santa for the children of Bedrock Orphanage during the Christmas party that very same night. Fred immediately accepts the honor, with Mr. Slate telling him to take the rest of the day off, while warning him that he must show up on time, or he will be fired. Leaving work, Fred heads home, while singing "It's My Favorite Time of the Year". Back at home, Fred tells Wilma how he accepted Mr. Slate's offer to be Santa, and quickly changes into the Santa costume. Shortly after, Barney shows and Wilma leaves for the orphanage, while Fred and Barney plan Fred's grand entrance. While planning, the two of them hear a noise coming from the rooftop. Going outside, they see a pair of boots stuck in the snow. Pulling them out, they find out that the owner of the boots is none other than the true Santa, who accidentally slipped and fell off Fred's roof, spraining his ankle. The guys find out that on top of a sprained ankle, Santa has also caught a cold, preventing him from delivering the presents. With Christmas in jeopardy, Barney suggests that Fred should be the one to do it. Loving the idea, Santa uses his magic, giving Fred his suit and turning Barney into a Christmas elf, while also instructing Fred on how to drive the sleigh.

After a couple of mishaps, Fred and Barney start delivering the presents around the world. Having managed to deliver half of the presents, they fly over China, when they are caught in a snowstorm, which forces them to take the sleigh to a higher altitude in order to escape it. They do so, but in the process, they lose the remaining half of the presents. Calling Santa for help and explaining the situation, the old man tells them that there is only one thing to do, and that they must go to his workshop back on the North Pole to get the rest of the presents. When asking how to get there, Santa tells Fred and Barney to tell the reindeer to head back home, because they know the way. Santa even calls up Mrs. Claus to let her know of the situation.

Arriving at the North Pole, Fred and Barney quickly fill the sleigh with a new set of presents with help from Mrs. Claus and the Christmas elves and fly into the sky. They begin dropping the rest of the gifts down the chimneys, when Fred remembers about the Christmas party. Knowing that they will not be able to reach Bedrock in time, they call Santa for help, who tells them to put the sleigh in top speed.

This allows them to deliver the rest of the presents and reach Bedrock in time. Not having a minute to lose, they arrive at the orphanage, sliding down the chimney. Using Santa's magic to produce gifts for the orphans, Fred not only saves the party, but also his job.

== Songs ==
- "Which One is the Real Santa Claus?" (originally featured in A Christmas Story (1972)
- "It's My Favorite Time of the Year" (also featured in Yogi's First Christmas (1980)
- "Sounds of Christmas Day" (originally featured in A Christmas Story (1972) and on the 1972 Kings Island Hanna-Barbera attraction, Enchanted Voyage
- "Brand New Kind of Christmas Song" (released on Hanna-Barbera's Christmas Sing-A-Long album in 1991)
- "Hope" (first featured in "A Christmas Story (1972) and again in Yogi's First Christmas (1980)

== Voice cast ==
- Henry Corden as Fred Flintstone
- Mel Blanc as Barney Rubble, and Dino
- Jean Vander Pyl as Wilma Flintstone, and Pebbles Flintstone
- Gay Hartwig as Betty Rubble
- Lucille Bliss as Bamm-Bamm Rubble
- John Stephenson as Mr. Slate
- Hal Smith as Santa Claus, and The Elevator Operator
- Virginia Gregg as Mrs. Claus
- Don Messick as Ed the Foreman, and Otis

== Production ==
Charles A. Nichols directed the special, based on a teleplay by Duanne Poole and Dick Robbins. It was the first television production to feature Fred voiced by Henry Corden following the death of original voice actor Alan Reed. Corden had previously voiced Fred for records and as his singing voice.

== Broadcast ==
The special originally aired on NBC on December 7, 1977. ABC Family aired the special in its 25 Days of Christmas broadcast in December 2011. Since the late 2010s the special has aired as part of Boomerang's All I Watch for Christmas block every December.

MeTV Toons aired it as part of 'Tis the Season for Toons on November 2, 2024.

== Home media ==
Turner Home Entertainment released the episode on VHS. In September 2011, Warner Archive released A Flintstone Christmas on DVD in Region 1, along with A Flintstone Family Christmas (1993), as A Flintstone Christmas Collection.

== Reception ==
In 2005, authors Kevin Cuddihy and Phillip Metcalfe named the special seventh in their Christmas-themed list of "Not-so-Classic Cartoons," complimenting Corden, who became Fred's regular voice. Cuddihy and Metcalfe also remarked on the anachronism on prehistoric times being before the Nativity of Jesus and thus, Christmas. In his DVD Talk review, Paul Mavis called the special "a rather sweet effort" and the songs "quite cute." William D. Crump, author of The Christmas Encyclopedia, assessed the special as "virtually a remake" of "Christmas Flintstone." Matt Bungard, writing for The Sydney Morning Herald, placed it in the top 10 Christmas specials, calling the plot simple but "staple Christmas viewing."
