= List of The Flintstones episodes =

The Flintstones is an American animated sitcom produced by Hanna-Barbera Productions that aired on ABC from September 30, 1960 to April 1, 1966. As of September 2006, all six seasons have been released on DVD in North America. In all, 166 episodes were produced for the original series.

== Series overview ==
Season	Episodes	Originally released	
Season	Episodes	First released	Last released
Pilot		1959 (test screening); May 7, 1994 (on Cartoon Network)	
1	28	September 30, 1960	April 7, 1961
2	32	September 15, 1961	April 27, 1962
3	28	September 14, 1962	April 5, 1963
4	26	September 19, 1963	March 12, 1964
5	26	September 17, 1964	March 12, 1965
6	26	September 17, 1965	April 1, 1966

== Episodes ==
=== Pilot (1959) ===
Title	Animated by	Original release date
"The Flagstones"	Kenneth Muse	1959 (test screening); May 7, 1994 (on Cartoon Network)
First released on The Flintstones: The Collector's Edition on VHS in 1994, it made its television debut on Cartoon Network on May 7, 1994, and aired again on Boomerang in November 2006. It was released on DVD in 2001 and again in 2004. Notes: This was the original pilot episode for The Flintstones, but was never shown with the original series. It was actually a 90-second "demo reel" (with grease pencil marks still visible on the film), designed to sell the series to potential advertisers in the winter of 1959, depicting a scene from what would eventually become the episode "The Swimming Pool". Daws Butler provided the voices of Fred and Barney (he later reprised the role of Barney in season 2 episodes 1, 2, 5, 6 and 9 when Mel Blanc was unavailable to provide the voice after a car accident at that time), June Foray was Betty (her appearance was somewhat redesigned for the actual series), and Jean Vander Pyl was Wilma (the only actor from the pilot to regularly reprise their role for the actual series). The pilot was re-voiced for the Cartoon Crack-Ups DVD release for unknown reasons with Henry Corden as Fred, Frank Welker as Barney, Tress MacNeille as Wilma, and Betty Jean Ward as Betty. All other releases of the pilot use the original voice track.

=== Season 1 (1960–61) ===
No. overall	No. in season	Title	Written by	Original release date	Prod. code	U.S. households (in millions)
1	1	"The Flintstone Flyer"	Joseph Barbera & Michael Maltese	September 30, 1960	P–2	7.19
On a Sunday, Barney invents a flying machine, which Fred dubs the "Flintstone Flyer". Later, Fred and Barney discover that their families' plans to go to an opera clashes with an upcoming Bowling match, so the former fakes illness to get out of going to the opera. With the use of Barney's flying machine as a means of escape, the two then join their bowling team for the tournament. They are nearly exposed when Wilma and Betty arrive at the bowling alley but manage to fool them by wearing false mustaches. However, Barney forgets to shed their disguise when they get home, which lands them in serious trouble with their wives.
2	2	"Hot Lips Hannigan"	Warren Foster	October 7, 1960	P–9	8.27
Thinking of an act for an upcoming talent show, Fred decides to do a magic act and mistakenly believes that he made Wilma and Betty disappear in a magic trick. Taking advantage of this, he and Barney decide to go to the Dance Hall to see the famous singer, Hot Lips Hannigan perform. To teach their husbands a lesson, Wilma and Betty disguise as teenage girls, who chase after Fred and Barney, with comical results.
3	3	"The Swimming Pool"	Warren Foster	October 14, 1960	P–1	8.18
Following a falling out due to a misunderstanding, Fred and Barney reconcile when they build a joint swimming pool together. However, this peace becomes short-lived when Barney begins inviting other people to use the pool. Fred plots revenge by crashing a pool party that Barney is hosting until he finds out that the party is for him, reconciling the two once again. Unfortunately for Fred, he gets arrested after harassing a police officer, believing him to be a friend in disguise. Notes: A brief snippet of this episode shows up later in a Jetsons episode, "Elroy's Mob"; a classmate of Elroy's watches it on his wristwatch TV, before the teacher catches the student and confiscates it. Also features the reworked scene from The Flagstones pilot demo.
4	4	"No Help Wanted"	Warren Foster	October 21, 1960	P–6	N/A
After inadvertently causing Barney to lose his job, Fred helps him get another job. Barney gets hired to repossess furniture and is tasked with repossessing Fred's television set, much to his dismay. After a fight between Barney and Fred, the former manages to take the set back and even pays the television bill, allowing Fred to have it back. Note: This is the first episode in which Dino makes an appearance.
5	5	"The Split Personality"	Warren Foster	October 28, 1960	P–10	9.58
After Fred drops a bottle of car polish on his head, he undergoes a personality change, becoming a polite Englishman and going by the name "Frederick". Although Wilma is initially flattered by her husband's change of personality, she eventually grows fed up. After a threat from Fred and Barney's friends, whose wives demand that they be more like "Frederick", Barney, Wilma, and Betty manage to change Fred back to his old self by hitting him on the head with a rock. Note: Alan Reed's affected, cultured "Frederick" voice is similar to the popular "Falstaff Openshaw" poet character he played for many years on the Fred Allen radio show. In this episode Wilma breaks the fourth wall for the first time when she wonders if a man can be too nice.
6	6	"The Monster from the Tar Pits"	Warren Foster	November 4, 1960	P–14	9.49
A Hollyrock film company goes on location in Bedrock to film its new feature The Monster from the Tar Pits starring Gary Granite, Rock Pile, and Wednesday Tuesday. Wilma and Betty audition for small roles in the movie without success. However, Fred ends up getting hired as a stunt double for Granite and ends up doubling in pretty much every scene with Granite taking the credit. Despite being disappointed at this, Fred is eager to continue the role when he finds out that the film company is shooting a sequel due to the movie's success.
7	7	"The Babysitters"	Warren Foster	November 11, 1960	P–4	10.31
Fred and Barney reluctantly agree to babysit Edna Boulder's son, Egbert, which makes them miss a chance to go and see a wrestling match. A blackout of the event in their area prompts them to bring Egbert with them to their friend Joe Rockhead's house so they can watch the fight. When Fred and Barney mistakenly believe that Egbert has run away, this leads to a huge misunderstanding that results in them, as well as Joe Rockhead, getting arrested. Note: This episode is the first appearance of Joe Rockhead.
8	8	"At the Races"	Sydney Zelinka	November 18, 1960	P–7	10.03
To finance their dream of opening a pool hall, Fred and Barney visit the dinosaur racetrack where Fred bets his entire paycheck on a long shot. To cover for gambling, Fred pretends to have been beaten by a robber and tells Wilma that he has lost his check. When the longshot pays off, Fred and Barney are initially elated but quickly realize their problems are only beginning. Note: Betty is absent in this episode.
9	9	"The Engagement Ring"	Warren Foster	November 25, 1960	P–5	10.53
Barney decides to surprise Betty with a belated engagement ring, which he gives to Fred for safekeeping, but Wilma discovers the ring and assumes it is a gift for her. Not wanting to shatter her dream, Fred decides to buy a second ring but doesn't have the cash, so he talks Barney into competing with a boxing champ in order to win a $500 prize. Wilma and Betty soon discover the plot and persuade the champion to let Barney win, not wanting any harm to come to the latter. Despite this, the champion still beats Barney, knocking him unconscious. Furious, Wilma and Betty assault the champion for double-crossing them and force the champion's manager to give the $500 prize to Barney. Afterwards, Barney manages to buy a new ring for Betty.
10	10	"Hollyrock, Here I Come"	Warren Foster	December 2, 1960	P–12	11.21
Wilma and Betty win a trip to Hollyrock from a television contest. Finding themselves lonely and bored, Fred and Barney take vacations from work and follow them out. When Wilma is "discovered", Fred muscles his own way into the world of television to bring her back.
11	11	"The Golf Champion"	Sydney Zelinka	December 9, 1960	P–15	11.07
Having become the new president of the Loyal Order of Dinosaurs lodge, Barney disallows Fred to keep a trophy that he won in a golf match due to the latter not having paid his back dues. This leads to a war between the Flintstones and the Rubbles until Wilma and Betty put a stop to it by secretly paying Barney the back dues and giving Fred the cup themselves.
12	12	"The Sweepstakes Ticket"	Warren Foster	December 16, 1960	P–16	11.75
Fred buys a sweepstakes ticket that he decides to share with Barney, while Wilma and Betty buy one as well; they each attempt to keep the tickets a secret from each other, fearing that they would buy items for their selfish desires. Barney hides his and Fred's ticket in a coat, which Betty gives to a hobo, leading to an incident that nearly costs Fred and Barney their ticket. After that, Fred loses his trust in Barney and decides to sneak into his house to take it back but mistakenly takes the girls' ticket. In the end, the girls end up winning the sweepstakes, prompting Fred and Barney to get revenge by using the money on their desired items before their wives do.
13	13	"The Drive-In"	Warren Foster	December 23, 1960	P–8	N/A
Fed up with their jobs, Fred and Barney secretly plan to buy a drive-in restaurant with two girls applying as bellhops. After getting calls from the girls, Wilma and Betty mistakenly believe that Fred and Barney are cheating on them, which the two quickly cover up. When Wilma and Betty find out that their husbands have quit their jobs, they begin to search for them and eventually find them working at the restaurant. After Fred and Barney quit their jobs at the restaurant and get their old jobs back, Wilma and Betty humiliate them when they go out to dinner.
14	14	"The Prowler"	Joseph Barbera	December 30, 1960	P–3	10.65
With a prowler on the loose in Bedrock, Betty decides to take judo lessons to protect herself. When Wilma wants to take lessons also, Fred ridicules the idea, arguing that one glimpse of a prowler would send her running in fear. To prove his point, Fred poses as the prowler and sneaks into the Rubble household, on the same night the real prowler shows up.
15	15	"The Girls' Night Out"	Warren Foster	January 6, 1961	P–13	10.83
Following an argument with their wives over never going out, Fred and Barney decide to take them to an amusement park, which doesn't go over well. As they leave, Fred leaves behind a record that he recorded, which is discovered by a group of teenagers, who fall in love with Fred's singing voice. This leads to Fred becoming a famous singer nicknamed "Hi-Fye" and traveling on a world tour. Fred becomes conceited with the attention while Wilma and Betty get homesick, so they spread an ugly false rumor about "Hi-Fye" that ruins his reputation and ends his career, turning things back to normal.
16	16	"Arthur Quarry's Dance Class"	Warren Foster	January 13, 1961	P–20	12.62
Fred and Barney sign up for dance lessons at Arthur Quarry's so that they do not humiliate themselves at the charity ball. Their excuse that they have joined the volunteer fire department falls apart when Betty and Wilma realize that the all-stone town of Bedrock is fireproof (as well the alarm sounding at 7:30 every night). The wives then suspect that their husbands are slipping out to meet other women but are glad when they see they have been learning how to dance for them.
17	17	"The Big Bank Robbery"	Arthur Phillips	January 20, 1961	P–19	11.91
Fred and Barney discover a bag containing $86,000, which was stolen from the bank by a couple of crooks. When Fred and Barney attempt to return the money to the bank, they are mistaken for the bank robbers, forcing them to go into hiding. Wilma and Betty decide to lure the real crooks to the house in order to catch them, which almost works, but backfires when Fred and Barney return to take the money with them, resulting in the crooks capturing Barney and the girls. After Fred unknowingly stops the robbers from escaping, he exaggerates the story to make himself look good, but Barney, Wilma, and Betty have the last laugh when they use all of the reward money to buy all of the items they want, leaving the bill for Fred.
18	18	"The Snorkasaurus Hunter"	Warren Foster & Michael Maltese	January 27, 1961	P–11	12.90
Fred convinces Wilma and the Rubbles to go on a camping trip. During this, Fred and Barney hunt for a dinosaur called the "Snorkasaurus" and encounter one named "Dino". However, they are forced to let the dinosaur go when the girls befriend him and decide to take him home as a pet. Note: While this episode shows how they got Dino, he appeared previously in "Arthur Quarry's Dance Class", which was produced later. Also, Dino appeared even earlier in "No Help Wanted," so it's likely that this is a standalone origin episode.
19	19	"The Hot Piano"	Michael Maltese	February 3, 1961	P–18	12.62
To commemorate his 10th wedding anniversary (which he only remembers because it falls on "Trash Day"), Fred wants to buy Wilma a Stoneway piano, but after unsuccessfully dealing with snooty clerk Frank Nelson in a high-end music store, he finds a great deal from a shady, cash-only businessman named "88 Fingers Louie." Fred later realizes that it's more than he bargained for. This episode includes the catchy "Happy Anniversary" tune, sung by a quintet of four police officers and Barney, who is also playing the piano.
20	20	"The Hypnotist"	Warren Foster	February 10, 1961	P–17	11.87
While attempting to demonstrate his skill as a hypnotist to his wife and the Rubbles, Fred manages to hypnotize Barney into thinking that he is a frisky puppy but is unable to reverse the trick.
21	21	"Love Letters on the Rocks"	Arthur Phillips	February 17, 1961	P–21	12.80
Jealous Fred's discovery of a love poem that was sent to Wilma prompts him to hire Bedrock's top detective, Perry Gunnite (a parody of Peter Gunn), to find out who the home-wrecking poet is. When Gunnite's investigation mistakenly points to Barney, Fred plans revenge against his friend until Wilma reminds her husband that he had written the poem himself many years earlier during their courtship.
22	22	"The Tycoon"	Warren Foster	February 24, 1961	P–22	12.94
J.L. Gotrocks, a businessman who closely resembles Fred, decides to abandon his office. The tycoon's desperate employees find and entice Fred to take over his job, which soon becomes overwhelming. Meanwhile, the tycoon goes about town among the little people, encountering Wilma, Barney, and Betty, who all mistake him for Fred. Both Fred and the tycoon gradually are driven to return to their normal positions. (This episode has the rare usage of a narrator who breaks the "fourth wall".) Note: A few years later, the Season 5 episode "King for a Night" would have a similar storyline.
23	23	"The Astra' Nuts"	Warren Foster	March 3, 1961	P–23	11.91
Thinking they are undergoing an examination for insurance, Fred and Barney mistakenly sign up for a three-year stint in the Army. After a tearful goodbye from their wives, the guys enter into the service, where they quickly blunder their way into volunteering for the first lunar-landing mission after being conned into it.
24	24	"The Long, Long Weekend"	Warren Foster	March 10, 1961	P–24	12.76
Fred's old friend Gus Gravel (voiced by Willard Waterman) invites the Flintstones and Rubbles to his seaside hotel for an all-expense-paid vacation. However upon arriving, the foursome finds that the hotel's planned "activities" seem more like work, because the entire hotel staff has quit their jobs just prior to the foursome's arrival. Gus finally confesses the truth to his four new guests, adding further bad news in that a huge convention is about to arrive, and he needs the Flintstones and Rubbles to stay and work as hotel staff.
25	25	"In the Dough"	Arthur Phillips	March 17, 1961	P–25	12.80
Wilma and Betty are finalists in a television bake-off, but on the eve of the event, they contract measles. Donning full drag—including wigs, dresses, and plucked-out eyebrows—Fred and Barney take their places in the contest to prepare their "Upside-Down Flint/Rubble Bubble Cake," but the boys' carelessness could jeopardize the winning of the grand prize.
26	26	"The Good Scout"	Warren Foster	March 24, 1961	P–26	11.73
After the leader of a Boy Scout troop falls ill, Fred and Barney become the new leaders. During a camping trip, Fred blunders his way through until an overnight flood puts his and the rest of the troop's lives in danger. After the events, the scouts thank Fred for his courage.
27	27	"Rooms for Rent"	Warren Foster	March 31, 1961	P–27	12.05
Tired of hearing their husbands complain about finances, Wilma and Betty rent rooms to student musicians. Fred and Barney go along with the arrangement, unaware that their wives are providing the lodging in return for music and dancing lessons.
28	28	"Fred Flintstone: Before and After"	Warren Foster	April 7, 1961	P–28	12.71
Fred appears on a weight loss commercial, only to find out that he is the "before" example. In order to lose weight, Fred enters a contest to win $1,000 by losing 25 lbs. in a month. Unable to resist the urge to eat, Fred joins a club called "Food Anonymous", which prevents him from getting any unhealthy food. As the days go by, Fred begins to lose his sanity. At the end of the month, Fred successfully loses the weight and wins the money, but despite resigning from Food Anonymous, the club continues to prevent Fred from eating.

=== Season 2 (1961–62) ===
No. overall	No. in season	Title	Written by	Original release date	Prod. code	U.S. households (in millions)
29	1	"The Hit Song Writers"	Jack Raymond	September 15, 1961	P–31	N/A
Fred and Barney write a song with the help of a scammer who plagiarizes Hoagy Carmichael's "Stardust". When they unwittingly play this song for Hoagy and his agent, the agent throws them out of his office, but Hoagy forgives the two and after finding a poem Barney wrote. He later puts the poem to music and invites the Flintstones and Rubbles to a special dinner where the song is performed. Notes: "American songbook" legend Hoagy Carmichael became the first guest star on The Flintstones series, appearing as himself. He wrote the song "Yabba-Dabba-Dabba-Dabba-Doo" for this episode. Daws Butler voices Barney due to Mel Blanc's car accident.
30	2	"Droop-Along Flintstone"	Warren Foster	September 22, 1961	P–29	9.38
The Flintstones and Rubbles travel to the west to take care of a ranch belonging to Fred's wealthy cousins, Tumbleweed and Mary Lou Jim. After Fred and Barney separate from the ranch, they run into a group of actors, who are performing in a Western television series; thinking that they are actual cowpokes, they flee from them, only to be attacked by a tribe of "Indians" (who are also actors). Upon seeing their husbands in danger, Wilma and Betty attack the "Indians" and rescue their husbands. When Tumbleweed and Mary Lou Jim return to the ranch, they disbelieve the Flintstones' and Rubbles' claims about the Indians until they get attacked by them themselves. Note: Daws Butler voices Barney due to Mel Blanc's car accident.
31	3	"The Missing Bus"	Larry Markes	September 29, 1961	P–37	9.76
Quitting his 13-year quarry job because he's offered a new job at lower pay, Fred becomes a school bus driver for the route between Bedrock and Red Rock. First appearance of Mr. Slate as Mr. Granite.
32	4	"Alvin Brickrock Presents"	Larry Markes	October 6, 1961	P–40	9.94
Fred, reading too many excerpts from Arnold the newsboy's detective magazine, suspects his new neighbor has killed his wife. Note: The title spoofs Alfred Hitchcock Presents and the plot spoofs Hitchcock's film Rear Window. This episode was entered in the 1962 Monte Carlo Television Festival attended by Princess Grace.
33	5	"Fred Flintstone Woos Again"	Jack Raymond	October 13, 1961	P–30	10.60
Fred takes Wilma on a second honeymoon, only to find out that the judge who originally married them was unlicensed. Wilma tries to play hard-to-get because she is unhappy with the way Fred has been acting recently. Note: Daws Butler voices Barney due to Mel Blanc's car accident.
34	6	"The Rock Quarry Story"	Warren Foster	October 20, 1961	P–32	N/A
Rock Quarry, tired of Hollyrock, moves to Bedrock. Wilma and Betty know immediately that he is Rock Quarry, while Fred and Barney continue to believe that he is going by his alias, 'Gus Schultz.' Note: Daws Butler voices Barney due to Mel Blanc's car accident.
35	7	"The Soft Touchables"	Sydney Zelinka & Arthur Phillips	October 27, 1961	P–34	10.46
Fred and Barney become very unsuccessful detectives who are unable to catch anyone doing anything wrong, but wind up getting in real trouble with both the law and some real criminals who try to murder Fred and Barney.
36	8	"Flintstone of Prinstone"	Larry Markes	November 3, 1961	P–35	11.49
Fred goes to Prinstone University's (Parody of Princeton University) night classes to impress his boss into giving him a raise, but winds up becoming a star player on Prinstone's football team.
37	9	"The Little White Lie"	Herbert Finn	November 10, 1961	P–33	10.27
Fred lies to Wilma about going to a poker game after she finds extra money on him, and he goes through great lengths not to get caught in a lie. Note: Daws Butler voices Barney due to Mel Blanc's car accident.
38	10	"Social Climbers"	Warren Foster	November 17, 1961	P–38	11.40
Wilma and Betty get tickets to an exclusive and prestigious social event, making Fred and Barney decide to go to charm school in order to prepare for the event.
39	11	"The Beauty Contest"	Warren Foster	December 1, 1961	P–36	11.07
Fred and Barney are appointed judges for the Water Buffalo beauty contest, but the job becomes tougher than they originally thought when Fred's boss pressures him into rigging the contest. But ultimately, a swimsuit clad Wilma and Betty steal the show.
40	12	"The Masquerade Ball"	Jack Raymond	December 8, 1961	P–42	9.85
Fred buys tickets to a costume ball from his boss. Later, at the ball, he mistakes his boss for another guest.
41	13	"The Picnic"	Jack Raymond	December 15, 1961	P–41	9.30
Fred dumps Barney as his partner at the lodge picnic for Joe Rockhead, causing Barney to resent Fred.
42	14	"The House Guest"	Sydney Zelinka	December 22, 1961	P–39	N/A
The Rubbles are forced to move in with Fred and Wilma while a plumber fixes Fred's "repair job," which did far more harm than the Rubbles' original problem. What began as a simple leak ends up becoming a very major, week-long plumbing job. During the Rubbles' stay, Barney causes so many problems for Fred that he finally loses his patience and gets angry at Barney. Meanwhile, Betty gets mad at Wilma and begins to fight with her.
43	15	"The X-Ray Story"	Warren Foster	December 29, 1961	P–43	10.93
Dino's x-rays are mistaken for Fred's. Wilma, Betty, and Barney consequently think Fred has caught Dino's illness ("dinopeptitis"). This makes them keep Fred awake for 72 hours straight without telling him and take a trip to the roller skating rink, where Fred falls asleep on his skates despite having twenty or thirty cups of coffee. First of five appearances of Baby Puss.
44	16	"The Gambler"	Warren Foster	January 5, 1962	P–45	12.59
Fred's compulsive gambling problem causes him to lose all his furniture and his television set to his nemesis, Arnold the paperboy.
45	17	"A Star is Almost Born"	Arthur Phillips	January 12, 1962	P–47	11.86
Wilma and Betty stumble upon a groupie hangout to hopefully land a role in a movie, but instead they wind up being hired to do a commercial. Note: When Wilma practices "room entering," it is a spoof of the popular Loretta Young Show, in which the star swirled through the door to open her program. Saying goodnight to the TV audience with a big "mwaah" kiss was Dinah Shore's variety show trademark.
46	18	"The Entertainer"	Arthur Phillips	January 19, 1962	P–44	11.56
To please his boss, Fred agrees to entertain a woman named Greta Gravel (voiced by Paula Winslowe) by taking her out for a few nights. Greta soon runs into Wilma, who shows up at the same restaurant with Barney and Betty. As Fred's bad luck would have it, Wilma and Greta were high school classmates and Fred can't be seen out with another woman, nor can he abandon his boss' business client. Note: Mr. Slate's first name is "Howard" in this episode and Fred calls him "H.B.". This is the first time Wilma's maiden name, "Pebble," is mentioned in the series.
47	19	"Wilma's Vanishing Money"	Harvey Bullock	January 26, 1962	P–46	12.40
Fred steals Wilma's money to buy a bowling ball, and tells Wilma it was a burglar. She, meanwhile, was planning to use the money to buy Fred the ball he wanted for his birthday.
48	20	"Feudin' and Fussin'"	Arthur Phillips	February 2, 1962	P–50	12.01
Fred chews Barney out and then calls him stupid after he learns his Saturday golf game was cancelled and refuses to apologize, triggering a feud between the two friends. Things really begin to get out of hand when Barney puts his house up for sale, while Yippy Ye O'Rock, a rich Texan shows an interest in buying the property.
49	21	"Impractical Joker"	Warren Foster	February 9, 1962	P–49	11.71
Barney gets even with Fred because of his practical jokes he's been pulling on him from time after time, so Barney pretends to be a counterfeiter in his basement with the money he won in a slogan contest and Fred thinks the money is fake and will land him in jail. Meanwhile, Wilma and Betty try to cure the both of them of their practical joking. Note: Barney and Fred both break the fourth wall in this episode. Barney, before whispering his practical joke scheme to Betty, and Fred, as he strolls over to Barney's house to investigate the 'basement activities.'
50	22	"Operation Barney"	Tony Benedict	February 16, 1962	P–48	11.52
Fred and Barney play hooky from work to see a ball game. Their plans are foiled when Barney must report to his company's nurse who, after Fred fixes Barney's condition to make it look like he has a 312 degree fever, is alarmed enough to send him to the hospital. Fred pretends to be a doctor and give Barney "operation" to get Barney out of the hospital. After finally escaping from the hospital, it's discovered that the ball game was actually scheduled for that evening – not that afternoon, as the guys had thought – and that Barney's boss had tickets for Fred and Barney to go, but because Barney was "sick," he gave the tickets away to someone else.
51	23	"The Happy Household"	Warren Foster	February 23, 1962	P–51	10.88
Wilma accidentally becomes the host of the new TV cooking show "The Happy Housewife" produced by Mr. Rockenschpeel, which becomes popular with all of Bedrock – except Fred, who isn't a "happy pappy" as he must go without his wife's home-cooked meals. Note: B. J. Baker sings two songs as Wilma: "(Won't You Come Home) Bill Bailey" and the "Rockenschpeel Jingle"
52	24	"Fred Strikes Out"	Joanna Lee	March 2, 1962	P–53	11.56
Fred has a bowling match on the night of the anniversary of Wilma accepting his marriage proposal, so he attempts to take her out at the same time he goes bowling.
53	25	"This is Your Lifesaver"	Larry Markes	March 9, 1962	P–52	11.96
After Fred and Barney "save the life" of J. Montague Gypsum, a confidence man, they end up stuck taking care of him.
54	26	"Trouble-in-Law"	Joanna Lee	March 16, 1962	P–56	11.47
In a direct continuation of the previous episode (where Wilma announced her mother's impending arrival), Fred's mother-in-law comes for a long and difficult visit. Fred, meanwhile, tries to find a way to get rid of her. Note: Verna Felton makes her first guest appearance as Wilma's mother. She was not given the name of "Mrs. Slaghoople" until near the end of season four in "Bachelor Daze," when Janet Waldo became the voice. Wilma's maiden name was first mentioned in episode 18 of this season ("The Entertainer") as "Pebble."
55	27	"The Mailman Cometh"	Arthur Phillips	March 23, 1962	P–55	11.32
After Fred thinks he's been singled out for not receiving his annual raise, he mails his boss, Mr. Slate, an angry letter. Then, Slate visits the Flintstone residence to personally apologize for the inadvertent error and announces to Wilma that Fred is, indeed, getting his raise. Fred tries to get the letter back before Mr. Slate receives it and fires him.
56	28	"The Rock Vegas Story"	Warren Foster	March 30, 1962	P–54	11.12
While eating out with Barney at an automat, Fred stumbles into an old school friend, Sherman, who is now the owner of a Rock Vegas hotel. After Sherman extends an invitation to visit his casino, the Flintstones and the Rubbles head off to Rock Vegas. Before they even get the chance to check in, Fred has already gambled all of the foursome's money away, but Sherman invites them to stay at the hotel by working off their charges.
57	29	"Divided We Sail"	Larry Markes	April 6, 1962	P–57	9.75
Barney becomes a contestant on a TV game show, The Prize is Priced (a takeoff on The Price is Right). He wins a houseboat, and everyone goes on a disastrous cruise where a sea serpent pulls the boat way off shore.
58	30	"Kleptomaniac Caper"	Joanna Lee	April 13, 1962	P–58	11.07
Fred mistakenly thinks Barney is a kleptomaniac.
59	31	"Latin Lover"	Harvey Bullock	April 20, 1962	P–59	N/A
After watching a romantic movie on TV, Wilma convinces Fred to adopt a "Latin lover" image. She soon becomes (erroneously) convinced that other women are after Fred because of his suave image and tries to convince him to go back to being the same old Fred. Note: Alan Reed again uses the cultured "Falstaff Openshaw" voice previously heard in the episode "The Split Personality." Mr. Slate's first name is now "Harry."
60	32	"Take Me Out to the Ball Game"	Larry Markes	April 27, 1962	P–60	N/A
Barney becomes a baseball coach to a bunch of boys while Fred becomes an umpire.

=== Season 3 (1962–63) ===
The intro changes this season (starting with "Barney the Invisible"). This time around starting with Fred leaving work and meeting Wilma, Dino and Baby Puss to go the Bedrock Drive-In Theater.

No. overall	No. in season	Title	Written by	Original release date	Prod. code	U.S. households (millions)
61	1	"Dino Goes Hollyrock"	Harvey Bullock	September 14, 1962	P–62	8.62
Dino becomes a star on the TV show Sassie (a parody of Lassie) while Fred is hoping to cash in on Dino's success. Note: This was the first episode that ABC aired in color.
62	2	"Fred's New Boss"	Warren Foster	September 21, 1962	P–61	8.32
Barney gets laid off and Fred gets him a job at the quarry. Barney is immediately promoted to Fred's boss, causing Fred to be jealous that Barney is promoted so quickly. Note: This is the last episode to use the original "Rise and Shine" opening and end credits.
63	3	"Barney the Invisible"	Warren Foster	September 28, 1962	P–64	8.22
Fred tries to cure Barney's hiccups with a potion of experiment # 112 that he invented, vanishing Barney's hiccups along with him. Note: This is the first episode of the show to use "Meet the Flintstones" as the theme song for the opening and end credits.
64	4	"Bowling Ballet"	Warren Foster	October 5, 1962	P–65	9.11
Fred has a problem with bowling and takes ballet lessons to regain his skills for a big tournament. Note: Fred does ballet again to be "cultured" in episode 165 - "My Fair Freddy."
65	5	"The Twitch"	Joanna Lee	October 12, 1962	P–63	8.42
Fred gets pop star Rock Roll to perform at Wilma's club function. When Rock suffers laryngitis pursuant to an allergic reaction (to pickled dodo eggs) and cannot perform, Fred comes to the rescue by donning Rock's costume and lip-syncing to his hit record.
66	6	"Here's Snow in Your Eyes"	Joanna Lee	October 19, 1962	P–68	9.06
Fred and Barney go on a ski trip and tell Wilma and Betty to stay home. Jealous, Wilma and Betty secretly follow them on their trip, during which the two men inadvertently catch a trio of jewel thieves.
67	7	"The Buffalo Convention"	Warren Foster	October 26, 1962	P–67	N/A
Fred, Barney, and the other members of the Loyal Order of Water Buffaloes are informed that they'll be going to Frantic City (a parody of Atlantic City, New Jersey) for a convention for three days — without the wives. Their wives are lulled into agreement by a phony "doctor" (in actuality, the lodge's plumber) who convinces them that their husbands need an out-of-town break for a few days. Meanwhile, Fred buys a talking dodo bird named Doozy for Wilma. Naturally, once the boys leave, Doozy informs Wilma about the husbands' entire plan, so Wilma and Betty and the other Water Buffalo wives follow them to Frantic City. Note: Some elements of the plot might have been inspired by the Laurel and Hardy motion picture Sons of the Desert.
68	8	"The Little Stranger" "The Little Visitor"	Herbert Finn	November 2, 1962	P–69	8.27
Fred overhears portions of a conversation that Wilma and Betty have about taking in a "little visitor" and Fred thinks Wilma is having a baby. He asks his mother-in-law to stay to help Wilma with the arrival of their baby, but, to Fred's chagrin, the "little visitor" turns out to be the Flintstones' paperboy, Arnold.
69	9	"Baby Barney"	Warren Foster	November 9, 1962	P–66	9.06
Fred's rich Uncle Tex is coming for a visit, and to stay on Tex's short list of inheriting his uncle's money, Fred had told Tex that Wilma had a baby boy and named him after his uncle.
70	10	"Hawaiian Escapade"	Joanna Lee	November 16, 1962	P–71	9.51
Fred wins a contest to go to Hawaii and be on a TV show, Hawaiian Spy (a reference to ABC's Hawaiian Eye). He is given a role as a stunt double for star "Larry Lava", but it's Wilma that turns out to be the big star instead.
71	11	"Ladies' Day"	Harvey Bullock	November 23, 1962	P–70	8.91
Fred dresses up as a woman just to see a baseball game on "ladies' day" with Barney due to their mutual lack of money.
72	12	"Nuthin' But the Tooth"	Tony Benedict	November 30, 1962	P–72	10.16
Barney has a toothache, so in order to have enough money for a boxing match featuring Heavyweight Champion of the World Floyd Patterstone (Floyd Patterson), Fred takes Barney to a veterinary dentist instead of one for humans. Due to the dentist's long telephone call from his wife and Barney's continued exposure to anesthetic gases during the phone call, Barney floats out of the dentist's office. The nurse watches Barney float by and matter of factly says, "Oh! there goes another one. We lose more darn patients that way." A panicked Fred tries to follow Barney to bring him down, but soon both are flying high above Bedrock. Second of five appearances of Baby Puss. Note: In real life, Patterson was no longer the champion when this episode aired. He had been succeeded by Sonny Liston.
73	13	"High School Fred"	Warren Foster	December 7, 1962	P–73	9.31
In order to keep his job, Fred must return to high school in order to earn the diploma that he was unable to earn years before and winds up making friends with the kids in the school.
74	14	"Dial 'S' for Suspicion"	Herbert Finn	December 14, 1962	P–74	9.46
When Fred sees Wilma reading a novel, he worries that she is planning on murdering him to collect life insurance money after a few near accidents. Note: This is a parody of Dial M for Murder and Suspicion. This is the second episode in which Wilma's last name is "Pebble," this time by an old boyfriend named Rodney. The later name of "Slaghoople" was not mentioned in any early episode in the series and was introduced in season four.
75	15	"Flash Gun Freddie"	Jack Raymond	December 21, 1962	P–75	9.96
Fred and Barney take up photography as a hobby during their vacation from work.
76	16	"The Kissing Burglar"	Joanna Lee	January 4, 1963	P–76	9.86
A romantic burglar is targeting Fred's neighborhood and befriends Wilma before getting caught.
77	17	"Wilma, the Maid"	Harvey Bullock & R.S. Allen	January 11, 1963	P–78	10.36
In order to impress his boss, Fred decides to hire a maid, Lollobrickida to make his boss a nice dinner, but after Fred promises to sing to her, she quietly quits and Wilma poses as the maid in disguise.
78	18	"The Hero"	Herbert Finn	January 18, 1963	P–79	9.91
Barney saves a baby's life when a runaway carriage rides by, but when he hands Fred the baby before the newspaper reporters and police arrive, Fred takes the credit. Fred then fights with his somewhat nasty conscience for taking credit as a hero.
79	19	"The Surprise"	Warren Foster	January 25, 1963	P–81	10.51
Fred resents Barney spending so much time taking care of his nephew Marblehead to the point their friendship nearly ends. At the end of the episode, Wilma informs Fred that they are going to be having a baby of their own. Note: In this episode, Fred breaks the fourth wall when he says the Flintstones are going to have a baby.
80	20	"Mother-in-Law's Visit"	Warren Foster	February 1, 1963	P–82	12.25
Fred's mother-in-law visits to help get Wilma ready for the new baby, making Fred miserable. Fred takes a job as a cab driver in disguise and makes all his money for the night driving his mother-in-law around.
81	21	"Foxy Grandma"	Herbert Finn	February 8, 1963	P–80	11.55
After his mother-in-law leaves, Fred goes through three housekeepers and finally finds an elderly lady that he is happy with. However, this sweet old lady turns out to be a bank robber named Grandma Dynamite. Note: This was the last episode in which Verna Felton was the voice of Wilma's mother, who was never referred to by name but "Mother." Wilma's maiden name was "Pebble" in two previous episodes. The name "Slaghoople" was not introduced until season four.
82	22	"Fred's New Job"	Warren Foster	February 15, 1963	P–83	11.55
Fred needs a raise in order to pay the expenses of having a new baby arrive. He wants to ask the boss for a raise, but Mr. Slate puts on an act in front of Fred where he pretends to fire another employee for asking. Fred gets fired "for his own good" anyway after Barney dresses up as another employer and states that he wants to hire Fred for twice the money Mr. Slate is paying. Fred then has several jobs, but is fired from each one. After taking a circus job, Mr. Slate finds Fred and rehires him with a huge raise.
83	23	"The Blessed Event" "The Dress Rehearsal"	Harvey Bullock & R.S. Allen	February 22, 1963	P–84	12.90
In order to prepare for the new baby, Fred and Barney do a dress rehearsal of taking Wilma to the hospital. Note: This is the third of five appearances of Baby Puss.
84	24	"Carry On, Nurse Fred"	Story by : Michael Maltese; Teleplay by : Joanna Lee	March 1, 1963	P–85	11.85
Fred has a tough time with the nurse that his mother-in-law sends to help Wilma with caring for the newborn baby, Pebbles. Fred fires her and takes over, but fails miserably. Note: Fred's remarks of baby physician "Dr. Rock" is a spoof reference to Dr. Benjamin Spock.
85	25	"Ventriloquist Barney"	Story by : Michael Maltese; Teleplay by : Herbert Finn	March 8, 1963	P–86	12.35
Fred gets mad with Barney's ventriloquist joke that he pulled on him, claiming Pebbles could speak. Later, Barney comes over and calls a truce with him and he gets himself and Fred tickets to a big wrestling match. Fred calls a babysitter to watch Pebbles, but she comes over and parties instead of babysitting Pebbles. So Barney suggests that he and Fred sneak off with Pebbles to the big wrestling match that Wilma and Betty are watching on television.
86	26	"The Big Move"	Joanna Lee	March 22, 1963	P–87	10.61
Fred moves the family to an upper-class neighborhood to improve Pebbles's life, but in the end decides their old neighborhood with Barney and Betty is the best thing. Notes: This episode was edited on the Season 3 DVD set, however it isn't on the complete series Blu-ray. The DVD set misses a scene of Fred at work right after the night of him jumping into the pool & the teaser at the beginning.
87	27	"Swedish Visitors"	Harvey Bullock & R.S. Allen	March 29, 1963	P–88	10.61
Wilma borrows money from a bank account and in order to get it back, she rents the Flintstones' house to some Swedish musicians without Fred's knowledge while they take a camping trip. When Fred drives a sleeping Wilma and Pebbles back home, he finds the Swedish musicians there and he and Barney attempt to get rid of them. Notes: Yogi Bear (voiced by Daws Butler) and Boo-Boo make a cameo appearance. The Swedish singer Owe Thörnqvist provides guest vocals.
88	28	"The Birthday Party"	Joanna Lee	April 5, 1963	P–77	10.31
Fred says that he "doesn't want a birthday surprise party," although he really does. Barney tries to get him away from the real surprise party until everything is ready. Note: This episode indeed airs as episode 88, but it was made prior to episodes 79–87. Episodes 79–87 are all about the coming of Pebbles, their baby. In this episode, it is stated that Fred and Wilma still have no children.

=== Season 4 (1963–64) ===
The intro changes twice in this season. In the beginning of the season, Pebbles is added into the intro. Starting with "Big League Freddie", the Rubbles (including Bamm Bamm) are added.

No. overall	No. in season	Title	Written by	Original release date	Prod. code	U.S. households (in millions)
89	1	"Ann-Margrock Presents"	Harvey Bullock & R.S. Allen	September 19, 1963	P _101	8.32
Ann-Margrock (special guest star Ann-Margret, providing her own voice) comes to town for a big concert and stays with the Flintstones, who do not know who she is. After a few tries, Fred and Barney both get on Ann-Margrock's show at the newly constructed Hollyrock Bowl. Note: During this season, ABC moved the series from Fridays to Thursday nights. This episode was scheduled for production later in the season, but ABC asked that it air as a season premiere, so Hanna-Barbera was suddenly given an even more rapid production schedule than usual, yet they managed to deliver one of the show's most memorable episodes in record time. Ann-Margrock was designed by cartoonist Doug Wildey, who was also a major creative contributor to Hanna-Barbera's Jonny Quest series.The Slate Company Dentist [for Dinosaur machines] "Dr. Ben Cavity" is a spoof of Dr. Ben Casey. The 4th season teaser shows baby Pebbles being picked up while playing with building blocks. The Pebbles Playing with Building Blocks Teaser is on this episode on the Complete series Blu-ray.
90	2	"Groom Gloom"	Herbert Finn	September 26, 1963	P_90	8.72
Arnold the paper boy annoys Fred as he is playing with Pebbles when he jokes that they will get married when they grow up. Fred then has a bad dream of 20 years in the future in which he is a 60 year Old man who finds that Arnold grows up and becomes the local hero then takes his job at the quarry, his pride as a pool player and bowler, the Leader of his Water Buffalo Lodge, his friendship with Barney, and marries an eloping teenage Pebbles. Notes: Janet Waldo guest-stars as teenage Pebbles. Running gags: Fred accidentally hitting his head; Fred being hit by Arnold's stone newspapers; Fred losing bets with Arnold. In the dream, after being married 25 years, the Rubbles remarry each other.
91	3	"Little Bamm-Bamm"	Warren Foster	October 3, 1963	P_103	10.05
Fred gets tired of Barney and Betty's daily visits to play with Pebbles and kicks them out telling they to get their own baby. Although Fred soon feels guilty and apologizes for his thoughtless remark, the Rubbles still yearn for their own child and wish on a falling star. The next day, Barney and Betty discover a baby boy on their doorstep named Bamm-Bamm (named for his extreme strength) along with a note asking that he be cared for. Quickly falling in love with the child, Barney and Betty decide to legally adopt him, but their application is turned down in favor of a wealthy family called the "Stonyfellers". The Rubbles sue the Stonyfellers for custody of Bamm-Bamm and while the Rubbles lose the case, Mr. Stonyfeller allows them to keep Bamm-Bamm after finding out that his wife is pregnant. Notes: In this episode Barney breaks the fourth wall when he bets that the viewers at home can guess what he and Betty wished for. The Rubbles' attorney "Bronto Burger" is a spoof of Perry Mason adversary "Hamilton Burger." His opponent "Perry Masonry" is a spoof of "Perry Mason." The Pebbles Playing with Building Blocks Teaser is on this episode in the Complete series Blu-ray.
92	4	"Dino Disappears"	Joanna Lee	October 10, 1963	P_89	10.11
Fred mistakenly forgets the anniversary of Dino's arrival in the Flintstone household and gets gifts for Pebbles instead. Dino gets jealous and Fred drags Dino outside. The next day, Dino is missing. Fred and Barney search for Dino, and they think he's been kidnapped by a man and according to the man, his name is "Rocky" and he is a stunt/dancing animal and they plan to get him back. Later at night, Fred and Barney takes "Rocky" and are chased by cops and they wind up in court and the real Dino pops up in court while being chased by dogcatchers. Because of his big mouth, Fred ends up living in Dino's doghouse for a week. Note: The Pebbles Playing with Building Blocks Teaser is on this episode on the Complete series Blu-ray.
93	5	"Fred's Monkeyshines"	Joanna Lee	October 17, 1963	P_91	9.70
Fred gets eyeglasses and takes the wrong ones. He then mistakes a monkey for Pebbles at the circus. Note: The Pebbles Playing with Building Blocks Teaser is on this episode on the Complete series Blu-ray.
94	6	"The Flintstone Canaries"	Barry E. Blitzer	October 24, 1963	P_92	11.49
Fred and Barney enter a singing contest as the Flintstone Canaries on the Hum Along with Herman Show. Notes: This episode is a spoof of the then-popular NBC TV series Sing Along with Mitch, starring Mitch Miller. The Pebbles Playing with Building Blocks Teaser is on this episode on the Complete series Blu-ray.
95	7	"Glue for Two"	Tony Benedict	October 31, 1963	P_93	7.90
Fred and Barney get glued together on Barney's new bowling ball after Fred tries to invent a soda drink in Experiment # 778 and instead invents a new super-strong superglue. Notes: This is the first of several episodes in which grape juice is mentioned in the script, as Welch's was a sponsor of the Flintstones during it first run on ABC-TV. The Pebbles Playing with Building Blocks Teaser is on this episode in the Complete series Blu-ray.
96	8	"Big League Freddie"	Story by : Rick Mittleman; Teleplay by : Walter Black	November 7, 1963	P_94	10.36
Fred tries out for a Major League Baseball team. Fred is injured during his tryout with his friend Roger Marble. When Roger is picked, he is mistaken for Fred who, after much pressure, comes clean. Note: This is the first episode to include the Rubbles in the show's intro.
97	9	"Old Lady Betty"	Walter Black	November 14, 1963	P_95	10.67
Betty gets a part-time job to earn money enough to get Barney a rocking chair running errands for an elderly lady. Betty disguises herself as an elderly lady as well with Wilma's help. The elderly lady, however is actually a counterfeiter gun moll named Greta Gravel and sends Betty to the store to buy small purchases with fake 100 dollar bills in order to get authentic money. Note: This is the only episode to focus on Betty. Around this time, Bea Benederet was for the first time in her career, playing the lead in the CBS sitcom Petticoat Junction. She would be replaced in season five of The Flintstones and among the reasons given was her conflicting schedule, as Hanna-Barbera recorded the voices as an ensemble. Betty does not appear in this season's episode, "Kleptomaniac Pebbles" perhaps due to scheduling.
98	10	"Sleep On, Sweet Fred"	Joanna Lee	November 21, 1963	P_96	9.75
Wilma and Betty start to use "sleep suggestions" on Fred and Barney each evening in order to get lavish gifts and nicer treatment. They are inadvertently overheard by Fred and Barney and their plan backfires when Fred and Barney pretend to make plans to steal from a store to give Wilma and Betty mink coats. Note: Wilma and Betty watch "Open Mouth with Peter Rockbind," a satirical reference to erudite talk show host David Susskind. "Kirsten Flagstone" perhaps references operatic soprano Dorothy Kirsten (the original name for The Flintstones was "The Flagstones"), but more likely references Kirsten Flagstad.
99	11	"Kleptomaniac Pebbles"	Barry E. Blitzer	November 28, 1963	P_97	8.77
Pebbles quietly takes things from various stores, but at a jewelry store, a real thief named Baffles Gravel, alias "Lightfingers Leo", plants a diamond necklace in Pebbles' carriage and Fred thinks Pebbles stole that as well. Note: Betty is absent in this episode.
100	12	"Daddy's Little Beauty"	Herbert Finn	December 5, 1963	P_99	10.62
Fred believes he enters Pebbles in a beauty contest for babies when he actually enters her in a beauty contest for young women. He decides to hide it from Wilma after she refuses to allow Pebbles to enter a beauty contest, and tries to sneak her into the beauty contest without Wilma knowing.
101	13	"Daddies Anonymous"	Warren Foster	December 12, 1963	P–98	10.88
In order to get out of doing weekend housework, Fred and Barney join a club where fathers bring their babies to the club and leave them at the parking lot while they play cards.
102	14	"Peek-a-Boo Camera"	Barry E. Blitzer	December 19, 1963	P–102	10.82
Fred, Barney, Betty, and Wilma all enjoy a television show called Peek-A-Boo Camera. Fred and Barney attend a friend's bachelor party, telling the wives that their friend is near death and they are seeing him for the last time. The bachelor party winds up being televised for Peek-A-Boo Camera. When Fred and Barney find out, they try to have their scene cut out so their wives don't see them. Note: This episode is a spoof of Candid Camera.
103	15	"Once Upon a Coward"	Herbert Finn	December 26, 1963	P–105	N/A
When Fred gets mugged, he starts to think Wilma believes he is a coward. To try to make Wilma think he's not a coward, Fred plots to nab the mugger and actually succeeds with his bowling ball! In two running gags Fred keeps "reenacting the crime" and gets "flipped" by everyone-including Arnold the newsboy! Fred also tries to "Prove His courage" by fighting a Prizefighter and becoming a Circus tiger tamer. Note: Prizefighter "Sonny Dempstone" is a spoof of prizefighter Sonny Liston, but his name is a portmanteau of Sonny Liston and Jack Dempsey.
104	16	"Ten Little Flintstones"	Tony Benedict	January 2, 1964	P–104	10.93
Invaders from outer space make ten robots that look like Fred. These ten look-alikes begin to wreak havoc on Fred, his family, friends, and even his job. Fourth of five appearances of Baby Puss
105	17	"Fred El Terrifico"	Joanna Lee	January 9, 1964	P–106	11.44
Fred, Wilma, Betty, and Barney take a trip to Rockapulco, where jewel thieves pretend to befriend Fred in order to frame him for stealing more jewels while in Mexirock. Note: Janet Waldo now voices Wilma's mother in place of Verna Felton. This is the first time in the entire series where Wilma's mother is called "Mrs. Slaghoople." Wilma's last name is "Pebble" in season two's "The Entertainer" and season three's "Dial 'S' for Suspicion."
106	18	"The Bedrock Hillbillies"	Herbert Finn	January 16, 1964	P–100	12.62
The Hatrocks become depressed when they think the last of the Flintstones, with whom they have been feuding for 90 years, has died. They soon realize that one Flintstone family – Fred's – is still living. Fred receives notification that he is the sole heir to the Flintstone estate and travels to claim it, taking his family and the Rubbles with him. Once at the Flintstone family cabin, the Hatrocks resume their feud. Note: This is the first of two appearances by the Hatrocks, who would return in episode 133. The show's title is a spoof of The Beverly Hillbillies; Flintstones Arkanstone "shack" "San Cemente" is a spoof of Richard Nixon home San Clemente; the picture of great-grandmother Mona Hatrock is a spoof of Whistler's Mother.
107	19	"Flintstone and the Lion"	Tony Benedict	January 23, 1964	P–107	11.18
On a fishing trip, Fred finds what he thinks is a kitten. He takes the kitten home as a pet – which soon grows into a lion – and Fred must try to find a way to get rid of the lion, before it eats them out of house.
108	20	"Cave Scout Jamboree"	Warren Foster	January 30, 1964	P–108	11.70
Fred causes a flood at work and is laid off for a week. He decides to take his family and The Rubbles on a camping trip, where a bunch of cave scouts from all around the world are holding a jamboree.
109	21	"Room for Two"	Tony Benedict	February 6, 1964	P–110	11.34
Fred and Barney build a new room onto Fred's house. After a fight, Barney discovers that the room is half on his property. As a result, they have to share the room and their fighting continues.
110	22	"Ladies' Night at the Lodge"	Herbert Finn	February 13, 1964	P–109	11.54
Wilma and Betty are curious about what goes on at Fred and Barney's Water Buffalo Lodge meetings so they sneak in wearing disguises as men.
111	23	"Reel Trouble"	Barry E. Blitzer	February 20, 1964	P–111	11.08
Fred gets into all kinds of trouble when he becomes addicted to taking home movies of Pebbles with his movie camera and showing them to his friends.
112	24	"Son of Rockzilla"	Barry E. Blitzer	February 27, 1964	P–113	11.85
A Hollyrock film company decides to go to Bedrock to film its new feature Son of Rockzilla, and Fred is enlisted to play the monster.
113	25	"Bachelor Daze"	Story by : Ralph Goodman; Teleplay by : Herbert Finn	March 5, 1964	P–112	11.34
The Honeyrock Hotel, where Fred and Barney first met Wilma and Betty, is in danger of being torn down. The Flintstones and Rubbles reminisce about when they first met. Note: Betty's full maiden is revealed for the first time to be Betty Jean McBricker. Janet Waldo is the voice of Wilma's mother for the second time.
114	26	"Operation Switchover"	Joanna Lee	March 12, 1964	P–114	11.80
Fred and Wilma trade roles and Fred must clean the house and make appetizers when visitors come to inspect the house for a contest that Wilma has entered. Note: This is the final episode where Bea Benaderet does the voice of Betty Rubble.

=== Season 5 (1964–65) ===
Gerry Johnson replaces Bea Benaderet as the voice of Betty Rubble starting with this season.

No. overall	No. in season	Title	Written by	Original release date	Prod. code	Viewers (millions)
115	1	"Hop Happy"	Warren Foster	September 17, 1964	P–116	11.57
Hoppy, the new pet that Barney and Betty got for Bamm Bamm, causes major havoc and nearly ends Barney's friendship with Fred.
116	2	"Monster Fred"	Barry E. Blitzer	September 24, 1964	P–118	5.68
Fred reverts to childhood after getting hit on the head with a bowling ball. After looking for a doctor, Barney finds a mad scientist that uses electric shock to swap personalities. Note: Mad scientist "Len Frankenstone" is a caricature of Vince Edwards as TV's "Ben Casey," accompanied by a caricature of Sam Jaffe's Dr. Zorba character.
117	3	"Itty Bitty Fred"	Tony Benedict	October 1, 1964	P–119	6.94
Fred begins inventing again with experiment # 779 and creates a reducing formula called "Fred-O-Cal" to take off weight. This formula winds up shrinking Fred to less than a foot tall. Can Fred and Barney make it "big" with a ventriloquism act in Hollyrock? Note: Ed Sullivan is again caricatured in this episode as "Ed Sullystone" (previously seen in the season three episode "The Twitch"). The reducing formula "Fred-O-Cal" is surely a reference to the early-1960s product Metrecal.
118	4	"Pebbles' Birthday Party"	Tony Benedict	October 8, 1964	P–115	7.74
Fred makes arrangements for Pebbles' first birthday and the Water Buffalo Lodge parties. Trouble ensues when the only caterer in town muddles the parties, including sending a clown to the Water Buffalo Lodge and dancing girls to Pebbles' birthday party, and Fred gets blamed for it. Note: Fifth and final appearance of Baby Puss.
119	5	"Bedrock Rodeo Round-Up"	Rance Howard	October 15, 1964	P–120	7.63
When Pebbles seems to love rodeo star Bony Hurdle more than Fred, Fred tries to prove his love to her by entering in The Bedrock Rodeo himself, in disguise. Note: Allan Melvin is the voice of Bony Hurdle.
120	6	"Cinderellastone"	Tony Benedict	October 22, 1964	P–117	7.52
Fred seems to be passed over for a promotion at work when the boss invites every employee to his house party except him. Fred then dreams he is Cinderella and his fairy godmother brings Fred to his boss's party.
121	7	"A Haunted House is Not a Home"	Alan Dinehart & Herbert Finn	October 29, 1964	P–121	7.10
Fred's Uncle Giggles fakes his death and pretends that he has left his fortune to Fred. In order to get the fortune, Fred is required to stay overnight at Giggles' haunted house where it appears that Fred nearly gets killed. Note: A spoof of horror film House on Haunted Hill.
122	8	"Dr. Sinister"	William Idelson & Samuel Bobrick	November 5, 1964	P-122	7.31
Fred and Barney are disappointed that their life is boring after watching a Jay Bondrock movie. Then, when sent to the store, Fred and Barney find themselves captured, flown to a distant island, beaten up, and almost killed by a mad scientist named Dr. Sinister. Note: This episode is a parody of James Bond's Dr. No.
123	9	"The Gruesomes"	Warren Foster	November 12, 1964	P–123	6.94
A weird family named the Gruesomes, whom Fred doesn't like, move in next door to the Flintstones. Notes: First of two appearances by the Gruesomes, who would return in episode 133. Howard Morris, Andrew Sabiston and Naomi Lewis provide the voices of Weirdly, Goblin and Creepella Gruesome. This episode parodied The Munsters and The Addams Family – two popular ghoul comedies of the time.
124	10	"The Most Beautiful Baby in Bedrock"	Joanna Lee	November 19, 1964	P–124	8.31
After seeing a film version of Shakespeare's "Romeo and Juliet," the Flintstones and Rubbles don't believe its premise of two families fighting each other, until Fred enters Pebbles in a baby beauty contest while Barney enters Bamm-Bamm. This only results in Pebbles and Bamm-Bamm to run away when the Flintstones and Rubbles go through a similar quarrel. Note: Both this episode and the next are related to William Shakespeare's Romeo and Juliet. Actor Henry Corden joins the supporting cast "stock company" with this episode. Corden played Fred on some Hanna-Barbera records and was Fred's singing voice in Hanna-Barbera's 1966 feature film The Man Called Flintstone and Hanna-Barbera's 1966 TV special Alice in Wonderland or What's a Nice Kid Like You Doing in a Place Like This?. After the passing of Alan Reed in 1977, Corden became the official voice of Fred.
125	11	"Dino and Juliet"	Tony Benedict	November 26, 1964	P–125	6.94
Fred's new neighbor, Mr. Loudrock, becomes a thorn in his side, but Dino falls in love with Loudrock's pet and has puppies. Note: Mr. Loudrock is voiced by Henry Corden, and offers the opportunity to hear the two first "Fred Flintstones" directly interacting in the same episode. This is the second episode in a row that is a nod to William Shakespeare's Romeo and Juliet.
126	12	"King for a Night"	William Idelson & Samuel Bobrick	December 3, 1964	P–126	7.47
When the King of Stonesylvania visits Bedrock, he decides he wants to be a normal person, and dead-ringer look-alike Fred is hired to fill in for him as king. The plan begins to unravel when the king demonstrates little tolerance for the outside world and Fred does not like being a king much better. When Wilma mistakes the king for Fred, more troubles begin for both the king and Fred. Note: This episode is a reworking of episode 22, "The Tycoon". The gag about Fred learning to say, "The rotskin spotskin is motskin on the plotskin" is a spoof of "The Rain in Spain" from My Fair Lady.
127	13	"Indianrockolis 500"	Rance Howard	December 10, 1964	P–127	7.31
Fred and Barney enter their sports car into the Indianrockolis 500, with Fred adopting the sporting moniker "Goggles Paesano". Note: Alan Reed does a rare second voice as Mr. Slate's associate.
128	14	"Adobe Dick"	Barry E. Blitzer	December 17, 1964	P–128	7.73
On a fishing trip, Fred and Barney are swallowed by a whale named Adobe Dick. Note: A spoof of Herman Melville's Moby-Dick.
129	15	"Christmas Flintstone"	Warren Foster	December 25, 1964	P–131	N/A
Fred becomes Santa for a Macyrock's store, and does such a good job that Santa's elves recruit him to substitute for the real Santa when he becomes ill. Songs: "Christmas is My Favorite Time of Year" and "Dino the Dinosaur" by John McCarthy Note: The series moved from Thursday back to Friday nights on ABC with this episode.
130	16	"Fred's Flying Lesson"	Rick Mittleman	January 1, 1965	P—129	9.36
Fred wins a flying lesson at a lodge contest. He decides to take the lesson and his teacher is a younger woman.
131	17	"Fred's Second Car"	Rance Howard	January 8, 1965	P–130	10.63
Fred buys a gangster's car for almost nothing from a police auction, but his plan goes wrong when Big Sparkle and his men, three gangsters, track the car down and plot to kill Fred and Barney off.
132	18	"Time Machine"	William Idelson & Samuel Bobrick	January 15, 1965	P–133	11.47
The Flintstones and the Rubbles visit the Bedrock World's Fair, where they visit a time machine exhibit and travel to various times of the future: meeting Emperor Nero, Christopher Columbus, King Arthur, and Benjamin Franklin, and going to the 1964-65 World's Fair. Notes: Nero is played by a cartoon version of Jack Benny playing his violin. Officer Dibble from Top Cat (another Hanna-Barbera show) makes a cameo appearance as a police officer of the future.
133	19	"The Hatrocks and the Gruesomes"	Alan Dinehart & Herbert Finn	January 22, 1965	P–132	11.41
The Hatrocks come to visit Bedrock World's Fair and stay with the Flintstones for one night after they declare their feud over, and wind up overstaying their welcome for over a week due to Fred's big mouth. The Flintstones then recruit their neighbors, the Gruesomes, to scare the Hatrocks away by performing "bug music" (a spoof of the Beatles). Note: Second and final appearances of both the Hatrocks and the Gruesomes.
134	20	"Moonlight and Maintenance"	Alan Dinehart & Herbert Finn	January 29, 1965	P–134	11.89
After visiting luxury apartments, Fred decides he wants to live there, so he moves with Wilma and Pebbles. In order to pay for the place, Fred takes a job at the apartment complex moonlighting as a janitor. Fred finds that working two jobs is too hectic, and when Fred's boss, Mr. Slate, moves into Bedrock Towers, he must try to hide from Mr. Slate that he is moonlighting.
135	21	"Sheriff for a Day"	Joanna Lee	February 5, 1965	P–135	11.26
The Flintstones and the Rubbles travel to a small town out west. Fred runs into an old friend who hears that the Slatery Brothers are seeking revenge on the town. In order to defend themselves, he recruits Fred as sheriff. Notes: The Cartwrights, from Bonanza, are caricatured here as the "Cartrocks". This is the only episode to air originally without a laugh track; one current syndicated print has a new laugh track dubbed in. Mel Blanc's impression of Dennis Weaver as Chester on the TV series Gunsmoke ("Mister Flintstonnne") was also his voice for Droop-A-Long in the Ricochet Rabbit cartoons. The character of "Digger Stone" is based on the comical radio undertaker "Digger O'Dell" on the radio program, "The Life of Riley." This episode loosely spoofs the classic film High Noon.
136	22	"Deep in the Heart of Texarock"	Barry E. Blitzer	February 12, 1965	P–136	10.94
Fred visits his Uncle Tex's ranch in Texarock and has to stop a bunch of cow thieves.
137	23	"The Rolls Rock Caper"	Alan Dinehart & Herbert Finn	February 19, 1965	P–138	12.10
Fred and Barney wind up on an adventure and are seen in a TV show called Smile, You're on My Favorite Crime. Note: "Aaron Boulder" is a caricature of Gene Barry's "Amos Burke" from Burke's Law.
138	24	"Superstone"	Barry E. Blitzer	February 26, 1965	P–137	11.52
When the actor who portrays TV's "Superstone" walks off the job, Fred is recruited to fill in and play him, but he is framed by two thugs who knock him unconscious, dress in his costume, and steal the cash box.
139	25	"Fred Meets Hercurock"	Joanna Lee	March 5, 1965	P–139	11.05
Fred is recruited to play Hercurock in a new movie. Note: Mike Road (voice of Race Bannon on Jonny Quest) voices GoGo Ravine, a spoof of flamboyant movie producer Joseph E. Levine, producer of dubbed Hercules films. The script takes jabs at "instant" star-making and low-budget/high return films.
140	26	"Surfin' Fred"	Joanna Lee	March 12, 1965	P–140	10.10
The Flintstones and Rubbles travel to Rock Island beach when there is a big surfing contest judged by singer/actor Jimmy Darrock (special guest star James Darren). Fred and Wilma decide to enter the surfing contest, even though Fred can't surf. Note: Two re-recorded versions of songs from The Fantastic Baggys' 1964 album, "Tell 'Em I'm Surfin'", are featured on the soundtrack ("Wax Up Your Boards" and "Surfin' Craze") by Steve Barri and P.F. Sloan. On Hulu, this episode is listed as the first episode of Season 6.

=== Season 6 (1965–66) ===
No. overall	No. in season	Title	Written by	Original release date	Prod. code	U.S. households (millions)
141	1	"No Biz Like Show Biz"	Joanna Lee	September 17, 1965	P–142	6.62
Fred is tired of so many teen stars on television after a football game is canceled due to a teen program. He then dreams that Pebbles and Bamm-Bamm become singing stars, causing more havoc than Fred can handle. Notes: Talent scout "Eppy Brianstone" (a play on Beatles manager Brian Epstein) is voiced by Bernard Fox. At the time, Hanna-Barbera Records released a 45 single of "Pebbles & Bamm-Bamm's" recording of "Open Up Your Heart (And Let the Sunshine In)", which would go on to replace "Meet the Flintstones" as the show's closing credits for a few episodes this season. Also in this episode is a caricature of Danny Hutton, later a member of Three Dog Night, singing Hanna-Barbera Records' most successful charting pop tune "Roses and Rainbows." Also heard is the label's first pop single, "Dance in the Sand" by Creations IV.
142	2	"The House That Fred Built"	Joanna Lee	September 24, 1965	P–141	8.72
Fred's mother-in-law writes a letter saying that she is staying with her favorite son-in-law and his wife, and would be coming to see them next week. Fred then attempts to fix up an old house for his mother-in-law and move it into his backyard.
143	3	"The Return of Stony Curtis"	Harvey Bullock & R.S. Allen	October 1, 1965	P–144	8.29
Wilma wins a contest to have Stony Curtis (special guest star Tony Curtis) come over for a day to be her slave.
144	4	"Disorder in the Court"	Alan Dinehart & Herbert Finn	October 8, 1965	P–143	7.96
Fred and Barney are on jury duty and the jury convicts "The Mangler" of robbery. After his conviction, The Mangler vows to get even with the foreman of the jury, Fred. The convict escapes from prison the very next day and Fred fears that The Mangler is going to get him.
145	5	"Circus Business"	Herbert Finn & Alan Dinehart	October 15, 1965	P–146	7.85
The Flintstones and Rubbles visit a carnival, and Fred decides to buy the carnival unaware of the problems it has.
146	6	"Samantha"	Harvey Bullock & R.S. Allen	October 22, 1965	P–148	8.61
Elizabeth Montgomery and Dick York guest-star as new neighbors, Samantha and Darrin (from Bewitched), who move next door to the Flintstones. Fred and Barney take a camping trip without Wilma and Betty. Samantha then decides to help Wilma and Betty follow the husbands to the woods. Note: Hanna-Barbera animated the opening titles for Bewitched.
147	7	"The Great Gazoo"	Joanna Lee	October 29, 1965	P–145	7.91
Wilma and Betty want to go out to eat at a very expensive restaurant, while Fred and Barney claim they cannot afford it. Soon after, Fred and Barney find a space alien (voiced by Harvey Korman) who has crash-landed on Earth, who says that he will help them until he is able to go back to his home planet. Gazoo promises to give Fred and Barney some money for the dinner date to that expensive restaurant, but when the bill arrives, Gazoo is nowhere to be found, leaving Fred and Barney to wash the dishes at the restaurant.
148	8	"Rip Van Flintstone"	Tony Benedict	November 5, 1965	P–147	9.74
Fred is dragged to a company picnic after a skatebone incident at a supermarket where he is very bored and annoyed, alienating his friends and coworkers. He falls asleep and dreams he wakes up 20 years later where the picnic area is empty and dilapidated, his friends are long gone and the town of Bedrock is now a big city, and Barney is a millionaire, Pebbles married Bamm Bamm, and Wilma lives on Barney's estate. Fred is upset that he has slept his life away before he actually awakens near the picnic and learns that he really only slept for about an hour. Reborn, Fred returns to the picnic, happily joining in on all of the events. Note: This episode was inspired by the story Rip Van Winkle by Washington Irving.
149	9	"The Gravelberry Pie King"	Herbert Finn & Alan Dinehart	November 12, 1965	P–149	9.09
After Gazoo gets Fred to see his boss for a list of demands from him and his co-workers, Mr. Slate fires Fred to meet the demands of the other workers. Fred then hangs out at the park and meets an unemployed man who thinks the pie Wilma made is the best pie he's ever had. Other people taste it, including P.J. Safestone of Safestone Supermarkets (which is the parody of Safeway Supermarkets). Safestone makes a deal with Fred to bake 50 pies, then 500 pies but later Fred discovers that the pies are causing him to lose money making them. When Fred tries to make a better deal, Safestone refuses and Fred is stuck with 500 unsold pies.
150	10	"The Stonefinger Caper"	Joanna Lee	November 19, 1965	P–150	9.25
Gazoo gives Fred a luxury car and this causes more problems, including some mysterious people trying to get a secret formula from Barney, who they think is scientist Dr. Rockenheimer. After Fred makes the mistake of telling Gazoo to get lost, the mysterious people finally knock Fred and Barney out, and are ready to kill them to get a formula Barney does not have. Note: The Flintstones and Rubbles watch From Crusher with Love, a play on the 1963 James Bond film From Russia with Love, which is similar to a subplot in the 1966 feature film The Man Called Flintstone, in which Fred must meet a beautiful woman believed to be defecting from her former leader.
151	11	"The Masquerade Party"	Warren Foster	November 26, 1965	P–151	8.02
Fred and Barney enter an upcoming costume contest at the Water Buffalo Lodge both dressed as devils and their fighting attracts the attention of the police. Meanwhile, a new band called the Way-Outs puts on a radio broadcasts saying the town is being invaded by the "Way-Outs" where its radio announcer causes people to mistakenly believe that Bedrock is invaded by space aliens. After deciding to let Barney be the devil, Fred decides to dress as a space alien and is mistaken for one of the Way-Outs. After some scuffles, everything is cleared up when the radio DJ under the intimidation of the police who received a lot of complaints comes clean about the Way-Outs. Fred manages to win the contest and even performs with the Way-Outs.
152	12	"Shinrock-a-Go-Go"	Barry E. Blitzer	December 3, 1965	P–152	9.47
Fred is entered in a teen dance contest against his will on the Shinrock show (a parody of ABC's pop music program, Shindig!), hosted by Jimmy O'Neillstone (special guest star Jimmy O'Neill, the host of Shindig!) where every one of Fred's mishaps becomes a new dance. Note: The Beau Brummels also guest-star as "The Beau Brummelstones", singing the Beau Brummels' 1965 hit, "Laugh, Laugh".
153	13	"Royal Rubble"	Tony Benedict	December 10, 1965	P–153	9.09
It is believed by a royal tribe that Barney is their king due to his resemblance to the real king. Barney goes along with this and fills in as their king. Note: This was the first episode in which Pebbles and Bamm-Bamm's version of "Open Up Your Heart" was used as the closing credits. The other episode that uses this ending is "Seeing Doubles". The singing voices are provided by Jessica Brown and Dominic Whitaker.
154	14	"Seeing Doubles"	Herbert Finn & Alan Dinehart	December 17, 1965	P–154	6.89
Fred and Barney have a bowling game on Friday night, the night that they are to take Wilma and Betty out to dinner. After failing to convince the wives to let them go bowling, hilarity ensues when Gazoo makes two doubles that look like Fred and Barney to take the wives out while they go bowling. Note: This episode is one of two written by George O'Hanlon, the voice of George Jetson from The Jetsons. Fred's mention of "Bill and Joe's Beanery" is a nod to Bill Hanna and Joe Barbera.
155	15	"How to Pick a Fight with Your Wife Without Really Trying"	Herbert Finn & Alan Dinehart	January 7, 1966	P-155	9.95
Gazoo convinces Fred to do a Monopoly game with Wilma to spice up their relationship for "togetherness" in their marriage, but things make a turn for the worse when they begin to fight, and Fred decides to stay with Barney and Wilma stays with Betty until they can make up.
156	16	"Fred Goes Ape"	Barry E. Blitzer	January 14, 1966	P–157	9.25
When Fred's allergies become so extreme that he sneezes a hole in the TV screen, Fred decides to take medicine pills called "Scram" from a store that have the disastrous side effect of turning him into an ape.
157	17	"The Long, Long, Long Weekend"	Herbert Finn & Alan Dinehart	January 21, 1966	P–158	7.96
After Fred criticizes a magazine about the future that Barney is reading, The Great Gazoo sends Fred, Barney, Betty, and Wilma into the 21st century. Notes: The setting for the future is from The Jetsons series, and the music score from The Jetsons is used. The title is a spoof of season 1 episode title "The Long, Long Weekend".
158	18	"Two Men on a Dinosaur"	Walter Black	February 4, 1966	P–156	9.47
The Great Gazoo uses Fred's television to contact his home planet about returning there and is told "Are you kidding?" In order to show that he is worthy of returning home, Gazoo decides to teach gamblers Fred and Barney a lesson by magically fixing the results of a dinosaur race at the race track. Fred and Barney wind up in big trouble after some gangsters spot them picking winners.
159	19	"The Treasure of Sierra Madrock"	Joanna Lee	February 11, 1966	P–159	9.85
Finding "treasure" on the way home from Rock Vegas tests Fred and Barney's friendship. Note: A spoof of The Treasure of the Sierra Madre.
160	20	"Curtain Call at Bedrock"	George O'Hanlon	February 18, 1966	P–160	10.11
Fred, Wilma, Barney and Betty put on the play "Romeorock & Julietstone". Note: This episode is the second and last episode written by George O'Hanlon, the voice of George Jetson from The Jetsons.
161	21	"Boss for a Day"	Herbert Finn & Alan Dinehart	February 25, 1966	P–161	9.95
After complaining about having to work so hard on his job and constantly being scolded by Mr. Slate, Fred is magically made the boss for a day by Gazoo, and Fred quickly discovers being the boss is not all it's cracked up to be when he learns that Mr. Slate answers to the chairman of the board of directors.
162	22	"Fred's Island"	Barry E. Blitzer	March 4, 1966	P–162	9.58
After Fred is conned into painting Mr. Slate's huge yacht, the boat drifts away from the dock and they drift to what Fred believes is an unexplored island.
163	23	"Jealousy"	Harvey Bullock & R.S. Allen	March 11, 1966	P–163	9.68
Wilma's handsome childhood friend comes to town, making Fred very jealous. Note: Betty, Pebbles, Bamm-Bamm and Dino are absent in this episode.
164	24	"Dripper"	Barry E. Blitzer	March 18, 1966	P–164	9.31
Dripper the seal (a satire on Flipper) follows the Flintstones home while Dripper's trainer is attempting to kidnap his pet.
165	25	"My Fair Freddy"	Tony Benedict	March 25, 1966	P–166	8.82
Fred and Wilma get accepted into a Country Club with rich socialites, based on a conversation Wilma was having about their pet Dino, causing Fred to try to learn manners in order to fit in. Note: Because The Great Gazoo finally does "something worthwhile" for Fred, he is able to leave Bedrock and head back to his home planet; this episode is his last appearance.
166	26	"The Story of Rocky's Raiders"	Joanna Lee	April 1, 1966	P–165	8.98
Fred's grandfather comes for a visit. While awaiting his arrival, Fred finds Grandpa Flintstone's diary, which recalls his army days as the head of "Rocky's Raiders" in Stone World War I. Note: In a portrayal of the diary story, Fred, Wilma, Barney and Betty portray other characters; Betty speaks French with a French accent and Wilma speaks Russian with a Russian accent.

== Home Media ==
=== DVD releases ===
Animated Series – Seasons Sets

The Flintstones: The Complete First Season
Set details		Special features
Studio: Warner Bros.; Episodes: 28; Aspect Ratio: 1.33:1; Audio: English, French & Spanish (Dolby Digital Mono); Subtitles: English, French, Spanish (R1)		"All About The Flintstones" featurette; "Wacky Inventions" featurette; Early TV promo spots; The original pilot episode "The Flagstones"
Release dates		"All About The Flintstones" featurette; "Wacky Inventions" featurette; Early TV promo spots; The original pilot episode "The Flagstones"
(United States) (Canada) North America	March 16, 2004	"All About The Flintstones" featurette; "Wacky Inventions" featurette; Early TV promo spots; The original pilot episode "The Flagstones"
United Kingdom	November 7, 2005	"All About The Flintstones" featurette; "Wacky Inventions" featurette; Early TV promo spots; The original pilot episode "The Flagstones"
Australia	March 2, 2005	"All About The Flintstones" featurette; "Wacky Inventions" featurette; Early TV promo spots; The original pilot episode "The Flagstones"

The Flintstones: The Complete Second Season
Set details		Special features
Studio: Warner Bros.; Episodes: 32; Aspect Ratio: 1.33:1; Audio: English, French & Spanish (Dolby Digital Mono); Subtitles: English, French, Spanish (R1)		Audio commentary on "The Hit Songwriter", "The Beauty Contest", and "The Happy Household" by Jerry Eisenberg (Layout Artist), Earl Kress (Writer/ Animation Historian) and Scott Shaw (Cartoonist/ Hanna-Barbera Historian).; Carved in Stone: The Flintstones Phenomenon; Music Video: Songs of the Flintstones Album; Production Sketches: How to Draw Fred Flintstone; Flintstone Art: Explore rare original pencil drawings; TV Spot: And Now A Word from Our Sponsor featurette
Release dates		Audio commentary on "The Hit Songwriter", "The Beauty Contest", and "The Happy Household" by Jerry Eisenberg (Layout Artist), Earl Kress (Writer/ Animation Historian) and Scott Shaw (Cartoonist/ Hanna-Barbera Historian).; Carved in Stone: The Flintstones Phenomenon; Music Video: Songs of the Flintstones Album; Production Sketches: How to Draw Fred Flintstone; Flintstone Art: Explore rare original pencil drawings; TV Spot: And Now A Word from Our Sponsor featurette
(United States) (Canada) North America	December 7, 2004	Audio commentary on "The Hit Songwriter", "The Beauty Contest", and "The Happy Household" by Jerry Eisenberg (Layout Artist), Earl Kress (Writer/ Animation Historian) and Scott Shaw (Cartoonist/ Hanna-Barbera Historian).; Carved in Stone: The Flintstones Phenomenon; Music Video: Songs of the Flintstones Album; Production Sketches: How to Draw Fred Flintstone; Flintstone Art: Explore rare original pencil drawings; TV Spot: And Now A Word from Our Sponsor featurette
United Kingdom	January 1, 2007	Audio commentary on "The Hit Songwriter", "The Beauty Contest", and "The Happy Household" by Jerry Eisenberg (Layout Artist), Earl Kress (Writer/ Animation Historian) and Scott Shaw (Cartoonist/ Hanna-Barbera Historian).; Carved in Stone: The Flintstones Phenomenon; Music Video: Songs of the Flintstones Album; Production Sketches: How to Draw Fred Flintstone; Flintstone Art: Explore rare original pencil drawings; TV Spot: And Now A Word from Our Sponsor featurette
Australia	July 12, 2005	Audio commentary on "The Hit Songwriter", "The Beauty Contest", and "The Happy Household" by Jerry Eisenberg (Layout Artist), Earl Kress (Writer/ Animation Historian) and Scott Shaw (Cartoonist/ Hanna-Barbera Historian).; Carved in Stone: The Flintstones Phenomenon; Music Video: Songs of the Flintstones Album; Production Sketches: How to Draw Fred Flintstone; Flintstone Art: Explore rare original pencil drawings; TV Spot: And Now A Word from Our Sponsor featurette

The Flintstones: The Complete Third Season
Set details		Special features
Studio: Warner Bros.; Episodes: 28; Aspect Ratio: 1.33:1; Audio: English, French & Spanish (Dolby Digital Mono); Subtitles: English, French, Spanish (R1)		Bedrock Collectibles; First Families of The Stone Age; Bonus collectible animation cel packaged with the DVD set.
Release dates		Bedrock Collectibles; First Families of The Stone Age; Bonus collectible animation cel packaged with the DVD set.
(United States) (Canada) North America	March 22, 2005	Bedrock Collectibles; First Families of The Stone Age; Bonus collectible animation cel packaged with the DVD set.
United Kingdom	September 5, 2005	Bedrock Collectibles; First Families of The Stone Age; Bonus collectible animation cel packaged with the DVD set.
Australia	October 19, 2005	Bedrock Collectibles; First Families of The Stone Age; Bonus collectible animation cel packaged with the DVD set.

The Flintstones: The Complete Fourth Season
Set details		Special features
Studio: Warner Bros.; Episodes: 26; Aspect Ratio: 1.33:1; Audio: English (Dolby Digital Mono); Subtitles: English, French, Spanish		Audio Commentary: Historians and Animation Writers discuss Flintstones history in commentaries on "Ann Margrock Presents" and "Little Bamm-Bamm".; The Legendary Music of Hoyt Curtin: Discover the man who wrote the famous theme song, Hoyt Curtin.; The Flintstones: Featurette on how The Flintstones was the first animated show to appear in a prime time slot.; Bonus collectible animation cel packaged with the DVD set.
Release date		Audio Commentary: Historians and Animation Writers discuss Flintstones history in commentaries on "Ann Margrock Presents" and "Little Bamm-Bamm".; The Legendary Music of Hoyt Curtin: Discover the man who wrote the famous theme song, Hoyt Curtin.; The Flintstones: Featurette on how The Flintstones was the first animated show to appear in a prime time slot.; Bonus collectible animation cel packaged with the DVD set.
(United States) (Canada) North America	November 15, 2005	Audio Commentary: Historians and Animation Writers discuss Flintstones history in commentaries on "Ann Margrock Presents" and "Little Bamm-Bamm".; The Legendary Music of Hoyt Curtin: Discover the man who wrote the famous theme song, Hoyt Curtin.; The Flintstones: Featurette on how The Flintstones was the first animated show to appear in a prime time slot.; Bonus collectible animation cel packaged with the DVD set.

The Flintstones: The Complete Fifth Season
Set details		Special features
Studio: Warner Bros.; Episodes: 26; Aspect Ratio: 1.33:1; Audio: English & French (Dolby Digital Mono); Subtitles: English, French, Spanish		Two original commercials and an interview bite with Joe Barbara and William Hanna about the creation of the Flintstones series, with introduction by a historian of animation, Earl Kress.; A Stone Age Parenting Guide: Humorous look at child rearing in the stone age.; Stone By Stone: Original production storyboards of a classic episode "The Gruesomes" running alongside the actual finished episode to learn how it all came together.
Release date		Two original commercials and an interview bite with Joe Barbara and William Hanna about the creation of the Flintstones series, with introduction by a historian of animation, Earl Kress.; A Stone Age Parenting Guide: Humorous look at child rearing in the stone age.; Stone By Stone: Original production storyboards of a classic episode "The Gruesomes" running alongside the actual finished episode to learn how it all came together.
(United States) (Canada) North America	March 7, 2006	Two original commercials and an interview bite with Joe Barbara and William Hanna about the creation of the Flintstones series, with introduction by a historian of animation, Earl Kress.; A Stone Age Parenting Guide: Humorous look at child rearing in the stone age.; Stone By Stone: Original production storyboards of a classic episode "The Gruesomes" running alongside the actual finished episode to learn how it all came together.

The Flintstones: The Complete Sixth Season
Set details		Special features
Studio: Warner Bros.; Episodes: 26; Aspect Ratio: 1.33:1; Audio: English, French & Spanish (Dolby Digital Mono); Subtitles: English French Spanish		The Flintstones Meet Pop Culture: Stephen Baldwin hosts a look at the effect of pop culture on the show, and vice versa; The Great Gazoo: From A to Zetox
Release date		The Flintstones Meet Pop Culture: Stephen Baldwin hosts a look at the effect of pop culture on the show, and vice versa; The Great Gazoo: From A to Zetox
(United States) (Canada) North America	September 5, 2006	The Flintstones Meet Pop Culture: Stephen Baldwin hosts a look at the effect of pop culture on the show, and vice versa; The Great Gazoo: From A to Zetox

The Flintstones: The Complete Series
Set details		Special features
Studio: Warner Bros.; Episodes: 166; Aspect Ratio: 1.33:1; Audio: English, French & Spanish (Dolby Digital Mono); Subtitles: English, French, Spanish		Limited edition, collectors box features all 6 seasons with over 4.5 hrs of bonus features; This boxset was only released in the US, it is available in Canada as an import. You can also get it in Australia, through Atomic Movies plus, seasons 4, 5 & 6 by import.
Release date		Limited edition, collectors box features all 6 seasons with over 4.5 hrs of bonus features; This boxset was only released in the US, it is available in Canada as an import. You can also get it in Australia, through Atomic Movies plus, seasons 4, 5 & 6 by import.
(United States) (Canada) North America	October 28, 2008	Limited edition, collectors box features all 6 seasons with over 4.5 hrs of bonus features; This boxset was only released in the US, it is available in Canada as an import. You can also get it in Australia, through Atomic Movies plus, seasons 4, 5 & 6 by import.

=== Blu-Ray Release ===
- The Flintstones: The Complete Series (1960–66): Released October 27, 2020 in identical sets in the US and France Episode 17 on disc one, "The Big Bank Robbery", was missing music and sound effects, and Warner issued a corrected disc.
