= John Stephenson (actor) =

American actor (1923–2015)

- Born: John Winfield Stephenson c. 1923/1924; Kenosha, Wisconsin, U.S.
- Died: May 15, 2015 (aged 91–92); Los Angeles, California, U.S.
- Other name: John Stevenson
- Occupations: Actor, voice actor
- Years active: 1946–2010
- Spouse: Jean Elaine Irwin (m. 1955)
- Children: 2

John Winfield Stephenson (born c. 1923/1924 – May 15, 2015) was an American actor who worked primarily in voice-over roles.

== Early life ==
Stephenson was from Kenosha, Wisconsin. After serving in the United States Army Air Forces as a gunner and radio operator during World War II, Stephenson took a course in speech and drama at Northwestern University and graduated with a theatre degree before moving to Hollywood.

== Death ==
Stephenson died of Alzheimer's disease, aged 91 on May 15, 2015. He is survived by his wife of 60 years, their two children (a son and a daughter) and a granddaughter.

== Filmography ==
=== Film ===
- Spartacus – Centurion (uncredited) (1960)
- The Man Called Flintstone – Vet (1966)
- Hellfighters – Mr. Chapman (uncredited) (1968)
- Charlotte's Web – John Arable (1973)
- Herbie Rides Again – Lawyer-Second Team (1974)
- The Last of the Mohicans – TV Movie – Colonel Allen Munro, Delaware Chief (1975)
- The Hobbit – TV Movie – Dori, Bard, Great Goblin (1977)
- Five Weeks in a Balloon – TV movie (1977)
- Yogi's First Christmas – TV Movie – Doggie Daddy, Mr. Dingwell (1980)
- The Return of the King – TV Movie – Gondorian Guard, Dwimmerlaik – The Witch-King of Angmar (1980)
- No Man's Valley – TV Special – Herman, Protester (1981)
- Yogi Bear's All Star Comedy Christmas Caper – TV Special – Doggie Daddy, Butler, Announcer (1982)
- The Jetsons Meet the Flintstones – TV Movie – Mr. Slate (1987)
- Top Cat and the Beverly Hills Cats -TV Movie – Fancy-Fancy, Officer Charlie Dibble, Waiter (1987)
- Yogi Bear and the Magical Flight of the Spruce Goose – TV Movie – Doggie Daddy, Pelican (1987)
- Little Nemo: Adventures in Slumberland – The Dirigible Captain, Oompo (1989)
- Hanna-Barbera's 50th: A Yabba Dabba Doo Celebration – TV Movie documentary – Mr. Slate (1989)
- A Flintstone Family Christmas – TV Special – Mr. Slate (1993)
- Hollyrock-a-Bye Baby – TV Movie – Mr. Slate (1993)
- I Yabba-Dabba Do! – TV Movie – Mr. Slate (1993)
- A Flintstones Christmas Carol – TV Movie – Mr. Slate (1994)
- Truman – TV Movie – H.V. Kaltenborn (voice) (uncredited) (1995)
- The Flintstones in Viva Rock Vegas – Showroom Announcer, Minister (voice) (2000)
- The Flintstones: On the Rocks – TV Movie – Mr. Slate, Old Man (2001)
- Scooby-Doo! Abracadabra-Doo – Video – The Sheriff (2010)

=== Television ===
- The Lone Ranger – episode – Dan Reid's Fight for Life – Roy Barnett (1954)
- Treasury Men in Action – 5 episodes (1955)
- The People's Choice (1955) 16 episodes Roger Crutcher
- Yancy Derringer – episode – Three Knaves from New Haven – Arthur Travers (1958)
- The Real McCoys – 3 episodes – various (1958–1963)
- Bonanza – episode – The Sisters – John Henry (1959)
- Shotgun Slade – episode – The Smell of Money – Charlie Cummings (1960)
- The Flintstones – 73 episodes – Mr. Slate, Grand Poobah, Joe, Additional voices (1960–1966)
- Whispering Smith – episode – The Idol – Eddie Royce (1961)
- Top Cat – episodes – Fancy-Fancy, The Sergeant (1961–1962)
- Jonny Quest – 6 episodes – Dr. Benton C. Quest (first 4 episodes, additional voices (1964–1965)
- The Peter Potamus Show (14 episodes of it) & The Magilla Gorilla Show (9 episodes of it) – Segment – Breezly and Sneezly – Colonel Fuzzby (1964–1965)
- Gomer Pyle, U.S.M.C. – 2 episodes – They Shall Not Pass & Sue the Pants Off 'Em – Major Stone Mr. Clark (1964–1967)
- The Man from U.N.C.L.E. – episode – The Never-Never Affair – Varner (1965)
- Hogan's Heroes – 8 episodes – Professor Bauer, Felix, Decker, Major Rudel, Karl, Inspector General, Major Kohler, Captain Mueller (1965-1970)
- The Atom Ant Show – Segment – Atom Ant – Narrator (uncredited) (1965–1966)
- Frankenstein Jr. and The Impossibles – Professor Conroy, Additional voices (1966)
- The Secret Squirrel Show – 26 episodes – Segment – Squiddly Diddly/Winsome Witch – Chief Winchley, Additional voices (1966-1967)
- The Abbott and Costello Cartoon Show – additional voices (1967)
- Iron Horse – episode – Decision at Sundown – Warden (1967)
- Birdman – Various (1967)
- Samson & Goliath – additional voices (1967–1968)
- Dragnet – Narrator (uncredited) (1967–1969)
- Moby Dick and Mighty Mightor – Pond, Ork, Tog, Additional voices (1967–1969)
- The Banana Splits – episode – Fariik, Bakaar ("Arabian Knights" segment) (1968)
- The Adventures of Gulliver – Captain Leech (1968)
- Wacky Races – 17 episodes – Luke, Blubber Bear (1968–1969)
- The Mod Squad – episode – The Girl in Chair Nine – Professor Aaron Tanner (1969)
- Scooby-Doo, Where Are You! – Dr. Jekyll/Ghost of Mr. Hyde, Sheriff, additional voices (1969–1970)
- Help!... It's the Hair Bear Bunch! – 16 episodes – Eustace P. Peevly, The Zoo Superintendent, Slicks the Fox, Hippy the Hippopotamus, Dr. Kneeknocker, Zeed the Zebra, Additional voices (1971)
- The Flintstone Comedy Hour – Noodles (1972)
- Sealab 2020 – Captain Mike Murphy (1972)
- A Christmas Story – TV Movie (1972)
- The Thanksgiving That Almost Wasn't – TV movie (1972)
- Mission: Impossible – episode – Underground – Director (1972)
- Yogi's Ark Lark – Benny the Ball, Doggie Daddy, Hardy Har Har (1972)
- Wait Till Your Father Gets Home (1972–1973)
- The New Scooby-Doo Movies – Additional Voices (1972-1974)
- Jeannie – 16 episodes – Great Hadji (1973)
- Super Friends (1973)
- Yogi's Gang – Doggie Daddy, Hardy Har Har, Additional Voices (1973)
- Inch High, Private Eye – 13 episodes – Mr. Finkerton (1973)
- Goober and the Ghost Chasers – Additional voices (1973)
- Speed Buggy – Additional voices (1973)
- The Addams Family – Cousin Itt, additional voices (1973)
- McMillan & Wife – episode – The Fine Art of Staying Alive – Harry (1973)
- Butch Cassidy – Mr. Socrates (1973)
- The Six Million Dollar Man – episode – Nuclear Alert – Two Star General (uncredited) (1974)
- Devlin – Additional voices (1974)
- These Are the Days – Additional voices (1974)
- ABC Afterschool Specials – episode – Cyrano – Richelieu (1974)
- Partridge Family 2200 A.D. – Reuben Kinkaid (1974–1975)
- The Streets of San Francisco – episode – The Programming of Charlie Blake – Leonard Paxton (1975)
- The Tom & Jerry Show – Tom, Jerry, Spike – additional voices (1975)
- The Mumbly Cartoon Show – Shnooker (1976)
- Davy Crockett on the Mississippi – TV Movie – Sloan, Andrew Jackson, Blacksmith (1976)
- Clue Club – Sheriff Bagley (1976)
- The Scooby-Doo/Dynomutt Hour – Additional voices (1976–1978)
- A Flintstone Christmas – TV Special – Mr. Slate (1977)
- Laff-A-Lympics – Mildew Wolf, Doggie Daddy, Dread Baron, The Great Fondue, Additional voices (1977–1979)
- CB Bears – additional voices (1977)
- Captain Caveman and the Teen Angels – additional voices (1977–1980)
- Galaxy Goof-Ups – Captain Snerdley, General Blowhard (1978)
- The All New Popeye Hour – Mr. No No, Additional voices (1978)
- The Flintstones: Little Big League – TV Movie – Mr. Slate (1978)
- The New Fantastic Four – Doctor Doom, Professor Gregson Gilbert, Magneto, Additional voices (1978)
- Casper's First Christmas – Doggie Daddy, Hairy Scary (1979)
- The Super Globetrotters (1979)
- Gulliver's Travels – TV Movie (1979)
- Fred and Barney Meet the Thing – Segment – The Thing – Dr. Harkness (1979)
- Scooby-Doo and Scrappy-Doo – Additional voices (1979)
- The New Fred and Barney Show – Mr. Slate (1979)
- The Flintstones Meet Rockula and Frankenstone – TV special – Count Rockula (1979)
- The Plastic Man Comedy/Adventure Show – Mayor ("Mighty Man and Yukk" segment), Additional voices (1979)
- The Flintstone Comedy Show – Mr. Slate (1980)
- The Flintstones: Fred's Final Fling – TV Special – Frank Frankenstone, Dinosaur, Monkey #1 (1980)
- The Flintstones' New Neighbors – TV Special – Frank Frankenstone (1980)
- The Kwicky Koala Show – Segment – Kwicky Koala – Wilford Wolf (1981)
- Daniel Boone – TV Movie (1981)
- The Flintstones: Jogging Fever – TV Special – Frank Frankenstone, Mr. Slate (1981)
- The Flintstones: Wind-Up Wilma – TV Special – Frank Frankenstone (1981)
- Space Stars (1981) – Additional voices
- Spider-Man and His Amazing Friends – Colossus, Thunderbird, Shocker, Loki, Modred the Mystic, Ymir, Additional voices (1981–1983)
- The Incredible Hulk (1982)
- Jokebook (1982)
- Laverne & Shirley with Special Guest Star the Fonz – Additional voices (1982)
- Shirt Tales – additional voices (1982)
- G.I. Joe: A Real American Hero – mini series – General Flagg, Old Man (1983)
- The New Scooby and Scrappy-Doo Show – Additional voices (1983)
- The Dukes – Additional voices (1983)
- Mister T – Additional voices (1983)
- The Transformers – Thundercracker, Windcharger, Kup, Huffer, Alpha Trion Additional voices (1984–1987)
- G.I. Joe – Scientist, General Franks, MacIntosh, Mr. Queeg, Additional voices (1985-1986)
- Yogi's Treasure Hunt – Doggie Daddy (1985–1988)
- The Berenstain Bears Show – Additional Male Voices (1985-1987)
- The 13 Ghosts of Scooby-Doo – Boris Kreepoff / Freddie Cadaver (1985)
- The Jetsons – Commissioner/DWMR Officer (1985–1987)
- G.I. Joe – episode – The Spy Who Rooked Me – General Hawk (1986)
- Centurions – Additional voices (1986)
- Galaxy High School – Beef Bonk, Harvey Blastermeier (1986)
- The Flintstone Kids – Ditto Master, Mr. Gemstone (1986–1987)
- Bionic Six – Bionic-1, Jack Bennett, Klunk, Additional voices (1987)
- Fraggle Rock – Doc, Philo, Grunge, Additional voices (1987)
- The Video Adventures of Clifford the Big Red Dog – additional voices (1988)
- Superman – Additional voices (1988)
- Jem – Lord Trevor and creditor (Britrock) (1988)
- X-Men: Pryde of the X-Men – TV Short – Professor X (1989)
- TaleSpin – Additional voices (1990)
- Wake, Rattle, and Roll – Segment – Fender Bender 500 – Doggie Daddy (1990)
- Yo Yogi! – Doggie Daddy, Mr. Myopics (1991)
- Darkwing Duck – episode – Heavy Mental – Major Synapse (1991)
- Space Cats – Additional voices (1991)
- What's New, Scooby-Doo? – episode – The Unnatural – Bob Taylor (2003)
- Duck Dodgers – episode – The Green Loontern – Ganthet (2003)
- Johnny Bravo – episode – Wilderness Protection Program/A Page Right Out of History – Mr. Slate (2004)
- What's New, Scooby-Doo? – episode – Uncle Scooby and Antarctica – Zelig (2004)

=== Other works ===
- The Flintstones: Wacky Inventions – Video short – Mr. Slate (1994)
- Wacky Races – Video Game – Luke (2000)
- Flintstones Bedrock Bowling – Video Game – Mr. Slate (2000)
- Space Age Gadgets – Video Short – Jetsons Season 1 (2004)
