= A Christmas Story (1972 TV film) =

- Written by: Ken Spears; Joe Ruby
- Directed by: Joseph Barbera; William Hanna
- Voices of: Daws Butler; Paul Winchell; Walter Tetley; Janet Waldo
- Music by: Hoyt Curtin
- Country of origin: United States
- Original language: English

Production
- Producers: Joseph Barbera; William Hanna
- Running time: 30 minutes
- Production company: Hanna-Barbera Productions

Original release
- Network: Syndication
- Release: December 9, 1972

A Christmas Story is a 1972 American animated Christmas television special produced by Hanna-Barbera Productions which was broadcast in syndication on December 9, 1972.

== Summary ==
As a family gathers around the tree on Christmas Eve, their son Timmy has made a special wish in his letter to Santa Claus. But the letter is found – unmailed – by the lovable family dog Goober and his friend, Gumdrop the mouse. Together, they set off into the snowy night to deliver the letter to Santa. Overcoming many perils – including a lurking gang of alley cats – they finally find Santa. Timmy's letter is delivered, Gumdrop and Goober make it home safely and a boy's special wish magically comes true on Christmas.

== Featured songs ==
The songs featured in A Christmas Story included:

- "Sounds of Christmas Day"
- "O Come, All Ye Faithful"
- "Where Do You Look for Santa?"
- "Hope"
- "Which One is the Real Santa Claus?"

"Which One is the Real Santa Claus?", "Sounds of Christmas Day" and "Hope" were re-used five years later in the 1977 TV special A Flintstone Christmas. "Hope" was also re-used in Yogi's First Christmas (1980). "Sounds of Christmas Day" was the melody for "Friends in My TV," the theme of the Kings Island attraction, Enchanted Voyage, in the Happy Land of Hanna-Barbera, which opened the same year.

== Voices ==
- Daws Butler – Gumdrop, Second Dog
- Paul Winchell – Goober, Sleezer, Runto
- Walter Tetley – Timmy, Boy
- Janet Waldo – Timmy's Mother, Girl
- Don Messick – Timmy's Father, Squirrel
- John Stephenson – Polecat, Postman, First Dog
- Hal Smith – Santa Claus, Fatcat

== Home media ==
It was released by AVCO Broadcasting Corp. in the early 1970’s for use with Cartrivision. Cartrivision item number 10264S-NN.

The special was first released on VHS as part of the Hanna-Barbera Super Stars video collection by Hanna-Barbera Home Video on November 9, 1989, and re-released again on September 26, 1995 by Turner Home Entertainment.

On July 31, 2012, Warner Home Video released Hanna-Barbera Christmas Classics Collection on DVD in region 1 via their Warner Archive Collection burn on demand service. This collection features a trilogy of Christmas specials: A Christmas Story, The Town Santa Forgot and Casper's First Christmas.

== See also ==
- List of Christmas films
- List of works produced by Hanna-Barbera Productions
- List of United States Christmas television specials
