= The Flintstone Kids' "Just Say No" Special =

- Written by: Lane Raichert; Laren Bright
- Directed by: Carl Urbano
- Voices of: Scott Menville; Elizabeth Fraser; Hamilton Camp; B.J. Ward; Bumper Robinson; Henry Corden; Jean Vander Pyl
- Composer: Hoyt Curtin
- Country of origin: United States
- Original language: English

Production
- Executive producers: William Hanna; Joseph Barbera
- Producer: Bruce David Johnson
- Editor: Gil Iverson
- Running time: 23 minutes
- Production company: Hanna-Barbera Productions

Original release
- Network: ABC
- Release: September 15, 1988

Related
- The Flintstones' 25th Anniversary Celebration; I Yabba-Dabba Do!

The Flintstone Kids' "Just Say No" Special is a 1988 animated television special featuring The Flintstone Kids and produced by Hanna-Barbera that aired on ABC on September 15, 1988. Nine days later, ABC aired the show again on ABC Weekend Special.

== Summary ==
The Flintstone Kids learn the value of saying no to drugs as they set out to win tickets to the upcoming Michael Jackstone concert. Wilma is tempted to drift away from her usual playmates Freddy, Barney and Betty and join up with a gang of older kids whose leader, Stoney, uses marijuana. However, Wilma resists the peer-pressure tactics of the pre-teen pothead and instead seeks advice from her parents, who tell her that a real friend wouldn't offer her drugs, while her true friends remind her that she doesn't need drugs to be cool. To the tune of LaToya Jackstone's original composition, "Just Say No," Wilma, Freddy and the others establish their own "Just Say No" club.

Next, Freddy starts up a pet cleaning service to raise ticket money for the upcoming Michael Jackstone concert. But Freddy's get-rich-quick scheme falls through due to Stoney tampering with the instructions for each pet. After figuring out what happened, the children realize that their only hope of obtaining tickets is to beat Stoney and his gang at the upcoming Riddle Rally, at which they succeed, with Stoney's gang subsequently abandoning him to join the "Just Say No" club, after which Stoney is arrested for drug usage. The program concludes with a version of Michael Jackson's hit song "Beat It", with the lyrics specially rewritten to convey an anti-drug theme.

This special also features comments from then-First Lady Nancy Reagan, Honorary Chair of the "Just Say No Foundation", who offers a message of support to children who have chosen to live a drug-free life.

== Voice cast ==
- Scott Menville as Freddy Flintstone, Clyde
- Elizabeth Fraser as Wilma Slaghoople
- Hamilton Camp as Barney Rubble
- B.J. Ward as Betty Jean Bricker, Mrs. Gravelstone
- Bumper Robinson as Philo Quartz
- Dana Hill as Stoney
- Jean Vander Pyl as Pearl Pebble-Slaghoople
- Frank Welker as Dino
- Shuko Akune as Dottie
- David Markus as Joey
- René LeVant as Officer Bob Quartz
- Henry Corden as Ed and Edna Flintstone
- Kipp Lennon as Michael Jackstone
- La Toya Jackson as La Toya Jackstone

== Nielsen Ratings ==
The special ranked a distant third in its timeslot with an 8.2 rating and a 14 share, and ranked in the bottom ten network shows for the week (50th out of 59 shows).

== Home media ==
The Flintstone Kids' "Just Say No" Special was released on VHS by World Vision Home Video in 1988. Due to legal music licensing issues with the use of Michael Jackson’s "Beat It", this TV special remains in obscurity.
