= Santa and the Three Bears =

- Original theatrical release poster
- Written by: Tony Benedict
- Directed by: Tony Benedict; Barry Mahon (live-action portions)
- Starring: Hal Smith; Jean Vander Pyl; Christina Ferra-Gilmore; Bobby Riha; Beth Goldfarb; Brian Hobbs
- Music by: Joe Leahy
- Country of origin: United States
- Original language: English

Production
- Producers: Tony Benedict; James Kernodle; Barry Mahon
- Editor: Milton Krear
- Running time: 45 minutes (50 minutes complete with live-action footage)
- Production companies: Tony Benedict Productions; Key Industries, Ltd.

Original release
- Release: November 7, 1970

Santa and the Three Bears is a 1970 animated feature film, which aired in syndication on television regularly during the holiday season.

== Background ==
The film was originally pitched to TV networks, which rejected it as it lacked a villain, but was then shown in theaters instead. This special has been rerun on TBN, USA Network, FOX Family (now Freeform), and on KTLA channel 5 in Los Angeles. It also received a "blue ribbon" award for Best Family Film at the San Francisco International Film Festival.

The live-action sequences, directed by Barry Mahon, at the beginning and end of the film are often edited out in television reruns. The edited version was later released on VHS in 1992 by Kids Klassics, and distributed by GoodTimes Home Video.

== Plot summary ==
Two young bears, Nikomi and Chinook, know nothing of Christmas until the local park ranger tells them about the legend, and they become curious to meet Santa Claus. Their mother, Nana, is preparing for Winter hibernation and cynically tells her children there is no Santa, but they are determined to believe. Mother finds it impossible to begin their sleep, since the young cubs wish to stay awake until Santa arrives.

== Voice cast ==
- Hal Smith as Grandfather, Santa and Mr. Ranger
- Jean Vander Pyl (credited as Jean van der Pyl) as Nana
- Christina Ferra-Gilmore (credited as Annette Ferra) as Nikomi
- Bobby Riha as Chinook
- Joyce Taylor
- Ken Engels
- Beth Goldfarb as Beth
- Brian Hobbs as Brian
- Lenard Keith
- Kathy Lemmon
- Roxanne Poole
- Michael Rodriguez

== Live action segments ==
The theatrical release of the film contains live-action sequences directed by director Barry Mahon, running for around four minutes in total. These sequences feature actor Hal Smith and two young children (Brian Hobbs and Beth Goldfarb) sitting in a cabin and conversing by the fireplace and Christmas tree, and a short montage of mechanical toys, Christmas decorations, and a pet kitten, during the opening and closing credits. The film has been also released by Modern Sound Pictures Inc. with the live-action sequences cut.

== Legacy ==
Bill Hutten and Tony Love, the film's animators, created another Christmas television special in 1983 named The Christmas Tree Train, also starring a bear cub alongside a fox cub and a park ranger, which led to a TV series called Buttons & Rusty.

The film is currently in the public domain in the United States and has seen numerous releases on DVD (mostly the theatrical cut from Super8 film masters) by Genius Entertainment/Classic Media, Mill Creek Entertainment and many other public domain companies.

Mary Jo Pehl and Bridget Nelson of the cult series Mystery Science Theater 3000 spoofed the film on RiffTrax December 22, 2023.

== See also ==
- List of American films of 1970
- List of Christmas films
