= A Flintstones Christmas Carol =

1994 Flintstones Christmas special

- DVD cover
- Based on: A Christmas Carol by Charles Dickens
- Written by: Glenn Leopold
- Directed by: Joanna Romersa
- Voices of: Henry Corden; Jean Vander Pyl; Frank Welker; B.J. Ward; Russi Taylor; Don Messick; John Stephenson; Howard Morris; Will Ryan; Marsha Clark; Joan Gerber
- Music by: Steven Bernstein
- Country of origin: United States
- Original language: English

Production
- Executive producers: William Hanna; Joseph Barbera; Buzz Potamkin
- Running time: 70 minutes
- Production company: Hanna-Barbera Cartoons

Original release
- Network: Syndication
- Release: November 21, 1994

A Flintstones Christmas Carol is a 1994 American animated made-for-television film featuring characters from The Flintstones franchise, and based on the 1843 novella A Christmas Carol by Charles Dickens. Produced by Hanna-Barbera, it features the voices of Henry Corden, Jean Vander Pyl and Frank Welker. It first aired November 21, 1994, in syndication.

== Plot ==
The Bedrock Community Players is mounting A Christmas Carol, and all of the town's citizens are either planning to attend or be involved in the production: Barney Rubble is playing Bob Cragit, with Betty as Mrs. Cragit and his son Bamm-Bamm as Tiny Tim; Mr. Slate is Jacob Marbley; Wilma Flintstone is serving as the stage manager, while her daughter Pebbles plays Martha Cragit; even Dino has a role, playing the Cragit's family pet. It is Fred, though, who has landed the leading role of Ebonezer Scrooge. Unfortunately, he has let his role go to his head, thinking himself a star and spending all of his time rehearsing his lines rather than focusing on his job or family. On Christmas Eve, in his rush to get to work and complete his Christmas shopping, Fred forgets that he must take Pebbles to "cave care", and later to pick her up from cave care. When Fred arrives at the theater, he discovers a furious Wilma, who breaks down in tears as she tells Fred about his mistake.

The play finally begins with narrator Charles Brickens reading the opening lines, and after a momentary bout of stage fright, Fred enters. The play proceeds as normal. As the second act opens, Wilma and Betty discover that Pebbles and Bamm-Bamm's teacher, Miss Feldspar, the woman playing the Ghost of Christmas Past, has contracted the "Bedrock Bug," a flu-like illness. As stage manager, Wilma is left to play the part herself. During the next scene, at Fezziwig's Christmas party, Betty informs Wilma that Maggie has come down with the Bedrock Bug as well; Wilma dons her costume and plays Belle. Fred realizes he forgot the presents and runs to the store. He is approached by the hooded figure of the Ghost of Christmas Yet to Come; revealing himself as the actor Philo Quartz, he drives Fred back to the theater. The second act takes place. The third act begins with the Ghost of Christmas Yet to Come appearing before Scrooge; he shows the elderly man an abandoned gravestone marked with the words "EBONEZER SCROOGE." The scene shifts to Scrooge's bedchamber—he is alive, and he discovers that it is Christmas morning. He recruits a passing boy (played by the same child who Fred entrusted with his presents) to purchase a prize "Turkeysaurus" and have it sent to the Cragits for a feast. Scrooge prepares to go out and explore the city on Christmas morning; along the way, he meets Wilma, who has taken on the role of one of the members of the Piltdown Charitable Foundation, as the original actor has caught the Bedrock Bug. Fred acts as if the woman is Belle (much to narrator Brickens' frustration, as the ad-libbing is not in his script), and begs for both her and Wilma's forgiveness, admitting his recent selfishness and promising that he has changed his attitude. Wilma reluctantly plays along.

The play ends with the narrator informing the audience of the permanent change in the elderly man. Bamm-Bamm forgets his line "God bless us, everyone!", leaving Pebbles to make the declaration herself. When the curtain falls, the company drops Fred and scolds him "for being such a Scrooge." Fred apologizes, informing Wilma that he has finally realized that his friends and family, rather than his role in the production, are what matter most. As the company begins to depart, the Ghost of Christmas Yet to Come takes off his hood, revealing himself as Dino, who took the part after Philo came down with the Bedrock Bug.

A changed Fred says that when the Flintstones get home, he's going to make dinner and invite Wilma's mother. Unfortunately, after he says this, he comes down with the flu, and Wilma decides to make dinner with her mother's help, since the Bedrock Bug "only lasts for a day".

== Voice cast ==
Performer	The Flintstones character(s)	A Christmas Carol character(s)
Henry Corden	Fred Flintstone	Ebonezer Scrooge
Jean Vander Pyl	Wilma Flintstone	Ghost of Christmas Past
Jean Vander Pyl	Wilma Flintstone	Belle
Frank Welker	Barney Rubble	Bob Cragit
Frank Welker	Barney Rubble	Mr. Fezziwig
Frank Welker	Dino	Ghost of Christmas Yet to Come
B.J. Ward	Betty Rubble	Mrs. Cragit
Russi Taylor	Pebbles Flintstone	Martha Cragit
Russi Taylor	Birdy	
Don Messick	Bamm-Bamm Rubble	Tiny Tim
Don Messick	Joe Rockhead	
John Stephenson	Mr. Slate	Jacob Marbley
Marsha Clark	Maggie	Belle (originally cast)
Marsha Clark	Miss Garnet Feldspar	Ghost of Christmas Past (originally cast)
Will Ryan	Ned	Fred
Brian Cummings	Erwin	Ghost of Christmas Present
René LeVant	Philo Quartz	Ghost of Christmas Yet to Come (originally cast)
John Rhys-Davies	Charles Brickens	Charles Dickens

== Production ==
The special came after three Christmas-themed episodes and specials in The Flintstones franchise, namely "Christmas Flintstone" (1964), A Flintstone Christmas (1977) and A Flintstone Family Christmas (1993). It was produced by Hanna-Barbera in Los Angeles, California and directed by Joanna Romersa.

The teleplay was written by Glenn Leopold, based on A Christmas Carol by Charles Dickens. The music was composed by Steve Bernstein. Jean Vander Pyl returned as the voice of Wilma Flintstone, a role she performed since first chosen by Bill Hanna and Joe Barbera to voice the character in 1960. The special was animated by Fil-Cartoons in Manila, Philippines

== Broadcast and release ==
The special premiered in syndication on November 21, 1994. It has been rebroadcast in later years, by Boomerang and Canada's YTV. In recent years, Boomerang's broadcasts of the special have aired as part of Warner Bros. Discovery's All I Watch for Christmas holiday campaign. In 2024, MeTV Toons aired the film as part of the network's "Tis' the Season for Toons" event.

On September 26, 1995, Turner Home Entertainment initially released A Flintstones Christmas Carol on VHS in their Turner Family Showcase collection, debuting 24th among children's video rentals in the United States in October of the same year. Warner Home Video released it on DVD in Region 1 on October 2, 2007. An included bonus was "Christmas Flintstone", an episode from Season 5 of The Flintstones.

== Reception ==
The special received a Film Advisory Board award.

=== Critical response ===
TV Guide gave the special two stars, saying the story within a story is challenged by "the continual cutting away to backstage incidents that turn the careful momentum of Dickens' narrative into jagged stops and starts," adding "how can these prehistoric folk be celebrating the birth of a messiah not due for several millenia? [sic]" Phil Hall, writing for EDGE Boston, similarly called the premise of cavemen celebrating Christmas "decidedly peculiar."

=== Anachronism as recurring theme ===
The Flintstones is set in a fantastical Stone Age, with the town of Bedrock typically depicted as existing around one million years B.C. The franchise's Christmas specials have thus drawn attention for their inherent anachronism—depicting a Christian holiday that commemorates the Nativity of Jesus, an event that would not occur for roughly a million years within the show's timeline. Animation historian Christopher P. Lehman has noted that the series as a whole draws much of its humor from creative anachronism, placing a "modern" 20th-century society in prehistory as a satire of postwar suburban sprawl. The Christmas specials extend this comedic premise to its logical extreme.

In their 2005 book Christmas's Most Wanted, authors Kevin Cuddihy and Phillip Metcalfe ranked the earlier A Flintstone Christmas (1977) seventh among "not-so-classic" Christmas cartoons, remarking on the anachronism of prehistoric times predating the Nativity and thus Christmas itself. The observation has become something of a running gag among fans and critics of the franchise. One popular fan theory attempts to resolve the paradox by suggesting that The Flintstones is actually set in a post-apocalyptic future rather than the prehistoric past—a theory that points to the celebration of Christmas as key evidence.

The franchise has generally embraced rather than explained away such inconsistencies. As one retrospective noted, the anachronisms represent "more a commitment to an ongoing joke than a serious attempt to construct a believable setting," consistent with the show's identity as "a satire of 1960s suburbia set at the dawn of time." This approach allowed the show to use the prehistoric setting as a lens through which to comment on contemporary American life, including the commercialization and family dynamics associated with the modern Christmas holiday.

== See also ==
- Adaptations of A Christmas Carol
- List of Christmas films
- List of films featuring dinosaurs
