= A Flintstone Family Christmas =

1993 animated Christmas special

- Written by: Sean Roche; David Ehrman
- Directed by: Ray Patterson
- Voices of: Henry Corden; Jean Vander Pyl; Frank Welker; B.J. Ward; John Stephenson; Christine Cavanaugh
- Composer: Steven Bramson
- Country of origin: United States
- Original language: English

Production
- Executive producers: William Hanna; Joseph Barbera
- Producer: Larry Huber
- Running time: 23 minutes
- Production company: Hanna-Barbera Cartoons (Note: Animation outsourced to Fil-Cartoons.)

Original release
- Network: ABC
- Release: December 18, 1993

A Flintstone Family Christmas (known in a working title as The Flintstones: Christmas Misdemeanors) is a 1993 animated Christmas television special featuring characters from The Flintstones franchise. It was produced by Hanna-Barbera and aired on ABC on December 18, 1993. The special was nominated for a Primetime Emmy Award in 1994 for Outstanding Animated Program (For Programming Less Than One Hour).

This is the latest story, chronologically, in the Flintstones fictional universe, taking place approximately 25 years after the end of the original series and the conclusion of a trilogy of specials featuring Pebbles Flintstone and Bamm-Bamm Rubble as adults. A Flintstones Christmas Carol, the next Flintstones film, returned the characters to the ages they were in the original series. (An additional film, On the Rocks, takes place at an ambiguous time after the end of the original series, but without Fred and Wilma's adopted son Stoney, who was introduced in A Flintstone Family Christmas but was retconned out of On the Rocks.)

== Plot ==
The Flintstones get into the Christmas spirit by hanging up decorations while awaiting the arrival of their daughter Pebbles, her husband Bamm-Bamm and their twin children, Roxy and Chip. While waiting for their arrival flight from Hollyrock, Fred and Barney leave to get a turkeysaurus for dinner. However, on the way back home they are mugged by a fake Santa, who takes Fred's watch & wallet and orders Barney to give him the bird. Barney's tossing the turkeysaurus causes the Santa (two children) to "break" in half. Seizing the opportunity, the two run away from the muggers.

At the police station, the family identifies one mugger, who turns out to be an abandoned child named Stoney. A social worker tells them of Stoney's history of stealing from various orphanages and foster homes. Feeling sympathy for Stoney, Wilma decides to take him in as a ward, despite Fred's initial reluctance. They try to show Stoney their trust and attempt to teach him that stealing is wrong.

However, things get slightly bleaker when Pebbles and her family get stuck in an airport due to a blizzard. The Rubbles and the Flintstones go Christmas tree shopping, but cannot afford a large one. Stoney attempts to help raise cash for the tree by running a scammed shell game. When a man loses, he chases Stoney and tells Fred of the boy's scam. Fred asks if this is true, Stoney replies 'no'. Fred reiterates this claim, only to get hit in the head with a tree by the man.

Fred is sent to the hospital, where Mr. Slate informs him that he cannot attend the Christmas parade as Santa (Fred's favourite Christmas tradition) due to his injuries. To make it up to Fred, Stoney poses as Mr.Slate's driver and locks him up in the Flintstone's bathroom, so Fred can participate. Instead, Fred saves his boss and ends up in jail, where he eventually bonds with Stoney, telling him that cutting corners to get what you want is not the solution. After the two are bailed, the social worker attempts to take Stoney to a juvenile facility, but Fred escapes with Stoney in his parade sleigh.

Pebbles, Bamm-Bamm and the grandchildren manage to arrive on Christmas Eve. Fred says that the new addition to the family gets to put the star on the Christmas tree, meaning that Stoney is now an officially adopted Flintstone. The now extended Flintstone & Rubble family proceed to enjoy the holiday.

== Voice cast ==
=== Main cast ===
- Henry Corden as Fred Flintstone
- Jean Vander Pyl as Wilma Flintstone
- Frank Welker as Barney Rubble, Dino
- B.J. Ward as Betty Rubble
- John Stephenson as Mr. Slate
- Christine Cavanaugh as Stoney
- Didi Conn as Stella
- Megan Mullally as Pebbles Flintstone-Rubble
- Jerry Houser as Bamm-Bamm Rubble

=== Additional voice cast ===
- Charlie Adler
- Hamilton Camp
- Nick Jameson
- Robert Ridgely
- Kath Soucie
- Alan Young

== Home media ==
A Flintstone Family Christmas was originally released on VHS by Turner Home Entertainment in the Cartoon Network Video line on September 24, 1996, entitled The Flintstones: Christmas in Bedrock.

On September 27, 2011, Warner Home Video's Warner Archive released A Flintstone Family Christmas on DVD in region 1 via their Hanna–Barbera Classics Collection, in a release entitled A Flintstone Christmas Collection. This is a Manufacture-on-Demand (MOD) release, available exclusively through Warner's online store and Amazon.com. The special received an HD restoration when it was released on HBO Max.

== Other media ==
A hardcover storybook adaptation - A Very Special Flintstones' Family Christmas by Lisa Ann Marsoli based on the teleplay written by Sean Roche and David Ehrman - was released by Turner Publishing on October 1, 1993.
