= Jean Vander Pyl =

American voice actress (1919–1999)

- Publicity photo of Jean Vander Pyl
- Born: Jean Thurston Vander Pyl; October 11, 1919; Philadelphia, Pennsylvania, U.S.
- Died: April 10, 1999 (aged 79); Dana Point, California, U.S.
- Other name: Jean Vanderpyl
- Occupation: Voice actress
- Years active: 1939–1997
- Spouses: Carroll G. O'Meara (m. 1939; died 1962) Roger Wells DeWitt (m. 1963; died 1992)
- Children: 4

Jean Thurston Vander Pyl (October 11, 1919 – April 10, 1999) was an American voice actress. Although her career spanned many decades, she is best known as the voice of Wilma Flintstone for the Hanna-Barbera cartoon The Flintstones. In addition to Wilma Flintstone, she also provided the voices of Pebbles Flintstone; Rosie the robot maid from The Jetsons; Goldie, Lola Glamour, Nurse LaRue, and other characters in Top Cat; Winsome Witch on The Secret Squirrel Show; and Ogee on The Magilla Gorilla Show.

== Early life and career ==
Vander Pyl was born in Philadelphia to John Howard and Kathleen Hale Vander Pyl. Jean's grandfather had come from the Netherlands. Her father was the district manager for Knit Underwear; her mother was from Tennessee. The two died within six months of each other in the early 1950s.

By 1939, Vander Pyl was already working as a radio actress. She was heard during the early 1950s on such programs as The Halls of Ivy (1950–52), as well as Father Knows Best on which she portrayed Margaret Anderson (the role was played on television by Jane Wyatt). Vander Pyl made numerous TV appearances as an actress in programs such as Leave It to Beaver, The Donna Reed Show, Father Knows Best, The Beverly Hillbillies, That Girl, and Petticoat Junction. She also had a cameo appearance in the 1994 live-action film version of The Flintstones as Mrs. Feldspar, an elderly woman in a conga line right behind Dino. One of her final TV appearances was in the opening scene of the season-two Murder, She Wrote episode, "One Good Bid Deserves a Murder".

=== Voice work ===
Vander Pyl is best known as the voice of Wilma Flintstone in the original Flintstones television series. She told an interviewer in 1995 that she received $250 per episode (equal to $2720.75 today) for making The Flintstones, and in 1966, when the series ended, she opted to accept $15,000 (equal to $148846.15 today) lieu of residual payments from syndication. The Flintstones ran in syndication across the globe for decades. At the time, Vander Pyl lived in San Clemente, California, and remarked: "If I got residuals, I wouldn't live in San Clemente. I'd own San Clemente."

Most of Vander Pyl's voice acting work was for the Hanna-Barbera studio, for which she played her first voice role in 1958 on an episode of The Huckleberry Hound Show, voicing an actress character in "Show Biz Bear", an episode on the Yogi Bear segment. She did additional voices, such as the Narrator and Southern belles and beautiful girls, on The Quick Draw McGraw Show, Snagglepuss, and The Yogi Bear Show. In 1961–62, Vander Pyl played Nurse Larue, Charlie the baby, Goldie, Lola Glamour, and additional voices on multiple episodes of Top Cat and in 1962, she performed a particularly memorable role, that of Rosie, the Jetsons' robotic maid. Twenty-three years later, in 1985, she reprised the Rosie character on the returning series.

In later years, Vander Pyl did the voices of Maw Rugg and her daughter Floral Rugg on a rural-set cartoon, The Hillbilly Bears as well as Winsome Witch, both cartoons being segments on The Atom Ant/Secret Squirrel Show (1965–1967). She was also the voice of Little Ogee on The Magilla Gorilla Show. In 1969, she guest-starred on the Scooby-Doo, Where Are You! episode "Foul Play in Funland", playing Sarah Jenkins.

During the 1970s, Vander Pyl was the voice of Marge Huddles, the main character's wife, on Where's Huddles?, a role similar to that of Wilma Flintstone, and on which she was reunited with her Flintstones castmates Alan Reed and Mel Blanc. She went on to voice Mrs. Finkerton on Inch High, Private Eye, and several female characters on Hong Kong Phooey, The Tom and Jerry Show, and Captain Caveman and the Teen Angels.

During the 1980s and 1990s, Vander Pyl did voices on Mister T, Snorks, and Yogi's Treasure Hunt; as well as The Flintstone Kids as Mrs. Slaghoople. She reprised the Wilma Flintstone character on spin-off series and films such as The Flintstone Comedy Hour, The New Fred and Barney Show, The Flintstone Comedy Show, The Jetsons Meet the Flintstones, I Yabba-Dabba Do!, Hollyrock-a-Bye Baby, and A Flintstones Christmas Carol.

Her final roles were that of Wilma Flintstone on What a Cartoon! episode "Dino: Stay Out!" in 1995; on A Flintstone Family Christmas in 1996; and on The Weird Al Show in 1997.

== Personal life ==
Vander Pyl was married twice and was a widow twice over. She married Carroll G. O'Meara on March 9, 1939; together they had three children. O'Meara died on February 18, 1962, at the age of 53. She then married her second husband Roger Wells DeWitt in 1963; the couple had one son. They remained married until DeWitt's death in 1992.

== Death ==
On April 10, 1999, Vander Pyl died of lung cancer at her home in Dana Point, California, at the age of 79. She is interred in Ascension Cemetery in Lake Forest, California.

Jean Vander Pyl was the last surviving original cast member of The Flintstones.

== Filmography ==
=== Film ===
- Deep in My Heart (1954) - Miss Zimmermann (uncredited)
- Hey There, It's Yogi Bear! (1964) - (voice)
- The Man Called Flintstone (1966) - Wilma Flintstone (voice)
- Santa and the Three Bears (1970) - Nana (voice)
- Energy: A National Issue (1977, Short) - Wilma Flintstone (voice)
- The Jetsons Meet the Flintstones (1987, TV Movie) - Wilma Flintstone / Rosie / Mrs. Spacely (voice)
- Rockin' with Judy Jetson (1988, TV Movie) - Rosie (voice)
- Jetsons: The Movie (1990) - Rosie the Robot (voice)
- I Yabba-Dabba Do! (1993, TV movie) - Wilma Flintstone / Mrs. Slate (voice)
- Hollyrock-a-Bye Baby (1993, TV Movie) - Wilma Flintstone (voice)
- The Flintstones (1994) - Mrs. Feldspar (cameo)
- A Flintstones Christmas Carol (1994, TV Movie) - Wilma Flintstone (voice)
- The Flintstones Christmas in Bedrock (1996, TV Movie) - Wilma Flintstone (voice)

=== Television ===
- Jane Wyman Presents The Fireside Theatre (1955) -
- The Millionaire (1955) - Party Guest
- Big Town (1956) -
- Medic (1956) - Julia
- Leave It to Beaver (1957–1963) - Mrs. Hansen, Mrs. Thompson, Mrs. Woods
- The Huckleberry Hound Show (1958–1960) - various voices
- The Flagstones (1959) - pitch reel pilot - Wilma
- The Quick Draw McGraw Show (1959–1961) - Hazel, various voices
- Mister Magoo (1960) - various voices
- Loopy De Loop (1960–1965) - various voices
- The Flintstones (1960–1966) - 166 episodes - Wilma Flintstone, Pebbles Flintstone, additional voices
- The Yogi Bear Show (1961) - various voices
- Top Cat (1961–1962) - various voices
- The Jetsons (1962–1963, 1985–1987) - 45 episodes - Rosie the Robot, Mrs. Spacely
- The Magilla Gorilla Show (1964–1966) - 9 episodes - Ogee, Old Lady, Fairy Godmother
- The Secret Squirrel Show (1965) - 26 episodes - Winsome Witch, additional voices
- The Atom Ant Show (1965–1966) - 26 episodes - Maw Rugg, Floral Rugg
- Scooby-Doo, Where Are You! (1969) - five episodes - Mrs. Cutler, Candy Mint, Princess's Owner, Sarah Jenkins, Swami Customer, additional voices
- Where's Huddles? (1970) - 10 episodes - Marge Huddles
- The Pebbles and Bamm-Bamm Show (1971–1972) - 10 episodes - Wilma Flintstone
- The Tonight Show Starring Johnny Carson (1971) - episode - 11-4-1971 - herself
- The ABC Saturday Superstar Movie (1972) - episode - "Yogi's Ark Lark" - Maw Rugg, Floral Rugg, Woman
- The Flintstone Comedy Hour (1972) - 18 episodes - Wilma Flintstone
- Yogi's Gang (1973) - various voices
- Inch High, Private Eye (1973) - 13 episodes - Mrs. Finkerton
- Hong Kong Phooey (1974) - Various
- Mumbly (1976) - Additional voices
- The All New Superfriends Hour - Dr. Xra (in "The Man Beasts of Xra"), Magda Duval (in "The Marsh Monster")
- Fred Flintstone and Friends (1977–1978) - 95 episodes - Wilma Flintstone
- Captain Caveman and the Teen Angels (1977–1980) - additional voices
- A Flintstone Christmas (1977) - TV Special - Wilma Flintstone, Pebbles Flintstone
- The Flintstones: Little Big League (1978) - TV special - Wilma Flintstone
- The All New Popeye Hour (1978) - segment - "Dinky Dog" - additional voices
- The New Fred and Barney Show (1979) - 17 episodes - Wilma Flintstone, Pebbles Flintstone
- Fred and Barney Meet the Thing (1979) - 13 episodes - Wilma Flintstone, Pebbles Flintstone
- The Flintstones Meet Rockula and Frankenstone (1979) - TV special - Wilma Flintstone, Gladys
- Fred and Barney Meet the Shmoo (1979–1980) - 17 episodes - Wilma Flintstone, Pebbles Flintstone
- The Flintstones' New Neighbors (1980) - TV special - Wilma Flintstone, Pebbles Flintstone
- The Flintstones: Fred's Final Fling (1980) - TV special - Wilma Flintstone, Pebbles Flintstone
- The Flintstone Comedy Show (1980–1981) - 18 episodes - Wilma Flintstone
- The Flintstones: Wind-Up Wilma (1981) - TV special - Wilma Flintstone, Pebbles Flintstone
- The Flintstones: Jogging Fever (1981) - TV special - Wilma Flintstone, Pebbles Flintstone
- Rosie (1982) - episode: "Stacey Comes To Visit" - Aunt Linda
- The New Scooby and Scrappy-Doo Show (1983) - various voices
- Mister T (1983) - various voices
- Hardcastle and McCormick (1985) - episode - "Games People Play" - Agnes O'Toole
- Snorks (1985) - additional voices
- Blacke's Magic (1986) - Older Woman
- Murder, She Wrote (1986) - episode - "One Good Bid Deserves a Murder" - Fan
- The Flintstones' 25th Anniversary Celebration (1986) - TV Special - Wilma Flintstone
- The Flintstone Kids (1986–1988) - 32 episodes - Pearl Slaghoople
- The Flintstone Kids' "Just Say No" Special (1988) - TV special - Pearl Slaghoople, various voices
- Hanna-Barbera's 50th: A Yabba Dabba Doo Celebration (1989) - TV special - Wilma Flintstone
- Wake, Rattle, and Roll (1990) - segment - "Fender Bender 500" - 50 episodes - Winsome Witch
- The Funtastic World of Hanna-Barbera (1990) - ride show - Wilma Flintstone, Rosie the Robot
- A Flintstone Family Christmas (1993) - TV special - Wilma Flintstone
- What a Cartoon! (1995) - episode - "Dino: Stay Out!" - Wilma Flintstone
- The Weird Al Show - episode (1997) - "Talent Show" - Wilma Flintstone - (final appearance)

| Preceded by None | Voice of Wilma Flintstone; 1959–1999 | Succeeded by Tress MacNeille |
