= 1979–80 United States network television schedule (daytime) =

The following is the 1979–80 daytime network television schedule for the three major English-language commercial broadcast networks in the United States. It covers the weekday and weekend daytime hours from September 1979 to August 1980.

== Legend ==
- Light yellow indicates talk shows.
- Green indicates soap operas.
- Pink indicates game shows.
- Gold indicates news and public affairs programming.
- Light teal indicates sporting events.
- White indicates local programming.
- Light purple indicates children's programming.
- Gray indicates encore programming (e.g., reruns of prime-time programming).
- New series are highlighted in **bold**.

== Schedule ==
- All times correspond to U.S. Eastern and Pacific Time scheduling (except for some live sports or events). Except where affiliates slot certain programs outside their network-dictated timeslots, subtract one hour for Central, Mountain, Alaska, and Hawaii-Aleutian times.
- Local schedules may differ, as affiliates have the option to pre-empt or delay network programs. Such scheduling may be limited to preemptions caused by local or national breaking news or weather coverage (which may force stations to tape delay certain programs to other timeslots) and any major sports events scheduled to air in a weekday timeslot (mainly during major holidays). Stations may air shows at other times at their preference.

=== Monday–Friday ===
Network		6:00 am	6:30 am	7:00 am	7:30 am	8:00 am	8:30 am	9:00 am	9:30 am	10:00 am	10:30 am	11:00 am	11:30 am	noon	12:30 pm	1:00 pm	1:30 pm	2:00 pm	2:30 pm	3:00 pm	3:30 pm	4:00 pm	4:30 pm	5:00 pm	5:30 pm	6:00 pm	6:30 pm
ABC	Fall	Local/syndicated programming		Good Morning America				Local/syndicated programming				Laverne & Shirley	Family Feud	The $20,000 Pyramid	Ryan's Hope	All My Children		One Life to Live		General Hospital		The Edge of Night	Local/syndicated programming				ABC World News Tonight
ABC	Summer	Local/syndicated programming		Good Morning America				Local/syndicated programming				**The Love Boat**		Family Feud	Ryan's Hope	All My Children		One Life to Live		General Hospital		The Edge of Night	Local/syndicated programming				ABC World News Tonight
CBS	Fall	Sunrise Semester	Local/syndicated programming	Morning		Captain Kangaroo		Local/syndicated programming		**Beat the Clock**	Whew! / Celebrity Whew! (starting Nov. 5) CBS News Newsbreak (10:57)	The Price Is Right		Local/syndicated programming	Search for Tomorrow	The Young and the Restless	As the World Turns		Guiding Light		**One Day at a Time**	Love of Life	Local/syndicated programming				CBS Evening News
CBS	February	Sunrise Semester	Local/syndicated programming	Morning		Captain Kangaroo		Local/syndicated programming		The Jeffersons	Whew! / Celebrity Whew! (starting Nov. 5) CBS News Newsbreak (10:57)	The Price Is Right		Local/syndicated programming	Search for Tomorrow	The Young and the Restless		As the World Turns CBS News Newsbreak (2:57)		Guiding Light		One Day at a Time	Local/syndicated programming				CBS Evening News
CBS	Summer	Sunrise Semester	Local/syndicated programming	Morning		Captain Kangaroo		Local/syndicated programming		The Jeffersons	Alice	The Price Is Right CBS News Newsbreak (11:57)		Local/syndicated programming	Search for Tomorrow	The Young and the Restless		As the World Turns CBS News Newsbreak (2:57)		Guiding Light		One Day at a Time	Local/syndicated programming				CBS Evening News
NBC	Fall	Local/syndicated programming		Today				Local/syndicated programming		Card Sharks	The Hollywood Squares NBC News Update (10:57)	High Rollers	Wheel of Fortune NBC News Update (11:57)	Mindreaders	Password Plus NBC News Update (12:57)	Days of Our Lives		The Doctors	Another World			Local/syndicated programming					NBC Nightly News
NBC	Winter	Local/syndicated programming		Today				Local/syndicated programming		Card Sharks	The Hollywood Squares NBC News Update (10:57)	High Rollers	Wheel of Fortune NBC News Update (11:57)	**Chain Reaction**	Password Plus NBC News Update (12:57)	Days of Our Lives		The Doctors	Another World			Local/syndicated programming					NBC Nightly News
NBC	Summer	Local/syndicated programming		Today				Local/syndicated programming		**The David Letterman Show**			Wheel of Fortune NBC News Update (11:57)	Card Sharks	Password Plus NBC News Update (12:57)	Days of Our Lives		The Doctors	Another World			Local/syndicated programming					NBC Nightly News
NBC	August	Local/syndicated programming		Today				Local/syndicated programming		The David Letterman Show		Wheel of Fortune	Password Plus	Card Sharks	The Doctors	Days of Our Lives		Another World		**Texas**		Local/syndicated programming					NBC Nightly News

Notes:

- Programs aired before 9:00AM aired at the same time in all time zones. CBS's Sunrise Semester was a half-hour program which aired at either 6:00 or 6:30 AM, depending on the station.
- Programs scheduled after 10:00 AM Eastern aired one hour earlier (starting at 9:00 AM) in the Central and Pacific time zones. Stations in the Mountain time zone that started their network schedule at 8:00 AM would follow the Central and Pacific pattern that year.
- Some network programs, particularly before 7:00 AM and after 10:00/9:00 AM, were subject to preemption by local affiliate stations in favor of syndicated or locally produced programs.
- On ABC, World News Tonight was produced at 6:00 PM Eastern/5:00 PM Central, and aired live by some affiliates. This early feed of the broadcast was discontinued in 1982.
- Love of Life ended its run on the air on CBS on February 1, 1980. It was replaced by reruns of CBS comedy reruns, such as One Day at a Time.
- A CBS News Razzmatazz special would occasionally preempt CBS' 4:00PM show.
- **FYI** aired on ABC at 12:58PM, 2:58PM, and 3:58PM starting January 14.

=== Saturday ===
Network		7:00 am	7:30 am	8:00 am	8:30 am	9:00 am	9:30 am	10:00 am	10:30 am	11:00 am	11:30 am	noon	12:30 pm	1:00 pm	1:30 pm	2:00 pm	2:30 pm	3:00 pm	3:30 pm	4:00 pm	4:30 pm	5:00 pm	5:30 pm	6:00 pm	6:30 pm
ABC	Fall	Local and/or syndicated programming		**The World's Greatest Super Friends** / Schoolhouse Rock! (8:56AM)		**The Plastic Man Comedy/Adventure Show** / Schoolhouse Rock! (10:56AM)				**Spider-Woman** / Schoolhouse Rock! (11:26AM)	**Scooby-Doo and Scrappy-Doo** / Schoolhouse Rock! (11:56AM)	ABC Weekend Special	American Bandstand		ABC Sports and/or local programming									Local news	ABC World News Saturday
ABC	January	Local and/or syndicated programming		**The World's Greatest Super Friends** / Schoolhouse Rock! (8:56AM)		The Plastic Man Comedy/Adventure Show / Schoolhouse Rock! (10:26AM)			Scooby-Doo and Scrappy Doo / Schoolhouse Rock! (11:26AM)		Spider-Woman / Schoolhouse Rock! (11:56AM)	ABC Weekend Special	American Bandstand		ABC Sports and/or local programming									Local news	ABC World News Saturday
ABC	March	Local and/or syndicated programming		**The World's Greatest Super Friends** / Schoolhouse Rock! (8:56AM)		The Plastic Man Comedy/Adventure Show / Schoolhouse Rock! (10:26AM)			Scooby-Doo and Scrappy Doo / Schoolhouse Rock! (11:26AM)		Captain Caveman and the Teen Angels	ABC Weekend Special	American Bandstand		ABC Sports and/or local programming									Local news	ABC World News Saturday
ABC	July	Local and/or syndicated programming		**The World's Greatest Super Friends** / Schoolhouse Rock! (8:56AM)		The Plastic Man Comedy/Adventure Show / Schoolhouse Rock! (10:26AM)			Scooby-Doo and Scrappy Doo / Schoolhouse Rock! (11:26AM)		Laff-A-Lympics (R)	ABC Weekend Special	American Bandstand		ABC Sports and/or local programming									Local news	ABC World News Saturday
CBS	Fall	Local and/or syndicated programming		**The New Adventures of Mighty Mouse and Heckle & Jeckle**		The Bugs Bunny/Road Runner Show			The All New Popeye Hour		The New Fat Albert Show	Jason of Star Command	Tarzan and the Super 7		30 Minutes	CBS Sports and/or local programming								Local news	CBS Evening News
CBS	January	Local and/or syndicated programming		**The New Adventures of Mighty Mouse and Heckle & Jeckle**		The Bugs Bunny/Road Runner Show			The All New Popeye Hour		The New Fat Albert Show	Shazam! (R)	Tarzan and the Super 7		30 Minutes	CBS Sports and/or local programming								Local news	CBS Evening News
NBC	Fall	Local and/or syndicated programming		The Daffy Duck Show	**Casper and the Angels**	**Fred and Barney Meet the Thing**		**The Super Globetrotters**	**The New Shmoo**	**The New Adventures of Flash Gordon**	Godzilla	Jonny Quest (R)	The Jetsons (R)	NBC Sports and/or local programming										Local news	NBC Nightly News
NBC	November	Local and/or syndicated programming		The Daffy Duck Show	**Casper and the Angels**	**Fred and Barney Meet the Thing**		**The Super Globetrotters**	**The New Shmoo**	**The New Adventures of Flash Gordon**	Godzilla	**Hot Hero Sandwich**		NBC Sports and/or local programming										Local news	NBC Nightly News
NBC	December	Local and/or syndicated programming		The Godzilla/Globetrotters Adventure Hour		**Fred and Barney Meet the Shmoo**			The Daffy Duck Show	Casper and the Angels	The New Adventures of Flash Gordon	NFL '79	NFL on NBC and local programming												
NBC	January	Local and/or syndicated programming		The Godzilla/Globetrotters Adventure Hour		**Fred and Barney Meet the Shmoo**			The Daffy Duck Show	Casper and the Angels	The Jetsons (R)	Hot Hero Sandwich		NBC Sports and/or local programming										Local news	NBC Nightly News
NBC	April	Local and/or syndicated programming		The Super Globetrotters	Casper and the Angels	**Fred and Barney Meet the Shmoo**			The Daffy Duck Show	The Jetsons (R)	Jonny Quest (R)	Godzilla	The New Adventures of Flash Gordon	NBC Sports and/or local programming										Local news	NBC Nightly News
NBC	May	Local and/or syndicated programming		The Godzilla/Globetrotters Adventure Hour		**Fred and Barney Meet the Shmoo**			The Daffy Duck Show	The Jetsons (R)	Jonny Quest (R)	Godzilla	The New Adventures of Flash Gordon	NBC Sports and/or local programming										Local news	NBC Nightly News

In the News aired ten times during CBS's Saturday morning shows.

On NBC, Ask NBC News aired after Casper and the Angels, Super Globetrotters, and The New Adventures of Flash Gordon, and Time Out aired after Fred and Barney Meet the Thing, The New Shmoo and Godzilla.

- By the end of the season, Ask NBC News aired after The Godzilla/Globetrotters Adventure Hour, Fred and Barney Meet the Shmoo, and The Daffy Duck Show, and Time Out aired after The Jetsons and Jonny Quest.

=== Sunday ===
Network		7:00 am	7:30 am	8:00 am	8:30 am	9:00 am	9:30 am	10:00 am	10:30 am	11:00 am	11:30 am	noon	12:30 pm	1:00 pm	1:30 pm	2:00 pm	2:30 pm	3:00 pm	3:30 pm	4:00 pm	4:30 pm	5:00 pm	5:30 pm	6:00 pm	6:30 pm
ABC		Local and/or syndicated programming						Kids Are People Too			Animals, Animals, Animals	Issues and Answers	ABC Sports and/or local programming											Local news	ABC World News Sunday
CBS	Fall	The Robonic Stooges (R)	The Skatebirds (R)	Local and/or syndicated programming		CBS News Sunday Morning			Local and/or syndicated programming		Face the Nation	Local and/or syndicated programming	The NFL Today	NFL on CBS and/or local programming											
CBS	Mid-winter	The Robonic Stooges (R)	The Skatebirds (R)	Local and/or syndicated programming		CBS News Sunday Morning			Local and/or syndicated programming		Face the Nation	CBS Sports and/or local programming												Local news	CBS Evening News
CBS	Spring	The Skatebirds (R)	The Robonic Stooges (R)	Local and/or syndicated programming		CBS News Sunday Morning			Local and/or syndicated programming		Face the Nation	CBS Sports and/or local programming												Local news	CBS Evening News
NBC	Fall	Local and/or syndicated programming										Meet the Press	NFL '79	NFL on NBC and local programming											
NBC	Mid-winter	Local and/or syndicated programming										Meet the Press	NBC Sports and/or local programming											Local news	NBC Nightly News

== By network ==
=== ABC ===
**Returning Series**

- The $20,000 Pyramid
- ABC Weekend Special
- ABC World News Tonight
- All My Children
- American Bandstand
- Animals, Animals, Animals
- Captain Caveman and the Teen Angels
- The Edge of Night
- Family Feud
- General Hospital
- Good Morning America
- Issues and Answers
- Kids Are People Too
- Laff-A-Lympics (reruns)
- Laverne & Shirley (reruns)
- One Life to Live
- Ryan's Hope
- Schoolhouse Rock!

**New Series**

- **The Love Boat** (reruns)
- **The Plastic Man Comedy/Adventure Show**
- **Scooby-Doo and Scrappy-Doo**
- **Spider-Woman**
- **The World's Greatest Super Friends**

**Not Returning From 1978-79**

- The All New Pink Panther Show
- Bigfoot and Wildboy
- Challenge of the Super Friends
- Fangface
- Happy Days (reruns)
- Scooby's All Stars (reruns)
- Scooby-Doo, Where Are You!

=== CBS ===
**Returning Series**

- 30 Minutes
- The All New Popeye Hour
- As the World Turns
- The Bugs Bunny/Road Runner Hour
- Captain Kangaroo
- CBS Children's Film Festival
- CBS Evening News
- CBS News Sunday Morning
- Face the Nation
- The New Fat Albert Show
- Guiding Light
- Jason of Star Command
- Love of Life
- Morning
- The Price Is Right
- The Robonic Stooges (reruns)
- Search for Tomorrow
- Shazam! (reruns)
- The Skatebirds (reruns)
- Sunrise Semester
- Tarzan and the Super 7
- Tarzan, Lord of the Jungle
- Whew!
- The Young and the Restless

**New Series**

- **Alice** (reruns)
- **Beat the Clock**
- **The Jeffersons** (reruns)
- **The New Adventures of Mighty Mouse and Heckle & Jeckle**
- **One Day at a Time** (reruns)

**Not Returning From 1978-79**

- All in the Family (reruns)
- Ark II (reruns)
- Camera Three
- Clue Club (reruns)
- Lamp Unto My Feet
- Look Up and Live
- M*A*S*H (reruns)
- Match Game moved to syndication
- Space Academy (reruns)
- Tattletales
- What's New, Mr. Magoo? (reruns)

=== NBC ===
**Returning Series**

- Another World
- The Daffy Duck Show
- Days of Our Lives
- The Doctors
- Card Sharks
- Godzilla
- High Rollers
- The Hollywood Squares
- The Jetsons (reruns)
- Jonny Quest (reruns)
- Meet the Press
- NBC Nightly News
- Mindreaders
- Password Plus
- Today
- Wheel of Fortune

**New Series**

- **Casper and the Angels**
- **Chain Reaction**
- **The David Letterman Show**
- **Fred and Barney Meet the Shmoo**
- **Fred and Barney Meet the Thing**
- **Hot Hero Sandwich**
- **The New Adventures of Flash Gordon**
- **The New Shmoo**
- **The Super Globetrotters**
- **Texas**

**Not Returning From 1978-79**

- All Star Secrets
- The Alvin Show (reruns)
- America Alive!
- Baggy Pants and the Nitwits (reruns)
- Buford and the Galloping Ghost
- Fabulous Funnies
- The New Fantastic Four
- Galaxy Goof-Ups
- Jana of the Jungle
- Jeopardy! returned in 1984 in first-run syndication
- The Krofft Superstar Hour
- The New Fred and Barney Show
- The Metric Marvels
- Yogi's Space Race

== See also ==
- 1979-80 United States network television schedule (prime-time)
- 1979-80 United States network television schedule (late night)

== Sources ==
- https://web.archive.org/web/20071015122215/http://curtalliaume.com/abc_day.html
- https://web.archive.org/web/20071015122235/http://curtalliaume.com/cbs_day.html
- https://web.archive.org/web/20071012211242/http://curtalliaume.com/nbc_day.html
