= List of animated television series of 1979 =

A list of animated television series first aired in 1979.

Animated television series first aired in 1979
Title	Episodes	Country	Year	Notes	Technique
Alfons Åberg		Sweden	1979		Traditional
Amigo and Friends	52	Mexico; United States	1979		Traditional
Anne of Green Gables	50	Japan	1979		Anime
Les Aventures de Plume d'Elan		France	1979		Traditional
Bannertail: The Story of Gray Squirrel	26	Japan	1979		Anime
The Brown Hornet		United States	1979	Single segment on The New Fat Albert Show	Traditional
Casper and the Angels	13	United States	1979	Spin-off of Casper the Friendly Ghost.	Traditional
Cyborg 009	50	Japan	1979–80		Anime
Doctor Snuggles	13	United Kingdom	1979		Traditional
Don Quijote de La Mancha	39	Spain	1979–80		Traditional
Doraemon	1787	Japan	1979–2005		Anime
Dr. Henry's Emergency Lessons for People	8	United States	1979–80		Traditional
Emily	49	France	1979		Traditional
Fred and Barney Meet the Shmoo	13	United States	1979–80	Package series	Traditional
Fred and Barney Meet the Thing	13	United States	1979	Package series	Traditional
Future Robot Daltanious	47	Japan	1979–80		Anime
Gatchaman Fighter	48	Japan	1979–80		Anime
Gordian Warrior	73	Japan	1979–81		Anime
Hana no Ko Lunlun	50	Japan	1979–80		Anime
Josephina the Whale	24	Japan	1979		Anime
King Arthur and the Knights of the Round Table	30	Japan	1979–80		Anime
Manga Sarutobi Sasuke	24	Japan	1979–80		Anime
Mighty Man and Yukk	32	United States	1979–80	The Plastic Man Version	Traditional
Misha the Little Bear	26	Japan	1979–80		Anime
Mobile Suit Gundam	43	Japan	1979–80		Anime
The New Adventures of Flash Gordon	32	United States	1979–82	Based on Flash Gordon	Traditional
The New Adventures of Mighty Mouse and Heckle & Jeckle	16	United States	1979–80	Spin-off of Mighty Mouse and Heckle and Jeckle.	Traditional
The New Fred and Barney Show	17	United States	1979	Spin-off of The Flintstones. Aired as both a standalone series and as part of Fred and Barney Meet the Thing and Fred and Barney Meet the Shmoo.	Traditional
The New Shmoo	16	United States	1979–80	Also aired as part of Fred and Barney Meet the Shmoo.	Traditional
The Perishers	20	United Kingdom	1979		Traditional
The Plastic Man Comedy/Adventure Show	130	United States	1979–81		Traditional
Rickety Rocket	16	United States	1979–80		Traditional
The Rose of Versailles	40	Japan	1979–80		Anime
Scooby-Doo and Scrappy-Doo	16	United States	1979–80	Spin-off of Scooby-Doo, Where Are You!.	Traditional
Shin Kyojin no Hoshi II	23	Japan	1979		Anime
Space Carrier Blue Noah	24	Japan	1979–80		Anime
Spider-Woman	16	United States	1979–80		Traditional
Star Blazers	77	United States; Japan	1979–84	English version of Space Battleship Yamato.	Traditional
The Super Globetrotters	13	United States	1979	Spin-off of Harlem Globetrotters.	Traditional
The Thing	13	United States	1979	Also aired as part of Fred and Barney Meet the Thing and Fred and Barney Meet the Shmoo.	Traditional
The Ultraman	50	Japan	1979–80		Anime
What-a-Mess	22	United Kingdom	1979–90		Traditional
The World's Greatest SuperFriends	8	United States	1979	Spin-off of Super Friends	Traditional
Zenderman	52	Japan	1979–80		Anime

== See also ==
- List of animated feature films of 1979
- List of Japanese animation television series of 1979
