= Recurring character =

Role in fiction

A recurring character is a fictional character, usually in a prime time TV series, who frequently appears from time to time during the series' run. Recurring characters often play major roles in more than one episode, sometimes being the main focus. They may be contrasted with "regular" characters, who typically appear in every or almost every episode of a series. Recurring characters appear less frequently than regulars, but more frequently than guest star characters, who may appear in only one, two or more episodes without being expected to return.

Recurring characters sometimes start out as guest stars in one episode, who then reappear in future episodes because creators or audiences found the actors or storylines compelling enough to revisit. Sometimes a recurring character eventually becomes part of the main cast of characters; such a character is sometimes called a breakout character. Some notable examples of main characters who were originally recurring characters are: Eli Gold on The Good Wife; Leo Chingkwake on That '70s Show; Spike and Oz on Buffy the Vampire Slayer; Marc St. James on Ugly Betty; Vanessa Abrams on Gossip Girl; Zack Allan on Babylon 5; Steve Urkel on Family Matters; Donna Moss on The West Wing; Steve Harrington on Stranger Things; and Felicity Smoak on Arrow.

In other cases, recurring characters have been given spin-off series of their own, such as Dr. Frasier Crane who originally was a recurring character on Cheers. Kelsey Grammer, along with fellow recurring actor John Ratzenberger were hired for seven episodes, to play Frasier Crane and Cliff Clavin respectively. Cliff was scheduled to recur during the 1982–1983 season, Frasier to recur during 1984–1985 season. Both actors were subsequently upgraded to the main cast, and Crane continued in his own series following the end of Cheers. Buffy the Vampire Slayer's Angel progressed from recurring character to main character on Buffy to series hero in the spin-off Angel.

On sketch comedy programs, recurring characters are generally a staple. For example, in the sketch comedy series Your Show of Shows, Sid Caesar used the concept frequently:

As we were building and evolving our sketch comedy, we would look for new types of sketches that had legs (not caterpillar legs). We liked the idea of recurring characters and themes. It gave us something we could start with and something the audience could connect with.

— Sid Caesar, Caesar's Hours: My Life in Comedy, with Love and Laughter

Usually they appear in their own sketch and the sketch itself can become a regular part of the show. Some notable examples include the Church Lady and Hans and Franz from Saturday Night Live, the Gumbys from Monty Python's Flying Circus, and Bob and Doug McKenzie from SCTV. However, the characters are not always limited to their own sketches. Sometimes, characters from a recurring sketch go on to appear in other sketches, or develop into their own TV shows. For example, when The Carol Burnett Show was canceled the central character of a popular recurring sketch called The Family, Thelma "Mama" Harper, went on to have her own show Mama's Family. Also, recurring characters in sketch comedy shows can go on to have their own movies. This is especially true with Saturday Night Live which has had many recurring characters turn into movies such as Stuart Smalley, Wayne and Garth of Wayne's World, The Blues Brothers, and The Ladies Man. Recurring characters may even revisit shows long after the actor who played them has left the cast, for example, the character Mary Katherine Gallagher was portrayed by Molly Shannon when she hosted Saturday Night Live in 2007, six years after she left the cast. Sometimes a recurring character from one show appears on another show, such as when Dave Thomas and Rick Moranis hosted Saturday Night Live in 1983 and portrayed Bob and Doug MacKenzie, or when Emily Litella (portrayed by Gilda Radner) from Saturday Night Live appeared on The Muppet Show in 1978. Sacha Baron Cohen's character Ali G is another example, originating on the Channel Four series The Eleven O'Clock Show. The character was such a huge success that Cohen got his own show as the original show was cancelled.

Recurring characters are not limited to television. In the early 20th century, the Saturday Evening Post frequently had recurring characters in their cover art, such as Baby New Year. The Shmoo was a recurring character in the comic strip Li'l Abner, which eventually went on to appear in the TV cartoon series Fred and Barney Meet the Shmoo and The New Shmoo. The Sherlock Holmes series of novels by Arthur Conan Doyle featured well-known recurring characters such as Inspector Lestrade and Mrs. Hudson.

In American daytime soap operas, recurring characters are ones played by actors who do not have a contract. They are not obligated to play the role and have no guarantee of work. Actors on recurring status used to be referred to as day players.

== See also ==
- Supporting character
