= Shmoo (disambiguation) =

Shmoo is a cartoon character created by Al Capp in the strip Li'l Abner.

Shmoo or Schmoo may refer to:

- Shmoos, nickname of the Cosmic Ray Detection Units of CHICOS (California High School Cosmic Ray Observatory)
- Shmoo plot, an electrical engineering graphical display of the response of a component or system
- Shmoo (yeast), projection from yeast in response to mating pheromones
- Shmoo, a bird skin, typically as specimens for bird collections

== See also ==
- Smoo Cave, a sea cave near Durness in north-west Scotland
- Schmuck, a pejorative sometimes euphemized as shmo
