= Quantum GP700 =

Australian open-wheel sports car

Overview
- Production: 2016–2019
- Designer: Jeff David

Body and chassis
- Class: Open-wheel sports car
- Layout: RMR

Powertrain
- Engine: 2.7 L (160 cu in) DOHC inline-4 turbocharged mid-engined
- Transmission: Holinger 6-speed sequential semi-automatic

Dimensions
- Wheelbase: 2,650 mm (104.3 in)
- Length: 4,120 mm (162.2 in)
- Width: 1,740 mm (68.5 in)
- Height: 1,300 mm (51.2 in)
- Curb weight: 700 kg (1,543 lb)

The Quantum GP700 is a custom track-only open-wheel sports car, designed, developed and built by Australian Jeff David, produced between 2016 and 2019. The car was manufactured and designed through a joint collaboration with a number of institutes and companies, including Keetch3D, Motec, Autronic, Beninca Motors, Holinger Engineering, University of Melbourne Mechanical Engineering, RMIT Mechanical Engineering, Deakin University Mechanical Engineering, and Western Smash repairs. It has a 1:1 power-to-weight ratio, having an engine which produces 700 hp (520 kW), and weighing only 700 kg (1,500 lb).
