= Godzilla (1978 TV series) =

American animated monster television series

- Genre: Kaiju
- Based on: Godzilla by Toho Co., Ltd
- Developed by: Dick Robbins; Duane Poole
- Directed by: Ray Patterson; Carl Urbano; Oscar Dufau (season 2); George Gordon (season 2)
- Voices of: Ted Cassidy; Jeff David; Al Eisenmann; Hilly Hicks; Don Messick; Brenda Thompson
- Composer: Hoyt Curtin
- Country of origin: United States
- No. of seasons: 2
- No. of episodes: 26

Production
- Executive producers: William Hanna; Joseph Barbera
- Producer: Doug Wildey
- Running time: 30 minutes
- Production companies: Hanna-Barbera Productions; Toho Co., Ltd; Benedict Pictures Corporation

Original release
- Network: NBC
- Release: September 9, 1978 – December 8, 1979

Godzilla is an American animated monster television series produced by Hanna-Barbera Productions in association with Henry G. Saperstein. The series premiered on NBC on September 9, 1978, with the title The Godzilla Power Hour. The series continued to air until 1981, packaged with other series under various titles.

The Godzilla Power Hour consisted of half-hour episodes of Godzilla and Jana of the Jungle. A total of 13 original episodes were produced in 1978, with the first eight airing as part of The Godzilla Power Hour. On November 4, 1978, the show was expanded to 90 minutes with the addition of Jonny Quest reruns and retitled The Godzilla Super 90. Split off into its own half-hour, the show aired in its own half-hour timeslot as simply Godzilla on September 8, 1979, and then as The Godzilla/Globetrotters Adventure Hour on November 10, 1979, before another repackaging as The Godzilla/Dynomutt Hour on September 27, 1980, and then The Godzilla/Hong Kong Phooey Hour until its cancellation on May 16, 1981.

The series acquired the retronym of Godzilla: The Original Animated Series for its DVD release.

== Premise ==
The series follows the adventures of a team of scientists on the Calico, a hydrofoil research vessel, headed by Captain Carl Majors. The rest of the crew include scientist Dr. Quinn Darien, her nephew Pete Darien and her research assistant Brock Borden. Also along for the ride is Godzooky, the "cowardly nephew" of Godzilla and Pete's best friend, in a comic foil role in the show. Godzooky can clumsily attempt to fly using the small wings under his arms. Whenever Godzooky tries to breathe fire, he usually just coughs up smoke rings.

The group often call upon Godzilla by using a special signaller when in danger, such as attacks by other giant monsters. Also, Godzooky can roar to summon Godzilla. Godzilla's size in the animated series shifts radically, sometimes within a single episode or even a single scene. For instance, Godzilla's claws can wrap around a large ship, and only minutes later the team of scientists fit rather neatly on Godzilla's palm. In addition, Godzilla's trademark atomic breath is altered so he breathes simple fire. He can also shoot laser beams from his eyes much like Superman's heat vision.

== Voice cast ==
- Jeff David as Captain Carl Majors
- Brenda Thompson as Dr. Quinn Darien
- Hilly Hicks as Brock
- Al Eisenmann as Pete
- Don Messick as Godzooky
- Ted Cassidy as Godzilla (vocal effects)

== Production ==
Toho Studios had considered adapting Godzilla for American TV animation as far back as the late 1960s when they entered negotiations with Filmation for an animated series based on the property that was intended for air during the 1969-70 television season, but the deal ultimately collapsed.

In regard to the origin of the series, Joseph Barbera came up with the idea of licensing Godzilla. He explained in a 1990s interview, "My job back then was to dig up new characters, new ideas, new shows, and I had wanted to do Godzilla for a while. I liked the monster thing, and the way it looked, and I thought we could do a lot with it. So I contacted Hank Saperstein, who was a very good friend and we got talking about it. Then there was an executive at the network who wanted to get into the act, and urged us to lighten the storyline up. So, I came up with the character Godzooky, who was like his son. The show had a sort of father-son relationship, which we had done before on shows like Augie Doggie and Doggie Daddy and Jonny Quest." Doug Wildey, creator of Jonny Quest, came on board as producer. DePatie–Freleng Enterprises had initially been slated to produce the Godzilla series while Hanna-Barbera was to produce The New Fantastic Four, but when DePatie–Freleng acquired the rights to the Fantastic Four, NBC brokered a deal between the studios wherein DePatie–Freleng would produce The New Fantastic Four while Hanna-Barbera would produce Godzilla.

Barbera said that he wanted the series to be more-or-less a straight adaptation of the movie series, but, "When they start telling you in Standards and Practices, 'Don't shoot any flame at anybody, don't step on any buildings or cars,' then pretty soon, they've taken away all the stuff he represents. That became the problem, to maintain a feeling of Godzilla and at the same time cut down everything that he did. We managed to get a fair show out of it. It was OK. Godzooky kind of got the kids going." While Toho licensed Godzilla's likeness and name for the series, Toho refused to authorized the usage of sound effects for Godzilla's iconic roar, so more common monster sounds were utilized. When Wildey first designed the look of Godzilla for the series, his designs were rejected by Toho due to Widley trying to make Godzilla look more like a dinosaur or dragon, and Toho would only approve the designs once Wildey added more ape-like features to Godzilla's face.

== Episodes ==
=== Season 1 (1978) ===
No. overall	No. in season	Title	Original release date
1	1	"The Fire Bird"	September 9, 1978
A mysterious bird with fire powers residing in a volcano leaves to lay eggs in the Arctic. The team and Godzilla try to stop the creature before it melts all of the ice and causes worldwide devastation.
2	2	"The Earth Eater"	September 16, 1978
A mysterious creature is eating the earth under San Francisco. Godzilla and the team must stop the creature before it destroys the city.
3	3	"Attack of the Stone Creature"	September 23, 1978
While investigating an Egyptian pyramid, the team comes under attack by stone creatures able to breathe ice blasts and built to guard the pyramid. Godzilla must destroy them before they wipe out the team.
4	4	"The Megavolt Monster"	September 30, 1978
Mysterious creatures with electrical powers are attacking ships in the Pacific. Godzilla must stop them before they destroy more ships.
5	5	"The Seaweed Monster"	October 7, 1978
A monster made of seaweed threatens an island full of tourists. Godzilla and the team must destroy it before it has a chance to attack.
6	6	"The Energy Beast"	October 14, 1978
After a fight with Godzilla, an alien caterpillar-like monster with shapeshifting powers transforms into a duplicate of him and begins to destroy anything connected to electricity. The team's friendship with Godzilla is put to the test as they try to prove his innocence.
7	7	"The Colossus of Atlantis"	October 21, 1978
The team happens across the ancient city of Atlantis and they (including Godzilla) end up imprisoned in the city. They soon discover that all of the city's residents are in a state of suspended animation and that they can only be released from it by destroying Colossus, the giant robot guarding the city. After the robot is destroyed, it is revealed that Atlantis is a huge UFO which leaves Earth, traveling into outer space.
8	8	"The Horror of Forgotten Island"	October 28, 1978
After the Calico is damaged in a storm, the team ends up on an uncharted island. They soon discover the island is inhabited by a cyclopean monster. Worst of all, Godzilla cannot reach them because of a force field surrounding the island. The team must escape the island and somehow not let the creature escape and threaten the world.
9	9	"Island of Lost Ships"	November 4, 1978
The team discovers the island of the Sirens and other creatures from Greek mythology. The Sirens turn Captain Majors, Quinn, and Brock to stone and put Godzilla to sleep. Pete and Godzooky must find a way to save the others, deal with a Chimera, and escape the island before it disappears at sunset for the next 1,000 years and traps them there.
10	10	"The Magnetic Terror"	November 11, 1978
A magnetically-powered monster is threatening the South Pole. Godzilla and the team must destroy it before it reaches the Pole and destroys the world.
11	11	"The Breeder Beast"	November 18, 1978
An odd creature goes on the attack in Washington, D.C. The team discovers that the creature is made of an explosive material and packs enough energy to level the city. Godzilla must find a way to stop it before it threatens the world.
12	12	"The Sub-Zero Terror"	November 25, 1978
The team becomes stranded in the Himalayas and are imprisoned by a race of Abominable Snowmen. Godzilla must find and rescue them before it is too late.
13	13	"The Time Dragons"	December 2, 1978
The team and Godzilla are, strangely, teleported back to prehistoric times. They must find their way back to the present without disrupting the past.

=== Season 2 (1979) ===
No. overall	No. in season	Title	Original release date
14	1	"Calico Clones"	September 15, 1979
While on their way to visit an oil rig, the team is captured by a mad scientist who has the knowledge to clone people and animals. He plans to make clones of the team and Godzooky and use them to steal the oil and make him a fortune. The team has to escape and alert Godzilla.
15	2	"MicroGodzilla"	September 22, 1979
While helping the team get out of a hurricane, Godzilla wanders through a mysterious pink fog. Before long, the strange fog causes Godzilla to start shrinking. Even worse, a housefly also went through the fog, is now growing to gigantic proportions and seems to be targeting Brock and Godzooky. The others must find a way to get Godzilla and the housefly back to their normal sizes.
16	3	"Ghost Ship"	September 29, 1979
The team makes a fascinating discovery: a German U-boat from World War I trapped in an iceberg. After Godzilla frees it, the team is shocked to see the crew of the U-boat are still alive and that they also believe that the war is still going on. They manage to convince them that the war is over, but then a giant octopus attacks the U-boat, with Pete and Brock inside. Godzilla must stop the octopus before the U-boat is destroyed.
17	4	"The Beast of Storm Island"	October 6, 1979
The team becomes stranded on an island inhabited by a creature named Axor which has made the humans on the island his slaves. Axor enslaves Captain Majors, Quinn and Brock and puts them to work. Pete, Godzooky and Godzilla must find a way to destroy Axor and free the island's inhabitants.
18	5	"The City in the Clouds"	October 13, 1979
The team gets caught in a strange-looking hurricane and end up in a city in the clouds. The inhabitants explain they are there to escape an evil power dragon from their homeworld. Unfortunately, the power dragon follows them there. To make matters worse, after seeing Godzilla defeat the power dragon, the inhabitants turn hostile and want Godzilla so that they can make he and the power dragon fight and destroy each other, leaving them able to conquer Earth. The team must rescue Godzilla and keep him from falling into the wrong hands.
19	6	"The Cyborg Whale"	October 20, 1979
After a lightning strike, a cyborg whale -- a prototype submarine used for scientific purposes -- suffers a malfunction and runs out of control with Pete and Brock inside. Even worse, the whale is on a collision course with Honolulu, Hawaii. The others and Godzilla must rescue Pete and Brock and stop the whale before it destroys Honolulu.
20	7	"Valley of the Giants"	October 27, 1979
After the Calico runs aground in a river, the team discovers a valley full of giant insects. Godzilla is initially paralyzed by a giant black widow spider's bite and the entrance is sealed by a landslide. The team must find a way to escape and also prevent the insects from leaving the valley.
21	8	"Moonlode"	November 3, 1979
A mysterious creature lands on Earth from the Moon. It soon starts to wreak havoc on shipping and seems to be affecting the water currents globally. The team and Godzilla must stop it before it causes worldwide devastation.
22	9	"The Golden Guardians"	November 10, 1979
The team runs into a hostile tribe who worship giant gold statues. Things get serious when the statues seem to come to life and Godzilla is turned into a gold statue while battling them. The others must free Godzilla and convince the tribe that the statues are evil.
23	10	"The Macro-Beasts"	November 17, 1979
While investigating an ocean volcano, the team find the volcano oozing a strange liquid that causes sea creatures to turn into giants. The team and Godzilla must find a way to get the creatures back to their normal sizes before they threaten nearby shipping lanes.
24	11	"Pacific Peril"	November 24, 1979
When a new island is formed in the Pacific Ocean, the team investigates. Aftershocks from the island's formation end up trapping them in the volcano on the island, which they find is inhabited by giant lizards that eat lava. Worst of all, Godzilla is unable to reach them because he is also trapped by the seismic activity. The team must find a way to escape without Godzilla's help this time.
25	12	"Island of Doom"	December 1, 1979
When a new weather satellite is mysteriously shot down by a missile, the team traces the missile's source to an island near Australia. They find the island fortified and under the command of COBRA, a terrorist organization. The terrorists imprison the team, thinking that they are spies. A nuclear reactor on the island begins to suffer problems that threaten to cause an explosion that could destroy the island. Godzilla must rescue the team, stop COBRA, and prevent the reactor from exploding.
26	13	"The Deadly Asteroid"	December 8, 1979
A UFO lands in the Arctic and the team is sent to investigate. They discover a group of ice people from another planet named Frios that plan to destroy the Earth with an asteroid the size of the Moon. Captain Majors and Quinn are taken prisoner and Brock, Godzilla and Godzooky are frozen. Pete must free the others before the asteroid destroys the world.

== Broadcast ==
Godzilla originally aired in these following formats on NBC:

- The Godzilla Power Hour (September 9, 1978 – October 28, 1978)
- The Godzilla Super 90 (November 4, 1978 – September 1, 1979)
- Godzilla (September 8, 1979 – November 3, 1979)
- The Godzilla/Globetrotters Adventure Hour (November 10, 1979 – September 20, 1980)
- The Godzilla/Dynomutt Hour (September 27, 1980 – November 15, 1980)
- The Godzilla/Hong Kong Phooey Hour (November 22, 1980 – May 16, 1981)
- Godzilla (May 23, 1981 – September 5, 1981)

The Godzilla Power Hour consisted of half-hour episodes of Godzilla and Jana of the Jungle. A total of 13 original episodes were produced in 1978, with the first eight airing as part of The Godzilla Power Hour. On November 4, 1978, the show was expanded to 90 minutes with the addition of Jonny Quest reruns and retitled The Godzilla Super 90.

For the second season beginning on September 15, 1979, the show was separated from its package programs and aired in its own half-hour timeslot as simply Godzilla. The original plan was to keep it as part of another 90-minute arc, only it was to be paired up with episodes of The New Shmoo and The Thing. The planned title was Godzilla Meets the Shmoo and The Thing. However, these plans dissolved and the show was simply aired on its own in its own half-hour timeslot. Hanna-Barbera would pair episodes of The New Fred and Barney Show with the Shmoo and the Thing instead as both Fred and Barney Meet the Shmoo and Fred and Barney Meet the Thing. Two months later, episodes of Godzilla and The Super Globetrotters were packaged together as The Godzilla/Globetrotters Adventure Hour which ran until September 20, 1980.

On September 27, 1980, after 26 half-hour episodes, the show went into reruns and Godzilla was once again teamed up with other Hanna-Barbera characters: the first was The Godzilla/Dynomutt Hour (also appearing in this series were reruns of 1971's The Funky Phantom), which ran until November 15, 1980, followed by The Godzilla/Hong Kong Phooey Hour which ran until May 16, 1981. On May 23, the show returned to the half-hour format as Godzilla and the last regular showing aired on September 5, 1981 (to be replaced by The Smurfs, which would last three times as long as Godzilla did). Throughout the 1980s until the late 1990s, the series rested in limbo (with the exception of a limited VHS videocassette release of two episodes). Since 1993, it has been rebroadcast on TNT, Cartoon Network and Boomerang, as well as on Retro TV for a brief time on Saturday mornings between 2015 and 2016.

== Home media ==
The first 13 episodes from the first season were released on DVD, in three separate volumes titled Godzilla: The Original Animated Series. Volume 1 contains the first four episodes, Volume 2 contains the next four and Volume 3 contains the last five.

DVD title	Episodes	Company	Release date
Godzilla: The Original Animated Series—Volume 1	4	Classic Media/Sony Wonder	June 6, 2006
Godzilla: The Original Animated Series—Volume 2	4	Classic Media/Sony Wonder	June 6, 2006
Godzilla: The Original Animated Series—Volume 3	5	Classic Media/Sony Wonder	October 2, 2007

As of November 9, 2011, all episodes from the first season became available for streaming on Netflix and Hulu. The second-season episodes of Godzilla have never been officially released on any home media format. On August 9, 2021, Toho on their official Godzilla YouTube channel has released the entire series in a set of three parts per episode.

== Spoofs ==
- In response to the Y2K hype, Cartoon Network created a short – "Godzilla vs. the Y2K Bug" (1999) – in which the Calico is attacked by a giant personified, talking Y2K Bug. The Godzilla calling device turns out to be useless this time, because Captain Majors forgot to update the embedded microchip.
- Dr. Quinn Darien appeared as Dr. Gale Melody, a music expert, in the Harvey Birdman, Attorney at Law episode "Shoyu Weenie" voiced by Grey DeLisle.
