= Jeff David =

American stage, television and voice actor

- Born: September 16, 1940; Philadelphia, Pennsylvania, U.S.
- Died: March 25, 2008 (aged 67); New York, U.S.
- Occupation(s): Stage, television and voice actor

Jeff David (September 16, 1940 – March 25, 2008) was an American stage, television and voice actor.

David was born in Philadelphia, Pennsylvania. David began his acting career in stage plays in New York. He starred in the play The Lost Colony at the Waterside Theatre in Manteo, North Carolina. He also performed at the McCarter Theatre and Vivian Beaumont Theater. In the early 1960s David appeared in several seasons of the Champlain Shakespeare Festival, leaving the Lincoln Center Repertory Theater and turning down offers to appear in other New York productions to return in 1966. David was also a stage director, directed at theaters including the Pittsburgh Playhouse.

David made his screen debut in 1971 in the film Some of My Best Friends Are.... Around the same time he started doing voiceovers for television advertisements. He guest-starred in television programs including The Six Million Dollar Man, Switch, The Hardy Boys/Nancy Drew Mysteries, Hawaii Five-O and The Rockford Files. David provided additional voices for the animated television series Jana of the Jungle, and the television program Spider-Man. He also provided voices for the character Captain Carl Majors in Godzilla and the caustic robot character Crichton in the second season of the science fiction television series Buck Rogers in the 25th Century.

David died in March 2008 of a heart attack in New York, at the age of 67.
