= List of animated feature films of 1979 =

This is a list of animated feature films first released in 1979.

== List ==
Title	Country	Director	Production company	Animation technique	Format	Notes	Release date	Duration
The Adventure of Sudsakorn สุดสาคร (Sudsakhorn)	Thailand	Payut Ngaokrachang	Jirabanterng Film	Traditional	Theatrical	First Thai animated feature, and Thailand's only animated feature until Khan Kluay, released in 2006.	April 13, 1979	82 minutes
Adventures of Captain Wrongel; Приключения капитана Врунгеля (Priklyucheniya kapitana Vrungelya)	Soviet Union	David Cherkassky	Kievnauchfilm	Cutout	Traditional		September 1979	88 minutes
The Adventures of Manxmouse トンデモネズミ大活躍 (Tondemo Nezumi Daikatsuyaku)	Japan	Hiroshi Saitô	Nippon Animation; Fuji TV	Traditional	Television film	Third animated special produced for Fuji TV's "Nissei Family Special" program.	June 30, 1979	75 minutes
The Adventures of Sinbad	Australia	Richard Slapczynski	Air Programs International	Traditional	Television special	Originally aired as the 28th installment of the CBS animated anthology series Famous Classic Tales (1970–1984).	November 23, 1979	47 minutes
Adventures of the Polar Cubs 北極のムーシカミーシカ (Hokkyoku no Mushika Mishika)	Japan	Chikao Katsui	Nikkatsu Children's Movie; Mushi Production	Traditional	Theatrical		July 21, 1979	78 minutes
Age of the Great Dinosaurs 大恐竜時代 (Daikyōryū Jidai)	Japan	Hideki Takayama; Shotaro Ishinomori	Toei Animation; Nippon TV	Traditional	Television film		October 7, 1979	71 minutes
Aim for the Ace! エースをねらえ! (Ēsu o Nerae!)	Japan	Osamu Dezaki	Tokyo Movie Shinsha	Traditional	Theatrical		September 8, 1979	88 minutes
All Star Cartoon Revue	United States	?	Walt Disney Productions	Traditional	Theatrical; Compilation film	Film compiled from Disney theatrical animated shorts; originally released theatrically for overseas markets and never in the United States until March 12, 1980.	November 23, 1979	77 minutes
Animal Treasure Island 동물 보물섬 (Dongmul Bomulseom)	South Korea	Song Jeong-hun	Central Film Company	Traditional	Theatrical		December 23, 1979	63 minutes
Anne no Nikki: Anne Frank Monogatari アンネの日記 アンネ フランク物語 (Anne's Diary: The Story of Anne Frank)	Japan	Eiji Okabe	Nippon Animation; Fuji TV	Traditional	Television film		September 28, 1979	82 minutes
Black Star and the Golden Bat 검은별과 황금박쥐 (Geomeunbyeolgwa Hwanggeumbakjwi)	South Korea	Han Heonmyeong	Samyoung Film	Traditional	Theatrical		July 27, 1979	70 minutes
The Bugs Bunny/Road Runner Movie	United States	Chuck Jones; Phil Monroe	Chuck Jones Enterprises; Warner Bros. Cartoons (archive footage)	Traditional	Theatrical; Compilation film	Film compiled from theatrical animated shorts; second of six Looney Tunes compilation feature films.	September 14, 1979	98 minutes
Colargol, the Conqueror of Space; Colargol zdobywcą kosmosu	Poland	Tadeusz Wilkosz	Se-ma-for	Stop motion	Theatrical		January 20, 1979	67 minutes
Daddy-Long-Legs あしながおじさん (Ashinaga Ojisan)	Japan	Masakazu Higuchi	Tatsunoko Production; Fuji TV	Traditional	Television film	Fifth animated special produced for Fuji TV's "Nissei Family Special" program.	October 10, 1979	69 minutes
Dokkaebi Gamtu 도깨비 감투 (The Goblin's Hat)	South Korea	Bak Seung-cheol	Hanjin Industry Co., Ltd.	Traditional	Theatrical		July 28, 1979	75 minutes
Elpidio Valdés	Cuba	Juan Padrón	Instituto Cubano del Arte e Industrias Cinematográficos	Traditional	Theatrical	First Cuban animated feature.		70 minutes
Eunhahamdae Jiguho 은하함대 지구호 (Galaxy Fleet Jiguho)	South Korea	Kim Cheong-gi	Dong-A Advertising	Traditional	Theatrical		July 22, 1979	82 minutes
The Fabulous Adventures of the Legendary Baron Munchausen; Les fabuleuses aventures du légendaire Baron de Munchausen	France	Jean Image	Films Jean Image	Traditional	Theatrical		October 24, 1979	78 minutes
The Flintstones Meet Rockula and Frankenstone	United States	Ray Patterson	Hanna-Barbera Productions	Traditional	Television special		October 30, 1979	48 minutes
Fly! Spaceship Geobukseon 날아라! 우주전함 거북선	South Korea	Song Jeong-yul		Traditional	Theatrical		July 26, 1979	65 minutes
Future Boy Conan 未来少年コナン (Mirai Shōnen Konan)	Japan	Shuichi Motomashi	Nippon Animation; Toei Company (distributor)	Traditional	Theatrical	Film compiled from TV series episodes	September 15, 1979	122 minutes
Galaxy Express 999 銀河鉄道999 (Ginga Tetsudō Surī Nain)	Japan	Rintaro	Toei Animation	Traditional	Theatrical		August 4, 1979	132 minutes
Galaxy Express 999: Can You Live Like a Warrior!! 銀河鉄道999 君は戦士のように生きられるか!! (Ginga Tetsudo 999: Kimi wa Senshi no You ni Ikirareru ka!!)	Japan	Nobutaka Nishizawa; Masayuki Akehi; Shuji Iuchi	Toei Animation; Fuji TV	Traditional	Television special		October 11, 1979	130 minutes
Ganbare! Bokura no Hit and Run がんばれ!ぼくらのヒットエンドラン (Good Luck! Our Hit and Run)	Japan	Hiroyoshi Mitsunobu	Nippon Animation; Fuji TV	Traditional	Television film	First animated special produced for Fuji TV's "Nissei Family Special" program.	February 18, 1979	
Ganbare!! Tabuchi-kun!! がんばれ!!タブチくん!! (Good Luck!! Tabuchi-kun!!)	Japan	Tsutomu Shibayama	Tōkyō Movie Shinsha; Toho-Towa (distributor)	Traditional	Theatrical		November 10, 1979	95 minutes
Gancheopjamneun Ttorijanggun 간첩잡는 똘이장군 (General Ttoli)	South Korea	Kim Cheong-gi	Dong-A Advertising Co., Ltd.	Traditional	Theatrical		August 1, 1979	75 minutes
General Ttoli 3 똘이장군 제3땅굴편 (Ttoli Janggun je3ttang-gulpyeon)	South Korea	Kim Cheong-gi	Dong-A Advertising Co., Ltd.	Traditional	Theatrical		January 5, 1979	85 minutes
Gulliver's Travels	Australia	Chris Cuddington	Hanna-Barbera Australia	Traditional	Television special	Originally aired as the 27th installment of the CBS animated anthology series Famous Classic Tales (1970–1984).	November 18, 1979	60 minutes
Heidi in the Mountains アルプスの少女ハイジ (Alps no Shoujo Heidi)	Japan	Sumiko Nakao	Nippon Animation; Zuiyo Eizo; Toho-Towa (distributor)	Traditional	Theatrical	Film compiled from TV series episodes	March 17, 1979	107 minutes
Historias de amor y masacre Stories of Love and Slaughter	Spain	Jordi Amorós	Ediciones Amaika; Estudios Equip Dibujos Animados	Traditional/Live action	Theatrical		April 16, 1979	87 minutes
Jack Frost	United States; Japan	Jules Bass; Arthur Rankin Jr.	Rankin/Bass; Video Tokyo Production	Stop motion	Television special		December 13, 1979	48 minutes
The Lion, the Witch and the Wardrobe	United Kingdom; United States	Bill Melendez	Children's Television Workshop; Bill Melendez Productions; Distinguished Productions; Episcopal Radio-TV Foundation	Traditional	Television film		April 1–2, 1979	95 minutes
The Little Convict	Australia	Yoram Gross	Yoram Gross Films Studio; Hoyts	Traditional / Live action	Theatrical; Live-action animated film		December 20, 1979	80 minutes
Little Orbit the Astrodog and the Screechers from Outer Space; Pluk, naufragé de l'espace	France	Jean Image	Films Jean Image	Traditional	Theatrical		March 14, 1979	74 minutes
Lupin III: The Castle of Cagliostro ルパン三世 カリオストロの城 (Rupan Sansei: Kariosutoro no Shiro)	Japan	Hayao Miyazaki	Tokyo Movie Shinsha	Traditional	Theatrical	First anime feature film to be directed by Hayao Miyazaki.	December 15, 1979	100 minutes
Lupin the Thief: Enigma of the 813 怪盗ルパン 813の謎 (Kaitō Lupin: 813 no Nazo)	Japan	Hiroshi Sasagawa	Tatsunoko Production; Fuji TV	Traditional	Television film		May 5, 1979	80 minutes
Maegami Tarou まえがみ太郎 (Preface Taro)	Japan	Hiroshi Saitô	Nippon Animation; Fuji TV	Traditional	Television film	Second animated special produced for Fuji TV's "Nissei Family Special" program.	April 29, 1979	75 minutes
Les Misérables ジャン・バルジャン物語 (Jean Valjean Monogatari)	Japan	Takashi Kuoka	Toei Animation; Fuji TV	Traditional	Television film	Fourth animated special produced for Fuji TV's "Nissei Family Special" program.	September 15, 1979	69 minutes
Nutcracker Fantasy くるみ割り人形 (Kurumiwari Ningyō)	Japan	Takeo Nakamura	Sanrio; Video Tokyo Production	Stop motion	Theatrical		March 3, 1979	95 minutes
Prince Nezha's Triumph Against the Dragon King a. k. a. Nezha Conquers the Dragon King 哪吒闹海 (Nezha nao hai)	China	Yan Dingxian; Wang Shuchen; Xu Jingda	Shanghai Animation Film Studio	Traditional	Theatrical		May 19, 1979	65 minutes
Proszę słonia Please, Mr. Elephant	Poland	Witold Giersz	Studio Miniatur Filmowych	Traditional	Theatrical		April 1979	63 minutes
The Revolt of the Thralls; Trællenes oprør	Denmark	Jannik Hastrup	Dansk Tegnefilm; Traellenes Boern	Traditional	Theatrical	Film compiled from TV series episodes	October 8, 1979	90 minutes
Rudolph and Frosty's Christmas in July	United States; Japan	Jules Bass; Arthur Rankin Jr.	Rankin/Bass; Video Tokyo Production	Stop motion	Television film		November 25, 1979	98 minutes
Scooby Goes Hollywood	United States	Ray Patterson	Hanna-Barbera Productions	Traditional	Television special		December 23, 1979	49 minutes
Seven Brothers; Seitsemän veljestä	Finland	Riitta Nelimarkka; Jaakko Seeck	Nelimarkka/Seeck Productions	Traditional	Theatrical	First Finnish animated feature.	October 20, 1979	87 minutes
SpaceBoy Cache 우주소년 캐시 (Ujusonyeon kaesi)	South Korea	Bak Seung-cheol	Samdo Film	Traditional	Theatrical		July 27, 1979	60 minutes
Star Wars with Sun Wukong 손오공과 별들의 전쟁 (Sonogonggwa byeoldeurui-ro jeonjaeng)	South Korea	Han Heon-myeong	Samdo Film Co., Ltd.	Traditional	Theatrical		July 21, 1979	67 minutes
Starland Trio 별나라 삼총사 (Byeollara Samchongsa)	South Korea	Lim Jung-kyu	Sunwoo Production Co., Ltd.	Traditional	Theatrical	First installment of the Dreamland Cartoon Theater series.	July 21, 1979	70 minutes
Taegeuksonyeon Huin Doksuri 태극소년 흰 독수리 (White Eagle, the Taegeuk Boy)	South Korea	Kim Tae-jong	Sejong Culture Corporation	Traditional	Theatrical		July 15, 1979	75 minutes
Taro the Dragon Boy 龍の子太郎 (Tatsu no ko Tarō)	Japan	Kiriro Urayama; Peter Fernandez	Toei Animation	Traditional	Theatrical		March 17, 1979	75 minutes
Tomorrow's Eleven あしたの勇者たち (Ashita no Eleven-tachi)	Japan	Kozo Morishita	Toei Animation; Nippon TV	Traditional	Television film		January 7, 1979	70 minutes
Triton of the Sea 海のトリトン (Umi no Toriton)	Japan	Kazunori Tanahashi	Office Academy; Toei Company (distributor)	Traditional	Theatrical	Film compiled from TV series episodes	March 17, 1979	74 minutes
Ubu et la Grande Gidouille; Ubu and the Great Gidouille	France	Jan Lenica	Les Films Armorial; Magic Film	Cutout	Theatrical		?	80 minutes
Uju Heukgisa 우주 흑기사 (The Black Knight of the Universe)	South Korea	Bak Jong-hui	Geumryong Film Works	Traditional	Theatrical		December 22, 1979	75 minutes
Undersea Super Train: Marine Express 海底超特急 マリン・エクスプレス (Kaitei Chōtokkyū Marin Ekusupuresu)	Japan	Satoshi Dezaki	Tezuka Productions; Nippon TV	Traditional	Television film	Second animated special produced for Nippon TV's 24 Hour TV "Love Saves the Earth" telethon.	August 26, 1979	91 minutes
Yamato: The New Voyage 宇宙戦艦ヤマト 新たなる旅立ち (Uchū Senkan Yamato: Aratanaru Tabidachi)	Japan	Leiji Matsumoto	Academy Productions; Fuji TV	Traditional	Television film	Third feature film in the Space Battleship Yamato series and the only installment to be made exclusively for television; however, it was released in theaters on March 14, 1981.	July 14, 1979	95 minutes
Yakyū-kyō no Uta: Kita no Ookami, Minami no Tora 野球狂の詩 北の狼南の虎 (Poetry of Baseball Enthusiasts: Wolf of the North, Tiger of the South)	Japan	Eiji Okabe	Nippon Animation	Traditional	Theatrical	Compilation film of episodes 13 ("Kita no Ookami, Minami no Tora (Zenpen)") and 14 ("Kita no Ookami, Minami no Tora (Kouhen)") respectively from the animated television series based on the manga of the same name that ran from December 23, 1977 to March 26, 1979 for a total of 25 episodes.	September 15, 1979	90 minutes

== Highest-grossing animated films of the year ==
Rank	Title	Studio	Distributor rentals	Ref
1	Galaxy Express 999	Toei Animation	¥1,650,000,000	
2	Lupin III: The Castle of Cagliostro	Tokyo Movie Shinsha	¥600,000,000	

== See also ==
- List of animated television series of 1979
