= List of Hana no Ko Lunlun episodes =

This article is a list of the episodes of Hana no Ko Lunlun, an anime series based on the manga series by the same name. The original story was created by Shiro Jinbo. The anime adaptation is created by Toei Animation. The series began airing in Japan on February 9, 1979, on the TV Asahi network.

No.	Title	Original release date
1	"The Mysterious Visitor"; Transliteration: "Fushigi na Hōmonsha" (Japanese: ふしぎな訪問者)	February 9, 1979
2	"Stormy Spring has Called a Dream"; Transliteration: "Haru no Arashi ga Yonda Yume" (Japanese: 春の嵐が呼んだ夢)	February 16, 1979
3	"The Blooming 7-Color Flowers in the Old Castle"; Transliteration: "Kojō ni Saku Nanairo no Hana" (Japanese: 古城に咲く七色の花)	February 23, 1979
4	"The Older Sister is the Rose Queen"; Transliteration: "Onēchan wa Bara no Joō" (Japanese: お姉ちゃんはバラの女王)	March 2, 1979
5	"Flowerless Town"; Transliteration: "Hana no Nai Machi" (Japanese: 花のない町)	March 9, 1979
6	"The Grandmother's Grape Garden"; Transliteration: "Budōbatake no Obāchan" (Japanese: ぶどう畑のお婆ちゃん)	March 16, 1979
7	"Blooming Flowers to Pierney"; Transliteration: "Pirenē ni Saku Hana" (Japanese: ピレネーに咲く花)	March 23, 1979
8	"Small Columbus's Dream"; Transliteration: "Chiisana Koronbusu no Yume" (Japanese: 小さなコロンブスの夢)	March 30, 1979
9	"The Sunset of Majorca Island"; Transliteration: "Majoruka-tō no Yūyake" (Japanese: マジョルカ島の夕焼け)	April 6, 1979
10	"Madrid's Lovely Small Box"; Transliteration: "Madoriddo no Ai no Kobako" (Japanese: マドリッドの愛の小箱)	April 20, 1979
11	"A Matador's Friendship"; Transliteration: "Yūjō no Tōgyūshi" (Japanese: 友情の闘牛士)	April 27, 1979
12	"Andalusia Girl's Wish"; Transliteration: "Andarushia no Shōjo no Negai" (Japanese: アンダルシアの少女の願い)	May 4, 1979
13	"Loading a Freighter is Detested"; Transliteration: "Nikushimi o Noseta Kamotsusen" (Japanese: 憎しみを乗せた貨物船)	May 18, 1979
14	"Homesick Fast Express"; Transliteration: "Hōmushikku Tokkyū" (Japanese: ホームシック特急)	May 25, 1979
15	"The Heroine of the Flowery Town"; Transliteration: "Hana no Machi no Hiroin" (Japanese: 花の街のヒロイン)	June 1, 1979
16	"Cinderella's Wooden Shoes"; Transliteration: "Kigutsu no Shinderera" (Japanese: 木靴のシンデレラ)	June 8, 1979
17	"Flower Thief's Windmill"; Transliteration: "Fūshagoya no Hana Dorobō" (Japanese: 風車小屋の花どろぼう)	June 15, 1979
18	"Fickleness One's Love"; Transliteration: "Utsurigi na Koikokoro" (Japanese: 移り気な恋心)	June 22, 1979
19	"Rhine River's Tour Date"; Transliteration: "Rain-gawa no Meguri Ai" (Japanese: ライン河のめぐり逢い)	June 29, 1979
20	"See the Hills of the Old Castle"; Transliteration: "Kojō no Mieru Oka" (Japanese: 古城の見える丘)	July 6, 1979
21	"Bremen's Naughty Boy"; Transliteration: "Burēmen no Wanpaku Bōya" (Japanese: ブレーメンのわんぱく坊や)	July 13, 1979
22	"The tender Mother of the Inside Drawing"; Transliteration: "E no Naka no Yasashī Haha" (Japanese: 絵の中のやさしい母)	July 20, 1979
23	"The Knight's Illusion White Horse"; Transliteration: "Maboroshi no Hakuba no Kishi" (Japanese: 幻の白馬の騎士)	July 27, 1979
24	"The Miracle Flower Key"; Transliteration: "Kiseki no Hana no Kagi" (Japanese: 奇跡の花の鍵)	August 3, 1979
25	"The Knife boy of the Lake Shore"; Transliteration: "Naifu o Motta Kohan no Shōnen" (Japanese: ナイフを持った湖畔の少年)	August 10, 1979
26	"The Tear's Stained Love in the Mud"; Transliteration: "Doro ni Mamireta Ai no Namida" (Japanese: 泥にまみれた愛の涙)	August 17, 1979
27	"The Coach is Studying Poor"; Transliteration: "Kateikyōshi wa Benkyō ga Nigate" (Japanese: 家庭教師は勉強が苦手)	August 24, 1979
28	"Robbing Torn Letter"; Transliteration: "Ubawareta Tegami" (Japanese: 奪われた手紙)	September 7, 1979
29	"Here I am Drifting Inside of the Blimp"; Transliteration: "Hikōsen Tadaima Hyōryūchū" (Japanese: 飛行船ただいま漂流中)	September 14, 1979
30	"The Merry-Go-Round of Midnight"; Transliteration: "Mayonaka no Kaitenmokuba" (Japanese: 真夜中の回転木馬)	September 21, 1979
31	"The Viking's Treasure"; Transliteration: "Vaikingu no Takaramono" (Japanese: ヴァイキングの宝物)	September 28, 1979
32	"The Cub in the Rage-Flying Trap"; Transliteration: "Wana ni Kakatta Koguma" (Japanese: 罠にかかった子熊)	October 5, 1979
33	"The Childhood Friend's Land of the White Night"; Transliteration: "Byakuya no Kuni no Osananajimi" (Japanese: 白夜の国の幼なじみ)	October 12, 1979
34	"The Siblings from Lapland"; Transliteration: "Rappurando no Kyōdai" (Japanese: ラップランドの兄弟)	October 19, 1979
35	"Dangerous Inviting Pendant"; Transliteration: "Kiken o Maneku Pendanto" (Japanese: 危険を招くペンダント)	October 26, 1979
36	"Emergency Landing's Reunion"; Transliteration: "Saikai no Kinkyūchakuriku" (Japanese: 再会の緊急着陸)	November 2, 1979
37	"Eccentric Doctor's Mansion"; Transliteration: "Kijin Hakase no Yakata" (Japanese: 奇人博士の館)	November 9, 1979
38	"Pick up a Puppy"; Transliteration: "Hirotta Koinu" (Japanese: 拾った子犬)	November 16, 1979
39	"The One Way Ticket to Morocco"; Transliteration: "Morokko e no Katamichikippu" (Japanese: モロッコへの片道切符)	November 23, 1979
40	"Fantasia's Gunshot"; Transliteration: "Fantajia no Jūsei" (Japanese: ファンタジアの銃声)	November 30, 1979
41	"The Egyptian Queen's Ring"; Transliteration: "Ejiputo Joō no Yubiwa" (Japanese: エジプト女王の指輪)	December 7, 1979
42	"Sicily's Fugitive"; Transliteration: "Shichiria no Tōbōsha" (Japanese: シチリアの逃亡者)	December 14, 1979
43	"The Dangerous Treasure"; Transliteration: "Kiken na Takaramono" (Japanese: 危険な宝もの)	December 21, 1979
44	"A Dancing Single Photo in the Pollen Winds"; Transliteration: "Kabun Kaze ni matta Ichimai no Shashin" (Japanese: 花粉風に舞った一枚の写真)	December 28, 1979
45	"Tres Bien's Spring Oath"; Transliteration: "Torebi no Izumi no Chikai" (Japanese: トレビの泉の誓い)	January 4, 1980
46	"Get out of Love, Florence"; Transliteration: "Kaere Ai no Firentse" (Japanese: 帰れ愛のフィレンツェ)	January 11, 1980
47	"Stealing Rare Flower's Key"; Transliteration: "Nusumareta Hana no Kagi" (Japanese: 盗まれた花の鍵)	January 18, 1980
48	"Sanremo's Yearning Person"; Transliteration: "San Remo no Bojō no Hito" (Japanese: サン·レモの慕情のひと)	January 25, 1980
49	"The 7-Color Flower that Invites a Rainbow"; Transliteration: "Niji no Maneku Nanairo no Hana" (Japanese: 虹を招く七色の花)	February 1, 1980
50	"The Happiness full of Flowers"; Transliteration: "Hana Ippai no Shiawase o" (Japanese: 花いっぱいの幸せを)	February 8, 1980
