= 1979–80 United States network television schedule (late night) =

These are the late-night schedules for the three U.S. television networks during the 1979–80 season. All times are Eastern and Pacific.

PBS is not included, as member television stations had local flexibility with most of their schedules, and broadcast times for network shows might have varied. ABC and CBS are not included on the weekend schedules because those networks did not offer late-night programming on the weekend.

Talk/Variety shows are highlighted in yellow, Local News & Programs are highlighted in white.

== Monday-Friday ==
-		11:00 PM	11:30 PM	12:00 AM	12:30 AM	1:00 AM	1:30 AM	2:00 AM	2:30 AM	3:00 AM	3:30 AM	4:00 AM	4:30 AM	5:00 AM	5:30 AM
ABC	Fall	Local	ABC Late Night										Local or sign off
ABC	November	Local	The Iran Crisis: America Held Hostage	ABC Late Night			Local or sign off
ABC	Spring	Local	Nightline* (Mon.-Thur.)	ABC Late Night (Mon.-Thur.)/Fridays (Fri, 11:30-12:40)			Local or sign off
CBS		local programming	The CBS Late Movie				Local or sign off
NBC		local programming	The Tonight Show Starring Johnny Carson			The Tomorrow Show (to 2:00; Mon.-Thur.)/The Midnight Special (Fri)			local programming or sign off

- formerly The Iran Crisis: America Held Hostage

== Saturday ==
-	11:00 PM	11:30 PM	12:00 AM	12:30 AM	1:00 AM	1:30 AM	2:00 AM	2:30 AM	3:00 AM	3:30 AM	4:00 AM	4:30 AM	5:00 AM	5:30 AM
NBC	local programming	Saturday Night Live			local programming or sign off

== Sunday ==
-	11:00 PM	11:30 PM	12:00 AM	12:30 AM	1:00 AM	1:30 AM	2:00 AM	2:30 AM	3:00 AM	3:30 AM	4:00 AM	4:30 AM	5:00 AM	5:30 AM
NBC	local programming	NBC Late Night Movie				local programming or sign off

== By network ==
=== ABC ===
Returning Series

- ABC Late Night

New Series

- Fridays
- The Iran Crisis: America Held Hostage

=== CBS ===
Returning Series

- The CBS Late Movie

=== NBC ===
Returning Series

- The Midnight Special
- NBC Late Night Movie
- Saturday Night Live
- The Tomorrow Show
- The Tonight Show Starring Johnny Carson
