= Jana of the Jungle =

American animated television series

- Genre: Adventure
- Created by: Doug Wildey
- Directed by: Ray Patterson; Carl Urbano
- Voices of: B.J. Ward; Michael Bell; Ted Cassidy
- Theme music composer: Hoyt Curtin
- Country of origin: United States
- Original language: English
- No. of episodes: 13

Production
- Executive producers: William Hanna; Joseph Barbera
- Producer: Doug Wildey
- Running time: 30 minutes
- Production company: Hanna-Barbera Productions

Original release
- Network: NBC
- Release: September 9 – December 2, 1978

Related
- The Godzilla Power Hour

Jana of the Jungle is an American animated television series created by comic strip artist Doug Wildey and produced by Hanna-Barbera Productions which aired on NBC from September 9 to December 2, 1978. It was originally broadcast as a half-hour segment of The Godzilla Power Hour (1978) and its later expanded form The Godzilla Super 90 (1978–79).

== Overview ==
Jana (voiced by B.J. Ward) is essentially a female version of Tarzan who traveled to the rain forests of South America in search of her lost father. Her father vanished in a boating accident when she was still a child 10 years prior to the series, but the introduction shows that he survived. She is very beautiful, has long blonde hair, wears a dress made of animal skin and a necklace which doubles as a throwable weapon and makes a high-pitched resonating sound when thrown, given to her by her father before the boating accident. She also has a yell that is a slightly altered version of Tarzan’s which she uses to call many types of animals.

Besides her animal friends (Ghost, a sleek white jaguar and Tico, a pesky water opossum), Jana has two human friends: Dr. Ben Cooper (voiced by Michael Bell, who would also work with B.J. Ward on various other animated series in later years), a young wildlife biologist who maintained the preserve started by Jana's father and helped in her continuing search for her father; and Montaro (voiced by Ted Cassidy), a descendant of a lost warrior tribe armed with a supernatural weapon known as the Staff of Power that can cause earthquake shockwaves when it strikes the ground. Montaro rescued Jana from the boating accident in which her father disappeared.

These are some of the jungle animals Jana called to, many for help:

- Croco, a crocodile
- Kachi, a monkey
- Peechu, birds (parrots, macaws)
- Nacto, a bat
- Slithor, a snake

== Episodes ==
No.	Title	Airdate
1	"The Golden Idol of the Gorgas"	September 9, 1978
Two people come to the jungle and ask Jana for help claiming their son is lost in risky territory.
2	"Katuchi Danger"	September 16, 1978
A plane carrying medical supplies crashes in the "valley of the lost" where legend says live the Katuchi, a dangerous tribe of ape-men.
3	"The Cordillera Volcano"	September 23, 1978
When a volcano erupts, Jana has to lead endangered miners to protection.
4	"The Animal Snatchers"	September 30, 1978
A film crew arrives in the Amazon to make a movie about Jana and her friends, but they are actually poachers who want to capture her white jaguar, Ghost.
5	"The Renegade"	October 7, 1978
Jana suspects there may be another white jaguar loose in the jungle when Ghost is accused of attacking people and animals for no reason.
6	"Rogue Elephant"	October 14, 1978
A train wreck frees a zoo elephant into the jungle. Jana must protect the people of a local village from the scared animal, and it from them.
7	"The Prisoner"	October 21, 1978
Jana enters a native village, and meets a man who just might be her missing father.
8	"The Invaders"	October 28, 1978
Two dam workers unknowingly start a battle between wolves and pumas.
9	"Dangerous Cargo"	November 4, 1978
When a fire breaks out at an oil rig, Mr. Stern tells Jana and Montaro that since there's no dynamite to extinguish the blaze, they'll have to transport nitroglycerin instead-a risky procedure.
10	"The Sting of the Tarantula"	November 11, 1978
Montaro is stung by a tarantula and, delirious from his fever, he thinks that Jana and Ben are his opponents.
11	"Countdown"	November 18, 1978
A military plane crashes in the jungle and its freight, a powerful bomb, falls into the hands of an isolated tribe. Jana must deal with both the bomb, which is counting down, and an active volcano.
12	"Suspicion"	November 25, 1978
Ben is wrongfully blamed by a tribe of stealing a black pearl, but it was actually an inside job committed by a fellow tribesman.
13	"Race for Life"	December 2, 1978
Ben is forcibly captured by the Amazoni, a tribe of giant female warriors. In order to free him, Jana must race against the Amazoni's chief of the guard and win.

== Production ==
According to animator, Will Meugniot, Jana of the Jungle had actually begun life as an animated version of Sheena, Queen of the Jungle created by Will Eisner and Jerry Iger. Doug Wildey stated Hanna-Barbera began development of the Sheena animated series to be paired with their upcoming Godzilla under the impression that the character had fallen into the public domain. When the rights holders learned of the series and approached Hanna-Barbera, they asked for a large amount of money due to Hanna-Barbera's position of already having developed the series putting them in a disadvantaged bargaining position. In order to salvage the series, Wildey hastily threw together the Jana of the Jungle pitch. It is speculated that Wildey took inspiration for the salvage pitch from Jann of the Jungle, a jungle girl series that was published by Atlas Comics when Wildey worked there in the 1950s. As NBC was more interested in catering to a male rather than female demographic, Jana of the Jungle had its presence downplayed when it was paired with Godzilla during broadcast.

== Broadcast history ==
Jana of the Jungle was originally broadcast in these following formats on NBC:

- The Godzilla Power Hour (September 9, 1978 – October 28, 1978, NBC Saturday 9:30-10:30 AM)
- The Godzilla Super 90 (November 4, 1978 – September 1, 1979, NBC Saturday 9:00-10:30 AM)

A total of 13 original episodes of Jana of the Jungle were produced in 1978, with the first eight broadcast as part of the second half of The Godzilla Power Hour from September 9 to October 28. In November 1978, when The Godzilla Power Hour was expanded to 90 minutes (with the addition of Jonny Quest reruns) and re-titled The Godzilla Super 90, the five remaining episodes of Jana of the Jungle continued on this new format until December 2. The Jana character also made a cameo appearance piloting a rocket-car in an episode of Yogi's Space Race in 1978.

Jana of the Jungle officially resurfaced in January 1984 (preview on December 18, 1983) as part of USA Cartoon Express with the last recorded airing of the program on this or any other network being March 22, 1991. The show has not been aired on American television since at least 1994, when its five-year association with The Program Exchange came to an end. This is one of the very few Hanna-Barbera series that has yet to be seen on either Cartoon Network or Boomerang; however, one of the episodes, "The Cordillera Volcano", was available for a limited time on WB's Hanna-Barbera online stream.

== Voices ==
- B.J. Ward as Jana
- Michael Bell as Dr. Ben Cooper
- Ted Cassidy as Montaro

=== Additional voices ===
- Marlene Aragon
- Bill Boyett
- Jeff David
- Virginia Eilea
- Ron Feinberg
- Jane James
- Casey Kasem
- Ross Martin
- Vic Perrin
- Barney Phillips
- Michael Rye
- Bill Woodson

== Jana in comic books ==
In January 2007, Dynamite Entertainment launched a comic book, with plot by Frank Cho and script by Doug Murray, called Jungle Girl, featuring a blond female character called Jana. She is a Tarzan-esque heroine that lives in some kind of "Lost World", a jungle inhabited by strange creatures including dinosaurs and cavemen. While bearing the same name and taking place in a jungle setting, the Cho/Murray comic character is not connected with the TV series, and wears a skimpier outfit.
