= Shmoo =

Fictional cartoon species by Al Capp

Publication information
- First appearance: 1948
- Created by: Al Capp

The shmoo (plural: shmoos, also shmoon) is a fictional cartoon creature created by Al Capp, which first appeared in the comic strip Li'l Abner on August 31, 1948. Shmoos are described as cute bowling-pin-shaped creatures that breed exponentially, consume nothing, and eagerly provide everything that humankind wants. They are said to love humans so much they live only to serve them, producing milk (bottled) and eggs (packaged). If glanced at with hunger, they die of sheer happiness to be eaten, and taste like pork when roasted, chicken when fried, and steak when broiled.

The character created a fad that lasted into the 1950s, including merchandise, songs, fan clubs, and appearances on magazine covers. The parable of the shmoo has been interpreted in many different ways, both at the time and in later analysis.

== Origins ==
Al Capp offered his version of the origin of the Shmoo in a wryly satirical article, "I Don't Like Shmoos", in Cosmopolitan (June 1949):

I was driving from New York City to my farm in New Hampshire. The top of my car was down, and on either side of me I could see the lush and lovely New England countryside... It was the good earth at its generous summertime best, offering gifts to all. And the thought that came to me was this: Here we have this great and good and generous thing—the Earth. It's eager to give us everything we need. All we have to do is just let it alone, just be happy with it.

Cartoonists don't think like people. They think in pictures. Little pictures that will fit into a comic strip. And so, in my mind, I reduced the Earth... down to the size of a small critter that would fit into the Li'l Abner strip—and it came out a Shmoo... I didn't have any message—except that it's good to be alive. The Shmoo didn't have any social significance; it is simply a juicy li'l critter that gives milk and lays eggs... When you look at one as though you'd like to eat it, it dies of sheer ecstasy. And if one really loves you, it'll lay you a cheesecake—although this is quite a strain on its li'l innards...

I thought it was a perfectly ordinary little story, but when it appeared in newspapers, all hell broke loose! Life, in an editorial, hailed the Shmoo as the very symbol and spirit of free enterprise. Time said I'd invented a new era of enlightened management-employee relationship, (they called it Capp-italism). The Daily Worker cussed me out as a Tool of the Bosses, and denounced the Shmoo as the Opium of the Masses...

Capp introduced many other allegorical creatures in Li'l Abner over the years—including Bald Iggles, Kigmies, Nogoodniks, Mimikniks, the Money Ha-Ha, Shminks, Abominable Snow-Hams, Gobbleglops, Shtunks and Bashful Bulganiks, among others. Each one highlighted another disquieting facet of human nature—but none have ever had quite the same cultural impact as the Shmoo. According to publisher Denis Kitchen: "For the rest of his career Capp got countless letters [from] people begging him to bring the Shmoo back. Periodically he would do it but each time it ended the same way—with the Shmoo being too good for humanity, and he had to essentially exterminate them again. But there was always one or two who would survive for future plot twists..."

=== Etymology ===
The origin of Capp's word "shmoo" has been the subject of linguistic consideration by scholars for decades. Academics Arthur Asa Berger and Allan H. Orrick of Johns Hopkins University speculated by that shmoo was a thinly veiled phallic symbol, and that the name derives from Yiddish schmuck (schmo) meaning ‘male genitalia’ or a ‘fool, contemptuous person’. Even prior to Berger and Orrick's explanation, Thomas Pyles at University of Florida had favored the shmuck etymology over the derivation from the Yiddish schmu (‘profit’), suggested by Leo Spitzer. (Note: Pyles assumed the cartoonist had made an unconscious association with the expletive term, and Spitze also suggested "Al Kapp" (sic.) "may not be [have been] consciously aware" when his mind evoked the Yiddish word schmu. Orrick, however, sides with the findings of the New York State Joint Legislative that this was a conscious choice of word. Orrick points to one cartoon drawing in which the Shmoo is depicted in a suggestive (phallic) pose, and which bears the caption "Benedick" (italics is his).)

Spitzer noted the shmoo's providential characteristics (providing eggs and milk) in arguing his hypothesis, further explaining that in Yiddish schmu specifically connoted "illicit profit", and that the word also giving rise to term schmus ‘tale, gossip’, whose verb form schmusen or ‘shmoosing’ (schmooze) has become familiar even to non-Jews. Lilian Mermin Feinsilver assessed this association with shmu ‘illicit profit’ as "pertinent", together with the observation that shmue was a taboo Yiddish term for the uterus.

It is one of many Yiddish slang variations that would find their way into Li'l Abner. Revealing an important key to the story, Al Capp wrote that the Shmoo metaphorically represented the limitless bounty of the Earth in all its richness—in essence, Mother Nature herself. In Li'l Abner's words, "Shmoos hain't make believe. The hull [whole] earth is one!!"

== Analysis ==
The Shmoo, any literate person must know, was one of history's most brilliant utopian satires.

— The Baltimore Sun, 2002

"Capp is at his allegorical best in the epics of the Shmoos, and later, the Kigmies", wrote comic strip historian Jerry Robinson "Shmoos are the world's most amiable creatures, supplying all man's needs. Like a fertility myth gone berserk, they reproduced so prodigiously they threatened to wreck the economy"—if not western civilization as we know it, and ultimately society itself.

Superficially, the Shmoo story concerns a cuddly creature that desires nothing more than to be a boon to humans. Although initially Capp denied or avoided discussion of any satirical intentions ("If the Shmoo fits", he proclaimed, "wear it!"), he was widely seen to be using clever subtext. The story has social, ethical, and philosophical implications that continue to invite analysis into the 21st Century. During the remainder of his life, Capp was seldom interviewed without reference to the nature of the Shmoo story.

The mythic tale ends on a deliberately ironic note. Shmoos are officially declared a menace, and systematically hunted down and slaughtered—because they were deemed "bad for business". The much-copied story line was a parable that was interpreted in many different ways at the outset of the Cold War. Al Capp was even invited to go on a radio show to debate socialist Norman Thomas on the effect of the Shmoo on modern capitalism.

"After it came out both the left and the right attacked the Shmoo", according to publisher Denis Kitchen. "Communists thought he was making fun of socialism and Marxism. The right wing thought he was making fun of capitalism and the American way. Capp caught flak from both sides. For him it was an apolitical morality tale about human nature... I think [the Shmoo] was one of those bursts of genius. He was a genius, there's no question about that."

== Reception ==
The Shmoo inspired hundreds of "Shmoo clubs" all over North America. College students—who had made Capp's invented idea of the Sadie Hawkins dance a universally adopted tradition—flocked to the Shmoo as well. One school, the University of Bridgeport, even launched the "American Society for the Advancement of the Shmoo" in early 1949.

== Licensing history ==
Of course, it was merchandised to death. I think they even had shmoo toilet seats.

— Al Capp, Cartoonist PROfiles #37, March 1978

An unexpected—and virtually unprecedented—postwar merchandising phenomenon followed Capp's introduction of the Shmoo in Li'l Abner. As in the strip, shmoos suddenly appeared to be everywhere in 1949 and 1950—including a Time cover story. They also garnered nearly a full page of coverage (under "Economics") in the Time International section. Major articles also ran in Newsweek, Life, The New Republic, and countless other publications and newspapers. Virtually overnight, as a Life headline put it, "The U.S. Becomes Shmoo-Struck!"

=== Toys and consumer products ===
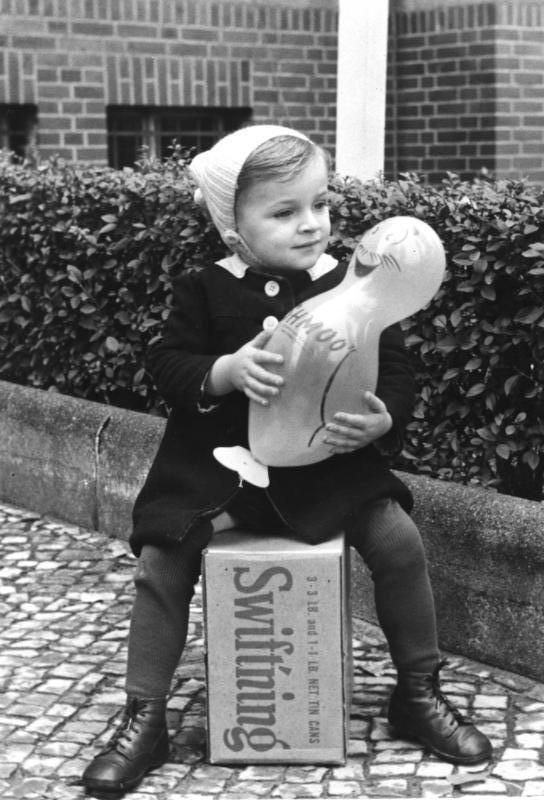
A child in West Berlin holding a Shmoo-shaped balloon and sitting on a CARE Package (October 1948)

Shmoo dolls, clocks, watches, jewelry, earmuffs, wallpaper, fishing lures, air fresheners, soap, ice cream, balloons, ashtrays, toys, games, Halloween masks, salt and pepper shakers, decals, pinbacks, tumblers, coin banks, greeting cards, planters, neckties, suspenders, belts, curtains, fountain pens, and other shmoo paraphernalia were produced. A garment factory in Baltimore turned out a whole line of shmoo apparel, including "Shmooveralls". In 1948, people danced to the Shmoo Rhumba and the Shmoo Polka. The Shmoo briefly entered everyday language through such phrases as "What's Shmoo?" and "Happy Shmoo Year!"

Close to a hundred licensed shmoo products from 75 different manufacturers were produced in less than a year, some of which sold five million units each. In a single year, shmoo merchandise generated more than $25 million in sales in 1948 dollars (equivalent to $335 million in 2025).

There had never previously been anything like it. Comparisons to contemporary cultural phenomena are inevitable. But modern crazes are almost always due to massive marketing campaigns by large media corporations, and are generally aimed at the youth market. The Shmoo phenomenon arose immediately, spontaneously and solely from cartoonist Al Capp's daily comic strip—and it appealed widely to Americans of all ages. Forty million people read the original 1948 Shmoo story, and Capp's already considerable readership roughly doubled following the overwhelming success of the Shmoo...

— Denis Kitchen

The Shmoo was so popular it even replaced Walt Disney's Mickey Mouse as the face of the Children's Savings Bond, issued by the U.S. Treasury Department in 1949. The valid document was colorfully illustrated with Capp's character, and promoted by the Federal Government of the United States with a $16 million advertising campaign budget. According to one article at the time, the Shmoo showed "Thrift, loyalty, trust, duty, truth, and common cents [that] add up to aid to his nation". Al Capp accompanied President Harry S. Truman at the bond's unveiling ceremony.

=== Comic books and reprints ===
The Life and Times of the Shmoo (1948), a paperback collection of the original sequence, was a bestseller for Simon & Schuster and became the first cartoon book to achieve serious literary attention. Distributed to small town magazine racks, it sold 700,000 copies in its first year of publication alone. It was reviewed coast to coast alongside Dwight Eisenhower's Crusade in Europe (the other big publication at the time).

The original book and its sequel, The Return of the Shmoo (1959), have been collected in print many times since—most recently in 2002—always to high sales figures.

There was also a separate line of comic books, Al Capp's Shmoo Comics (featuring Washable Jones), published by the Capp family-owned Toby Press. Comics historian and Li'l Abner expert Denis Kitchen recently edited a complete collection of all five original Shmoo Comics, from 1949 and 1950. The book was published by Dark Horse Comics in 2008. Kitchen edited a second Shmoo-related volume for Dark Horse in 2011, on the history of the character in newspaper strips, collectibles, and memorabilia.

=== Recordings and sheet music ===
Recordings and published sheet music related to the Shmoos include:

Shmoo 78rpm disc

- The Shmoo Sings with Earl Rogers (1948) 78 rpm / Allegro
- The Shmoo Club b/w The Shmoo Is Clean, the Shmoo Is Neat with Gerald Marks and Justin Stone (1949) 78 rpm / Music You Enjoy, Inc.
- The Snuggable, Huggable Shmoo b/w The Shmoo Doesn't Cost a Cent with Gerald Marks and Justin Stone (1949) 78 rpm / Music You Enjoy, Inc.
- Shmoo Lesson b/w A Shmoo Can Do Most Anything with Gerald Marks and Justin Stone (1949) 78 rpm / Music You Enjoy, Inc.
- The Shmoo Song (1948) Composed by Jule Styne & John Jacob Loeb / Harvey Music Corp.
- Shmoo Songs (1949) Composed by Gerald Marks / Bristol Music Corp.
- The Kigmy Song (1949) Composed by Joe Rosenield & Fay Tishman / Town and Country Music Co.

=== Animation and puppetry ===
Originally, shmoos were meant to be included in the 1956 Broadway Li'l Abner musical, employing stage puppetry. Reportedly, the idea was abandoned in the development stage by the producers, however, for reasons of practicality. A variation of the character had appeared earlier as a marionette puppet on television. "Shmoozer", a talking shmoo with an anthropomorphic human body, was a recurring sidekick character on Fearless Fosdick, a short-lived puppet series that aired on NBC-TV in 1952.

After Capp's death in 1979, the Shmoo gained its own animated series as part of Fred and Barney Meet the Shmoo, which consisted of reruns of The New Fred and Barney Show mixed with the Shmoo's own cartoons; despite the title the two sets of characters didn't directly "meet" within the show. The characters did meet, however, in the early 1980s Flintstones spin-off The Flintstone Comedy Show. The Shmoo appeared, incongruously, in the segment Bedrock Cops as a police officer alongside part-time officers Fred Flintstone and Barney Rubble. Needless to add, this Shmoo had little relationship to the L'il Abner character, other than a superficial appearance. A later Hanna-Barbera venture, The New Shmoo, featured the character as an (inexplicably) shape-shifting mascot of Mighty Mysteries Comics, a group of teens who solve Scooby-Doo-like mysteries. In this series the Shmoo could metamorphose magically into any shape at will — like Tom Terrific. None of these revisionist revivals of the venerable character was particularly successful.

== In popular culture ==
- Frank Sinatra, who was frequently spoofed by Al Capp in Li'l Abner, has a line in the MGM musical On the Town (1949) about cops "multiplyin' like shmoos!"
- Florence King refers to owning a ceramic shmoo, which she threw out of her window after reading the books of Ayn Rand.
- In the 1990 movie Book of Love, the character Crutch wins a stuffed shmoo at a carnival.
- In the M*A*S*H television episode "Who Knew?", Colonel Potter (played by Harry Morgan) displays an inflatable shmoo toy in his office that he purchased for his grandson.
- In Larry Niven's Known Space stories, an alien species known as the Bandersnatch, also edible and intelligent, is described as being "smooth as a shmoo".
- In the novel The Forge of God by Greg Bear, "Shmoo" is the name humans give to the race of robots that visits Earth, due to their similar shape.
- Some overlapping similarities exist between shmoos and tribbles—the multitudinous alien creatures featured in a 1967 television episode from the original Star Trek. Like shmoos, tribbles also reproduced at such an alarming rate, they threatened ecological disaster. However, David Gerrold—who wrote "The Trouble with Tribbles"—drew his inspiration from an historical event: Australia's environmentally destructive rabbit overpopulation.
- The characters Gleep and Gloop—two protoplastic creatures from the Hanna-Barbera Saturday morning animated cartoon series The Herculoids—were clearly inspired by (and are sometimes mistaken for) shmoos.
- French artists Etienne Chambaud and David Jourdan have written "Economie de l'abondance ou La courte vie et les jours heureux", a new adventure of Jacques le fataliste et son maître from Diderot, based on the discovery by Jacques of the Shmoo.
- In the 2006 film Lucky Number Slevin, the character known only as "The Boss" (played by Morgan Freeman) refers to the Shmoo, recounting its original features as a source of plenty (in a monologue taken from an old Li'l Abner comic).
- The Marxist political philosopher Gerald Cohen used the story of the Shmoo to illustrate his objections to capitalism in an episode of Opinions.
- The Simpsons uses a statue of the Shmoo to replace the giant phallic statue from the film A Clockwork Orange in the episode "Treehouse of Horror XXV".
- In Cartoon Network's The Grim Adventures of Billy & Mandy, the Shmoo is seen dancing during Billy's story in the episode "Billy & Mandy Begins."
- The Shmoo is featured in "Bedrock Cops" as a friend and partner of Fred Flintstone and Barney Rubble.
- In all non-Japanese versions of the video game Castlevania: Symphony of the Night, there is an enemy monster called "Schmoo", an homage to the Shmoo. (In the original Japanese version, the monster is instead an obake called "Kyuu," an homage to the protagonist of the manga Obake no Q-tarō.) Schmoos appear in the Forbidden Library and they have a rare chance of dropping the Crissaegrim (Valmanway) upon death, the most powerful weapon in the game.
- During the Soviet Union's blockade of West Berlin, Germany in 1948, candy-filled shmoos were air-dropped to hungry West Berliners from transport planes by America's 17th Military Airport Squadron. The commanders of the Berlin airlift had cabled Capp, requesting the inflatable shmoos as part of Operation: Little Vittles. "When the candy-chocked shmoos were dropped, a near-riot resulted...."
- Shmoos invaded the 1948 presidential election, as challenger Thomas Dewey accused incumbent Harry S. Truman of "promising everything, including the Shmoo!"
- Capp periodically reintroduced the Shmoos in Li'l Abner, sometimes with significant variations. "Bad" Shmoos (called "Nogoodniks") debuted in a series of Sunday strips in 1949. The nasty cousin of the good-natured Shmoo, Nogoodniks were a sickly shade of green, and had "li'l red eyes, sharp yaller teeth, an' a dirty look". Frequently sporting 5 o'clock shadows, eye patches, scars, bandages, and other ruffian attributes—they devoured "good" Shmoos, were the sworn enemies of "hoomanity", and wreaked havoc on Dogpatch.
- In the ABC sitcom The Goldbergs, Beverley Goldberg endearingly refers to her children as Shmoos.
- The product of artist Mark Gonzale, Adidas sells a version of its Trefoil logo (termed the Shmoofoil), that is patterned after the Shmoo.

== Eponyms ==
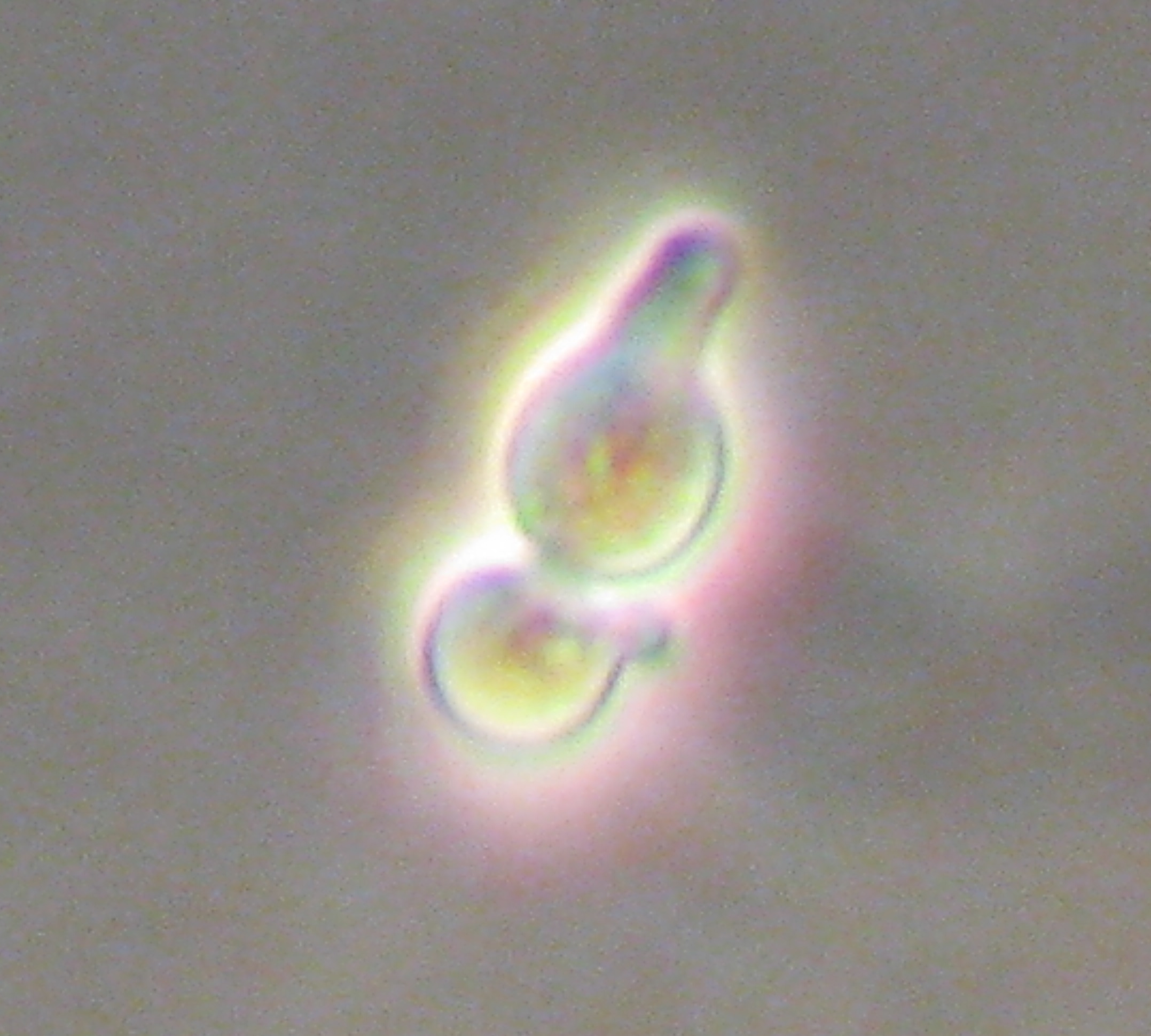
Saccharomyces cerevisiae yeast mating type a with shmoo responding to α-factor

The term "shmoo" has entered the English language, defining highly technical concepts in at least four separate fields of science:

- "Shmoo plot" is a technical term relating to the graphical display of test results in electrical engineering, dating back at least to 1966. The name most likely arose because the shape of the two-dimensional plots often resembled a shmoo. The term is also a verb: to "shmoo" means to run the test.
- In microbiology, the shmoo's uncanny resemblance to budding yeast—combined with its near-limitless usefulness—has led to the character's adoption as a mascot of sorts for scientists studying yeast as a model organism for genetics and cell biology. In fact, the cellular bulge that is produced by a haploid yeast cell as a response to a pheromone from the opposite mating type (either a or α-factor) is referred to as a "shmoo", because cells that are undergoing mating and present this particular structure resemble the cartoon character. The whole process is known to biologists as "shmooing". Shmoos are essential; without them, we would have neither bread nor beer. The word "shmoo" has appeared in nearly 700 science publications since 1974; it is used in labs studying the bread- and beer-making species Saccharomyces cerevisiae.
- Echinoderm biologists use "shmoo" (often misspelled "schmoo") to refer to a very simple, highly derived, blob-shaped larva found in some sea urchins (e.g. Wray 1996).
- The Mouse Head Mesemb, Muiria hortensae, a monotypic genus of succulent plant in the Aizoaceae, is also known as the Shmoo Plant. It is native to a small area of the Succulent Karoo of South Africa.
- In bird collections, skin specimens prepared without bills are often called "shmoos".
- It has been used in discussions of socioeconomics, for instance. In economics, a "widget" is any material good that is produced through labor (extracted, refined, manufactured, or assembled) from a finite resource—in contrast to a "shmoo", which is a material good that reproduces itself and is captured or bred as an economic activity (the original shmoo lives and reproduces without requiring any material sustenance). "If shmoos really existed, they would be a 'free good'." Erik Olin Wright uses the "parable of the shmoo" to introduce discussion of class structure and economics.
- In the field of particle physics, "shmoo" refers to a high energy cosmic ray survey instrument used at the Los Alamos National Laboratory for the Cygnus X-3 Sky Survey performed at the LAMPF (Los Alamos Meson Physics Facility) grounds. At one time, more than one hundred white "shmoo" detectors were sprinkled around the accelerator beamstop area and adjacent mesa to capture subatomic cosmic ray particles emitted from the Cygnus constellation. The detectors housed scintillators and photomultipliers in an array that gave the detector its distinctive shmoo shape. The particle accelerator Tevatron at Fermilab houses superconducting magnets that produce ice formations that also resembled shmoos.
- In medicine, the "Shmoo sign" refers to the appearance of a prominent, rounded left ventricle and dilated aorta on a plain AP chest radiograph, giving the appearance of a Shmoo.

Applied conversely, the shmoo has been cited as a hypothetical example of the potential falsifiability of natural selection as a key driving mechanism of biological evolution. That is, such a poorly adapted species could not possibly evolve via natural selection, so if it were to exist, it would falsify the theory.

== See also ==
- Eugene the Jeep
