= Fred and Barney Meet the Thing =

American animated television series

- Genre: Superhero
- Based on: The Flintstones by: William Hanna; Joseph Barbera; Thing by: Stan Lee; Jack Kirby
- Directed by: Ray Patterson; George Gordon; Carl Urbano
- Voices of: Henry Corden; Mel Blanc; Jean Vander Pyl; Gay Autterson; Joe Baker; Wayne Morton; Noelle North; John Erwin; Marilyn Schreffler; John Stephenson
- Country of origin: United States
- Original language: English
- No. of seasons: 1
- No. of episodes: 13 (26 segments of The Thing)

Production
- Executive producers: William Hanna; Joseph Barbera
- Producer: Alex Lovy
- Running time: 60 minutes
- Production companies: Hanna-Barbera Productions; Marvel Comics Group

Original release
- Network: NBC
- Release: September 8 – December 1, 1979

Related
- The New Fred and Barney Show; Fred and Barney Meet the Shmoo

Fred and Barney Meet the Thing is an American animated package show, and a spin-off of The Flintstones, produced by Hanna-Barbera Productions, which aired on NBC from September 8 to December 1, 1979.

Despite the show's title, the two segments remained separate and did not crossover with one another. The characters of Fred Flintstone, Barney Rubble and The Thing were only featured together during the opening title sequence and in brief bumpers between segments. The segments featuring Fred and Barney were episodes of The New Fred and Barney Show while The Thing was an unrelated new series co-produced with Marvel Comics. The actual idea for the series came from then NBC President Fred Silverman, who originated the concept for a series involving a "boy with a magic ring", and told Hanna-Barbera it needed a recognizable "celebrated attraction". As Hanna-Barbera had a relationship with Marvel producing comics off their IPs the company was able to negotiate for the likeness of The Thing.

For the 1979–80 season, the series was expanded to a 90-minute timeslot with the addition of The New Shmoo episodes and broadcast under the new title Fred and Barney Meet the Shmoo. For the following 1980-81 season, both The Thing and Shmoo segments would be removed in favor of The Flintstone Comedy Show.

Like many animated series created by Hanna-Barbera in the 1970s, only The New Fred and Barney Show segments of the show contained a laugh track, one of their last productions to do so.

== Premises ==
The first segment, a very loose adaptation of Marvel Comics' character The Thing, consisted of stories following the adventures of a scrawny, red-headed teenager named Benjy Grimm (voiced by Wayne Morton) who changes into the monstrous and mighty Thing (voiced by Joe Baker impersonating Jimmy Durante) by touching together two magic rings and reciting the words "Thing Ring, do your thing!", releasing an explosion of energy that causes orange rocks to hurl in from every direction and transform him into the stone-skinned superhero.

The stories centered mostly around Benjy at Centerville High School with his friends, the beautiful brunette Betty Harkness (voiced by Marilyn Schreffler), her snooty rich boyfriend Ronald Radford (voiced by John Erwin), and Betty's blond tomboy younger sister Kelly (voiced by Noelle North), with minimal adult supervision provided by Principal Twilly (voiced by Marilyn Schreffler). Only Kelly and her scientist father Professor Harkness (voiced by John Stephenson) know Benjy's secret identity.

When not battling various mad scientists and getting involved in Scooby-Doo-style mysteries, Thing spent most of his time using his superhuman strength to protect his pals from everyday dangers and the nasty practical jokes of leather-clad bully Spike Hanrahan (voiced by Art Metrano) and his biker buddies Stretch (voiced by Wayne Morton) and Turkey (voiced by Michael Sheehan) in the Yancy Street Gang.

Other members of the Fantastic Four did not appear in the show and the portrayal of the Thing and his origin story differed greatly from the original comics.

Twenty-six 11-minute episodes of The Thing were produced; two shorts aired per show.

=== Other appearances ===
In FF #8, Ant-Man and Dragon Man give Darla Deering her own Thing Rings to become Miss Thing, in a homage to Fred and Barney Meet the Thing.

Betty and Ronald appeared in Scooby-Doo: Where Are You #66, but it appears their names were changed, but remained similar (i.e. Betty was renamed to Bella).

=== Episodes ===
No. overall	No. in season	Title	Original release date
1	1	"The Picnic Panic"	September 8, 1979
Benjy and his friends attend their high school picnic at the Centerville Picnic Grounds, but when the Yancy Street Gang shows up at the picnic and causes trouble, Thing must save the day.
2	2	"Bigfoot Meets the Thing"	September 8, 1979
Benjy and his friends confront a real Bigfoot while on a ski trip at North Woods Ski Lodge.
3	3	"Junkyard Hijinks"	September 15, 1979
Benjy and his friends decide to transform the Yancy Street Gang's junkyard into a playground for the neighborhood children.
4	4	"Gone Away Gulch"	September 15, 1979
Benjy and his friends visit the town of Gone Away Gulch and, during a storm, the group seeks shelter in a deserted hotel haunted by an old prospector.
5	5	"Circus Stampede"	September 22, 1979
Benjy and his friends attend the Barney and Baillum Circus where the Yancy Street Gang sets loose a mouse causing the elephants to stampede and all the other animals to escape.
6	6	"The Thing and the Queen"	September 22, 1979
When Betty runs for homecoming queen, the Yancy Street Gang (whose friend Sophie is also vying for the same title) resorts to their usual dirty tactics as they try to sabotage Betty's campaign.
7	7	"Carnival Caper"	September 29, 1979
Benjy and his friends visit a local carnival and after stopping a runaway ferris wheel and fixing it, Thing is offered a job at the carnival by its owner.
8	8	"The Thing Blanks Out"	September 29, 1979
Benjy and his friends enjoy a trip aboard Ronald's father's yacht. Thing saves the group from crashing into a downed drawbridge, but then he is stricken with amnesia following the closing drawbridge's impact on his head.
9	9	"The Thing Meets the Clunk"	October 6, 1979
Professor Harkness' friend Dr. Quimby introduces his latest invention – a robot called Clunk who is programmed to do good. However, the robot malfunctions, goes out-of-control, and causes trouble for Thing.
10	10	"Beach Party Crashers"	October 6, 1979
Benjy attends a beachside surf party with Kelly, Betty, Ronald and Principal Twilly, but the Yancy Street Gang are up to their old tricks as they crash the party and sabotage a volleyball game.
11	11	"Decepto the Great"	October 13, 1979
A magician named Decepto the Great performs his magic show at the high school fair, but Benjy discovers Decepto is stealing from the school kids and it's up to Thing to stop him from escaping town.
12	12	"The Thing's the Play"	October 13, 1979
Betty studies with acting teacher Ferdinand Bestmore so she can audition for a TV crew coming to Centerville High School to shoot a commercial. However, Bestmore confuses Betty with an old actress he once discovered and whom she resembles so he kidnaps her.
13	13	"Double Trouble for the Thing"	October 20, 1979
An evil scientist named Danton Blackwood creates a robot Thing to commit crime to make the citizens believe Thing has gone bad, but which also lands the real Thing in jail.
14	14	"To Thing or Not to Thing"	October 20, 1979
Benjy takes an experimental cure for his condition. During a trip to the mountains with Kelly, Betty, and Ronald, it makes him switch back and forth between Benjy and Thing.
15	15	"The Big Bike Race"	October 27, 1979
Benjy enters a cross country bike race because the winner gets to escort the Race Queen to the dance.
16	16	"The Thing and the Treasure Hunt"	October 27, 1979
While on an afternoon trip aboard Ronald's boat, Benjy and his friends find an old box that contains a treasure map and the Yancy Street Gang resort to their old tricks to beat them to the treasure.
17	17	"Out to Launch"	November 3, 1979
Benjy and his friends are going to a ship launching but the world's greatest demolition expert intends to ruin the day.
18	18	"The Day the Ring Didn't Do a Thing"	November 3, 1979
The Yancy Street Gang decides to steal Benjy's ring causing no end of trouble for Thing.
19	19	"A Hot Air Affair at the Fair"	November 10, 1979
Benjy enters a hot air balloon race, but the Yancy Street Gang plans on doing whatever it takes to make sure he loses.
20	20	"The Thing Goes to the Dogs"	November 10, 1979
Ronald has entered his dog Countess in the Centerville Dog Show, but chaos ensues when Countess is dognapped by the troublesome Yancy Street Gang and it's up to Thing to rescue her.
21	21	"The Thing Goes Camping"	November 17, 1979
Benjy, his friends, and Principal Twilly go on a camping trip as part of a special school project which is anything but relaxing with a bear running loose at their campsite and a big storm triggering a landslide that threatened the entire camp.
22	22	"Dude Ranch Rodeo"	November 17, 1979
Benjy, his friends, and Principal Twilly visit the Big Butte Ranch where Ronald, Thing, and the Yancy Street Gang compete in a rodeo.
23	23	"Photo Finish"	November 24, 1979
Benjy accompanies his friends to the Centerville Zoo which is sponsoring a photo contest and the Yancy Street Gang resorts to their usual dirty tactics to win.
24	24	"Lights, Action, Thing!"	November 24, 1979
Ronald and Betty are hired to appear in a movie currently filming at a local lake, but problems occur when a mechanical octopus monster (controlled by an angry and fired stuntman) attacks the set, trying to sabotage the entire production. It's up to Thing to make sure the film goes off without a hitch.
25	25	"The Thing and the Captain's Ghost"	December 1, 1979
The Yancy Street Gang dares Ben and his friends to stay on a haunted ship for a night.
26	26	"The Thing and the Absent-Minded Inventor"	December 1, 1979
Benjy and his friends attend Centerville's annual inventors show where they meet the absent-minded Fenwick Twilly (Principal Twilly's uncle) who unveils his gigantic vacuum cleaner Supervac, which sucks everything in sight and destroys all the other inventions during its rampage.

== Second run ==
The "Fred and Barney" half of the show consisted of a second season of seven new 30-minute episodes of The New Fred and Barney Show combined with reruns of first-season episodes.

== Voice cast ==
- Wayne Morton as Benjy Grimm, Stretch
- Joe Baker as The Thing
- Noelle North as Kelly Harkness
- Marilyn Schreffler as Betty Harkness, Miss Twilly
- John Erwin as Ronald Radford
- Art Metrano as Spike Hanrahan
- Michael Sheehan as Turkey
- John Stephenson as Professor Harkness, Various guest characters
- Paul Winchell as Dr. Quimby (in "The Thing Meets the Clunk")
