= The New Shmoo =

American animated TV series 1979–1980

- Based on: Shmoo by Al Capp
- Developed by: Len Janson; Chuck Menville
- Written by: Gene Ayres; Art Browne Jr. Douglas Booth; Buzz Dixon; Donald F. Glut; Len Janson; Dale Kirby; Glenn Leopold; Chuck Menville; J. Michael Reaves; Jim Ryan
- Directed by: Ray Patterson; Carl Urbano; Oscar Dufau; George Gordon
- Voices of: Frank Welker; Dolores Cantu-Primo; Bill Idelson; Chuck McCann
- Theme music composer: Hoyt Curtin
- Composer: Hoyt Curtin
- Country of origin: United States
- Original language: English
- No. of seasons: 1
- No. of episodes: 13 (16 segments)

Production
- Executive producers: Joseph Barbera; William Hanna
- Producers: Art Scott; Alex Lovy
- Running time: 30 minutes
- Production company: Hanna-Barbera Productions

Original release
- Network: NBC
- Release: September 22 – December 15, 1979

The New Shmoo is an American animated television series based on the character from the Li'l Abner comic strip created by Al Capp, produced by Hanna-Barbera Productions and broadcast on NBC from September 22 to December 15, 1979.

The New Shmoo was broadcast as a stand-alone half-hour series from September 22 to December 1, 1979. Beginning December 8, 1979, the remaining five episodes of The New Shmoo were now incorporated into the 90-minute package show Fred and Barney Meet the Shmoo which also featured combined reruns of Fred and Barney Meet the Thing. Despite the show's title, Fred, Barney, the Thing, and Shmoo only met each other in brief bumpers between their individual segments.

== Plot ==
Similar to Scooby-Doo, Where Are You! on CBS and later ABC, the show follows a group of teenagers—Mickey, Nita, and Billy Joe—who solve mysteries and crimes with their friend, Shmoo, a friendly bulbous creature who can stretch and shape his body into any form he wants. The teens worked for Mighty Mysteries Comics.

== Production ==
During the original NBC run, the program included a short segment called "Sing Along With The Shmoo". In a manner reminiscent of Screen Songs, Shmoo became a bouncing ball, providing visual guidance to song lyrics so that viewers could sing along with the cartoon.

== Cast ==
- Frank Welker as Shmoo
- Dolores Cantu as Nita
- Bill Idelson as Mickey
- Chuck McCann as Billy Joe
- Additional voices: Joe Baker, Daws Butler, Bob Hastings, Jim MacGeorge, Margaret McIntyre, Ginny McSwain, Don Messick, Hal Smith, John Stephenson, Janet Waldo, Bill Woodson

== Episodes ==
No.	Title	Original release date
1	"The Amazing Captain Mentor"	September 22, 1979
A superhero comes to town to capture and rehabilitate bank robbers... or does he?
2	"The Ber-Shmoo-Da Triangle"	September 29, 1979
The gang boards a plane bound for the Bermuda Triangle, unaware that their "pilots" are actually a pair of jewel thieves.
3	"The Beast of Black Lake The Crystal Ball of Crime"	October 6, 1979
The Beast of Black Lake: Black Lake is menaced by a serpentine monster that may or may not be real. The Crystal Ball of Crime: Madame Natasha is able to predict crimes before they're committed. Billy Joe has a premonition of his own--that Madame Natasha herself will commit a robbery!
4	"The Energy Robbers from Space"	October 13, 1979
Aliens are stealing energy sources from a research lab. With help from Professor Potts, the gang exposes the criminals.
5	"Dr. Morton's Monster The Flying Disc of Doom"	October 20, 1979
Dr. Morton's Monster: During a storm, a robot built by Dr. Morton seems to be creating havoc. He's actually helping to repair damage, but the townspeople don't see it that way. They cause the robot to go on a rampage, and only Shmoo can short it out. The Flying Disc of Doom: Aliens turn back time, and seem to turn a farmer's dog into a puppy. But is there more to this strange turn of events?
6	"The Haunting of Atlantis"	October 27, 1979
Shmoo and company join a world famous oceanographer in his search for Atlantis, whose inhabitants don't exactly take kindly to intruders.
7	"Monster Island"	November 3, 1979
A distress call brings the team out to Odyssey Island, where a Cyclops, Minotaur, and Medusa are running amok.
8	"The Return of Dracula"	November 10, 1979
The gang discovers that Dracula is alive and well and living in Transylvania.
9	"Swamp of Evil"	November 17, 1979 ^{1}
The group ends up in a small town after getting lost during their vacation. They realize someone's been dumping harmful chemicals in the swamp. But who? And why?
10	"The Terror of the Trolls"	November 24, 1979 ^{1}
An island is menaced by a horde of trolls.
11	"The Valley Where Time Stood Still"	December 1, 1979 ^{1}
While visiting a ranch out west, the kids and Shmoo discover a valley inhabited by cavemen and dinosaurs.
12	"The Pyramid of Peril The Wail of the Banshee"	December 8, 1979
The Pyramid of Peril: A billionaire is convinced a pyramid can make him young again. Mickey, Nita, Billy Joe, and Shmoo expose the scam. The Wail of the Banshee: A banshee is haunting the Dalton Estate.
13	"The Warlock of Voodoo Island"	December 15, 1979 ^{1}
Mickey's grandma, a lighthouse operator, is terrorized by a mysterious warlock.

- ^{1} These episodes were incorporated into the 90-minute package show Fred and Barney Meet the Shmoo.

== Broadcast history ==
The New Shmoo originally aired in these following formats on NBC:

- The New Shmoo (September 22, 1979 – December 15, 1979)
- Fred and Barney Meet the Shmoo (September 22, 1979 – November 15, 1980)
