= Fred and Barney Meet the Shmoo =

- Genre: Comedy; Slapstick; Mystery; Adventure
- Based on: The Flintstones by: William Hanna; Joseph Barbera; Thing by: Stan Lee; Jack Kirby; Shmoo by: Al Capp
- Directed by: Ray Patterson; George Gordon
- Voices of: Henry Corden; Mel Blanc; Jean Vander Pyl; Gay Autterson; Joe Baker; Wayne Norton; Marilyn Schreffler; Frank Welker; Dolores Cantu-Primo
- Country of origin: United States
- Original language: English
- No. of seasons: 1
- No. of episodes: 17 (59 segments)

Production
- Executive producers: William Hanna; Joseph Barbera
- Producer: Art Scott
- Running time: 90 minutes
- Production company: Hanna-Barbera Productions

Original release
- Network: NBC
- Release: December 8, 1979 – November 15, 1980

Related
- Fred and Barney Meet the Thing; The Flintstone Comedy Show

Fred and Barney Meet the Shmoo is an American animated package show and a spin-off of The Flintstones produced by Hanna-Barbera which aired on NBC from December 8, 1979, to November 15, 1980. The 90-minute show is a repackaging of episodes from Fred and Barney Meet the Thing combined with the addition of The New Shmoo episodes (which was originally broadcast as a stand-alone half-hour series).

The series contained the following three segments:

- The New Fred and Barney Show (a revival of The Flintstones) – one episode, 30 minutes
- The Thing (based on the Marvel Comics superhero Thing) – two episodes, 11 minutes each
- The New Shmoo (based on the Li'l Abner comic strip character Shmoo) – one episode, 30 minutes

Despite the show's title, the three segments remained separate and did not crossover with one another. The characters of Fred Flintstone, Barney Rubble, Thing and Shmoo were only featured together in brief bumpers between segments, and the original half-hour episodes of The New Shmoo were now split into two-parters, allowing more mingling and mixing of the program's individual segments. In 1980–81, Shmoo joined Fred and Barney as part-time police officers on the "Bedrock Cops" segments of The Flintstone Comedy Show.

During the series' initial run, a television special called The Harlem Globetrotters Meet Snow White (also produced by Hanna-Barbera) was shown in four parts on Fred and Barney Meet the Shmoo on four consecutive Saturday mornings (September 27, October 4, 11, 18, 1980), despite having no narrative connection to the show.

Like many animated series created by Hanna-Barbera in the 1970s, only The New Fred and Barney Show segments of the show contained a laugh track, one of their last productions to do so.

== Voice cast ==
=== The New Fred and Barney Show ===
- Henry Corden as Fred Flintstone
- Jean Vander Pyl as Wilma Flintstone, Pebbles Flintstone
- Mel Blanc as Barney Rubble, Dino
- Gay Autterson as Betty Rubble
- Don Messick as Bamm-Bamm Rubble
- John Stephenson as Mr. Slate

=== The Thing ===
- Wayne Norton as Benjy Grimm
- Joe Baker as The Thing
- Noelle North as Kelly Harkness
- Marilyn Schreffler as Betty Harkness, Miss Twilly
- John Erwin as Ronald Radford
- Art Metrano as Spike
- Michael Sheehan as Turkey
- John Stephenson as Dr. Harkness, Stretch

=== The New Shmoo ===
- Frank Welker as Shmoo
- Dolores Cantu-Primo as Nita
- Bill Idelson as Mickey
- Chuck McCann as Billy Joe
