= Yogi Bear (disambiguation) =

Yogi Bear is a fictional bear who appears in animated cartoons created by Hanna-Barbera Productions.

Yogi Bear may also refer to:

== Television animation ==
=== Series ===
- The Yogi Bear Show (1961)
- Yogi Bear & Friends (1967)
- Yogi's Gang (1973)
- Yogi's Space Race (1978)
  - Galaxy Goof-Ups (1978 spin-off from Yogi's Space Race)
- Yogi's Treasure Hunt (1985)
- The New Yogi Bear Show (1988)
- Yo Yogi! (1991)

=== Television films and specials ===
- Yogi's First Christmas (1980)
- Yogi Bear's All Star Comedy Christmas Caper (1982)
- Yogi Bear and the Magical Flight of the Spruce Goose (1987)
- Yogi the Easter Bear (1994)
- Yogi's Great Escape (1987)
- Yogi and the Invasion of the Space Bears (1988)

=== Other ===
- Yogi Bear's Big Break, the original animated short where Yogi made his debut, shown as part of the Huckleberry Hound Show

== Theatrical films ==
- Hey There, It's Yogi Bear!, 1964 animated musical comedy film
- Yogi Bear (film), 2010 live-action/animated feature film

== Video games ==
- Yogi Bear (video game), a 1987 computer game
- Adventures of Yogi Bear, a 1994 video game for the Super NES console
- Yogi Bear's Gold Rush, a 1994 video game for the Nintendo Game Boy

== Albums ==
- Yogi Bear and the Three Stooges Meet the Mad, Mad, Mad Dr. No-No, a 1966 comedy album

== See also ==
- List of The Yogi Bear Show episodes
- List of Yogi Bear characters
- Yogi Bear's Jellystone Park Camp-Resorts
- Yogi Berra
