= Yakky Doodle =

Hanna-Barbera cartoon character

- The Huckleberry Hound Show, The Quick Draw McGraw Show and The Yogi Bear Show character
- First appearance: "Slumber Party Smarty" (1958)
- Created by: William Hanna; Joseph Barbera
- Voiced by: Jimmy Weldon (1960–1987, Cartoon Network commercial); Walker Edmiston (Yogi's Ark Lark; 1972); Frank Welker (Scooby's All-Star Laff-A-Lympics; 1977–present); Steve Blum (Harvey Birdman, Attorney at Law); Chris Edgerly (Harvey Birdman, Attorney at Law, 1 episode only); Katie Grober (Jellystone! as a female; 2022)

In-universe information
- Species: Duck
- Gender: Male, Female (in Jellystone!)

Yakky Doodle is a fictional anthropomorphic yellow duckling with green wings, who appears for the first time in prototype form on The Huckleberry Hound Show in 1958 and on The Quick Draw McGraw Show in 1960, and in regular design on The Yogi Bear Show in 1961, on his own segment. Yakky's name is a spoof of "Yankee Doodle".

== Character description ==
The template for Yakky was Quacker, a similar duckling character voiced by Red Coffey who appeared in a number of classic Tom and Jerry theatrical cartoons, debuting in the 1950 short subject Little Quacker. Weldon, a former children's television series host and ventriloquist, had based this character on his "partner" Webster Webfoot. The same design was also used for a duckling in The Huckleberry Hound Show's Pixie and Dixie and Mr. Jinks segment "A Wise Quack" (Episode 48), as a blue duckling in Yogi Bear segment "Slumber Party Smarty" (Episode 2) and "Duck in Luck" (Episode 18) and as a purple duckling in the Loopy De Loop segment "This is my Ducky Day" (Episode 13).

== Main characters ==
The main characters in Yakky Doodle's cartoons are:

- Yakky Doodle (voiced by Jimmy Weldon using buccal speech technique): An anthropomorphic yellow duckling with green wings who lives with his best friend and adoptive father Chopper the bulldog. Yakky is always one to run into danger. This usually comes in the form of the show's main antagonist Fibber Fox or secondary villain Alfy Gator. Chopper defends his "Little Buddy" fiercely, and is always ready to pound Fibber or any other enemy into oblivion if necessary. Yakky's tendency to put himself in great danger never draws a rebuke from Chopper, who presumably enjoys his protective role. One of Yakky's repeated lines is "Are you my mama?", and one of the songs Yakky loves to sing is "Ta-ra-ra Boom-de-ay".
- Chopper (voiced by Vance Colvig impersonating Wallace Beery): A bulldog who always protects Yakky from harm and is also his adoptive father. If he thinks that the only way to do this is to send Yakky away, he's willing to pretend he is not the duckling's friend anymore; otherwise, he's the best friend Yakky has. Although he acts tough, in some ways he can be just as childlike as Yakky, such as when he wished he could fly like a bird. Chopper's repeated line is "Now, ain't that cute", as well as saying "Now close your eyes, Yakky. You shouldn't oughta see what I'm going to do to this fox/cat" before beating up Fibber or the cat. Another repeated quote is when Chopper feels guilty over having to turn Yakky away, and hopes that he didn't "hurt his feelings".
- Fibber Fox (voiced by Daws Butler impersonating Shelley Berman): A fox who first tried to use Yakky as a "bargaining chip" to get the chickens from a henhouse that Chopper was guarding; since then, he has been fixated on catching and eating Yakky, at one point saying that he now hates chicken and wants duck instead. He shows cunning in his plans, most of which are intended to get Chopper out of the way so he can have a clear run at Yakky. For all his predatory behavior, however, he may not be able to eat Yakky. In one episode, he finds that he just can't bring himself to cook or otherwise harm the little duckling, or even let another fox eat him.
- The Cat (also voiced by Daws Butler impersonating Shelley Berman): An unnamed cat who is an indirect kin to Fibber Fox also had a similar objective to eat Yakky. However, he often gets punished by Chopper or by the mistress of the house.
- Alfy Gator (voiced by Daws Butler impersonating Alfred Hitchcock): A blue alligator who tries to capture Yakky because his gourmet guidebook recommends roast duck. He tends to be verbose while setting his traps, probably as an imitation of Hitchcock's introductions on the TV show Alfred Hitchcock Presents. Also taken from that show is Hitchcock's silhouette & outline routine, which Alfy imitates in most of the cartoons he's in. One time he found himself competing with Fibber to catch Yakky, but the two predators eventually agreed to work together to capture the duck (the cartoon ended during the final chase, but presumably Yakky got away).

== List of episodes ==
Every episode was produced and directed by William Hanna and Joseph Barbera.

No.	Title	Written by	Animation	Story Director	Original release date	Prod. code
1	"Out of Luck Duck"	Mike Maltese	Lew Marshall	Alex Lovy	1960	R-2
2	"Hop, Duck and Listen"	Mike Maltese	Hicks Lokey	Alex Lovy	1961	R-5
3	"Dog Flight"	Mike Maltese	Lew Marshall	Alex Lovy	1961	R-15
4	"Easter Duck"	Warren Foster	Don Patterson	Alex Lovy	1961	R-17
5	"Foxy Duck"	Mike Maltese	Art Davis	Paul Sommer	1961	R-7
6	"Railroaded Duck"	Mike Maltese	Bill Keil	Alex Lovy	1961	R-11
7	"Duck Hunting"	Warren Foster	Bob Bentley	Alex Lovy	1961	R-14
8	"Whistle-Stop and Go"	Mike Maltese	Art Davis	Alex Lovy	1961	R-8
9	"Duck the Music"	Mike Maltese	C.L. Hartman	Paul Sommer	1961	R-19
10	"School Fool"	Mike Maltese	Bill Keil	Alex Lovy	1961	R-24
11	"Oh Duckter"	Mike Maltese	Allen Wilzbach	Alex Lovy	1961	R-18
12	"It's a Duck's Life"	Mike Maltese	Art Davis	Alex Lovy	1961	R-36
13	"Happy Birthdaze"	TBD	C. L. Hartman	TBA	1961	R-28
14	"Horse Collared"	Mike Maltese	Hicks Lokey	Paul Sommer	1961	R-22
15	"Ha-Choo to You!"	Mike Maltese	Ralph Somerville	Alex Lovy	1961	R-13
16	"Foxy Proxy"	Mike Maltese	Dick Lundy	Paul Sommer	1961	R-49
17	"Count to Tenant"	Mike Maltese	Bob Bentley	Art Davis	1961	R-40
18	"Shrunken Headache"	Tony Benedict	Carlo Vinci	Art Davis	1961	R-55
19	"The Most Ghost"	Mike Maltese	Allen Wilzbach	Paul Sommer	1961	R-52
20	"Stamp Scamp"	Mike Maltese	C.L. Hartman	Paul Sommer	1961	R-43
21	"All's Well That Eats Well"	Tony Benedict	Carlo Vinci	Alex Lovy	1961	R-58
22	"Foxy Friends"	Mike Maltese	Bob Carr	Art Davis	1961	R-46
23	"Mad Mix Up"	Mike Maltese	Bob Carr	Paul Sommer	1961	R-64
24	"Beach Brawl"	Mike Maltese	Don Patterson	Paul Sommer	1961	R-61
25	"Duck Seasoning"	Tony Benedict	Don Williams	Lew Marshall	1961	R-67
26	"Hasty Tasty"	Tony Benedict	Clarke Mallery	Lew Marshall	1961	R-74
27	"Nobody Home Duck"	Mike Maltese	Bob Bentley	Lew Marshall	1961	R-65
28	"Dog Pounded"	Tony Benedict	Hicks Lokey	Lew Marshall	1961	R-71
29	"Witch Duck-ter"	Mike Maltese	Don Towsley	John Freeman	1961	R-79
30	"Full Course Meal"	Tony Benedict	Don Towsley	John Freeman	1962	R-77
31	"Baddie Buddies"	Tony Benedict	Dick Lundy	Lew Marshall	1962	R-81
32	"Judo Ex-Expert"	Mike Maltese	Harry Holt	Art Davis	1962	R-82

== Other appearances ==
- Yakky Doodle makes an appearance in the 31st episode of Snooper and Blabber, "De-Duck-Tives".
- Yakky Doodle makes an appearance in the third episode of Snagglepuss, "Live and Lion".
- In 1972, Yakky (voiced by Walker Edmiston) and Chopper was one of the dozens of characters to appear in the TV-movie Yogi's Ark Lark (which was part of The ABC Saturday Superstar Movie).
- Yakky Doodle only had three non-speaking cameo appearances (The Envy Brothers, Captain Swipe and Mr. Sloppy) in the TV movie's sequel series, Yogi's Gang.
- In the late 1970s, Yakky Doodle (voiced by Frank Welker) appeared as a member of "The Yogi Yahooeys" team on Scooby's All-Star Laff-A-Lympics / Scooby's All-Stars and would often team up with Grape Ape in sporting competitions.
- In Yogi Bear's All Star Comedy Christmas Caper, Yakky Doodle (alongside Magilla Gorilla and Wally Gator) was unable to help Yogi Bear and his friends locate J. Wellington Jones.
- In 1987, Yakky and Chopper appeared at the start and end of the episode "Snow White and The 7 Treasure Hunters" on Yogi's Treasure Hunt.
- Originally, Yakky Doodle intended to appear as a cameo during the final scene of the 1988 film Who Framed Roger Rabbit.
- Yakky Doodle appears in Harvey Birdman, Attorney at Law, voiced by Steve Blum in most episodes and by Chris Edgerly in one episode.
- Yakky Doodle has appeared in comics as well. He can be seen on the covers of Marvel Comics' 1977 comic book series, "The Funtastic World of Hanna-Barbera" on the first and third issues.
- Yakky Doodle appeared in DC Comics Deathstroke/Yogi Bear Special #1 as a captured animal alongside other Hanna-Barbera characters.
- Yakky Doodle made a cameo appearance in the Animaniacs revival segment "Suffragette City".
- Yakky Doodle and Chopper appeared in Jellystone! with Yakky voiced by Katie Grober and Chopper voiced by Angelique Perrin. Yakky and Chopper are both females in this series and are portrayed as a family as Yakky refers to Chopper as her adoptive mother. Chopper is also revealed to be the proprietor of a pizzeria called the Cattanooga Cheese Explosion.
- It's Yakky Doodle's vocal style, not Donald Duck's as commonly assumed, that's used for the duck voice in the song Disco Duck, including a reference to Yakky's always-searched-for "mama".
