= Yogi's Ark Lark =

1972 American animated television special

- Title card
- Written by: Bob Ogle; Dick Robbins
- Directed by: Joseph Barbera; William Hanna
- Starring: Daws Butler; Henry Corden; Walker Edmiston; Allan Melvin; Don Messick; John Stephenson; Jean Vander Pyl; Lennie Weinrib
- Theme music composer: Hoyt Curtin (musical director); Paul DeKorte (musical supervision)
- Country of origin: United States
- Original language: English

Production
- Producers: Joseph Barbera; William Hanna
- Running time: 45 minutes
- Production company: Hanna-Barbera Productions

Original release
- Network: ABC
- Release: September 16, 1972

Yogi's Ark Lark is a 1972 American animated television special produced by Hanna-Barbera Productions, intended to raise ecological awareness. Written by Bob Ogle and Dick Robbins and directed by Joseph Barbera and William Hanna, it was broadcast on ABC on September 16, 1972 as part of The ABC Saturday Superstar Movie, and served as the two-part pilot for Yogi's Gang.

Aside from its environmental message, the film marked a milestone in Hanna-Barbera's history: a wide range of the studio’s characters were united in one story for the first time. This set the tone for future series and specials, such as Laff-A-Lympics and Yogi's First Christmas.

== Plot ==
Concerned about the terrible state of the environment, the entire animal kingdom from Hanna-Barbera gather for a meeting in Jellystone Park, chaired by Yogi Bear. They decide to leave their homes and search for "the perfect place" — a legendary and trouble-free place free of pollution, deforestation, and other forms of mankind's despoilment and has a few simple problems. Though Boo-Boo Bear states to Yogi that Ranger Smith will not like it. Jellystone maintenance man Noah Smitty helps them build a flying ship (which looks like Noah's Ark with a propeller on top and retractable wheels) for their journey, and they decide to name it after him. Because "Smitty's Houseboat" is too long to paint on the bow, they name it "Noah's Ark." With Yogi at the helm, they travel to places around the world, searching for "the perfect place" as the ark is powered by Magilla Gorilla running on a treadmill to get to his bananas.

They start by driving down the highway into the ocean, where they soon end up on the back of a sleeping Moby Dick. Huckleberry Hound is sent down to wake him. They then end up stranded in the Sahara Desert which they originally mistake for a beach. The desert sun causes Yogi to hallucinate and believe he is the pharaoh King Tut and his friends are his slaves until Boo-Boo and Noah Smitty arrive. Some moments later, So-So the monkey spots an oasis which is "the perfect place." As Yogi and crew settle down to make themselves at home, Lambsy spots a "dragon" which turns out to be a construction vehicle developing a new city. Yogi and the crew then take their leave of the area. Afterwards, they arrive in Antarctic territory, which they decide to live as a brand new "perfect place." They begin settling there until a similar situation happens like at the oasis. Next, Yogi and the crew wind up in outer space upon going up too far, which they decide is a new and improved "perfect place." It isn’t long before Earth ejects its "junk" (missiles, satellites, etc.) into space.

With the Ark back on earth and sailing the sea, morale has dropped among the animals: Huck throws water down a pipe which causes Dum Dum to emerge and throw water at him, Quick Draw McGraw insults Snagglepuss' slicing of salami, Peter Potamus insults Magilla Gorilla by telling him "he looks like a gorilla", and Lippy the Lion grows tired of Hardy Har Har's complaining. Yogi Bear becomes aware of this just as So-So spots a typhoon coming. The animals struggle to survive the typhoon like Dum Dum roping Huck and Lippy saving Hardy. The typhoon lands them on top of a mountain, and the animals almost believe that they’ve found what they’ve been looking for....only to be disappointed again when Yakky Doodle returns with an empty tin can and the animals notice a deforestation occurring.

At this point, the younger animals (consisting of Augie Doggie, Baba Looey, Boo-Boo, Lambsy, and Shag Rugg) decide that they should all simply go back home and clean up the messes that they were trying to escape. This decision is met with unanimous approval, and the animals all head for home so that they can start turning it into "the perfect place". During the credits, Wally Gator and Squiddly Diddly are cleaning the rivers, Paw and Shag Rugg are picking up garbage around their house, and Yogi Bear picks up a recently discarded hamburger wrapper.

== List of characters ==
The following Hanna-Barbera characters appeared in this movie (not all of whom appeared on Yogi’s Gang) in alphabetical order:

- Atom Ant
- Augie Doggie and Doggie Daddy
- The Hillbilly Bears
- Hokey Wolf and Ding-A-Ling
- Huckleberry Hound
- Lambsy (from the It's the Wolf segment of Cattanooga Cats)
- Lippy the Lion and Hardy Har Har
- Magilla Gorilla
- Moby Dick (from Moby Dick and Mighty Mightor)
- Peter Potamus and So-So
- Pixie and Dixie
- Quick Draw McGraw and Baba Looey
- Ruff and Reddy
- Sawtooth the Beaver (Rufus Ruffcut's pet beaver on Wacky Races)
- Secret Squirrel
- Snagglepuss
- Squiddly Diddly
- Top Cat and his gang (Benny the Ball, Spook, Choo-Choo, Fancy-Fancy, and Brain)
- Touché Turtle and Dum Dum
- Wally Gator
- Yakky Doodle and Chopper
- Yogi Bear and Boo-Boo
- An unknown dinosaur character

== Differences between the pilot and the series ==
- Although this was the pilot for Yogi's Gang, some changes were made for the series:
  - Noah Smitty was written out and only the animals were on the ark.
  - The vessel's name was changed from "Noah's Ark" to "Yogi's Ark".
  - Top Cat and his gang, Lambsy, Ruff and Reddy, and Sawtooth the Beaver were also written out, thus giving the ark a smaller crew.
- This one-hour feature was later turned into two half-hour episodes of Yogi's Gang with new intro and concluding sequences for each episode as well as a reference to Noah Smitty building the ark. To fit the feature into these new time frames, some of its sequences were shortened or edited out.
- The song "The Perfect Place" is sung six times throughout the film, and would later be remade as the theme song for Yogi's Gang, with different lyrics.

== Voice cast ==
- Daws Butler as Yogi Bear, Huckleberry Hound, Quick Draw McGraw, Snagglepuss, Wally Gator, Peter Potamus, Augie Doggie, Lippy the Lion, Dixie, Baba Looey, Lambsy, Top Cat
- Henry Corden as Paw Rugg, Truck Driver #1
- Walker Edmiston as Squiddly Diddly, Yakky Doodle
- Allan Melvin as Magilla Gorilla, Truck Driver #2, Man
- Don Messick as Boo-Boo, Atom Ant, Touché Turtle, Pixie, So-So, Moby Dick
- John Stephenson as Benny the Ball, Doggie Daddy, Hardy Har Har
- Jean Vander Pyl as Flo Rugg, Maw Rugg, Woman Passenger
- Lennie Weinrib as Cap'n Noah Smitty

== Home media ==
Yogi's Ark Lark was released on the Yogi's Gang: The Complete Series DVD from the Warner Archive Collection on February 19, 2013.

Yogi's Ark Lark was included as a bonus feature for the Blu-ray release of Yogi and the Invasion of the Space Bears from Warner Archive on February 20, 2024.

== See also ==
- List of works produced by Hanna-Barbera
- The Yogi Bear Show
- The New Yogi Bear Show
- Yogi's Treasure Hunt
- Yogi's Gang
