= Boo-Boo Bear =

American animated television and film character

- The Yogi Bear Show character
- First appearance: Yogi Bear's Big Break (1958)
- Created by: William Hanna; Joseph Barbera
- Voiced by: List: Don Messick (1958–1996); Jack Mercer (Movie Wheels Present Huckleberry Hound and Yogi Bear (1960)); Frank Milano (Songs of Yogi Bear and his Pals LP (1961), A Hap-Hap-Happy Christmas from Yogi Bear (1961), How to Be a Better-Than-the Average Child Without Really Trying! (1962), Hey There, It's Yogi Bear! LP (1964)); Ernest Newton (singing voice in Hey There, It's Yogi Bear!); June Foray (Yogi Bear and Boo Boo Tell Stories of Little Red Riding Hood and Jack and the Beanstalk LP (1965)); Chuck McCann (Wake Up, America! LP (1965)); Daws Butler (1973–1983; "Hear-See-Do" Hanna-Barbera Record of Safety, Macy's Thanksgiving Day Parade (animated segments)); Keith Scott (Pauls commercial); Tony Pope (This Land is Our Land: The Yogi Bear Environmental Album); Billy West (1993–1999; Cartoon Network bumpers); Jeff Bergman (1997–2002, 2021–present; Cartoon Network bumpers, Lullabye-Bye Bear, When Bears Attack, GEICO commercial); Greg Burson (PrimeStar commercial); John Kricfalusi (Boo Boo Runs Wild, A Day in the Life of Ranger Smith, Boo Boo and the Man); Tom Kenny (1998–2004; I Am Weasel; Fruity Pebbles commercial; Harvey Birdman, Attorney at Law; The Grim Adventures of Billy & Mandy); Victor Yerrid (Robot Chicken); Scott Innes (At Picnic, Forest, Honey Lesson); Justin Timberlake (2010 film); Tom Virtue (Yogi Bear: The Video Game); Seth Green (Robot Chicken); Chris Cox (Mad); Eric Bauza (Quicken Loans commercial); C. H. Greenblatt (Jellystone!; 2021–2025)

In-universe information
- Species: Brown bear
- Gender: Male
- Family: Unnamed parents; Unnamed brothers; Unnamed sister
- Significant other: Buttercup (girlfriend)

Boo-Boo Bear is a cartoon character on Hanna-Barbera's The Yogi Bear Show. Boo-Boo is a shorter anthropomorphic bear who wears a blue bowtie. Boo-Boo is Yogi Bear's constant companion (not his son, as sometimes believed), and often acts as his own conscience. He tries (usually unsuccessfully) to keep Yogi from doing things he should not do, and also to keep Yogi from getting into trouble with Ranger Smith – often saying, "Mr. Ranger isn't gonna like this, Yogi." It is currently unclear whether Boo-Boo is a juvenile bear with a precocious intellect, or simply an adult bear who is short of stature.

== History ==
=== Hanna-Barbera appearances ===
Boo-Boo first appeared along with Yogi in the "Yogi Bear" segment of The Huckleberry Hound Show in 1958; when Yogi was given his own series in 1961, Boo-Boo went with him.

Since then, Boo-Boo has remained at Yogi's side through almost all of the Hanna-Barbera series, movies, and specials in which Yogi appeared, the only exceptions being Yogi's Space Race and Galaxy Goof-Ups, in which Boo-Boo's place was taken by a new character named Scare Bear. Boo-Boo's classic voice actor was Don Messick, who also voiced Ranger Smith.

=== Other appearances ===
- Throughout the 1990s, Boo-Boo (voiced by Jeff Bergman and Billy West) usually appeared with Yogi in various Cartoon Network commercials and bumpers.
- In the Dexter's Laboratory episode "Chubby Cheese", an animatronic Boo-Boo can be seen on stage playing the trumpet with other Hanna-Barbera characters.
- Boo-Boo appears in the I Am Weasel episode "I Am My Lifetime", voiced by Tom Kenny.
- Spümcø has made a few parody cartoons starring Boo-Boo and other characters from the original Yogi Bear series, starting with 1999's Boo Boo Runs Wild. In this half-hour tale, Boo-Boo's nice-guy persona is heavily satirized with him simply being repressed by all of Ranger Smith's rules and regulations, and finds him regressing into a primal state, complete with typical bear-like urges and mannerisms. He was voiced by John Kricfalusi.
- Boo-Boo appears with Yogi Bear in The Grim Adventures of Billy & Mandy episode "Here Thar Be Dwarves!", voiced by Tom Kenny. He later appears in the episode "Irwin Gets a Clue" as one of several Hanna-Barbera characters to be run into by Hoss Delgado's truck.
- Boo-Boo appears in the Yogi Bear feature film, voiced by singer/actor Justin Timberlake. In the film, he has a pet frog-mouthed turtle named Turtle and must help Yogi save Jellystone (and Turtle) from Mayor R. Brown.
- Boo-Boo appears with Yogi Bear in the Harvey Birdman, Attorney at Law episode "Death by Chocolate", voiced by Tom Kenny and in other episodes in cameos.
- Boo-Boo appears in the Max series Jellystone, voiced by show creator C. H. Greenblatt. Boo-Boo is a nurse in the series. He and Yogi are revealed to be married in this series (for insurance reasons) in the 2-parter "Crisis on Infinite Mirths".
- Boo-Boo appears with Yogi Bear in the Robot Chicken episode "Ban on the Fun", voiced by Victor Yerrid. In a segment that parodies Laff-A-Lympics in the style of the Munich massacre, the Really Rottens shoot the Yogi Yahooeys to death as retribution for losing to them so many times. Boo-Boo later appeared in a movie trailer segment that parodies the Rambo franchise from the episode "President Evil", voiced by Yerrid once again. He was later featured in the sketch "Power Forest Rangers" of the show's 100th episode "Fight Club Paradise", voiced by series creator Seth Green.
- Boo-Boo appears with Yogi Bear in the Animaniacs segment "Suffragette City".
- On May 10, 2021, Boo-Boo and Yogi appeared in a commercial advertisement for GEICO stealing food from a family cookout in "bear country".
- Boo-Boo, along with Yogi, appears in the 2021 film Space Jam: A New Legacy. They were among the Warner Bros. characters that were making their way to the site of the basketball game between the Tune Squad and the Goon Squad. Boo-Boo watches from atop Yogi's shoulders.
- Boo-Boo appears with Yogi in the Teen Titans Go! episode "Warner Bros. 100th Anniversary".

== Portrayers ==
From the time of the character's debut until 1996, the character was voiced by Don Messick, who died in 1997.

In the Yogi Bear film, the character is voiced by singer/actor Justin Timberlake.

Scott Innes performed the voice Boo Boo along with Yogi Bear in At Picnic, Forest, and Honey Lesson.

== Animated media ==
=== Television shows ===
- The Huckleberry Hound Show (1958–1960)
- The Yogi Bear Show (1961–1962)
- Yogi Bear & Friends (1967–1968)
- Yogi's Gang (1973)
- Laff-A-Lympics (1977–1979)
- Yogi's Treasure Hunt (1985–1986)
- The New Yogi Bear Show (1988)
- Wake, Rattle, and Roll (1990–1991)
- Yo Yogi! (1991)
- Boo Boo Runs Wild and A Day in the Life of Ranger Smith (1999)
- Boo Boo and the Man (2002)
- Jellystone! (2021–2025)

=== Films and specials ===
- Hey There, It's Yogi Bear (1964) (singing voice by Ernie Newton)
- Yogi's Ark Lark (1972)
- Casper's First Christmas (1979)
- Yogi's First Christmas (1980)
- Yogi Bear's All Star Comedy Christmas Caper (1982)
- Yogi's Great Escape (1987)
- Yogi Bear and the Magical Flight of the Spruce Goose (1987)
- Yogi and the Invasion of the Space Bears (1988)
- The Good, the Bad, and Huckleberry Hound (1988)
- Hanna-Barbera's 50th: A Yabba Dabba Doo Celebration (1989)
- Yogi the Easter Bear (1994)
- Arabian Nights (1994) (final time voiced by Don Messick)
- Yogi Bear a live-action/animated film released in 3-D on December 17, 2010 (voiced by Justin Timberlake)
- Space Jam: A New Legacy (2021)

=== Video games ===
- Yogi Bear: Great Balloon Blast (2000)
- Yogi Bear: The Video Game (2010)

== See also ==
- List of Hanna-Barbera characters
- List of Boo-Boo Bear live action voice actors
- List of Yogi Bear characters
- Yogi Bear (disambiguation)
- The Yogi Bear Show
- The New Yogi Bear Show
- Yogi's Gang
- Yogi's Treasure Hunt
- Yo Yogi!
