= Magilla Gorilla =

American animated television character

- The Magilla Gorilla Show character
- First appearance: "The Big Game"
- Created by: William Hanna; Joseph Barbera
- Voiced by: Allan Melvin (1964–1994); Daws Butler (1973); Jeff Bergman (Web Premiere Toons, 2001-present); Maurice LaMarche (Harvey Birdman, Attorney at Law); Frank Welker (Scooby-Doo and Guess Who?); Paul F. Tompkins (Jellystone!, 2021–2025)

In-universe information
- Species: Western Lowland Gorilla
- Gender: Male

Magilla Gorilla is a fictional gorilla and the star of The Magilla Gorilla Show by Hanna-Barbera that aired from 1964 to 1967. The original show (broadcast Jan. 1964 to Sept. 1965) featured 31 half-hour episodes each consisting of 3 separate cartoons (starring "Magilla Gorilla", "Punkin Puss" and "Ricochet Rabbit").

== Character description ==
Magilla Gorilla (voiced by Allan Melvin) is a fun-loving yet trouble-prone anthropomorphic Western gorilla who spends his time languishing in the front display window of Melvin Peebles' pet shop, eating bananas and being a drain on the shop's finances. Peebles (voiced by Howard Morris and later by Don Messick) frequently marks down his price considerably, but purchasers of Magilla always ended up returning him due to Magilla's antics or other circumstances, forcing Peebles to give a refund; Magilla would often end episodes with his catchphrase "We'll try again next week!"

Like many of Hanna-Barbera's animal characters, Magilla Gorilla sported human accessories: a purple bow tie, red shorts held up by green suspenders, a purple undersized derby hat, and brown dress shoes.

The only customer truly interested in owning Magilla was a little girl named Ogee (voiced by Jean Vander Pyl and pronounced "Oh Gee!"). During the cartoon's theme song, "We've Got a Gorilla for Sale," she asks hopefully, "How much is that gorilla in the window?" (a twist on the old standard, "(How Much Is) That Doggie in the Window?", but she was never able to convince her parents to let her keep him.

In Yiddish, a megillah is a long, tedious, or embroidered account, from the Hebrew megillah, a story written in a scroll. The first episode "Big Game" has Magilla saying, "Such a megillah over a gorilla."

== Episodes ==
=== Season 1 (1964) ===
No. overall	No. in season	Title	Original release date
1	1	"Big Game"	January 14, 1964
Peebles sells Magilla to J. Whimple Dimple, who is intent on hunting the gorilla for his taxidermy collection.
2	2	"Gridiron Gorilla"	January 21, 1964
Peebles gives Magilla away to a football coach, who recruits him as a fullback in the Pennsyltucky Lions team against the Wabash Cannonballs.
3	3	"Private Magilla"	January 28, 1964
Magilla has been drafted into the US Army. He performs so well at his duty that Private Gorilla is slated for a special mission: being the first American to land on the Moon.
4	4	"Bank Pranks"	February 4, 1964
Peebles sells Magilla to a couple of thieves who are hoping to make use of him, but Magilla foils their robbery attempt.
5	5	"Groovey Movie"	February 11, 1964
The director of Grotesque Pictures buys Magilla for his newest motion picture, but the showbiz proves to be painful for Magilla.
6	6	"Airlift"	February 18, 1964
Magilla drinks Professor Skiball's anti-gravity formula, making him float up in the air, and some advertisers take advantage of this.
7	7	"Come Blow Your Dough"	February 25, 1964
A little girl called Ogee buys Magilla. Upon bringing him home, Ogee's parents reject Magilla and call the police.
8	8	"Mad Scientist"	March 3, 1964
Peebles sells Magilla to a mad scientist who takes the gorilla to his laboratory to perform some sinister experiments on his brain.
9	9	"Masquerade Party"	March 10, 1964
Magilla is invited to a dressing up party where two thieves are attempting to steal Mrs. Richley's diamond necklace.
10	10	"Come Back Little Magilla"	March 17, 1964
Upset that she can't have Magilla, Ogee runs away and Magilla goes after her, thinking of her safety. This episode is a sequel of the episode "Come Blow Your Dough".
11	11	"Fairy Godmother"	March 24, 1964
Magilla's fairy godmother grants Magilla three wishes. The first to go to the jungle, the second to go back, and the third to get a lot of bananas.
12	12	"Planet Zero"	March 31, 1964
Inhabitants from Planet Zero take Magilla to their home planet where he makes them too afraid to invade earth.
13	13	"Prince Charming"	April 7, 1964
Ogee visits Magilla who entertains her with various fairy tales involving the masked stranger and Prince Charming.
14	14	"Motorcycle Magilla"	April 14, 1964
Magilla drives off with Peebles in his motorcycle all over the town, until they plunge off a waterfall and get rescued by a helicopter.
15	15	"Is That Zoo?"	April 21, 1964
Peebles sends Magilla to the City Zoo where he has to follow the rules, but he takes them a bit too seriously.

=== Season 2 (1965) ===
No. overall	No. in season	Title	Original release date
16	1	"Bird Brained"	September 11, 1965
Peebles brings to Magilla a lovebird, which attempts to escape. Magilla chases the bird to take him back before Peebles gets back with a mate for him.
17	2	"Circus Ruckus"	September 18, 1965
Magilla runs away to join a circus after Peebles scolded him. Soon, Magilla misses Peebles and comes back to the pet shop after being blasted out of a cannon.
18	3	"Camp Scamps"	September 25, 1965
Magilla mistakenly thinks Peebles is going to get rid of him, so he joins the junior rangers of Camp Kitchy Gooney.
19	4	"The Purple Mask"	October 2, 1965
Ogee gets upset as she can't prove the existence of the Purple Mask to Hector. Magilla takes the place of the superhero to help Ogee.
20	5	"Love at First Fight"	October 9, 1965
Magilla is taken to the City Zoo to keep a lonely gorilla called Matilda company, but she falls madly in love with him.
21	6	"Pet Bet"	October 16, 1965
Ogee visits Peebles' pet shop to take Magilla to her school pet contest. A dog called Horatio is all who stands between Magilla and the trophy prize.
22	7	"Makin' with the Magilla"	October 23, 1965
Magilla goes on a long surfing stunt at the beach and as a result becomes the Surfer King. Contains the song "Makin' with The Magilla" recorded by Little Eva.
23	8	"High Fly Guy"	October 30, 1965
While out shopping, Magilla rides on a kiddie airplane, but it accidentally sends him into the sky and he flies past a movie studio, an airport, and through a mall.
24	9	"Deep Sea Doodle"	November 6, 1965
Peebles sends Magilla to take his sick goldfish to the Oceanland doctor. During the check up, Magilla gets tangled in the aquarium where one of the antics involves him getting attacked by a shark.
25	10	"That Was the Geek That Was"	November 13, 1965
Magilla delivers to Peebles a rare pet bird, but it vanishes. Magilla tries hard to catch the slippery bird.
26	11	"Montana Magilla"	November 20, 1965
In order to help a bankrupt Peebles, Magilla enters a cowboy contest under the name Montana Magilla to win the money he needs.
27	12	"Magilla Mix-Up"	November 27, 1965
During an errand for Peebles, Magilla is mistaken for a secret agent in a secret hideout and is tailed by a villain on a secret delivery service.
28	13	"Wheelin' and Dealin'"	December 4, 1965
Magilla accidentally drives off with a man's sports car, causing a commotion and getting himself in trouble with the police. Don Messick provides the voice of Mr. Peebles after Howard Morris left the show.
29	14	"Mad Avenue Madness"	December 11, 1965
Peebles rents Magilla to some Advertisers from Madison Avenue to accomplish their advertising campaign of a Huffmobile.
30	15	"Beau Jest"	December 18, 1965
Feeling unwanted, Magilla leaves Peebles and becomes involved with the French Legion, sent on a mission to capture the bandit Abu Ben Hakim.
31	16	"Super Blooper Heroes"	December 25, 1965
Inspired by Super Magnificent on TV, Magilla and Peebles become crime fighting superheroes. Unfortunately, they pick the wrong guys to fight.

== Inception ==
As pointed out on the Rhino Records' CD liner notes for their collection of Hanna-Barbera theme tunes, part of Magilla's purpose was to sell likenesses of himself. The show was sponsored by Ideal Toys, which produced a Magilla stuffed toy.

== Other appearances ==
A rebooted Magilla Gorilla interacts with Nightwing. From the Nightwing/Magilla Gorilla Special #1.

- Magilla appeared in the medium of comic books. From 1964 through 1968, he appeared in a series published by Western Comics; the series ran 10 issues. Also in 1964, he appeared in a one shot comic called The Magilla Gorilla Kite Fun Book from the same publisher. From 1970 through 1971, he appeared in a series published by Charlton Comics which ran 5 issues.
- Magilla appeared on both the 1972 made-for-TV movie Yogi's Ark Lark and the 1973 spin-off Yogi's Gang series, where he would run the treadmill that powers the Ark as long as there are plenty of bananas.
- In the 1982 special Yogi Bear's All Star Comedy Christmas Caper, Magilla (alongside Wally Gator and Yakky Doodle) was unable to help Yogi and his friends locate J. Wellington Jones.
- Magilla appeared in the 1985-1988 syndicated series Yogi's Treasure Hunt.
- Magilla made a cameo appearance as an HB reporter in the 1988 TV-movie The Good, the Bad, and Huckleberry Hound.
- Magilla appeared in A Yabba-Dabba-Doo Celebration! 50 Years of Hanna-Barbera.
- In the "Fender Bender 500" segment of the 1990 series Wake, Rattle, and Roll, Magilla was partnered with Wally Gator as they rode a monster truck called the Swamp Stomper.
- In Yo Yogi!, Magilla appeared as superstar rapper Magilla Ice (a spoof of Vanilla Ice).
- Magilla appeared as Sinbad on the 1994 TV special Scooby-Doo! in Arabian Nights.
- In Harvey Birdman: Attorney At Law, Magilla (voiced by Maurice LaMarche) made several appearances through the show, sometimes appearing as a homosexual prison inmate who is frequently seen stalking Harvey Birdman. In the 2005 episode "Free Magilla", Magilla is kidnapped by radical animal rights activists causing Mr. Peebles (also voiced by Maurice LaMarche) to sue them. Magilla is quickly abandoned by the activists after they grow sick of his many puns. During the course of the episode, Mr. Peebles confesses to having grown attached to Magilla.
- Magilla Gorilla made a cameo in a 2012 MetLife commercial entitled "Everyone".
- Magilla and Mr. Peebles make cameos in the 2013 direct-to-video film Scooby-Doo! Mask of the Blue Falcon as images in the Hanna-Barbera convention.
- Magilla made a cameo in the Mad segment "Demise of the Planet of the Apes", where he is one of the occupants of the Super Ape Motel.
- In 2018, DC Comics rebooted Magilla Gorilla into a less cartoonish character and featured him in a crossover with Nightwing titled Nightwing/Magilla Gorilla Special #1. This version of Magilla is a famous actor living with Mr. Peebles who goes by the name Mel Peebles and gets murdered and Magilla is framed for the crime.
- Magilla and Mr. Peebles appear in the Scooby-Doo and Guess Who? episode "Peebles' Pet Shop of Terrible Terrors" with Magilla Gorilla voiced by Frank Welker and Mr. Peebles voiced by Billy West. Magilla's ability to speak is downplayed by just making sounds and quoting "uh-huh." He is also shown to know how to use sign language. Both Peebles and Magilla are redesigned to match the 1970s look of Scooby-Doo. Wanda Sykes volunteers at Peebles' Pet Supply Mega-Store when a Fish Monster (vocal effects provided by Dee Bradley Baker) hatches from an egg and starts terrorizing the pet shop. In addition, Mr. Peebles has a bookkeeper named Arnie (also voiced by Billy West) working at his pet shop. Mystery Inc. helps solve the mystery of the Fish Monster. From the shadows, Magilla secretly gathers the pets that got loose and puts them back in their cages. With help from Magilla, Mystery Inc. and Wanda trap the Fish Monster and discover that the Fish Monster is actually Mr. Peebles, who wanted to have his pet shop closed so that he can finally get rid of Magilla, (who Mr. Peebles claimed ate him out of house and home for 30 years during the timeline of the original The Magilla Gorilla Show.) and start his own clothing line for short and small people. After Mr. Peebles is arrested by the police, Arnie becomes the new owner of Peebles' Pet Supply Mega-Store and Wanda adopts Magilla.
- Magilla makes a cameo appearance in the 2020 Animaniacs revival segment "Suffragette City".
- Magilla appeared in the 2021 film Space Jam: A New Legacy. He is seen watching the basketball game between the Tune Squad and the Goon Squad where he is shown riding a unicycle on the wires of an overhead power line.
- Magilla and Mr. Peebles appear in the HBO Max original series Jellystone!, with Magilla voiced by Paul F. Tompkins. In this show, Magilla wears glasses and runs a clothing store in this series that Jabberjaw and Loopy De Loop works in. A running gag is that Jabberjaw pronounces his name as "Ma-Jilla" rather than the actual pronunciation.
- Mr. Peebles appeared in the 2021 special Scooby-Doo, Where Are You Now!
- Magilla appeared in the Teen Titans Go! episode "Warner Bros. 100th Anniversary".

== Cultural references ==
- The Brazilian boxer Adilson Rodrigues called himself "Maguila" after the cartoon.

== Magilla Gorilla in other languages ==
- Brazilian Portuguese: Maguila, o Gorila
- European Portuguese: O Show do Gorila Maguila
- Greek: The same as in English
- French: Maguilla le gorille
- Italian: The same as in English
- Spanish: Maguila Gorila
- Japanese: ゴリラのゴンちゃん (Gorira no Gon-chan)
- Finnish: The same as in English
- Hungarian: The same as in English
- Polish: Goryl Magilla (pronouncing with double "l")

== See also ==
- List of fictional primates
