= The Good, the Bad, and Huckleberry Hound =

1988 animated Western TV film

- Title card.
- Genre: Comedy; Western
- Written by: John Ludin; Tom Ruegger
- Directed by: Bob Goe; John Kimball; Charles A. Nichols; Jay Sarbry
- Voices of: Daws Butler; Charlie Adler; Michael Bell; Pat Buttram; Pat Fraley; Allan Melvin; Don Messick; Howard Morris; B. J. Ward; Frank Welker
- Composer: Sven Libaek
- Country of origin: United States
- Original language: English

Production
- Executive producers: William Hanna; Joseph Barbera
- Producer: Charles Grosvenor
- Editor: Gil Iverson
- Running time: 95 minutes
- Production company: Hanna-Barbera Productions

Original release
- Network: Syndication
- Release: May 6, 1988

The Good, the Bad, and Huckleberry Hound is a 1988 animated Western television film produced by Hanna-Barbera for syndication as part of the Hanna-Barbera Superstars 10 series. This film marks the final time Daws Butler voiced Huckleberry Hound, Quick Draw McGraw and Baba Looey, Snagglepuss, Hokey Wolf, and Peter Potamus, as he died a couple weeks after its telecast from a heart attack (his final Yogi Bear performance, in Yogi and the Invasion of the Space Bears, would air in November of that year).

The film parodies various Western films (in a manner akin to Blazing Saddles) and its title is a take-off of The Good, the Bad and the Ugly. Huckleberry is constantly referred to as a "mysterious, steely-eyed, and silent-type stranger" (though Huck is just being himself), spoofing the Western stock character of the Man with No Name. Several other plot points are lifted from well-known film Westerns, such as High Noon and High Plains Drifter. The setting of the film is 1849 California, during the California Gold Rush.

This is the only movie in the Superstars 10 series where Huckleberry is the main character, with Dinky Dalton from Laff-A-Lympics being featured.

== Plot ==
In 1849 California, Huckleberry Hound, being known by others as the Mysterious, Steely-Eyed, and Silent-Type Stranger, rides west on his horse in search of a place to start a country farm. He discovers the small town of Two-Bit, which is being menaced by the outlaw brothers, the Dalton Gang consisting of Dinky, Finky, Pinky, and Stinky. Stinky was apprehended by a hand and sentenced to prison by Judge Tumbleweed Flopner.

The Daltons steal Huck's belongings and coerce him into a game of poker, the stakes being a gold nugget Huck carries for his things. Huck accuses the Daltons of cheating, so they challenge him to a boxing match which Huck wins. Huck goes to Quick Draw McGraw and Baba Looey's bank to deposit his gold and wins a prize of his choice. He chooses a fountain pen, being partial to its blue ink. The Daltons rob the bank, stealing the nugget and the pen. Mayor Hokey Wolf calls an emergency town meeting and hurriedly appoints Huck as Two-Bit's new sheriff.

Sheriff Huck hunts the Daltons and apprehends and jails them after some struggle. Stinky breaks out of prison with the Bit-2 News and reporter Magilla Gorilla covering the news. Huck receives a letter from Stinky Dalton. Stinky challenges Huck to a gunfight. None of the townsfolk want to help and flee to Tahiti.

Stinky fails to kill Huck, so he breaks his brothers out of jail disguised as their grandmother. Despite his horse trying to rescue him, Huck chases the Daltons until they strap him to a rocket and launch him into the sky, where he is presumably blown up. The Daltons go on to become the richest outlaws in the West, taking over Two-Bit and renaming it "Daltonville". When the townsfolk return, the Daltons kick them out aboard a freight train and the townsfolk blame themselves for Huck's death and the loss of Two-Bit.

After a recap of what has happened, it is shown the rocket crashed at a tribal community of Native American dogs. Huck survives with amnesia and is found by the chief's daughter, Desert Flower. The two fall in love and Huck proposes marriage, but first Huck must undergo a two-part test for the chief's blessing. The first test is a game show which Huck wins despite the chief meddling with his buzzer. For the second test, Huck has to wrestle Chuckling Chipmunk, the tribe's strongest man and Desert Flower's rival suitor. Huck loses, but saves Desert Flower when she falls in a river earning the chief's blessing. Huck is about to undergo the ceremony when his horse returns and restores his memory, reminding him that the Daltons are still at large while also mentioning that his real name is Bob. Huck promises to return for Desert Flower and departs.

Huck finds the townsfolk of Two-Bit working at a circus and urges them to help him take back their town. Recruiting a projectionist and showgirl Rusty Nails, Huck plans to use special effects to pose as a ghost and scare the Daltons away. Rusty shows a film to the Daltons warning that Huck's ghost will arrive in Daltonville on the "midnight ghost train". The Daltons are terrified except for Stinky, who refuses to be intimidated. Huck arrives aboard the train and scares the Daltons, including Stinky, but they refuse to go to jail. The Two-Bit townsfolk chase them into the state prison, disguised as the Daltons' hideout. Huck reveals his ruse and is congratulated for bringing the Daltons to justice.

The narrator revealed what happened to Huck and the townsfolk after riding off into the sunset:

- Snagglepuss back working as a theater actor.
- Quick Draw becomes Two-Bit's new sheriff with Baba Looey as his deputy.
- Hokey Wolf runs a Used Wagon Lot in Two Bit.
- Yogi and Boo Boo return to Jellystone Park.
- Huck returns to the tribe to marry Desert Flower, starting his farm and raising a family with her.

== Voice cast ==
- Charlie Adler as Pinky Dalton, Pig, TV Announcer from Bit-2 News, Additional Voices
- Michael Bell as Stinky Dalton, Bailiff, Laughing Donkey, Longhorn Steer and Station Announcer
- Daws Butler as Huckleberry Hound, Yogi Bear, Quick Draw McGraw, Snagglepuss, Peter Potamus, Baba Looey, Hokey Wolf
- Pat Buttram as Red Eye the Bartender
- Pat Fraley as Finky Dalton, Autograph Boy, Baby, Boy, and Rooster
- Allan Melvin as Magilla Gorilla, Dinky Dalton, Devil, Game Show Announcer, Spooky Movie Narrator
- Don Messick as Boo Boo and Narrator
- Howard Morris as Mr. Peebles, Chuckling Chipmunk, Goldminer, Dentist, Governor, Photographer
- B. J. Ward as Desert Flower, Chieftess, Rusty Nails, Elderly Lady and Girl
- Frank Welker as Bob (Huckleberry's Horse), Chief, Judge Tumbleweed Flopner, Mission Control, Race Track Announcer

=== Cameo appearances ===
In addition to the characters mentioned above, the following Hanna-Barbera characters briefly appear in the movie:

- Snooper, Muttley, and Doggie Daddy are in the "audience" when Huck is trying to decide which prize to accept from the bank.

== Home media ==
On November 25, 1988, The Good, the Bad, and Huckleberry Hound was released on VHS videocassette by Hanna-Barbera Home Video in the United States. On August 9, 2011, Warner Archive released the movie on DVD in NTSC picture format with all region encoding, as part of their Hanna–Barbera Classics Collection. This is a Manufacture-on-Demand (MOD) release, available exclusively through Warner's online store and Amazon.com.

The film was released on Blu-ray as part of a Hanna-Barbera Superstars 10 boxset through Warner Archive on February 20, 2024. The film was remastered in HD.

== See also ==
- Hanna-Barbera Superstars 10
- The Huckleberry Hound Show
- The Quick Draw McGraw Show
- The Yogi Bear Show
- The Magilla Gorilla Show
