= Yogi Bear and the Three Stooges Meet the Mad, Mad, Mad Dr. No-No =

Studio album by The Three Stooges
- Released: 1966
- Genre: Comedy
- Label: Hanna-Barbera Records
- Producer: Hanna-Barbera

Yogi Bear and the Three Stooges Meet the Mad, Mad, Mad Dr. No-No is a 1966 comedy album produced and released by Hanna-Barbera Records. The album presents The Three Stooges (Moe Howard, Larry Fine and Curly-Joe DeRita) as inept park rangers who are called upon to rescue Yogi Bear (played by Daws Butler) after he is kidnapped by Dr. No-No, a nefarious scientist who invented a machine that turns people into animals. This was the final album recorded by the Three Stooges.

== Plot ==
Disturbed by the fact that Yogi Bear (Butler) has escaped from Jellystone Park yet again, and with the full knowledge that Yogi is the park's star attraction, the park rangers (all voiced by Butler) receive a telegram from President Lyndon Johnson in Washington, D.C. telling them that they are sending the Forest Service's three finest rangers: the Three Stooges. To prevent Yogi from leaving again, the Stooges resolve to live with Yogi all day and night.

Yogi calls a costume service and disguises himself as an old lady, duping the Stooges into escorting him out of the park. After escaping, a storm hits, and Yogi becomes lost and delusional, carrying along a dialogue with himself. Yogi stumbles upon the secret laboratory of Dr. No-No, a Vincent Pricesque mad scientist, and his deranged Igor-like henchman, Fang (both voiced by Butler). Dr. No-No is bent on turning Yogi into a chicken with his invention, a molecule mixer that scrambles life forms and turns them into other animals.

The Stooges follow Yogi's trail to the laboratory. Unable to get past the electric fence, Fang brings them in to test the molecule mixer on humans. Presented with a chicken that Dr. No-No claims is Yogi, Moe is unconvinced, even after Dr. No-No demonstrates the mixer by turning one of his watchdogs into a cow. Curly-Joe and Larry nominate Moe to try the mixer himself. The machine slightly malfunctions, turning Moe into a gorilla instead of the intended monkey, but Dr. No-No is satisfied enough to pursue further world domination. Moe, unlike Yogi, is still able to talk, and the Stooges devise a scheme to thwart Dr. No-No using Moe's gorilla strength. Under threat of violence, Dr. No-No agrees to change Yogi and Moe back.

To prevent Dr. No-No from rebuilding the machine after they destroy it, they use the machine to turn Dr. No-No into a duck (at Yogi's suggestion; the Stooges had suggested a jackass) and bring the duck, along with Yogi, back to Jellystone.

== Production notes ==
Don Messick does not appear on the album, and thus the two supporting characters from the Yogi Bear cartoons that Messick voiced, Ranger Smith and Boo Boo Bear, are absent. Butler instead voiced unnamed park rangers in Smith's stead. A dialogue between Yogi and Boo Boo was hastily rewritten as a monologue, making it seem as if a delirious Yogi is talking with himself.
