= Vance Colvig =

American actor (1918–1991)

- Colvig in 1926
- Born: Vance DeBar Colvig Jr. March 9, 1918; San Francisco, California, U.S.
- Died: March 4, 1991 (aged 72); Los Angeles, California, U.S.
- Other name: Pinto Colvig Jr.
- Education: Oregon State University
- Occupations: Actor; writer; animator; producer
- Years active: 1938–1991
- Spouse: Virginia G. Arslanian
- Children: 1
- Parent(s): Vance "Pinto" Colvig Sr. Margaret Bourke Slavin

Vance DeBar Colvig Jr. (March 9, 1918 – March 4, 1991) was an American actor and writer. He voiced Chopper the Bulldog on The Yogi Bear Show. In the 1980s, he made guest appearances in various films, television series, and music videos.

== Career ==
Colvig began his career as a page at NBC. In the 1940s, he became a writer for such radio shows as Breakfast in Hollywood, Command Performance, and Bride and Groom.

On January 5, 1959, he became the first to portray Bozo the Clown on a franchised Bozo program licensed by Larry Harmon. In the role that his father Pinto Colvig first portrayed on Capitol Records in 1946 and KTTV-TV in Los Angeles in 1949, Vance portrayed the whiteface clown Bozo on KTLA-TV in Los Angeles from 1959 to 1964.

His best known cartoon voice is of Chopper the Bulldog, Yakky Doodle's best friend and protector on The Yogi Bear Show.

He worked primarily as a character actor in numerous performances spanning the 1980s; many roles subtly express his clowning talent. He made guest appearances on TV shows including The Golden Girls, Hill Street Blues, and St. Elsewhere. One of his last film roles is as a bum opposite "Weird Al" Yankovic in the 1989 cult comedy film UHF. He appeared on a 1990 episode of the TV series Night Court playing a bum. He enjoyed playing several characters at Knott's Berry Farm amusement park and at trade shows.

He appeared in commercials and music videos. His cameo appearances in music videos include David Lee Roth's 1985 cover of "Just a Gigolo" as a female cleaner, and Gregg Allman's 1987 "I'm No Angel" as a gas station attendant.

He identifies himself by name on the second Negativland album Points (1981). On the track "A Nice Place to Live", his live remote broadcasts from the Los Angeles and Contra Costa county fairs are sampled.

== Personal life ==
Colvig was married to Virginia G. Arslanian until his death in 1991. They had a son, Vance DeBar Colvig III.

== Death ==
Colvig died on March 4, 1991, of cancer at his Hollywood Hills home, five days shy of his 73rd birthday.

== Select works ==
=== Film and television ===
- The Quick Draw McGraw Show (1959, TV Series) — Narrator / Tombstone Jones (voices)
- The Yogi Bear Show (1961, TV Series) — Chopper (voice)
- Death Valley Days (1966, TV Series) — Dusty
- Fred Flintstone and Friends (1977-1978, TV Series)
- For the Love of It (1980, TV Movie) — Old Hippie
- American Pop (1981) — Hobo #1
- St. Elsewhere (1982-1984, TV Series) — Bum / Mr. Pechar
- Three's a Crowd (1985, TV Series) — Wino
- The Boys Next Door (1985) — Old Man
- Amazing Stories (1985, TV Series) — Vaudevillian #1
- My Chauffeur (1986) — Doolittle
- Odd Jobs (1986) — Chairman
- Barfly (1986) — Alcoholic Man
- Yogi's Treasure Hunt (1986-1987, TV Series) — Chopper (voice)
- Maid to Order (1987) — Man with Newspaper
- Dudes (1987) — Hezekiah
- Boys Will Be Boys (1987, TV Series)
- Pass the Ammo (1988) — Fritz
- Crime Story (1988, TV Series) — Billy Jones
- Track 29 (1988) — Me. Ennis
- Mortuary Academy (1988) — Uncle Willard
- Arizona Heat (1988) — Mr. Gordon
- Big Top Pee-wee (1988) — Clownie
- All's Fair (1989) — Old Man
- Hard Time on Planet Earth (1989, TV Series) — Fan #2
- UHF (1989) — Bum
- Night Court (1990, TV Series) — Bum
- Mother Goose Rock 'n' Rhyme (1990, TV Movie) — Dungeon Warden
- The New Adam-12 (1991, TV Series) — Wino
- Boris and Natasha: The Movie (1992, TV Movie) — One-Eyed Man (final film role, posthumous release)

=== Radio ===
- Breakfast in Hollywood (1941–1948) — Writer
- Command Performance (1942–1949) — Writer
- Bride and Groom (1945–1950) — Writer
