= Yogi's First Christmas =

1980 American animated musical television film

- Cover art
- Genre: Family; Comedy
- Written by: Willie Gilbert
- Directed by: Ray Patterson; Rudy Cataldi (uncredited)
- Voices of: Daws Butler; Don Messick; Janet Waldo; Marilyn Schreffler; John Stephenson; Hal Smith
- Country of origin: United States
- Original language: English

Production
- Executive producers: William Hanna; Joseph Barbera
- Producer: Lew Marshall
- Running time: 98 minutes
- Production company: Hanna-Barbera Productions

Original release
- Network: Syndication
- Release: November 22, 1980

Yogi's First Christmas is a 1980 American animated musical television film starring Yogi Bear and produced by Hanna-Barbera Productions. It first aired in syndication through Operation Prime Time on November 22, 1980. Throughout the 1980s, it was offered to U.S. television stations split up one episode per day for four days as a one-week strip syndicated program, generally during the week of Christmas. The film was written by Willie Gilbert and directed by Ray Patterson.

In keeping with Hanna-Barbera's limited animation techniques, the special didn't have the full animation of a theatrical feature like 1964's Hey There, It's Yogi Bear, but was regardless more detailed and elaborate than their standard TV work.

== Plot ==
Every Christmas Huckleberry Hound, Snagglepuss, Augie Doggie and Doggie Daddy spend the holiday at the Jellystone Lodge right next door to Jellystone Park and they're upset that Yogi Bear and Boo-Boo Bear have to hibernate during the holiday, but Ranger Smith who carpools everyone to the lodge tells them that they had a lot of trouble the Christmas before. When they got to the lodge they meet lodge manager Mr. Dingwell who tells them that because of what happened the year before, this could be the last Christmas they'll have at the lodge because the town is planning to build a freeway where the lodge is unless Mrs. Sophie Throckmorton who owns the lodge sells it to the town. Also business at the lodge is going downhill with other regular guests not returning for the holiday season; however if Mrs. Throckmorton (who is bringing her spoiled nephew Snively along with her) can enjoy the stay without any mischief, then she'll remain owner of the lodge.

Yogi and Boo Boo are put to work as employees of the lodge when the music wakes them up and they enter the lodge through the kitchen where Otto works. Yogi has to escape when Ranger Smith wants to take him back home, and he does this on the snowplow with which he saves Mrs. Throckmorton on the road from an avalanche caused by Herman the Hermit who hates Christmas. Later, Yogi is working as a bellhop, where he is tasked by Ranger Smith to stay on Mrs. Throckmorton's good side.

Though Snively tries to embarrass Yogi with his pranks, Yogi comes out on top. In another attempt to degrade Yogi, Snively tricks him into entering a figure skating contest, in which Snively is also a participant. Although Snively earns high marks, Mrs. Throckmorton covertly wishes Snively would lose in order to tame his poor attitude. Yogi, the last contestant, clumsily manages to impress the judges well enough to earn the highest marks and win. Snively is a sore loser and enraged that Yogi beat him at his own game, but his aunt Sophie says that Yogi won fair and square and losing is a lesson of life.

Following different situations caused by Herman that Yogi saved her from, Mrs. Throckmorton has Mr. Dingwell promote Yogi to chief of security. Cindy Bear also awakens from her hibernation, to help Yogi out (due to her love and concern for him). Fed up with Snively's antics, Yogi retaliates during an ice fishing contest, with Mrs. Throckmorton agreeing that he needed to be taught a lesson. Furious, Snively runs away and meets up with Herman, and the two team up to ruin Christmas. It was revealed that Herman was the one who caused the trouble at the lodge the previous Christmas. However, Yogi manages to thwart them every time, albeit unknowingly.

Eventually Herman and Snively were caught by Ranger Smith who threatens to arrest Herman and because of Snively's behavior, Mrs. Throckmorton punishes him from the Christmas party.

However Herman and Snively team up again and realizes the true meaning of Christmas, they're brought into the party by Yogi and they apologize for their actions. Then in the midst of the festivities, Santa Claus plummets down the chimney. Santa admits that there were times when Yogi was not very good by way of stealing food from parkgoers, but also sees Yogi did much good. Santa gives Yogi his very own picnic basket full of food. Yogi, however, falls asleep, due to his natural instincts of hibernation. Santa then says that Yogi and Boo Boo can have the basket when they wake up in the spring. With that, the partiers return Yogi, Boo Boo and Cindy to their caves for the rest of their hibernation.

== Cast ==
- Daws Butler - Yogi Bear, Snagglepuss, Huckleberry Hound, and Augie Doggie
- Don Messick - Boo Boo, Ranger John Smith, and Herman the Hermit
- John Stephenson - Doggie Daddy, and Mr. Marty Dingwell
- Janet Waldo - Cindy Bear, and Sophie Throckmorton
- Marilyn Schreffler - Snively
- Hal Smith - Otto the Chef, and Santa Claus
- Sue Allen, Paul DeKorte, Edie Lehmann, Marilyn Powell, Andrea Robinson, John Richard Bolks, Darlene Lawrence, Michael Redman, and Ida Sue McCune - The Chorus

== Music ==
Two songs from Casper's First Christmas ("Comin' Up Christmas Time" and "Making a Big To-Do") are featured here, in new re-recorded versions. Additionally, "Hope" was previously heard in two previous Christmas specials, A Christmas Story (1972) and A Flintstone Christmas (1977). Four songs were released by Kid Rhino Records on the album Hanna-Barbera's Christmas Sing-A-Long in 1991, currently available on various streaming services.

1. "Comin' Up Christmas Time" – Chorus
2. "It's Your First Christmas" – Huckleberry, Snagglepuss, Boo Boo, Doggie Daddy and Chorus
3. "Hope" – Boo Boo
4. "Carols" – Chorus
5. "The Mistletoe Song" – Cindy
6. "Mean, Sour, Nasty and Cruel" – Herman and Snively
7. "Making a Big To-Do" – Chorus
8. "I've Been Kissed" – Cindy
9. "Christmas Is Here" – Chorus

== Home media ==
The holiday TV movie was first released on VHS via Worldvision Home Video in 1983, and later re-released in association with Kids Klassics Home Video in 1986. It was then released on DVD as part of the manufactured-on-demand Warner Archive Collection on November 17, 2009.

== See also ==
- The Huckleberry Hound Show
- The Yogi Bear Show
- The Quick Draw McGraw Show
- Casper's First Christmas
- Yogi Bear's All Star Comedy Christmas Caper

== Follow-up film ==
A follow-up film, Yogi Bear's All Star Comedy Christmas Caper, aired on CBS on December 21, 1982.
