= Snooper and Blabber =

American animated television series

- Super Snooper (left) and Blabber Mouse (right) on the segment's title card.
- Genre: Comedy; Detective fiction
- Written by: Michael Maltese
- Directed by: William Hanna; Joseph Barbera
- Voices of: Daws Butler
- Country of origin: United States
- Original language: English
- No. of seasons: 3
- No. of episodes: 45

Production
- Producers: William Hanna; Joseph Barbera
- Production company: Hanna-Barbera Productions

Original release
- Release: September 19, 1959 – October 20, 1961

Snooper and Blabber is one of the three component segments of The Quick Draw McGraw Show. The 45 individual shorts were produced by Hanna-Barbera Productions between September 19, 1959 and October 20, 1961.

== History ==
Snooper and Blabber form a pair of cat and mouse detectives, respectively, working for the Super Snooper Detective Agency. Daws Butler voiced both characters although the first four episodes originally featured a different actor, Elliot Field, as the voice of Blabber Mouse. Michael Maltese crafted the stories. The characters have appeared in other Hanna-Barbera cartoons, including Scooby's All-Star Laff-A-Lympics and Yogi's Treasure Hunt.

Super Snooper is more or less the one in command whenever the pair takes on a case while Blabber Mouse (a play on "blabbermouth", not to be confused with the Merrie Melodies character Little Blabbermouse) follows whatever orders Snooper gives him. Snooper's voice was patterned after Ed Gardner's Archie on the 1940s radio show Duffy's Tavern. Blabber speaks with a lisp, hence he calls his senior partner "Shnooper". It was one of the rare shows that paired a cat and mouse that were not enemies. Also, Snooper makes frequent contact with his agent Hazel who is never shown, but is revealed to have a Parakeet as a pet.

Some of the pair's cartoons featured early versions of other Hanna-Barbera characters, such as Snagglepuss and Hardy Har Har.

== Episodes ==
=== Series overview ===
Season	Episodes	Originally released	
Season	Episodes	First released	Last released
1	26	September 19, 1959	March 12, 1960
2	13	September 10, 1960	December 3, 1960
3	6	September 15, 1961	October 20, 1961

Every episode was written by Michael Maltese and directed by William Hanna and Joseph Barbera.

=== Season 1 (1959–60) ===
No. overall	No. in season	Title	Animation	Layout	Backgrounds	Original release date
1	1	"Puss n' Booty"	Lew Marshall	Walter Clinton	Bob Gentle	September 19, 1959
In the pilot episode, Snooper and Blabber try to protect the penniless heir Alowishus from his disinherited butler and a man impersonating him.
2	2	"Switch Witch"	Ken Muse	Dick Bickenbach	Fernando Montealegre	September 26, 1959
In court, Snooper and Blabber testify in the trial of a witch accused of persecuting Hansel and Gretel.
3	3	"Real Gone Ghosts"	Lew Marshall	Dick Bickenbach	Bob Gentle	October 3, 1959
The Captain of a ship summons Snooper and Blabber to take care of a couple of poltergeists.
4	4	"Desperate Diamond Dimwits"	Ken Muse	Walt Clinton	Fernando Montealegre	October 10, 1959
Snooper and Blabber attempt to retrieve the King-Size diamond stolen by the thief Lightfingers.
5	5	"Big Diaper Caper"	Lew Marshall	Paul Sommer	Art Lozzi	October 17, 1959
Snooper and Blabber go to the Evil Scientist residence to babysit a sinister baby.
6	6	"The Flea and Me"	Carlo Vinci	Dick Bickenbach	Fernando Montealegre	October 24, 1959
Snooper and Blabber search for a missing stage star flea named Rudolf, who proves to be slippery for the detectives.
7	7	"Disappearing Inc."	Lew Marshall	Walt Clinton	Fernando Montealegre	October 31, 1959
A crook gets hold of an invisibility formula. To catch him, Snooper has Blabber take some of the formula.
8	8	"Baby Rattled"	Ken Muse	Dick Bickenbach	Bob Gentle	November 7, 1959
Snooper and Blabber are assigned to guard a safe in a mansion. But when Babypants infiltrates, a cop stands in the detectives' way.
9	9	"Not So Dummy"	Carlo Vinci	Dick Bickenbach	Fernando Montealegre	November 14, 1959
In Goony Island, Snooper and Blabber investigate a robbery caused by Babypants disguised as a dummy.
10	10	"Fee Fi Fo Fumble"	Lew Marshall	Dick Bickenbach	Bob Gentle	November 21, 1959
With the hope of earning the Pussyfoot award, Snooper explains his case about a vanished bank and a giant.
11	11	"Masquerader Raider"	LaVerne Harding	Walter Clinton	Joe Montell	November 28, 1959
Snooper and Blabber go to the Grumbles Department Store to catch Quick Change Quentin disguising himself as various people.
12	12	"Motor Knows Best"	Lew Marshall	Ed Benedict	Joe Montell	December 5, 1959
Snooper volunteers to beat Crash Smithereens in a car race, while avoiding his cheating tricks.
13	13	"Slippery Glass Slipper"	Lew Marshall	Dick Bickenbach	Bob Gentle	December 12, 1959
Blabber tells a journalist all about his and Snooper's royal case finding the lady who owns a glass slipper.
14	14	"Monkey Wrenched"	Gerard Baldwin	Bob Givens	Joe Montell	December 19, 1959
Snooper and Blabber go to a supermarket to catch an escaped monkey while trying to keep quiet about it.
15	15	"Gopher Goofers"	Don Patterson	Dick Bickenbach	Bob Gentle	December 26, 1959
Snooper and Blabber are assigned to remove a pesky gopher from a rich garden. Their every attempt fails.
16	16	"Impossible Imposters"	Ken Muse	Walt Clinton	Bob Gentle	January 2, 1960
Snooper and Blabber track a mad scientist who has created robot clones of Snooper to give him a criminal name.
17	17	"Adventure Is My Hobby"	Gerard Baldwin	Walt Clinton	Joe Montell	January 9, 1960
Snooper, starring on television, explains a case at Lake Wacha Macha Pool where a sea monster dwelled.
18	18	"Cloudy Rowdy"	Lew Marshall	Ed Benedict	Joe Montell	January 16, 1960
Snooper and Blabber follow the trail of Nimbo Nimbus in his giant skycloud after he steals a precious sapphire.
19	19	"Snap Happy Saps"	Ken Muse	Walt Clinton	Joe Montell	January 23, 1960
Snooper and Blabber go to the Evil Scientist residence to take a photo of Junior.
20	20	"The Lion Is Busy"	Carlo Vinci	Walt Clinton	Art Lozzi	January 30, 1960
Snooper and Blabber search for the escaped mountain lion Snagglepuss, and all three get tangled in the Adventurers' Club.
21	21	"Laughing Guess"	Lew Marshall	Walt Clinton	Art Lozzi	February 6, 1960
Snooper and Blabber try to make Hardy Har Har laugh. Only slipping on a banana peel will make the hyena laugh.
22	22	"The Case of the Purloined Parrot"	Ken Muse	Dick Bickenbach	Bob Gentle	February 13, 1960
Snooper tells how Captain Scuttle's parrot was snatched, since he knew where to find a lost treasure chest.
23	23	"Poodle Toodle-Oo!"	Lew Marshall	Paul Sommer	Bob Gentle	February 20, 1960
Snooper and Blabber, with the help of Toot Sweet the flea, try to track down a runaway poodle. They abort their mission when they see she has a fiance.
24	24	"Doggone Dog, Gone!"	Ken Muse	Walt Clinton	Dick Thomas	February 27, 1960
Snooper and Blabber seek a lost diamond ring. The chase it until Blabber accidentally swallows it.
25	25	"Hula-Hula Hullabaloo"	Ken Muse	Paul Sommer	Dick Thomas	March 5, 1960
Snooper is to deliver a ping pong pearl to San Francisco, but it gets eaten by a flying fish.
26	26	"Wild Man, Wild!"	Ken Muse	Ed Benedict	Bob Gentle	March 12, 1960
Snooper and Blabber tail a wild man on the loose. By the time they find him, he's become civilized and adopted.

=== Season 2 (1960) ===
No. overall	No. in season	Title	Animation	Layout	Backgrounds	Original release date
27	1	"Ala-Kazoop!"	TBA	TBA	Fernando Montealegre	September 10, 1960
Snooper and an inspector are on the case of a stolen ruby. Blabber possessed by Hypno's powers is after that ruby.
28	2	"Hop to It"	George Nicholas	Dick Bickenbach	Bob Gentle	September 17, 1960
Snooper and Blabber chase after a diamond thief hitching a ride in a kangaroo's pouch, who repeatedly stomps on Snooper.
29	3	"Fleas Be Careful"	Lew Marshall	Paul Sommer	Bob Gentle	September 24, 1960
Blabber tells all about Snooper's case regarding Toot Sweet trying win the heart of his girlfriend, who was taken by a slick flea.
30	4	"Observant Servants"	Ed Love	Paul Sommer	Bob Gentle	October 1, 1960
Snooper and Blabber go undercover to guard a precious tiara, which gets taken by Lightfingers, hiding in a birthday cake.
31	5	"De-Duck-Tives"	Carlo Vinci	Paul Sommer	Dick Thomas	October 8, 1960
Snooper and Blabber are sent to hunt a Tralfazian duck, but a duckling pesters them thinking their duck decoy is his mother.
32	6	"Big Shot Blab"	Lew Marshall	Paul Sommer	Dick Thomas	October 15, 1960
Blabber eats a peanut which is a high atomic explosive entrusted to Snooper by a scientist. Then he gives Snooper a hard time.
33	7	"Big Cat Caper"	Hicks Lokey	Paul Sommer	Bob Gentle	October 22, 1960
Before Snooper can send Snagglepuss to the zoo, he escapes. Snooper and Blabber chase the mountain lion through the city park.
34	8	"Scoop Snoop"	Lew Marshall	Paul Sommer	Dick Thomas	October 29, 1960
Snooper and Blabber travel to the Himalayas to photograph an Abominable Snowman. Blabber gets successful photo shots.
35	9	"Prince of a Fella"	Lew Marshall	Paul Sommer	Vera Hanson	November 5, 1960
The Wickedonia Queen sends Snooper and Blabber to find Snow White. Instead, they have her meet Prince Charming and turn into frogs.
36	10	"Flea for All"	LaVerne Harding	Don Sheppard	Art Lozzi	November 12, 1960
Snooper and Blabber follow a diamond theft to Scratchit's flea circus. Snooper then gets Toot Sweet to infiltrate the flea circus.
37	11	"Outer Space Case"	Brad Case	Don Sheppard	Dick Thomas	November 19, 1960
Snooper and Blabber are taken to Mars to catch a thieving astronaut monkey. The case ends with Blabber staying behind.
38	12	"Bear-ly Able"	Brad Case	Paul Sommer	Dick Thomas	November 26, 1960
The Bear Family request Snooper and Blabber to find the thief who stole their porridge, who is none other than the Big Bad Wolf.
39	13	"Surprised Party"	Lew Marshall	Paul Sommer	Art Lozzi	December 3, 1960
Snooper and Blabber go to the Evil Scientist residence to hold a party for their baby, who puts them into a lot of danger.

=== Season 3 (1961) ===
No. overall	No. in season	Title	Animation	Layout	Backgrounds	Original release date
40	1	"Zoom-Zoom Blabber"	LaVerne Harding	Don Sheppard	Dick Thomas	September 15, 1961
The Captain Zoom-Zoom actor asks Snooper to catch Fly Burglar. Blabber assumes Zoom-Zoom's identity to protect a precious sapphire.
41	2	"Eenie, Genie, Minie, Mo!"	C.L. Hartman	TBA	TBA	September 22, 1961
Blabber goes with Snooper to recover Aladdin's genie. A long chase eventually gets the genie caught.
42	3	"Bronco Bluster"	John Boersma	Jack Huber	Anthony Rizzo	September 29, 1961
Snooper and Blabber try to find a wild runaway horse. Snooper sends him home to Texas instead of Madison Round Garden.
43	4	"Chilly Chiller"	John Boersma	Jerry Eisenberg	Bob Gentle	October 6, 1961
A ghost requests Snooper and Blabber to remove the Evil Scientist family from his house, but their attempts fail.
44	5	"Gem Jams"	John Boersma	Walt Clinton	Fernando Montealegre	October 13, 1961
Snooper and Blabber try to find Mr. Richley's stolen gems. The butler is the prime suspect, who used shrinking potion to swipe them.
45	6	"Person to Prison"	Hicks Lokey	Jerry Eisenberg	Art Lozzi	October 20, 1961
In the series finale, Snooper and Blabber go to Sing Song prison disguised as convicts to prevent a jail break. Their attempt only gets them convicted.

== Other appearances ==
=== Hanna-Barbera ===
Snooper and Blabber appeared in the 1972 TV-movie Yogi's Ark Lark, which was part of The ABC Saturday Superstar Movie and also the pilot for Yogi’s Gang. They also appear in the 1982 special Yogi Bear's All Star Comedy Christmas Caper.

The duo later appeared in the following Hanna-Barbera cartoon series:

- The Yogi Bear Show, to see Yogi at his birthday party.
- Laff-A-Lympics, as members of Yogi’s team.
- Yogi's Treasure Hunt, as regular characters.
- Yo Yogi!, with Snooper voiced by Rob Paulsen and Blabber voiced by Hal Smith. Snooper was a celebrity detective while Blabber ran the "Crooks 'n' Books Store" at Jellystone Mall.
- The Super Secret Secret Squirrel segment (episode "Agent Penny") of 2 Stupid Dogs. Rob Paulsen reprises Snooper here and also voices Blabber.
- Snooper made a brief cameo appearance (without Blabber) in the 1988 TV-movie The Good, the Bad, and Huckleberry Hound.
- Snooper and Blabber appeared in DC Comics' Deathstroke/Yogi Bear Special #1 as captured animals alongside other Hanna-Barbera characters.
- Snooper and Blabber appear in a Wacky Races episode "The Wacky Always Races Twice" played as two of Professor Bella's thugs.
- Snooper and Blabber both appear in the series Jellystone! In the series, Snooper (voiced by Georgie Kidder) is female and Blabber (voiced by Bernardo de Paula) has facial hair. Blabber lacks a lisp in this series.
- Snooper and Blabber are shown on a list in the Velma episode "Velma Makes a List".

=== Other media ===
Snooper and Blabber made appearances in a number of comic books, and had their own title from Gold Key Comics, which only ran for three issues (1962–1963).

In the mid-1960s, Snooper and Blabber were the stars of two LP albums from Hanna-Barbera Records:

- James Bomb, in which the duo were involved in a James Bond-type adventure; the record included songs with titles like "Dr. Oh No" and "Gold Pinky".
- Monster Shindig, in which Snooper and Blabber are called to investigate a loud party, which is being thrown by The Gruesomes. Paul Frees voiced Snooper and June Foray voiced Blabber on this record.

In the Robot Chicken season 3 episode "Ban on the Fun", Snooper and Blabber appear in the "Laff-A-Munich" skit, confronting the Great Fondoo who was holding the groceries after the Really Rottens have murdered the majority of the Yogi Yahooeys. Snooper asks Fondoo, "Do you know why we're here?" However, the Great Fondoo questions why HE is there, stating he is a nobody and that Hanna-Barbera should've had plenty of other villains to make up the Really Rottens. Snooper and Blabber then shoot him to death.

== See also ==
- Quick Draw McGraw
- List of works produced by Hanna-Barbera
- List of Hanna-Barbera characters
