= Yogi's Great Escape =

1987 film

- Written by: Neal Barbera
- Story by: Steven Banks (artist)
- Directed by: Bob Goe; Paul Sommer; Rudy Zamora
- Voices of: Daws Butler; Don Messick; Frank Welker; Allan Melvin; Scott Menville; Susan Blu; Hamilton Camp; Eden Gross; Josh Rodine; Dustin Diamond; Pat Fraley; Tress MacNeille
- Music by: Sven Libaek
- Country of origin: United States
- Original language: English

Production
- Executive producers: William Hanna; Joseph Barbera
- Producer: Kay Wright
- Running time: 93 minutes
- Production company: Hanna-Barbera Productions

Original release
- Network: Syndication
- Release: September 20, 1987

Yogi's Great Escape is a 1987 animated made-for-television film produced by Hanna-Barbera as part of the Hanna-Barbera Superstars 10 series. The film aired in syndication.

== Plot ==
One spring, Yogi and Boo-Boo Bear awake from hibernation to discover three orphaned bear cubs named Bopper, Buzzy, and Bitsy left at the front door of their cave. Despite their initial reservations, Yogi and Boo Boo take the bear cubs into their home and take care of them.

Meanwhile, Jellystone Park has gone over budget and the park commissioner orders Ranger Smith to close it down. This means that Yogi, along with the other bears at the park, must be sent to a zoo. Because Yogi can't stand the thought of being cooped up in a zoo for the rest of his life, he hatches an elaborate escape plan. Salvaging car parts from a failed fishing expedition, he constructs a getaway "Supercar," complete with a picnic basket rumble seat for the three orphaned cubs. Together they make their escape from the park to find a new home.

After Ranger Smith initially fails to capture Yogi, he hires a professional trapper named Trapper and his hound Yapper. However, it turns out that Trapper and Yapper are more of a hindrance to Ranger Smith's efforts rather than a help. Yogi and his friends go through several adventures along their journey. Their first stop is at a watermelon patch. After eating their fill of watermelons, the bears retire to a seemingly abandoned tree house. It turns out to be the secret clubhouse of the Bike Brigade, three boys who ride bicycles and operate a shortwave radio. When the boys return, they believe the bears are alien invaders and attack them with their squirt guns. After Yogi surrenders, they recognize him and decide to help him in his escape. Using their radio, the boys call ahead to their cohorts in other clubs around the country to watch for Yogi and help him in his getaway.

Next they find themselves in a western ghost town. Apparently the only remaining resident is the sheriff, Quick Draw McGraw, who mistakes Yogi and Boo Boo for bank robbers Bandit Bear and Li'l Brother Bear and throws them in jail (since Quick Draw didn't know it was Yogi and Boo Boo after only identifying them by their appearances instead of their voices) along with the three cubs. The Lone Raiders, another club in league with the Bike Brigade, help spring Yogi from jail and capture the real robbers, who turn out to be close look-alikes to Yogi and Boo Boo.

Yogi and his friends then find themselves on the bayou. Wally Gator, another zoo fugitive, inhabits a spooky steamboat, complete with ghostly illusions intended to scare away zookeepers. He takes in Yogi and his friends and serves them a fabulous dinner. When Ranger Smith, Trapper, and Yapper show up, Wally and the bears attempt to scare them away. However, the sudden appearance of a real ghost makes everyone run for their lives. While the anonymous ghost pursues the hunters, Yogi and his friends are rescued by another club, the Swamp Foxes.

The Supercar next stops at a carnival where the bears meet Yogi's old friend Snagglepuss. Snagglepuss hides the bears from Ranger Smith by disguising them in his Little Egypt stage show. When Ranger Smith sees through the disguises, the bears escape in a hot air balloon.

As the balloon floats across the country, Ranger Smith and his cohorts follow in hot pursuit. After the Trapper and Yapper attempt to grapple the balloon from the top of Mount Rushmore, they fall and are not seen again. The balloon finally snags on the antenna of the Empire State Building in a dense fog. Ranger Smith approaches the balloon in a helicopter and hands Yogi a telephone; the President of the United States tells Yogi that he is not going to let Jellystone Park close after all, and that Yogi and his friends may return to their home.

== Cast ==
- Daws Butler as Yogi Bear, Quick Draw McGraw, Wally Gator, Snagglepuss
- Susan Blu as Buzzy, Little Cowgirl, Swamp Fox Girl, Girl, Swamp Fox Kid #2
- William Callaway as Dad, Trapper
- Hamilton Camp as Li'l Brother Bear
- Dustin Diamond as Chubby Kid
- Patrick Fraley as Cowboy Kid #1, Reporter, Swamp Fox Kid
- Edan Gross as Bitsy
- Allan Melvin as Bandit Bear
- Tress MacNeille as Boy, Cowboy Kid #2, Mom, Swamp Fox Boy
- Scott Menville as Leader Kid
- Don Messick as Boo-Boo Bear, Ranger Smith
- Josh Rodine as Skinny Kid
- Frank Welker as Bopper, Real Ghost, Yapper

== Computer game ==
A platform video game based on the movie was released in 1990. It consists of six levels where Yogi has to dodge dogs, hunters, and Ranger Smith. It was published by Hi-Tec Software.

== Home media ==
Yogi's Great Escape was released on VHS by Worldvision Home Video on November 19, 1987.

On December 7, 2010, Warner Bros. released Yogi's Great Escape on DVD in NTSC picture format with all region encoding, via their Warner Archive Collection. This is a Manufacture-on-Demand (MOD) release, available exclusively through Warner's online store and Amazon.com.

The film was released on Blu-ray as part of a Hanna-Barbera Superstars 10 boxset through Warner Archive on February 20, 2024. The film was remastered in HD.
