= Yogi Bear's All Star Comedy Christmas Caper =

1982 American animated Christmas television special

- Genre: Adventure; Comedy drama Fantasy
- Written by: Mark Evanier
- Directed by: Steve Lumley
- Starring: Daws Butler; Don Messick; Mel Blanc; Henry Corden; Georgi Irene; Allan Melvin; Hal Smith; John Stephenson; Janet Waldo; Jimmy Weldon
- Music by: Hoyt Curtin (musical director); Paul DeKorte (music supervisor)
- Country of origin: United States
- Original language: English

Production
- Executive producers: William Hanna; Joseph Barbera
- Editor: Robert Ciaglia
- Running time: 24 minutes
- Production company: Hanna-Barbera Productions

Original release
- Network: CBS
- Release: December 21, 1982

Yogi Bear's All Star Comedy Christmas Caper is a 1982 American animated Christmas television special starring Yogi Bear. It is the third and final Yogi Christmas special. Produced by Hanna-Barbera Productions, it first aired on December 21, 1982 on CBS. Along with Yogi's traditional cast, the characters also met up with many other Hanna-Barbera characters, including Magilla Gorilla and Fred Flintstone.

== Plot ==
Huckleberry Hound brings his friends Hokey Wolf, Snagglepuss, Quick Draw McGraw, Augie Doggie and Doggie Daddy, and Snooper and Blabber with him to visit Jellystone Park for Christmas and they discover Yogi Bear and Boo-Boo have escaped from Jellystone and hidden out in a department store. Yogi is disguised as Santa Claus while Boo-Boo poses as his elf. Meanwhile Billionaire tycoon J. Wellington Jones arrives with his daughter Judy who's not fond of her father's workaholic behavior. Judy asks him to go shopping with her, but Mr. Jones says he's too busy and wants Judy to be on her own.

In the store, Judy bumps into Yogi and Boo-Boo (who she thinks is Santa) and tells them that she wants to be with her father for Christmas, but Mr. Jones, now furious over Judy taking forever in the store, causing her father to miss a meeting he was supposed to attend, shows up and asks security to find her so that Mr. Jones can confront Judy. One of the guards that show up then tries to accuse Yogi for not only being with Judy, but for impersonating one of their Santa's.

Yogi, Boo-Boo, and Judy escape the store and hide in a park having a picnic, but Huckleberry Hound and the rest show up. Judy tells them that she refuses to go home, so Yogi tells everyone to locate Judy's address, but they're too many people named Jones in the area. Auggie Doggie and Doggie Daddy agree to watch over Judy while they are away.

- In his search, Snagglepuss encounters Fred Flintstone and Barney Rubble as Street Santa Claus who are collecting money for a Bedrock charity. They tell him to ask a passing lady his question for donations. When the old lady screams in fear of Snagglepuss, Fred and Barney attack him, claiming it to be an entertainment purpose. Snooper and Blabber go to the police.
- Quick Draw has no luck as Mr. Jinks states that nobody named Mr. Jones lives in his building. Pixie and Dixie leave a present for Mr. Jinks which contains a bulldog.
- Magilla Gorilla, Wally Gator, and Yakky Doodle haven't seen Mr. Jones either. As Yogi hasn't had any luck locating her dad's office, they remain in the park to try to figure out a plan there.

Mr. Jones is at his mansion where his butler tells him that Ranger Smith (who was searching for Yogi) showed up. The Ranger tells Mr. Jones about Yogi's behavior, and he didn't mean to take Judy. Mr. Jones tells the Ranger that he wants to confront Yogi and have not only Yogi thrown in jail, but Ranger Smith too. Auggie Doggie and Doggie Daddy try to comfort Judy, but she is crying because the two dogs spend more time together and Judy wants to be with her father, especially around Christmas. Snooper and Blabber were speaking to Police Chief Blake at the time when word comes that Judy was seen in the park by a patrol car, and the Chief heads out to personally see the arrest of Judy's kidnapper. At the park, Yogi and his friends celebrate Christmas when the police arrive with Mr. Jones and Ranger Smith. When the police are about to arrest Yogi, Mr. Jones immediately gets in Yogi's face accusing him of kidnapping Judy. Yogi denies it by telling Mr. Jones that Judy wanted to get away from him for not being a good father to her and then Yogi tells Mr. Jones that he needs to spend more time with Judy before she becomes an adult. Mr. Jones then furiously says he's unable to because he keeps going away for meetings and conferences and isn't at home a lot, but then has an epiphany as he realizes what he just said and that Yogi is right: Everything that happened today was all his fault because of his workaholic behavior and he's been a terrible father to Judy. Mr. Jones decides to drop the charges by telling Chief Blake to release Yogi because Mr. Jones was actually the one responsible for the whole mess and Yogi is innocent. Judy and Mr. Jones reunite in the park with Mr. Jones telling her that he's sorry for his actions. Meanwhile Ranger Smith takes care of sorting out anything else the police would charge Yogi with.

Meanwhile the Christmas celebration continues in the park with everyone singing. Mr. Jones now having apparently resolved to be a better father, asks the gang if they want to spend Christmas at his mansion, but Judy tells him that the park is better and Mr. Jones agrees. The special ends with everyone saying Merry Christmas to the audience.

=== Cast ===
- Daws Butler as Yogi Bear, Huckleberry Hound, Snagglepuss, Quick Draw McGraw, Mr. Jinks, and Hokey Wolf

=== Additional Voices ===
- Mel Blanc as Barney Rubble, The Bulldog, and Security Guard #1
- Henry Corden as Fred Flintstone, The Policeman, and Security Guard #2
- Georgi Irene as Judy Jones
- Allan Melvin as Magilla Gorilla, and Murray
- Don Messick as Boo-Boo Bear, Ranger Smith, Pixie
- John Stephenson as Doggie Daddy, The Butler, and The Announcer
- Hal Smith as J. Wellington Jones, The Police Sergeant, and Zookeeper #1
- Janet Waldo as Mrs. Jones, Murray's Wife, The Lady in the Street, and The P.A. Voice at The Bus Depot
- Jimmy Weldon as Yakky Doodle, and Zookeeper #2

== Home media ==
On September 26, 1995, Yogi Bear's All Star Comedy Christmas Caper was released by Turner Home Entertainment on VHS, later a DVD of it came out on December 7, 2010, by Warner Home Video.

== See also ==
- List of works produced by Hanna-Barbera
  - The Yogi Bear Show
  - Casper's First Christmas
  - Yogi's First Christmas
  - Yogi's Treasure Hunt
  - The New Yogi Bear Show
  - Fender Bender 500
  - Yo Yogi!
- List of Hanna-Barbera characters
- List of Yogi Bear characters
