= Lippy the Lion and Hardy Har Har =

American animated television series

- Running on a ship's deck, Lippy (right) leads Hardy Har Har (left) in "Sea-Saw".
- Genre: Comedy
- Directed by: William Hanna; Joseph Barbera
- Voices of: Daws Butler; Mel Blanc
- Theme music composer: Hoyt Curtin
- Opening theme: Theme from Lippy the Lion and Hardy Har Har
- Ending theme: Theme from Lippy the Lion and Hardy Har Har
- Composer: Hoyt Curtin
- Country of origin: United States
- Original language: English
- No. of episodes: 52

Production
- Producers: William Hanna; Joseph Barbera
- Production company: Hanna-Barbera Productions

Original release
- Network: First-run syndication
- Release: September 3, 1962 – August 26, 1963

Lippy the Lion and Hardy Har Har is an American animated television series produced by Hanna-Barbera Productions, and aired as one of the three segments of the syndicated show The Hanna-Barbera New Cartoon Series, the other two being Wally Gator and Touché Turtle and Dum Dum. The segment stars the titular anthropomorphic lion and hyena duo in a series of goofy misadventures.

== History ==
Lippy the Lion (voiced by Daws Butler impersonating Joe E. Brown) and Hardy Har Har the hyena (voiced by Mel Blanc) first appeared in The Hanna-Barbera New Cartoon Series on September 3, 1962, along with Wally Gator and Touché Turtle and Dum Dum. Mel Blanc used the same voice, personality and expressions for Hardy Har Har that he used playing the postman on the Burns and Allen radio show.

Their cartoons revolve around ever-hopeful Lippy's attempts to conduct a get-rich-quick scheme, with the reluctant Hardy serving as a foil. Whatever the consequences were to Lippy's schemes, Hardy ends up getting the worst of it — a fact he always seems to realize ahead of time, with his moans of "Oh me, oh my, oh dear". Although the intro shows them in a jungle setting proper for such beasts, most of the cartoons' stories are set in urban areas.

Since then, the duo have been infrequently included in the cast of Hanna-Barbera's ensemble shows (e.g., Yogi's Gang). They are no longer constantly pursuing Lippy's get-rich-quick schemes, but their personalities were unchanged: Lippy is still the smiling optimist, Hardy the moaning pessimist.

== Voice cast ==
- Daws Butler – Lippy the Lion
- Mel Blanc – Hardy Har Har
- Additional voices – Julie Bennett, Don Messick, Jean Vander Pyl, Doug Young

NOTE: Before the series regained its popularity among Hanna-Barbera fans, websites describing the series claimed that Blanc left the series after 18 episodes, with Butler taking over the role of Hardy as well as Lippy for the remaining 34 episodes. This is untrue, however – Blanc voiced Hardy in all 52 episodes. This confusion likely came about because a prototype Hardy Har Har first appeared in a Snooper and Blabber cartoon several years before, in which he was voiced by Butler.

== Home media ==
The show's first episode, "Sea-saw", is available on Saturday Morning Cartoons 1960's Vol. 2.

On July 9, 2019, Warner Archive released the series on DVD. It was released on Blu-ray on December 16, 2025.

== Other appearances ==
- Lippy the Lion and Hardy Har Har were seen in Yogi's Ark Lark. In one scene, Lippy was fed up with Hardy's behavior when those that were on Noah's Ark were getting bored looking for the perfect place. Though he did save Hardy when the Ark ended up in a storm. Both of them were also in the TV movie's sequel series, Yogi's Gang. In both appearances, Hardy Har Har was voiced by John Stephenson while Butler reprised Lippy.
- Lippy and Hardy appeared in one issue of a 1963 comic book by Gold Key Comics, and also featured in three issues of Gold Key's 1962-1963 Hanna-Barbera Bandwagon.
- Lippy and Hardy appeared in the 1977 Hanna-Barbera comic book issue called "The Flintstones' Christmas Party".
- Lippy and Hardy had appeared in an episode of Yogi's Treasure Hunt.
- Lippy and Hardy were seen in Yo Yogi!, voiced by Greg Burson and Rob Paulsen respectively. Hardy Har Har is a teenager in the episode, "Tricky Dickie's Dirty Trickies", in which Yogi and Hardy become a duo when Dick Dastardly gets Yogi fired from the L.A.F. Squad. In "Polly Want a Safe Cracker", Lippy the Lion appears as the proprietor of "The Precious Gems and Jams Store" that gets robbed by the Birdbrain of Alcatrax.
- Lippy and Hardy appeared in DC Comics Deathstroke/Yogi Bear Special #1 as captured animals alongside other Hanna-Barbera characters.
- Lippy and Hardy appeared in the series Jellystone! with Lippy the Lion voiced by Jeff Bergman with a Yiddish accent and Hardy Har Har voiced by Jenny Lorenzo with a Latin American accent. The characters are elderly, Hardy is female and wears glasses, and they are married. The episode "Face of the Town" reveals that Lippy is Jellystone's oldest citizen and that he knew Jellystone's founder Hubert Bartholomewbert, whom Lippy accused of lying for fame and money. The episode "Baby Shenangigans" reveals that Lippy and Hardy were still in their prime when they were 72.
