= Yogi's Gang =

1973 American animated television series

- Genre: Adventure; Comedy; Edutainment
- Directed by: Charles A. Nichols
- Voices of: Daws Butler; Henry Corden; Allan Melvin; Don Messick; John Stephenson; Jean Vander Pyl
- Composer: Hoyt Curtin
- Country of origin: United States
- Original language: English
- No. of episodes: 15 (+ one television film)

Production
- Executive producers: William Hanna; Joseph Barbera
- Running time: 30 minutes
- Production company: Hanna-Barbera Productions

Original release
- Network: ABC
- Release: September 8 – December 29, 1973

Related
- Fred Flintstone and Friends

Yogi's Gang is an American Saturday-morning cartoon, and the second incarnation of the Yogi Bear franchise, produced by Hanna-Barbera Productions, which aired for 16 half-hour episodes on ABC from September 8, 1973, to December 29, 1973. The show began as Yogi's Ark Lark, a special TV movie on The ABC Saturday Superstar Movie in 1972. Fifteen original episodes were produced for broadcast on ABC, with the hour-long Yogi's Ark Lark thrown in as a split-in-half two-parter. The show confronted social and cultural issues like ecology and bigotry, with villains named Mr. Waste, Dr. Bigot, the Envy Brothers, Lotta Litter, the Greedy Genie and Mr. Cheater.

After a successful run on Saturday mornings, episodes of Yogi's Gang were serialized on the syndicated weekday series, Fred Flintstone and Friends in 1977–78. In the late 1980s, repeats were shown on USA Cartoon Express and later resurfaced on Nickelodeon, Cartoon Network and Boomerang. As of June 2024, the series is included as part of MeTV Toons' lineup.

Yogi's Gang is the only Yogi Bear show to have a laugh track.

== Plot ==
Yogi, Quick Draw, Huck and the rest of the gang encounter a variety of villains such as Captain Swashbuckle Swipe, Smokestack Smog, Lotta Litter, the Envy Brothers, Mr. Hothead, Dr. Bigot, the Gossipy Witch of the West, J. Wantum Vandal, the Sheik of Selfishness, Commodore Phineas P. Fibber, I.M. Sloppy, Peter D. Cheater, Mr. Waste, Hilarious P. Prankster, and the Greedy Genie, who act as their friends, hosts and/or guests, but embody some of the most common human faults and vices. Yogi and crew would often put up with them which ends with the villains either being repelled or outdone by their actions.

== Characters ==
- Atom Ant
- Augie Doggie and Doggie Daddy
- The Hillbilly Bears
- Hokey Wolf and Ding-A-Ling Wolf
- Huckleberry Hound
- Lippy the Lion and Hardy Har Har
- Magilla Gorilla
- Peter Potamus and So-So
- Pixie and Dixie and Mr. Jinks
- Punkin' Puss & Mushmouse
- Quick Draw McGraw & Baba Looey
- Ricochet Rabbit & Droop-a-Long
- Secret Squirrel and Morocco Mole
- Snagglepuss
- Snooper and Blabber
- Squiddly Diddly
- Touché Turtle and Dum Dum
- Wally Gator
- Yakky Doodle
- Yogi Bear and Boo-Boo Bear

== Voice cast ==
- Daws Butler – Yogi Bear, Augie Doggie, Huckleberry Hound, Quick Draw McGraw, Snagglepuss, Wally Gator, Peter Potamus, Baba Looey, Lippy the Lion, Hokey Wolf, Tantrum (in "Mr. Hothead")
- Henry Corden – Paw Rugg, Dr. Bigot (in "Dr. Bigot"), Chief Ranger Short (in "The Gossipy Witch", "Lotta Litter"), Mr. Waste (in "Mr. Waste"), Tex Jackson (in "Mr. Hothead")
- Allan Melvin – Magilla Gorilla, Haggling (in "Dr. Bigot"), Vic Vagabond (in "The Greedy Genie"), I.M. Sloppy/Mr. Neat (in "Mr. Sloppy")
- Don Messick – Boo-Boo Bear, Squiddly Diddly, Touché Turtle, Atom Ant, Ranger Smith, Billy Bindlestiff (in "The Greedy Genie"), Messy (in "Mr. Sloppy") Mayans (in "The Sheik of Selfishness"), Mayor of Smog City (in "Mr. Smog"), Narrator (in "Captain Swipe"), Police Officer (in "Captain Swipe"), Temper (in "Mr. Hothead")
- John Stephenson – Doggie Daddy, Hardy Har Har, Mr. Cheerful (in "Dr. Bigot"), Bickering (in "Dr. Bigot"), Greedy Genie (in "The Greedy Genie"), Butler (in "The Greedy Genie"), Hilarious P. Prankster (in "Mr. Prankster"), Ark-o-Beak Bird (in "Mr. Prankster"), Postal Pelican (in "Mr. Cheater"), Mr. Waste's Parrot (in "Mr. Waste"), Professor Woodstock (in "Lotta Litter"), P.T. Barnswallow (in "The Envy Brothers"), The Great Zucchini (in "The Envy Brothers"), Envy Brother #2 (in "The Envy Brothers", Captain Swashbuckle Swipe (in "Captain Swipe"), Fumbo Jumbo the Masked Avenger (in "Captain Swipe"), Mr. Hothead (in "Mr. Hothead")
- Jean Vander Pyl – Maw Rugg

=== Additional voices ===
- Josh Albee - Freddy (in "Mr. Vandal"), Jimmy
- Julie Bennett – Cindy Bear
- Tom Bosley – Commadore Phineas P. Fibber (in "Mr. Fibber")
- Walker Edmiston –
- Virginia Gregg – Gossipy Witch of the West (in "The Gossipy Witch")
- Jim MacGeorge –
- Rose Marie – Lotta Litter (in "Lotta Litter")
- Hal Smith – Smiley the Hobo (in "The Greedy Genie"), J. Wanton Vandal (in "Mr. Vandal")
- Lennie Weinrib – Smokestack Smog (in "Mr. Smog")
- Jesse White – Peter D. Cheater (in "Mr. Cheater")
- Paul Winchell – Sheik of Selfishness (in "The Sheik of Selfishness")

== Episodes ==
No.	Title	Original release date	Prod. code
1	"Dr. Bigot"	September 8, 1973	70-1
Yogi and the gang land on the property of Yogi's old friend Mr. Cheerful when Magilla runs out of bananas. A villain named Dr. Bigot and his henchmen Haggling and Bickering plan to experiment on them with his Bigot ray and turn Mr. Cheerful and Yogi into bigots, discriminating against everyone else.
2	"The Greedy Genie"	September 15, 1973	70-2
A friendly hobo named Smiley (who happens to be Yogi's old friend) finds a lamp with a Greedy Genie who grants all his wishes. However, the genie convinces the man to lust for more and is soon overcome with greed. The Genie later switches his target to Snagglepuss.
3	"Mr. Prankster"	September 22, 1973	70-3
Yogi and the gang visit Ranger Smith and put a show for a bus full of orphan children visiting Jellystone Park. Unfortunately, Wally Gator doesn't have any talents and has to be a curtain puller. A jester-themed entertainer named Hilarious P. Prankster tricks Wally by offering to make him a comedian as revenge for being refused by Yogi to be in the show. As a result, Wally starts playing mean pranks on everybody and starts losing his friends....until they learn Hilarious is behind Wally's new hobby and made a fool out of him.
4	"Mr. Fibber"	September 29, 1973	70-4
The long-nosed Commadore Phineas P. Fibber is picked up by the Ark. He teaches various animals to lie and soon they start using their fibs on Captain Yogi to get into their way. Lies soon turn against them when a tornado is coming and Yogi won't believe them.
5	"The Gossipy Witch"	October 6, 1973	70-5
Yogi gets homesick and the animals go back to Jellystone Park where there is a big party planned for him. However, the Gossipy Witch of the West (who works for Ranger Smith with various professions) finds and spreads rumors all over the park including one that Yogi is engaged to Cindy and planning to leave the gang forever. At the same time, Chief Ranger Short (after seeing the ark and animals) is sure that a big flood is coming and investigates by dressing up as a giant chicken.
6	"Mr. Sloppy"	October 13, 1973	70-6
A messy man named I.M. Sloppy and his pet dog Messy can't stand to see Yogi's crew cleaning up their ship. I.M. Sloppy uses his book of sloppy spells to turn himself into a nice gentleman named Mr. Neat and tricks the animals into cutting corners in their jobs.
7	"Mr. Cheater"	October 20, 1973	70-7
Peter D. Cheater invites Snagglepuss, Quick Draw McGraw, and Wally Gator to join his school where he teaches them the "art of cheating." Things get worse when he tricks Yogi into giving him the Ark.
8	"Mr. Waste"	October 27, 1973	70-8
After a storm, Yogi and his gang stop on an island and need to get more supplies. They meet Mr. Waste (under his alias of "Mr. Plenty") who encourages the animals to stay on his island and use everything as much as possible. The animals are happy thinking they found a paradise, but Atom Ant (who as an ant doesn't believe in wasting things) soon finds out what Mr. Plenty is really up to.
9	"Mr. Vandal"	November 3, 1973	70-9
The gang is stopping at an old town called McGrawsville when Quick Draw McGraw inherits it from his grandpappy. When J. Wanton Vandal and his campers stop in the town and start demolishing antiques, it's up to Yogi and the gang to teach the kids the value of antique objects and thwart J. Wanton Vandal.
10	"The Sheik of Selfishness"	November 10, 1973	70-10
On the way to a birthday party for his friend the Sheik of Sharing who once visited Jellystone Park, Yogi meets his brother the Sheik of Selfishness and his henchmen the Mayans. He gives Yogi a magic box which can give Yogi anything he desires, but soon it makes Yogi act selfish.
11	"Mr. Smog"	November 17, 1973	70-11
The gang stops at "Smog City," a city covered in smog by Mr. Smokestack Smog's smog factory where he has convinced everybody that smog is good for them. He encounters Magilla Gorilla, Peter Potamus, and Snagglepuss (who are looking for bananas for the ark) and tries to convince them into his way of thinking.
12	"Lotta Litter"	November 24, 1973	70-12
Jellystone Park is going to be declared the "Neatest Park in the West" by Professor Woodstock and the animals help Ranger Smith and Chief Ranger Short clean it up. A villainess named Lotta Litter tricks them into littering where she uses her power to impersonate anybody.
13	"The Envy Brothers"	December 1, 1973	70-13
Two trapeze artists named the Envy Brothers use their "envy rings" on all the other circus acts to make them quit since they are jealous of the owner of the circus named P.T. Barnswallow and want to trick him into signing the circus to them. However, their plan may fail when Yogi and his friends join the circus.
14	"Captain Swipe"	December 8, 1973	70-14
Wally Gator is sad because he is the only one of the animals who doesn't own a surfboard or any other beach gear. However, a pirate named Captain Swashbuckle Swipe decides to teach him the "easy way" (stealing). Yogi enlists the help of Fumbo-Jumbo the Masked Avenger: a goofy Zorro-like elephant to help recover their stuff.
15	"Mr. Hothead"	December 15, 1973	70-15
Cindy Bear gets ownership of a dude ranch, and all the animals come to help her get it ready for the guests. But a bad guy named Mr. Hothead (who goes under the name Mr. Coolhead) uses his invention to make all the animals except for Yogi, Cindy, and Boo Boo lose their tempers. Since they can't work together, the boys won't finish their jobs in time and Mr. Hothead will trick Cindy into selling him her ranch. Will they learn to work things out in a calm way without losing their tempers and defeat Mr. Hothead and his henchmen Temper and Tantrum?
16	"Yogi's Ark Lark, Part 1"	December 22, 1973	70-16
Part 1 of the series finale. This episode is actually the first half of the TV-movie Yogi's Ark Lark.
17	"Yogi's Ark Lark, Part 2"	December 29, 1973	70-17
Part 2 of the series finale. This episode is actually the second half of the TV-movie Yogi's Ark Lark.

== Home media ==
The episode "The Greedy Genie" was included on the DVD compilation Saturday Morning Cartoons: 1970s Volume 1 released from Warner Home Video on May 26, 2009. The "Mr. Bigot" episode is available on the DVD Saturday Morning Cartoons: 1970s Vol. 2. On February 19, 2013, Warner Archive released Yogi's Gang: The Complete Series on DVD in NTSC picture format with all region encoding, as part of their Hanna-Barbera Classic Collection. This is a Manufacture-on-Demand (MOD) release, available exclusively through Warner's online store, Walmart.com and Amazon.com. Yogi's Gang: The Complete Series is also available for download via iTunes Store and Google Play Store, as well as Amazon Prime Video and on FAST service Tubi (which added alongside Dexter's Laboratory, Taz-Mania, Teen Titans [2003] and Justice League on March 1, 2026).

== Other appearances ==
The different villains in this show have made appearances in Jellystone! In "Jailcation", Hilarious P. Prankster appears as an inmate of Santo Relaxo. In "Balloon Kids", Captain Swashbuckle Swipe (voiced by Bernardo de Paula), Lotta Litter (voiced by Georgie Kidder), Mr. Smog (voiced by C.H. Greenblatt), and the Gossipy Witch of the West (voiced by Dana Snyder) appear as a group of sky pirates. Mr. Hothead appears in "Heroes and Capes" being chased by Mayor Huckleberry Hound in his Armored Mayor alias. In "Chair Me Mateys", the sky pirates help Yogi Bear and Boo Boo reclaim Yogi's chair. It is also revealed that Captain Swipe is friends with Moby Dick where he once bailed Moby Dick out of jail for accidentally swallowing a child.
