= Red Coffey =

American voice actor, comedian (1923–88)

- Born: Merle Herman Coffman; April 24, 1923; Arkansas City, Kansas
- Died: August 1, 1988 (aged 65); U.S. Virgin Islands
- Other name: Red Coffee
- Occupations: Voice actor, comedian
- Years active: 1948–1988
- Spouse: Karen De Luce (birth name Dolores Irene Luse) (m. 1961)

Merle Herman Coffman, better known by his stage name Red Coffey (April 24, 1923 – August 1, 1988), was an American voice actor and comedian known for playing Quacker in the Tom and Jerry cartoons at the Metro-Goldwyn-Mayer cartoon department from 1950 to 1957.

== Early life ==
Coffey was born in Arkansas City, Kansas and grew up in Cushing, Oklahoma. He served as a glider pilot flying missions over France in World War II. He took up the sport of bowling while stationed at Dodge City Army Air Field and took his bowling gear on the road while performing. His nightclub comic act included singing, dancing, and imitations and he performed at the Shara, Last Frontier New Frontier Hotel and Casino, and El Rancho Vegas hotels on the Las Vegas strip working in an act through the 1950s with Jerry Wallace. He was also a songwriter, collaborating with Mike Riley on the song "By Your Side". Coffey also appeared on KTTV's The Dude Martin Show and spent 1960 in a company of Olsen and Johnson's Hellzapoppin', which toured the United States with the Harlem Globetrotters.

== Animation career ==
Coffey's first role in animation appears to have been in MGM's Tom and Jerry short Little Quacker (released January 7, 1950), and he subsequently was hired to play the little duck in another six cartoons between 1953 and 1958. After William Hanna and Joseph Barbera left MGM and opened their own studio in 1957, they hired Coffey to play a duck similar to Quacker in cartoons such as Slumber Party Smarty and Duck in Luck with Yogi Bear, and Augie Doggie and Doggie Daddy, Pixie and Dixie and Mr. Jinks and Loopy De Loop. However, when Hanna and Barbera turned the character into Yakky Doodle and gave him his own series in 1961 as part of The Yogi Bear Show, Los Angeles children's show host Jimmy Weldon was hired for the role. Coffey finally received a screen credit for the Hanna-Barbera cartoon This Is My Ducky Day starring Loopy De Loop, but his name was spelled Red Coffee. Coffey apparently changed the spelling of his stage name around 1960.
