= Augie Doggie and Doggie Daddy =

American animated television series

- Genre: Comedy; Slice of Life
- Created by: William Hanna; Joseph Barbera
- Written by: Michael Maltese
- Directed by: William Hanna; Joseph Barbera
- Voices of: Daws Butler; Doug Young
- Theme music composer: William Hanna; Joseph Barbera
- Composers: Hoyt Curtin; Capitol Hi-Q Library
- Country of origin: United States
- Original language: English
- No. of seasons: 3
- No. of episodes: 45

Production
- Producers: William Hanna; Joseph Barbera
- Production company: Hanna-Barbera Productions

Original release
- Network: First-run syndication
- Release: September 19, 1959 – October 20, 1961

Augie Doggie and Doggie Daddy are two Hanna-Barbera cartoon characters who debuted on The Quick Draw McGraw Show and appeared in their own segment. The segments centered on the misadventures of a dachshund father-and-son team. Doggie Daddy (voiced by Doug Young with a Brooklyn accent, based on a Jimmy Durante impersonation) tried to do the best he could at raising his rambunctious son (a daughter in Jellystone!) Augie (voiced by Daws Butler). The characters have made appearances outside of their series, including in their own video game and in Yogi's Ark Lark and its spin-off series.

== Summary ==
The segments centered around the misadventures of a dachshund father-and-son team. Doggie Daddy (voiced by Doug Young) tried to do the best he could at raising his rambunctious son Augie (voiced by Daws Butler). Augie, who loved his father, would often refer to him as "dear old Dad". Their mutual admiration included Daddy gently chiding, "Augie, my son, my son", when he would disappoint his father; and when his son would say or do something that inspired pride, Daddy would turn to the audience and say with a grin, "Dat's my boy who said dat!"

The segments and characters were similar to the Spike and Tyke cartoons William Hanna and Joseph Barbera produced during their theatrical animation careers at Metro-Goldwyn-Mayer in the 1940s and 1950s.

== Theme song ==
A 45 rpm record released at the height of the show's popularity featured the show's theme song. The lyrics included this chorus:

Augie Dog was feeling sad till he learned from Doggie Dad—
Ears can flop and tails can sway—flippity, floppity, wiggledy, waggledy—
All of your troubles away.

An instrumental version of the song was used as the introductory theme to each cartoon.

== Character information ==
=== Augie Doggie ===
Augie is a highly spirited male pup who is motivated by ambition and the desire to make his father proud. He is typically seen wearing only a green shirt. Possessing some knowledge in science and the ability to converse with animals, Augie would often capitalize upon his father's foibles. Daws Butler voiced the character. In the series Jellystone!, Augie is depicted as female.

=== Doggie Daddy ===
The smooth-talking Doggie Daddy attempts to provide strict parental guidance to Augie, often to Augie's displeasure. Doggie Daddy is usually depicted wearing only a purple collar. Despite his strictness, Doggie Daddy has a warm personality and typically acquiesces to his son's wishes. Doug Young voiced Doggie Daddy as a Jimmy Durante impersonation.

== Episodes ==
=== Series overview ===
Season	Episodes	Originally released	
Season	Episodes	First released	Last released
1	26	September 19, 1959	March 12, 1960
2	13	September 20, 1960	December 3, 1960
3	6	September 15, 1961	October 20, 1961

=== Season 1 (1959–60) ===
No. overall	No. in season	Title	Original release date
1	1	"Fox Hound Hounded Fox"	September 19, 1959
Tired of getting small toy foxes for his birthday every year, Doggie Daddy allows Augie to go into the woods for a real one.
2	2	"Watch Dog Augie"	September 26, 1959
Augie is permitted by his father to guard their home for one night.
3	3	"Skunk You Very Much"	October 3, 1959
Augie befriends a skunk, much to his father's dislike.
4	4	"In the Picnic of Time"	October 10, 1959
An ant takes a beating from Doggie Daddy, then decides to assemble some troops to get back at him.
5	5	"High & Flighty"	October 17, 1959
Augie comes up with a flying saucer and heads into orbit.
6	6	"Nag, Nag, Nag"	October 24, 1959
Augie wants to keep a horse at home but his father is reluctant.
7	7	"Talk It Up Pup"	October 31, 1959
For unknown reasons, Augie won't speak to his father.
8	8	"Tee Vee or Not Tee Vee"	November 7, 1959
A neighborhood child challenges Augie if his father ever starred on television. Doggie Daddy goes for it.
9	9	"Big Top Pop"	November 14, 1959
Augie decides to live a life in the circus. His father then follows.
10	10	"Million Dollar Robbery"	November 21, 1959
Augie steals a sack of cash from a bank to pay his father's bills, or so Doggie Daddy thinks.
11	11	"Pup Plays Pop"	November 28, 1959
Augie Doggie and Doggie Daddy exchange roles.
12	12	"Pop's Nature Pup"	December 5, 1959
Augie and his father go camping.
13	13	"Good Mouse Keeping"	December 12, 1959
The duo tries to get rid of an annoying mouse from their home.
14	14	"Whatever Goes Pup"	December 19, 1959
Doggie Daddy drinks a potion made by his son and starts to become airborne.
15	15	"Cat Happy Pappy"	December 26, 1959
Doggie Daddy teaches his son how to deal with a vicious cat.
16	16	"Ro-Butler"	January 7, 1960
Augie invents a robot to be a servant to the household.
17	17	"Pipsqueak Pop"	January 9, 1960
Doggie Daddy applies another potion made by his son and shrinks.
18	18	"Fan Clubbed"	January 16, 1960
Because Augie's favorite hero wouldn't show up on his birthday, Doggie Daddy, in disguise, takes charge.
19	19	"Crow Cronies"	January 23, 1960
A sly crow tricks the duo to providing him hospitality.
20	20	"Gone to the Ducks"	January 30, 1960
An orphaned duck wishes to join the family.
21	21	"Mars Little Precious"	February 6, 1960
A baby alien is sent to be baby-sat by Augie.
22	22	"Swats the Matter"	February 13, 1960
Three mosquitoes infiltrate the duo's home.
23	23	"Snagglepuss"	February 20, 1960
Augie adopts a run-away circus lion.
24	24	"Hum Sweet Hum"	February 27, 1960
A wiley alley cat tries to get Augie's trained hummingbird before his "big TV appearance".
25	25	"Peck o' Trouble"	March 5, 1960
A nutty woodpecker insists on staying at Augie's house, despite Doggie Daddy's objections.
26	26	"Fuss & Feathers"	March 12, 1960
An ostrich hatches from an egg that rolls into the Doggie hen house and Augie decides to adopt it.

=== Season 2 (1960) ===
No. overall	No. in season	Title	Original release date
27	1	"Yuk, Yuk Duck"	September 20, 1960
The orphaned duck pays them a visit to their home.
28	2	"It's a Mice Day"	September 22, 1960
Augie tries to cure his friend, a sick mouse, but a cat is on the loose and is eventually shrunk by Augie with his shrinking chemical.
29	3	"Bud Brothers"	September 24, 1960
Augie creates a voracious plant that starts eating all the food.
30	4	"Pint Giant"	October 1, 1960
While Augie tries to find a giant that only exists in a fable, his father attempts to make it a reality through disguise.
31	5	"It's a Worm Day"	October 8, 1960
Fearing that he might lose his worth as a father, Doggie Daddy attempts to eliminate a bookworm from the library.
32	6	"Patient Pop"	October 15, 1960
Doggie Daddy acts as a sick patient to play along with his son, but a cat bothers patient Doggie Daddy.
33	7	"Let's Duck Out"	October 22, 1960
While the duo are having a winter trip, they are greeted again by the orphaned duck.
34	8	"The Party Lion"	October 29, 1960
A lion (Snagglepuss) escapes from the zoo and acts as a rug in the two dogs' home.
35	9	"The Musket-Tears"	November 5, 1960
Doggie Daddy makes up stories about him being one of the musketeers just to impress his child.
36	10	"Horse Fathers"	November 12, 1960
Doggie Daddy receives a horse for his birthday from Augie.
37	11	"Playmate Pup"	November 19, 1960
Augie makes up an imaginary friend.
38	12	"Little Wonder"	November 26, 1960
Doggie Daddy plans to make a real genius out of his son.
39	13	"Treasure Jest"	December 3, 1960
Augie and a British parrot go treasure hunting.

=== Season 3 (1961) ===
No. overall	No. in season	Title	Original release date
40	1	"Ape to Z"	September 15, 1961
Augie befriends a gorilla and tries to keep it indoors.
41	2	"Growing, Growing Gone"	September 22, 1961
Augie starts to go on a journey on his own to prove to his dad that he's grown up.
42	3	"Dough-Nutty"	September 29, 1961
Augie gets his hands on a money-counterfeiting machine. The owner attempts to get it back from him. Augie puts on a circus act for a request by the owner so he can get the money since Augie hid it.
43	4	"Party Pooper Pop"	October 6, 1961
Doggie Daddy gives pointers to Augie on how to impress the guests at the party next door.
44	5	"Hand to Mouse"	October 13, 1961
Doggie Daddy wants Bigelow Mouse to leave the house, but he refuses.
45	6	"Vacation Tripped"	October 20, 1961
Augie and Doggie Daddy goes on a hunting trip to Mars, encountering a wacky Martian "rabbit".

== In other languages ==
- Croatian: Ogi i Dogi
- Portuguese: Bibo Pai e Bobi Filho
- Spanish: Canuto y Canito
- Italian: Tatino e Papino / Tatino e Tatone
- Japanese: オギーとダディー (Augie and Daddy)
- French: Jappy et Pappy Toutou
- Finnish: Pik Haukku ja Isioo Haukku
- Polish: Augie i Daddy
- Czech: Alík a psí taťka
- German: Pit und Pitty

== Other appearances ==
- Augie Doggie and Doggie Daddy appeared in Yogi's Ark Lark, its spin-off series Yogi's Gang, Laff-A-Lympics, and Yogi's Treasure Hunt. John Stephenson voiced Doggie Daddy in those appearances since Young was first caring for his ailing wife at the time. They also appeared in Casper's First Christmas, Yogi's First Christmas, Yogi Bear's All Star Comedy Christmas Caper, and Yogi Bear and the Magical Flight of the Spruce Goose.
- Doggie Daddy appears in The Good, the Bad, and Huckleberry Hound.
- Augie Doggie and Doggie Daddy appear in the "Fender Bender 500" segment of Wake, Rattle, and Roll. They drive a doghouse-modeled monster truck called the Lucky Trucky.
- Doggie Daddy and Auggie Doggie appear in Yo Yogi!, respectively voiced by Stephenson and Patric Zimmerman. The former is the owner of the Jellystone Mall while the latter is his heir.
- Doggie Daddy makes a cameo appearance in the Family Guy episode "Brothers & Sisters".
- Augie Doggie and Doggie Daddy make a cameo appearance in the Web Premiere Toons short "Law and Doggie".
- Augie Doggie and Doggie Daddy make a cameo appearance in the Super Bowl XLVI commercial "Everyone".
- Augie Doggie and Doggie Daddy appear in Harvey Birdman, Attorney at Law, respectively voiced by Chris Edgerly and Maurice LaMarche.
- Doggie Daddy makes a cameo appearance in the I Am Weasel episode "I Am My Lifetime".
- Augie Doggie appears in DC Comics' The Snagglepuss Chronicles.
- Augie Doggie and Doggie Daddy appear in DC Comics' Deathstroke/Yogi Bear Special #1 as captured animals alongside other Hanna-Barbera characters.
- Augie Doggie and Doggie Daddy make a cameo appearance in the Animaniacs segment "Suffragette City".
- Augie Doggie and Doggie Daddy appear in Jellystone!, respectively voiced by Georgie Kidder and C.H. Greenblatt. This version of Augie is female and was created through a deal Doggie Daddy made with a sea hag (referencing the original 1989 Disney adaptation of The Little Mermaid) according to the episode "The Big Stink", while Doggie Daddy is highly overprotective and cannot stand to be away from her.
- Doggie Daddy makes a cameo appearance in the Teen Titans Go! episode "Warner Bros. 100th Anniversary".

== Video game ==
A video game featuring and named for the characters was released in 1991 for the Commodore 64.

== See also ==
- Quick Draw McGraw
- List of works produced by Hanna-Barbera
