= Yogi the Easter Bear =

1994 American TV special or program

- Genre: Adventure; Family
- Written by: Davis Doi; Jeff Holder; Scott Jeralds; Bob Onorato; Pat Ventura
- Directed by: Robert Alvarez
- Voices of: Greg Burson; Don Messick; Ed Gilbert; Jonathan Winters; Rob Paulsen; Jeff Doucette; Marsha Clark; Charlie Adler; Gregg Berger
- Composer: Steven Bramson
- Country of origin: United States

Production
- Executive producers: William Hanna; Joseph Barbera
- Producer: Davis Doi
- Running time: 46 minutes
- Production company: Hanna-Barbera Cartoons (Note: Animation outsourced to Fil-Cartoons.)

Original release
- Network: First-run syndication
- Release: April 3, 1994

Yogi the Easter Bear is an American animated television special starring Yogi Bear, produced by Hanna-Barbera and animated by Filipino animation studio Fil-Cartoons. It was broadcast in syndication on April 3, 1994. This is one of Don Messick's last voice-over roles; he suffered a debilitating stroke in 1996 and died in 1997. It would also be the last official Yogi Bear media for 16 years until the release of the live-action Yogi Bear film.

== Plot ==
Ranger Smith's boss, the Supreme Commissioner, is attending Jellystone Park's Easter Jamboree with his grandchildren. Concerned about making sure the event goes off perfectly, Smith picks out an Easter Bunny suit and orders a truckload of candy for the celebration, ordering his nearsighted guard, Mortimer, to watch over the candy truck and keep Yogi Bear away from eating any of the candy. Yogi steals the Easter Bunny outfit, dupes Mortimer into thinking he is the real Easter Bunny, and eats all the candy in the truck. Upon realizing what happened, a furious Smith pursues Yogi in a madcap chase that leaves the both of them disheveled and humiliated.

Smith threatens to deport Yogi to the Siberian Circus (just as he had threatened in the previous film), but Boo Boo offers to find the real Easter Bunny and bring him to the jamboree. Smith states that he stopped believing in the Easter Bunny after he didn't get a double-decker raspberry-filled dark chocolate egg from him, but happily appreciates Boo Boo's offer, but tells Yogi to pack his bags. Ranger Smith fears that he too will end up being transferred to Siberia by the commissioner if the jamboree fails. Yogi and Boo Boo seek out the Grand Grizzly in the mountains to see if he knows anything about the Easter Bunny's whereabouts. The cantankerous Grand Grizzly instructs Yogi and Boo Boo to seek the big ears in the sky (a hilltop resembling rabbit ears). They reach the mountain, using the park's hot air balloon, only to find that the Easter Bunny has been abducted, as he left jelly beans on the floor that read “help me”.

Behind the kidnapping is a short and deranged businessman named Paulie, whose goal is to replace all of the world's Easter eggs so people will have to buy these plastic ones, and his massive but dim-witted sidekick named Ernest. Yogi and Boo Boo follow a trail of jelly beans to the factory, where the Easter Bunny is being held captive above a vat of molten plastic. Posing as health inspectors, Yogi and Boo Boo successfully free the Easter Bunny, only to find that Mildred the Magical Easter Chicken is the one responsible for laying the Easter eggs. Yogi and Boo Boo go to the Easter Henhouse to meet her but are accosted by her guard dog (a Bull Terrier), who explicitly forbids entry to anyone except Ernest, whom the dog mistakes for the real Easter Bunny. Yogi and Boo Boo, after using a giant slingshot to crash through the henhouse's roof, escape with the chicken before Paulie and Ernest can get to her and head for Jellystone Park. A madcap chase after the chicken begins, with the Easter Bunny falling off a cliff and getting seriously injured three times.

Meanwhile, back at Jellystone Park, Smith is trying in vain to impress the children and the Commissioner at the Easter Jamboree. The stunts he tries either are ridiculously lame or fail spectacularly, and the Commissioner's grandchildren show no response except a few sarcastic claps and a stern look. The boss is on the verge of firing Ranger Smith when the Easter Bunny, Mildred, Yogi, and Boo Boo crash-land on stage, saving the day. The Commissioner changes his mind and instead promotes Ranger Smith, who decides to let Yogi stay at Jellystone; to thank Ranger Smith for believing, the miraculously healed Easter Bunny gives him what he asked for all these years: a double-decker raspberry-filled dark chocolate egg.

== Cast ==
- Greg Burson - Yogi Bear
- Don Messick - Boo Boo Bear / Ranger Smith
- Charlie Adler - Paulie
- Gregg Berger - Guard Dog / Narrator
- Marsha Clark - Female Ranger
- Jeff Doucette - Ernest
- Ed Gilbert - Supreme Commissioner Clarence / Grand Grizzly
- Rob Paulsen - Easter Bunny / Male Ranger
- Jonathan Winters - Ranger Mortimer

== Home media ==
The special was released on VHS in the United States on February 15, 1995. Two years later, it was re-released as part of Turner's Cartoon Network Video line, and re-released again in 2000 by Warner Home Video.

Warner Home Video would release Yogi the Easter Bear on DVD on February 8, 2005. The special was also included in a bundle with the 2010 film Yogi Bear in a limited DVD double pack in 2011.

== See also ==
- List of Easter films
- List of Easter television episodes
