= Ernie Newton (actor) =

American actor (1925–1996)

- Born: Ernest Newton; October 2, 1925; Duval County, Florida
- Died: April 4, 1996 (aged 70) Burbank, California

Ernest Newton (October 2, 1925–April 4, 1996) was an American actor who has been seen and heard in several roles including that of Pierre the French Parrot in the Disneyland attraction Walt Disney's Enchanted Tiki Room and the Beheaded Knight from The Haunted Mansion.

== Filmography ==
- Swing Fever (1943)
- Shady Lady (1945)
- Aaron Slick from Punkin Crick (1952)
- With a Song in My Heart (1952)
- Brigadoon (1954)
- Hey There, It's Yogi Bear (1964)
