= The Quick Draw McGraw Show =

American animated television series

- Genre: Comedy; Western
- Created by: William Hanna; Joseph Barbera
- Written by: Warren Foster; Michael Maltese; Joseph Barbera; Dan Gordon; Alex Lovy
- Directed by: William Hanna; Joseph Barbera
- Voices of: Daws Butler; Julie Bennett; Red Coffey; Vance Colvig; Elliot Field; Don Messick; Hal Smith; Jean Vander Pyl; Doug Young; Alan Reed; Mel Blanc; Bea Benaderet; Dick Beals; Bill Thompson; Nancy Russell; Paul Frees; Paula Winslowe; Penny Singleton
- Narrated by: Daws Butler; Vance Colvig; Elliot Field; Peter Leeds; Don Messick; Hal Smith; Doug Young
- Composer: Hoyt Curtin
- Country of origin: United States
- Original language: English
- No. of seasons: 3
- No. of episodes: 45 (135 segments) (list of episodes)

Production
- Producers: William Hanna; Joseph Barbera
- Running time: 22 minutes (7 minutes per segment)
- Production company: Hanna-Barbera Productions

Original release
- Network: First-run syndication
- Release: September 28, 1959 – October 20, 1961

The Quick Draw McGraw Show is an American animated cartoon television series produced by Hanna-Barbera Productions, and their third television series overall after The Ruff and Reddy Show and The Huckleberry Hound Show. Voice actor Daws Butler performed the show's title character, Quick Draw McGraw.

The show debuted in syndication on September 28, 1959, ending its run on October 20, 1961, and was sponsored by Kellogg's. The series featured three cartoons per episode, with Quick Draw and his sidekick Baba Looey appearing in the first segment, father and son dog duo Augie Doggie and Doggie Daddy in the second, and cat and mouse detectives Snooper and Blabber in the third. There were also "bumpers," mini-cartoons between the main cartoons that featured Quick Draw and other main characters on the show.

Michael Maltese wrote the stories of all the episodes. Screen Gems, the television division at the time of Columbia Pictures, originally syndicated the series. It ran on Saturday mornings on CBS for three seasons, 1963-66.

== Segments ==
=== Quick Draw McGraw ===
Quick Draw (voiced by Daws Butler) was usually depicted as a sheriff in these short films set in the American Old West. Quick Draw was often accompanied by his deputy, a Mexican burro called Baba Looey (also voiced by Butler). Although technically the sidekick, or deputy, to the main character of Sheriff Quick Draw, Baba Looey is often portrayed as the more thoughtful half of the duo; at times realizing some detail about a given situation and trying desperately without success to caution Quick Draw of a trap or other danger. The exchange would always go as follows: Baba Looey would see a fatal flaw in Quick Draw's plan, and begin voicing a warning such as "I don' thin' we should be doing...", to which Quick Draw would angrily interrupt with his frequent catchphrase, "I'll do the 'thin'in' around here and don't you forget it!" His plans would then go disastrously wrong, and Quick Draw would be forced to realize he should have listened to Baba Looey.

Quick Draw was assisted in some cartoons by his bloodhound Snuffles (voiced by Butler), who refused to work until he was given a dog biscuit, after which he would hug himself and spring into the air, floating back down to Earth.

Quick Draw spent a number of cartoons as his alter ego, the masked El Kabong, who used a guitar (a "Kabonger") to bash bad guys into submission. Writer Michael Maltese said the character was inspired by actor Douglas Fairbanks, Sr. as Zorro.

=== Augie Doggie and Doggie Daddy ===
A young dog named Augie Doggie (voiced by Daws Butler) and his father Doggie Daddy (voiced by Doug Young impersonating Jimmy Durante) have different misadventures in their life.

=== Snooper and Blabber ===
A detective cat named Super Snooper (voiced by Daws Butler impersonating Ed Gardner as the character Archie from the radio show Duffy's Tavern) and his sidekick Blabber Mouse (also voiced by Butler, originally voiced by Los Angeles radio announcer Elliot Field) work for the Super Snooper Detective Agency solving mysteries and catching criminals. In several cartoons, the duo had a private secretary named Hazel (voiced by Jean Vander Pyl with a Southern accent), who was never seen on screen.

== Episodes ==
Season	Segments	Episodes	Originally released	
Season	Segments	Episodes	First released	Last released
1	78	26	September 28, 1959	March 21, 1960
2	39	13	September 10, 1960	December 3, 1960
3	18	6	September 15, 1961	October 20, 1961

== Voice cast ==
- Daws Butler – Quick Draw McGraw, Baba Looey, Augie Doggie, Super Snooper, Blabber Mouse, Snagglepuss, Snuffles, Narrator, Various
- Doug Young – Doggie Daddy, Bigelow Mouse, Horse Face Harry, Narrator, Various
- Elliot Field – Blabber Mouse (4 early episodes), Narrator, Various
- Don Messick – Narrator, Horse Face Harry, Various

=== Additional Voices ===
- Julie Bennett – Sagebrush Sal (Quick Draw McGraw), Gisele (Snooper and Blabber)
- Red Coffey – Duckling (Augie Doggie and Doggie Daddy)
- Vance Colvig – Tombstone Jones (Quick Draw McGraw), Narrator
- Peter Leeds – Narrator (Quick Draw McGraw)
- Hal Smith – Narrator, Various
- Jean Vander Pyl – Hazel (Snooper and Blabber), Mrs. J. Evil Scientist (Snooper and Blabber), Various
- Penny Singleton - Witch, Peggy Poodle
- Alan Reed - Various
- Bea Benaderet - Various
- Dick Beals - Various
- Mel Blanc - Various
- Nancy Russell - Various
- Paul Frees - Various
- Paula Winslowe - Various

== Home media ==
Season sets of the series for the Hanna-Barbera Classics Collection label were originally announced by Warner Bros. for release in 2006, but were later cancelled due to the poor condition of the masters as well as the music rights issues. In 2006, a Warner spokesperson said of the DVDs, "They were pulled because significant remastering work needed to be researched." Four episodes are available on DVD, the first two episodes on Saturday Morning Cartoons 1960s: Vol. One and the other two on Saturday Morning Cartoons 1960s: Vol. Two.

The series is set to be released on Blu-ray from Warner Archive restored from the original camera negatives, originally planned to release on September 29, 2026. However due to production delays the Blu-ray set had been pushed back to October 20 of the same year.

== Current TV broadcasts ==
Restored episodes of the Quick Draw McGraw Show began airing on the MeTV Toons channel in the USA on September 21, 2026.

== Baba Booey mispronunciation ==
On the July 26, 1990, broadcast of The Howard Stern Show, executive producer Gary Dell'Abate was talking about the animation cels that he buys and collects. When attempting to say 'Quick Draw and Baba Looey', he accidentally said 'Quick Draw and Baba Booey'. He said later that talking about it would last a few hours. But since then, hundreds of 'Baba Booey' song parodies have been played on The Howard Stern Show. In addition, 'Baba Booey' was often yelled out during live news broadcasts. Until recently, it was also frequently yelled at golf tournaments after the ball was struck.

== See also ==
- List of Hanna-Barbera characters
- List of works produced by Hanna-Barbera Productions
- Augie Doggie and Doggie Daddy
- Snooper and Blabber
