= Ranger Smith =

Hanna-Barbera cartoon character

- The Yogi Bear Show character
- Ranger Smith from The Yogi Bear Show
- First appearance: Yogi Bear's Big Break (1958)
- Created by: William Hanna; Joseph Barbera
- Portrayed by: Russ Horner (Yogi's Picnic); Tom Cavanagh (2010 film)
- Voiced by: Daws Butler (1958–1959); Don Messick (1958–1996); Greg Burson (1991; Yo Yogi!); Billy West (Cartoon Network, 1990s commercials); Corey Burton (1999–2002; Spümcø shorts); Scott Innes (briefly); Jeff Bergman (2001–present); Tom Cavanagh (Yogi Bear: The Video Game); Eric Bauza (Quicken Loans commercial)

In-universe information
- Nickname: Mr. Ranger
- Species: Human
- Gender: Male
- Family: Slippery Smith (evil twin)
- Relatives: Yogi Bear (rival/friend); Boo-Boo Bear (friend); Cindy Bear (friend)

John Smith, more commonly referred to as Ranger Smith (and known as Mr. Ranger by Yogi and Boo-Boo), is a fictional park ranger first appearing in the 1958 Yogi Bear cartoon series. He is Yogi's main antagonist, and appears in other Yogi Bear series, including Yogi's Gang (1973), Yogi's Treasure Hunt (1985), and Yo Yogi! (1991), as well as the 2010 live-action Yogi Bear film. He has been primarily voiced by Don Messick and Greg Burson.

== History ==
=== Character ===
A former US Army soldier, he is the serious and stern authority figure in Jellystone Park, in contrast to the antics of the troublesome Yogi, and he greatly disapproves of Yogi's picnic basket thievery, mainly because it repels parkgoers and creates extra work for him.

In the original Yogi Bear shorts on Huckleberry Hound, a different and unnamed character that would evolve into Ranger Smith had a much different appearance, looking older, and with a white mustache, though his voice was the same (this character model was eventually used for Smith's boss in later specials), and other rangers also served as the authority figures in early episodes. Even after his trademark appearance had been established, Ranger Smith's design was notably inconsistently drawn throughout each episode of The Yogi Bear Show. In one episode, he appears as his young self, but this may be his first actual encounter with Yogi, as he does not appear to recognize him and refers to Yogi as "that bear".

Ranger Smith is sometimes very friendly with Yogi. In other episodes, he wants nothing more than to send Yogi away to the zoo. The attitudes of the Ranger towards Yogi usually parallel Yogi's behavior; if Yogi is up to mischief, then Smith wants to be rid of him; if Yogi is trying to behave himself, the ranger is often supportive. He seems to have a deep-down, if not grudging, respect for Yogi. Although the two have a somewhat antagonistic relationship, if serious trouble were to befall one of them, the other usually attempts to rescue him. They also have a long-running, friendly rivalry.

Ranger Smith genuinely likes Boo-Boo, because Boo-Boo always tries to stay out of trouble, unlike Yogi. Some episodes have Ranger Smith answering to his superior, the park commissioner.

== Reception and significance ==
Ranger Smith, together with similar children's characters such as Ranger Rick and Disney's Ranger Woodlore, has become a stereotype of the American park ranger. This had led to some complaints from the park rangers about their job being misunderstood and not treated seriously by the public, as these stereotypes fail to recognize some park rangers are law enforcement officers.

== Portrayers ==
From the time of the character's debut until 1996, Ranger Smith was voiced by Don Messick, using his natural voice. His last performance as the character was in Yogi the Easter Bear.

In Yo Yogi!, the character was known as Officer Smith and voiced by Greg Burson.

In the Spümcø shorts, Ranger Smith is voiced by Corey Burton.

Although more famous for his work in the Scooby-Doo franchise, Scott Innes briefly voiced Ranger Smith, as well.

In the Yogi Bear film, the character is portrayed by Tom Cavanagh.

=== Others ===
- Daws Butler ("Yogi Bear's Big Break" and "Be My Guest Pest")
- Frank Milano (1961, 1964; Songs of Yogi Bear and his Pals LP and Hey There, It's Yogi Bear! LP)
- Mike Stewart (1962; How to Be a Better-Than-the Average Child Without Really Trying!)
- Tony Pope (This Land is Our Land: The Yogi Bear Environmental Album)
- Billy West (Cartoon Network, 1990s commercials)
- Jeff Bergman (2001, 2018, 2021–present; Lullabye-Bye Bear, Yogi Bear slot machine, Jellystone!)
- Seth Green (2008, 2013; Robot Chicken, Mad)
- Tom Cavanagh (Yogi Bear: The Video Game)
- Mikey Day (2011; Mad)
- Jamie Kaler (2012; Robot Chicken)
- Eric Bauza (Quicken Loans commercial)

== Animated media ==
=== Television shows ===
- The Huckleberry Hound Show (1958–1960)
- The Yogi Bear Show (1961–1962)
- Yogi's Gang (1973) (episodes "Mr. Prankster", "The Gossipy Witch", and "Lotta Litter")
- Laff-A-Lympics (1977) (episode "Quebec, Canada and Baghdad, Iraq")
- Yogi's Treasure Hunt (1985–1986)
- The New Yogi Bear Show (1988)
- A Pup Named Scooby-Doo (1988) (episode "The Story Stick")
- Yo Yogi! (1991) (voiced by Greg Burson)
- I Am Weasel (1998) (episode "I Am My Lifetime")
- Harvey Birdman, Attorney at Law (2002) (episode "Identity Theft")
- Jellystone! (2021)

=== Films and specials ===
- Hey There, It's Yogi Bear! (1964)
- Yogi's First Christmas (1980)
- Yogi Bear's All Star Comedy Christmas Caper (1982)
- Yogi's Great Escape (1987)
- Yogi and the Invasion of the Space Bears (1988)
- A Yabba Dabba Doo Celebration: 50 Years of Hanna-Barbera (1989)
- Yogi the Easter Bear (1994)
- Boo Boo Runs Wild and A Day in the Life of Ranger Smith (1999) (voiced by Corey Burton)
- Boo Boo and the Man (2000)
- Yogi Bear (2010) (portrayed by Tom Cavanagh)

=== Video games ===
- Yogi Bear: Great Balloon Blast (2000)
- Yogi Bear: The Video Game (2010)

== See also ==
- List of Hanna-Barbera characters
- List of Range Smith live action actors
- List of Yogi Bear characters
- The Yogi Bear Show
- The New Yogi Bear Show
- Yogi's Treasure Hunt
