= Hey There, It's Yogi Bear! =

1964 film by William Hanna and Joseph Barbera

- Theatrical release poster
- Directed by: Joseph Barbera; William Hanna
- Screenplay by: Joseph Barbera; Warren Foster; William Hanna
- Based on: The Yogi Bear Show by William Hanna and Joseph Barbera
- Produced by: Joseph Barbera; William Hanna
- Starring: Daws Butler; Don Messick; Julie Bennett
- Edited by: Larry C. Cowan; Donald A. Douglas; Warner E. Leighton; Anthony Milch; Joe Ruby; Ken Spears; Greg Watson
- Music by: Marty Paich; Songs: Ray Gilbert; David Gates; Doug Goodwin
- Production company: Hanna-Barbera Productions (Note: The rights to the individual characters are presently owned by Warner Bros.)
- Distributed by: Columbia Pictures
- Release date: June 3, 1964
- Running time: 89 minutes
- Country: United States
- Language: English
- Box office: $1.13 million (US/Canada)

Hey There, It's Yogi Bear! is a 1964 American animated musical comedy film produced by Hanna-Barbera Productions and released by Columbia Pictures. The film stars the voices of Daws Butler, Don Messick, Julie Bennett, Mel Blanc, and J. Pat O'Malley.

This film marks the second time that a character originating in short cartoons was given an expanded role sustaining an entire feature with a single storyline. The first was Mister Magoo in 1959's 1,001 Arabian Nights. Previously, extended appearances by characters associated with shorts were limited to special sequences within features (Tom and Jerry in Anchors Aweigh, Mickey Mouse in Fantasia), bridges and framing continuity in "package" features (Donald Duck in The Three Caballeros), or featurettes (Popeye Meets Ali Baba's Forty Thieves).

Based upon Hanna-Barbera's syndicated animated television show The Yogi Bear Show, Hey There, It's Yogi Bear! was also the first theatrical feature produced by Hanna-Barbera, and the first feature-length theatrical animated film based on a television program. In keeping with the limited animation of the television series, the film was not fully animated, but did contain more detailed animation work than the show, as well as a fully-orchestrated score and original songs.

== Plot ==
Boo-Boo Bear wakes up from winter hibernation, excited about the new Spring. Then Yogi Bear wakes up, only interested in finding some food to eat. Cindy Bear unsuccessfully tries to woo Yogi. After Ranger Smith thwarts Yogi's latest attempts to grab some food, Yogi gets angry and convinces the Ranger to transfer him out of Jellystone National Park. Smith prepares Yogi to be sent to the San Diego Zoo along with an identification tag. Yogi first says goodbye to everything, but tricks another bear named Corn Pone into going to California in his place. Boo-Boo and Cindy are unaware of this, thinking Yogi has departed for good.

Soon, Yogi is stealing food from all over the park under the alter ego "The Brown Phantom". Smith believes "The Brown Phantom" is a mysterious bear-like vigilante whom the Park Commissioner hired to replace Yogi, and scares away all of the Jellystone goers and gobbles their food up shortly after stealing it. He threatens whoever it is to be sent to the zoo and comes up with a clever plan to stop "The Brown Phantom" and save the park, not knowing it is actually Yogi.

Cindy, wishing to be with Yogi at the zoo, angers Smith into mistakenly sending her away. However, she gets sent to the St. Louis Zoo by train instead, as the San Diego Zoo does not need any more bears. When she realizes her true destination, she gets very sad, crying since she knows she would be far from Yogi now. Late that night, Cindy falls out of the train and becomes lost. A traveling circus, run by the Chizzling Brothers, is looking for a great act to raise their ratings, when suddenly, their dog Mugger runs off and scares Cindy into walking on the telephone wires, the perfect act to save their circus.

Yogi has recently missed Boo-Boo and, above all, Cindy. On his way back to talk to Ranger Smith, Yogi finds that Cindy had gone missing on the way to the St. Louis zoo. Ranger Smith, wanting to send Yogi back to the San Diego zoo, is locked in a closet while Yogi and Boo-Boo escape from Jellystone to find Cindy. After an extensive travel, Yogi and Boo-Boo locate Cindy, who is being kept a prisoner, forced to perform her high-wire act for the Chizzling Brother's circus. As Yogi confronts the manager, Grifter Chizzing, he is tricked into joining Cindy in her cage, where Grifter tells him he's now in "show biz." Boo-Boo releases Yogi and Cindy and they make their exit.

Meanwhile, Ranger Smith decides to let them find their way home to avoid trouble with the Park Commissioner. As Yogi, Cindy, and Boo-Boo make their way home, they crash a barnyard party, somehow escaping afloat a river with the barn's door. Then, while Cindy & Yogi dream about a honeymoon in Venice, they find themselves suddenly being chased and hunted by the police, as they somehow became fugitives, but make their escape.

They hitch a ride in a moving van, but find themselves in the middle of a busy city (later revealed to be New York City) and make a run from the police to the top of a hotel and across to a high rise under construction. The next morning, Ranger Smith sees the three bears on television and decides to rescue them in a helicopter. With all the commotion having made great publicity for Jellystone, Ranger Smith gets promoted to Chief Ranger by the Park Commissioner in gratitude while bringing all three bears back to Jellystone, where they promise to be "good bears" from now on.

== Cast ==
- Daws Butler as Yogi Bear
  - James Darren as Yogi Bear (singing "Ven-e, Ven-o, Ven-a")
  - Bill Lee as Yogi Bear (singing "Ash Can Parade", "Whistle Your Way Back Home" and "Yogi Loves Cindy")
- Don Messick as Boo-Boo Bear, Ranger Smith, Mugger
  - Ernest Newton as Boo-Boo Bear (singing)
- Julie Bennett as Cindy Bear
  - Jackie Ward as Cindy Bear (singing)
- Mel Blanc as Grifter Chizzling
- Jean Vander Pyl as the Barn Dance Woman
- Hal Smith as Corn Pone, Moose
- J. Pat O'Malley as Snively Chizzling

=== Uncredited ===
- Allan Melvin as the Police Sergeant
- Jonah and the Wailers as the singing voices of the zoo-bound bears performing "St. Louis"
- Thurl Ravenscroft as the black-haired policemen
- Daws Butler as Airplane Pilot, Ranger Tom
- Don Messick as Ranger Jones, Yogi's conscience, the blonde-haired policemen, TV Reporter, Airport Manager
- Mel Blanc as Southern Accented Bear in Train, Mugger The Dog (grumbling sounds)

== Production ==
The animated musical film was produced and directed by William Hanna and Joseph Barbera, with a story by Hanna, Barbera, and former Warner Bros. Cartoons storyman Warren Foster. Another Warner Cartoons alumnus, Friz Freleng, served as story supervisor. When the Warner Bros. Cartoons studio closed in 1963, several of its animators, including Gerry Chiniquy and Ken Harris, also joined Hanna-Barbera to work on this film.

=== Promotion ===
The film was supported by a cross-media promotional campaign that drew on Yogi Bear's established television and merchandising presence. Colpix Records prepared extensive merchandising for the film's soundtrack album, while contemporary theatrical promotion included television appearances, promotional giveaways, and local publicity stunts. Columbia's pressbook also promoted tie-ins with television stations carrying The Yogi Bear Show, newspaper comic strips, the soundtrack album, and an 8 mm promotional film.

Page from the 1964 Columbia Pictures pressbook outlining television, newspaper, soundtrack, and 8 mm promotional tie-ins for the film.

=== Reception ===
A review from the May 27, 1964, issue of Variety pointed out that the scarcity of theatrically released feature animated films made Hey There, It's Yogi Bear! highly marketable. The review called the film "artistically accomplished in all departments". The review commented that the script was a bit redundant, but that the songs were "pleasant, if not especially distinguished".

After its 1964 release, the film was reissued on January 17, 1986, as part of Atlantic Releasing Corporation's short-lived Clubhouse Pictures label.

== Home media ==
The film was released on VHS two times in the United States in the 1980s by Paramount Home Video and KVC Home Video. GoodTimes Home Video re-released it in 1992. These releases use the 1986 Clubhouse Pictures reissue version.

On December 2, 2008, Warner Home Video released the film on DVD in North America. Unlike a concurrent DVD release of another Hanna-Barbera feature, The Man Called Flintstone, it is presented in 1.78:1 anamorphic widescreen (both films were animated in 1.33:1 and matted to 1.85:1 for theaters). A R2 DVD was released in the UK on January 31, 2011, and is also presented in 1.78:1.

The film was released on Blu-ray under the Warner Archive Collection on May 30, 2023. Unlike the previous releases however, the original Columbia Pictures opening logo is left intact.

== See also ==
- List of American films of 1964
