= Wally Gator =

American animated television series

- Title card.
- Genre: Comedy
- Directed by: William Hanna; Joseph Barbera
- Voices of: Daws Butler; Don Messick
- Country of origin: United States
- Original language: English
- No. of episodes: 52

Production
- Producers: William Hanna; Joseph Barbera
- Running time: 24 minutes
- Production company: Hanna-Barbera Productions

Original release
- Network: First-run syndication
- Release: September 3, 1962 – August 26, 1963

Wally Gator is an American animated television series produced by Hanna-Barbera Productions that originally aired as one of the three segments from the syndicated block The Hanna-Barbera New Cartoon Series. The other two segments that compose the series are Touché Turtle and Dum Dum and Lippy the Lion and Hardy Har Har. The segment consisted of 52 episodes that aired from September 3, 1962, to August 26, 1963.

Wally Gator was initially voiced by Daws Butler, the voice of many other Hanna-Barbera characters of the same era. Wally appears in the HBO Max series Jellystone!, where he is portrayed as the town ditz and voiced by Jeff Bergman.

== Plot ==
Wally Gator (voiced by Daws Butler impersonating Ed Wynn) is an anthropomorphic, happy-go-lucky alligator who wears a collar and a pork pie hat. Although his catchy theme song describes him as a "swingin' alligator of the swamp," his home is in the city zoo. Mr. Twiddle (voiced by Don Messick) is the zookeeper who keeps a close watch on Wally, who likes to check out what life is like in the outside world.

== Analysis ==
Animation historian Christopher P. Lehman noted that Wally Gator follows the formula that Hanna-Barbera established in the previous series, such as the Yogi Bear series. The set up in which these shows placed an animal character within a human-controlled environment and had these characters deal with the social boundaries placed and enforced by humans. An example being: Yogi lives in a park under the care of a park ranger; Wally lives in a zoo under the supervision of a zookeeper. The theme that drives the series is Wally's desire to escape the zoo, a derivative of the Top Cat series, where the titular character keeps trying to get away from life in the alley.

Lehman notes a rather depressing underlying theme: the zoo and life in captivity seem to be the proper place for Wally. No matter how much he struggles to fit in the society of the outside world, Wally remains an "Other" and is doomed to fail. The status quo follows every unsuccessful attempt at change.

== Voice cast ==
- Daws Butler as Wally Gator
- Don Messick as Mr. Twiddle
- Mel Blanc as additional voices, such as Colonel Zachary Gator (ep. "Carpet Bragger")

== Home media ==
Episodes of Wally Gator were released on VHS many times. A DVD set release of the complete series was originally announced for 2006 from Warner Bros. for the Hanna-Barbera Classic Collection but was later canceled due to the poor condition of the masters and was delayed. In 2006, a Warner spokesperson said of the DVDs: "They were pulled because significant remastering work needed to be researched. We are exploring adding them back to the schedule next year." The first episode is available on the DVD set “Saturday Morning Cartoons 1960s Vol. 2”. The show was released on iTunes video in 2017 as part of Hanna-Barbera's 60th anniversary and was released on a made-to-order DVD set from Warner Archive on June 25, 2019. It was released on Blu-ray by Warner Archive on December 16, 2025.

== See also ==
- List of works produced by Hanna-Barbera Productions
- List of Hanna-Barbera characters
- The Hanna-Barbera New Cartoon Series
- Lippy the Lion and Hardy Har Har
- Touché Turtle and Dum Dum

== Sources ==
- Lehman, Christopher P. (2007), "The Cartoons of 1961-1962", American Animated Cartoons of the Vietnam Era: A Study of Social Commentary in Films and Television Programs, 1961-1973, McFarland & Company, ISBN 978-0786451425
