= The Yogi Bear Show =

American animated television series

- Genre: Variety show; Comedy
- Created by: William Hanna; Joseph Barbera
- Directed by: William Hanna; Joseph Barbera
- Voices of: Daws Butler; Don Messick; Julie Bennett; Jimmy Weldon; Vance Colvig
- Theme music composer: Hoyt Curtin
- Composer: Hoyt Curtin
- Country of origin: United States
- No. of seasons: 2
- No. of episodes: 33 (97 segments) (list of episodes)

Production
- Producers: William Hanna; Joseph Barbera
- Running time: 22 minutes (7 minutes per segment)
- Production company: Hanna-Barbera Productions

Original release
- Network: First-run syndication
- Release: January 30, 1961 – January 6, 1962

Related
- Yogi Bear & Friends; The Huckleberry Hound Show

The Yogi Bear Show is an American comedy animated television series, the first entry of the Yogi Bear franchise and a spin-off of The Huckleberry Hound Show, produced by Hanna-Barbera Productions. The show centers on the adventures of forest-dwelling Yogi Bear in Jellystone Park. The show debuted in syndication on January 30, 1961, and ran for 33 episodes until January 6, 1962. Two other segments for the show were Snagglepuss and Yakky Doodle. The show had a two-year production run.

== Segments ==
=== Yogi Bear ===
Yogi Bear (voiced by Daws Butler impersonating Art Carney) and Boo-Boo Bear (voiced by Don Messick) reside in Jellystone Park, and often try to steal picnic baskets while evading Ranger Smith (also voiced by Don Messick). Yogi also has a relationship with his girlfriend Cindy Bear (voiced by Julie Bennett).

=== Snagglepuss ===
Snagglepuss the Mountain Lion (voiced by Daws Butler impersonating Bert Lahr) tries to make his life hospitable while occasionally evading a hunter named Major Minor (voiced by Don Messick).

=== Yakky Doodle ===
Yakky Doodle (voiced by Jimmy Weldon in the style of Donald Duck) is a duck that lives with his best friend Chopper the Bulldog (voiced by Vance Colvig impersonating Wallace Beery). Chopper usually protected Yakky from being eaten by Fibber Fox (voiced by Daws Butler impersonating Shelley Berman) or Alfy Gator (voiced by Butler impersonating Alfred Hitchcock).

== Episodes ==
Season	Segments	Episodes	Originally released	
Season	Segments	Episodes	First released	Last released
1	48	16	January 30, 1961	May 15, 1961
2	49	17	September 16, 1961	January 6, 1962

== Broadcast ==
One out of a few different "Yogi Bear" presents cards

The Yogi Bear Show premiered on January 30, 1961, on some major city markets, although the show was not broadcast on the same day of the week, or the same time, in every city's affiliation in the United States, Canada, and the United Kingdom. Like The Huckleberry Hound Show, some major city markets picked up the program from independent stations such as WPIX in New York City, KTTV in Los Angeles, KTVU in San Francisco, WGN-TV in Chicago, and KTVT in Dallas. In Canada, the show was split into two networks, with most episodes aired on the CTV Television Network with a few CBC Television networks picking up a few episodes in syndication. In Australia, the show aired on the Nine Network. In the United Kingdom, the show had its premiere on 28th September 1962 on ITV regions Associated-Rediffusion and Ulster Television. Other regions picked it up on Christmas Day 1962.

=== Syndication ===
Only a few locally produced children's shows reran segments of The Yogi Bear Show into the 1970s and into the 1980s. Chicago's WGN-TV rarely picked up segments from The Yogi Bear Show among others on Ray Rayner and his Friends until its cancellation in 1980; and in the United Kingdom, BBC One rarely picked up segments of the show during its "Children's BBC" block in the 1980s.

The Yogi Bear Show along with mixed Yogi Bear segments from The Huckleberry Hound Show returned to television on cable-only Nickelodeon, airing from 1990 until 1993, when it then moved to the then-one-year-old Cartoon Network, along with its sister station Boomerang in 2000. The show aired on Cartoon Network until 2004 because of Boomerang airing the show during the time. From November 26 until November 30, 2020, Yogi Bear segments from both Huckleberry Hound and Yogi Bear shows returned to Boomerang for a four-day Thanksgiving weekend. Along with Huckleberry Hound being aired on the same four days, both Snagglepuss and Yakky Doodle segments were not aired during the period; instead, they were replaced by another Yogi Bear segment to fill the block in separate times. Reruns returned again on Boomerang starting in 2023. In 2025, The Yogi Bear Show started airing on MeTV Toons in its entire original half-hour format, with the back-up segments included, being the first time in decades since the show aired in the original produced form.

== Characters ==
- Yogi Bear (voiced by Daws Butler impersonating Art Carney) and Boo Boo Bear reside in Jellystone Park and often try to steal picnic baskets while evading Ranger Smith (voiced by Don Messick). Yogi also has a relationship with his girlfriend Cindy Bear.
- Boo-Boo Bear (voiced by Don Messick) is Yogi's diminutive sidekick, who tries, and never succeeds, to warn Yogi that "Mr. Ranger" would not like Yogi to steal picnic baskets. He only wears a blue bowtie.
- Ranger Smith (voiced by Don Messick) is the head ranger who argues with Yogi stealing picnic baskets. He wears a traditional ranger costume.
- Cindy Bear (voiced by Julie Bennett) is Yogi Bear's girlfriend. She speaks with a pronounced Southern accent and carries a parasol.

== Voice cast ==
Main voices

- Daws Butler - Yogi Bear, Snagglepuss, Fibber Fox, Alfy Gator, various
- Don Messick - Boo Boo Bear, Ranger Smith, Major Minor, narrator, various
- Julie Bennett - Cindy Bear
- Jimmy Weldon - Yakky Doodle
- Vance Colvig - Chopper

Additional voices

- Bea Benaderet
- Mel Blanc
- June Foray
- Hal Smith
- Bill Thompson
- Jean Vander Pyl
- Doug Young

== Spin-offs, movies, and specials ==
Following the show's cancellation in 1962, many spin-off incarnations, feature-length movies, and specials first appeared.

- Hey There, It's Yogi Bear!, a feature film, theatrically released on June 3, 1964, by Columbia Pictures.
- Yogi's Ark Lark, a televised movie, first aired on ABC on September 16, 1972, featured Yogi on a journey to find the perfect place.
- Yogi's Gang, a "sequel" series to the movie Yogi's Ark Lark, ran for one season on ABC from September 8 to December 29, 1973.
- Laff-A-Lympics, first aired on ABC from September 10, 1977, to September 9, 1978.
- Yogi's Space Race, featuring Yogi and friends in an outer space race, aired on NBC from September 9 to December 2, 1978.
- Galaxy Goof-Ups, a spin-off of Yogi's Space Race, also debuted on NBC from September 9, 1978, to December 1, 1979.
- Yogi's First Christmas, a televised holiday movie, premiered on November 22, 1980.
- Yogi Bear's All Star Comedy Christmas Caper, a holiday special, first aired on CBS on December 21, 1982.
- Yogi's Treasure Hunt, first aired as part of The Funtastic World of Hanna-Barbera on September 6, 1985, syndicated, featuring Yogi hunting for lost treasure.
- Yogi's Great Escape, a 1987 televised film, first aired part of Superstars 10.
- Yogi Bear and the Magical Flight of the Spruce Goose, a 1987 televised film, premiered part of Superstars 10.
- The New Yogi Bear Show, a 1988 update of the original 1961-62 show, first aired from September 12 to November 11, 1988, syndicated.
- Yogi and the Invasion of the Space Bears, a 1988 televised film, debuted part of Superstars 10.
- Yo Yogi!, featuring Yogi and the gang as teenagers, first aired on NBC on September 14, 1991.
- Yogi the Easter Bear, a holiday special, first aired on April 3, 1994, syndicated.
- Arabian Nights (Aliyah-Din and the Magic Lamp segment only), first aired on TBS on September 3, 1994.
- A Day in the Life of Ranger Smith and Boo Boo Runs Wild are two stand-alone shorts directed by John Kricfalusi.
- Yogi Bear, a live-action/CGI film, theatrically released in theaters on December 17, 2010, by Warner Bros.
- Jellystone! is an animated television web series released on HBO Max on July 29, 2021.

Additionally, reruns of the original series were aired on the USA Network from the mid-1980s through the early 1990s as part of their USA Cartoon Express animation block, while Nickelodeon also aired these same episodes, plus Yogi's Gang, Yogi's Space Race, and the latter's spinoff series, Galaxy Goof-Ups, during the early 1990s under the umbrella title Nickelodeon's Most Wanted: Yogi Bear.

== Home media releases ==
On November 15, 2005, Warner Home Video released The Yogi Bear Show: The Complete Series on DVD in Region 1, part of the Hanna-Barbera Golden Collection series. The set features the edited-for-syndication versions instead of the original, uncut network broadcast masters due to cost issues. A Region 2 DVD was released on January 31, 2011, then a Region 4 DVD was released on September 6, 2011. A blu-ray of the entire show (in its original uncut network broadcast mastered form) is due out from Warner Archive on November 24, 2026.

The earlier Yogi Bear cartoons from the first season of The Huckleberry Hound Show can be found on The Huckleberry Hound Show - Volume 1. In 2025, all the Yogi Bear segments from both Seasons 1 and 2 of The Huckleberry Hound Show were released as part of The Huckleberry Hound Show - The Complete Series Blu-ray box-set by the Warner Archive Collection.

Title	Ep #	Release date	Bonus features
The Yogi Bear Show - The Complete Series	33	November 15, 2005 (DVD); November 24, 2026 (Blu-ray)	Collectible animation cel; Original episode with bridges and bumpers; Never-before-seen animation sketches come to life; Yogi Gets Global: One episode in a variety of languages; Featurette on the art of Hanna-Barbera sound

== See also ==
- List of works produced by Hanna-Barbera Productions
- List of films based on Hanna-Barbera cartoons
- List of Hanna-Barbera characters
