= Yogi Bear's Jellystone Park Camp-Resorts =

North American campground operator

Logo of Yogi Bear's Jellystone Park Campground

Yogi Bear's Jellystone Park Camp-Resorts is a chain of more than 75 family friendly campgrounds throughout the United States and Canada. The camp-resort locations are independently owned and operated and each is franchised through Camp Jellystone, LLC, a wholly owned subsidiary of Sun Communities. The current President of Camp Jellystone is Robert (Rob) Schutter, Jr.

== About the Parks ==
History

Yogi Bear's Jellystone Park Camp-Resorts were founded in 1969 by Doug Haag & Robert Borkovetz. The first Jellystone Park location was built in Sturgeon Bay, Wisconsin, and still remains a part of the franchise today. The idea to start a campground came to Haag during a drive down the local highway. As he passed cars and campers on the highway, he got the idea to give families a destination where they could camp and vacation for the summer. Haag and his business partner purchased 30 acres of land in Wisconsin which would be the site of the first Jellystone Park Camp-Resort. The inspiration for the name "Jellystone Park" came as Haag overheard his children watching Yogi Bear cartoons. He set up a meeting with the Vice President of Screen Gems (then licensor of the Yogi Bear and Jellystone Park names as the syndicator of the content of Yogi Bear's studio, Hanna-Barbera) and received approval to associate the names with his campground. Ground broke on the campground in April 1969 and three months later, the campground officially opened for business. The original price to camp at that Jellystone Park location was $3.50.

Franchise Data

In 2021, Sun Communities acquired Leisure Systems Inc., the franchisor for the Yogi Bear’s Jellystone Park Camp-Resort system, for $23 million.

As of December 2023, there are more than 75 franchised Jellystone Park locations across 27 states (with the first location in Utah slated for opening in summer 2024) and four provinces in Canada. Each location is themed with Yogi Bear character elements to provide instant recognition and appeal. An estimated 2 million guests stay at a Jellystone Park Camp-Resort each year. The Yogi Bear characters (including Yogi Bear, Boo-Boo, Cindy Bear, and Ranger Smith) that often appear at the campgrounds are licensed through Hanna-Barbera Productions, a subsidiary of Warner Bros. Discovery.

Jellystone Park Standards

A prospective campground must meet certain standards before being considered as a potential Jellystone Park location. Each campground is required to have a minimum of 100 campsites and 4 full-service cabins, a commercial swimming pool that is at least 20 feet by 50 feet, first class restroom facilities, a laundry facility and a retail store. Locations are also required to have specific amenities including a children's playground, video theater and a covered pavilion. All the parks are themed with Yogi Bear elements and must promote the theme throughout the park. Individual attractions, activities, character interactions, and accommodation offerings vary by location by Jellystone Park locations are famous for their family attractions (pools, water slides, mini golf, laser tag, etc.), activities (dance parties, foam parties, wagon rides, tie dye, etc.), and a variety of interactions with Yogi Bear, Boo Boo, and Cindy Bear and deluxe RV sites and luxury accommodations including but not limited to cabins, cottages, treehouses, yurts, glamping tents, and more.

== Gallery ==
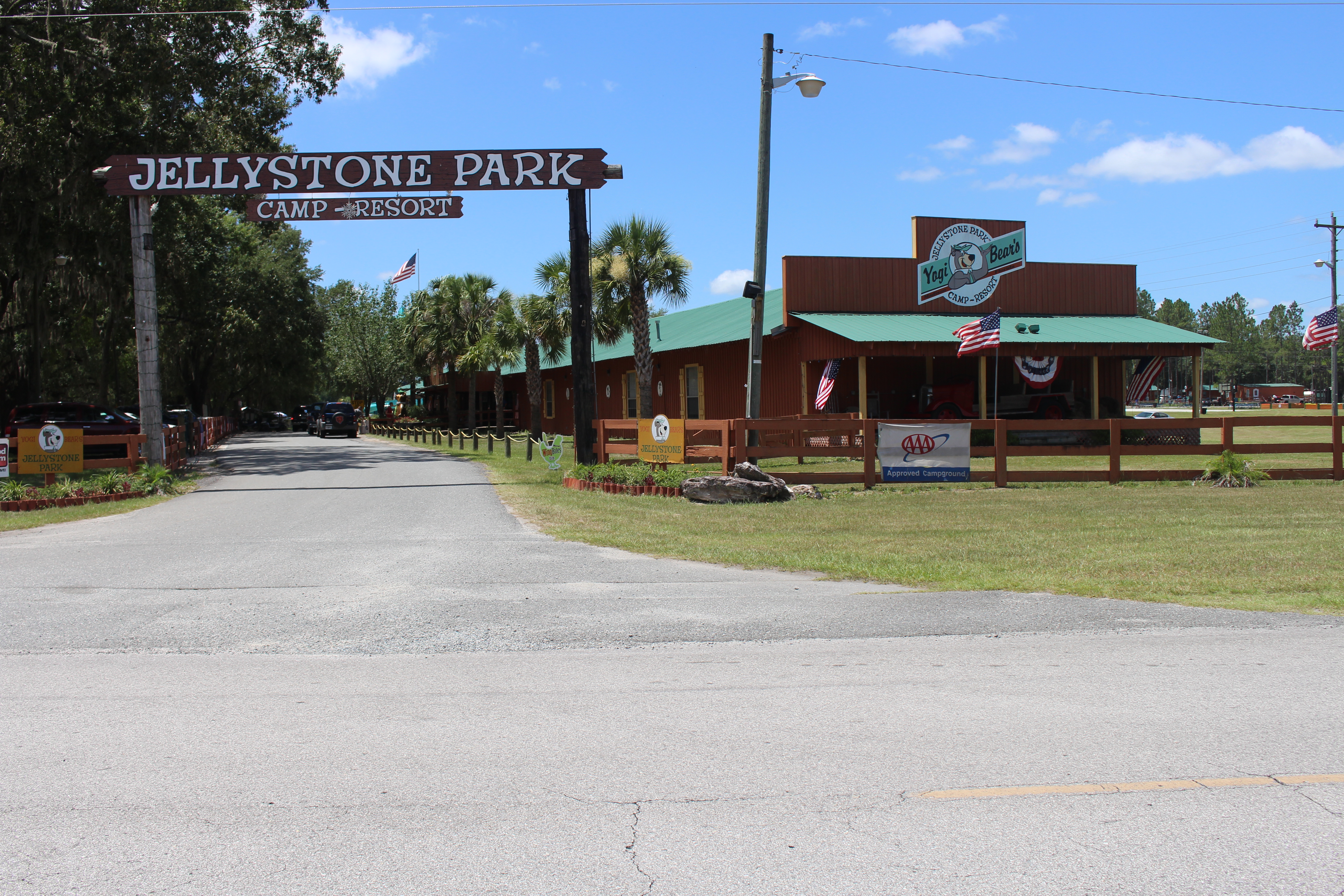

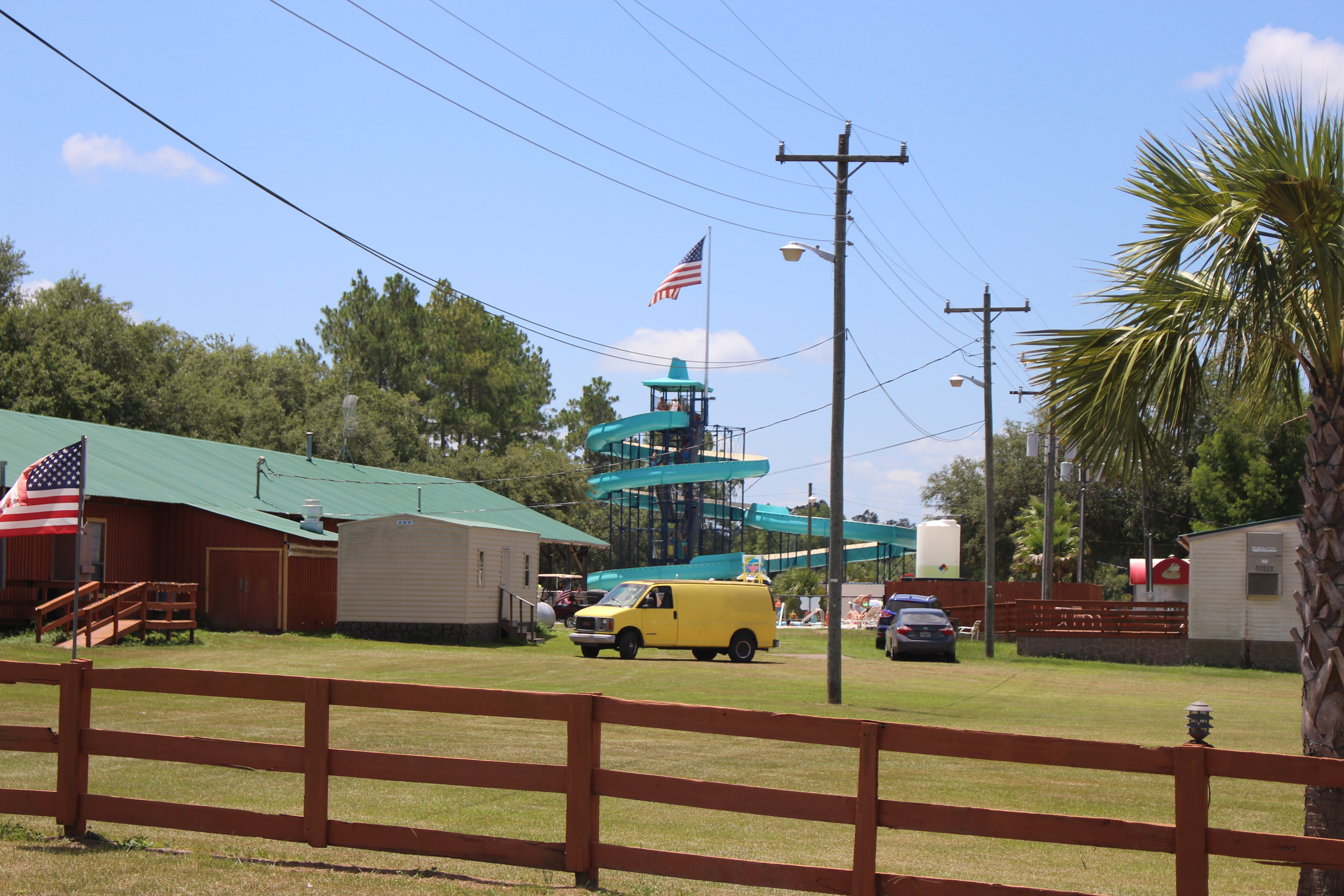

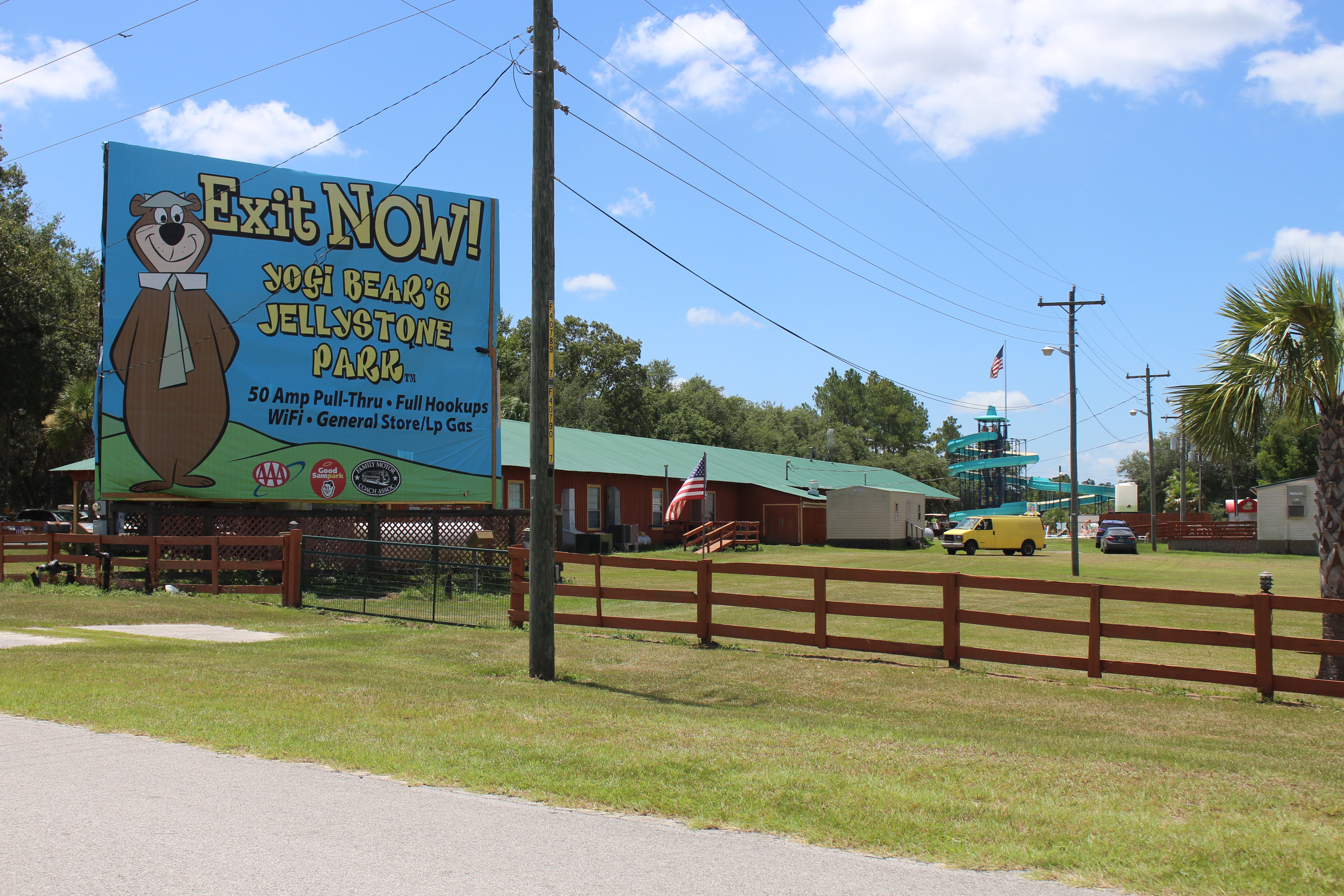

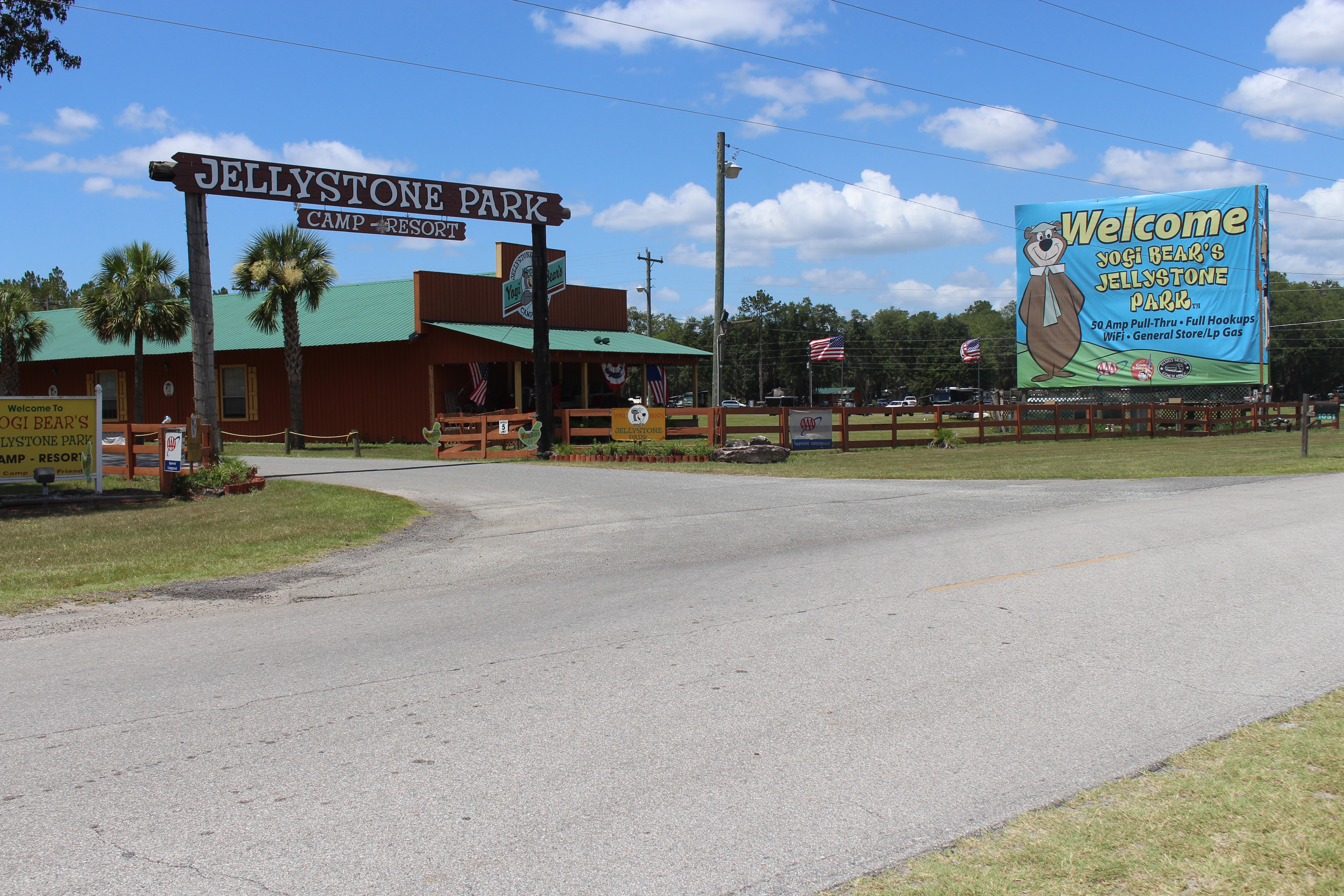

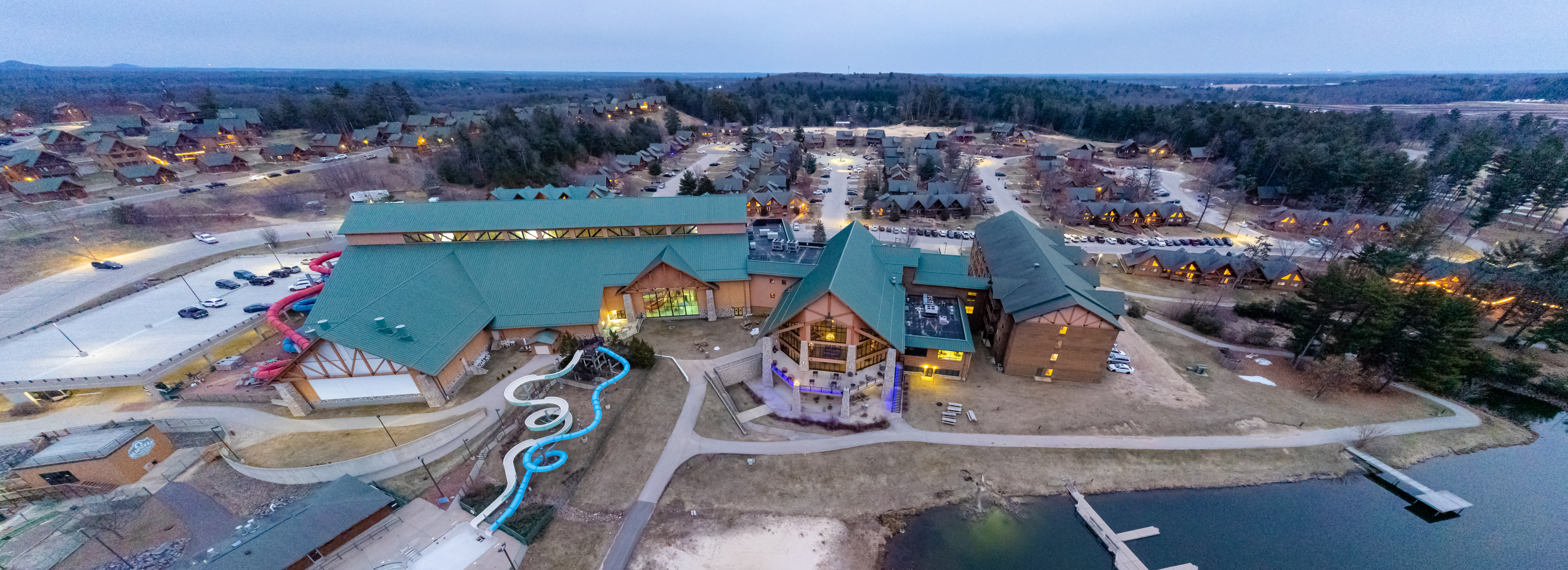
Three Bears Lodge in Warrens, Wisconsin

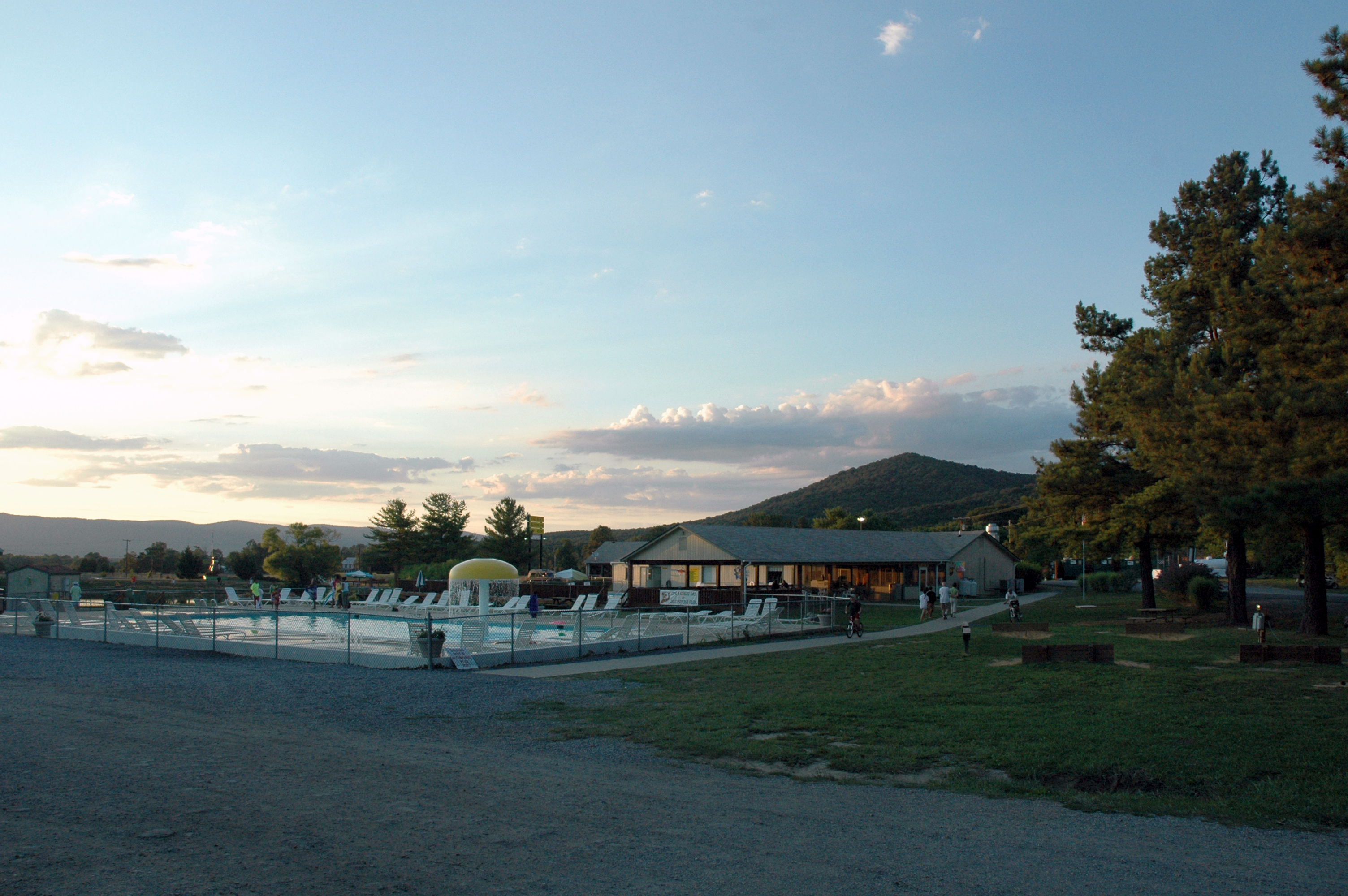
Pool at the resort near Luray, Virginia

== See also ==
- Yogi Bear
- Hanna-Barbera Land
