= A Day in the Life of Ranger Smith =

Cartoon

- Based on: The Yogi Bear Show by William Hanna and Joseph Barbera
- Developed by: John Kricfalusi
- Story by: John Kricfalusi
- Directed by: John Kricfalusi
- Voices of: Greg Burson; Corey Burton; Kevin Kolde; John Kricfalusi; Mary Ellen Thomas
- Composer: Henry Porch
- Country of origin: United States
- Original language: English

Production
- Executive producer: Kevin Kolde
- Producers: John Kricfalusi; Miles Horst; Stephen Worth
- Running time: 7 minutes
- Production companies: Spümcø; Cartoon Network Studios

Original release
- Network: Cartoon Network
- Release: September 24, 1999

Related
- Boo Boo Runs Wild

A Day in the Life of Ranger Smith is a stand-alone animated television special, and a parody of the Hanna-Barbera cartoon series The Yogi Bear Show, which revolves around Ranger Smith. The special (originally named Ranging Ranger) was made by The Ren & Stimpy Show creator John Kricfalusi and his company Spümcø and Cartoon Network Studios. A Day in the Life of Ranger Smith originally aired on Cartoon Network on September 24, 1999, along with Boo Boo Runs Wild, a similar Yogi Bear-themed stand alone special.

Since its original debut in 1999, A Day in the Life of Ranger Smith has aired on Cartoon Network's late night programming block, Adult Swim. The special was jokingly dedicated to William Hanna and Joseph Barbera, despite the two of them still being alive at that time.

This marked the final Yogi Bear production in which Greg Burson voiced Yogi. Stephen Worth replaced Burson for Boo Boo Runs Wild and Burson never voiced the character again, as he would be arrested for an incident involving three female roommates in his home in 2004 (effectively ending his career), and later died of diabetes and arteriosclerosis in 2008.

== Plot ==
Ranger Smith awakes to a depressing morning where he declares his hate of the job. He then walks outside and wakes the sun by kicking on a mountain in the foreground. Then he proceeds to walk through the forest, changing appearances every time he passes a tree, referencing his inconsistent appearance on the original show. His mood improves as he walks through the forest. He then finds a squirrel holding acorns and demands to see a license for them. When the squirrel doesn't produce one, Ranger Smith confiscates the nuts. The squirrel's children then poke their heads from the door. Ranger Smith notices this and demands to see a marriage license. When the squirrel can't produce one Ranger Smith decides to write a ticket but to "let him off easy" this time. He demands that the squirrel store pickles for the winter and may only keep one child. The scene then changes to Yogi Bear and Boo Boo Bear's cave. The two bears are showering while Ranger Smith checks them; the duo are let off for not causing any chaos. At night, Ranger Smith decides to feed the owls, only to be beaten up by a rabbit and skunk resembling Ren and Stimpy, which scares away the owls. He then proceeds to go back to his cabin. He gets back in bed once again complaining about his job and life.

== Voice cast ==
- Corey Burton – Ranger John Smith
- Greg Burson – Yogi Bear, Squirrel Girl
- John Kricfalusi – Boo-Boo Bear, Squirrel Boy
- Kevin Kolde – Squirrel
- Mary Ellen Thomas – Squirrel Baby

== Production ==
Director John Kricfalusi was a fan of Hanna-Barbera series, including The Yogi Bear Show, in his youth. He worked at the studio in the 1980s and ultimately left out of dislike their outdated production methods. He later founded Spümcø and created The Ren & Stimpy Show for Nickelodeon, propelling the network from obscurity to a formidable rival of Hanna-Barbera alongside other Nicktoons. After his controversial firing from the series by Nickelodeon in 1992, Kricfalusi became well acquainted with Fred Seibert, assisting him by consulting on the development of Cartoon Network.

Both specials were greenlit sometime in 1997 as part of the network's Cartoon Cartoons initiative, after Kricfalusi settled a $100 million lawsuit against Nickelodeon for royalties after The Ren & Stimpy Show's cancellation. Vincent Waller provided story sketches while Ed Benedict of Hanna-Barbera, who designed Yogi Bear in his prime and was admired by Kricfalusi, served as a layout artist. Rough Draft Studios in Seoul provided animation services, finishing both specials in two years due to grueling retakes, with the studio unwilling to complete Boo Boo Runs Wild due to Kricfalusi's strict demands; all remaining animation was handled at Spümcø. Matt Danner worked on the specials as a clean-up animator, inker and production assistant while in high school. The specials eventually aired on Cartoon Network on September 24, 1999 with minimal Cartoon Cartoons branding, though still airing at the block's time slot.

== See also ==
- Boo Boo Runs Wild
- Ranger Smith
- Spümcø
