= Boo Boo Runs Wild =

1999 animated television special

- Genre: Parody; Black comedy Gross-out humor Comedy-drama; Surreal comedy
- Based on: The Yogi Bear Show by William Hanna and Joseph Barbera
- Developed by: John Kricfalusi
- Story by: John Kricfalusi
- Directed by: John Kricfalusi
- Voices of: Corey Burton; John Kricfalusi; Michael Pataki; Mary Ellen Thomas; Stephen Worth
- Composer: Henry Porch
- Country of origin: United States
- Original language: English

Production
- Executive producer: Kevin Kolde
- Producers: John Kricfalusi; Miles Horst; Stephen Worth
- Running time: approx. 21 min
- Production companies: Spümcø; Cartoon Network Studios

Original release
- Network: Cartoon Network
- Release: September 24, 1999

Related
- A Day in the Life of Ranger Smith

Boo Boo Runs Wild is a 1999 animated television special directed by The Ren & Stimpy Show creator John Kricfalusi and produced by Spümcø for Cartoon Network. It is a parody of the Hanna-Barbera series The Yogi Bear Show, revolving around Ranger Smith. It originally aired on Cartoon Network on September 24, 1999, along with A Day in the Life of Ranger Smith, a similar Yogi Bear-themed stand-alone special as part of The Cartoon Cartoons Show.

Despite Boo Boo being the arguable star of this short, it is title-carded as "A Ranger Smith Cartoon". The short is jokingly dedicated to layout artist Ed Benedict, the original designer for The Yogi Bear Show and other Hanna-Barbera properties of the 1950s–1960s, despite him being alive throughout its production.

Since its original debut in 1999, Boo Boo Runs Wild has aired multiple times on Cartoon Network's late-night programming block, Adult Swim. Despite airing on Adult Swim, it retained its original TV-Y7 rating until 2016, when it was rerated to TV-PG. From January 2006 until April 2006, Boo Boo Runs Wild aired every Sunday on Adult Swim. Promos for these Sunday reruns would treat the program as if it was an actual series, previewing the "next episode" yet also calling it the "premiere episode" later on in the promo. On April 1, 2006, following the normal Neon Genesis Evangelion bump, Adult Swim aired Boo Boo Runs Wild as an April Fool's Day joke, despite all TV listings showing Evangelion in its normal time slot. Adult Swim re-aired Boo Boo Runs Wild on Halloween night, October 31, 2008, as part of an advertised "Halloween Stunt" night, where obscure or randomly seen shows preempted the usual programming for that Friday night. In 2011, Adult Swim re-aired Boo Boo Runs Wild every night from January 10 until January 14, as part of their "DVR Theatre". It aired again on the nights of August 12, 2016, September 5, 2017 (as a part of a "History of Adult Swim" programming event, despite not being made for the block in mind), and January 6, 2019.

== Plot ==
Ranger Smith has gone on a rulemaking spree, posting arbitrary and nonsensical rules across all of Jellystone Park, including to the backside of a familiar-sounding moose, to his own glee. While Yogi Bear takes the new regulations with irritated annoyance, Boo Boo, usually the composed and sane one of the duo, feels increasingly repressed; and eventually, after a Ren Höek-esque rant, he loses his grip on sanity and goes feral, to Ranger Smith's dismay; as he always expected Yogi to be the one who rebelled.

Boo Boo's actions slowly escalate from feeding stolen human food to other bears to clawing the backsides off trees and then savagely devouring honey from a hive. Cindy Bear, aroused by Boo Boo's new attitude, joins him in an affair to Yogi's shock and dismay. Yogi goes to Ranger Smith's cabin to talk about Boo Boo. The Chief, furious over Boo Boo's actions (deeming them as "setting a terrible example for the other bears in the park"), orders Ranger Smith to put Boo Boo down over phone. Ranger Smith grabs a shotgun to kill Boo Boo, but Yogi refuses to allow out of loyalty to Boo Boo and he and Ranger Smith start a fight. Boo Boo reacts to Yogi and Ranger Smith's fight, he tries to intervene but is knocked out; this, along with Ranger Smith throwing water on him, returns him to normal; much to everyone's delight.

== Voice cast ==
- John Kricfalusi as Boo Boo Bear and Tree
- Stephen Worth as Yogi Bear
- Corey Burton as Ranger John Smith and Moose (cameo)
- Mary Ellen Thomas as Cindy Bear
- Michael Pataki as The Chief

== Production ==
Director John Kricfalusi was a fan of Hanna-Barbera series, including The Yogi Bear Show, in his youth. He worked at the studio in the 1980s and ultimately left out of dislike their outdated production methods. He later founded Spümcø and created The Ren & Stimpy Show for Nickelodeon, propelling the network from obscurity to a formidable rival of Hanna-Barbera alongside other Nicktoons. After his controversial firing from the series by Nickelodeon in 1992, Kricfalusi became well acquainted with Fred Seibert, assisting him by consulting on the development of Cartoon Network.

Both specials were greenlit sometime in 1997 as part of the network's Cartoon Cartoons initiative, after Kricfalusi settled a $100 million lawsuit against Nickelodeon for royalties after The Ren & Stimpy Show's cancellation. Vincent Waller provided story sketches while Ed Benedict of Hanna-Barbera, who designed Yogi Bear in his prime and was admired by Kricfalusi, served as a layout artist. Production progressed at a sluggish pace, with Benedict's work being constantly revised. Rough Draft Studios in Seoul provided animation services, finishing both specials in two years due to grueling retakes, with the studio unwilling to complete Boo Boo Runs Wild due to Kricfalusi's strict demands; all remaining animation was handled at Spümcø. Matt Danner worked on the specials as a clean-up animator, inker and production assistant while in high school. The specials eventually aired on Cartoon Network on September 24, 1999 with minimal Cartoon Cartoons branding, though still airing at the block's time slot.

== See also ==
- A Day in the Life of Ranger Smith
- Boo-Boo Bear
- Spümcø
