= Cindy Bear =

Fictional cartoon character

- The Yogi Bear Show character
- First appearance: "Acrobatty Bear" (1961)
- Created by: William Hanna; Joseph Barbera
- Voiced by: Julie Bennett (1961–1988); Cecil Roy (Casanova Yogi Bear and Cutie Cindy Bear, Songs of the Cave Set (1960), Songs of Yogi Bear and his Pals LP (1961), A Hap-Hap-Happy Christmas from Yogi Bear (1961), Hey There, It's Yogi Bear! LP (1964)); Dottie Evans (How to Be a Better-Than-the Average Child Without Really Trying! (1962)); Jackie Ward (singing voice in Hey There, It's Yogi Bear!); Chuck McCann (Wake Up, America! LP, 1965); Janet Waldo (Yogi's First Christmas); Linda Harmon (singing voice in Yogi Bear and the Invasion of the Space Bears); Kath Soucie (Yo Yogi!); Mary Ellen Thomas ("Boo Boo Runs Wild"); Grace Helbig (Jellystone!, 2021–2025)

In-universe information
- Species: Brown bear
- Gender: Female
- Family: Mr. Bear (father); Mrs. Bear (mother)
- Significant other: Yogi Bear (boyfriend)
- Relatives: Boo-Boo Bear (friend); Ranger Smith (friend)

Cindy Bear is a fictional character created by Hanna-Barbera. She is one of the primary supporting characters of the Yogi Bear franchise as well as a regular in the stable of frequently appearing Hanna-Barbera animated personalities. Cindy was originally portrayed by voice actress Julie Bennett, who reprised the part for most of the character's appearances from the 1960s through the 1980s.

== Personality ==
Cindy Bear is the love interest of Yogi Bear and a resident of Jellystone Park. She speaks with a pronounced Southern accent, and she carries a parasol. Cindy rarely engages in the same antics as Yogi and Boo-Boo and does not share the same antagonistic relationship with Ranger Smith. Her romance with Yogi Bear is typically portrayed as on-again/off-again, with her pursuing him while he avoids and evades her advances. Just as often, however, Yogi is shown to return her affections.

== Development ==
Cindy Bear was originally designed by Ed Benedict. One early sketch saw her clad in a bonnet, a frilly scarf and an apron with an elongated, pointed muzzle. A second sketch dropped all accessories save the frill scarf and shortened her muzzle.

Cindy made her debut in the 1961 television series The Yogi Bear Show as a semi-recurring character. Her finalized animation design featured blue/grey fur, a hat, a white frill scarf and a necklace.

Cindy appeared prominently in the 1964 feature film Hey There, It's Yogi Bear in which she is kidnapped, spurring Yogi and Boo-Boo to come to her rescue. She was redesigned by art director Iwao Takamoto for the film into the more familiar modern version with taupe fur, a flower, a light blue skirt and a yellow handkerchief like scarf.

Cindy has received a few slightly different, one-off redesigns. In Yogi's First Christmas, she was given dark brown fur and white hair, as well as a number of different outfits which she wore throughout the film. For the Spümcø short "Boo Boo Runs Wild", she retained her modern character design, but with the blue/grey fur of her original design. Yo Yogi! featured a preteen Cindy Bear with a significant redesign, wearing a modern 1990s outfit consisting of a white skirt/top, purple jacket, purple shorts, white boots and a ponytail.

Cindy Bear appears in Jellystone! as a medical doctor. In this version, Cindy is a brilliant doctor and scientist. But she is also an egomaniac capable of turning on her friends to get her way.

== Animated media ==
=== Television shows ===
- 1961 - The Yogi Bear Show (segments "Acrobatty Bear", "A Wooin' Bruin" and "Yogi's Birthday Party")
- 1973 - Yogi's Gang (episodes "Gossipy Witch" and "Mr. Hothead")
- 1977 - Laff-A-Lympics
- 1985 - Yogi's Treasure Hunt (episodes "To Bee or Not to Bee", "Yogi and the Beanstalk" and "Secret Agent Bear")
- 1988 - The New Yogi Bear Show
- 1990 - Wake, Rattle, and Roll
- 1991 - Yo Yogi!
- 1999 - Boo Boo Runs Wild
- 2002 - What's New, Scooby-Doo? (episode "Roller Ghoster Ride") (cameo as toy)
- 2004 - Harvey Birdman, Attorney at Law (episode "Droopy Botox")
- 2021 - Jellystone!

=== Films and specials ===
- 1964 - Hey There, It's Yogi Bear (singing voice by Jackie Ward)
- 1980 - Yogi's First Christmas
- 1988 - Yogi and the Invasion of the Space Bears (singing voice by Linda Harmon)
- 1989 - Hanna-Barbera's 50th: A Yabba Dabba Doo Celebration
- 2013 - Scooby-Doo! Mask of the Blue Falcon (cameo as picture)

== Comics ==
While only a recurring character in the animated shorts, Cindy Bear featured prominently in the various Yogi Bear and other Hanna-Barbera comics published by Dell Comics, Charlton Comics and Marvel Comics.

Cindy made her debut in Dell's Yogi Bear #5, detailing her backstory. It is revealed that Ranger Smith had her transferred to Jellystone from Red Oak National Park in a scheme to hamper Yogi's mischief by distracting him with Cindy's persistent wooing. The plot eventually backfires when Yogi succumbs to Cindy's advances and begins stealing twice as many picnic baskets to feed her.

She would also appear frequently in the Charlton Comics series, drawn in both her early design and her revised design.

Cindy also appeared as a participant in Marvel's Laff-A-Lympics comic series. In Laff-A-Lympics #5, she helps uncover a false identity scheme by the Really Rottens. In Laff-A-Lympics #13, she was revealed to be the team's chef during the offseason....at least until the eating habits of Grape Ape drove her to quit.

== Licensing ==
- Cindy Bear can be regularly encountered as a costumed meet-and-greet character at a chain of recreational vehicle and camping parks ("Yogi Bear's Jellystone Park Camp Resorts"). The first of these parks opened in 1969 in Sturgeon Bay, Wisconsin. As of 2011, over 70 locations have hosted the parks.
