= Yogi Bear's Honey Fried Chicken =

Former American fast food restaurant chain

Coordinates: 34.3691°N 80.0708°W

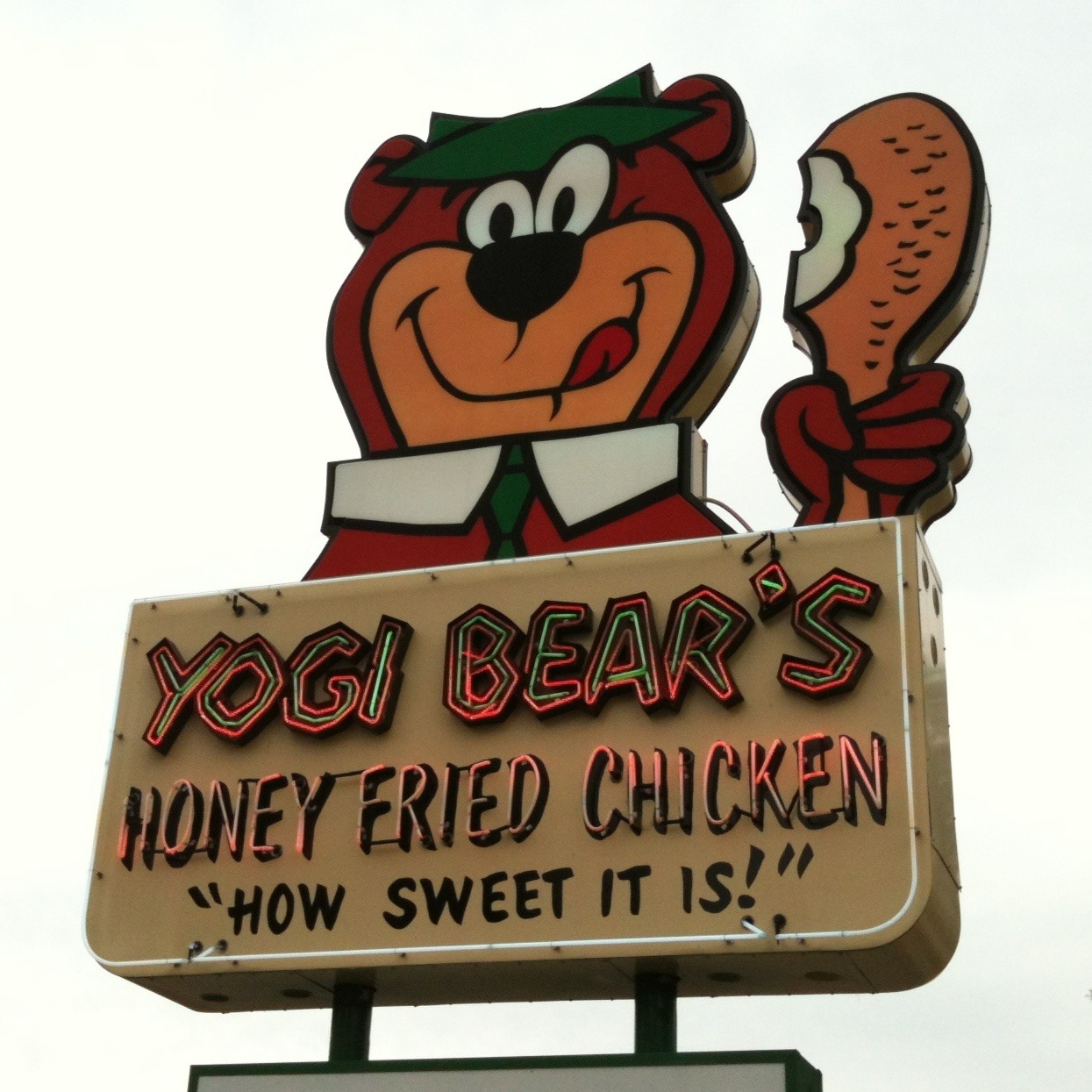
- Yogi Bear's Honey Fried Chicken Road Sign
- Company type: Private
- Industry: Fast Food
- Founded: 1968; 58 years ago
- Founder: Eugene Broome
- Defunct: Late-1970’s
- Fate: Shut Down
- Headquarters: United States
- Number of locations: 1
- Area served: South Carolina
- Website: yogifriedchicken.com

Yogi Bear's Honey Fried Chicken is an American fast food restaurant, formerly a restaurant chain, developed in 1968 and operating multiple locations into the 1970s. The chain sought to capitalize on the popularity of the cartoon character Yogi Bear, and the growing market for fast food fried chicken spawned by the success of Kentucky Fried Chicken.

== Origin and development ==
In the late 1960s, South Carolina restaurant entrepreneur Eugene Broome developed a honey-flavored chicken tenderizer, which became locally popular, leading Broome to open several restaurants. Broome initially wanted to name the restaurant after actor Jackie Gleason, with the intent of competing with Minnie Pearl's Fried Chicken, but Gleason declined the offer. Nonetheless, when the theme was changed, Broome retained as a motto one of Gleason's catchphrases from the TV series The Honeymooners, "How sweet it is!" After Gleason's rejection, Broome happened to see Yogi Bear on television, and contacted Hanna Barbera merchandising supervisor Ed Justin, who was willing to license the character, which led to the branding of the chain as Yogi Bear's Honey Fried Chicken. Coincidentally, the character of Yogi Bear was said to have been inspired by the character of Gleeson's costar on The Honeymooners, Art Carney's Ed Norton.

In January 1968, the Hardee's restaurant company paid $1 million to form a partnership with Broome for the licensing and operation of the chain. Despite having purchased the chain, "the branded stores were largely neglected" by Hardee's. By 1971, one magazine noted that "[w]hile hamburgers go fast, the company has had less success with a fried chicken entry. In fact, the Yogi Bear Honey Fried Chicken outlets (there are eleven now in the Southeast and Midwest) have been a bomb since the start in early 1968". The following year, another magazine described the effort as a "snafu" on Hardee's part, noting that "[t]he venture was wrong on two counts: the Yogi Bear image appeals to children but fried chicken is an adult item".

== Decline and aftermath ==
As of 1972, the company reported that "[p]lans are being made to change the Yogi Bear operations and in the interim there is no expansion of outlets". However, "[l]ike so many of the franchised cartoon restaurant chains, Yogi Bear's Honey Fried Chicken had flown the coop by the early 1970s, leaving abandoned buildings in its wake". The second-to-last location closed in the late 1970s.

As the restaurants closed, a number of large fiberglass statues of Yogi Bear and other franchise characters that had been made for the restaurants were bought by the operator of a "Jellystone Park"-themed campground in North Carolina, and were later dumped on vacant land near Interstate 95 near Halifax, North Carolina, more-so known as "The Yogi Bear Graveyard". The statue graveyard became an unintentional tourist attraction, until it was razed in 2008 for new construction at the site. As of 2026, a single Yogi Bear's Honey Fried Chicken venue remained in operation, in Hartsville, South Carolina.
