= Julie Bennett =

American actress (1932–2020)

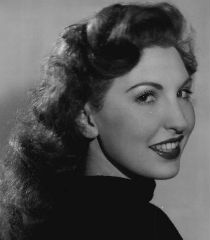
- Born: January 24, 1932; Manhattan, New York, U.S.
- Died: March 31, 2020 (aged 88); Los Angeles, California, U.S.
- Occupation: Actress
- Years active: 1947–2000
- Known for: The Yogi Bear Show

Julie Bennett (January 24, 1932 – March 31, 2020) was an American actress.

== Early years ==
Bennett was born in Manhattan, New York, on January 24, 1932. By the time she was 18, she had been living in Hollywood, Los Angeles for so long that she was described as a "native of Hollywood", when she returned to New York to pursue her acting career.

== Career ==
Bennett worked as a character actress on stage, on radio, and in several film and television programs, including The George Burns and Gracie Allen Show, Adventures of Superman, and Dragnet.

=== Voice acting ===
Bennett worked as a voice actress from the 1950s until the early 2000s. She recorded voices for UPA, Warner Bros., Metro-Goldwyn-Mayer, Format Films' The Rocky and Bullwinkle Show (in 1959, for three of season 1 editions of the segment "Fractured Fairy Tales"), and Hanna-Barbera Productions.

She is best known as the voice of Hanna-Barbera's Cindy Bear on The Yogi Bear Show and its feature-film spin-off Hey There, It's Yogi Bear! She reprised the character in Yogi's Treasure Hunt, Yogi and the Invasion of the Space Bears, and The New Yogi Bear Show.

Bennett continued with voice work into the 1990s, including a role as the voice of Aunt May Parker in the animated TV series Spider-Man after Linda Gary's death in 1995.

=== Other activities ===
Apart from her acting career, Bennett worked as a realtor and an agent for other actors. She went by a pseudonym when working in a field other than performing.

== Death ==
Bennett died of complications from COVID-19 at Cedars-Sinai Medical Center on March 31, 2020, aged 88, during the COVID-19 pandemic in California.

== Filmography ==
=== Film ===
Year	Title	Role	Notes
1955	Illegal	Ms. Worth	Uncredited
1956	Busy Buddies	Jeannie, Joan, Baby (voice)	Uncredited
1957	Tom's Photo Finish	Joan (voice)	Uncredited
1958	Droopy Leprechaun	Airline Hostness (voice)	Uncredited
1958	Tot Watchers	Jeannie, Joan (voice)	Uncredited
1961	Strangled Eggs	Miss Prissy (voice)	Uncredited
1962	Loopy De Loop	Female Skunk (voice)	Common Scents theatrical short
1962	The Slick Chick	Widow Hen (voice)	
1962	Louvre Come Back to Me!	Mona Lisa, Penelope Pussycat (voice)	
1962	Gay Purr-ee	Marie (voice)	
1963	I Was a Teenage Thumb	Prunhilda (voice)	
1963	The Unmentionables	Phone Operator (voice)	
1963	Transylvania 6-5000	Agatha and Emily (voice)	
1964	Hey There, It's Yogi Bear!	Cindy Bear (voice)	
1966	What's Up, Tiger Lily?	Vocal Assist (voice)	
1967	King Kong Escapes	Lt. Susan Watson, Madame Piranha (voice)	English version only
1970	Sole Survivor	Amanda (uncredited)	
1972	Tijuana Toads	Flora (voice)	Frog Jog theatrical short
1986	Crossings	1st Lady	
1988	Yogi and the Invasion of the Space Bears	Cindy Bear (voice)	
1988	Daffy Duck's Quackbusters	Agatha and Emily (voice)	

=== Television ===
Year	Title	Role	Notes
1949–1952	The Clock		
1946–1952	Lights Out		
1950–1951	Starlight Theatre		
1950–1956	Big Town		
1952–1953	Steve Randall	Audrey Clayton	
1953	The George Burns and Gracie Allen Show	Mimi Watson	
1953–1955	Lux Video Theatre	Edith / Miss Williams	
1954	I Led 3 Lives	Comrade Munson	
1954	The Ford Television Theatre	Receptionist	
1954	Public Defender	Jane Stevens	
1955	The Farmer from Monticello	Martha Jefferson	
1955	The Eddie Cantor Comedy Theater		
1955–1957	Matinee Theatre		
1956	Adventures of Superman	Sometimes Mabel	
1956–1959	Dragnet	Jan Petrie	
1957	Leave It to Beaver	Waitress	
1957	Highway Patrol	Mrs. Wright	
1959	The Further Adventures of Ellery Queen		
1959–1960	The Quick Draw McGraw Show	Sagebrush Sal, Gisele (voice)	2 episodes
1960–1962	The Bullwinkle Show	Fisherman's Wife, Little Princess, Princess Irene (voice)	Segment Fractured Fairy Tales
1960–1961	The Huckleberry Hound Show	Brigette, Juliet (voice)	2 episodes
1960	The Bugs Bunny Show	Additional voices	
1960	Mister Magoo	Daughter (voice)	Episode: "Magoo's Western Exposure"
1961	The Best of the Post	Rosalie Blagden	
1961–1962	The Yogi Bear Show	Cindy Bear (voice)	3 episodes
1962	The Donna Reed Show	Lady Customer	
1963	McHale's Navy	Nippon Nancy (voice)	
1964	The Magilla Gorilla Show	Various Characters (voice)	
1965	The Famous Adventures of Mr. Magoo	Snow White, Lady of the Lake (voice)	
1965–1967	The Beatles	Female Characters (voice)	
1967–1968	The Superman/Aquaman Hour of Adventure	Donna Troy / Wonder Girl (voice)	Segment Teen Titans
1967–1969	The New Adventures of Superman	Lois Lane (voice)	
1967–1970	Get Smart	Zachary, Stewardess	
1968	The Bugs Bunny/Road Runner Hour	Various Characters (voice)	
1968	The New Adventures of Huckleberry Finn	Princess Tina (voice)	Episode: "The Little People"
1968	The Banana Splits Adventure Hour	Queen Anne, Lady Constance (voice)	Segment The Three Musketeers
1969	Cattanooga Cats	Kitty Jo, Chessie (voice)	
1969	The F.B.I.	Katie Singer	
1969–1970	Dragnet 1967	Susan Fowler, Evelyn Gentry, Jan Petrie, Angela Tigley	
1970	Love, American Style	Carol	Segment Love and the V.I.P. Restaurant
1970	The Bold Ones: The New Doctors	Eve Parker	
1971	The Funky Phantom	Lori Elwood	"The Headless Horseman"
1971	The Bob Hope Special	Herself	
1973	Jeannie	Various Characters (voice)	
1973	Yogi's Gang	Cindy Bear (voice)	2 episodes
1974	Gunsmoke	Kate	
1974	These Are the Days	Various Characters (voice)	
1974–1975	Adam-12	Angie Byrd, Ethel Pollard (voice)	
1977–1978	Scooby's All Star Laff-A-Lympics	Cindy Bear (voice)	
1977	Captain Caveman and the Teen Angels	Various Characters (voice)	
1977	Fred Flintstone and Friends	Various Characters (voice)	
1978	The All-New Popeye Hour	Additional voices	
1978	Dinky Dog	Monica (voice)	
1979	Gulliver's Travels	Various Characters (voice)	
1981	Goliath Awaits	Sylvia King	
1984	The Mighty Orbots	Boo (voice)	
1986	The Bugs Bunny and Tweety Show	Agatha and Emily (voice)	
1986	Yogi's Treasure Hunt	Cindy Bear, United Nations Speaker (voice)	
1986	The Real Ghostbusters	Cynthia Crawford (voice)	
1988	The New Yogi Bear Show	Cindy Bear (voice)	
1989	Moonlighting	Woman	
1990	Square One TV	Sybil Divine	
1990	Thanksgiving Day	Julie	
1990	Mathnet	Sybil Divine	
1991	Garfield and Friends	Lola, various roles (voice)	
1995–1998	Spider-Man: The Animated Series	Aunt May Parker (voice)	Seasons 3–5, after the death of Linda Gary

=== Video games ===
Year	Title	Voice role	Notes
2000	Spider-Man	Old Woman	Final role

Preceded by None	Voice of Cindy Bear; 1961–1988	Succeeded by Janet Waldo
