= Yogi's Great Escape (video game) =

1990 video game

- Developer: PAL Developments
- Publisher: Hi-Tec Software
- Platforms: Amiga; Amstrad CPC; Atari ST; Commodore 64; Atari 8-bit; ZX Spectrum
- Release: EU: 1990
- Genre: Platform
- Mode: Single-player

Yogi's Great Escape is a platform game based on the 1987 movie of the same name. It was developed by British studio PAL Developments and published in 1990 by Hi-Tec Software as a budget game. It was released in Europe for Amiga, Amstrad CPC, Atari ST, Commodore 64, Atari 8-bit computers, and ZX Spectrum.

== Gameplay ==
Yogi's Great Escape is a side-scrolling platform game in which the player takes control of Yogi Bear. In the game, Yogi learns that Jellystone Park is set to close, and its animal inhabitants will be moved to a zoo. Yogi does not like the idea of living in a zoo, so he decides to escape to New York City. Gameplay takes place across six levels: Jellystone Park, a forest, a Wild West setting, a marsh, a fun fair, and New York City.

Various enemies must be avoided throughout the game, including hunters and snakes. The player also has a time limit on each level and must evade Ranger Smith, who will find Yogi if the timer runs out. If all lives are lost, the player must restart the game from the first level. Picnic baskets and toffee apples are located throughout the game, providing bonus points if they are collected. A higher number of bonus points can be earned by collecting cowboy hats, bags of money, and pieces of Yogi's car.

== Reception ==
Reception

Review scores
Publication	Score
Crash	79% (ZX Spectrum)
Computer and Video Games	83% (ZX Spectrum); 86% (Amiga)
Sinclair User	84% (ZX Spectrum)
Your Sinclair	42/100 (ZX Spectrum)
Zzap!64	77% (C64)
Amiga Joker	33% (Amiga)
Amstrad Computer User	80% (Amstrad CPC)
YC	85/100 (C64)

Yogi's Great Escape generally received praise for its graphics. Crash called the game fun and addictive, but noted that the monochrome colour scheme of the ZX Spectrum version made it difficult to see things such as snakes. Jim Douglas of Sinclair User praised the game's collision detection but stated that the gameplay was somewhat hampered by the fact that the player is sent back to the beginning of the game once all lives are lost. Zzap!64 found this aspect to be repetitive, but otherwise described the game as "very playable" for a budget release. Beverly Gardner of YC described the gameplay as fun and addictive, but also difficult. Gardner considered the game to be better than most other budget games. Douglas also stated that some aspects of the gameplay were tricky and difficult.

Amstrad Computer User praised the story and sound, while Douglas stated that the game had minimal sound consisting of "only some wonky bleeps and boops." Computer and Video Games, in its review of the ZX Spectrum version, described the gameplay as addictive and mentally stimulating. The magazine also praised the soundtrack and smooth scrolling of the Amiga version, and called it "an absolute steal at the price" of £6.99. Rich Pelley of Your Sinclair described the gameplay as "very simple, pretty uninspiring and extremely repetitive," further writing that the game "looks very dated and boring, even for £2.99."
