= Yogi Bear =

American animated television and film character

- The Yogi Bear Show character
- First appearance: "Yogi Bear's Big Break" (The Huckleberry Hound Show, 1958)
- Created by: William Hanna; Joseph Barbera
- Designed by: Ed Benedict; Kali Fontecchio (Jellystone!)
- Portrayed by: Dick DeBartolo (To Tell the Truth)
- Voiced by: List: Daws Butler (1958–1988) Gilbert Mack (Quick Draw McGraw and Huckleberry Hound LP (1959), Yogi Bear Introduces Loopy De Loop/Let's Have a Song, Yogi Bear! LP (1960)) Jack Mercer (Movie Wheels Present Huckleberry Hound and Yogi Bear (1960)) Sascha Burland (Howl Along with Huckleberry Hound (1960)) Frank Milano (Casanova Yogi Bear and Cutie Cindy Bear, Songs of the Cave Set (1960), Songs of Yogi Bear and his Pals LP (1961), A Hap-Hap-Happy Christmas from Yogi Bear (1961), How to Be a Better-Than-the Average Child Without Really Trying! (1962), Hey There, It's Yogi Bear! LP (1964)) James Darren (singing voice in Hey There, It's Yogi Bear!) Bill Lee (singing voice in Hey There, It's Yogi Bear) Allan Melvin (Yogi Bear and Boo Boo Tell Stories Of Little Red Riding Hood and Jack and the Beanstalk LP (1965)) Chuck McCann (Wake Up, America! LP (1965)) Rich Little (Canada's Wonderland live shows, Hanna-Barbera Land live shows, Hanna-Barbera Fun!, Looking for a Home, Ice Capades) Keith Scott (Pauls commercial, Hanna-Barbera Gala Celebrity Nite) Mel Blanc (1983; Macy's Thanksgiving Day Parade (animated segments)) Hal Smith (1984; Strong Kids, Safe Kids) Greg Burson (1988–2003) Jeff Bergman (1992–present) Billy West (1990s and 2000s Cartoon Network commercials, 2005 Boomerang promotion) Stephen Worth (Boo Boo Runs Wild, Boo Boo and the Man) Maurice LaMarche (Harvey Birdman, Attorney at Law) Erik Richter (Harvey Birdman, Attorney at Law) Dave Fouquette (The Grim Adventures of Billy & Mandy) Seth MacFarlane (Family Guy) Dan Milano (Robot Chicken) Scott Innes (At Picnic-Honey Lesson) Dan Aykroyd (film, Yogi Bear: The Video Game) Kevin Shinick (Mad) Lewis MacLeod (Müller commercial) Seth Green (Robot Chicken)

In-universe information
- Species: Brown bear
- Gender: Male
- Family: Unnamed grandparents; Unnamed parents; Unnamed brother
- Significant other: Cindy Bear (girlfriend)

Yogi Bear is an anthropomorphic animal character who has appeared in numerous comic books, animated television shows, and films. He made his debut in 1958 as a supporting character in The Huckleberry Hound Show.

He was created by Hanna-Barbera and was eventually more popular than ostensible star Huckleberry Hound. In January 1961, he was given his own show, The Yogi Bear Show, sponsored by Kellogg's, which included the segments Snagglepuss and Yakky Doodle. Hokey Wolf replaced his segment on The Huckleberry Hound Show. A musical animated feature film, Hey There, It's Yogi Bear, was released in 1964.

Yogi was one of the several Hanna-Barbera characters to have a collar. This allowed animators to keep his body relatively static, redrawing only his head in each frame when he spoke – one of the ways Hanna-Barbera cut costs, reducing the number of drawings needed for a seven-minute cartoon from around 14,000 to around 2,000.

== Personality ==
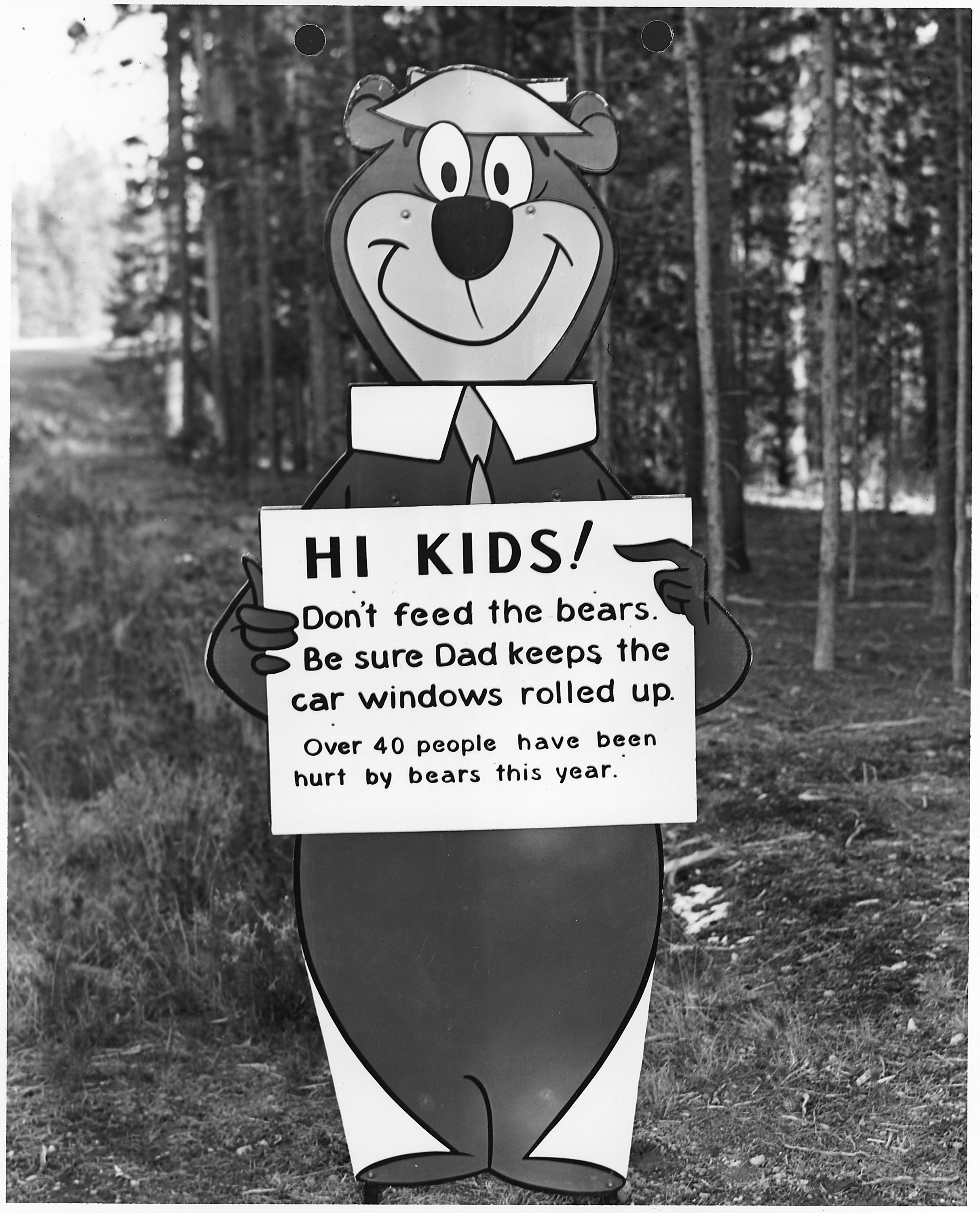
Yogi sign advising young National Park visitors not to feed the bears (1961)

Like many Hanna-Barbera characters, Yogi's personality and mannerisms were based on a popular celebrity of the time. Art Carney's Ed Norton character on The Honeymooners was said to be Yogi's inspiration; his voice mannerisms broadly mimic Carney as Norton. Carney, in turn, received influence from the Borscht Belt and comedians of vaudeville.

Yogi's name was similar to that of contemporary baseball star Yogi Berra, who was known for his amusing quotes, such as "half the lies they tell about me aren't true." Berra filed a defamation lawsuit against Hanna-Barbera, but the company argued that any resemblance was purely coincidental. Berra withdrew his suit, but the defense was considered implausible. At the time Yogi Bear first hit TV screens, Yogi Berra was a household name. Journalist Walter Brasch once wrote that "whether coincidence or not, it is difficult to find anyone else in the [animation] industry who believes it." Berra himself said, "I was going to sue the Yogi Bear program for using my name until somebody reminded me that Yogi isn't my real name. It's Lawrence."

The plot of most of Yogi's cartoons centered on his antics in the fictional Jellystone Park, a variant of the real Yellowstone National Park. Yogi, accompanied by his constant companion Boo-Boo Bear, would often try to steal picnic baskets from campers in the park, much to the displeasure of Park Ranger Smith. Yogi's girlfriend, Cindy Bear, sometimes appeared and usually disapproved of Yogi's antics.

== Catchphrases ==
Besides often speaking in rhyme, Yogi Bear had a number of catchphrases, including his famous chant of excitement and greeting ("Hey, hey, hey"), his pet name for picnic baskets ("pic-a-nic baskets"), and his favorite self-promotion ("I'm smarter than the av-er-age bear!"), although he often overestimates his own cleverness. Another characteristic of Yogi was his deep and silly voice. He often greets the ranger with a cordial, "Hello, Mr. Ranger, sir!" and uses "Hey there, Boo Boo!" as his preferred greeting to his sidekick, Boo Boo. Yogi would also often use puns in his speech and had a habit of pronouncing large words with a long vocal flourish.

== Voice actors ==
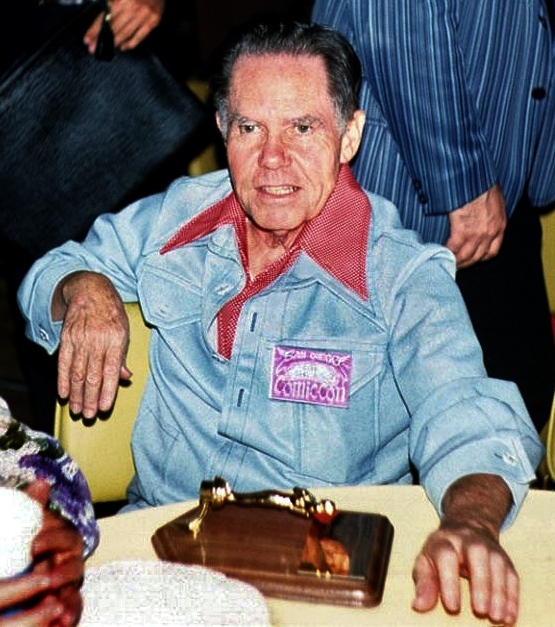
Daws Butler originated the character's voice.

From the time of the character's debut until 1988, Yogi was voiced by Daws Butler. Butler died in 1988; his last performance as Yogi was in the television film Yogi and the Invasion of the Space Bears.

In 1983, a Yogi Bear balloon made its first appearance in the Macy's Thanksgiving Day Parade, becoming the final balloon that year. That same year, he appeared on a float named A Hanna-Barbera Christmas alongside many other Hanna-Barbera characters, as they cleaned up the streets of Broadway. The performance was bookended with animated segments featuring Yogi and Boo-Boo, voiced by Mel Blanc and Butler, respectively.

After Butler's death in 1988, Greg Burson stepped in to perform the role; Butler had taught Burson personally how to voice Yogi as well as his other characters. Worsening alcoholism and a legal incident led to Burson's firing in 2004 and eventually his death in 2008.

Yogi's current voice actor is Jeff Bergman. Bergman and Billy West also performed the character throughout the 1990s and early to mid-2000s for various Cartoon Network and Boomerang commercials and bumpers.

Australian voice actor, animation historian and impressionist Keith Scott provided Yogi's voice in a Pauls commercial and the live show Hanna-Barbera Gala Celebrity Night at the Wonderland Sydney amusement park in Australia, where Yogi and other Hanna-Barbera characters including Huckleberry Hound, Scooby-Doo, George Jetson, Fred Flintstone, Barney Rubble, Wilma Flintstone, and Betty Rubble make guest appearances.

In the 2010 Yogi Bear film, the character is voiced by Dan Aykroyd.

In a Müller commercial in 2011 titled "Wünderful Stuff", Lewis MacLeod performed the voice of Yogi.

In the animated stop motion sketch comedy show Robot Chicken, Dan Milano and Seth Green (creator of the show) voiced Yogi Bear.

Scott Innes performed the voice of Yogi, along with Boo-Boo, in At Picnic, Forest, and Honey Lesson.

== Media ==
=== Television series ===
Series number	Title	Broadcast run	Original channel	Total # episodes	Total # seasons
1	The Huckleberry Hound Show	1958–1960	Syndication	35 episodes	2
2	The Yogi Bear Show	1961–1962	Syndication	33 episodes	2
3	Yogi's Gang	1973–1975	ABC	15 episodes	1
4	Yogi's Space Race (Note: This show had Yogi Bear paired up with Scare Bear opposite of Huckleberry Hound being paired up with Quack-Up the Duck.)	1978–1979	NBC	13 episodes	1
5	Galaxy Goof-Ups (Note: This show had Yogi Bear, Huckleberry Hound, Scare Bear, and Quack-Up working as bumbling intergalactic police officers.)	1978–1979	NBC	13 episodes	1
6	Yogi's Treasure Hunt	1985–1988	Syndication	27 episodes	3
7	The New Yogi Bear Show (Note: A half-hour weekday animated series which aired in first-run syndication.)	1988–1989	Syndication	45 episodes	1
8	Yo Yogi!	1991	NBC	13 episodes	1
9	Jellystone!	2021–2025	Max (Note: Originally called HBO Max in season 1 and 2 before the name changed in 2023.)	77 episodes	3

==== Other appearances ====
- Top Cat (1961), Yogi along with Huck appear in front pages of comics books in "King for a Day".
- The Flintstones (1963), Yogi and Boo-Boo steal Fred and Wilma Flintstone's "pic-a-nic basket" in "The Swedish Visitors".
- The New Scooby-Doo Movies (1972), guest cameo on the giant balloon in "The Caped Crusader Caper".
- Laff-A-Lympics (1977–1978), this show had Yogi Bear as captain of the Yogi Yahooeys team, with Boo-Boo and Cindy also part of the team.
- Yogi Bear and Boo-Boo made guest appearances at 3 ShowBiz Pizza Place restaurants in 1987, voiced by Daws Butler and Don Messick, although no known footage exists.
- Yogi was originally slated to make a cameo in the 1988 film Who Framed Roger Rabbit.
- Wake, Rattle, and Roll (1990–1991), he and Boo-Boo appear in the Fender Bender 500 segment.
- A Pup Named Scooby-Doo, guest cameo in "The Story Stick".
- Tom & Jerry Kids, guest cameo on television in "Tyke on a Hike".
- Family Guy (1999), a random spoofed version of Yogi and Boo-Boo's appearance is seen in Season 5, Episode 3, but Peter Griffin brutally kills him using a hunting knife as a favor to the Park Ranger, before telling Boo-Boo to "Tell the other bears what you just saw".
- The Grim Adventures of Billy & Mandy (2003–2008), Yogi and Boo-Boo have a guest appearance in Season 2, Episode 7. And also, they made brief cameos in Season 4, Episode 3.
- Scooby-Doo! Mystery Incorporated, a crazed feral bear resembling Yogi Bear appears near the end of "Howl of the Fright Hound".
- Appearing in the form of short cameos in Space Jam: A New Legacy, Yogi and Boo-Boo can be seen with other Warner Bros. owned characters beside them watching the basketball game between the Tune Squad and the Goon Squad.
- Yogi appears with Boo-Boo in the Robot Chicken episode "Ban on the Fun", voiced by Dan Milano. In a segment that parodies Laff-A-Lympics in the style of the Munich massacre, the Really Rottens shoot the Yogi Yahooeys to death as retribution to losing to them so many times. Yogi later appeared in a movie trailer segment that parodies the Rambo franchise from the episode "President Evil", voiced by Milano once again. He was later featured in the sketch "Power Forest Rangers" of the show's 100th episode "Fight Club Paradise", voiced by series creator Seth Green.
- On February 27, 2018, Yogi appeared in an ad for Rocket Mortgage along with Boo Boo and Ranger Smith.
- Yogi and Boo-Boo, along with other Hanna-Barbera and Looney Tunes characters make cameo appearances in the "Suffragette City" song on the Animaniacs revival. They were previously parodied in the original show as "Calhoun Capybara and Lew-Lew" as the Warner siblings were loaned out to appear in their cartoon.
- On May 10, 2021, Yogi and Boo-Boo appeared in a commercial advertisement for GEICO raiding a family cookout in "bear country".
- Teen Titans Go! (2013), Yogi appeared in the episode, "Warner Bros. 100th Anniversary" as a supporting character.

=== Animated films and specials ===
- Hey There, It's Yogi Bear, a 1964 animated feature released by Warner Bros. Pictures and Columbia Pictures
- Yogi's Ark Lark, a 1972 made-for-TV movie for The ABC Saturday Superstar Movie
- Hanna-Barbera's All-Star Comedy Ice Revue, a 1978 TV special honoring Fred Flintstone on his 48th birthday
- Casper's First Christmas, a 1979 TV special featuring the characters from Casper and the Angels meeting Yogi and his gang
- Yogi's First Christmas, a 1980 made-for-TV movie for syndication
- Yogi Bear's All Star Comedy Christmas Caper, a 1982 TV special starring Yogi and friends
- Yogi's Great Escape, a 1987 made-for-TV movie for syndication
- Yogi Bear and the Magical Flight of the Spruce Goose, a 1987 made-for-TV movie for syndication
- Yogi and the Invasion of the Space Bears, a 1988 made-for-TV movie for syndication
- The Good, the Bad, and Huckleberry Hound, a 1988 made-for-TV movie for syndication
- Hanna-Barbera's 50th: A Yabba Dabba Doo Celebration, a 1989 musical TV film
- Yogi the Easter Bear, a 1994 TV special for first-run syndication
- Arabian Nights, a 1994 TV special for TBS (Aladdin segment)
- Scooby-Doo! Mask of the Blue Falcon, 2013 direct-to-DVD (cameo as picture)
- Space Jam: A New Legacy, a 2021 animated feature released by Warner Bros. Pictures (cameo)

=== Educational films ===
- Hanna-Barbera Educational Filmstrips
  - Yogi Bear: Play it Safe (1979)
  - Yogi Bear Visits His Medical Friends (1980)
- Learning Tree Filmstrip Set
  - Learning About Citizenship with Yogi Bear (1982)
  - Learning About Groups and Rules with Yogi Bear (1982)
- Earthquake Preparedness (1984)
- D.A.R.E. Bear Yogi (1989)

=== Video games ===
- Yogi's Frustration (Intellivision), 1983
- Yogi Bear (Amstrad CPC, C64, ZX Spectrum) (1987)
- Yogi Bear & Friends in The Greed Monster (C64), 1990
- Yogi Bear's Math Adventures (MS-DOS), 1990
- Yogi's Great Escape (Amiga, Amstrad CPC, Atari ST, Atari 8-bit, C64, ZX Spectrum), 1990
- Yo Yogi Bear (Tiger handheld), 1991
- Yogi's Big Clean Up (Amiga), 1992
- Adventures of Yogi Bear / Yogi Bear's Cartoon Capers (Super NES, Genesis), 1994
- Yogi Bear's Gold Rush (Game Boy), 1994
- Yogi Bear: Great Balloon Blast (Game Boy Color), 2000
- Yogi Bear: The Video Game (Wii, Nintendo DS), 2010

=== Albums ===
- Howl Along with Huckleberry Hound and Yogi Bear (1960)
- Huckleberry Hound for President (1960)
- Hanna-Barbera's Yogi Bear and His Pals (1961)
- Hey There, It's Yogi Bear, a 1964 music from the original motion picture soundtrack
- Songs from Hey There, It's Yogi Bear
- Yogi Bear and Boo-Bop Tell the Stories of Little Red Riding Hood and Jack and The Beanstalk (1965)
- Yogi Bear and the Three Stooges Meet the Mad, Mad, Mad Dr. No-No, a 1966 comedy album
- Yogi Bear, a 2010 score soundtrack by John Debney

=== Live action/animated feature film ===
A live-action/animated film titled Yogi Bear was released by Warner Bros. Pictures in December 2010. The movie featured Dan Aykroyd as the voice of Yogi Bear. The film, adapting the television series, follows the adventures of Yogi Bear and his pal Boo-Boo in Jellystone Park, as they team up with Ranger Smith to save Jellystone Park from being shut down and logged.

=== Songs ===
"Yogi" by The Ivy Three (1960), sung in a voice mimicking Yogi Bear. The song reached no. 8 on the Billboard Hot 100.

=== Spümcø Ranger Smith and Boo Boo shorts ===
In 1999, animator John Kricfalusi's Spümcø company created and directed two Yogi cartoons, A Day in the Life of Ranger Smith and Boo Boo Runs Wild. Both shorts aired that year on the Cartoon Network as part of a Yogi Bear marathon.

In 2002, Spümcø created another Boo Boo cartoon, Boo Boo and the Man, which was made with Macromedia Flash and released on Cartoon Network's website.

A music video (known as a "Cartoon Groovie") for Yogi Bear used to air on Cartoon Network and Boomerang. It showcases clips of Yogi and Boo Boo stealing picnic baskets and annoying Ranger Smith.

=== Broadcasts ===
Yogi Bear aired on Cartoon Network from 1992 to 2004 and its sister channel, Boomerang until 2014, returning to the lineup in 2023. Additionally, Nickelodeon re-aired The Yogi Bear Show, Yogi's Gang, and Galaxy Goof-Ups under the umbrella title "Nickelodeon's Most Wanted: Yogi Bear" throughout the early 1990s. In the UK it aired on Cartoon Network from 1993 to 2001, CN TOO from 2006 to 2010 and Boomerang from 2000 to 2002.

In the Hanna-Barbera Personal Favorites video, William Hanna and Joseph Barbera picked their favorite Yogi Bear episodes, including the very first one, "Yogi Bear's Big Break", and Yogi's meeting some storybook friends: The Three Little Pigs, Snow White and the Seven Dwarfs, and Little Red Riding Hood.

== Comics ==
Over the years, several publishers have released Yogi Bear comic books.

- Dell Comics first published Yogi Bear comics starting in 1959 as part of their Four Color Comics line. The Four Color issue numbers were #1067 Yogi Bear (December 1, 1959), #1104 Yogi Bear Goes to College (June 1, 1960), #1162 Yogi Bear Joins the Marines (April 1, 1961), #1271 Yogi Bear's Birthday Party (November 1, 1961), #1310 Huck and Yogi Winter Sports (1962) (also featuring Huckleberry Hound), and #1349 Yogi Bear Visits the U.N. (January 1, 1962). In March 1961, Dell also published a 116-page one-shot entitled Huck and Yogi Jamboree (also featuring Huckleberry Hound). Starting in September 1961, Dell began publishing a regular comic under the title Yogi Bear which ran for six issues. The last Dell issue being July–September 1962.
- Gold Key Comics took over publishing the Yogi Bear title in October 1962, continuing the issue numbering from the last Dell issue. Gold Key published 33 issues from 1962 to 1970.
- Charlton Comics next did a title for 35 issues from 1970 to 1977.
- Marvel Comics did a title for nine issues in 1977.
- Harvey Comics then did several titles for a total of ten issues in 1992–94.
- Archie Comics regularly featured Yogi Bear stories in the anthology comics Hanna-Barbera All-Stars and Hanna-Barbera Presents. After the cancellation of both titles, Archie Comics put out one issue of a Yogi Bear comic in 1997.
- DC Comics semi-regularly featured Yogi in Cartoon Network Presents.
- DC Comics Scooby-Doo! Team-Up #35 (Bear-ly Scared)
- DC Comics Deathstroke/Yogi Bear Special #1

The Yogi Bear comic strip began February 5, 1961. Created by Gene Hazelton and distributed by the McNaught Syndicate, it ran from 1961 to 1988.

Hanna-Barbera has also produced giveaway instructional Yogi Bear comics on first aid (Creative First Aid: Yogi's Bear Facts (1986)) and earthquake preparedness (Yogi, the Be-Prepared Bear: Earthquake Preparedness for Children (1984) and Yogi's Bear Facts: Earthquake Preparedness (1988)). These were issued in connection with Yogi Bear being used as the mascot for Earthquake Preparedness Month in California, an annual campaign that ran each April for over ten years and also utilized Yogi in earthquake preparedness posters, advertisements, a cartoon, and other promotions including a special "Quakey Shakey Van" exhibit.

== Home media ==
On November 15, 2005, Warner Home Video released the complete series on DVD.

DVD name	Ep #	Release date	Additional information
The Yogi Bear Show – The Complete Series	33	November 15, 2005	Collectible animation cel; Original episode with bridges and bumpers; Never-before-seen animation sketches come to life; Yogi gets global: One episode in a variety of languages; Featurette on the art of Hanna-Barbera sound

== Licensing ==
- Yogi Bear lends his name to a chain of recreational vehicle and camping parks ("Yogi Bear's Jellystone Park Camp-Resorts"), with the first opening in 1969 in Sturgeon Bay, Wisconsin. As of 2019, more than eighty locations in the United States and Canada have hosted the parks.
- As of 2018, one restaurant remains from the chain bearing Yogi's name, "Yogi Bear's Honey Fried Chicken", in Hartsville, South Carolina.

== See also ==
- Boo-Boo Bear
- List of Yogi Bear live action voice actors
- List of Hanna-Barbera characters
- List of Yogi Bear characters
- List of works produced by Hanna-Barbera
- Theatrically released films based on Hanna-Barbera animations
- Yogi's Gang
- The New Yogi Bear Show
- Yo Yogi!
- Yogi's Treasure Hunt
