= Warrens, Wisconsin =

- Village
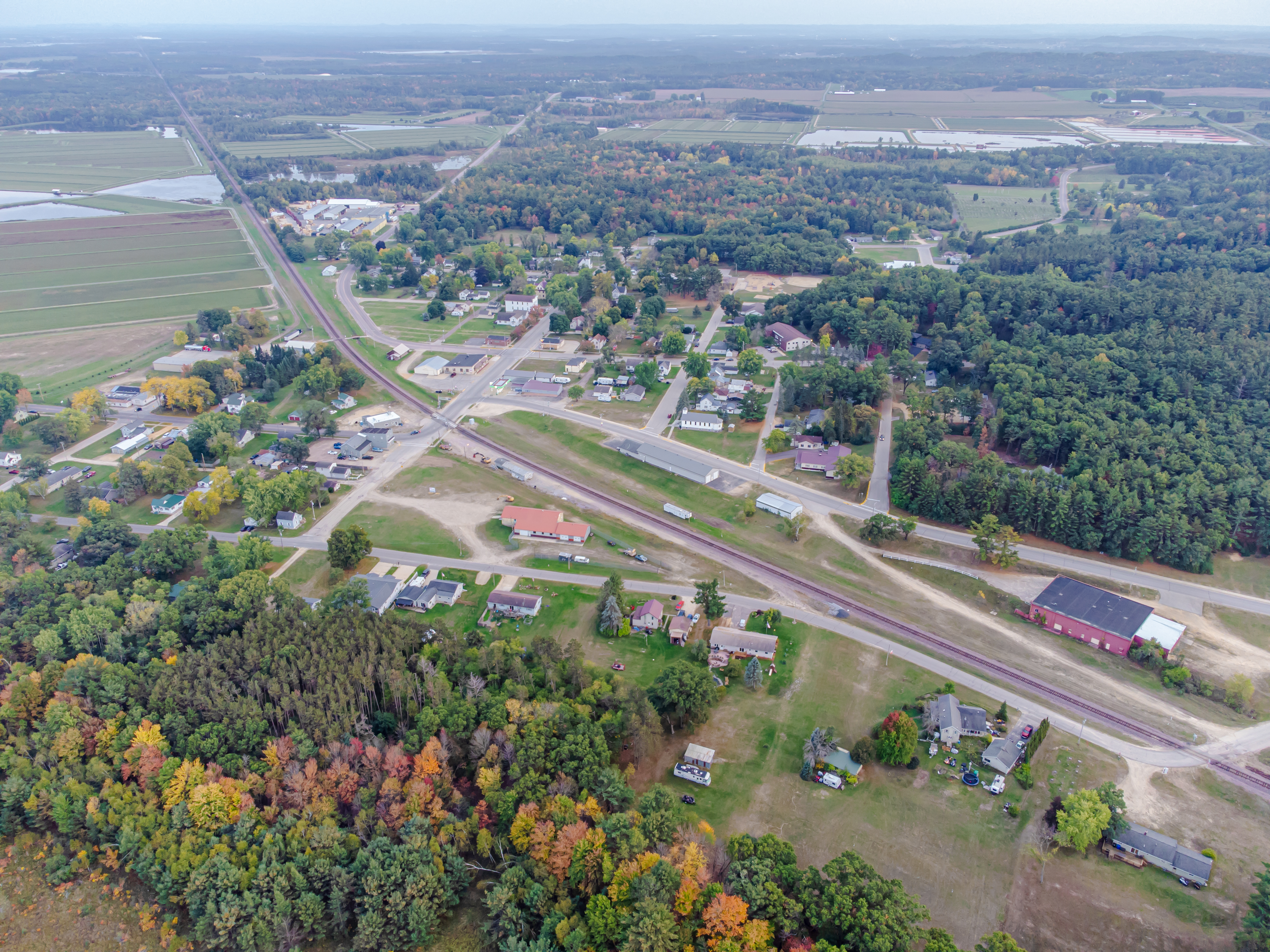

- Location of Warrens in Monroe County, Wisconsin.
- Coordinates: 44°7′49″N 90°30′3″W
- Country: United States
- State: Wisconsin
- County: Monroe

Area
  - Total: 1.50 sq mi (3.89 km^{2})
  - Land: 1.48 sq mi (3.84 km^{2})
  - Water: 0.019 sq mi (0.05 km^{2})
- Elevation: 1,020 ft (310 m)

Population (2020)
  - Total: 544
  - Density: 235.3/sq mi (90.86/km^{2})
- Time zone: UTC-6 (Central (CST))
  - Summer (DST): UTC-5 (CDT)
- Area code: 608
- FIPS code: 55-83450
- GNIS feature ID: 1576222
- Website: https://villageofwarrens.com/

Warrens is a village in Monroe County, Wisconsin, United States off I-94. The population was 544 at the 2020 census.

== Geography ==
Warrens is located at 44°7′49″N 90°30′3″W (44.130347, -90.500699).

According to the United States Census Bureau, the village has a total area of 1.47 square miles (3.81 km^{2}), of which 1.45 square miles (3.76 km^{2}) is land and 0.02 square miles (0.05 km^{2}) is water.

== Demographics ==
Historical population
Census	Pop.	Note	%±
1980	300		—
1990	343		14.3%
2000	286		−16.6%
2010	363		26.9%
2020	544		49.9%
U.S. Decennial Census

=== 2010 census ===
As of the census of 2010, there were 363 people, 154 households, and 96 families living in the village. The population density was 250.3 inhabitants per square mile (96.6/km^{2}). There were 375 housing units at an average density of 258.6 per square mile (99.8/km^{2}). The racial makeup of the village was 94.5% White, 1.1% African American, 1.9% Native American, and 2.5% from two or more races. Hispanic or Latino of any race were 0.8% of the population.

There were 154 households, of which 35.1% had children under the age of 18 living with them, 48.7% were married couples living together, 11.0% had a female householder with no husband present, 2.6% had a male householder with no wife present, and 37.7% were non-families. 32.5% of all households were made up of individuals, and 19.4% had someone living alone who was 65 years of age or older. The average household size was 2.36 and the average family size was 3.03.

The median age in the village was 37.5 years. 25.3% of residents were under the age of 18; 7.7% were between the ages of 18 and 24; 23.9% were from 25 to 44; 28.2% were from 45 to 64; and 14.9% were 65 years of age or older. The gender makeup of the village was 50.1% male and 49.9% female.

=== 2000 census ===
As of the census of 2000, there were 286 people, 113 households, and 76 families living in the village. The population density was 484.5 people per square mile (187.2/km^{2}). There were 128 housing units at an aver had children under the age of 18 living with them, 47.8% were married couples living together, 13.3% had a female householder with no husband present, and 32.7% were non-families. 24.8% of all households were made up of individuals, and 13.3% had someone living alone who was 65 years of age or older. The average household size was 2.53 and the average family size was 3.07.

In the village, the population was spread out, with 26.6% under the age of 18, 10.1% from 18 to 24, 26.6% from 25 to 44, 21.7% from 45 to 64, and 15.0% who were 65 years of age or older. The median age was 36 years. For every 100 females, there were 95.9 males. For every 100 females age 18 and over, there were 94.4 males.

The median income for a household in the village was $29,464, and the median income for a family was $37,500. Males had a median income of $26,932 versus $16,607 for females. The per capita income for the village was $13,005. About 1.4% of families and 10.7% of the population were below the poverty line, including 11.1% of those under the age of eighteen and 18.4% of those 65 or over.

== Economy ==
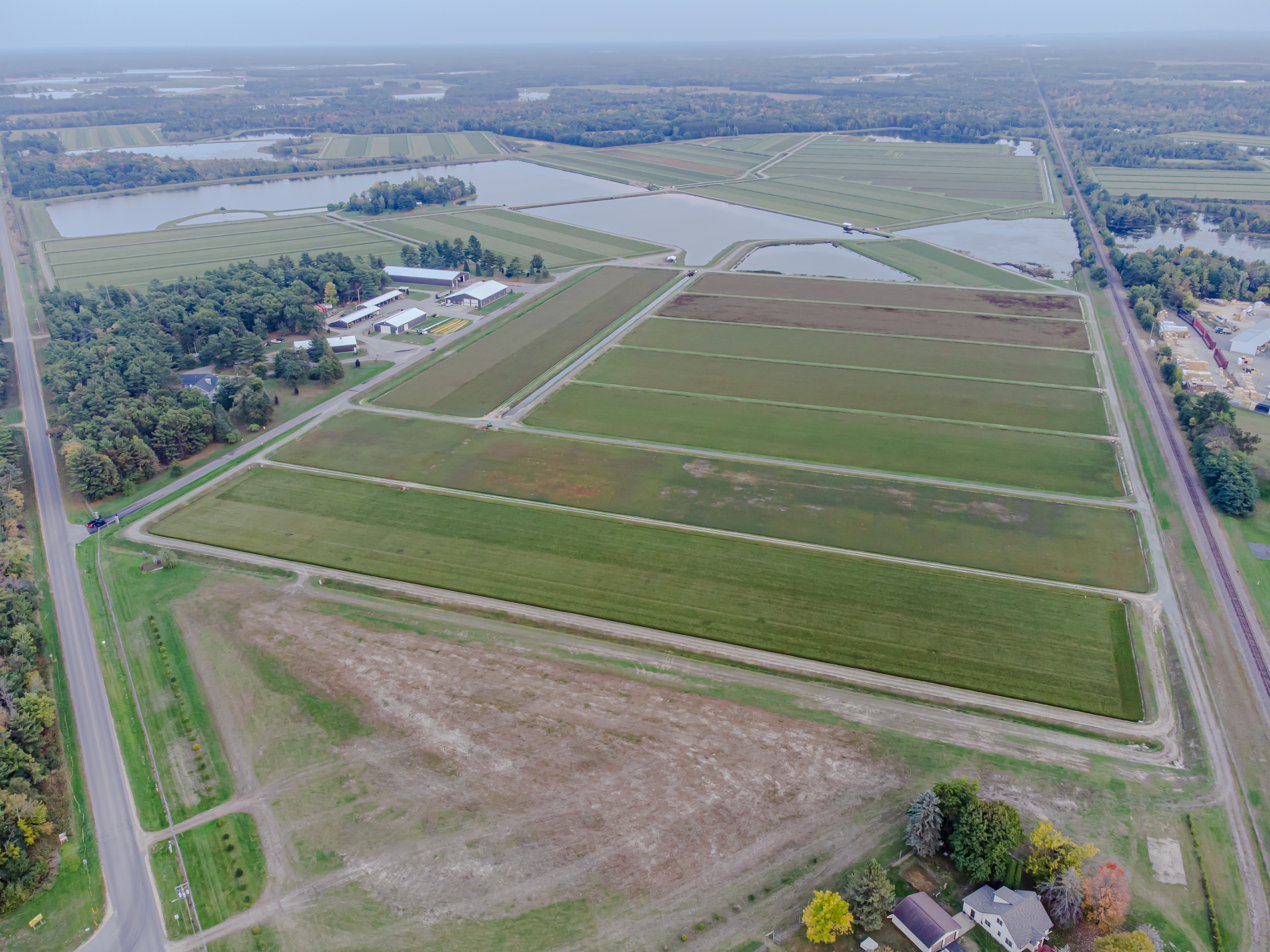
Cranberry farm near Warrens

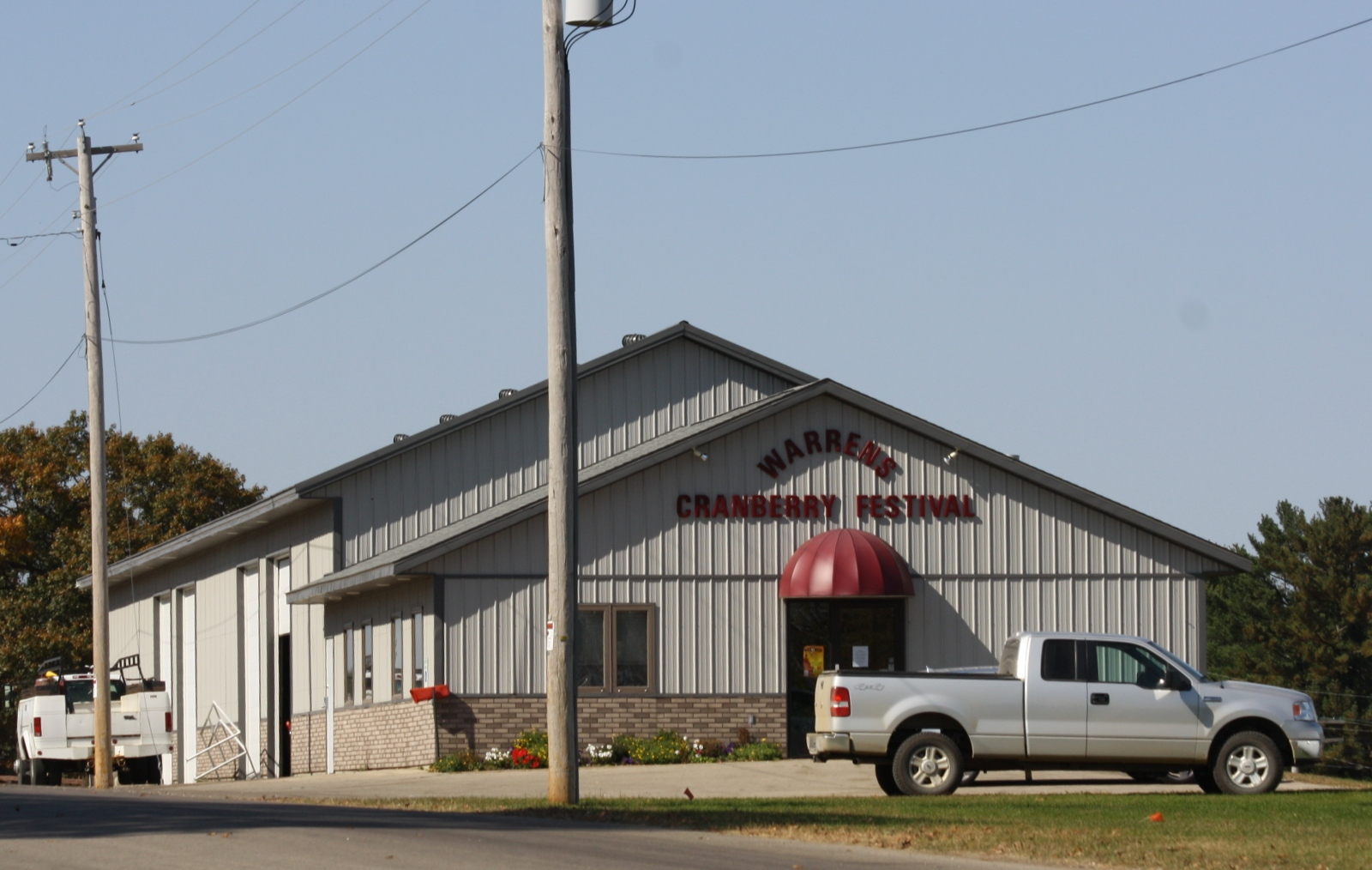
Warrens Cranberry Festival building

Warrens is the hub of a cranberry-growing region. The population of the small village of Warrens swells to over 100,000 each September when it hosts the annual Warrens Cranberry Festival. One of the largest such festivals in the country, Cranfest is held annually during the last full weekend of September. The festival includes over 100 farmers' market booths, 350 antique and flea market vendors, 800 arts and craft vendors, and Wisconsin's largest marching band parade. Due to the Coronavirus Pandemic of 2020, Cranfest was cancelled, with plans to hold a festival in 2021.

== Images ==
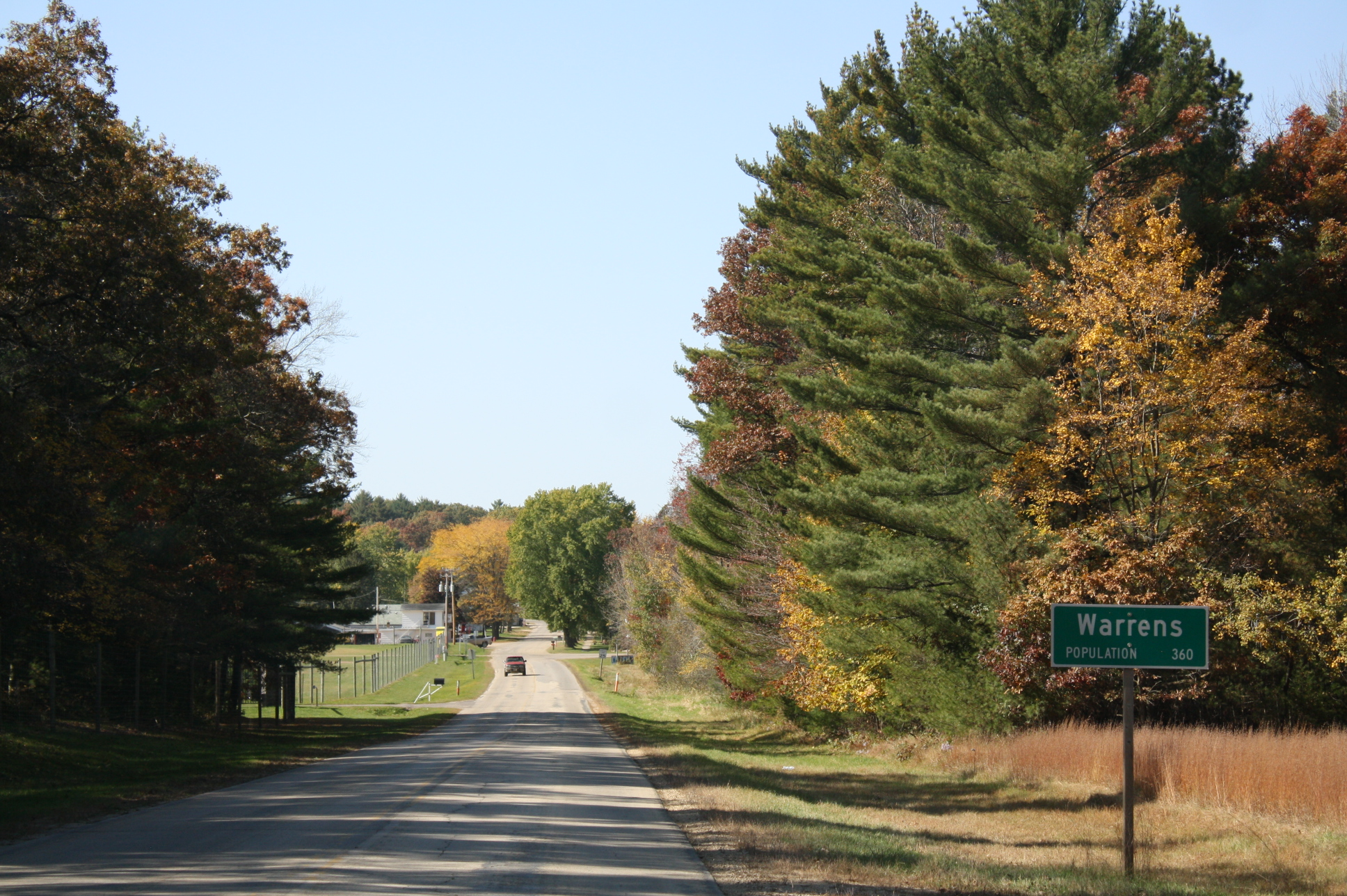
Sign

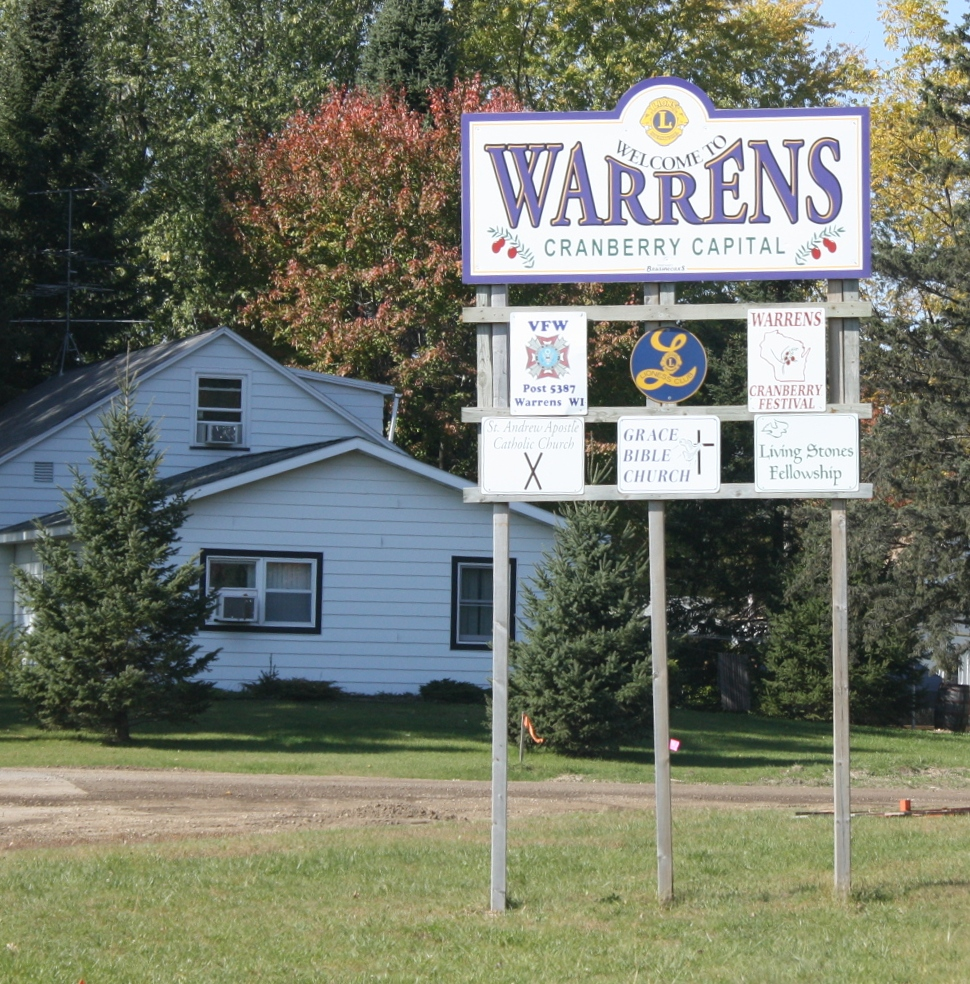
City welcome sign

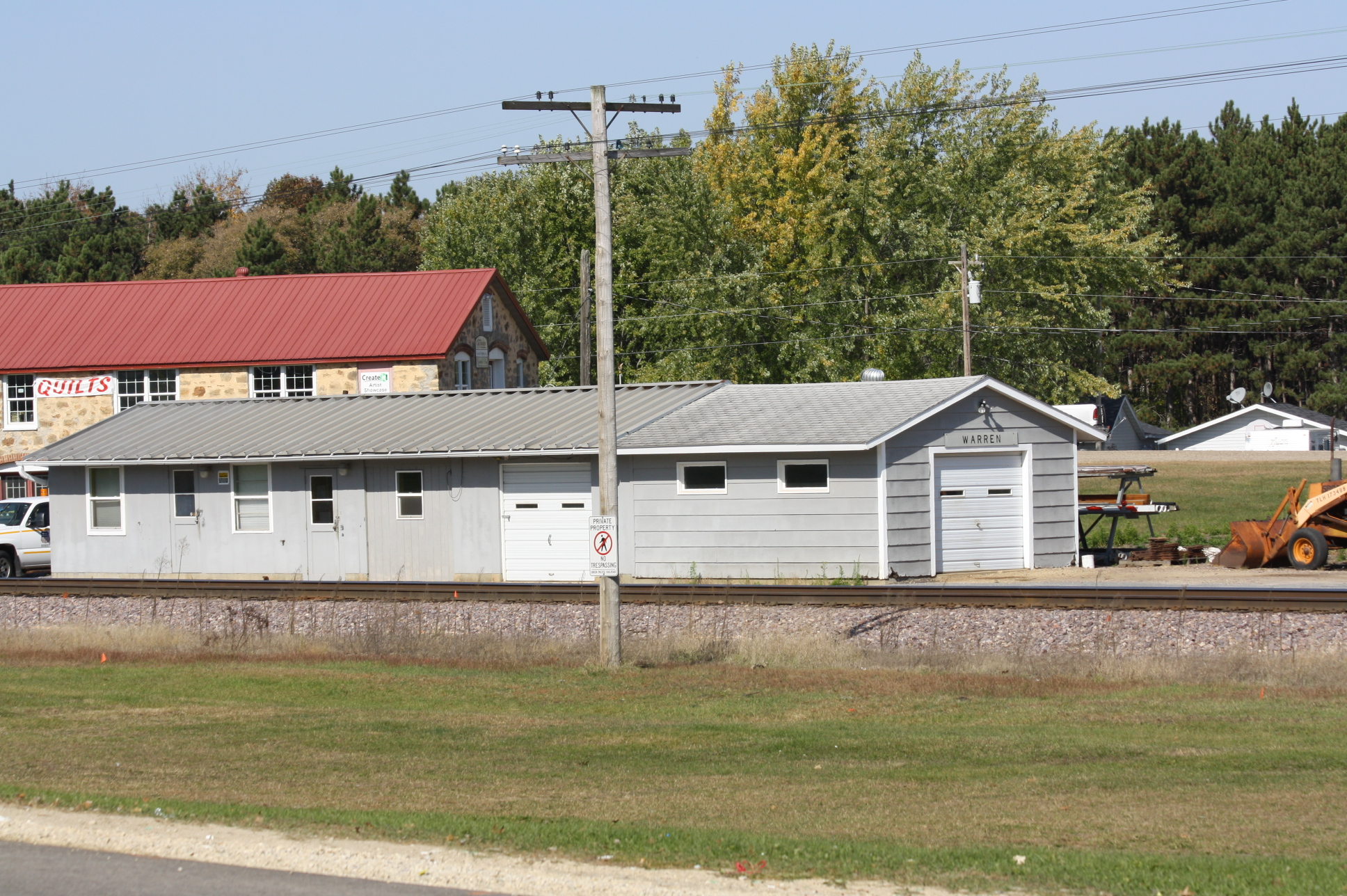
Train depot

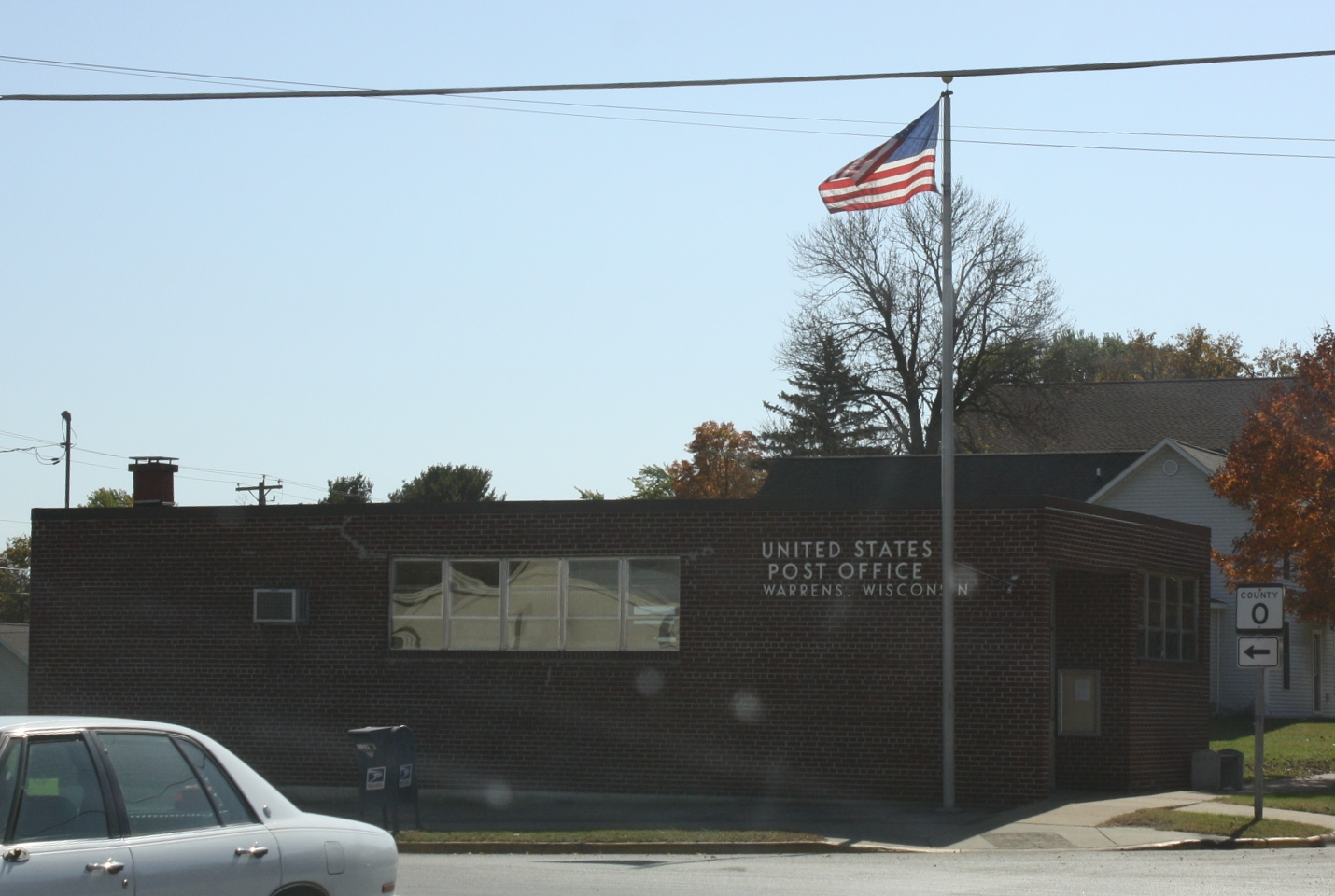
Post office

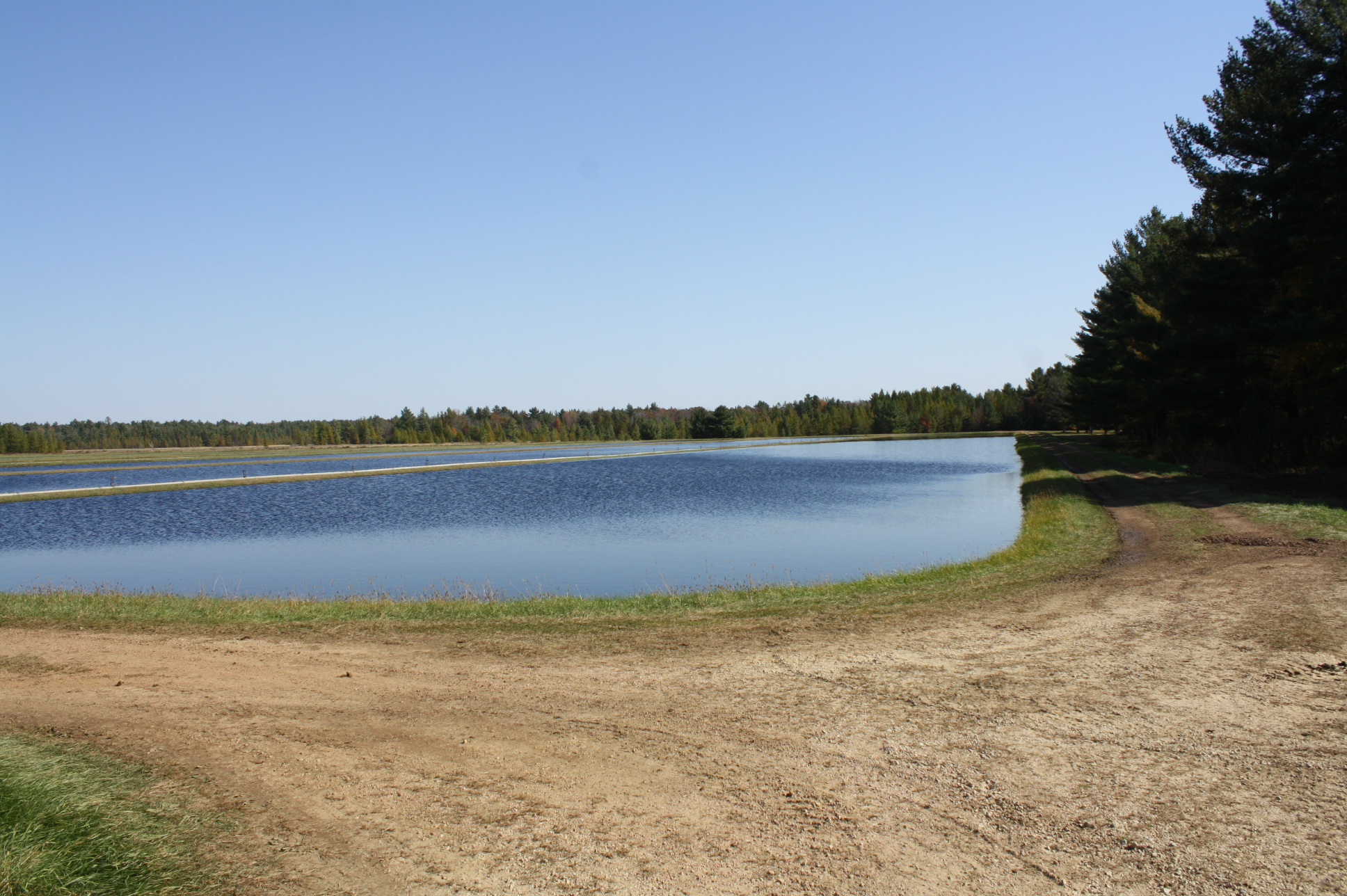
Cranberry bog east of Warrens

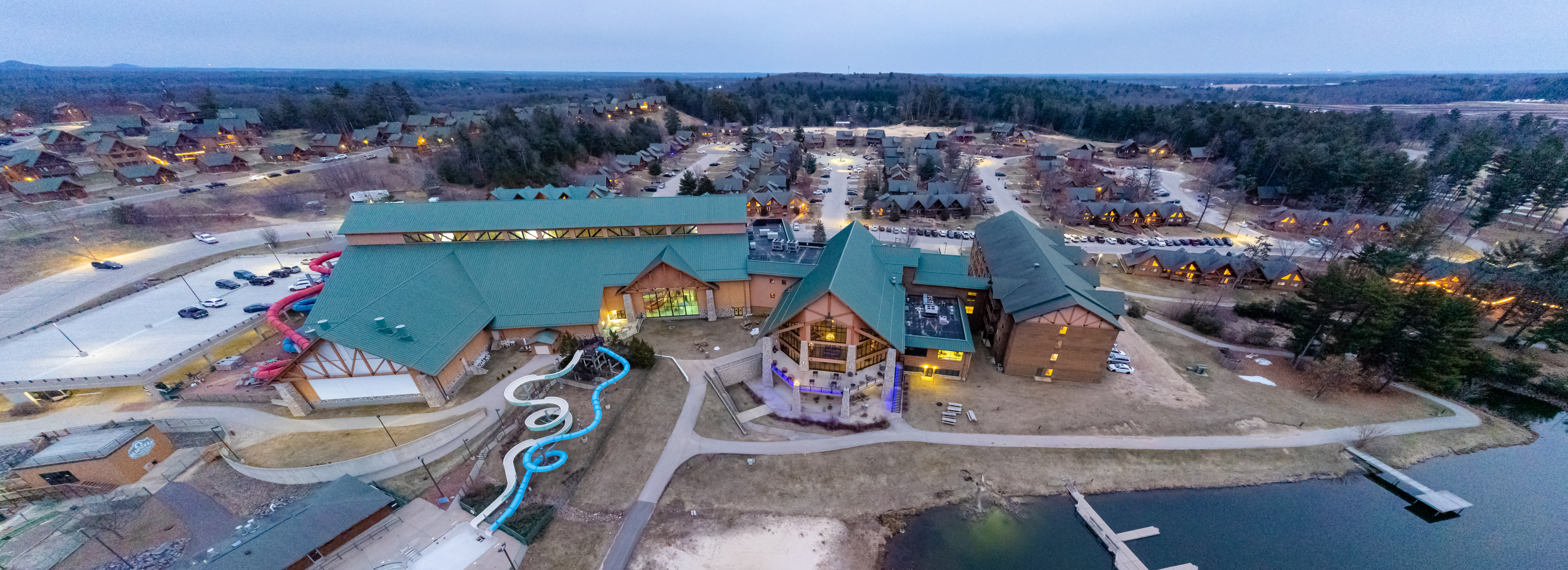
Three Bears Lodge
part of Yogi Bear's Jellystone Park Camp-Resorts

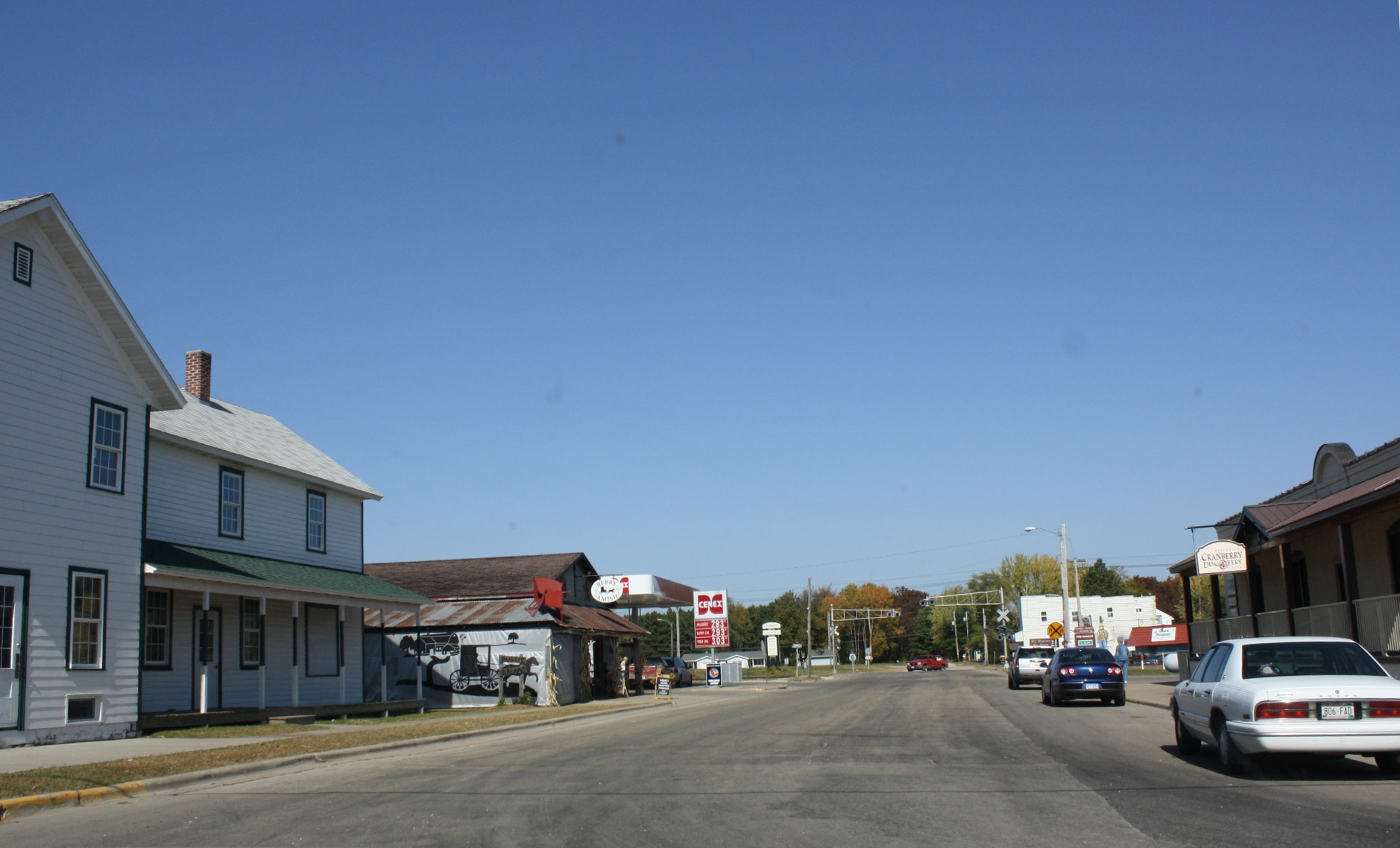
Looking north in downtown Warrens

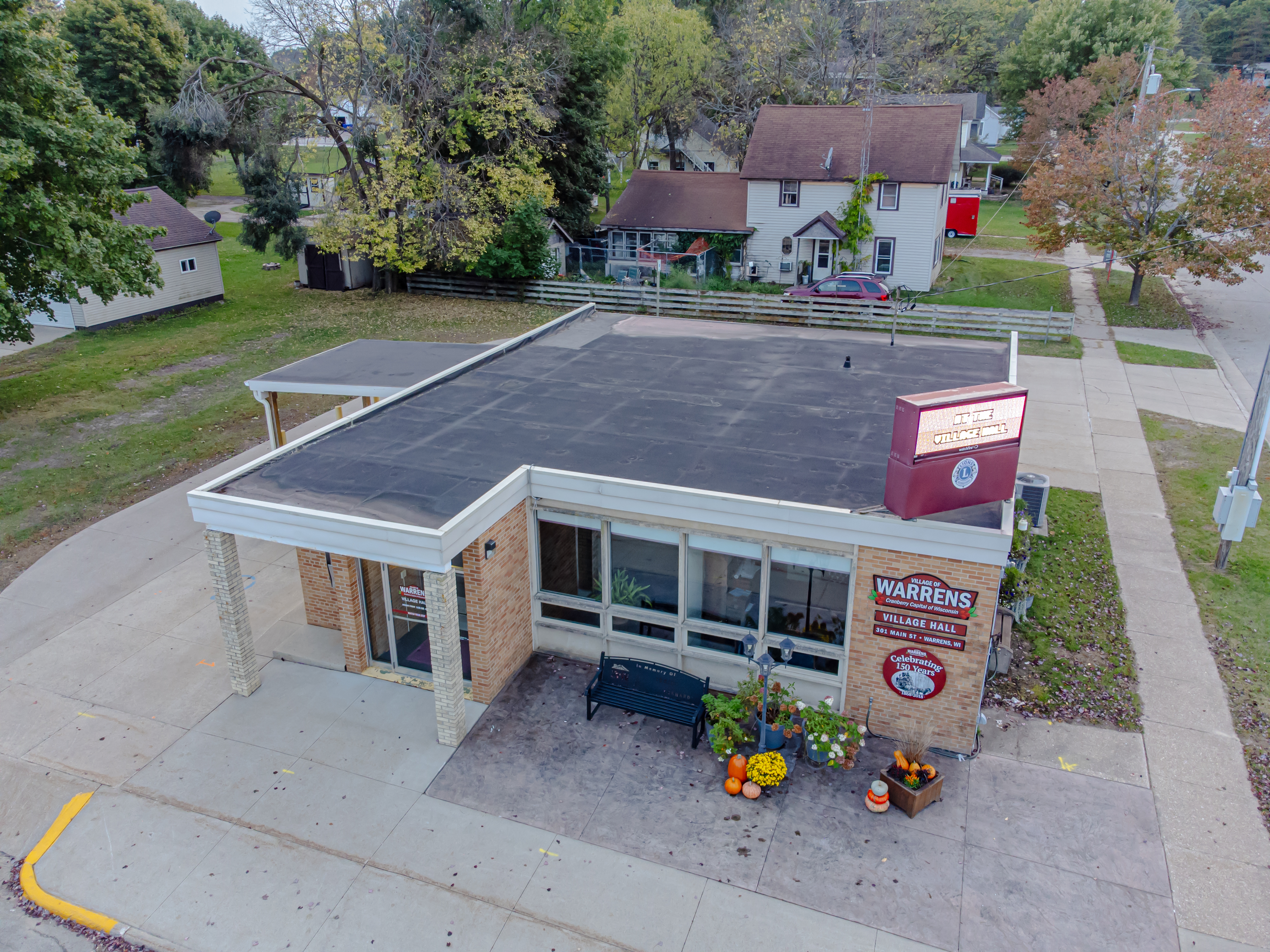
Warrens village hall

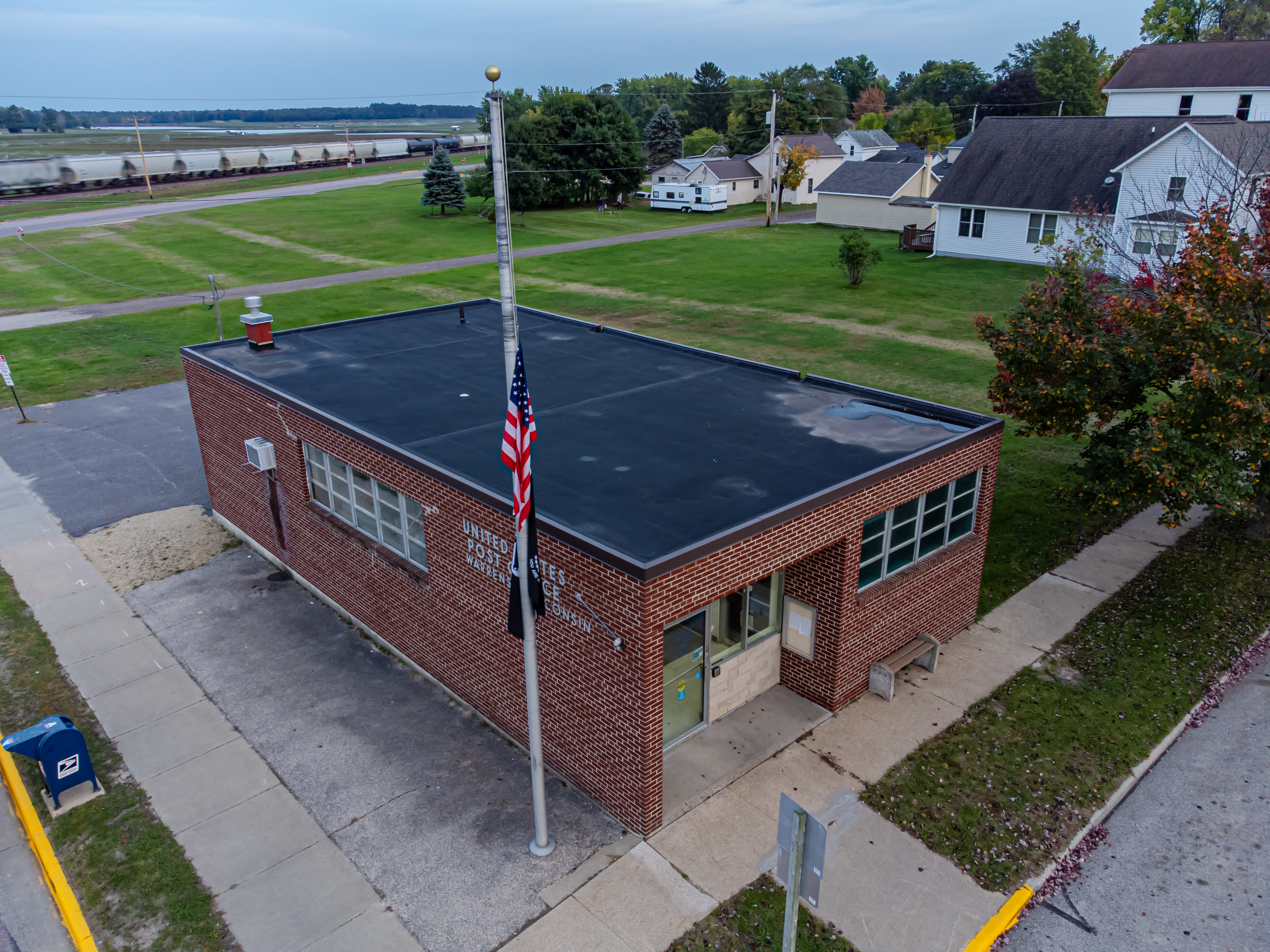
Warrens post office
