= Yogi and the Invasion of the Space Bears =

- Genre: Comedy; Science fiction
- Written by: Neal Barbera
- Directed by: Don Lusk; Ray Patterson
- Starring: Daws Butler; Don Messick; Julie Bennett; Susan Blu; Sorrell Booke; Victoria Carroll; Townsend Coleman; Peter Cullen; Linda Harmon; Maggie Roswell; Rob Paulsen; Michael Rye; Frank Welker; Patric Zimmerman
- Composer: Sven Libaek
- Country of origin: United States

Production
- Executive producers: William Hanna; Joseph Barbera
- Producer: Berny Wolf
- Running time: 90 minutes
- Production company: Hanna-Barbera Productions

Original release
- Network: Syndication
- Release: November 20, 1988

Yogi and the Invasion of the Space Bears is a 1988 animated made-for-television film produced by Hanna-Barbera for syndication as part of the Hanna-Barbera Superstars 10 series. This Hanna-Barbera production was the last to feature Daws Butler as the voice of Yogi Bear and Julie Bennett as Cindy Bear. Yogi and Boo-Boo go on an out-of-this-world voyage. When they are kidnapped by spacemen, the duo are cloned, and the clone bears soon invade Jellystone Park.

== Synopsis ==
Ranger Smith, fed up with Yogi Bear constantly stealing campers' picnic baskets, declares it to be "Y. B. Day", and plans to send him to Siberia. While in hiding, Yogi and Boo-Boo are abducted by two aliens, Zor 1 and Zor 2, and taken to Planet Daxson. The next day Ranger Smith and his sidekick Ranger Roubideux try to find Yogi but find Cindy instead, who is angry and refuses to talk. Meanwhile, Zor 1 and Zor 2 introduce Yogi and Boo-Boo to their boss, DAX Nova. DAX Nova creates clones of Yogi and Boo-Boo and sends them to take over Jellystone Park.

Cindy meets with Smith and Roubideux, and tells them she is worried about Yogi and Boo-Boo, but Smith, who thinks she might be "covering up" for them, tells her there is no sign of them. He then spots the clones and locks them up. He then notices another three clone pairs, and in a panic locks himself up before calling for help. Back in space the real Yogi and Boo-Boo need help to get home. Boo-Boo meets his love interest Snulu and asks for her help in returning home. DAX Nova attempts to catch them, but ends up capturing a pair of bear robots.

Back at Jellystone, Roubideux takes Cindy to see Smith, who tells her about the three Yogi Bears and three Boo-Boos and jokes that he was having a nightmare. Cindy visits Mountain Bear and asks where Yogi and Boo-Boo are gone. Upset, she starts crying, saying she misses Yogi. The next day she spots the Bear Robots and thinks she is having a nightmare, but she hears the voices of the real Yogi and Boo-Boo. Yogi tells her all about the Bear Robots, and tells her that they are called Dupiods. He tells her that he and Boo-Boo trapped Zor 1, Zor 2 and DAX Nova in space and saved the park. That night they find Boo-Boo singing to his girlfriend Snulu, whom he had to leave behind. Yogi tells Cindy that Boo-Boo can sing now, and Cindy is so happy that she gives him a big bear hug.

The next day Ranger Smith gets into trouble with the commissioner, but Yogi and his friends clean up the robots. Ranger Smith then thanks Yogi for saving the park.

== Voice cast ==
- Daws Butler as Yogi Bear
- Don Messick as Boo-Boo Bear / Ranger Smith
- Julie Bennett as Cindy Bear
  - Linda Harmon as Cindy Bear (singing voice)
- Susan Blu as Snulu
- Sorrell Booke as Mountain Bear
- Victoria Carroll as Additional Voices
- Townsend Coleman as Zor 1
- Peter Cullen as Ranger Roubideux
- Rob Paulsen as Zor 2
- Maggie Roswell as Little Girl
- Michael Rye as Ranger Jones
- Frank Welker as DAX Nova
- Patric Zimmerman as Ranger Brown

== Home media ==
The movie was released on VHS by Goodtimes Home Video in 1992. It would later receive a DVD release on December 7, 2010, by Warner Archive The film was released on Blu-ray both as part of a Hanna-Barbera Superstars 10 boxset and individually on its own from Warner Archive on February 20, 2024.
