= Stephen Worth =

American producer of animation (born 1959)

- Born: Stephen W. Worth; May 2, 1959 (age 67); Glendale, California, United States
- Education: University of California, Los Angeles
- Occupations: Film producer; television producer; animator; voice actor
- Years active: 1988–present

Stephen Worth (born May 2, 1959) is an American producer of animation.

Worth was a producer for Bagdasarian Productions, Ralph Bakshi and John Kricfalusi's production company Spümcø.

== Career ==
Worth studied at University of California, Los Angeles, receiving a Bachelor of Arts in design in 1982. He trained as an artist, but entered the film business as a production assistant at FilmFair studios, a commercial production house specializing in animation. He began researching the techniques and materials used in classic animations along with Lew Stude, and formed Vintage Ink & Paint, an animation art restoration facility in Burbank, California.

He later took a job as production assistant at Bagdasarian Productions, the studio responsible for the series Alvin and the Chipmunks. His first project for the company was to sort, package and market artwork from the feature The Chipmunk Adventure. In nine months, he became associate producer of Bagdasarian's TV series, recordings and prime time television specials.

Ralph Bakshi invited Worth to join him as animation production manager on the film Cool World. Worth handled production duties on Cool World for a little over a year, and left to work on representing the estates of Les Clark, Grim Natwick and Mel Blanc through Vintage Ink & Paint.

John Kricfalusi met Worth through the internet, and they became friends. Worth was the first to show Kricfalusi the "World Wide Web" and encouraged him to get involved in the then-new medium. Together, they created an online animation website called "Spumco's Wonderful World of Cartoons". Worth produced Weekend Pussy Hunt and The Goddamn George Liquor Program, the first Adobe Flash animated web cartoons, as well as an Annie Award-winning rock music video for Björk's single I Miss You.

Worth continued to work for Spumco for ten years as a producer on commercials, web cartoons, several television series and a prime time special for Cartoon Network called Boo Boo Runs Wild. In this program, he voiced the classic character Yogi Bear. When Spumco shut down production in 2005 after completing Ren & Stimpy "Adult Party Cartoon", Worth went to work on building an archive and museum of the art of animation. He also served on ASIFA-Hollywood's Board of Directors for 19 years.

In 2007, Worth was awarded the June Foray Annie Award for a significant and benevolent impact on the art of animation.

Worth currently runs the physical and online museum Animation Resources.

Worth also runs a hot dog enthusiast's website Hot Dog Spot.
