= Ed Benedict =

American animator (1912–2006)

- Born: August 23, 1912; East Cleveland, Ohio, U.S.
- Died: August 28, 2006 (aged 94); Auburn, California, U.S.
- Occupations: Animator, layout artist
- Years active: 1930–2001
- Employers: Walt Disney Animation Studios (1930–1933; 1945–1946); Walter Lantz Productions (1933–1937); Screen Gems (1937–1945; 1946–1949); Cartoon Films (1949–1952); MGM cartoon department (1952–1957); Hanna-Barbera (1957–1981; 1995–2001); Larry Harmon Pictures (1962); Cartoon Network Studios (1997-2001); Spümcø (1999)
- Spouse: Alice Benedict
- Children: 2

Ed Benedict (August 23, 1912 – August 28, 2006) was an American animator and layout artist. He is best known for his work with Hanna-Barbera Productions, where he helped design Fred Flintstone, Yogi Bear, and Huckleberry Hound.

== Career ==
Benedict began his animation career at Walt Disney Productions in 1930, and ultimately left three years later to work at Universal Pictures as an animator on the Oswald the Lucky Rabbit series. He worked at Screen Gems for the bulk of his career. He briefly returned to Disney in the 1940s, receiving his only Disney credit on the animated film Make Mine Music.

In 1952, Benedict was contacted by Tex Avery, who had worked with him at Universal. Avery invited Benedict to work on Avery's animation unit at MGM. Benedict performed lead animation and layout duties for Avery, and later for Michael Lah after Avery's departure from the studio. His work can be seen in Dixieland Droopy, The First Bad Man, and Deputy Droopy.

In the late 1950s, Benedict was recruited by former MGM animators William Hanna and Joseph Barbera to provide character designs for their new animated television series, The Ruff & Reddy Show, at Hanna-Barbera. He eventually became the primary character designer at Hanna-Barbera, designing Yogi Bear, Huckleberry Hound, Quick Draw McGraw, the various characters on The Flintstones, Magilla Gorilla, and many others.

Benedict left Hanna-Barbera in the late 1960s, but continued providing freelance work until his retirement in the early 1970s. Despite this, he later served as a character designer on the What a Cartoon! short Dino: Stay Out! and as one of the advisors on Cartoon Network's original series Johnny Bravo in 1997, specifically a background consultant upon request by creator Van Partible whom was a huge fan of his work. He is cited as a major inspiration by animator John Kricfalusi (whom Ed worked for on A Day in the Life of Ranger Smith), among others.

Benedict died in his sleep at his home in Auburn, California on August 28, 2006.

== Awards ==
- Golden Award, 1985
- Winsor McCay Award, 1994
