= Taffy =

Taffy may refer to:

== People ==
- An English slur for a Welshman (as used in the rhyme "Taffy was a Welshman")
- Taffy (nickname), various people
- Taffy (singer) (born 1963), British singer
- Taffy Thomas, British storyteller, appointed the UK's first Laureate for Storytelling in 2010

== Arts and entertainment ==
- "Taffy" (song), by Lisa Loeb, 1995
- Taffy (TV series)
- Taffy, a character in the ClayFighter series of video games
- Taffy Dare, a character in Captain Caveman and the Teen Angels
- "Taffy!", an episode of Anne of Green Gables: The Animated Series

== Other uses ==
- Taffy (candy), a type of chewy, often colored, candy
- Taffy, a nickname for Navy Task Units in World War II
- Taffy Entertainment

== See also ==
- Daffy (disambiguation)
- Taff (disambiguation)
- Tafi (disambiguation)
- Tiffy (disambiguation)
- Toffee, a sweet food
