= List of science fiction television programs, Y =

This is an inclusive list of science fiction television programs whose names begin with the letter Y.

== Y ==
Animated

- Yin Yang Yo! (2006–2009, US/Canada, animated)
- Yogi Bear (franchise) (elements of science fiction):
  - Yogi's Space Race (1978, animated)
  - Galaxy Goof-Ups (1978–1979, animated)
