= Tafi =

Tafi may refer to:

== People ==
- Andrea Tafi (disambiguation), several people
- John Tafi (born 2002), Samoan weightlifter
- Noushin Tafi (born 1981), Iranian traditional music singer

== Places ==
- Darreh Tefi (disambiguation)
- Tafí del Valle
- Tafí Viejo, Tucumán

== Other uses ==
- Carboxypeptidase B2
- Tafi language

== See also ==
- Taffy (disambiguation)
