= Marilyn Schreffler =

American actress (1945–1988)

- Born: Marilyn Sue Schreffler; June 14, 1945; Wichita, Kansas, U.S.
- Died: January 7, 1988 (aged 42); Los Angeles, California, U.S.
- Resting place: Memorial Park Cemetery, Topeka, Kansas
- Occupation: Voice actress
- Years active: 1977–1988
- Notable credit(s): Captain Caveman and the Teen Angels as Brenda Chance; The All New Popeye Hour as Olive Oyl

Marilyn Sue Schreffler (June 14, 1945 – January 7, 1988) was an American voice actress who provided voice-overs for several animated television series, mostly for Hanna-Barbera Productions.

== Biography ==
Marilyn Schreffler was born in Wichita, Kansas, on June 14, 1945. She graduated from Topeka West High School in 1963. She briefly attended Washburn University before moving on to Chicago and Cleveland, where she worked in several comedy groups. In the late 1960s and early 1970s, Schreffler had moved to Los Angeles and began her career doing voice-overs for animated TV programs.

Her first television voice-over roles for Hanna-Barbera were Brenda Chance on Captain Caveman and the Teen Angels and Daisy Mayhem on Scooby's All-Star Laff-A-Lympics in 1977. (For the "Laff-A-Lympics" segment, she reprised the role of Brenda from Captain Caveman and the Teen Angels which was airing concurrently.) Throughout the late 1970s and 1980s, she voiced a variety of characters on other Hanna-Barbera shows such as Yogi's Space Race, Galaxy Goof-Ups, Buford and the Galloping Ghost, Fred and Barney Meet the Thing, Scooby-Doo and Scrappy-Doo, The Richie Rich/Scooby-Doo Show, The Kwicky Koala Show, The Flintstone Comedy Show, The Smurfs, Mork & Mindy/Laverne & Shirley/Fonz Hour, as well as Ruby-Spears series including Thundarr the Barbarian, Heathcliff and Dingbat, Heathcliff and Marmaduke, Alvin and the Chipmunks, Saturday Supercade and Dragon's Lair. Schreffler was best known as the voice of Olive Oyl on The All New Popeye Hour (1978–83) and Popeye and Son (1987), also produced by Hanna-Barbera.

Although she was a behind-the-scenes actress, Schreffler did several on-screen acting roles on television shows in the 1980s such as Simon & Simon, Remington Steele, Airwolf and Newhart. She had voice parts in the 1987 thriller films Fatal Attraction and Jaws: The Revenge. She was also a voice in numerous TV commercials including some for Alka-Seltzer and Dole pineapple.

Schreffler died of liver cancer in 1988. Her last voice-acting role was the voice of Winnie Werewolf for the animated TV film Scooby-Doo and the Ghoul School which aired posthumously that year.

== Filmography ==
=== Films ===
Year	Title	Role	Notes
1984	Runaway	Lois	Voice
1985	Starchaser: The Legend of Orin		Animated film, Incidental & background voices
1985	Explorers		Special vocal effects
1986	The Golden Child	Kala	Voice
1986	Hyper Sapien: People from Another Star	Kirbi	Voice
1986	Vamp		Voice
1986	Heathcliff: The Movie	Mr. Woodley's Secretary	Voice, archive footage
1987	Jaws: The Revenge	Additional voices	
1987	Fatal Attraction	Party guest #14	

=== Television ===
Year	Title	Role	Notes
1977–1980	Captain Caveman and the Teen Angels	Brenda Chance	40 episodes
1977–1979	Scooby's All-Star Laff-A-Lympics	Brenda Chance, Daisy Mayhem	24 episodes
1978–1983	The All New Popeye Hour	Olive Oyl, Alice the Goon, Sea Hag, Swee'Pea	35 episodes
1978	Yogi's Space Race	Wendy	13 episodes
1978	Galaxy Goof-Ups	Additional voices	13 episodes
1979	Buford and the Galloping Ghost	Wendy	13 episodes (The Galloping Ghost segment)
1979	The Popeye Valentine Special: Sweehearts at Sea	Olive Oyl, Sea Hag	TV special
1979	Fred and Barney Meet the Thing	Betty Harkness, Miss Twilly	13 episodes (The Thing segment)
1979	Casper's Halloween Special	Winifred Witch	TV special
1979	The B.B. Beegle Show	Additional voices	TV pilot episode
1979	Scooby Goes Hollywood	Cherie, Sis and Receptionist	TV special
1979–1980	Fred and Barney Meet the Shmoo	Betty Harkness, Miss Twilly	13 episodes (The Thing segment)
1979–1980	Scooby-Doo and Scrappy-Doo	Additional voices	
1980	Thundarr the Barbarian	Additional voices	
1980–1981	Heathcliff and Dingbat	Additional voices	
1980–1981	The Richie Rich/Scooby-Doo Show	Additional voices	
1980	Yogi's First Christmas	Snively	TV film
1981	The Pink Panther in: Pink at First Sight	Additional voices	TV special
1981–1982	Heathcliff and Marmaduke	Sonia, Barbie	
1981	Trollkins	Lola La Trolla	13 episodes
1981	The Kwicky Koala Show	Additional voices	
1981–1982	Laverne & Shirley in the Army	Additional voices	
1981	The Flintstone Comedy Show	Weathergirl	Episode: "Stormfront and Weathergirl" (Captain Caveman segment)
1981	Spider-Man	Sally Ann Beaumont	Episode: "The Sandman is Coming"
1982	Jokebook	Additional voices	
1982–1983	The Incredible Hulk	Computer	Episode: "Prisoner of the Monster"
1982	Mork & Mindy/Laverne & Shirley/Fonz Hour	Additional voices	Episode: "Who's Minding the Brat?"
1982	The Smurfs	Additional voices	
1982	Meatballs & Spaghetti	Additional voices	
1982	The Scooby & Scrappy-Doo/Puppy Hour	Additional voices	
1982	Spider-Man and His Amazing Friends	Bonnie	Episode: "A Firestar is Born"
1982–1983	Shirt Tales	Additional voices, T.J. Tiger	23 episodes, Episode: "T.J's Visit"
1983	The Dukes	Additional voices	13 episodes
1983	The New Scooby and Scrappy-Doo Show	Additional voices	
1983	The Littles	Additional voices	13 episodes
1983	Alvin and the Chipmunks	Additional voices	13 episodes
1983	Saturday Supercade	Additional voices	13 episodes
1984	Rose Petal Place	Nastina	TV special
1984	The New Scooby-Doo Mysteries	Additional voices	
1984	Dragon's Lair	Additional voices	Episode: "Tale of the Enchanted Gift"
1984	Heathcliff and The Catillac Cats	Mrs. Eagle	Episode: "Wild Cat Heathcliff/Kitten Around"
1984	Pole Position	Kuma	13 episodes
1985	Rose Petal Place: Real Friends	Marigold, Nastina	TV special
1985	Challenge of the GoBots	Additional voices	
1985	G.I. Joe: A Real American Hero	Additional voices	
1985	CBS Storybreak	Additional voices	Episode: "Robutt: A Tale of Tails"
1985	The Jetsons	Additional voices	Episode: "Elroy in Wonderland"
1985–1986	Paw Paws	Additional voices	21 episodes
1985	CBS Storybreak	Additional voices	Episode: "Witch-Cat"
1986	Yogi's Treasure Hunt	Additional voices	Episode: "Riddle in the Middle of the Earth"
1986–1987	The Flintstone Kids	Rocky Ratrock, Flo Rubble	13 episodes
1987	Popeye and Son	Olive Oyl, Lizzie, Puggy, Sea Hag	
1987	Yogi Bear and the Magical Flight of the Spruce Goose	Bernice	TV film
1988	Scooby-Doo and the Ghoul School	Winnie Werewolf	TV film
1989	CBS Storybreak	Additional voices	Episode: "Ratha's Creature" (Final Role; released posthumously)

=== Live-action ===
Year	Title	Role	Notes
1983	Simon & Simon	Motel Clerk Mindy	Episode: "Too Much of a Good Thing"
1984	Remington Steele	Betty Lynn	Episode: "Small Town Steele"
1984	Airwolf	Angie	Episode: "Firestorm"
1986	Newhart	Gloria Tate	Episode: "The Stratford Horror Picture Show"
