= Darreh Tefi =

Darreh Tefi or Darreh-ye Tefi or Darreh Tafi or Darreh Tofi or Darreh-ye Tafi (Persian: دره تفي) may refer to:

- Darreh Tefi, Marivan
- Darreh-ye Tafi, Saqqez
