= Hanna-Barbera Educational Filmstrips =

Animated film series

- Directed by: Art Scott
- Written by: Gary M. Stamm; Sloan Nibley; Dolores Lawler
- Starring: The Flintstones; Yogi Bear; The Jetsons; Scooby-Doo; The Banana Splits; Jabberjaw; Around the World Kids
- Music by: Hoyt Curtin
- Production company: Hanna-Barbera Productions
- Distributed by: Radmar, Inc.
- Country: United States
- Language: English

Hanna-Barbera Educational Filmstrips is a series of filmstrips of educational material produced by Hanna-Barbera Productions' educational division. The series ran from 1977 to 1980 for a total of 26 titles, featuring the studio's animated characters from The Flintstones, The Yogi Bear Show, The Jetsons, Scooby-Doo, Where Are You!, The Banana Splits, Cattanooga Cats, and Jabberjaw.

The series was designed for elementary- and secondary-school children and distributed in classroom environments by Radmar, Inc. Each audiovisual package consisted of two filmstrips in plastic cases featuring high-quality 35 mm images of Hanna-Barbera characters, cassette tapes, and a teacher's guide booklet. The voices for the animated characters were provided by the same voice actors from their respective television series.

Robert Letro, supervisor of teacher education and director of educational media laboratory at the University of California, Irvine served as educational advisor for the series, while Art Scott served as production director, writer, and production supervisor for Hanna-Barbera Educational Division.

== Filmstrips ==
| Nº | Year | Set # | Character(s) | Title | Description and contents |
|---|---|---|---|---|---|
| 1 | 1977 | 51600 | Around the World Kids | Bolivian Mountain Village | Finny, Jenny and Hoppy travel to Lake Titicaca in Bolivia where they learn about the social, domestic, and economic ways of life of the Aymara Indians.: Part 1: Aymara Indian Children; Part 2: Aymara Indians |
| 2 | 1977 | 51700 | Around the World Kids | A Japanese Fishing Village | Finny, Jenny and Hoppy travel to Japan and visit the coastal village of Sajima where the entire population depends on the fishing trade for its livelihood.: Part 1: Sajima, Japan; Part 2: School Children of Sajima, Japan |
| 3 | 1978 | 51800 | Bamm-Bamm | Bamm-Bamm Tackles a Term Paper | Bamm-Bamm goes through all aspects of a term paper as he selects a topic, learns to use the library for research, outlines his material and writes a coherent draft.: Part 1: Research; Part 2: Organization; Part 3: Writing |
| 4 | 1978 | 51900 | Scooby-Doo | The Great Grammar Hunt | Velma explains to Shaggy and Scooby the basic parts of speech and leads them through the task of using those parts in phrases, clauses and complete sentences.: Part 1: Parts of Speech; Part 2: Phrases and Clauses; Part 3: Sentences |
| 5 | 1978 | 52000 | Scooby-Doo | Scooby-Doo Locates the Locus | Scooby, Shaggy and Velma learn about the locus of points and its uses in various geometric principles such as circles, angles, parallels, and perpendicular bisectors. |
| 6 | 1978 | 52100 | The Banana Splits | Healthy and Happy | Bingo doesn't feel well because he hasn't been eating well; the Banana Splits learn how better nutrition will help, and a toothache reminds Bingo to brush and see the dentist.: Part 1: Bingo Gets the Gooey Goops; Part 2: A Toothache Isn't Fun |
| 7 | 1978 | 52200 | The Banana Splits | We Have Five Senses | The Banana Splits discuss how the senses work and whether one sense is needed more than the others; they also discuss how to care for each sense organ. |
| 8 | 1978 | 52300 | The Banana Splits | Safety First | The Banana Splits find themselves in a strange situation and have to learn how to read danger signals and also learn safe crossing rules.: Part 1: Look Out For Danger; Part 2: Let's Cross Safely |
| 9 | 1978 | 52400 | Scooby-Doo | Black Explorers | Velma's friend Tina tells about Matthew Henson, who explored the Arctic with Robert Peary and learned the Eskimo language and ways; Shaggy does research on James Beckwourth.: Part 1: Matthew Henson: Black Explorer; Part 2: James Beckwourth: Black Explorer |
| 10 | 1978 | 52500 | Scooby-Doo | The Signs of the Times | Scooby, Shaggy and Velma goes on a vacation to the Rocky Mountain National Park where they encounter and learn to identify the new international road signs. |
| 11 | 1978 | 55700 | The Jetsons | Geometric Jetson | The teach-a-computer robot helps Elroy and George with geometry homework and basic concepts; geometric formulas are derived in ways that can make them easy.: Part 1: Points, Lines and Angles; Part 2: Polygons; Part 3: Perimeter and Area; Part 4: More Perimeters and Areas |
| 12 | 1978 | 55800 | Scooby-Doo | Let's Go to Press | Scooby, Shaggy and Velma study newspaper production which includes objectivity, insight, legal aspects, photo-journalism and mechanics of printing.: Part 1: A Background; Part 2: News Reporting; Part 3: Features and Editorials; Part 4: Editing and Printing |
| 13 | 1979 | 55900 | Jabberjaw | The Silent Hunters | At Marineland, Jabberjaw and Shelly discuss the evolution and characteristics of sharks along with their anatomy.: Part 1: The Hunter; Part 2: The Hunt |
| 14 | 1979 | 56000 | Jabberjaw | A Whale of a Tale | At Marineland, Shelly explains to Jabberjaw about the characteristics, habits, and abilities of whales, dolphins and porpoises.: Part 1: Whales; Part 2: Dolphins and Porpoises |
| 15 | 1979 | 56600 | The Banana Splits | It's a Sense-sational World | The Banana Splits take a tour through a museum's exhibit of each of the human sense organs and learn how to understand and care for their senses.: Part 1: Right On the Nose; Part 2: The Eyes Have It; Part 3: Lend An Ear; Part 4: Taste of Success; Part 5: Just the Right Touch |
| 16 | 1979 | 56700 | Yogi Bear | Play it Safe | Yogi learns about safety hazards at home and at school, and to make children aware of ways to avoid or prevent these hazards.: Part 1: Home Safe Home; Part 2: School Days-Safe Days |
| 17 | 1979 | 56800 | Bamm-Bamm | Information Please | Pebbles guides Bamm-Bamm through the use of library tools when he has a research project: the card catalog, the Dewey Decimal System and many reference books.: Part 1: The Card Catalog; Part 2: The Reference Collection; Part 3: More Reference Tools |
| 18 | 1979 | 56900 | Scooby-Doo | Help Wanted | Shaggy, Velma and Scooby visit their high school advisor and learn how to prepare a résumé, a cover letter and how to present themselves during a job interview.: Part 1: Résumé-The Foot in the Door; Part 2: Interviewing and Applications |
| 19 | 1980 | 58500 | The Banana Splits | Meet the Microbes | When Bingo discovers moldy food, the other Banana Splits talk to him about microorganisms, both helpful and harmful, including protection from harmful forms.: Part 1: Molds, Viruses and Bacteria; Part 2: Protecting Ourselves |
| 20 | 1980 | 58600 | The Flintstones | A Weighty Problem | Fred realizes how overweight he is, so he and Barney decide to learn about weight control at the library; they learn about fat and to control it through a definite program.: Part 1: The Problem; Part 2: The Solution |
| 21 | 1980 | 58700 | The Flintstones | Fire Alarm | Pebbles Flintstone learns about safety in case of fire at school; she discusses her lessons with Fred and Barney so that they will have a safe home and a fire safety plan.: Part 1: Home Fire Dangers; Part 2: Getting Out Safely |
| 22 | 1980 | 58800 | The Flintstones | Fire Escape | Fred, Barney and Pebbles demonstrate how to make a home fire-resistant and how to develop a plan of action in case of fire.: Part 1: Home Fire Prevention; Part 2: Detection and Evacuation |
| 23 | 1980 | 58900 | Yogi Bear | Yogi Bear Visits His Medical Friends | Yogi and Boo-Boo learn about the equipment and procedures used by various types of medical personnel, and overcome their fears of going to a doctor, dentist or hospital.: Part 1: The Dentist; Part 2: The Doctor | Part 3: The Hospital |
| 24 | 1980 | 59000 | Scooby-Doo | Skin Deep | When Shaggy doesn't want to be seen with bad acne, the gang takes him to see the dermatologist who tells him about acne and what he can do to control its symptoms.: Part 1: What Is Acne?; Part 2: Toward Clearer Skin |
| 25 | 1980 | 59100 | The Jetsons | Down to Earth Nutrition | Elroy Jetson learns in history about the food that people ate in the 20th century; the Jetsons' computer teaches them about food groups and planning a balanced diet.: Part 1: Nutrition Basics; Part 2: Deficiencies and Imbalances; Part 3: Nutrition Planning |
| 26 | 1980 | 59200 | The Flintstones | The Flintstones' Driving Guide | Pebbles learns about the safe operation of an automobile and appropriate ways of responding to common accident-causing driving hazards.: Part 1: The Driving Controls; Part 2: Gauges and Safety Controls; Part 3: Common Driving Hazards; Part 4: Emergency Procedures |

=== Voice cast ===
- Daws Butler as Yogi Bear (#16, #23), Elroy Jetson (#11, #25), Bingo (#6-7-8, #15, #19)
- Henry Corden as Fred Flintstone (#20-21-22, #26)
- Casey Kasem as Shaggy (#4-5, #9-10, #12, #18, #24)
- Allan Melvin as Drooper (#6-7-8, #15, #19)
- Don Messick as Bamm-Bamm Rubble (#3, #17), Boo-Boo Bear (#16, #23), George Jetson (#11, #25), Scooby-Doo (#4-5, #9-10, #12, #18, #24), Finny and Hoppy (#1-2)
- Patricia Parris as Shelly (#13-14), Velma (#9-10, #12, #18, #24), Pebbles Flintstone (#17, #20-21-22, #26)
- Pat Stevens as Velma (#4-5)
- John Stephenson as Barney Rubble (#3, #17, #20-21-22, #26)
- Janet Waldo as Pebbles Flintstone (#3) and Jenny (#1-2)
- Frank Welker as Jabberjaw (#13-14)
- Paul Winchell as Fleegle (#6-7-8, #15, #19)

=== Production crew ===
- Coordinator of Educational Programs: Robert Letro (University of California)
- Educational Advisors: Robert Letro, Billie Letro, Ruth Ann Stamm, Alan Massengale, Dolores Lawler (University of California)
- Production Supervisor: Gary M. Stamm (University of California)
- Writers: Gary M. Stamm, Sloan Nibley, Dolores Lawler (University of California)
- Production Director: Art Scott (Hanna-Barbera)
- Production Designers: Jack Manning, W.R. Kowalchuk, Peter Alvarado, Alex Toth, Frank C. Smith, Homer Jonas, Don Holcombe (Hanna-Barbera)
- Published by: Barr Films (Pasadena, California)
- Distributed by: RADMAR, Inc.

== Other Hanna-Barbera filmstrip titles ==
=== Xerox Filmstrip Set ===
| Nº | Year | Title | Description, contents and voice cast |
|---|---|---|---|
| 1 | 1976 | The Flintstones: Library Skills Series | Fred, Barney and Pebbles present an overview in borrowing a book at the library.: Part 1: Barney Borrows a Book; Voice cast: Alan Reed as Fred Flintstone | John Stephenson as Barney Rubble | Sally Struthers as Pebbles Flintstone |
| 1 | 1976 | The Flintstones: Library Skills Series | Fred, Barney and Pebbles present an overview in returning a book at the library.: Part 2: Barney Returns a book; Voice cast: Alan Reed as Fred Flintstone | Mel Blanc as Barney Rubble | Janet Waldo as Pebbles Flintstone |

=== Learning Tree Filmstrip Set ===
| Nº | Year | Title | Description, contents and voice cast |
|---|---|---|---|
| 1 | 1982 | Learning About Communities with Scooby-Doo | Scooby-Doo and Shaggy learn about the characteristics of a community when they visit a ghost town.: Part 1: What is a Community? | Part 2: What's in a Community? | Part 3: What We Do in a Community |
| 2 | 1982 | Learning About Citizenship with Yogi Bear | Part 1: What is Citizenship? | Part 2: Citizenship and Government | Part 3: Good Citizenship |
| 3 | 1982 | Learning About Holidays with The Banana Splits | The Banana Splits describe the types, origins and purposes of holidays and the customs and manners of holiday celebrations.: Part 1: What is a Holiday | Part 2: Why We Celebrate Holidays | Part 3: Seasons of the Holidays |
| 4 | 1982 | Learning About Groups and Rules with Yogi Bear | Yogi Bear describes the origins, rationale and makeup of social groups and the rules they live by.: Part 1: What Are Groups? | Part 2: Why We Have Rules | Part 3: Living with Rules |
| 5 | 1982 | Learning About Work with The Jetsons | The teach-a-computer robot explains to Elroy and George about work, introduce work styles, and depict a capsule history of how work and jobs have evolved.: Part 1: Why We Work | Part 2: Sharing the Work | Part 3: Jobs for Everyone; Voice cast: Don Messick as George Jetson | Daws Butler as Elroy Jetson |
| 6 | 1982 | Learning About Other People with Huckleberry Hound | Huckleberry Hound presents a variety of interpersonal relationship concepts.: Part 1: Looking at Others | Part 2: Living with Others | Part 3: Understanding Others |
| 7 | 1982 | Learning About Families with The Flintstones | Part 1: What is a Family? | Part 2: Families Work Together | Part 3: Being Part of a Family |
| 8 | 1982 | Learning About Basic Needs with The Flintstones | Part 1: Needs and Wants | Part 2: Food, Clothing and Shelter | Part 3: Meeting Our Needs |

== See also ==
- List of works produced by Hanna-Barbera Productions
- Animation in the United States in the television era
