= Patricia Parris =

American voice actress

- Born: Hamilton, Ohio, U.S.
- Other names: Pat Parris, Patty Parris, Patti Parris, Patricia E. Parris
- Education: Brenau University
- Occupation: Actress
- Years active: 1976–2005

Patricia Parris (also professionally credited as Pat Parris, Patty Parris, Patti Parris and Patricia E. Parris) is an American actress who provided voice-overs for several animated television series for such studios as Hanna-Barbera, The Walt Disney Company, Ruby-Spears, DIC Entertainment, Universal Animation Studios, Sunbow Entertainment and The Jim Henson Company. She has voice acted in television, film, radio, read-along story recordings, video games and theme park attractions.

== Early life ==
Parris was born in Hamilton, Ohio, the daughter of Col. Howard Lindsey Parris, a United States Air Force veteran, and Bernice Claire Rogers. She graduated from the women's college of Brenau University in 1972 where she majored in drama, English and secondary education, directing and performing in plays such as My Fair Lady and The Children's Hour. She would also introduce her show on the school radio station with her ever-expanding uncanny knack for accents and impersonation.

== Career ==
Once she graduated, Parris moved to Hollywood, California and studied voice acting under the guidance of Daws Butler (voice of Yogi Bear) as a student in his voice acting workshop. Her first television voice-over role was Shelly on Jabberjaw (1976) produced by Hanna-Barbera. Throughout the 1970s and 1980s, other voice-over credits included Yogi's Space Race, Buford and the Galloping Ghost, Shirt Tales, The Littles, The Smurfs, Sherlock Hound, Dumbo's Circus, Fraggle Rock: The Animated Series, DuckTales and The New Adventures of Winnie the Pooh, as well as numerous roles on the Disneyland Records read-along storybook recordings for Pinocchio, Bambi, Cinderella, Lady and the Tramp, Mary Poppins and Pete's Dragon. She has voiced the character of Princess Leia for the read-along storybook records of the original Star Wars trilogy.

Parris has also voiced Daisy Duck on two occasions: the 1983 Mickey Mouse theatrical featurette Mickey's Christmas Carol and at the beginning of a song called "Girl Talk" having a brief telephone conversation with Minnie Mouse (voiced by Russi Taylor) on the 1986 children's LP Totally Minnie. She is also known for having frequently voiced the character of Kanga on Winnie the Pooh TV series, read-along storybooks and video games.

She occasionally voiced the role of Mary Barclay on the Focus on the Family radio drama Adventures in Odyssey from 1989 to 1992 and again in 2002. Although she is primarily a behind-the-scenes actress, Parris has done a few on-camera appearances, including the made-for-television film Attack on Fear (1984), a 1985 episode of the prime time soap opera Knots Landing and several commercials. She has also provided vocals to live-action feature films such as Wolfen, Gor II, White Fang and Look Who's Talking Now.

== Filmography ==
=== Film ===
Year	Title	Voice role	Notes
1981	Wolfen	ESS voice	
1982	The American Adventure	Jane)	Short film (Epcot attraction, Walt Disney World)
1983	The Firesign Theatre Presents Hot Shorts	Various characters	
1983	Mickey's Christmas Carol	Daisy Duck	Short film
1985	Here Come the Littles	Helen Little	
1988	Outlaw of Gor	ADR voice	
1991	Rover Dangerfield	Farm animals	
1991	White Fang	ADR voice	
1993	Look Who's Talking Now	Dog / Wolf	
1993	Thumbelina: A Magical Story	Maya Garrison	English dub
1997	Cats Don't Dance	Additional voices	
2001	Mickey's Magical Christmas: Snowed in at the House of Mouse	Daisy Duck	Direct-to-video film (Mickey's Christmas Carol segment)
2005	Tarzan II	Additional voices	Direct-to-video film

=== Television ===
Year	Title	Role	Notes
1976	Jabberjaw	Shelly (voice)	16 episodes
1976	Famous Classic Tales	Amanda / Susie / Settler's Wife (voices)	Episode: "Davy Crockett on the Mississippi"
1977	CB Bears	Additional voices	13 episodes (Heyyy, It's the King! segment)
1978	The All New Popeye Hour	Additional voices	16 episodes (Dinky Dog segment)
1978–79	Yogi's Space Race	Cindy Mae / Rita (voices)	13 episodes
1978–79	Buford and the Galloping Ghost	Cindy Mae / Rita (voices)	13 episodes
1980	The Flintstones' New Neighbors	Oblivia Frankenstone (voice)	Television special
1980–81	The Fonz and the Happy Days Gang	Additional voices	
1981	Laverne & Shirley	Additional voices	
1982–83	Shirt Tales	Pammy Panda (voice)	23 episodes
1982	The Scooby & Scrappy-Doo/Puppy Hour	Additional voices	Episode: "The Puppy's Dangerous Mission"
1983	Super Friends	Additional voices	
1983–85	The Littles	Helen Little (voice)	29 episodes
1984	The Smurfs	Acorn (voice)	Episodes: "Papa's Worrywarts" / "The Pussywillow Pixies" / "Babes in Wartland"
1984	Attack on Fear	Bonnie	Television film
1984–85	Sherlock Hound	Mrs. Hudson (voice)	26 episodes (English dub)
1985	Smurfily Ever After	Acorn (voice)	Television special
1985	Knots Landing	East Bridge Player	Episode: "Vulnerable"
1985	Adventures of the Gummi Bears	Trina (voice)	Episode: "What You See is Me"
1985	The GLO Friends Save Christmas	Additional voices	Television special
1985–86	Dumbo's Circus	Lilli the Cat (voice)	82 episodes
1986	Donald, The Star-Struck Duck	Daisy Duck (voice)	Television special
1986	ABC Weekend Specials	Helen Little (voice)	Episode: "Liberty and the Littles"
1987	Fraggle Rock: The Animated Series	Ma Gorg (voice)	13 episodes
1987	Adventures of the Gummi Bears	Aquarianne (voice)	Episode: "Water Way to Go"
1987	DuckTales: The Treasure of the Golden Suns	Skittles (voice)	Television special
1987	DuckTales	Lucky the Lemming (voice)	Episode: "Scrooge's Pet"
1987	Pound Puppies	Lucy (voice)	Episode: "Where Do Puppies Come From?/Pups on the Loose"
1988–91	The New Adventures of Winnie the Pooh	Kanga / Christopher Robin's Mother (voices)	30 episodes
1988	The Adventures of Raggedy Ann & Andy	Additional voices	Episodes: "The Pixling Adventure" / "Raggedy's Christmas Adventure"
1989	Dink, the Little Dinosaur	Additional voices	
1991	Back to the Future	Additional voices	6 episodes
1992	Fievel's American Tails	Aunt Sophie (voice)	Episode: "Aunt Sophie's Visit"
1992	Tom & Jerry Kids Show	Additional voices	Episode: "Penthouse Mouse/12 Angry Sheep/The Ant Attack"
1993	Droopy, Master Detective	Additional voices	

== Audio recordings ==
=== Radio ===
Year	Title	Voice role	Episodes
1987	Adventures in Odyssey	Colleen Walker	"The New Kid in Town"
1989	Adventures in Odyssey	Mary Barclay	"Our Best Vacation Ever" / "The Visitors" / "The Barclay Family Ski Vacation"
1990	Adventures in Odyssey	Mary Barclay	"Two Sides to Every Story" / "Wishful Thinking" / "Thanksgiving at Home" / "The Adventure of the Adventure"
1991	Adventures in Odyssey	Mary Barclay	"The Vow" / "Where There's a Will..." / "The Meaning of Sacrifice"
1992	Adventures in Odyssey	Mary Barclay	"Modesty is the Best Policy"
2002	Adventures in Odyssey	Mary Barclay	"500"

=== Read-along storybooks and albums ===
Year	Title	Voice role
1976	Disney Little Golden Book & Record: Chicken Little	Chicken Little / Henny Penny
1976	Disney Little Golden Book & Record: Little Boy with a Big Horn	Neighbor / Ollie's Mother
1976	Disney Little Golden Book & Record: Rumpelstiltskin	The Girl
1976	Disney Little Golden Book & Record: The Large and Growly Bear	Bluebird, Rabbit
1976	Disney Little Golden Book & Record: The Poky Little Puppy	Mother / The First Little Puppy
1976	Disney Little Golden Book & Record: The Taxi That Hurried	Tom's Mother
1976	Disney Little Golden Book & Record: Thumbelina	Thumbelina / The Field Mouse
1977	Disney Read-Along: Walt Disney's Story of Pinocchio	The Blue Fairy
1977	Disney Read-Along: Walt Disney's Story of Peter Pan	Wendy Darling
1977	Disney Read-Along: Walt Disney's Story of Cinderella	Cinderella
1977	Disney Read-Along: Walt Disney's Story of Mary Poppins	Mary Poppins / Jane Banks
1977	Disney Read-Along: Walt Disney's Story of Dumbo	Mocking Elephant
1977	Disney Read-Along: Walt Disney's Story of Bambi	Young Bambi
1977	Disney Read-Along: The Rescuers	Bianca / Madame Medusa
1977	Disney Read-Along: Pete's Dragon	Nora / Miss Taylor
1978	Disney Read-Along: The Story of The Wizard of Oz	Dorothy / Good Witch of the North / Wicked Witch of the West
1978	Disney Read-Along: Walt Disney's Story of Bambi	Additional voices
1978	Fisher-Price Talk-to-Me Book: Dumbo's Day at the Circus	Snow White / Tania
1979	Disney Read-Along: Walt Disney's Story of Lady and the Tramp	Lady
1979	Disney Read-Along: Walt Disney's Story of Alice in Wonderland	Alice
1979	Disney Read-Along: Mother Goose Rhymes	Reader: Bobby Shaftoe / Bye Baby Bunting / Ding Dong Bell / Georgie Porgie / Hey Diddle Diddle / Jumping Joan / Little Betty Blue / Little Miss Muffet / Mary's Lamb / The Old Woman Who Lived in a Shoe / Rock-a-bye Baby / This Little Pig / Wee Willie Winkie
1979	Disney Read-Along: Star Wars	Princess Leia
1980	Disney Storyteller: Walt Disney's Story and Songs from Bambi	Young Bambi / Thumper
1980	Disney Storyteller: Walt Disney's Story and Songs from Cinderella	Cinderella / Anastasia
1980	Disney Read-Along: The Return of the King	Éowyn
1980	Disney Read-Along: Star Wars: The Empire Strikes Back	Princess Leia
1981	Disney Read-Along: The Fox and the Hound	Widow Tweed
1981	Disney Read-Along: Three Little Pigs	Mother Pig
1982	Disney Read-Along: Walt Disney's Story of 101 Dalmatians	Cruella de Vil / Anita / Perdita / Nanny
1983	Disney Read-Along: Star Wars: Return of the Jedi	Princess Leia / Mon Mothma
1983	Disney Read-Along: Star Wars: Return of the Jedi: The Ewoks Join the Fight	Princess Leia
1983	Disney Read-Along: Star Wars: The Further Adventures: Planet of the Hoojibs	Princess Leia
1983	Star Wars: Rebel Mission to Ord Mantell	Princess Leia
1983	The Story of WarGames: Missile Warning	NORAD Technician
1985	Disney Read-Along: Mickey Mouse and Friends: Double Birthday Surprise	Minnie Mouse
1986	The Talking Mickey Mouse Show: A Moose on the Loose	Mrs. North
1986	The Talking Mickey Mouse Show: A Mystery in Paris	Minnie Mouse
1986	The Talking Mickey Mouse Show: The Secret Island	Gold Gertie
1986	The Talking Mickey Mouse Show: Follow That Ghost!	Minnie Mouse
1986	The Talking Mickey Mouse Show: The Impossible Journey	Minnie Mouse
1986	Disney Read-Along: Disney Discovery Series: Colors & Shapes	Minnie Mouse / Flora
1986	Totally Minnie (Vinyl LP & CD)	Daisy Duck (Track #2: "Girl Talk")
1987	The Talking Mickey Mouse Show: Goofy's Last Waltz	Minnie Mouse
1989	Disney's The Many Adventures of Winnie the Pooh	Kanga
1989	Disney Read-Along: Disney's Winnie the Pooh and Tigger Too	Kanga
1989	Disney Read-Along: Disney's Winnie the Pooh and the Honey Tree	Kanga
1997	Disney Read-Along: Star Wars: A New Hope	Princess Leia
1997	Disney Read-Along: Star Wars: The Empire Strikes Back	Princess Leia
1997	Disney Read-Along: Star Wars: Return of the Jedi	Princess Leia

=== Educational films ===
Year	Title	Voice role	Notes
1978	Scooby-Doo: Black Explorers	Velma Dinkley	Hanna-Barbera Educational Filmstrips
1978	Scooby-Doo: The Signs of the Times	Velma Dinkley	Hanna-Barbera Educational Filmstrips
1978	Scooby-Doo: Let's Go to Press	Velma Dinkley	Hanna-Barbera Educational Filmstrips
1979	Jabberjaw: The Silent Hunters	Shelly	Hanna-Barbera Educational Filmstrips
1979	Jabberjaw: A Whale of a Tale	Shelly	Hanna-Barbera Educational Filmstrips
1979	Bamm-Bamm: Information Please	Pebbles Flintstone	Hanna-Barbera Educational Filmstrips
1979	Scooby-Doo: Help Wanted	Velma Dinkley	Hanna-Barbera Educational Filmstrips
1979	Back to School with Winnie the Pooh	Roo	The Walt Disney Company
1980	The Flintstones: A Weighty Problem	Pebbles Flintstone	Hanna-Barbera Educational Filmstrips
1980	The Flintstones: Fire Alarm	Pebbles Flintstone	Hanna-Barbera Educational Filmstrips
1980	The Flintstones: Fire Escape	Pebbles Flintstone	Hanna-Barbera Educational Filmstrips
1980	The Flintstones: Driving Guide	Pebbles Flintstone	Hanna-Barbera Educational Filmstrips
1980	Scooby-Doo: Skin Deep	Velma Dinkley	Hanna-Barbera Educational Filmstrips
1988	Manager of the Year: A Film About Effective Listening		Salenger Films
1989	Mickey's Safety Club: Playground Fun	Daisy Duck	The Walt Disney Company

=== Video games ===
Year	Title	Voice role
1995	Disney's Animated Storybook: Winnie the Pooh and the Honey Tree	Kanga
1995	Battle Beast	Additional voices
1996	Arcade America	Additional voices
1997	Ready for Math with Pooh	Kanga
1997	Ready to Read with Pooh	Kanga
1997	Herc's Adventures	Hera
