= Captain Caveman and the Teen Angels =

American animated series (1977–1980)

- Genre: Mystery; Superhero fiction Comedy
- Created by: Joe Ruby; Ken Spears
- Directed by: Charles A. Nichols; Ray Patterson (1978–80); Carl Urbano (1978–80)
- Voices of: Mel Blanc; Laurel Page; Marilyn Schreffler; Vernee Watson
- Narrated by: Gary Owens
- Theme music composer: Hoyt Curtin
- Ending theme: CB Bears theme (standalone version only)
- Composers: Hoyt Curtin and Ted Nichols
- Country of origin: United States
- Original language: English
- No. of series: 3
- No. of episodes: 20 (40 segments)

Production
- Executive producers: William Hanna; Joseph Barbera
- Producers: Iwao Takamoto; Don Jurwich (1978); Alex Lovy (1978); Art Scott (1978)
- Running time: 22 minutes (11 minutes per segment)
- Production company: Hanna-Barbera Productions

Original release
- Network: ABC
- Release: September 10, 1977 – June 21, 1980

Captain Caveman and the Teen Angels is an American animated mystery comedy series created by Joe Ruby and Ken Spears and produced by Hanna-Barbera Productions for ABC. The series aired during the network's Saturday morning schedule from September 10, 1977, to June 21, 1980.

In the series, the caveman superhero Captain Caveman is discovered within a block of ice and thawed out. He joins a trio of mystery-solving teenage girls in various missions. The hero has superhuman strength and flight, but his powers could fail him in inconvenient situations. Among the Teen Angels, Dee Dee Skyes is a Velma Dinkley-like amateur detective, Taffy Dare is the eccentric strategist who convinces the Captain to follow her instructions, and Brenda Chance is an easily-frightened girl who habitually serves as the victim in damsel in distress scenarios.

== Summary ==
The series follows the mystery-solving adventures of the Teen Angels—Brenda, Dee Dee and Taffy—and their friend Captain Caveman (or Cavey for short), a prehistoric caveman and superhero whom the girls discovered and thawed from a block of ice. The concept and general plot for the show was seen as a parody of Charlie's Angels (which also aired on ABC). The show also borrowed heavily from Scooby-Doo, another Hanna-Barbera show.

Captain Caveman's powers include super-strength, a variety of useful objects hidden inside his hair, and a club that allows him to fly and from which pop out different tools he uses to fight crime. His trademark and catchphrase is his battle cry of "Captain CAAAAAVEMAAAAAAANNNN!" Captain Caveman's voice was provided by Mel Blanc.

A total of forty 11-minute episodes ran for three seasons from 1977 to 1980: sixteen episodes were produced as segments of Scooby's All-Star Laff-A-Lympics in 1977, eight episodes were produced as segments of Scooby's All-Stars in 1978 and sixteen episodes were produced in 1980 when Captain Caveman and the Teen Angels were given their own half-hour show which combined new episodes and reruns from 1977 to 1978. Captain Caveman and the Teen Angels also participated in sporting competitions as part of "The Scooby Doobies" team on the half-hour Laff-A-Lympics segment. Like many animated series created by Hanna-Barbera in the 1970s, the show contained a laugh track, one of the last Hanna-Barbera productions to do so.

== Characters ==
The series features the following four main characters throughout its run:

- Captain Caveman, or "Cavey" for short (voiced by Mel Blanc), is the protagonist of the show, billed as "the world's first superhero." He is a caveman who is millennia old (his exact age is never disclosed, although in an episode he is carded by a doorman who is unsure Cavey is old enough to let in, to which Captain Caveman responds, "I'll be 2 million next month."). He can pull various objects from his long body hair that covers his body except for his nose, arms, and legs. He can also fly, but his flying power always seems to fail him at the worst possible moment. Sometimes he would attribute this mishap to an energy shortage ("Uh oh! Bad time for energy crisis." CRASH!), which was a reference to the gasoline rationing shortages of the late 1970s. He speaks in stereotypical "caveman-talk", replacing subject pronouns with their object equivalents and dropping articles such as "the" (for example, "Me know where bad guys are hiding."), and often mumbles the nonsense phrase "unga bunga". He also has a bad habit of occasionally eating large non-food objects in one gulp (e.g. bicycles, TV sets, safes, table lamps), and the Teen Angels occasionally have to stop him from eating potential clues that will help them to solve the mystery. Despite this, Cavey is ultimately loyal to them and he is very capable capturing culprits.
- Dee Dee Skyes (voiced by Vernee Watson) is the brains of the Teen Angels. Dee Dee and the rest of the Teen Angels found the frozen Captain Caveman and defrosted him. She wears her hair in an afro and usually wears a red turtleneck sweater with a blue skirt and red knee high boots. Both her dress style and her knack for solving mysteries make her similar to Velma Dinkley of Scooby-Doo fame, while she also bears a resemblance to Valerie from Josie and the Pussycats. She is misidentified as Brenda in the opening credits. Though some sources give the family name of both Dee Dee and her uncle Frank as "Sykes", their name is given as "Skyes" in the episode "The Fur Freight Fright", which featured Frank and his company "Skye's Furs". Her adaptation in the 2020 film Scoob! as Blue Falcon's assistant (voiced by Kiersey Clemons) also introduced herself as Dee Dee Skyes, and she is listed as such in the closing credits.
- Brenda Chance (voiced by Marilyn Schreffler) is a nervous brunette who is always scared of the demons, monsters and phantoms that she encounters and always tries to back out of a scary mystery similar to that of Shaggy Rogers, but always ends up getting captured or the short end of the stick. She wears a purple striped tank top and a pair of hot pink flared trousers with a white belt. She is misidentified as Dee Dee in the opening credits.
- Taffy Dare (voiced by Laurel Page) is the blonde member and leader of the group, renowned for her cry of "Zowie!" whenever she comes up with a plan (or "Another Daffy Taffy Plan" as Brenda and Cavey would call it) to catch the culprits, has a distinct, flirtatious, childlike persona and a New York-influenced/Southern accent. In spite of her usually zany plans and ditziness, Taffy is actually very capable and clever. She has the ability to seduce Caveman into acting as bait for her plans to capture the culprit. She wears a green dress with matching shoes. It is revealed that Captain Caveman has a crush on her and vice versa.

== Opening and closing credits ==
"Set free by the Teen Angels from his prehistoric block of glacier ice, comes the world's first superhero, Captain Caveman! Now the constant companion to the Teen Angels—Brenda, Dee Dee and Taffy—in their hilarious, and sometimes scary mystery missions. Get ready for Captain Caveman and the Teen Angels!"

— Opening narration by Gary Owens.

Each episode opens with voice-over narration by Gary Owens explaining how Captain Caveman was "set free by the Teen Angels from his prehistoric block of glacier ice."

The music heard in the closing credits is the CB Bears theme. After the first three screens, the end credit roll is from the original two-hour version of Scooby's All-Star Laff-A-Lympics.

== Broadcast history ==
Captain Caveman and the Teen Angels was broadcast in these following formats on ABC:

- Scooby's All-Star Laff-A-Lympics (September 10, 1977 – September 2, 1978)
- Scooby's All-Stars (September 9, 1978 – September 8, 1979)
- Captain Caveman and the Teen Angels (March 8, 1980 – June 21, 1980)

Broadcast schedules (all EDT):

- September 10, 1977 – July 1978; Saturdays 9:00 – 11:00 a.m.
- July 1978 – September 2, 1978; Saturdays 9:30 – 11:30 a.m.
- September 9, 1978 – November 1978; Saturdays 10:00 – 11:30 a.m.
- November 1978 – May 1979; Saturdays 8:00 – 9:30 a.m.
- May 1979 – September 8, 1979; Saturdays 8:30 – 10:00 a.m.
- March 8, 1980 – June 21, 1980; Saturdays 11:30 – 12:00 noon

== Episodes ==
=== Season 1 – Scooby's All Star Laff-A-Lympics (1977) ===
No. overall	No. in season	Title	Original release date
1	1	"The Kooky Case of the Cryptic Keys"	September 10, 1977
While on a road trip, Captain Caveman and the Teen Angels are given a mysterious key by a stranger.
2	2	"The Mixed Up Mystery of Deadman's Reef"	September 17, 1977
While at the beach with some friends, Captain Caveman and the Teen Angels see a ship mysteriously vanish.
3	3	"What a Flight for a Fright"	September 24, 1977
At the airport, some jewels are stolen by a mysterious figure.
4	4	"The Creepy Case of the Creaky Charter Boat"	October 1, 1977
On a charter boat, Captain Caveman and the Teen Angels are chatting with a friend whose father is being honored for his role in a play when suddenly the lights go out and a necklace is stolen.
5	5	"Big Scare in the Big Top"	October 8, 1977
At a circus being haunting by a phantom, tigers are disappearing. Captain Caveman and the Teen Angels investigate.
6	6	"Double Dribble Riddle"	October 15, 1977
The Central City Kings have disappeared due to a panther.
7	7	"The Crazy Case of the Tell-Tale Tape"	October 22, 1977
The television station KXXX is taken off the air when a criminal cuts its antenna.
8	8	"The Creepy Claw Caper"	October 29, 1977
A villain, Claw, uses an aging gun to turn a rock star into an old man.
9	9	"Cavey and the Kabuta Clue"	November 5, 1977
When a mummy comes to life and kidnaps an archeologist, Captain Caveman and the Teen Angels investigate.
10	10	"Cavey and the Weirdo Wolfman"	November 12, 1977
Captain Caveman and the Teen Angels go skiing with their friend, a prince of a small country. When a scepter is stolen by a Snowwolfman, they investigate.
11	11	"The Disappearing Elephant Mystery"	November 19, 1977
In India, when a Royal White Elephant is stolen by an evil sorcerer, Captain Caveman and the Teen Angels investigate.
12	12	"The Fur Freight Fright"	November 26, 1977
Captain Caveman and the Teen Angels are assisting Dee Dee's uncle, Frank Skyes, with a fur delivery. When the furs disappear, they investigate.
13	13	"Ride 'Em Caveman"	December 3, 1977
In Wyoming, rumors of a horse that is possessed by a demon are rampant. And they seem to be true. Captain Caveman and the Teen Angels have arrived to investigate. During their investigation, a bank robbery occurs.
14	14	"The Strange Case of the Creature from Space"	December 10, 1977
Captain Caveman and the Teen Angels go to a research facility after they spot an alien spacecraft landing there. They discover that an alien robot supposedly stole a top secret energy source.
15	15	"The Mystery Mansion Mix-Up"	December 17, 1977
Captain Caveman and the Teen Angels got to Farthington Mansion with Taffy's Aunt Gladys to see a magic show. When some jewels are stolen, Captain Caveman and the Teen Angels investigate.
16	16	"Playing Footsie with Bigfoot"	December 24, 1977
In Oregon, when the star athlete of a sports team is kidnapped, Captain Caveman and the Teen Angels investigate. Very soon, they have found Juice Brenner (wordplay on the name of a popular athlete at the time, Bruce Jenner). Or have they? He is acting strangely.

=== Season 2 – Scooby's All Stars (1978) ===
No. overall	No. in season	Title	Original release date
17	1	"Disco Cavey"	September 9, 1978
When jewels are stolen at a disco on the RMS Queen Mary, Captain Caveman and the Teen Angels investigate. The creepy monster seems to have the Teen Angels outfoxed.
18	2	"Muscle-Bound Cavey"	September 16, 1978
When a champion wrestler is kidnapped, Captain Caveman and the Teen Angels investigate.
19	3	"Cavey's Crazy Car Caper"	September 23, 1978
When a new car is stolen, Captain Caveman and the Teen Angels investigate.
20	4	"Cavey's Mexicali 500"	September 30, 1978
When four Aztec calendars are stolen, Captain Caveman and the Teen Angels decide to investigate.
21	5	"Wild West Cavey"	October 7, 1978
While at a Wild West show in Dodge City, some money disappears from a saddle bag that two bandits who were really actors pretended to steal from a stagecoach that Captain Caveman and the Teen Angels were riding.
22	6	"Cavey's Winter Carnival Caper"	October 14, 1978
Captain Caveman and the Teen Angels investigate when their friend, figure skater Karenia Mikovich, disappears.
23	7	"Cavey's Fashion Fiasco"	October 21, 1978
At a fashion show, three models disappear.
24	8	"Cavey's Missing Missile Miss-tery"	October 28, 1978
Captain Caveman and the Teen Angels decide to investigate when a missile launch they have been watching in the Grand Canyon, where they had previously competed in the Laff-A-Lympics, goes awry.

=== Season 3 (1980) ===
No. overall	No. in season	Title	Original release date
25	1	"The Scarifying Seaweed Secret"	March 8, 1980
Mrs. Snowden is supposed to be the heir to a fortune. But she must stay on the island, or her relatives will inherit the fortune. Captain Caveman and the Teen Angels are called in to investigate when the relatives start disappearing thanks to a mysterious sea creature.
26	2	"The Dummy"	March 15, 1980
When some jewels are stolen, a ventriloquist whom Captain Caveman and the Teen Angels had been watching the night before is immediately suspected by a policeman.
27	3	"Cavey and the Volcanic Villain"	March 22, 1980
In Hawaii, a marriage between two lovers from two families who had been enemies for many years is threatened when a sacred pearl disappears. Captain Caveman and the Teen Angels, who are friends with the bride, investigate.
28	4	"Prehistoric Panic"	March 29, 1980
Captain Caveman and the Teen Angels travel back in time to meet Captain Caveman's father, the chief of Cavey's tribe. Cavey soon learns that his father's position is threatened by the Mellog, an evil creature that Captain Caveman's father defeated long ago. Captain Caveman and the Teen Angels investigate when the statue of the Mellog comes to life.
29	5	"Cavey and the Baffling Buffalo Man"	April 5, 1980
A Native American park ranger asks Captain Caveman and the Teen Angels for their help in finding his stolen car and the Buffalo Man who stole it.
30	6	"Dragonhead"	April 12, 1980
While on the way to a Chinese New Year festival in San Francisco, Captain Caveman and the Teen Angels save a truck driver working for a fortune cookie factory. The CEO, Mr. Chin, has been having problems with his business since a masked criminal named Dragonhead showed up. Captain Caveman finds the truck. They notice that the fortune cookies were stolen but not the fortunes. Captain Caveman and the Teen Angels investigate.
31	7	"Cavey and the Murky Mississippi Mystery"	April 19, 1980
Captain Caveman and the Teen Angels go on a cruise on a riverboat on the Mississippi River. While there, some nuclear material disappears in the river. Captain Caveman and the Teen Angels investigate and discover a river creature.
32	8	"Old Cavey in New York"	April 26, 1980
In New York City, Captain Caveman and the Teen Angels witness a blackout. They soon discover that the gold from the International Gold Exchange has been stolen at the same time.
33	9	"Cavey and the Albino Rhino"	May 3, 1980
Captain Caveman and the Teen Angels are the first people to see a rare albino rhino at the wildlife park. A little while later, the albino rhino is stolen.
34	10	"Kentucky Cavey"	May 10, 1980
Taffy Dare wants to help her uncle who is on the verge of a foreclosure unless his horse wins the Kentucky Derby. When the horse is stolen, Captain Caveman and the Teen Angels investigate.
35	11	"Cavey Goes to College"	May 17, 1980
Captain Caveman and the Teen Angels watch the first appearance of a special robot which suddenly disappears.
36	12	"The Haunting of Hog's Hollow"	May 24, 1980
At the Hog Hollow Country Fair, something is wrong with country music singer Jasper Joe Jeeter's voice. Captain Caveman and the Teen Angels investigate when Jasper disappears on a ferris wheel.
37	13	"The Legend of Devil's Run"	May 31, 1980
Dee Dee's uncle, Winton, invites Captain Caveman and the Teen Angels to see the reopening of the Devil's Run Railway when a freight car full of silver disappears the same way a munitions car disappeared during the Civil War. Captain Caveman and the Teen Angels investigate and find out that the legend of the Civil War ghost said to have pulled off the robbery.
38	14	"The Mystery of the Meandering Mummy"	June 7, 1980
When a mummy comes to life and steals an Ancient Egyptian ruby from Brenda's uncle, Jonathan, Captain Caveman and the Teen Angels investigate.
39	15	"The Old Caveman and the Sea"	June 14, 1980
While on vacation in Miami, Captain Caveman and the Teen Angels witness a shark attack. They soon discover that a treasure has been stolen. Captain Caveman and the Teen Angels investigate.
40	16	"Lights, Camera... Cavey!"	June 21, 1980
While on a tour of the movie studio, a Phantom makes two actresses appear old. Captain Caveman and the Teen Angels investigate.

== Cast ==
- Mel Blanc as Captain Caveman
- Laurel Page as Taffy Dare
- Marilyn Schreffler as Brenda Chance
- Vernee Watson-Johnson as Dee Dee Skyes
- Gary Owens as Narrator

== Later appearances ==
=== The Flintstone Comedy Show (1980–82) ===
In November 1980, Captain Caveman began to star in segments of his own on The Flintstone Comedy Show, one of many spin-offs of Hanna-Barbera's popular prime-time show The Flintstones, often in a role similar to that of Superman. Captain Caveman worked at The Daily Granite newspaper with Wilma Flintstone and Betty Rubble. His "secret identity" was Chester the office boy. To disguise himself as Chester, Captain Caveman wore a pair of glasses and a tie. Despite the simplicity of his disguise, he required a coat rack and an elaborate transformation sequence to become Captain Caveman.

=== The Flintstone Kids (1986–88) ===
In 1986, Captain Caveman appeared in a backup segment of The Flintstone Kids called Captain Caveman and Son with his son Cavey Jr. (voiced by Charlie Adler). In this case he appeared on a show-within-a-show that the younger versions of Fred, Barney, Wilma, and Betty enjoyed watching; the Captain's mumbled "unga bunga" became a catchphrase that the kids would shout before watching each "episode" of the show. The show would involve a lesson the Flintstone kids were trying to learn in the prologue. He had no secret identity.

=== Hanna-Barbera Cinematic Universe ===
Captain Caveman and Dee Dee Skyes appeared in the 2020 computer-animated Scooby-Doo film Scoob!, with Captain Caveman voiced by Tracy Morgan and Dee Dee voiced by Kiersey Clemons. Dee Dee appears as the pilot of the Falcon Fury and assistant of the Blue Falcon. Captain Caveman is an inhabitant of a prehistoric ecosystem under Messick Mountain and part of a tribe with long body hair like him and is capable of speaking proper English.

Captain Caveman appears in the 2021 film Space Jam: A New Legacy. His design is the same as in Scoob! Captain Caveman is seen watching the basketball game between the Tune Squad and the Goon Squad while swinging from the overhead power line that Magilla Gorilla was riding his unicycle on.

=== Other appearances ===
- A very similar pair of characters, the Slag Brothers, made appearances in the earlier Hanna-Barbera series, Wacky Races. They served as the inspiration for Captain Caveman.
- Captain Caveman later appeared in the Harvey Birdman, Attorney at Law episode "The Evolutionary War", with Captain Caveman voiced by Chris Edgerly and Cavey Jr. voiced by Maurice LaMarche. Captain Caveman turns to Harvey Birdman to represent him when Cavey Jr.'s school would not teach evolution.
- Captain Caveman appeared in the Robot Chicken episode "Ban on the Fun", voiced by Breckin Meyer. In a segment that parodies Laff-A-Lympics in the style of the Munich massacre, Captain Caveman and Shaggy Rogers confront Daisy Mayhem and the former blows her up with the "wrong club".
- In a Halloween-themed episode of Homestar Runner, Homsar is dressed up in a Captain Caveman-like costume. During the episode, he exclaims "DaAaAaA! I'm the Captain Caveman of the graveyard train!"
- In the Family Guy episode "Perfect Castaway", Peter Griffin says how much he misses Captain Caveman, and vows that he will see him again once he gets off the deserted island he is trapped.
- Captain Caveman makes a cameo appearance in an episode of Adventure Time, where he is seen as a stuffed doll in Finn's room.
- Captain Caveman appeared in the Scooby-Doo! Mystery Incorporated episode, "Mystery Solvers Club State Finals", voiced by Jim Cummings. He and the Teen Angels appear alongside other Hanna-Barbera detective teams from Jabberjaw, Speed Buggy, and The Funky Phantom in a fever dream of Scooby-Doo's.
- In Scooby-Doo! Mask of the Blue Falcon, a person cosplaying as Captain Caveman makes an appearance in a Hanna-Barbera-themed convention.
- Captain Caveman is seen briefly in the background of South Park - Imaginationland: The Movie (2008). He is seen amongst a plethora of other imaginary and cartoon characters as they are being attacked by terrorists.
- Captain Caveman, alongside Cavey Jr. and the Teen Angels, appeared in Jellystone!, with Captain Caveman voiced by Jim Conroy, Cavey Jr. voiced by Dana Snyder, Dee Dee Sykes voiced by Niccole Thurman, Taffy Dare voiced by Grace Helbig, and Brenda Chance voiced by Georgie Kidder. The Teen Angels work as reporters and are young adults. As a result, they are referred to as the "Young Adult Angels". It is later revealed in "Better Off Fred" that Captain Caveman is actually Barney Rubble who grew his hair out while frozen in ice.
- Captain Caveman appeared in the Yabba Dabba Dinosaurs episode "Caveman Begins" (2020), voiced by independent animator Tom Megalis.
- Captain Caveman appeared in the 2021 special Scooby-Doo, Where Are You Now!
- Captain Caveman appears as a mascot display and as two costumes worn by individuals in the Crystal Cave in Velma season 1, episode 5 on HBO Max. He is also the idol of worship for a cult. Meanwhile, the Teen Angels is the name of an all-girl rock band according to posters in Daphne's room.

== Comic books ==
- Captain Caveman and the Teen Angels appeared in all 13 issues of Laff-A-Lympics (Marvel Comics, 1978–79) as members of the Scooby Doobies.
- Cavey and the Angels appeared in the first issue of the short-lived Hanna-Barbera TV Stars (Marvel, August 1978).
- Cavey and the Angels team up with Mystery, Inc. in Scooby-Doo #9 (Marvel, February 1979).
- In 2018, Captain Caveman and the Teen Angels (excluding Brenda) appeared in a backup story in the DC comic Aquaman/Jabberjaw Special #1. In this story, the wizard Shazam transports the powerful hominid from prehistoric times to the present to settle an argument with the Spectre about whether heroism is strictly a trait of modern man or early man.

== Home media ==
=== United Kingdom VHS releases ===
VHS title	Release date	Episodes
The Flintstones Comedy Show (VC1084)	13 July 1987	"Dino's Girl", "A Rocks-Pox on You", "In Tune with Terror", "Punk Rock", "Rockjaw Rides Again"
The Flintstone Kids (VC1120)	7 November 1988	"The Flintstone Fake Ache", "Worldwar Flea", "I Was a Teenage Grown-Up", "Anything You Can Do I Can Do Betty", "Dressed Up Dino", "Day of the Villains", "Rocky's Rocky Road", "The Butcher Shoppe", "Grime and Punishment", "Better Buddy Blues", "Freddy's Mechanical Dog", "The Cream-Pier Strikes Back"
Captain Caveman and the Teen Angels: Bumper Edition (VA30711)	13 October 1997	"Playing Footsie with Bigfoot", "Cavey and the Volcanic Villain", "Prehistoric Panic", "Cavey and the Baffling Buffalo Man", "Old Cavey in New York", "Kentucky Cavey", "Cavey Goes to College", "The Old Caveman and the Sea", "Disco Cavey", "Musclebound Cavey", "Cavey's Crazy Car Caper", "Wild West Cavey", "The Dummy"

=== DVD ===
On July 23, 2013, Warner Archive Collection released the complete series as a manufacture-on-demand (MOD) DVD.
