= Jabberjaw =

American animated television series (1976)

- Genre: Comedy; Mystery
- Created by: Joe Ruby; Ken Spears
- Directed by: Charles A. Nichols
- Voices of: Frank Welker; Tommy Cook; Barry Gordon; Julie McWhirter; Patricia Parris
- Music by: Hoyt Curtin
- Opening theme: "Jabberjaw" (Jabberjaw and The Neptunes)
- Ending theme: "Jabberjaw" (instrumental)
- Country of origin: United States
- Original language: English
- No. of seasons: 1
- No. of episodes: 16

Production
- Executive producers: William Hanna; Joseph Barbera
- Producer: Alex Lovy
- Running time: 23 minutes
- Production company: Hanna-Barbera Productions

Original release
- Network: ABC
- Release: September 11 – December 18, 1976

Jabberjaw is an American animated television series created by Joe Ruby and Ken Spears and produced by Hanna-Barbera which aired 16 original episodes on ABC from September 11 to December 18, 1976. Reruns continued on ABC until September 3, 1978.

== Premise ==
Jabberjaw, a 15 ft (4.6 m) long amphibious great white shark, is the drummer and mascot for The Neptunes, a rock group consisting of himself and four humans (Biff, Shelly, Bubbles and Clamhead) who live in an underwater civilization. The Neptunes travel to various underwater cities where they encounter and deal with assorted megalomaniacs and supervillains who want to conquer the undersea world.

Like a great deal of Hanna-Barbera's 1970s output, the format and writing for Jabberjaw was similar to that for Scooby-Doo, Josie and the Pussycats and Speed Buggy. The show also drew inspiration (in the use of a shark as a character) from the overall shark mania of the mid-1970s caused by the then-recent film Jaws. It also shared The Flintstones' penchant for making use of puns as the names of locations, people, etc., in this case, ocean-themed puns (such as "Aqualaska" instead of Alaska). Every episode ended with a musical chase sequence where Jabberjaw and the gang would run from the villains, performing zany cartoon antics in order to escape while a song by The Neptunes played in the background.

== Characters ==
Jabberjaw and The Neptunes. Counterclockwise: Jabberjaw (drums), Bubbles (keyboard), Biff (guitar), Shelly (vocals and tambourine) and Clamhead (bass).

- Jabberjaw (voiced by Frank Welker impersonating Curly Howard) is an amphibious, Brooklyn-accented anthropomorphic great white shark with mannerisms similar to Curly of The Three Stooges. Jabberjaw found it hard to get respect in a society where "shark ejectors" (robots that would guard various buildings or cities from sharks entering) were commonplace. These robots, as well as unpleasant treatment from others, frequently prompt him to utter some variation of his catchphrase (borrowed from the comedian Rodney Dangerfield): "I don't get no respect!" He has the unique ability to change his shape or adapt himself to act like various objects such as a trampoline, parachute, jack, throw rug, etc., either to get himself and the gang out of a jam, or just to hide.
- Biff (voiced by Tommy Cook) is an athletic, handsome, brown-haired young man who is the band's guitar player and level-headed leader who books all the gigs. In many episodes, his hair is drawn black. His main catchphrase is "Jumpin' jellyfish!" (occasionally, "Hoppin' halibut!")
- Shelly (voiced by Patricia Parris) is a dark-haired young woman who plays tambourine and sings vocals for The Neptunes. She is beautiful and intelligent, but haughty, vain, and abrasive (like Josie and the Pussycats' Alexandra) and considers herself to be the star of the band. While she holds a great deal of disdain for Jabberjaw (or "Blubberhead" as she calls him), she does have some grudging fondness for him deep down and occasionally shows it.
- Bubbles (voiced by Julie McWhirter) is a young woman with blonde curly hair who plays keyboard for The Neptunes. She is extremely ditzy and dimwitted, has a cute giggle, similar to Josie and the Pussycats' Melody. Shelly sometimes nicknames her "Ding-a-Ling" or "Bubblehead". Whenever she volunteers to help, she usually ends up messing it up.
- Clamhead (voiced by Barry Gordon) is a tall, slim and red-haired young man who plays bass for The Neptunes and is Jabberjaw's best friend. His catchphrases are crying out "Abba-abba-abba!" and "Wowee-wow-wow-wow!" (or some variation, commonly featuring the word "zowie") whenever he gets excited.

== Broadcast history ==
Sixteen 30-minute episodes of Jabberjaw were produced, which aired on ABC Saturday Morning from September 11, 1976, to September 3, 1977, and rebroadcast for a second season of reruns on Sunday Morning from September 11, 1977, to September 3, 1978. In the 1980s, repeats resurfaced as part of USA Cartoon Express on USA Network, in the 1990s on Cartoon Network and in the 2000s on Boomerang. Reruns of the series aired on Discovery Family from September 14, 2024 to June 26, 2025. This is one of a number of shows made before the mid-1980s seen on the Cartoon Network and Boomerang to have been taken from PAL prints.

Like many animated series created by Hanna-Barbera in the 1970s, the show contained a laugh track created by the studio.

Broadcast schedules (all EDT):

- September 11, 1976 – November 27, 1976, ABC Saturday 9:00-9:30 AM
- December 4, 1976 – September 3, 1977, ABC Saturday 8:30-9:00 AM
- September 11, 1977 – September 3, 1978, ABC Sunday 10:30-11:00 AM

== Episodes ==
No.	Title	Original release date	Prod. code
1	"Dr. Lo Has Got to Go"	September 11, 1976	84-1
Jabber and the gang have to stop the evil Dr. Lo from unleashing his Gorgon on the city of Aquahama.
2	"There's No Place Like Outer Space"	September 18, 1976	84-2
After Biff gets them kicked out for a publicity stunt, aliens land in the undersea city of Hydrostan. It is up to Jabber and the gang to stop their invasion.
3	"Atlantis, Get Lost"	September 25, 1976	84-4
Jabber and the gang get mixed-up in Dorsal's plan to overthrow the queen of Atlantis and become king himself.
4	"Run, Jabber, Run"	October 2, 1976	84-3
Jabber competes in the Undersea Olympics against a robot in order to unmask Z, the leader of a worldwide criminal organization.
5	"The Sourpuss Octopus"	October 9, 1976	84-5
Jabber and the gang accidentally join Professor Acosta's expedition to find the treasure of Panaqua, and have to protect him from the villainous Octopus.
6	"Hang On to Your Hat, Jabber"	October 16, 1976	84-6
The Brotherhood of Evil threatens the undersea world when it learns that the Power Helmet, invented by Professor Ortega, grants its bearer's every wish.
7	"The Great Shark Switch"	October 23, 1976	84-7
Thanks to Jabber's blundering, the Neptunes are suspected of assisting Commander Shark, who wants to take over the undersea world with his army of henchmen-turned-into-sharks, in kidnapping the Ambassador of Aquatania, so Jabberjaw must prove their innocence. When the gang tries to rescue the ambassador, Shelly and Clamhead are transformed into sharks themselves.
8	"Claim-Jumped Jabber"	October 30, 1976	84-8
The evil Coldfinger is after all the richest mines in Aqualaska. When Jabberjaw gets in the way, Coldfinger plots to put him on ice.
9	"Ali Jabber and the Secret Thieves"	November 6, 1976	84-9
Jabber and The Neptunes, touring the undersea kingdom of Hydrabia, meet Volton, an evil mass of energy who lives inside the magic Electrolamp.
10	"Help, Help, It's the Phantom of the Kelp"	November 13, 1976	84-10
The Phantom, with the aid of a powerful growth ray, plans to raise an army of ferocious prehistoric plants to make the Aqua International Corporation bow to his demands.
11	"No Helpin' the Sculpin"	November 20, 1976	84-11
Jabber and The Neptunes encounter the sinister Sculpin, who has stolen an unfinished time machine from the brilliant Professor Thorstein. When Clamhead gets mistaken for Thorstein and abducted, it is up to Jabber and the gang to rescue their friend and call a timeout on the Sculpin's schemes.
12	"The Bermuda Triangle Tangle"	November 25, 1976	84-12
Jabberjaw and The Neptunes accidentally go through the Bermuda Triangle and are taken prisoner by Sorceress Madame Sargasso. Note: Telecast at noon (ET) on a Thursday, as part of ABC's Thanksgiving Funshine Festival.
13	"Malice in Aqualand"	November 27, 1976	84-13
While participating in a rodeo at Aqualand's theme land Westernland, Jabberjaw sees Dr. Cybron's henchmen kidnap the Rajah and replace him with a robot duplicate. He tells The Neptunes about their plot and Dr. Cybron tries to silence them by sending a runaway stagecoach over a cliff. When that plot fails, his henchmen capture Bubbles and send a duplicate of her to capture the others. The group rescues Bubbles and the Rajah and discovers that Dr. Cybron himself is a robot.
14	"The Fast Paced Chase Race"	December 4, 1976	84-14
The Neptunes try to win the top spot in the Petrolaqua Trans-Marine Race while attempting to foil the evil plans of Dr. Robek to control the undersea world's oil supply.
15	"The Piranha Plot"	December 11, 1976	84-16
Biff books the group on a tanker to Amsteraqua after another gig falls through, this being the cheapest way to go straight there. The Piranha has designs on ruling the Underwater States of America and captures the tanker for its load of special rocket fuel. The Neptunes scuttle the Piranha's rocket, practically dismantling the control center and messing with the rocket's fuel delivery system. Jabber manages to accidentally launch the rocket to a different destination with its cargo of sleep dust.
16	"There's No Heel Like El Eel"	December 18, 1976	84-15
The eerie El Eel threatens to turn the entire undersea world to stone, and there is only one guy who can stop him: the great El Jabbo.

== Other appearances ==
A rebooted Jabberjaw interacts with Aquaman, from the Aquaman/Jabberjaw Special #1

- Jabberjaw guest starred as an announcer or referee in the episodes "Mexico and England" (1977), "India and Israel" (1977), "Africa and California" (1977), "New York and Turkey" (1978) and "Louisiana and Atlantis" (1978) on Scooby's All-Star Laff-A-Lympics.
- Jabberjaw made a special guest appearance at a celebrity roast honoring Fred Flintstone on the TV special Hanna-Barbera's All-Star Comedy Ice Revue (1978). In this appearance, Jabberjaw is voiced by Don Messick.
- Jabberjaw co-starred in the series Yogi's Space Race (1978) in which he participated in intergalactic racing competitions with Yogi Bear, Huckleberry Hound and other characters; his racing partner was a lazy bloodhound named Buford (from The Buford Files of Buford and the Galloping Ghost) and their race ship contained a track on which Buford ran to increase speed. Jabber and Buford were both voiced by Frank Welker.
- Jabberjaw also appeared in the medium of comic books. He made appearances in Laff-A-Lympics issues #8 through #12 published by Marvel Comics in 1978–79. He also appeared in Hanna-Barbera Presents Superstar Olympics (issue #6) published by Archie Comics in 1996 and Cartoon Network Presents Jabberjaw! Speed Buggy! Captain Caveman! (issue #23) published by DC Comics in 1999. Charlton Comics was originally set to publish a Jabberjaw comic series in 1977, but it was cancelled. In France, Norbert Fersen adapted the show into a comic strip under its French translated name Mantalo and featured in the magazines Télé Junior, Télé Parade and Télé BD (1978–81).
- Jabberjaw and Shelly starred in two 1979 educational filmstrips – The Silent Hunters and A Whale of a Tale – as part of the Hanna-Barbera Educational Filmstrips series distributed in classroom environments.
- Jabberjaw made a cameo appearance in the episode "Goodbye, Mr. Chump" on Yogi's Treasure Hunt (1987), voiced again by Frank Welker.
- Jabberjaw and The Neptunes appeared on Cartoon Network Groovies in a music video set to Pain's "Jabberjaw (Running Underwater)" (1999) in which they are portrayed as a ska band with the group dressed in modern clothing.
- Jabberjaw appeared on the TV special Night of the Living Doo (2001) trying to take out Scooby-Doo and the Mystery Inc. gang so he can finally get his respect. Frank Welker reprised the role of Jabberjaw.
- Jabberjaw and The Neptunes made sporadic appearances on Harvey Birdman, Attorney at Law in the episodes "Shoyu Weenie" (2002), "The Dabba Don" (2002), "Back to the Present" (2004), "Peanut Puberty" (2004), "Identity Theft" (2005), "Juror in Court" (2007) and "The Death of Harvey" (2007). Frank Welker reprised the role of Jabberjaw and voiced Biff while Clamhead was later voiced by Steve Blum.
- Jabberjaw made a cameo, sitting in the movie theater with other Hanna-Barbera/Cartoon Network/Warner Bros. characters on the opening Cartoon Network logo from The Powerpuff Girls Movie (2002).
- Jabberjaw made a cameo appearance in the Johnny Bravo episode "Johnny Bravo Goes to Hollywood" (2004).
- Jabberjaw appeared on Sealab 2021 in the episode "Return of Marco" (2004). He was one of many sharks impaled with spears by an aquatic tribe of cave dwellers.
- Jabberjaw and The Neptunes appeared on Scooby-Doo! Mystery Incorporated in the episode "Mystery Solvers Club State Finals" (2011) alongside other Hanna-Barbera mystery teams in a fever dream of Scooby-Doo's. Frank Welker reprised the role of Jabberjaw.
- Jabberjaw made a cameo appearance in a 2012 MetLife commercial entitled "Everyone".
- Jabberjaw and The Neptunes appeared in the Robot Chicken episode "Things Look Bad for the Streepster" (2018) with Jabberjaw voiced by Tom Sheppard. Jabberjaw goes on vacation to Amity Island and runs into the cast of Jaws, only to be killed by them. Bruce takes Jabberjaw's place in The Neptunes.
- A less cartoonish depiction of Jabberjaw and the Neptunes starred in a crossover with Aquaman, Aquaman/Jabberjaw Special #1, published by DC Comics. In the comic, Jabberjaw and the Neptunes hail from 60 years in the future, where Aqualand is depicted as a society where humans and sea creatures live alongside each other, though sea creatures frequently are discriminated against. Aquaman teams up with Jabberjaw and the Neptunes to battle a villain who takes up the identity of Aquaman's nemesis, Ocean Master, and sends brainwashed killer sharks back in time to prevent Aqualand from being established. After defeating him, Aquaman encourages the band to use their music to mend relations between sea creatures and mankind. Aquaman is also dismayed to see in the future where he is depicted similarly to how he is in the Super Friends cartoon.
- Jabberjaw and The Neptunes appeared in the Wacky Races episode "Far Away In Old Bombay" (2018).
- Jabberjaw appears in the end credits of the film Scoob! as a new recruit of the Blue Falcon's Falcon Force, and he appears to be gender-swapped. He/She was originally planned to have a larger role but the concept was removed from the final film.
- Jabberjaw appeared in the 2021 film Space Jam: A New Legacy. He is seen watching the basketball game between the Tune Squad and the Goon Squad.
- A genderbend version of Jabberjaw is featured in the series Jellystone! (2021–2025), voiced by Niccole Thurman. She is one of Magilla Gorilla's employees in his haberdasher along with a genderbent version of Loopy De Loop. In the season 3 episode "The Floodgates of Love", the original male Jabberjaw shows up where he is identified as Jabberjaw Sr. (voiced by C. H. Greenblatt) and is the father of the female Jabberjaw. The Neptunes also make appearances. Biff is more tanned and has lighter brown hair in this version. Shelly makes more appearances as a cashier at the Barbera's grocery store.
- Jabberjaw appeared in the 2021 special Scooby-Doo, Where Are You Now!, voiced again by Frank Welker.
- Jabberjaw appeared in the Family Guy episode, "Lawyer Guy" (2022). He appears on a selfie with Peter Griffin's friends and Peter's backyard neighbor Brick Baker.
- Jabberjaw made a cameo appearance at a water fountain in the Teen Titans Go! episode "Warner Bros. 100th Anniversary", voiced by Eric Bauza.

== Merchandise ==
In 1977–78, Rand McNally released two coloring books (Jabberjaw and The Neptunes and Jabberjaw Does It Again), a story book (Jabberjaw Out West by Jean Lewis, illustrated by Jim Franzen) and a read & color book (Jabberjaw and the Rustlers).

Other merchandise in the late 1970s–early 1980s included a lunchbox and thermos, iron-on transfers, jigsaw puzzles, Presto Magix, bubble maker set, a school tablet, Avon pendant, a plush toy and Hanna-Barbera Marineland Jabberjaw picture viewer.

In 2005, a Jabberjaw Wacky Wobbler bobblehead figure was released by Funko.

== Home media ==
An 85-minute videocassette of Jabberjaw containing four episodes ("Dr. Lo Has Got to Go", "There's No Place Like Outer Space", "The Sourpuss Octopuss" and "The Great Shark Switch") was released by Worldvision Home Video on July 28, 1988.

The complete series was released on DVD by the Warner Archive Collection in February 2011.

== See also ==
- List of works produced by Hanna-Barbera
- List of Hanna-Barbera characters
