= Taff =

Taff or TAFF may refer to:

- River Taff, a large river in Wales
- Taff (TV series), a German tabloid news programme
- Trans-Atlantic Fan Fund, an organisation for science fiction fandom
- An International Conference on Transitioning Away from Fossil Fuels (TAFF)

== People ==
- a demonym for anyone from south Wales
- Jerry Taff (1940–2025), American television anchor
- John Taff (1890–1961), American professional baseball player
- Laurence G. Taff (born 1947), American astronomer
- Paul Taff (1920–2013), American television executive
- Jane Harvey (née Phyllis Taff; 1925–2013), American jazz singer
- Russ Taff (born 1953), American gospel singer

== See also ==
- Taff Vale (disambiguation)
- Taft (disambiguation)
