= Totally Minnie =

- Genre: Family; Musical
- Written by: Joie Albrecht
- Directed by: Scott Garen
- Starring: Russi Taylor; Robert Carradine; Patricia Parris; Suzanne Somers; Elton John; Wayne Allwine
- Country of origin: United States
- Original language: English

Production
- Producers: Scott Garen; Joie Albrecht
- Running time: 45 minutes
- Production companies: Walt Disney Television (Note: Animation production by FilmFair Communications.); Garen/Albrecht Productions

Original release
- Network: NBC
- Release: February 25, 1988

Totally Minnie is a musical television special hosted by Suzanne Somers and starring Minnie Mouse. It first aired on February 25, 1988, on NBC.

== Plot ==
The story centers on a saxophone player, Maxwell Dweeb, a nerdy loner who keeps getting rejected on dates and is friendless. He is also the owner of a fashion boutique. One day, he sees a group of singing girls at his job and tries to impress them, but they find him too nerdy and self-centered. Upset over being rejected, Maxwell returns home to his dog, whose behavior Maxwell always disapproves of. The dog is watching a music video in Roy Orbison-Esque sunglasses. Maxwell takes them off the dog and tries to get the remote, but the dog has it. Fed up with the dog, Maxwell plays his saxophone to annoy the dog and take the remote. Maxwell then sees an infomercial starring Minnie Mouse plugging her headquarters, The Minnie Mouse Center for the Totally Unhip. In the commercial, Maxwell is shown being rejected by the singing girls, and it is revealed that they work at the center. The dog thinks that Maxwell needs to change his behavior by going to the center. He then has an idea and leaves the room. NBC announcer Don Pardo reads out the center's phone number, and the dog returns with the phone. Maxwell picks it up, and as Pardo repeats the number, Maxwell dials it. Pardo then calls Maxwell a nerd, and the dog agrees.

When Maxwell arrives at the center, he encounters a woman who performs a rap song for him and later discovers that he has no rhythm, wears a pocket protector and needs a full crash course. She then introduces herself as the Director and begins teaching him how to be hip. On the way, he sees Donald, who is working as a wardrobe manager, and meets Philip Michael Thomas, Vanna White and Pluto in an indoor drive-thru room, where she tells Pluto to watch the movie, and he licks her.

Maxwell is then pulled away as the Director tells him that if he follows Minnie's instructions, his dull life will be upside down. Then he sees Goofy in the role of fitness instructor, who takes him to a room with a lot of TV sets. Maxwell is all alone until he sees the center's owner, Minnie Mouse. She keeps asking him if he wants to be hip, which frightens Maxwell at first. He says he does not want to be hip anymore, but then the real Minnie Mouse shows up and kicks the screen, surprising Maxwell as she shows him a flashback video from the time when she was not hip. After watching the video, Maxwell is approached by the Director, who, after seeing him fall to the ground, shows him clips of her friends who are as clumsy as he is. The clips make him laugh.

Maxwell's next lesson is how to do the "Neutron Dance". Afterwards, as he is about to kiss the Director, Minnie appears and tells Maxwell that nasty boys are not hip, while showing him clips of Peg-Leg Pete, set to the song "Nasty Boys". Maxwell laughs at first but then stops when clips of other Disney characters at their worst are shown.

After being asked how he feels about the video, Maxwell cannot come up with the right words to put it into words. Next, he is asked to sing, but it turns out that he cannot sing, so Minnie and the Director tell Maxwell he needs confidence. Maxwell watches a brief clip of Minnie and Mickey singing and a music video of Minnie and Sir Elton John. After that, he is told that his next lesson is romance. The Director changes from her geeky look to a more attractive one and takes him to the drive-in room. Maxwell keeps talking about this being his first date, but the Director stops him and gives him instructions on how to act on a date. Maxwell keeps ruining the course, until they watch more Disney clips about dating. He then asks if they could go out again, but she informs him that the center's policy prohibits employees from dating clients. As Maxwell plans to give up on romance, the Director tells him to keep watching, as the best is yet to come. After seeing clips of couples getting back together with the song "Jealousy & Making Up" (played in the beginning of the special), Maxwell calls the Director beautiful and says that she looks like Suzanne Somers (which she really is).

Later Maxwell comes out wearing the same clothing as Elton John while singing "Don't Go Breaking My Heart", saying he has a new look, but the Director disapproves of it, saying that it may work for Elton John, but not for Maxwell. She orders the female employees to give Maxwell the ultimate makeover to the song 'Shopping'. After coming out looking like a new person, Maxwell realizes he's done with the lessons and is ready to start his new life but admits that he's afraid to leave because, even though he looks hip, he's still the same nerd. A video of Donald and Walt Disney helps Maxwell learn how to be himself, and he makes a joke about talking like Donald. Afterwards, he receives his diploma and graduates. Maxwell, the Director and the female employees then dance to the song 'I'm so Excited' while more Disney clips play. At the end, Maxwell leaves the center to start his new life as a cool, hip guy.

== Main cast ==
=== Voices ===
- Russi Taylor – Minnie Mouse (voice)
- Wayne Allwine – Mickey Mouse (voice)
- Tony Anselmo – Donald Duck (voice)
- Patricia Parris – Daisy Duck (voice)
- Will Ryan – Goofy/Pete (voice)
- Don Pardo – Announcer (voice)

=== Actors ===
- Robert Carradine as Maxwell Dweeb
- Suzanne Somers as The Director
- Elton John as Himself
- Vanna White as Herself
- Philip Michael Thomas as Himself

== Production ==
It was the first production to feature Minnie Mouse in the lead role and, until the premiere of Mickey Mouse Works in 1999, in which she starred in several shorts. Russi Taylor, the original voice of Minnie at the time, actually met her future husband, Wayne Allwine, then voicing Mickey, while recording this special.

The animation for the special was provided by FilmFair Communications in Los Angeles.
