= Galaxy Goof-Ups =

1979 American animated television series

- Genre: Adventure; Comedy
- Created by: William Hanna; Joseph Barbera
- Directed by: William Hanna; Joseph Barbera
- Voices of: Daws Butler; Joe Besser; Mel Blanc; John Stephenson
- Theme music composer: Hoyt Curtin
- Country of origin: United States
- Original language: English
- No. of episodes: 13

Production
- Executive producers: William Hanna; Joseph Barbera
- Producer: Art Scott
- Running time: 30 minutes
- Production company: Hanna-Barbera Productions

Original release
- Network: NBC
- Release: September 9 – December 2, 1978

Related
- Yogi's Space Race; Yogi's Treasure Hunt

Galaxy Goof-Ups (also known as Yogi's Galaxy Goofs-Ups) is a 30-minute American animated television series, a spin-off of Yogi's Space Race and the fourth incarnation of the Yogi Bear franchise. The show was produced by Hanna-Barbera Productions and broadcast on NBC from September 9, 1978, to September 1, 1979.

The Galaxy Guardians—a.k.a. the "Galaxy Goof-ups"—consisted of Yogi Bear, Huckleberry Hound, Quack-Up and Scare Bear as space patrolmen under the leadership of Captain Snerdley; the four of them always goofed up while on duty, and spent most of their time in disco clubs. Despite their constant bumbling, however, they always emerged victorious.

The show originally aired as a segment on Yogi's Space Race from September 9 to October 28, 1978, and was the most popular segment on that show. Following the cancellation of Yogi's Space Race, Galaxy Goof-Ups was given its own half-hour timeslot on NBC beginning November 4, 1978. The show has been rebroadcast on USA Cartoon Express, Nickelodeon, TNT, Cartoon Network, Boomerang and MeTV Toons.

Quack-Up and Scare Bear made cameo appearances in Jellystone!

== Characters ==
The "Galaxy Goof-Ups" characters (Yogi Bear, Scare Bear, Huckleberry Hound and Quack-Up) are all from Space Race, except for the following two new characters who are exclusive to this series:

Captain Snerdley: The Commander of the Galaxy Goof-Ups, Captain Snerdley is forced to put up with their clumsiness since they somehow solve the cases that they are assigned to. In "The Dopey Defenders", to make sure the new equipment will work better, he had installed a mechanism which keeps them from touching it.

General Bullhorn: Bullhorn is Snerdley's superior. He is unaware of the Goof-Ups' incompetence and blames Snerdley for whatever goes wrong. In one episode he is seen removing medals (along with pieces of uniform) from Snerdley every time they commit a blunder.

== Cast ==
- Daws Butler as Yogi Bear, Huckleberry Hound, Son
- Joe Besser as Scare Bear
- Mel Blanc as Quack-Up
- John Stephenson as Captain Snerdley, General Blowhard, Papa
- Don Messick as Tacky Cat, Space-Spider
- Ted Cassidy as Drako
- Janet Waldo as Female Yogi look-alike

=== Additional ===
- Roger Behr
- B.J Cling
- Henry Corden
- Joan Gerber
- Marcy Goldman
- Bob Hastings
- Jim MacGeorge
- Ginny McSwain
- Marilyn Schreffler
- Alexis Tramunti
- Lennie Weinrib
- Frank Welker

== Episodes ==
No.	Title	Original release date	Prod. code
1	"The Purloined Princess"	September 9, 1978	101
Princess Glama of the planet Camelotta is kidnapped by Zangra and her robot henchman Drako, who use her as bait to trap the Goof-ups; however, the heroes prove to be so incompetent that the villains have to help them get into the trap. Once inside, the Goof-ups' bungling enables them to rescue the princess and escape.
2	"Defective Protectives"	September 16, 1978	103
General Blowhard is carrying secret plans to prevent the Space Spider's plot to take over the universe. The General needs a good night's sleep before the next day's high-level meeting, so the Goof-ups have to capture the Space Spider and protect the General without waking him up.
3	"Whose Zoo?"	September 23, 1978	102
Sagar the hunter, with the aid of his lackey Grog, has been capturing "lower life-forms" for an interplanetary zoo, and he plans to add the Galaxy Goof-ups—the lowest life-forms he's ever seen—to his collection. After being lured into Sagar's trap, the heroes and Captain Snerdley try to escape, accidentally releasing all the other animals in the process.
4	"The Space Pirates"	September 30, 1978	105
The Goof-ups are assigned to deliver a shipment of gold bullion from the Galaxy Bank to the Galaxy Mint, but they're tricked into handing it all to Captain Sly and his space pirates, so they have to get it back.
5	"The Clone Ranger"	October 7, 1978	104
Tacky Cat is seeking revenge against Captain Snerdley for kicking him out of the service. To this end, he steals a cloning machine from Command Central, and kidnaps Snerdley because no one else knows how to operate it.
6	"The Dopey Defenders"	October 14, 1978	106
Command Central receives a shipment of the latest top-secret equipment. Zangra, disguised as interviewer Barbie Wally (a take-off of Barbara Walters), tricks the Goof-ups into loading all the equipment onto her ship. However, they accidentally take off in her ship, so Zangra and Drako go after them in the Goof-ups' ship.
7	"Tacky Cat Strikes Again"	October 21, 1978	108
Tacky Cat—under orders from his wife Perfecta, who hates the tacky way they live—takes over the planet Camelotta and imprisons Princess Glama. The Goof-ups arrive to free the princess, and Perfecta's constant nagging drives Tacky Cat to surrender to them. In the end, however, Glama comes up with a solution to the Cats' marital discord: she has their planet made half-pristine and half-tacky, so they can both be happy.
8	"Space Station USA"	October 28, 1978	107
The vessel Space Station USA, which had been missing for centuries, is found floating in space; Captain Snerdley orders the Goof-ups to pilot the station to the Galaxonian Museum. The richest man in the galaxy, however, wants to add the vessel to his own collection (which appears to include the Starship Enterprise), so he uses disguises and trickery to steal it from the Goof-ups. During this episode, the Goof-ups encounter four female versions of themselves, and accompany them to the disco.
9	"Hail, King Yogi!"	November 4, 1978	109
A jungle-covered planet has drifted into Command Central's galaxy, and the Goof-ups are sent to investigate it. The primitive natives are so impressed with Yogi's "magic"—i.e., his hand-held teleportation device—that the tribe's queen makes him their new witch doctor, and he and his crewmates live a life of luxury. However, when Yogi realizes that the queen intends to marry him, he and his friends desperately try to escape from the planet. In this episode, the Goof-ups don't go to a disco; instead, they dance to music from a radio while on the jungle planet.
10	"Dyno-Mite!"	November 11, 1978	110
Dyno-Mite, a tiny space villain, causes chaos when he steals a new weapon, the Stretch-Shrink Ray.
11	"Vampire of Space"	November 18, 1978	111
The vampire Count Vampula plans to take over the universe with his army of zombies. The first step in his plan is to put the bite on Captain Snerdley, turning him into the Count's vampire slave, so that the Galaxy Goof-ups will be lured into a trap and turned into vampires as well.
12	"The Treasure of Congo-Bongo"	November 25, 1978	112
Rupert and Dimitri (spoofs of Sydney Greenstreet and Peter Lorre) deliberately cause a remote-controlled ship to crash down on the jungle planet Congo-Bongo; this ship carries the treasure-matic computer, which can produce precious metals and gems. The villains then race the Goof-ups through the perils of the jungle to get the computer.
13	"Captain Snerdley Goes Bananas"	December 2, 1978	113
The General sends Captain Snerdley to the Galaxy Sanitarium for his overworked nerves; visits from the Goof-Ups make his condition even worse. Meanwhile, the reptilian Lozar from the planet Lizardia uses the body of head psychiatrist Dr. Wacceau as a disguise, so he can study Snerdley's mind and body; once the study is complete, the Lizardian invasion will begin.

== See also ==
- List of works produced by Hanna-Barbera
- List of Hanna-Barbera characters
