= Yogi's Space Race =

1978 American animated television series

- Genre: Comedy; Adventure; Sci-Fi; Fantasy
- Directed by: Ray Patterson; Carl Urbano
- Voices of: Daws Butler; Joe Besser; Mel Blanc; Pat Parris; Marilyn Schreffler; Frank Welker
- Narrated by: Gary Owens
- Composer: Hoyt Curtin
- Country of origin: United States
- Original language: English
- No. of episodes: 13

Production
- Executive producers: William Hanna; Joseph Barbera
- Producer: Art Scott
- Running time: 90 minutes
- Production company: Hanna-Barbera Productions

Original release
- Network: NBC
- Release: September 9 – December 2, 1978

Yogi's Space Race is a 90-minute American animated television series, and the third entry in the Yogi Bear franchise, produced by Hanna-Barbera Productions. Thirteen episodes were broadcast on NBC from September 9, 1978, to December 2, 1978, and featured the following four segments:

- Yogi's Space Race: Yogi Bear, Huckleberry Hound, Jabberjaw and several new characters participating in intergalactic racing competitions.
- Galaxy Goof-Ups: Yogi Bear, Scare Bear, Huckleberry Hound, and Quack-Up as four intergalactic police officers.
- The Buford Files: Buford is a sleepy bloodhound who solves mysteries in Fenokee County with two teenagers named Cindy Mae and Woody. Not to be confused with The Rockford Files.
- The Galloping Ghost: Nugget Nose is a ghost miner who is a guardian to Wendy and Rita at the Fuddy Dude Ranch.

When Galaxy Goof-Ups was given its own half-hour timeslot on November 4, 1978, Yogi's Space Race was reduced to 60 minutes. In early 1979, the Space Race segment was also spun off in its own half-hour series from February 3 to March 3, 1979. The series was later aired in reruns on USA Cartoon Express, Nickelodeon, Cartoon Network, Boomerang and MeTV Toons.

Yogi's Space Race was referenced in Jellystone!

== Overview ==
The show featured Yogi Bear, Huckleberry Hound, Jabberjaw and several new characters as competitors in an outer space reworking of Wacky Races and commentated by an unseen announcer. They would each compete for the race's prize. The winners of each race got a prize which ended up unfortunate such as having to do the dishes after their meal at the Ritz or being literally painted by an artist.

Cameo guests included Fred Flintstone, Barney Rubble, Quick Draw McGraw, Grape Ape, Frankenstein Jr. and Jana of the Jungle; the supporting segments were Galaxy Goof-Ups, The Buford Files and The Galloping Ghost.

The latter two were repackaged the following year as Buford and the Galloping Ghost. When Galaxy Goof-Ups was given its own half-hour timeslot on November 4, 1978, Yogi's Space Race was reduced to 60 minutes. On February 3, 1979, the Space Race segment and Buford and the Galloping Ghost were also spun off in their own half-hour series.

== Characters ==
=== Racers ===
- Yogi Bear (voiced by Daws Butler) and Scare Bear (voiced by Joe Besser) – Yogi stays unchanged save for the change in setting, but his friend Boo Boo was unable to participate in the race and never appears in the show. Instead, his companion and partner is Scare Bear, a small fuzzy bear who (as his name implies) is afraid of almost everything. Yogi and Scare Bear are a racing team on "Space Race" and members of the "Galaxy Goof-Ups".
- Huckleberry Hound (voiced by Daws Butler) and Quack-Up (voiced by Mel Blanc) - Quack-Up is a duck who is the crazy and clumsy pilot of the team while Huck just rests at the top of their ship. They are also members of the "Galaxy Goof-Ups".
- Jabberjaw and Buford (both voiced by Frank Welker) – Jabberjaw is still on his search for respect from his original series. His partner is Buford, from The Buford Files, where he's the lazy pet dog of two kids, Cindy Mae and Woody who solve mysteries in Fenokee County. Their race ship contains a track on which Buford runs to increase speed, which, since it is hard to keep him awake, is seldom used. Jabberjaw was once seen running on it during the episode "The Saturn 500".
- Nugget Nose (voiced by Frank Welker), Wendy (voiced by Marilyn Schreffler) and Rita (voiced by Pat Parris) – The only racing team in the race that's a trio (as the rest are all duos), and the only team with any female members. They all are characters from The Galloping Ghost where Wendy and Rita work at the Fuddy Dude Ranch and Nugget Nose is a gold-obsessed ghost who is jealous of the girls. His nose looks like a nugget (hence the name).
- Captain Good/Phantom Phink and Clean Kat/Sinister Sludge (both voiced by Frank Welker) To the eyes of the other characters, Captain Good is the personification of good sportsmanship and fights for everything right. To the viewers, he's actually Phantom Phink, a space racer who uses all possible sorts of cheating like Dick Dastardly, except that he actually wins some races, crossing the finish line either as Captain Good or as Phantom Phink. The duo can transform themselves, and their car, at the touch of a button. Captain Good looks like a handsome white-clad and blond-haired muscle man while Phink is a skinny costumed creep with a big nose and bristly black beard. Although Good/Phink never tricks people into believing they are seeing both of them at the same time and Phink never shows up for the start of any race, no one (including the narrator) ever suspects Good and Phink are one and the same. No matter which identity he must use, Good/Phink usually tries to get help from people who live on the planets where the races take place.
- Clean Kat/Sinister Sludge is the pet cat/dog of Captain Good/Phantom Phink. Clean Kat is a white and snobby cat while Sinister Sludge is a sleazy brown dog who's usually told by Phink to shut up. Whenever Good/Phink morphs, Kat/Sludge also morphs (however, he is capable of doing it separated from his master, such as in "The Saturn 500", when Phink says dogs aren't allowed on Mars and he morphs, causing Phink to says cats aren't either and in "The Mizar Marathon" when Good said that cats aren't allowed in a castle, to which he morphs and Good says that goes for dogs too).

=== Other characters ===
- The Narrator (voiced by Gary Owens) – This unseen character is the narrator of the Space Race and presenter of the Space Race Biography. He sometimes talks to the characters of the series.
- El Fabuloso – The Space Race's official computer which often speaks in Spanish. It analyzes the races to catch any cheat practiced and often disqualifies Phantom Phink for cheating. As a result, Phink usually uses his alter-ego to stay in the race. In "Franzia" after Good/Phink tricks the local version of Quasimodo to stop the other racers, El Fabuloso finally discovers they're one and the same. Nobody believes it and the narrator assumes El Fabuloso has a malfunction. To keep his secret identity, Phink has to convert into Captain Good to save the Space Racers.

== Biography ==
The series often introduces the biography of some Space Racers or their ancestors. Phantom Phink was once described as a "descendant" of Dr. Jekyll, who was described looking like Captain Good while Mr. Hyde looks like Phink, giving us an idea of Good's/Phink's original look that contradicts the idea believed by many fans that Clean Kat/Sinister Sludge is originally a dog since this is his shape as Phantom Phink's pet and Sludge is the one to have a biography.

== Episodes ==
Thirteen episodes were broadcast in 1978.

| No. | Title | Original release date |
|---|---|---|
| 1 | "The Saturn 500" | September 9, 1978 |
Winners: Yogi Bear and Scare Bear. Prize: Vacation trip to Mars. Trouble: They continue to be chased by the snow bear during the vacation on Mars.
| 2 | "The Neptune 9000" | September 16, 1978 |
Winners: Captain Good and Clean Kat. Prize: A car/ship that converts into a bag for easy keeping. Trouble: The car/ship did it with Captain Good inside it.
| 3 | "The Pongo Tongo Classic" | September 23, 1978 |
Winners: Yogi Bear and Scare Bear. Prize: Dinner at Ritz. Trouble: They have to do the dishes after their dinner. Guest star: Jana of the Jungle
| 4 | "Nebuloc–The Prehistoric Planet" | September 30, 1978 |
Winners: Phantom Phink and Sinister Sludge. Prize: Being painted by a famous artist. Trouble: They were literally painted. Guest stars: Fred Flintstone, Barney Rubble, Grape Ape.
| 5 | "The Spartikan Spectacular" | October 7, 1978 |
Winners: Captain Good and Clean Kat. Prize: A ride at a cruise boat. Trouble: They had to travel with the cargo.
| 6 | "The Mizar Marathon" | October 14, 1978 |
Winners: Jabberjaw and Buford. Prize: A self massaging bed. Trouble: The bed beats them up with its robot hands.
| 7 | "The Lost Planet of Atlantis" | October 21, 1978 |
Winners: Phantom Phink and Sinister Sludge. Prize: Vacation time at a ski lodge. Trouble: They had to pull the sleigh with everyone on it.
| 8 | "Race Through Oz" | October 28, 1978 |
Winners: Captain Good and Clean Kat. Prize: A date with a computer-chosen partner. Trouble: He's got a date with the Wicked Space Witch of the West.
| 9 | "Race Through Wet Galoshes" | November 4, 1978 |
Winners: Nugget Nose, Wendy and Rita. Prize: Vacation time at a dude ranch. Trouble: It's Fuddy's Dude Ranch. Guest star: Quick Draw McGraw
| 10 | "The Borealis Triangle" | November 11, 1978 |
Winners: Phantom Phink and Sinister Sludge. Prize: Roles in a movie made in Hollywood. Trouble: They had to make dangerous scenes.
| 11 | "Race to the Center of the Universe" | November 18, 1978 |
Winners: Huckleberry Hound and Quack-Up. Prize: Tickets to an Amusement Park named Funkyland. Trouble: They got jobs as the dunking clowns.
| 12 | "Race Through the Planet of the Monsters" | November 25, 1978 |
Winners: Captain Good and Clean Kat. Prize: Tickets to the Rolling Clones. Trouble: They have to lay down at the floor with other viewers over them. Guest stars: Frankenstein Jr. and Buzz Conroy
| 13 | "Franzia" | December 2, 1978 |
Winners: Huckleberry Hound and Quack-Up. Prize: Tickets for a flight on a luxury jet plane. Trouble: They didn't get seats inside the plane.

== Voices ==
- Daws Butler – Yogi Bear, Huckleberry Hound, Quick Draw McGraw
- Joe Besser – Scare Bear
- Mel Blanc – Quack-Up, Barney Rubble
- Frank Welker – Jabberjaw, Buford, Nugget Nose, Captain Good/Phantom Phink, Clean Kat/Sinister Sludge
- Marilyn Schreffler – Wendy
- Pat Parris – Rita, Cindy Mae
- Dave Landsburg – Woody
- Henry Corden – Sheriff Muletrain, Fred Flintstone
- Roger Peltz – Deputy Goofer McGee
- Hal Peary – Fenwick Fuddy
- Bob Holt – Grape Ape
- John Stephenson – Captain Snerdley, General Blowhard
- Gary Owens – The Narrator

=== Additional voices ===
- Roger Behr
- Tony Caruso
- Ted Cassidy
- B.J. Cling
- Henry Corden
- Joan Gerber
- Virginia Gregg
- Bob Hastings
- Ralph James
- Casey Kasem
- Marcy Goldman
- Jim MacGeorge
- Ginny McSwain
- Don Messick
- Ronnie Schell
- Hal Smith
- Alexis Tramunti
- Janet Waldo
- Lennie Weinrib

== See also ==
- List of works produced by Hanna-Barbera
- List of Hanna-Barbera characters
- Yogi Bear (character)
- The Yogi Bear Show
- Wacky Races
- Yogi's Gang
- Galaxy Goof-Ups
- Yogi's Treasure Hunt
- The New Yogi Bear Show
- Fender Bender 500
- Yo Yogi!

== In other languages ==
- French: Le Grand Prix Spacial de Yogi
- Italian: La corsa spaziale di Yoghi
- Spanish: La Carrera Espacial de Yogi
