= Taffy (nickname) =

Taffy is a nickname for:

- Clarence Taffy Abel (1900–1964), first U.S.-born Native American player to become a National Hockey League regular player
- Edward George Bowen (1911–1991), Welsh physicist and radio astronomer who helped develop radar
- William Taffy Davies (1910–1995), Welsh footballer
- Herbert Jones (footballer, born 1896) (1896–1973), English footballer
- Mary Taffy Nivert (born 1944), American songwriter and singer, member of the Starland Vocal Band
- Eugene Taffy O'Callaghan (1906–1946), Welsh footballer
- Isaac Taffy Spelman (1914–?), English footballer
- Hendrick Waye, Australian rules footballer in the early 1900s
- Hugh Taffy Williams (1933–1996), Welsh mercenary
- Tafara Taffy Mupariwa (born 1996), a Zimbabwean cricketer
- Taft Taffy Wright (1911–1981), American Major League Baseball player
