= Darreh-ye Tafi, Saqqez =

Darreh-ye Tafi دره تفي
- Village
- Location within Iran
- Coordinates: 36°03′46″N 46°32′41″E
- Country: Iran
- Province: Kurdistan
- County: Saqqez
- Bakhsh: Ziviyeh
- Rural District: Khvor Khvoreh

Population (2006)
  - Total: 192
- Time zone: UTC+3:30 (IRST)
  - Summer (DST): UTC+4:30 (IRDT)

Darreh-ye Tafi (Persian: دره تفي, also romanized as Darreh-ye Tafī) is a village in Khvor Khvoreh Rural District, Ziviyeh District, Saqqez County, Kurdistan Province, Iran. At the 2006 census, its population was 192, in 35 families. The village is populated by Kurds.
