= Buford and the Galloping Ghost =

American animated television series

- Genre: Mystery; Comedy
- Directed by: Ray Patterson; Carl Urbano
- Voices of: Frank Welker; Pat Parris; Dave Landsburg; Marilyn Schreffler; Henry Corden; Roger Peltz; Hal Peary
- Theme music composer: Hoyt Curtin
- Country of origin: United States
- Original language: English
- No. of episodes: 13 (26 segments)

Production
- Executive producers: William Hanna; Joseph Barbera
- Producer: Art Scott
- Running time: 30 minutes
- Production company: Hanna-Barbera Productions

Original release
- Network: NBC
- Release: September 9 – December 2, 1978

Related
- Yogi's Space Race

Buford and the Galloping Ghost is an American animated television series and a spin-off of Yogi's Space Race produced by Hanna-Barbera Productions that was broadcast on NBC from September 9 to December 2, 1978. The half-hour series was composed of two 11-minute segments: The Buford Files and The Galloping Ghost.

The Buford Files and The Galloping Ghost originally aired as segments on Yogi's Space Race from September 9, 1978, to January 27, 1979. Following the cancellation of Yogi's Space Race, both segments were repackaged and spun off into a half-hour show on NBC from February 3 to September 1, 1979. The show has been rebroadcast on USA Cartoon Express, Cartoon Network and Boomerang. Two decades later, after its recent airing on Boomerang, the show returned on MeTV Toons, during its block called "Cartoon Carousel", from October 26, 2026 to October 30, 2026.

== Segments ==
=== The Buford Files ===
Buford (voiced by Frank Welker) is a lazy bloodhound with a mournful bark and a sharp nose for solving mysteries who lives deep in Fenokee Swamp. He teams up with the teenage Boggs twins, Cindy Mae (voiced by Pat Parris) and Woody (voiced by Dave Landsburg). The trio solves confusing mysteries that baffle Sheriff Muletrain (voiced by Henry Corden) and his overeager but dimwitted deputy Goofer McGee (voiced by Roger Peltz). Buford's abilities are expanded with ears that revolve like radar dishes, and his nose responds to clues like a Geiger counter.

But Buford has two weaknesses: when the moon comes out, he howls incessantly (often at the most perilous moments), and he also has a running feud with a karate-whacking raccoon. Both things also set off his glowing nose.

=== The Galloping Ghost ===
Nugget Nose (voiced by Frank Welker) is a short and feisty ghost of an Old West gold prospector who finds adventure riding his invisible horse. He is also a guardian to Wendy (voiced by Marilyn Schreffler) and Rita (voiced by Pat Parris), two young cowgirls who work at the Fuddy Dude Ranch, owned by grouchy, old Fenwick Fuddy (voiced by Hal Peary).

Whenever Fuddy threatens to fire the girls, Nugget makes himself invisible and becomes a helping friend. He is always battling Fuddy and takes delight in harassing him in odd and humorous ways. When the girls are in trouble, Wendy summons Nugget by rubbing on her special gold nugget necklace as Nugget Nose helps to deal with the trouble.

== Episodes ==
Each episode featured one 11-minute segment of The Buford Files and The Galloping Ghost

No.	Titles	Original release date
1	"The Swamp Hermit / Phantom of the Horse Opera"	September 9, 1978
The Swamp Hermit: Woody, Cindy Mae and Buford visit their friend Jeb Crowley in Fenokee Swamp and soon discover he has been kidnapped by a pair of escaped convicts.; Phantom of the Horse Opera: Wendy and Rita are star-struck with dreams of becoming movie stars when a Hollywood producer visits the Fuddy Dude Ranch.
2	"The Vanishing Stallion / Too Many Crooks"	September 16, 1978
The Vanishing Stallion: Woody, Cindy Mae and Buford watch a stallion mysteriously disappear during the Fenokee annual steeplechase race.; Too Many Crooks: A crook-on-the-loose seeks refuge at the Fuddy Dude Ranch; Wendy and Rita summon Nugget Nose to help save the day and capture the crook.
3	"The Swamp Saucer / Sagebrush Sergeant"	September 23, 1978
The Swamp Saucer: Woody, Cindy Mae and Buford investigate when a mysterious UFO has been sighted in Fenokee Swamp and they get in contact with an astro-chimp.; Sagebrush Sergeant: Mr. Fuddy's sister—a tough army sergeant—visits the ranch and starts Fuddy and the girls on a rigid schedule of exercise and work.
4	"The Man with Orange Hair / Bad News Bear"	September 30, 1978
The Man with Orange Hair: At the Fenokee Sports Palace, Woody, Cindy Mae and Buford investigate when a pair of silver ice skates are stolen by a performer with orange hair.; Bad News Bear: Nugget Nose and the girls try to prevent Mr. Fuddy and a safety inspector from discovering a grizzly bear hiding out at the Fuddy Dude Ranch.
5	"The Demon of Ur / Robot Round-Up"	October 7, 1978
The Demon of Ur: Deputy Goofer fails to safeguard a demon statue of Ur, which disappears from a train bound from Tecusah to the Fenokee Community Center.; Robot Round-Up: Wendy and Rita are worried of losing their jobs when Mr. Fuddy purchases a robot to work at the Fuddy Dude Ranch.
6	"The Missing Bank / Pests in the West"	October 14, 1978
The Missing Bank: Deputy Goofer delivers $10 million from Fenokee Bank to a bank in Culpepper in an armored car, but the bank president claims he never received the money.; Pests in the West: Mr. Fuddy hires two bumbling exterminators when he believes his ranch yard is overrun by giant gophers, but the gopher holes are actually caused by Nugget Nose's endless search for gold.
7	"Scare in the Air / Rock Star Nuggie"	October 21, 1978
Scare in the Air: At a Fenokee air show, Buford gets caught in a near-plane crashing accident and next comes an amphibious plane out of control and going missing.; Rock Star Nuggie: Nugget Nose becomes jealous of Wendy and Rita's fawning over a visiting rock star and he begins causing trouble to scare him away.
8	"Buford and the Beauty / Frontier Fortune Teller"	October 28, 1978
Buford and the Beauty: Woody, Cindy Mae, and Buford go see a movie being filmed in Fenokee County starring a show dog named Duchess, who is kidnapped for ransom.; Frontier Fortune Teller: Wendy and Rita seek Nugget Nose's help when a couple of thieves posing as phony fortune tellers plot to steal Mr. Fuddy's furniture.
9	"Peril in the Park / I Want My Mummy"	November 4, 1978
Peril in the Park: Woody, Cindy Mae, and Buford visit the local amusement park to look for summer jobs, but the place is closing down because someone is sabotaging the rides.; I Want My Mummy: At the Fuddy Dude Ranch costume party, Wendy is disguised as the mummy of Queen Tut-Tut, a rejuvenated ancient female Egyptian ruler.
10	"The Magic Whammy / Mr. Sunshine's Eclipse"	November 11, 1978
The Magic Whammy: Woody, Cindy Mae, and Buford attend the Great Zambini Magic Show while banks in Fenokee are mysteriously being robbed without any sign of a break-in.; Mr. Sunshine's Eclipse: Wendy and Rita summon Nugget Nose to scare away Mr. Sunshine, an annoying TV prankster on vacation at the Fuddy Dude Ranch.
11	"The Haunting of Swamp Manor / Klondike Kate"	November 18, 1978
The Haunting of Swamp Manor: Woody, Cindy Mae and Buford venture in the old Grimsley Mansion which is haunted by the ghost of Jedediah Grimsley, a Confederate general.; Klondike Kate: Nugget Nose is reunited with Klondike Kate—a ghost girlfriend from his past—whom he had promised to marry if he struck gold.
12	"The Case of the Missing Gator / A Ghost of a Chance"	November 25, 1978
The Case of the Missing Gator: Jeb Crowley's pet alligator Gertrude is missing and smugglers in the swamp are after some stolen diamonds.; A Ghost of a Chance: A millionaire guest offers Mr. Fuddy $1 million to prove that ghosts exist at the Fuddy Dude Ranch, so Fuddy goes to great lengths to try and capture Nugget Nose.
13	"Don't Monkey with Buford / Elmo the Great"	December 2, 1978
Don't Monkey with Buford: Woody, Cindy Mae and Buford are invited to the circus by Duchess, whose diamond collar is stolen during the parade by a chimp.; Elmo the Great: Wendy and Rita buy a horse named Elmo as a surprise birthday gift for Mr. Fuddy, but the troublesome horse becomes too much for Fuddy to handle.

== Production ==
Buford and the Galloping Ghost was animated at Filman, an animation studio in Madrid, Spain (headed by Carlos Alfonso and Juan Pina) who did a lot of animation work for Hanna-Barbera between the early 1970s through the mid-1980s.

== Other appearances ==
- Characters from this show appear in Jellystone!:
  - Nugget Nose appears in the episode "Chair Me Matey", voiced by Dana Snyder. This version is still alive and is the Keeper of Dad Gift Island while also knowing about Moby Dick's girlfriend Brenda breaking up with him. Yogi Bear, Boo Boo Bear, and the air pirates led by Captain Swipe had to raid Dad Gift Island in order to reclaim Yogi's chair that was ultimately sold to Nugget Nose. Nugget Nose lost to a sword duel with Yogi because he used an inflatable sword. The chair is bought back by Moby Dick who successfully sued a whale that was posing as a mermaid.
  - The Demon of Ur appears in "Theme Works Make the Dream Work". This version is an actual demon.
