= Darreh Tefi, Marivan =

Darreh Tefi دره تفي
- Village
- Location within Iran
- Coordinates: 35°32′14″N 46°05′52″E
- Country: Iran
- Province: Kurdistan
- County: Marivan
- Bakhsh: Central
- Rural District: Zarivar

Population (2006)
  - Total: 959
- Time zone: UTC+3:30 (IRST)
  - Summer (DST): UTC+4:30 (IRDT)

Darreh Tefi (Persian: دره تفي, also Romanized as Darreh Tefī, Darreh Tofī, Darreh Tafī, and Darreh-ye Tefī; also known as Darreh Taghi, Darreh Taqī, and Darreh Tufi) is a village in Zarivar Rural District, in the Central District of Marivan County, Kurdistan Province, Iran. At the 2006 census, its population was 959, in 218 families. The village is populated by Kurds.
