= Taff Vale =

Taff Vale may refer to:

- The valley of the River Taff in South Wales surrounded by the communities of Ynysybwl & Coed-y-Cwm, Pontypridd and Taffs Well
- Taff Vale Railway, a Welsh railway line
- Taff Vale Railway Co. v. Amalgamated Society of Railway Servants, a 1901 court case
