= Hanna-Barbera =

American animation studio and production company

Hanna-Barbera Cartoons, Inc.
- Final logo, used from 1988 to 2001. The red variant shown here was first introduced in 1990.

- The Hanna-Barbera headquarters in Los Angeles in the 1990s. The "swirling star" logo on the right was designed by Saul Bass in 1979.
- Formerly: H-B Enterprises (1957–1959); Hanna-Barbera Productions, Inc. (1959–1992); H-B Production Co. (1992–1993)
- Type: Subsidiary
- Industry: Film; Animation; Television
- Predecessor: MGM Cartoons
- Founded: July 7, 1957; 69 years ago
- Founders: William Hanna; Joseph Barbera; George Sidney
- Defunct: 2001; 25 years ago
- Fate: Absorbed into Warner Bros. Animation, currently an in-name-only label of Warner Bros.
- Successors: Studio: Cartoon Network Studios; Warner Bros. Animation; Hanna-Barbera Studios Europe (in-name only); Library: Warner Bros. Television Studios; (through Warner Bros. Animation); (except licensed properties); Toho; (Godzilla only)
- Headquarters: Kling Studios, Hollywood, California, U.S. (1957–1960); Cahuenga Boulevard, Hollywood Hills, Los Angeles, California, U.S. (1960–1998); Sherman Oaks Galleria, Sherman Oaks, Los Angeles, California, U.S. (1998–2001)
- Products: Theatrical feature films; Television films; Television series; Theatrical short films; Commercials; Direct-to-video entries; Television specials
- Owner: Screen Gems (18%, 1957–1966)
- Parent: Taft Broadcasting (1966–1987); Great American Broadcasting (1987–1991); Apollo Global Management (1991–1993); Turner Entertainment Co. (1991–2001)
- Divisions: Hanna-Barbera Australia (1972–1988); Hanna-Barbera Television (1975–1976); Wang Film Productions (50%, 1978–1990s); Fil-Cartoons (1987–2001); Bedrock Productions (1990); Cartoon Network Studios (1994–2001)

Hanna-Barbera Cartoons, Inc. (/bɑːrˈbɛərə/ bar-BAIR-ə; also known simply as Hanna Barbera, and formerly known as H-B Enterprises, Hanna-Barbera Productions, Inc. and H-B Production Co.) was an American animation studio and production company that operated from 1957 until its absorption into Warner Bros. Animation in 2001. The studio was founded on July 7, 1957, by William Hanna and Joseph Barbera, the creators of Tom and Jerry and former MGM Cartoons employees, along with film producer George Sidney. Initially headquartered at Kling Studios in Los Angeles from 1957 to 1960, the company later moved to Cahuenga Boulevard until 1998, and finally to the Sherman Oaks Galleria in Sherman Oaks from 1998 to 2001.

Hanna-Barbera was known for producing a vast array of animated series, including Huckleberry Hound, all iterations of The Flintstones, Yogi Bear, Jonny Quest, Scooby-Doo, Super Friends, and The Smurfs. However, by the 1980s, the studio's dominance declined as the market for Saturday-morning cartoons weakened, and weekday syndication grew in importance. Hanna-Barbera was acquired by Taft Broadcasting in 1966 and remained under its ownership until 1991, when Turner Broadcasting System purchased the company. Turner used Hanna-Barbera's extensive back catalog to help launch Cartoon Network in 1992, giving a new platform for the studio's classic animated properties.

After William Hanna died in 2001, Hanna-Barbera ceased to exist as an independent studio and was fully integrated into Warner Bros. Animation. Hanna-Barbera continues to exist as an in-name-only unit of Skydance managing copyright, marketing, and branding purposes of properties created during Hanna-Barbera's existence.

== History ==
=== Tom and Jerry and birth of a studio (1938–1957) ===
William Denby "Bill" Hanna and Joseph Roland "Joe" Barbera met at the Metro-Goldwyn-Mayer (MGM) studio in 1938, while working at its animation unit. Having worked at other studios since the early 1930s, they solidified a six-decade working partnership. Tom and Jerry, their very first collaborative success, came about in 1940, centering on the madcap comical adventures of a cat and a mouse. Hanna supervised the animation, while Barbera did the stories and pre-production for all 114 cartoons. Seven of the films won seven Oscars for "Best Short Subject (Cartoons)" between 1943 and 1953, and five additional shorts were nominated for twelve awards during this period. However, they were awarded to producer Fred Quimby, who was not directly involved in the development of the shorts. With Quimby's retirement in May 1955, Hanna and Barbera became the producers in charge of the MGM animation studio's output.

In addition to continuing to write and direct new Tom & Jerry shorts, now in CinemaScope, Hanna and Barbera produced the last seven shorts of Tex Avery's Droopy series, directed by Michael Lah, and produced and directed the short-lived Spike and Tyke, which ran for two entries. In addition to their work on the cartoons, the two men moonlighted on outside projects, including title sequences and commercials for I Love Lucy.

MGM decided in mid-1957 to close its cartoon studio, as it felt it had acquired a reasonable backlog of shorts for re-release. While contemplating their future, Hanna and Barbera began producing additional animated television commercials. During their last year at MGM, they had developed a concept for a new animated television program about a cat and a dog.

After failing to convince the studio to back their venture, George Sidney offered to serve as their business partner and convinced Screen Gems to make a deal with the producers. Sidney, a veteran live-action producer-director, had worked with Hanna and Barbera on animated elements for several of his movies for MGM, Anchors Aweigh in particular. A coin toss gave Hanna precedence in naming the new studio. Harry Cohn, president and head of Columbia Pictures, took an 18% ownership in H-B Enterprises, and provided working capital.

Screen Gems became the new distributor and its licensing agent, handling merchandizing of the characters from the animated programs as the cartoon firm officially opened for business in rented offices on the lot of Kling Studios (formerly Charlie Chaplin Studios) on July 7, 1957, one year after the MGM animation studio closed.

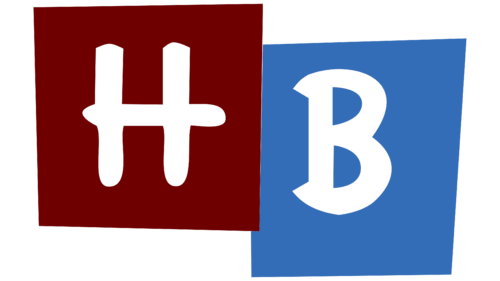
Logo used from 1957 to 1958

Logo used from 1958 to 1959

Sidney and several Screen Gems alumni became members of the studio's board of directors and much of the former MGM animation staff—including animators Carlo Vinci, Kenneth Muse, Lewis Marshall, Michael Lah and Ed Barge and layout artists Ed Benedict and Richard Bickenbach—became the new production staff while Hoyt Curtin was in charge of providing the music.

=== Success with animated series (1957–1969) ===
The Ruff and Reddy Show, the studio's first animated television series, premiered on NBC on December 14, 1957, then The Huckleberry Hound Show (feat. Pixie and Dixie and Mr. Jinks, Yogi Bear and Hokey Wolf) debuted one year later, in 1958, airing in most markets, and was also the first cartoon to win an Emmy. Several animation alumni joined – in particular former Warner Bros. Cartoons storymen Michael Maltese and Warren Foster as head writers, Joe Ruby and Ken Spears as film editors and Iwao Takamoto as character designer.

After reincorporating as Hanna-Barbera Productions, Inc., The Quick Draw McGraw Show (feat. Augie Doggie and Doggie Daddy and Snooper and Blabber) and the theatrical cartoon short series Loopy De Loop followed in 1959. Walt Disney Productions laid off several of its animators after Sleeping Beauty (1959) bombed on the box-office during its initial theatrical run, with many of them moving to Hanna-Barbera shortly afterwards. In August 1960, it moved into a window-less, cinder block building at 3501 Cahuenga Boulevard West. Because it was too small to house the staff, some of its employees worked at home.

The Flintstones premiered on ABC on September 30, 1960, becoming the first animated series airing in prime time. It is loosely based on The Honeymooners and is set in a fictionalized Stone Age of cavemen and dinosaurs. Jackie Gleason considered suing Hanna-Barbera for copyright infringement, but decided not to because he did not want to be known as "the man who yanked Fred Flintstone off the air". For six seasons, it became the longest-running animated show in American prime time at the time (until The Simpsons beat it in 1997), a ratings and merchandising success and the top-ranking animated program in syndication history, all while dawning a media franchise with several spinoffs, movies and specials. It initially received mixed reviews from critics, but its reputation eventually improved and it is now considered a classic.

The Yogi Bear Show (feat. Snagglepuss and Yakky Doodle), Top Cat, Wally Gator, Touché Turtle and Dum Dum, Lippy the Lion and Hardy Har Har and The Jetsons soon followed in 1961 and 1962. Several animated television commercials were produced as well, often starring their own characters (including the Pebbles cereal commercials for Post) and the opening credits for Bewitched, in which animated caricatures of Samantha and Darrin appeared. These characterizations were reused in The Flintstones' sixth-season episode "Samantha".

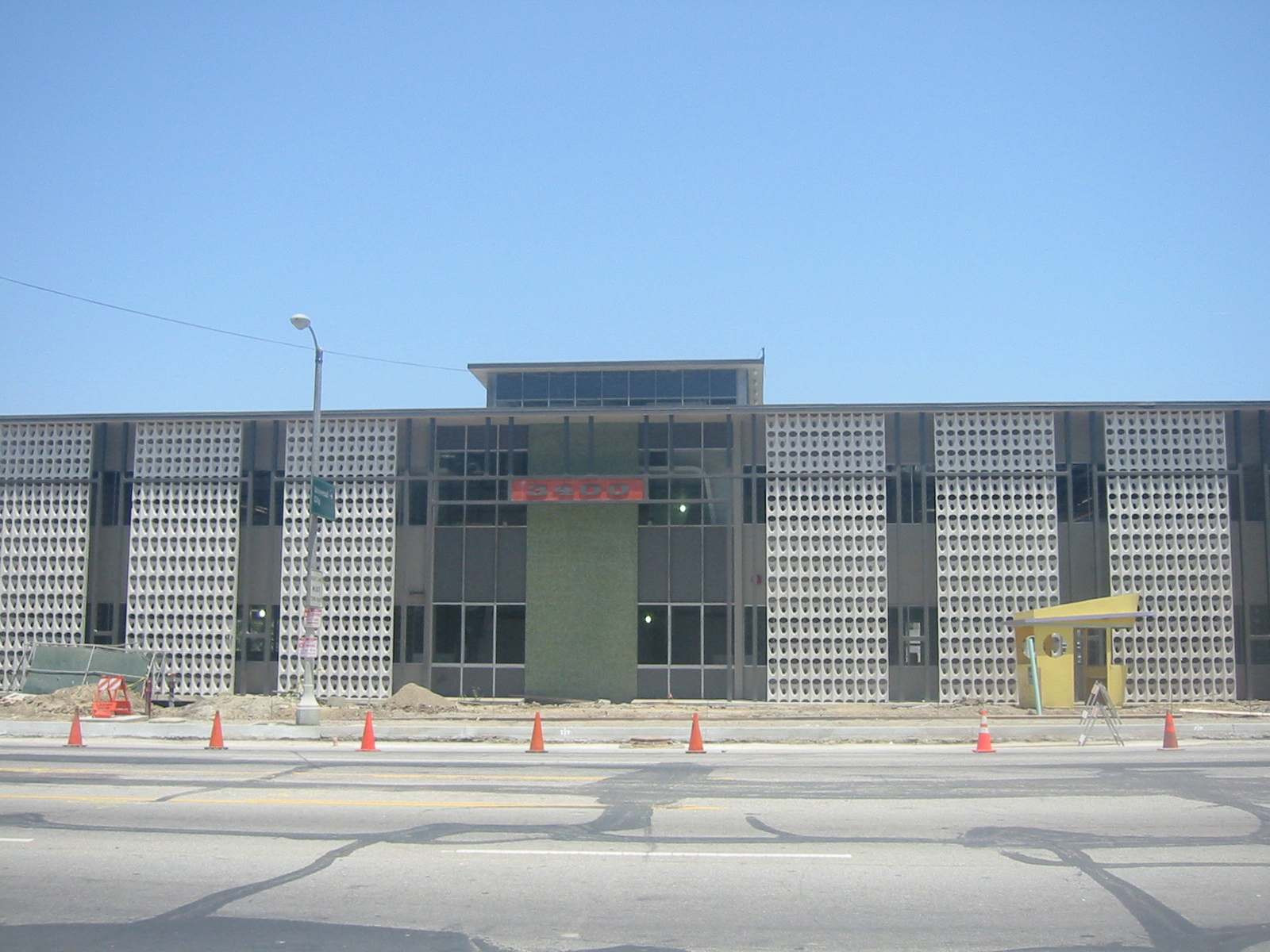
The former Hanna-Barbera building at 3400 Cahuenga Boulevard West in Hollywood, seen in a 2007 photograph. The small yellow structure (lower right) was originally the "guard shack" for the property entrance to the east of the building.

In 1963, Hanna-Barbera's operations moved to 3400 Cahuenga Boulevard West in Hollywood Hills/Studio City. This contemporary office building was designed by architect Arthur Froehlich. Its ultra-modern design included a sculpted latticework exterior, moat, fountains, and a Jetsons-like tower. The Magilla Gorilla Show, Jonny Quest, The Peter Potamus Show, Atom Ant and Secret Squirrel followed in 1964 and 1965.

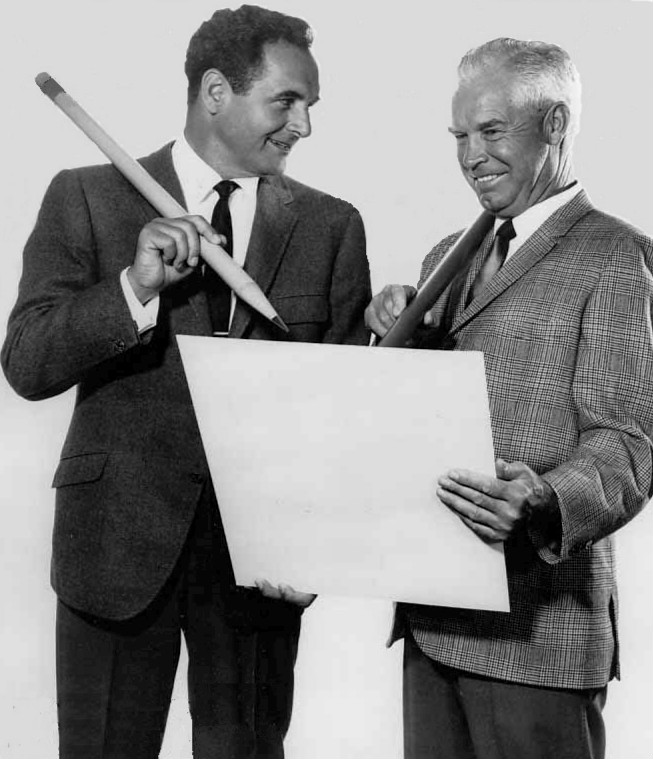
William Hanna (right) and Joseph Barbera (left) seen in a 1965 photograph

The partnership with Screen Gems would last until 1965 when Hanna and Barbera announced the sale of their studio to Taft Broadcasting. Taft's acquisition of Hanna-Barbera was delayed for a year by a lawsuit from Cohn's family, wife Joan Perry and sons John and Harrison Cohn, who felt the studio undervalued the Cohns' 18% share in when it was sold a few years previously.

In 1966, Frankenstein Jr. and The Impossibles and Space Ghost debuted, and by December of that year the litigation had been settled, Taft finally acquired Hanna-Barbera for $12 million and folded the studio into its corporate structure in 1967 and 1968, becoming its distributor. Hanna and Barbera stayed on while Screen Gems retained licensing and distribution rights to their previous produced cartoons and trademarks to the characters into the 1970s and 1980s.

Shazzan, The Banana Splits, Wacky Races, Dastardly and Muttley in Their Flying Machines, The Perils of Penelope Pitstop and Cattanooga Cats followed from 1967 to 1969. The studio's record and music label, Hanna-Barbera Records, was headed by Danny Hutton and distributed by Columbia. Children's records featuring its characters were released by Colpix. Hanna-Barbera teamed up with the National Catholic Office for Radio and Television to produce 26 half-hour animated films in 1970, which never materialized.

Scooby-Doo, Where Are You! debuted on CBS on September 13, 1969; it is a mystery-based program which blended comedy, action, and elements from I Love a Mystery and The Many Loves of Dobie Gillis. For two seasons, it centered on four teenagers and a dog solving supernatural mysteries, and became one of Hanna-Barbera's most successful creations, spawning several new spin-offs, such as The New Scooby-Doo Movies, Scooby-Doo and Scrappy-Doo and many others, which were regularly in production at Hanna-Barbera into the 1990s.

=== Spin-offs, mysteries and more (1970–1979) ===
Referred to as "The General Motors of animation", Hanna-Barbera produced nearly two-thirds of all Saturday-morning cartoons in a single year. Josie and the Pussycats, The Funky Phantom, The Amazing Chan and the Chan Clan, Speed Buggy, Butch Cassidy and the Sundance Kids, Goober and the Ghost Chasers, Inch High, Private Eye, Clue Club, Jabberjaw, Captain Caveman and the Teen Angels and The New Shmoo built upon the mystery-solving template set by Scooby-Doo, with further shows built around teenagers solving mysteries with a comic relief pet of some sort.

Starting in 1971, many new spin-offs, such as The Pebbles and Bamm-Bamm Show, featuring Fred and Barney's now teenaged children along with The Flintstone Comedy Hour, The Tom and Jerry Show, The New Fred and Barney Show and "all-star" shows Yogi's Gang, Laff-A-Lympics, Yogi's Space Race and Galaxy Goof-Ups came to the airwaves.

Hanna-Barbera teamed up with Avco Broadcasting Corporation in 1971, a company that was once a rival to its owner Taft at that time, who maintains rivalry in the Columbus and Cincinnati markets, to produce two holiday specials for the syndicated market by way of its syndicated division. In 1972, H-B opened an animation studio in Australia, with the Hamlyn Group acquiring a 50% stake in 1974.

Hamlyn was acquired by James Hardie Industries. Hanna-Barbera Australia bought itself out from Hardie and Taft in 1988, changing its name to Southern Star Group, since becoming Endemol Shine Australia, a division of Banijay Entertainment. Super Friends, an action-adventure show adapted from DC Comics' Justice League of America and the first of many iterations of the Super Friends series, premiered on ABC on September 8, 1973. It returned to production in 1976, remaining on ABC through 1985 with The All-New Super Friends Hour, Challenge of the Superfriends and The World's Greatest Super Friends.

While Help!... It's the Hair Bear Bunch!, Sealab 2020, Wait Till Your Father Gets Home and Hong Kong Phooey aired, Charlotte's Web, an adaptation of the novel of the same name, (Note: Theatrical distribution rights currently owned by Skydance Motion Picture Group (through Paramount Pictures and Hanna-Barbera).) was released on March 1, 1973, by Paramount Pictures, to moderate critical and commercial success, and was the first of only four Hanna-Barbera films not to be based upon one of their famous television cartoons (the other three being C.H.O.M.P.S., Heidi's Song and Once Upon a Forest).

With the majority of American television animation during the second half of the 20th century made by Hanna-Barbera and more cartoons like CB Bears, Buford and the Galloping Ghost, The All New Popeye Hour, Godzilla and Casper and the Angels, major competition was coming from Filmation and DePatie–Freleng. Then-ABC president Fred Silverman gave its Saturday-morning time to them after dropping Filmation for its failure of Uncle Croc's Block.

New live-action material was produced, as well as new live-action/animated combos since the mid-1960s. In 1975, former MGM executive Herbert F. Solow joined the company to start a live-action unit, Hanna-Barbera Television, to produce prime time programming, which later spun off and became Solow Production Company in 1976.

Along with the animation industry in the U.S., it moved away from producing in-house in the late 1970s and early 1980s. While The Great Grape Ape Show and The Mumbly Cartoon Show aired, Ruby and Spears worked with Hanna-Barbera in 1976 and 1977 as ABC network executives to create and develop new cartoons before leaving in 1977 to start their company, Ruby-Spears Enterprises, with Filmways as its parent division. In 1979, Taft bought Worldvision Enterprises, which became Hanna-Barbera's new distributor.

=== The Smurfs dominance and control decrease (1980–1991) ===
Super Friends, The Fonz and the Happy Days Gang, Richie Rich, The Flintstone Comedy Show, Space Stars, The Kwicky Koala Show, Trollkins and Laverne and Shirley in the Army debuted in 1980 and 1981, while Taft purchased Ruby-Spears from Filmways (which was eventually absorbed into Orion Pictures the following year), making it a sister company to Hanna-Barbera and as a result, several early-1980s series were shared between both companies.

While Filmation, Sunbow Productions, Marvel Productions, Rankin/Bass, DIC and other Hollywood animation studios introduced successful animated series syndicated, including some based on licensed properties, Hanna-Barbera fell behind, as it no longer dominated the television animation market as it did years earlier and lost control over children's programming, going down from 80% to 20%.

The Smurfs, adapted from the Belgian comic by Peyo and centering on a group of tiny blue creatures led by Papa Smurf, debuted on NBC on September 12, 1981, and ran for nine seasons until December 2, 1989, becoming so the longest-running Saturday-morning cartoon series in broadcast history, a significant ratings success, the top-rated program in eight years and the highest for an NBC show since 1970. The Gary Coleman Show, Shirt Tales, Pac-Man, The Little Rascals, The Dukes, Monchhichis and The Biskitts followed in 1982 and 1983.

Following a 1982 strike, new cartoons were outsourced to Cuckoo's Nest Studios, Mr. Big Cartoons, Toei Animation and Fil-Cartoons in Australia and Asia, which provided production services from 1982 to the end of H-B's existence. Challenge of the GoBots, Pink Panther and Sons, Super Friends: The Legendary Super Powers Show, Snorks, The New Scooby & Scrappy-Doo Show, The New Scooby-Doo Mysteries, Yogi's Treasure Hunt, Galtar and the Golden Lance, Paw Paws, The Super Powers Team: Galactic Guardians and The 13 Ghosts of Scooby-Doo debuted in 1984 and 1985.

While new revivals of The Jetsons, Jonny Quest and Yogi Bear were commissioned for broadcast, Pound Puppies, The Flintstone Kids, Foofur, Wildfire, Sky Commanders and Popeye and Son arrived in 1986 and 1987. After its financial troubles affected Hanna-Barbera, the American Financial Corporation acquired Taft in 1987 and renamed it Great American Broadcasting. A Pup Named Scooby-Doo, The Completely Mental Misadventures of Ed Grimley, Fantastic Max, The Further Adventures of SuperTed and Paddington Bear followed in 1988 and 1989.

In 1986, the company opened a Polish branch, Hanna-Barbera Poland, which handled marketing and distribution for television and VHS in Poland. At the same time, they entered into a partnership with Polish studio Studio Filmów Rysunkowych to outsource select productions, such as The Flintstone Kids.

In January 1989, Hanna-Barbera launched an in-house Home Video division, Hanna-Barbera Home Video. This deal was made following the sale of Worldvision by Great American to Aaron Spelling Productions. In the same month, while working on A Pup Named Scooby-Doo, Tom Ruegger got a call from Warner Bros. to resurrect its animation department.

Ruegger, along with several of his colleagues, left Hanna-Barbera at that time to develop Tiny Toon Adventures at Warner Bros. David Kirschner, known for An American Tail and Child's Play, was later appointed as the studio's new CEO. Later that year, the company had a licensing agreement with MicroIllusions, a video game publisher, to produce video games based on its properties, namely Jonny Quest and others.

In 1990, Kirschner confirmed his plans to turn Hanna-Barbera into "Another Walt Disney Company" with a major expansion in its offerings, including the opening of a live-action division called Bedrock Productions, the operations of self-owned retail stores, additional licensing agreements, the opening of an attraction at Universal Studios Florida, and an increased focus in the television syndication market.

Cartoons that had premiered that year included Midnight Patrol: Adventures in the Dream Zone, Rick Moranis in Gravedale High, Tom & Jerry Kids, Bill and Ted's Excellent Adventures, The Adventures of Don Coyote and Sancho Panda and Wake, Rattle, and Roll, while The Pirates of Dark Water, Yo Yogi! and Young Robin Hood would follow in 1991.

=== Acquisition period and studio's demise (1991–2001) ===
On July 18, 1991, MCA Inc. had talks with the struggling Great American Communications about purchasing the studio for $175 million. However, the two companies were uncertain whether to reach a deal over the latter's existing distribution agreement with Worldvision for the H-B catalogue. Two days later on 20 July, Great American Communications officially announced that they were considering putting Hanna-Barbera up for sale, with The Walt Disney Company as another interested partner.

At the end of August, Turner Broadcasting System (which was co-producing Tom & Jerry Kids with Hanna-Barbera) reported that they were also interested in purchasing the studio. Disney's then-CEO Michael Eisner later admitted that not buying Hanna-Barbera was his biggest regret.

On October 29, 1991, Turner Broadcasting System officially announced that under a 50/50 venture with Apollo Global Management, they would purchase Hanna-Barbera Productions for $320 million, outbidding MCA and Hallmark Cards. Turner stated that if the deal went through, they would use the Hanna-Barbera library to launch a dedicated animation cable network.

The purchase included company's 3,000 half-hour library, the production and animation facilities, and the acquisition of distribution rights from Worldvision Enterprises. The catalogue of sister company Ruby-Spears Enterprises was also included in the sale, but not the studio itself, which would split off from Great American as an independent company called RS Holdings. As a result, its home video division, Hanna-Barbera Home Video was absorbed into Turner Home Entertainment.

Shortly after the sale in 1992, the company was taken into a new direction, with a renaming to H-B Production Co., while Scott Sassa hired Fred Seibert to head Hanna-Barbera, who filled the gap left by Great American's crew with new animators, directors, producers and writers, including Craig McCracken, Donovan Cook, Genndy Tartakovsky, David Feiss, Seth MacFarlane, Van Partible and Butch Hartman. After that David Kirschner and producing partner Paul Gertz had left in 1993 to resume his independent producing status at 20th Century Fox alongside Michael Jackson under a three year deal. Its feature animation unit, who was producing Once Upon a Forest, was transformed into Turner Feature Animation during production of The Pagemaster.

1992 saw the broadcast of Capitol Critters and Fish Police, two prime-time animated sitcoms that attempted to copy the success of Fox's The Simpsons to little success. Turner's planned animation cable network, Cartoon Network, launched on October 1 as the first 24-hour all-animation channel, with Hanna-Barbera as a core contributor to the channel's launch lineup.

In 1993, the company again renamed itself to Hanna-Barbera Cartoons, Inc. (though the Hanna-Barbera Productions name was still used in regards to the pre-1992 properties) That year, 2 Stupid Dogs, SWAT Kats: The Radical Squadron and Droopy, Master Detective would premiere. The company would also take over production of Captain Planet and the Planeteers from DIC Enterprises, which was renamed to The New Adventures of Captain Planet. On December 30, Turner acquired Apollo Investment Fund's stake in the studio for $255 million, putting Hanna-Barbera under their full control.

In 1995, an animated series based on the hit New Line Cinema film Dumb and Dumber premiered as the final Hanna-Barbera series created for mainstream television. From that point onwards, Turner would refocus the studio to produce content exclusively for Cartoon Network, with What a Cartoon! being launched by Seibert to allow the company's new animators a chance to create their own shows. The first series to spin off from What a Cartoon! would be Dexter's Laboratory, which premiered in 1996.

Also that year, the high-budgeted The Real Adventures of Jonny Quest premiered on the channel, while the short-lived Cave Kids was syndicated to public television stations. In 1997, the studio produced two more series spun off from What a Cartoon!: Johnny Bravo and Cow and Chicken. That year, the Hanna-Barbera studio faced demolition after many of its staff vacated the facilities, despite the efforts to preserve it.

In 1998, following the premiere of The Powerpuff Girls, Hanna-Barbera moved from Cahuenga Blvd. to Sherman Oaks Galleria in Sherman Oaks, California, where Warner Bros. Animation was located. I Am Weasel would be its final show in 1999. After the company's absorption into Warner Bros. Animation in 2001, Hanna died of throat cancer on March 22, at the age of 90 years old.

=== Post-closure and Barbera's final years (2001–2006) ===
Logo used on Warner Bros.-branded Hanna-Barbera material since 2001

While Cartoon Network Studios took over production of programming, the Los Angeles City Council approved a plan to preserve the Cahuenga Blvd. headquarters in May 2004, while allowing retail and residential development on the site.

Barbera died of natural causes on December 18, 2006, at the age of 95. Warner Bros. Animation has continued to produce new productions based on Hanna-Barbera properties since then.

== Production ==
=== Production process changes ===
The small budgets that television animation producers had to work within prevented Hanna-Barbera from working with the full theatrical-quality animation that Hanna and Barbera had been known for at Metro-Goldwyn-Mayer. While the budget for MGM's seven-minute Tom and Jerry shorts was about $35,000, the Hanna-Barbera studios were required to produce five-minute Ruff and Reddy episodes for no more than $3,000 apiece. To keep within these tighter budgets, Hanna-Barbera furthered the concept of limited animation (also called "planned animation") practiced and popularized by the United Productions of America (UPA) studio, which also once had a partnership with Columbia Pictures. Character designs were simplified, and backgrounds and animation cycles (walks, runs, etc.) were regularly re-purposed.

Characters were often broken up into a handful of levels so that only the parts of the body that needed to be moved at a given time (i.e. a mouth, an arm, a head) were animated. The rest of the figure remained on a held animation cel. This allowed a typical seven-minute short to be done with only nearly 2,000 drawings instead of the usual 14,000. Dialogue, music, and sound effects were emphasized over action, leading Chuck Jones—a contemporary who worked for Warner Bros. Cartoons and whose short The Dover Boys practically invented many of the concepts in limited animation—to disparagingly refer to the limited television cartoons produced by Hanna-Barbera and others as "illustrated radio".

In a story published by The Saturday Evening Post in 1961, critics stated that Hanna-Barbera was taking on more work than it could handle and was resorting to shortcuts only a television audience would tolerate. An executive who worked for Walt Disney Productions said, "We don't even consider [them] competition". Animation historian Christopher P. Lehman argues that Hanna-Barbera attempted to maximize their bottom line by recycling story formulas and characterization instead of introducing new ones. Once a formula for an original series was deemed successful, the studio reused it in subsequent series. Besides copying their own works, Hanna-Barbera drew inspiration from the works of other people and studios.

Lehman considers that the studio served as the main example of how animation studios that focused on TV animation differed from those that focused on theatrical animation. Theatrical animation studios tried to maintain full and fluid animation and consequently struggled with the rising expenses associated with producing it. Limited animation as practiced by Hanna-Barbera kept production costs at a minimum. The cost in quality of using this technique was that Hanna-Barbera's characters only moved when necessary.

Its solution to the criticism over its quality was to go into films. It produced six theatrical feature films, among them are higher-quality versions of its television cartoons and adaptations of other material. It was also one of the first animation studios to have their work produced overseas. One of these companies was a subsidiary began by Hanna-Barbera in November 1987 called Fil-Cartoons in the Philippines, with Jerry Smith as a consultant for the subsidiary. Wang Film Productions got its start as an overseas facility for the studio in 1978.

=== Digital innovation ===
Hanna-Barbera was among the first animation studios to incorporate digital tools into their pipeline. As early as the 1970s, they experimented with using Scanimate, a video synthesizer, to create an early form of digital cutout style. A clip of artists using the machine to manipulate scanned images of Scooby-Doo characters, scaling and warping the artwork to simulate animation, is available at the Internet Archive.

Likewise, Hanna-Barbera was perhaps the first proponent of digital ink and paint, a process wherein animators' drawings were scanned into computers and colored using software. Led by Marc Levoy, Hanna-Barbera began developing a computerized digital ink and paint system in 1979 to help bypass much of the time-consuming labor of painting and photographing cels. The process was implemented on a third of Hanna-Barbera's animated programs, televised feature films and specials from 1982 through 1996.

=== Sound effects ===
Hanna-Barbera was known for its large library of sound effects that modern audiences are now used to, which have been featured in exhibitions at the Norman Rockwell Museum.

== Ownership ==
After Hanna-Barbera's partnership with Screen Gems ended in 1966, it was sold to Taft Broadcasting, where it remained its owner until 1991 when Turner Broadcasting System acquired the company and its library for its flagship network, Cartoon Network. In 1996, Turner merged with Time Warner. As of 2026, Skydance owns the Hanna-Barbera archive through its subsidiary, Warner Bros. Entertainment.

== See also ==
- Animation in the United States in the television era
- Boomerang
- Golden age of American animation
- Hanna-Barbera Classic Collection
- Hanna-Barbera in amusement parks
- Laugh track
- List of animation studios owned by Warner Bros. Discovery
- List of films based on Hanna-Barbera cartoons
- List of Hanna-Barbera characters
- List of Hanna-Barbera–based video games

== Bibliography ==
- Barbera, Joseph (1994). My Life in 'Toons: From Flatbush to Bedrock in Under a Century. Atlanta, GA: Turner Publishing. ISBN 1-57036-042-1.
- Barrier, Michael (2003). Hollywood Cartoons: American Animation in Its Golden Age. Oxford University Press. ISBN 978-0-19-802079-0.
- Burke, Timothy; Burke, Kevin (1998). Saturday Morning Fever: Growing up with Cartoon Culture. New York: St. Martin's Griffin. ISBN 0-312-16996-5.
- Hanna, William (1999). A Cast of Friends. New York: Da Capo Press. ISBN 0-306-80917-6.
- Lawrence, Guy (2006). Yogi Bear's Nuggets: A Hanna-Barbera 45 Guide. Spectropop.com.
- Lehman, Christopher P. (2007). "The Cartoons of 1961–1962". American Animated Cartoons of the Vietnam Era: A Study of Social Commentary in Films and Television Programs, 1961–1973. McFarland & Company. ISBN 978-0-7864-5142-5.
