= List of works produced by Hanna-Barbera =

This is a list of animated television series, made-for-television films, direct-to-video films, theatrical short subjects, and feature films produced by Hanna-Barbera (also known as Hanna-Barbera Productions, H-B Enterprises, H-B Production Co. and Hanna-Barbera Cartoons). Note that some shows or new spin-offs of shows may be listed twice. Productions by Hanna-Barbera won eight Emmy Awards. In 2001, Warner Bros. Animation took over function of Hanna-Barbera following founder William Hanna's death, where Joseph Barbera remained an executive producer.

For subsequent productions featuring Hanna-Barbera-created characters, see Cartoon Network Studios and Warner Bros. Animation.

Key for below: = Won the Emmy Award.

== Television shows ==
#	Show	Creator(s) / Developer(s)	Original run	Co-production with	Notes	Episodes	Includes laugh track	Original network
	1950s							
1	The Ruff and Reddy Show	William Hanna; Joseph Barbera	1957–1960		First series to be produced by Hanna-Barbera.	156 episodes	❌	NBC
2	The Huckleberry Hound Show: Huckleberry Hound; Pixie and Dixie and Mr. Jinks; Yogi Bear (1958–60); Hokey Wolf (1960–61)	William Hanna; Joseph Barbera	1958–1961		Yogi Bear was spun off into its own series in 1960; Hokey Wolf took its place at that time.; First animated series to win an Emmy Award.	68 episodes	❌	Syndication
3	The Quick Draw McGraw Show: Quick Draw McGraw; Augie Doggie and Doggie Daddy; Snooper and Blabber	William Hanna; Joseph Barbera	1959–1961			45 episodes	❌	Syndication
	1960s							
4	The Flintstones	William Hanna; Joseph Barbera	1960–1966		First prime-time series with a 30-minute sitcom format in the history of television.; First pregnancy in animation history with Wilma Flintstone seen in maternity clothes.; First Hanna-Barbera animated series to use a laugh track.	166 episodes	✔️	ABC
5	The Yogi Bear Show: Yogi Bear; Snagglepuss; Yakky Doodle	William Hanna; Joseph Barbera	1961–1962		Spin-off of The Huckleberry Hound Show.	33 episodes	❌	Syndication
6	Top Cat	William Hanna; Joseph Barbera	1961–1962		Prime-time series.	30 episodes	✔️	ABC
7	The Hanna-Barbera New Cartoon Series: Wally Gator; Touché Turtle and Dum Dum; Lippy the Lion and Hardy Har Har	William Hanna; Joseph Barbera	1962–1963		Package series.	52 episodes (each segment)	❌	Syndication
8	The Jetsons	William Hanna; Joseph Barbera	1962–1963		Prime-time series	24 episodes	✔️	ABC
9	The Magilla Gorilla Show: Magilla Gorilla; Ricochet Rabbit & Droop-a-Long; Punkin' Puss & Mushmouse	William Hanna; Joseph Barbera	1964–1967		Ricochet Rabbit & Droop-a-Long was eventually moved to The Peter Potamus Show.	31 episodes	❌	Syndication
10	Jonny Quest	Doug Wildey	1964–1965		Prime-time series on ABC.; First fully realized action adventure animated series on American television.	26 episodes	❌	ABC
11	The Peter Potamus Show: Peter Potamus and So-So; Breezly and Sneezly; Yippee, Yappee and Yahooey	Jerry Eisenberg; William Hanna; Joseph Barbera	1964–1966		Breezly and Sneezly was eventually moved to The Magilla Gorilla Show.	27 episodes	❌	Syndication
12	The Atom Ant/Secret Squirrel Show: Atom Ant; The Hillbilly Bears; Precious Pupp; Secret Squirrel and Morocco Mole; Squiddly Diddly; Winsome Witch	William Hanna; Joseph Barbera	1965–1967		First Hanna-Barbera series since The Ruff and Reddy Show created for Saturday morning television.; Atom Ant, The Hillbilly Bears and Precious Pupp were later aired as segments on The Atom Ant Show and Secret Squirrel and Morocco Mole, Squiddly Diddly and Winsome Witch were later aired as segments on The Secret Squirrel Show. All six segments were aired in The Banana Splits Adventure Hour after it went into syndication.; Both shows split off separately during their second season.	26 episodes (each segment)	❌	NBC
13	Sinbad Jr. and His Magic Belt	Sam Singer	1965–1966	American International Television	Animated adaptation of Sinbad the Sailor.; First animated series from Hanna-Barbera based on a licensed property.; First co-production with outside studio.	102 episodes	❌	Syndication
14	Laurel and Hardy	Larry Harmon	1966–1967	Larry Harmon Pictures; Wolper Productions	Animated adaptation of Laurel and Hardy.	39 episodes (156 segments)	❌	NBC
15	Frankenstein Jr. and The Impossibles: Frankenstein Jr.; The Impossibles	* The Impossibles: Michael Maltese	1966–1967			18 episodes	❌	CBS
16	Space Ghost and Dino Boy: Space Ghost; Dino Boy in the Lost Valley	Alex Toth	1966–1967			20 episodes	❌	CBS
17	The Space Kidettes	William Hanna; Joseph Barbera	1966–1967		In syndication, episodes were paired with Young Samson and aired as The Space Kidettes and Young Samson.	20 episodes	❌	NBC
18	We'll Take Manhattan		1967		Pilot of an unrealized live-action comedy TV series on NBC starring Dwayne Hickman and Ben Blue that only aired on April 30, 1967.		❌	NBC
19	The Abbott and Costello Cartoon Show	Lee Orgel	1967–1968	RKO Pictures Company; Jomar Productions	Animated adaptation of Abbott and Costello with the voice of Bud Abbott.	39 episodes (156 shorts)	❌	Syndication
20	Birdman and the Galaxy Trio: Birdman; The Galaxy Trio	Alex Toth	1967–1968			20 episodes	❌	NBC
21	The Herculoids	Alex Toth	1967–1968			18 episodes	❌	CBS
22	Shazzan	Alex Toth	1967–1968			18 episodes	❌	CBS
23	The Fantastic Four		1967–1968	Marvel Comics	Based on the comic book series of the same name.	20 episodes	❌	ABC
24	Moby Dick and Mighty Mightor: Moby Dick; Mighty Mightor		1967–1968		Animated loose adaptation of Moby-Dick.	18 episodes	❌	CBS
25	Samson & Goliath	William Hanna; Joseph Barbera	1967–1968		Aired as Young Samson in 1968.; In syndication, episodes were paired with The Space Kidettes and aired as The Space Kidettes and Young Samson.	20 episodes	❌	NBC
26	The World: Color It Happy	William Hanna; Joseph Barbera	1967		An unsold television pilot.		❌	N/A
27	The Banana Splits Adventure Hour: The Banana Splits; Arabian Knights; The Three Musketeers; Micro Ventures; Danger Island (live-action)	Hanna-Barbera	1968–1970		Combined live-action and animated segments.; Danger Island was exclusively live-action.; The Banana Splits was live-action.; Arabian Knights was an animated version of the work of the same name from Middle Eastern literature.; The Three Musketeers was an animated adventure based on the novel of the same name by Alexandre Dumas.	31 episodes	✔️ (The Banana Splits segments) ❌ (Other segments)	NBC
28	The New Adventures of Huckleberry Finn		1968–1969		The first live-action/animated series in television history, and one of the most expensive of its time.; Based on the novel The Adventures of Huckleberry Finn by Mark Twain.	20 episodes	❌	NBC
29	The Adventures of Gulliver		1968–1969		Based on the novel Gulliver's Travels by Jonathan Swift.	17 episodes	❌	ABC
30	Wacky Races	William Hanna; Joseph Barbera	1968–1969	Heatter-Quigley Productions	Originally developed as a game show.	34 episodes	❌	CBS
31	The Perils of Penelope Pitstop	William Hanna; Joseph Barbera	1969–1970		Spin-offs of Wacky Races.	17 episodes	❌	CBS
32	Dastardly and Muttley in Their Flying Machines: Wing Dings; Magnificent Muttley	William Hanna; Joseph Barbera	1969–1970		Spin-offs of Wacky Races.	17 episodes	❌	CBS
33	Cattanooga Cats: Cattanooga Cats; Around the World in 79 Days; It's the Wolf!; Motormouse and Autocat	William Hanna; Joseph Barbera	1969–1971			17 episodes	❌	ABC
34	Scooby-Doo, Where Are You!	Joe Ruby; Ken Spears	1969–1978		First Hanna-Barbera Saturday morning animated TV series to use a laugh track.	41 episodes	✔️	CBS (seasons 1–2); ABC (season 3)
	1970s							
35	Where's Huddles?	William Hanna; Joseph Barbera	1970		Prime-time series.	10 episodes	✔️	CBS
36	Harlem Globetrotters	Joe Ruby; Ken Spears	1970–1971	CBS Productions	Animated series based on the exhibition basketball team of the same name.	22 episodes	✔️	CBS
37	Josie and the Pussycats	Dan DeCarlo; John Goldwater; Richard Goldwater	1970–1971	Radio Comics	Based on the comic book series of the same name.	16 episodes	✔️	CBS
38	The Pebbles and Bamm-Bamm Show	William Hanna; Joseph Barbera	1971–1972		Spin-off of The Flintstones.	16 episodes	✔️	CBS
39	Help!... It's the Hair Bear Bunch!	Joe Ruby; Ken Spears	1971–1972			16 episodes	✔️	CBS
40	The Funky Phantom	William Hanna; Joseph Barbera	1971–1972	Air Programs International	The first Hanna-Barbera series animated in Australia by API.	17 episodes	✔️	ABC
41	Duffy's Dozen	William Hanna; Joseph Barbera	1971		Unsold animated television pitch.		❌	N/A
42	The Amazing Chan and the Chan Clan	Sidney Morse	1972		Based on the Charlie Chan detective film series.	16 episodes	✔️	CBS
43	Wait Till Your Father Gets Home	R.S. Allen; Harvey Bullock	1972–1974		First-run syndicated series.	48 episodes	✔️	Syndication
44	The Flintstone Comedy Hour: The Bedrock Rockers	William Hanna; Joseph Barbera	1972–1973		Aired in reruns as The Flintstone Comedy Show in 1973–74.; Spin-off of The Flintstones and The Pebbles and Bamm-Bamm Show.	16 episodes	✔️	CBS
45	The Roman Holidays	William Hanna; Joseph Barbera	1972			13 episodes	✔️	NBC
46	Sealab 2020	Alex Toth	1972			15 episodes	❌	NBC
47	The New Scooby-Doo Movies	Joe Ruby; Ken Spears	1972–1973		Spin-off of Scooby-Doo, Where Are You!.; First series to bring weekly celebrity voices to Saturday morning cartoons.	24 episodes	✔️	CBS
48	Josie and the Pussycats in Outer Space	Dan DeCarlo; John Goldwater; Richard Goldwater	1972		Spin-off of Josie and the Pussycats.	16 episodes	✔️	CBS
49	Speed Buggy	William Hanna; Joseph Barbera	1973			16 episodes	✔️	CBS
50	Butch Cassidy and the Sundance Kids		1973			13 episodes	❌	NBC
51	Yogi's Gang	William Hanna; Joseph Barbera	1973		Crossover series featuring characters from The Huckleberry Hound Show, The Quick Draw McGraw Show, The Yogi Bear Show, The Hanna-Barbera New Cartoon Series, The Magilla Gorilla Show, The Peter Potamus Show, The Atom Ant Show, and The Secret Squirrel Show.	15 episodes	✔️	ABC
52	Super Friends		1973	National Periodical Publications	Based on DC Comics characters.	16 episodes	❌	ABC
53	Goober and the Ghost Chasers		1973		Crossover with The Partridge Family.	16 episodes	✔️	ABC
54	Inch High, Private Eye	William Hanna; Joseph Barbera	1973			13 episodes	✔️	NBC
55	Jeannie	Sidney Morse	1973	Screen Gems	Animated adaptation of I Dream of Jeannie.	16 episodes	✔️	CBS
56	The Addams Family	David Levy	1973		Animated adaptation of the 1960s sitcom by the same name.	16 episodes	✔️	NBC
57	Hong Kong Phooey	William Hanna; Joseph Barbera	1974			16 episodes	✔️	ABC
58	Devlin	Norman Katkov	1974			16 episodes	❌	ABC
59	Partridge Family 2200 A.D.	Sidney Morse	1974–1975	Columbia Pictures Television	Animated adaptation of The Partridge Family.	16 episodes	✔️	CBS
60	These Are the Days	Ed Jurist	1974–1975			16 episodes	❌	ABC
61	Valley of the Dinosaurs	Samuel Roeca	1974			16 episodes	❌	CBS
62	Wheelie and the Chopper Bunch		1974–1975			13 episodes	✔️	NBC
63	Korg: 70,000 B.C.	Fred Freiberger	1974–1975		Live-action TV series.	19 episodes	❌	ABC
64	The Tom & Jerry/Grape Ape/Mumbly Show: The Tom & Jerry Show (1975); The Great Grape Ape Show (1975); The Mumbly Cartoon Show (1976–77)	William Hanna; Joseph Barbera	1975–1977	MGM Television (The Tom & Jerry Show)	Aired as The Tom & Jerry/Grape Ape Show (1975–76), The Tom & Jerry/Grape Ape/Mumbly Show (1976) and The Tom & Jerry/Mumbly Show (1976–77).; Based on the Tom and Jerry theatrical shorts.	16 episodes (each segment)	The Tom & Jerry Show: ❌ The Great Grape Ape Show: ✔️	ABC
65	The Scooby-Doo/Dynomutt Hour: The Scooby-Doo Show; Dynomutt, Dog Wonder	* The Scooby-Doo Show: Joe Ruby; Ken Spears; Ray Parker * Dynomutt, Dog Wonder: Joe Ruby; Ken Spears	1976–1977		Spin-off of Scooby-Doo, Where Are You!.	20 episodes (each segment)	✔️	ABC
66	Clue Club		1976			16 episodes	❌	CBS
67	Jabberjaw	Joe Ruby; Ken Spears	1976			16 episodes	✔️	ABC
68	Taggart's Treasure		1976		Pilot of an unrealized live-action TV series produced in Australia, and only aired on ABC in the United States on December 31, 1976.		❌	ABC
69	Fred Flintstone and Friends: The Flintstone Comedy Hour; The Bedrock Rockers; Goober and the Ghost Chasers; Jeannie; Partridge Family 2200 A.D.; The Pebbles and Bamm-Bamm Show; Yogi's Gang		1977–1978	Columbia Pictures Television; Claster Television Productions	Package series that includes re-runs of The Flintstone Comedy Hour, Goober and the Ghost Chasers, Jeannie, Partridge Family 2200 A.D., The Pebbles and Bamm-Bamm Show and Yogi's Gang.; Spin-off of The Flintstones.	95 episodes	✔️	Syndication
70	Scooby's All-Star Laff-A-Lympics: Captain Caveman and the Teen Angels; Laff-A-Lympics; The Scooby-Doo Show; Scooby-Doo, Where Are You!; The Blue Falcon and Dynomutt	Joe Ruby; Ken Spears	1977–1978		Aired as Scooby's All-Stars in the 1978–1979 season.; Laff-A-Lympics is a crossover series featuring characters from The Huckleberry Hound Show, The Quick Draw McGraw Show, The Flintstones, The Yogi Bear Show, The Hanna-Barbera New Cartoon Series, The Peter Potamus Show, The Atom Ant/Secret Squirrel Show, Scooby-Doo, Where Are You!/The Scooby-Doo Show, The Great Grape Ape Show, The Mumbly Cartoon Show, Dynomutt, Dog Wonder, Captain Caveman and the Teen Angels, Speed Buggy, Hong Kong Phooey, Jeannie and Jabberjaw.	24 episodes	Laff-A-Lympics: ❌ The rest: ✔️	ABC
71	CB Bears: The CB Bears; Blast-Off Buzzard; Heyyy, It's the King!; Posse Impossible; Shake, Rattle and Roll; Undercover Elephant	William Hanna; Joseph Barbera	1977–1978		In syndication, CB Bears aired in a half-hour version with Blast-Off Buzzard and Posse Impossible.; In syndication, Heyyy, It's the King! also aired in a half-hour version with Shake, Rattle and Roll and Undercover Elephant.	13 episodes (each segment)	❌	NBC
72	The Skatebirds: The Skatebirds; The Robonic Stooges; Wonder Wheels; Woofer & Wimper, Dog Detectives; Mystery Island (live-action)	* The Robonic Stooges: Norman Maurer	1977–1978		Live-action/animated TV series.; The Robonic Stooges was an animated adaptation of The Three Stooges.; Woofer & Wimper was an edited version of Clue Club.	16 episodes	❌	CBS
73	The All-New Super Friends Hour: The Wonder Twins	Norman Maurer	1977–1978	DC Comics	Spin-off of Super Friends.	15 episodes	❌	ABC
74	The Beach Girls		1977		Pilot of an unrealized live-action comedy TV series starring Rita Wilson.		❌	N/A
75	The Hanna-Barbera Happy Hour		1978		Live-action prime-time variety series	5 episodes	❌	NBC
76	The Funny World of Fred and Bunni		1978		Pilot of an unrealized live-action/animated prime-time variety series starring Fred Travalena, and aired on CBS on August 30, 1978.		❌	CBS
77	The All New Popeye Hour: Popeye; Popeye's Treasure Hunt (1978–80); Dinky Dog (1978–80); The Popeye Sports Parade (1979–80); Prehistoric Popeye (1981–83); Private Olive Oyl (1981–83)	Larz Bourne	1978–1983	King Features Syndicate	Spin-off of the Popeye theatrical cartoons; Aired as The Popeye and Olive Comedy Show in the 1981–1983 season.	56 episodes	❌	CBS
78	Yogi's Space Race: Yogi's Space Race; Galaxy Goof-Ups; Buford and the Galloping Ghost; The Buford Files; The Galloping Ghost	William Hanna; Joseph Barbera	1978		Yogi's Space Race was a crossover series featuring characters from The Huckleberry Hound Show, The Yogi Bear Show and Jabberjaw.; Galaxy Goof-Ups was a crossover series featuring characters from The Huckleberry Hound Show and The Yogi Bear Show.	13 episodes (each series)	❌	NBC
79	Challenge of the Superfriends		1978	DC Comics	Spin-off of Super Friends.	16 episodes	❌	ABC
80	The Godzilla Power Hour: Godzilla; Jana of the Jungle	* Godzilla: Dick Robbins; Duane Poole * Jana of the Jungle: Doug Wildey; Dick Robbins; Duane Poole	1978–1981	Toho	Animated adaptation of Godzilla.	26 episodes (Godzilla), 13 episodes (Jana of the Jungle)	❌	NBC
81	Go Go Globetrotters		1978		Combined reruns of Harlem Globetrotters with Space Ghost, The Herculoids and CB Bears.		Space Ghost, The Herculoids and CB Bears:❌ Harlem Globetrotters:✔️	NBC
82	The New Fred and Barney Show	William Hanna; Joseph Barbera	1979		Spin-off of The Flintstones	17 episodes	✔️	NBC
83	Fred and Barney Meet the Thing: The New Fred and Barney Show; The Thing		1979	Marvel Comics (The Thing)	Animated adaptation of the Marvel Comics character The Thing.; Spin-off of The Flintstones.	13 episodes	The New Fred and Barney Show:✔️ The Thing:❌	NBC
84	Sergeant T.K. Yu	Gordon Dawson	1979		Pilot of an unrealized live-action TV crime drama series starring Johnny Yune, and aired on NBC on January 24, 1979.		❌	NBC
85	America vs. the World		1979		Pilot of an unrealized live-action TV series hosted by Ed McMahon and Georgia Engel, and aired on NBC on February 13, 1979.		❌	NBC
86	Casper and the Angels	Bob Ogle	1979	The Harvey Entertainment Company	Based on Casper the Friendly Ghost, licensed through Harvey Comics.	13 episodes	✔️	NBC
87	The New Shmoo	Len Janson; Chuck Menville	1979		Animated adaptation of the Shmoo from Lil' Abner.	16 episodes	❌	NBC
88	The Super Globetrotters	Andy Heyward	1979	Saperstein Productions	Spin-off of Harlem Globetrotters.	13 episodes	✔️	NBC
89	Scooby-Doo and Scrappy-Doo	Joe Ruby; Ken Spears; Mark Evanier	1979–1980		The first version of Scooby-Doo and Scrappy-Doo.; Spin-off of Scooby-Doo, Where Are You!.	16 episodes	✔️	ABC
90	The World's Greatest Super Friends		1979–1980	DC Comics	Spin-off of Super Friends.	8 episodes	❌	ABC
91	Fred and Barney Meet the Shmoo: The New Fred and Barney Show; The New Shmoo		1979–1980		Animated adaptation of the Shmoo from Lil' Abner.; Spin-off of The Flintstones.; Final Hanna-Barbera Saturday morning TV series to have a laugh track.		The New Fred and Barney Show:✔️ The New Shmoo:❌	NBC
92	Amigo and Friends	Mario Moreno Reyes	1979–1982	Televisa	Animated adaptation of Mexican movie star Cantinflas.; Also known as Cantinflas y Sus Amigos in Spain.; Hanna-Barbera-produced English dub.	52 episodes	❌	Syndication
	1980s							
93	The B.B. Beegle Show	Dick Robbins; Duane Poole	1980		Pilot of an unrealized live-action/puppet TV series with Joyce DeWitt and Arte Johnson, and began airing on January 7, 1980, in syndication. The pilot reran a few times throughout 1980.		❌	Syndication
94	Super Friends		1980–1983	DC Comics	Spin-off of Super Friends.	22 episodes	❌	ABC
95	Drak Pack	Cliff Roberts	1980	Southern Star		16 episodes	❌	CBS
96	Hanna–Barbera's World of Super Adventure: Birdman and the Galaxy Trio; Birdman; The Galaxy Trio; Fantastic Four; Frankenstein Jr. and The Impossibles; Frankenstein Jr.; The Impossibles; The Herculoids; Moby Dick and Mighty Mightor; Moby Dick; Mighty Mightor; Shazzan; Space Ghost and Dino Boy; Space Ghost; Dino Boy in the Lost Valley		1980–1984		Syndicated rerun package series featuring Birdman and the Galaxy Trio, Fantastic Four, Frankenstein Jr. and The Impossibles, The Herculoids, Moby Dick and Mighty Mightor, Shazzan and Space Ghost and Dino Boy.		❌	Syndication
97	The Flintstone Comedy Show: The Flintstone Family Adventures; Bedrock Cops; Pebbles, Dino and Bamm-Bamm; Captain Caveman; Dino and Cavemouse; The Frankenstones	William Hanna; Joseph Barbera	1980–1981		Spin-off of The Flintstones, The Pebbles and Bamm-Bamm Show, Captain Caveman and the Teen Angels, and The New Shmoo.; Syndicated as Flintstone Frolics internationally.	18 episodes	❌	NBC
98	The Fonz and the Happy Days Gang	Duane Poole; Tom Swale	1980–1981	Paramount Television	Animated adaptation of Happy Days.	24 episodes	❌	ABC
99	The Richie Rich/Scooby-Doo Show: Richie Rich; Scooby-Doo and Scrappy-Doo	* Scooby-Doo and Scrappy-Doo: Joe Ruby; Ken Spears * Richie Rich: Norman Maurer	1980–1981	The Harvey Entertainment Company (Richie Rich)	Spin-off of Scooby-Doo and Scrappy-Doo.; Animated adaptation of Richie Rich comic book series.	33 episodes (Scooby-Doo and Scrappy-Doo), 41 episodes (Richie Rich)	❌	ABC
100	Laverne & Shirley in the Army	Duane Poole; Tom Swale	1981–1982	Paramount Television	Animated adaptation of Laverne & Shirley.	13 episodes	❌	ABC
101	Space Stars: Teen Force; Astro and the Space Mutts; Space Ghost (new episodes); The Herculoids (new episodes); Space Stars Finale		1981–1982			11 episodes	❌	NBC
102	The Kwicky Koala Show: Kwicky Koala; The Bungle Brothers; Crazy Claws; Dirty Dawg	Tex Avery	1981		The show was Tex Avery's final animated project before his death.	16 episodes	❌	CBS
103	Trollkins	Hank Saroyan	1981–1982			13 episodes	❌	CBS
104	The Smurfs: Johan and Peewit	Peyo	1981–1989	SEPP International S.A. (seasons 1–7); Lafig S.A. (seasons 8–9)	Based on the comic series of the same name.	256 episodes	❌	NBC
105	The Flintstone Funnies: The Flintstone Family Adventures; Bedrock Cops; Pebbles, Dino and Bamm-Bamm; Captain Caveman; Dino and Cavemouse; The Frankenstones		1982–1984		Repackaged half-hour version The Flintstone Comedy Show.; Spin-off of The Flintstones.		❌	NBC
106	The Pac-Man/Little Rascals/Richie Rich Show: Pac-Man; The Little Rascals; Richie Rich	* The Little Rascals: Dick Robbins; Bryce Malek * Pac-Man: Jeffrey Scott	1982–1983	King World Productions	Animated adaptation of Little Rascals and Pac-Man; Richie Rich rerun.	13 episodes	❌	ABC
107	Mork & Mindy/Laverne & Shirley/Fonz Hour: Mork & Mindy; Laverne & Shirley with The Fonz	* Mork & Mindy: Norman Maurer * Laverne & Shirley with The Fonz: Duane Poole; Tom Swale	1982–1983	Ruby-Spears Enterprises (Mork & Mindy); Paramount Television	Spin-off of The Fonz and the Happy Days Gang and Laverne & Shirley in the Army; Animated adaptation of Mork & Mindy written and voiced at Hanna-Barbera and animation produced by Ruby-Spears.	26 episodes (Mork & Mindy), 8 episodes (Fonz/Laverne & Shirley)	❌	ABC
108	The Scooby & Scrappy-Doo/Puppy Hour: Scooby-Doo and Scrappy-Doo; Scrappy and Yabba-Doo; The Puppy's New Adventures		1982	Ruby-Spears Enterprises	Spin-off of Scooby-Doo and Scrappy-Doo; The "Puppy" character is based on Ruby-Spears' animated adaptation of The Puppy Who Wanted a Boy, which in turn is based on the book by Jane Thayer.; Hanna-Barbera co-produced The Puppy's New Adventures with Ruby-Spears in 1982; these segments were later aired in 1983 as The Puppy's Further Adventures, made solely by Ruby-Spears and without Hanna-Barbera.		❌	ABC
109	Jokebook	Harry Love	1982		Compilation show mostly made up from non-HB material such as classic cartoons and foreign cartoons.; Final Hanna-Barbera TV series production to use a laugh track.	7 episodes (4 unaired)	✔️	NBC
110	Shirt Tales	Bob Ogle	1982–1983		Based on characters created by Janet Elizabeth Manco for Hallmark greeting cards.	23 episodes	❌	NBC
111	The Gary Coleman Show	Cliff Roberts	1982		Based on the 1982 TV movie The Kid with the Broken Halo which starred Gary Coleman.	13 episodes	❌	NBC
112	The Dukes	Ray Parker	1983	Warner Bros. Television	Animated adaptation of The Dukes of Hazzard.	20 episodes	❌	CBS
113	The Monchhichis/Little Rascals/Richie Rich Show: Monchhichis; The Little Rascals; Richie Rich	* Monchhichis: Dick Robbins; Bryce Malek	1983–1984	King World Productions	Animated adaptation of Monchhichi.	13 episodes	❌	ABC
114	The Pac-Man/Rubik, the Amazing Cube Hour: Pac-Man; Rubik, the Amazing Cube		1983–1984	Ruby-Spears Enterprises	Animated adaptation of Rubik's Cube.	13 episodes	❌	ABC
115	The New Scooby and Scrappy-Doo Show: The New Scooby-Doo Mysteries	Joe Ruby; Ken Spears; Tom Ruegger	1983–1984		Aired as The New Scooby-Doo Mysteries in the 1984–1985 season.; Spin-off of Scooby-Doo, Where Are You! and Scooby-Doo and Scrappy-Doo.	26 episodes	❌	ABC
116	The Biskitts	Duane Poole; Tom Swale	1983			13 episodes	❌	CBS
117	Benji, Zax & the Alien Prince	Len Janson; Chuck Menville	1983	Mulberry Square Productions	Live-action series based on the film franchise created by Joe Camp.	13 episodes	❌	CBS
118	Going Bananas	Len Janson; Chuck Menville	1984		Live-action series.	12 episodes	❌	NBC
119	Lucky Luke	Morris	1984–1985	Gaumont; Lucky Comics; Extrafilm Produktion	Based on the comic series of the same name.	26 episodes	❌	Syndication
120	Snorks	Nic Broca	1984–1989	SEPP International S.A.	Based on the comic book of same name.	65 episodes	❌	NBC
121	Scary Scooby Funnies		1984–1985		Repackaged reruns from The Richie Rich/Scooby-Doo Show.	20 episodes	❌	ABC
122	Challenge of the GoBots	Jeff Segal	1984–1985	Tonka	Animated adaptation of the GoBots.	65 episodes	❌	Syndication
123	Pink Panther and Sons	David H. DePatie; Friz Freleng	1984–1985	Mirisch-Geoffrey-DePatie-Freleng; MGM/UA Television	Spin-off of the Pink Panther theatrical cartoons.	26 episodes	❌	NBC
124	Super Friends: The Legendary Super Powers Show		1984–1985	DC Comics	Spin-off of Super Friends.	8 episodes	❌	ABC
125	Paw Paws		1985–1986			21 episodes	❌	Syndication
126	Yogi's Treasure Hunt	William Hanna; Joseph Barbera	1985–1988		Crossover series featuring characters from The Huckleberry Hound Show, The Quick Draw McGraw Show, The Yogi Bear Show, Top Cat, Wacky Races, The Ruff and Reddy Show, The Hanna-Barbera New Cartoon Series, The Magilla Gorilla Show, The Peter Potamus Show, The Atom Ant Show, The Secret Squirrel Show, Jabberjaw and CB Bears.	27 episodes	❌	Syndication
127	Galtar and the Golden Lance	Neal Barbera	1985–1986			21 episodes	❌	Syndication
128	The Jetsons		1985–1987			51 episodes	❌	Syndication
129	The Super Powers Team: Galactic Guardians	E. Nelson Bridwell; Carmine Infantino	1985	DC Comics	Spin-off of Super Friends.	8 episodes (10 segments)	❌	ABC
130	The 13 Ghosts of Scooby-Doo	Mitch Schauer; Tom Ruegger	1985		Spin-off of Scooby-Doo, Where Are You! and Scooby-Doo and Scrappy-Doo	13 episodes	❌	ABC
131	Scooby's Mystery Funhouse		1985–1986		Repackaged reruns from The Richie Rich/Scooby-Doo Show, The Scooby & Scrappy-Doo/Puppy Hour and The New Scooby and Scrappy-Doo Show.	21 episodes	❌	ABC
132	The Berenstain Bears	Joe Cates	1985–1986	Southern Star	Animated adaptation of the Berenstain Bears children's books.	52 episodes	❌	CBS
133	CBS Storybreak		1985–1989	Southern Star; CBS Entertainment Productions		26 episodes	❌	CBS
134	The Funtastic World of Hanna-Barbera		1985–1994		Live-action/animated syndicated programming block featuring a superstar line-up of both old and new Hanna-Barbera shows.		❌	Syndication
135	Teen Wolf	Gordon Kent	1986–1987	Southern Star; Clubhouse Pictures (season 1); Atlantic/Kushner-Locke (season 2)	Animated adaptation of the 1985 live-action film Teen Wolf.	21 episodes	❌	CBS
136	The New Adventures of Jonny Quest		1986–1987		Spin-off of Jonny Quest	13 episodes	❌	Syndication
137	Pound Puppies		1986–1987		Animated adaptation of Pound Puppies.	26 episodes	❌	ABC
138	The Flintstone Kids: The Flintstone Kids; Flintstone Funnies; Dino's Dilemmas; Captain Caveman and Son	William Hanna; Joseph Barbera	1986–1987		Spin-off of The Flintstones and Captain Caveman and the Teen Angels.	36 episodes	❌	ABC
139	Foofur	Phil Mendez	1986–1987	SEPP International S.A.		26 episodes	❌	NBC
140	Wildfire	Jeff Segal; Kelly Ward	1986	Wang Film Productions; Cuckoo's Nest Studio		13 episodes	❌	CBS
141	Sky Commanders	Jeff Segal	1987	Toei Animation	Based on the toy line by Kenner Toys Inc.	13 episodes	❌	Syndication
142	Popeye and Son	Jeff Segal; Kelly Ward; John Loy	1987	King Features Entertainment	Spin-off of the Popeye theatrical cartoons.	13 episodes	❌	CBS
143	Skedaddle	William Hanna; Joseph Barbera	1988		Live-action game show aired as part of The Funtastic World of Hanna-Barbera.		❌	Syndication
144	A Pup Named Scooby-Doo	Tom Ruegger	1988–1991		Spin-off of Scooby-Doo, Where Are You!.	27 episodes	❌	ABC
145	The Completely Mental Misadventures of Ed Grimley	John Hays	1988	SEPP International S.A.	Animated adaptation of Martin Short's Ed Grimley character.	13 episodes	❌	NBC
146	The New Yogi Bear Show	William Hanna; Joseph Barbera	1988		Spin-off of The Yogi Bear Show.	45 episodes	❌	Syndication
147	Fantastic Max	Judy Rothman Rofé; Robin Lyons; Mike Young	1988–1990	Booker PLC; Kalisto Ltd. Tanaka Promotion Co., Ltd. (season 2)		26 episodes	❌	Syndication
148	The Further Adventures of SuperTed	Mike Young; David Edwards	1989	S4C; Siriol Animation	Spin-off of SuperTed.	13 episodes	❌	Syndication
149	Paddington Bear	Gordon Kent	1989–1990	Central Independent Television	Animated adaptation of Paddington Bear.	13 episodes	❌	Syndication
	1990s							
150	Bill & Ted's Excellent Adventures	Gordon Kent	1990	Orion Television Entertainment; Nelson Entertainment	Season 1.; Season 2 was produced by DIC Enterprises.; Animated adaptation of Bill & Ted's Excellent Adventure.	13 episodes	❌	CBS (season 1); Fox (season 2)
151	The Adventures of Don Coyote and Sancho Panda		1990–1991	RAI - Radiotelevisione Italiana (RAIUNO)	Based on the novel Don Quixote.	26 episodes	❌	Syndication
152	Tom & Jerry Kids Show: Tom & Jerry Kids; Droopy and Dripple; Spike and Tyke; Blast-Off Buzzard; Urfo & Buzz; Wildmouse; Slowpoke Antonio; Swampy Fox and the Gator Brothers; Bernie Bird; Kyle the Cat; Mouse Scouts; Calaboose Cal	Joseph Barbera; Don Jurwich	1990–1993	Turner Entertainment Co.	Spin-off of the Tom and Jerry and Droopy theatrical cartoons.	65 episodes	❌	Fox
153	Wake, Rattle, and Roll: Basement Tech; Monster Tails; Fender Bender 500	David Kirschner	1990–1991	Four Point Entertainment	Fourth and final Hanna-Barbera's live-action/animated TV series.; The Basement Tech segment is only in live-action.; The Fender Bender 500 segment is a spin-off of Wacky Races, as well as a crossover series featuring characters from The Huckleberry Hound Show, The Quick Draw McGraw Show, The Yogi Bear Show, Top Cat, The Hanna-Barbera New Cartoon Series, The Magilla Gorilla Show, The Secret Squirrel Show, and Wacky Races.	50 episodes	❌	Syndication
154	Gravedale High	David Kirschner; Ernie Contreras; Glenn Leopold	1990	NBC Productions	Animated series starring Rick Moranis.	13 episodes	❌	NBC
155	Midnight Patrol: Adventures in the Dream Zone	Martin Powell; Vivien Schrager-Powell	1990	Sleepy Kids PLC	Known as Potsworth & Co. outside the U.S.	13 episodes	❌	Syndication
156	The Pirates of Dark Water	David Kirschner	1991–1993			21 episodes	❌	ABC
157	Yo Yogi!	Sean Roche	1991		Crossover series featuring characters from The Huckleberry Hound Show, The Quick Draw McGraw Show, The Yogi Bear Show, Top Cat, The Hanna-Barbera New Cartoon Series, The Magilla Gorilla Show, The Peter Potamus Show, The Atom Ant Show, The Secret Squirrel Show, Wacky Races and CB Bears.	13 episodes	❌	NBC
158	Young Robin Hood		1991	CINAR; France Animation; Antenne 2	Based on the legend of Robin Hood.	26 episodes	❌	Syndication
159	Fish Police	Jeanne Romano	1992		Prime-time series.; Animated adaptation of the comic series of same name.	6 episodes	❌	CBS
160	Capitol Critters	Nat Mauldin; Steven Bochco; Michael Wagner	1992	Steven Bochco Productions; 20th Century Fox Television	Final prime-time series from Hanna-Barbera.	13 episodes	❌	ABC
161	The Addams Family	Bill Matheny; Lane Raichert	1992–1993		Second animated adaptation of The Addams Family, after the 1973 version.; Based on The Addams Family film.	21 episodes	❌	ABC
162	Droopy, Master Detective: Droopy; Screwball Squirrel; Wild Mouse; Lightning Bolt the Super Squirrel	Joseph Barbera; Don Jurwich	1993	Turner Entertainment Co.	Spin-off of the Droopy theatrical cartoons.	13 episodes	❌	Fox
163	The New Adventures of Captain Planet	Ted Turner; Barbara Pyle	1993–1996		Seasons 4–6.; Seasons 1–3 were produced by DIC Entertainment as Captain Planet and the Planeteers.	48 episodes	❌	TBS
164	2 Stupid Dogs: 2 Stupid Dogs; Super Secret Secret Squirrel	Donovan Cook	1993–1995		Super Secret Secret Squirrel is a reboot of The Secret Squirrel Show.	26 episodes	❌	TBS
165	SWAT Kats: The Radical Squadron	Christian Tremblay; Yvon Tremblay; Glenn Leopold; Davis Doi	1993–1995			25 episodes	❌	TBS
166	What a Cartoon!	Fred Seibert	1995–1997		A series of shorts, including ones that are television pilots to some Cartoon Network shows such as Cow and Chicken and The Powerpuff Girls.	48 episodes	❌	Cartoon Network
167	Dumb and Dumber	Bennett Yellin	1995–1996	New Line Television	Animated adaptation of Dumb and Dumber.; Final Hanna-Barbera-produced show to air on broadcast network television.	13 episodes	❌	ABC
168	Dexter's Laboratory: Dexter's Laboratory; Dial M for Monkey; The Justice Friends	Genndy Tartakovsky	1996–2003		Seasons 1–2.; Hanna-Barbera produced season 1 using "Cartoon Network Studios" as an in-name only division.; Seasons 3–4 were produced by Cartoon Network Studios as a separate entity of its former parent company.; The series was introduced as What a Cartoon! shorts.; Only The Justice Friends segments from season 1 use a laugh track, as it is presented much like a sitcom.; All shows from this point onward were broadcast on Cartoon Network.	52 episodes	❌	Cartoon Network
169	The Real Adventures of Jonny Quest	Peter Lawrence; Takashi Masunaga	1996–1997		Spin-off of Jonny Quest.; Only Jonny Quest-related TV show to be broadcast on Cartoon Network.	52 episodes	❌	Cartoon Network, TBS, TNT
170	Cave Kids	Russell Hicks	1996		Spin-off of The Flintstones.; Final Hanna-Barbera-produced show to air in syndication.	8 episodes	❌	Syndication
171	Johnny Bravo	Van Partible	1997–2004		Seasons 1–3.; Season 4 was produced by Cartoon Network Studios as a separate entity of its former parent company.; The series was introduced as What a Cartoon! shorts.	65 episodes	❌	Cartoon Network
172	Cow and Chicken: Cow and Chicken; I Am Weasel	David Feiss	1997–1999		The series was introduced as a What a Cartoon! short.	52 episodes	❌	Cartoon Network
173	I Am Weasel	David Feiss	1997–2000		Spin-off of Cow and Chicken.	79 episodes	❌	Cartoon Network
174	The Powerpuff Girls	Craig McCracken	1998–2005		Seasons 1–4.; Final show produced by Hanna-Barbera.; Seasons 5–6 were produced by Cartoon Network Studios as a separate entity of its former parent company.; The series was introduced as What a Cartoon! shorts.	49 episodes	❌	Cartoon Network

== Television films and specials ==
=== The ABC Saturday Superstar Movie ===
Hanna-Barbera produced the following television movies for The ABC Saturday Superstar Movie:

Title	Directed by	Air date	Co-production with	Notes
Yogi's Ark Lark	Joseph Barbera; William Hanna	September 16, 1972		Pilot for Yogi's Gang.; Contains a laugh track.
Oliver and the Artful Dodger	Joseph Barbera; William Hanna	October 21 and 28, 1972		Sequel to Oliver Twist by Charles Dickens.
The Adventures of Robin Hoodnik	Joseph Barbera; William Hanna	November 4, 1972		Based on the legend of Robin Hood.; Contains a laugh track.
Gidget Makes the Wrong Connection	Joseph Barbera; William Hanna	November 18, 1972	Screen Gems	Based on the live-action sitcom Gidget.
The Banana Splits in Hocus Pocus Park	Tom Boutross (live-action); Charles A. Nichols (animation)	November 25, 1972		Featuring characters from The Banana Splits; Contains a laugh track.
Tabitha and Adam and the Clown Family	Joseph Barbera; William Hanna	December 2, 1972	Screen Gems	Based on the live-action sitcom Bewitched.
Lost in Space	Charles A. Nichols	September 8, 1973	20th Century Fox Television	Based on the live-action science fiction series Lost in Space.

=== ABC Afterschool Specials ===
Hanna-Barbera produced the following television movies / specials for the ABC Afterschool Special series:

Episode	Directed by	Air date	Synopsis
Last of the Curlews	Joseph Barbera; William Hanna	October 4, 1972	Animated special about a father and son who go hunting, and debate whether or not to kill an Eskimo curlew, which may become (and may now be) extinct.
Cyrano	Charles A. Nichols	March 6, 1974	Animated special about Cyrano de Bergerac (voice of José Ferrer) who helps an army officer woo Roxanne (voice of Joan Van Ark), the woman Cyrano himself loves.
The Runaways	John Florea	March 27, 1974	Live-action special about a small-town teenage girl (Belinda Balaski) who teams up with a younger but wiser boy for survival.
The Crazy Comedy Concert	Alan Handley; Vincent McEveety	June 5, 1974	Live-action/animated special (starring Tim Conway and Ruth Buzzi) geared to educate young people about classical music.
It Isn't Easy Being a Teenage Millionaire	Richard C. Bennett	March 8, 1978	Live-action special about a 14-year-old girl (Victoria Paige Meyerink) who wins the lottery and thinks all her problems are over, but quickly learns that her real problems are just beginning.
The Gymnast	Larry Elikann	October 28, 1980	Live-action special about Ginny (Holly Gagnier), a 16-year-old gymnast who is determined to become a world-class athlete.

=== Famous Classic Tales ===
Hanna-Barbera's Australian division produced the following CBS television specials for the Famous Classic Tales series:

Title	Directed by	Air date	Notes
The Count of Monte Cristo	Joseph Barbera; William Hanna	September 23, 1973	Based on the novel of the same name by Alexandre Dumas.
Twenty Thousand Leagues Under the Sea	Joseph Barbera; William Hanna	November 22, 1973	Based on the novel of the same name by Jules Verne.
The Three Musketeers	Joseph Barbera; William Hanna	November 23, 1973	Based on the novel of the same name by Alexandre Dumas.
The Last of the Mohicans	Charles A. Nichols	November 27, 1975	Based on the novel of the same name by James Fenimore Cooper.
Davy Crockett on the Mississippi	Charles A. Nichols	November 20, 1976	Based on the legend of Davy Crockett.
Five Weeks in a Balloon	Chris Cuddington	November 24, 1977	Based on the novel of the same name by Jules Verne.
Black Beauty	Chris Cuddington	October 28, 1978	Based on the novel of the same name by Anna Sewell.
Gulliver's Travels	Chris Cuddington	November 18, 1979	Based on the novel of the same name by Jonathan Swift.
Daniel Boone	Geoff Collins	November 27, 1981	Based on the legend of Daniel Boone.

=== ABC Weekend Specials ===
Hanna-Barbera and Hanna-Barbera's Australian division produced the following television movies / specials for the ABC Weekend Special series:

Title	Directed by	Air date	Notes
The Secret World of Og	Steve Lumley	April 30 - May 14, 1983	Based on the novel of the same name by Pierre Berton.
The Bunjee Venture	Steve Lumley	March 24 - 31, 1984	Based on the novel The Bunjee Venture by Stan McMurtry.
The Return of Bunjee	Steve Lumley	April 6 - 13, 1985	Based on the novel The Bunjee Venture by Stan McMurtry.
The Velveteen Rabbit	Chris Cuddington	April 20, 1985	Based on the book of the same name by Margery Williams.
Monster in My Pocket: The Big Scream	Don Lusk	October 31, 1992	Based on the toyline created by Morrison Entertainment Group.

=== Hanna-Barbera Superstars 10 ===
Hanna-Barbera Superstars 10 was a series of 10 syndicated telefilms made from 1987 to 1988 in conjunction with Worldvision Enterprises, featuring some of the most popular Hanna-Barbera characters in feature-length adventures. All 10 films are available on VHS, DVD, and Blu-ray.

Title	Directed by	Air date
Yogi's Great Escape	Bob Goe; Paul Sommer; Rudy Zamora	September 20, 1987
Scooby-Doo Meets the Boo Brothers	Paul Sommer; Carl Urbano	October 18, 1987
The Jetsons Meet the Flintstones	Don Lusk	November 15, 1987
Yogi Bear and the Magical Flight of the Spruce Goose	John Kimball; Art Davis; Rudy Zamora; Jay Sarbry; Oscar Dufau; Paul Sommers	November 22, 1987
Top Cat and the Beverly Hills Cats	Paul Sommer; Charles A. Nichols	March 20, 1988
The Good, the Bad, and Huckleberry Hound	Bob Goe; John Kimball; Charles A. Nichols; Jay Sarbry	May 6, 1988
Rockin' with Judy Jetson	Paul Sommer	September 18, 1988
Scooby-Doo and the Ghoul School	Charles A. Nichols	October 16, 1988
Scooby-Doo and the Reluctant Werewolf	Ray Patterson	November 13, 1988
Yogi and the Invasion of the Space Bears	Don Lusk	November 20, 1988

=== The Flintstones Primetime Specials ===
Hanna-Barbera produced the following NBC television specials as part of The Flintstone Primetime Specials, the penultimate Hanna-Barbera production overall to contain a laugh track and also the final Hanna-Barbera production overall to contain one produced by the studio, a limited-run prime-time revival of The Flintstones:

Title	Directed by	Air date
The Flintstones' New Neighbors	Carl Urbano	September 26, 1980
The Flintstones: Fred's Final Fling	Oscar Dufau; Ray Patterson	November 7, 1980
The Flintstones: Wind-Up Wilma	Carl Urbano	October 4, 1981
The Flintstones: Jogging Fever	Ray Patterson	October 11, 1981

=== The Smurfs prime-time specials ===
Hanna-Barbera also produced the following NBC prime-time television specials based on The Smurfs:

Title	Directed by	Air date	Co-production with
Here Comes the Smurfs		June 19, 1981	SEPP International S.A.
The Smurfs Springtime Special	Gerard Baldwin	April 8, 1982	SEPP International S.A.
The Smurfs Christmas Special	Gerard Baldwin	December 12, 1982	SEPP International S.A.
My Smurfy Valentine	Gerard Baldwin	February 13, 1983	SEPP International S.A.
The Smurfic Games	Gerard Baldwin	May 20, 1984	SEPP International S.A.
Smurfily Ever After	Gerard Baldwin	February 13, 1985	SEPP International S.A.
'Tis the Season to Be Smurfy	Ray Patterson	December 13, 1987	SEPP International S.A.

=== Other animated specials and telefilms ===
Hanna-Barbera also produced the following specials:

Title	Directed by	Air date	Channel	Co-production(s)	Notes
Magilla Gorilla: Here Comes a Star	Arthur Pierson	1964	Syndication	Ideal Toy Corporation	Introduction to The Magilla Gorilla Show
The World of Atom Ant and Secret Squirrel	Joseph Barbera; William Hanna	September 12, 1965	NBC	Screen Gems	Introduction to The Atom Ant/Secret Squirrel Show
Alice in Wonderland or What's a Nice Kid Like You Doing in a Place Like This?	Alex Lovy	March 30, 1966	ABC	Screen Gems	Featuring cameos by Fred Flintstone and Barney Rubble. Final program produced with Screen Gems before the sale to Taft.
Jack and the Beanstalk	Gene Kelly	February 26, 1967	NBC		Live action/animated.
The Thanksgiving That Almost Wasn't	Joseph Barbera; William Hanna	November 21, 1972	Syndication	Avco Broadcasting Corporation	
A Christmas Story	Joseph Barbera; William Hanna	December 9, 1972	Syndication	Avco Broadcasting Corporation	
The Flintstones on Ice	Walter C. Miller	February 11, 1973	CBS		Based on The Flintstones.
Silent Night, Holy Night	Peter Luschwitz	December 15, 1976	Syndication		
Yabba Dabba Doo! The Happy World of Hanna-Barbera	Marshall Flaum	November 24, 1977	CBS		Live action/animated (host: Gene Kelly).
A Flintstone Christmas	Charles A. Nichols	December 7, 1977	NBC		Based on The Flintstones.; First Christmas special to contain a laugh track.
Hanna-Barbera's All-Star Comedy Ice Revue	Walter C. Miller	January 13, 1978	CBS	deFaria Productions	Live action/animated (hosts: Roy Clark and Bonnie Franklin); Based on The Flintstones and featuring characters from The Yogi Bear Show, The Huckleberry Hound Show, The Quick Draw McGraw Show, The Hanna-Barbera New Cartoon Series, The Banana Splits, Jabberjaw, Hong Kong Phooey, Help!... It's the Hair Bear Bunch! and The Skatebirds.
The Flintstones: Little Big League	Chris Cuddington	April 6, 1978	NBC		Based on The Flintstones.; Contains a laugh track.
The Popeye Show	Ray Patterson; Carl Urbano	September 13, 1978	CBS	King Features Syndicate	Four segments from The All New Popeye Hour: "Spinach Fever", "Popeye Out West", "A Bad Knight for Popeye" and "Wilder Than Usual Blue Yonder".
The Popeye Valentine Special: Sweethearts at Sea	Oscar Dufau	February 14, 1979	CBS	King Features Syndicate	Based on The All New Popeye Hour.
The Hanna-Barbera Hall of Fame: Yabba Dabba Doo II	Robert Guenette	October 12, 1979	CBS	Robert Guenette Productions	Live action/animated (host: Bill Bixby).
The Flintstones Meet Rockula and Frankenstone	Ray Patterson	October 30, 1979	NBC		Based on The Flintstones.; Contains a laugh track.
Casper's Halloween Special	Carl Urbano	October 30, 1979	NBC	The Harvey Entertainment Company	Based on Casper and the Angels.; Contains a laugh track.
Casper's First Christmas	Carl Urbano	December 18, 1979	NBC	The Harvey Entertainment Company	Based on Casper and the Angels and featuring characters from The Huckleberry Hound Show, The Quick Draw McGraw Show and The Yogi Bear Show.; Final Christmas special to contain a laugh track.
Scooby Goes Hollywood	Ray Patterson	December 23, 1979	ABC		Based on Scooby-Doo, Where Are You!.; Only Scooby-Doo telefilm to contain a laugh track.
The Harlem Globetrotters Meet Snow White	Oscar Dufau; Carl Urbano	September 27, 1980	NBC	Saperstein Productions	Based on Harlem Globetrotters.; Originally aired in four segments on Fred and Barney Meet the Shmoo.
Yogi's First Christmas	Ray Patterson; Rudy Cataldi (uncredited)	November 21, 1980	Syndication		Based on The Yogi Bear Show and featuring characters from The Huckleberry Hound Show and The Quick Draw McGraw Show.
The Funtastic World of Hanna-Barbera Arena Show	Keith Mackenzie	June 25, 1981	NBC		Live action/animated (host: Michael Landon).; Featuring characters from The Flintstones, The Yogi Bear Show, The Jetsons, The Huckleberry Hound Show, Top Cat and Scooby-Doo, Where Are You!.
Pac-Man Halloween Special	George Gordon; Bill Hutten; Bob Hathcock; Carl Urbano; Rudy Zamora	October 30, 1982	ABC		Based on Pac-Man.
Christmas Comes to Pac-Land	Ray Patterson	December 16, 1982	ABC		Based on Pac-Man.
Yogi Bear's All Star Comedy Christmas Caper	Steve Lumley	December 21, 1982	CBS		Based on The Yogi Bear Show and featuring characters from The Huckleberry Hound Show, The Quick Draw McGraw Show, The Flintstones, The Hanna-Barbera New Cartoon Series and The Magilla Gorilla Show.
The Daltons on the Loose	Morris; Joseph Barbera; William Hanna; Ray Patterson	1983	Syndication	Gaumont	Based on Lucky Luke.
We Think the World Is Round	Rudy Larriva	October 1, 1984	HBO	Jellybean Productions; Rainbow Seven Productions	Produced in the 1970s, but did not air until 1984.; Distributed by Hanna-Barbera.
Pound Puppies	Alan Zaslove	October 26, 1985	Syndication	Tonka	Based on the toy line of the same name.
Star Fairies	Ray Patterson	October 26, 1985	Syndication	Tonka	Based on the toy line of the same name.
The Flintstones' 25th Anniversary Celebration	Robert Guenette	May 20, 1986	CBS	Robert Guenette Productions	Live action/animated (hosts: Tim Conway, Harvey Korman and Vanna White).; Based on The Flintstones.
Rock Odyssey	Joseph Barbera; William Hanna; Robert Taylor (uncredited)	July 13, 1987	ABC		
The Little Troll Prince	Ray Patterson	November 27, 1987	Syndication		
The Flintstone Kids' "Just Say No" Special	Carl Urbano	September 15, 1988	ABC		Based on The Flintstone Kids.
Hanna-Barbera's 50th: A Yabba Dabba Doo Celebration	Marshall Flaum	July 17, 1989	TNT	Marshall Flaum Production	Live action/animated (hosts: Tony Danza and Annie Potts).; Featuring characters from Tom and Jerry, The Ruff and Reddy Show, The Huckleberry Hound Show, The Quick Draw McGraw Show, The Flintstones, The Yogi Bear Show, Top Cat, The Jetsons, The Hanna-Barbera New Cartoon Series, The Magilla Gorilla Show, The Peter Potamus Show, The Atom Ant Show, The Secret Squirrel Show, The Impossibles, Wacky Races, Scooby-Doo, Where Are You!, Hong Kong Phooey and The Smurfs.; Includes a behind-the-scenes look of the then-upcoming feature Jetsons: The Movie.
Hägar the Horrible: Hägar Knows Best	Ray Patterson	November 1, 1989	CBS	King Features Entertainment	Based on the comic strip by Dik Browne.
The Yum Yums: The Day Things Went Sour	Ray Patterson	April 7, 1990	CBS	Hallmark Cards	
The Flintstones: A Page Right Out of History		March 21, 1991	Direct-to-video		Documentary based on The Flintstones.
The Last Halloween	Savage Steve Holland	October 28, 1991	CBS	Pacific Data Images; Industrial Light & Magic	Live action/CGI animated.
I Yabba-Dabba Do!	William Hanna	February 7, 1993	ABC		Based on The Flintstones and The Pebbles and Bamm-Bamm Show.
Jonny's Golden Quest	Don Lusk; Paul Sommer	April 4, 1993	USA Network		Based on Jonny Quest.
The Halloween Tree	Mario Piluso	October 30, 1993	TBS		Based on the book of the same title by Ray Bradbury.
The Town Santa Forgot	Robert Alvarez	December 3, 1993	NBC		Based on the Poem “Jermey Creek” by Charmaine Severson.
Hollyrock-a-Bye Baby	William Hanna	December 5, 1993	ABC		Based on The Flintstones and The Pebbles and Bamm-Bamm Show.
A Flintstone Family Christmas	Ray Patterson	December 18, 1993	ABC		Based on The Flintstones.
Yogi the Easter Bear	Robert Alvarez	April 3, 1994	Syndication		Based on The Yogi Bear Show.
The Flintstones: The Best of Bedrock		May 8, 1994	Fox		Documentary based on The Flintstones (host: Rosie O'Donnell).; A salute to the original series that includes clips from the show and scenes from the live action film.
Scooby-Doo! in Arabian Nights	Jun Falkenstein; Joanna Romersa	September 3, 1994	TBS		Based on Scooby-Doo, Where Are You!, The Yogi Bear Show and The Magilla Gorilla Show.
A Flintstones Christmas Carol	Joanna Romersa	November 21, 1994	Syndication		Based on The Flintstones and Charles Dickens' novel A Christmas Carol.
SWAT Kats: A Special Report	Robert Alvarez	January 6, 1995	TBS		Based on SWAT Kats: The Radical Squadron.
Daisy-Head Mayzie	Tony Collingwood	February 5, 1995	TNT	Dr. Seuss Enterprises; Tony Collingwood Productions	Based on the story book of the same name.
Jonny Quest vs. The Cyber Insects	Mario Piluso	November 19, 1995	TNT		Based on Jonny Quest
Dexter's Laboratory: Ego Trip	Genndy Tartakovsky	December 10, 1999	Cartoon Network		Based on Dexter's Laboratory.; Final telefilm produced by Hanna-Barbera.

=== Live-action television films and specials ===
Title	Air date	Co-production(s)	Channel	Notes
Hardcase	February 1, 1972		ABC	TV movie starring Clint Walker and Stefanie Powers.; First fully live-action film produced by Hanna-Barbera.
Shootout in a One-Dog Town	January 9, 1974		ABC	TV movie starring Richard Crenna, Stefanie Powers and Jack Elam.
Smoganza	February 9, 1975	Environmental Protection Agency	NBC	
The Phantom Rebel	April 13, 1976		NBC	TV special starring Sandy McPeak aired as part of NBC Special Treat series.
The Gathering	December 4, 1977		ABC	TV movie starring Ed Asner and Maureen Stapleton.
The Beasts Are on the Streets	May 18, 1978		NBC	TV movie starring Carol Lynley, Billy Green Bush and Philip Michael Thomas.
KISS Meets the Phantom of the Park	October 28, 1978	Kiss/Aucoin Productions	NBC	TV movie starring Kiss, Anthony Zerbe and Deborah Ryan.
Legends of the Superheroes (Part 1)	January 18, 1979		NBC	TV special starring Adam West, Burt Ward and William Schallert.; Contains a laugh track.
Legends of the Superheroes (Part 2)	January 25, 1979		NBC	TV special starring Adam West, Burt Ward and William Schallert.; Contains a laugh track.
The Gathering, Part II	December 17, 1979		NBC	TV movie starring Maureen Stapleton and Efrem Zimbalist Jr.
Belle Starr	April 1, 1980	Entheos Unlimited Productions	CBS	TV movie starring Elizabeth Montgomery, Cliff Potts and Michael Cavanaugh.
The Great Gilly Hopkins	January 9, 1981		CBS	TV special starring Tricia Cast and Conchata Ferrell aired as part of CBS Afternoon Playhouse series.
Deadline	June 2, 1982	New South Wales Film Corporation	Nine Network	Australian TV movie starring Barry Newman, Bill Kerr and Trisha Noble.
Return to Eden (Part 1)	September 29, 1983	McElroy & McElroy	Network Ten	Australian TV miniseries starring Rebecca Gilling and James Reyne.
Return to Eden (Part 2)	October 6, 1983	McElroy & McElroy	Network Ten	Australian TV miniseries starring Rebecca Gilling and James Reyne.
Return to Eden (Part 3)	October 13, 1983	McElroy & McElroy	Network Ten	Australian TV miniseries starring Rebecca Gilling and James Reyne.
Shark's Paradise	March 13, 1986	McElroy & McElroy	Network 10	Australian TV movie starring David Reyne and Sally Tayler.
The Last Frontier (Part 1)	October 5, 1986	McElroy & McElroy; Taft Hardie Group	Network 10	Australian TV miniseries starring Linda Evans, Jack Thompson and Jason Robards.
The Last Frontier (Part 2)	October 7, 1986	McElroy & McElroy; Taft Hardie Group	Network 10	Australian TV miniseries starring Linda Evans, Jack Thompson and Jason Robards.
Stone Fox	March 30, 1987	Allarcom Limited; Taft Entertainment Television	NBC	TV movie starring Buddy Ebsen, Joey Cramer and Belinda Montgomery.
...Where's Rodney?	June 11, 1990	Aaron Spelling Productions	NBC	Pilot of an unrealized live-action comedy TV series starring Rodney Dangerfield.; Produced as Bedrock Productions.
Poochinski	July 9, 1990	20th Century Fox Television; Adam Productions	NBC	Pilot of an unrealized live-action comedy TV series starring Peter Boyle.; Produced as Bedrock Productions.
The Dreamer of Oz: The L. Frank Baum Story	December 10, 1990	Spelling Entertainment; Adam Productions	NBC	Produced as Bedrock Productions.

== Direct-to-video movies ==
=== The Greatest Adventure: Stories from the Bible ===
The Greatest Adventure: Stories from the Bible was an animated film series about three young adventurers—Derek, Margo and Moki—who travel back in time to watch biblical events take place. Thirteen video cassettes were released between 1985 and 1992.

Title	Year	Distribution
Moses	1986	Worldvision Home Video
Noah's Ark	1986	Worldvision Home Video
David and Goliath	1986	Worldvision Home Video
Daniel and the Lion's Den	1986	Worldvision Home Video
Joshua and the Battle of Jericho	1986	Worldvision Home Video
Samson and Delilah	1986	Worldvision Home Video
The Nativity	1987	Worldvision Home Video
The Creation	1988	Worldvision Home Video
The Easter Story	1989	Hanna-Barbera Home Video
Joseph and His Brothers	1990	Hanna-Barbera Home Video
The Miracles of Jesus	1991	Hanna-Barbera Home Video
Queen Esther	1992	Turner Home Entertainment
Jonah	1992	Turner Home Entertainment

=== Timeless Tales from Hallmark ===
Timeless Tales from Hallmark (co-produced with Hallmark Cards) was a live-action/animated film series hosted by Olivia Newton-John who introduced each tale followed by an environmental message. Eight video cassettes were released between 1990 and 1991.

Title	Year	Distribution
Rapunzel	1990	Hanna-Barbera Home Video
The Emperor's New Clothes	1990	Hanna-Barbera Home Video
Thumbelina	1990	Hanna-Barbera Home Video
The Ugly Duckling	1990	Hanna-Barbera Home Video
The Elves and the Shoemaker	1990	Hanna-Barbera Home Video
Rumpelstiltzkin	1990	Hanna-Barbera Home Video
Puss in Boots	1991	Hanna-Barbera Home Video
The Steadfast Tin Soldier	1991	Hanna-Barbera Home Video

=== Scooby-Doo ===
Hanna-Barbera was credited as the sole production company behind the first four films. Despite being in-name only after 2001, the 1960s–1970s production logo from Hanna-Barbera was still used for the next Scooby-Doo direct-to-video films after Scooby-Doo and the Cyber Chase until Scooby-Doo! and the Samurai Sword. The first, third and fourth films were dedicated to Don Messick, Mary Kay Bergman and William Hanna, respectively.

Title	Year	Distribution
Scooby-Doo on Zombie Island	1998	Warner Home Video
Scooby-Doo! and the Witch's Ghost	1999	Warner Home Video
Scooby-Doo and the Alien Invaders	2000	Warner Home Video
Scooby-Doo and the Cyber Chase	2001	Warner Home Video

== Theatrical shorts series ==
Title	Year	Distribution	Notes
Loopy De Loop	1959–1965	Columbia Pictures	48 theatrical shorts.

== Theatrical feature-length movies ==
Title	Directed by	Release date	Co-production with	Distribution	Notes
Hey There, It's Yogi Bear!	William Hanna; Joseph Barbera	June 3, 1964		Columbia Pictures	Animated
The Man Called Flintstone	William Hanna; Joseph Barbera	August 3, 1966		Columbia Pictures	Animated
Charlotte's Web	Charles A. Nichols; Iwao Takamoto	March 1, 1973	Sagittarius Productions	Paramount Pictures	Animated
Baxter!	Lionel Jeffries	March 4, 1973	Anglo-EMI / Group W	National General Pictures	Live-action
C.H.O.M.P.S.	Don Chaffey	December 21, 1979		American International Pictures	Live-action
Heidi's Song	Robert Taylor	November 19, 1982		Paramount Pictures	Animated
GoBots: Battle of the Rock Lords	Ray Patterson; Don Lusk; Alan Zaslove	March 21, 1986	Tonka	Clubhouse Pictures	Animated
Ultraman: The Adventure Begins	Mitsuo Kusakabe	October 12, 1987	Tsuburaya Productions	Toho	Animated
Jetsons: The Movie	William Hanna; Joseph Barbera	July 6, 1990		Universal Pictures	Animated
Once Upon a Forest	Charles Grosvenor	June 18, 1993	HTV Cymru/Wales	20th Century Fox	Animated
The Flintstones	Brian Levant	May 27, 1994	Amblin Entertainment	Universal Pictures	Live-action
The Flintstones in Viva Rock Vegas	Brian Levant	April 28, 2000	Amblin Entertainment	Universal Pictures	Live-action

Note: The Hanna-Barbera Feature division was spun into Turner Feature Animation after the company was bought out by Ted Turner.

Warner Bros. announced plans for a Hanna-Barbera cinematic universe at CinemaCon 2016, with Scoob! as its starting point.

== Other works ==
=== Commercials ===
Title	Year	Co-production with	Notes
Post Cereals	1957		Featuring Ruff and Reddy
Corn Flakes	1958–1966		Featuring characters from The Huckleberry Hound Show, Top Cat, The Yogi Bear Show and Cornelius the Rooster.
Sugar Stars	1959		Featuring The Huckleberry Hound Show.
Rice Krispies	1959		Featuring characters from The Quick Draw McGraw Show.
Sugar Smacks	1959–1960		Featuring characters from The Huckleberry Hound Show and The Quick Draw McGraw Show.
Winston Cigarettes	1960–1962		Featuring The Flintstones.
Raisin Bran	1960–1964; 1970s		Featuring Pixie and Dixie and Mr. Jinks.
Kellogg's Snack-Pak	1961		Featuring Quick Draw McGraw.
Kellogg's OK's	1961–1962		Featuring Yogi Bear.
Special K	1961		Featuring Yogi Bear.
Cocoa Krispies	1961–1962		Featuring Snagglepuss.
Welch's	1963–1966		Featuring The Flintstones.
PF Flyers	1964		Featuring Jonny Quest.
Rexall	1966		Featuring Alice in Wonderland or What's a Nice Kid like You Doing in a Place like This?.
Lion Oil	1960s		
Busch Advertising	1967	Gardner Advertising Company	Trade film for Busch beer, featuring The Flintstones.
Carnation Instant Breakfast	1967		
Dodge	1967–1968		
American Cancer Society	1968		Featuring The Flintstones and Yogi Bear.
More Than Ever Before	1968	American Heart Association	Featuring Yogi Bear.
Chex	1968		
Flintstones Vitamins	1968–1974		Featuring The Flintstones.
Philip Morris USA	1960s		
Frosted Flakes	1969		Featuring characters from Dastardly and Muttley in Their Flying Machines.
Keebler	1969		
Fanta	1969		
National Brewing Company	1969–1972		Numerous spots.
American Heart Foundation	1969		
Anti-Drug PSA	1969		
Aurora Plastics Corporation	1970		Featuring The Flintstones.
Froot Loops	1970s		
Pebbles Cereal	1971–2001		Featuring The Flintstones. Most commercials were animated by other studios.
Kings Island	1972		Featuring The Flintstones, The Banana Splits, Yogi Bear and Scooby-Doo.
Bali-Hai Wine	1972		
Girls Clubs of America	1973		Featuring the cast of Butch Cassidy and the Sundance Kids.
Arthur Treacher's Fish & Chips	1974		Featuring The Flintstones.
Flan Dane	1975		Featuring Tom and Jerry.
Dr. Pepper	1979		Featuring Popeye and Fred Flintstone.
Living a Healthy Lifestyle	1981		Featuring Yogi Bear and Boo-Boo Bear.
Smurf Berry Crunch	1983		Featuring The Smurfs.
Shriners Hospital	1984		Featuring The Flintstones.
Jetsons Cereal	1990		Featuring The Jetsons.
Cartoon Network	1997–2000		Network IDs featuring Hanna-Barbera properties.

=== Titles and sequences ===
Title	Year	Co-production with	Notes
Bewitched	1964	Screen Gems	Provided animated opening and closing credits.
Project X	1968	Paramount Pictures	Provided animation sequences.
Love, American Style	1972	Paramount Television	"Love and the Old-Fashioned Father" episode (pilot for Wait Till Your Father Gets Home) & "Love and the Private Eye" episode (unsold pilot for Melvin Danger, Private Eye).
Peter Puck	1973	NBC	Currently owned by Brian McFarlane.
That's Entertainment, Part II	1976	Metro-Goldwyn-Mayer	Provided animation sequence.
Whew!	1979	Jay Wolpert Productions	Provided animated opening sequence.
Popeye	1980	Paramount Pictures; Walt Disney Productions	Provided animated opening sequence.

Recruitment and industrial films

Title	Year	Co-production with	Notes
The Story of Dr. Lister	1964		Industrial film produced for Warner–Lambert.
Mr. Leaf	1964		Industrial film produced for the National Association of Tobacco.
Of Mutual Interest	1964		Industrial film produced for the Investment Company Institute.
Your Voice is Showing	1965		Industrial film produced for GTE.
More Than a Manager	1965		Industrial film produced for Bank of America.
Cost Reduction is a Money-Splendid Thing	1965		Industrial film produced for the Army Pictorial Service.
Better Odds for a Longer Life	1966		Industrial film produced for the American Heart Association.
Another Language	1966		Industrial film produced for the American Cancer Society.
Time for Decision	1966		Industrial film produced for AT&T.
Wings of Tomorrow	1966		Industrial film produced for Boeing.
The Incredible Voyage of Mark O'Gulliver	1967		Industrial film produced for the U.S. Chamber of Commerce.
Seven Steps	1969		Industrial film produced for Standard Oil.
Phil's Paradise	1970		Industrial film produced for State Farm.
Get On with Hamm's	1970		Sales training series produced for Hamm's Brewery.
The Picture Phone	1970		Industrial film produced for Western Electric.
Training Films	1970		Produced for Trans World Airlines.
Our Marketing System	1971		Industrial film produced for the U.S. Chamber of Commerce.
Drugs and the Law	1971		Industrial film produced for the National Institute of Mental Health.
Mobile Tie Down	1971		Industrial film produced for State Farm.
This is G.M.	1971		Industrial film produced for General Motors.
Dear Mr. President	1971		Industrial film produced for the United States Information Agency.
Time & Time Again	1972		Industrial film produced for the Timken Roller Bearing Company.
Fare Well	1972		Industrial film produced for State Farm.
Economic Understanding	1972		Industrial film produced for the U.S. Chamber of Commerce.
World of Motion	1973		Industrial film produced for General Motors.
Energy Dilemma	1973		Industrial film produced for Amoco Oil Company.
Popcorn	1974		Recruitment film produced for the Air Force Reserve.
Freedom 2000	1974		Industrial film produced for the U.S. Chamber of Commerce.
Two Breaths to...?	1979	United States Department of Energy	Industrial film produced for Westinghouse Hanford Company.

=== Educational films ===
Title	Year	Co-production with	Notes
A is for Astronaut	1969	Harper & Row	
Projections in Learning	1969	Harper & Row	
New Dimensions in English	1969	Harper & Row	
A Look at Chemical Change	1969	McGraw-Hill Book Company	
Observing & Describing	1969	McGraw-Hill Book Company	
Time Measure	1969	McGraw-Hill Book Company	
Classifying	1969	McGraw-Hill Book Company	
Weight Measure	1969	McGraw-Hill Book Company	
Experimenting	1969	McGraw-Hill Book Company	
Science Series	1970	Harper & Row	
The Drug Scene	1970	Los Angeles County Medical Association	
The Day I Died	1970	Los Angeles County Medical Association	
Choice	1970	Los Angeles County Medical Association	
Focus on Heroine	1970	Los Angeles County Medical Association	
Early Civilizations of the Non-Western World	1970	Audio Visual International	
Snowmobile Safety Savvy	1974	John Deere	
The Flintstones: Library Skills Series	1976	Xerox Films	Featuring characters from The Flintstones
Energy: A National Issue	1977		Featuring characters from The Flintstones and produced for Georgetown University Center for Strategic and International Studies
Hanna-Barbera Educational Filmstrips	1977–1980	Barr Films	Featuring characters from The Yogi Bear Show, The Flintstones, The Jetsons, Scooby-Doo, Where Are You!, The Banana Splits, Cattanooga Cats and Jabberjaw
Learning Tree Filmstrip Set	1981–1982		Featuring characters from The Huckleberry Hound Show, The Yogi Bear Show, The Flintstones, The Jetsons, Scooby-Doo, Where Are You! and The Banana Splits
Earthquake Preparedness	1984		Featuring Yogi Bear and produced for the City of Los Angeles Earthquake Preparedness Program
D.A.R.E. Bear Yogi	1989	D.A.R.E. America	Featuring Yogi Bear and characters from The Quick Draw McGraw Show, The Jetsons, Scooby-Doo, Where Are You! and The Flintstone Kids and produced for the Drug Abuse Resistance Education program
Meena, Count Your Chickens	1992	UNICEF; Fil-Cartoons	

=== Television shorts ===
Title	Creator(s)	Year	Co-production(s)	Notes
The Chicken from Outer Space	John R. Dilworth	1996	Stretch Films	Nominated for an Oscar. Pilot to Courage the Cowardly Dog
Kenny and the Chimp: Diseasy Does It! or Chimp 'n' Pox	Mr. Warburton	1998		The short would be incorporated as part of the show Codename: Kids Next Door, of which the art style of it and the character Professor XXXL would be used on.
King Crab: Space Crustacean	Bill Wray	1999		Aired as part of The Cartoon Cartoon Show.
The Grim Adventures of Billy & Mandy: Meet the Reaper	Maxwell Atoms	1999		Winner of Cartoon Network's Big Pick marathon in 2000 due to voting. Pilot to The Grim Adventures of Billy & Mandy. Also aired as part of the series premiere of Grim & Evil.
Foe Paws	Chris Savino	1999		Aired as part of Cartoon Network's Big Pick marathon in 2000, both losing to Billy & Mandy due to voting.
Thrillseekers: Putt 'n' Perish	Debbi Cone	1999		Aired as part of Cartoon Network's Big Pick marathon in 2000, both losing to Billy & Mandy due to voting.
Whatever Happened to Robot Jones?	Greg Miller	2000		Aired as a part of Cartoon Network's Big Pick marathon in 2000, losing to Billy & Mandy due to voting. It later became the pilot to Whatever Happened to... Robot Jones?.
Uncle Gus: For the Love of Monkeys	Lincoln Peirce	2000		Aired as part of Cartoon Network's Big Pick marathon in 2000, losing to Billy & Mandy due to voting.
The Mansion Cat	Karl Toerge	2001	Turner Entertainment Co.	Featuring Tom and Jerry

=== Theme park rides ===
Title	Year	Co-production(s)	Notes
The Funtastic World of Hanna-Barbera	1990	Universal Studios; Sullivan Bluth Studios; Kurtz & Friends; Rhythm and Hues Studios	Theme park ride at Universal Studios Florida (closed in 2002)

A section of Wonderland Sydney was titled Hanna-Barbera Land and featured rides and facilities based on cartoon characters.

== Hanna-Barbera Classic Collection ==
The "Hanna-Barbera Classic Collection" (once called the "Hanna-Barbera Golden Collection", later called the "Hanna-Barbera Diamond Collection") is a series of two-to-four-disc DVD box sets from Warner Home Video and later by Warner Archive Collection, usually containing complete seasons and complete series of various classic Hanna-Barbera (with MGM Cartoons and Ruby-Spears) cartoons (along with the television movies and specials). The line began in March 2004.

=== Warner Home Video releases ===
==== 2004 ====
- The Flintstones: The Complete First Season (March 16, 2004)
- Scooby-Doo, Where Are You!: The Complete First and Second Seasons (March 16, 2004)
- The Jetsons: The Complete First Season (May 11, 2004)
- Jonny Quest: The Complete First Season (May 11, 2004)
- Wacky Races: The Complete Series (October 19, 2004)
- The Flintstones: The Complete Second Season (December 7, 2004)
- Top Cat: The Complete Series (December 7, 2004)

==== 2005 ====
- The Flintstones: The Complete Third Season (March 22, 2005)
- The Best of the New Scooby-Doo Movies (March 22, 2005)
- Dastardly and Muttley in Their Flying Machines: The Complete Series (May 10, 2005)
- The Perils of Penelope Pitstop: The Complete Series (May 10, 2005)
- The Flintstones: The Complete Fourth Season (November 15, 2005)
- The Huckleberry Hound Show: Volume 1 (November 15, 2005)
- The Yogi Bear Show: The Complete Series (November 15, 2005)

==== 2006 ====
- The Flintstones: The Complete Fifth Season (March 7, 2006)
- The Scooby-Doo/Dynomutt Hour: The Complete Series (March 7, 2006)
- Magilla Gorilla: The Complete Series (August 15, 2006)
- Hong Kong Phooey: The Complete Series (August 15, 2006)
- The Flintstones: The Complete Sixth Season (September 5, 2006)

==== 2007 ====
- Scooby-Doo, Where Are You!: The Complete Third Season (April 10, 2007)
- Wait Till Your Father Gets Home: The Complete First Season (June 5, 2007)
- Space Ghost and Dino Boy: The Complete Series (July 17, 2007)
- Birdman and the Galaxy Trio: The Complete Series (July 17, 2007)
- Josie and the Pussycats: The Complete Series (September 18, 2007)

==== 2008 ====
- The Smurfs: Season One, Volume 1 (February 26, 2008)
- The Pebbles and Bamm-Bamm Show: The Complete Series (March 18, 2008)
- The Richie Rich/Scooby-Doo Show: Volume 1 (May 20, 2008)
- The Smurfs: Season One, Volume 2 (October 7, 2008)

==== 2009 ====
- The Real Adventures of Jonny Quest: Season 1, Volume 1 (February 17, 2009)
- The Jetsons: Season 2, Volume 1 (June 2, 2009)

=== Warner Archive releases ===
==== 2009 ====
- Yogi's First Christmas (November 17, 2009) (TV movie)

==== 2010 ====
- The Pirates of Dark Water: The Complete Series (August 31, 2010)
- Josie and the Pussycats in Outer Space: The Complete Series (October 19, 2010)
- The Addams Family: The Complete Series (October 19, 2010)
- The Funky Phantom: The Complete Series (October 26, 2010)
- Goober and the Ghost Chasers: The Complete Series (October 26, 2010)
- The Dukes: The Complete Series (December 7, 2010)
- Yogi and the Invasion of the Space Bears (December 7, 2010) (TV movie)
- Yogi Bear and the Magical Flight of the Spruce Goose (December 7, 2010) (TV movie)
- Yogi's Great Escape (December 7, 2010) (TV movie)
- SWAT Kats: The Radical Squadron: The Complete Series (December 14, 2010)
- Thundarr the Barbarian: The Complete Series (December 17, 2010) (Ruby-Spears)

==== 2011 ====
- Speed Buggy: The Complete Series (January 11, 2011)
- Wheelie and the Chopper Bunch: The Complete Series (January 25, 2011)
- Jabberjaw: The Complete Series (February 15, 2011)
- The Space Kidettes / Young Samson (March 8, 2011)
- Valley of the Dinosaurs: The Complete Series (March 22, 2011)
- Chuck Norris: Karate Kommandos: The Complete Series (April 1, 2011) (Ruby-Spears)
- Frankenstein Jr. and The Impossibles: The Complete Series (April 26, 2011)
- Mister T: The Complete First Season (May 10, 2011) (Ruby-Spears)
- Challenge of the GoBots: The Original Miniseries (May 17, 2011)
- The Herculoids: The Complete Series (June 14, 2011)
- The Jetsons Meet the Flintstones (June 14, 2011) (TV movie)
- Moby Dick and Mighty Mightor: The Complete Series (July 19, 2011)
- Rockin' with Judy Jetson (August 9, 2011) (TV movie)
- The Good, the Bad, and Huckleberry Hound (August 9, 2011) (TV movie)
- Top Cat and the Beverly Hills Cats (August 9, 2011) (TV movie)
- Jonny Quest vs. The Cyber Insects (August 9, 2011) (TV movie)
- Jonny's Golden Quest (August 9, 2011) (TV movie)
- Dragon's Lair: The Complete Series (September 20, 2011) (Ruby-Spears)
- A Flintstone Christmas Collection (September 27, 2011)
  - A Flintstone Christmas (TV special)
  - A Flintstone Family Christmas (TV special)
- The Jetsons: Season 2, Volume 2 (November 8, 2011)

==== 2012 ====
- Pac-Man: The Complete First Season (January 31, 2012)
- The Real Adventures of Jonny Quest: Season 1, Volume 2 (March 27, 2012)
- Shazzan: The Complete Series (April 3, 2012)
- Inch High, Private Eye: The Complete Series (April 24, 2012)
- Sealab 2020: The Complete Series (May 22, 2012)
- The Amazing Chan and the Chan Clan: The Complete Series (June 19, 2012)
- Hanna-Barbera Christmas Classics Collection (July 31, 2012)
  - The Town Santa Forgot (TV special)
  - A Christmas Story (TV special)
  - Casper's First Christmas (TV special)
- Sky Commanders: The Complete Animated Series (August 28, 2012)
- The Halloween Tree (August 28, 2012) (TV movie)
- Pac-Man: The Complete Second Season (September 11, 2012)
- Snorks: The Complete First Season (September 25, 2012)
- The Flintstones Prime-Time Specials Collection: Volume 1 (October 9, 2012)
  - The Flintstones Meet Rockula and Frankenstone (TV special)
  - The Flintstones: Little Big League (TV special)
- The Flintstones Prime-Time Specials Collection: Volume 2 (October 9, 2012)
  - The Flintstones' New Neighbors (TV special)
  - Fred's Final Fling (TV special)
  - Wind-Up Wilma (TV special)
  - Jogging Fever (TV special)
- I Yabba-Dabba Do! (October 9, 2012) (TV movie)
- Hollyrock-a-Bye Baby (October 9, 2012) (TV movie)

==== 2013 ====
- Butch Cassidy and the Sundance Kids: The Complete Series (January 15, 2013)
- The Completely Mental Misadventures of Ed Grimley: The Complete Series (January 29, 2013)
- Yogi's Gang: The Complete Series (February 19, 2013)
- Help!... It's the Hair Bear Bunch!: The Complete Series (March 12, 2013)
- The Roman Holidays: The Complete Series (April 23, 2013)
- Captain Caveman and the Teen Angels: The Complete Series (July 23, 2013)
- Casper's Halloween Special (October 1, 2013) (TV special)
  - The Thanksgiving That Almost Wasn't (TV special)
- Space Stars: The Complete Series (October 8, 2013)
- The Cabbage Patch Kids First Christmas / The Little Troll Prince (October 18, 2013) (TV specials)

==== 2014 ====
- Jonny Quest: The Complete Eighties Adventures (April 8, 2014)
- Challenge of the GoBots: The Series, Volume 1 (May 6, 2014)
- The Jetsons: Season 3 (May 13, 2014)
- Loopy De Loop: The Complete Collection (September 9, 2014)
- Shirt Tales: The Complete Series (September 16, 2014)
- The Super Globetrotters: The Complete Series (October 28, 2014)

==== 2015 ====
- Challenge of the GoBots: The Series, Volume 2 (March 10, 2015)
- Snorks: The Complete Second Season (July 7, 2015)
- Centurions: Part 1 (July 21, 2015) (Ruby-Spears)
- Clue Club: The Complete Animated Series (August 11, 2015)
- Hanna-Barbera Specials Collection (September 15, 2015)
  - The Last of the Curlews (TV special)
  - Oliver and the Artful Dodger (TV special)
  - The Adventures of Robin Hoodnik (TV special)
  - The Three Musketeers (TV special)
  - Cyrano (TV special)
- Jack and the Beanstalk (September 15, 2015) (TV special)
- Atom Ant: The Complete Series (October 6, 2015)
- The Secret Squirrel Show: The Complete Series (November 3, 2015)
- The Real Adventures of Jonny Quest: The Complete Second Season (November 10, 2015)
- Galtar and the Golden Lance: The Complete Series (November 10, 2015)

==== 2016 ====
- Centurions: Part 2 (March 15, 2016) (Ruby-Spears)
- Devlin: The Complete Series (May 24, 2016)
- The New Adventures of Huckleberry Finn: The Complete Series (June 28, 2016)
- Where's Huddles?: The Complete Series (July 26, 2016)
- The Kwicky Koala Show: The Complete Series (October 11, 2016)
- The Peter Potamus Show: The Complete Series (November 1, 2016)
- Snorks: The Complete Third and Fourth Seasons (December 6, 2016)

==== 2017 ====
- Top Cat: The Complete Series (January 10, 2017) (re-release)
- Wacky Races: The Complete Series (February 14, 2017) (re-release)
- Monchhichis: The Complete Series (April 18, 2017)
- Dink, the Little Dinosaur: The Complete Series (October 10, 2017) (Ruby-Spears)
- Space Ghost and Dino Boy: The Complete Series (December 5, 2017) (re-release)
- Birdman and the Galaxy Trio: The Complete Series (December 5, 2017) (re-release)

==== 2018 ====
- The Biskitts: The Complete Series (February 20, 2018)
- 2 Stupid Dogs/Super Secret Secret Squirrel: Volume 1 (August 14, 2018)

==== 2019 ====
- Paw Paws: The Complete Series (April 9, 2019)
- Wally Gator: The Complete Series (June 25, 2019)
- Lippy the Lion and Hardy Har Har: The Complete Series (July 9, 2019)

==== 2020 ====
- Paddington Bear: The Complete Series (July 31, 2020)

=== Hanna-Barbera Diamond Collection ===
- The Flintstones: The Complete First Season (May 23, 2017) (re-release)
- The Jetsons: The Complete First Season (May 23, 2017) (re-release)
- Scooby-Doo, Where Are You!: The Complete First and Second Seasons (May 23, 2017) (re-release)
- Dastardly and Muttley in Their Flying Machines: The Complete Series (June 6, 2017) (re-release)
- Hong Kong Phooey: The Complete Series (June 6, 2017) (re-release)
- The Huckleberry Hound Show: Season 1, Volume 1 (June 6, 2017) (re-release)
- Jonny Quest: The Complete First Season (June 6, 2017) (re-release)
- Magilla Gorilla: The Complete Series (June 6, 2017) (re-release)
- The Perils of Penelope Pitstop: The Complete Series (June 6, 2017) (re-release)
- Scooby-Doo, Where Are You!: The Complete Third Season (June 6, 2017) (re-release)
- The Best of The New Scooby-Doo Movies (June 6, 2017) (re-release)
- Top Cat: The Complete Series (June 6, 2017) (re-release)
- Wacky Races: The Complete Series (June 6, 2017) (re-release)
- The Yogi Bear Show: The Complete Series (June 6, 2017) (re-release)
- Josie and the Pussycats: The Complete Series (June 20, 2017) (re-release)
- The Pebbles and Bamm-Bamm Show: The Complete Series (June 20, 2017) (re-release)
- The Smurfs: The First Season (June 20, 2017) (re-release)
- Tom and Jerry Spotlight Collection: Volume 2 (October 3, 2017) (re-release) (MGM Cartoons)
- Tom and Jerry Spotlight Collection: Volume 3 (October 3, 2017) (re-release) (MGM Cartoons)
- The Flintstones: The Complete Second Season (October 3, 2017) (re-release)
- The Flintstones: The Complete Third Season (October 3, 2017) (re-release)
- The Flintstones: The Complete Fourth Season (October 3, 2017) (re-release)
- The Flintstones: The Complete Fifth Season (October 3, 2017) (re-release)
- The Flintstones: The Complete Sixth Season (October 3, 2017) (re-release)
- The Scooby-Doo/Dynomutt Hour: The Complete Series (October 3, 2017) (re-release)
- The Richie Rich/Scooby-Doo Show: Volume 1 (October 3, 2017) (re-release)
- Hanna-Barbera Diamond Collection 4-Pack (December 5, 2017)
- The Flintstones: The Complete Series (February 13, 2018) (re-release)
- The Jetsons: The Complete Series (October 13, 2020)

=== Blu-ray releases ===
==== 2019 ====
- The New Scooby-Doo Movies: The (Almost) Complete Collection (June 4, 2019)
- Jonny Quest: The Complete Original Series (June 11, 2019)
- Scooby-Doo, Where Are You!: The Complete Series (September 3, 2019)
- The Jetsons: The Complete Original Series (September 10, 2019)

==== 2020 ====
- The Flintstones: The Complete Series (October 13, 2020)
- Space Ghost & Dino Boy: The Complete Series (October 13, 2020)
- Josie and the Pussycats: The Complete Series (November 3, 2020)

==== 2021 ====
- Josie and the Pussycats in Outer Space: The Complete Series (April 13, 2021)
- The Herculoids: The Complete Original Series (July 27, 2021)

==== 2022 ====
- Scooby-Doo, Where Are You!: The Complete Series (March 1, 2022) (re-release)

==== 2023 ====
- Hey There, It's Yogi Bear! (May 30, 2023) (film)

==== 2024 ====
- Hanna-Barbera Superstars 10 (February 20, 2024) (film series)
  - Yogi's Great Escape
  - Scooby-Doo Meets the Boo Brothers
  - The Jetsons Meet the Flintstones
  - Yogi Bear and the Magical Flight of the Spruce Goose
  - Top Cat and the Beverly Hills Cats
  - The Good, the Bad, and Huckleberry Hound
  - Rockin' with Judy Jetson
  - Scooby-Doo and the Ghoul School
  - Scooby-Doo and the Reluctant Werewolf
  - Yogi and the Invasion of the Space Bears
- Top Cat: The Complete Series (September 17, 2024)
- Jonny's Golden Quest / Jonny Quest vs. the Cyber-Insects (September 24, 2024)

==== 2025 ====
- Wait Till Your Father Gets Home: The Complete Series (January 28, 2025)
- Frankenstein Jr. and The Impossibles: The Complete Series (January 28, 2025)
- The Magilla Gorilla Show: The Complete Series (March 25, 2025)
- Wacky Races: The Complete Series (April 29, 2025)
- The Huckleberry Hound Show: The Complete Series (August 26, 2025)
- Touché Turtle and Dum Dum: The Complete Series (September 30, 2025)
- Lippy the Lion and Hardy Har Har: The Complete Series (December 16, 2025)
- Wally Gator: The Complete Series (December 16, 2025)

==== 2026 ====
- The New Fred and Barney Show: The Complete Series (January 27, 2026)
- Loopy De Loop: The Complete Collection (February 24, 2026)
- Scooby's All-Star Laff-A-Lympics: The Complete Series (March 31, 2026)
- Dastardly and Muttley in Their Flying Machines: The Complete Series (June 30, 2026)
- The Quick Draw McGraw Show: The Complete Series (October 20, 2026)
- The Yogi Bear Show: The Complete Series (November 24, 2026)
- The Abbott and Costello Cartoons: The Complete Collection (December 29, 2026)

== See also ==
- Hanna-Barbera (1957–2001)
- Hanna-Barbera Studios Europe (2021–present)
- List of Hanna-Barbera characters
- List of films based on Hanna-Barbera cartoons
- Ruby-Spears (1977–1996)
- List of Ruby-Spears productions
- Cartoon Network Studios
- Warner Bros. Animation
- Williams Street
- Animation in the United States in the television era
- Hanna-Barbera in amusement parks
- Metro-Goldwyn-Mayer cartoon studio
  - Tom and Jerry
  - Droopy
  - Spike and Tyke
