= The Flintstones: Little Big League =

1978 Flintstones TV special

- Directed by: Chris Cuddington
- Voices of: Henry Corden; Mel Blanc; Jean Vander Pyl; Gay Autterson Hartwig; Pamela Anderson; Frank Welker; John Stephenson
- Music by: Hoyt Curtin
- Country of origin: United States; Australia
- Original language: English

Production
- Executive producers: William Hanna; Joseph Barbera
- Producer: Neil Balnaves
- Editor: Tom Whintall
- Running time: 60 minutes
- Production companies: Hanna-Barbera Productions; Hanna-Barbera Pty, Ltd.

Original release
- Network: NBC
- Release: April 6, 1978

Related
- Hanna-Barbera's All-Star Comedy Ice Revue; The Flintstones Meet Rockula and Frankenstone

The Flintstones: Little Big League is a 1978 animated television special featuring characters from The Flintstones franchise. It was produced by the Australian division of Hanna-Barbera and aired on NBC on April 6, 1978. It was an hour-long primetime special, as part of The Flintstone Primetime Specials.

It was the first fully-animated television film made in Australia.

== Summary ==
Fred and Barney become coaches of opposing Little League baseball teams: Barney is coach of the Sandstone Sluggers, a team that features the incredible hitting prowess of his son, Bamm-Bamm, and Fred volunteers to coach an opposing team, the Bedrock Brontos, for his boss Mr. Slate. When driving home from work, he ends up pulled over by a police officer for speeding. When Fred mentions that he is coaching the Bedrock Brontos, the police officer lets him off with a warning and says that he has a pitcher for his team.

Upon arriving home, Fred tells Wilma and Pebbles that he became the coach for the Bedrock Brontos. He decides not let Barney know of this until later.

When it comes to practice, Fred denies having Barney see them. When Fred does meet the team, he ends up meeting Lefty (the son of the police officer that pulled Fred over earlier) and Dusty (the son of Judge Shale). At the quarry the next day, Mr. Slate tells Fred to make the Bedrock Brontos a champion team or Fred will lose his job. When driving home later, he ends up accidentally rear-ending the police officer who ends up confiscating Fred's license. When Fred states that he will improve on Lefty's abilities, the police officer returns Fred's license with a warning not to enact a third warning next time.

Moments later at home, Fred and his family are visited by Judge Shale who was not pleased that Dusty was resting while benched. Judge Shale then tells Fred that Dusty better be on the field practicing or he will land Fred in the courthouse.

During practice the next day, Fred discovers that the Brontos' only strength is spearheaded by Pebbles who stuns everyone with her remarkable pitching skills and fielding ability. Fred decides to put Pebbles on his team.

Leaving their long-standing friendship in the dug-out, Fred and Barney lead their teams right into the championship. When Barney stays with Fred, they sleep together that night. The next morning, a tired Fred and Barney take off and try to get to the ballpark as fast they could only to be pulled over by a short police officer who ends up taking them to Judge Shale.

At the stadium, Wilma and Betty wonder what's taking Fred and Barney.

Meanwhile, at the courthouse, Judge Shale suspends the sentence on Fred and Barney for speeding when it turns out that the game between the Bedrock Brontos and the Sandstone Sluggers is occurring. Judge Shale then has the short police officer escort them to the ballpark.

At the stadium, Mr. Slate has Wilma and Betty cover for Fred and Barney on the field. The game begins as Fred, Barney, and Judge Shale arrive. As the game continues, Pebbles pitches the ball to Bamm-Bamm who ends up hitting it upward. Since the ball hasn't come down and it isn't a home run or a foul, the game ends in a tie, which leads all of the players and Fred and Barney to sing "Be a Good Sport". Barney believes that the song has a lot of philosophy, and Fred agrees. Then, the players carry Fred and Barney on their shoulders in celebration.

== Voice cast ==
- Henry Corden as Fred Flintstone
- Mel Blanc as Barney Rubble, Dino
- Jean Vander Pyl as Wilma Flintstone
- Gay Autterson Hartwig as Betty Rubble
- Pamela Anderson as Pebbles Flintstone
- Frank Welker as Bamm-Bamm Rubble
- John Stephenson as Mr. Slate
- Ted Cassidy as Police Officer
- Lucille Bliss as Dusty
- Randy Gray as Lefty
- Don Messick as Quarry Worker
- Herb Vigran as Judge Charlie Shale

== Reception ==
Wilmington, Delaware's The News Journal commented that shows like The Flintstones were "fun to watch on an occasional basis, but not week-in-week-out", making this program welcome, despite "the canned laugh track... As in the past, the story line for this Flintsone outing is simple and the humor broad."

Like many animated series created by Hanna-Barbera in the 1970s, the show features a limited laugh track created by the studio as a cost saving measure, which has been criticized as having an uncanny effect owing to its frequent repetition of sounds.

== Home media ==
The Flintstones: Little Big League was released on VHS by Worldvision Home Video on August 5, 1986.

On October 9, 2012, Warner Archive released The Flintstones: Little Big League on DVD in region 1 as part of their Hanna–Barbera Classics Collection, in a release entitled The Flintstones Prime-Time Specials Collection: Volume 1. This is a Manufacture-on-Demand (MOD) release, available exclusively through Warner's online store and Amazon.com.

On August 4, 2020, Warner Bros. Home Entertainment gave it its first wide release as part of the DVD collection The Flintstones: 2 Movies & 5 Specials.
