= The Space Kidettes =

American animated television series

- Genre: Science fiction
- Created by: William Hanna; Joseph Barbera
- Directed by: Joseph Barbera; William Hanna
- Voices of: Chris Allen; Lucille Bliss; Daws Butler; Don Messick; Janet Waldo
- Country of origin: United States
- Original language: English
- No. of episodes: 20

Production
- Producers: Joseph Barbera; William Hanna
- Running time: 30 minutes
- Production company: Hanna-Barbera Productions

Original release
- Network: NBC
- Release: September 10, 1966 – February 4, 1967

The Space Kidettes is an American Saturday morning animated television series produced by Hanna-Barbera Productions, originally airing on NBC during the 1966–67 season. In the show, junior rangers Snoopy, Jenny, Countdown and Scooter patrol the cosmos from their space-capsule clubhouse, with help from their dog Pupstar. Twenty episodes were produced.

== Plot ==
Set in outer space, the series followed the adventures of a group of child astronauts, who have acquired a treasure map and have to keep it away from their space pirate nemesis Captain Skyhook and his sidekick Static.

== Episodes ==
1. Molemen Menace (1966-09-10)
2. Jet Set Go (1966-09-17)
3. Space Indians (1966-09-24)
4. Swamp-Swamped (1966-10-01)
5. Space Heroes (1966-10-08)
6. Space Witch (1966-10-15)
7. Tale of a Whale (1966-10-22)
8. Space Giant (1966-10-29)
9. Space Carnival (1966-11-05)
10. The Laser-Breathing Space Dragon (1966-11-12)
11. The Flight Before Christmas (1966-11-19)
12. Beach Brawl (1966-11-26)
13. Dog-napped in Space (1966-12-03)
14. Secret Solar Robot (1966-12-10)
15. King of the Space Pirates (1966-12-17)
16. Planet of Greeps (1966-12-24)
17. Cosmic Condors (1966-12-31)
18. The Space Mermaid (1967-01-07)
19. Haunted Planet (1967-01-14)
20. Something Old, Something Gnu (1967-01-21)

== Voice cast ==
- Chris Allen – Scooter (freckled kid, blue suit)
- Lucille Bliss – Snoopy (kid with white hair, orange suit)
- Daws Butler – Captain Skyhook
- Don Messick – Countdown (leader / kid with glasses, green suit), Pupstar (dog), Static
- Janet Waldo – Jenny Jet (girl with cap and dress)

== Production ==
Originally airing for one season on NBC as a half-hour program and sponsored by General Mills, The Space Kidettes episodes were later edited down to ten-minute episodes and paired with other General Mills-sponsored shows such as Tennessee Tuxedo and Go Go Gophers to form a full half-hour for syndication.

Edited further, it was later paired with edited reruns of cartoons from another NBC Hanna-Barbera program, (Young) Samson & Goliath to form the syndication package The Space Kidettes and Young Samson. The original master elements for both programs were lost, leaving the syndicated edits as the only extant broadcast quality versions.

== Home Media ==
All 20 episodes of The Space Kidettes and Young Samson were released on DVD via the Warner Archive Collection manufacture-on-demand program in 2011.

== See also ==
- List of works produced by Hanna-Barbera Productions
- List of Hanna-Barbera characters
