= The Adventures of Robin Hoodnik =

1972 television film directed by Joseph Barbera and William Hanna

- Genre: Comedy; Adventure
- Written by: Jack Mendelsohn
- Directed by: Joseph Barbera; William Hanna
- Starring: Cynthia Adler; Daws Butler; Joe E. Ross; Hal Smith; John Stephenson; Len Weinrib
- Theme music composer: Hoyt Curtin; Paul Dekorte
- Country of origin: United States
- Original language: English

Production
- Producers: Joseph Barbera; William Hanna; Lewis Marshall
- Running time: 45 minutes
- Production company: Hanna-Barbera Productions

Original release
- Network: ABC
- Release: November 4, 1972

The Adventures of Robin Hoodnik is an American animated television movie produced by Hanna-Barbera Productions. It was broadcast on the ABC television network on November 4, 1972, and was part of The ABC Saturday Superstar Movie series. The special featured an all-animal cast in a retelling of Robin Hood. The special was broadcast just a year before Walt Disney Productions released their theatrical animated version of the story. Nineteen years later, in 1991, Hanna-Barbera produced another television adaptation of the Robin Hood legend, Young Robin Hood, their international co-production with CINAR, Crayon Animation and France Animation.

== Voice cast ==
- Cynthia Adler as Maid Marian
- Daws Butler as Scounger and Richard
- Joe E. Ross as Oxx
- Hal Smith as Donkey
- John Stephenson as Sheriff of Nottingham and Carbuncle
- Len Weinrib as Robin Hoodnik, Alan Airedale, Whirlin' Merlin, Lord Scurvy, Friar Pork, and Little John

== See also ==
- List of works produced by Hanna-Barbera
- Robin Hood (disambiguation)
