= The Hanna-Barbera New Cartoon Series =

American syndicated television package of animated series

- Also known as: The New Hanna-Barbera Cartoon Series; The Wally Gator Show; Cartoon Zoo (WPIX-TV)
- Genre: Cartoon series
- Directed by: William Hanna; Joseph Barbera
- Voices of: Daws Butler; Bill Thompson; Mel Blanc; Alan Reed; Don Messick
- Country of origin: United States
- No. of episodes: 52 (list of episodes)

Production
- Producers: William Hanna; Joseph Barbera
- Running time: 30 minutes
- Production company: Hanna-Barbera Productions

Original release
- Network: First-run syndication
- Release: September 3, 1962 – August 26, 1963

The Hanna-Barbera New Cartoon Series (also known as The New Hanna-Barbera Cartoon Series or The Wally Gator Show) was an American syndicated television package of three animated series produced by Hanna-Barbera Productions. The package started on September 3, 1962, and ended on August 26, 1963, and included the following unrelated short cartoon segments featuring talking animals characters:

- Wally Gator
- Touché Turtle and Dum Dum
- Lippy the Lion and Hardy Har Har

The package consisted of 52 episodes, each with three individual segments and no bridge animation. Each individual cartoon segment had its own opening theme and closing title.

The title The New Hanna-Barbera Cartoon Series was an off-screen promotional title to distinguish this package from other Hanna-Barbera cartoons available at the time (such as The Huckleberry Hound Show, The Quick Draw McGraw Show and The Yogi Bear Show, all of which had bridge animation between the cartoons). For example, WGN-Channel 9 in Chicago ran the three segments in a half-hour timeslot under the name Wally Gator. In New York, WPIX-TV originally used the segments for a local series, Cartoon Zoo, featuring Milt Moss as host and "Zookeeper", with life-sized cutouts of the characters in "cages" as a backdrop.

The package was originally syndicated by Screen Gems, the television division at the time of Columbia Pictures. The Hanna-Barbera studio was later purchased by the Taft Broadcasting Company, which distributed the studio's product first through Taft-HB Program Sales, and later through Worldvision Enterprises. Over time, the studio regained control of many of its earlier productions and distributed them through Worldvision. The elements of The New Hanna-Barbera Cartoon Series were split up, with Wally Gator airing as a segment on Magilla Gorilla and Friends on USA Network's Cartoon Express from 1987 through 1991. Meanwhile, Touche Turtle and Lippy the Lion were part of another package of cartoons aired on The Family Channel. Following the purchase of the Hanna-Barbera library by Turner Entertainment (which in turn, was later acquired and absorbed into Warner Bros. Television Distribution), these shorts eventually appeared on Cartoon Network and later Boomerang.

As of February 17, 2025, all three segments are currently airing as part of "House of Hanna-Barbera", a programming block on MeTV Toons. Like the other H-B shorts aired in that block, these three segments are presented in brand new HD transfers by Warner Bros., despite the fact most of the segments could only be sourced from poor and low-quality elements.

== List of episodes ==
Nº	Wally Gator	Touché Turtle	Lippy & Hardy	Air date
1	"Droopy Dragon"; Animation: Dick Lundy	"Whale of a Tale"; Animation: Ed Parks	"See-Saw"; Animation: Kenneth Muse	September 3, 1962
2	"Gator-Napper"; Animation: Hugh Fraser	"Zero-Hero"; Animation: Kenneth Muse	"Water-Melon Felon"; Animation: William Keil	September 10, 1962
3	"Swamp Fever"; Animation: George Goepper	"Dilly of a Lily"; Animation: George Nicholas	"Scare to Spare"; Animation: William Keil	September 17, 1962
4	"White Tie and Frails"; Animation: Jack Ozark	"Missing Missile"; Animation: George Nicholas	"Gulp and Saucer"; Animation: Bob Carr	September 24, 1962
5	"Escape Artist"; Animation: Jack Carr	"Lake Serpent"; Animation: Kenneth Muse	"Map Happy"; Animation: William Keil	October 1, 1962
6	"California or Bust"; Animation: George Goepper	"You Bug Me"; Animation: Ed Parks	"Smile the Wild"; Animation: William Keil	October 8, 1962
7	"Frame and Fortune"; Animation: Harry Holt	"Roll-A-Ghoster"; Animation: Ed Aardal	"Charge of the Fright Brigade"; Animation: Robert Bentley	October 15, 1962
8	"Tantalizin' Turnips"; Animation: Ed Parks	"Giant Double-Header"; Animation: George Nicholas	"Film Flam"; Animation: Bob Carr	October 22, 1962
9	"Over the Fence Is Out"; Animation: Hugh Fraser	"Loser Take All"; Animation: Bob Carr	"Gunflighter"; Animation: Ed Parks	October 29, 1962
10	"Bear with Me"; Animation: Unknown	"Takes Two to Tangle"; Animation: Bob Carr	"Hick Hikers"; Animation: Bob Carr	November 5, 1962
11	"Outside Looking In"; Animation: Dick Lundy	"Mr. Robots"; Animation: George Nicholas	"A Thousand and One Frights"; Animation: Robert Bentley	November 12, 1962
12	"Bachelor Buttons"; Animation: Unknown	"Touché at Bat"; Animation: Kenneth Muse	"Double Trouble"; Animation: Ed Parks	November 19, 1962
13	"Which Is Which Witch"; Animation: Don Patterson	"Billy the Cad"; Animation: Jerry Hathcock	"Laugh a Loaf"; Animation: Don Williams	November 26, 1962
14	"Pen-Striped Suit"; Animation: Allen Wilzbach	"Dog Daze"; Animation: Bob Carr	"Genie Is a Meany"; Animation: Unknown	December 3, 1962
15	"Ship-Shape Escape"; Animation: Robert Bentley	"Ant and Rave"; Animation: Ed Love	"Banks for Everything"; Animation: Bob Carr	December 10, 1962
16	"Semi Seminole"; Animation: George Goepper	"Black Is the Knight"; Animation: Ed Love	"Fiddle-Faddled"; Animation: Ed Love	December 17, 1962
17	"Little Red Riding Gator"; Animation: Don Patterson	"Dragon Along"; Animation: Ed Love	"Kidnap-Trap"; Animation: Ed Love	December 24, 1962
18	"Ice Cube Boob"; Animation: Carlo Vinci	"Satellite Fright"; Animation: Ed Love	"Witch Crafty"; Animation: Unknown	December 31, 1962
19	"The Forest's Prime Evil"; Animation: Unknown	"Sheepy-Time Pal"; Animation: Hugh Fraser	"Gas Again"; Animation: Don Patterson	January 7, 1963
20	"Snooper Snowzer"; Animation: Harry Holt	"Hex Marks the Spot"; Animation: Ed Parks	"Horse and Waggin"; Animation: Ed Love	January 14, 1963
21	"Unconscious Conscience"; Animation: Unknown	"Catch as Cat Can"; Animation: Dick Lundy	"Baby Bottled"; Animation: Bob Carr	January 21, 1963
22	"Gator-Baiter"; Animation: Unknown	"Sea for Two"; Animation: Ed Love	"Hard Luck Hardy"; Animation: Ed Love	January 28, 1963
23	"False Alarm"; Animation: Unknown	"High Goon"; Animation: Bob Carr	"Show Use"; Animation: John Boersema	February 4, 1963
24	"Phantom Alligator"; Animation: Unknown	"Grandma Outlaw"; Animation: Don Williams	"Injun Trouble"; Animation: Don Patterson	February 11, 1963
25	"Puddle Hopper"; Animation: George Goepper	"Duel Control"; Animation: Don Williams	"Mouse in the House"; Animation: Ed Love	February 18, 1963
26	"Baby Chase"; Animation: Hugh Fraser	"Rapid Rabbit"; Animation: Kenneth Muse	"Crazy Cat Capers"; Animation: Bob Carr	February 25, 1963
27	"Gosh Zilla"; Animation: Allen Wilzbach	"Thumb Hero"; Animation: Ed Love	"Phoney Pony"; Animation: Ed Love	March 4, 1963
28	"Camera Shy Guy"; Animation: Unknown	"Kat-Napped"; Animation: Unknown	"Egg Experts"; Animation: Don Patterson	March 11, 1963
29	"Rebel Rabble"; Animation: George Goepper	"Romeo, Touché, and Juliet"; Animation: Hugh Fraser	"Rabbit Romeo"; Animation: Bob Carr	March 18, 1963
30	"No More Mower"; Animation: Harry Holt	"The Big Bite"; Animation: Don Patterson	"Bird in the Hand"; Animation: Harry Holt	March 25, 1963
31	"Knight Nut"; Animation: Unknown	"Flying Saucer Sorcerer"; Animation: Allen Wilzbach	"Legion Heirs"; Animation: Unknown	April 1, 1963
32	"Ape Scrape"; Animation: George Goepper	"Aladdin's Lampoon"; Animation: Don Patterson	"Hoots and Saddles"; Animation: Unknown	April 8, 1963
33	"Gator-Imitator"; Animation: Unknown	"Haunting License"; Animation: Unknown	"Monster Mix-Up"; Animation: William Keil	April 15, 1963
34	"Safe at Home"; Animation: Unknown	"The Phoney Phantom"; Animation: Ed Love	"Bye-Bye Fly-Guy"; Animation: Harry Holt	April 22, 1963
35	"Balloon Buffoon"; Animation: William Keil	"Touché's Last Stand"; Animation: Hugh Fraser	"Wooden Nickels"; Animation: Ed Love	April 29, 1963
36	"Rassle Dazzle"; Animation: Unknown	"Chief Beef"; Animation: Ed Love	"Two for the Road"; Animation: Edwin Aardal	May 6, 1963
37	"Sea Sick Pals"; Animation: Carlo Vinci	"Like Wild, Man"; Animation: Unknown	"King's X"; Animation: Carlo Vinci	May 13, 1963
38	"Accidentally on Purpose"; Animation: Unknown	"Dum de Dum Dum"; Animation: Unknown	"Amusement Park Lark"; Animation: Robert Bentley	May 20, 1963
39	"Whistle Stopper"; Animation: Unknown	"Et Tu Touché?"; Animation: Unknown	"T for Two"; Animation: Don Williams	May 27, 1963
40	"Birthday Grievings"; Animation: Harry Holt	"Dragon Feat"; Animation: Allen Wilzbach	"Tiny Troubles"; Animation: Ed Love	June 3, 1963
41	"Medicine Avenue"; Animation: Hugh Fraser	"Red Riding Hoodlum"; Animation: Unknown	"Flood for a Thought"; Animation: Bob Carr	June 10, 1963
42	"Marshal Wally"; Animation: Allen Wilzbach	"Dough Nuts"; Animation: Unknown	"Hocus Focus"; Animation: Unknown	June 17, 1963
43	"One Round Trip"; Animation: Don Patterson	"Save the Last Trance for Me"; Animation: Unknown	"Shamrocked"; Animation: Ed Love	June 24, 1963
44	"Gopher Broke"; Animation: Hugh Fraser	"Waterloo for Two"; Animation: Hugh Fraser	"Old Fuddy Duds"; Animation: Bob Carr	July 1, 1963
45	"Gladiator Gator"; Animation: Unknown	"Robin Hoodlum"; Animation: Unknown	"Chow You Feeling"; Animation: Carlo Vinci	July 8, 1963
46	"Bubble Trouble"; Animation: Unknown	"The Shoe Must Go On"; Animation: Don Williams	"Easy Doesn't It"; Animation: Bob Carr	July 15, 1963
47	"Ice Charades"; Animation: Unknown	"Quack Hero"; Animation: Unknown	"Drop Me a Lion"; Animation: Ed Love	July 22, 1963
48	"Creature Feature"; Animation: Unknown	"Aliblabber and the Forty Thieves"; Animation: Allen Wilzbach	"Map Sap"; Animation: Harry Holt	July 29, 1963
49	"Squatter's Rights"; Animation: John Boersema	"Out of This Whirl"; Animation: John Boersema	"Shark Shock"; Animation: John Boersema	August 5, 1963
50	"The Big Drip"; Animation: Ed Parks	"Hero on the Half Shell"; Animation: Unknown	"No Spooking Allowed"; Animation: Unknown	August 12, 1963
51	"Gourmet Gator"; Animation: Hugh Fraser	"Tenderfoot Turtle"; Animation: Unknown	"Me-My-Mine"; Animation: Unknown	August 19, 1963
52	"Carpet Bragger"; Animation: Hugh Fraser	"Peace and Riot"; Animation: Jerry Hathcock	"Together Mess"; Animation: Ed Love	August 26, 1963

== Home media ==
The first episode of the three cartoons is on the DVD Saturday Morning Cartoons: 1960s - Vol. 2.

Wally Gator was released separately as on DVD by Warner Archive on June 25, 2019, with Lippy the Lion following on July 9.

Touché Turtle was released by Warner Archive on Blu-Ray on September 30, 2025, making its physical media debut and the first of these three cartoons to be on Blu-Ray.

In November of that same year, Warner Archive also announced Blu-Ray versions of both Wally Gator and Lippy the Lion and Hardy Har Har - both scheduled for December 16, 2025 - thus making the entirety of The Hanna-Barbera New Cartoon Series available on Blu-Ray.

== See also ==
- List of works produced by Hanna-Barbera Productions
- List of Hanna-Barbera characters
