= Samson & Goliath =

American animated television series

- Also known as: Young Samson
- Created by: William Hanna; Joseph Barbera
- Written by: Tony Benedict; Walter Black; Dalton Sandifer; Ed Brandt
- Directed by: Joseph Barbera; William Hanna
- Voices of: Tim Matheson; Don Messick; John Stephenson
- Narrated by: Don Messick
- Theme music composer: Ted Nichols
- Country of origin: United States
- Original language: English
- No. of episodes: 20

Production
- Producer: Joseph Barbera
- Running time: 30 minutes
- Production company: Hanna-Barbera Productions

Original release
- Network: NBC
- Release: September 9, 1967 – August 31, 1968

Samson & Goliath, also known as Young Samson, is an American animated television series produced by Hanna-Barbera Productions for NBC, where it debuted on September 9, 1967. Primarily sponsored by General Mills, who controlled the distribution rights through its agency Dancer Fitzgerald Sample, Samson & Goliath was retitled Young Samson in April 1968 to avoid confusion with the stop-motion Christian television series Davey and Goliath.

Twenty-six 12-minute episodes of the series were produced, six of which no longer exist. Samson & Goliath cartoons were paired with other General Mills-sponsored shows such as Tennessee Tuxedo and Go Go Gophers to form a full half-hour for their original network broadcasts. Young Samson was later shown in syndication with The Space Kidettes as The Space Kidettes and Young Samson, distributed by The Program Exchange. The rights were acquired by Warner Bros. Television Distribution when it became rights owner of the Hanna-Barbera catalog.

The series was the only Dancer Fitzgerald Sample-sponsored cartoon to be outsourced to Hanna-Barbera; the agency's in-house studio, Gamma Productions, had closed shortly before the series began. It was also the only cartoon in the DFS portfolio not to be created either by Jay Ward Productions or by Total Television.

== Plot ==
The show follows the adventures of a teenager named Samson and his dog, Goliath as they ride around the country on a motorbike. Whenever trouble arises, usually in the form of a menacing mega villain or evil scientist, Samson transforms himself into a superhero version of the biblical Samson by hitting his golden wristbands together. A second slam transforms Goliath into a superpowered lion. He can also direct shock waves from his wristbands, and by twisting his bracelets, can increase his and Goliath's powers to far greater levels.

== Characters ==
- Samson (voiced by Tim Matheson) is a teenager who rides around the country on a motorbike with his dog Goliath. Upon encountering a very tough situation, Samson touches both of his bracelets with each other by crossing his wrists and with the magic words, "I need Samson Power" or "Time for Samson Power", upon which he is transformed into the biblical strong-man, and the lad's dog, who responds to the name of Goliath, metamorphoses into a mighty lion.
- Goliath (vocal effects provided by Don Messick) is Samson's white and black Airedale Terrier, who can transform into a lion via his bracelets. Goliath is a brave and resourceful pet in both his super-powered and non-powered forms. In his dog form, Goliath is an extremely good climber and is much more intelligent than a normal dog. In his lion form, Goliath possesses super-strength and durability and the ability to generate heat and energy.

=== Villains ===
- Monatabu is an evil witch doctor whose tribe punished him for his evil deeds. He leapt into a volcano—but instead of dying, he found an Iguanasaurus. Each year, it emerges from the volcano to attack the village. Samson and Goliath discover the truth and seal the pair inside the volcano permanently.
- The Aurora Borealis Creature results from the Aurora Borealis somehow becoming an electrically charged monster that begins attacking an Inuit village. Samson and Goliath lure it onto an ice floe, and it sinks into the water, thus being destroyed.
- The Colossus of Rhodes is a 100 feet tall statue of the Greek Titan Helios that is brought back from sea by an archaeologist named Professor Andor. Meteorites bring it to life and it goes on a rampage. Samson and Goliath are able to send it back to the bottom of the sea.
- The Venusian Ice Men (voiced by Don Messick) are robots from Venus who can generate vast amounts of ice. They come to Earth to freeze a valley to make it habitable for their kind. Samson and Goliath use a reflecting mirror from a telescope to deflect a freeze ray back at the villains's ship, causing the Ice Men to melt.
- The Terrorists (voiced by Don Messick and John Stephenson) are a band of international terrorists. They steal Goliath's bracelets and replace them with powerless duplicates, but he recovers them and manages to defeat the terrorists.
- P.E.R.I.L. is an evil organization and master spy ring that plotted to capture Professor Talos to keep him from reaching the Pentagon, where he will give the people there his plans for the Solar Jet. Samson and Goliath rescue him and capture the villains after an intense struggle.
  - Monarch (voiced by Don Messick) is the leader of P.E.R.I.L.
  - The Living Element is an anthropomorphic fire monster created by Monarch.
  - P.E.R.I.L. Agents (voiced by John Stephenson) are the organic human foot soldiers of P.E.R.I.L.
  - P.E.R.I.L. Robots are the robotic foot soldiers of P.E.R.I.L.
- Boltor is an evil scientist operating on Evil Island. Samson is captured, on the island, by a tribe who loyally serve a talking flame. He and Goliath discover that Boltor has an underground electronic laboratory and had created the talking flame as well as mechanical sharks. He has also stolen American missiles. Samson and Goliath foil Boltor's plan to launch the missiles, but he sinks the island disappearing for good.
- Zarno the Cruel is an alien based on an asteroid, from which he sends a deadly ray to Earth. Samson and Goliath are teleported to the asteroid, where they defeat Zarno and his Monsteroids.
  - The Monsteroids are asteroid monsters that work for Zarno.
- General Tong seeks to attack a mountain village that is close to his country through a robot idol named Rama-Keesh. The General's purpose is that his government is going to declare war on the country of which the mountain village is part of, and the robot attack will force the villagers to evacuate so his troops can cross the border and begin the invasion.
  - Ramu is General Tong's minion. He turns on his superior when he feels the General has gone too far. Tong orders Rama-Keesh to kill Ramu, but Samson saves Ramu. Ramu is later taken into custody.
  - Rama-Keesh is a robot idol unleashed by General Tong and Ramu on a mountain village. Rama-Keesh is destroyed when it falls into a fire pit, and Tong is stopped.
- Salamandro is a mutant catfish based in an undersea laboratory. He sends two human hijackers to loot the passing cargo ships. Samson and Goliath find their way into the lab, where they escape from a number of death traps. Although they flood the lab, the evil trio escape.
- Hijackers are two men, working in tandem, are sent by Salamandro to steal gold and paintings from a couple of ships. They come close to also stealing a stash of jewels from a third ship, but never get the chance to commit this third crime. None of the stolen goods are ever recovered.
- Baron Von Skull is an elderly flying ace from Germany, who creates evil war machines. Samson and Goliath destroy the machines, but Skull and Tor fly away presumably into the arms of the police.
  - Tor is Skull's assistant.
- Kunev Khan is apparently a long-time enemy of Samson and Goliath. He steals the Graviton and delivers it to the Moon Leader, not realizing the alien intends to double-cross him. After the Moon Leader is defeated, Kunev Khan is flown back to Earth by Samson and Goliath.
  - The Moon Leader is an alien with whom Kunev Khan was allied, who subsequently double-crossed him. The Moon Leader is dispatched and Samson and Goliath fly Kunev and the Graviton back to Earth.
- The Dragon Men are a tribe of possible Mayan ancestry, based in an underground city. Samson and Goliath enter the city via a Mayan pyramid to rescue Professor Kinkaid, who had been captured by these warriors. The Dragon Men are defeated when Goliath's roar breaks open a dam, releasing water that sweeps them away, and also puts out a fire that started when a dragon lizard ignited the sulfur gases.
- Dr. Zuran is yet another mad scientist who captures Professor Cartwell, and gains control of Rogor the robot. He transfers Samson's strength to the mechanical monster, but Goliath restores it. Zuran also tries to kill Cartwell, but Samson saves him just in time. Zuran flies away and Cartwell repairs Rogor, reforming him.
- Darvo and his assistant revive the Coral Creature, which begins attacking a city in Australia. Samson and Goliath cause it to turn against its masters, destroying them and their lighthouse.
  - The Coral Creature is a coral monster which Darvo revived. Following Darvo's defeat, the Coral Creature returns to the sea.
- The Dome and his henchman plot to launch nuclear warheads. Samson and Goliath successfully thwart their efforts.
- Nerod is an avid collector of Roman antiquities who models himself on Nero. He and Servo invite Samson and Goliath to fight robot gladiators and rhinoceros in a replica of the Colosseum. The heroes defeat their foes, and destroy the mansion.
  - Servo is Nerod's henchman.
- Dr. Desto is a scientist who had been experimenting with the time dimension. He brings in a number of past threats, and pits them against Samson and Goliath. All are defeated, and Desto himself is pulled into the past, never to return.
- Narton and The Gill Men emerge from the ocean floor to conquer the surface people. Samson and Goliath beat them at their own game, but Narton gets away vowing to return.
  - The Gill Men are Narton's henchmen.
- The Thing from the Black Mountains is a reptile that is roused from a lake near the Black Mountains by a missile. Samson and Goliath fight it and send it back into the lake.

== Episodes ==
No.	Title	Original release date
1	"The Curse of Monatabu"	September 9, 1967
A giant lizard-like monster emerges from an active volcano on a remote island, frightening the natives. They believe it to be an evil spirit of Monatabu, an evil witch doctor. When Samson and Goliath arrive at the village, the chief of the tribe tells them how they punished Monatabu by making him leap into the volcano. Ever since, his spirit returns every year to seek revenge. The boy and dog go into the volcano for investigation. Samson leaves Goliath, and finds the witch doctor is still alive. Not only that, but the monster is there, too, who is actually a prehistoric Iguanasaurus. Monatabu discovers Samson, and captures him by knocking him out with magic energy from his skull wand. Samson is then tied to a slab. Monatabu reveals that he befriended the Iguanasaurus when he entered the volcano. It is this beast that has been terrorizing the natives. Samson calls Goliath, who unties the ropes, and frees him. Then, Samson becomes the biblical strong man, and Goliath turns into a giant, Super Lion. When things get too tough, Samson uses Super Samson power to make himself and Goliath more powerful. Eventually, they seal Monatabu and the Iguanasaurus inside the volcano for keeps. When they leave, they tell the natives they no longer have anything to fear, and drive away on their motorcycle.
2	"The Aurora Borealis Creature"	September 16, 1967
Upon their visit to the North Pole, Samson and Goliath encountered a gigantic electrically charged monster manifested from the Aurora Borealis, and begin terrorizing an Eskimo village. With the combined efforts of Samson and Goliath, they saved the day.
3	"The Great Colossus"	September 23, 1967
The Colossus of Rhodes comes to life by a mysterious energy from some meteorites, and goes on a rampage. Samson and Goliath send it back into the sea.
4	"Cold Wind from Venus"	September 30, 1967
An A.I pair of android robots from planet Venus arrives on their spaceship on Earth and begin to conquer human world by freezing it with their ice-rays to make the environment suitable and compatible for the Venusian race. When Samson and Goliath thwarts all of their attempts, then as a contingency plan, they initiate their mega-ice ray but again Samson and Goliath foil their plan by deflecting their freeze ray and melting them.
5	"The SSX-19"	October 7, 1967
A group of terrorists are watching the unveiling of the newly developed Super Sonic experimental transport plane called The STX-19 over the monitor. Their leader plans to dismantle the jet and ship it out of the country. For said same purposes, they intrude upon the top secret military area in a Crop-Dusting plane which renders everyone unconscious by the gas, including Samson and Goliath. In order to make sure the duo may not interfere with their scheme, the head of the group slips out Samson's gold power bracelets with imitation's of lead, before finally stealing away the STX-19. Goliath soon comes to his senses and awakens Samson to discover the stealth aircraft is gone. On their way to find the aviary transport, Samson and Goliath seek to engage the felons but are captured by them upon realizing Samson's bands had been replaced with phony's. Samson is put behind the bars, while Goliath succeed in eluding them. Soon Goliath found the real bracelets from the lead terrorist and brings them back to Samson, where he initiates his superpowers and they capture the gang, bringing both the STX-19 and its captors back to the military. However, the title slide says the SSX-19.
6	"Operation Peril"	October 14, 1967
A renowned scientist, Professor Talos is on his way to Pentagon with the plans of Solar Jet. Meanwhile, the agents of P.E.R.I.L, a criminal organization led by Monarch, the head of the organization follows the protocol of Professor Talos. When the Professor Talos' protocol knew the impending danger, they tried to elude them but P.E.R.I.L immobilizes the whole city's transport including cars, bikes, trains and even an Aeroplane with the strange waves. In state of stand still, an aeroplane was about to fall but Samson managed to transform himself on time and saved it from free falling by carry landing it on ground safely. On very moment, P.E.R.I.L succeed in abducting Professor Talos. Samson and Goliath follow P.E.R.I.L's aircraft and both jumps upon it to rescue Professor Talos. P.E.R.I.L saw them coming and tries to get rid of them by rotating the aircraft at different angles but then Goliath hits his paw to create a break-through the aircraft and enters. Upon their entry, the main gate gets closed with five heavy metal slides but Samson twists his bracelets to increase his powers and then ripped out all of the slide doors. They then encounter a pair of robots approaching them with weapons, but Samson throws a heavy rod at them that causes them to short circuit each other out and gets electrocuted. Samson and Goliath then advance to the control room, where Monarch tricked them to fall into his trap to face his most destructive weapon "The Living Element", an anthropomorphic fire monster. Goliath tried to repel The Living Element with his Power Beams and when the monster's extremely hot body touches the steel wall of the aircraft, it gets melted and the monster falls into the water and gets evaporated. Samson and Goliath then returns to the control room and are welcomed by the P.E.R.I.L agent with the LASER gun that Samson managed to blast off and then Monarch tries to eliminate them with the Solar Gun but Goliath whips him with his tail. Monarch falls back and accidentally hits the button that reveals the Professor Talos being held. Goliath warns something to Samson and both saw that the aircraft is heading right for the mountain. Monarch destroys the control panel so that Samson may never clear it but Goliath hold them down. After control panel being destroyed, Samson throws some excess weight out of the aircraft to make it light that results in the aircraft lifting itself up and successfully passing the mountain. They then saved the Professor Talos and the trio returns on land safely.
7	"The Secret of Evil Island"	October 21, 1967
With help from a native named Maori, Samson and Goliath head for Evil Island to investigate the disappearance of a missile. After encounters with mechanical sharks, hostile natives, and a talking flame, they meet Boltor. Boltor launches fifteen missiles, but the heroes destroy them. Boltor pulls a switch that sinks the island, but Samson and Goliath escape just in time.
8	"The Monsteroids"	October 28, 1967
Samson and Goliath are teleported to an asteroid to deal with Zargo, an evil alien, and his robot army, the Monsteroids.
9	"The Idol Rama-Keesh"	November 4, 1967
General Tong and Ramu send Rama-Keesh, a mechanical idol, to terrorize a village. Samson and Goliath break into their temple, destroy the idol, and defeat the villains.
10	"Salamandro"	November 11, 1967
In an undersea laboratory, three villains see a ship passing by. Salamandro, the ringleader of the trio, sends his henchmen to the ship to steal the gold bullion it's carrying. The men enter the transportation machine their boss has invented, and seconds later, materialize on the ship's deck. There, they paralyze the captain and his first mate. Then they go down to the vault, freeze the guard, and remove the gold. One of them sends a signal to Salamandro to let him know they have the loot. He brings them back, and gloats over the successful theft. Sometime later, Samson and Goliath are on a ship carrying a crate load of paintings. The captain expresses concern that the art will be stolen. The heroes go into the vault via a funnel, and hide themselves in the crate that holds the paintings. Salamandro sees the ship go by, and sends his goons directly to the vaults so they won't be seen by anyone. They find the crate, and send another signal. When they open the crate, they are surprised to find Samson and Goliath inside. When the duo transform, the henchmen try to paralyze them, but Goliath melts their guns with his power beams. Salamandro traps the pair inside a steel trap, but Goliath uses his roar to break them out. Noticing that their enemies are gone, Samson and Goliath head for an iron door, but are momentarily stopped by the electro rays that appear on it. Samson lifts the door without touching the rays, and he and Goliath enter the next room. Salamandro is there, but he's behind a glass shield that the heroes can't penetrate. He explains that it's eight feet thick. Then another glass shield appears behind them, and a deadly mist is pumped in. Samson and Goliath escape by crashing through the ceiling. One of the accomplices fires a ray through a hole in the wall, and successfully immobilizes Goliath.
11	"Baron Von Skull"	November 18, 1967
Samson and Goliath meet Baron Von Skull, a former World War One flying ace from Germany.
12	"Moon Rendezvous"	November 25, 1967
Kunev Kahn steals the Graviton. Samson and Goliath sneak aboard his space ship, and find themselves on the moon. There, they deal with both Kunev Kahn, and his partner in crime, the Moon Leader.
13	"The Lost City of the Dragon Men"	December 2, 1967
Samson and Goliath enter an underground city to rescue Professor Kinkaid from the Dragon Men.
14	"The Colossal Coral Creature"	December 9, 1967
A pair of criminals based in a lighthouse revive a coral monster. It attacks an Australian city. Samson and Goliath defeat it. It destroys the lighthouse and returns to the sea.
15	"Zuran's Creature"	December 16, 1967
Samson is temporarily weakened when Dr. Zuran transfers his super strength to a robot.
16	"The Dome"	December 23, 1967
Samson and Goliath prevent the Dome from launching his deadly missiles.
17	"Nerod"	December 30, 1967
Samson and Goliath pit themselves against Nerod's gladiators.
18	"The Terrible Dr. Desto"	January 6, 1968
The appearances and disappearances of a Tyrannosaurus, Cyclops, and Rok, send Samson and Goliath to Dr. Desto's laboratory. He uses his time shield to bring in a variety of menaces from the past. Finally, he sends out a plague of locusts. Samson and Goliath drive the insects back. They are pulled back into the machine, but so is Desto. Samson then destroys the time shield for good to prevent Desto from ever returning.
19	"From Out of the Deep"	January 13, 1968
Samson and Goliath's vacation is interrupted by the Gill Men.
20	"Thing from the Black Mountains"	January 20, 1968
A missile arouses a creature from the water near the Black Mountains. Samson and Goliath stop its rampage, and send it back to its environment.

== Home media ==
On March 8, 2011, Warner Archive released all 20 episodes of The Space Kidettes and Young Samson on DVD in region 1 as part of their Hanna–Barbera Classics Collection. This is a manufacture-on-demand (MOD) release, available exclusively through Warner's online store and Amazon.com. The original network broadcasts of The Space Kidettes and Samson & Goliath were formatted to break up the plot line of each episode to include additional animated content not made by Hanna-Barbera, but which were controlled by the series’ sponsor.

After the network runs ended, both stories were re-edited into continuous scenarios, and the two series were joined together as The Space Kidettes and Young Samson for subsequent forms of distribution. The revised syndication versions of these shows are the only ones available for distribution, as the original network versions were cut and reconformed for the current configuration. These are the versions used for the DVD release.
