= Lucille Bliss =

American actress (1916–2012)

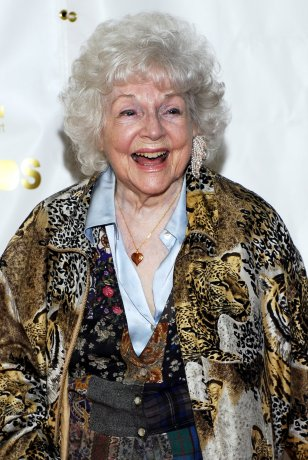
- Bliss at the 34th Annie Awards, 2007
- Born: Lucille Theresa Bliss; March 31, 1916; New York City, U.S.
- Died: November 8, 2012 (aged 96); Costa Mesa, California, U.S.
- Resting place: Hollywood Forever Cemetery
- Occupation: Actress
- Years active: 1935–2007

Lucille Theresa Bliss (March 31, 1916 – November 8, 2012) was an American actress, known in the Bay Area and in Hollywood as the "Girl With a Thousand Voices".

A New York City native, Bliss lent her voice to numerous television characters, including the title character of the first made-for-television cartoon, Crusader Rabbit, Smurfette on the popular 1980s cartoon The Smurfs and Ms. Bitters on the Nickelodeon animated series Invader Zim. In addition to her television roles, she was known for her work as a voice actress in feature films.

== Life and career ==
=== Family ===
Bliss was born to James Francis Bliss, a dentist from Massachusetts, and Frieda Siemens (1886-1969). Her mother, a German emigrant, was a classically trained pianist and wanted her daughter to train as an opera singer. Her parents later divorced. Her father's death in 1935 (or 1928) Frieda and Lucille moved to San Francisco, California to be near relatives, where her mother became head of the music department at the San Francisco College for Women.

=== Radio ===
Bliss was active in old-time radio, having roles in Pat Novak, for Hire (1946 to 1947), Candy Matson (June 29, 1949, to May 20, 1951), and The Charlie McCarthy Show.

=== Film ===
Bliss' first voice work was the role of the wicked stepsister Anastasia Tremaine in Walt Disney's 1950 feature film Cinderella, for which she was honored 50 years later by the Young Artist Foundation with its Former Child Star "Lifetime Achievement" Award in March 2000.

=== Television ===
In the early years of television, Bliss acted in Harbor Command and The Lineup. From 1950 to 1957, Bliss was "Auntie Lou" on San Francisco, California's KRON-TV's The Happy Birthday To You Show, also known as Birthday Party Show, which had guests from adults, to children, to animals. The program included use of Disney cartoon characters, as Bliss "picked up exclusive rights in northern California for the right to use Disney clips on her new show." At the same time, she did voices for Hanna-Barbera while they were working for the Metro-Goldwyn-Mayer cartoon department – as Tuffy in Robin Hoodwinked, as Leprechaun in Droopy Leprechaun and later was Hugo on an episode of The Flintstones. She was also the narrator on three stories from the Disney album "Peter Cottontail and Other Funny Bunnies": "Story of Thumper", :Story of the White Rabbit", and "Story of Grandpa Bunny". Bliss was also a voice-over performer for Airborne radio spots in 2004.

"She lost her job as Elroy Jetson, she told interviewers, when she wouldn't work under a stage name that would hide the fact that she was a grown woman playing a little boy, which is a common scenario in cartoons."

=== Volunteer efforts ===
Bliss produced and directed talent shows for the Marin YMCA in San Rafael and Embarcadero Armed Services YMCA in San Francisco, which included service personnel with professional career hopes.

== Personal life ==
Bliss died from natural causes on 8 November 2012, in Costa Mesa, California, at the age of 96. She never married and left no survivors. A memorial service was held 20 November 2012 at Hollywood Forever Cemetery.

== Filmography ==
- Cinderella (1950) – Anastasia Tremaine (Credit cut)
- Crusader Rabbit (1950–52) – Crusader Rabbit
- Alice in Wonderland (1951) – Daisy / Tulip (Uncredited)
- Peter Pan (1953) – Mermaid (Uncredited)
- A Kiddies Kitty (1955) – Suzanne (Uncredited)
- The Waggily Tale (1958) – Little Girl/Mama (Uncredited)
- Robin Hoodwinked (1958) – Tuffy
- Droopy Leprechaun (1958) – Leprechaun
- How to Have an Accident at Work (1959) – Donald's son
- The Flintstones (1960) – Hugo (episode "The Good Scout", Uncredited)
- 101 Dalmatians (1961) – TV Commercial Singer
- The Space Kidettes (1966–67) – Snoopy
- Funnyman (1967) – Girl of 1000 voices
- The Tiny Tree (1975) – Field Mouse
- The Flintstones' Christmas (1977) – Bamm-Bamm Rubble
- The Flintstones: Little Big League (1978) – Dusty
- Casper the Friendly Ghost: He Ain't Scary, He's Our Brother (1979) – Gervais, Carmelita, Nice Lady
- Hug Me (1981)
- The Smurfs (1981–89) – Smurfette
- The Secret of NIMH (1982) – Mrs. Beth Fitzgibbons
- The Great Bear Scare (1983) – Miss Witch
- Chuck E. Cheese - The Christmas That Almost Wasn't (1983) – Mrs. Claus
- Strong Kids, Safe Kids (1984) – Pebbles Flintstone/Bamm-Bamm Rubble/Smurfette/Baby Smurf
- Cap'n O. G. Readmore (1985–92) – Lickety Page
- Rainbow Brite: San Diego Zoo Adventure (1986) – Narrator
- Assassination (1987) – Crone
- The Night Before (1988) – Gal Baby
- Miracle Mile (1988) – Old Woman in Diner
- Betty Boop's Hollywood Mystery (1989) – Miss Green
- Asterix and the Big Fight (1989) – Impedimenta (aka Bonnemine)
- Tales of the City (1993) – Cable Car Lady
- Thumbelina Narrated by Mayim Bialik (1994) – Miscellaneous (video game)
- Space Quest VI: The Spinal Frontier (1995) – Sharpei/Waitron (video game)
- Wacked (1997) – Jane Katz
- Invader Zim (2001–02; 2006) – Ms. Bitters
- Star Wars: Bounty Hunter (2002) – Rozatta (video game)
- Battlestar Galactica (2003) – Shaden (video game)
- Blue Harvest Days (2005) – Bear Brat
- Robots (2005) – Pigeon Lady
- Avatar: The Last Airbender (2005) – Yugoda
- Up-In-Down Town (2007) – Quinby

== Recognition ==
In 2000, she won ASIFA-Hollywood's Winsor McCay Award.
