= Touché Turtle and Dum Dum =

American animated television series

- Genre: Comedy
- Directed by: William Hanna; Joseph Barbera
- Voices of: Bill Thompson; Alan Reed
- Country of origin: United States
- Original language: English
- No. of seasons: 1
- No. of episodes: 52 (list of episodes)

Production
- Producers: William Hanna; Joseph Barbera
- Running time: 7 minutes (per short)
- Production company: Hanna-Barbera Productions

Original release
- Network: First-run syndication
- Release: September 3, 1962 – August 26, 1963

Touché Turtle and Dum Dum is an American animated television series produced by Hanna-Barbera Productions that originally aired as one of the three segments on the anthology show The Hanna-Barbera New Cartoon Series from September 3, 1962, to August 26, 1963. The other two segments that compose the series are Wally Gator and Lippy the Lion and Hardy Har Har.

Following its first airing, Touché Turtle and Dum Dum was later repeated several times on the BBC in the United Kingdom as a standalone show during the 1970s and 1980s, and then part of the Children's BBC service in the late 1980s and early 1990s.

== Overview ==
The show’s leads Touché Turtle (left) and Dum Dum (right)

Touché Turtle (voiced by Bill Thompson, known for voicing Droopy) and his dim-witted sheepdog sidekick Dum Dum (voiced by Alan Reed, known for voicing Fred Flintstone) are a pair of heroic fencers who battle villains and heroically save kings, queens, and others in distress. Touché is the brave (if not entirely competent) leader brandishing his trusty sword and exclaiming his catchphrase "Touché away!" He wears a plumed musketeer-type hat. Dum Dum is more of a simple-minded follower in a smaller plumed hat and a scarf.

During the run of the show, Touché Turtle uses a standard fencing foil as a weapon. Though not particularly bright, he is an accomplished fencer and can hold his own against other sword-fighting opponents. Despite his expertise at fencing, Touché always mispronounces the word "sword" when speaking. He always pronounces the "w" rather than leaving it silent, resulting in his constantly pronouncing the word "suh-wohrd."

The series does not follow any lasting timeline or continuity. Touché has adventures in the Old West and in the Middle Ages, as well as battling villains during the modern era of the 1960s.

A running gag in nearly every episode shows him keeping a telephone inside his shell, and it rings at inopportune moments when someone calls for help. Touché will politely excuse himself, duck into his shell, and take the call regardless of where he is at the time.

== Home media ==
The first episode, "Whale of a Tale", is available on the DVD Saturday Morning Cartoons 1960's Vol. 2. "Rapid Rabbit" is available on DVD on disc 2 of The Best of Warner Bros.: Hanna-Barbera 25 Cartoon Collection.

A Blu-ray collection of the complete series was released by Warner Archive on September 30, 2025.

== Other appearances ==
- Touché Turtle and Dum Dum appear in Yogi's Ark Lark and its sequel series Yogi's Gang. In those appearances, Touché Turtle is voiced by Don Messick due to the death of Bill Thompson in 1971 while Dum Dum has no dialogue.
- Messick also voices Touché Turtle in Yogi's Treasure Hunt.
- Dum Dum appears in the Harvey Birdman, Attorney at Law episode "Mindless", voiced by Maurice LaMarche. He and Touché Turtle make cameos in the video game adaption where Dum Dum is voiced again by LaMarche.
- Touché Turtle and Dum Dum both appear in DC Comics Deathstroke/Yogi Bear Special #1 as captured animals alongside other Hanna-Barbera characters.
- Touché Turtle appears in the Wacky Races episode "Slow and Steady", voiced by Billy West.
- Touché Turtle and Dum Dum both appear in the HBO Max original series Jellystone!. In the show, Touché Turtle works in the Jellystone Police Department as the chief of police, voiced by Dana Snyder.
