= Dinky Dog =

- DVD cover
- Directed by: Ray Patterson; Carl Urbano; Chris Cuddington
- Voices of: Frank Welker; Frank Nelson; Julie Bennett; Jackie Joseph
- Theme music composer: Hoyt Curtin
- Composer: Hoyt Curtin
- Countries of origin: Australia; United States
- Original language: English
- No. of episodes: 16 (32 segments)

Production
- Executive producers: William Hanna; Joseph Barbera
- Producer: Alex Lovy
- Running time: 11 minutes
- Production company: Hanna-Barbera Pty. Ltd.

Original release
- Network: CBS (1978–1981)
- Release: September 9, 1978 – September 5, 1981

Dinky Dog is a Saturday-morning animated series produced by the Australian division of Hanna-Barbera, which aired on CBS from September 9, 1978, to September 5, 1981. It was Hanna-Barbera's first show created and produced in Australia.

Dinky Dog was originally broadcast as an 11-minute segment on The All New Popeye Hour. When The All New Popeye Hour was shortened to a half-hour and retitled The Popeye and Olive Comedy Show in September 1981, Dinky Dog was spun off into a show of its own, packing two 11-minute installments per half-hour episode.

== Summary ==
The show is about two girls: ditzy and beautiful blonde haired Sandy (voiced by Jackie Joseph) and smart, sensible, bespectacled brunette Monica (voiced by Julie Bennett), living with their Uncle Dudley (voiced by Frank Nelson). Sandy buys a cute puppy named Dinky (voiced by Frank Welker), which suddenly grows to the size of a polar bear. Sandy is now stuck dragging Monica into always finding work and different ways to repair the damages Dinky causes at their poor uncle's expense. Sure enough, however, Dinky always seems to fix things in an unexpected way and is forgiven, much to Uncle Dudley's dislike.

In the second portion of the series, Dudley takes the nieces for a world tour on a rented leisure boat, giving Dinky a chance to cause mishap on the different continents for more adventures.

== Episodes ==
Nº	Titles	Air date
1	"To Boo or Not to Boo"	1978-09-09
2	"Dinky Ahoy!"	1978-09-16
3	"Dinky at the Circus"	1978-09-23
4	"Dinky's Nose for News"	1978-09-30
5	"Camp Kookiehaha"	1978-10-07
6	"Foggy Doggy"	1978-10-14
7	"Dinky the Movie Star"	1978-10-21
8	"Attic Antics"	1978-10-28
9	"Heap Cheap Motel"	1978-11-04
10	"Bark in the Park"	1978-11-11
11	"Flabby Arms Farm"	1978-11-18
12	"The Bow-Wow Blues Band"	1978-11-25
13	"Easel Does It"	1978-12-02
14	"Dinky at the Bat"	1978-12-09
15	"Phi Beta Dink"	1978-12-16
16	"Abominable Dinky"	1978-12-23
17	"Dinky and the Caveman"	1979-01-06
18	"Rinky Dinky"	1979-01-13
19	"Bad Luck Bow-Wow"	1979-01-20
20	"A Hair of the Dog"	1979-01-27
21	"Sir Dinky Dog"	1979-02-03
22	"First Prize Pooch"	1979-02-10
23	"Department Store Dinky"	1979-02-17
24	"A Hop and a Dink"	1979-02-24
25	"Castaway Canine"	1979-03-03
26	"Gondola, But Not Forgotten"	1979-03-10
27	"Like It or Lamp It"	1979-09-10
28	"Lochness Mess"	1979-09-17
29	"There's No Place Like Home"	1979-09-24
30	"Buckingham Bow Wow"	1979-10-01
31	"Rockhead Hound"	1979-10-08
32	"Tree's a Crowd"	1979-10-15

== Voice cast ==
=== Main cast ===
- Dinky - Frank Welker
- Uncle Dudley - Frank Nelson
- Monica - Julie Bennett
- Sandy - Jackie Joseph

=== Additional voices ===
- Roger Behr
- Ted Cassidy
- Ross Martin
- Don Messick
- Pat Parris
- William Schallert
- Hal Smith
- John Stephenson

== Home media ==
Visual Entertainment released Dinky Dog: The Complete Series on DVD in Region 1 (Canada only) on February 19, 2008. In October 2011, VEI (distributed by Millennium Entertainment) released the complete series on DVD in the US.

DVD name	Ep #	Region 1 (CAN)	Region 1 (US)
Dinky Dog: The Complete Series	16	February 19, 2008	October 4, 2011
