= Chris Cuddington =

Australian animation director

Chris Cuddington is an Australian animation director who worked at Hanna-Barbera Australia studios in Sydney during the 1970s and 1980s.

At Hanna-Barbera (Australia), he was Animation Director for the following TV series:

- Clue Club (1976)
- The Robonic Stooges (1977)
- Wonder Wheels (1977)
- The All New Popeye Hour (1978)
- Dinky Dog (1978)
- Drak Pack (1980)
- The Kwicky Koala Show (1981)

Previously in 1972, he was the storyboard artist of Around the World in 80 Days.
