= My Little Pony (disambiguation) =

My Little Pony is an entertainment franchise developed by Hasbro.

My Little Pony may also refer to:

== Film ==
- My Little Pony: The Movie (1986 film), a 1986 animated film
- My Little Pony: The Movie (2017 film), a 2017 animated film
- My Little Pony: A New Generation, a 2021 animated film

== Print media ==
- My Little Pony (Egmont comics), a British series of comics published by Egmont Group between 1985 and 1994
- My Little Pony (IDW Publishing), an American group of comic book series issued by IDW Publishing since 2012

== Television ==
- My Little Pony (TV special), a 1984 animated special
- My Little Pony (TV series), an American animated television series which debuted in 1986
- My Little Pony Tales, an American animated television series which ran in 1992
- My Little Pony: Friendship Is Magic, an animated television series which debuted in 2010
- My Little Pony: Pony Life is an animated television series which debuted in 2020
- My Little Pony: Make Your Mark, a series continuation of A New Generation
- My Little Pony: Forever Friendship, an animated YouTube series which will debut in 2027

== Toyline ==
- My Little Pony (1982 toyline)
- My Little Pony (2003 toyline)
- My Little Pony (2010 toyline)
- My Little Pony: Equestria Girls, a spin-off franchise which debuted in 2013

== See also ==
- My Little Pony: Equestria Girls (disambiguation)
- My Little Puny, Dutch drag queen
