= List of My Little Pony (1986) characters =

This is a list of characters from the My Little Pony segments in the 1986–87 animated anthology series My Little Pony 'n Friends.

The first My Little Pony television series was preceded by two specials: My Little Pony (1984, incorporated into the series as "Escape from Midnight Castle") and Escape from Catrina (1985, retitled "Escape from Katrina" in the series). The popularity of the specials inspired the animated series. 65 episodes aired from September 15, 1986, to September 25, 1987. A feature-length movie, My Little Pony: The Movie, was released June 6, 1986, three months before the series premiered. In the series, characters typically alternated between starring roles and cameo appearances.

== Major characters ==
Megan

Voiced by: Tammy Amerson (Rescue at Midnight Castle, Escape from Catrina, My Little Pony: The Movie), Bettina Bush (TV series)
Megan Williams is an American teenage girl and the eldest of three children. She became the main character of the first My Little Pony series. She and her siblings live on a ranch where her family keeps a horse, TJ, and a bull. Gentle and motherly, but also mature and resourceful, she acts as the Little Ponies' leader, and in times of crisis they often fly across the rainbow to find her. She keeps the Rainbow of Light, a special locket which contains a powerful rainbow, to defeat anything that is evil threatening the ponies.

Note: Although Megan's surname (Williams) and age (thirteen) appear in the writer's guide for My Little Pony 'n Friends, they have never been mentioned in the series itself.

Danny

Voiced by: Scott Menville
Danny Williams is Megan's younger brother and the second oldest of the three children. He is a rambunctious redhead, who is sometimes fond of jokes although he doesn't usually do them to hurt someone's feelings. Danny sometimes feuds with his little sister Molly, and he is sometimes found leading the charge when a situation calls for reckless action.

Molly

Voiced by: Keri Houlihan
Molly Williams is Megan and Danny's younger sister and the youngest of the three children. Molly can be often scared around monsters and ghosts, but never too scared to fight with Danny. She is very caring, especially towards Baby Ponies.

Spike

Voiced by: Charlie Adler
Spike is a baby dragon with purple and green scales who is adopted by Megan and the ponies after they defeated Tirek. He has a sarcastic streak but is very supportive to the ponies and the three children.

== Minor characters ==
The Moochick

Voiced by: Tony Randall
The Moochick is a wise but eccentric gnome. He is very knowledgeable and provides answers to more unusual problems; when he's able to remember them. He lives in a secluded place in Dream Valley with his assistant Habbit the rabbit and is shown to have temporary amnesia.

The Bushwoolies

Voiced by: Alice Playten, Sheryl Bernstein, Susan Blu, Nancy Cartwright, Russi Taylor, Charlie Adler, Frank Welker
The Bushwoolies are a group of adorable, colourful furry creatures. They seem incapable of independent thought, thinking, speaking and acting as a group. They rarely even use their individual names, which include Chumster, Hugster and Wishful.

The Fur-bobs

Voiced by: Unknown
The Fur-bobs are the cousins to the Bushwoolies, and similar in character save for one noticeable difference: Fur-bobs always disagree with each other on any and every given opportunity, even if the disagreement makes no logical sense. They also tend to walk on four legs instead of two (though they're capable of walking/running either way) and possess a deep-seated fear and hatred of the Stonebacks, to the extent that the Fur-bobs constantly relocate their home territory ("Furbobbia") just to avoid being around them.

The Stonebacks

Voiced by: Unknown
The Stonebacks are Giant armadillo-like creatures feared and hated by the Fur-bobs. Megan discovers that the Stonebacks, who lack the ability to speak and can only snort and grunt, only want to befriend the Furbobs, but have no way of communicating it.

The Grundle King

Voiced by: Danny DeVito
The Grundle King is the leader of the Grundles. He seems to be rather ugly but sweet, sometimes speaks in rhymes, and is not very smart, but has a kind heart. He and the rest of the Grundles used to live in Grundleland before Hydia smoozed it and now reside in the remains of Dream Castle.

The Grundles

Voiced by: Susan Blu, Peter Cullen, Frank Welker, and Michael Bell
The Grundles are a small race of goblin-like creatures led by the Grundle King. They used to live in Grundleland before Hydia smoozed it and now reside in the remains of Dream Castle. They may look like monsters, but they are friendly.

== The Ponies ==
=== Unicorn Ponies ===
Unicorn Ponies each possess a unique magical ability, in addition to the power to teleport by 'winking in and out' although not all of them were seen using it.

Name	Gender	Body Color	Hair Color	Cutie Mark	Year of toy/Animation Debut	Animation Debut	Voiced by
Buttons/Baby Buttons	Female	Lavender-Pink	Blue with a Red Streak in Mane	Three Dark Pink Buttons (Buttons); Four Dark Pink buttons and two blue stars (Baby Buttons)	1985	My Little Pony: The Movie (Buttons Debut); My Little Pony (TV series) (Buttons Current/Baby Buttons Debut)	Sheryl Bernstein (Buttons, My Little Pony: The Movie); Susan Blu (Buttons, My Little Pony Series)
Buttons loves to decorate her dresses with beautiful buttons. One night, when all the ponies were asleep, she decorated Ponyland with a basket of buttons. In the morning, the ponies looked outside their windows and were delighted to see buttons glittering in fluffy clouds and twinkling in trees. Buttons wove buttons in their hair to finish her unusual decorations. She is also Telekinetic with her magic and is sometimes bossy. Her daughter is Baby Buttons, who like her mother is probably telekinetic as well. Baby Buttons was only made in Germany as a toy. She appears only briefly in episode 'Crunch the Rockdog' and her cutie mark isn't shown.
Fizzy	Female	Turquoise	Pink, White, dark pink and dark green	Five white fizzy sodas in pink cups and with pink sippers	1986	My Little Pony: The Movie (Debut); My Little Pony (TV series) (Current)	Katie Leigh
Fizzy is described to be a bit of an airhead but sometimes lovable and laid-back. Her horn can make bubbles from water or air and can move them around, though she doesn't always have complete control. Her favourite drink is soda.
Galaxy	Female	Pinkish Purple	Red, pink, white and orange	Purple stars arranged in the shape of the Big Dipper	1986	My Little Pony (TV series)	Sherry Lynn
Galaxy is described to be quite intelligent, resourceful, and seen as the voice of reason though can be also insecure sometimes. She has a magical intuition and can generate light and heat with her horn. She often gazes out the window before going to sleep.
Gusty/Baby Gusty	Female	White	Green with a Red Streak in Mane	Five purple maple leaves (in common versions glittery) (Gusty)/Three purple maple leaves (Baby Gusty)	1984	My Little Pony: The Movie (Debut); My Little Pony (TV series) (Current)	Nancy Cartwright (As Gusty); Katie Leigh (As Baby Gusty)
Gusty is a very popular unicorn pony who has an impatient streak and is very grouchy thus she sometimes acts recklessly. She is also very athletic and brave and can use her horn to summon the wind. She likes autumn because then she can play with leaves. She has one daughter named Baby Gusty, who shares the same impatient streak as her mother and is close to Baby Ribbon. She can wink in and out well but, unlike mother, she seems to be a bit cowardly as when most of babies were fighting the ghost, she hid under blanket.
Mimic	Female	Light Yellow-Green	Chartreuse, yellow, red, light pink and green	Red and yellow parrot	1986	My Little Pony (TV series)	Ellen Gerstell
Mimic is a unicorn pony and the descendant of the first unicorn in Ponyland. With the power of the Golden Horseshoes, she can make a cloud to fly on, strong light and is telepathic and precognitive/intuitive. However it remains unknown whether she has other powers as she was never seen using any. After she fell ill, Megan and the Ponies goes in search for the Golden Horseshoes to restore Mimic's health back to normal. Mimic only appeared in the episode "The Golden Horseshoes". She is good with solving puzzles.
Ribbon/Baby Ribbon	Female	Blue	Neon Yellow with red streak in mane	White ribbon	1986	My Little Pony: The Movie; My Little Pony (TV series)	Katie Leigh (Ribbon) Sherry Lynn (Baby Ribbon)
Ribbon is very mature and motherly to her daughter, Baby Ribbon. She also cares about the others as well and is good in decorating. And is also Telepathic, in which she uses it to contact Megan while she was captured at Tambelon. Her daughter, Baby Ribbon, has a lot of difficulty winking in and out and is close to Baby Gusty. She is possibly telepathic like her mother.

=== Pegasus Ponies ===
Pegasus Ponies can fly using their featured wings, with the ability to carry considerable weight into the air with them. All of the Pegasus Ponies except North Star, Surprise, Locket, Twilight and babies (excluding Baby Lofty) have cameos in 'Baby, It's Cold Outside'.

Name	Gender	Body Color	Hair Color	Cutie Mark	Year of toy/Animation Debut	Animation Debut	Voiced by
Heart Throb/Baby Heart Throb	Female	Pink	Dark Pink	Four pink hearts with silver wings (in common versions the wings are glittery) (Heart Throb)/Three pink hearts (Baby Heart Throb)	1985	My Little Pony (TV series)	Katie Leigh
For Heart Throb, every day is Valentine's Day. She makes heart-shaped presents for everyone and spreads joyous messages of love and happiness to all who live on the far side of the rainbow and loves dressing up and race in the air. She also dreams about meeting prince to marry him. She has a daughter named Baby Heart Throb, who dreams of singing on stage with Knight Shade. She also was the first pony who trusted him. Their cutie marks were swapped in the cartoon.
Locket	Female	Pink	White, pink, orange and purple	Two pink keys and one purple key	1985	My Little Pony (TV series)	Ellen Gerstell
Locket likes fly very fast and alongside Heart Throb and Twilight (Pegasus), they all venture into the Cloud Castle.
Lofty/Baby Lofty	Female	Pale Yellow	Yellow	Pink Hot air balloon surrounded by six dark orange stars	1985	My Little Pony: The Movie (Original Appearance); My Little Pony (TV series) (Series Appearance)	Lofty; Susan Blu (Movie); Ellen Gerstell (Series); Baby Lofty; Susan Blu (Movie); Jill Wayne (Series)
An explorer pony, Lofty loves exploring the mountains and she can fly higher than any other pony in Ponyland. She is very brave but a bit impulsive. Her daughter is Baby Lofty, who is clumsy and dreams of mastering flight, although in some episodes she doesn't have any troubles with flying. She also lisps sometimes, but despite this she sings well.
Masquerade	Female	Yellow	Dark green, aqua, light green and chartreuse	Two pink and three aqua masks	1986	My Little Pony (TV series)	Jeannie Elias
Masquerade is a master of disguise, and loves dressing up. Unfortunately her disguises don't always workout, as in 'Fugitive Flowers' she was quickly unmasked.
North Star/Baby North Star	Female	Pink	Purple	Purple and blue compass rose and blue star (North Star)/Purple compass rose and blue 'north star' (Baby North Star)	1985	My Little Pony: The Movie (Original Appearance); My Little Pony (TV series) (Series Appearance)	North Star; Cathy Cavadini (Movie); B.J Ward (Series); Baby North Star; Robbie Lee
North Star is an explorer Pegasus Pony with a strong British accent. She has a good sense of direction, though she can be easily frazzled. She has a daughter named Baby North Star, though the two were never shown together in one episode. Baby North Star is one of the first tooth ponies, in charge of taking care of the twins Snookums and Sniffles and Milkweed and Tumbleweed. Like the other baby ponies, she has one tooth and was involved in a feud against Fudgey McSwain and Rocky Ripple. Despite being younger than Baby Lofty she flies well.
Paradise	Female	White	Red	Two green palm trees and an orange crescent moon	1985	My Little Pony: The Movie (First) My Little Pony (TV series) (Second)	Susan Blu
Paradise is a lover of legends and lore and a storyteller for the Baby Ponies. She can be naive sometimes and dreams about world like in stories.
Surprise/Baby Surprise	Female	White	Neon Yellow	Five purple balloons with pink strings (in common versions the balloons are glittery) (Surprise)/Glittery purple balloon with pink string (Baby Surprise)	1984	My Little Pony (TV series)	B.J. Ward
Surprise is a mischievous sort. She is utterly loud and hyper and often shouts her own name when doing the unexpected. Lauren Faust stated that her personality and her cutie mark is the basis for the Friendship is Magic incarnation of Pinkie Pie. Baby Surprise appears only in 'Escape from Katrina'. She is very playful just like mother. The two were never shown together.
Twilight (Pegasus)	Female	Purple	Light Pink	White candle with yellow flame and candleholder	1985	My Little Pony (TV series)	Noelle North
Not to be confused with the Unicorn Twilight. Twilight is a very brave pegasus pony who alongside Locket and Heart Throb venture into the Cloud Castle. She likes dancing in candlelight. She also makes cameo in 'Somnambula'.
Whizzer	Female	Pink	Purple, blue, green and pale green	Five pink and purple propeller beanies	1986	My Little Pony (TV series)	Jeannie Elias
Whizzer is Ponyland's fastest flier (always wins races), and its fastest speaker (though only sometimes). She's very dependable, but also very hasty on her actions.
Wind Whistler	Female	Light Blue	Light Pink	Five pink whistles	1986	My Little Pony: The Movie (Debut); My Little Pony (TV series) (Current)	Sarah Partridge
Wind Whistler is erudite, smart and very logical on things, with others finding Wind Whistler confusing or think her cold-hearted due to her bad habit of being a bit of a downer. Despite this she cares a lot about her friends. She is close with Megan and was the only one to turn back and save Megan from fire in 'The Magic Coins'.

=== Earth Ponies ===
Earth Ponies are the most like real horses, without horns, wings or other fanciful additions. However several Earth Ponies had their special talents. They are also notably good jumpers.

Name	Gender	Body Color	Hair Color	Cutie Mark	Year of toy/Animation Debut	Animation Debut	Voiced by
Cherries Jubilee	Female	Peach	Coral	Five pairs of red cherries with green stems	1985	My Little Pony (TV series)	Sherry Lynn
Cherries Jubilee is the keeper of the Paradise Estate's orchards. She has a mature attitude and is sometimes a bit strict to some ponies. Big, red juicy cherries are her favourite snack. She carefully tends to the cherry trees in the orchard and enjoys making beautiful decorations form the pretty pink cherry blossom petals. On the Cherry Blossom parade her float is always the prettiest. She also likes sports.
Cupcake	Female	White	Aqua	Five Orange cupcakes with pink icing	1985	My Little Pony (TV series)	Russi Taylor (Original series)
Cupcake is a talented cook and chef in the Paradise Estates. She is motherly and wise, and usually found in the kitchens baking delicious treats.
Gingerbread	Female	White	Blue, Purple, Light Pink and Pale Purple	Six blue gingerbread men	1985	My Little Pony: The Movie (First); My Little Pony (TV series) (Second)	Sherry Lynn
Having a daredevil streak, Gingerbread is a talented baker and jumper. She is also very optimistic and always thinks positively on things. Appears as a non-speaking part in the movie.
Knight Shade	Male	White	Purple	None	1986	My Little Pony (TV series)	Unknown
Knight Shade is an earth pony and a rock and roll star who performs from town to town alongside his band, the Shadowettes. Beneath the success, however, he is a troubled pony. His manager Zeb works for Arabus, a creature that looks like a storm cloud, who gives Knight Shade orders to steal shadows that he uses for energy. Knight Shade recounts how Zeb acquires the shadows and keeps them in his satchel, as well as anecdotes from life as a struggling singer on his hometown of Bright Valley. Arabus promised him fame but for a price – the theft of everyone's shadows, including his own mother's. Knight Shade tried to back out of the deal, but was forced to stay with Arabus for fear that his shadow would be taken too; something which would mean the end of his career and no chance of restoring his home. The ponies helped him to redeem himself and expose Zeb and Arabus's evil doings, and get everyone's shadows back. Despite his mother and countrymen all look like horses, Knight Shade himself is more like the little ponies, albeit without a cutie mark.
Lickety-Split/Baby Lickety-Split	Female	Lavender Pink	Light Pink	Six pink ice cream cones with white ice cream (As Lickety-Split); 3 pink ice cream cones with white ice cream (As Baby Lickety-Split)	1985	Escape from Catrina (Cameo); My Little Pony: The Movie (as Baby Lickety-Split); My Little Pony (TV series)	Lickety-Split; Katie Leigh; Baby Lickety-Split; Alice Playten (movie), Jeannie Elias (series)
Lickety-Split is an abrasive cynic Earth Pony with an ice cream addiction. Lickety-Split also enjoys planning surprise birthday parties for her friends and makes sure there's much delicious ice cream to accompany the cake. Whenever a pony is feeling sad, Lickety-Split will cheer her up with one of her special ice cream creations. She has a daughter named Baby Lickety-Split who loves to be in centre of attention thus causing a lot of troubles. She later appears as first tooth baby even though she wasn't one before. In the episode "Ice Cream Wars", she and the others was involved in a feud against Fudgey McSwain and Rocky Ripple. She finds ice cream the best food ever.
Magic Star	Female	Yellow	Green	Pink and green magic wand tied with a pink ribbon	1985	My Little Pony: The Movie (First); My Little Pony (TV series) (Second)	Ellen Gerstell (Movie); Jeannie Elias (Series)
Magic Star is an earth pony who is always fascinated with magic and collects lucky charms. There are times where she seems to take on a leadership role. She is also good jumper. According to backyard stories, Magic Star has magic wand that makes wishes come true.
Posey	Female	Light Yellow	Pink	Six pink tulips with green stems	1985	Escape From Catrina (First Appearance); My Little Pony (TV series) (Second Appearance)	Nancy Cartwright
Posey is the gardener of Paradise Estates. Posey is very motherly to all the baby ponies and tends to the Paradise Estate's garden. She loves flowers and other pretty things and is always willing to help those in need although used to judge others by appearance. According to Lauren Faust, Posey is the inspiration for the Friendship is Magic incarnation of Fluttershy.
Scoops	Female	White	Purple	Eleven pink ice cream sundaes in purple cups	1986	My Little Pony (TV series)	Ellen Gerstell
Scoops is an Earth Pony and an Ice Cream Shop owner. She is the owner of the Satin Slipper Sweet Shoppe on where she serves ice cream and sundaes to everyone in Ponyland.
Shady/Baby Shady	Female	Dark Pink	Dirty Yellow	Five pairs of sunglasses (Shady)/Three pairs of sunglasses (Baby Shady)	1986	My Little Pony: The Movie (Debut); My Little Pony (TV series) (Regular appearance)	Jill Wayne (As Shady); Katie Leigh (As Baby Shady)
Shady is an Earth Pony who is always timid and somewhat doubting herself of her actions. She even thinks she brings bad luck but it is just her imagination. She also likes wearing her sunglasses in sunny days. Her daughter is Baby Shady, who has an opposite personality (she sometimes teases other babies but likes cheering them up as well) as her mother's but sort of naive.
Sundance/Baby Sundance	Female	White	Pink	Pink Circular Pattern of 4 Hearts, 5 Dots and 4 Triangles	1985	Escape from Catrina (As Sundance); My Little Pony: The Movie (As Baby Sundance)	Sundance; Laura Dean; Baby Sundance; Katie Leigh (movie); Sherry Lynn (TV)
Sundance is described to be an important Pony to Megan. She is also a great jumper, but sometimes she can be clumsy and very klutzy, which makes the other ponies angry at her. In series she is non-speaking character. Her daughter is Baby Sundance, who is braver than other babies and likes parties.
Sweet Stuff	Female	Light Blue	Purple, pink, light pink and white	Three purple and three pink gumdrops	1985	My Little Pony: The Movie	Laurel Page (movie); Jeannie Elias (TV)
Sweet Stuff is a soft-spoken earth pony. She is constantly apologetic, and sometimes unsure of herself and her actions despite being very smart. She also makes delicious gumdrops.
Truly	Female	White	Dark Pink	Blue dove and four pink hearts	1985	My Little Pony (TV series)	Nancy Cartwright
Truly is a bossy pony who speaks with a Southern American accent. She likes to dress up, but sometimes a little snooty and stubborn. Truly also leads the baby ponies' band and seems to be the one in charge of the nursery.

=== Flutter Ponies ===
Flutter Ponies are ponies with tiny bodies, curly hair, longer legs than regular ponies and fairy-like wings. The Flutter Ponies may appear delicate, but in truth, they possess a powerful ability called the Utter Flutter, which allows them to blow away everything in their path by flapping their wings in a rapid speed. They are rarely seen, preferring to live in seclusion, usually in Flutter Valley. Honeysuckle, Morning Glory and Rosedust were the only notable ones in the first My Little Pony series. In the movie a lot of Flutter ponies are seen although they have no cutie marks and weren't produced as toys. In Bright Lights appear duplicates of Forget-Me-Not, Peach Blussom, Morning Glory, Honeysuckle and Lily.

Name	Gender	Body Color	Hair Color	Cutie Mark	Year of toy/Animation Debut	Animation Debut	Voiced by
Forget-Me-Not	Female	Purple	White	Fifteen pink and yellow forget-me-nots, one forget-me-not on left cheek	1986	My Little Pony (TV series)	B. J. Ward
Forget-Me-Not is a clever Flutter Pony, who is usually smart. She is very knowledgeable on things, especially on the appearance of Tambelon. She likes making parties.
Honeysuckle	Female	Pink	Light pink	Five Pink and yellow Honeysuckle Flowers, one honeysuckle flower on her forehead	1986	My Little Pony (TV series)	Nancy Cartwright
Honeysuckle is shown to be argumentative to the other Flutter Ponies but sometimes respective to Rosedust. She is shown to be quite intelligent, as she was the only one to see through the fake rainbow, Hydia made. She changes the season from Autumn to Winter.
Lily	Female	Pink	Purple	Red Lily plant with green stem, one lily on her forehead	1986	My Little Pony (TV series)	N/A
Only appeared in background and never speaks though can be seen singing along the others. She likes to play with baby ponies.
Morning Glory	Female	Turquoise	Yellow	Green vine with three purple Morning glory Flowers, one flower on her right cheek	1986 (Generation 1)	My Little Pony: The Movie (Debut); My Little Pony (TV series)	Russi Taylor
Morning Glory is a sweet and naive Flutter Pony, who helped Sting to fly as well to get Megan in the Human World by flying through the Rainbow. She spreads good luck. In the movie she appears to be very attached to Rosedust. Sometimes she is shown to be a bit shorter than other Flutter Ponies, indicating that she might not be fully-grown yet. She also wasn't strong enough to carry Megan on her back in 'The End of Flutter Valley', while Rosedust was able to do so in 'The Return of Tambelon'.
Peach Blossom	Female	Aqua	Turquoise	Seven pink and orange Peach flowers, one peach flower on her forehead	1986	My Little Pony: The Movie (Debut); My Little Pony (TV series)	B. J. Ward
Peach Blossom is a smart and logical Flutter Pony who is very proper and intelligent. She speaks in a way incomprehensible to most of the others. She uses her small size to her advantage, at one point acting as a spy. Peach Blossom gains an immense vocabulary in The Return of Tambelon. She can arrange stars on the sky.
Rosedust	Female	Yellow	Light Pink	Three pink roses and seven pink and green rosebuds, one rosebud on right cheek	1986	My Little Pony: The Movie (Debut); My Little Pony (TV series)	Russi Taylor
Rosedust first appeared in 1986 during the fourth year of the Generation 1 Toyline. Rosedust is the Queen and leader of the Flutter Ponies, who always speaks with an odd British accent. She usually wears a dark pink feather on her head. She was in charge of protecting the Sunstone, a giant magical jewel that allows Flutter Valley to flourish. She also tries to make peace between the ponies and with their enemies.

=== Seaponies/Baby Seaponies ===
The Seaponies are brightly colored seahorse-like creatures who dwell in the rivers and lakes of Dream Valley. They love underwater polo and can perform elaborate songs and dance numbers. They only appeared in the two Generation 1 Specials and they are based on the Hippocamp, a mythological creature shared by Phoenician and Greek mythology. A sub-line of the Seaponies called Baby Seaponies debuted later in 1985 and later in My Little Pony: The Movie.

Name	Gender	Body Color	Hair Color	Fin Color	Year of toy/Animation Debut	Animation Debut	Voiced by
Beachcomber	Female	Blue	Blue	Green	1985	My Little Pony (TV series)	N/A
Ripple	Female	White	Pink	Pink	1985	My Little Pony (TV series)	Nancy Cartwright
Ripple is a playful baby seapony who appeared in the original series. She's the fastest swimmer of all the baby Seaponies.
Sealight	Female	Lavender	Pink	Pink	1983	Rescue from Midnight Castle	Nancy Cartwright
Sealight is a playful Seapony, who alongside the other seaponies, saved Megan and Applejack from drowning. They gave Megan a shell that allow them to summon the Seaponies. She swims very gracefully.
Sea Shimmer	Female	Pale green-yellow	Blue	Blue	1985	My Little Pony (TV series)	Katie Leigh
Sea Shimmer is a playful baby seapony who appeared in the original series. Sea Shimmer is an expert water hockey player and loves to play with her friends.
Seawinkle	Female	Blue	Purple	Purple	1983	Rescue from Midnight Castle	Ivy Austin
Seawinkle is a playful Seapony, who alongside the other seaponies, saved Megan and Applejack from drowning. They gave Megan a shell that allow them to summon the Seaponies. She likes sailing.
Surf Rider	Female	Lavender	Pale Pink	Pale Pink	1985	My Little Pony (TV series)	Nancy Cartwright
Surf Rider is a playful baby seapony who appeared in the original series. Surf Rider's song can invoke sleep to anyone who hears her song. She loves to catch the tail of a big wave and ride it while it comes crashing down.
Sun Shower	Female	Yellow	Gold	Orange	1985	My Little Pony (TV series)	Jeannie Elias
Sun Shower is a playful baby seapony who appeared in the original series. Sun Shower cares about her appearance highly and is very vain sometimes.
Water Lily	Female	Pink	Green	Pink	1985	My Little Pony (TV series)	Katie Leigh
Water Lily is a playful baby seapony who appeared in the original series. Water Lily has the best voice of all the baby Seaponies and likes to dance.
Wavedancer	Female	Pink	Turquoise	Turquoise	1983	Rescue from Midnight Castle	Jeannie Elias
Wavedancer is a playful Seapony, who alongside the other seaponies, saved Megan and Applejack from drowning. They gave Megan a shell that allow them to summon the Seaponies. She likes to play in the clouds.

=== Princess Ponies ===
The Princess Ponies live near the Heart of Ponyland on a remote island, and use their wands to maintain the balance of Ponyland's magic. They each have a medallion symbol and wear a tall princess hat. They only appeared in The Quest of the Princess Ponies. Princess Tiffany is the best-known out of them.

Name	Gender	Race	Body Color	Hair Color	Cutie Mark	Year of toy/Animation Debut	Animation Debut	Voiced by
Princess Primrose	Female	Earth Pony	Pink	Blue with pink tinsel	Blue butterfly-shaped medallion with a red jewel	1986	My Little Pony (TV series)	Katie Leigh
One of the six Princess Ponies, Princess Primrose is one of the keepers of the Magic Wands which maintains the balance of Ponyland's magic, until it was stolen by Lavan, the Lava Demon. She usually has feuds with the other Princess Ponies on who should be queen, until they settled their differences and work together. Princess Primrose's wand is purple and allows her to manipulate the wind in any way she wishes. She also likes to play with butterflies.
Princess Royal Blue	Female	Earth Pony	Blue	Dark Pink with pink tinsel	Pink crescent moon-shaped medallion with a green jewel	1986	My Little Pony (TV series)	Sherry Lynn
One of the six Princess Ponies, Princess Royal Blue is one of the keepers of the Magic Wands which maintains the balance of Ponyland's magic, until it was stolen by Lavan, the Lava Demon. She usually has feuds with the other Princess Ponies on who should be queen, until they settled their differences and work together. Princess Royal Blue's wand is pinkish-purple and allows her to manipulate hail and snow. She is also a storyteller.
Princess Serena	Female	Earth Pony	Light Blue	Light Pink with gold tinsel	Pink heart-shaped medallion with a red jewel	1986	My Little Pony (TV series)	Jennifer Darling
Princess Serena is the Leader of the Princess Ponies and one of the keepers of the Magic Wands which maintains the balance of Ponyland's magic, until it was stolen by Lavan, the Lava Demon. She usually has feuds with the other Princess Ponies on who should be queen, until they settled their differences and work together. Princess Serena's wand is lavender and allows her to duplicate things. She often cheers up her friend when they are sad.
Princess Sparkle	Female	Unicorn	Lavender	Aqua with aqua tinsel	Gold flower-shaped medallion with a green jewel	1986	My Little Pony (TV series)	Alice Playten
One of the six Princess Ponies, Princess Sparkle is one of the keepers of the Magic Wands which maintains the balance of Ponyland's magic, until it was stolen by Lavan, the Lava Demon. She usually has feuds with the other Princess Ponies on who should be queen, until they settled their differences and work together. Princess Sparkle's wand is aqua and allows her to manipulate plants, and her horn can glow thus can be used as flashlight, but she was never seen winking in and out.
Princess Starburst	Female	Earth Pony	Yellow	Purple with silver tinsel	Pink star-shaped medallion with a yellow jewel	1985	My Little Pony (TV series)	Kath Soucie
One of the six Princess Ponies, Princess Starburst is one of the keepers of the Magic Wands which maintains the balance of Ponyland's magic, until it was stolen by Lavan, the Lava Demon. She usually has feuds with the other Princess Ponies on who should be queen, until they settled their differences and work together. Princess Starburst's wand is pink and allows her to change the colors around her. She likes sweet things, especially chocolate ones.
Princess Tiffany	Female	Pegasus	White	White with silver tinsel	Silver teardrop-shaped medallion with a green jewel	1986	My Little Pony (TV series)	Kath Soucie
Princess Tiffany is the pegasus Princess Pony. Alongside the other Princess Ponies, Princess Tiffany lives near the Heart of Ponyland on a remote island. They use their wands to maintain the balance of Ponyland's magic, until it was stolen by Lavan, the Lava Demon, forcing her to get Megan in Dream Valley to stand up against him. She usually has feuds with the other Princess Ponies on who should be queen, until they settled their differences and work together. Princess Tiffany's wand is blue and allows her to drive away the clouds. She cares a lot for her appearance.

=== Big Brother Ponies ===
The Big Brother Ponies were the only males in Dream Valley, and are all earth ponies. They return from a year-long race around the world at the beginning of Somnambula. They have hairy hooves (like Shires) and wear bandanas. Oddly enough, Quarterback is referred to as Score. Except for Knight Shade, they are the only male ponies to appear in series.

Name	Gender	Bandana Color	Body Color	Hair Color	Cutie Mark	Year of toy/Animation Debut	Animation Debut	Voiced by
4-Speed	Male	Pink	Pale blue	Dark blue with light pink streak in mane	Pink and purple truck	1986	My Little Pony (TV series)	Charlie Adler
4-Speed is one of the Big Brother ponies, who returned to Dream Valley after a year-long race around the world at the beginning of Somnambula. He is an expert driver.
Quarterback/Score	Male	Pink	Blue	Blue with a White Streak in mane	Pink and white American football	1986	My Little Pony (TV series)	Charlie Adler
Quarterback is one of the Big Brother ponies, who returned to Dream Valley after a year-long race around the world at the beginning of Somnambula. He is the leader of the group and also an expert football player.
Salty	Male	Green	Turquoise	Purple with a Pink Streak in mane	Pink and white boat	1986	My Little Pony (TV series)	Charlie Adler
Salty is one of the Big Brother ponies, who returned to Dream Valley after a year-long race around the world at the beginning of Somnambula. He has a sailor accent and wants a boat more than anything else.
Slugger	Male	Blue	Pink-purple	White with a Pink Streak in mane	Turquoise glove with baseball and bat	1986	My Little Pony (TV series)	Rob Paulsen
Slugger is one of the Big Brother ponies, who returned to Dream Valley after a year-long race around the world at the beginning of Somnambula. Slugger is a huge fan of baseball and is also madly in love with Buttons, though she didn't seem to feel the same for him, as she hasn't said a single word about him while preparing welcome party. The two were later shown together at the end of episode, but for the rest of the series Buttons doesn't mention Slugger whatsoever.
Steamer	Male	Yellow	Pink	Light pink with green streak in mane	Purple and yellow train	1986	My Little Pony (TV series)	Rob Paulsen
Steamer is one of the Big Brother ponies, who returned to Dream Valley after a year-long race around the world at the beginning of Somnambula. He's a train specialist and dreams on owning his very own train and railway.
Tex	Male	Blue	Yellow	Pink with blue streak in mane	Two green cacti and two pink sagebrushes	1986	My Little Pony (TV series)	Rob Paulsen
Tex is one of the Big Brother ponies, who returned to Dream Valley after a year-long race around the world at the beginning of Somnambula. He has a strong Southern American accent and wants to be a real life cowboy.

=== Baby Ponies ===
The Baby Ponies were ponies who were born from the reflections of their mothers. However several Baby Ponies never had their own mothers and had a lot of minor roles in several My Little Pony episodes.

Name	Gender	Race	Body Color	Hair Color	Cutie Mark	Year of toy/Animation Debut	Animation Debut	Voiced by
Baby Bouncy	Female	Pegasus	Yellow	Blue	Blue, yellow and pink beachball	1985	My Little Pony (TV series)	Russi Taylor
Baby Bouncy is one of the first tooth ponies, in charge of taking care of the twins Baby Snookums and Sniffles and Baby Milkweed and Tumbleweed. She alongside the other baby ponies has one tooth and was involved in a feud against Fudgey McSwain and Rocky Ripple. She likes doing tricks on ball and dance in clouds. Despite being younger than Baby Lofty she flies well.
Baby Cuddles	Female	Earth Pony	Turquoise	Pink	Pink rattle	1984	My Little Pony (TV series)	Nancy Cartwright
Baby Cuddles is one of the baby ponies in Paradise Estates. She doesn't have a mother but she is adorable and brave like the adults. She also loves her baby buggy.
Baby Fifi	Female	Earth Pony	Blue	White with a pink streak in mane	Two pink poodles	1986 (As a So-Soft Unicorn Pony)	My Little Pony (TV series)	Jeannie Elias
Baby Fifi is one of the first tooth ponies, in charge of taking care of the twins Baby Snookums and Sniffles and Baby Milkweed and Tumbleweed. Unlike her mother, who was a Unicorn, Baby Fifi is born as an Earth Pony and speaks with a French accent. Alongside the other baby ponies, she has one tooth and they were involved in a feud against Fudgey McSwain and Rocky Ripple. She likes wooly sweaters and playing in the winter.
Baby Half Note	Female	Earth Pony	Lavender	Turquoise	Pair of lavender ballet slippers tied with a pink ribbon	1985	My Little Pony (TV series)	Sherry Lynn
Baby Half-Note is one of the baby ponies in Paradise Estates. She doesn't have a mother but she loves to dance gracefully though sometimes falls. Her dream is being a famous dancer. She is also a good singer, as shown in 'Bright Lights'.
Milkweed	Female	Earth Pony	Yellow	Pink	Pink rocking horse with blue hair	1987	My Little Pony (TV series)	Katie Leigh
Milkweed is Tumbleweed's twin sister. Both classified as identical twins, they both don't have a mother, but like to cause trouble to Baby North Star and the gang. Their favorite nursery toys are twin pink rocking horses with bright blue ribbons for reins. While playing she pretends to chase outlaws on her rocking horse.
Baby Quackers	Female	Earth Pony	White	Blue, green, yellow and dark pink	Yellow duck carrying orange umbrella	1987	My Little Pony (TV series)	Robbie Lee
Baby Quackers is one of the first tooth ponies, in charge of taking care of the twins Baby Snookums and Sniffles and Baby Milkweed and Tumbleweed. She alongside the other baby ponies has one tooth and were involved in a feud against Fudgey McSwain and Rocky Ripple. She usually make duck noises while she speaks. Because of this she can pretend being a duck.
Baby Sleepy Pie	Female	Earth Pony	White	Blue	Pink teddy bear wearing a night cap	1986	My Little Pony (TV series)	N/A
Baby Sleepy Pie is a baby Earth Pony who has a non-speaking role in 'Somnambula' (despite that has one of major roles) and a cameo in 'Baby, It's Cold Outside'. She doesn't have a mother.
Sniffles	Female (Male in UK)	Earth Pony (toy is Unicorn)	Lavender	Light Pink	Light Pink Mittens	1987	My Little Pony (TV series)	Katie Lee
Sniffles is Snookums's twin sister. Both classified as fraternal newborn twins, they both don't have a mother, but like to cause trouble to Baby North Star and the gang. Both love winter. Eagerly, they watch as the white flakes cover the hills and ice sparkles on the pond. They slip on the pretty mittens that their Mama knitted for them to keep their little hands warm in the winter cold. Sniffles likes going skating.
Snookums	Female	Earth Pony (toy is Unicorn)	Light Pink	Lavender	Lavender Mittens	1987	My Little Pony (TV series)	Katie Lee
Snookums is Sniffles's twin sister. Both classified as fraternal newborn twins, they both don't have a mother, but like to cause trouble to Baby North Star and the gang. Both love winter. Eagerly, they watch as the white flakes cover the hills and ice sparkles on the pond. They slip on the pretty mittens that their Mama knitted for them to keep their little hands warm in the winter cold. Snookums likes going sledding.
Baby Tic Tac Toe	Female	Earth Pony	Lemon Yellow	Red, dark pink, dark green and green	Green and pink noughts and crosses board	1987	My Little Pony (TV series)	Alice Playten
Baby Tic Tac Toe is one of the first tooth ponies, in charge of taking care of the twins Snookums and Sniffles and Milkweed and Tumbleweed. She alongside the other baby ponies has one tooth and was involved in a feud against Fudgey McSwain and Rocky Ripple. In episode 'The Prince and the Ponies' she seems to be a leader to the first tooth ponies.
Baby Tiddley-Winks	Female	Earth Pony	Pink	Light pink	White bib with blue heart design	1986	My Little Pony (TV series)	Katie Leigh
Baby Tiddley-Winks is one of the baby ponies in Paradise Estates. She doesn't have a mother. She has main role in the episode 'Pony Puppy' where she encounters Dynah along with Baby Lickety-Split and Baby Shady. Of all ponies she cares about the giant dog the most. She likes playing both outside and inside.
Tumbleweed	Female	Earth Pony	Yellow	Pink	Pink Rocking horse with blue hair	1987	My Little Pony (TV series)	Katie Leigh
Tumbleweed is Milkweed's twin sister. Both classified as identical twins, they both don't have a mother, but like to cause trouble to Baby North Star and the gang. Their favorite nursery toys are twin pink rocking horses with bright blue ribbons for reins. While playing she imagines she is riding a musical carousel in the park.

=== Special Episode Ponies ===
These characters appeared only in 'Rescue from Midnight Castle' and 'Escape from Catrina'. They never appeared in series. Some of them have ruffled hair and horseshoes.

Name	Gender	Race	Body Color	Hair Color	Cutie Mark	Year of toy/Animation Debut	Animation Debut	Voiced by
Applejack	Female	Earth Pony	Orange	Yellow	Seven orange-red apples with green leaves	1983	Rescue from Midnight Castle	Sandy Duncan
Applejack is a silly pony who always ends up knocking over fences and looking over her shoulder to see where she has been. She loves apples and is frequently found in the Apple Orchard. In her first appearance ('Rescue from Midnight Castle'), she was one of four ponies to be corrupted by Tirek's Rainbow of Darkness in order to pull his chariot. She was reverted to normal after Tirek was destroyed. Applejack is the only character in the whole toy line to retain her appearance throughout generations (excluding Generation 3). She then appeared again in My Little Pony: Friendship is Magic, using her updated Generation 1 Appearance instead of the Generation 3 one.
Bow Tie	Female	Earth Pony	Blue	Pink	Six pink bows	1983	Rescue from Midnight Castle	Laura Dean
Bow Tie currently holds the record on having the most variants of her ever created and released in each part of the world. She is described to be an earth pony in the special and is also involved during Scorpan's raid in Dream Valley. She loves ribbons, ribbons tied in bows and on packages, silky ribbons, satin ribbons and ribbons every colour of the rainbow. She especially likes to have her hair braided with ribbon, with an extra ribbon tied in a bow at the end. Bow Tie appeared again in the Generation 3 line as one of the Dazzle Bright Ponies.
Bubbles	Female	Earth Pony	Yellow	Blue	Four blue and five green bubbles	1983	Rescue from Midnight Castle	N/A
Bubbles is a shy pony who loves to play in the muddy field and roll about covering herself in goo. But bath time is also a favorite time as she chases bubbles on the wind. In 'Rescue from Midnight Castle', she was one of four ponies to be corrupted by Tirek's Rainbow of Darkness in order to pull his chariot. She was reverted to normal after Tirek was destroyed.
Cotton Candy/Baby Cotton Candy	Female	Earth Pony	Light Pink	Pink	Forty white spots (Cotton Candy)/Nine white dots (Baby Cotton Candy)	1983	Rescue From Midnight Castle (Original Release); Escape From Catrina (Baby Cotton Candy's debut)	Laura Dean (Cotton Candy); Katie Leigh (As Baby Cotton Candy)
Cotton Candy is a sweet-lover, who loves sweet things: sweet nectar from the flowers, sweet honey from the bees, and sweet grass from the valley. However, she is also a bit lazy and tries to find her treats a little too close to home. Blossom's flower garden is always a tempting place to grab a snack. In 'Rescue from Midnight Castle', she was one of four ponies to be corrupted by Tirek's Rainbow of Darkness in order to pull his chariot. She was reverted to normal after Tirek was destroyed. Her daughter is Baby Cotton Candy who is very playful. She was again re-released as part of the Generation 3 line, with a significantly altered appearance.
Ember	Female	Earth Pony	Lilac (Ember's Dream)/Pink; Blue; Lavender (other versions)	Violet (Ember's Dream)/Purple; Blue; Pink (other versions)	White Star ("Ember's Dream" Listen n' Fun set version)/None (other versions)	1984	Rescue from Midnight Castle	Lynne Lipton
Ember is the very first baby earth pony to be made and be available via mail order. She then appeared again in the first My Little Pony special "Rescue from Midnight Castle". In the special, she is the only pony to have no cutie mark of her own but doesn't seem to care about it.
Firefly/Baby Firefly	Female	Pegasus	Pink	Blue	Two glittery blue lightning bolts (Firefly)/Blue glittery lightning bolt (Baby Firefly)	1983	Rescue From Midnight Castle	Sandy Duncan
Firefly is a daredevil and one of the most famous characters in the history of My Little Pony due to her heavy inclusion in pony movies and comics. She loves to race across the sky, moving gracefully from cloud to cloud, she dances on her graceful hooves and sails on the wind. She often chases the rain and searches among the clouds for the pony's special friend, the rainbow. She has daughter named Baby Firefly, who appears just in tales and wants to be like her mother. Lauren Faust stated that her personality is the basis for the Friendship is Magic incarnation of Rainbow Dash.
Glory/Baby Glory	Female	Unicorn	White	Purple with a Blue Streak in mane	Glittery silver shooting star with two purple tails (Glory)/Glittery purple shooting star with one tail (Baby Glory)	1983	Rescue From Midnight Castle (Glory); Escape from Catrina (Baby Glory)	Fran Brill (As Glory); Katie Leigh (As Baby Glory)
Glory is described to be the most elegant of all the Unicorn Ponies and moves from place to place with a magical stride, almost as though she had wings. Her magic takes her from kingdom to kingdom in search of a young girl who believes in magic and in unicorns. She also likes jumping and rollerblading and has a daughter named Baby Glory, who is described to be brave. Glory is the inspiration for the Friendship is Magic incarnation of Rarity, alongside Sparkler and Majesty. Both Glory and Baby Glory have not demonstrated any magical ability with their horns.
Medley	Female	Pegasus	Turquoise	Green	Group of five dark green glittery music notes	1983	Rescue From Midnight Castle	Sandy Duncan
Medley is a Pegasus Pony who accompanies Firefly. Unlike Firefly, Medley is calmer than her counterpart.
Moondancer/Baby Moondancer	Female	Unicorn	White	Red with Purple Streak in mane (Moondancer)/Pink with purple streak in mane (Baby Moondancer)	Glittery silver moon surrounded by eight red stars (Moondancer)/Glittery pink crescent moon and two stars (Baby Moondancer)	1983	Rescue From Midnight Castle (Moondancer); Escape From Catrina (Baby Moondancer)	Laura Dean (As Moondancer); Alice Playten (As Baby Moondancer)
Moondancer is a Unicorn Pony who debuted in 1983 as part of the Second wave of the Generation 1 Toyline. Moondancer then made her brief appearance in the first My Little Pony Special Rescue From Midnight Castle. Moondancer is one of the four kidnapped ponies in Dream Valley during Scorpan's raid. Out of the four, she is the only Unicorn Pony that was corrupted by Tirek's Rainbow of Darkness in order to pull his chariot. She was reverted to normal after Tirek was destroyed. She has a daughter named Baby Moondancer, who likes to dance but is very shy. She got kidnapped by Catrina along with the Rainbow of Light to be used as a ransom to force the Bushwoolies to go back to her. Both Moondancer and Baby Moondancer have not demonstrated any magical ability with their horns. According to Lauren Faust, Moondancer was meant to be a main character for My Little Pony: Friendship is Magic. However, due to the loss of almost all of the Generation 1 Names, she was revamped and remade into Twilight Sparkle. She is mentioned in the first episode of the series and is featured in the fifth-season episode "Amending Fences."
Skydancer	Female	Pegasus	Yellow	Dark pink, light yellow, green and blue	Seven glittery green birds	1984	Escape From Catrina	Jeannie Elias
Skydancer is a Pegasus Pony who carries Megan as she took her to Dream Valley for the second time. She also loves to fly very fast and dance to the sound of the wind, especially when it flows through the clouds like the music of string harps. Skydancer is one of two Rainbow Pony who was released as a toy alongside Starflower.
Sparkler	Female	Unicorn	Pale Blue	Purple with a Red Streak in mane	Ten blue glittery diamonds	1984	Escape From Catrina	Ivy Austin
Sparkler is a unicorn pony, who is present in the opening sequence of Escape From Catrina, painting the welcome sign for Megan's return and also during the end of the special, wearing a cheerleader outfit and likes to dance. Sparkler loves shiny, sparkling objects and collects them. She has not demonstrated any magical ability with her horn. Sparkler is one of the inspirations for the Friendship is Magic incarnation of Rarity, alongside Glory and Majesty.
Twilight	Female	Unicorn	Pink	White with a Purple Streak in mane	Nine glittery purple stars	1983	Rescue from Midnight Castle	Laura Dean
Twilight is shown to have a special ability to teleport by wishing herself. She also likes to gaze to the stars. In the comics, she was a mysterious little pony who would occasionally appear to grant wishes after dark surrounded by a strange mist. Twilight is the inspiration for the main protagonist of My Little Pony: Friendship is Magic, Twilight Sparkle.
Powder	Female	Unicorn	Purple	White with red streak in mane	Five glittery white snowflakes	1984	Escape From Catrina	Jeannie Elias
Powder is a unicorn pony, who loves to play in snow and is present in the opening sequence of Escape From Catrina, giving Megan rainbow medallion. She has not demonstrated any magical ability with her horn.
Starflower	Female	Unicorn	Blue	Coral, pink, aqua and neon yellow	Six glittery dark pink stars	1984	Escape From Catrina	Alice Playten
Starflower is a unicorn pony, who loves rainbows and is present in the opening sequence of Escape From Catrina, doing decorations for Megan's return. She has not demonstrated any magical ability with her horn. Starflower is one of the two Rainbow Ponies who was released as a toy alongside Skydancer.
Majesty	Female	Unicorn	White	Blue with silver streak in mane	Five glittery blue flowers	1984	The Magic Nut Tree, The Trolls and the Castle of Darkness, The Cross Weather Witch, A Shock at The Stable Show	N/A
Majesty is a unicorn pony, who appears only in the 4 UK My Little Pony Books: The Magic Nut Tree, The Trolls and the Castle of Darkness, The Cross Weather Witch and A Shock at The Stable Show, as well as the UK comics. She is one of the most magical ponies, lives in the Dream Castle with her dragon assistant Spike, and lowers the drawbridge when friends drop round for tea. She can makes wishes come true when she twirls her magic horn. However, when necessary to protect her subjects, she has punished enemies with fates such as being turned to stone. Majesty is one of the inspirations for the Friendship is Magic incarnation of Rarity, alongside Glory and Sparkler.

== Villains ==
Name	Species	Gender	Body color	Hair color	Year of toy/animation debut	Animation debut	Voiced by
Erebus	Cloud Demon	Male	Gray	N/A	1986	My Little Pony (TV series)	Unknown
Erebus is a malevolent Cloud Demon whose intention is to devour everyone's shadows to give him strength. He met Knight Shade in the village grayvale one day, and promised he will boost his career and make him a star. Erebus indeed drew almost the entire village to Knight Shade's next concert, stealing all their shadows, including that of Knight Shade's mother, and used them to turn himself into a powerful cloud of magic. Since then, Knight Shade has toured to increasing success, stealing ever more shadows for Erebus, hoping to keep his own shadow long enough to figure out a way to stop Erebus. While hunting for shadows, Erebus calls to Megan to come out of hiding, and she steps up, announcing that she has a surprise for him. A vast army of Flutter Ponies, brought by Molly and Lofty, fills the skies, circling Erebus and blasting him with their Utter Flutter. Unable to withstand the onslaught, Erebus grows smaller and smaller, and the shadows he contains fly out, seeking their original owners, both he and Zeb were placed in prison.
Bray	Donkey	Male	Brown	N/A	1986	My Little Pony (TV series)	Frank Welker
Bray is a sneering donkey, who first appeared delivering the unicorns their disgusting meal and then reports to Grogar, the Ruler of Tambelon Megan has seen in her dreams. He is always loyal to Grogar but sometimes getting scolded by him when he makes mistakes.
Catrina	Humanoid Feline Witch	Female	Dark Brown	Orange	1985	Escape from Catrina	Tammy Grimes
Catrina is a Humanoid Feline Witch. Catrina herself is a powerful witch who is dependent upon the Witchweed potion, which is the source of her power. She holds the Bushwoolies her slaves and forces them to make the potion for her. After the Bushwoolies escape, she attempted on kidnapping the ponies to be her new slaves, but she is thwarted by the Rainbow of Light. She ends up kidnapping Baby Moondancer and the Rainbow of Light to force the ponies to be her new slaves. She was defeated by Rep and later redeemed herself of her bad ways by destroying the machine that produces the Witchweed Potion.
Draggle	Witch	Female	None	Orange	1986	My Little Pony: The Movie; My Little Pony (TV series)	Madeline Kahn (movie); Jennifer Darling (series)
Draggle is one of Hydia's two daughters. She is slimmer and taller than Reeka and struggles to do magic, and is thus seen as an embarrassment to the family.
Grogar	Ram	Male	Ash Gray	N/A	1986	My Little Pony (TV series)	Michael Bell
Grogar is an evil ram and the leader of Tambelon, who once ruled Ponyland with an iron fist 500 years ago before he was defeated when the ancient bell was rung, banishing him and the city to the Shadow World. He then returned to Ponyland 500 years later, capturing all the Unicorn Ponies one by one and plans to capture everyone in Dream Valley to be banished to the Shadow World. He has a cold and antagonistic personality, always scolding Bray for his mistakes and sometimes abuses the Troggles so they can follow his orders and do what he wants. Grogar's powers comes from the bells on his neck, and he has superior magic skills even far beyond any Unicorn Pony ever existed. Grogar was defeated again by Megan after she rang the ancient bell for the second time, banishing him and the whole city back to the Shadow World.
Hydia	Witch	Female	None	Gray	1986	My Little Pony: The Movie; My Little Pony (TV series)	Cloris Leachman (movie); Tress MacNeille (series)
Hydia a powerful witch. She lives in the Volcano of Gloom alongside her daughters Reeka and Draggle and despises anything that is nice, pretty and beautiful and instead wants to make everything gloomy and dreary to suit her taste on living. She unleashes the Smooze, unstoppable purple ooze that will eat and destroy everything in its path. Also is making anyone who is splashed by it grumpy and woeful. She and her daughters were defeated twice by Megan and the Ponies.
Lavan	Lava Demon	Male	Red (Lava form); White and Blue (Crystal form)	None	1987	My Little Pony (TV series)	Unknown
Lavan is a malevolent lava demon who kidnaps the Princess Ponies and steal their magic wands since they contain all the magic in ponyland. He uses them to transform himself into an all-powerful crystal being but then was eventually destroyed by the Princess Ponies who used their magic through working together.
Queen Bumble	Bee	Female	Yellow and Black	Orange	1986	My Little Pony (TV series)	Unknown
Queen Bumble is the ruler of Bumbleland, a place located somewhere nearby Flutter Valley in which all the bees live after their exile. She usually has a cold personality and hated the Flutter Ponies for dumping her and her people in the freezing land and decided to work with Hydia to steal the Sunstone and use its power to direct the sun to allow plants and flowers to grow in Bumbleland, also slowly destroying Flutter Valley in the process. But she didn't know that the Sunstone can destroy her land due to too much heat, causing a fire that would burn everything in its path. In the end, she and the bees tried to reclaim the Sunstone from the Flutter Ponies, but Sting tries to stop Bumble. Rosedust intervenes and offers that if Bumble leaves the Flutter Ponies alone, she can come to Flutter Valley and take flowers anytime. She agrees, and Sting returns to Bumbleland with her and the other bees.
Princess Porcina	Pig	Female	Pink	Amber	1986	My Little Pony (TV series)	Tress MacNeille
Porcina is a pig princess that uses magic. She needs material to replace her magic cloak, which is all but worn out - she uses its magic to turn things into glass, as she's obsessed with her own reflection. The Raptorians work for her with the promise that they'll soon receive their own kingdom. Porcina deems the washing to be useless and tells the Raptorians to find something better. They capture Gusty, Heart Throb, and Lickety-Split in hope to use their hair to make her cloak. Porcina receives her new cloak, and happily turns the Paradise Estate and every other non-living thing in Ponyland to glass, much to the Little Ponies' horror. The chief Raptorian praises her efforts, but suggests that it might be even better if every creature in Ponyland also bore her reflection. She agrees, and casts a second spell, turning every Little Pony in the Paradise Estate to glass. Shady, Molly, Megan, North Star, Paradise, Magic Star, and the Bushwoolies made a fake cloak in hopes of pulling off a switch with the real one only for the Raptorians to catch onto them. Porcina starts the spell to turn the Ponies into glass, but confronting them face to face makes her realize she has no right. The chief Raptorian snatches her cloak and tries the spell himself, but finds he's holding the fake. A tug-of-war ensues over the real cloak, and it tears in half, releasing a bolt of energy that hits the Raptorians and turns them all into glass. Regretting her selfish actions, Porcina uses the remains of the cloak to restore the Little Ponies and everything else in Ponyland. The Bushwoolies destroy the cloak, then offer to take Porcina on as their groomer, and she agrees.
Raptorians	Raptorians (wolf/bird hybrid)	Male	Red (Shrock); Orange (long-eared raptorian); Yellow (sheepdog raptorian)	Red (Shrock); Brown (long pigtail-like eared raptorian); Blonde (sheepdog raptorian)	1986	My Little Pony (TV series)	Charlie Adler
The Raptorians are creatures with wolflike heads and birdlike bodies. They are showing an unusual interest in a washing line, using a magic mirror to show it to their mistress, a magic pig named Porcina. The Raptorians work for her with the promise that they'll soon receive their own kingdom. They capture Gusty, Lickety-Split, and Heart Throb in hopes to make a new cloak from their hair. The Raptorians leave the Ponies almost bald, but their hair instantly grows back to its original length. Delighted, the Raptorians set the Ponies to work weaving their own hair into a new cloak for Porcina. After Porcina turns Ponyland into glass, the Raptorians are delighted that they won't have to put up with her any longer. They later caught Megan and the ponies trying to switch cloaks. Porcina starts the spell to turn the Ponies into glass, but confronting them face to face makes her realize she has no right. The chief Raptorian snatches her cloak and tries the spell himself, but finds he's holding the fake. A tug-of-war ensues over the real cloak, and it tears in half, releasing a bolt of energy that hits the Raptorians and turns them all into glass.
Reeka	Witch	Female	None	Black	1986	My Little Pony: The Movie; My Little Pony (TV series)	Rhea Perlman (movie); Jennifer Darling (series)
Reeka is one of Hydia's two daughters. She is fatter and shorter than Draggle and only thinks of food rather than magic.
Rep	Shape Shifting Lizard	Male	Brown	None	1985	Escape from Catrina	Paul Williams
Rep is a Shape Shifting Lizard and Catrina's assistant. He can turn himself into any form he wishes and even use it as a disguise to blend in. Unlike Catrina, he understands the Bushwoolies, who were being fed up with Catrina's orders and tries to convince them to stay. He later on helped Megan and the ponies defeat Catrina and later redeemed themselves in the end.
Scorpan	Demon (Corrupted form); Human (Purified form)	Male	Ash Brown	None	1984	Rescue from Midnight Castle	Ron Taylor
Scorpan is a demon gargoyle (originally a human being). As Spike mentioned in the special, Scorpan was once a human prince before Tirac destroyed his kingdom and corrupted him using the Rainbow of Darkness, turning him into his demonic form. Despite his appearance, he shows sympathy to the ponies who were being turned into evil dragons. It was shown the reason why he helped Tirac kidnap ponies was because Tirac threatened to harm Spike if he didn't. During the finale of the special, he was turned back into his human form.
Somnambula	Human Witch	Female	None	Black (young form); Grey (old form)	1987	My Little Pony (TV series)	Unknown
Somnambula is a witch whose powers are stronger when she is younger. She has a canary named Kyrie whom she holds prisoner. She makes Kyrie sing to attract the ponies in a trance. As soon as Somnambula was younger she creates a magical circus and leads the ponies to it. She takes away the youth of the earth and pegasus ponies to make her younger and the youth of the unicorn ponies to make her powers stronger and stores them in a crystal. She also created illusions of the Big Brother Ponies' fantasies to keep them distracted. Kyrie aids the Baby Ponies and Spike in rescuing the other ponies. Seeing Buttons in agony, Slugger destroys the crystal causing Somnambula to rapidly age back to an old woman. The circus disappears and the ponies regain their youth.
Tirac	Centaur	Male	Dark Gray	None	1984	Rescue from Midnight Castle	Victor Caroli
Tirac is a centaur wizard with elements of a demon (mainly Baphomet). He resides in the forbidden Midnight Castle alongside his minions and his loyal servant Scorpan, who he orders to kidnap the ponies of Dream Valley to execute his evil scheme. Tirac wields the Rainbow of Darkness, a powerful sack containing evil magic which corrupts everything it touches.It can even turn the ponies he captured into evil dragons which were used to pull his "Chariot of Darkness" and execute the event called the "Night that Never Ends", on which he will use the Rainbow of Darkness to corrupt Dream Valley and plunge it into chaos. When Tirac takes off in his Chariot of Darkness, Megan grabs the satchel containing the rainbow of darkness, but can't hold on to it. As he was about to release the Rainbow of Darkness, Megan opens the locket to reveal the Rainbow of Light. But it is only a small piece that is soon enveloped in darkness. But the Rainbow of Light starts fighting back, and eventually overpowers the Rainbow of Darkness. He was destroyed by the Rainbow of Light, freeing Scorpan from his spell and turning him back into his human form.
Zeb	Zebra	Male	Black and White	N/A	1986	My Little Pony (TV series)	Unknown
Zeb is a greedy zebra and the manager of Knight Shade, who is working with Erebus, he employs giant rats to do his dirty work. He usually collect shadows using a strange machine and collects them in his satchel. The Flutter Ponies help the Little Ponies by getting Erebus to chase them, overexerting himself until he used up all his energy. As Zeb tries to recapture the shadows, an army of Greyvaleans surrounds him, placing him in shackles.
Dragon Gang	Dragons	Male	Green	None	1986	My Little Pony (TV series)	Unknown
The Dragon Gang are three unnamed dragons who appeared as the main antagonists of "Spike's Search" - an episode from the original My Little Pony series. Spike, being a baby dragon, was becoming worried with his inability to control his fire breathe, so he set out to find a dragon to teach him how to control his powers. Unfortunately, he came across a gang of particularly brutish dragons, complete with a leader who fancied himself a king (wearing a crown). The Dragon Gang were rude and unwelcoming to Spike, but their leader decided to allow Spike to come with them to see what being a dragon was about. However, to Spike's dismay, the Dragon Gang raided a nearby village, terrorizing the villagers and stealing their food. The Dragon Gang proceeded to leave the still-burning village and laughed despite Spike saying what they were doing was wrong. Spike suggested that the Dragon Gang be more like the Little Ponies, which sparked the Dragon Gang's interest, and they had Spike take them to the Little Ponies, though they were secretly planning on robbing the Ponies and were simply using Spike. However the Ponies were aware of what was happening and arranged a feast for the Dragon Gang, who greedily took the food and began to bully the Ponies, causing Spike to stand up to them, yet they refused to leave, and so the Ponies let loose a trap they had set specifically for the troublesome dragons. Using a nearby waterfall they drenched the dragons, who hated being wet and fled the scene, complaining that they were only "having fun". Spike decides he is better off without the Dragon Gang and says he wanted to learn how to be a dragon and not a bully.

== See also ==
- List of My Little Pony characters
