= List of My Little Pony home video releases =

This article lists home video releases of the original My Little Pony "Generation One" cartoons produced by Sunbow Entertainment. These include the 1984 special My Little Pony, usually released as Rescue from Midnight Castle; the 1985 special Escape from Catrina; My Little Pony: The Movie, released 1986; and My Little Pony portion of My Little Pony 'n Friends anthology series broadcast 1986–1988.

== North America (Region 1) ==
All episodes of My Little Pony were originally released by Kid Rhino Entertainment (a subsidiary of AOL Time Warner, formerly part of and formerly distributed by Warner Family Entertainment and part of WEA) in North America between 2004-2006. These DVDs are encoded for Region 1 in NTSC format. As of 2012, My Little Pony: The Movie is available on North American DVD. These releases have been discontinued and are now out of print.

The first series and the two previous specials are available in My Little Pony: The Complete First Season, a four-disc box set.

My Little Pony: The Complete First Season
Disc 1	Disc 2	Disc 3	Disc 4
The End of Flutter Valley; The Ghost of Paradise Estate	The Great Rainbow Caper; The Glass Princess; Pony Puppy; Bright Lights; Sweet Stuff and the Treasure Hunt	The Return of Tambelon; Little Piece of Magic; The Magic Coins; Mish Mash Melee; Woe Is Me; Fugitive Flowers; Would Be Dragonslayer	Baby, It's Cold Outside; Crunch the Rockdog; The Revolt of Paradise Estate; Through the Door; Rescue from Midnight Castle; Escape from Catrina

These episodes were supposed to be uncut, but however, these are the versions repeated on The Disney Channel’s unnamed pre-Playhouse Disney-era pre-school programming block, with several differences from the original transmission:

- All cliffhangers have been edited (except the one from The Revolt of Paradise Estate Part 1) and narrated recaps removed.
- Rescue from Midnight Castle and Escape from Catrina are the two-part versions, with songs removed and other changes.
- The Glass Princess Part 4 has its song removed and has been noticeably slowed down.
- Mish Mash Melee is not listed on the Disc 3 case and is therefore hidden on Disc 3.
- Credits vary between those used on original transmission and those used for VHS releases.

The second series is available in two volumes, and are also sourced from the Disney Channel repeats.

My Little Pony Second Season DVDs
The Quest of the Princess Ponies and Other Stories	Flight to Cloud Castle and Other Stories
The Quest of the Princess Ponies; The Golden Horseshoes	Flight to Cloud Castle; Somnambula; Spike's Search; The Ice Cream Wars; The Prince and the Ponies

- The End of Flutter Valley is also available on a separate DVD.
- The Glass Princess and The Magic Coins are also available on a DVD called Two Great Pony Tales.
- Pony Puppy, Bright Lights, Sweet Stuff and the Treasure Hunt, and Baby, It's Cold Outside are also available on Pony Puppy and Other Stories.

On June 9, 2014, it was announced that Shout! Factory had acquired the rights to the series and released My Little Pony – The Complete Series on DVD on September 30, 2014. The four-disc set contains all 65 episodes of the series spanning from the first to the third seasons. As with the Rhino releases however, the episodes are once again based on the Disney Channel repeats, with the two specials again being the two-part episode versions.

== Australia ==
12 My Little Pony DVDs have released in Australia by MRA Entertainment, including all episodes (in random order) and the movie. They have no region encoding, and are presented in PAL format.

1. My Little Pony: The Movie
2. The End Of Flutter Valley
3. The Ghost of Paradise Estate & Fugitive Flowers
4. Bright Lights & Crunch the Rockdog
5. The Magic Coins and The Revolt of Paradise Estate
6. Woe Is Me & Little Piece of Magic & Flight to Cloud Castle
7. Through the Door & Sweet Stuff and the Treasure Hunt & Pony Puppy & Would Be Dragonslayer
8. The Quest of the Princess Ponies & Baby, It's Cold Outside
9. Spike's Search & Somnambula & The Golden Horseshoes
10. The Ice Cream Wars & Mish Mash Melee & The Return of Tambelon
11. The Prince and the Ponies & Rescue from Midnight Castle & Escape from Catrina.
12. The Glass Princess & The Great Rainbow Caper
- These episodes are sourced from the 1980s Australian transmissions. All cliffhangers and narrated recaps are intact, but most episodes lack end credits.
- Rescue from Midnight Castle and Escape from Catrina are the two-part versions, with songs removed and other changes.
- The Glass Princess 4 is edited, with its song removed.
- Selecting an individual episode of Somnambula or The Golden Horseshoes from the menu gives an easter egg featuring Baby Ribbon.
- Two box sets have been released. Each collecting three of the DVDs

=== MiniDVDs ===
Three My Little Pony titles have been released on MiniDVD in Australia.

1. The Ghost of Paradise Estate
2. Bright Lights
3. The Magic Coins

== UK (Region 2) ==
A few volumes have been released in the UK by Metrodome Distribution Limited. They are encoded for Region 2 in PAL format.

- My Little Pony: The Movie
- The End of Flutter Valley
- The Magic Coins & Bright Lights
- The Glass Princess & The Quest of the Princess Ponies
- The Quest for the golden horseshoes & seven other stories
- Pony Puppy and three other stories

Some My Little Pony episodes are available on the 'Girl's World' compilation DVDs released by Metrodome Distribution Limited.

- Girl's World contains episodes of My Little Pony Tales (but labeled as My Little Pony), Little Ghosts, Jem, MoonDreamers and Pongwiffy.
- Girl's World 2 includes Fugitive Flowers, with episodes of My Little Pony Tales, The Charmkins, Jem, and MoonDreamers.

== Belgium & The Netherlands (Region 2, Dutch language) ==
My Little Pony: De Speelfilm (The Dutch translation of The Movie) has been released by both The Sales Company and Video/Film Express.

A series of DVDs is available in Belgium and the Netherlands, including all episodes in the Dutch language, excluding De Terugkeer van Tambelon (The Return of Tambelon) and, never translated into Dutch, The Ice Cream Wars. Four volumes were released by Bridge Entertainment Group with covers featuring the 2003 Ponies.

1. My Little Pony Deel 3 - De Geest van het Landgoedparadijs/De Gevluchte Bloemen Deel 1 (The Ghost of Paradise Estate, Fugitive Flowers Part 1)
2. My Little Pony Deel 3 - De Gevluchte Bloemen Deel 2/De Magische Munten (Fugitive Flowers Part 2, The Magic Coins)
3. My Little Pony Deel 3 - Crunch de Rotshond/Het Felle Licht (Crunch the Rockdog, Bright Lights)
4. My Little Pony Deel 4 - De Glazen Prinses/De Jacht naar de Schat/Spike's Zoektocht (The Glass Princess, Sweet Stuff and the Treasure Hunt, Spike's Search)

Bridge Entertainment released the remaining episodes in two 'Mega Kids DVD' volumes.

My Little Pony Mega Kids DVDs
My Little Pony Mega Kids DVD	My Little Pony Mega Kids DVD 2
De opstand in Paradise Estate (The Revolt of Paradise Estate); De Baby Pony (Pony Puppy); De Prins en de Pony (The Prince and the Ponies); Redding op Midnight Castle (Rescue at Midnight Castle); Liefje, het is koud buiten (Baby, It's Cold Outside); De Bijna Drakenridder (Would Be Dragonslayer); Een omgekeerde Wereld (Mish Mash Melee); Woe ben ik (Woe Is Me); De Grote Regenboogrover (The Great Rainbow Caper); Een Toverkunst (Little Piece of Magic); De vlucht naar Cloud Castle (Flight to Cloud Castle); Zoektocht naar de Gouden Hoefijzers (The Golden Horseshoes); Somnabula, de heks (Somnambula)	Door de deur (Through the Door); De missie van de Princess Pony's (The Quest of the Princess Ponies); Ontsnapping naar Catrina (Escape from Catrina); Het einde van Flutter Vallei (The End of Flutter Valley)

== France (Region 2, French language) ==
10 volumes of the French translation 'Mon Petit Poney' are available.

1. Mon Petit Poney: Le film (My Little Pony: The Movie)

2. Le carnaval au Pays merveilleux (The End of Flutter Valley).

3. Gourmande et la chasse au trésor (Sweet Stuff and the Treasure Hunt). Also includes:

- Quelque chose de magique (Little Piece of Magic)
- La guerre des deux crèmes (The Ice Cream Wars)
- Curieuse chasse au dragon (Would Be Dragonslayer)
- Au delà de la porte d'Oz (Through the Door)

4. Les Pièces Magiques (The Magic Coins). Also includes Fleurs en fuite (Fugitive Flowers)

5. Un prince et quelques poneys (The Prince and the Ponies). Also includes Les princesses poneys cherchent une reine (The Quest of the Princess Ponies) & Un drôle de mic mac (Mish Mash Melee)

6. Le Pique-Nique includes:

- Sous l'emprise de Catherine (Escape from Catrina)
- Quatre fers à cheval en or (The Golden Horseshoes)
- La grande escapade de l'arc-en-ciel (The Great Rainbow Caper)
- L'odyssée de Léo (Spike's Search)

7. Les bébés poneys includes Bébé il fait froid dehors (Baby, It's Cold Outside) & Les feux de la rampe (Bright Light)

8. La fête des Poneys includes Somnambula & Le fantôme de la maison paradis (The Ghost of Paradise Estate)

9. La Princesse Poney includes:

- Les Princesses Poney (possibly The Quest of the Princess Ponies)
- L'Odyssée de Léo (Spike's Search)
- Gourmande et la Chasse aux Trésors (Sweet Stuff and the Treasure Hunt)
- Le Miroir de la Princesse (The Glass Princess)

10. Le pays des reves. Includes previously released episodes:

- Somnambula
- La guerre de deux crèmes (The Ice Cream Wars)
- Un Prince et quelques Poneys (The Prince and the Ponies)
- 4 fers à cheval en or (The Golden Horseshoes)
- Bébé il fait froid dehors (Baby, It's Cold Outside)
- Les pièces magiques (The Magic Coins)

11. Le grand voyage Includes:

- Le miroir de la princesse (The Glass Princess)
- Le château dans les nuages (Flight to Cloud Castle)

12. Bienvenue à Poneyville Includes:

- La grande invasion du château de minuit (Rescue at Midnight Castle)
- Pauvre de moi (Woe Is Me)

13. La valée des rêves Includes:

- Révolte à la maison paradis (The Revolt of Paradise Estate)
- Crunch, le chien de pierre (Crunch the Rockdog)
- Dinah le visiteur (Pony Puppy)

Episode not released include Le retour de Tambelon (The Return of Tambelon)

== Germany (Region 2, German language) ==
12 volumes of the German translation Mein Kleines Pony have been released in Germany, along with the movie.

1. Der Zaubertaler (The Magic Coins)
2. Kransch, der Felsenhund including Die geheimnisvolle Tür (Crunch the Rockdog, Through the Door)
3. Die verlorenen Schatten (Bright Lights)
4. Die Rückkehr von Tambelon (The Return of Tambelon)
5. Die Spiegelglasprinzessin (The Glass Princess)
6. Der Unglücksrabe including Der Drachenkämpfer & Der Streit um den Regenbogen (Woe Is Me, Would Be Dragonslayer, The Great Rainbow Caper)
7. Die Suche nach den Prinzess-Ponies (The Quest of the Princess Ponies)
8. Die uralte Hexe including Eine kleine Zauberfantasie & Auf Drachensuche (Somnambula, Little Piece of Magic, Spike's Search)
9. Abenteuer am Mitternachtsfluss including Die Erdhexe Katinka (Rescue from Midnight Castle, Escape from Catrina)
10. Das Gespenst vom Pony-Paradies (The Ghost of Paradise Estate)
11. Blumenflüchtlinge including Aufstand im Spielparadies (Fugitive Flowers, The Revolt of Paradise Estate)
12. Die große Kälte including Die goldenen Hufe (Baby, It's Cold Outside, The Golden Horseshoes)
13. My Little Pony - Der Spielfilm: Abenteuer im Ponyland (My Little Pony: The Movie)

Episodes not released include Das Ende des Zauberflügeltals (The End of Flutter Valley), Die Jagd nach dem Schatz (Sweet Stuff and the Treasure Hunt), Im Wald von Mysthis (Mish Mash Melee), Das Schwebende Schloß (Flight to Cloud Castle), Die Eiscremeschlacht (The Ice Cream Wars) and Gefahr für die Baby-Zwillinge (The Prince and the Ponies)
