= My Little Pony (1982 toyline) =

Line of toys

- Original work: Toys
- Years: 1982–1992

Print publications
- Comics: Egmont My Little Pony My Little Pony and Friends

Films and television
- Film(s): My Little Pony: The Movie (1986)
- Animated series: My Little Pony (1986-1987, part of My Little Pony 'n Friends); My Little Pony Tales (1992)
- Television special(s): My Little Pony (1984); My Little Pony: Escape from Catrina (1985)

Miscellaneous
- Toy(s): My Little Pony

The first incarnation of My Little Pony toyline was launched in 1982 by American toy company Hasbro, as a successor to the My Pretty Pony toys. It subsequently became a media franchise, starting with the 1984 animated special Rescue at Midnight Castle. This incarnation is unofficially known among collectors as "Generation One" or "G1".

== Toys ==
My Little Pony
- Company: Hasbro
- Country: United States
- Availability: 1982–1992

After the relative lack of success of the My Pretty Pony toy line, Hasbro introduced six smaller and colorful versions of the toy in 1982, sold under the title My Little Pony. The toy line led to an explosion of merchandise under the My Little Pony brand. The pony toys were followed by winged ponies, Unicorn ponies, Flutter Ponies and Sea Ponies among others. Flutter Ponies were smaller and thinner than Pegasus Ponies, and had fluttering wings. The Summerwing Ponies are ponies that also have butterfly wings. Windy Wing and the Summer Wing Ponies were smaller than the Flutter Ponies and were proportioned in a similar way, with larger, butterfly-like wings. The Happy Tails Ponies are ponies whose tails move when squeezed. The Sea Ponies resembled seahorses, and were produced as both adults and babies. The Twice As Fancy Ponies are ponies with their bodies covered in symbols. The Merry Go Round Ponies are ponies that have blankets on their backs. Rainbow Curl Ponies are ponies with rainbow curled hair. Magic Message Ponies are ponies with heat sensitive Cutie Marks. Sunshine Ponies are ponies with hair that change color in the sun. Glow 'n Show Ponies are ponies that have glowing translucent bodies filled with bits confetti some of which glows in the dark. The Perfume Puff Ponies are ponies that have super poofy hair. The Candy Cane Ponies are ponies that have a candy scent and their hair are curled to resemble candy canes. The Sundae Best Ponies are ponies with an ice cream scent. The Rockin' Beat Ponies are rock music themed ponies. Dance 'n Prance Ponies are ponies with hair accessories. Precious Pocket Ponies are ponies that have 3D symbols with accessories. Tropical Ponies are tropical-themed ponies. Teeny Tiny Baby Ponies are babies ponies that are smaller. Peek-A-Boo Baby Ponies are the first babies to be able to turn their heads. Sweet Ballerina Ponies are ponies with movable limbs and head. Loving Family Ponies are a family of ponies that consist of a mother, a father, and a baby. Drink 'n Wet Ponies are baby ponies that wet their diapers. First Tooth Baby Ponies are baby ponies with first teeth. Windy Wing Ponies are baby ponies with butterfly wings. Summer Wing Ponies are ponies that have fluffy manes and tails with butterfly wings. Newborn Twin Ponies are baby ponies that are two twins. Baby Sparkle Ponies are baby ponies that are translucent with sparkles. Baby Fancy Pants Ponies are baby ponies that have entire diapers printed on them rather than the normal symbol. Sweetberry Ponies are ponies with a berry scent and have berry confections and as their symbols. There were also male ponies called 'Big Brother Ponies', which had slightly larger bodies and feathered hooves resembling those of Clydesdale horses. In addition, there are also female ponies called 'Sweetheart Sister Ponies', which are slimmer ponies, as well as Playtime Baby Brother Ponies.

Many other different sets of My Little Pony variations were produced, the first being the Rainbow Ponies in 1983. Other variations included the So Soft Ponies (covered in flocking), Twinkle Eyed Ponies which had rhinestones in place of eyes, Twice As Fancy Ponies with patterns covering most of the body, Sparkle Ponies which are ponies with bodies that are translucent with glitter, Brush 'n Grow Ponies which had a longer-than-usual mane and tail stored inside the body that can be pulled to a longer length, Pony Friends - animals designed in the same style as the ponies, such as a lion named Kingsley, a giraffe named Creamsicle, a kangaroo named Baby Hoppy, and a zebra named Zig Zag, among others including a llama Cha Cha, a moose named Oakly, a dinosaur named Cutesaurus, a camel named Spunky, an elephant named Edgar, a sheep named Baby Woolly, a panda named Baby Nectar, and a cow calf named Baby Leafy - and Baby Ponies, some of which were smaller versions of previously released ponies and presented as those ponies' foals. The first generation of My Little Pony toys was sold in the U.S. until 1992, and was marketed internationally until 1995. The final year of sales in the U.S. was advertised as the "celebration year" of My Little Pony. Others also include Dream Beauties, which look like realistic versions.

=== Mail-order ponies ===
All packaging came with Horseshoe Points, which could be used to obtain discounts on special ponies available only through mail order. The Horseshoe Point program was offered in both the US and UK, although the items available for purchase varied by country. Mail-order ponies were generally reissues like Majesty, which was previously available only with the Dream Castle Playset, or unique ponies such as the first boy pony, Lucky the stallion. Another line of exclusively mail-order ponies was the Birthflower ponies, which featured a pony for every month of the year. All had white bodies with pink hair and tails; their names were Carnation, Violet, Daffodil, Daisy, Lily of the Valley, Rose, Water Lily, Poppy, Morning Glory, Cosmos, Chrysanthemum and Holly. Special baby ponies, such as the Pearlized Baby Ponies and Twice As Fancy babies, were also available by mail order. Some mail-order ponies, such as Sweet Scoops, Goldilocks and Rapunzel are rare and sought after by collectors.

=== International ponies ===
Some companies were licensed under Hasbro to produce their own line of ponies instead of shipping them from China or Hong Kong, where the vast majority of ponies were produced; these companies were located in Argentina, Brazil, France, Greece, India, Italy, Macau, Mexico and Spain. Some of these ponies are very similar to their Asian counterparts. For example, the Italian Clio looks very similar to Glory, with the most obvious difference being a non-glittery symbol. Some, such as the Mexican Twilight are a variation on existing colors, poses or species, while others, such as the Greek Ladybird, are completely unique to their region.

Due to factors such as limited production and their condition, international ponies tend to bring a higher price than their more-common counterparts. Ponies from certain countries are also easier to find, while others, such as those made in Greece and Brazil, are more difficult. There are also international ponies which were distributed from China or Hong Kong, but made exclusively for a particular region, either a variant of the local ponies or completely new types.

Most ponies released in the United States were found in Western Europe as well. The majority of US domestic mail-order ponies never appeared overseas, although many countries had their own mail-order systems. Many of the excess ponies offered by mail order in the US were bagged, carded and sold overseas. Some of the ponies and playsets were given different names abroad; for example, the Big Brother Ponies were known as Adventure Boy Ponies in the UK.

=== Related lines ===
Petite Ponies

Petite Ponies were tiny pony figures sold in sets. Some had different characteristics, such as brushable hair, pearlized or glow-in-the-dark bodies. Under the base of each was an engraved hoof, which allowed the pony to function as a key to the Petite Playsets. Most of these smaller ponies had no official name, and many had the same symbols. They were sold from 1989 to 1991; only Earth Ponies and Pegasus Ponies were produced.

Dream Beauties

These larger figures made of hard plastic were advertised as "grown up" ponies and called Dream Beauties. Unlike My Little Pony toys, they looked more like real horses in proportions and musculature. The Dream Beauties came in a range of decorated and accessorized styles, including plastic beads along the base of their manes, ornamentation in the style of carousel horses, glitter or pearlescent finishes, and elaborate symbols, some extending the full length of the body. All were Earth Ponies, except for the three Highflying Beauties, which had large, multicolored wings. They were sold from 1989 to 1990.

My Little Kitty/Puppy/Bunny

Cat, dog and rabbit sets were sold under the Hasbro MLP logo during the early 1990s. Each Lil' Litters set consisted of a mother, two babies and a plastic comb. The mothers had flocked bodies, and the babies were miniature plastic figures. Kitty mothers had cottony tails, puppy mothers had either silky or cottony ears and bunny mothers had cottony tails and silky forelocks. There were also Nursery Family sets, featuring the puppy and kitty characters.

Takara Variants

In 1985, Takara released a line of My Little Pony toys, which were released in two types: Osharena Pony (おしゃれなポニー, Osharena ponī) and Kawaii Pony (かわいいポニー, Kawaī ponī). Only released in Japan, these versions represented a more anthropomorphic take on the toyline. They are considered as the most rare of the "G1" collection due to how they were released.

== Media ==
=== Mid-1980s animated features ===
As a part of Hasbro's media strategy, My Little Pony, along with their other properties like Transformers and G.I. Joe, was adapted into following animated features:

- My Little Pony (later retitled Rescue at Midnight Castle), the first 22-minute syndicated prime-time special premiered in 1984
- My Little Pony: Escape from Catrina, the second 22-minute syndicated special premiered in 1985, in which Tammy Grimes voiced the title character.
- My Little Pony: The Movie, the first and only theatrical feature film, released in 1986. Directed by Michael Joens, it featured the voices of Rhea Perlman, Madeline Kahn, Tony Randall and Danny DeVito. It had mediocre box-office earnings, grossing almost $6 million in the United States, and received mostly negative reviews from critics.
- My Little Pony 'n Friends, a half-hour syndicated television series that featured various characters from Hasbro's properties by having My Little Pony in its first segment and either Glo Friends, Potato Head Kids or MoonDreamers in the second segment. The My Little Pony segment promoted many of the toys available in 1986–1987, featuring a regular cast of Earth, Pegasus and Unicorn ponies with guest appearances by new lines, such as the Flutter and Princess Ponies. It also used the jingles for each brand, as did other series tied into Hasbro properties. Consisting of 65 episodes, it had the version of the first two specials, each edited into two episodes respectively.

The TV specials, the film, and the TV series were all set in the same milieu: Dream Valley, a land inhabited by witches, goblins and other magical creatures with whom the ponies, their human friend Megan, and their dragon friend Spike interacted.

In 2004, the first season of the original My Little Pony television series was released on DVD. The four-DVD collection features the two prime-time television specials and 50 episodes from the original series. Some songs from the original airing of the two specials have been cut, leaving the specials as they appeared when syndicated as part of the cartoon series. The ten-episode miniseries The End of Flutter Valley was released on DVD in 2005. 2006 brought the release of episodes from the second season, with two DVD releases: Flight to Cloud Castle and Other Stories and Quest of the Princess Ponies and Other Stories, as well as a DVD entitled Two Great Pony Tales with The Magic Coins and The Glass Princess available in eight episodes.

=== My Little Pony Tales (1992) ===
My Little Pony Tales, premiered on July 3, 1992 on Disney Channel, was set in a different environment. This series anthropomorphized the ponies further than the works from the mid-1980s, as the ponies lived in a town, went to school, ran businesses, went on vacation and exchanged currency for goods.

=== Publications ===
Two British comic series were published by Egmont during the era.

== Other merchandises ==
Besides the toys, merchandise included children's bedding and room decorations, plush toys, puzzles, clothing, books and playsets. There were also unusual items such as a pomander and toy sewing machines. In 1985, a picture disc featuring songs by Tony Markey was released.

During the 2000s, like other fictional characters of the 1980s, My Little Pony merchandise aimed at young women has also appeared, including T-shirts depicting "G1" ponies in a "retro" style, featuring slogans such as "Livin' in the 80s" or "I Love Rainbows".

- To celebrate the 25th anniversary of My Little Pony, Hasbro reproduced the original 1982 My Little Pony collection. The ponies reproduced were Blue Belle, Butterscotch, Cotton Candy, Snuzzle, Blossom and Minty. Hasbro has also reproduced the Generation One Rainbow Ponies, Moonstone, Parasol, Skydancer, Starshine, Sunlight and Windy.
- Generation One Ponies key chains were sold in Japan. Ponies sold as key chains were Milky Way, Dancing Butterflies, Sugarberry, Starbow, Rainribbon, Sunribbon and Baby Stockings, which came in either red or green. They had comb-able hair, and came with a small comb. The key chains are rare, and valued by collectors.
