= My Little Pony (Egmont comics) =

1980/90s comic book series

My Little Pony and My Little Pony and Friends

Publication information
- Publisher: London Editions Magazines (Fleetway Editions); Egmont UK
- Genre: Fantasy
- Publication date: September 1985 – October 1994
- No. of issues: My Little Pony 224 issues. My Little Pony and Friends 51 issues

My Little Pony is a British tie-in comic books to the toys of the same name, published by Egmont under the license of Hasbro, during the so-called "Generation One" era. There were two publications: The first comic, simply known as My Little Pony, ran from 1985 to 1993 and published 224 issues; The second comic, My Little Pony and Friends, featuring the characters from the American television anthology series with the similar name, ran from 1987 to 1994 and featured 51 issues. Art was sent via fax to England from a Spanish art company, Selecciones Ilustradas. The comics were published by London Editions Magazines (renamed Fleetway Editions in 1992) and Egmont UK.

== Continuity ==
The comics, although sharing many characters, locations and stories from the cartoon (My Little Pony and Friends comic 30 included a story featuring the Smooze and the other antagonists from the 1986 movie), the comics seem to be set in their own continuity, with such differences to the cartoon as the complete absence of Megan's younger siblings, Danny and Molly (except for And Friends comic 30, where Reeka and Draggle, Hydia's daughters from the movie, disguise themselves as Danny and Molly to trick Megan). Other stories and characters were exclusive to the comics too, such as The Know-All Gnomes, Wizard Wantall, Rob Rabbit, Flower Lady, and the Forgetful (or Fun) Witch. The comics also featured characters from fairy tales and legends, such as Humpty Dumpty and the Man In The Moon. Another difference is that all ponies possessed magical qualities, rather than just unicorns as in the cartoon.

== Comics ==
=== My Little Pony ===
| Issue No. | Issue Title | Stories Featured | Publication date | Special Events |
|---|---|---|---|---|
| 1 | A Special Present | A Special Present, The Flying Dragon, The Enchanted Mirror, Sparkler is Upset, A New Show Ring | 5 September 1985 | Featured the origin of the baby ponies (The Enchanted Mirror) |
| 2 | The Flower Festival | The Flower Festival, The Baby Ponies Meet Some New Friends, The Amazing Apples, Little Boy Lost | 19 September 1985 | |
| 3 | Where Is The Waterfall? | Where Is The Waterfall?, Where is Seaspray?, The Sad Princess, The Pony Garden Competition | 3 October 1985 | |
| 4 | One Autumn Day | One Autumn Day, A Shock for Twinkles, The Message In the Bottle, A Surprise for Surprise | 17 October 1985 | |
| 5 | Merry Music | Merry Music, The Silver Challenge Cup, The Uninvited Guest, Pantomime Parade, Spike is Naughty | 31 October 1985 | |
| 6 | Cotton Candy's Washing Day | Cotton Candy's Washing Day, Baby Glory and the Grumbleweed, Moonstone and the Tired Tailor, Moondancer's Mischievous Magic | 14 November 1985 | |
| 7 | Little Pony Circus | Little Pony Circus, Skyflier's Magic Kite, Heart Throb and the Lavender Lady, The Missing Treasure, The Magic Paint Box | 28 November 1985 | |
| 8 | The Wishing Tree | The Wishing Tree, Firefly and the Swallow, The Curious Riddles, The Strange Visitor, The Christmas Market, The Land of Crosspatches, Spike the Babysitter, The Little Fir Tree, The New Year Gymkhana | 12 December 1985 | Featured the origin of the baby sea ponies (smaller versions of the adult sea ponies) in The Wishing Tree. |
| 9 | The Enchanted Ice Cream | The Enchanted Ice Cream, Shabby Scarecrow, The Tiny Gold Wheel, The Frozen Pond | 2 January 1986 | |
| 10 | Winter Wonderland | Winter Wonderland, Confetti the Clever Conjuror, Prince Berin's Quest, Tickle To the Rescue | 16 January 1986 | |
| 11 | Fun In the Snow | Fun In the Snow, The Peculiar Pets, Applejack's Amazing Adventure, Duck Soup Disappears | 30 January 1986 | Featured the origin of the Twinkle Eyed Ponies (Applejack's Amazing Adventure) |
| 12 | Trickles To the Rescue | Trickles To the Rescue, Lemon Drop Learns a Lesson, The Baby Ponies' Spinneroo, Pony Land in Danger (Part 1) | 13 February 1986 | |
| 13 | Dream Castle Spring Clean | Dream Castle Spring Clean, The Crock of Gold, Pony Land in Danger (Part 2), A Star For the Sandman | 27 February 1986 | |
| 14 | Home For a Cuckoo | Home For a Cuckoo, Bow Tie's Royal Ride, Pony Land in Danger (Part 3), Carnival Day at the Waterfall | 13 March 1986 | Featured the first appearance of Megan and Sundance in the comics (Carnival Day at the Waterfall). |
| 15 | The March Hare's Tea Party | The March Hare's Tea Party, A Shock for Applejack, The Magic Feather (Part 1), Sparkler's Special Stone | 27 March 1986 | |
| 16 | Megan and the Magic Puddle | Megan and the Magic Puddle, Parasol and the Ugly Princess, The Magic Feather (Part 2), Moonstone and the Mysterious Moss | 10 April 1986 | Featured the first appearance of the Beddy-Bye Eyed Babies in the comic (Megan and the Magic Puddle). |
| 17 | Little Pony Picnic | Little Pony Picnic, Peachy's Disco Party, A Lucky Catch, The Magic Feather (Part 3) | 24 April 1986 | |
| 18 | Sparkler's Secret | Sparkler's Secret, Sea Shimmer and the Sea Dragon, The Strange Shell, Masquerade and the Magic Moonbeam (Part 1) | 8 May 1986 | |
| 19 | Win a Little Pony! | Little Pony Race, The Quilt of Memories, Masquerade and the Magic Moonbeam (Part 2), Pinwheel and the Pillywiggins | 22 May 1986 | |
| 20 | The Fashion Show | The Fashion Show, The Needle in the Haystack, Masquerade and the Magic Moonbeam (Part 3), Summer Storm | 5 June 1986 | |
| 21 | The Magic Telescope | The Magic Telescope, Green Hooves!, The Disappearing Honey, The Mysterious Picture (Part 1) | 19 June 1986 | |
| 22 | A Sunny Day in Pony Land | A Sunny Day in Pony Land, The Very Special Spectacles, Peachy Takes a Holiday, The Mysterious Picture (Part 2) | 3 July 1986 | |
| 23 | Sparkler's Special Friend | Sparkler's Special Friend, A Pillow For Princess Pearl, The Mysterious Picture (Part 3), A Posy For the Princess | 17 July 1986 | |
| 24 | The Dancing Dragon | The Dancing Dragon, The Magic Sweet Shop (Part 1), A Worrying Time (Part 1), Hopscotch and Humpty Dumpty | 31 July 1986 | |
| 25 | Seaside Concert | Seaside Concert, The Magic Sweet Shop (Part 2), A Worrying Time (Part 2), Bubbles and the Mudpie Birds | 14 August 1986 | Featured the first appearance of Buttons and Wind Whistler in the comics (Seaside Concert). |
| 26 | Happy Harvest! | Happy Harvest!, The Magic Sweet Shop (Part 3), A Worrying Time (Part 3), The Sand Sculpture Competition | 28 August 1986 | |
| 27 | Happy Birthday My Little Pony Comic! | Spike's Lucky Dip, Jelly Jester, Party Parade | 11 September 1986 | Featuring the origin of Baby Lucky, the first male pony (Spike's Lucky Dip). |
| 28 | Paint Pot Magic | Paint Pot Magic, Bow Tie's Basket, The Strange Key (Part 1), The Whispering Corn | 25 September 1986 | |
| 29 | Gingerbread's Baking Day | Gingerbread's Baking Day, Little Pony Pet Show, A Terrible Accident, The Strange Key (Part 2) | 9 October 1986 | Features the first appearance of the first set of Flutter Ponies in the comics (A Terrible Accident). |
| 30 | The Mystery of the Missing Moon | The Mystery of the Missing Moon, The Strange Key (Part 3), Too Many Apples!, One Moonlit Night | 23 October 1986 | |
| 31 | The Flying Carpet | The Flying Carpet, The Magic Garden (Part 1), Baby Lucky Disobeys, The Haunted Hill | 6 November 1986 | |
| 32 | The Whispering Tree | The Whispering Tree, Lemon Drop and the Little Pony Weathervane (Part 1), The Magic Garden (Part 2), It's Missed a Chime! | 20 November 1986 | |
| 33 | Junk-It and the Float-Arounds | Junk-It and the Float-Arounds, The Magic Garden (Part 3), Lemon Drop and the Weathervane Pony (Part 2), Spellbound! | 4 December 1986 | |
| 34 | Win Megan and Sundance! | The Magic Ribbon, A Very Special Pudding, The Curious Cracker, A Stocking For Spike | 18 December 1986 | Featuring the first appearance of Shady in the comics (The Magic Ribbon). |
| 35 | The Snowdrop Ceremony | The Snowdrop Ceremony, Twilight and the Shining Star Lantern, Confetti and the Paper Pixies, Cotton Candy's Enchanted Time | 31 December 1986 | Featuring the first appearance of the second set (Pearly N' Pretty) of the Baby Sea Ponies (The Snowdrop Ceremony). |

=== My Little Pony and Friends ===
| Issue No. | Issue Title | Stories Featured | Publication Date | "Friends" Featured | Special Events |
|---|---|---|---|---|---|
| 1 | Untitled | ? | February 1987 | Glo Friends | Featured the first appearance of Baby Cuddles in either series of the comics. |
| 2 | Untitled | ? | April 1987 | MoonDreamers | |
| 3 | Untitled | ? | June 1987 | MoonDreamers | |
| 4 | Untitled | ? | August 1987 | MoonDreamers, Glo Friends, Potato Head Kids | |
| 5 | Untitled | ? | October 1987 | Glo Friends, Potato Head Kids | |
| 6 | Untitled | ? | December 1987 | MoonDreamers, Glo Friends, Potato Head Kids | This was the last issue to feature the MoonDreamers. |
| 7 | Untitled | ? | February 1988 | Glo Friends, Potato Head Kids | Featuring the first appearance of a First Tooth Baby Pony in either of the comics (in this case, Baby Lickety-Split) (Tutti Fruitti's Pancake Party). |
