= George Arthur Bloom =

Canadian screenwriter

George Arthur Bloom is an American-born Canadian screenwriter and producer known for his work on Nelvana television titles such as The Magic School Bus and Cyberchase. He also wrote the pilots for The Transformers and My Little Pony, as well as a number of installments of the My Little Pony series such as My Little Pony 'n Friends and My Little Pony Tales. For over four decades, Bloom has written television and film scripts for children and adults alike.

== Television credits ==
- series head writer denoted in bold

=== Live-action series ===
- The New Dick Van Dyke Show (1971)
- All in the Family (1972)
- The Julie Andrews Hour (1972)
- Carter Country (1977)
- Chico and the Man (1977)
- Phyllis (1977)
- Welcome Back, Kotter (1977)
- Starsky & Hutch (1979)
- The Incredible Hulk (1980)
- Alice (1981)
- Too Close for Comfort (1982)
- Love, Sidney (1982–1983)
- Condo (1983)
- 9 to 5 (1983)
- Throb (1987)

=== Animated series ===
- The Transformers (1984)
- My Little Pony (1986–1987)
- Potato Head Kids (1986)
- The Glo Friends (1986–1987)
- Jem (1987)
- Bucky O'Hare and the Toad Wars (1991)
- Conan the Adventurer (1992–1993)
- My Little Pony Tales (1992)
- Transformers: Generation 2 (1993)
- Street Sharks (1994)
- Tenko and the Guardians of the Magic (1995)
- The Magic School Bus (1995–1997)
- G.I. Joe Extreme (1996)
- Street Fighter (1996)
- Salty’s Lighthouse (1997)
- Cyberchase (2002–present)
- Space Racers (2017)

== Film credits ==
=== Live-action ===
- Knife for the Ladies (1974)
- The Last Flight of Noah’s Ark (1980)
- Shades of Love: Moonlight Flight (1988)
- Shades of Love: Sunset Court (1988)
- Shades of Love: The Man Who Guards the Greenhouse (1988)
- Shades of Love: The Emerald Tear (1988)
- Any Day Now (2012)

=== Animated ===
- The Charmkins (1983)
- My Little Pony: The Movie (1986)
- Cinderella (1994)
- Leo the Lion: King of the Jungle (1994)
- Alice in Wonderland (1995)
