= My Little Pony: Equestria Girls (disambiguation) =

My Little Pony: Equestria Girls is a Hasbro toy line.

My Little Pony: Equestria Girls may also refer to:

- My Little Pony: Equestria Girls (2017 television specials), also known as Magical Movie Night and Tales of Canterlot High
- My Little Pony: Equestria Girls (film), 2013
- My Little Pony: Equestria Girls (web series), 2017 to 2020

== See also ==
- List of My Little Pony: Equestria Girls animations
- My Little Pony (disambiguation)
