= My Little Pony (TV special) =

1984 American animated film

- Promotional poster
- Based on: My Little Pony by Bonnie Zacherle
- Written by: George Arthur Bloom
- Directed by: Gerry Chiniquy; Milton Gray; Tom Ray; Nelson Shin
- Starring: Sandy Duncan; Tony Randall
- Music by: Johnny Douglas; Theme: Ford Kinder; Spencer Michlin; Songs: Tommy Goodman
- Country of origin: United States
- Original language: English

Production
- Producers: Bob Richardson; Karl Geurs
- Editor: Robert T. Gillis
- Running time: 22 minutes
- Production companies: Hasbro; Sunbow Productions; Marvel Productions; Toei Animation

Original release
- Release: April 14, 1984

My Little Pony, also known as Rescue at Midnight Castle, Escape from Midnight Castle, or Rescue from Midnight Castle, and released later as Firefly's Adventure, My Little Pony in Dreamland and My Little Pony: Rescue at Midnight Castle is a 1984 American animated television special based on the toyline by Hasbro. It was released during Year Two of the line, and featured the voices of Sandy Duncan and Tony Randall. A second special was produced in 1985, Escape from Catrina.

== Plot ==
In Ponyland, the ponies of Dream Castle are enjoying a sunny day when the sky darkens above them. A monstrous flock of creatures known as Stratadons appears, with one of them being ridden by Scorpan. The beasts swoop down and carry off two of the ponies, prompting Firefly to take off in search of help. Scorpan soon returns to Midnight Castle with his prisoners, where he is greeted by a small dragon named Spike. He then goes before his master Tirac, who reprimands Scorpan for only capturing two ponies when he needs four to pull his Chariot of Midnight. Spike speaks up in Scorpan's defense, angering the shadowy creature and prompting Scorpan to embrace the young dragon protectively.

Elsewhere, a girl named Megan is tending to her ordinary horse T.J. when Firefly appears and asks her for help. She is eventually persuaded to climb on the Pegasus' back, and flown to Ponyland despite her own objections that she is not a hero. Shortly after the two arrive at Dream Castle, the Stratadons return, carrying off two more ponies. Megan attempts to intervene and ends up falling towards the ground, only to be unexpectedly saved by Scorpan and warned not to interfere. Moved by anger at the monstrous attack, Megan chooses instead to help the ponies rescue their friends.

Scorpan returns to Midnight Castle, and the four captive ponies are brought before Tirac, revealed to be a wicked centaur. He has the young pony Ember imprisoned, as she is too small for his purposes, before transforming the other three into hideous dragons using his Rainbow of Darkness. Tirac then threatens to behead Spike if Scorpan does not capture a fourth pony. Meanwhile, Megan and the others head towards Midnight Castle, only for the rope bridge they are traveling across to collapse, dropping Megan and Applejack into the water.

Fortunately, the two are saved by the Sea Ponies, who give them a shell so that they can call upon them for help at any time. Megan's party then goes to visit the Moochick, a diminutive wizard who gives them the magical Rainbow of Light to help them counter Tirac. The group then reaches Midnight Castle, and with the Sea Ponies' help are able to cross the river surrounding it to get inside, only to be ambushed by Tirac and his guards when they attempt to steal the Rainbow of Darkness.

Tirac turns Applejack into the final dragon needed to pull his chariot, and he sets out to bring eternal night upon Ponyland. The ponies join forces with Scorpan, who freed Ember, and together try to stop Tirac by taking the Rainbow of Darkness, but prove to be no match for the villain. Megan then opens the locket containing the Rainbow of Light, a small bit of magic that is seemingly consumed by the Rainbow of Darkness. However, the Rainbow of Light overpowers its evil counterpart, destroying Tirac and undoing his evil work. His various minions are returned to their normal forms, with Scorpan turning out to be a prince while Spike is revealed to be a naturally born dragon. As the credits roll, Firefly carries Megan back home where she hugs T.J.

== Voice cast ==
- Sandy Duncan as Firefly, Medley
- Tony Randall as The Moochick
- Charlie Adler as Spike
- Tammy Amerson as Megan
- Fran Brill as Applejack
- Victor Caroli as Tirac
- Laura Dean as Twilight, Bow Tie and Cotton Candy
- Carol Goodheart
- Lani Groves as Wavedancer
- Yolanda Brica Lee Lewis
- Lynne Lipton as Ember
- Ullanda McCullough as Seawinkle
- Gerrianne Raphael as Sealight
- Ron Taylor as Scorpan/The Prince

== Musical numbers ==
1. "My Little Pony Opening Chorus"
2. "Dancing On Air" - Firefly and Megan (sung by Sandy Duncan and Tammy Amerson)
3. "Call Upon the Sea Ponies" - Sea Ponies (sung by Ullanda McCullough, Lani Groves, and Gerriane Raphael)
4. "Little Piece of Rainbow" - Moochick (sung by Tony Randall)
5. "My Little Pony Closing Chorus"

== Impact ==
=== My Little Pony 'n Friends airing ===
The special was edited into a two part episode of My Little Pony 'n Friends television series and re-titled "Escape from Midnight Castle". The opening animated sequence with narrated voice-actor credits, as well as its end credits, were removed and replaced with the standard 1986 TV series opening/closing. Also omitted is the two and a half-minute animated musical number "Little Piece of Rainbow", sung by Tony Randall. The episode aired at the end of the TV show's first season, in November 1986. A similar edit was done to the follow-up 1985 TV special, Escape from Catrina, which aired at the end of the second season as "Escape from Katrina".

=== Inspiration for Friendship Is Magic ===
Lauren Faust got much inspiration for My Little Pony: Friendship Is Magic from this special, and the 1986 television series. She gave similar personalities to the new generation of ponies from the older series and specials, making them live on for a new generation. Tirac, renamed as Tirek, also appears in the series as a major antagonist, introduced in the two-part season 4 finale "Twilight's Kingdom" with a cameo appearance by Scorpan in the flashback sequence.
