= Potato Head Kids =

- Genre: Fantasy; Comedy
- Voices of: Ina Fried; Susie Garbo; Linda Gary; Scott Grimes; Jody Lambert; Christina Lange; Kenneth Mars; Kellie Martin; Anne Marie McEvoy; David Mendenhall; Scott Menville; Breckin Meyer; Laura Mooney; Andrew Potter
- Composer: Robert J. Walsh
- Country of origin: United States
- Original language: English
- No. of episodes: 23

Production
- Production companies: Hasbro; Sunbow Productions; Marvel Productions; AKOM

Original release
- Network: Syndication
- Release: September 24, 1986 – February 25, 1987

Potato Head Kids is an American animated television series produced in 1986 and syndicated from September 24, 1986 to February 25, 1987. It was made to pair with My Little Pony 'n Friends. An episode of My Little Pony was played for 15 minutes, and then an episode of Potato Head Kids, MoonDreamers, or The Glo Friends was played. It also aired on CBN Family Channel from 1989 to 1990.

== Premise ==
Potato Head Kids was an outgrowth of the Mr. Potato Head character franchise. Mr. Potato Head now played an adult figure in the lives of the title kids, a varied bunch of anthropomorphic potatoes with different personalities. The Potato Head Kids do a lot of things in their life while also clashing with a gang of potato-hating delinquents led by Grease.

== Characters ==
- Mr. Potato Head (voiced by Kenneth Mars)
- Mrs. Potato Head (voiced by Linda Gary)
- Big Chip (voiced by David Mendenhall) is the leader of the Potato Head Kids.
- Puff (voiced by Anne Marie McEvoy) is a bonnet-wearing potato.
- Spud (voiced by Breckin Meyer) is a cowboy hat-wearing potato that talks like a cowboy.
- Lumpy (voiced by Ina Fried) is a beanie hat-wearing potato.
- Lolly (voiced by Kellie Martin)
- Slick (voiced by Scott Grimes)
- Spike (voiced by Scott Menville)
- Smarty Pants (voiced by Susie Garbo) is a female potato in a green hair bow who is the smartest of the potatoes.

=== Villains ===
- Grease's Gang are a group of delinquents and the main antagonists of the series.
  - Grease is a kid who is the leader of his gang. He has a crush on Puff and tries to marry her in the Robin Hood episode.
  - Auna is a female member of Grease's gang.
  - Freezer is a large and strong member of Grease's gang.

=== Crew ===
- Ginny McSwain - voice director

== Episodes ==
No.	Title	Directed by	Written by	Original release date
1	"Abbad'Un in a Bottle"	Unknown	Unknown	September 24, 1986
2	"The Case of the Fouled Up Pharaoh"	Unknown	Douglas Booth	October 1, 1986
3	"The Curse of the Silver Dragon"	Unknown	Unknown	October 8, 1986
4	"Follow the Chocolate Cake Road"	Unknown	Unknown	October 15, 1986
5	"The Great Candy Caper"	Unknown	George Arthur Bloom	October 22, 1986
6	"The Grin-Ness Book of Records"	Unknown	Unknown	October 29, 1986
7	"Horse Hide and Seek"	Unknown	Dale Hale	November 5, 1986
8	"Left Foot Forward"	Unknown	J. Brynne Stephens	November 12, 1986
9	"One Potato Zoo Potato"	Unknown	Douglas Booth	November 19, 1986
10	"Pig Out"	Unknown	George Arthur Bloom	November 26, 1986
11	"Poltergeist Potatoes"	Unknown	Douglas Booth	December 3, 1986
12	"Pot of Gold"	Unknown	Unknown	December 10, 1986
13	"Potato Head Pirates"	Unknown	J. Brynne Stephens and Michael Reaves	December 17, 1986
14	"Potatolympics"	Unknown	George Arthur Bloom	December 24, 1986
15	"Puff's New Job"	Unknown	David Schwartz	December 31, 1986
16	"Robin Potato Head"	Unknown	Antoni Zalewski	January 7, 1987
17	"Romancing the Rock"	Unknown	Unknown	January 14, 1987
18	"Sam Spud, Private Eye"	Unknown	Joe Cook	January 21, 1987
19	"A Side Order of Soggy Spuds"	Unknown	Douglas Booth	January 28, 1987
20	"Small Potatoes"	Unknown	David Schwartz	February 4, 1987
21	"Spike Spiked"	Unknown	Unknown	February 11, 1987
22	"Surfin' Potatoes"	Unknown	Rowby Goren	February 18, 1987
23	"The Trash Can Derby"	Unknown	Joe Cook	February 25, 1987

== Reception ==
In 2014, io9 listed it among twelve 1980s cartoons that supposedly did not deserve remembrance, heavily criticizing the basis of the series.
