= MoonDreamers =

- Genre: Adventure; Fantasy; Sci-fi; Musical; Magical girl
- Created by: Jackie Waterman McLoughlin
- Written by: Cynthia Friedlob; John Semper; Betty G. Birney; Evelyn Gabai; Lainy Morriss; Nancy Jane Batchelder; Ellen Guon; Chuck Lorre
- Voices of: Peter Cullen; Jennifer Darling; Elizabeth Lyn Fraser; Melanie Gaffin; Robin Kaufman; Tress MacNeille; Clive Revill; Neil Ross
- Theme music composer: Ford Kinder; Anne Bryant
- Composer: Robert J. Walsh
- Country of origin: United States
- Original language: English
- No. of series: 1
- No. of episodes: 16

Production
- Running time: 11 minutes
- Production companies: Hasbro; Sunbow Productions; Marvel Productions

Original release
- Network: Syndication
- Release: September 25, 1986 – January 8, 1987

MoonDreamers is an American short-lived animated television series that aired in 1986 as part of the My Little Pony 'n Friends lineup.

My Little Pony aired the first 15 minutes. The second half rotated among MoonDreamers, Potato Head Kids and The Glo Friends, all of which promoted toys from Hasbro.

== Plot ==
The Moondreamers are a group of celestial people who create and deliver pleasant dreams to Earth children. Their main enemy is the evil Queen Scowlene who attempts to keep everyone awake at night with her nightmare crystals.

== Characters ==
- Crystal Starr (voiced by Tress MacNeille) is the protagonist of the series, who leads the Moondreamers and designs the stars.
- Whimzee (voiced by B. J. Ward) is a Moondreamer who uses her imagination to create dreams for Dreamcasting.
- Celeste is a Moondreamer whose job is to ride on Galaxia and bring nighttime to Earth so that dreams can begin to be sent out.
  - Galaxia is Celeste's magical space dragon with feather-like wings.
- Sparky Dreamer is a brainy Moondreamer who is often stuck fixing the mistakes of the other Moondreamers.
- Dream Gazer (voiced by Jennifer Darling) is the eldest Moondreamer and is considerably older than the other members and is the wisest. She has a star tattooed over her left eye and has a wistful voice. She stirs all the different ingredients that make dreams into a secret recipe called the imagination combination.
- Bucky Buckaroo (voiced by Adam Carl) is a Moondreamer who takes the dream crystals to the stars on his favourite comet, Halley. In "Bucky's Comet", he is shown to have a crush on Crystal.
- Blinky and Bitsy (voiced by Robin Kaufman and Elizabeth Lyn Fraser) are two little Moondreamers in training and young girls who want to help the Moondreamers, but often get in the way. Blinky is quite outgoing while Bitsy is shown to be very shy.
  - Ursa Major (voiced by Tress MacNeille) is a flying polar bear who is Blinky's companion.
  - Roary (voiced by Neil Ross) is a flying lion who is Bitsy's companion.
- Snoozers are helpers of the Moondreamers:
  - Stardust is the lead Snoozer who sprinkles stardust in the eyes of wide awake children.
  - Dozer is a constantly sleepy Snoozer who quiets the night with his earmuffs.
  - Stumbles is a clumsy Snoozer who silences bumps in the night.
- Frolic is a Starfinder who explores the uncharted universe. He is accompanied by a peacock named Fluffin.
- Stardust is a Starfinder who looks for lonely planets that need stars. He is accompanied by a ram named Hornsby.
- Dawn is a Sunfinder who searches for the sun to start the morning. He is accompanied by a rabbit named Bunnyhop.
- Dusky is a Sunfinder who places the sun at the spot where it is supposed to set. He is accompanied by a dog named Sunscout.
- Sundazzle is a Sunsparkler who polishes the sun.
- Fundreamer is a Sunsparkler who creates happy dreams for children.
- Daystar is a Sunsparkler who supervises every sunny day.
- Cloudpuff is a Sunsparkler who makes the designs of the clouds.
- Ursa Minor (voiced by Melanie Gaffin) is Ursa Major's mischievous niece.

=== Villains ===
- Queen Scowlene (voiced by Tress MacNeille) is the primary antagonist of the series who lives in Monstrous Middle. She is the mother of Scowlette. Scowlene has not slept a wink and has plans to take over Starry Up so that she could keep everyone up at night. In "The Poobah of Pontoon", it is revealed that Scowlene's older brother is the Poobah of Pontoon, making him Scowlette's uncle.
- Princess Scowlette is a daughter of Queen Scowlene, who seems to be about the same age as Whimzee and lives with her mother. She often tries to destroy the Moondreamers in order to impress her mother, though it never works out.
- Professor Grimace (voiced by Clive Revill) is a mad scientist who helps Queen Scowlene with her plans by inventing machines that would go horribly wrong.
  - Igon (voiced by Peter Cullen) is a three-legged troll-like creature who acts as Professor Grimace's lab assistant.
- Sleep Creeps are the minions of Queen Scowlene.
  - Shiner is a Sleep Creep who wakes children with his flashlight.
  - Creaky is a Sleep Creep who fills the night with creaks and groans.
  - Squawker (voiced by Tress MacNeille) is a Sleep Creep who makes loud noises that keep people awake.

== Episodes ==
No.	Title	Directed by	Written by	Original release date
1	"Twinkle, Twinkle, Little Moondreamer Pt. 1"	Unknown	John Semper, Cynthia Friedlob	September 25, 1986
Two Star Children named Blinky and Bitsy want to be Moondreamers, but then Scowlene and her Sleep Creeps attack.
2	"Twinkle, Twinkle, Little Moondreamer Pt. 2"	Unknown	John Semper, Cynthia Friedlob	October 2, 1986
The Moondreamers defeat Scowlene and Blinky and Bitsy earn their place as Moondreamers.
3	"All In a Night's Sleep"	Unknown	Betty Birney	October 9, 1986
Stumbles the Snoozer falls off the Dreamalong Drifter and onto Earth where he uncovers a sinister plot by Queen Scowlene.
4	"The Star of Stars"	Unknown	Astrid Ryterband, John Semper, Cynthia Friedlob	October 16, 1986
The Moondreamers go on a quest to find their original base called the Star of Stars, but Queen Scowlene has taken control of it.
5	"The Poobah of Pontoon"	Unknown	Nancy Jane Batchelder, John Semper, Cynthia Friedlob	October 23, 1986
Queen Scowlene's older brother, the fat Poobah of Pontoon, returns and becomes Monstrous Middle's king. Due to Roary unknowingly stopping the Sleep Creeps earlier, Queen Scowlene and Scowlette plan to have the Poobah of Pontoon take Roary.
6	"The Dreamkin"	Unknown	Ellen Guon, John Semper, Cynthia Friedlob	October 30, 1986
A strange creature called the Dreamkin comes to life and Whimzee is sad to see it go.
7	"Minor Problems"	Unknown	Evelyn Gabai	November 6, 1986
Ursa Minor flies into Sparky Dreamer's new machine and is cloned. Both sides have problems caused by the Ursas.
8	"Igon the Terrible"	Unknown	Bob Smith, Barry O'Brien	November 13, 1986
After being sent on a vacation to the Frightful Forest by Queen Scowlene for accidentally wrecking Professor Grimace's Anti-MoonDreamer Beamer, Igon ends up befriending a giant Gundar named Hebo after saving him from a volcano. As a favor to Hebo, Igon uses him to get revenge on Queen Scowlene and plans to take Starry Up for himself.
9	"Stuck on Bucky"	Unknown	Evelyn Gabai, John Semper, Cynthia Friedlob	November 20, 1986
Sparky and Bucky use Galactic Glue and get stuck on each other. They must work together to foil an evil Scowlette invasion.
10	"The Dreamnapping"	Unknown	Chuck Lorre, John Semper, Cynthia Friedlob	November 27, 1986
A girl gets pulled into a dream by Queen Scowlene.
11	"Bucky's Comet"	Unknown	Betty Birney	December 4, 1986
Bucky wants Crystal Starr to think he is special, so he lassos a comet with Professor Grimace and Igon inside.
12	"Dreamland Express"	Unknown	Mark McClellan, John Semper, Cynthia Friedlob	December 11, 1986
Scowlene kidnaps the Moondreamer children through the use of a magnificent Star Train that runs on Positronic Energy. Ursa and Roary must come to their rescue and find a way for everyone to return safely.
13	"Whimzee, Come Home!"	Unknown	Betty Birney	December 18, 1986
Whimzee is afraid that she lost her imagination, so she goes to a world and battles a imagination demon. Note: This is the only Moondreamers episode that does not feature Queen Scowlene.
14	"Zodies on the Loose"	Unknown	Kathy Selbert, John Semper, Cynthia Friedlob	December 25, 1986
Scowlene sets all the Zodiacs in the Blue Zoo loose, and it is up to Celeste and Galaxia to stop them all.
15	"The Night Mare Pt. 1"	Unknown	Lainy Morriss, John Semper, Cynthia Friedlob	January 1, 1987
When Blinky and Bitsy are looking after a Starhorse named Andromeda at the Blue Zoo, the Starhorse falls into Monstrous Middle. Meanwhile, a horse-hating boy named Timmy falls into there.
16	"The Night Mare Pt. 2"	Unknown	Lainy Morriss, John Semper, Cynthia Friedlob	January 8, 1987
Andromeda transforms into a Night Mare in Monstrous Middle and is captured by Scowlene, and it is up to Timmy, Blinky and Bitsy to save the day; Scowlene says "Timmy would like horses again" as the story ends.

== Cast ==
- Adam Carl - Bucky Buckaroo
- Peter Cullen - Igon
- Jennifer Darling - Dream Gazer
- Elizabeth Lyn Fraser - Bitsy
- Melanie Gaffin - Ursa Minor
- Liz Georges - Additional Voices
- Renae Jacobs - Additional Voices
- Robin Kaufman - Blinky
- Tress MacNeille - Crystal Starr, Queen Scowlene, Squawker and Ursa Major
- Terence McGovern - Additional Voices
- Clive Revill - Professor Grimace
- Neil Ross - Roary
- Ken Sansom - Additional Voices
- Judy Strangis - Additional Voices

== Crew ==
- Ginny McSwain - voice director
- Mason Alan Dinehart - voice director

== Reception ==
In 2014, including it in an article about twelve 1980s cartoons that supposedly did not deserve remembrance, io9 lambasted this short-lived series as an insult for depicting MoonDreamers "intruding children's rooms".

=== Accolades ===
- 1988 Nominee Young Artist Award
  - Best Animation Voice Over Group
  - Elisabeth Fraser ('Bitsy')
  - Melanie Gaffin ('Ursa Minor')
  - Robin Kaufman ('Blinkie')
- 1988 Nominee Young Artist Award
  - Best Animation Series or Special for Family Viewing
