= Laura Dean (actress) =

American actress

Laura Dean (born Laura Francine Deutscher; May 27, 1963) is an American film, television and voice actress who is best known for her role as Lisa, the ballet dancer who gets kicked out of the dance department in the film Fame. She also appeared in the Broadway musical version of Doonesbury and as the mother of the title character in The Who's Tommy. She is also known for the roles of Sophie, Rachel's coworker at Bloomingdale's, in the 3rd and 4th seasons of Friends, of the character Tamara in Princess Gwenevere and the Jewel Riders, and on Christmas in Cartoontown. Since she was 10 years old, she also played the New York City Opera for five years in La bohème, Die tote Stadt and Mefistofele.

== Filmography ==
=== Film ===
Laura Dean film credits
| Year | Title | Role | Note |
|---|---|---|---|
| 1980 | Fame | Lisa Monroe | |
| 1980 | Cannibal Apocalypse | Brunette jogger | aka Cannibals in the Street |
| 1982 | Soup for One | Linda | |
| 1984 | Almost You | Jeannie | |
| 2002 | Chicago | Female ensemble | |

=== Television ===
Laura Dean television credits
| Year | Title | Role | Notes |
|---|---|---|---|
| 1986 | The Equalizer | Terry | Episode: "Counterfire" |
| 1995–1996 | Princess Gwenevere and the Jewel Riders | Tamara (voice) | 25 episodes |
| 1996 | Princess Gwenevere and the Jewel Riders | Fallon (voice) | Episode: "Shadowsong" |
| 1997 | Friends | Sophie | 4 episodes |
