= My Little Pony: The Movie (1986 film) =

1986 film

- Theatrical release poster
- Directed by: Michael Joens
- Written by: George Arthur Bloom
- Based on: My Little Pony by Hasbro (Note: The My Little Pony toyline itself was developed from My Pretty Pony toys, which were created in the 1980s by Bonnie Zacherle, Charles Muenchinger, and Steve D'Aguanno for Hasbro.)
- Produced by: Joe Bacal; Tom Griffin; Michael Joens
- Starring: Danny DeVito; Madeline Kahn; Cloris Leachman; Rhea Perlman; Tony Randall
- Edited by: Mike DePatie
- Music by: Rob Walsh
- Production companies: Hasbro; Sunbow Productions; Marvel Productions
- Distributed by: De Laurentiis Entertainment Group
- Release date: June 6, 1986
- Running time: 87 minutes
- Country: United States
- Language: English
- Budget: $5.5 million
- Box office: $6 million or $2.8 million (North America)

My Little Pony: The Movie is a 1986 American animated musical fantasy film based on the Hasbro toyline My Little Pony. Theatrically released on June 6, 1986, by De Laurentiis Entertainment Group, the film features the voices of Danny DeVito, Madeline Kahn, Cloris Leachman, Rhea Perlman and Tony Randall.

Produced by Sunbow Productions and Marvel Productions, with animation production by Toei Animation in Japan and AKOM in South Korea, the film received negative reviews from critics and was considered a box office bomb but later found success on home video release, the film was succeeded by a television series anthology which ran in late 1986. A ten-part episode from that series, The End of Flutter Valley, served as a sequel to the film. An unrelated film of the same name, based on the television series My Little Pony: Friendship Is Magic, was released in 2017.

== Plot ==
The pony denizens of Dream Castle prepare for a spring festival. Meanwhile, at the Volcano of Gloom, a wicked witch named Hydia sends her two earnest but incompetent daughters, Reeka and Draggle, off to ruin the ponies' festival. During a dance performance, Baby Lickety Split attempts to add her own dance and ruins the whole performance. She is berated by Buttons and runs away, followed by the dragon Spike, only to end up falling down a waterfall and being trapped in a valley. Meanwhile, Reeka and Draggle try to ruin the ponies' festival by flooding the area, but thanks to the Sea Ponies, they end up getting washed away in an overflowing waterfall.

The ponies send out a search party to find Lickety Split and Spike, while Hydia decides to release the Smooze, an unstoppable purple ooze that buries and destroys everything in its path. The Smooze rages towards the Dream Castle, trapping Spike and Lickety Split inside a mountain. All the ponies are forced to evacuate as the castle and the surrounding land are submerged by Smooze. The search party continues its attempt to locate Lickety Split before the Smooze nearly engulfs them. Later, two Pegasus ponies, Wind Whistler and North Star, travel to the human world to fetch Megan, the keeper of the Rainbow of Light, bringing Megan's younger siblings, Danny and Molly, along as well. Megan unleashes the Rainbow of Light upon the Smooze. Following a struggle, the Rainbow of Light is submerged in the Smooze. The ponies are disheartened by this, but Megan offers the encouragement that another rainbow lies out there.

Megan accompanies two ponies on a visit to the Moochick, who gives the trio a new home and a map to find the Flutter Ponies who might stop the Smooze. A group led by Megan sets out to find Flutter Valley, while Spike and Lickety Split run into five ugly but well-meaning creatures called Grundles, whose home, Grundleland, was covered by the Smooze in the past. They escape the Smooze by floating down the river on a log and end up in a clearing by a well. As Lickety Split wallows in self-pity, she hears echoes in the well and rescues Morning Glory, a Flutter Pony who fell in earlier. She is informed of the Smooze and so promises to lead them to Flutter Valley. Meanwhile, Megan's team presses through several dangers until at last they find Flutter Valley and meet with the queen Rosedust, who refuses to get involved at first, until Lickety Split arrives, safe and sound, along with Spike, the Grundles, and Morning Glory.

The other ponies and forest animals are about to be covered by the Smooze as the witches watch from their ship. The Flutter Ponies come to the rescue and destroy the Smooze with their magical wind, Utter Flutter, uncover the Rainbow of Light, and drop the witches back into the volcano with the sticky goo. The Grundles are given the ruins of Dream Castle, all the ponies and Spike who were covered in Smooze are cleaned by the Flutter Ponies' Utter Flutter, and the Rainbow of Light is returned to the ponies. With all problems resolved, the ponies take Megan and her siblings back home.

== Voice cast ==
- Danny DeVito as Grundle King
- Rhea Perlman as Reeka
- Madeline Kahn as Draggle
- Cloris Leachman as Hydia
- Tony Randall as Moochick
- Charlie Adler as Spike and Woodland Creature
- Russi Taylor as Morning Glory, Rosedust, Bushwoolie #5 and Skunk
- Tammy Amerson as Megan
- Jon Bauman as The Smooze
- Sheryl Bernstein as Buttons, Bushwoolie #6 and Woodland Creature
- Susan Blu as Bushwoolie, Grundle and Lofty
- Nancy Cartwright as Gusty and Bushwoolie #4
- Cathy Cavadini as North Star
- Peter Cullen as Ahgg and Grundle
- Laura Dean as Sundance and Bushwoolie #2
- Ellen Gerstell as Magic Star
- Keri Houlihan as Molly
- Katie Leigh as Fizzy and Baby Sundance
- Scott Menville as Danny
- Laurel Page as Sweet Stuff
- Sarah Partridge as Wind Whistler
- Alice Playten as Baby Lickety Split and Bushwoolie #1
- Jill Wayne as Shady and Baby Lofty
- Frank Welker as Bushwoolie #3 and Grundle
- Michael Bell as Grundle

== Music ==
No.	Title	Performer(s)	Length
1.	"My Little Pony Opening Chorus"	Staci Keanan & Chorus
2.	"Evil Witch Like Me"	Cloris Leachman
3.	"I'll Go It Alone"	Alice Playten & Charlie Adler
4.	"I'll Do the Dirty Work"	Madeline Kahn & Rhea Perlman
5.	"Nothing Can Stop the Smooze"	Jon Bauman & Chorus
6.	"There's Always Another Rainbow"	Tammy Amerson
7.	"Home"	Tony Randall
8.	"Grundles Good"	Chorus
9.	"What Good Could Wishing Do?"	Alice Playten & Russi Taylor
10.	"My Little Pony Ending Chorus"

== Production ==
My Little Pony: The Movie was one of the first projects for Nelson Shin's AKOM studio. Amid an emergency rush, Shin and his crew spent ten weeks on the film's 300,000 cels. Japan's Toei Animation also worked on the production.

== Release ==
=== Box office ===
Opening in only 421 theaters on June 6, 1986, My Little Pony: The Movie grossed just under US$6 million in ticket sales at the North American box office. With a US$674,724 gross on its wide debut, it remains one of the weakest on record among major features. Hasbro lost US$10 million on the combined poor performance of this, and their next collaboration with De Laurentiis Entertainment Group (DEG), The Transformers: The Movie. It also forced the producers of these films to make G.I. Joe: The Movie a direct-to-video release instead of theatrical, as well as scrap a Jem movie then in development. However, The Transformers: The Movie was itself later reassessed on VHS, DVD and Blu-ray by viewers, and has over the decades risen to become a popular cult classic.

=== Critical reception ===
As with various other films of the 1980s designed to promote toy lines, My Little Pony: The Movie was widely panned by critics. The New York Times' Nina Darnton, aware of its marketing purposes, added in her review: "Unlike the great Disney classics, there is nothing in this film that will move young audiences, and there are very few bones of wit thrown to the poor parents who will have to sit through the film with children of this age group." Movie historian Leonard Maltin seemed to agree, calling the picture "...A good concept hampered by poor animation; too 'cute' for anybody over the age of 7." According to Halliwell's Film Guide, My Little Pony came off as an "immensely distended cartoon meant to plug a fashionable line of children's dolls." Metacritic gives the film a score of 23 out of 100, based on reviews from 4 critics, indicating "Generally Unfavorable" reviews.

== Home media ==
In the United States, the film was released on VHS and Beta by Vestron Video in late October 1986. Its Laserdisc was released in mid-1988.

The film was released on DVD in the United Kingdom in 2003 by Prism Leisure. The first DVD release in the United States was released in late 2006 by Rhino Entertainment; musical moments from the film were used as its only extras. The film was later re-released on January 27, 2015 by Shout! Factory.

A home media bundling both this film and the namesake 2017 film was released on October 16, 2018, commemorating the 35th anniversary of the My Little Pony toyline. The releases contain the same bonus features as its DVD/Blu-ray counterparts.

== Legacy ==
An episode of My Little Pony: Friendship Is Magic from its fifth season, "Make New Friends but Keep Discord", features a version of the Smooze, a creature that originally appeared in the film. In the episode, Discord brings the creature into the Grand Galloping Gala to separate Fluttershy from her new friend, Tree Hugger. The Smooze is noticeably different than how it appears in the film: for example, it is green instead of purple.

== See also ==
- List of films about horses
