= My Little Pony (TV series) =

American children's animated television series

- Genre: Fantasy
- Based on: My Little Pony toyline by Bonnie Zacherle
- Directed by: Bob Bemiller; Charlie Downs; Bob Kirk; Margaret Nichols; Bob Matz; Rudy Cataldi; Karen Peterson; Joe Morrison; Spencer Peel; Neal Warner; Lillian Evans; Stan Phillips; Norman McCabe; Gerry Chiniquy; Warren Batchelder; Bob Treat; Brad Case; Joan Case; John Freeman; Tom Ray; Bill Knoll; Milton Gray
- Creative director: Jay Bacal
- Voices of: Bettina Bush; Scott Menville; Keri Houlihan; Susan Blu; Katie Leigh; Sherry Lynn; Nancy Cartwright; Ellen Gerstell
- Theme music composer: Anne Bryant; Ford Kinder
- Composer: Robert J. Walsh
- Country of origin: United States
- Original language: English
- No. of seasons: 2
- No. of episodes: 65

Production
- Executive producers: Joe Bacal; David H. DePatie; Margaret Loesch; Tom Griffin
- Producers: Mike Joens; Jeff Hall; Roger Slifer
- Running time: 10 minutes
- Production companies: Sunbow Productions; Marvel Productions

Original release
- Network: Syndication
- Release: September 15, 1986 – September 25, 1987

Related
- My Little Pony Tales; My Little Pony: Friendship Is Magic; My Little Pony: Pony Life; My Little Pony: Make Your Mark

My Little Pony is an American animated series produced by Sunbow Productions and Marvel Productions and animated by Toei Animation and AKOM based on the My Little Pony toys released by Hasbro. The series featured as the first segment of a program called My Little Pony 'n Friends. The second segment would be an unrelated cartoon based on another Hasbro franchise – including The Glo Friends, MoonDreamers and the Potato Head Kids. The series debuted on September 15, 1986, three months after the release of My Little Pony: The Movie (which had introduced the Paradise Estate and many of the series' main characters), and ended on September 25, 1987. Two previous television specials were edited into segments of My Little Pony 'n Friends: Rescue at Midnight Castle and Escape from Catrina. The complete series of My Little Pony segments has been released on DVD in Regions 1 and 4. Other sections have been released on DVD, such as My Little Pony: The Glo Friends, as of 2026.

== Synopsis ==
Ponyland is a mystical land, home to all kinds of magical creatures. The Little Ponies make their home in Paradise Estate, living a peaceful life filled with song and games. However, not all of the creatures of Ponyland are so peaceful, and the Ponies often find themselves having to fight for survival against witches, trolls, goblins and all the other beasts that would love to see the Little Ponies destroyed, enslaved or otherwise harmed.

== Cast ==
- Bettina Bush as Megan (Note: Although Megan's surname, Williams, appears in the writer's guide for My Little Pony 'n Friends, it has never been used in the series itself.)
- Charlie Adler as Spike
- Susan Blu as Buttons, Paradise
- Nancy Cartwright as Gusty, Baby Heart Throb, Baby Cuddles, Posey, Truly, Honeysuckle, Surf Rider
- Jeannie Elias as Whizzer, Masquerade, Baby Lickety-Split, Magic Star, Sweet Stuff, Sun Shower
- Ellen Gerstell as Lofty, Locket, Mimic, Scoops
- Skip Hinnant as narrator
- Keri Houlihan as Molly
- Katie Leigh as Fizzy, Heart Throb, Lickety-Split, Ribbon, Baby Shady, Baby Gusty, Baby Tiddley-Winks, Water Lily
- Sherry Lynn as Galaxy, Gingerbread, Cherries Jubilee, Baby Half-Note, Baby Ribbon, Baby Sundance
- Scott Menville as Danny
- Sarah Partridge as Wind Whistler
- Russi Taylor as Cupcake, Rosedust, Morning Glory
- B. J. Ward as Surprise, North Star, Peach Blossom, Forget-Me-Not
- Jill Wayne as Baby Lofty, Shady

Additional voices by Michael Bell, Joey Camen, Melanie Gaffin, Tress MacNeille, and Frank Welker

== Broadcast ==
=== International ===
In the UK, the animated series first aired on November 7, 1987 on MTV. In Russia, a dubbed version in Russian was released on the channel 2x2 from 1993-1995.

== Characters ==
- Earth Ponies are like normal horses, but brightly colored as many creatures in Ponyland are.
- Pegasus Ponies are agile winged horses who can fly in the skies of Ponyland and even go beyond the rainbow to our world.
- Unicorn Ponies possess a single horn on their forehead; all are able to 'wink in' and 'wink out' (short range teleport) and possess a unique individual ability (e.g. telepathy, telekinesis, aerokinesis, hydrokinesis, and intuition).
- Flutter Ponies are shy but powerful creatures with magic in their gossamer wings, granting them flight as well as various undefined abilities. They live in an area of Ponyland known as Flutter Valley.
- Sea Ponies are brightly colored seahorse-like creatures who dwell in the rivers and lakes of Ponyland.
- The Bushwoolies, a joyful species of furballs with a hive mind mentality, causing them to usually think alike and in agreement. They seem to be led by a blue Bushwoolie named Hugster.
- The Furbobs, cousins of the Bushwoolies. They primarily walk on four legs as opposed to Bushwoolies who seem to walk on the equivalent of two legs. Unlike the Bushwoolies, they constantly disagree with each other. Any agreement between them usually signals an emergency situation.
- Stonebacks, ferocious looking armadillo-like creatures. They were enemies of the Furbobs until Megan helped the Furbobs realize that the two species can overcome their hostilities through friendship and understanding.
- The Grundles, a small race of creatures ruled by the Grundle King. They used to live in Grundleland before it was smoozed (in My Little Pony: The Movie); they now live in Dream Castle.
- Three human children, siblings Megan, Danny, and Molly, often fly across the Rainbow to join the Little Ponies.
- The characters often seek advice on magical matters from the Moochick, a wise but eccentric gnome who lives in the nearby Mushromp with his rabbit assistant, Habbit.

== Episodes ==
Although the directors for the series are credited, they did not receive episodic credit. For most of these episodes, it is unclear whether the episodes the directors actually directed, aside from the specials which have their separate credits.

However, some of the staff, namely the storyboard artists, were documented in having their episodes known, seen here.

=== My Little Pony 'n Friends, Season 1 (1986) ===
No.	Title	Directed by	Written by	Storyboarded by	Original release date
1 2 3 4 5 6 7 8 9 10	"The End of Flutter Valley" (Parts 1–10)	Unknown	George Arthur Bloom	Wendell Washer & Bob Kline	September 15, 1986
1 2 3 4 5 6 7 8 9 10	"The End of Flutter Valley" (Parts 1–10)	Unknown	George Arthur Bloom	Wendell Washer & Bob Kline	September 16, 1986
1 2 3 4 5 6 7 8 9 10	"The End of Flutter Valley" (Parts 1–10)	Unknown	George Arthur Bloom	Wendell Washer & Bob Kline	September 17, 1986
1 2 3 4 5 6 7 8 9 10	"The End of Flutter Valley" (Parts 1–10)	Unknown	George Arthur Bloom	Wendell Washer & Bob Kline	September 18, 1986
1 2 3 4 5 6 7 8 9 10	"The End of Flutter Valley" (Parts 1–10)	Unknown	George Arthur Bloom	Wendell Washer & Bob Kline	September 19, 1986
1 2 3 4 5 6 7 8 9 10	"The End of Flutter Valley" (Parts 1–10)	Unknown	George Arthur Bloom	Wendell Washer & Bob Kline	September 22, 1986
1 2 3 4 5 6 7 8 9 10	"The End of Flutter Valley" (Parts 1–10)	Unknown	George Arthur Bloom	Wendell Washer & Bob Kline	September 23, 1986
1 2 3 4 5 6 7 8 9 10	"The End of Flutter Valley" (Parts 1–10)	Unknown	George Arthur Bloom	Wendell Washer & Bob Kline	September 24, 1986
1 2 3 4 5 6 7 8 9 10	"The End of Flutter Valley" (Parts 1–10)	Unknown	George Arthur Bloom	Wendell Washer & Bob Kline	September 25, 1986
1 2 3 4 5 6 7 8 9 10	"The End of Flutter Valley" (Parts 1–10)	Unknown	George Arthur Bloom	Wendell Washer & Bob Kline	September 26, 1986
Sequel to My Little Pony: The Movie. The ponies are on their way to Flutter Valley for the "Sun Tuesday" celebration with the Flutter ponies. Meanwhile, the witches from the Volcano of Gloom are busy hatching a plan to destroy Flutter Valley and the ponies, allying with an army of giant bees to get their revenge on the Flutter ponies. The bees steal the precious Sun Stone, and if the Flutter ponies can't get it back, their home will be destroyed.
11 12 13 14	"The Ghost of Paradise Estate" (Parts 1–4)	Unknown	George Arthur Bloom	Wendell Washer	September 29, 1986
11 12 13 14	"The Ghost of Paradise Estate" (Parts 1–4)	Unknown	George Arthur Bloom	Wendell Washer	September 30, 1986
11 12 13 14	"The Ghost of Paradise Estate" (Parts 1–4)	Unknown	George Arthur Bloom	Wendell Washer	October 1, 1986
11 12 13 14	"The Ghost of Paradise Estate" (Parts 1–4)	Unknown	George Arthur Bloom	Wendell Washer	October 2, 1986
A ghost comes to Paradise Estate to scare the ponies. However, when it flies away, it becomes tangled in a tree, convincing Megan that it is not really a ghost. She introduces herself as Pluma, a shape-shifting bird. She tells them about a creature who lived in Dream Valley before the Paradise Estate was built and is planning to destroy the ponies' home. Megan and the others decide to help Pluma recover the Flashstone, and save her grandfather.
15	"The Great Rainbow Caper"	Unknown	Diane Duane	TBA	October 3, 1986
A pair of monkeys called Gizmonks take Danny and Surprise prisoner until Megan turns over the Rainbow of Light to them.
16 17 18 19	"The Glass Princess" (Parts 1–4)	Unknown	Tracy Mann Hill & Michael Charles Hill	TBA	October 6, 1986
16 17 18 19	"The Glass Princess" (Parts 1–4)	Unknown	Tracy Mann Hill & Michael Charles Hill	TBA	October 7, 1986
16 17 18 19	"The Glass Princess" (Parts 1–4)	Unknown	Tracy Mann Hill & Michael Charles Hill	TBA	October 8, 1986
16 17 18 19	"The Glass Princess" (Parts 1–4)	Unknown	Tracy Mann Hill & Michael Charles Hill	TBA	October 9, 1986
A self-obsessed witch named Porcina wants to turn the world into glass, to see her reflection everywhere. Three ponies, captured by a trio of Raptorians, are the key to Porcina's plan, and Megan and her friends must stop her using their own magic to destroy their friends. Meanwhile, Shady makes many accusations against herself. After the first run of Part 4, the song "Hurry" was removed, and the episode got slowed so that it would maintain its length. The scene with the song does not appear on any VHS or DVD release of this story.
20	"Pony Puppy"	Unknown	Carla Joseph Conway & Gerry Conway	TBA	October 10, 1986
The ponies find a giant puppy and decide to keep her, build her a doghouse, and name her Dinah. When the new puppy is reunited with her family the following spring, the ponies are sad to see her go, but they realize that even though friends come and go they will never leave their hearts.
21 22 23 24	"Bright Lights" (Parts 1–4)	Unknown	Barbara Petty	TBA	October 13, 1986
21 22 23 24	"Bright Lights" (Parts 1–4)	Unknown	Barbara Petty	TBA	October 14, 1986
21 22 23 24	"Bright Lights" (Parts 1–4)	Unknown	Barbara Petty	TBA	October 15, 1986
21 22 23 24	"Bright Lights" (Parts 1–4)	Unknown	Barbara Petty	TBA	October 16, 1986
The baby ponies are delighted when rock star Knight Shade performs for them – but the concert is a front to steal their shadows and feed his dark master.
25	"Sweet Stuff and the Treasure Hunt"	Unknown	Cherie Wilkerson	TBA	October 17, 1986
Sweet Stuff wants to play games with everyone else, but feels left out because she is an earth pony and doesn't seem to be good at anything. She ends up surprising everyone (even herself) when she joins a treasure hunt with the pegasi and is the only one able to answer the last riddle and win the game.
26 27 28 29	"The Return of Tambelon" (Parts 1–4)	Unknown	Michael Reaves	Wendell Washer	October 20, 1986
26 27 28 29	"The Return of Tambelon" (Parts 1–4)	Unknown	Michael Reaves	Wendell Washer	October 21, 1986
26 27 28 29	"The Return of Tambelon" (Parts 1–4)	Unknown	Michael Reaves	Wendell Washer	October 22, 1986
26 27 28 29	"The Return of Tambelon" (Parts 1–4)	Unknown	Michael Reaves	Wendell Washer	October 23, 1986
The ancient city of Tambelon, the Realm of Darkness, disappeared 500 years ago. Now, it returns to Dream Valley and all of the unicorns mysteriously vanish.
30	"Little Piece of Magic"	Unknown	Beth Bornstein	TBA	October 24, 1986
The baby ponies are bored and want Ribbon and Buttons to play a game with them. Ribbon suggests that they play a game of make believe and runs out to go get them a red ball to use in their game. She explains that the red ball is magical and can be anything they want it to be. While she's gone, they take turns imagining what the red ball will be like.
31 32 33 34	"The Magic Coins" (Parts 1–4)	Unknown	Michael Reaves	TBA	October 27, 1986
31 32 33 34	"The Magic Coins" (Parts 1–4)	Unknown	Michael Reaves	TBA	October 28, 1986
31 32 33 34	"The Magic Coins" (Parts 1–4)	Unknown	Michael Reaves	TBA	October 29, 1986
31 32 33 34	"The Magic Coins" (Parts 1–4)	Unknown	Michael Reaves	TBA	October 30, 1986
The ponies are delighted to discover a treasure chest of magic coins. However, Baby Lickety Split wishes for it to stop raining, causing a drought to spread all over Ponyland.
35	"Mish Mash Melee"	Unknown	Bruce Faulk	TBA	October 31, 1986
After a magical mishap, Fizzy, Shady, Wind Whistler, and Gusty must live each other's lives until they can restore the balance of nature.
36 37	"Woe Is Me" (Parts 1 & 2)	Unknown	Gordon Kent	TBA	November 3, 1986
36 37	"Woe Is Me" (Parts 1 & 2)	Unknown	Gordon Kent	TBA	November 4, 1986
The ponies provide shelter to Woebegone, a wandering hobo who brings bad luck and disaster wherever he goes.
38 39	"Fugitive Flowers" (Parts 1 & 2)	Unknown	Martin Pasko & Rebecca Parr	TBA	November 5, 1986
38 39	"Fugitive Flowers" (Parts 1 & 2)	Unknown	Martin Pasko & Rebecca Parr	TBA	November 6, 1986
Posey finds some sentient flowers wandering around her garden and offers them shelter and water, but she has no idea what they have in store for her to repay her kindness. After the Flouries have taken Masquerade hostage, they are on their way to sucking the life out of Dream Valley unless the ponies can stop them.
40	"Would Be Dragonslayer"	Unknown	Carla Joseph Conway & Gerry Conway	Wendell Washer	November 7, 1986
Spike is harassed by a young boy trying to become a knight. The ponies help the boy to find a good deed that doesn't involve slaying their friend.
41 42	"Baby, It's Cold Outside" (Parts 1 & 2)	Unknown	Gordon Kent	Wendell Washer	November 10, 1986
41 42	"Baby, It's Cold Outside" (Parts 1 & 2)	Unknown	Gordon Kent	Wendell Washer	November 11, 1986
The ponies are delighted as snow falls in summer, not realizing that it's a plot by the Penguin King to freeze Ponyland and destroy those that can't survive the cold.
43 44	"Crunch the Rockdog" (Parts 1 & 2)	Unknown	Linda Woolverton	TBA	November 12, 1986
43 44	"Crunch the Rockdog" (Parts 1 & 2)	Unknown	Linda Woolverton	TBA	November 13, 1986
A vicious dog carved from rock charges through Ponyland, turning everything it encounters to stone. Meanwhile, Wind Whistler gets her heart stomped on for being too analytical and not showing her emotions.
45 46	"The Revolt of Paradise Estate" (Parts 1 & 2)	Unknown	David Wise	TBA	November 14, 1986
45 46	"The Revolt of Paradise Estate" (Parts 1 & 2)	Unknown	David Wise	TBA	November 17, 1986
A magic spell brings the Paradise Estate to life, and its furniture declares war on the ponies.
47 48	"Through the Door" (Parts 1 & 2)	Unknown	David Wise	TBA	November 18, 1986
47 48	"Through the Door" (Parts 1 & 2)	Unknown	David Wise	TBA	November 19, 1986
A door is opened to the world of fairy tales, and the ponies meet legends such as Robin Hood, Aladdin's genie, and Hercules.
49 50	"Rescue at Midnight Castle" (Parts 1 & 2)	Gerry Chiniquy, Milton Gray, Tom Ray & Nelson Shin	George Arthur Bloom	Bob Kline, Lonnie Lloyd, Don Sheppard & Wendell Washer	November 20, 1986
49 50	"Rescue at Midnight Castle" (Parts 1 & 2)	Gerry Chiniquy, Milton Gray, Tom Ray & Nelson Shin	George Arthur Bloom	Bob Kline, Lonnie Lloyd, Don Sheppard & Wendell Washer	November 21, 1986
The first My Little Pony TV special from 1984, shortened and retitled "Escape from Midnight Castle".

=== My Little Pony 'n Friends, Season 2 (1987) ===
No.	Title	Directed by	Written by	Storyboarded by	Original release date
51 52 53 54	"The Quest of the Princess Ponies" (Parts 1–4)	Unknown	Michael Reaves	Wendell Washer	September 7, 1987
51 52 53 54	"The Quest of the Princess Ponies" (Parts 1–4)	Unknown	Michael Reaves	Wendell Washer	September 8, 1987
51 52 53 54	"The Quest of the Princess Ponies" (Parts 1–4)	Unknown	Michael Reaves	Wendell Washer	September 9, 1987
51 52 53 54	"The Quest of the Princess Ponies" (Parts 1–4)	Unknown	Michael Reaves	Wendell Washer	September 10, 1987
Lavan, a lava demon, kidnaps the princess ponies and steals their magic wands. As Lavan grows in power, Ponyland's magic is thrown into chaos. Can he be stopped before everything is destroyed?
55	"Spike's Search"	Unknown	Michael Charles Hill	TBA	September 11, 1987
Spike goes in search of his roots and joins a dragon horde, but finds he doesn't agree with their bullying ways.
56 57	"The Golden Horseshoes" (Parts 1 & 2)	Unknown	Carla Joseph Conway & Gerry Conway	TBA	September 14, 1987
56 57	"The Golden Horseshoes" (Parts 1 & 2)	Unknown	Carla Joseph Conway & Gerry Conway	TBA	September 15, 1987
When Mimic becomes afflicted with a mysterious illness, Megan and the ponies embark on a series of odd adventures to find the four golden horseshoes with the power to heal the ailing unicorn.
58 59	"Flight to Cloud Castle" (Parts 1 & 2)	Unknown	Michael Reaves	TBA	September 16, 1987
58 59	"Flight to Cloud Castle" (Parts 1 & 2)	Unknown	Michael Reaves	TBA	September 17, 1987
Heart Throb, Locket, and Twilight help a young elf called Garf rescue his true love Ariel from an enchanted castle, while facing many dangers on the way.
60	"The Ice Cream Wars"	Unknown	David Wise	TBA	September 18, 1987
The First Tooth baby ponies are put in charge of the Newborn Twins: Sniffles & Snookums and Milkweed & Tumbleweed. The unruly twins are temporarily subdued with the promise of ice cream, but first the First Tooth baby ponies must reunite the feuding ice cream makers Rocky Ripple and Fudgy McSwain, who have cut off Ponyland's ice cream supply.
61 62	"Somnambula" (Parts 1 & 2)	Unknown	David Wise	Wendell Washer	September 21, 1987
61 62	"Somnambula" (Parts 1 & 2)	Unknown	David Wise	Wendell Washer	September 22, 1987
The ponies prepare a surprise Welcome Home party for the Big Brother ponies who have been racing around the world. However, before the Big Brothers arrive, an old witch named Somnambula puts the adult ponies into a trance, then forces them to play in a circus as she drains the youth from them. The Big Brothers set out to rescue the ponies.
63	"The Prince and the Ponies"	Unknown	David Wise	Wendell Washer	September 23, 1987
The ponies come to the aid of two wronged royals when they attend an exclusive party at the Palace de Branforr. Meanwhile, the First Tooth Baby Ponies learn to be careful what they wish for.
64 65	"Escape from Katrina" (Parts 1 & 2)	Gerry Chiniquy, Jeff Hale, Terry Lennon, Norman McCabe & Tom Ray	George Arthur Bloom	Robert Dranko, Holly Forsyth, Mike Joens, Bob Kline & Don Sheppard	September 24, 1987
64 65	"Escape from Katrina" (Parts 1 & 2)	Gerry Chiniquy, Jeff Hale, Terry Lennon, Norman McCabe & Tom Ray	George Arthur Bloom	Robert Dranko, Holly Forsyth, Mike Joens, Bob Kline & Don Sheppard	September 25, 1987
The second My Little Pony TV special from 1985, shortened and retitled. A sorceress has grown dependent on witch weed potion and has enslaved dozens of bushwoolies to produce it for her. When she kidnaps a baby pony, Megan and the ponies have to confront her.

== Home media ==
=== UK VHS releases ===
- St. Michael (Marks and Spencer), Tempo Video (MSD Video, Tempo Super Video Then: Tempo Kids Club) (1987–1993)

UK VHS releases
VHS title	VHS Studios	Release date	Episodes	Notes
My Little Pony – The Magic Coins	St. Michael (Marks and Spencer)	1987	The Magic Coins, The Would Be Dragonslayer, Spike's Search	
My Little Pony – The Quest of the Princess Ponies and The Prince and the Pony	Tempo Video (MSD Video)	1987	The Quest of the Princess Ponies, The Prince and the Ponies	
My Little Pony - The Great Rainbow Caper	Tempo Video (MSD Video)	1988	The Great Rainbow Caper, Somnambula, The Revolt of Paradise Estate	
My Little Pony & Other Friends	Tempo Video (MSD Video)	1988	My Little Pony - Flight To Cloud Castle, The Charmkins, MoonDreamers - Stuck On Bucky, The Glo Friends - The Forest Brigade	
My Little Pony - Bright Lights	Tempo Video (MSD Video)	1988	Bright Lights, The Ice Cream Wars	
My Little Pony - The Would Be Dragonslayer & Spike's Search	Tempo Video (MSD Video)	September 19, 1988	Would Be Dragonslayer, Spike's Search	This Video Also Contains Advertising 3 My Little Pony Toys Commercials, 3 Dolls and Toys Commercials, Promo: Spot's First Video, The Shoe People, MoonDreamers, Little Clowns of Happytown, My Little Pony And My Little Pony & Other Friends, Jem, Sparky's Magic Piano and Tempo tape cassettes
My Little Pony - The Return Of Tambelon	Tempo Video (MSD Video)	1989	The Return Of Tambelon, Sweet Stuff and the Treasure Hunt, Pony Puppy	A My Little Pony "Crimp and Curl" Hair Salon Toy Commercials, My Little Pony Competitions: My Little Pony
