= Starcatcher =

Starcatcher may refer to:

- certain characters in the 2004 Peter Pan prequel Peter and the Starcatchers
  - (also in the stage adaptation Peter and the Starcatcher)
- Star Catcher, a My Little Pony character/toy introduced in 2004
- Star Catcher, thoroughbred racehorse
- Starcatcher, the Transformers character/toy introduced in 2007
- Starcatcher (album), a studio album by American rock band Greta Van Fleet
