= List of mainline My Little Pony ponies =

The My Little Pony franchise debuted in 1982, as the creation of American illustrator and designer Bonnie Zacherle. Together with sculptor Charles Muenchinger and manager Steve D'Aguanno, Zacherle submitted a design patent in August 1981 for "an ornamental design for a toy animal". She was then working for Hasbro. The patent was granted in August 1983.

== Main pony line ==
=== Earth ponies ===
Name	Gender	Body color	Hair color	Eye color	Cutie mark	Debut year	Animation debut	Voice actor	Generation(s)
Applejack	Female	Orange (Generation 1, Generation 4), Dark Orange (Generation 3)	Yellow-blonde (Generation 1, Generation 4), Green with yellow streak in mane (Generation 3)	Green	Five red apples (Generation 1), Red apple in diamond (Generation 3), 3 apples (Generation 4)	1984 (Generation 1), 2005 (Generation 3), 2010 (Generation 4)	Rescue From Midnight Castle (Generation 1), Friends Are Never Far Away (Generation 3), Friendship Is Magic (Generation 4)	Ashleigh Ball (G4)	1, 3, 4
Baby Cotton Candy	Female	Pink	Dark pink	Pink	Four white dots	1985	Escape From Catrina	None	1
Baby Cuddles	Female	Light blue	Dark pink	Green	Dark pink rattle	1986	My Little Pony	Nancy Cartwright	1
Baby Fifi	Female	Navy blue	White with pink streak in mane	Blue	3 pink poodles	1987	My Little Pony	None	1
Baby Half Note	Female	Pink	Turquoise	Turquoise	Pair of ballet shoes	1986	My Little Pony	Sherry Lynn	1
Baby Lickety-Split	Female	Light purple	Pinkish purple	Blue	3 orange ice cream cones with white ice cream	1986	My Little Pony: The Movie	Alice Playten	1
Baby Quackers	Female	White	Pinkish Red, Yellow, Green, and Blue	Purple	Yellow duck with red umbrella	1987	My Little Pony	None	1
Baby Shady	Female	Pink (My Little Pony: The Movie, Generation 1), Red (1896 TV Series, Generation 1)	Yellow chartreuse	Green	5 glasses	1986	My Little Pony: The Movie	Katie Leigh	1
Baby Sundance	Female	White	Pink	Blue	Circle of pink hearts, dots and triangles	1986	My Little Pony: The Movie	None	1
Baby Tic Tac Toe	Female	Yellow	Red, Pink, Light green, and Dark green	Blue	Grille	1987	My Little Pony	None	1
Baby Tiddley-Winks	Female	Pink	Light pink	Blue	White flounce	1986	My Little Pony	Katie Leigh	1
Blossom	Female	Lavender	Purple	Purple	White flowers	1982	None	None	1
Blue Belle	Female	Blue	Purple	Periwinkle	Periwinkle stars	1982	None	None	1
Bon Bon	Female	Yellow	Purple	Purple	Blue candy	1992	My Little Pony Tales	Chiara Zanni	1
Bowtie	Female	Blue (Generation 1), White (Generation 3)	Pink (Generation 1), Red, Purple, and Blue (Generation 3)	Pink (Generation 1), Purple (Generation 3)	Five pink bows (Generation 1), Red, purple and blue bowties (Generation 3)	1984 (Generation 1), 2004 (Generation 3)	Rescue From Midnight Castle (Generation 1), Dancing in the Clouds (Generation 3)	None	1, 3
Bright Eyes	Female	Light blue	Orange	Pink	Pink notebook with a pen	1992	My Little Pony Tales	Laura Harris	1
Bubbles	Female	Yellow	Blue	Blue	3 blue and 2 green bubbles	1984	Rescue From Midnight Castle	None	1
Cheerilee	Female	Purple (as a unicorn, Generation 3), Dark Pink (Generation 3), Magenta (Generation 4)	Pink (as a unicorn, Generation 3), Purple, pink and light pink (Generation 3), Pink and light pink (Generation 4)	Green	Three pink flowers (as a unicorn, Generation 3), Pink flowers (Generation 3), Three smile flowers (Generation 4)	2006 (as a unicorn, Generation 3), 2008 (Generation 3), 2011 (Generation 4)	Crystal Princess: The Runaway Rainbow (as a unicorn, Generation 3), Meet the Ponies (Generation 3), Friendship Is Magic	Tracey Moore (as a unicorn, Generation 3), Kelly Sheridan (Generation 3), Nicole Oliver (Generation 4)	3, 3.5, 4
Cherries Jubilee	Female	Light orange	Orange	Green	5 orange cherries	1986	My Little Pony	Jeannie Elias	1
Clover	Female	Light purple	Light pink	Pink	Four leaf clover	1992	My Little Pony Tales	Lalainia Lindbjerg	1
Cotton Candy	Female	Pink (Generation 1), Dark pink (Generation 3)	Dark pink (Generation 1), Blue, light pink, and white (Generation 3)	Purple (Generation 1), Blue (Generation 3)	Five white spots (Generation 1), White cotton candy on green stick (Generation 3)	1984 (Generation 1), 2003 (Generation 3)	Rescue From Midnight Castle (Generation 1), A Charming Birthday (Generation 3)	Laura Dean (Generation 1), Kelly Sheridan (Generation 3)	1, 3
Cupcake	Female	White (Generation 1), Pink (Generation 3.5)	Turquoise (Generation 1), Yellow (Generation 3.5)	Pink (Generation 1), Blue (Generation 3.5)	5 cupcakes (Generation 1), Three cupcakes on blue background (Generation 3.5)	1986 (Generation 1), 2009 (Generation 3.5)	My Little Pony (Generation 1), Twinkle Wish Adventure (Generation 3.5)	Russi Taylor (G1)	1, 3.5
Daffidazey	Female	White	Pink, orange, yellow, blue and purple	Blue	Pink flower	2006	The Princess Promenade	Ellen Kennedy	3
Ember	Female	Purple	Pink	Blue	None	1984	Rescue From Midnight Castle	None	1
Gingerbread	Female	White	Blue, Black, Pink, and Purple	Blue	5 blue gingerbread men	1986	My Little Pony: The Movie	Katie Leigh	1
Kimono	Female	Lilac	Deep purple	Yellow and green	Two yellow Japanese lanterns	2003	A Charming Birthday	Kathleen Barr	3
Lickety-Split	Female (Generation 1), Male (Generation 4)	Light Purple (Generation 1), Brown (Generation 4)	Pink (Escape from Catrina, Generation 1), Light Pink (1986 TV Series, Generation 1), White (Generation 4)	Purple (Generation 1), Blue (Generation 4)	Four pink ice cream cones with white ice cream (Escape from Catrina, Generation 1), Six orange ice cream cones with brown ice cream (1986 TV Series, Generation 1), Ice cream in a bowl (Generation 4)	1985 (Generation 1), 2011 (Generation 4)	Escape From Catrina (Generation 1), Secret of My Excess (Generation 4)	Katie Leigh (Generation 1)	1, 4
Magic Star	Female	Yellow	Green	Purple	Magic wand	1986	My Little Pony: The Movie	Ellen Gerstell (My Little Pony: The Movie, Generation 1), Jeannie Elias (1986 TV Series, Generation 1)	1
Melody	Female	Pink	Blue	Blue	Yellow microphone surrounded by blue stars and music notes	1992	My Little Pony Tales	Kelly Sheridan	1
Minty	Female	Mint green (Generation 3), Green (Generation 4)	Pink, light pink (Generation 3), Pink and white (Generation 4)	Pink and purple (Generation 3), Pink (Generation 4)	Three green and pink-striped mint candies (Generation 3), Three mints (Generation 4)	2003 (Generation 3), 2019 (Generation 4)	A Charming Birthday (Generation 3), Sundae, Sundae, Sundae (Generation 4)	Tabitha St. Germain (Generation 3)	3, 4
Patch	Female	Peach	Pink	Yellow	Pink patch	1992	My Little Pony Tales	Venus Terzo, Brigitta Dau	1
Peachy Pie	Female	Light orange (Generation 3), Light brilliant gold (Generation 4)	White, orange and light orange (Generation 3), Light brilliant tangelo and amber (Generation 4)	Green	Peach (Generation 3), Peaches (Generation 4)	2005 (Generation 3), 2011 (Generation 4)	A Very Minty Christmas (Generation 3), Friendship Is Magic (Generation 4)	None	3, 4
Pinkie Pie	Female	Light pink	Pale pink (Generation 3), Dark pink (Generation 4)	Light blue	Two blue balloons and one yellow balloon (Generations 3 and 4), Yellow balloon (Generation 4.5)	2003 (Generation 3), 2010 (Generation 4), 2020 (Generation 4.5)	A Charming Birthday (Generation 3), Friendship Is Magic (Generation 4), Pony Life (Generation 4.5)	Janyse Jaud (Generation 3), Andrea Libman (Generations 4 and 4.5), Shannon Chan-Kent (Generation 4)	3, 3.5, 4, 4.5
Posey	Female	Yellow	Pink	Green	5 pink tulips	1985	Escape From Catrina	Nancy Cartwright	1
Princess Primrose	Female	Pink	Blue mane and red tail	Yellow	Purple and blue X-shaped flounce	1987	My Little Pony	None	1
Princess Royal Blue	Female	Blue	Red	Pink	Red and white crescent moon-shaped flounce	1987	My Little Pony	None	1
Princess Serena	Female	Light blue	Pale pink	Pink	Pink and white heart-shaped flounce	1987	My Little Pony	None	1
Princess Sparkle	Female	Purple	Turquoise	Turquoise	Blue, yellow and red star-shaped flounce	1987	My Little Pony	None	1
Princess Starburst	Female	Yellow	Purple	Pink	Purple and yellow star-shaped flounce	1987	My Little Pony	None	1
Salty	Male	Light blue	Pink with red streak in mane	Yellow	Boat	1987	My Little Pony	None	1
Scoops	Female	White	Purple	Purple	Three pink shades	1987	My Little Pony	Ellen Gerstell	1
Score	Male	Blue	Blue with white streak in mane	Brown	American football	1987	My Little Pony	None	1
Shady	Female	Pink	Chartreuse	Green	5 glasses	1986	My Little Pony: The Movie	Jill Wayne	1
Skywishes	Female	Pink	Deep pink and purple	Green	Green kite and orange butterfly	2004	Dancing in the Clouds	None	3
Slugger	Male	Brown	White with pink streak in mane	Brown	Baseball glove and bat	1987	My Little Pony	None	1
Sparkleworks	Female	Orange	Dark pink	Blue	Fireworks	2003	A Charming Birthday	Venus Terzo	3
Starlight	Female	Pink	Yellow	Blue	Large yellow star with trail of smaller blue stars and dots	1992	My Little Pony Tales	Willow Johnson	1
Steamer	Male	Pink	White with blue streak in mane	Yellow	Train	1987	My Little Pony	None	1
Sundance	Female	White	Pink (Escape from Catrina, Generation 1), Red (1986 TV Series, Generation 1)	Blue	Pattern of pink hearts, dots and triangles (Escape from Catrina, Generation 1), Pattern of red hearts, dots and triangles (1986 TV Series, Generation 1)	1985	Escape from Catrina	Laura Dean	1
Sunny Daze	Female	White	Yellow, pink, orange and purple	Purple	Orange and pink sun with purple swirls	2003	A Charming Birthday	Adrienne Carter	3
Sweet Stuff	Female	Pale Blue	Red, Purple, Shades of Pink, and White	Purple twinkle eyes	3 pink and 3 purple muffins	1986	My Little Pony: The Movie	Laurel Page (My Little Pony: The Movie, Generation 1), Jeannie Elias (1896 TV Series, Generation 1)	1
Sweetberry	Female	Dark pink	Purple and green	Blue	Two strawberries and white flower	2003	A Charming Birthday	Kathleen Barr	3
Sweetheart	Female	White	Pink	Pink	Large pink heart surrounded by three smaller orange hearts	1992	My Little Pony Tales	Maggie Blue O'Hara	1
Tex	Male	Orange	Dark orange with blue streak in mane	Blue	Green cacti	1987	My Little Pony	Rob Paulsen	1
Tink-a-Tink-a-Too	Female	Purple	Blue, pink and purple	Blue	Two blue bells tied with pink ribbon	2006	Pinkie Pie and the Lady Bug Jamboree	Kelly Sheridan	3
Trucker	Male	Light purple	Dark blue with white streak in mane	Yellow	Truck	1987	My Little Pony	Charlie Adler	1
Truly	Female	White	Dark pink	Green	Green dove and red hearts	1986	My Little Pony	Nancy Cartwright	1

=== Pegasus ponies ===
Pegasus ponies all have wings, and demonstrate great speed both in the air and on foot. Some are described to be graceful. They are seen manipulating the weather in several occasions such as moving clouds to either cause a storm or clear the skies. They are known to live in a magical island known as Butterfly Island in Generation 3 and in city of clouds, known as Cloudsdale, in Generation 4.

Name	Gender	Body color	Hair color	Eye color	Cutie mark	Debut year	Animation debut	Voice actor	Generation(s)
Baby Bouncy	Female	Yellow	Blue	Blue	Beach ball	1987	My Little Pony (1986 TV series)	Russi Taylor	1
Baby Bouncy is one of the first tooth ponies, in charge of taking care of the twins Baby Snookums and Sniffles, and Baby Milkweed and Tumbleweed. She, along with the other baby ponies, has one tooth, and was involved in a feud against Fudgey McSwain and Rocky Ripple.
Bow Hothoof	Male	Periwinkle	Rainbow colors	Amber	Rainbow with a white cloud on the end and gray horseshoe on front	2017	"Parental Glideance"	Jason Deline	4
Bow Hothoof is Rainbow Dash's father whom Scootaloo first meets when she enters Cloudsdale using a giant slingshot. Like his wife, he is an enthusiastic fan of his daughter, but was never made aware from her that she became a Wonderbolt, due to the potential embarrassment that would ensue.
Blossomforth	Female	White	Deep pink (Generation 3, as an Earth pony); Pink and green (Generation 4, as a Pegasus)	Blue	Three blue flowers with pink centers (Generation 3, as an Earth pony); Pink flower (Generation 4, as a Pegasus)	2004 (Generation 3, Earth pony); 2011 (Generation 4, Pegasus)	My Little Pony (Generation 3); Friendship Is Magic (Generation 4)	Kathleen Barr (G3); Kelly Metzger (G4)	3, 4
Blossomforth is a Pegasus Pony, who debuted in Generation 3 as an Earth pony. She was released in 2004 alongside the Dance Jamboree set, presumed to be one of Twinkle Twirl's students in the Dancing in the Clouds short. Her Generation 4 counterpart, a Pegasus Pony, was released in the Generation 4 toyline and subsequently debuted in the second season of My Little Pony: Friendship is Magic.
Brightglow	Female	Orange with yellow wings	Pink and purple (toy version); Pink (animation)	Blue	Two white doves	1991 (as an Earth pony)	My Little Pony Tales	None	1
Brightglow is one of the Glow 'N Show Ponies. Starlight and her friends think they're UFOs until Patch and Bon Bon meet them up close. They repair the damage to the balloon and send Patch and Bon Bon on their way but not before Brightglow warns Patch to use caution on her adventures.
Bulk Biceps	Male	White	Dark blond	Red	Dumbbell	2013	Friendship Is Magic	Jayson Thiessen (debut); Michael Dobson ("Rainbow Falls")	4
Bulk Biceps is a pony whose wings are too small to fly but simply controlled by his muscles. His hooves also match the color of his mane and tail. His catchphrase is shouting "YEAH". His first appearance is in the episode "Hurricane Fluttershy" where he helps create a tornado to gather water for Cloudsdale. He appears as a wonderbolt cadet in the episode "Wonderbolts Academy". He was a member of the Ponyville relay team in "Rainbow Falls" and "Equestria Games". He is shown to work at the Ponyville Spa in "Castle Sweet Castle" where he gives Spike a painful massage. He has a major speaking role in the episode "On Your Marks".
Cloudchaser	Female	Light Purple	Light Blue with White highlights	Light Rose	Shooting Star (sometimes a Cloud in front of the Sun)	2012	Friendship Is Magic	Cathy Weseluck (Season 2); Ashleigh Ball (Season 3)	4
Cloudchaser is a Pegasus Pony from Cloudsdale and is Flitter's older twin sister. She first appeared in "Hurricane Fluttershy". She also appears as a cadet at the Wonderbolts Academy.
Cloud Climber	Female	White	Purple	Navy Blue	Pink Butterfly	2005	My Little Pony G3 specials	Kathleen Barr	3
Cloud Climber is one of the Pegasus Ponies in Butterfly Island and one of Star Catcher's close friends. She likes to soar higher into the sky and can also jump over a rainbow. She is also very skilled in flying.
Coconut Grove	Female	Pink	Dark purple and green (mane) dark purple (tail)	Green	Coconut and flowers	2005	My Little Pony G3 specials	Kelly Sheridan	3
Coconut Grove is one of the Pegasus Ponies in Butterfly Island and one of Star Catcher's close friends. She is very brave and is much more determined than the other Pegasus Ponies.
Cozy Glow	Female	Pink	Coral pink	Cyan	Red chess rook piece	2018	Marks for Effort	Sunni Westbrook	4
Cozy Glow was initially a supporting character in the beginning of season 8 and now the main antagonist in its finale. She was first met by the Cutie Mark Crusaders who helped her finish her homework easily. Cozy kept on doing good things until she became addicted to power taking away magic from Equestria which makes things worse.
Daring Do/A.K. Yearling	Female	Yellow-Brown	Grayscale Rainbow	Magenta	Compass rose	2012	Friendship Is Magic	Chiara Zanni	4
Daring Do is the main character of her book series. When Rainbow Dash injures her wing, she reads Daring Do and the Sapphire Stone, in which she too has a broken wing from crash landing in the jungle. She is possibly based on Indiana Jones and Lara Croft. Like Rainbow Dash, Daring-Do is adventurous. In the episode Daring Don't, she is revealed to be real, and the alter ego of the supposed author, A.K. Yearling.
Derpy/Muffins	Female	Grey	Yellow	Gold	Two bubbles with five smaller bubbles	2010	Friendship Is Magic	Tabitha St. Germain	4
Derpy is a pegasus pony with grey body, gold eyes and a yellow mane and tail. who became famous among the show's internet following due to having a googly-eyed expression in the first episode. Unnamed at the time, the fans nicknamed her "Derpy" after the common term for her expression, "derp". Starting with "Feeling Pinkie Keen", the show's crew began giving the pony crossed eyes intentionally to give her the "derp" expression, as a nod to the fans. Beginning in Season 2, the crew internally adopted the name "Derpy" and began specifically placing her in scenes, rather than having her remain an arbitrary background pony, as a "Where's Waldo"-type challenge for the fans. She received a spoken appearance in the episode "The Last Roundup", with Rainbow Dash referring to her by her fan-given name. In her current appearance, Derpy is a clumsy, cheerful, goofball; always willing to help, usually getting in the way, and generally terrifically accident prone. She causes some damage to property due to her clumsiness. In Equestria Girls, Derpy makes some sporadic appearances, including at the end credits when she holds a muffin. In Rainbow Rocks, she plays the musical saw with her friends as a competitor in the high school Battle of the Bands. Additionally, her hairstyle in the latter film was changed to be more closer to her pony counterpart.
Featherweight	Male	Light Yellowish Gray	Brown	Brown	a single Feather	2012	Friendship Is Magic	Richard Ian Cox	4
Featherweight is a Pegasus Pony foal, first seen in the episode Ponyville Confidential where he is revealed to have newly earned his cutie mark. The Cutie Mark Crusaders are upset with this, wondering how he could get his cutie mark before they did. He later shows up in the meeting for the school's newspaper staff. He dashes out of the meeting to "document everything" as a photographer, after Diamond Tiara, who is the new Editor-in-chief for the school newspaper, orders him to do so. Later on, he helps Sweetie Belle and the other Cutie Mark Crusaders by taking a photo of Snips and Snails who managed to entangle themselves in gum and stick themselves to one another, which is later used in the school newspaper. When "Gabby Gums", that is, the Cutie Mark Crusaders, say they are going to quit their job with the school newspaper, Diamond Tiara shows them embarrassing pictures of themselves, taken by Featherweight in his efforts to "document everything." Featherweight becomes the Editor-in-chief of the Foal Free Press, the school newspaper, after Diamond Tiara has her position revoked by Cheerilee.
Firefly	Female	Pink	Blue	Purple	Blue Lightning Bolts	1983	Rescue From Midnight Castle	Sandy Duncan	1
Firefly is a daredevil and one of the main characters of Rescue From Midnight Castle. She loves to race across the sky, moving gracefully from cloud to cloud, she dances on her graceful hooves and sails on the wind. She often chases the rain and searches among the clouds for the pony's special friend, the rainbow. Lauren Faust stated that her personality is the basis for the Friendship is Magic incarnation of Rainbow Dash.
Flash Sentry	Male	Yellow	Blue	Blue	Two-tone sapphire blue shield behind a yellow lightning bolt	2013	Equestria Girls	Vincent Tong	4
Flash Sentry is a pegasus Royal Guard who appeared in Friendship Is Magic and Equestria Girls. He was shown to be kind, gentle, and benevolent. He first appeared as a new member of the guards, and introduces Twilight Sparkle (addressing her as "princess") to the rest of the princesses, for Twilight's first princess summit, after she bumps into him. Like several ponies in Equestria, when Twilight Sparkle entered through the magic mirror and transformed to a human, she met his human counterpart when she bumps into him (which is the running gag of the movie.) Throughout the movie, Flash helped Twilight get her crown when his ex-girlfriend, Sunset Shimmer stole it for the Princess of the Fall Formal prize. At his human counterpart, it shown that Flash is a rocker in a band. It also revealed that he has a crush on Twilight Sparkle as both human and pony counterpart. His human counterpart made another appearance in "Rainbow Rocks" when he first asks Twilight's human friends, the Rainbooms, if Twilight will return for the showcase and becomes saddened when Applejack says she won't return anytime soon. He, like most of the school, becomes hypnotized by the Dazzlings spell and becomes over-competivie when the showcase becomes a competition and yells at Twilight and claims they aren't friends. Flash and his band are shown to beat two other bands in the competition making it to the semi-finals, until they are eliminated by the Dazzlings themselves. After the Rainbooms beat the Dazzlings in the finals and their spell is broken, Flash returns to his old self, and pulls Twilight into a hug. In Friendship is Magic, his pony version appeared in episode 11 of the fourth season, traveling with Princess Cadance. He also appears in the beginning of episode 25 of the same season, introducing the Duke and Duchess of Mareitonia at the Crystal Empire.
Fleetfoot	Female	Aqua blue	White with baby blue streaks	Green (in the comic book), purple (in the TV series)	Blue horseshoe with a yellow flame curve	2012	Friendship Is Magic	Andrea Libman	4
Fleetfoot is one of the members of the Wonderbolts. She won the Wonderbolts race in the episode called "Sweet and Elite". She reappeared in season 4 as a member of the Cloudsdale team for the Equestria Games in the episodes "Rainbow Falls" and "Equestria Games".
Flitter	Female	Pale purple	Cyan with darker highlights	Pale light raspberry	Three blue and white dragonflies (the number sometimes changes)	2012	Friendship Is Magic	Cathy Weseluck	4
Flitter is a Pegasus Pony from Cloudsdale, and also Cloudchaser's younger twin sister. She first appeared alongside her twin in "Hurricane Fluttershy"; and she is one of the Pegasi who help make the hurricane.
Fluttershy	Female	Yellow	Light pink	Dark cyan-green	Three butterflies	2004 (Generation 3); 2010 (Generation 4)	Friendship Is Magic	Andrea Libman (all episodes and Equestria Girls); Blu Mankuma (S1E9); Alvin Sanders (S4E14 (speaking)); Marcus Mosley (S4E14 (singing))	3, 4
Fluttershy is a shy pegasus pony with a yellow body, dark cyan-green eyes and a light pink mane and tail, with a high-pitched, squeaky voice who was originally an Earth pony. She was first released in 2003 as part of the Rainbow Celebration Ponies. In the G3 series, she loves to take pictures of her friends and have fun and is fond of window shopping at all the sweet boutiques in Ponyville. In Friendship is Magic, she receives a design change, making her into a Pegasus Pony. She is sweet and good-natured, but is timid and shy around others, though she is big-hearted enough to stand up for other ponies when they are in trouble. Fluttershy has a great love and care for animals and is willing to help them at any cost. Although she is a pegasus, she prefers the ground to the sky. She fell from the sky when Rainbow Dash challenged her bullies to a race, and she came to know of the animals living on the ground, thus marking her beginning as the animal caretaker. She lives in a cottage near the Everfree forest instead of in the clouds with the other pegasi, due to her fear of heights. She has an ability known as "The Stare," which assists her in disciplining misbehaving animals. In 'Suited for Success', Fluttershy was shown to be knowledgeable on certain stitching techniques when Rarity makes her gala dress. According to the Cutie Mark Chronicles, she was saved by a group of butterflies after falling from Cloudsdale. Rainbow Dash's Sonic Rainboom scared the animals Fluttershy befriended and after consoling them, she earned her cutie mark. Fluttershy's elemental spirit is Kindness.
Happyglow	Female	Orange (toy version); Light pink with pink wings (animation)	Blue and white	Purple	Three blue clown hats	1991 (as an Earth pony)	My Little Pony Tales	N/A	1
Happyglow is one of the Glow 'N Show Ponies. Starlight and her friends think they're UFOs until Patch and Bon Bon meet them up close.
Heart Throb/Baby Heart Throb	Female	Pink	Dark pink	Blue	Hearts with little wings	1985	My Little Pony (1986 TV series)	Katie Leigh	1
For Heart Throb, every day is Valentine's Day. She makes heart-shaped presents for everyone and spreads joyous messages of love and happiness to all who live on the far side of the rainbow. She has a daughter named Baby Heart Throb, who dreams of singing on stage with Knight Shade.
Honolu-Loo	Female	White	Pink, Yellow and Orange	Green	Butterfly with 2 flowers	2005	My Little Pony G3 specials		3
Honolu-Loo (referred as Baby Honolu-Loo in the toys) is the only baby Pegasus Pony in Butterfly Island. Honolu-Loo speaks with a Hawaiian accent and she is usually clumsy when it comes to flying.
Island Delight	Female	Purple	Blue	Blue	3D Blue shell with pink heart and five white flowers	2005	My Little Pony G3 specials	Kathleen Barr	3
Island Delight is one of the Pegasus Ponies in Butterfly Island and one of Star Catcher's close friends. She glides gracefully through the air, wondering what lies just beyond the horizon.
Lightning Dust	Female	Turquoise	Amber with blond highlights	Amber	Lightning bolt with three stars	2012	Friendship Is Magic	Britt Irvin	4
Lightning Dust is introduced in the Friendship is Magic episode "Wonderbolts Academy" as one of many pegasi at the Wonderbolts' training camp. While she forges a friendly relationship with Rainbow Dash due to their love of speed, Lightning Dust is shown to be a reckless flyer with no concern for the safety of others. This eventually leads to a conflict with Rainbow Dash and gets her stripped of her position as lead pony. She later appears as the leader of a stunt team named The Washouts, composed of unsuccessful Wonderbolt candidates like herself.
Locket	Female	Pink	White, pink, orange and purple	Purple	Two pink keys and one purple key	1985	My Little Pony (1986 TV series)	Ellen Gerstell	1
Locket likes to fly very fast and alongside Twilight (Pegasus), they both venture into the Cloud Castle.
Lofty	Female	Pale yellow	Orange	Brown	Pink hot air balloon surrounded by red stars	1985	My Little Pony: The Movie (original appearance); My Little Pony (1986 TV series) (series appearance)	Lofty; Susan Blu (Movie); Ellen Gerstell (Series); Baby Lofty; Susan Blu (Movie); Jill Wayne (Series)	1
An explorer pony, Lofty loves exploring the mountains and she can fly higher than any other pony in Ponyland. Her daughter is Baby Lofty, who is clumsy and dreams of mastering flight.
Masquerade	Female	Yellow	Dark green, aqua, light green and chartreuse	Green	Blue and pink masks	1986	My Little Pony (1986 TV series)	Jeannie Elias	1
Masquerade is the only Tomboy Pegasus Pony in the Paradise Estates. She is a master of disguise, and also very brave and seems intuitive about dangerous situations. She appears in 'The Ghost Of Paradise Estate', 'Sweetstuff And The Treasure Hunt', 'The Magic Coins', 'Woe Is Me', 'Fugitive Flowers', 'Would-Be Dragonslayer', and cameoed in 'The Return Of Tambeleon.' She also had several notable comic appearances.
Medley	Female	Green	Dark green	Blue	Green music notes	1983	Rescue From Midnight Castle	Sandy Duncan	1
Medley is a Pegasus Pony who accompanies Firefly. Unlike Firefly, Medley is calmer than her counterpart.
Night Glider	Female	Navy blue	Light blue with lighter streak	Sky blue	Crescent moon surrounded with clouds (regained)	2015	The Cutie Map	Rebecca Shoichet	4
Night Glider is a pegasus pony with a navy blue body, sky-blue eyes and a light blue mane and tail with a lighter streak, who appears as one of an important group of four ponies in The Cutie Map.
North Star/Baby North Star	Female	Pink	Purple	Blue	Cardinal directions	1985	My Little Pony: The Movie (original appearance); My Little Pony (1986 TV series) (series appearance)	North Star; Cathy Cavadini (Movie); B. J. Ward (Series); Baby North Star; Robbie Lee	1
North Star is an explorer Pegasus Pony with a strong British accent. She has a good sense of direction, though she can be easily frazzled. She has a daughter named Baby North Star, who is one of the first tooth ponies, in charge of taking care of the twins Baby Snookums and Sniffles and Baby Milkweed and Tumbleweed. Like the other baby ponies, she has one tooth and was involved in a feud against Fudgey McSwain and Rocky Ripple.
Paradise	Female	White	Red	Green	Two green palm trees and an orange crescent moon	1985	My Little Pony (1986 TV series)	Susan Blu	1
Paradise is a lover of legends and lore and a storyteller for the Baby Ponies.
Pipp Petals	Female	Pink	Purple	Green	A musical note with the top shaped like a crown, with a crown inside it	2021	My Little Pony: A New Generation	Sofia Carson	5
Princess Pipp Petals is one of the main characters of A New Generation. She is one of the two pegasus princesses of Zephyr Heights, as well as a singer and a big social media icon. She and the other royal pegasi are apparently the only pegasi who can fly, but during a big royal event where she sings, this is accidentally revealed to be fake. As she escapes the city with her sister, Zipp, and the rest of the main characters, she joins their quest to restore flight to the pegasi to repair her reputation. In My Little Pony: Make Your Mark, she opens a salon in Maretime Bay named Mane Melody.
Pound Cake	Male	white	Brown	Dark brown	N/A	2012	Friendship Is Magic	Tabitha St. Germain	4
Pound Cake is one half of Carrot Cake and Cup Cake's newborn twins. Pound Cake is unusually strong, able to break out of a turned over play pen. This could also explain why he can already fly, despite older foals not being able to. His bad habit is that he likes to hit and pound on things.
Princess Tiffany	Female	White	White	Blue	Silver teardrop-shaped medallion with a green jewel	1986	My Little Pony (1986 TV series)	Kath Soucie	1
Princess Tiffany is the leader of the Princess Ponies. Alongside the other Princess Ponies, Princess Tiffany lives near the Heart of Ponyland on a remote island. They use their wands to maintain the balance of Ponyland's magic, until it was stolen by Lavan, the Lava Demon, forcing her to get Megan in Dream Valley to stand up against him. She usually has feuds with the other Princess Ponies on who should be queen, until they settled their differences and work together. Princess Tiffany's wand allows her to drive away the clouds.
Queen Haven	Female	Lavender	Light purple	Pale blue	A crown above purple wings	2021	My Little Pony: A New Generation	Jane Krakowski	5
Queen Haven is the queen of the pegasus kingdom of Zephyr Heights, and mother to Princesses Pipp and Zipp. She insists on keeping up the facade that the royal family is the only group of pegasi who are still able to fly, giving a sense of hope to her subjects. Sunny Starscout, Izzy Moonbow, and Zipp, in an effort to restore magic, seek to find the Pegasus Crystal, which is the centerpiece of Queen Haven's crown, and she never takes it off. During Pipp's live performance where the Pegasus Crystal is successfully obtained, the fake flying is accidentally exposed, and the pegasi overthrow and arrest Queen Haven, while Pipp and Zipp flee Zephyr Heights with the other protagonists. Queen Haven manages to escape, and during the final confrontation, she manages to save the unicorn Alphabittle from Sprout's war machine. In the end, she, as the leader of the pegasi, joins with the earth ponies and unicorns and finally brings ponykind together again.
Rainbow Dash	Female	Light blue	Rainbow-colored	Deep pink	Rainbow colored lightning bolt with cloud	2003 (Generation 3); 2010 (Generation 4)	A Charming Birthday	Venus Terzo (A Charming Birthday to A Very Pony Place); Anna Cummer (Meet the Ponies to Twinkle Wish Adventure); Brooke Fennel (Once upon a My Little Pony Time); Ashleigh Ball (Friendship is Magic to Equestria Girls)	3, 4
Rainbow Dash is a pegasus pony with a light blue body, deep pink eyes and a rainbow-colored mane and tail, who debuted in 2003, as an Earth pony. In Generation 3, she was described as a stylish pony who likes rainbows and speaks with British accent. She always adds the word "darling" into her speech. She has been rereleased many times in the new uniform pose as part of the Core 7. In the Core 7 series, she has curly hair, and her mane was bound in a ponytail. She is again described as a fashionable pony who always dresses in style. Sometimes a shopaholic, she always adds the word "Dashing" into her speeches, and her British accent was dropped. In the new and current series, her voice sounds a little more tomboyish and her rainbow symbol in the same series changes shape from an arc to a lightning bolt shooting out of a cloud with another subtracted. She is very brave and bold, but also mischievous and proud, as well as sometimes being insensitive. She has great speed and works with the other Pegasus Ponies to move clouds around the sky and adjust the weather. Her lifelong dream is to join the Wonderbolts, Equestria's aerobatic flight team, which is fulfilled in the rest of the series. Rainbow Dash's signature move is the Sonic Rainboom, in which she flies fast enough to break the sound barrier, creating a sonic boom and a rainbow-hued shock wave at the same time. It is revealed that when she did this move for the first time, she earned her cutie mark and set in motion a chain of events that allowed the other five main characters to earn theirs as well. Rainbow Dash's elemental spirit is Loyalty.
Royal Pegasus Guards	Male (Generation 4); Various (Generation 5)	White (Celestia's); Gray (Luna's); Copper (one); Light brown (another); Green (third); Various (Queen Haven's)	Light sapphire blue and light phthalo blue (Celestia's); Deep blue and very deep blue (Luna's); Turquoise (others); Various (Queen Haven's)	Blue (Celestia's and single addition); Yellow (Luna's); Red (single addition) purple (another single addition); Various (Queen Haven's)	Green Knight chess piece (Thunder)	2010 (Celestia's); 2011 (Luna's); 2015 (additional)	Friendship Is Magic	Jayson Thiessen (Celestia's Royal Pegasus guards, Canterlot Archives guard)	4, 5
The Royal Guards are a group of loyal ponies who serve both Princess Celestia and Princess Luna, primarily pegasi and unicorns. Celestia's Pegasus guards first appeared in the first episode, as a pair of the more commonly seen white coated Pegasus guards chauffeur Twilight Sparkle and Spike from Canterlot to Ponyville in a flying chariot. They make their first speaking appearance in A Bird in the Hoof, where they guard Sugarcube Corner, where Celestia is staying. Other royal guards appear throughout the series, including some female guards for the first time in Season 8. Luna's Pegasus guards first appeared in the season 2 episode "Luna Eclipsed", chauffeuring her flying carriage to Ponyville. They have a dark gray coat, black tails, tufts of hair on the tips of their ears, bat-like wings, and cat-like slit pupils. Their armor is purple, and it has a webbed crest over the helm. They resemble Celestia's guards, except have a much darker look about them.
Scootaloo	Female	Orange	purple-pink	Purple	Red, pink, and purple shield with wing and lightning bolt in the center	2005 (Generation 3); 2011 (Generation 4)	Meet the Ponies	Tabitha St. Germain (Meet the Ponies to Twinkle Wish Adventure); Rachel Chrystie (Once upon a My Little Pony Time); Madeleine Peters (Friendship is Magic and Equestria Girls)	3, 4
Scootaloo is a filly pegasus pony with an orange body, purple eyes and a purple-pink mane and tail. who first appeared in Generation 3 series as an Earth pony. She later became part of the Core 7 in 2008 along with her sister Cheerilee. She loves playing games and sports but argues with Cheerilee in some situations. In Friendship is Magic, she is a young Pegasus Pony and is one of Apple Bloom's friends, who formed the group named the "Cutie Mark Crusaders". She is a bit of a tomboy, and is bold and impulsive, not afraid to speak her mind and argue or fight if necessary. Although she cannot fly, she can use her tiny wings to give her extra propulsion when riding a scooter and help her perform amazing stunts, she has tried to fly once, but failed because she is bottom heavy. She has a talent for activities that require agility, such as stunt driving, dancing, and choreography. She idolizes Rainbow Dash, another pegasus pony.
Skydancer	Female	Yellow	Red, light yellow, green and blue	Red	Green birds	1984	"Escape From Catrina"	Jeannie Elias	1
Skydancer is a Pegasus Pony who carries Megan to Dream Valley for the second time. She also loves to fly very fast.
Soarin'	Male	Light blue	Slate blue	Green	Yellow lightning bolt with blue crest behind it	2010	Friendship Is Magic	Matt Hill	4
Soarin' is a member of the wonderbolts, Equestria's aerial flight team. He first appeared during the early episodes of the series and then in Sonic Rainboom during the Best Young Flyer Competition. He appears again during the Grand Galloping Gala alongside Spitfire, recognizes Rainbow Dash again during the event, and is Applejack's only customer that night, buying an apple pie from her. He is named after Amy Keating Rogers's son, Soren mixed with the word soaring.
Somnambula	Female	Light red	Teal	Lavender		2017	Daring Done?	Murry Peeters	4
Somnumbula is a pegasus pony with an Egyptian accent, and one of the six Pillars of ancient Equestria. Long ago, she saved a village from a sphinx and rescued Prince Hisan by solving the sphinx's riddle, and by crossing a bridge while blindfolded. She represents the Element of Hope. After appearing in the present time, she becomes a motivational speaker in the town which was named after her.
Spitfire	Female	Yellow	Fire orange with a light orange streak	Brown	Stylized phoenix	2011	Friendship Is Magic	Nicole Oliver (first appearance); Kelly Metzger (all other appearances)	4
Spitfire is the leader of the Wonderbolts, Equestria's aerial flight team. She acknowledged Rainbow Dash during the Best Young Flyer Competition for saving her and two other members after Rarity knocked them out. She appears again during the Grand Galloping Gala alongside Soarin' and recognizes Rainbow Dash again during the event. She is named after the Supermarine Spitfire.
Star Catcher	Female	White	Blue, white and pink	Blue	Pink heart with glitter	2004	My Little Pony G3 specials	Lenore Zann	3
Star Catcher was first released in 2004 as part of the G3 line, and has since been discontinued. She was released again in 2007 as a single decorating pony. Star Catcher is the first Pegasus Pony in the Generation 3 Line and is described in Ponyville Legends to grant everyone's wish. She lives in Butterfly Island, a place where all Pegasus Ponies live and she loves to make friends with everyone she meets, especially to Skywishes.
Starglow	Female	Green (toy version); Dark blue with blue wings (animation)	Pink and yellow (toy version); Red and yellow (animation)	Pink (toy version); Green (animation)	Orange piano	1991 (as an Earth pony)	My Little Pony Tales	N/A	1
Starglow is one of the Glow 'N Show Ponies. Starlight and her friends think they're UFOs until Patch and Bon Bon meet them up close.
Starsong	Female	Purple	Various shades of pink	Blue	Large white and pink star surrounded by other smaller stars (G3) a big star with a musical note (G4)	2008 (G3) 2013 (G4)	Meet the Ponies	Chantal Strand	3,4
Starsong is a Pegasus Pony and a member of the Core 7 Ponies. Unlike other Pegasus Ponies, Starsong has small, gossamer-like sparkling wings that allow her to fly. She also loves singing and dancing, although she could come off as shy and is slightly timid about performing on stage. She is brave but sometimes she can't stand up for herself on some situations and is a bit too fearful, which leads to her friends to encourage her.
Stellar Eclipse	Male	Light brown	Black with purple highlights	Purple	Pink and purple sun-like compass	2014	Friendship Is Magic	Sylvain LeVasseur Portelance	4
Stellar Eclipse is a crippled pony with wheels set aside his back hooves. Rainbow Dash tries to ask him to continue the trade, but he refuses because of his hunger.
Stormy Flare	Female	Yellow	Dark orange with lighter streaks	Red-orange	Flying phoenix	2015	Rarity Investigates	Sidika Larbes	4
Stormy Flare is Spitfire's mother. She wears a purple sweater and a white pearl necklace with matching earrings. She apparently was sick, sending Spitfire to find an Ice Iris to cure her, but she showed up to a Wonderbolts practice without any problem, kicking off the mystery of who lied about it.
Surprise/Baby Surprise	Female	White	Neon yellow (toy version); Light green (animation)	Purple	Purple balloons	1984	My Little Pony (1986 TV series)	B. J. Ward (My Little Pony TV series); Claire Corlett (FiM)	1, 4
Surprise is a mischievous sort. She is loud and hyper and often shouts her own name when doing the unexpected. Lauren Faust stated that her personality and her cutie mark is the basis for the Friendship is Magic incarnation of Pinkie Pie. Recently, she has been shown to be a Wonderbolt.
Thistle Whistle	Female	Baby blue	Impale pink and yellow	Green	Purple thistle flowers and a butterfly	2005	Friends are Never Far Away	Tabitha St. Germain	3
Thistle Whistle is a pegasus pony who was first released in 2005 as a Sunny Scent Pony, scented like coconut. She was re-released in 2007 alongside Sing and Dance Pinkie Pie and Sew-and-So. She later debuted in the third Generation 3 special Friends are Never Far Away. Like her namesake, Thistle Whistle always whistles in one of her speeches.
Thunder Flap	Male	Light Green	Green	Purple	A dark green knight from chess	2021	My Little Pony: A New Generation	Arturo Hernandez	5
Thunder Flap is one of two prominent royal guards at Zephyr heights serving Queen Haven. The less experienced of the two, his demeanor is much less serious than his counterpart, Zoom, willing to chat with the captured Sunny and Izzy, and tends to be a bit nervous.
Twilight (Pegasus)	Female	Purple	Light pink	Pink	White candle with yellow flame and candle holder	1985	My Little Pony (1986 TV series)	Noelle North	1
Twilight is a Pegasus Pony who, alongside Locket, ventures into the Cloud Castle.
Whizzer	Female	Pink	Red, blue, green (sometimes chartreuse) and white	Turquoise	Dark pink propeller beanies	1986	My Little Pony (1986 TV series)	Jeannie Elias	1
Whizzer is Ponyland's fastest flier, and its fastest speaker (though only sometimes). She's very dependable, but also very hasty on her actions. She appears in "The Great Rainbow Caper", "The Glass Princess", "Sweetstuff and the Treasure Hunt", "The Return Of Tambeleon", "The Magic Coins", "Fugitive Flowers", "The Golden Horseshoes", and is mentioned in "Bright Lights." She also appears in a few comics, in the most notable of which she goes on a mission with Locket into outer space.
Wind Rider	Male	Light blue	Streaks of gray	Goldenrod	Winged pilot helmet	2015	"Rarity Investigates"	Jan Rabson	4
Wind Rider is a senior stallion and a member of the Wonderbolts. When mentioned that Rainbow Dash, only a Wonderbolt reserve, is close to breaking his flight record, he secretly frames Rainbow Dash for Spitfire's mysterious disappearance, which would have gotten her kicked out of the group. Rarity, however, solves the mystery.
Wind Whistler	Female	Light blue	Fading pink	Purple	White and blue whistles	1986	My Little Pony: The Movie	Sarah Partridge	1
Wind Whistler is erudite, smart and logical. Others sometimes find her confusing or think her cold-hearted due to her bad habit of being a bit of a downer.
Windy	Female	Magenta							
Windy is one of the Pegasus ponies living in Maretime Bay. In My Little Pony: Make Your Mark, she wins the trophy in the sandcastle competition, but her flying drives Posey to declare she has an unfair advantage.
Windy Whistles	Female	Light blue	Light scarlet and orange	Cerise	White cloud with wind gust	2017	"Parental Glideance"	Sarah Edmondson	4
Windy Whistles is Rainbow Dash's mother whom Scootaloo first meets when she enters Cloudsdale by a giant slingshot force. Like her husband, she is an enthusiastic supporter of her daughter, but was not told that she became a Wonderbolt, due to the embarrassment that would follow.
Zipp Storm	Female	White	Magenta and Cyan	Blue	A magenta and cyan lightning bolt with a crown on top	2021	My Little Pony: A New Generation	Liza Koshy	5
Princess Zipp Storm, full name Zephyrina Storm, is one of the main characters of A New Generation. She is one of the two pegasus princesses of Zephyr Heights. Despite the other royal pegasi pretending to be the only pegasi who can fly, Zipp resents having to live this lie, and instead studies what happened to the ponies' flight in secret. As the elder sister, she is next in line for the throne but shows a reluctance to it and doesn't like attention. When the royal pegasi are exposed as liars, she escapes the city with her sister, Pipp, and the rest of the main characters, and she joins their quest to restore flight to the pegasi. Her interests include athletics and science. In My Little Pony: Make Your Mark, she shows skills at being a detective.
Zipporwhill	Female	Cream	Dirty blond	Turquoise	Three paw prints	2014	Friendship Is Magic	Tabitha St. Germain	4
Zipporwhill is a pegasus filly who wears a silver tiara and black eyeglasses. She has a puppy dog as her pet.
Zoom Zephyrwing	Female	Light Blue	Purple	Purple	A purple rook from chess	2021	My Little Pony: A New Generation	G.M. Berrow	5
Zoom Zephyrwing is one of two prominent royal guards at Zephyr heights serving Queen Haven. The more experienced of the two, her style is more serious and in line than that of her counterpart, Thunder.

=== Unicorn ponies ===
Unicorn ponies are ponies who have a single horn protruding from their forehead, which glows when their powers are used. While they each possess individualized/different magical capabilities, all unicorns share the ability to teleport in a process referred to as "winking". Their teleportation is limited to their line of sight, and can only be performed through open air; any physical obstruction will prevent them from moving through it. Despite being associated with their magic, a unicorn's horn is strong and sharp enough to have mundane uses. They have beautiful horns which helps them use magic.

Friendship Garden Ponies included Copper Glow, Silver Glow, Golden Glow, and Diamond Glow. They all had attachable wings to become winged unicorns.

Name	Gender	Body color	Hair color	Eye color	Magic aura color	Cutie mark	Debut year	Animation debut	Voice actor	Generation(s)
Alphabittle Blossomforth	Male	Gray	White	Purple	Unknown	A teal teapot	2021	My Little Pony: A New Generation	Phil LaMarr	5
Alphabittle Blossomforth is a unicorn who owns the Crystal Tea Shop in Bridlewood. A gambler and expert at games, he has won many of other ponies' possessions, including the Unicorn Crystal, which the protagonists require to restore magic. Disguised as a unicorn, Sunny approaches Alphabittle to win the Unicorn Crystal, but wagers the Pegasus Crystal for it. After three rounds of Just Prance, a dancing game, Sunny emerges victorious, but loses her disguise in the process. Alphabittle insists that he won by default for being tricked, but the protagonists run away with the Unicorn Crystal. After encountering them again, and after a confrontation with the pegasi, everyone learns that no one has magic. During the final confrontation with all ponies present, Alphabittle saves his armadillo friends, but gets stuck, and is saved from being hit by Sprout's war machine by Queen Haven. As the de facto leader of the unicorns, Alphabittle joins the pegasi and earth ponies at the end to become friends again.
Brights Brightly	Female	Yellow	Orange and pink	Blue	Gold	Rising sun over stylized water and three pink hearts flying over the sun	2006	Crystal Princess: The Runaway Rainbow	Maryke Hendrikse	3
Brights Brightly is one of Cheerilee's friends, who alongside Whistle Wishes and Rarity was in charge of bringing in the first rainbow of the season until Rarity disappeared.
Buttons/Baby Buttons	Female	Lilac	Blue with a red streak	Blue	Unknown	Red buttons (Buttons); Two red buttons and blue stars (Baby Buttons)	1985	My Little Pony: The Movie	Sheryl Bernstein (My Little Pony: The Movie); Susan Blu (My Little Pony series)	1
Buttons loves to decorate her dresses with beautiful buttons. One night, when all the ponies were asleep, she decorated Ponyland with a basket of buttons. In the morning, the ponies looked outside their windows and were delighted to see buttons glittering in fluffy clouds and twinkling in trees. Buttons wove buttons in their hair to finish her unusual decorations. She is telekinetic with her magic and is sometimes bossy. Her daughter is Baby Buttons, who is also telekinetic.
Cinnamon Chai	Female	Peach	Light brown with light brunette streaks	Dark purple	Unknown	Cinnamon stick in a bowl of cake batter	2015	"Rarity Investigates"	Nicole Oliver	4
Cinnamon Chai is the owner of Canterlot's tea and cake shop. She has an Australian accent.
Coriander Cumin	Male	Amber	Purplish brunette	Purple	Purple	A bowl of rice	2016	"Spice Up Your Life"	Lee Tockar	4
Coriander Cumin is the host of The Tasty Treat. When his daughter Saffron welcomes Pinkie Pie and Rarity to this restaurant, he unintentionally sets up the chairs and packs up plates.
DJ Pon-3/Vinyl Scratch	Female	White	Blue	Moderate cerise	Blue (season 1); Pink (season 5)	Two quavers	2011	Friendship Is Magic	None	4
DJ Pon-3 is a background character in My Little Pony: Friendship is Magic, who first appeared as a DJ at Rarity's fashion show in the episode "Suited For Success." Fans gave her the name DJ Pon-3 due to her talent; this name was later mentioned in The Hub's "Equestria Girls" ad. She appeared again in "A Canterlot Wedding Part 2", in which she performed at the wedding reception. During that time, Pinkie Pie pulled her out onto the DJ booth, and her eyes were revealed. She later appeared in "Magical Mystery Cure" during the song "What My Cutie Mark is Telling Me", and was shown seven times in the film Equestria Girls. Two of the scenes she appeared in were during the film's namesake song, when Applejack removed her trademark sunglasses, and during the reprise of the song "This Is Our Big Night", when she performed during the Fall Formal. She then appeared in "Simple Ways" and "Testing, Testing, 1-2-3" in season four before appearing in "Rainbow Rocks" as the Rainbooms' disc jockey. She almost never talks in all of generation 4.
Fancy Pants	Male	White	Turquoise	Blue gray	Gold	Three golden crowns	2011	Friendship Is Magic	Trevor Devall	4
Fancy Pants is a sociable Unicorn pony of high social status. First appearing in the episode "Sweet and Elite", he is kind to Rarity, and admires the dress she made for Twilight, though it's unfinished and "simple" compared to most other Canterlot dress. He also shows an eagerness to meet Rarity's friends, even though they're from Ponyville. His overall attitude stands in contrast to that of other residents of Canterlot, who are generally distasteful of "rustic" fashion and ponies from the countryside.
Fizzy	Female	Turquoise	Pink, white, dark pink and green	Pink	Unknown	Fizzy sodas	1986	My Little Pony: The Movie	Katie Leigh	1
Fizzy is described to be a bit of an airhead but lovable and laid-back. Her horn can make bubbles from water or air and can move them around, though she doesn't always have complete control. She appears in 'My Little Pony: The Movie', 'The End Of Flutter Valley', 'The Ghost Of Paradise Estate', 'Sweetstuff And The Treasure Hunt', 'The Return Of Tambeleon', 'The Magic Coins', 'Mish Mash Melee', 'The Quest Of The Princess Ponies', and mentioned in 'Bright Lights.' In the UK comic books, she ran a Guy Fawkes Night-style holiday called Fizziwhizz Night.
Flam	Male	Tan	Red and white	Green	Green	Red apple	2012	Friendship Is Magic	Scott McNeil	4
Flam is the twin brother of Flim. He uses his unicorn magic to make apple cider. The brothers both debuted in the Friendship is Magic episode "The Super Speedy Cider Squeezy 6000".
Fleur Dis Lee	Female	White	Pale pink with whitish pink highlights	Lavender	Pink	Three fleurs-de-lis	2011	Friendship Is Magic	Nicole Oliver	4
Fleur Dis Lee is a sociable Unicorn pony of high social status. She also meets Rarity in the episode "Sweet and Elite" talking about life in Canterlot. Fleur Dis Lee's human counterpart appears in My Little Pony: Equestria Girls – Friendship Games as a student of Crystal Prep.
Flim Skim	Male	Tan	Red and white	Green	Green	Apple with missing piece	2012	Friendship Is Magic	Samuel Vincent	4
Flim is the twin brother of Flam. He uses his unicorn magic to make apple cider. The brothers both debuted in the "Friendship is Magic" episode "The Super Speedy Cider Squeezy 6000".
Galaxy	Female	Pinkish purple	Red, pink, white and orange	Pink	Unknown	Purple stars arranged in the shape of the Big Dipper	1986	My Little Pony (1986 TV series)	Sherry Lynn	1
Galaxy is described to be quite intelligent, resourceful, and seen as the voice of reason. She has a magical intuition and can generate light and heat with her horn. She appears in 'The Ghost Of Paradise Estate', 'Bright Lights', 'The Return Of Tambeleon', 'The Magic Coins', 'Would-Be Dragonslayer', 'Baby, It's Cold Outside', 'The Quest Of The Princess Ponies', and cameoed in 'Sweetstuff And The Treasure Hunt.' She only appeared in two UK comic books.
Glory/Baby Glory	Female	White	Purple with a blue streak in mane	Blue (toy version); Purple (animation)	Unknown	Purple and silver shooting star	1983	"Rescue From Midnight Castle" (Glory) "Escape from Catrina" (Baby Glory)	Fran Brill (as Glory); Katie Leigh (as Baby Glory)	1
A main character of Rescue From Midnight Castle. Glory is described to be the most elegant of all the Unicorn Ponies and moves from place to place with a magical stride, almost as though she had wings. Her magic takes her from kingdom to kingdom in search of a young girl who believes in magic and in unicorns. She also likes jumping and has a daughter named Baby Glory, who is described to be brave. Glory is the inspiration for the Friendship is Magic incarnation of Rarity, alongside Sparkler and Majesty.
Gusty/Baby Gusty	Female	White (Original); Unknown (FiM)	Green with a red streak (Original); Unknown (FiM)	Blue (Original); Unknown (FiM)	Unknown	Maple leaves	1984; 2019	My Little Pony: The Movie; Friendship Is Magic	Nancy Cartwright (as Gusty) (Original); Katie Leigh (as Baby Gusty) (Original); N/A (FiM)	1, 4
Gusty is a unicorn pony who has an impatient streak and is grouchy. She is athletic and brave, and can use her horn to summon the wind. She has one daughter named Baby Gusty, who shares the same impatient streak. Gusty appears again in flashbacks of the final season of Friendship is Magic as the pony who defeated Grogar.
Izzy Moonbow	Female	Lavender	Blue and purple	Purple	Unknown	A button inside a heart with three pins	2021	My Little Pony: A New Generation	Kimiko Glenn	5
Izzy Moonbow is one of the main characters of A New Generation. Toward the start of the movie, she wanders into the unicorn-fearing town of Maretime Bay where she meets Sunny Starscout. When Izzy says the unicorns don't have magic, the two of them start a journey to restore it. Unlike all of the other unicorns in Bridlewood Forest, whose demeanor is dour in nature from having lost magic, Izzy remains cheerful. It is revealed that Izzy wandered into Maretime Bay when she found a lantern sent by Sunny Starscout as a filly, asking for unicorns and pegasi to visit. Her hobby is making different things out of regular objects, which she dubs Unicorn Upcycling, or "Unicycling". She can sense a pony's "sparkle", or "luminescence", which can come in many different colors.
Joe (a.k.a. Pony Joe, a.k.a. Donut Joe)	Male	Light amber	Moderate orange	Green	Unknown	Donut	2011	Friendship Is Magic	Vincent Tong	4
Joe is a unicorn and a baker that appears in the episodes The Best Night Ever and MMMystery on the Friendship Express. In the former he is addressed as Pony Joe by Spike once, and in the latter as Donut Joe by Twilight Sparkle once, and simply as Joe from then on. Joe first appears in The Best Night Ever, as the owner of a donut shop in Canterlot. Twilight Sparkle and Spike state that they were frequent customers of Joe while they resided in Canterlot. He next appears aboard a train to Canterlot in MMMystery on the Friendship Express, gloating about how his Donutopia will win first place at the National Dessert Competition instead of the Cakes' Marzipan Mascarpone Meringue Madness. Joe is later under suspicion when Pinkie Pie theorizes that he is the culprit behind the damaging of the Cakes' cake, until Twilight proves that Joe did not do it after the other bakers' entries are eaten. When accused by Pinkie Pie, Joe is shown as a spy agent reminiscent of the James Bond series. Joe later admits to eating Gustave's éclairs, and Mulia admits to eating his Donutopia. At Pinkie's suggestion, the remainder of Joe's Donutopia was combined with the leftover treats to form a new cake for the competition. Joe appears to be a friendly and prideful baker, believing without a doubt his Donutopia will win first prize. When he is accused of eating Gustave's éclairs, he admits it was not out of spite, but rather because of how Pinkie Pie described it, and sincerely compliments Gustave. It is also revealed that in "Amending Fences", Joe works in Ponyville's donut cafe.
Lemon Hearts	Female	Lemon yellow	Columbia blue with a maya blue streak	Raspberry	Purplish pink	Three blue hearts; two blue, one green	2010	Friendship Is Magic	Ashleigh Ball	4
Lemon Hearts is a female unicorn pony who appeared in some episodes of My Little Pony: Friendship Is Magic. Lemon Hearts is commonly featured as a background pony. During running sequences, her eye style changes to one resembling Rarity's and her eye color turns blue. She makes her first appearance in Friendship is Magic, part 1, in Canterlot. She appears before Twilight Sparkle, alongside Twinkleshine and Minuette, while carrying a present on her back. She has no spoken lines, but she receives Twinkleshine's remark about Twilight when the studious unicorn turns down the offer to join them at Moondancer's get-together. Later in the episode, she appears at Pinkie Pie's party in Ponyville's library and is among the ponies who visually yell "Surprise!" to Twilight. Since then, Lemon Hearts has been a common sight in Ponyville. She attends the Grand Galloping Gala in The Best Night Ever and makes it into the V.I.P. section. She takes photos of Wonderbolts Spitfire and Soarin' with fellow Gala attendees "North Star" and "Masquerade". In "Putting Your Hoof Down", she offers two bits for the cherry Fluttershy wanted to buy for Angel's salad. An alicorn version of that character appears in "Rainbow Falls" due to an animation error.
Lily Lightly	Female	Purple	Light pink, pink and purple	Blue	Unknown	Pink lily flower on a blue stem with little stars below	2006	A Very Pony Place	Erin Mathews	3
Lily Lightly debuted in 2006 as a special pony with a light-up horn and a pretty pink gown and then debuted again in My Little Pony: A Very Pony Place. Dubbed the "Princess of All that Twinkles and Glows", Lily Lightly has a special horn which lights up when she is sad or happy. Though Lily finds her ability strange, her friends view it as part of her uniqueness.
Lyra Heartstrings	Female	Mint green	Pale, light grayish cyan with a white streak	Brilliant amber	Gold	Lyre	2010	Friendship Is Magic	Britt McKillip ("A Canterlot Wedding"); Ashleigh Ball ("Slice of Life")	4
Lyra Heartstrings is a background pony who appeared in some episodes of My Little Pony: Friendship Is Magic as one of the running gags of the show. Lyra is seen on the show doing background gags, such as bouncing on clouds, jumping around excitedly, drinking from a cup, or slouching on a park bench. She is frequently seen next to another background pony named Sweetie Drops. The pairing has been explained by a layout artist to be mostly coincidental and based on aesthetic considerations, as far as season one is concerned. The two are depicted talking in crowd scenes, enjoying a snack, or watching Applejack and Rainbow Dash during the Iron Pony Competition. In Lesson Zero, at one point in the background she physically fights one-on-one against Bon Bon for the possession of Smarty Pants. In "A Canterlot Wedding" Part 1 and Part 2, she is one of Queen Chrysalis's first bridesmaids, along with Minuette and Twinkleshine. In Part 1, she has a speaking role commenting on their dresses, saying that she loves them. In Part 2, she speaks in unison with the other two bridesmaids. Lyra also appears in Rainbow Rocks as one of the competitors in the Mane Event, together with Sweetie Drops. In the show's final season, she gets married with Bon Bon. Her name is not mentioned on-screen, until it first appeared in the accompanying pamphlet of a surprise bag toy released in early November 2011.
Majesty	Female	White	Blue with silver streak in mane	Purple	Unknown	Five glittery blue flowers	1984	The Magic Nut Tree; The Trolls and the Castle of Darkness; The Cross Weather Witch; A Shock at The Stable Show	N/A	1
Majesty is a unicorn pony, who appears only in the UK My Little Pony books: The Magic Nut Tree, The Trolls and the Castle of Darkness, The Cross Weather Witch and A Shock at the Stable Show. She is one of the most magical ponies, lives in the Dream Castle with her pet dragon Spike, and lowers the drawbridge when friends drop round for tea. She can makes wishes come true when she twirls her magic horn. Majesty is one of the inspirations for the Friendship is Magic incarnation of Rarity, alongside Glory and Sparkler.
Mimic	Female	Light yellow-green	Chartreuse, light pink and green	Green (toy version); Yellow (animation)	Unknown	Parrot	1986	My Little Pony (1986 TV series)	Nancy Cartwright	1
Mimic is a unicorn pony and the descendant of the first unicorn in Ponyland. Mimic has incredible powers far beyond the other unicorn ponies. With the power of the Golden Horseshoes, she is able to levitate things, glow brightly, read minds and see the future. After she falls ill, Megan and the Ponies goes in search for the Golden Horseshoes to restore Mimic's health back to normal.
Minuette	Female	Mayan blue	Periwinkle with dark blue streak	Dark blue	Various in different episodes	Hourglass	2010	Friendship Is Magic	Cathy Weseluck (first two seasons); Rebecca Hussain (season 5)	4
Minuette is a female unicorn pony who appeared in some episodes of My Little Pony: Friendship Is Magic. Minuette is a recurring background character in the series, first appearing in Friendship is Magic, part 1, as one of the trio of ponies heading to Moondancer's get-together, appearing in front of Twilight Sparkle near the beginning of the episode. Despite the scene being situated in Canterlot, Minuette also appears all over Ponyville. In the episode Winter Wrap Up, she is first seen as a member of the plant team, hornless. She later appears as part of the animal team with her horn included, and during the ice-carving scene she participates as a member of the weather team. In the moment that she is part of the plant team, she is touching heads with Berry Punch while singing. In Secret of my Excess, she accidentally collides with Cherry Berry while running away from Spike. In "A Canterlot Wedding" Part 1 and Part 2, she is one of Queen Chrysalis's first bridesmaids, along with Lyra Heartstrings and Twinkleshine. She has a speaking role in Part 1 and speaks in unison with the other two bridesmaids in Part 2. She has the latest major role in "Amending Fences" where Twilight Sparkle (who's now an alicorn) promises to accept the suggestion to Moondancer's get-together, with the magic of Friendship and Pinkie Pie on her side.
Moondancer/Baby Moondancer	Female	White (Generation 1); Blue (Generation 3); Light yellow (Generation 4)	Red with purple streak in mane (Generations 1 and 4); Pink with Purple streak in mane (Baby Moondancer); Yellow (Generation 3)	Blue (Generation 1); Pink (Baby Moondancer); Purple (Generations 3 and 4)	Light pink	Silver crescent moon surrounded by red stars (Generation 1); Yellow crescent moon and stars on a blue background (Generation 3)	1983 (Generation 1); 2003 (Generation 3)	Rescue From Midnight Castle	Laura Dean (as Moondancer); Alice Playten (as Baby Moondancer); Kazumi Evans (Generation 4)	1, 3, 4
A main character of Rescue From Midnight Castle. Moondancer is a unicorn pony who debuted in 1983 as part of the second wave of the Generation 1 Toyline. Moondancer then made her brief appearance in the first My Little Pony special Rescue From Midnight Castle. Moondancer is one of the four kidnapped ponies in Dream Valley during Scorpan's raid. Out of the four, she is the only unicorn pony who was corrupted by Tirek's Rainbow of Darkness in order to pull his chariot. She was reverted to normal after Tirek was destroyed. She has a daughter named Baby Moondancer, who is very shy. She got kidnapped by Catrina along with the Rainbow of Light to be used as a ransom to force the Bushwoolies to go back to her. Moondancer then later appeared in the Generation 3 toyline, with her appearance becoming an Earth pony rather than a unicorn. She is one of Twinkle Twirl's students who love to dance. According to Lauren Faust, Moondancer is meant to be a main character for My Little Pony: Friendship is Magic. However, due to the loss of almost all of the Generation 1 Names, she was then revamped and remade into Twilight Sparkle. She was only mentioned during the first episode of the series as a tribute. Moondancer was first mentioned in the first episode of Friendship is Magic, where she is said to be holding a party that Twilight was asked to come to, but Twilight refused. In Season 5 she makes her debut, where she has a messy tied up mane and wears a pair of aged eyeglasses and a dark purple turtleneck sweater with pink buttons on the front. Moondancer was affectedvery negatively by Twilight's prior refusal, and she became a recluse who only visits the library and does nothing else, proving to be a glimpse of what Twilight would have become has she not met the rest of the Mane 6. Learning that Moondancer was hurt by Twilight after trying to open herself up to her, Twilight eventually fixes her mistake.
Neon Lights	Male	Light blue	Gray	Blue	Cyan	Three white five-point stars	2012	?		4
Neon Lights is one of the minor characters in Friendship is Magic.
Party Favor	Male	Light blue	Dark blue with lighter highlights	Blue	Pink	Party balloons and streamers (regained)	2015	"The Cutie Map" My Little Pony: The Movie	Samuel Vincent (My Little Pony series) Zahari Baharov (My Little Pony: The Movie)	4
Party Favor is one of a group of four prominent ponies featured in The Cutie Map. Having given up his cutie mark and talent for making this out of balloons to live in Starlight's village, he and a few others instead desire their cutie marks back. When Starlight is overthrown, he regains his talent and uses it to build a balloon bridge to help the protagonists.
Powder	Female	Purple	White with red streak in mane	Pink	Unknown	Five glittery white snowflakes	1984	"Escape From Catrina"	Jeannie Elias	1
Powder is a unicorn pony, who is present in the opening sequence of "Escape From Catrina", giving Megan the Rainbow of Light.
Prince Blueblood	Male	White	Light amber	Cyan	Unknown	Eight-pointed compass rose	2010	Friendship Is Magic	Vincent Tong	4
Prince Blueblood is a unicorn pony and Rarity's love affection. In Rarity's fantasy, they swiftly fall in love and marry. Prince Blueblood appears outwardly the same in The Best Night Ever, where Rarity expects him to court her as he did in her dream, but he is too self-centered. Rarity expects Prince Blueblood to give her a rose, but he takes it for himself; he brings a cushion only for himself to sit in the castle's yard, leaving Rarity without a comfortable seat; she expects Blueblood to throw his coat over a puddle so her shoes won't get dirty, but he coerces to throw her shawl; he expects her to pay for his dining; and he generally ignores her wants, and patronizes "common ponies". He even goes as far as using Rarity as a pony shield from getting cake all over his clothes. Prince Blueblood's title was initially supposed to be 'Duke', and that he's the "great great great great great great great great great great great (and probably even more greats) nephew on Celestia's and Luna's mother's side, about 52 times removed, roughly speaking." Later, Amy Keating Rogers confirmed that Prince Blueblood is not Celestia's nephew.
Princess Sparkle	Female	Lavender	Aqua	Green (toy version); Turquoise (animation)	Unknown	Gold flower-shaped medallion with a green jewel	1986	My Little Pony (1986 TV series)	Alice Playten	1
One of the six Princess Ponies, Princess Sparkle is one of the keepers of the Magic Wands which maintains the balance of Ponyland's magic, until it was stolen by Lavan, the Lava Demon. She usually has feuds with the other Princess Ponies on who should be queen, until they settled their differences and work together. Princess Sparkle's wand allows her to manipulate plants.
Pumpkin Cake	Female	Yellow	Orange	Light blue	Light blue	N/A	2012	Friendship Is Magic	Andrea Libman	4
Pumpkin Cake is one of Carrot Cake and Cup Cake's newborn twins, the other being her brother Pound Cake. She has good magic despite her young age; Rarity's explanation for this is that "baby unicorns get strange magic surges that come and go". Her bad habit is that she likes to suck and chew on toys and other objects.
Rarity	Female	White	Indigo-purple	Deep blue with pale blue eyeshadow	pink (season 1), blue (present), green (under the spell of the book found by Spike)	Heart with multiple-colored swirls surrounding (Generation 3); Three light blue diamonds (Generation 4)	2006 (Generation 3); 2010 (Generation 4)	Crystal Princess: The Runaway Rainbow (Generation 3); Friendship Is Magic (Generation 4)	Cathy Weseluck (G3); Tabitha St. Germain (G4 (speaking)); Kazumi Evans (G4 (singing))	3, 4
Rarity is an energetic unicorn pony with a white body, deep blue eyes and an indigo-purple mane and tail. She was originally a young unicorn chosen to be one of the Rainbow Princesses. Rarity is very cheerful, energetic, full of mischief and sometimes values fun more than her duties. She also can feel sad and lonely after she misses her hometown and wanting to come back As one of the Rainbow Princesses alongside Brights Brightly, Cheerilee and Whistle Wishes, she was in charge on bringing in the first rainbow of the season and also using the Magic Wand. The Magic Wand allows her to control the colors to bring in the first rainbow of the season and lets her summon the Crystal Carriage. When it's not in use, she stores it inside her mane. In Friendship is Magic, Rarity became an older unicorn in the series. She is very stylish and beautiful, takes great interest in fashion and clothing design. She loves praise and acclaim and often tries to make herself the center of attention. However, she is glad to drop everything and make new outfits for her friends, even when they prove very hard to please. She is both a business owner and fashion designer, running the Carousel Boutique in Ponyville. She considers herself a lady and often acts sophisticated. She can also be very dramatic, often when a disaster occurs to her. She is Sweetie Belle's older sister and dreams of becoming a designer for Princess Celestia. She fantasized about marrying Celestia's nephew Prince Blueblood, until he she actually met him, where he turned out to be snobbish, rude, and self-centred. Rarity's magic has been demonstrated to involve both telekinesis and finding nearby jewels buried underground. Rarity's elemental spirit is Generosity.
Ribbon/Baby Ribbon	Female	Blue	Yellow with orange streak in mane	Green	Unknown	White ribbon	1986	My Little Pony: The Movie	Katie Leigh	1
Ribbon is very mature and motherly to her daughter, Baby Ribbon, and is also telepathic, a power she uses to contact Megan when she is captured at Tambelon. Baby Ribbon has a lot of difficulty winking in and out and is close to Baby Gusty. She is also telepathic.
Royal Unicorn Guards	Male	Gray	White	Yellow	Unknown	Various	2010	Friendship Is Magic	N/A	4
Unicorn Royal guards first appear in the Friendship Is Magic opening scene, and make subsequent appearances in future episodes.
Saffron Masala	Female	Orange	Purplish brunette	Purple	Purple	Lavender lily	2016	"Spice Up Your Life"	Diana Kaarina	4
Saffron is the daughter of Coriander Cumin. She likes to cook Indian food for a restaurant called the Tasty Treat. She has an Eastern Indian accent.
Sassy Saddles	Female	Light blue	Orange and yellow with a purple understreak	Orange	Light yellow	Pins (covered)	2015	"Canterlot Boutique"	Kelly Sheridan	4
Sassy Saddles appears in the episode Canterlot Boutique. As the manager of Rarity's Canterlot store, she has a comprehensive vision of how to achieve success, but this puts a strain on Rarity and takes the enjoyment and artistry out of dressmaking for her, after having to design 100 copies of a specific new dress. After realizing this, Sassy Saddles decides to do things Rarity's way.
Shining Armor	Male	Turquoisish white	Moderate sapphire blue and moderate cerulean	Moderate cerulean	Magenta	Pink six-pointed star over a purple shield with three small light blue stars above it	2012	Friendship Is Magic	Andrew Francis	4
Shining Armor is a unicorn pony and also the leader of the Canterlot Royal Guards. He is the older brother of Twilight Sparkle and the husband of Princess Cadance, which shocks his little sister upon hearing the news. Although very close to his sister, he has evidently lost touch with her as a result of her relocation to Ponyville. Initially, he is happy to see Twilight again upon her return to Canterlot, asking her to be his Best Mare at the wedding. However, due to a spell put on him, this excitement quickly turns to frustration and anger as she - unbeknownst to the rest of the cast, correctly - decries the Changeling Queen Chrysalis, in the form of Cadance, as evil and unworthy of her brother. After Twilight manages to expose and defeat the Queen and rescue all of Canterlot, including her brother, in addition to then arranging a wedding, the siblings reconcile with his profound gratitude.
Snails	Male	Gold	Medium aquamarine	Black	Unknown	Snail	2010	Friendship Is Magic	Richard Ian Cox	4
Snails is often seen in the company of his friend Snips and is shown to be slow in nature and mind. He admires the bragging magician Trixie along with Snips. In later seasons, he shows proficiency at the unicorn position while playing buckball.
Snips	Male	Pale cyan	Ochre	Black	Unknown	Pair of scissors	2010	Friendship Is Magic	Lee Tockar	4
Snips is an excitable and goofy pony, who jumps eagerly at the slightest inclination. He is unusually short and round, and may be one of the smallest in Ponyville. He is characterized by small black eyes, bucked teeth, dark eyebrows, and a high and scratchy voice. These features grant him a unique appearance relative to the other residents of Ponyville. In Boast Busters, his first appearance, he displayed an infatuation with Trixie, a braggart magician.
Sparkler/Amethyst Star	Female	Pale blue (Generation 1); Pale magenta (Generation 4)	Purple with a red streak (Generation 1); Purple with a light purple streak (Generation 4)	Purple	Purple	Diamonds	1984	"Escape From Catrina"	Ivy Austin (Generation 1); Cathy Weseluck (Generation 4)	1, 4
Sparkler is a unicorn pony, who is present in the opening sequence of "Escape From Catrina", painting the welcome sign for Megan's return and also during the end of the special, wearing a cheerleader outfit and likes to dance. Sparkler is one of the inspirations for the Friendship Is Magic incarnation of Rarity, alongside Glory and Majesty. A pony with a similar name (Amethyst Star) appears as a background character in Friendship is Magic.
Starflower	Female	Blue	Coral, pink, aqua and neon yellow (toy version); Orange, pink, light blue, and green (animation)	Green	Unknown	Six glittery dark pink stars	1984 (Generation 1); 2006 (Generation 3)	"Escape From Catrina"	Alice Playten	1, 3
Starflower is a unicorn pony and one of the two Rainbow Ponies alongside Skydancer. She is present in the opening sequence of "Escape From Catrina", doing decorations for Megan's return in Ponyland. She has not demonstrated any magical ability with her horn. Generation 3 Starflower was released in 2006 as part of the Crystal Design set even though her symbol is not 3D.
Starlight Glimmer	Female	Lilac	Violet with lighter and teal streak	Purple-blue	Turquoise	Purple star with cyan waves	2015	"The Cutie Map" – Part 1	Kelly Sheridan	4
Starlight Glimmer is a unicorn pony with a light lilac body, purple-blue eyes and a violet mane and tail with a lighter and teal streak. She is the main antagonist in season 5 of Friendship is Magic. She was the leader of a remote town forcing equality by having everyone forgo their talents and sharing the same equal sign cutie mark, until she was revealed not to have changed her own cutie mark, leading to the ponies turning against her. In the season finale, The Cutie Re-mark, she attempts to rewrite time as revenge so that Rainbow Dash never performs the Sonic Rainboom that leads to the rest of the Mane 6 getting their cutie marks, but this results in increasingly bleaker futures in the present every time she does it. After admitting that the motivation for starting her town was that a childhood friend of hers, Sunburst, got his Cutie Mark and headed off to Celestia's school never to be seen again, Twilight convinces her to start friendship anew, and later Starlight becomes a major supporting character alongside the Mane 6. At the start of Season 6, she even reunites and reconciles with Sunburst.
Starswirl the Bearded	Male	Gray	White	Blue	White					
Starswirl the Bearded is a wizard from many years ago of great renown, and idol to Twilight Sparkle, but did not truly grasp the powers of friendship. He is often mentioned throughout the series, but finally appears in the Season 7 finale, Shadow Play, where he is revealed to be one of six legendary heroes of the past called the Pillars of Equestria, who sealed the Pony of Shadows away in limbo, while sealing themselves away in the process. Once Twilight finds out what happened and undoes the seal, releasing them all, Starswirl is very terse with her, and attempts to re-seal the Pony of Shadows by sacrificing the Elements of Harmony. It is only after learning that the Pony of Shadows used to be the Pillars' founder and friend, a unicorn named Stygian, and turned to darkness after a major misunderstanding, Starlight Glimmer and Twilight help to convince him and the Pillars to mend their friendship instead, and Starswirl sees the error of his ways, coming out more respectful of Twilight.
Sugar Belle	Female	Light pink	Bright magenta	Bright pink	Turquoise	Purple cupcake with a red cherry on top and surrounded with colorful sprinkles (regained)	2015	"The Cutie Map" – Part 1	Rebecca Shoichet	4
Sugar Belle is a unicorn pony with a light pink body, bright pink eyes and a bright magenta mane and tail. She was the baker of the equalized town in Equestria, but could not bake well after giving up her cutie mark. In later seasons, after getting her cutie mark back, Big Mac develops an infatuation with her, which is eventually given back, and the two of them marry toward the end of the series.
Sunburst	Male	Orange with white bottom legs and snout	Red with orange highlights	Cyan	Yellow	Sun surrounded by teal stars unleashing rays	2015	"The Cutie Re-Mark" - Part 2	Ian Hanlin	4
Sunburst is Starlight Glimmer's old friend who first taught her magic when they were foals, but was sent off to Celestia's unicorn school after getting his cutie mark. Now as a grownup stallion, he has a long, thin beard, a pair of glasses and a wizard's cape. When meeting Starlight Glimmer again after many years, he admits that he was not able to perform magic well enough at the school, but he had amassed a wealth of magic knowledge, which is instrumental in restoring the shattered Crystal Heart and saving the Crystal Empire. He then becomes Flurry Heart's Crystaller at the Empire, and rekindles his friendship with Starlight.
Sunset Shimmer	Female	Light amber	Red with yellow streak	Cyan-green	Sea-green (originally); Red (EG series)	Red and yellow yin-yang sign with sun rays	2013	Equestria Girls	Rebecca Shoichet	4
Sunset Shimmer is an antagonist unicorn pony with a light amber body, cyan-green eyes and a red mane and tail with a yellow streak. She first appeared in Equestria Girls. She is also one of the ponies who is mainly in human form. She is one of Princess Celestia's old students. She was the bully of Canterlot High School, intimidating others and humiliating them to get her way. She stole Twilight's crown but lost it in the human world and tried to prevent Twilight from getting it back by humiliating her. After stealing it again after Twilight wins it back, she puts it on and transforms into a she-demon, and uses her new powers to mind control everyone in the school to be her own army to take over Equestria. Twilight's crown, however, sensed Twilight's friendship with her human friends and granted them magic to defeat Sunset and undo her dark magic. Sunset came to regret her misdeeds and was offered friendship by Twilight and her friends. She also appears in Rainbow Rocks as a reformed character, now on the side of Twilight Sparkle and her friends. She attempts to be helpful but nobody in the school trusts her after her past misdeeds. Sunset feels like an outsider for much of the film, even to her own friends, and is constantly reminded, accidentally, about her past evil actions and demon form. When her friends begin to argue and empower the Dazzlings during the finals, she finally confronts them over the small problems they have been having but not facing and tells them that unless they work out all their problems from the start, the magic of friendship can be turned into something else. She then helps Twilight and the others defeat the Dazzlings, gaining her own magic half-pony form and gaining the acceptance of the rest of the school.
Sweetie Belle	Female	white	Purple and light purple with a pink highlight in mane (Generation 3) lavender with light pink streak (Generation 4)	Green	Light green	Sparkly pink heart (Generation 3); Red, white, and purple shield with star and eighth note in center (Generation 4)	2008 (Generation 3); 2011 (Generation 4)	Meet the Ponies (Generation 3); Friendship Is Magic (Generation 4)	Andrea Libman (G3); Claire Corlett (G4); Michelle Creber (singing voice, G4; seasons 1-3)	3, 4
Sweetie Belle is a filly unicorn pony with a white-grey body, green eyes and a lavender mane and tail with a light pink streak, and a member of the Core 7 ponies. Usually the youngest of the group, she hails from Unicornia, before being teleported to Ponyville when she was once a foal. She has a big heart and likes to bake sweets for her friends. She also can demonstrate magic; however, this was only shown in "Once Upon a My Little Pony Time", where she used it to fix Rainbow Dash's scarf. In Friendship is Magic, she is a young unicorn pony and also Rarity's younger sister. She is also one of Apple Bloom's friends, and a member of the "Cutie Mark Crusaders". Sweetie Belle tends to be a slower thinker than Apple Bloom and Scootaloo, but is as excitable as they are and will readily follow their lead. Though she wants to be a designer like Rarity, her inexperience and clumsiness prove to be a hindrance when she tries to assist in the shop. She has a talent for singing and songwriting, turning one of Fluttershy's lullabies into a rousing gospel number, but prefers not to sing in public.
Trenderhoof	Male	Light brown	Blond	Purple	Purple	Symmetry pattern	2014	Friendship Is Magic	Doron Bell	4
Trenderhoof is a unicorn pony who writes for a Canterlot newspaper, and Rarity is highly in love with him. When he shows up to write about a Ponyville event, Rarity attempts to meet him, but upon seeing Sweet Apple Acres, he instead becomes smitten with Applejack and her farm lifestyle.
Trixie Lulamoon	Female	Blue	Two-tone light blue	Purple	Pink (in her normal use); Red (when wearing the Alicorn Amulet)	Star-tipped magic wand spreading stardust	2010	Friendship Is Magic	Kathleen Barr	4
Trixie Lulamoon (who refers to herself in third person as The Great and Powerful Trixie) is a unicorn pony with a blue body, purple eyes and a two-tone light blue mane and tail, and a traveling magician. She visits Ponyville with her show, in which she greatly exaggerates her magical abilities through the use of fireworks and stage effects, and claims to have defeated an Ursa Major. Shortly thereafter, Trixie is unable to defeat an Ursa Minor, the infant offspring of the Ursa Major, when it attacks Ponyville after being startled out of its nap. After Twilight calms it down, Trixie admits her deception and flees from Ponyville. She returns in "Magic Duel" where it is revealed her career was ruined after what happened and had to work on a rock farm for a living. She obtained the Alicorn Amulet, giving her immense power but slowly corrupting her. She challenged Twilight to magic duel and won, then banished Twilight from the town to remake it in her image. When Twilight's friends learned of the amulet and informed Twilight, they devised a plan where Twilight challenged Trixie to a rematch with her own supposedly more powerful amulet, performing tremendous magical feats. When Trixie removed her Alicorn Amulet to steal this other amulet, she realized it was fake, learning that Twilight's supposed magic was pulled off through more clever and deceptive means. Freed from her corruption, Trixie later apologized to Twilight for what she did to her and her friends while under the influence of the amulet and became friends with Twilight before once again leaving Ponyville. In the film Equestria Girls, Trixie is seen getting peanut butter crackers from the school's vending machine and makes several background cameos. She appears as the secondary antagonist and is the leader of her own band, the Illusions, in "Rainbow Rocks". She like most of the school becomes overly competitive while under the Dazzlings spell when the showcase is turned into a competition. Her band makes it to the semi-finals and becomes angered when she loses to the Rainbooms despite the ladder not finishing their song. She is convinced by the Dazzlings to stop the Rainbooms from performing by trapping them under the stage. With the Rainbooms apparently forfeiting Trixie's band plays in the finals instead. Her band is disqualified when the Rainbooms reappear and defeat the Dazzlings. Despite being freed from the spell, Trixie still swears revenge for her defeat, while interrupting Twilight and Flash's romantic moment, and exits the stage after throwing a smoke bomb, falling off the stands during her getaway.
Twilight	Female	Pink	White with a purple streak	Purple	Unknown	Purple stars	1983	Rescue from Midnight Castle	Laura Dean	1
Twilight is shown to have a special ability to teleport by wishing herself. She also likes to gaze to the stars. In the UK comics, she was a mysterious little pony who would occasionally appear to grant wishes after dark surrounded by a strange mist. Twilight is the inspiration for the main protagonist of My Little Pony: Friendship is Magic, Twilight Sparkle.
Twinkleshine	Female	Pink (toy); White (animation)	Dark pink (toy); Light pink (animation)	Turquoise	Unknown	Three blue stars	2010	Friendship Is Magic	Nicole Oliver, Cathy Weseluck, and Tabitha St. Germain (S1E1); Andrea Libman (S2E25)	4
Twinkleshine is fairly commonly featured in the series as a background pony, appearing in over half the episodes in season 1. Her first and most prominent appearance is in Friendship is Magic, part 1, where she, Lemon Hearts and Minuette meet Twilight Sparkle in Canterlot while carrying presents on their backs. She informs Twilight about Moondancer's get-together and asks her to come along. When Twilight declines on the grounds that she has "a lot of studying to catch up on", Twinkleshine expresses her exasperation behind Twilight's back and chides her for showing more interest in books than friends. She next appears in the surprise party that Pinkie Pie throws for Twilight later in the episode, and has since then remained a regular sight in Ponyville. In The Ticket Master, she is one of the ponies crowding around Twilight in front of the library, and again in the alley that Twilight eventually teleports away from. A handful of frames show her starting to run after Twilight, but she is not part of the throng of background ponies in the chase scene that follows. During her two-second participation in the race, her mane style changes to one resembling that of Cherry Berry and Berry Punch. In The Cutie Mark Chronicles, she appears in Fluttershy and Rainbow Dash's flashbacks of flight camp, standing on a cloud in the sidelines before the race starts, even though she is not a pegasus. However, as proved in Sonic Rainboom, there is a spell that enables non-pegasus ponies to walk on clouds, making the circumstances around Twinkleshine's station in Cutie Mark Chronicles much more plausible. In A Canterlot Wedding Part 1 and Part 2, she is one of Queen Chrysalis's first bridesmaids, along with Minuette and Lyra Heartstrings. Her design in the animation resembles the G1 pony Moondancer. However, her playful pony release gave her a different look, making her resemble the G2 pony Princess Twinkle Star. Twinkleshine's description in the toys says she wants to be a Movie Star.
Whistle Wishes	Female	Light blue	Pink, yellow and green mane, pink and orange tail	Green	Unknown	Rainbow stars and a cloud	2006	Crystal Princess: The Runaway Rainbow	Brittney Wilson	3
Whistle Wishes is one of Cheerilee's friends, who alongside Brights Brightly and Rarity, was in charge of bringing in the first rainbow of the season until Rarity disappeared.

=== Alicorn ponies ===
Alicorn ponies with a pair of wings and a horn are rare in the franchise. They usually have the abilities of all three other kinds, the Earth, Unicorn and Pegasus ponies. They have appeared in the toy line since Generation Four, and may have been the spiritual successors to the Princess Ponies of Generation One. Dazzleglow made an appearance in My Little Pony Tales, but her toy form, a unicorn released before Tales as a part of the Glow 'n Show Ponies lineup, is unrelated to that of Tales. All four of the G4 Alicorn princesses are portrayed as being taller and more slender than most ponies, with unique horns and wings.

Name	Gender	Body color	Hair color	Eye color	Magic aura color	Cutie mark	Debut year	Animation debut	Voice actor	Generation(s)
Dazzleglow	Female	Pink	Blue and pink	Pink	Unknown	Yellow umbrellas	1992 (as a unicorn pony)	My Little Pony Tales	Claire Cleena	1
Dazzleglow is a Glow 'N Show Pony and the first pony with wings and horns to officially appear in animation until the appearance of Princess Celestia and Princess Luna in My Little Pony: Friendship is Magic. She and her companions are first viewed as a glowing cloud of stardust. Starlight and her friends think they are UFOs until Patch and Bon Bon meet them up close.
Princess Flurry Heart	Female	Bright Pink with pink wing tips	Pink, purple and light blue	Ice blue	Pink (as a result of her sneeze); Yellow (better state)	Unknown	2016	The Crystalling - Part 1	Tabitha St. Germain	4
Flurry Heart is the daughter of Princess Cadence and Shining Armor. Unlike newborn baby foals, when she cries, she unleashes sonic waves which ultimately breaks the Crystal Heart.
Princess Celestia	Female	White	Pastel colors: light cerulean, light turquoise, very light cobalt blue, and pale heliotrope (Friendship Is Magic)	Light purple	Yellow	Sun	2010	Friendship Is Magic	Nicole Oliver	4
Princess Celestia, the elder sister of Princess Luna, is one of the two rulers of Equestria and has the magical ability to control the sun. One thousand years before the start of the series, she used the Elements of Harmony to seal her sister, who had transformed herself into Nightmare Moon, into the moon. She is Twilight Sparkle's teacher and gave her the task to "make friends" in Ponyville upon learning of Nightmare Moon's return. However, after her sister is restored to her true form, she forgives her and allows Twilight Sparkle to remain in Ponyville with a new task of "studying the magic of friendship". She almost always refers to Twilight Sparkle as "her Faithful Student". She often does not directly state her goals, but rather gives advice to help her students find the answers they need. Though viewed with great reverence and awe due to her position, she often encourages her subjects to relax with jokes and gentle questions. She also shows great patience with any inappropriate behavior towards her. While always regal in both appearance and manner, Princess Celestia has been known to display a fun-loving side, appreciating the humor in a bottle of disappearing ink sent to her by Twilight. At times, she will even disregard the strict standards of high-class society when they become too much of a burden for her. However, it has been shown that while kindhearted and slow to anger, Celestia's patience does have its limits. When Spike makes her aware that Twilight has inadvertently unleashed mass chaos onto Ponyville in her obsessive attempts to find an overdue Friendship report to send to the Princess, Celestia personally intervenes to undo the damage caused by Twilight and sternly orders her student to a private meeting to discuss her actions; one of the few instances thus far where she was genuinely angry, albeit justifiably given the chaos Twilight caused. Fortunately, even in anger Celestia remains understanding, and at the insistence of Twilight's friends agrees not to punish Twilight, instead asking them all to send her friendship reports only when the lessons make themselves apparent to them. Princess Celestia possesses magic far beyond normal unicorn ponies. She is able to control the sun and the daytime sky, bringing them out each day and then moving them away to make room for the night. She also has the ability to dispel magic. Princess Celestia was originally supposed to be Queen Celestia, as is logical considering her position, but Hasbro requested the name be changed, alleging that Disney has caused princesses to be associated with good and queens associated with evil. Princess Celestia is the Diarch of Equestria, alongside her younger sister, Princess Luna; they are the highest authority, with no other king or queen who outranks them.
Princess Luna /Nightmare Moon	Female	Grayish purple (as Luna, younger version); Dark Purple (as Luna and older version); Blackish blue (as Nightmare Moon)	Light blue (as Luna, younger version); Dark blue (Nightmare Moon and older version)	Moderate cyan	Blue	Crescent moon on a dark background	2010	Friendship Is Magic	Tabitha St. Germain (speaking); Kazumi Evans (singing, season 4); Aloma Steele (singing, season 6)	4
Princess Luna is the younger sister of Celestia. Originally she raised/lowered the moon each night, but she became jealous of Celestia because the ponies slept through the night and thus could not appreciate her work. This jealousy eventually transformed Luna into the shadowy Nightmare Moon. In her new form, her body is black in blue armor with her mane and tail appearing to be made entirely out of sparkly indigo, purple-rimmed moondust that she can use as limbs. Celestia was forced to seal her in the moon after she attempted to bring eternal night to the world. During the pilot episode, she breaks free after a thousand years and returns to Equestria on the longest day of the year, intent on carrying out her plan again. She uses her powers to hinder Twilight Sparkle and the other ponies in their search for the Elements of Harmony. In season 2, she undergoes a design change, with her mane changed from opaque to translucent, and she became slightly taller and more slender. Eventually, she is returned to her original form with the Elements and resumes her place at Celestia's side. Luna returns to Ponyville during Nightmare Night, Equestria's version of Halloween, with a taller and more slender build, a darker coat, and a translucent mane and tail. With Twilight's help, she tries to change her public image from that of the terrifying Nightmare Moon (on which the holiday is based) to a more favorable one as Princess. Her first attempts end disastrously, prompting her to decree Nightmare Night canceled, but Twilight persuades her to give Ponyville another chance. When Luna discovers that the residents enjoy being scared as part of the night's festivities, she uses the Nightmare Moon persona to help them have fun and thus gains their trust and friendship. Luna is shown to be extremely royal and formal towards her subjects, being quick to anger and easily offended. This off-putting facade of authority, however, is revealed to be a product of her thousand-year-old customs and ideas of propriety rather than intentional rudeness, and is shown to belie her fundamentally sensitive, caring, fun-loving nature. The results of Luna's thousand-year imprisonment in the moon and her subsequent unfamiliarity with more modern customs show themselves quite strongly in the fourth episode of season 2. She is able to control the moon and the night sky, bringing them out each night and then moving them away to make room for the dawn. As seen in "Luna Eclipsed", she can bring inanimate objects back to life using her magic and can also shape-shift at will, noticeably assuming the form of Nightmare Moon. As Nightmare Moon, she is able to take on the form of objects and other characters. Luna has also shown (in the third-season episode "Sleepless in Ponyville") the ability to enter ponies' dreams, as she does to help and counsel Scootaloo during one of her nightmares. Princess Luna is the Diarch of Equestria, alongside her older sister, Princess Celestia; they are the highest authority, with no other king or queen who outranks them.
Princess Mi Amore Cadenza/ Princess Cadance	Female	Pale, light grayish cerise with lavender colored wing tips	Dark violet, moderate rose and pale gold	Purple	Turquoise	Teal heart-shaped gem within gold lace	2012	Friendship Is Magic	Britt McKillip	4
Princess Mi Amore Cadenza, or "Princess Cadance", is the winged unicorn pony niece of Princess Celestia and Princess Luna, and also the wife of Shining Armor, Twilight's older brother. Cadance is first mentioned by Twilight Sparkle in A Canterlot Wedding – Part 1 when Twilight declaims the wedding invitation sent to her from Princess Celestia. Twilight is invited to "the wedding of Princess Mi Amore Cadenza and... [Twilight's] brother", Shining Armor. Twilight immediately resents the situation for not being told about it personally by her brother, and does not recognize the name "Princess Mi Amore Cadenza". When Twilight gets to Canterlot and confronts her brother about the wedding, he tells her that Princess Cadance is her old foalsitter and Twilight gleefully calls her "the greatest foalsitter in all the history of foalsitters" then goes on to praise her as "beautiful", "caring", and "kind" in her voice-over of a flashback of her childhood where she is foal-sat by Cadance. Cadance, as Twilight describes, is caring and kind in the flashback and according to that, she wears a ponytail decorated in a light blue bow with her tail to match as a young mare. She greets Twilight with a hug, bandages her and wipes her tears when she is hurt, plays with her on a swing-set, tells Twilight she feels lucky to be her foal-sitter, and does a little song-and-dance with her. Twilight's voice-over says Cadance spreads love wherever she goes, while a brief scene shows Cadance casting a spell that quells an argument between two ponies. Twilight mentions in the flashback that Cadance is a princess. Twilight discovered that Cadance was abducted by the Changelings as part of their Queen's scheme to conquer Equestria, and the childhood friends together foiled the plot. Afterward, Cadance participates enthusiastically in the rescheduled wedding's preparations while Shining Armor tells Twilight that it was the prospect of gaining her as a sister-in-law was convinced Cadance to accept his proposal. Cadance is sent north with her husband to the Crystal Empire after it returns after 1,000 years and assists the Mane Six in keeping it safe from its former ruler, King Sombra. She is now the princess of the Crystal Empire. The Princess' name was inspired by that of the daughter of a Hasbro Studios executive, "Cadince". "Cadence" is also a musical term meaning modulation, inflection rhythm, or the closing sequence of a musical phrase.
Princess Twilight Sparkle	Female	Light purple	Indigo-blue with dark pink and purple streak	Deep purple	Pink	Magenta six-pointed star, surrounded by five smaller white stars	2010 (as unicorn)	Friendship Is Magic (as unicorn)	Tara Strong (speaking); Rebecca Shoichet (singing)	4
Princess Twilight Sparkle (called Twilight) is an alicorn pony with a light purple body, deep purple eyes and a indgo-blue mane and tail with a purple and dark pink streak. She is the younger sister of Shining Armor and the sister-in-law of Princess Cadance, and is one of the Elements of Harmony. She is described to be talented in magic and very studious. Priding herself on being Princess Celestia's dearest pupil, she once considered knowledge to be much more important than friendship. When the danger of the Mare in the Moon loomed, Princess Celestia sent her to Ponyville to learn the importance of friendship, which proved invaluable in her confrontation with Nightmare Moon. She decides to stay in Ponyville and study friendship with her mentor's blessings. Twilight studies extensively and takes an organized, sometimes overly analytical approach to solving problems. She sometimes appears to have an insecure side when it comes to fitting in with others, and can be too neat and overly-organized for her own good. Unlike other unicorn ponies, Twilight can perform a wide variety of magic, including teleportation, force fields, and telekinesis. She represents the Element of Magic, which takes the form of a tiara. She has an older brother named Shining Armor, the captain of the Canterlot Royal Guard, who marries her former babysitter Princess Cadance. In "Owl's Well That Ends Well", she gained a pet horned owl named Owlowiscious. In "Magical Mystery Cure", Twilight accidentally activates an unfinished spell created by historic figure Star Swirl the Bearded, causing her friends' Cutie Marks to be swapped and altering their destiny. After correcting her mistake, Twilight is able to complete the spell, creating new magic in the process. Fulfilling her destiny predicted by Princess Celestia, Twilight is then transformed into a winged unicorn, referred to as an "alicorn" in the series, and ascends to become a Princess of Equestria alongside Celestia, Princess Luna and Princess Cadance. Another part of magic she does is to freeze moving subjects like she does to Applejack, Fluttershy, Rarity and Rainbow Dash in the episode called Castlemane-ia. In "Twilight's Kingdom", she is now the Princess of Friendship with her responsibility to help spread friendship across Equestria with the help of her friends.

== Works cited ==
- "My Little Pony". Hasbro.
- Summer Hayes (May 1, 2008) The My Little Pony G1 Collector's Inventory: an unofficial full color illustrated collector's price guide to the first generation of MLP including all US ponies, playsets and accessories released before 1997 with a foreword by Dream Valley's Kim Shriner. Priced Nostalgia Press. ISBN 978-0-9786063-1-2
- Summer Hayes (2007) The My Little Pony G3 Collector's Inventory: an unofficial full color illustrated guide to the third generation of MLP including all ponies, playsets and accessories from 2003 to the present. Priced Nostalgia Press. ISBN 978-0-9786063-5-0
- Hillary DePiano (2005) The My Little Pony Collector's Inventory: A Complete Checklist of All US Ponies, Playsets and Accessories from 1981 to 1992. Priced Nostalgia Press. ISBN 1-4116-2165-4
- Summer Hayes (2009) The My Little Pony 2007-2008 Collector's Inventory. Priced Nostalgia PressISBN 978-0-9786063-6-7
- Debra L. Birge (2007) My Little Pony*r Around the World. Schiffer Publishing. ISBN 978-0-7643-1749-1
- Wood, Walton. "The Empirical Twilight: A Pony's Guide to Science & Anarchism" ImageTexT: Interdisciplinary Comics Studies. 6.1 (2011): n. pag. Dept of English, University of Florida. 18 December 2011. Web.
- Brandon T. Snider. (2013) My Little Pony: The Elements of Harmony: Friendship is Magic: The Official Guidebook. LiBrown Books.
