= Peanuts Motion Comics =

- Genre: Comedy
- Based on: Peanuts by Charles M. Schulz
- Directed by: Brad Gibson; Jayson Thiessen
- Voices of: Alex Ferris; Michelle Creber; Claire Corlett; Quinn Lord; Jake D. Smith; Taya Calicetto; Leigh Bourke; Alison Cohen
- Composer: Randall Crissman
- Country of origin: United States
- Original language: English
- No. of seasons: 1
- No. of episodes: 20 (list of episodes)

Production
- Executive producers: Chris Bartleman; Blair Peters
- Producers: Kirsten Newlands (line); Ralph Sanchez (co)
- Running time: 8 minutes
- Production companies: United Feature Syndicate, Inc.; Charles M. Schulz Creative Associates; Warner Premiere Digital

Original release
- Network: iTunes
- Release: November 3, 2008

Peanuts Motion Comics is an American animated miniseries based on 1964 strips of the comic strip Peanuts by Charles M. Schulz. The series premiered on iTunes on November 3, 2008, with the support of the Schulz estate. The series consists of 20 cartoon shorts, paired into 10 episodes. The episodes employ signature themes and plotlines from the classic strips. The series was released to DVD on March 9, 2010. Animation production was done by Studio B Productions.

== Voice actors ==
- Alex Ferris as Charlie Brown
- Michelle Creber as Lucy van Pelt
- Claire Corlett as Sally Brown
- Quinn Lord as Linus van Pelt
- Jake D. Smith as Schroeder/Shermy
- Taya Calicetto as Violet Gray
- Leigh Bourke as Patty
- Alison Cohen as Frieda

== List of episodes ==
Title	Plot	Air Date
"Linus for President"	Lucy convinces Linus to run for student body president and becomes his campaign manager.	iTunes (2008), DVD (2010)
"The Election"	Linus picks Charlie Brown to be his running mate, but will a series of speeches by Linus seal the election?	iTunes (2008), DVD (2010)
"The Sore Arm"	Charlie Brown is diagnosed with Little Leaguer's Arm, trains Linus to replace him as pitcher, and becomes his team's manager.	iTunes (2008), DVD (2010)
"Independence Day"	School lets out and Charlie Brown and Snoopy prepare for a camping trip, while Linus learns the meaning of Independence Day.	iTunes (2008), DVD (2010)
"Eraserophagia"	Charlie Brown is diagnosed with a condition from nibbling on too many erasers while Snoopy thinks about food.	iTunes (2008), DVD (2010)
"Dear Great Pumpkin"	Linus prepares for the arrival of the Great Pumpkin while Lucy torments Charlie Brown yet again on a football field.	iTunes (2008), DVD (2010)
"A Fall Rain"	During a huge rain storm, Snoopy tries to stop his doghouse from sinking during a flood.	iTunes (2008), DVD (2010)
"Some Advice"	Both Charlie Brown and Linus want to find a way to be happier people.	iTunes (2008), DVD (2010)
"Ready to Pitch"	As Charlie Brown's "Little Leaguer's Elbow" subsides, he attempts a return to pitching for his team.	iTunes (2008), DVD (2010)
"Back on the Mound"	Now recovered from his injury, Charlie Brown returns to pitch, while Lucy flirts with Schroeder during the baseball games.	iTunes (2008), DVD (2010)
"Dear Santa Claus"	The first snow of winter arrives and Linus writes a letter to Santa Claus while Snoopy tries to keep his doghouse from being snowed under.	iTunes (2008), DVD (2010)
"I'm New at It"	Linus is trying to meditate for the first time because he is sad, and Charlie Brown and Lucy try to help in their own ways.	iTunes (2008), DVD (2010)
"The Science Project"	Lucy uses Linus for a school project.	iTunes (2008), DVD (2010)
"April Fool"	Charlie Brown and Linus try to find their own courage.	iTunes (2008), DVD (2010)
"Crabby Little Girl"	Lucy asks everyone if she is a crabby person and gets honest answers, much to her chagrin.	iTunes (2008), DVD (2010)
"Mother's Day"	Lucy gives Linus orders from their mother, while Snoopy is in fear of getting his next rabies shot.	iTunes (2008), DVD (2010)
"All Your Faults"	Saying she wants to help him, Lucy provides Charlie Brown with a slide presentation of all his faults.	iTunes (2008), DVD (2010)
"Services Rendered"	Charlie Brown gets a bill from Lucy for her efforts to help him, while Snoopy promotes National Dog Week.	iTunes (2008), DVD (2010)
"The Good Brother"	Linus gets frustrated with Lucy as she constantly gets the upper hand in their sibling quibbles.	iTunes (2008), DVD (2010)
"Valentine Crush"	Charlie Brown is hoping the Little Red-Haired Girl gives him a Valentine's Day card.	iTunes (2008), DVD (2010)
