= In Their Skin =

- Directed by: Jeremy Power Regimbal
- Screenplay by: Joshua Close
- Story by: Joshua Close; Justin Tyler Close; Jeremy Power Regimbal
- Produced by: Justin Tyler Close; Jeremy Power Regimbal
- Starring: Selma Blair; Joshua Close; Rachel Miner; James D'Arcy; Alex Ferris; Quinn Lord
- Cinematography: Norm Li
- Edited by: Austin Andrews
- Music by: Keith Power
- Production companies: TSM Entertainment; Sepia Films; Telefilm Canada
- Distributed by: IFC Films; Kinosmith
- Release dates: April 21, 2012 (Tribeca Film Festival); September 11, 2012 (United States)
- Running time: 97 minutes
- Country: Canada
- Language: English
- Budget: $4 million

In Their Skin (also known in some countries as Replicas) is a 2012 Canadian home invasion thriller film directed by Jeremy Power Regimbal and starring Selma Blair, Joshua Close, Rachel Miner and James D'Arcy. The film is about a grieving family who escape to their cottage to reconnect. There, they are terrorized by neighbours with a sadistic agenda.

In Their Skin had its premiere at the Tribeca Film Festival on April 21, 2012, and was released theatrically in the United States by IFC Films and in Canada by Kinosmith on September 11, 2012. The film received mixed reviews from critics.

== Plot ==
A family escapes their busy lifestyles to their upscale suburban cottage. Wedded couple, Mary Hughes (Selma Blair), a real estate developer and Mark Hughes (Joshua Close), a lawyer, have an 8-year-old son, Brendon Hughes (Quinn Lord), but grieve over their recently dead 6-year-old daughter, Tess, who died in an accident. They also have a dog named Harris.

One night while out for a walk, they come across a vehicle, appearing as if they are being watched. The next day, they meet their neighbors, Jane Sakowski (Rachel Miner), Bobby Sakowski (James D'Arcy) and their 9-year-old son, Jared Sakowski (Alex Ferris), inviting them over for lunch.

That afternoon, the mood becomes unsettling when the Sakowskis bombard the Hughes with endless questions about their lives and overstay their welcome, envying their "perfect" wealthy living. After Brendon invites Jared to his room to defeat him playing games, Jared threatens him with a knife to his neck. This instills panic in Brendon, who flees to alert his parents. Jared pretends to his parents that he was punched by Brendon, which Brendon denies. After Mary finds marks on Brendon's neck, the Hughes dismiss the Sakowskis.

Mark is furious about what they encountered. He smashes a vase of flowers given to him by Jane, as it is witnessed by her husband Bobby through the kitchen window. When their dog, Harris, sets off into the woods for a walk, the Hughes hear the dog get shot and see a shooter emerge. They shift into lock down mode and Mark arms himself, while Mary searches for her phone to call the police. Mark soon finds his family vehicle has its tires punctured. Stepping outside, he sees Jared, who tells him Bobby is burying the dog. Jared runs off after using rocks to smash two windows of the Hughes cottage and almost hits Mark with one as well. Mark gives his hand gun to Mary and instructs her and Brendon to lock themselves in the bathroom while he goes out to search for their dog.

Taking a kitchen knife, Mark searches through the woods, but he is captured by Bobby and returned to the cottage where the rest of Sakowskis turn up. Bobby, carrying a shotgun, manipulates Mary and Brendon out of the bathroom, taking the hand gun from Mary. Mary pleads to take care of Jane if they let her family loose. However, Jane concedes to the family that Jared is her younger brother and they were removed out of a dark family life by Bobby, whose wife died of cancer, as Jane refuses to betray him. Bobby also reveals he raised his family in a run down station wagon and plans to assume the lives of the Hughes.

Abruptly, Mark's brother Toby (Matt Bellefleur) shows up at the cottage. The Hughes and Sakowskis put up a pretentious act of harmony. Jared holds Brendon hostage upstairs. After an awkward meeting with the Sakowskis, Toby goes to retrieve his bags from the car, and Bobby shoots him dead, leaving Mark and Mary emotional. The Sakowskis take control of the house, ordering Mark and Mary around, forcing them to perform sex in front of them. As Mary is forced to dry hump on top of Bobby, she stabs him with a knife, rendering him weak. The Hughes gain control shortly, but then Jared threatens Brendon at gun point. Later, Mark grabs his gun from Jared. A weakened Bobby says he wants to live the life of perfection, but Mark reveals his family is not perfect and that he killed his daughter in an accident. As Bobby tries to attack him, Mark shoots him dead. Mark consoles his family, and the rest of Sakowskis are taken into custody by the police. In the final scene, Mark and Mary are interviewed, showing they've drawn closer as a couple.

== Cast ==
- Selma Blair as Mary Hughes
- Joshua Close as Mark Hughes
- Rachel Miner as Jane Sakowski
- James D'Arcy as Bobby Sakowski
- Quinn Lord as Brendon Hughes
- Alex Ferris as Jared Sakowski
- Leanne Adachi as the Medic
- Matt Bellefleur as Toby
- Allie Bertram as Bridget
- Agam Darshi as the Nurse
- Brett Delaney as the Man in the headlights
- Debbe Hirata as the Therapist
- Terence Kelly as the Station Attendant

== Production ==
Filming took place in Fort Langley, British Columbia.

== Critical reception ==
In Their Skin received mixed reviews from film critics. As of March 21, 2013, Rotten Tomatoes reported that 45% of critics gave the film positive reviews, with an average score of 5.3/10, based upon a sample of 11 reviews.

== Accolades ==
| Year | Award | Category | Recipient | Result | Ref. |
|---|---|---|---|---|---|
| 2013 | Young Artist Award | Best Performance in a Feature Film - Supporting Young Actor | Alex Ferris | Nominated | |

== See also ==
- List of films featuring home invasions
