= Alex Ferris =

Canadian actor (born 1997)

- Born: Alexander Ferris; April 23, 1997 (age 29); Vancouver, British Columbia, Canada
- Occupation: Actor
- Years active: 2004–present
- Website: www.alexferris.ca

Alexander Ferris (born April 23, 1997) is a Canadian actor. He is best known for playing Billy Gornicke in the road film RV (2006), Victor Newton in the thriller film The Invisible (2007), Young Henry DeTamble in the drama film The Time Traveler's Wife (2009), and Collin Lee in the comedy film Diary of a Wimpy Kid (2010). Ferris is also the voice of Charlie Brown in Peanuts Motion Comics from 2008 to 2010, T.D. Kennelly in the PBS Kids animated TV series Martha Speaks and Paulie the Pliosaurus in the PBS Kids animated TV series Dinosaur Train.

== Early life ==
Ferris was born in Vancouver, British Columbia. He began acting at the age of seven after meeting another child actor on a family vacation, and writing to the actor's agent.

== Career ==
He appeared in the movie RV as Billy Gornicke, The Invisible as Victor Newton, Diary of a Wimpy Kid as Collin Lee and The Time Traveler's Wife as Young Henry DeTamble. He played in the Showtime Network's The L Word as Wilson Mann-Peabody, son of Helena. He also played Young Sam Winchester in the TV series Supernatural, episode "Something Wicked". In 2009, he appeared in an episode of Smallville entitled "Eternal" as a young Davis Bloome.

Ferris was the voice of T.D. Kennelly in the first four seasons of the television series Martha Speaks, Paulie the Pliosaurus in Dinosaur Train, Dreamfish in the Barbie animated movie Barbie in A Mermaid Tale, and Charlie Brown in Peanuts Motion Comics in 2008.

In 2016, he starred as Astrov in Timothy Koh's production of Uncle Vanya at the 440 Studios Black Box.

== Filmography ==
=== Film ===
Year	Title	Role	Notes
2006	RV	Billy Gornicke	
2006	X-Men: The Last Stand	Minivan Son #2	
2006	Memory	Ricky McHale	
2007	The Invisible	Victor Newton	
2009	The Time Traveler's Wife	Henry at Six	
2009	Battlestar Galactica: The Plan	Boy	Direct-to-video
2010	Tooth Fairy	Shelter Cove Kid	
2010	Barbie in a Mermaid Tale	Dreamfish	Voice
2010	Diary of a Wimpy Kid	Collin	
2010	Daydream Nation	Kid #1	
2012	In Their Skin	Jared	
2019	37-Teen	Trent	

=== Television ===
Year	Title	Role	Notes
2004	The Five People You Meet in Heaven	Boy	Television film; uncredited
2005	Stargate SG-1	Andy Spencer	Episode: "Citizen Joe"
2005	Terminal City	Angelic Boy	5 episodes
2005–2006	Firehouse Tales	Milkie	15 episodes
2005–2007	The L Word	Wilson	7 episodes
2006	Supernatural	Young Sam Winchester	Episode: "Something Wicked"
2006	Fallen	Stevie Corbett	Television film
2006	Masters of Horror	Mikey Reddle	Episode: "The Damned Thing"
2007	Passion's Web	Kevin	Television film
2007	JPod	Connor Lefkowitz	2 episodes
2008	Peanuts Motion Comics	Charlie Brown	Television shorts
2008–2013	Martha Speaks	T.D. Kennelly, Milo Lee	30 episodes
2009	Smallville	Young Davis Bloome	Episode: "Eternal"
2009	Living Out Loud	Ben Marshall	Television film
2009	Harper's Island	Henry	Episode: "Sign"
2009	Dinosaur Train	Petey	Episode: "One Smart Dinosaur/Petey the Peteinosaurus"
2010–2011	Eureka	Kid on the Street / Boy	2 episodes
2011	Hunt for the I-5 Killer	Eric Kominek	Television film
2011	Sanctuary	Young Will	Episode: "Homecoming"
2012	Superbook	Zechariah	Episode: "The Ten Commandments"
2012	A Killer Among Us	Sean Carleton	Television film
2014	A Wife's Nightmare	Sean	Television film
2015	Cedar Cove	Michael Ford	Episode: "Batter Up"
2015	Signed, Sealed, Delivered: Truth Be Told	Alex	Television film

== Awards and nominations ==
Year	Award	Category	Nominated work	Result
2008	Young Artist Awards	Best Performance in a Feature Film – Supporting Young Actor (Fantasy or Drama)	The Invisible	Nominated
2009	Young Artist Awards	Best Performance in a Voice-Over Role – Young Actor	Martha Speaks	Nominated
2010	Young Artist Awards	Best Performance in a TV Movie, Miniseries or Special – Supporting Young Actor	Living Out Loud	Won
2010	Young Artist Awards	Best Performance in a Feature Film – Supporting Young Actor	The Time Traveler's Wife	Nominated
2011	Young Artist Awards	Best Performance in a Feature Film – Supporting Young Actor	Diary of a Wimpy Kid	Nominated
2011	Young Artist Awards	Best Performance in a Feature Film – Young Ensemble Cast (shared with the cast)	Diary of a Wimpy Kid	Won
2013	Young Artist Awards	Best Performance in a Feature Film – Supporting Young Actor	In Their Skin	Nominated
