= Claire Corlett =

Canadian actress (born 1999)

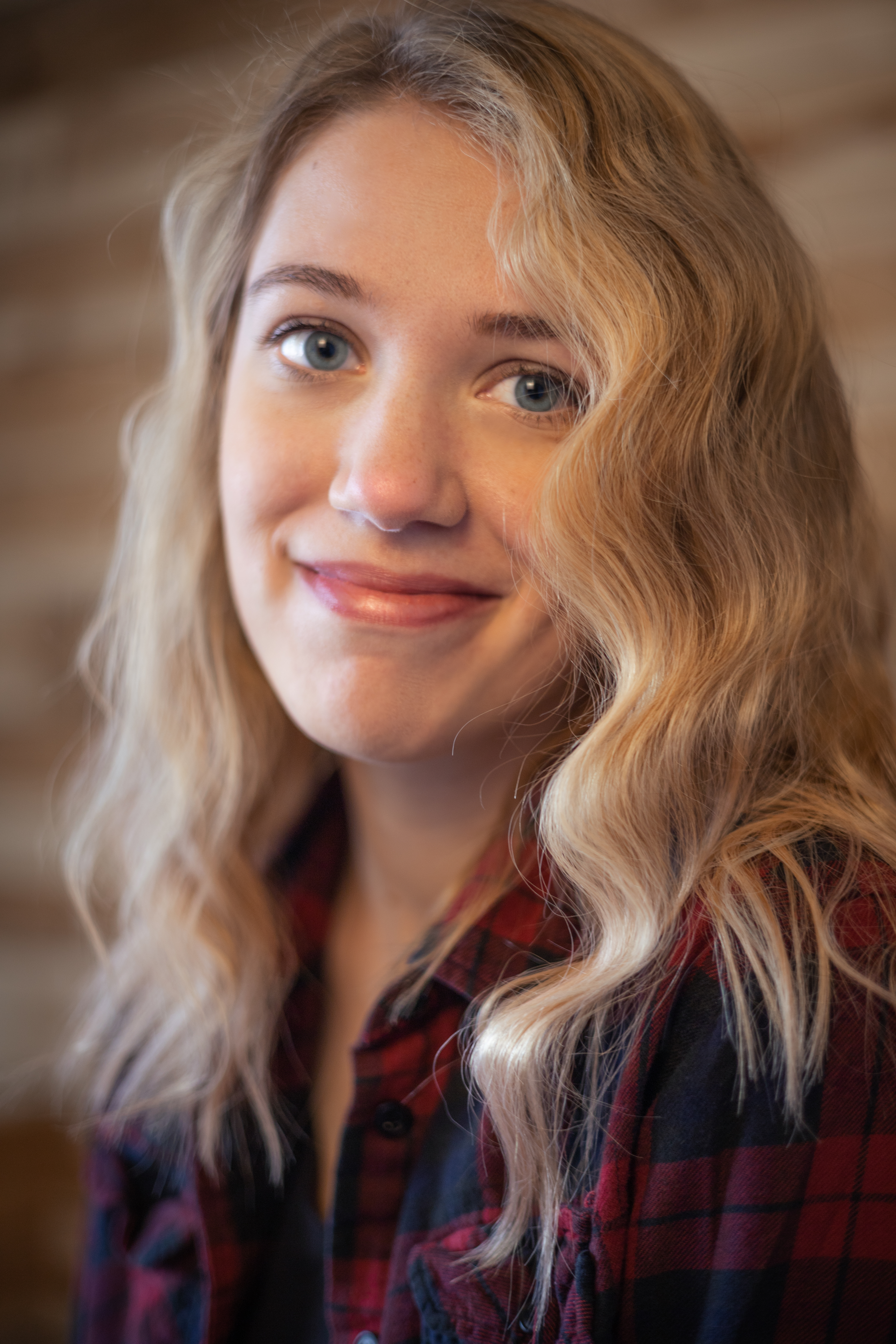
- Corlett in 2021
- Born: Claire Margaret Corlett; July 9, 1999 (age 27); Vancouver, British Columbia, Canada
- Education: University of British Columbia (BFA)
- Occupation: Actress
- Years active: 2005–present
- Known for: My Little Pony: Friendship Is Magic as Sweetie Belle
- Spouse: Gabriel C. Brown (m. 2022)
- Father: Ian James Corlett
- Musical career
- Genre: Pop
- Instrument: Vocals
- Website: www.clairemargaretcorlett.com

Claire Margaret Corlett Brown (born July 9, 1999) is a Canadian actress and singer, known most notably for providing the voice of Sweetie Belle in the animated television series My Little Pony: Friendship Is Magic. She is the daughter of voice actor Ian James Corlett.

== Career ==
Corlett is best known for voicing Sweetie Belle in the animated television series My Little Pony: Friendship Is Magic, Michelle in 3-2-1 Penguins!, and Tiny in Dinosaur Train. She was first introduced to voice acting when her father Ian James Corlett made her a demo when she was five years old. She is also the younger sister of voice actor Philip Corlett, who was the original voice of Buddy in Dinosaur Train.

Corlett's first voice acting role was as a preschooler in an episode of Being Ian, an animated series created by her father and based on his life.

Corlett collaborated on Smart Cookies with actress Michelle Creber, who also worked on My Little Pony: Friendship Is Magic as the voice of Apple Bloom.

== Personal life ==
Corlett was born in Vancouver, British Columbia. She attended the University of British Columbia for Creative Writing before dropping out in 2019.

After having lived in Los Angeles, California, she currently lives in Tucson, Arizona.

Corlett is married to Gabriel Brown, known as his internet alias Black Gryph0n, a fellow musician and voice actor who she met while working on My Little Pony: Friendship Is Magic when she was 14 and he was 24. The two were engaged on January 29, 2022, married on November 12, and currently live in Arizona.

She became an American citizen in 2024.

== Filmography ==
=== Animation ===
List of voice performances in animation
Year	Title	Role	Notes	Source
2007–2008	3-2-1 Penguins!	Michelle Conrad	Seasons 2 and 3	
2008	Peanuts Motion Comics	Sally Brown		
2009–2020	Dinosaur Train	Tiny Pteranodon		
2011–2019	My Little Pony: Friendship Is Magic	Sweetie Belle, additional voices	BTVA People's Choice Voice Acting Award [Winner] Best Female Vocal Performance by a Child as the voice of "Sweetie Belle"; Behind the Voice Actors Awards 2013	
2013	My Little Pony: Equestria Girls	Sweetie Belle	Uncredited	
2015–2017	Bob the Builder	Dizzy (US)	Main cast	
2017	My Little Pony: Better Together	Sweetie Belle		
2017	My Little Pony: Equestria Girls - Tales of Canterlot High	Sweetie Belle		
2017–2019	My Little Pony: Equestria Girls - Summertime Shorts	Sweetie Belle		
2019	Didn't I Say to Make My Abilities Average in the Next Life?!	Mavis von Austien	Anime English voice dub	
2020–2021	My Little Pony: Pony Life	Sweetie Belle		
2021	Novelmore	Gwynn		
2022	Dragons: Rescue Riders	Blazo	Peacock original series based on How to Train Your Dragon	

List of voice performances in direct-to-video and television films
Year	Title	Role	Notes	Source
2013	Barbie & Her Sisters in a Pony Tale	Stacie		
2015	Barbie & Her Sisters in The Great Puppy Adventure	Stacie		
2016	Barbie & Her Sisters in A Puppy Chase	Stacie		
2016	Journey to GloE	Lilly		
2017	Barbie Dolphin Magic	Stacie		

=== Live action ===
List of acting performances in film and television
Year	Title	Role	Notes	Source
2012	Smart Cookies	Frank (Francine), Mabel	Hallmark TV movie	resume
2017	Before I Fall	Devil Cupid		
2022	Superheroes Forever	Sugar Rush (Sandra)		

=== Video games ===
Year	Title	Role	Notes
2018	Dragalia Lost	Pia	
