= Michelle Creber =

Canadian actress (born 1999)

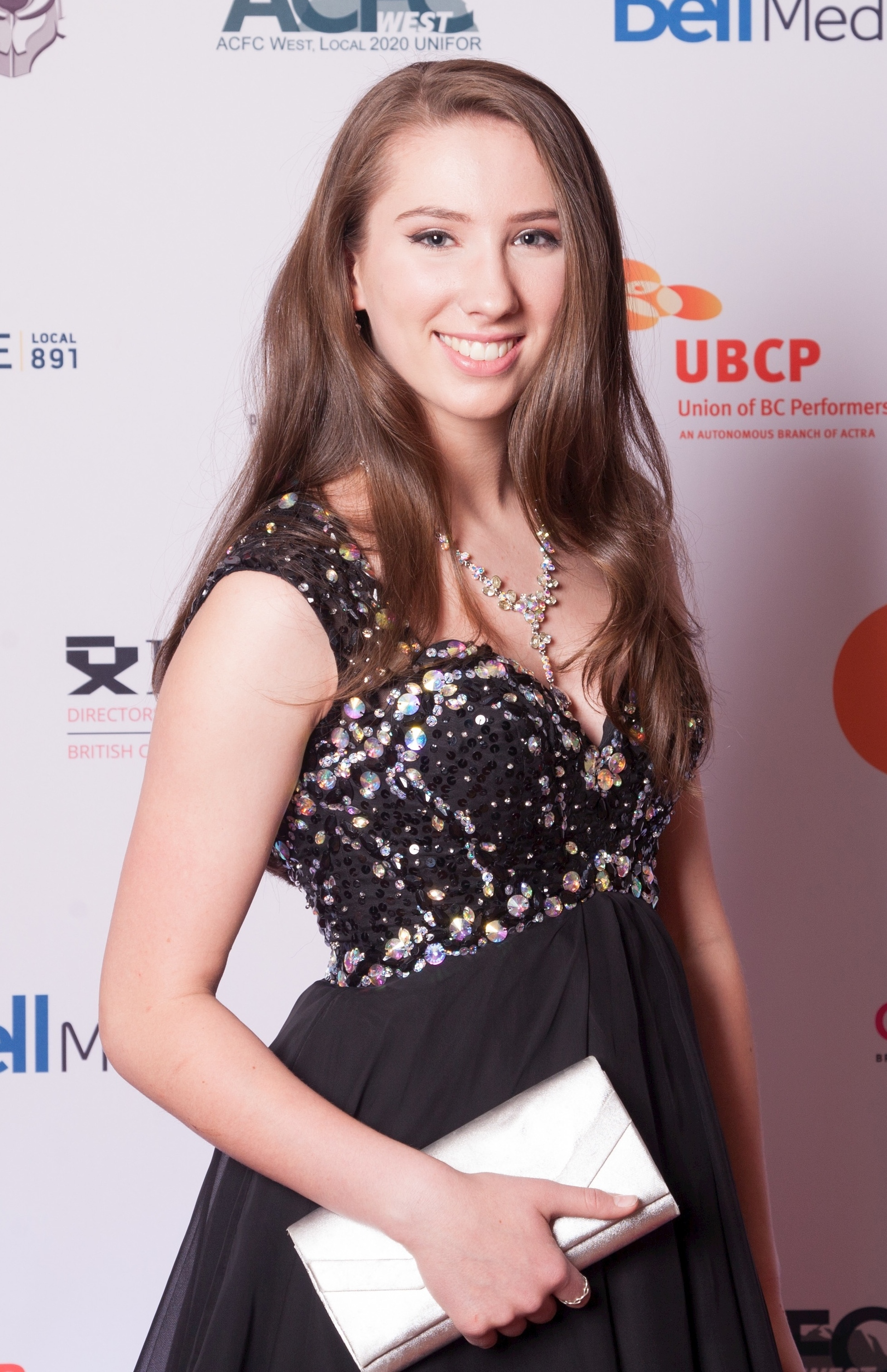
- Creber at the 2015 Leo Awards
- Born: Michelle Nicole Creber; September 7, 1999 (age 27); Vancouver, British Columbia, Canada
- Occupations: Actress; singer
- Years active: 2007–present
- Website: michellecreber.com

Michelle Nicole Creber (born September 7, 1999) is a Canadian actress and singer.

== Biography ==
Michelle Creber was born to jazz pianist/producer Michael Creber and vocalist/producer Monique Creber. She first appeared on stage singing at the age of four and began acting at the age of seven, appearing as Lucy in Charlie Brown/Peanuts Motion Comics (Warner Bros).

On August 28, 2012, Creber released her first solo album entitled Timeless: Songs of a Century. In 2012, she followed up the release with A Creber Christmas, with parents Monique and Michael. The album At Home (an acoustic collection of covers and originals featuring the Crebers, Gabriel C. Brown, and Andrea Libman), was released in 2014; in 2015, Creber and Brown (aka Black Gryph0n) released Tribute: Celebrating the Music of Michael Jackson; and in 2016, the duo released Getting Stronger, a hit album of original songs. On June 1, 2018, Creber released her first solo-all originals album On Display. In May 2020, Creber released her second full-length, all-originals album Storm. Creber has released several singles since her Storm album including Feels Like Summer, a co-write with Christopher Ward (writer of the hit Black Velvet), Arun Chaturvedi and Luke McMaster.

Key voiceover credits include Apple Bloom in My Little Pony: Friendship is Magic (Hasbro), Bonzle in Ninjago: Dragons Rising (Netflix), Alice in Martha Speaks (PBS Kids) and Wendy Darling in the New Adventures of Peter Pan (Discovery Family). Notable onscreen credits include Kelly in Strange Empire (CBC/Netflix), Supernatural (CW), Yellowjackets (Showtime), Tracker (CBS), Smart Cookies (Hallmark) and The Search for Santa Paws (Disney). Creber has also performed extensively in the theatre world with many lead roles, including the title role of Annie and "Jo March" in Little Women.

As a singer, Creber has recorded soundtrack vocals for dozens of TV shows and movies. Lead singing features include the theme song for NBC's Nina's World; multiple songs on Nintendo's popular franchise Yo-kai Watch, LEGO Friends: The Next Chapter and Netflix's Johnny Test; several songs during the nine seasons of My Little Pony: Friendship Is Magic; and a soundtrack duet with Billy Joel for the movie Just The Way You Are.

== Filmography ==
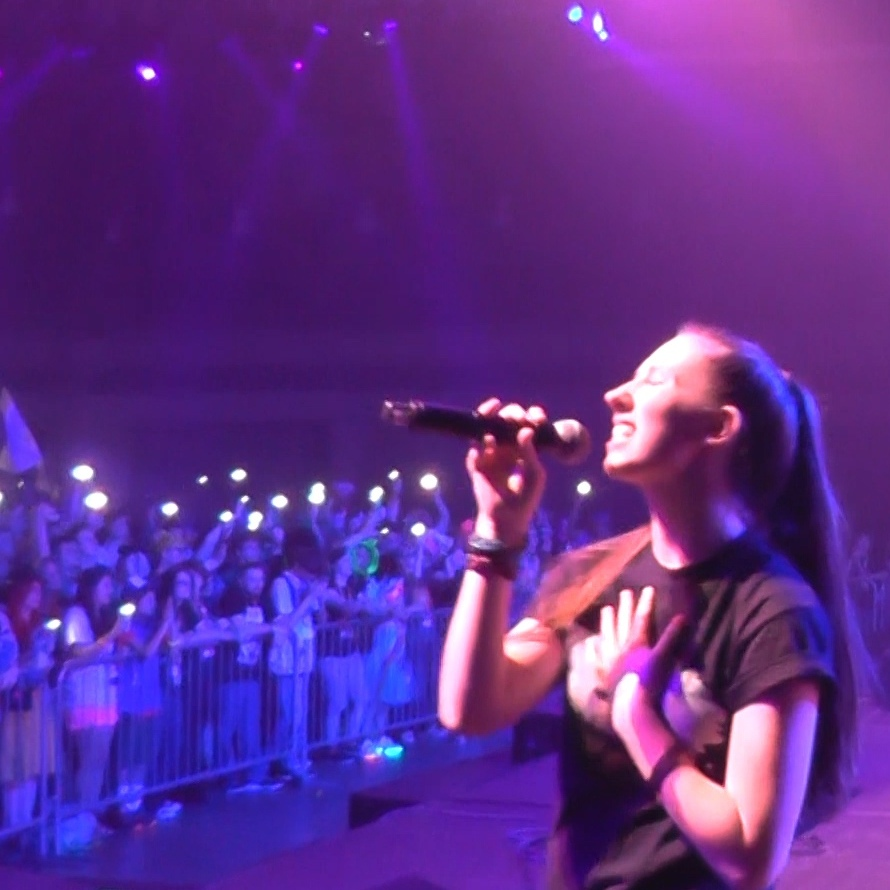
Creber live in concert (2016)

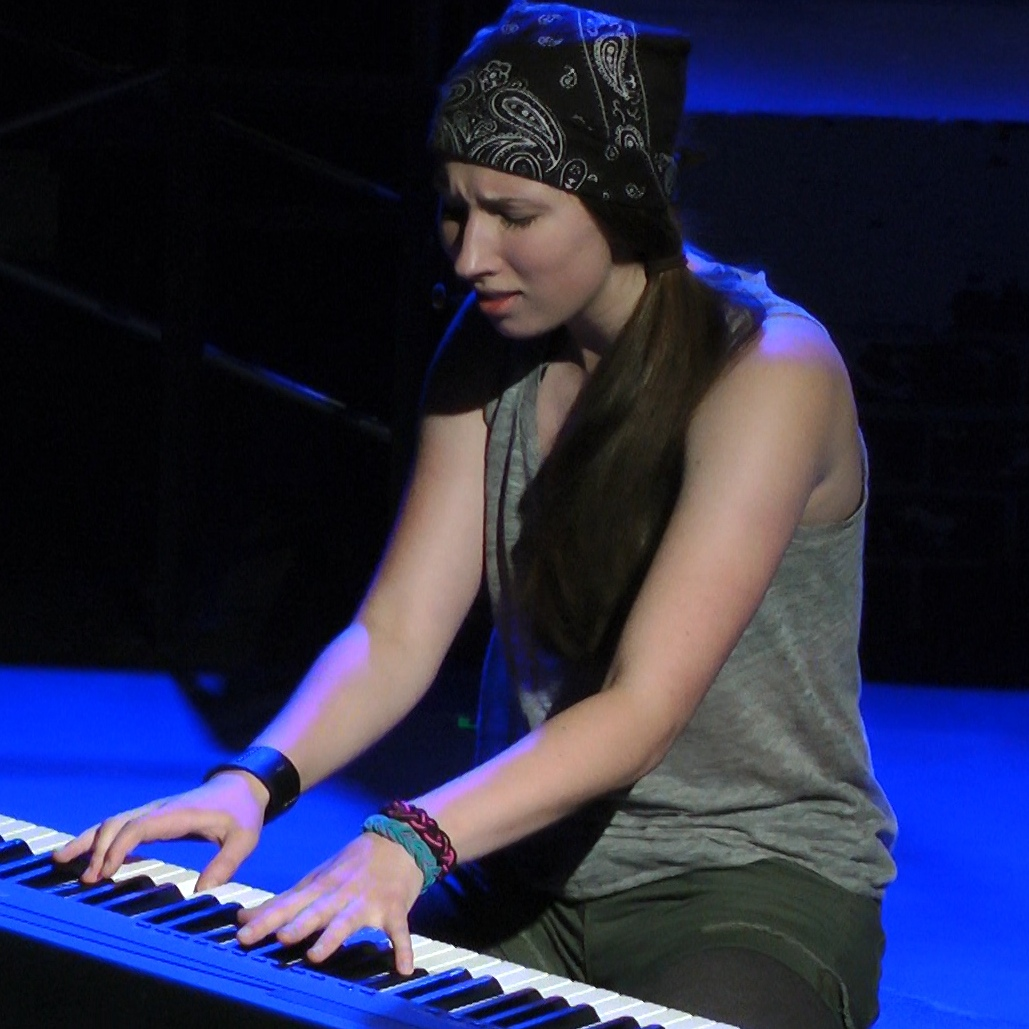
Creber performing in the musical FAME (Vancouver, BC, 2016)

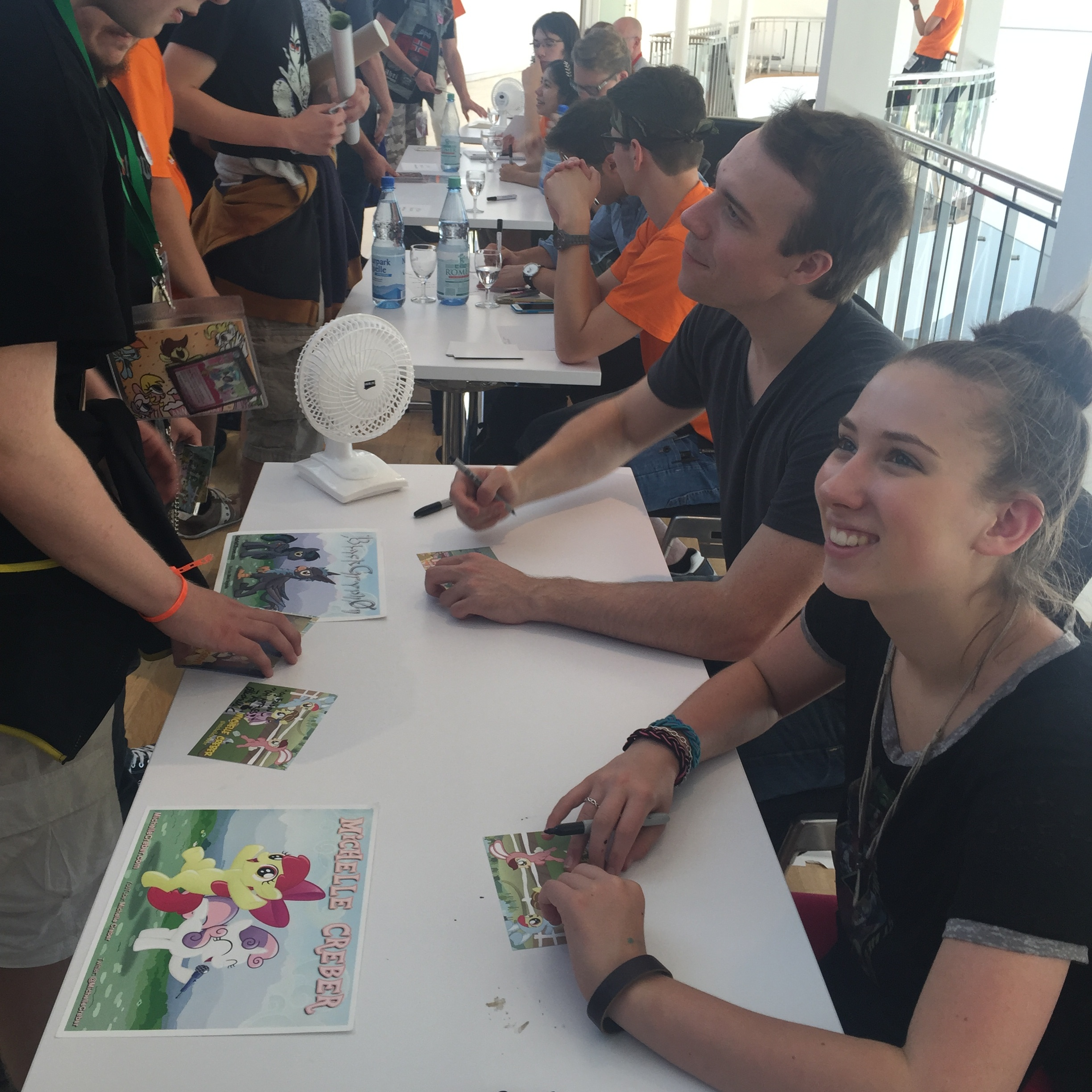
Creber and Gabriel Brown signing autographs at Galacon (Germany, 2015)

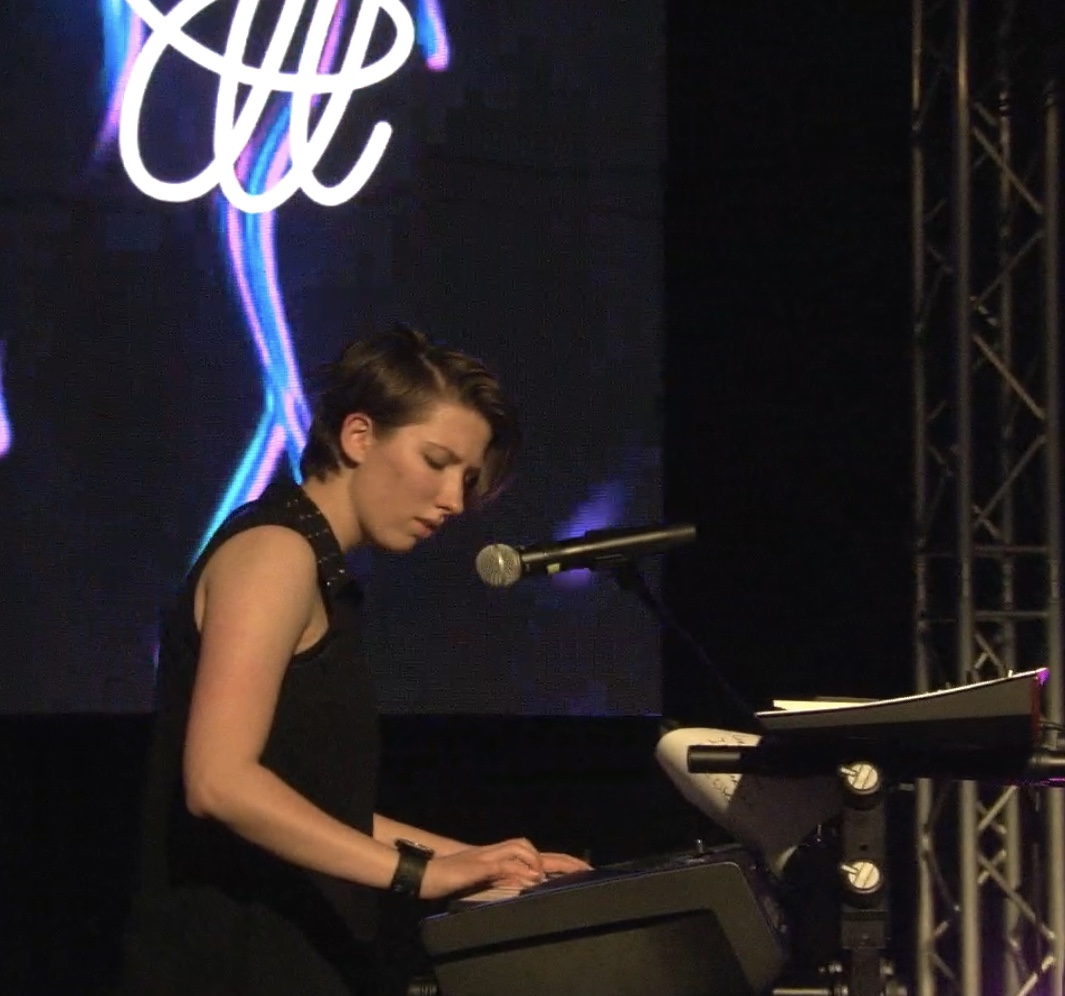
Creber live in concert (2021)

=== Animation ===
Year	Title	Role	Notes
2008	Peanuts Motion Comics	Lucy	
2009	The Adventures of Little Jake and Many Skies	Little Jake	
2010–2019	My Little Pony: Friendship Is Magic	Apple Bloom, Sweetie Belle (singing voice until 2013), additional voices	
2010	Dinosaur Train	Teri, Michelle	
2011	Barbie: A Perfect Christmas	Chelsea	Motion Capture
2012–2013	Martha Speaks	Alice Boxwood (Season 4)	
2012–2016	The New Adventures of Peter Pan	Wendy Darling	
2013	My Little Pony: Equestria Girls	Apple Bloom	Uncredited
2014	Equestria Girls: Rainbow Rocks	Apple Bloom	
2015	Nina's World	Lead singer for Nina's World theme song	
2016	Tooth and Tail	Nomads of the North (Lizards)	Video game
2017	My Little Pony: The Movie	Apple Bloom	
2019	My Little Pony: Equestria Girls – Holidays Unwrapped	Apple Bloom	
2020–2021	My Little Pony: Pony Life	Apple Bloom	
2022	Johnny Test	Dukey Channel Intro Singers, Animatronic Back-Up Singer	2 episodes
2023–2024	Ninjago: Dragons Rising	Bonzle	
2024	Dead Dead Demon's Dededede Destruction	Kimika Ando	
2026	Dandy's World: Queens of Mischief	Connie	Music video

=== Live action ===
Year	Title	Role	Notes
2010	The Search for Santa Paws	Taylor	
2010	Daydream Nation	Girl	
2010	Supernatural	Hilary	Episode: "Appointment in Samarra"
2010	Eureka	Radical Raccoon Teammate	
2011–2014	R.L. Stine's The Haunting Hour	Amelia (episode: Dreamcatcher); Jacquelyn (episode: Spores)	Nominated - Joey Award for Best Actress in Guest Starring Role (2015)
2011	Christmas Lodge	Charlene	
2012	Killer Among Us	Ellie	Won - Joey Award for Young Actress in a Made for TV Supporting Role (2014)
2012	Smart Cookies	Mattie	
2012–present	Saturday Night Songs	Herself (only on the Everfree Network)	
2013–present	Speedy and Stretch	Various (on the Everfree Network and YouTube)	Nominated - Joey Award for Young Actress in a Lead Role in a Web-Based Series (2014)
2014	Patterson's Wager	Otter	Won - Oregon Independent Film Festival: Best Supporting Actress (2015) Nominated - Joey Award for Best Actress in a Feature Film Supporting Role (2015)
2014	BlackGryph0n's 50,000 Subscriber Special	Herself (Video)	
2014	#TweetIt: Featuring My Little Pony Staff and Bronies	Herself (Music Video)	
2014–2015	Strange Empire	Kelly	Nominated – Leo Award for Best Supporting Performance by a Female in a Dramatic Series (2015) Nominated – Joey Award for Best Actress in a TV Drama Leading Role (2015)
2016	Date with Love	Bree	
2019	Shall We Play	Emma	
2020–2021	A Million Little Things	Jenna	
2022	When I Think of Christmas	Lynette	
2023	Yellowjackets	Maddy	
2023	Making Waves	Mary	Featuring the original single "Feels Like Summer"
2024	Danger in the Dorm	Sarah	
2024	Tracker	Rachel	

=== Musicals ===
- 2008 – A Christmas Carol – Tiny Tim
- 2009 – Annie – Annie (EV Young Award: Most Outstanding Performance)
- 2009 – Grease – Kenickie
- 2010 – Guys and Dolls – Nicely-Nicely Johnson
- 2010 – The Sound of Music – Brigitta Von Trapp
- 2010 – Annie – Annie
- 2011 – The Wonderful Wizard of Oz – Dorothy Gale
- 2016 – Fame – Lambchops (Ovation Award: Outstanding Performance in a Musical)
- 2017 – 13: The Musical – Lucy
- 2017 – Little Women: The Broadway Musical – Jo

== Discography ==
- Timeless: Songs of a Century (2012) – feat. Daniel Ingram, Natalie Sharp & Yoav Landau (The Living Tombstone)
- A Creber Christmas (2012) with Michael & Monique Creber / feat. Natalie Sharp
- At Home (2014) with Gabriel C. Brown (Black Gryph0n), Andrea Libman, Michael Creber & Monique Creber
- "Zero Gravity" (2014) feat. Gabriel C. Brown (Black Gryph0n) and Nathanael Brown (Baasik); included on the latter pair's album IMmortal
- Tribute: Celebrating the Music of Michael Jackson (2015) with Gabriel C. Brown
- Getting Stronger (2016) with Gabriel C. Brown
- On Display (2018) feat. Gabriel C. Brown & Natalie Sharp
- Work in Progress (2019)
- Storm (2020)
- Michelle & Claire's Spectacular, Stupendous, Spookalicous Halloween EP (2020) with Claire Corlett (Digital Only)
- A Creber Christmas Vol. 2 (Let There Be Peace) (2020) (Digital Only)

== See also ==
- My Little Pony: Friendship Is Magic
- My Little Pony: Friendship Is Magic fandom
- BronyCon
