= My Little Pony: Make Your Mark =

Animated streaming television series

- Genre: Fantasy; Comedy
- Based on: My Little Pony by Bonnie Zacherle & My Little Pony: A New Generation by Robert Cullen, José Luis Ucha and Tim Sullivan
- Developed by: Gillian Berrow
- Directed by: Will Lau
- Voices of: Jenna Warren; Ana Sani; J.J. Gerber; Maitreyi Ramakrishnan; AJ Bridel; Rob Tinkler; Athena Karkanis; Bahia Watson
- Theme music composer: Igor Correia; Jeff Milutinovic
- Opening theme: "Make Your Mark"
- Composers: Sean James Boyer; Ben Pinkerton
- Country of origin: Canada
- Original language: English
- No. of seasons: 4
- No. of episodes: 27

Production
- Executive producers: Olivier Dumont; Randi Yaffa; Cort Lane
- Running time: 22 minutes; 44 minutes (specials)
- Production company: Entertainment One

Original release
- Network: Netflix
- Release: May 26, 2022 – November 23, 2023

Related
- My Little Pony: A New Generation (2021); My Little Pony (1986–1987); My Little Pony Tales (1992); My Little Pony: Friendship Is Magic (2010–2019); My Little Pony: Tell Your Tale (2022-2024)

My Little Pony: Make Your Mark is a Canadian animated television series tied to the fifth incarnation (also referred to as the fifth generation or "G5") of Hasbro's My Little Pony toyline. Set after the events of the 2021 Netflix film My Little Pony: A New Generation, the series follows five ponies—Sunny Starscout (Jenna Warren), an idealistic earth pony; Izzy Moonbow (Ana Sani), a creative unicorn; Hitch Trailblazer (J.J. Gerber), a responsible earth pony; and sisters Zipp Storm (Maitreyi Ramakrishnan) and Pipp Petals (AJ Bridel), two pegasi princesses—on their adventures and battles across Equestria. The ponies are joined later on by Misty Brightdawn, a shy unicorn and former associate of the villainous alicorn Opaline Arcana.

Developed by Gillian Berrow for Netflix, the 44-minute special episode Make Your Mark premiered as a teaser on May 26, 2022, followed by the release of eight further episodes on September 26. The series is produced by Entertainment One with animation provided by Atomic Cartoons, and a total of four 44-minute special episodes and twenty-three 22-minute episodes were ordered.

The sixth and final chapter was released on November 23, 2023.

== Premise ==
Many generations after the end of My Little Pony: Friendship is Magic, wherein Twilight Sparkle became the ruler of Equestria, the "New Mane Six"—Sunny Starscout, Izzy Moonbow, Hitch Trailblazer, the sisters Pipp Petals and Zipp Storm, and newcomer Misty Brightdawn—live in Maretime Bay after having brought back magic to the world. Sunny's home, the Crystal Brighthouse, now holds the Unity Crystals, magical objects created by Twilight to save the ponies of Equestria from the evil fire alicorn, Opaline Arcana. The three pony types—unicorns, pegasuses, and earth ponies—have been reunited, but still face some obstacles in living together and dealing with their newfound magic.

Sunny and her friends go on adventures and live life, and their friendship grows as they learn to understand each other's differences and deal with various challenges. Meanwhile, the immortal alicorn Opaline, weakened and forgotten by the world, desires to take all the magic in Equestria for herself and rule the land. She sends her unicorn assistant Misty, who knows little about the world outside Opaline's castle, to spy on Sunny and her friends in furtherance of Opaline's plans as she promised to give Misty her own cutie mark, a symbol that appears on a ponies' flank when they discover their special talent. Misty is rarely successful, but sometimes finds herself enjoying life in Maretime Bay and begins to discover that the outside world is broader than Opaline has told her. As the series progresses, Opaline devises a range of plans to strengthen her own magic in preparation to mount an assault on Equestria.

== Voice cast ==
=== Main ===
- Jenna Warren as Sunny Starscout, (Note: Sunny Starscout was previously voiced by Vanessa Hudgens in A New Generation.) a bright-eyed earth pony/alicorn who runs a smoothie stand in Maretime Bay and seeks to make the world a better place.
- Ana Sani as Izzy Moonbow, (Note: Izzy Moonbow was previously voiced by Kimiko Glenn in A New Generation.) a happy-go-lucky unicorn from Bridlewood who enjoys arts and crafts.
- AJ Bridel as Philomena "Pipp" Petals, (Note: Pipp Petals was previously voiced by Sofia Carson in A New Generation.) a pegasus princess and pop singer from Zephyr Heights with a wide fan following, the owner of the Maretime Bay karaoke hair salon Mane Melody, and Zipp’s younger sister.
- J.J. Gerber as Hitch Trailblazer, (Note: Hitch Trailblazer was previously voiced by James Marsden in A New Generation.) an earth pony with an affinity for critters who serves as the sheriff of Maretime Bay.
- Maitreyi Ramakrishnan as Zephyrina "Zipp" Storm, (Note: Zipp Storm was previously voiced by Liza Koshy in A New Generation.) an athletic pegasus princess from Zephyr Heights appointed as a detective to investigate magical phenomena in Maretime Bay, and Pipp's older sister.
- Rob Tinkler as Sparky Sparkeroni, a male baby dragon with chaotic, powerful magic who is adopted by Hitch.
- Bahia Watson as Misty Brightdawn, a timid unicorn who was taken in by Opaline as a filly and serves as her assistant in return for a promised cutie mark. In Chapter 5, she is revealed to be Alphabittle's long lost daughter.

=== Villains ===
- Athena Karkanis as Opaline Arcana, a menacing fire alicorn who seeks to control all of Equestria and its magic. She is also Misty's adoptive mother but at the end of Chapter 6, she has her power taken from her and gets trapped in The Together Tree.
- Julie Lemieux as Allura, a winged snow leopard who has the power to hypnotize. At the end, she enters the portal to Equestria so as to not fail her brother.
- Rob Tinkler as Twitch, Allura's bunny sidekick.

=== Supporting ===
- Amanda Martinez as Queen Haven, (Note: Queen Haven was previously voiced by Jane Krakowski in A New Generation.) the ruler of Zephyr Heights, Pipp and Zipp's mother and Alphabittle's girlfriend.
- Kimberly-Ann Truong as Posey Bloom, an earth pony who distrusted magic at first, but grew to like it after receiving earth pony magic.
- Sara Garcia as Dahlia, an earth pony who is a florist and baker.
- Ana Sani as Windy, a pegasus who lives in Zephyr Heights and Maretime Bay.
- Samantha Bielanski as Jazz Hooves, an earth pony employed at Mane Melody as a manicurist and singer.
- Jonathan Tan as Rocky Riff, a pegasus employed at Mane Melody as a mane stylist and singer.
- Joshua Graham as Sprout Cloverleaf, (Note: Sprout was previously voiced by Ken Jeong in A New Generation.) the former deputy sheriff and one-time self-proclaimed emperor of Maretime Bay.
- Tara Strong as Twilight Sparkle, an alicorn who was the Princess of Friendship and the ruler of Equestria. She appears through a hologram in the Brighthouse.
- Elley-Ray Hennessy as Figgy, an earth pony who lives in a cottage near Maretime Bay, and is Hitch's grandmother.
- Andrew Jackson as Alphabittle Blossomforth, (Note: Alphabittle Blossomforth was previously voiced by Phil LaMarr in A New Generation.) a unicorn who runs the Crystal Tea Room in Bridlewood and is Queen Haven's boyfriend. In Chapter 5, he is revealed to be Misty's father.
- AJ Bridel as Onyx, (Note: Onyx was previously voiced by Lisa Linder Silver in A New Generation, credited as "Beatnik Unicorn".) a beatnik unicorn who writes and performs poetry at the Crystal Tea Room in Bridlewood. She often appears alongside her partner Dapple who accompanies her on bongos.
- Elena Juatco as Minty, the lead singer of the Dreamlands, an earth pony girl group that reunites after a breakup to perform at the Bridlewoodstock music festival.
- Stacey Kay as Blue Belle, another member of the Dreamlands.
- Lexie Galante as Snuzzle, another member of the Dreamlands.
- Sofia Wylie as Ruby Jubilee, a popular pegasus singer who performs at Bridlewoodstock.
- Kaia Oz as Seashell, an earth pony filly who is friends with Glory and Peach Fizz and one of Pipp's fans, the Pippsqueaks.
- Athena Karkanis as Glory, a pegasus filly who is friends with Seashell and Peach Fizz and one of Pipp's fans, the Pippsqueaks.
- Bahia Watson as Peach Fizz, a unicorn filly who is friends with Seashell and Glory and one of Pipp's fans, the Pippsqueaks.
- Unknown as Toots, (Note: Toots was previously voiced by Arturo Hernández in A New Generation.) an earth pony stallion and former CanterLogic employee.
- Tymika Tafari as Sweets, (Note: Sweets was previously voiced by Brooke Goldner in A New Generation.) an earth pony mare and former CanterLogic employee.
- Amanda Martinez as Dazzle Feather, (Note: Dazzle Feather was previously voiced by Heather Langenkamp in A New Generation.) a pegasus mare who is a TV host in Zephyr Heights alongside Skye Silver.
- Jonathan Tan as Skye Silver, (Note: Skye Silver was previously voiced by Will Friedle in A New Generation.) a pegasus stallion who is a TV host in Zephyr Heights alongside Dazzle Feather.
- Athena Karkanis as Zoom Zephyrwing, (Note: Zoom Zephyrwing was previously voiced by Gillian Berrow in A New Generation.) a pegasus mare who is a royal guard and much more competent than her partner Thunder.
- Jonathan Tan as Thunder Flap, (Note: Thunder Flap was previously voiced by Arturo Hernández in A New Generation.) a pegasus stallion who is a royal guard and much more cowardly than his partner Zoom.
- Unknown as Sugar Moonlight, a female earth pony, who is the leader of the group called Filly Four along with Rosedust and Lily.
- Louisa Zhu as Blaize Skysong, a female dragon who lives on a large island called the Isle of Scaly.
- Julius Cho as Tumble, a male dragon who lives on a large island called the Isle of Scaly.
- Kris Siddiqi as Lava, a male dragon who lives on a large island called the Isle of Scaly but gets captured and mind controlled along with Jade by Opaline to rule Equestria for good.
- Evany Rosen as Violet Frost, a female Auroricorn who lives in a glittery wonderland called Starlight Ridge.
- Cory Doran as Comet, a male Auroricorn who lives in a glittery wonderland called Starlight Ridge.
- Martin Roach as Spike, a male dragon who was revered as a hero in ancient Equestria. He is the current Dragon Lord of the Dragon Lands.
- Sarah Gadon as Luxxe, a female dragon who lives on a large island called the Isle of Scaly.
- Anthony Sardinha as Leaf, a male dragon who lives on a large island called the Isle of Scaly.
- Leigh Cameron as Fountain, a female dragon who lives on a large island called the Isle of Scaly.
- Josette Jorge as Jade, a female dragon who lives on a large island called the Isle of Scaly but gets captured and mind controlled along with Lava by Opaline to rule Equestria for good.
- Lynne Griffin as Elder Flower, a female unicorn who lives in Bridlewood, who is a storyteller and is the great-great-great-great niece of Moon Dancer.
- Jonathan Tan as Dapple, a unicorn who accompanies his partner Onyx on bongos for her poetry at her performance at the Crystal Tea Room in Bridlewood.
- Kyle Gatehouse as Jasper, (Note: Jasper was previously voiced by Arturo Hernández in A New Generation.) a unicorn who lives in Bridlewood.
- TBA as Mayflower, (Note: Mayflower was previously voiced by Heather Langenkamp in A New Generation.) an earth pony who lives in Maretime Bay.

== Episodes ==
=== Series overview ===
Chapter	Episodes	Originally released
1	1	May 26, 2022
2	8	September 26, 2022
3	1	November 21, 2022
4	7	June 6, 2023
5	6	September 18, 2023
6	4	November 23, 2023

=== Chapter 1 (2022) ===
No. overall	No. in chapter	Title	Directed by	Written by	Original release date
1	1	"Make Your Mark"	Will Lau	Gillian M. Berrow	May 26, 2022
The three pony kinds now live together in harmony. However, earth ponies still lack magic, and some dislike the return of magic and find it unfair. Sunny struggles to control her alicorn transformation. During the Maretime Bay Day festival, glitches in the magic and the discontent of earth ponies compound on each other. A pegasus falls onto an earth pony. As the ponies argue, their discord causes a storm to brew; the pegasuses and unicorns lose their magic powers, the earth ponies' hooves become stuck, and a void forms in the ground. Sunny is able to transform into an alicorn and flies into the void to rescue ponies who fell in, and the unicorns and pegasuses help the earth ponies regain mobility. Their unity causes magic to restabilize; the earth ponies now have magic of their own, and can manipulate plants. Hitch discovers he can now communicate with animals, and the large egg he found hatches into a baby dragon, who he names Sparky. Queen Haven allows Zipp to stay in Maretime Bay to follow her own pursuits, instead of returning to Zephyr Heights for royal duties. Elsewhere, Opaline and Misty watch the festival continue as they mastermind their plot.

=== Chapter 2 (2022) ===
No. overall	No. in chapter	Title	Directed by	Written by	Original release date
2	1	"Izzy Does It"	Will Lau	Jim Martin	September 26, 2022
Izzy makes a bracelet for Sunny as a birthday present, but Sunny decides to wear it as a mane decoration instead. At the Maretime Bay Craft Fair, Pipp makes a viral post about Sunny's new accessory. Izzy panics, unsure if she will be able to make more bracelets for the ponies that now want them. Pipp tells Izzy that she produces new works by making "the same thing, but better", and performs a new song. Both Izzy and Pipp then struggle with creative block. Misty spies on the Mane Five and plants an enchanted mirror as a "present" for Sunny. She informs Opaline of the presence of earth pony magic, and Opaline decides to begin their plan, reassuring her that when it is complete, she will finally earn her cutie mark. Traveling to Bridlewood for inspiration, Izzy comes across a rusty old motor scooter. She refurbishes it and adds a trailer to hold her crafting supplies, allowing her to move them out of the closet in the Crystal Brighthouse, which was cramping her style. When Sunny and her friends try out the mirror, Opaline discovers that the Brighthouse's magical protection prevents her from spying inside it. With newfound inspiration, Izzy produces a remixed version of Pipp's song.
3	2	"Growing Pains"	Will Lau	Julia Prescott	September 26, 2022
Sprout causes mayhem by accidentally growing a giant berry which rolls down the street. Hitch starts banning earth ponies from using plant magic, but this only causes the magic to build up and become uncontrollable. Hitch decides to separate the earth pony crystal from the unicorn and pegasus crystals, and an alarmed Sunny protests. The crystal judders energetically when Hitch touches it, and Hitch abandons the effort. When his friends reassure him that they will be able to resolve the problem, a pre-recorded hologram of Twilight Sparkle appears from the crystals, warning them that "evil forces" seek to manipulate and steal the magic of Equestria. Elsewhere, Opaline explains to Misty that she wants earth pony magic to grow more powerful, so that it will be even stronger when they take it for themselves. Hitch rescinds the ban, and the earth ponies learn to control their abilities. Sprout grows another giant berry, but this time Sunny and her friends use their magic together to grow a tree that stops the berry. Hitch remarks that Sparky seems unusually happy, having left Izzy to watch over him for the day. Izzy replies that she completely ignored Hitch's guidelines for Sparky's care, as a less restrictive approach worked better.
4	3	"Portrait of a Princess"	Will Lau	Janae Hall	September 26, 2022
On Royal Portrait Day, Zipp ignores Pipp's preparations and tries to focus on investigating Twilight's holographic message instead. Opaline overhears Zipp on Pipp's livestream. Queen Haven arrives at Mane Melody, and she and Pipp begin their facials, but Zipp wants an excuse to get out. The sisters sneak out and go to the beach after Misty sends them photos of a rare flower called an ocean lily: Pipp is interested in taking photos with it, and Zipp gets caught up in searching for it. Misty lures them into a cave using a petal trail, and the sisters are trapped by a rockfall. They continue arguing, but Zipp apologizes and admits she has been selfish. They sing their childhood Portrait Day song and reconcile; Pipp apologizes in return for being on her phone too much. Zipp finds an opening in the cave's ceiling, allowing Pipp to get a signal on her phone and seek help. Pipp's fans quickly come to help them escape, and they leave with an ocean lily. They arrive at Zephyr Heights late and dishevelled, but Queen Haven is pleased to see the flower, and they pose for their portrait. After Misty's failure, Opaline wants to intervene herself.
5	4	"Ali-Conned"	Randi Rodrigues	Kelly D'Angelo	September 26, 2022
Sunny skates into town to promote a cause: healthy eating. Everypony ignores her activism, but Sunny transforms into an alicorn while passionately talking. Ponies are suddenly interested in alicorn Sunny, and some now want to help her causes. Through the mirror, Opaline discovers Sunny's power, and she decides she wants Sunny on her side. Misty joins a group of popular influencers, the Filly Four, whose popularity distresses Pipp. They ask alicorn Sunny to hang out with them. Opaline, posing as Sunny's inner voice, tells her through the mirror that alicorns are special and that she should harness her alicorn power. Misty tells Sunny she deserves to be treated like royalty, but Sunny feels uncomfortable when actually given special treatment; and when she becomes an earth pony again, she becomes upset that the ponies apparently no longer care about her or her causes. Sunny's friends reveal to her the new community garden in front of the Brighthouse, built after they were inspired by her activism. Sunny theorizes that she only becomes an alicorn when "truly helping somepony". Pipp's chaotic videos filmed by Sparky have gone viral, and she too learns that others will like her for who she truly is.
6	5	"The Cutie Mark Mix-Up"	Will Lau	Jim Martin	September 26, 2022
On opening day, the visiting ponies in Sunny's new community garden disturb the nearby wildlife and trample plants. Distressed animals and birds rush into the Brighthouse; Hitch and the others have trouble controlling them. Amidst the commotion, Opaline conjures a magical mouse to spy inside. Sunny and Hitch, both frustrated, argue over whose job is tougher. Sparky magically causes their cutie marks—and personalities—to switch. Zipp notices that both of them are behaving strangely, and points out that their cutie marks are switched. Sunny and Hitch decide to do each other's jobs, and they each find out that their tasks are not as easy as they might seem: Hitch is unable to make good smoothies by strictly following the recipes, and the animals ignore Sunny when she talks to them. After Zipp tells each of them that the other needs help, they find each other, apologize and reaffirm their friendship, which causes their cutie marks to switch back. Opaline's mouse finds Sunny's lantern; its magical light matches that of the Unity Crystals. Sparky pounces on the mouse, and it disappears. Izzy, Zipp and Pipp build a "critter corner" in the Brighthouse for creatures to take refuge from the community garden's activity.
7	6	"The Traditional Unicorn Sleep-Over"	Randi Rodrigues	Julia Prescott	September 26, 2022
Izzy befriends Misty and invites her to a sleepover at the Crystal Brighthouse, planning a night filled with traditional Bridlewood activities. Opaline orders Misty to steal Sunny's lantern, believing that it holds the secret to restoring her magic. During the sleepover, Misty behaves strangely and shows no knowledge of Bridlewood culture, causing Zipp to become suspicious of her. Misty eventually flees the Brighthouse, crushing Izzy's spirits as she had hoped to spend the night remembering all the things she loves about Bridlewood. Based on her descriptions, Sunny and Pipp redecorate Izzy's section of the bedroom to evoke those pleasant memories, restoring her good cheer. Misty returns to the sleepover and secretly contacts Opaline to report on what she has learned, even though she has not found the lantern. Zipp wakes up and hears snippets of the conversation, heightening her suspicions.
8	7	"Hoof Done It?"	Will Lau	Janae Hall	September 26, 2022
Misty steals the lantern from the Brighthouse during the night, but has to bury it in the community garden in order to avoid being caught. The next day, Zipp begins searching for clues to its location and the thief. Pipp soon finds it, but decides to leave clues implicating her after she sees how much Zipp is enjoying her detective work. Zipp learns that Izzy borrowed the lantern to get tea leaves from the garden, then returned it to Sunny's nightstand. Misty flees after finding the lantern gone and being confronted by Zipp over her suspicious behavior. When Zipp corners her in Mane Melody and accuses her of the theft, Pipp returns the lantern and explains why she took it. She shows Zipp a song she has recorded about the search, and they stop Sunny from rallying all the ponies in Maretime Bay in an attempt to activate the lantern so it can be found. Angered by Misty's failure, Opaline decides to focus her efforts on Sparky instead.
9	8	"Have You Seen This Dragon?"	Randi Rodrigues	Kelly D'Angelo	September 26, 2022
Hitch finds Sparky missing and alerts his friends to help search for the dragon. Misty has kidnapped Sparky on Opaline's orders and is hiding with him in a closet of the Brighthouse. She tries to keep him under control, but he grows restless and rigs the closet with multiple booby traps to slow her down. Sunny and her friends split up to hunt for him in Maretime Bay, but they wind up interfering with each other's strategies until Pipp brings them together to sing a lullaby she wrote for him. Sparky's magically amplified responses lead the group back to the Brighthouse, where they find him unharmed. Misty avoids detection and returns to Opaline's castle with a wisp of Sparky's fire in a jar; it strengthens Opaline's magic, but she berates Misty for having failed to capture Sparky. Misty suffers an emotional breakdown due to Opaline's constant abuse toward her.

=== Chapter 3 (2022) ===
No. overall	No. in chapter	Title	Directed by	Written by	Original release date
10	1	Winter Wishday	Will Lau	Dave Horwitz	November 21, 2022
During the first winter since the restoration of magic, Sunny wants to celebrate Winter Wishday with her friends, but she finds out they all have different conflicting plans. Using the Marestream, a flying recreational vehicle created by the magic of Sunny's lantern, the group travels to visit Hitch's grandmother, then to Bridlewood so Izzy can participate in the unicorns' Wishiehoof Festival, and then to Zephyr Heights so Pipp and Zipp can perform in the city's Wishentine concert. The trip is marred by snowfall that worsens into a blizzard, which Zipp realizes is due to repetition of a unicorn holiday greeting that is actually an ancient spell meant to cause snow. Sunny and her friends return to Bridlewood so Izzy can teach the unicorns a spell to stop the blizzard, then reach the Crystal Brighthouse just in time to see the Wishing Star project their cutie marks into the night sky. Even though they have no gifts to exchange, Sunny is content to have had a chance to spend the holiday with her friends and share in their traditions.

=== Chapter 4 (2023) ===
No. overall	No. in chapter	Title	Directed by	Written by	Original release date
11	1	"Bridlewoodstock"	Will Lau	Gillian M. Berrow & Tony Fleecs	June 6, 2023
The glowing flora and crystal formations in a clearing within Bridlewood inspire Pipp to organize a music festival at the site. She and her friends line up three bands, separately promising that each will be the headlining act without informing one another. Izzy and the Bridlewood unicorns are uneasy about the idea, as they share a superstition about ghostly creatures called Troggles that can steal the voices of ponies who make noise at night. Sunny and her friends sort out the scheduling conflict and get the festival off to a strong start, but the Troggles attack and begin stealing voices. An old poem about them suggests that rubies can be used to drive them off, so Sunny manifests her alicorn powers to tear all the rubies off the stage decorations. The Troggles retreat and return everypony's voices, and Pipp apologizes to the crowd for dismissing their superstitions so easily. With the threat gone, though, the unicorns are ready to enjoy the festival, and all the bands team up with Pipp to continue the music.
12	2	"Top Remodel"	Randi Rodrigues	Leore Berris	June 6, 2023
Sunny and her friends visit the Canterlogic factory, which has stood empty and abandoned since the events of A New Generation. While Hitch and Pipp explore the building, Sunny and Izzy decide to turn it into a facility that all the ponies of Maretime Bay can enjoy, but receive a flood of conflicting suggestions when they ask for ideas. Hitch and Pipp discover that Sprout has been spying on them to make sure they do nothing suspicious inside the factory, which he claims to still own along with his mother. They also find a pack of winged rats, who left Zephyr Heights out of boredom, and persuade them to return home. Reminded by Izzy that it may not be possible to please everypony, Sunny sorts through the opinions she has received, and she and Izzy use the best ones to turn the building into a multimedia community center that they dub "Canterlove Studios." Meanwhile, Misty overhears Zipp analyzing Twilight Sparkle's message and reports to Opaline, who orders her to capture Sparky before Zipp can figure out Opaline's plan.
13	3	"The Jinxie Games"	Will Lau	Tony Fleecs	June 6, 2023
Hitch begins training for the Bridlewood Forest Critter Field Day, a contest in which pony/animal teams compete in various events, and chooses Queen Haven's dog Cloudpuff as his partner. When Haven postpones her monthly brunch with Pipp and Zipp, they suspect something may have happened to her. At the Field Day games, they discover that Haven has begun seeing Alphabittle. Hitch leaves Sparky in the sisters' care in order to concentrate on the competition, but they are so focused on Haven that they do not notice Sparky wandering away to climb a huge tree. Hitch saves him from falling; he and Pipp/Zipp apologize to each other for shirking their responsibilities, and Pipp and Zipp apologize to Haven for not understanding that she has her own life to live and enjoy. Meanwhile, Misty sneaks into the Crystal Brighthouse, intent on capturing Sparky, but finds a picture of herself enjoying time with Sunny and her friends. Once the group returns from Bridlewood, she has a chance to fulfill Opaline's order but chooses not to.
14	4	"Sunny Side Up"	Randi Rodrigues	Julia Prescott	June 6, 2023
To promote the newly opened Canterlove Studios, Sunny and her friends decide to broadcast a cooking show, starring Sunny and Hitch and directed by Pipp. Marred by Hitch's stage fright and Sunny's improvisation, the show degenerates into a food fight that garners widespread viewer approval. Pipp tries to build on this response by issuing outlandish challenges to the pair, but Sunny refuses, explaining to viewers what cooking means to her and urging them to act on their own judgment instead of conforming to others' ideas of what they should do. She and Hitch settle on a hosting style that makes them both comfortable, and the show draws so much interest that Canterlove Studios receives six months' worth of bookings. Meanwhile, Opaline punishes Misty for her failures by confining her to her room, then sets out in search of an artifact that can boost her power. Misty makes up her mind to escape, but Opaline returns before she can do so and notices a fake cutie mark that she has drawn on her flank as part of her plan.
15	5	"The Manesquerade Ball"	Will Lau	Jim Martin	June 6, 2023
Sunny and her friends are invited to attend the Manesquerade Ball, a high-profile dance party at the palace in Zephyr Heights. She wants to show off a dance she has choreographed that highlights cooperation between the three pony tribes, but has no time to rehearse it. The group brings Misty along when she sneaks out of Opaline's castle, but she is very nervous about attending. During the ball, Zipp searches the palace library for information on alicorn magic, and Misty slips in behind her and finds a book that Opaline can use. Misty admits to Zipp that she does not have a cutie mark, but Zipp reassures her that her friends will not turn her away because of this difference. Sunny and her friends improvise an energetic dance routine for the crowd; afterward, Misty thanks them for bringing her along and remaining friends with her. Zipp spots some pages torn out of the book Misty found, unaware that she has taken them with her and returned to Opaline's castle in order to prevent her absence from being discovered.
16	6	"A Little Horse"	Randi Rodrigues	Dave Horwitz	June 6, 2023
When Pipp catches a cold just before starting an important livestream, she is put on bed rest at the Crystal Brighthouse. Her friends try to look after her in ways that irritate her at first, but they eventually find things that genuinely make her more comfortable. Sunny travels to Zephyr Heights to bring back a special soup that Pipp ate as a filly when she got sick, Izzy brews a calming tea, Hitch plays board games with her, and Zipp shows off the research she has done in figuring out the culprit behind the plan to steal Equestrian magic. Pipp soon recovers and apologizes to her friends for being such a difficult patient, and the five set up to do the livestream from the Brighthouse. Meanwhile, after seeing Zipp's presentation during a visit with Pipp, Misty returns to Opaline's castle and warns her that Zipp is close to figuring out her entire plan.
17	7	"Missing the Mark"	Will Lau	Leore Berris	June 6, 2023
Misty captures Sparky and brings him to Opaline's castle, but upon learning that Opaline plans to drain his magic to restore her powers, she decides to rescue him instead. After she alerts Sunny and her friends and leads them to the castle, Opaline traps them and reveals that Misty has been serving her. The captives spurn Misty, disgusted at her betrayal, but she apologizes for treating them so poorly and frees them, earning her cutie mark in the process. The six successfully free Sparky and lure Opaline into a fight with Sunny, who summons her alicorn powers and gains a boost from the others' magic to overcome Opaline. The ponies take Sparky back to the Crystal Brighthouse to recover and welcome Misty into their group, promising to work together and find a way to defeat Opaline. Deducing that more dragons will soon awaken, Opaline makes a new plan to take their fire so she can further amplify her powers and steal all the magic in Equestria.

=== Chapter 5 (2023) ===
No. overall	No. in chapter	Title	Directed by	Written by	Original release date
18	1	"Cutie Blossom Bash"	Randi Rodrigues	Kelly D'Angelo	September 18, 2023
Sunny and her friends travel to Zephyr Heights so that Misty can take part in the city's annual Cutie Blossom Bash, which celebrates ponies who have recently earned their cutie marks. The other five recount for Misty how they earned their marks, but she begins to panic at the idea of telling her story to a crowd of strangers. After she finally tells the others that she does not want to participate in the Bash due to her shyness, they apologize for pressuring her into it and hold a private celebration in the palace gardens, planting a sapling and quickly growing it into a massive tree with their magic. Misty warns the others of Opaline's plan to collect dragon fire and steal Equestria's magic, and volunteers to act as a double agent for them. Over their objections, she hides her cutie mark with makeup and returns to Opaline's castle to begin her intelligence-gathering.
19	2	"Family Trees"	Randi Rodrigues	Laura Zak	September 18, 2023
20	3	"Family Trees"	Will Lau	Laura Zak	September 18, 2023
Part 1: After experiencing a series of strange dreams, Misty hurries to the Crystal Brighthouse to warn Sunny and her friends of a possible threat to them. The group travels to Bridlewood to search for clues and something that can heal Sparky after having his magic drained by Opaline. There, Misty's cutie mark magic inadvertently flares up and reveals the presence of Breezies, tiny flying pony-like creatures last seen in Equestria generations ago. She experiences more flashbacks and visions, remembering that she lived in Bridlewood as a filly before suddenly being transported away from it one day. The Breezies give her a key that matches a door she saw in her dreams, enchanted to take her to the place she most wants to go, but she vanishes after wandering away from the group. Meanwhile, Queen Haven tries to persuade Alphabittle to set up a second tea shop in Zephyr Heights, but he is reluctant to leave Bridlewood. The Breezies lead the couple to their market, where Alphabittle's cutie mark begins to glow as Misty's did. Part 2: As Sunny and her friends look for Misty in the Night Market, Sparky revives somewhat upon finding a fossilized dragon footprint. They decide that the key to his recovery is to reunite him with his own kind. Misty, having left the market to search for the door she saw in her dream, returns and shows them the key she was given. Encouraged by the fact that they now consider her to be part of their family, she leads them in a new search. Once Zipp finds the door, Misty uses her key to take them to Sparky's homeland rather than anyplace that can offer clues about her origins. Finding no other dragons there, they conclude that the entire race fled in order to escape from Opaline. Hitch decides to keep looking after Sparky until they can find other dragons to raise him. Upon returning to Bridlewood, Misty recognizes Alphabittle in a photo and remembers him as her father, having seen/heard him in her dream. As Alphabittle reveals to Haven that he stays in Bridlewood to watch for Misty's return after she went missing years earlier, the two are reunited. Alphabittle and Misty are eager to catch up on each other's lives, and Sparky returns to his old rambunctious self.
21	4	"Father of the Bridlewood"	Randi Rodrigues	Kelly D'Angelo	September 18, 2023
Thrilled to have Misty back in his life, Alphabittle arranges a day of activities that she enjoyed as a filly and shows off her old bedroom, which he has kept untouched since her disappearance. However, Misty has only faint memories of this portion of her life, and she finds that she does not like the things Alphabittle has planned. After she admits in an outburst that she barely even knows herself anymore, Alphabittle realizes that he cannot let his past memories control his entire life. The two reconcile and decide to start a new relationship, and Alphabittle arranges for Misty to move into the Crystal Brighthouse so she can build a life with her friends. Meanwhile, Sunny and Zipp take Elderflower, a Bridlewood storyteller, to Zephyr Heights in the hope of learning more about the history of Equestria. She tells them of Together Trees, created from the power of true friendship, that communicate and connect through their roots and help to protect ponies. Two such trees, she says, are the Wishing Tree in Bridlewood and the one in the palace gardens that was planted in Misty's honor.
22	5	"Mane Smelody"	Will Lau	Dave Horwitz	September 18, 2023
While hunting for flowers she can use in a new line of beauty products, Pipp finds an extremely malodorous plant that polishes her hooves to a high shine. She shares her discovery with Jazz Hooves, who is repulsed by the smell but agrees with Pipp's plan to sell hoof treatments that use the plant. Sales are brisk, but Jazz discovers that customers are coming in mainly as part of a viral video challenge to see how long they can stand the smell. She keeps silent at first but eventually reveals the truth to Pipp, who thanks her for her honesty, and Izzy brings in a different plant that neutralizes the odor without affecting the polish quality. Meanwhile, Sunny and Zipp find a faded map among Argyle Starshine's old possessions and try to find out more about it. A visit to the Breezies' market yields no help, but one vendor gives Sunny a ruby locket supposedly meant for her. Both the map and Sparky's scales gleam when he gets close to it. After Opaline tells Misty of her new plan to enslave the newly reawakened dragons and steal their power, Misty excuses herself and hurries to Maretime Bay to tell Sunny and the others.
23	6	"Nightmare on Mane Street"	Randi Rodrigues	Julia Prescott	September 18, 2023
Sunny and her friends begin preparing for Nightmare Night, setting the Crystal Brighthouse up as a haunted house and organizing a range of town-wide events. However, chaos at the first and apathy toward the second turn the celebration into a disaster. The ponies realize that they have been too worried about their own favorite aspects of the night to work together and have fun, and they resume the holiday with the understanding that it need not be perfect in order to be enjoyable. The next morning, Sparky sneezes fire over the map Sunny and Zipp found, fully restoring it so that it depicts an island that the ponies believe is the dragons' homeland. They resolve to travel back and warn the dragons of Opaline's plan. Meanwhile, Opaline discovers that the giant tree grown in Maretime Bay (see "Growing Pains") is a Together Tree, magically connected to the one sprouting through her castle. Sneaking into Maretime Bay via this link, she succeeds in stealing a pony's cutie mark and returns to her castle. She imprints the mark on a tree leaf and resolves to gather more once she has taken the dragons' power.

=== Chapter 6 (2023) ===
With the exception of the first part of "Roots of All Evil", which was directed by Randi Rodrigues, all episodes are directed by Will Lau.

No. overall	No. in chapter	Title	Written by	Original release date
24	1	"The Isle of Scaly"	Jim Martin	November 23, 2023
Sunny and her friends travel to the dragons' homeland in the Marestream, but are forced to crash-land when the Hope Lantern powering it begins to lose its magic. They encounter a group of dragons who are suspicious of their motives because Opaline has already abducted two of their kind, Lava and Jade. While Izzy, Pipp, and Misty stay behind to try and repair the Marestream, Sunny, Hitch, and Zipp are brought before the Dragon Lord -- who turns out to be Spike, Twilight Sparkle's assistant in the past. Though his memory has faded, he vouches for the ponies, tells them of Twilight's efforts to protect Equestria from Opaline, and marshals the other dragons to take them back to Equestria and help them find a way to stop Opaline from stealing its magic. Meanwhile, Opaline brainwashes Lava and Jade into serving her and harnesses their fire to steal the cutie marks from dozens of ponies.
25	2	"Roots of All Evil"	Gillian M. Berrow & Tony Fleecs	November 23, 2023
26	3	"Roots of All Evil"	Gillian M. Berrow & Tony Fleecs	November 23, 2023
Part 1: Opaline begins her attack on Equestria, using the Together Trees and her captured dragons to steal cutie marks everywhere. As Hitch mobilizes the Maretime Bay population, the other ponies watch over the Unity Crystals and the dragons take Sparky to face Opaline at her castle. The castle's Together Tree only began to connect to the others after Misty befriended the ponies, allowing Opaline to travel between them. After warning Hitch to keep ponies away from the Maretime Bay tree, Pipp and Zipp spread the word to Zephyr Heights while Izzy does the same in Bridlewood. Opaline brainwashes all the dragons except Sparky, traps him and Spike, and invades Maretime Bay. Hitch holds her off for a time, but she eventually overpowers him and takes his cutie mark, weakening the magic spell that protects the Crystal Brighthouse. Part 2: Opaline and the dragons attack the Brighthouse but cannot break through the protective spell. Misty draws her away, revealing that she is now friends with Sunny and the others, and Opaline turns her attention first to Zephyr Heights and then Bridlewood. Overcoming resistance at both locations, she steals the marks of Izzy, Pipp, Zipp, and Misty. Pipp realizes that the Together Trees gain their power through unity among ponies, and the group makes a new plan to have the ponies gather at their respective trees while Sunny faces Opaline alone. Opaline steals Sunny's mark after a protracted fight, breaking the spell on the Brighthouse, but does not notice that Sparky has managed to snap Spike out of her mind-control spell. As ponies all across Equestria rally in support of Sunny, Sparky drains Opaline's power and the magical Rainbow of Light in Sunny's locket traps her long enough for the castle's Together Tree to strip her mark and encase her within itself. Magic and cutie marks are restored, and the castle collapses as the tree springs fully to life. The dragons honor Sparky's wish to remain in Hitch's care and return to the Isle of Scaly, with Spike promising that they and the ponies will meet again.
27	4	"Secrets of Starlight"	Leore Berris	November 23, 2023
A portal in the Together Tree at Opaline's castle ruin transports Sunny and her friends to the wintry forest village of Starlight Ridge. There they meet the Auroricorns, crystal-horned unicorns whose magic creates beautiful light phenomena in the sky when they are happy. However, Sunny soon discovers that an evil winged leopard named Allura has taken control of Starlight Ridge and is hypnotizing the Auroricorns into pulling stars from the sky, in search of a magic one that can let her open portals to other realms. Discovering that the snow can be used to break the trance, the Equestrians free the Auroricorns by pelting them with snowballs and rally them to drive off Allura and her rabbit assistant, Twitch. Violet Frost, a mare who had led the counter-attack, becomes the new leader of Starlight Ridge. A relic stolen by Allura proves to contain the star she was seeking, and the Equestrians take it with them to return home, accompanied by Violet's inquisitive friend Comet. Due to Twitch's spying, Allura learns of the portal and the two use it to reach Equestria, intending to recover the star and get revenge on Sunny and her friends after a voice in Allura's head chastises her for failing to realize that she had it the entire time.

== Production ==
=== Development ===
In 2019, when My Little Pony: Friendship Is Magic concluded and "close[d] that chapter of Pony history", Hasbro began working on a fifth incarnation. To fit Generation Alpha's higher emotional intelligence, Entertainment One Vice President Emily Thompson stated more peer groups would be represented in the core cast. For example, the main character, Sunny Starscout, is "an activist working to make the pony world a better place." When development began, My Little Pony aimed to expand the namesake franchise's world rather than create a new one, unlike the previous incarnations. Like Friendship Is Magic, the series will be set in Equestria, the production team wanting to further explore the lore and worldbuilding established by the fourth incarnation. However, the fifth incarnation will be set many years after the events of the fourth, focusing on different ponies and unexplored parts of Equestria. For Hasbro, this gave them the opportunity to include easter eggs to the previous incarnations.

In February 2021, it was revealed that a computer-animated series had been green-lit for release on Netflix in 2022, as a follow-up to the film My Little Pony: A New Generation. Atomic Cartoons stated in May 2021 that it would be producing the My Little Pony series, and its parent company Thunderbird Entertainment disclosed later that year that 27 episodes were in the Atomic Cartoons production pipeline.

After the release of My Little Pony: A New Generation on September 24, 2021, the title My Little Pony: Make Your Mark, as well as the amount of content planned for 2022, was revealed by Entertainment One in a press release on February 17, 2022.

The new voices of the five main ponies were also revealed by the new voice actors on social media on February 17, 2022. In interviews, Maitreyi Ramakrishnan (the voice of Zipp Storm) stated that she had been immediately "on board" with the project upon knowing it was My Little Pony, having previously been a fan of animation such as Pixar films and My Little Pony: Friendship Is Magic.

== Release ==
A 44-minute special, titled Make Your Mark, premiered on May 26, 2022, as a teaser. Chapter 2 of the series, featuring eight 22-minute episodes, was released on Netflix on September 26. To promote the series, the online game My Little Pony: Visit Maretime Bay was released on Roblox on September 29, 2022, and a "Visit Maretime Bay" ad campaign was created in partnership with the travel site Tripadvisor.

Another double-length special episode, Winter Wishday, was released on Netflix on November 21, and served as the first season finale.

The second season consisting of the fourth chapter was released on June 6, 2023, with six 22-minute episodes and another 44-minute special Bridlewoodstock. A fifth chapter, which is the third season, and consisting of six episodes, was released on September 18, 2023.

A sixth and final chapter, consisting of three episodes and a 44-minute special, Secrets of Starlight, was released on November 23, 2023.
