= My Little Pony: A Maretime Bay Adventure =

2022 video game

- Developer(s): Melbot Studios
- Publisher(s): Outright Games
- Series: My Little Pony
- Platform(s): Nintendo Switch; PlayStation 4; Stadia; Windows; Xbox One; PlayStation 5; Xbox Series X/S
- Release: Nintendo Switch, PS4, Stadia, Windows, Xbox One; May 27, 2022; PS5, Xbox Series X/S; September 30, 2022
- Genre(s): Adventure
- Mode(s): Single-player, multiplayer

My Little Pony: A Maretime Bay Adventure is a 2022 video game that serves as a sequel to My Little Pony: A New Generation. Licensed by Hasbro and published by Outright Games, A Maretime Bay Adventure follows Sunny Starscout after the events of A New Generation as she tries to solve the mystery of recent criminal activity in Maretime Bay. The game was released for Nintendo Switch, PlayStation 4, Xbox One, Stadia, and Windows via Steam on May 27, 2022, with PlayStation 5 and Xbox Series X/S versions following on September 30, 2022.

A second video game, My Little Pony: A Zephyr Heights Mystery, was released in 2024.

== Plot ==
Following the events of My Little Pony: A New Generation, preparations are underway for the Maretime Bay Day festival. Sunny Starscout and her friends (Hitch Trailblazer, Izzy Moonbow, Zipp Storm, and Pipp Petals) are helping to prepare the festival. A wave of criminal activity hits Maretime Bay, however, with billboards of Sunny's friends being vandalized. Sprout Cloverleaf accuses Izzy, Zipp, and Pipp of being behind the vandalism and rallies the earth ponies of Maretime Bay against unicorns and pegasi. Sunny has to save the unity magic by convincing the earth ponies to back down and chases Sprout. After being defeated, Sprout is forgiven for his actions.
