= Maitreyi Ramakrishnan =

Canadian actress (born 2001)

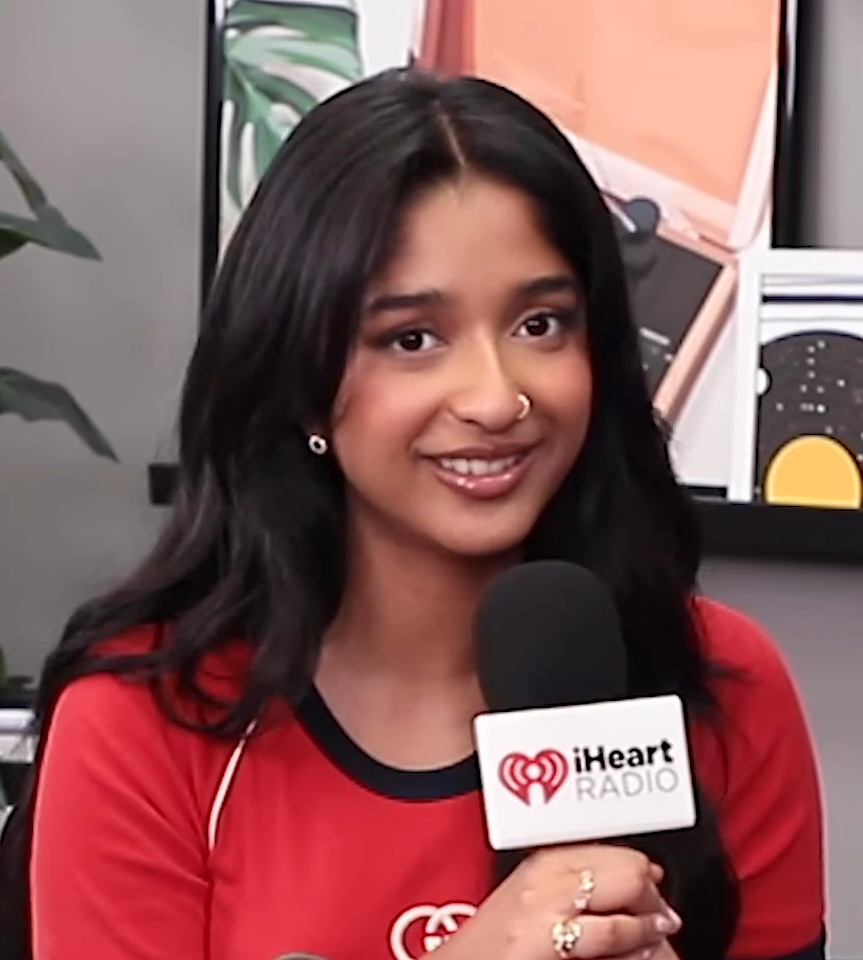
- Ramakrishnan in 2023
- Born: 28 December 2001 (age 24); Mississauga, Ontario, Canada
- Education: York University (BA)
- Occupation: Actress
- Years active: 2019–present

Maitreyi Ramakrishnan (/maɪˈtreɪi ˌrɑːməˈkrɪʃnən/ my-TRAY-ee RAH-mə-KRISH-nən; born 28 December 2001) is a Canadian actress. She rose to prominence for her leading role as high school student Devi Vishwakumar in the Netflix teen comedy series Never Have I Ever (2020–2023). She played voice roles in the animated films Turning Red (2022) and The Twits, and the animated series My Little Pony: Make Your Mark (2022–2023) and My Little Pony: Tell Your Tale (2022–2024). Ramakrishnan transitioned to live-action films with supporting roles in Slanted and Freakier Friday (both 2025).

== Early life ==
Maitreyi Ramakrishnan was born on 28 December 2001 in Mississauga, Ontario, where she was raised. She was born to Eelam Tamil parents who immigrated to Canada as refugees due to the country's civil war. She identifies herself as Tamil Canadian. She went to Lisgar Middle School for elementary and graduated from Meadowvale Secondary School.

Ramakrishnan decided to pursue an acting career in her last year at Meadowvale, and got the role in the Netflix teen comedy-drama series Never Have I Ever less than a year later. She deferred her acceptance to the theatre program at York University in Toronto, which she had initially planned to attend the fall after she graduated high school, so she could shoot the series in Los Angeles. In 2021, she deferred her acceptance a second time, while also switching her degree to human rights and equity studies. She explained the switch as a desire to "go into a programme for something that I truly just want to learn in my brain and not make a career out of." Ramakrishnan ultimately graduated from York in the autumn of 2025.

== Career ==
=== 2019–2021: Breakthrough with Never Have I Ever ===
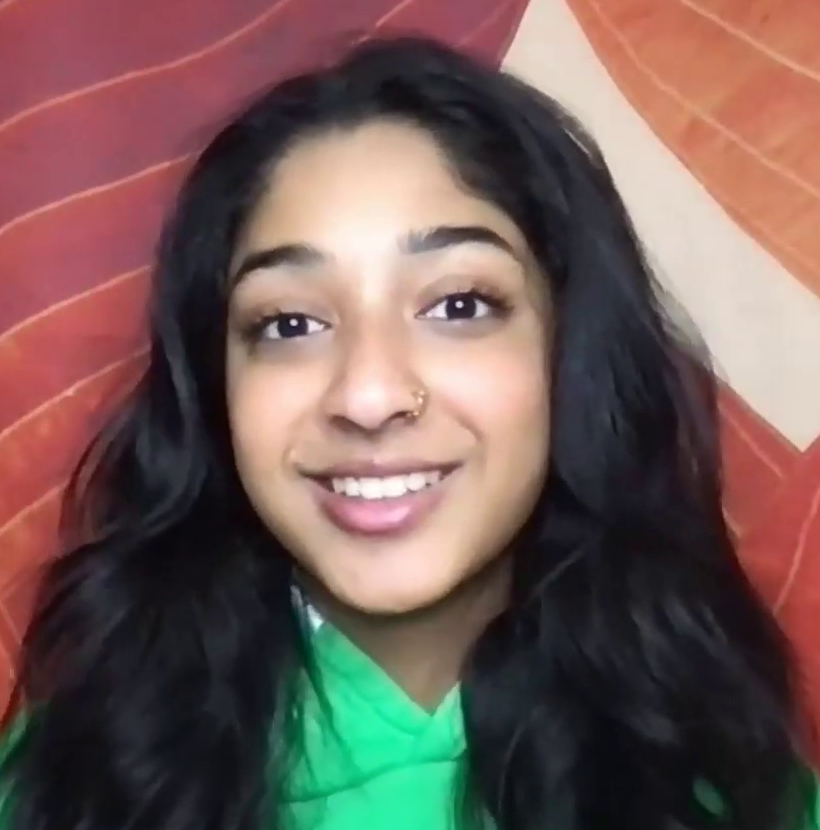
Ramakrishnan in 2021

Ramakrishnan made her professional acting debut as Devi Vishwakumar, the protagonist, in the Netflix teen comedy-drama series Never Have I Ever. In 2019, she was chosen by Mindy Kaling out of 15,000 candidates who had applied for an open casting call for the show. Ramakrishnan created her audition tape at a local library, using her mother's camera, eventually being asked to send four more videos, before having a screen test in Los Angeles and being offered the role. Ramakrishnan was 17 at the time of her casting and had not acted professionally. Her casting received significant media attention, especially in Canada, due to the nature of the open casting call and for her Tamil Canadian identity. That year, Today named her one of eighteen "Groundbreakers" on the International Day of The Girl, a list of girls who were breaking down barriers and "changing the world".

In April 2020, Never Have I Ever premiered on Netflix. Ramakrishnan's character, Devi Vishwakumar, an Indian-American Tamil high school student, is loosely based on Mindy Kaling. The program ran for four seasons until June 2023. The series and Ramakrishnan's performance received generally positive reviews, with Variety calling it a "breakout performance". She received nominations for an Independent Spirit Award, a Canadian Screen Award, an MTV Movie & TV Award, and two People's Choice Awards. In July 2020, Netflix reported the series had been viewed by 40 million households globally since its release.

In May, Ramakrishnan participated in the live-read series Acting for a Cause, appearing as Olivia for a live staged reading of William Shakespeare's play Twelfth Night, to help raise money for a local hospital in Chicago, which was struggling to combat the COVID-19 pandemic. Later that month, she hosted the livestream segment of the Children's and Youth Programming Category for the 8th Canadian Screen Awards. In February 2021, Ramakrishnan was named as Breakout Actor in Time's Time100 Next list of the next hundred influential people.

=== 2022–present: Transition to film and voice roles ===
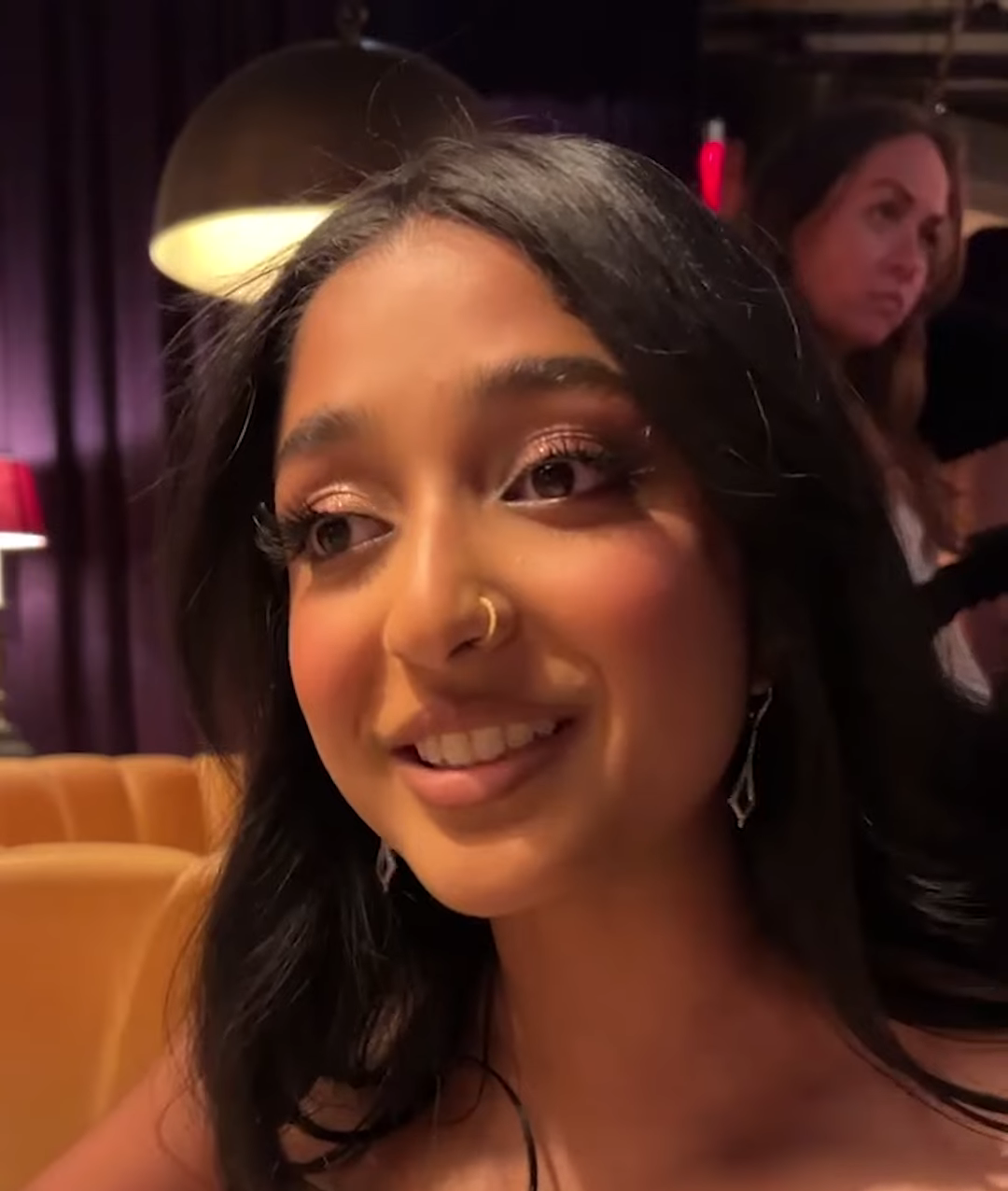
Ramakrishnan in 2023

Ramakrishnan voiced Priya Mangal, an Indian-Canadian mellow, deadpan girl who is one of the protagonist's friends, in the Pixar animated fantasy comedy film Turning Red. The film was released on 11 March 2022 to Disney+ and limited theaters. Ramakrishnan voiced Zipp Storm throughout the content slate for the fifth incarnation of the My Little Pony franchise. The first project, the 2D animated short-form web series, My Little Pony: Tell Your Tale, premiered via YouTube in early April. The series was renewed up to 2026, but prematurely concluded in October 2024, with a two-season run. Ramakrishnan also voiced the character for the animated Netflix series, My Little Pony: Make Your Mark, which premiered in September and was preceded by a special of the same name in May. The series ran for six "chapters" until November 2023. Also in April 2022, Ramakrishnan received the honorary Radius Award from the Academy of Canadian Cinema & Television at the 10th Canadian Screen Awards, for her global impact on television. In November, she appeared in a Netflix holiday special tied to the Make Your Mark series, titled My Little Pony: Winter Wishday. It was followed by the third and fourth specials, My Little Pony: Bridlewoodstock and Secrets of Starlight, in June and November 2023. In October 2023, Ramakrishnan had a guest voice role on the adult animated sitcom Big Mouth as Marissa, the new love interest and neighbour of the young fictional version of series co-creator Andrew Goldberg.

Ramakrishnan made her live-action film debut with a supporting role in the comedy drama Slanted, which premiered on 8 March 2025, at the 2025 South by Southwest Film & TV Festival. The film was met with positive reception and won the jury award for narrative feature at the festival; it received a limited theatrical release in March 2026. Ramakrishnan played Brindha, the confident best friend of the protagonist, who undergoes an ethnic modification surgery. IndieWire described her performance as a "scene-stealing turn" while Screen Daily called it "amusing"; Jenny Nulf of The Austin Chronicle wrote that "every time [she] is in a scene, it stands out". Some critics found her to be "not enough in the film", calling her "underused". She had another voice role as the female lead Nan-young—an astronaut—opposite Justin H. Min in the English dub of Netflix's Korean animated sci-fi romance film Lost in Starlight, released on 30 May. Ramakrishnan next appeared in a supporting part, as pop star Ella, in Disney's Freakier Friday, led by Jamie Lee Curtis and Lindsay Lohan, the sequel to Freaky Friday (2003). Theatrically released on 8 August 2025, it received positive reviews and grossed $153 million worldwide. Her final film release of 2025 was the animated musical fantasy The Twits, loosely based on Roald Dahl's 1980 children's novel. Ramakrishnan voiced Beesha Balti, a 12-year-old orphan girl, in this Netflix production; the film received a mixed response from critics. She was nominated for Best Voice Acting in a Feature Production at the 53rd Annie Awards. In April 2026, Ramakrishnan appeared in a guest role as Countess Crow—part of the teenage superhero group Teenage Kix—in the fifth season of The Boys.

Ramakrishnan and Priyanka Kedia co-led the dance comedy Best of the Best, directed by Lena Khan, which released on 18 September 2026 on Netflix. She is now set to appear as part of an ensemble voice cast in The Angry Birds Movie 3, which will be theatrically released in December 2026. In February 2026, Ramakrishnan was cast in a recurring role for the second season of Prime Video's Elle, the prequel series to Legally Blonde. She has committed to star in the romantic comedy film The Netherfield Girls, Netflix's contemporary adaptation of Jane Austen's novel Pride and Prejudice.

== Other activities ==
=== Brand associations ===
In March 2022, Ramakrishnan fronted the spring campaign, "Members Always: Future Together", for clothing retailer American Eagle, alongside Madelyn Cline, Joshua Bassett, Michael Evans Behling, Coco Gauff, and Mxmtoon. In June 2023, she and her brother Vishwaa starred in Tim Hortons' commercial for its Dream Cookies offering. In April 2024, Ramakrishnan was announced as Lancôme's brand ambassador in Canada. In October and November 2024, she appeared in four commercials for the Nintendo Switch, promoting the video games Super Mario Party Jamboree, Mario Kart 8 Deluxe, and Super Smash Bros. Ultimate. In January 2026, Ramakrishnan became the face of haircare brand Fable & Mane's 2026 global campaign titled, "Where All Rituals Begin: From Ancient Lands to Modern Hands". The following month, she appeared in a Super Bowl LX TV commercial celebrating the 30th anniversary of the Pokémon franchise, alongside Lady Gaga, Trevor Noah, Charles Leclerc, Jisoo, and Young Miko, revealing her favourite Pokémon to be Luxray. The commercial also aired during the 2026 Winter Olympics.

=== Philanthropy ===
Since October 2020, Ramakrishnan has served as a global ambassador for humanitarian organization Plan International Canada, promoting girls and women's rights and gender equality. As part of this role, she has hosted several gaming livestreams on her Twitch channel and conducted fundraisers to support women's rights. Ramakrishnan starred in the 2021 campaign for clothing brand Nobis's #NoColdShoulder initiative, which focuses on collecting and donating used jackets every November.

== Views ==
In 2022, Ramakrishnan stated that she does not care about labels or the gender of the person that she dates or is in a relationship with, describing herself as "very much so a personality person": "I don't care if you're a boy, girl, or in between".

In 2026, Ramakrishnan revealed that she identifies her ethnic background as Eelam Tamil rather than Sri Lankan Tamil, citing the impact the Sri Lankan civil war had on her growing up. Canadian Tamil journalist Radheyan Simonpillai, writing for Time, noted that for her family, "calling themselves Sri Lankan would be akin to a Palestinian calling themselves Israeli." Ramakrishnan's comments triggered a review bomb campaign against her Netflix film Best of the Best, instigated by Sri Lankan Sinhalese nationalist pages online. Thousands of negative reviews for the film on IMDb came from Sri Lanka.

== Filmography ==
Key
†	Denotes films that have not yet been released

=== Film ===
Year	Title	Role	Notes	Ref.
2022	Turning Red	Priya Mangal (voice)		
2025	Slanted	Brindha		
2025	Lost in Starlight	Joo Nan-Young (voice)	English dub	
2025	Freakier Friday	Ella		
2025	The Twits	Beesha (voice)		
2026	Best of the Best	Maya Krishnaraj		
2026	The Angry Birds Movie 3 †	TBA	Post-production	

=== Television ===
Year	Title	Role	Notes	Ref.
2020–2023	Never Have I Ever	Devi Vishwakumar	Main role	
2022–2024	My Little Pony: Tell Your Tale	Zipp Storm (voice)	Main role	
2022	My Little Pony: Make Your Mark (special)	Zipp Storm (voice)	Television special	
2022–2023	My Little Pony: Make Your Mark	Zipp Storm (voice)	Main role	
2022	My Little Pony: Winter Wishday	Zipp Storm (voice)	Television special	
2023	My Little Pony: Bridlewoodstock	Zipp Storm (voice)	Television special	
2023	Big Mouth	Marissa (voice)	Episode: "Get the F**k Outta My House"	
2023	My Little Pony: Secrets of Starlight	Zipp Storm (voice)	Television special	
2026	The Boys	Countess Crow	Episode: "Teenage Kix"	
TBA	Elle †	Sam	Recurring role (season 2)	

== Awards and nominations ==
Year	Award	Category	Work	Result	Ref.
2021	Independent Spirit Award	Best Female Performance in a New Scripted Series	Never Have I Ever	Nominated	
2021	Canadian Screen Awards	Cogeco Fund Audience Choice Award	Never Have I Ever	Nominated	
2021	MTV Movie & TV Awards	Best Kiss (with Jaren Lewison)	Never Have I Ever	Nominated	
2021	Unforgettable Awards Gala	Breakout in TV	Herself	Honored	
2022	Canadian Screen Awards	Radius Award	Herself	Honored	
2022	People's Choice Awards	The Female TV Star of 2022	Never Have I Ever	Nominated	
2022	People's Choice Awards	The Comedy TV Star of 2022	Never Have I Ever	Nominated	
2026	Annie Awards	Outstanding Achievement for Voice Acting in an Animated Feature Production	The Twits	Nominated	

== See also ==
- South Asian Canadians in the Greater Toronto Area
- List of Tamil people
