= My Little Pony Tales =

- DVD Cover
- Genre: Slice of life
- Based on: My Little Pony by Bonnie Zacherle
- Directed by: Seung-Jin Oh; Kyung-Chook Sah; Young-Wook Yeo; Nak-Jong Kim; Young-Soo Lee; Heung-Sun Oh
- Creative director: Jay Bacal
- Voices of: Brigitta Dau; Laura Harris; Willow Johnson; Lalainia Lindbjerg; Maggie Blue O'Hara; Kelly Sheridan; Venus Terzo; Chiara Zanni
- Theme music composer: Barry Harman; Tommy Goodman
- Opening theme: "My Little Pony Tales"
- Composers: Barry Harman; Tommy Goodman
- Country of origin: United States
- Original language: English
- No. of seasons: 1
- No. of episodes: 26

Production
- Executive producers: Carole Weitzman; Joe Bacal; Tom Griffin; C.J. Kettler
- Producers: Terry Lennon; Roger Slifer
- Running time: 10 minutes
- Production company: Sunbow Productions

Original release
- Network: The Disney Channel
- Release: August 2 – December 25, 1992

Related
- My Little Pony (TV series); My Little Pony: Friendship Is Magic; My Little Pony: Pony Life; My Little Pony: Make Your Mark

My Little Pony Tales is an American animated television series produced by Sunbow Productions and distributed by Graz Entertainment, with animation being produced by AKOM. The series, based on the My Little Pony toys by Hasbro, weekly aired for 26 episodes from August 2 to December 25, 1992 on The Disney Channel. The series was syndicated from 1993 to 1995. As of 2022, My Little Pony Tales has been released on DVD in Australia, Europe, and the United States.

== Plot ==
The series followed seven young female ponies who live in Ponyland, a society of anthropomorphic ponies. They are: Starlight, Sweetheart, Melody, Bright Eyes, Patch, Clover, and Bon Bon. They live like humans as they attend school, frequent the local ice cream shop, enter talent contests, and even roller skate. Some of the girl ponies begin to show a romantic interest in the male ponies, Teddy, Ace, and Lancer; they even go on dates with them. In contrast to the previous series which focused on ponies and humans, the new series centered only on the ponies. Each episode featured at least one song performed by the ponies.

== Characters ==
Like the toys the show was based on, each of the ponies has a distinct flank symbol.

=== Main ===
The seven preteen female ponies are sometimes referred to as the 7 Pony Friends.

Starlight
Voiced by: Willow Johnson
Starlight, a pink pony with golden-yellow hair, is the sensible and responsible leader of the group. She regards school teacher Miss Hackney highly and aspires to become a teacher herself. Her mother owns the Rainbow Beauty Salon and an ice cream shop where Starlight works. Starlight has a one-sided crush on Ace. Her flank symbol is a yellow star that is surrounded by four blue stars.

Sweetheart
Voiced by: Maggie Blue O'Hara
Sweetheart, a white pony with dark pink hair, dislikes letting anyone down, however, she occasionally finds herself in the middle of fights between her friends. She tends to see the good in ponies, including ones that seem bad like Teddy, whom she likes. Her friends don't like Teddy and this causes friction between them. She has a younger sister named Sugar. She wants to be a doctor when she grows up. Her flank symbol is a big red heart that is surrounded by three little orange hearts.

Melody
Voiced by: Kelly Sheridan
Melody, a dark pink pony with dark sea-blue hair, is the lead singer in the band The Rockin' Beats. She has a somewhat shallow personality and likes to gossip. She occasionally acts spoiled and puts her own interests ahead of those of her friends. She sometimes offers beauty advice to the others, and aspires to become a famous rock star. Her mother is a nurse who works at a hospital. She has younger twin sisters named Jing-A-Ling and Ting-A-Ling. Her flank symbol is a yellow microphone that is surrounded by several music notes.

Bright Eyes
Voiced by: Laura Harris
Bright Eyes, a bluish pony with orange red hair, loves to learn things. She tends to think things out logically whenever there is a problem. She wants to be an environmentalist when she grows up. She is infatuated with Lancer. Her father works for the newspaper. Her flank symbol is a notebook and pen.

Patch
Voiced by: Venus Terzo (episodes 1–16), Brigitta Dau (episodes 17–26)
Patch, a peach pony with dark pink hair, who is a member of the soccer team. She acts like an adventurous tomboy and is constantly looking for something to do. She enjoys practical jokes. She wants to join the circus when she grows up. She is the only character in the series to witness magical or supernatural phenomena. Her flank symbol is a patch of pink cloth.

Clover
Voiced by: Lalainia Lindbjerg
Clover, a lavender purple pony with rose-pink hair, tends to be accident prone. She frequently bursts into tears because of her ineptitude, but things generally work out for her in the end because of either luck or because her friends help out. She is very superstitious and gullible. She wants to become a ballerina like her big sister Meadowlark when she grows up. Her flank symbol is a clover leaf.

Bon Bon
Voiced by: Chiara Zanni
Bon Bon, a yellow pony with burgundy purple hair, enjoys food and cooking. She hates getting dirty. She wants to become a fashion model when she grows up. She keeps a diary. She comes from a large family, with an two older siblings named Misty and Rusty and three younger siblings named Amber, Twink and an unnamed baby brother. (Note: In the UK 1994 My Little Pony annual, Bon Bon is also said to have a sixth unnamed older sister.) At one point she had a crush on Ace. Her flank symbol is a piece of blue candy.

=== Supporting ===
Teddy
Voiced by: Tony Sampson
Teddy is a blue male pony with an orange mohawk who wears sunglasses. He is an impulsive show off who tends to irritate others. Despite his bold personality, it is later revealed that he sleeps with a teddy bear, which he keeps hidden from nearly everyone. He becomes a love interest for Sweetheart, while he has a crush on Bon Bon. His flank symbol is a comb.

Ace
Voiced by: Brad Swaile
Ace, a gold male pony with light blond hair, is an athletic and confident jock at the school. Many of the female ponies admire him and consider him a dream date. He is Teddy's best friend, and teams up with him in influencing Lancer. He enjoys soccer and many other activities. He has a crush on Melody, but this is largely unrequited, while Starlight has a crush on him. Bright Eyes thinks "Ace likes Ace better than anyone". His flank symbol is a soccer ball.

Lancer
Voiced by: Shane Meier
Lancer, a dark blue male pony with crimson red hair, is quiet and gentle. He is shy and fond of books. His parents are wealthy and are sometimes away on trips. He has feelings for Bright Eyes, and often sides with the girl ponies in order to impress her. He is talented at roller skating. He wants to be an explorer when he grows up. His flank symbol is a fleur-de-lis.

Miss Hackney
Voiced by: Kate Robbins
Miss Hackney is a periwinkle pony with lavender hair. She teaches the girl and boy ponies at the school. She shows a high degree of patience, especially with Patch, who has behavior issues. She is strict, but fair. Starlight considers her a role model. It is hinted that she may have feelings for Mr. Kiddoo, who pilots a hot air balloon. Her flank symbol is a small chalkboard.

Others

== Broadcast ==
My Little Pony Tales began airing on The Disney Channel on Sunday mornings starting on August 2, 1992, and on weekday mornings starting on September 1, 1992. Reruns of the show continued on The Disney Channel until 1996. In the half-hour block, the first part featured an episode from the old 1980s series My Little Pony 'n Friends and the second part was an episode made for the new My Little Pony Tales series. The production codes when My Little Pony Tales and its songs were submitted to the US Copyright Office in 1993, were numbered from 200-01 to 200-13.

=== Broadcast UK history ===
- Sky One (1993–1995)

== Voices ==
- Brigitta Dau – Patch (episodes 17–26)
- Laura Harris – Bright Eyes, Tuneful
- Willow Johnson – Starlight, Pretty Beat, Moonbeam, China Shop Owner
- Lalainia Lindbjerg – Clover, Sweet Notes, Blue Wedding Guest, Red Journalist
- Shane Meier – Lancer
- Maggie Blue O'Hara – Sweetheart
- Kate Robbins – Miss Hackney
- Tony Sampson – Teddy, Ace (episode 7), Blue Masquerade Pony
- Kelly Sheridan – Melody, Championship Organizer
- Brad Swaile – Ace
- Venus Terzo – Patch (episodes 1–16)
- Chiara Zanni – Bon Bon, Logan
- Richard Ian Cox – Mr. Tidwell, Mr. Barrington, Yorkie, Mr. Meadowsweet, Mr. Kiddoo, Cheval, Spot, Sweetheart's father, Bon Bon's father, Clover's father, Patch's father, Postman, Cameraman, Dustman, Fisherman, Rollerskate Contest Judge, Fairground Stall Holder, Competition Organizer, King of the Isle of Pony, Usher, Wedding Guest #1, Wedding Guest #2, Wedding Guest #3, Vicar, Cake Shop Owner, Mayor, Yellow Journalist, Doctor, Coach, Referee

== Crew ==
- Wally Burr – Voice Director, Songs Producer
- Doug Parker – Casting Advisor
- Cathy Weseluck – Singers' Director

== Episodes ==
No.	Title	Written by	Original release date
1	"Slumber Party"	George Arthur Bloom	July 3, 1992
The girl ponies spend a night at Sweetheart's home. Patch shares a bedtime story about a medieval would-be knight named Squire, who tried to tame the dragon Basil but failed. They hear a noise in the attic, but when they investigate, all they find is Sweetheart's cat, Springfield. Later, as Patch goes to sleep, she sees Squire's ghost, who requests her help in finding Basil. Song featured: "Things Are Not Always What They Seem", sung by Patch.
2	"Too Sick to Notice"	Kayte Kuch & Sheryl Scarborough	July 10, 1992
Bon Bon's youngest baby brother is sick; she feels ignored as her family cares for him. Bon Bon pretends to be sick to garner attention, but in the process, it puts her family in disarray. She confesses that she wasn't really sick, but then the flu spreads to her entire family. Song featured:: "A Little Attention", sung by Bon Bon.
3	"Battle of the Bands"	George Arthur Bloom	July 17, 1992
Melody and her band The Rockin' Beats prepare for "The Battle of the Bands" competition. Melody is asked to look after her younger twin sisters Jing-a-Ling and Ting-a-Ling. Unable to find another babysitter, she takes them with her to the competition. She does her best to keep the twins out of trouble but the twins appear on stage. The Rockin' Beats wins the competition. Song featured: "Sweet Music", first sung by The Rockin' Beats, then sung by Jing-A-Ling and Ting-A-Ling.
4	"And the Winner Is..."	George Arthur Bloom	July 24, 1992
After having a dream that she won the Ponyland lottery, Clover wakes up and discovers she is the winner of two concert ball tickets. She must choose someone to take, however, in an attempt to please everyone, she invites each of her friends separately. They discover this gaffe, and chase after Clover. Mr. Bloom selects a random name, and picks Melody. Clover remorses about going while the others watch them on TV; she and Melody sell the tickets, and buy pizza so they can join their friends at home. Song featured: "The Choice", sung by Clover.
5	"Stand by Me"	Kayte Kuch & Sheryl Scarborough	July 31, 1992
Melody brings her new cassette player to school, but accidentally leaves it behind in the school yard. After the cassette player goes missing, Melody and her friends strongly suspect Teddy stole it. The following day, a mock trial is held in the school classroom, with Teddy as the defendant and Bright Eyes as the prosecutor. Despite Teddy's wishes, Sweetheart becomes his defense attorney, which makes Melody believe that Sweetheart has betrayed their gang. During the trial, the witnesses and the class cannot provide evidence that Teddy took the cassette player. Sweetheart eventually summons the school's custodian, who reveals that he picked up the cassette player and brought it to the Lost & Found. Sweetheart gets her cassette player back and Melody's attitude changes. Song featured: "You Don't Know the Boy", sung by Sweetheart.
6	"The Tea Party"	George Arthur Bloom	August 7, 1992
The girl ponies are holding a tea party at an abandoned house. Starlight coaxes her friends to invite boys into their club. After they leave, a family of new ponies arrives and collects furniture from the house. When Starlight and friends return, they find their club items missing, and set traps. The family gets caught in them, but the girl ponies find out they are not thieves but the Barrington family, who have recently moved in. The girl ponies make up for their mistake by helping the Barringtons furnish the house. Later, Mr. Barrington presents a club house to the girl ponies. Starlight invites Logan Barrington for cookies at the next tea party. Song featured: "Boys! Boys! Boys!", sung by the 7 Pony Friends.
7	"The Masquerade"	Marv Wolfman & Noel Wolfman	August 14, 1992
As a reward for passing exams, Miss Hackney arranges a costume party for the class, where they dress up as their career aspiration. Bon Bon wants to dress up as a model but thinks she'll be a laughing stock. At the party, when she is about to enter, she hears laughing and runs away to the forest. The ponies were actually laughing at Patch's clown act. Teddy, the only pony to catch sight of Bon Bon, notifies the others and the ponies go after her. They find her and convince her to come back to the party. Bon Bon almost falls off a ledge, but they rescue her and return to the party. Song featured: "The Best Dream", sung by Bon Bon.
8	"Out of Luck"	George Arthur Bloom	August 21, 1992
While searching a junkyard for pieces for his artwork, Clover's father finds a white teapot. Clover keeps the teapot, but soon begins to experience bad luck. Suspecting the teapot is the cause, Clover tries to get rid of it, but it somehow returns to her and gets her in further trouble. She eventually returns it to her father, who adds it to his art sculpture. Song featured: "When Fortune Smiled on Me", sung by Clover.
9	"The Play's the Thing"	Donna Harman	August 28, 1992
The class participates in a play by Shakespony. Melody is selected for a leading princess role. She starts to boss around her family and friends. Upset by her attitude, the girl ponies spoil Melody's rehearsal in front of Teddy and Ace. After Starlight snaps at Melody about her current nature, Melody sees how selfish she was, and makes up. Afterwards, the performance runs smoothly. Song featured: "The Magic of Theater", sung by Starlight.
10	"Shop Talk"	Douglas Allen Booth	September 4, 1992
Melody and Starlight share gossip with their friends, except for Sweetheart, who does not like telling on others. Patch imagines that Teddy has a secret; she tells her friends that Teddy has a teddy bear. Ace overhears this and tells Lancer at football practice. They both poke fun at Teddy until he gives them a punch up and heads home. Teddy, who really owns a teddy bear, is mad at Sweetheart, who worsens his mood. Sweetheart hatches a plan to clear this up. Bright Eyes and Melody bring Ace and Lancer to babysit Sweetheart's baby sisters. When feeding time comes, the girl ponies have Ace and Lancer eat and dress like babies. Sweetheart takes a picture of them, which would ruin their reputation. Ace and Lancer agree to drop the teddy bear story in exchange for the picture. Teddy is relieved that his secret is safe. Song featured: "A Juicy Story", sung by the 7 Pony Friends.
11	"The Impractical Joker"	Buzz Dixon	September 11, 1992
Melody, Starlight and Sweetheart are invited to a date by rock star Chain Link, but it turns out it was a prank phone call from Patch. For her next joke, Patch has Bon Bon do a cooking documentary, but her nervousness causes her to burn a cake. Patch also sabotages Bright Eyes's class project by playing footage of Bon Bon's failed cooking attempt. The girl ponies try to get revenge on Patch but their amateur prank does not work on her. Patch then sees a flying saucer and finds aliens where it lands. When the aliens declare that they want to remove her brain, Patch panics and backs away until she falls into a tub of water. The girl ponies and Teddy emerge and reveal the practical joke. Song featured: "Practical Jokes", sung by Patch.
12	"The Great Lemonade Stand Wars"	George Arthur Bloom	September 18, 1992
While teasing Bon Bon about her diary, the girl ponies accidentally break their only tea set. Lacking funds for a new one, they open a lemonade stand. The boys are envious of the girls' business so they plan to open one of their own. Ace worms the recipe out of Bon Bon, and the rivalry between the boys and girls escalates, until Lancer makes amends with the girls. Song featured: "Think Again", sung by the girl and boy ponies.
13	"Blue Ribbon Blues"	George Arthur Bloom	September 25, 1992
In order to show Sweetheart his good nature, Teddy invites her to his cousin's farm. Teddy has trouble with the hens and a pig named Yorkie, who tears his teddy bear. To not have to admit that he owns a teddy bear, he pretends that it was a gift for his niece Daisy. Teddy gets mad and scares Yorkie off of the farm. His cousin Corny finds Yorkie, but falls into a river. Teddy, who has never swum in running water before, musters his courage and rescues Corny. At a country fair, Yorkie wins a first prize ribbon and Teddy wins a stuffed pig. He swaps the pig with Daisy for his teddy bear and feels happy. Song featured: "It's Harvest Time", sung by the Meadowsweet family.
14	"Roll Around the Clock"	Kayte Kuch & Sheryl Scarborough	October 2, 1992
For the upcoming roller derby, Lancer and Bright Eyes want to be partners, but are too shy to ask each other. Their friends try to help; Ace and Teddy encourage Lancer to act like a bad boy, while the girl ponies suggest that Bright Eyes act like an air-headed glamor girl. Lancer and Bright Eyes end up accidentally insulting each other, and walk off. On the day of the roller derby, the two explain what happened and make up. They then enter the derby together and win first place. Song featured: "Play It Cool", sung by the girl and boy ponies.
15	"Princess Problems"	Kayte Kuch & Sheryl Scarborough	October 9, 1992
Patch and her friends help out at the orphanage she once lived in. The King and Queen are expected to arrive in search of their long lost daughter, whose description seems to match Patch's, after she notices a birth mark on her hoof. The girls dress Patch up as a princess, but Patch feels very gloomy about leaving her adoptive parents and friends. The King and Queen do not find their daughter, and Patch discovers that the birthmark on her hoof is actually a fleck of paint. When they are about to leave, Clover realizes that an orphan named Rosy is the missing daughter, so the girls brings Rosy to her parents. Song featured: "A Princess Must Look Beautiful", sung by the 7 Pony Friends.
16	"An Apple for Starlight"	Richard Merwin	October 16, 1992
Miss Hackney feels dizzy and leaves the teaching to Starlight, who has to explain about the prehistoric cave ponies of Pinto Cave and how a pulley works. The class does not pay attention. Starlight takes them on a field trip to Pinto Cave. They end up stuck in a cavern where settler ponies left behind their tools. To get out of the cave, Ace and Starlight attach a pulley to the cave ceiling and hoist the ponies up. They return to school where Miss Hackney expresses her gratitude by giving Starlight an apple. Song featured: "Lessons", sung by Starlight, Bright Eyes and Sweetheart.
17	"Up, Up and Away"	Donna Harman	October 23, 1992
A UFO is sighted in the mountains. The police will not allow anyone to get close. Mr. Kiddoo plans to show the class his hot air balloon. Patch and a reluctant Bon Bon sneak on board the balloon and it is launched. They are attacked by birds that tear the balloon and almost fall into shark infested waters. The UFO turns out to be Glow 'n Show ponies, magical flying ponies that glow. One of the flying ponies, Dazzleglow, a pony with a pair of wings and a horn, (Note: Although the term "alicorn" for a horse with a pair of wings and a horn has become commonplace among My Little Pony viewers during the 2010s, the use of the term in the context of this series is incorrect, as it was never used in any My Little Pony products or promotional materials of the era.) repairs the balloon, and the flying ponies bring Patch and Bon Bon to safety. Song featured: "The Adventure", sung by Patch.
18	"Sister of the Bride"	Kayte Kuch & Sheryl Scarborough	October 30, 1992
Clover's sister, Meadowlark, is going to marry the handsome pony Cheval. Clover and her friends help prepare for the wedding, but Clover makes some blunders in the process. The girls notice that Cheval is flattering another female pony, and suspect him of two-timing Meadowlark. In their attempts to call Cheval out on this, they ruin the wedding cake and flowers. The female pony turns out to be Cheval's sister. Clover manages to find flowers in her family's garden. Bon Bon fixes the wedding cake, and the rings are found in time for the ceremony. Song featured: "Today's My Wedding Day", sung by Meadowlark.
19	"Birds of a Feather"	Richard Merwin	November 6, 1992
Bright Eyes reads about an endangered green-winged song bird. Bright Eyes, Ace, Bon Bon and Patch explore the forest to find out why the bird is endangered. After braving the forest, they become lost and hungry. They eventually spot the green-winged song bird, and learn that the birds have become endangered because their habitat is being logged. Bon Bon uses the directions she wrote in her diary to return safely to town. Bright Eyes shares her findings, and the mayor declares her Pony of the Month. Song featured: "In the Forest", sung by Bright Eyes.
20	"Send in the Clown"	George Arthur Bloom	November 13, 1992
Clover's sister, Meadowlark, visits. Clover feels overshadowed by Meadowlark and her talent at ballet. When the Harlequin in the upcoming recital of The Nutcracker is injured, Clover takes her place, but is so overcome with nervousness, that she pretends to have amnesia. Sensing her sister's stage fright, Meadowlark confesses to Clover that she felt the same way at her first performance. On the night of the recital, Clover performs her part brilliantly and receives applause from the crowd and her family. Song featured: "She's So Much Better Than Me", sung by Clover.
21	"Happy Birthday, Sweetheart"	George Arthur Bloom	November 20, 1992
The girls practice their swimming routine at Lancer's mansion. But their routine is ruined at the event when Teddy pulls a prank on them. The girls demand that Sweetheart un-invite Teddy from her upcoming birthday party or else they won't attend. Sweetheart decides to call the party off. Lancer tricks both Teddy and the girls into boarding his father's yacht, and refuses to let them off until they sign a peace treaty for the sake of Sweetheart. Lancer then brings Sweetheart to his home, where everyone surprises her with the party. Song featured: "An Unforgettable Party", sung by Sweetheart's friends.
22	"Gribet"	George Arthur Bloom	November 27, 1992
After the girls' picnic is spoiled by rain, Sweetheart finds a frog with an injured leg. She names him Spot and takes him to the vet, who tells her that he will be well in three days. Spot causes trouble at Bon Bon's house and Starlight's ice cream parlor. Sweetheart brings him to school where he causes more chaos. Miss Hackney tells Sweetheart to set Spot free, and the girls tearfully release him into the wild. Song featured: "Off You Go", sung by Sweetheart.
23	"Bon Bon's Diary"	George Arthur Bloom	December 4, 1992
After forgetting to study for her math test, Bon Bon decides to cheat. She gets away with it, but is disappointed from her lack of skill. Teddy discovers Bon Bon's diary and finds an entry about the cheating. He tells Bon Bon he will show miss Hackney the entry unless she carries his books to school and joins him at the school dance. After Sweetheart has a talk with Teddy, in which she, in turn, blackmails him, he hands the diary to Miss Hackney and Bon Bon confesses that she cheated. Miss Hackney returns the diary and has Bon Bon retake the test. Bon Bon passes, but Teddy has flunked his test. Bon Bon offers to study with him so they can pass the next test. Song featured: "Secrets", sung by the 7 Pony Friends.
24	"Just for Kicks"	George Arthur Bloom	December 11, 1992
Starlight has a crush on Ace, but he does not feel the same about her and ignores her. Starlight joins the soccer team to win his heart. When Ace humiliates her in front of the team, Starlight wants to quit, but Patch convinces her to stay and train for the upcoming soccer match. The day of the match, Starlight scores the winning goal, which makes Ace jealous instead of impressed. But Ace eventually comes around, praises Starlight for the goal and accepts her as a member of the team. Song featured: "Perfect Pair", sung by Starlight
25	"Ponies in Paradise"	Kayte Kuch & Sheryl Scarborough	December 18, 1992
Bright Eyes attends an exchange trip to a tropical island. Her friends are worried about sea monsters, cannibals and natives that might use her as a sacrifice for a volcano. Bright Eyes dismisses those ideas. Once at the island, she stays with the Sunbright family. Bright Eyes becomes worried when the Sunbrights take her on a hike to the volcano. She nearly falls into the crater but is rescued by the Sunbrights. She cheers up and enjoys the rest of the activities. Song featured: "We May Be Different...", sung by Bright Eyes and Moki.
26	"Who's Responsible"	Roger Slifer	December 25, 1992
Bright Eyes tells her friends about a garbage pollution problem at Big Pony River. They split into teams to track down the responsible dumpers, but in the process, they unwittingly add to the litter. Pony River gets clogged and floods. After the grownups unclog the river, the girls see the trash they previously tossed and help the grownups with the clean-up. Song featured: "A Lot Less Litter", sung by the 7 Pony Friends.

== Merchandise ==
In 1992, Hasbro released toys of the 7 Pony Friends to the European market to complement its first generation My Little Pony toy line. They did not produce models for the three male ponies or the teacher from the series, Miss Hackney. Although My Little Pony originated in the United States, the toys were not marketed there. The family ponies, the Barringtons (known as the Berrytowns in toy form), the Sunbrights, and the Meadowsweets were also made into toys, but were only marketed in select European countries. Several pieces of merchandise were marketed in Europe with the Seven Characters on them, such as comic books, an alarm clock, a backpack, an umbrella and a money box.

== Media ==
=== Australia ===
In 2005, MRA Entertainment released the complete series in the country on four DVD sets.

=== United Kingdom ===
In the United Kingdom, a single DVD containing ten episodes from the series was released by Metrodome Distribution in August 2004. Metrodome's "Girls World" and "Girls World 2" DVDs (released in February 2004 and May 2005, respectively) contain two episodes each from the series, "Girls World" has "Bon Bon's Diary / Just For Kicks" and "Girls World 2" has "Princess Problems / An Apple for Starlight". However, the latter episode was not released as part of the standalone DVD.

=== United States ===
Shout Factory licensed the series for the United States (Region 1) area. It was released as My Little Pony Tales – The Complete TV Series on DVD on April 28, 2015. The two-disc set contains all 26 episodes of the series.
