= My Little Pony: A New Generation =

2021 animated film

- Official release poster
- Directed by: Robert Cullen; José Luis Ucha
- Screenplay by: Gillian M. Berrow; Tim Sullivan
- Story by: Robert Cullen; José Luis Ucha; Tim Sullivan
- Based on: My Little Pony by Bonnie Zacherle and Hasbro and characters from My Little Pony: Friendship Is Magic by Lauren Faust and Hasbro
- Produced by: Cecil Kramer; Peter Lewis
- Starring: Vanessa Hudgens; Kimiko Glenn; James Marsden; Sofia Carson; Liza Koshy; Ken Jeong; Elizabeth Perkins; Jane Krakowski; Michael McKean; Phil LaMarr
- Cinematography: Todd Heapy
- Edited by: Inbal Elazari
- Music by: Heitor Pereira (score); Alan Schmuckler (songs); Michael Mahler (songs)
- Production companies: Netflix Animation Studios; Entertainment One; Boulder Media
- Distributed by: Netflix
- Release dates: September 8, 2021 (TIFF); September 24, 2021
- Running time: 91 minutes
- Countries: Canada; United States; Ireland
- Language: English
- Box office: $4.1 million (International)

My Little Pony: A New Generation is a 2021 animated adventure comedy film, based on the My Little Pony toy line. It features the voices of Vanessa Hudgens, Kimiko Glenn, James Marsden, Sofia Carson, Liza Koshy, Ken Jeong, Elizabeth Perkins, Jane Krakowski, Michael McKean and Phil LaMarr. A sequel to the television series My Little Pony: Friendship Is Magic, the film tells the story of earth pony Sunny Starscout, who embarks on a quest to reunite all pony kinds and restore magic to the land.

My Little Pony: A New Generation had its world premiere at the Toronto International Film Festival on September 8, 2021. It was originally set to be released theatrically by Paramount Pictures, but due to the COVID-19 pandemic, the film was instead released in most countries on Netflix on September 24, 2021, while still being theatrically released in several Asian countries. The film received generally positive reviews from critics, and was the most-viewed film on Netflix in October 2021. It was followed by two sequel series, My Little Pony: Tell Your Tale and My Little Pony: Make Your Mark, while a sing-along version of the film was released in 2022.

== Plot ==
In the earth pony town of Maretime Bay, Argyle Starshine teaches his daughter Sunny Starscout about tales of old Equestria when earth ponies, pegasi and unicorns lived in harmony. Although most earth ponies dismiss these ideas as myths and now live in fear of the other races, Sunny hopes that all races can make amends and live in harmony.

Years later, Sunny continuously tries to change the minds of the other earth ponies, disrupting a showcase of anti-pegasi and unicorn technology by factory owner Phyllis Cloverleaf. Hitch Trailblazer, Sunny's childhood friend and sheriff of Maretime Bay, pulls her away and prepares to send her back home with the warning that she is jeopardizing their friendship with her activities. Suddenly, a unicorn named Izzy Moonbow wanders into the town. While most of the earth ponies flee, Sunny befriends Izzy and quickly takes her to her home to hide from Hitch and his deputy Sprout, Phyllis' son. Learning from Izzy that unicorns have lost their magic and that the pegasi may be to blame, Sunny travels with her to the pegasus city of Zephyr Heights in order to ask for their help. The two elude Hitch and flee town, and Hitch leaves Sprout in charge while he pursues them. Sprout names himself sheriff and eventually becomes a dictator-like leader, turning the residents of Maretime Bay into a hostile mob and commandeering his mother's factory to construct a war machine.

Sunny and Izzy are caught in Zephyr Heights and taken to meet Queen Haven and her two daughters, Pipp Petals and Zipp Storm, who seem to be the only pegasi who can fly. When Sunny starts asking about magic, Haven has them imprisoned in the castle dungeon. Zipp secretly visits them there and tells them that the pegasi have also lost their magic and cannot fly, and the royal family uses wires to give the illusion of flight. She helps them escape and takes them to an abandoned transit station that Sunny realizes was used by all pony races in the past. Sunny finds a set of stained glass windows depicting two crystals – one of which is set in Haven's crown – that may fit together and bring back the magic. The three concoct a plan to steal the crown during Pipp's performance that night, but Hitch's arrival triggers a series of mishaps that reveal the royals' inability to fly; Haven is arrested, and the sisters are forced to flee. While Pipp is initially angry with her sister, she returns the crystal and helps the group escape the city. Hitch also overcomes his own prejudices and offers to help Sunny in her effort to reunite the pony races.

Izzy escorts the group to her home in the forest village of Bridlewood and disguises them as unicorns before leading them to Alphabittle, who holds the unicorn crystal. Sunny wins it from him in a dance competition, but loses her disguise as she celebrates. As the group flees with the two crystals, they come across Haven, who has also escaped. Sunny and Izzy try to put the two crystals together, but they have no effect. Dejected, Sunny gives back the crystals and returns to Maretime Bay with Hitch.

While packing up her childhood toys, Sunny finds a third crystal intended to join with the other two, built into a lamp her father had made for her. As she races to tell Hitch, they discover that Sprout has turned the entire town to his side and is piloting his war machine to attack the other pony races. Sunny and Hitch rush back to her home as Izzy, Pipp, Zipp, Haven, and Alphabittle arrive. Gathering the crystals, Sunny, Izzy, and Pipp try to put them together while Hitch and Zipp hold off Sprout's machine. Phyllis orders Sprout to stop, but he refuses and crashes into Sunny's home, destroying it and the frame in which the crystals must be set. Phyllis, Haven, Alphabittle, and Sunny's friends put aside their differences and come together to comfort her amid the rubble. In response, the crystals activate, temporarily transforming Sunny into an alicorn, giving her a new hairstyle with colored bangs, and restoring magic across the land. Sunny and her friends celebrate as the ponies of all three races cooperate to fix the damage done by Sprout and a new era of peace begins.

== Cast ==
- Vanessa Hudgens as Sunny Starscout, an adventurous and virtuous earth pony-turned-alicorn who enjoys roller skating and wants all pony kinds to get along, and tries to return magic to the world in order to unite the three types of ponies as equals
- Kimiko Glenn as Izzy Moonbow, an energetic and curious unicorn from the Bridlewood Forest that loves crafting, who is the first non-earth pony Sunny befriended
- James Marsden as Hitch Trailblazer, an earth pony who is the kind and hard-working sheriff at Maretime Bay and Sunny's childhood friend
- Sofia Carson as Pipp Petals, a Pegasus princess from Zephyr Heights who is a talented pop icon and loves to be a good influence on others and entertain other ponies with her music
- Liza Koshy as Zephyrina "Zipp" Storm, Pipp's older sister and a rebellious Pegasus princess from Zephyr Heights who enjoys athletics and science
- Ken Jeong as Sprout Cloverleaf, an earth pony stallion, Phyllis' son, and deputy sheriff to Hitch at Maretime Bay
  - Alan Schmuckler provides Sprout's singing voice.
- Elizabeth Perkins as Phyllis Cloverleaf, an earth pony who owns Canterlogic, a company specializing in products to keep earth ponies "safe and stylish"
- Jane Krakowski as Queen Haven, a pegasus who is the mother of Pipp and Zipp and the monarch of Zephyr Heights
- Michael McKean as Argyle Starshine, Sunny's late father who tells her stories about Twilight Sparkle and her friends
- Phil LaMarr as Alphabittle Blossomforth, a unicorn stallion from the Bridlewood Forest who runs a tea room

Additionally, Arturo Hernández voices Jasper, Thunder Flap, and Toots; Brooke Goldner voices Sweets; Gillian Berrow voices Zoom Zephyrwing; Heather Langenkamp voices Dazzle Feather and Mayflower; Will Friedle voices Comet Tail, Glitter Cupcake and Skye Silver; and co-director Robert Cullen voices Sparkle Chaser, Rob and Wings. The lead voice actresses from My Little Pony: Friendship Is Magic television series – Tara Strong as Twilight Sparkle, Ashleigh Ball as Rainbow Dash and Applejack, Andrea Libman as Fluttershy and Pinkie Pie, and Tabitha St. Germain as Rarity – briefly reprise their roles in the film's opening scene.

== Production ==
=== Development ===
In February 2019, it was reported that Hasbro was developing an animated My Little Pony feature film. Reports later said that the film would mark the beginning of the franchise's fifth-generation, which was confirmed on September 17, 2020; My Little Pony: Friendship Is Magic creator Lauren Faust first hinted that Hasbro was working on the fifth incarnation in 2018, when she denied any involvement on the franchise's next incarnation. On October 8, 2020, it was reported that the fifth incarnation, including the film, would center on a new set of characters, though with the possibility of characters from the previous incarnation appearing.

On January 29, 2021, Emily Thompson, Entertainment One's VP of global brand management, revealed that the film would be set in the same world as the fourth incarnation of the franchise, while still serving as the first entry in the fifth incarnation, being set years after the events depicted in the previous incarnation. Thompson explained that her decision was made because the producers felt it would have "felt wrong" not to further explore the lore and worldbuilding established by the fourth incarnation.

On February 12, 2021, it was reported that the founder of Boulder Media, Robert Cullen, along with José Ucha would serve as directors, with Mark Fattibene set to co-direct the film. Cecil Kramer and Peter Lewis were also announced as producers for the film. Executive producers include former Friendship Is Magic co-showrunner and writer Meghan McCarthy and Allspark Animation president Stephen Davis.

=== Voice cast and recording ===
On June 30, 2021, Vanessa Hudgens, Kimiko Glenn, James Marsden, Sofia Carson, Liza Koshy, Jane Krakowski, Ken Jeong, Phil LaMarr, and Michael McKean were revealed to be the film's main cast. Part of the film's recording sessions had to be done remotely due to the COVID-19 pandemic; Koshy felt that working during the pandemic encompassed with the film's message about "not leaning into the fear". Koshy was encouraged by Glenn to ad-lib lines during recording.

Tara Strong, voice actress for Twilight Sparkle, said in April 2020 that she would not reprise her role in the fifth incarnation due to reprising her role in My Little Pony: Pony Life. Ultimately, however, she did reprise her role alongside fellow Friendship Is Magic/Pony Life cast members Andrea Libman, Ashleigh Ball, and Tabitha St. Germain for the film's prologue; and would continue to do so in My Little Pony: Make Your Mark.

=== Animation ===
The film's animation services were provided by Hasbro-owned Irish animation studio Boulder Media. Unlike previous My Little Pony media, which used 2D computer-animation, the film was 3D-animated entirely using 3D computer-animation, with the exception of the brief introductory flashback, which features the "Mane Six" characters from My Little Pony: Friendship Is Magic, and was done with traditional 2D animation. 48 animators worked on the film remotely due to the COVID-19 pandemic. According to animation supervisor Graham Gallagher, the filmmakers were inspired by several My Little Pony series for the ponies' anthropomorphic design.

=== Music ===
Songwriters Alan Schmuckler and Michael Mahler composed songs for the film, while Heitor Pereira did the original score. The film's soundtrack was released alongside the film on September 24, 2021.

== Marketing ==
A tie-in video game titled My Little Pony: A Maretime Bay Adventure was released for Microsoft Windows, Nintendo Switch, PlayStation 4, and Xbox One on May 27, 2022, and for Google Stadia on June 28, 2022.

Great American Cookies produced marketing tie-ins for My Little Pony: A New Generation in North America, while Dairy Queen produced marketing tie-ins for the film in Mexico.

== Release ==
My Little Pony: A New Generation’s world premiere took place on September 8, 2021, for the first time to the public as the grand opening matinee of an international children’s competition in the Championship Finals category for a young audience during the opening night of the Toronto International Film Festival Grand Opening Celebration’s Fanfare Highlights Showcase event as a special TIFF headliner. It was later released on September 24, 2021, by Netflix. It was originally slated to be released theatrically by Paramount Pictures on the same day. However, due to the COVID-19 pandemic, Entertainment One (later known as Lionsgate Canada) later sold the distribution rights excluding China, which it retained, to Netflix in February 2021.

In some regions, the film was released theatrically as well as on Netflix. In Russia, the film was distributed by Central Partnership and was released theatrically on September 23, 2021; the early premiere screenings were held in multiple locations on September 18. In Hong Kong, the film is being distributed by Intercontinental Group and was released theatrically in Cantonese and English on September 22, 2021. In South Korea, the film is being distributed by BoXoo Entertainment and was also released theatrically on September 22. In Singapore and Taiwan, the film was distributed by Encore Films and GaragePlay respectively, and was released theatrically on September 24, 2021. A singalong version of the film was released on Netflix on July 18, 2022.

After the film was released on Netflix, several television channels have aired the film by number of countries. The film had its television debut on Karusel in Russia on December 25, 2021, at 7:00 PM. The film also premiered on other channels such as 9Go! In Australia, Treehouse TV in Canada, TV2 in Hungary, Nova Cinema in Czech Republic, Nickelodeon in the Philippines, Channel 5 in Singapore, TVP ABC in Poland, Gulli in France and Boomerang in Italy.

The film became available for purchase on April 26, 2022, on other platforms such as Amazon Prime Video, Redbox, Sky Store and Microsoft Store.

== Reception ==
=== Box office ===
The film grossed $1.5 million internationally, including $1.4 million in Russia and $36,788 in South Korea across 1694 theaters. A New Generation opened in 1677 theaters in Russia and South Korea, and grossed $726,619 in the former and $16,304 in the latter on the opening weekend.

Three days after its home media release, A New Generation became the second-most popular film on Netflix, and stayed in the top three for the rest of the week. It was the most-viewed film of October 2021 on Netflix; A New Generation was also the twenty-first most-watched film of 2021.

=== Critical response ===
On Rotten Tomatoes, the film has a rating of 92% based on 12 reviews with an average rating of 7.40/10. Courtney Howard from Variety gave the film a mostly positive review. She praised the film for "‍[retaining] its predecessors' lively, spirited drive centered on friendship, empowerment and magic," though was critical of some plot aspects. Beatrice Loayza of The New York Times gave an overall mixed review of the film, mainly criticizing the switch from traditional animation to "creepily-anthropomorphized, digitally-animated brethren"; she compared some plot points to Raya and the Last Dragon, which was released earlier in the year. But overall, Loayza said, "...the film's messaging about unity and the need for a new generation to band together against misinformation and rabble rousing isn't the worst thing."

=== Accolades ===
Year	Award	Category	Nominee	Result	Ref.
2021	Ursa Major Awards	Best Motion Picture	Robert Cullen and José Luis Ucha	Nominated	

== Follow-ups ==
Prior to the film's release, during the 2021 Hasbro Investor Event in February that year, the company announced three untitled projects tied to the fifth incarnation of the toyline, referred to as the Generation 5 (G5) as part of their My Little Pony content slate for 2022—an animated web series and two Netflix specials.

Following the cancellation of the film's theatrical release, Hasbro and Netflix later announced a fourth project—an animated streaming television series titled My Little Pony: Make Your Mark—would also be released on the streaming platform, following the film. Jenna Warren, Maitreyi Ramakrishnan, Ana Sani, AJ Bridel, and J.J. Gerber were revealed as the voice cast for the "Mane 5"—the characters of Sunny Starscout, Zipp Storm, Izzy Moonbow, Pipp Petals, and Hitch Trailblazer—in all four projects. Developed by Gillian Berrow (who also served as an animation writer and literary author on the Equestria Girls franchise and Friendship Is Magic television series) and co-produced by the Canadian animation studio Atomic Cartoons and Entertainment One, My Little Pony: Make Your Mark debuted with the special "Make Your Mark" on May 26, 2022, that served as set-up for the main eight-episode series which premiered on September 26, 2022, on Netflix.

A 2D animated made-for-YouTube short-form web series, My Little Pony: Tell Your Tale, premiered on April 7, 2022, with episodes being released weekly. The series is produced by Malaysian animation studio Lil Critter Workshop, and is expected to consist of 70 episodes, with Gretchen Mallorie serving as story writer.

An animated Christmas-themed special, My Little Pony: Winter Wishday, premiered on November 21, 2022, on Netflix, tied to the Make Your Mark series.

A comic series following up on the movie was announced by IDW Publishing in February 2022, and began publication in late May the same year. Its plot reveals and explores the events which led to the loss of magic in Equestria prior to the film, and what happened to the characters and settings from Friendship Is Magic.
