= My Little Pony: Tell Your Tale =

Animated YouTube series

- Also known as: TYT
- Genre: Fantasy; Comedy
- Based on: My Little Pony by Bonnie Zacherle, My Little Pony: A New Generation by Robert Cullen and José Luis Ucha, and My Little Pony: Make Your Mark by Gillian Berrow
- Written by: Gretchen Mallorie
- No. of seasons: 2
- No. of episodes: 93 (+1 special)

Production
- Producer: David Flack
- Running time: 5 minutes 22 minutes (special)
- Production companies: Entertainment One (season 1); Hasbro Entertainment (season 2)

Original release
- Network: YouTube
- Release: April 7, 2022 – October 17, 2024

My Little Pony: Tell Your Tale is an animated web series, produced by Entertainment One in its first season and Hasbro Entertainment thereafter, that is tied to the fifth generation (or "G5") of the My Little Pony franchise. The first season premiered on YouTube on April 7, 2022, serving as a sequel to My Little Pony: A New Generation and as supplementary content for the Netflix series My Little Pony: Make Your Mark.

Following the conclusion of Make Your Mark on November 23, 2023, Tell Your Tale became the primary series of the fifth generation. The first season concluded after 70 episodes on December 21, 2023, and the second season premiered on January 11, 2024. The second and final season concluded prematurely after 23 episodes and 1 special on October 17, 2024, ending the series. The series primarily consists of 5-minute episodes, though a 22-minute special has also been released.

On March 27, 2023, My Little Pony: Tell Your Tale was added to Netflix.

== Plot ==
The show's first season takes place in the aftermath of My Little Pony: A New Generation and concurrently with My Little Pony: Make Your Mark while the second season follows the events of Make Your Mark. While largely episodic adventures, the first season follows the conflict between Sunny and Opaline, with Opaline using Misty as her agent to cause chaos in Maretime Bay. Opaline, who is eventually defeated by Sunny and her friends (including a redeemed Misty), wanted to capture Hitch's pet dragon Sparky. In the second season, which follows the Secrets of Starlight special from Make Your Mark, Allura is a recurring antagonist who hates the ponies; however, the premature cancellation of the show prevented Allura's story from being completed.

== Voice cast ==
- Jenna Warren as Sunny Starscout and Unicorn 1
- JJ Gerber as Hitch Trailblazer
- Ana Sani as Izzy Moonbow, Windy, and Señor Butterscotch
- Maitreyi Ramakrishnan as Zipp Storm
- AJ Bridel as Pipp Petals, Onyx, Sales Pony 1, and Sales Pony 2
- Bahia Watson as Misty Brightdawn and Peach Fizz
- Amanda Martinez as Queen Haven and Dazzle Feather
- Jonathan Tan as Thunder Flap, Skye Silver, Philly, Rufus, Rocky Riff, Dapple, McSnipps Alot, and Optimare Prime
- Athena Karkanis as Zoom Zephyrwing, Fifi, Glory, Destiny, Opaline Arcana, and Arpeggia
- Andrew Jackson as Berries, Alphabittle Blossomforth, and Fretlock
- Kimberly-Ann Truong as Posey Bloom
- Samantha Bielanski as Jazz Hooves
- Ruth Marshall as Phyllis Cloverleaf
- Elley-Ray Hennessy as Grandma Figgy
- Kaia Oz as Seashell
- Lola Kaplan as Flare
- Sara Garcia as Dahlia
- Robert Tinkler as Argyle Starshine, Sparky Sparkeroni, Twitch, Gingerbread Monster, and Zantorp
- Julie Lemieux as Allura, Bot-y McBakertons, Stardance, and Banana
- Cory Doran as Comet
- Evany Rosen as Violet Frost
- Shazdeh Kapadia as Violette Rainbow
- Louisa Zhu as Blaize Skysong and Book Fairy
- Jonathan Langdon as Eggmund Bunny, Jam Donut, Orange, and Strawberry
- Kris Siddiqi as Lava
- Vanessa Sears as Nova Starscout
- Julius Cho as Tumble

== Episodes ==
List of My Little Pony: Tell Your Tale episodes
Season	Number	Name	Writer	Release date
1	1	"Sisters Take Flight"	Gretchen Mallorie	April 7, 2022
1	2	"A Home to Share"	Jessica Silcock and Naomi Smith	April 7, 2022
1	3	"Zipp Gets Her Wings"	Tom Gidman	April 7, 2022
1	4	"Nightmare Roommate"	Alex Collier	April 7, 2022
1	5	"Welcome to Mane Melody"	Ryan Denham	April 14, 2022
1	6	"The Unboxing of Izzy"	Eric Branscum	April 21, 2022
1	7	"Foal Me Once"	Celina Frenn	May 5, 2022
1	8	"Clip Trot"	Alex Collier	April 28, 2022
1	9	"It's T.U.E.S. Day"	Ryan Denham	May 12, 2022
1	10	"Sunny-Day Dinners"	Gretchen Mallorie	May 19, 2022
1	11	"Maretime Bay Day 2.0"	Tom Gidman	May 26, 2022
1	12	"The Game Is a Hoof"	Ryan Denham	June 2, 2022
1	13	"Dumpster Diving"	Alex Collier	June 9, 2022
1	14	"Alicorn Issues"	Celina Frenn	June 16, 2022
1	15	"Making a Foal of Me"	Jessica Silcock and Naomi Smith	June 23, 2022
1	16	"Neighfever"	Gretchen Mallorie	June 30, 2022
1	17	"Queen for a Day"	Eric Branscum	July 7, 2022
1	18	"On Your Cutie Marks"	Ryan Denham	July 7, 2022
1	19	"Lost in Translation"	Tom Gidman	June 30, 2022
1	20	"One Trick Pony"	Alex Collier	July 28, 2022
1	21	"My Bananas"	Jessica Silcock and Naomi Smith	August 4, 2022
1	22	"Zipp's Yes Day"	Gretchen Mallorie	August 11, 2022
1	23	"Another Pony's Trash"	Tom Gidman	August 18, 2022
1	24	"Starscout Code"	Ryan Denham	August 25, 2022
1	25	"Pony Partay"	Jessica Silcock and Naomi Smith	September 8, 2022
1	26	"Puphunt"	Gretchen Mallorie	September 1, 2022
1	27	"All That Jazz"	Alex Collier	September 15, 2022
1	28	"Pippsqueaks Forever"	Gretchen Mallorie	September 22, 2022
1	29	"Dragon Dad"	Tom Gidman	September 29, 2022
1	30	"Nightmare Night Party"	Ryan Denham	October 6, 2022
1	31	"Haunted House"	Gretchen Mallorie	October 13, 2022
1	32	"Baby Critters Club"	Jessica Silcock and Naomi Smith	October 20, 2022
1	33	"Filly Filling"	Alex Collier	October 27, 2022
1	34	"Sneaksy Strikes Again"	Gretchen Mallorie	November 3, 2022
1	35	"Making a Meal of It"	Tom Gidman	November 10, 2022
1	36	"Taking Flight"	Gretchen Mallorie	November 17, 2022
1	37	"Snow Pun Intended"	Ryan Denham	November 24, 2022
1	38	"Foal Food"	Jessica Silcock and Naomi Smith	December 1, 2022
1	39	"Under the Mistytoe"	Gretchen Mallorie	December 8, 2022
1	40	"Secret Canter"	Alex Collier	December 15, 2022
1	41	"A Day in the Life"	Gretchen Mallorie	December 22, 2022
1	42	"Firework-ing Together"	Alex Collier	December 29, 2022
1	43	"Bridlewood Spog"	Tom Gidman	January 5, 2023
1	44	"Secret Ad-mare-er"	Tom Gidman	January 26, 2023
1	45	"Ponykind Parade-emonium"	Ryan Denham	February 9, 2023
1	46	"Sparky's Sick"	Jessica Silcock and Naomi Smith	February 23, 2023
1	47	"Sunny's Smoothie Moves"	Alex Collier	March 9, 2023
1	48	"The Hunt for Eggmund Bunny"	Tom Gidman	March 23, 2023
1	49	"Mission Imponable"	Gretchen Mallorie	April 6, 2023
1	50	"Opaline Alone"	Jessica Silcock and Naomi Smith	April 20, 2023
1	51	"Mare Family Mare Problems"	Ryan Denham	May 4, 2023
1	52	"Ponytropico"	Gretchen Mallorie	May 18, 2023
1	53	"As the Misty Clears"	Tom Gidman	June 1, 2023
1	54	"I've Seen Fire and I've Seen Rain(Bows)"	Gretchen Mallorie	June 15, 2023
1	55	"Bridlewoodstock"	Jessica Silcock and Naomi Smith	June 29, 2023
1	56	"Diva and Conquer"	Ryan Denham	July 13, 2023
1	57	"Hot Day, Huh?"	Gretchen Mallorie	July 27, 2023
1	58	"Sparkle School"	Gretchen Mallorie	August 10, 2023
1	59	"Moon Festival"	Tom Gidman	August 24, 2023
1	60	"Scents of Adventure"	Alex Collier	September 7, 2023
1	61	"Attack of the Bunnisus"	Alex Collier	September 21, 2023
1	62	"Lavarynth"	Ryan Denham	October 5, 2023
1	63	"Nightmare Nightmarket"	Jessica Silcock and Naomi Smith	October 19, 2023
1	64	"Very Bad Hair Day"	Tom Gidman	October 26, 2023
1	65	"Misty Moves In"	Jessica Silcock and Naomi Smith	November 2, 2023
1	66	"Friday Night Food Fight"	Alex Collier	November 9, 2023
1	67	"The Rise and Fall"	Gretchen Mallorie	November 16, 2023
1	68	"Crystal Ball"	Gretchen Mallorie	November 23, 2023
1	69	"Equestria's Got Talent"	Tom Gidman	December 7, 2023
1	70	"Snow Business Like Show Business"	Ryan Denham	December 21, 2023
2	1	"Icy Prints"	Ryan Denham	January 11, 2024
2	2	"Heavy is the Mane that Wears the Fruit Crown"	Amelia Fergusson	January 18, 2024
2	3	"Cake Dragon"	Tom Gidman	January 25, 2024
2	4	"Jazz Hearts Rocky"	Jessica Silcock and Naomi Smith	February 1, 2024
2	5	"Misty-rious New Room"	Jessica Silcock and Naomi Smith	February 8, 2024
2	6	"Swirlpool Starlight"	Ryan Denham	February 15, 2024
2	7	"The Lone Alicorn"	Jessica Silcock and Naomi Smith	February 22, 2024
2	8	"Bunnisi Beauties"	Amelia Fergusson	March 7, 2024
2	9	"Cracked It"	Ryan Denham	March 14, 2024
2	Special	"The Blockywockys"	Gretchen Mallorie	April 4, 2024
2	10	"Buried in a Good Book"	Tom Gidman	April 18, 2024
2	11	"Written in the Starscouts"	Jessica Silcock and Naomi Smith	May 2, 2024
2	12	"Where the Rainbows are Made"	Tom Gidman	May 16, 2024
2	13	"P + P = BFFs"	Tom Gidman	May 30, 2024
2	14	"Swing and a Misty"	Ryan Denham	June 13, 2024
2	15	"Emotional Rollercoaster"	Jessica Silcock and Naomi Smith	June 27, 2024
2	16	"Hall-O-Marers"	Ryan Denham	July 11, 2024
2	17	"The Tinytrot"	Ryan Denham	July 25, 2024
2	18	"Sleepover!!"	Jessica Silcock and Naomi Smith	August 8, 2024
2	19	"The Dream Team Delight"	Gretchen Mallorie and Amelia Fergusson	August 22, 2024
2	20	"Ooh a New Friend"	Tom Gidman	September 5, 2024
2	21	"Attack of the Vending Machine"	Jessica Silcock and Naomi Smith	September 20, 2024
2	22	"No Place Like Home"	Gretchen Mallorie	October 3, 2024
2	23	"The Water Park"	Gretchen Mallorie and Amelia Fergusson	October 17, 2024
