= Pony (band) =

Canadian power pop duo

PONY
- Origin: Toronto, Ontario
- Genres: Indie rock; pop; alternative
- Years active: 2015–present
- Members: Sam Bielanski; Matty Morand; Joey Ginaldi; Tristan Presley

Pony (stylized in all caps as PONY) are a Canadian power pop band originating in Toronto, and currently based in Windsor, Ontario, consisting of singer and guitarist Sam Bielanski and multi-instrumentalist Matty Morand with touring members Joey Ginaldi and Tristan Presley filling out the live band.

Following two EPs, the duo released their full-length debut, TV Baby, in 2021, and followed up with Velveteen in 2023. On February 13, 2026, the band released their third LP Clearly Cursed. The album was longlisted for the 2026 Polaris Music Prize.

In addition to music, Bielanski has also had a voice acting role as Jazz Hooves in Tell Your Tale, a series produced as part of the My Little Pony franchise. Bielanski also appeared in a screen acting role in an episode of the CBS produced series Sheriff Country.

== Discography ==
- TV Baby - 2021
- Velveteen - 2023
- Clearly Cursed - 2026
