= Nerful =

Action figure

- Type: Action Figure
- Invented by: Bonnie Zacherle

Nerfuls are a discontinued line of toy figures produced by Parker Brothers in the 1980s. Figures are constructed of three pieces, interchangeable across the product line, including a spherical vinyl head and a bowl-shaped body to accommodate the ball/head.

== Introduction ==
In the mid-1980s, Bonnie Zacherle submitted a series of patents which would later become known as the Nerfuls.

The tag line for this product line was "They're a ball to be around!"

According to their marketing, Nerfuls are a "group of bouncy, colorful little creatures who love fast action and great fun! They've traveled far from their tiny planet, Erf, just so they can roll around, bounce around, and always be around children. Make Nerfuls your friend and keep the good times rolling!" "When you take away the top and bottom of any Nerfuls three-piece figure you'll have a real ball. Each round little face is a ball for rolling, spinning, tossing and catching. But what makes Nerfuls even more fun to be around is the way you can take them apart and put them together in all sorts of silly ways!"

== 3-piece characters ==
There were eight characters in the original series of Nerfuls. The UK had slightly different names from the USA. In Argentina there were only six characters released (no Astro or Fetch). They were made out of slightly harder plastic, weren't painted as well and some colors differed. Three of them also came on skates (like Katie from Nerfuls On Wheels). On the boxes the skates were all yellow, but seem to be either blue or red. Also, Barty's head was actually Fetch's.

Argentina Nerfuls
Barty Ball - Father of the Ball family
Betty Ball - Mother of the Ball family
Bitsy Ball - Teenage Daughter
Budy Ball - Son of the Ball family
Oficial Boby - Sunglasses wearing policeman
Michy - Cool cat

United Kingdom Nerfuls
Billy Ball - Father of the Ball family
Betty Ball - Mother of the Ball family
Bessie Ball - Teenage Daughter
Benny Ball - Son of the Ball family
Bobby - Sunglasses wearing policeman
Scratch - Cool cat who plays tricks on Fetch
Fetch - Budd Ball's true-blue ball terrier
Astro - Commander of the Erf to Earth Shuttle

USA Nerfuls
Bart Ball - Father of the Ball family
Betty Ball - Mother of the Ball family
Bitsy Ball - Teenage Daughter
Budd Ball - Son of the Ball family
Officer Bob - Sunglasses wearing policeman
Scratch - Cool cat who plays tricks on Fetch
Fetch - Budd Ball's true-blue ball terrier
Captain Nerfuls - Commander of the Erf to Earth Shuttle

== Nerfuls on Wheels ==
4-Piece Nerfuls
Katie with Skates - Tomboy on skates
Speedy with Tricycle - Wannabe Hero on a trike
Frankie with Wagon - Daredevil on a red wagon
Stewie the Rabbit - Smart-alec rabbit on skateboard

According to their marketing, "Nerfuls On Wheels are fast movers! Snap on any Nerfuls three-piece figure and they're off and rolling." There were four Nerfuls On Wheels. Each one was just like the original three-piece Nerfuls, only with an added toy to ride on. Stewie was known as Stevie in the UK set.

== Exclusive mail order characters ==
There were three exclusive Mail Order offer Nerfuls. The first one offered was simply named "13th Character". This came from him literally being the 13th Nerful in production as he came after the eight original Nerfuls and the four Nerfuls On Wheels. he is referred to by collectors as "Visor Guy" because of his blue visor. Tumbles the Gymnast was offered in 1987 and Honey Bear just after that (exclusively in the UK).

== Rare characters ==
There were plans for a second series of four three-piece Nerfuls that never made it any further than the trade shows. They included Honey Bear, Karate Chip, Princess Deb and Tina TooToo. Honey Bear was the only one from this series to make it into small production (as a mail-in figure).

There were also plans for a second series of four Nerfuls On Wheels which again never made it any further than trade show production. This set included Goggles with skis, Baby Nerfuls with Buggy, Captain Kook with Bathtub and Road Hog with Pork Chopper.

== Round Town Village ==
When the Nerfuls arrived from Erf, they moved right into their new home called Round Town Village. The Nerfuls Round Town Action Playset was an inclusive playset with the Nerfuls Round House, Pet Store & Police Station. It also came with the Nerfuls Spinning Cafe, Round Trip Elevator, Action Slides, Round Windows and its own Nerful, "Ned the Neighbour".

== Vehicles ==
There were two Soft Vehicle Nerfuls which included a two-piece Nerful and accompanying vehicle. Sparky the Nerful came riding in the Fire Truck and Windy cruised in the Convertible (in the UK, Windy's vehicle was called a Buggy).

Other Vehicles included the Round Town Camper (known as the Caravan in the UK) which came with the Rocking Rowboat and Campy the Nerful. There was also the Round Town Rescue Squad, which came complete with a Fire Station, figure Action Launcher, Safety Net, Wagon, Fire Extinguisher and Action Slide.

== Accessories ==
There were two small playsets made for the Nerfuls, the Bopper and the Spinner (each came with a Nerfuls ball-face). Additional accessories included a Card Game, Belly Floppers Game, Books, Puzzles, Storybook & Cassette. There were also two plush Nerfuls - one each of the brother and the sister.

== See also ==
- Nerf brand
