= My Little Pony =

Entertainment franchise developed by Hasbro

- My Little Pony logo as of 2026
- Created by: Bonnie Zacherle
- Original work: My Pretty Pony toys (1981)
- Owner: Hasbro
- Years: 1981–present

Official website
- mylittlepony.hasbro.com

My Little Pony (MLP) is a toyline and media franchise developed by American toy company Hasbro. The first toys were developed by Bonnie Zacherle, Charles Muenchinger, and Steve D'Aguanno, and were produced in 1981. The ponies feature colorful bodies and manes, with a unique symbol on one or both sides of their flanks; recent incarnations refer to such symbols as "cutie marks". My Little Pony has been revamped several times with new and more modern looks to continue its appeal to the market, with each new look being called a "generation" by the show's collectors and fans. The franchise is mainly targeted at young girls and their parents, and in the 2010s, it gained a cult following among adult men.

Following the original My Pretty Pony introduced in 1981, the first My Little Pony toy line launched in 1982 and ran until 1992 in the United States and 1995 globally. The success of the toys led to several animated adaptations, including two TV specials, a feature-length film, and two television series. Despite selling 150 million pony toys throughout the decade, Hasbro discontinued the toy line due to increased competition.

My Little Pony was revived in 1997, but the new toys proved unpopular and were discontinued in 1999. The brand saw a more popular revival in 2003, with toys more closely resembling the original toy line; approximately 100 million toys were sold globally by 2010. Hasbro launched the fourth incarnation of the franchise in 2010, centered around the animated series My Little Pony: Friendship Is Magic. The brand grossed over $650 million in retail sales in 2013, and over $1 billion annually in retail sales in 2014 and 2015. A fifth incarnation launched in 2021 with the animated film, My Little Pony: A New Generation, and two animated shows, My Little Pony: Make Your Mark, which concluded in November 2023, and My Little Pony: Tell Your Tale, which concluded in October 2024. A live-action adaptation of the franchise by Amazon MGM Studios and Hasbro Entertainment was announced in July 2025, while a new animated series of the franchise was announced in July 2026 and is set to be launched in 2027.

== History ==
=== My Pretty Pony (1981) ===
Patent for the original My Pretty Pony toy

My Pretty Pony is a pony figurine introduced by Hasbro in 1981 that was created by illustrator Bonnie Zacherle and sculptor Charles Muenchinger. My Pretty Pony is a ten-inch-tall hard plastic figurine that can wiggle its ears, swish its tail, and wink one eye. The original My Pretty Pony was followed by My Pretty Pony and Beautiful Baby, which came with an additional smaller "baby" pony figure. This was followed by pink and yellow versions of the original that have the now-hallmark symbol on the ponies' backsides, which preceded the My Little Pony figurines.

=== 1982–1992 ===
After the relative lack of success of the My Pretty Pony toy line, Hasbro introduced six smaller and colorful versions of the toy in 1982, sold under the title My Little Pony. The toy line led to many more merchandise under the My Little Pony brand, which later became unofficially known as the "Generation One" or "G1" of My Little Pony among collectors. This incarnation ended in 1992 in the United States, but was marketed internationally until 1995. Animations from mid-1980s (My Little Pony animated special, My Little Pony: Escape from Catrina, My Little Pony: The Movie and My Little Pony segment within My Little Pony 'n Friends anthology series) and My Little Pony Tales from 1992 accompanied the line-up.

=== 1997–1999 ===
My Little Pony (1997–1999)
- Original work: Toys

Games
- Video game: My Little Pony: Friendship Gardens (1998)

Miscellaneous
- Toy: My Little Pony

The 1997 incarnation was marketed by Hasbro as "Friendship Garden" and designated "Generation 2" by collectors. They were manufactured in redesigned poses with jewel eyes and turning heads and are smaller, slimmer, and longer-legged than their 1982 counterparts. The line was not successful in the U.S. and was discontinued in 1999, although it continued overseas for several years. Since the second generation was more popular in Western Europe, Hasbro continued to produce and sell them in Western Europe after 1998. Most were Earth Ponies, but a few unicorns were made internationally. Although no Pegasus Ponies were made, some adults had clip-on wings. In the early 2000s, several unicorns with clip-on wings (called the Magic Unicorns) were made. Two baby ponies were introduced, and none of the baby ponies were sold in the United States.

In Europe, the main location was renamed Ponyland instead of Friendship Gardens, and were discontinued with the inception of the "G3" toyline in 2003. Many ponies released in the last years of the line are considered rare. A number of playsets were introduced, including a mansion and a castle. Some of the licensed merchandise released in Europe included beanbag plushies, magazines, clothing, perfume, wrapping paper and coloring books. A CD-ROM game for PC, Friendship Gardens, was also released, which involved taking care of a pony and playing games along the way.

Some "Generation Two" ponies were sold as detachable key chains, including Morning Glory, Sundance, Light Heart and Ivy. Each pony comes with a comb attached to her neck by a string. The back of the package says, "My Little Pony Logo and Pony Names are Trademarks of Hasbro Inc. Copyright 1998." They were produced under license by Fun-4-All Corporation and made in China.

==== My Little Pony: Friendship Gardens (1998) ====
My Little Pony: Friendship Gardens is a virtual pet game developed by Artech Studios and published by Hasbro Interactive.

=== 2003–2009 ===
The third incarnation of My Little Pony, which is often unofficially referred to as "Generation Three" or "G3" by collectors, began in 2003. The revamped line of dolls was targeted to a younger audience than the previous lines. Before the generation's end in 2009, there were at least two minor revamps. A series of direct-to-video animated films (mostly produced by SD Entertainment) accompanied the line-up.

=== 2010–2021 ===
The next incarnation of My Little Pony, unofficially known as the "Generation Four", was launched in 2010. It is set in a fictional location named Equestria, and the main characters include Twilight Sparkle, Spike, Rainbow Dash, Pinkie Pie, Applejack, Rarity, and Fluttershy. Television series My Little Pony: Friendship Is Magic, theatrical film My Little Pony: The Movie, as well as other related media accompany the current line-up. This era generated a fandom among grown-ups with the success of the television series.

My Little Pony: Equestria Girls, the anthropomorphic spin-off, was launched in 2013.

My Little Pony: Pony Life, a spin-off comedy series, launched in 2020 featuring a new animation style. (Note: My Little Pony: Pony Life premiered early worldwide on Treehouse TV in Canada on June 21, 2020.)

=== 2021–2024 ===
Hasbro announced the start of "Generation Five" toy line in February 2021, with a 3D CG-animated film (produced by Entertainment One and animated by Boulder Media) and a follow-up television series. Unlike previous generation changes which have featured a completely new world, Generation Five built upon the world and stories established in Generation Four from Friendship Is Magic while including a time jump as to introduce new characters and themes. According to Hasbro's Emily Thompson, vice president of global brand management for Entertainment One, the new line is aimed at Generation Alpha, which "has a higher emotional intelligence, and they expect a lot more from their entertainment"; to that end, the themes of the show will be aimed around diversity and inclusion but will still include nods and Easter eggs to the prior generation.

The film and series take place some time after the end of Friendship Is Magic, where "friendship and harmony have been replaced by paranoia and mistrust" and the various pony species have segregated into their own tribes. The main characters of Generation Five includes Sunny Starscout (a female earth pony), Izzy Moonbow (a female unicorn) and Hitch Trailblazer, (a male earth pony), alongside Pegasus siblings Pipp Petals and Zipp Storm.

The film was originally slated for theatrical release by Paramount Pictures, but the release was canceled due to the COVID-19 pandemic. It was sold to Netflix, with the film's release date being set on September 24, 2021. Netflix also greenlit its follow-up CG-animated series, which also debuted on the streaming service.

The film was succeeded by a special and streaming television series titled My Little Pony: Make Your Mark in May and September 2022 respectively, and a Christmas-themed special, titled My Little Pony: Winter Wishday in November, on Netflix. A YouTube exclusive series of five-minute shorts titled, My Little Pony: Tell Your Tale, premiered in April 2022. The fourth chapter of Make Your Mark, including a 44-minute special Bridlewoodstock, was released in June 2023. The fifth chapter was released in September 2023 and the final episodes of the show were released on November 23, 2023, alongside the special Secrets of Starlight. A Tell Your Tale special, The Blockywockys was released on April 4, 2024. The show ended its run with the final episode, "The Water Park", on October 17, 2024. According to studies of the brony fandom, G5 has failed to capture the "lightning in a bottle" that G4 did, and modern brony discussions still revolve around G4 rather than G5. G5 of My Little Pony was cancelled in 2024, however, according to Hasbro, Tell Your Tale was successful at driving toy sales and fan engagement.

On September 11, 2024, a series of promotional material was leaked on Equestria Daily, featuring a brand new animation style and a pitch video for a "Ponyverse" concept, featuring characters such as Twilight Sparkle, Pinkie Pie, and Rainbow Dash from Friendship is Magic, and Misty Brightdawn from Tell Your Tale for a planned reboot called "Camp Cutie Mark", which was later cancelled.

In November 2024, My Little Pony was inducted into the National Toy Hall of Fame at The Strong National Museum of Play.

=== 2025–present ===
On May 28, 2025, Hasbro announced a "Total Brand Reinvention" for My Little Pony, celebrating the "Year of the Pony" in 2026, and in 2027 with a "new look, tons of new content, and innovative products in the works".

On July 15, 2025, a live-action film based on the franchise was announced to be in development. The film will be produced by Amazon MGM Studios and Hasbro Entertainment.

On July 24, 2026, at San Diego Comic-Con, Hasbro officially announced a new web series, My Little Pony: Forever Friendship, set to premiere in 2027. The series will follow Twilight Sparkle, Pinkie Pie, Rainbow Dash, and Fluttershy on a brand new journey of "friendship, magic, and self-discovery," which will be released on YouTube biweekly with a runtime of nine minutes. Digital artist Nicholas Kole and Lil Critter Workshop are in charge of the art style. The cast announced was Jenna Weir as Twilight Sparkle, Kaya Kanashiro as Pinkie Pie, Ava Preston as Rainbow Dash, and Kayla Samson as Fluttershy. The official theme song was released on Spotify.

== Television series and films ==
Series	Season	Episodes	Originally released		
Series	Season	Episodes	First released	Last released	Network
My Little Pony	1	50	September 15, 1986	November 21, 1986	Syndication
My Little Pony	2	15	September 7, 1987	September 25, 1987	Syndication
My Little Pony Tales	1	26	August 2, 1992	December 25, 1992	The Disney Channel
My Little Pony: Friendship Is Magic	1	26	October 10, 2010	May 6, 2011	The Hub/Hub Network
My Little Pony: Friendship Is Magic	2	26	September 17, 2011	April 21, 2012	The Hub/Hub Network
My Little Pony: Friendship Is Magic	3	13	November 10, 2012	February 16, 2013	The Hub/Hub Network
My Little Pony: Friendship Is Magic	4	26	November 23, 2013	May 10, 2014	The Hub/Hub Network
My Little Pony: Friendship Is Magic	5	26	April 4, 2015	November 28, 2015	Discovery Family
My Little Pony: Friendship Is Magic	6	26	March 26, 2016	October 22, 2016	Discovery Family
My Little Pony: Friendship Is Magic	7	26	April 15, 2017	October 28, 2017	Discovery Family
My Little Pony: Friendship Is Magic	Film		October 6, 2017		—N/a
My Little Pony: Friendship Is Magic	8	26	March 24, 2018	October 13, 2018	Discovery Family
My Little Pony: Friendship Is Magic	Holiday Special		October 27, 2018		Discovery Family
My Little Pony: Friendship Is Magic	9	26	April 6, 2019	October 12, 2019	Discovery Family
My Little Pony: Friendship Is Magic	Special		June 29, 2019		Discovery Family
My Little Pony: Friendship Is Magic	Clip Shows	6	April 20, 2020 (AUS)	May 25, 2020 (AUS)	—N/a
My Little Pony: Pony Life	1	26	November 7, 2020	February 6, 2021	Discovery Family
My Little Pony: Pony Life	2	14	April 10, 2021	May 22, 2021	Discovery Family
My Little Pony: Make Your Mark	Film		September 24, 2021		Netflix
My Little Pony: Make Your Mark	Special		May 26, 2022		Netflix
My Little Pony: Make Your Mark	1	8	September 26, 2022		Netflix
My Little Pony: Make Your Mark	Holiday Special		November 21, 2022		Netflix
My Little Pony: Make Your Mark	Special		June 6, 2023		Netflix
My Little Pony: Make Your Mark	2	6	June 6, 2023		Netflix
My Little Pony: Make Your Mark	3	6	September 18, 2023		Netflix
My Little Pony: Make Your Mark	4	3	November 23, 2023		Netflix
My Little Pony: Make Your Mark	Special		November 23, 2023		Netflix
My Little Pony: Tell Your Tale	1	70	April 7, 2022	December 21, 2023	YouTube
My Little Pony: Tell Your Tale	2	23	January 11, 2024	October 17, 2024	YouTube
My Little Pony: Tell Your Tale	Special		April 4, 2024		YouTube
My Little Pony: Forever Friendship	1	TBA	2027	TBA	YouTube

== Adult fans ==
=== Collectors ===
My Little Pony toys drew the attention of collectors from their initial release. Media coverage in the 2000s reported on collectors' conventions, finding it odd that adult women are interested in My Little Pony. The 2004 My Little Pony Collectors' Convention reportedly had only one man among the attendees. When updating the toy line, Hasbro reassured collectors that it will produce My Little Pony editions for collectors.

Over 4,000 My Little Pony objects were on display until 2025 in Croydon, London in the Come As You Really Are exhibition.

=== Friendship Is Magic fandom ===
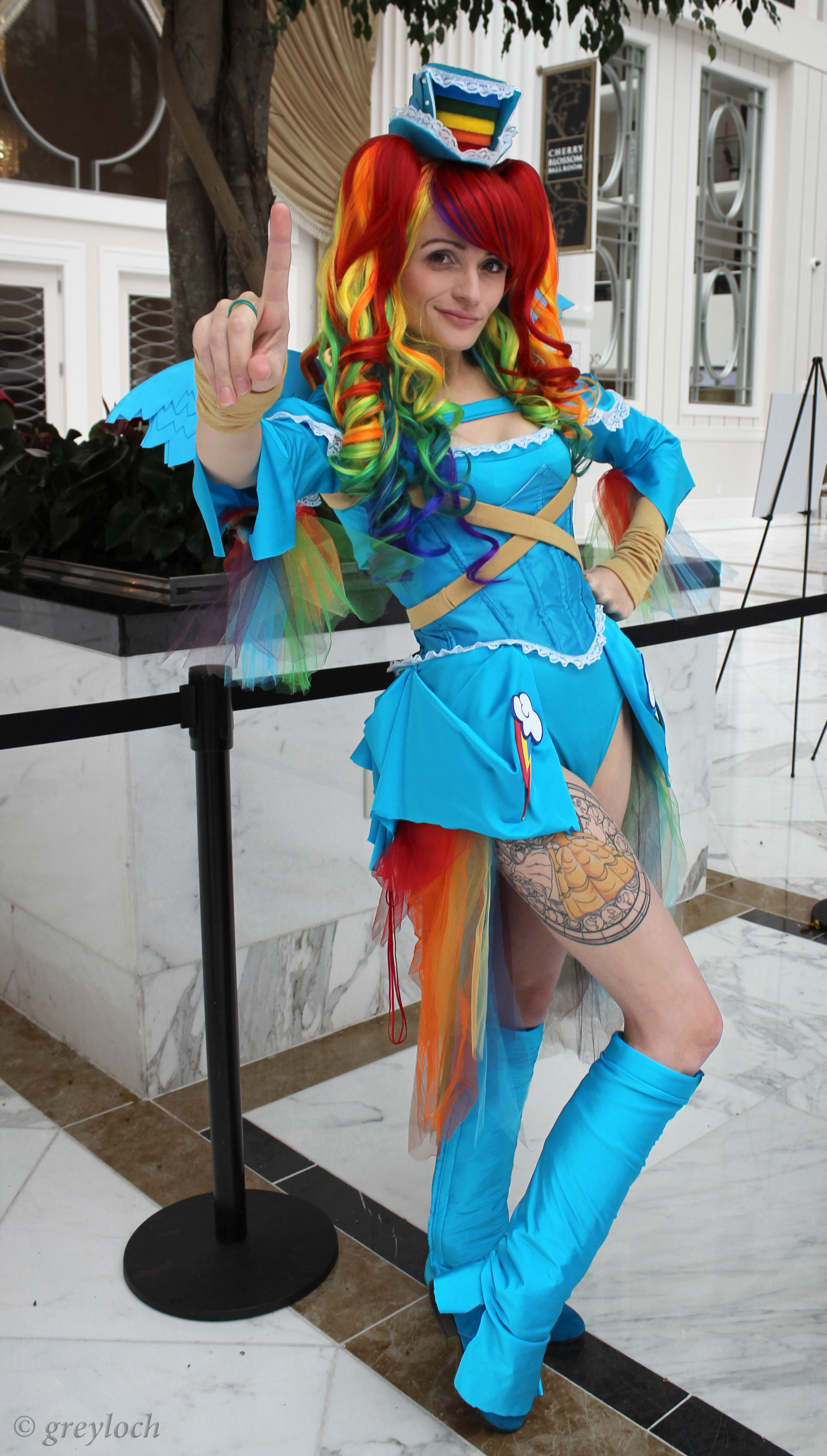
My Little Pony-inspired cosplay (of the character Rainbow Dash)

Despite Hasbro's target demographic of young girls, the fourth incarnation of the franchise became a cultural and Internet phenomenon as the My Little Pony: Friendship Is Magic television series generated an unexpected fandom, with many male fans between 13 and 35 creating a large fanbase and a multitude of creative works, fan sites, and conventions. The fanbase has adopted the name "brony", a blend of "bro" and "pony", to describe themselves. The older fanbase had come as a surprise to Hasbro and staff members involved with the show. They have appreciated and embraced the fandom, adding nods to the fans within the show and the toys. Sherilyn Connelly and others have noted that bronies alienate other fans of the franchise by focusing on the fandom itself rather than the show.

== Social impact ==
=== Consumerism ===
My Little Pony is often derided for promoting consumerism. When the media adaptations of the franchise debuted, there was much controversy in the United States about television advertising targeted at children. Relaxed regulation in the 1980s on cross-referencing between programming and commercials led to toy-based shows, such as Mattel's He-Man and the Masters of the Universe, Hasbro's Transformers, G. I. Joe, and later My Little Pony 'n' Friends. While He-Man initially drew the most controversy, My Little Pony remained controversial for many decades later, even when it was not being produced; the criticism is much more harsh and enduring than similar franchises with toy lines. Sherilyn Connelly cites examples from authors and journalists who single out My Little Pony for being tied to toys and merchandise, often putting it "first against the wall" while sparing such criticism from the aforementioned Hasbro franchises, or franchises such as Star Wars, Toy Story, and Lego. Connelly notes that professionals who work with children, for example psychologists and librarians, often have a positive view on the franchise; psychologist John Rosemond described My Little Pony toys as "great, soothing, quiet-time toys", having none of the violence or sexuality of other toy franchises. The first animated series is often given as the worst example of a Saturday-morning cartoon, despite never airing on Saturday mornings. Even though no My Little Pony adaptation was airing on television for much of the 1990s and no toys were being produced, it was still often brought up as a contemporary example of aggressive marketing through television.

=== Femininity ===
Connelly contends that My Little Pony is singled out not because the franchise's business methods or content standards are particularly different from other franchises', but because it is overtly girly. Replying to criticism that My Little Pony is "junk" while Star Wars stems from "integrity and creative vision", cartoonist Craig McCracken noted that both franchises can have integrity or be junk, depending on how they're produced. Character designer Chris Battle pointed out that the media adaptation of My Little Pony is seen as less valid because it is aimed at girls. Director Lauren Faust, who was creative developer of the relaunch of the My Little Pony franchise in 2010, wrote that she expected people who have not even watched the animated series "to instantly label it girly, stupid, cheap, for babies or an evil corporate commercial." Faust feels that the show's femininity makes it a target of derision, regardless of its other qualities. Ellen Seiter, professor of media studies, observed that girl's television shows are a ghettoization of girl culture, and the attacks on these shows is often aimed at their femininity. My Little Pony has been perceived as an icon of femininity and "girlie-girls", particularly in the United Kingdom. The franchise has alternately been described as asexual and too sexual by the UK media.

=== Fan-made sexualization ===
A subset of the fandom produced and consumed pornographic and erotic fan works, commonly referred to as “clop”.

It includes art, fan fiction, and games. The term clop, based on the onomatopoeic hoofbeat sound, also means masturbation in this context. Clop content emerged on the web around 2012 and typically focuses more on character romance. A study suggests about 19% of these fans, have engaged in "clopping". Critics view it as a problematic aspect of the fandom, fearing it might taint the fandom's reputation.

== See also ==
- List of films about horses
