= Bonnie Zacherle =

American illustrator and designer (born 1946)

- Born: Bonnie D. Zacherle; November 14, 1946 (age 79); Norwood, Massachusetts, U.S.
- Occupations: Designer, illustrator
- Relatives: John Zacherle (paternal uncle)

Bonnie D. Zacherle (/ˈzækərliː/ ZAK-ər-lee; born November 14, 1946) is an American illustrator and designer who resides in Warrenton, Virginia. Zacherle created the best-selling My Little Pony toy line. She is also the creator of Nerfuls. Zacherle has done some outside consulting for Bliss House, an American licensing consultancy, on the graphics and product development side. In 2003, she became a member of Women in Toys.

Her uncle, John Zacherle, was an American television host, radio personality and voice actor known for his long career as a television horror host broadcasting horror films in Philadelphia and New York City in the 1950s and 1960s.

== My Little Pony ==
Zacherle attended Syracuse University and majored in Illustration. After college, her first job was with Rust Craft Greeting Cards in Dedham, Massachusetts. At Rust Craft she worked in humorous cards and studio art, eventually becoming Art Director in charge of special projects. After nine years Zacherle left Rust Craft just after it was purchased by Norcross.

She had performed freelance work for Hasbro Toy Company since the mid-1970s and they had a standing offer of a full-time position for her if she ever wanted it. She took them up on the offer and joined Hasbro as an Illustrator in Research and Development at the company headquarters in Pawtucket, Rhode Island in 1980.

At Hasbro, Zacherle had the responsibility to come up with ideas for kids’ products. Her childhood desire to have a horse was still with her and inspired the idea of a miniature horse that would have a brushable mane and tail allowing children everywhere to have a slice of the experience she had desired as a child. The idea did not excite management in R&D at Hasbro, but Zacherle kept presenting it. She always wanted a horse and she knew other kids did too. She felt the idea had merit and she was not going to let it be ignored.

In August 1981, while working for Hasbro, Zacherle, along with sculptor Charles Muenchinger of Providence, Rhode Island and Manager Steve D'Aguanno of Smithfield, Rhode Island, submitted a design patent for "an ornamental design for a toy animal". The patent, U.S. #D269986, was granted in August 1983.

Originally titled "My Pretty Pony", Zacherle's design was first introduced as a 10-inch pony doll to the market. Although an immediate bestseller, the doll was discontinued in favor of producing a toy line of similar-looking figures under the trademark name "My Little Pony", mostly designed by Susanne Riette in the late 1980s and 1990s.

Although Zacherle's involvement in the franchise she created had long since concluded before the later development of the highly successful incarnation, My Little Pony: Friendship Is Magic, in the 2010s, she has noted that she is pleased that the franchise has grown to appeal to a broader cross-demographic audience. In explanation, Zacherle has noted that she originally intended the franchise to appeal to both preschool girls and boys, although she never anticipated that it would later be written for an older child audience, much less catching the interest of the adult "brony" fandom that has arisen.

Zacherle was celebrated as the Special Guest of Honor at The 10th Annual My Little Pony Fair, where she was further honored as the premier inductee entered into the newly organized My Little Pony Hall of Fame. The event took place July 6–7, 2013 in Indianapolis, Indiana in celebration of the 30th anniversary of the franchise's creation.

Her first appearance at a Brony convention was June 6 and 7, 2014 at Big Apple Ponycon (now PonyconNYC) where she was welcomed warmly with a standing ovation and cheers from the attendees. She returned to PonyconNYC in February 2016. She was also featured as a guest at Everfree Northwest 2015 and BronyCon 2019.

== Nerfuls ==
In the mid-1980s, Zacherle submitted a series of patents which would later become known as the Nerfuls. Nerfuls were produced by Parker Brothers in the United States, Kenner Products in the United Kingdom, and Cromy in Argentina from 1985 to 1987. These small toys consisted of three pieces: hat/hair, ball-face and plastic body. All the parts were interchangeable and the ball-face itself could bounce. There were eight characters in the original series of Nerfuls. This was followed up by more Nerfuls, playsets and accessories.
