= List of Jem characters =

The list of characters from the animated television series Jem and the live-action film Jem and the Holograms.

Several Jem characters were named after pioneers in the history of holography.

== Jem and The Holograms ==
Jem and the Holograms from left to right: Aja Leith, Shana Elmsford, Jerrica Benton/Jem, Kimber Benton, and Carmen "Raya" Alonso

Jem and the Holograms are the protagonists of the series.

- Jerrica Benton/Jem (speaking voice by Samantha Newark, singing voice recorded by Britta Phillips and Joelle Dunn for the second intro theme song, and portrayed by Aubrey Peeples in the live-action film) is the leader of Jem and the Holograms and provides the lead vocals in the band. She is the alter-ego of Jerrica Benton, the owner of Starlight Music and operator of "Starlight House", a foster home for girls (later called "Starlight Mansion"). Jerrica inherited both Starlight Music and Starlight House from her late father, Emmett. Using the power of Synergy, a powerful computer with holographic capabilities, Jerrica can become Jem by touching her special star-shaped "Jemstar" earrings. Most episodes within the series feature the subplot of Jerrica hiding her identity from others, especially Rio Pacheco, her long-time boyfriend and road manager. Synergy's holograms are integral to maintaining the illusion that Jerrica and Jem are two different people. Jerrica tends to compartmentalize her life in some respects, and even occasionally shows jealousy toward her alter-ego, as Jem can indulge far more freely than Jerrica can as herself. Jerrica and Kimber's surname was derived from Stephen Benton, developer of the rainbow or Benton hologram.
- Kimber Benton (voiced by Cathianne Blore, voice recorded by Florence Warner, and portrayed by Stefanie Scott in the live-action film) is Jerrica's younger sister and Jem and the Holograms' primary songwriter. She also plays the keyboards, synthesizers, and provides backup vocals for the band. Episodes in which Kimber is the main focus often involve romance and rebellion, such as her jealousy towards the media attention that Jem gets. Kimber is very sensitive and has extreme emotions, which are often shown by her occasional outbursts, largely a result of her ongoing attempts to cope with her father's death – as seen in "Father's Day", this loss is something she is still grieving. She also has a close friendship with Mary "Stormer" Phillips, one of The Misfits. A hopeless romantic, Kimber has many boyfriends and love interests on the show, but is not very serious about any of them, except for the British teen idol Sean Harrison. In the "Hollywood Jem" two-part episode, Kimber nearly marries Jeff Wright, a stuntman who sporadically appears on the show as one of her many boyfriends; however, both of them agree to call off the ceremony. They even remain friends after Kimber realizes she is truly in love with Sean. She becomes an equal partner in Starlight Music after The Misfits lose the Battle of the Bands (to Jem) and Eric Raymond is forced to relinquish his half-ownership of the company to Jerrica; in turn, Jerrica gives Eric's share to her.
- Aja Leith (voiced by Cathianne Blore and portrayed by Hayley Kiyoko in the live-action film) is a foster girl who grew up with the other Holograms at Starlight House. She is the lead guitarist and provides backup vocals for Jem and the Holograms. Aja was the first foster child adopted by Jerrica and Kimber's parents, Jacqui and Emmett. She is romantically involved with Craig Phillips, the brother of the Misfit's keyboardist, Stormer. Aja is almost always the driver of the group's primary vehicle, the Rockin' Roadster. In the series, Aja is described as being a tomboy and the second-in-command of the group, and also has considerable knowledge of electronics. In "Out of the Past", it is revealed that she had a friendship with Rio when they were younger, mainly due to their shared interests in tinkering with mechanics and technology. This caused some mild, fleeting feelings of jealousy in Jerrica. Aja is the only member of Jem and the Holograms who has some experience with the inner workings of Synergy; using her knowledge, she helps retrieve her foster mother's song tracks in "Out of the Past". She is Asian-American. There has been debate on whether she is of Chinese descent or Japanese descent. In the episode "Adventures in China", she said she needed to "brush up on her Chinese" when passing a newspaper stand, but in the episode "Journey Through Time", the girls at one point wore outfits that represented their heritage, and Aja was seen wearing a Japanese kimono. Aja Leith's surname was derived from hologram pioneer Emmett Leith.
- Shana Elmsford (voiced by Cindy McGee and portrayed by Aurora Perrineau in the live-action film) is a foster girl who grew up with Kimber, Jerrica, and Aja at Starlight House and was the second child to be adopted by the Bentons. Shana provides the synth drums, bass guitar, and backup vocals for the group. Despite Shana's shy demeanor, she eventually became good friends with the other girls. Shana's boyfriend is music producer Anthony Julian; she also designs many of Jem and the Holograms' clothes. Shana briefly left the group to pursue a career in fashion as a designer for actress Liz Stratton, wrongly assuming she was not wanted. Shana later walked off the production when she decided she'd had enough of Stratton's ego. She returns to the band and switches instruments, playing the bass guitar while Raya takes over on drums. Shana sometimes expresses doubts in her talents as a designer, particularly in "In Stitches", when she is needled by Roxy and the other Misfits. She has great respect for Danielle DuVoison, who has taken a personal interest in Shana's work and often gives her helpful advice. She is African-American, specifically Jamaican American, as she is seen in a Jamaican traditional dress with a flag in a music video.
- Carmen "Raya" Alonso (voiced by Linda Dangcil) is the Mexican American drummer of Jem and the Holograms and one of the backup singers. Quiet, kind, and unassuming, Raya won the position of drummer for Jem and the Holograms during a nationwide talent search, beating close competitor Craig Phillips (Stormer's brother) in a drum duel. Raya inadvertently learned Jem's identity and was pursued by Eric Raymond and The Misfits in hopes of revealing the secret; however, Raya never gave in. After Shana returns to the group, Raya continues as Jem and The Holograms' drummer while Shana takes up the bass guitar. Raya is the only member of Jem and the Holograms who comes from a family, and whose parents are still alive; she also has three brothers. She is also the only Hologram who doesn't have a romantic interest.
- Synergy (voiced by Marlene Aragon) is an extraordinarily sophisticated holographic computer that possesses a highly advanced artificial intelligence and is designed to be the ultimate audio/visual entertainment synthesizer. Synergy was created by Emmett Benton and is in many ways considered to be his life's work. Synergy can generate holographic images that are extremely lifelike and synced to accompanying sound effects, rendering them flawlessly convincing, even though they aren't solid. As such, they often serve as Jem's secret weapon in times of distress. Synergy's images can be generated over vast distances, with Jem having utilized them even when in other countries or on other continents. Synergy's artificial intelligence, appearance, and voice are all based on the likeness of Emmett's late wife, Jacqui. Synergy was intended to be a surrogate mentor, friend, and maternal figure to Jerrica and Kimber. She manifests herself physically as a hologram in the form of a light purple-skinned woman, with dark purple hair and eyes, when she chooses to physically interact; she communicates with Jem remotely via a pair of Jemstar earrings. While she normally follows Jerrica's instructions, Synergy is fully capable of independent thought and action.

== The Misfits ==
The Misfits from left to right: Roxanne "Roxy" Pelligrini, Mary "Stormer" Phillips, Phyllis "Pizzazz" Gabor, and Sheila "Jetta" Burns

The Misfits are a rival band of Jem and the Holograms.

- Phyllis "Pizzazz" Gabor (speaking voice by Patricia Alice Albrecht, singing voice recorded by Ellen Bernfeld and portrayed by Kesha in the live-action film) is an archetypal spoiled rich girl, Pizzazz is the lead vocalist and guitarist of The Misfits. Pizzazz was raised by her tycoon father, Harvey. She is the primary antagonist of the show. Constantly trying to upstage Jem and The Holograms, she is attracted to Rio (Jem/Jerrica's boyfriend), Sean Harrison (British teen idol and Kimber's on-and-off boyfriend), and Riot (of The Stingers). Pizzazz despises her real name, "Phyllis", and is prone to fits of rage if things don't go her way. Although she was raised among wealth and privilege her entire life and does enjoy the comforts it affords, Pizzazz doesn't truly crave them as one would expect. Instead, she desires to be famous and the object of adoration. Pizzazz's anger issues and obsession with fame and attention could be linked to her relationship with her parents. In "Father's Day", Harvey Gabor explains that Pizzazz was never the same emotionally after her mother left them when Pizzazz was young. In addition, in the same episode, Pizzazz tries to plan an outing with her father on Father's Day, which he declines, saying that she can "buy him something for Father's Day if she wants", but not to spend too much on a gift, because the money being spent is "his" money; this shows Harvey's pattern of parental neglect and emotional detachment and his failure to acknowledge Pizzazz's own earned success. The episode ends with Harvey borrowing a friend's jet to fly Jem and The Holograms, whom he knows that his daughter does not get along with, to play at an event The Misfits are attending, going as far as to exit the jet with Kimber Benton on his arm. In "The Day the Music Died", Pizzazz and Eric Raymond succeeded in wresting control of Starlight Music away from Jerrica and Kimber, but it proved to be a short-lived and hollow victory, as she found herself struggling heavily with the company's debts and business demands. This, coupled with the Starlight Girls' deliberate harassment, forced them to relinquish control back to Jerrica. In the final episode of the series, she and Jem declared a truce when Ba Nee, one of the most troubled foster girls in Starlight House, is claimed by her long-lost father. During the song "This Is Farewell", she got kissed by Ba Nee on the cheek, much to her surprise and Roxy's amusement. She is Hungarian-American, and revealed to be Jewish in the comics. Pizzazz's surname was derived from Hungarian-British physicist Dennis Gabor.
- Roxanne "Roxy" Pelligrini (speaking voice by Samantha Paris (credited as Bobbie Block), singing voice recorded by Ellen Bernfeld and portrayed by Hana Mae Lee in the live-action film) is The Misfits' tough-as-nails bassist and provides backup vocals. A high school dropout from Philadelphia, she was almost completely illiterate until Ba Nee, one of the Starlight girls, gave her a children's book to learn to read. She takes an instant dislike to the new Misfit, Jetta, and the two are often at odds with each other. She is Italian-American (Italian-Korean in the film).
- Mary "Stormer" Phillips (speaking voice by Susan Blu, singing voice recorded by Lani Groves and portrayed by Katie Findlay in the live-action film) is the primary songwriter of The Misfits, keytarist for the band, and the overall creative force behind the group, though she is rarely given credit for it. While Stormer does seem to enjoy causing (mostly harmless) mischief, she has never done anything truly malicious to Jem and the Holograms, and often expresses concern over some of The Misfits' more ambitious attempts to upstage them. Sweet-natured and compassionate, Stormer is often pushed around by the other Misfits. In the episode "The Bands Break Up", she and Kimber forge a friendship; feeling unappreciated by their respective bands, both women strike out on their own, join forces, and record an album together. Though Stormer eventually returns to The Misfits (and Kimber to Jem and The Holograms), she does so with newfound self-confidence and remains friends with Kimber. She also has a sweet tooth and is good with children. She is American and Jewish.
- Sheila "Jetta" Burns (voiced by Louise Dorsey and portrayed by Eiza González in the live-action film) becomes the newest Misfit after Stormer, on a search for new talent, hears her playing the saxophone in a seedy dance club. Jetta is originally from England and comes from a poor family; despite this, she likes telling people her family has close ties with the British monarchy. Jetta is also a skilled pickpocket. Extremely perceptive and calculating, Jetta almost immediately begins a rivalry with Roxy for status in the band. Jetta's parents, Bertie and Flo, make an appearance in the episode "Britrock"; like their daughter, they are always looking to make a quick buck. In the comics, she is African British; however, in the movie, her British heritage is non-existent. Instead, she is Mexican American, seemingly taking Raya's place.

== The Stingers ==
The Stingers from left to right: Phoebe "Rapture" Ashe, Rory "Riot" Llewelyn, and Ingrid "Minx" Kruger

The Stingers are a new music group that appears in season three.

- Rory "Riot" Llewelyn (speaking voice by Townsend Coleman and singing voice recorded by Gordon Grody) is the lead singer of The Stingers. Riot grew up in a strict household with his mother and army officer father, who tried to force his values onto him. Riot displayed natural musical talent at a young age, but was discouraged by his father, who saw it as a sign of weakness. To escape his father's stronghold, Riot joined the army; however, he soon went AWOL in West Germany, where he met Minx and began to play in a band. Upon realizing his skill, Riot leaves the band to form his own, with Minx joining him. Rapture soon joined, and The Stingers were born. Riot is charming, but aloof and arrogant. He is confident with his looks, believing he is the perfect man. Riot commands respect and demands devotion from his bandmates and fans alike. He is aware of the power he has over people and uses it to his advantage. Riot's romantic interest in the show is Jem, whom he believes is his perfect woman; he pursues her relentlessly. Riot's relationship with his father was deeply strained over the years, but due to his mother's temporary illness and the efforts of Jem to reconcile them in the episode "Riot's Hope", their relationship greatly improved. The two help Jem and The Holograms look for Ba Nee's long-lost father in the episode "A Father Should Be". Riot's image and appearance were allegedly based on David Coverdale from Whitesnake.
- Phoebe "Rapture" Ashe (speaking voice by Ellen Gerstell and singing voice recorded by Vicki Sue Robinson) makes up the third of the Golden Trio, where she was the guitarist and backup vocals. Rapture is a skilled con artist and is quite knowledgeable in matters of the occult, using that knowledge to further her agenda (and often that of The Stingers, as well). She persuaded Mrs. Farnsworth to let The Stingers play a charity concert by pretending to channel the spirit of Houdini in "That Old Houdini Magic". She milked several Greek townspeople out of their money pretending to be an Oracle in "A Midsummer Night's Madness". Rapture even maneuvered herself into a position to exchange a "chunk of crummy quartz" she got from Pizzazz for a bracelet made of gold and diamonds in "The Stingers Hit Town". While self-centered and arrogant, Rapture is intelligent, quick-thinking, and has a great deal of performance ability to pull off her scams. She cares greatly for her bandmates and willingly takes orders from Riot on a business level – she knows all too well that his charm and charisma will take him places where she also wants to go. She has no romantic interest in the show.
- Ingrid "Minx" Kruger (speaking voice by Kath Soucie and singing voice recorded by Vicki Sue Robinson) is the German synthesizer player and backup vocalist for The Stingers. Like the other members of The Stingers, Minx is arrogant and only interested in herself, but will take orders and advice from the charismatic Riot, as she knows he is a man with a future, and she wants to be there when it happens. She is cunning and manipulative. She prides herself on being able to have her pick of men, only to toss them away once she gets bored, which happens with alarming regularity. Minx is also very technologically minded and can work wonders with any computer or synthesizer. The only character in the show that she shows any genuine affection towards is Techrat, due to his similar interest in computers. In the comics, she retains her German ancestry.

== Other main characters ==
- Rio Pacheco (voiced by Michael Sheehan) is Jerrica's boyfriend who plays a Mal Evans-like role as a road manager and engineer for Jem and the Holograms. He loves Jerrica, but has a crush on Jem, which evolves into something more as the series progresses. Despite his apparent issues with dishonesty, showcased in the form of his fling with Jem, despite being in a relationship with Jerrica, Rio is portrayed as having some anger management issues and feels the need to enforce what he feels is right and wrong. This leads to occasional aggressive outbursts or even tantrums throughout the show (e.g., while shooting for the Jem movie, Rio punches Jem's co-star at the end of "Jealousy" for kissing her, as called for by the movie's script). Rio's actions make Jerrica reluctant to reveal herself as Jem to him, in fear that Rio will feel deceived by her (this is shown clearly through the song "Deception"). Throughout the series, the dynamic of the relationship between Rio, Jerrica, and her persona Jem changes, and a classic love triangle develops. Due to a shared interest in technology, he also had a bond with Aja growing up. In the live-action film, the character Rio Raymond (portrayed by Ryan Guzman) is based on Rio Pacheco and is the son of Erica Raymond.
- Eric Raymond (voiced by Charlie Adler) is a greedy and manipulative music executive who is initially in charge of running Starlight Music at the time of Emmett Benton's death. Shortly afterwards, his main focus is to gain back full control of the company – as half of the stake in the company was left to him and the other half to Jerrica. Eric is not an outright member of The Misfits, but he created and acts as the manager of the group in an attempt to oust Jerrica. He ultimately loses his half of Starlight Music to Jerrica and forms Misfits Music (financed by Harvey Gabor, Pizzazz's father), later renamed Stingers Sound after he signs a new band, The Stingers. Handsome and extremely devious, Eric is a very smart and savvy (albeit dishonest) businessman and will resort to almost anything to sabotage Jem and the Holograms, ranging from fraud to hired goons. He also strongly desires to know Jem's true identity, and has some limited knowledge of Synergy's existence through a private detective he hired; however, he is largely in the dark about what her true origins are. In his final appearance, "The Day the Music Died", Kimber had to regrettably sell the Starlight Mansion and Starlight Music to Harvey Gabor during a court hearing, with Eric keeping an eye on it at the time when Jerrica went missing during an outing with Riot. Eric and Pizzazz got so stressed out that they had to surrender Starlight Music back to Jerrica upon her return. The live-action film featured a gender-flipped version of Eric named Erica Raymond (portrayed by Juliette Lewis).

== Recurring characters ==
- Mrs. Bailey (voiced by Hazel Shermet) is the caretaker of Starlight House. The live-action film features a variation of the character who is Jerrica and Kimber's aunt (portrayed by Molly Ringwald).
- Emmett Benton (voiced by Jack Angel and portrayed by Barnaby Carpenter in the live-action film) is the late father of Jerrica and Kimber Benton. He was the co-founder of Starlight House and Starlight Music with his late wife Jacqui, created Synergy, and provided the initial equipment for Jem and The Holograms, which they discovered after his death. Emmett Benton was named after two holography pioneers: Emmett Leith and Stephen Benton.
- Constance "Clash" Montgomery (voiced by Cathy Cavadini) is The Misfits' groupie and biggest fan and henchwoman, she gets her nickname due to the miniature cymbals she wears around her wrists to get attention. Clash is a master of disguise and usually does undercover work for The Misfits. She is also Video's cousin.
- Danielle DuVoisin (voiced by Marlene Aragon) is a very wealthy countess and a friend of producer Howard Sands. She is a lively and sophisticated French fashion designer who frequently takes young designers, such as Shana Elmsford and Regine Cesaire, under her wing.
- Giselle "Danse" Dvorak (voiced by Desirée Goyette) is a gifted Yugoslav-American dancer and choreographer, who is a friend and constant collaborator with Jem and The Holograms. She also does charity work and volunteers at "Haven House", a home for troubled teens. She relates to the teens in that she was raised in a foster home shortly after her mother disappeared. In the episode "Homeland, Heartland", Danse travels to Zagreb with Jem and the Holograms to search for her missing mother and meets her long-lost father. She also finds out that her mother's dance teacher, Victor Krosach, was obsessed with her and went to extreme measures to drive her parents apart.
- Harvey Gabor (voiced by Wally Burr) is Pizzazz's rich father, who spoils her to make up for the fact that he is usually more concerned with his business interests than with her. This may be due to the resentment he harbors from his wife leaving him and Pizzazz behind. Helping Kimber cope with her father's loss, Harvey finally realizes what he has done and tries to reconcile with Pizzazz, only to find that she is uninterested in doing the same for him. In "The Day the Music Died", Kimber regrettably sold Starlight Music and Starlight Mansion to Harvey Gabor during a court hearing at the time when Jerrica was missing. When Jerrica returned, she reclaimed both properties.
- Sean Harrison (voiced by Dan Gilvezan) is a British teen idol who is one of Kimber's many boyfriends. He seems to be the only one who truly has genuine affections toward Kimber, but he is a bit weak physically compared to Jeff Wright, her other boyfriend. Although he is an on-and-off boyfriend, Kimber seems to be most serious about him romantically. It is hinted in the episode "The World Hunger Shindig" that Sean had a wild past with Pizzazz of The Misfits.
- Joanie (voiced by Marlene Aragon) is Starlight Music's business manager and a longtime friend of the Benton family.
- Anthony Julian (voiced by T.K. Carter) is one of the industry's most talented directors. He and Shana quickly develop a romantic relationship and have the most stable romance in the series. Anthony supports Shana in her pursuit of becoming a fashion designer. When he is put in charge of a miniseries and the original designer is fired by star/producer Liz Stratton, Anthony brings Shana in to meet Liz Stratton, earning her a position. Shana quits the project due to Liz Stratton's inflated ego and rejoins Jem and the Holograms. Anthony remains at Shana's side throughout the series.
- Lindsey Pierce/Lin-Z (voiced by Susan Blu) is the popular host of Lin-Z TV, a music video/news/talk show that regularly features Jem and the Holograms and Misfits videos and interviews. While Lindsey is usually impartial to the rivalry between the two groups while on-air, she is a good friend and ally to Jem.
- Craig Phillips (voiced by Michael Horton) is Stormer's older brother who resides overseas in Europe. He is a professional drummer and meets Aja while she is searching for a new drummer to replace Shana in the two-part episode "The Talent Search". Eric and the Misfits learned of this when Stormer introduced him to them. They immediately tried to influence Craig into using his budding relationship with Aja to find out Jem's secret identity, only to be later threatened by Craig into paying restitution to the Alonso Family after Jetta used Eric's money to hire a group of thugs to vandalize the Alonso's plant nursery, pressure Raya into revealing Jem's secret identity, and not to kick Stormer out of The Misfits when Pizzazz threatened to do so. Craig made another appearance in the episode "Britrock", when Jem and the Holograms appeared at a benefit concert in London. At this time, Aja learned that Stormer was Craig's sister.
- Howard Sands (voiced by Neil Ross) is one of Hollywood's foremost producers and a close friend of Jem. Sands sweetens the rivalry between Jem and The Holograms and The Misfits by offering a movie contract and a mansion to the winner of the contest. Even-tempered and firm on fair play, he does his best not to favor either band. However, when the Starlight House burns down and Jerrica appeals to him for a place to house her foster girls, he bends the rules enough to allow the Starlight Girls to stay in the prize mansion. Throughout the series, he involves himself in many projects with Jem and The Holograms.
- Techrat (voiced by Charlie Adler) is an anti-social technical genius and Eric Raymond's secret weapon. Techrat invents various gadgets that could be used against Jem and the Holograms. He is noted for not wanting to be physically touched by anyone. However, in later appearances, he doesn't seem to mind it so much.
- Vivian "Video" Montgomery (voiced by Noelle North) is a talented young filmmaker from Florida who makes and produces Jem and the Holograms' music videos. She is Clash's cousin.
- Jeff Wright (voiced by Michael Horton) is a stuntman, another of Kimber's boyfriends, and one of the most prominent in the series besides Sean. He is hot-headed, very athletic, and carefree, and he proposes marriage to Kimber in the "Hollywood Jem" two-part episode, but the wedding is called off during the ceremony, after Kimber realizes it is Sean that she truly loves. He first appears in the "Starbright" arc. Kimber rejects his advances at first, but comes to like him after he saves her life from explosions on the set of the film that Jem and the Holograms starred in.
- Zipper (voiced by Charlie Adler and portrayed by Nathan Moore in the live-action film) is one of Eric Raymond's henchmen who performs his dirty work during the first season of the show. He is responsible for burning down the original Starlight House, although Eric only wanted him to make Jerrica nervous. He appeared in the first five episodes with blond hair, but has black hair in later episodes.
- Maeve "Astral" Eldrich (voiced by Julie Brown) is a magician and a debunker of paranormal scams. She is intelligent and intolerant of con artists like Rapture, who prey on the gullible. She only appeared in the episode "That Old Houdini Magic".
- Regine Cesaire (voiced by Vanessa Bell Calloway) - Regine is a fashion designer from the island of Martinique and a protégé of Countess Danielle Du Voisin. She is an avid fan of Jem and the Holograms. Her only appearance is in the episode "Straight from the Heart," but she is mentioned by Kimber in a flashback in the episode named, "The Day the Music Died." Leading to the conclusion that the episode was supposed to be aired before "The Day the Music Died."

=== Starlight Mansion residents ===
The following are the inhabitants of the Starlight Mansion:

- Ashley Larsen (voiced by Cathianne Blore) is a rebellious young girl and the newest member of the Starlight Girls at the start of the series. She is introduced as a troublemaker, having trouble adjusting to her new life, and is a bit greedy, shown stealing from a homemade bank from which the various Starlight Girls contribute their own money to help Jerrica pay for their upkeep. She eventually tries to leave the group to live with the Misfits. While becoming close friends with Stormer, Ashley quickly becomes disgusted with The Misfits' vendetta against Jem and returns to Starlight House, having seen the error of her ways. While she retains her feisty streak throughout the series, Ashley becomes one of the most trusted members of the household. She also dreams of being a fashion designer like Shana and a rock singer like Jem, even going as far as to start a fledgling band, Ashley and the Starlights, with fellow Starlight Girls Deirdre, Becky, and Lela.
- Ba Nee O'Carolan (speaking voice by Samantha Paris and singing voice recorded by Ari Gold) is a young Vietnamese American girl, who is the focus of many episodes of the series, most notably her quest to locate her American soldier father, Martin O'Carolan, who went missing in action after securing safe passage to America for her then-pregnant mother, Kieu Chinh, a Vietnamese villager he fell in love with. Kieu Chinh died under unknown circumstances – presumably complications from childbirth – before she reached America, leaving Ba Nee orphaned. Ba Nee is a major source of the plot for "Starbright", as she develops a degenerative eye condition that threatens to leave her blind, causing Jem and the Holograms to continue with the making of their movie to raise the funds needed for the operation to save Ba Nee's eyesight. She becomes a major supporter of Jem's literacy campaign and ultimately convinces Roxy to learn how to read at the end of "Roxy Rumbles". Ultimately, in the series finale, Ba Nee is reunited, with help from Stinger frontman Riot, with Martin, who had been suffering from partial amnesia from injuries he sustained while helping Kieu Chinh escape from her village.
- Deirdre (voiced by Patricia Alice Albrecht) is the third-oldest of the Starlight Girls. Deirdre is an aspiring musician. While normally level-headed, she ultimately runs away from the group home when Jerrica/Jem and her bandmates inadvertently begin to neglect the girls to concentrate on the upcoming music awards ceremony in the two-parter "The Music Awards". She ultimately returns when she, Krissie, and Ba Nee, who only went along to keep Deirdre out of trouble, befriend a homeless boy named Danny, convincing him to seek help rather than keep living on the streets.
- Krissie (voiced by Cindy McGee) is a young African-American girl who often serves as the voice of reason within the Starlight Girls. Krissie is close friends with Ba Nee and is very protective of her.
- Terri (voiced by Patricia Alice Albrecht) is one of the Starlight Girls, identified by her signature hat and blonde pigtails. She was heavily featured in "Trick or Techrat", which revealed that she was very superstitious and easily scared, which made her hate Halloween. She ultimately overcomes her fear by the end of the episode, after being forced to battle Eric Raymond and Techrat, rescuing Frederick Vincent from the basement of an abandoned opera house, and exposing their latest scheme to hurt Jem and The Holograms.
- Lela (voiced by Cindy McGee) is the oldest of the Starlight Girls and the first girl to arrive at Starlight House after Aja and Shana. She takes charge when Jerrica, Kimber, Aja, and Shana aren't around. She plays the drums and piano. Like Krissie, she is African-American.
- Anne (voiced by Patricia Alice Albrecht) is an eleven-year-old girl who arrived at Starlight House when she was very young.
- Marianne (voiced by Patricia Alice Albrecht) is a nine-year-old Cuban girl.
- Joellen (voiced by Patricia Alice Albrecht) is a nine-year-old girl.
- Becky (voiced by Patricia Alice Albrecht) is the second oldest of the Starlight Girls. She practices the keyboard and drums with the other Starlight Girls, Lela, Ashley, and Deirdre.
- Nancy (voiced by Patricia Alice Albrecht) is a ten-year-old girl.
- Delaree (voiced by Bobbie Block) is a thirteen-year-old girl who arrived at Starlight House when she was very young. She is probably the most anonymous of all the girls. Although she appears in as many as nineteen episodes, she is barely seen or heard of in the entire series.
- Laura Holloway (speaking voice by Jamie Lisa Murphy and singing voice recorded by Jamie Weisberg) is a fourteen-year-old girl who arrived at Starlight Mansion after losing her parents in a car accident. "Alone Again" was her only appearance in the series. She didn't feel at home there, and eventually, her low self-esteem caused her to start using drugs. When Jem discovers this, she encourages Laura to overcome her addiction.

== Other characters ==
- Danny (possibly voiced by Scott Menville, who also voiced another character named Danny from My Little Pony) is a thirteen-year-old boy who becomes very good friends with the Starlight Girls, particularly Deirdre, Ba Nee, and Krissie. He is taken in by Jem after his temperamental father drives him away from home during a violent fit.
- Jacqui Benton (speaking voice by Marlene Aragon and singing voice recorded by Angela Cappelli) is Jerrica and Kimber's late mother and Emmet's late wife. She became a foster child herself at a very young age. Having grown up as an orphan, her hardships inspired her to help prevent other homeless children from suffering the same fate. Just like her daughters, she was once a famous pop singer, but decided to give up her career to focus more on her family. She and Emmett decided to start adopting orphans to give them a home and a family, using their own house for this purpose; the house became known as Starlight House. After Jerrica's eleventh birthday, Jacqui finally decided to go back to her singing career, and she and Emmett launched their own record company, Starlight Music. After opening Starlight Music, Emmett started the Starlight Foundation, intent on using the record company's profits to support the children of Starlight House. She died in a plane crash during the 1970s. After Jacqui's tragic death, Emmett coped by continuing to provide for the children of Starlight House, giving them everything they could ever want or need. His various businesses were successful, and he continued adopting more orphans.
- Bobby Braddock is a delinquent teenager and the person responsible for getting Laura hooked on illegal drugs and later charging her for extra doses. He is the type of person who preys on youngsters with emotional issues, intending to get them addicted to drugs; after offering the first few doses for free, he then starts charging his customers. The drugs that he has are severely debilitating to the victim, causing hallucinations and even heightening existing emotional problems. Bobby encounters Ashley at school, just after she had accidentally dropped her papers down the stairs. After hearing her complain, he gives her the same introductory spiel he gives all his victims, which is overheard by a tearful Laura. Like with all his clients, Bobby offers Ashley the drugs, which she accepts. However, this is discovered to be a ruse, as Ashley's acceptance was just to get Bobby to verbally admit his crimes in front of Laura, who is wearing a wire. After giving the drugs to Ashley, he is then arrested by undercover police officers.
