= Emmett Leith =

American electrical engineering professor

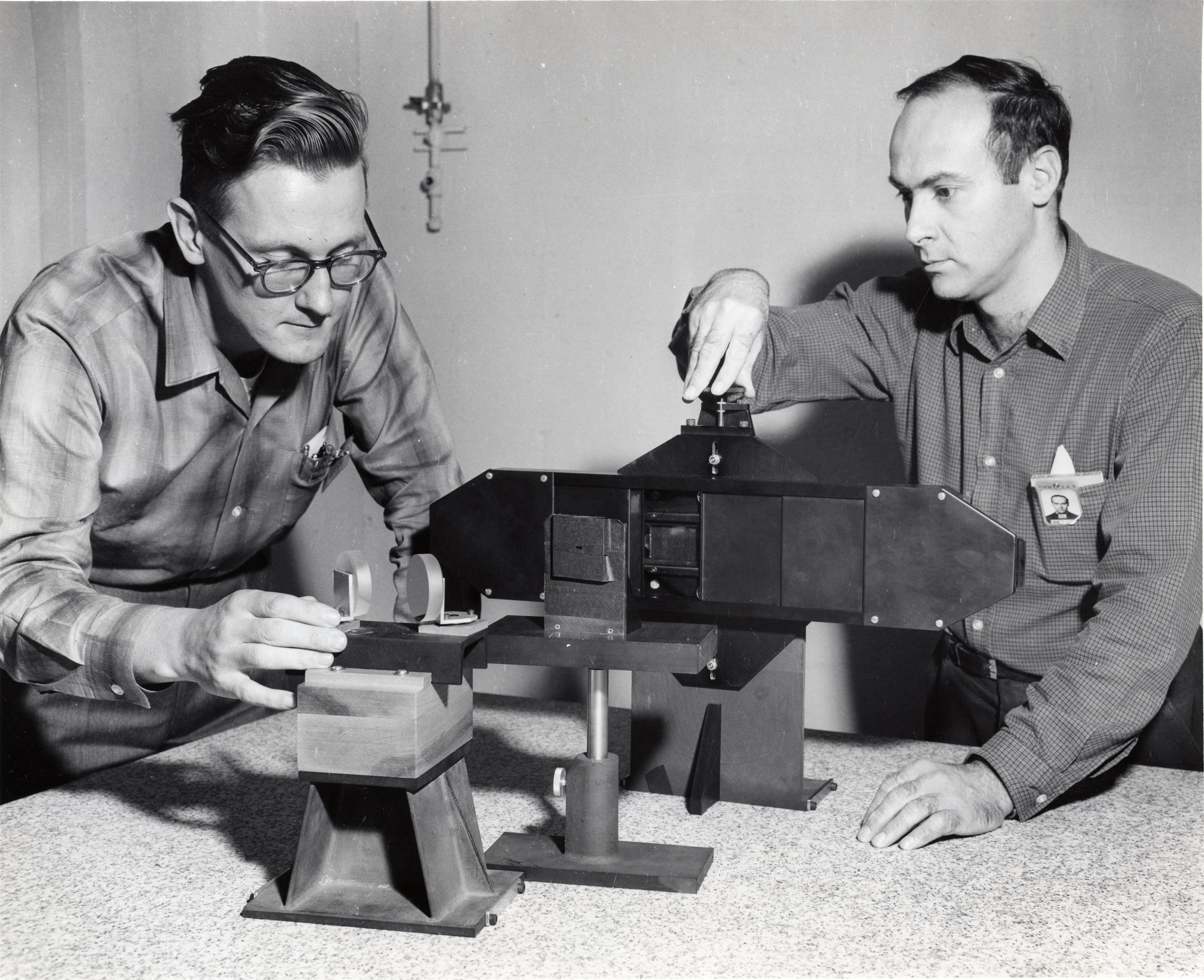
Leith (right) and Upatnieks at the University of Michigan

Emmett Norman Leith (March 12, 1927 in Detroit, Michigan – December 23, 2005 in Ann Arbor, Michigan) was a professor of electrical engineering at the University of Michigan and, with Juris Upatnieks of the University of Michigan, the co-inventor of three-dimensional holography.

Leith received his B.S. in physics from Wayne State University in 1949 and his M.S. in physics in 1952. He received his Ph.D. in electrical engineering from Wayne State in 1978. Much of Leith's holographic work was an outgrowth of his research on synthetic aperture radar (SAR) performed while a member of the Radar Laboratory of the University of Michigan's Willow Run Laboratory beginning in 1952. Leith joined the University of Michigan as a research assistant and was promoted to graduate research assistant in 1955, research associate in 1956, research engineer in 1960, associate professor in 1965, and full professor in 1968.

Professor Leith and his coworker Juris Upatnieks at the University of Michigan displayed three-dimensional hologram at a conference of the Optical Society of America in 1964.

== Honors and awards ==
He received the 1960 IEEE Morris N. Liebmann Memorial Award and the Stuart Ballantine Medal in 1969. In 1975 he was awarded the William F. Meggers Award by the Optical Society. In 1979, President Jimmy Carter awarded Leith with the National Medal of Science for his research. He was awarded the 1985 Frederic Ives Medal by the OSA.

== In popular culture ==
Two members of the Benton family from the animated TV series Jem and The Holograms were named after Emmett Leith: Emmett Benton and his adopted daughter, Aja Leith.

== See also ==
- List of nominees for the Nobel Prize in Physics
