= Stealing Fire =

Stealing Fire may refer to:

- Stealing Fire (Bruce Cockburn album), 1984
- Stealing Fire (Boy Hits Car album), 2011

== See also ==
- Theft of fire
