= My Animal =

My Animal may refer to:

- My Animal (album), Boy Hits Car's debut album.
- My Animal (film), a 2023 Canadian supernatural horror romance film
