= The New Yogi Bear Show =

American animated television series

- Title card for 1988 series
- Also known as: Hanna-Barbera's Yogi Bear Show
- Directed by: Robert Alvarez; Art Davis; Bob Goe; Don Lusk; Jay Sarbry; Paul Sommer
- Voices of: Greg Burson; Don Messick; Julie Bennett; Peter Cullen; Frank Welker
- Theme music composer: John Debney
- Opening theme: Theme from Yogi Bear
- Ending theme: Theme from Yogi Bear
- Composer: Hoyt Curtin
- Country of origin: United States
- Original language: English
- No. of episodes: 45

Production
- Executive producers: William Hanna; Joseph Barbera
- Producers: Alex Lovy; Don Jurwich
- Running time: 24 minutes (three 7-minute cartoons)
- Production company: Hanna-Barbera Productions

Original release
- Network: Syndicated
- Release: September 12 – November 11, 1988

Related
- Yogi's Treasure Hunt; Yo Yogi!; The Hillbilly Bears; Wacky Races

The New Yogi Bear Show (also known as Hanna-Barbera's Yogi Bear Show) is an American animated television series, and the sixth incarnation of the Yogi Bear franchise, produced by Hanna-Barbera Productions that aired in syndication from September 12 to November 11, 1988. This series serves as the final season and a revival to the 1961 series, also serving as a continuation/sequel to the 1964 theatrical film adaptation.

== Overview ==
It contains forty-five new episodes combined with reruns of the 1961 series. Pared down from some of the other versions (the all-star cartoons with Huckleberry Hound, Quick Draw McGraw, and others), this series featured only Yogi, Boo-Boo, Cindy and Ranger Smith, with episodes set in Jellystone Park.

The series takes place two years after the events of Hey There, It's Yogi Bear!, all about Yogi, Boo-Boo, and Cindy's adventures in Jellystone Park, doing their "good bear" deeds under the watchful eye of the newly-promoted Chief Ranger Smith of Jellystone Park, after the death of the Park Commissioner one year ago.

New characters were introduced for the series such as Ranger Roubideux (Ranger Smith's assistant who is chubby and tiny-sized), Ninja Raccoon (a Japanese-speaking raccoon cub who wears a kimono), Ninja Raccoon's mother, Blubber Bear (who is different from the Wacky Races version), and Yogi's father.

The series marked the debut of Greg Burson as the voice of Yogi following Daws Butler's death on May 18, 1988, four months prior to the series' debut.

== Episodes ==
No.	Title	Written by	Original release date
1	"Kahuna Yogi"	Kristina Mazzotti	September 12, 1988
Yogi and Boo Boo get on a game show and end up winning a trip to Hawaii.
2	"Grin & Bear It"	Lisa Maliani	September 13, 1988
Yogi tries to make Ranger Smith feel guilty by pretending that the ranger ran him over.
3	"Board Silly"	Jack Hanrahan and Eleanor Burian-Mohr	September 14, 1988
Yogi enters a skateboarding competition. The only catch is no bears are allowed.
4	"Shine on Silver Screen"	Jack Hanrahan and Eleanor Burian-Mohr	September 15, 1988
A director visits Jellystone Park to capture the life of a bear.
5	"Buffalo'd Bear"	Alan Swayze	September 16, 1988
With his Robin Hood antics and endlessly inventive schemes, Yogi sets his eyes on the "pic-a-nic" baskets of Jellystone Park and sets out to frustrate the comic straight man Ranger Smith.
6	"The Yolks on Yogi"	Lisa Maliani	September 19, 1988
Yogi and Boo-Boo find a giant egg in Jellystone Park and can't believe their eyes when it hatches into a baby dinosaur.
7	"Yogi De Beargerac"	Barry Blitzer	September 20, 1988
Yogi helps a tongue-tied Boo-Boo woo Brunhilde Bear's younger sister Buttercup Bear by supplying the right romantic words.
8	"Bearly Sick"	Earl Kress	September 21, 1988
Ranger Smith is hospitalized for tonsillitis. Yogi tries to cheer him up.
9	"Bear Exchange"	Story by : Jack Hanrahan; Teleplay by : Eleanor Burian-Mohr	September 22, 1988
Giant pandas named Yin and Yang visit Jellystone Park to entertain the tourists and get free food. Yogi and Boo-Boo see this as a way to end their begging ways until the giant pandas get homesick.
10	"To Bear is Human"	Jack Hanrahan and Eleanor Burian-Mohr	September 23, 1988
Animal behaviorist Cynthia Sweetwater tries to win Yogi's trust by imitating bear behavior.
11	"Slim & Bear It"	Story by : Jack Hanrahan; Teleplay by : Eleanor Burian-Mohr	September 26, 1988
A transmission from the Head Ranger about the bears in Jellystone Park gets interrupted due to a storm, so Ranger Smith thinks the message was about him.
12	"Old Biter"	Lisa Maliani	September 27, 1988
Ranger Smith trains his new dog to stop Yogi from ruining the annual Mother of the Year picnic at Jellystone Park. While attempting to steal goodies during the picnic, Yogi gets sidetracked by babies in distress.
13	"Pokey the Bear"	Barry Blitzer	September 28, 1988
Fire prevention safety expert Pokey the Bear is injured on his way to Jellystone Park. Yogi must dress up like Pokey to not disappoint the kids wanting to see Pokey.
14	"Shadrak Yogi"	Alan Swayze	September 29, 1988
Yogi impersonates the Amazing Shadrak to make some money.
15	"Bruise Cruise"	Story by : Jack Hanrahan; Teleplay by : Eleanor Burian-Mohr	September 30, 1988
Ranger Smith takes a vacation on a cruise ship and Yogi secretly follows him to make sure Ranger Smith relaxes.
16	"Bear Obedience"	Jim Pfanner	October 3, 1988
Perceval Pinecone visits to make Yogi and Boo-Boo obedient.
17	"Come Back, Little Boo-Boo"	Story by : Jack Hanrahan; Teleplay by : Eleanor Burian-Mohr	October 4, 1988
Boo-Boo is forced to work in a carnival, but Yogi tries to save him.
18	"La Bamba Bear"	Story by : Jack Hanrahan; Teleplay by : Eleanor Burian-Mohr	October 5, 1988
La Bamba Bear is hired to perform a concert in Jellystone Park. Unfortunately, he's called away at the last minute and Yogi steps in to save the show.
19	"Clucking Crazy"	Kristina Mazzotti	October 6, 1988
A scientist switches a chicken's brain with Yogi's brain.
20	"Misguided Missile"	Alan Swayze	October 7, 1988
The military take over Jellystone Park to test a new missile and kick Yogi and Boo-Boo out of their cave to do so. Things get complicated when Yogi falls asleep in the missile.
21	"Double Trouble"	Barry Blitzer	October 10, 1988
Yogi and Boo-Boo go to see a movie star named Stone Malone who is starring in the upcoming "Hambo" movie.
22	"Attack of the Ninja Raccoon"	Jack Hanrahan and Eleanor Burian-Mohr	October 11, 1988
Ninja Raccoon appears in Jellystone Park and ends up eating the cake that Ranger Smith's mother made for him and the eclairs that Yogi has swindled. Ranger Smith and Yogi band together to try to trap Ninja Raccoon.
23	"Biker Bear"	Candace Howerton	October 12, 1988
Cindy's relative Bebe, a little bear on a moped, is visiting Jellystone Park. Ranger Smith and Ranger Roubideux are pursuing the moped rider as mopeds are banned from the park.
24	"Bearly Buddies"	Jack Hanrahan and Eleanor Burian-Mohr	October 13, 1988
A misunderstanding leads Yogi to believe that he's not Boo Boo's best friend which results in him kicking Boo Boo out of their cave and hangs out with Blubber Bear. When Cindy informs Yogi that Boo Boo fell off a cliff and had to be taken to the Jellystone Animal Hospital, Yogi goes to see him and unknowingly signs up for a blood transfusion for Willy Wolverine upon thinking that Boo Boo is the one in need of a blood transfusion.
25	"Predaterminator"	Barry Blitzer	October 14, 1988
Yogi builds a robot that will retrieve food whenever he commands.
26	"Little Lord Boo-Boo"	Kristina Mazzotti	October 17, 1988
A rich kid kidnaps Boo-Boo to keep as a pet. Yogi tries to rescue Boo Boo and keeps getting attacked by the rich kid's dog. Note: Snagglepuss is referenced in a scene during this episode.
27	"Yogi the Cave Bear"	Wayne Kaatz	October 18, 1988
Upon being confined to his caved by Ranger Smith, Yogi discovers a tunnel in his cave that leads Boo-Boo and him to prehistoric Jellystone Park where they encounter dinosaurs, a caveman version of Ranger Smith in a Stone Age car, and cave bear versions of Cindy and Yogi.
28	"Little Big Foot"	Kristina Mazzotti	October 19, 1988
Yogi and Boo-Boo capture a Bigfoot only to find out that Bigfoot is a she with three little Bigfoot children left alone in the forest.
29	"Top Gun Yogi"	Jack Hanrahan and Eleanor Burian-Mohr	October 20, 1988
Yogi and Boo-Boo visit a Navy flight school and cause much mischief.
30	"The Hopeful Diamond"	Lisa Maliani	October 21, 1988
During a field trip to the museum, the Hope Diamond is stolen and the thief named Boom-Boom Bear resembles Boo-Boo. Boom-Boom hides out with Yogi and tries to woo Cindy as Boom-Boom's double-crossed accomplices close in.
31	"Real Bears Don't Eat Quiche"	Alan Swayze	October 24, 1988
A major forest fire has damaged most of Grizzly Stone Wilderness Park causing most of its animals to be temporarily transferred to Jellystone National Park. Yogi ends up having to compete against a vicious bear named Growler for the attention of Cindy Bear.
32	"Slippery Smith"	Earl Kress	October 25, 1988
Ranger Smith's evil twin brother arrives at Jellystone park and causes all sorts of trouble.
33	"In Search of the Ninja Raccoon"	Jack Hanrahan and Eleanor Burian-Mohr	October 26, 1988
Ninja Raccoon returns and once again interferes with Yogi's picnic raids. Boo-Boo ends up having Yogi train with Ninja Raccoon to master the Ninja Raccoon's moves.
34	"Balloonatics"	Earl Kress	October 27, 1988
Yogi and Boo-Boo see hot air balloons landing in Jellystone Park. They investigate them since they'd never seen hot air balloons before and are swept away into the clutches of outlaws Butch Castaway and the Raindance Kid who are wanting to rob a bank.
35	"The Big Bear Ballet"	Barry Blitzer	October 28, 1988
Yogi learns ballet from a visiting Russian bear named Minska Bruinavich.
36	"Blast Off Bears"	Joe Sandusky and Vince Trankina	October 31, 1988
Yogi mistakes NASA for Nassau and is subjected to several experiments before being blasted into outer space.
37	"Battle of the Bears"	Felicia Maliani	November 1, 1988
When Yogi learns that Cindy is to take part in an arranged marriage thanks to her mother, he does all he can to stop the marriage as he goes up against her suitor Baron von Bearick III in different challenges. What Yogi doesn't know is that Baron von Bearick III is actually a con artist named Bert is and having his chauffeur Jazz Bear sabotage Yogi's chances.
38	"Bringing Up Yogi"	Jack Hanrahan and Eleanor Burian-Mohr	November 2, 1988
Yogi dreams that he marries Cindy and they have a son who is a total handful. Note: Hokey Wolf, Snagglepuss, Yakky Doodle, Pixie, Mr. Jinks, and Huckleberry Hound make a cameo at the beginning of the episode.
39	"Unbearable"	Earl Kress	November 3, 1988
After busting Yogi's park tour scheme that involves paying with food, Ranger Smith takes Yogi and Boo-Boo to a cabin in a remote part of the forest where they soon start to suffer from hunger and cabin fever.
40	"Banjo Bear"	Jack Hanrahan and Eleanor Burian-Mohr	November 4, 1988
Yogi's Uncle Banjo plays his banjo while Yogi tries to hibernate. It even starts to bother Ranger Smith and Ranger Roubideaux.
41	"Boxcar Pop"	Jack Hanrahan and Eleanor Burian-Mohr	November 7, 1988
Yogi's dad stops by for a visit.
42	"Yogi Meets the Mummy"	Barry Blitzer	November 8, 1988
Yogi and Boo-Boo find a mummy under their cave during an archaeological dig. What they don't know is that the mummy is the disguise of a phony Egyptologist named Professor Digby.
43	"Ninja Raccoon, The Final Shogun"	Jack Hanrahan and Eleanor Burian-Mohr	November 9, 1988
Ninja Raccoon returns to Jellystone and challenges Yogi to a showdown. Boo-Boo ends up overseeing Yogi's training so that he'd be in shape to fight Ninja Raccoon.
44	"The Not So Great Escape"	Earl Kress	November 10, 1988
When Yippee Coyote sees Yogi escape from being locked in his cave by Ranger Smith for the rest of the summer following a hang glider scheme, he convinces Yogi to become an escape artist for his traveling show. Note: Yippee Coyote previously appeared in the Yogi's Treasure Hunt episode "The Return of El Kabong" where he was a childhood nemesis of Quick-Draw McGraw.
45	"My Buddy Blubber"	Jack Hanrahan and Eleanor Burian-Mohr	November 11, 1988
Ranger Smith and Ranger Robideaux make Blubber Bear stay with Yogi and Boo-Boo for hibernation in order to conserve energy. The problem is Blubber annoys Yogi.

== Cast ==
- Greg Burson - Yogi Bear
- Don Messick - Boo-Boo Bear, Ranger Smith, Hunter (in "Shadrak Yogi"), Monkey (in "Clucking Crazy"), Tim's Dog (in "Little Lord Boo-Boo"), Boom Boom Bear (in "The Hopeful Diamond"), News Anchor (in "The Hopeful Diamond"), Slippery Smith (in "Slippery Smith"), Evan (in "The Big Bear Ballet"), Jazz Bear (in "Battle of the Bears")
- Julie Bennett - Cindy Bear
- Peter Cullen - Ranger Roubideux, Tourist (in "Bear Exchange"), Mountain Lion (in "Real Bears Don't Eat Quiche"), Jazz Bear (in "Battle of the Bears")
- Frank Welker - Ninja Raccoon (in "Attack of the Ninja Raccoon", "In Search of the Ninja Raccoon", "Ninja Raccoon, The Final Shogun"), Dinosaur (in "The Yolk's on Yogi"), Pancake Guy (in "The Yolk's on Yogi"), Prehistoric National Museum Representative (in "The Yolk's on Yogi"), Biter (in "Old Biter"), Captain Portside (in "Bruise Cruise"), Stone Malone (in "Double Trouble"), Assistant Director (in "Double Trouble"), Police Officer #1, Predaterminator (in "Predaterminator"), Mrs. Bigfoot (in "Little Big Foot"), Bigfoot Children (in "Little Big Foot")

=== Additional voices ===
- David Ackroyd -
- Charlie Adler - Director Sammy Baby (in "Shine on Silver Screen"), Buffalo Billy (in "Buffalo'd Bear"), Banjo Bear (in "Banjo Bear")
- Patricia Alice Albrecht - Minska Bruinovitch (in "The Big Bear Ballet")
- George Ball -
- Susan Blu - Little Yogi Bear (in "Bringing Up Yogi")
- William Callaway -
- Richard Erdman -
- Chad Everett -
- Laurie Faso - Film Director (in "Double Trouble")
- Miriam Flynn - Mom with Yellow Top (in "Old Biter")
- Pat Fraley - Yin Panda (in "Bear Exchange"), Yang Panda (in "Bear Exchange"), Boy in Trailer (in "Bear Exchange"), Yippee Coyote (in "The Not So Great Escape")
- Lauri Fraser - Bebe the Biker (in "Biker Bear")
- Teresa Ganzel - Dolly (in "Double Trouble")
- Kathy Garver -
- Dick Gautier -
- Arlene Golonka -
- Dana Hill - Tim (in "Little Lord Boo-Boo")
- Peter Leeds -
- Allan Lurie -
- Tress MacNeille - Blonde Mom (in "Old Biter"), Brunette Mom (in "Old Biter")
- Laurie Main - Captain Portside (in "Cruise Bruise"), Professor Digby (in "Yogi Meets the Mummy")
- Allan Melvin - Louie (in "The Hopeful Diamond"), Growler Bear (in "Real Bears Don't Eat Quiche")
- Scott Menville - Cody (in "Pokey the Bear")
- Howard Morris - Perceval Pinecone (in "Bear Obedience")
- Alan Oppenheimer - Yogi's Pop (in "Boxcar Pop")
- Rob Paulsen - La Bamba Bear (in "La Bamba Bear")
- Henry Polic II - Corky Carny (in "Come Back, Little Boo-Boo")
- Jan Rabson -
- Hal Smith - Fisherman (in "Shadrak Yogi")
- John Stephenson - The Great Shadrak (in "Shadrak Yogi"), Doctor (in "Bearly Buddies")
- Cree Summer - Scruffy (in "Pokey the Bear")
- B.J. Ward - Buttercup Bear (in "Yogi de Beargerac"), Brunhilda Bear (in "Yogi de Beargerac")
- Patric Zimmerman -

== Home media ==
=== VHS release ===
In 2000, Warner Home Video included this "Attack of the Ninja Raccoon", "Biker Bear", "In Search of the Ninja Raccoon", "Balloonatics", "Board Silly", and "Kahuna Yogi" on its VHS Bumper Collection in Australia.

=== DVD release ===
The show has not yet been planned for a DVD release in the U.S.

== See also ==
- List of works produced by Hanna-Barbera Productions
- List of Hanna-Barbera characters
- Yogi Bear (character)
- The Yogi Bear Show
- Yogi's Gang
- Yogi's Treasure Hunt
- Yo Yogi!
