= All That Led Us Here =

Studio album by Boy Hits Car
- Released: 2 May 2014
- Studio: The Emergency Room Studios (Los Angeles, California)
- Genre: Nu metal; alternative rock
- Label: Independently released

Boy Hits Car chronology
Stealing Fire (2011)	All That Led Us Here (2014)	Waves of Sound Across Oceans of Time (2026)

All That Led Us Here is the fifth studio album by American alternative rock band Boy Hits Car. The album was followed by a tour of the United States and Europe.

== Composition ==
The contents of the album have been described by the band as including "upbeat driving tracks" and "more eclectic songs".

== Reception ==
The Austrian heavy metal magazine Stormbringer dismissed the album as "average". plattentests.de described the production and "heart" of the album as good, but was far more critical of the music itself. A review from crossfire-metal.de was far more positive. RockFreaks also gave the album a high review.

== Track listing ==
No.	Title	Length
1.	"Silhouettes Fade"
2.	"Battles of the Heart"
3.	"Anxious but Gradual Rhythms"
4.	"Quiet Storm"
5.	"The Extremist (do you feel me on this?)"
6.	"Ocean Equation"
7.	"Come On"
8.	"Ourglass (As Time Slips Away)"
9.	"What's on Your Mind (pure energy)"
10.	"Can't Run from Yourself"
11.	"Daregvada"
