= Linda Dangcil =

American actress (1941-2009)

- Born: June 19, 1941; San Francisco, California, United States
- Died: May 7, 2009 (aged 67); Los Angeles, California, United States
- Occupations: Actress, dancer
- Spouse: Dick Hamilton
- Children: 2

Linda Dangcil (June 19, 1941 – May 7, 2009) was an American actress and dancer best known for her roles as Sister Ana in the ABC television series The Flying Nun and Carmen 'Raya' Alonso in the animated series Jem.

Dangcil was a native of San Francisco, California. She graduated from Immaculate Heart High School in Los Angeles. She returned to the high school throughout her career to choreograph and assist the school's theater productions.

== Career ==
She appeared on Broadway when she was a teenager in the 1950s in Peter Pan opposite Mary Martin, as well as in the show's television production. As a result of her work in Peter Pan, the show's co-director, Jerome Robbins, selected Dangcil as one of the main dancers in the 1961 film adaptation of West Side Story.

She appeared as Sister Ana in 37 episodes of The Flying Nun, which ran on ABC from 1967 until 1970. Her television guest appearances included roles on The Judge, The Bold Ones, Maverick, The Rifleman, Stagecoach West and Rawhide. She also appeared in Here Come the Brides opposite actor Bruce Lee. Dangcil also starred as Elena in the 1970s PBS children's series Villa Alegre, which was created for a bilingual (English and Spanish-speaking) audience. Dangcil also worked as a voiceover actress on several animated productions. Her most recognized role was voicing the character of Carmen 'Raya' Alonso in the 1980s animated series Jem.

Dangcil also appeared in many productions of the first national tour of A Chorus Line at the Shubert Theater in Los Angeles. Her last theater role was in the East West Players production of Follies, in which she played Sally. Dangcil also directed several productions for the Los Angeles Play Festivals. She sat on several Screen Actors Guild (SAG) committees.

== Death ==
Linda Dangcil died at Cedars-Sinai Medical Center in Los Angeles on May 7, 2009, at the age of 67, following an eight-year battle with throat cancer. She was survived by her husband, jazz musician Dick Hamilton, and their children, Linda Michele and Sky Hamilton, as well as a granddaughter and two brothers, Mel Dangcil and Rudy Dangcil.

== Filmography ==
Year	Title	Role	Notes
1954	Jubilee Trail	Rosita	Uncredited
1957	Escape from Red Rock	Elena Chavez	Uncredited
1961	The Young Savages	Maria Amora	Uncredited
1961	West Side Story	Shark Dancer	
1964	A cause for anger Kraft Suspense Theater season 1, episode 19	Peggy Sue	
1967	El Dorado	Minor Role	Uncredited
1979	The Last Word	Fabi	
1993	Batman: The Animated Series	Woman (voice)	Episode: "Paging the Crime Doctor"
1997	The Bad Pack	Helena	
2002	Static Shock	Homeless Woman (voice)	Episode: "Frozen Out"
