= Boy Hits Car (album) =

Studio album by Boy Hits Car
- Released: January 9, 2001
- Recorded: 2000
- Studios: Armoury Studios, Vancouver, British Columbia
- Genre: Nu metal
- Length: 45:19
- Label: Wind-up
- Producers: GGGarth; Boy Hits Car

Boy Hits Car chronology
My Animal (1998)	Boy Hits Car (2001)	The Passage (2005)

Boy Hits Car is the second studio album by American nu metal band Boy Hits Car, released on Wind-Up Records. It remains their most popular and well-known album, with "I'm A Cloud" being popular, and even making it into the soundtrack of some works in popular culture, such as Aggressive Inline and The Funimation's in-house English adaptation of Dragon Ball Z Lord Slug.

== Reception ==
AllMusic gave the album two and a half stars with its review by Bradley Torreano says "The best way to describe Boy Hits Car, the sophomore effort from the band of the same name, is to combine the elements of a few of their contemporaries. Take the angst and urgency of At the Drive-In, toss in a dash of the playful singing style of System of a Down, and mix in the generic Korn-knockoff riffing of Hed PE. What you get is a band with a lot of good intentions and a great singer, but lacking in songwriting skills."

== Track listing ==
All tracks are written by Boy Hits Car.

No.	Title	Length
1.	"The Rebirth"	4:02
2.	"Lovecore (Welcome to)"	3:35
3.	"As I Watch The Sun Fuck the Ocean"	3:19
4.	"I'm a Cloud"	4:15
5.	"Man Without Skin"	3:47
6.	"A Letter from Prison"	3:07
7.	"Unheard"	4:59
8.	"Going to India"	3:45
9.	"Turning Inward"	5:59
10.	"Benkei"	3:49
11.	"Before We Die"	4:42
Total length:		45:19

== Personnel ==
Boy Hits Car

- Cregg Rondell – vocals, 12-string guitar
- Louis Lenard – guitar
- Scott Menville – bass guitar
- Michael Ferrari – drums

Additional musicians

- Vince Jones – pump organ, harmonium
- Gregory Kozak – percussion

Technical personnel

- GGGarth – producer
- Boy Hits Car – producer
- Toby Wright – mixing
- Andre Wahl – engineer
- Dean Maher – additional engineering
- Alex "Kondor" Aligizakis – assistant engineer
- Elliott Blakey – assistant engineer
- Ron Vermulen – technical support
- Paul Bastow – technical support
- Ben Kaplan – digital editing
- Chris "Sleepy J" Vaughan-Jones – digital editing
- Stephen Marcussen – mastering
