= List of Jem episodes =

The following is a list of episodes for the television show Jem ordered by the original airing dates. The first 5 episodes initially aired as 15 7-minute segments with each episode broken into 3 parts.

== Series overview ==
Season	Episodes	Originally released	
Season	Episodes	First released	Last released
1	26	November 3, 1985	March 15, 1987
2	27	September 21, 1987	January 12, 1988
3	12	February 8, 1988	May 2, 1988

== Episode list ==
=== Season 1 (1985–87) ===
No. overall	No. in season	Title	Written by	Original release date	Prod. code
1	1	"The Beginning (Part 1)"	Christy Marx	October 6, 1985	5205-08
2	2	"Disaster (Part 2)"	Christy Marx	October 27, 1985	5205-09
3	3	"Kimber's Rebellion (Part 3)"	Christy Marx	November 17, 1985	5205-10
4	4	"Frame Up (Part 4)"	Christy Marx	December 8, 1985	5205-11
5	5	"The Battle of the Bands (Part 5)"	Christy Marx	December 29, 1985	5205-12
6	6	"Starbright: Part 1: Falling Star"	Christy Marx	July 5, 1986	5205-01
7	7	"Starbright: Part 2: Colliding Stars"	Christy Marx	July 12, 1986	5205-02
8	8	"Starbright: Part 3: Rising Star"	Christy Marx	July 19, 1986	5205-03
9	9	"The World Hunger Shindig"	Mary Skrenes	July 26, 1986	5205-04
10	10	"Adventure in China"	Beth Bornstein	August 23, 1986	5205-05
11	11	"Last Resorts"	Roger Slifer	August 30, 1986	5205-06
12	12	"In Stitches"	Mary Skrenes	September 6, 1986	5205-07
13	13	"The Music Awards: Part 1"	Christy Marx	September 13, 1986	5205-13
14	14	"The Music Awards: Part 2"	Christy Marx	September 20, 1986	5205-14
15	15	"The Rock Fashion Book"	Rick Merwin	September 27, 1986	5205-15
16	16	"Broadway Magic"	Marv Wolfman	October 4, 1986	5205-16
17	17	"In Search of the Stolen Album"	Rick Merwin	October 11, 1986	5205-17
18	18	"Hot Time in Hawaii"	Beth Bornstein	October 18, 1986	5205-18
19	19	"The Princess and the Singer"	Christy Marx & Ellen Guon	November 1, 1986	5205-19
20	20	"Island of Deception"	Mary Skrenes	November 8, 1986	5205-20
21	21	"Old Meets New"	Sandy Fries	November 15, 1986	5205-21
22	22	"Intrigue at the Indy 500"	Roger Slifer	February 1, 1987	5205-22
23	23	"The Jem Jam: Part 1"	Christy Marx	February 8, 1987	5205-23
24	24	"The Jem Jam: Part 2"	Christy Marx	February 15, 1987	5205-24
25	25	"Culture Clash"	David Wise	February 22, 1987	5205-25
26	26	"Glitter and Gold"	Christy Marx	March 15, 1987	5205-26

=== Season 2 (1987–88) ===
No. overall	No. in season	Title	Written by	Original release date	Prod. code
27	1	"The Talent Search: Part 1"	Christy Marx	September 21, 1987	5205-30
28	2	"The Talent Search: Part 2"	Christy Marx	September 22, 1987	5205-31
29	3	"Scandal"	Mary Skrenes	September 23, 1987	5205-28
30	4	"One Jem Too Many"	Buzz Dixon	September 24, 1987	5205-38
31	5	"The Bands Break Up"	Marv Wolfman & Cherie Wilkerson	September 28, 1987	5205-34
32	6	"The Fan"	Beth Bornstein	September 29, 1987	5205-36
33	7	"Fathers' Day"	Roger Slifer	October 1, 1987	5205-40
34	8	"Treasure Hunt"	Ellen Guon & Christy Marx	October 5, 1987	5205-32
35	9	"Aztec Enchantment"	Misty Stewart-Taggart	October 7, 1987	5205-45
36	10	"Music Is Magic"	Paul Dini	October 14, 1987	5205-39
37	11	"The Jazz Player"	Michael Reaves	October 15, 1987	5205-41
38	12	"Danse Time"	George Arthur Bloom	October 19, 1987	5205-35
39	13	"Roxy Rumbles"	Jina Bacarr	October 20, 1987	5205-44
40	14	"Alone Again"	Sandy Fries	October 23, 1987	5205-49
41	15	"KJEM"	Christy Marx	October 29, 1987	5205-46
42	16	"Trick or Techrat"	Misty Stewart-Taggart	October 30, 1987	5205-33
43	17	"The Presidential Dilemma"	Beth Bornstein	November 2, 1987	5205-29
44	18	"Rock 'n' Roll Express"	Steve Mitchell & Barbara Petty	November 3, 1987	5205-42
45	19	"Mardi Gras"	Mary Skrenes	November 4, 1987	5205-50
46	20	"The Middle of Nowhere"	Chris Pelzer	November 5, 1987	5205-43
47	21	"Renaissance Woman"	David Wise	November 16, 1987	5205-48
48	22	"Journey to Shangri-La"	Richard Merwin	November 24, 1987	5205-37
49	23	"Journey Through Time"	Eric Early	January 6, 1988	5205-52
50	24	"Britrock"	Christy Marx	January 7, 1988	5205-54
51	25	"Out of the Past"	Michael Charles Hill	January 8, 1988	5205-55
52	26	"Hollywood Jem: Part 1: For Your Consideration..."	Roger Slifer	January 11, 1988	5205-56
53	27	"Hollywood Jem: Part 2: And the Winner Is..."	Roger Slifer	January 12, 1988	5205-57

=== Season 3 (1988) ===
No. overall	No. in season	Title	Written by	Original release date	Prod. code
54	1	"The Stingers Hit Town: Part 1"	Christy Marx	February 2, 1988	5205-58
55	2	"The Stingers Hit Town: Part 2"	Christy Marx	February 3, 1988	5205-59
56	3	"Video Wars"	Cary Bates & Greg Weisman	February 4, 1988	5205-47
57	4	"Beauty and the Rock Promoter"	Clare Noto	February 5, 1988	5205-53
58	5	"Homeland, Heartland"	Carla Conway	February 8, 1988	5205-51
59	6	"Midsummer Night's Madness"	Evelyn A.R. Gabai	February 9, 1988	5205-60
60	7	"The Day the Music Died"	Roger Slifer	February 11, 1988	5205-61
61	8	"That Old Houdini Magic"	Jina Bacarr	February 15, 1988	5205-62
62	9	"Straight from the Heart"	Buzz Dixon	February 17, 1988	5205-63
63	10	"A Change of Heart"	Christy Marx	February 18, 1988	5205-64
64	11	"Riot's Hope"	Roger Slifer	February 22, 1988	5205-65
65	12	"A Father Should Be..."	Christy Marx	May 2, 1988	5205-66
