= Scott Menville =

American actor (born 1971)

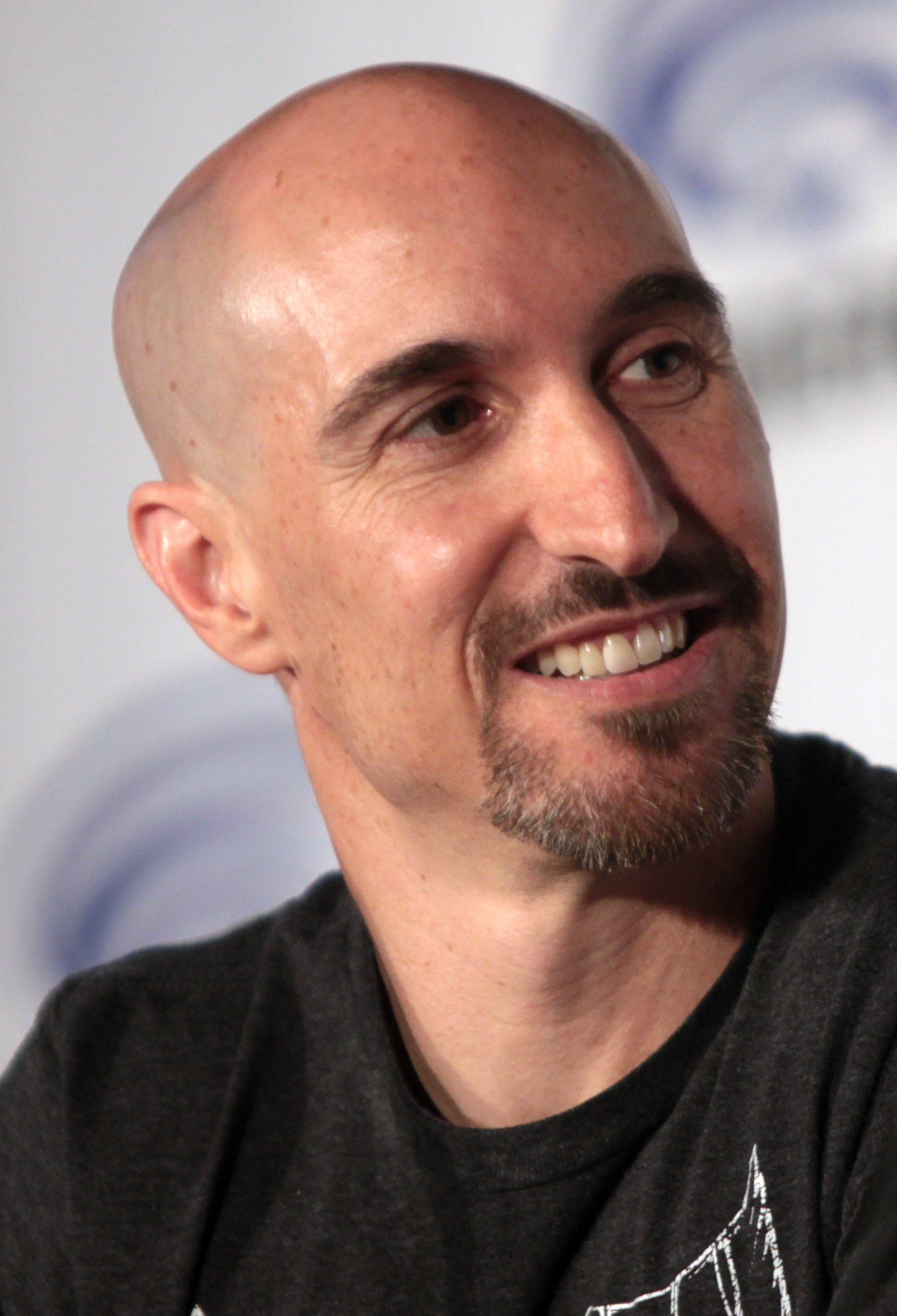
- Menville at WonderCon in 2016
- Born: Scott David Menville; February 12, 1971 (age 55); Malibu, California, U.S.
- Occupations: Actor; musician
- Years active: 1979–present
- Spouse: Jacquie Figg (m. 1999)
- Father: Chuck Menville
- Musical career
- Genres: Alternative metal; alternative rock
- Instrument: Bass guitar
- Formerly of: Boy Hits Car

Scott David Menville (born February 12, 1971) is an American actor and musician who is known for his work in animated films, television series and video games. He voices Robin in Cartoon Network's Teen Titans (2003–2006) and Teen Titans Go! (2013–present). Outside of acting Menville is a musician and the former bass player for the alternative rock band Boy Hits Car.

== Acting career ==
Scott Menville was born in Malibu, California. He is the son of animator and television writer Chuck Menville (1940–1992). Menville’s parents first enrolled him in acting classes at the age of nine due to his ability’s to mimic people and do character voices. His first role came in 1979 in an episode of Scooby-Doo and Scrappy-Doo. While his father was working for Hanna Barbara in 1982, he heard they were making The Little Rascals. His father then helped him audition for show and at the age of 11 he had his first recurring role as Spanky.

He is perhaps best known for providing the voice of Robin in Teen Titans, Lloyd Irving in Tales of Symphonia, taking over the role of Fred Flintstone from Lennie Weinrib in The Flintstone Kids, and Ma-Ti in Captain Planet and the Planeteers.

He also voiced Jonny Quest in The New Adventures of Jonny Quest, Quicksilver in The Super Hero Squad Show, Red Herring in A Pup Named Scooby-Doo, Zack on Where on Earth Is Carmen Sandiego? and Kevin French in Mission Hill.

He has had additional recurring roles as Slightly in Fox's Peter Pan & the Pirates, Joey McIntyre on the New Kids on the Block tv series, Fraz Flub on The Brothers Flub, Kevin French on Mission Hill.

He had the main role as Shaggy Rogers in Shaggy & Scooby-Doo Get a Clue!. This marked the first time someone besides Casey Kasem had voiced the character.

He appeared in Ernest Goes to Camp as Crutchfield and had recurring roles in Full House as Kimmy Gibbler's boyfriend Duane, and in The Wonder Years as Wayne's best friend Wart. He also appeared in nine episodes of The Parent 'Hood as Ira Melman and Shell Shocked.

Menville has also provided his voice to multiple video games such as Final Fantasy XII, Call of Duty: Black Ops II and reprised his role as Robin in Lego Dimensions.

He voiced Metamorpho in Batman: The Brave and the Bold, JT and Jimmy Jones in Ben 10, and reprised his role as Robin in Teen Titans Go! in 2013. In 2018, he voiced the character in the feature length film Teen Titans Go! To the Movies. He also provides various other voices for other characters on the show such as Killer Moth, Doctor Light and Brain.

From 2012 to 2017 he provided various voices to Teenage Mutant Ninja Turtles on Nickelodeon, and had a recurring role as Bucky Hensletter on Randy Cunningham: 9th Grade Ninja. From 2014 to 2016 Menville had recurring roles as Sneezy and Nabble in the Disney XD series The 7D.

In 2016, he played Arthur, the Goodwin twins' computer in the television series Second Chance and Sneezy in the Disney animated series The 7D. Later that same year, he also reprised his role as Duane in Fuller House. In 2023, he played the role of Declan in Oddballs.

== Music career ==
At the age of 11, Menville became a fan of punk music and during his time in high school he began playing bass in local thrash metal bands. In 1993 he helped found the Southern California rock band Boy Hits Car, in which he played bass guitar. The band released three albums before Menville left in 2006.

== Personal life ==
Menville is married with children.

He makes frequent appearances at comic book conventions.

== Filmography ==
=== Live-action ===
==== Film ====
| Year | Title | Role | Notes |
|---|---|---|---|
| 1987 | Ernest Goes to Camp | Crutchfield | |
| 1991 | Flight of Black Angel | Teen in Store | TV film |
| 1996 | Norma Jean & Marilyn | 'Misfits' A.D. | TV film |
| 2009 | The Time Traveler's Wife | Voice Over | |

==== Television ====
| Year | Title | Role | Notes |
|---|---|---|---|
| 1987 | One Big Family | Walter | Episode: "Kate's Dates" |
| 1987 | Once a Hero | Cubby Watson | Episode: "Once a Hero" |
| 1987 | Our House | Bobby Dalton | Episode: "Like Father, Like Son" |
| 1987 | Punky Brewster | Boy | Episode: "Open Door, Broken Heart: Part 2" |
| 1987 | It's a Living | Gregory | Episode: "Strictly Personal" |
| 1988 | The Golden Girls | McCraken | Episode: "Blanche's Little Girl" |
| 1988–1989 | TV 101 | Ralph | 4 episodes |
| 1989 | Newhart | Timmy | Episode: "Shoe Business Is My Life" |
| 1989 | Quantum Leap | Cameron Wilson | Episode: "Camikazi Kid – June 6, 1961" |
| 1989 | Sister Kate | Guy in Theater | Episode: "Hilary's Date" |
| 1991–1992 | The Wonder Years | Wart | 4 episodes |
| 1992 | CBS Schoolbreak Special | Eric | Episode: "Two Teens and a Baby" |
| 1995 | Full House | Duane | 3 episodes |
| 1995–1996 | The Parent 'Hood | Ira Melman, Shell Shocked | 9 episodes |
| 1996 | Sonic Christmas Blast | Kids | TV Short |
| 1998 | Jessie | Tommy | Episode: "Boo! He's Gone" |
| 1999 | For Your Love | Pizza Guy | Episode: "The Golf War" |
| 2003 | The Mullets | Scott | Episode: "Smoke on the Water" |
| 2004 | ER | Beidermeier | Episode: "Twas the Night" |
| 2006 | Numbers | Tyler | Episode: "The Mole" |
| 2007 | Scrubs | Rabbit | Episode: "My Rabbit" |
| 2010 | The Mentalist | Alec Mosca | Episode: "18-5-4" |
| 2010 | Zeke and Luther | Skateboard Contestant Announcer | Episode: "Kojo BFF" |
| 2011 | The Protector | Brian Pierce | Episode: "Blood" |
| 2013 | Franklin & Bash | Drew Silas | Episode: "Freck" |
| 2015 | Review | Ray Dunkleman | Episode: "Murder, Magic 8 Ball, Procrastination" |
| 2016 | Workaholics | Shane | Episode: "Meth Head Actor" |
| 2016 | General Hospital | Ted | 2 episodes |
| 2016 | Rosewood | Angry Man | Episode: "Keratin & Kissyface" |
| 2016 | The Night Of | Rikers Latino Prisoner | Miniseries Episode: "A Dark Crate" |
| 2016 | The Real O'Neals | Tony, Gangbanger | 2 episodes |
| 2016–2020 | Fuller House | Duane | 2 episodes |
| 2017 | Pickle and Peanut | TX | Episode: "Chalk Graffiti; Birthday at Wayne's" |
| 2017 | Do You Want to See a Dead Body? | Bars & Stripes Singer #3 | Episode: "A Body and a Bust (with Horatio Sanz)" |
| 2019 | 9-1-1 | Ray | Episode: "The Searchers" |
| 2019 | NCIS | Army Sergeant Donald Ptorias | Episode: "Someone Else's Shoes" |

=== Voice-over ===
==== Film ====
| Year | Title | Role | Notes |
|---|---|---|---|
| 1985 | Rainbow Brite and the Star Stealer | Brian | |
| 1986 | My Little Pony: The Movie | Danny | |
| 1987 | Yogi's Great Escape | Leader Kid | TV film |
| 1988 | Scooby-Doo and the Ghoul School | Tug | TV film |
| 1991 | The Little Engine That Could | Chip, Stretch | Short film |
| 1995 | The Land Before Time III: The Time of the Great Giving | Nod | Direct-to-video |
| 1997 | Dog of Flanders | Adult George | English dub |
| 1998 | The Jungle Book: Mowgli's Story | Wolf 2 | Direct-to-video |
| 2006 | Teen Titans: Trouble in Tokyo | Robin, Japanese Boy | Television film |
| 2006 | Casper's Scare School | Scare Center Host, Pumpkinhead, Pool Guy, Brainiac, Hunchback, Punk Kid | Television film |
| 2006 | Tekkonkinkreet | Black, Kuro | English dub |
| 2008 | Bachelor Party 2: The Last Temptation | Voice Actor | Direct-to-video |
| 2008 | Immigrants: L.A. Dolce Vita | Frat Boy, Diseased Guy | English dub |
| 2008 | Batman: Gotham Knight | B-Devil | Direct-to-video |
| 2008 | Fly Me to the Moon | Butch | |
| 2010 | A Turtle's Tale: Sammy's Adventures | Jacko | |
| 2010 | Despicable Me | Carnival Ride Worker, additional voices | |
| 2010 | Scooby-Doo! Camp Scare | Luke | Direct-to-video |
| 2012 | ParaNorman | Deputy Dwayne, Rapper Guy | |
| 2013 | Legends of Oz: Dorothy's Return | Flying Monkey | |
| 2016 | Lego Scooby-Doo! Haunted Hollywood | Junior | Direct-to-video |
| 2016 | Lego DC Comics Super Heroes: Justice League – Gotham City Breakout | Damian Wayne | Direct-to-video |
| 2017 | Cars 3 | Race Cars | Uncredited |
| 2018 | Lego DC Comics Super Heroes: Aquaman – Rage of Atlantis | Damian Wayne | Direct-to-video |
| 2018 | Teen Titans Go! To the Movies | Robin | |
| 2018 | Ralph Breaks the Internet | DirtySocks537 | Uncredited |
| 2019 | Missing Link | New Worlder | |
| 2019 | Lego DC Batman: Family Matters | Damian Wayne | |
| 2019 | The Secret Life of Pets 2 | Molly's Dad, Car Dog, additional voices | Uncredited |
| 2019 | Teen Titans Go! vs. Teen Titans | Robin, OG Robin | Direct-to-video |
| 2020 | Dolittle | Army Ants | |
| 2021 | The SpongeBob Movie: Sponge on the Run | Additional voices | |
| 2021 | Teen Titans Go! See Space Jam | Robin | TV film |
| 2022 | Teen Titans Go! & DC Super Hero Girls: Mayhem in the Multiverse | Robin | Direct-to-video |
| 2022 | Paws of Fury: The Legend of Hank | Additional voices | |
| 2023 | The Super Mario Bros. Movie | Koopa General | |
| 2023 | Elemental | Additional voices | |
| 2024 | Thelma the Unicorn | Raccoon | |
| 2025 | Dog Man | 3D Guy | |
| 2025 | In Your Dreams | Sandling | |
| 2025 | Gabby's Dollhouse: The Movie | Chumsley Jr. | |

==== Television ====
| Year | Title | Role | Notes |
|---|---|---|---|
| 1979 | Scooby-Doo and Scrappy-Doo | Additional voices | |
| 1982–1983 | The Little Rascals | Spanky | 33 episodes |
| 1983 | Deck the Halls with Wacky Walls | Darryl | Christmas Special |
| 1984 | The Get Along Gang | Bingo Beaver, Raccoon Gang member | 13 episodes |
| 1984–1986 | Rainbow Brite | Brian | 6 episodes |
| 1985 | Challenge of the GoBots | John | Episode: "Cy-Kill's Shrinking Ray" |
| 1986 | The Kingdom Chums: Little David's Adventure | Little David | TV Short |
| 1986 | Potato Head Kids | Spike | |
| 1986–1987 | The New Adventures of Jonny Quest | Jonny Quest | 13 episodes |
| 1986–1987 | My Little Pony 'n Friends | Danny | 3 episodes |
| 1986–1988 | The Flintstone Kids | Fred Flintstone | 15 episodes |
| 1987 | Amazing Stories | Billy Binford | Episode: "Family Dog" |
| 1987 | Sky Commanders | Additional voices | 2 episodes |
| 1987 | The Real Ghostbusters | Thaddeus Micawb | Episode: "Loathe Thy Neighbor" |
| 1988 | The Flintstone Kids' "Just Say No" Special | Freddy Flintstone, Clyde | TV Short |
| 1988–1991 | A Pup Named Scooby-Doo | Red Herring | 23 episodes |
| 1990 | Midnight Patrol: Adventures in the Dream Zone | Wonder Kid | 13 episodes |
| 1990 | New Kids on the Block | Joey McIntyre | 15 episodes |
| 1990–1991 | Fox's Peter Pan & the Pirates | Slightly, Aramis | 37 episodes |
| 1990–1996 | Captain Planet and the Planeteers | Ma-Ti | 113 episodes |
| 1991–1993 | Rugrats | Larry, Steve, Dr. Hoagie Dooser, Batboy, Bucky Majors | 8 episodes |
| 1992 | The Little Mermaid | Eel Boy | Episode: "Charmed" |
| 1992 | The Kingdom Chums: Original Top Ten | Osborn | Television special |
| 1993 | Adventures of Sonic the Hedgehog | Rocket the Sloth | Episode: "Slowwww Going" |
| 1993–1994 | 2 Stupid Dogs | Craig | 2 episodes |
| 1994 | Beethoven | Puff-Puff | 2 episodes |
| 1994 | Tekkaman Blade II | Hayato | 4 episodes; English dub |
| 1994–1999 | Where on Earth Is Carmen Sandiego? | Zack | 40 episodes |
| 1995 | Izzy's Quest for Olympic Gold | Martin | Television film |
| 1995 | Freakazoid! | Joey, Toby Danger | 2 episodes |
| 1995 | Dumb and Dumber | Chippy, Elf, Little Boy | Episode: "Santa Klutz" |
| 1998 | Cow and Chicken | Clerk | Episode: "101 Uses for Cow and Chicken" |
| 1998 | Superman: The Animated Series | Trouble, Kenny Braverman | 2 episodes |
| 1998 | Initial D | Goro, Shoichi | English dub; 26 episodes |
| 1999 | The Powerpuff Girls | Jimmy, Crook #1, Hanout, Crook #1, Teddy | 2 episodes |
| 1999–2000 | The Brothers Flub | Fraz Flub | 26 episodes |
| 1999–2002 | Mission Hill | Kevin French, C-Dog | 13 episodes |
| 2001 | The Wild Thornberrys | Castorsky | Episode: "All Work and No Play" |
| 2003 | Ninja Scroll: The Series | Tsubute | English dub; 9 episodes |
| 2003 | Rocket Power | Dude #1, Spectator | Episode: "Reggie's Big (Beach) Break" |
| 2003 | Totally Spies! | T-Bone | Episode: "Boy Bands Will Be Boy Bands" |
| 2003 | Justice League | King | Episode: "Wild Cards" |
| 2003–2006 | Teen Titans | Robin, Red X | Main role |
| 2003–2006 | The Grim Adventures of Billy & Mandy | Hades, Couple, Pinocchio, Rick Courage | 4 episodes |
| 2004 | Evil Con Carne | Cabana Boy, Goon #2, Goat | 2 episodes |
| 2005 | Zatch Bell! | Eshros | English dub; episode: "The Elite Mamodo" |
| 2005 | American Dad! | Timmy, Kids | Episode: "A Smith in the Hand" |
| 2005 | All Grown Up! | Amish Boy, Plastic Soccer Player | 2 episodes |
| 2005, 2008 | Avatar: The Last Airbender | Gan Jin Scout, Actor Sokka | 2 episodes |
| 2006 | Super Robot Monkey Team Hyperforce Go! | Prometheus Five "Slingshot" | Episode: "Prototype" |
| 2006 | Celebrity Deathmatch | Bam Margera | Episode: "New Celebrity Deathmatch: Bigger & Better Then Ever" |
| 2006 | Codename: Kids Next Door | Indian KND Operative, Bobby, Numbah 85/Paddy Fullbright | 2 episodes |
| 2006 | Shorty McShorts' Shorts | Donny, Donnie, Brian Reacrest | 4 episodes |
| 2006–2008 | Shaggy & Scooby-Doo Get a Clue! | Shaggy Rogers, Dr. Trebla, Agents, Sparky | Main role |
| 2007 | My Life as a Teenage Robot | Travis, Boy #1, Boy #3 | 2 episodes |
| 2008 | The Land Before Time | Nod, Sharptooth Mom | Episode: "The Great Egg Adventure" |
| 2008 | Ben 10: Alien Force | J.T. | Episode: "The Gauntlet" |
| 2008–2009 | The Secret Saturdays | Francis, Agent 2 | 3 episodes |
| 2009–2010 | Batman: The Brave and the Bold | Metamorpho | 4 episodes |
| 2009–2011 | Poppets Town | Blooter | 26 episodes |
| 2010–2011 | The Super Hero Squad Show | Quicksilver | 2 episodes |
| 2010–2011 | Ben 10: Ultimate Alien | Jimmy Jones, J.T. | 5 episodes |
| 2010, 2012 | The Avengers: Earth's Mightiest Heroes | Young Bucky Barnes | 2 episodes |
| 2011 | G.I. Joe: Renegades | Vincent Hauser | Episode: "Homecoming" |
| 2011 | Scooby-Doo! Mystery Incorporated | Ricky Owens | 2 episodes |
| 2011–2012 | New Teen Titans | Robin, Red X | 13 episodes |
| 2012 | Gravity Falls | Nate, Flavor Pup #2 | Episode: "The Inconveniencing" |
| 2012–2015 | Randy Cunningham: 9th Grade Ninja | Bucky Hensletter | 37 episodes |
| 2012–2017 | Teenage Mutant Ninja Turtles | Crankshaw, Dr. Blip, Crankshaw Jr., various voices | 27 episodes |
| 2013–2014 | Ben 10: Omniverse | Chrono Spanner, Jimmy Jones, Ken Tennyson | 5 episodes |
| 2013–present | Teen Titans Go! | Robin, Birdarang, Speedy, Killer Moth, Detective Chimp, Brain, Donatello, Billy Numerous, Roy Harper, Easter Bunny, Mister Mind, Kilowog, Himself, additional voices | Main role |
| 2014 | Angry Little Asian Girl | Bruce, Pat, Principal Trillo, Pippy the Pony | |
| 2014–2015 | Uncle Grandpa | Laundry Dude, Riley | 3 episodes |
| 2014–2016 | The 7D | Sneezy, Nabble | 43 episodes |
| 2015 | We Bare Bears | Delivery Guy | Episode: "Jean Jacket" |
| 2015–2017 | Star vs. the Forces of Evil | Manfred, Zeke | 5 episodes |
| 2016 | Second Chance | Arthur | 11 episodes |
| 2017–2018 | Bunnicula | Scott Dingleman, Robot T-Rex, Little Fly, Gordon | |
| 2017 | Be Cool, Scooby-Doo! | Mr. Junior | Episode: "Protein Titans 2" |
| 2017–2018 | Stretch Armstrong and the Flex Fighters | Jake Armstrong/Stretch, additional voices | Main role |
| 2017–2020 | Spider-Man | Dr. Otto Octavius / Doctor Octopus / Living Brain, Grady Scraps, various voices | Recurring role |
| 2018 | Rise of the Teenage Mutant Ninja Turtles | Dale | Episode: "Hypno! Part Deux!" |
| 2018–2019 | Big City Greens | Jace | 2 episodes |
| 2019 | Young Justice | Mento, Chief | Episode: "Nightmare Monkeys" |
| 2019 | Amphibia | Quentin | Episode: "Croak and Punishment" |
| 2020 | Infinity Train | Troy, Bully #1 | Episode: "The Toad Car" |
| 2021 | Scooby-Doo and Guess Who? | Store Manager, Bank Detective, Green Man Monster | Episode: "Returning of the Key Ring!" |
| 2022 | Family Guy | Car Wash Guy | Episode: "Hard Boiled Meg" |
| 2022 | Cars on the Road | Additional voices | 2 episodes |
| 2022 | Monster High | Romulus | |
| 2025 | Win or Lose | Random Dave | Episode: "Home" |

==== Video games ====
| Year | Title | Role | Notes | Source |
|---|---|---|---|---|
| 1992 | INXS: Make My Video | Ted | | |
| 1995 | Panic in the Park | Vendor #2 | | |
| 1998 | Rugrats: Search for Reptar | Larry, Steve | Uncredited | |
| 2000 | Alundra 2 | Albert, Messenger B, Pirate E | | |
| 2002 | The Lord of the Rings: The Fellowship of the Ring | Sam Gamgee | | |
| 2003 | Final Fantasy X-2 | Yaibal | English dub | |
| 2003 | Batman: Rise of Sin Tzu | Tim Drake | | |
| 2004 | Tales of Symphonia | Lloyd Irving | English dub | |
| 2004 | Metal Gear Solid: The Twin Snakes | Genome Soldiers | English dub | |
| 2004 | Xenosaga Episode II: Jenseits von Gut und Böse | Young Albedo | English dub | |
| 2004 | Call of Duty: United Offensive | Pvt. Whitney, Pvt. Semashko | | |
| 2004 | Metal Gear Solid 3: Subsistence | Soldiers | English dub | |
| 2004 | Metal Gear Solid 3: Snake Eater | Soldier | English dub | |
| 2005 | Shadow of Rome | Octavianus | | |
| 2005 | Star Wars: Episode III – Revenge of the Sith | Jedi Padawan | | |
| 2005 | The Suffering: Ties That Bind | Kyle | | |
| 2005 | Teen Titans | Robin, Red X | | |
| 2005 | Call of Duty 2: Big Red One | Pfc. Allen | | |
| 2005 | Zatch Bell! Mamodo Fury | Eshros | English dub | |
| 2006 | Reservoir Dogs | Mr. Orange | | |
| 2006 | Final Fantasy XII | Additional voices | English dub | |
| 2007 | MySims | Sim | | |
| 2008 | Valkyria Chronicles | Johann Oswald Eisen – EX Mission only | English dub | |
| 2008 | MySims Kingdom | Sim | | |
| 2009 | Eat Lead: The Return of Matt Hazard | Downey, Commando, Zombie | | |
| 2009 | MySims Agents | Sim | | |
| 2009 | Final Fantasy XIII | Cocoon Inhabitants | English dub | |
| 2010 | Resonance of Fate | Zephyr | English dub | |
| 2010 | StarCraft II: Wings of Liberty | Egon Stetmann | | |
| 2010 | MySims SkyHeroes | Sim | | |
| 2010 | Ben 10 Ultimate Alien: Cosmic Destruction | Jimmy Jones | | |
| 2010 | Marvel Super Hero Squad: The Infinity Gauntlet | Quicksilver | | |
| 2012 | Kinect Star Wars | Padawan 2 | | |
| 2012 | Call of Duty: Black Ops II | Marlton Johnson | | |
| 2014 | Sunset Overdrive | Chandler, Game Shame Announcer, Larry The Leper, Farmer Fong | | |
| 2015 | Lego Dimensions | Robin, Ticket Officer | | |
| 2016 | StarCraft II: Nova Covert Ops | Egon Stetmann | | |
| 2016 | Teeny Titans | Robin | | |
| 2018 | World of Warcraft: Battle for Azeroth | Vulpera Male, Prince Erazmin | | |
| 2019 | Call of Duty: Black Ops 4 | Marlton Johnson | | |
| 2021 | The Artful Escape | Hyperion Party Animal, Alien, Softserve Child | | |
| 2026 | God of War Sons of Sparta | Deimos (young) | | |

== Discography ==
Boy Hits Car

- My Animal (1998) (NMG Records)
- Boy Hits Car (2001) (Wind-Up Records)
- The Passage (independently released in 2005, then re-released in 2006 through Rock Ridge Music)

== Awards and nominations ==
| Year | Award | Work | Category | Result |
|---|---|---|---|---|
| 1988 | Young Artist Awards | Potato Head Kids | Outstanding Young Actor/Actress/Ensemble in Animation Voice-Over | Nominated |
| 1988 | Young Artist Awards | The New Adventures of Jonny Quest | Outstanding Young Actor/Actress/Ensemble in Animation Voice-Over | Nominated |
| 2014 | Behind the Voice Actor Awards | Teenage Mutant Ninja Turtles | Best Vocal Ensemble in a Television Series - Action/Drama | Nominated |
| 2014 | Behind the Voice Actor Awards | Teen Titans Go! | Best Vocal Ensemble in a New Television Series | Won |
| 2015 | Behind the Voice Actor Awards | The 7D | Best Vocal Ensemble in a New Television Series | Won |
| 2016 | Behind the Voice Actor Awards | The 7D | Best Vocal Ensemble in a Television Series | Won |
| 2016 | Behind the Voice Actor Awards | Lego Dimensions | Best Vocal Ensemble in a Video Game | Won |

| Preceded by Casey Kasem | Voice of Norville "Shaggy" Rogers; 2006–2008 | Succeeded by Matthew Lillard |
