= New Kids on the Block (TV series) =

American animated television series

- Genre: Animation
- Developed by: Kayte Kuch; Sheryl Scarborough
- Directed by: Mario Piluso
- Voices of: David Coburn; Brian Stokes Mitchell; Loren Lester; Scott Menville; Matt E. Mixer; Dave Fennoy; Pat Fraley; J. D. Hall; Josh Keaton; Theresa Saldana
- Composers: Murray McFadden; Timothy Mullhollan
- Country of origin: United States
- Original language: English
- No. of seasons: 1
- No. of episodes: 15

Production
- Executive producers: Andy Heyward; Robby London; Dick Scott
- Producer: Mario Piluso
- Running time: 22 minutes
- Production companies: DIC Animation City; Big Step Productions

Original release
- Network: ABC
- Release: September 8 – December 14, 1990

New Kids on the Block is an animated series featuring the adventures of the vocal group of the same name. It lasted for one season in 1990 on ABC. Beginning the following year, it aired in reruns from October 12, 1991, to 1993 on Disney Channel. Though the group appeared in live action clips, their animated voices were performed by other voice actors. "You Got It (The Right Stuff)" was the opening theme, while an instrumental version of "Step by Step" was the closing theme. In each episode, the group is traveling to a concert location when something takes them off track, ending in a pro-social moral lesson. A primetime special, New Kids on the Block Christmas Special, aired on ABC on December 14, 1990.

== Plot ==
The series follows the group's misadventures on tour, which often threaten to make them late for a concert and cause trouble for their management team. Their real-life manager Dick Scott and group founder Maurice Starr appear as characters, along with Steve "Biscuit" Walker, another of their managers, reworked as the group's bodyguard, and their on-road tutor Albert "Einstein".

== Voice cast ==
- David Coburn - Donnie Wahlberg/Nikko the dog
- Brian Stokes Mitchell - Danny Wood
- Loren Lester - Jordan Knight
- Scott Menville - Joey McIntyre
- Matt E. Mixer - Jonathan Knight
- Dave Fennoy - Dick Scott
- Dorian Harewood - Maurice Starr
- Pat Fraley - Hubbie
- J. D. Hall - Steve "Biscuit" Walker
- Josh Keaton - Albert "Einstein"
- Theresa Saldana - Rosa

=== Additional voices ===
- Patricia Alice Albrecht
- Bobby Block
- Susan Blu
- Thom Bray
- Hamilton Camp
- Jennifer Darling
- Linda Gary
- Gaille Heidemann - Reporter
- Michael Horse
- Clyde Kusatsu
- Sherry Lynn
- Kenneth Mars
- Pat Musick
- Samantha Paris
- Rob Paulsen
- Maggie Roswell
- Leslie Speights
- Cree Summer - Stevie
- Susan Ware
- Michael Winslow

== Crew ==
- Susan Blu - voice director

== Episodes ==
| No. | Title | Written by | Original release date |
|---|---|---|---|
| 1 | "The New Kid in the Class" | Mark McCorkle & Robert Schooley | September 8, 1990 |
| 2 | "Sheik of My Dreams" | Sheryl Scarborough & Kayte Kuch | September 15, 1990 |
| 3 | "In Step... Out of Time!" | Charles M. Howell | September 22, 1990 |
| 4 | "Cowa-BONK-a" | Mark McCorkle & Robert Schooley | September 29, 1990 |
| 5 | "Kissed Missed 'n Double Dis't" | Gordon Bressack | October 6, 1990 |
| 6 | "Dis't Dream Date" | Mark McCorkle & Robert Schooley, Kayte Kuch & Sheryl Scarborough | October 13, 1990 |
| 7 | "Hot Dog!" | Mark McCorkle & Robert Schooley | October 20, 1990 |
| 8 | "Overnight Success" | Story by : Janis Diamond; Teleplay by : Gordon Bressack | October 27, 1990 |
| 9 | "The Legend of the Sandman" | Mark McCorkle & Robert Schooley | November 3, 1990 |
| 10 | "Homeboys on the Range" | Story by : Mark McCorkle & Robert Schooley; Teleplay by : Chris Weber & Karen Willson | November 10, 1990 |
| 11 | "New Heroes on the Block" | Bruce A. Faulk | November 17, 1990 |
| 12 | "The New Kids on the Old Block" | Charles M. Howell | November 24, 1990 |
| 13 | "The New Kids Off the Wall" | Phil Harnage, Kevin O'Donnell, Mario Piluso | December 1, 1990 |
| 14 | "Rewind Time" | Charles M. Howell | December 8, 1990 |
| 15 | "Christmas Special" | Kayte Kuch & Sheryl Scarborough, Mark McCorkle & Robert Schooley | December 14, 1990 |

== VHS releases ==
| Year | Title | Production details | Notes | Certifications |
|---|---|---|---|---|
| 1990 | The New Kid in the Class | Released: November 6, 1990; Label: Sony Music; Format: VHS | Includes "The New Kid In The Class" episode. | RIAA: 2× Platinum |
| 1990 | Sheik of My Dreams | Released: November 6, 1990; Label: Sony Music; Format: VHS | Includes the "Sheik of My Dreams" episode. | RIAA: 2× Platinum |
| 1990 | In Step...Out of Time | Released: November 6, 1990; Label: Sony Music; Format: VHS | Includes the "In Step...Out of Time" episode. | RIAA: 2× Platinum |
| 1990 | Kissed, Missed'n Double D'ist | Released: 1990; Label: Sony Music; Format: VHS | Includes the "Kissed, Missed'n Double D'ist" episode. | |
| 1990 | Overnight Success | Released: 1990; Label: Sony Music; Format: VHS | Includes the "Overnight Success" episode. | |
| 1990 | New Heroes on the Block | Released: 1990; Label: Sony Music; Format: VHS | Includes the "New Heroes on the Block" episode. | |
