= Juris Upatnieks =

American-Latvian physicist and inventor (1936–2026)

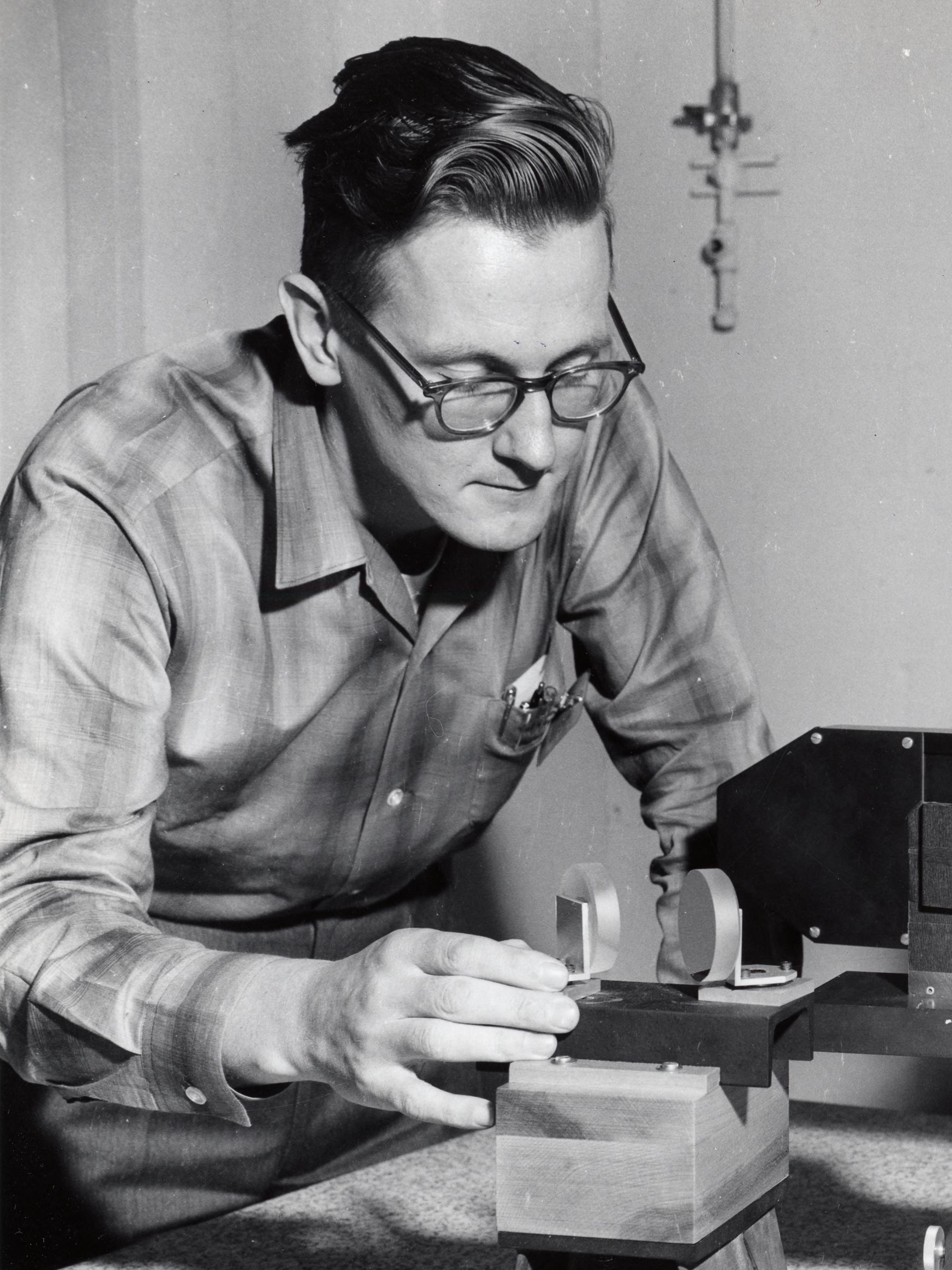
- Born: May 7, 1936; Riga, Latvia
- Died: May 17, 2026 (aged 90)
- Education: University of Akron; University of Michigan
- Known for: Co-inventor of holography
- Awards: R. W. Wood Prize (1975)
- Scientific career
- Workplaces: University of Michigan

Juris Upatnieks (May 7, 1936 – May 17, 2026) was a Latvian-American physicist and inventor, and pioneer in the field of holography. He was nominated for the 1969 Nobel Prize in Physics alongside Emmett Leith but did not win.

== Life and career ==
Upatnieks fled Latvia with his parents at the close of World War II, seeking asylum in Germany. In 1951 the family emigrated to the United States. He attended high school in Akron, Ohio, and studied electrical engineering at the University of Akron, where he was awarded a bachelor's degree in 1960. Thereafter he studied at the Institute of Science and Technology of the University of Michigan, where he earned a master's degree in electrical engineering in 1965. From 1973 to 1993 he worked at the Environmental Research Institute of Michigan and was an adjunct professor, Electrical and Computer Engineering Department at University of Michigan in Ann Arbor. There he taught a laboratory course in optics until 1996. From 1993 to 2001 he was a consultant with Applied Optics in Ann Arbor. From 1996 to 2001 he was also a researcher with the faculty of Mechanical Engineering and Applied Mechanics at the University of Michigan.

In 1964 he demonstrated, with Emmett Leith, the first three-dimensional holograms in the United States and together with Leith published a series of technical papers from 1962 to 1964.

As of 2009 Upatnieks held 19 patents. Among them is a holographic gunsight.

In 1975 he received the R. W. Wood Prize of the Optical Society of America and 1976 the Holley Medal of the American Society of Mechanical Engineers. He was named "Inventor of the Year" in 1976 by the American Association for the Advancement of Invention and Innovation. He was a member of the Optical Society (Fellow) and of International Society for Optical Engineering, as well as a member of the Latvian Academy of Sciences, whose Great Medal he received in 1999. In 2010, he received the Emmett N. Leith Medal.

Upatnieks died on May 17, 2026, at the age of 90.

== Patents ==
Upatnieks was holder or co-holder of 20 United States Patents in the fields of holography and coherent radiation.

Patent number	Subject	Year granted
U.S. patent 3,506,327	Wavefront Reconstruction Using a Coherent Reference Beam	1970
U.S. patent 3,532,407	Spatial Frequency Reduction in Holography	1970
U.S. patent 3,539,241	Method of Imaging Transparent Objects with Coherent Light	1970
U.S. patent 3,545,835	Two-Beam Holography with Reduced Source Coherence Requirements	1970
U.S. patent 3,548,643	Holographic Vibration Analysis Method and Apparatus	1970
U.S. patent 3,580,655	Wavefront Reconstruction	1971
U.S. patent 3,637,313	Method of Imaging Transparent Objects with Coherent Light	1972
U.S. patent 3,677,617	Technique of Holographic Data Reduction Utilizing an Additional Diffusing Structure During Reconstruction	1972
U.S. patent 3,748,048	Method of Detecting Changes in Specular Surface	1973
U.S. patent 3,838,903	Wavefront Reconstruction	1974
U.S. patent 3,894,787	Holograms	1975
U.S. patent 4,012,150	Holographic Light Line Sight	1977
U.S. patent 4,057,317	Hologram Projector	1977
U.S. patent 4,223,975	Aberration Correction of Magnified Holographic Images	1980
U.S. patent 4,277,137	Coherent Optical Correlator	1981
U.S. patent 4,643,515	Method and Apparatus for Recording and Displaying Edge-Illuminated Holograms	1987
U.S. patent 4,711,512	Compact Head-Up Display	1987
U.S. patent 5,151,800	Compact Hologram Displays and Methods of Making Compact Hologram	1992
U.S. patent 5,483,362	Compact Holographic Sight	1996
U.S. patent 6,674,521	Optical Method and System for Rapidly Measuring Relative Angular Alignment of Flat Parts	2004

== See also ==
- List of nominees for the Nobel Prize in Physics
