= Boy Hits Car =

American rock band

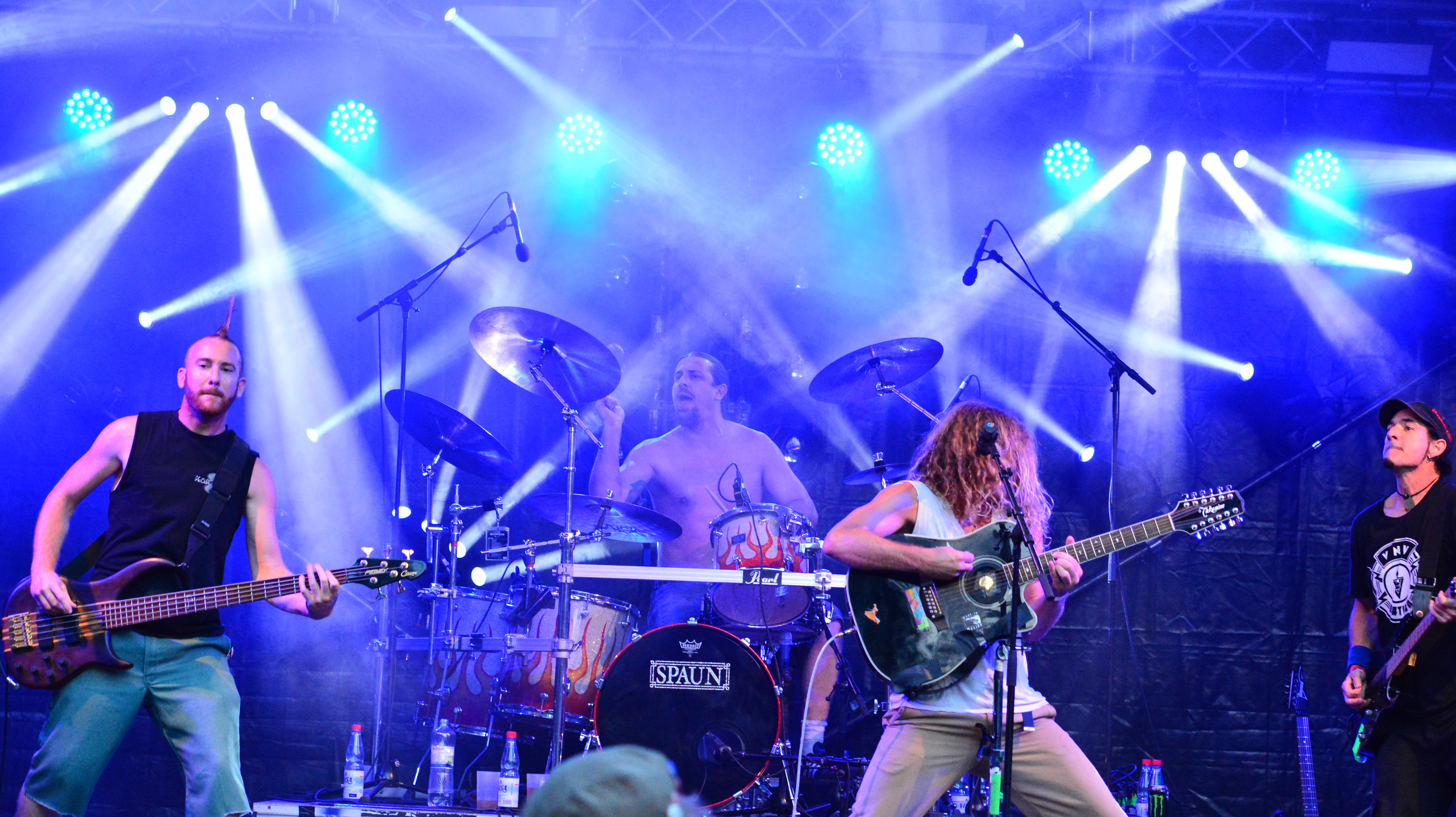
- Boy Hits Car live at the Langeln Open Air, Germany, 2014

Background information
- Origin: Los Angeles, California, U.S.
- Genres: Alternative metal, alternative rock, nu metal
- Years active: 1993–present
- Labels: NMG, Wind-up, Rock Ridge
- Members: Cregg Rondell; Bill Gower; Mike Bartak; Erik Peterson
- Past members: Louis Lenard; Scott Menville; Michael Ferrari; Dusty Hunt; Johnny Ransom Will "Walrus" Jenkins

Boy Hits Car is an American alternative rock/metal band from Los Angeles, formed in 1993.

== History ==
The band was formed in 1993. After releasing their first album, My Animal, independently in 1998, they went on the Sno-Core Tour and recorded their next album, Boy Hits Car, on Wind-up Records. Their song "LoveFuryPassionEnergy" was used as a theme song for WWE Hall of Famer Lita and was distributed on the WWF Forceable Entry album in 2002. A third album was self released in 2005 called The Passage. In 2006 the band re-released the album in July after signing with Rock Ridge Music as their distributor. A fourth record, Stealing Fire, was released on March 15, 2011. Boy Hits Car released their 5th studio album All That Led Us Here in May 2014 and followed it up with a European tour. A live album titled Worldwide Alive was later released on September 11th 2020.

Peterson stated in a Reddit AMA conducted to mark the self-titled album's 20th anniversary that 12 to 13 tracks had been written for a pending sixth album, with a name for said album still being decided upon at that time. The lead single, Injustice Fatigue, was released in November 2022. Four more singles, "Love Wanted (Inquire Within)," "Mind Elevation," "Be Here Now," and "Face The Dawn," were released in February, May, December 2025, and January 2026, respectively. Their 6th Record, Waves of Sound Across Oceans of Time, was eventually released digitally; January 16th 2026.

A May 2025 live performance band was cancelled after a vehicle collided with the Whisky A Go Go venue; the band have acknowledged the irony of this event with relation to the band's name.

== Musical style and influences ==
Boy Hits Car was started in 1993 with a simple idea—to write and perform 'passionately heavy music' infused with a world beat/middle eastern flavor. The band cite their influences as Jane's Addiction, Primus, Bad Religion, Talking Heads, Quicksand, Led Zeppelin and Helmet, as well as eastern music such as Ali Akbar Khan.

== Members ==
=== Current ===
- Cregg Rondell – vocals, twelve-string guitar (1993–present)
- Bill Gower – bass guitar (2006–present)
- Mike Bartak – guitar (2007–present)
- Erik Peterson – drums (2014–present)

=== Former ===
- Louis Lenard – guitar – (1993–2006)
- Scott Menville – bass guitar (1993–2006)
- Michael Ferrari – drums (1993–2003)
- Johnny Ransom – drums (2004–2012)
- Dusty Hunt – guitar (2005–2007)
- Will Jenkins – drums (2012–2013)

== Discography ==
=== Studio albums ===
- My Animal (1998) (NMG Records)
- Boy Hits Car (2001) (Wind-Up Records)
- The Passage (independently released in 2005, then re-released in 2006 through Rock Ridge Music)
- Stealing Fire (2011) (March 15, 2011)
- All That Led Us Here (2014)
- Waves of Sound Across Oceans of Time (January 16, 2026)

=== Live albums ===
- Worldwide Alive (2020)
