= The Passage (Boy Hits Car album) =

Studio album by Boy Hits Car
- Released: 2005
- Genre: Emo; nu metal; alternative rock
- Length: 57:10
- Label: Rock Ridge Music

Boy Hits Car chronology
Boy Hits Car (2001)	The Passage (2005)	Stealing Fire (2011)

The Passage is the third studio album by American alternative rock band Boy Hits Car, released independently in 2005. The album was re-released in the United States under Rock Ridge Music on July 11, 2006, and was re-released a second time for international audiences under Golf Records in 2007.

== Composition ==
The Passage has been described as an emo and nu metal record, and has been compared to material by Jack Johnson and Linkin Park.

== Reception ==
A neutral to positive 6.5/10 review came from Rock Freaks, praising the first half of the album while being comparatively less enthusiastic about the latter half. powermetal.de gave the album a less positive review, stating that most tracks do not stand out from each other although being more positive of the melodic elements presented. Burn Your Ears rated the album 5.5 out of 10, but gave it a largely positive review.

== Track listing ==
No.	Title	Length
1.	"As the Day Fades"	1:48
2.	"Tonight"	4:27
3.	"Escape the World"	3:17
4.	"Sound of a Breaking Heart"	3:17
5.	"These Burning Memories"	5:05
6.	"Windswept"	4:19
7.	"Love's Subtle Scheme"	3:44
8.	"Forever and a Day"	3:36
9.	"Everything"	3:32
10.	"You Don't Care"	3:30
11.	"Beneath the Sea's Bed"	5:14
12.	"This Song for You"	4:21
13.	"All the Love We Hold Inside"	3:34
14.	"The Passage"	7:26
Total length:		57:10
