= Stealing Fire (Boy Hits Car album) =

Studio album by Boy Hits Car
- Released: 5 March 2011
- Recorded: November 2008 – June 2010
- Studio: The Emergency Room Studios (Los Angeles, California)
- Genre: Nu metal
- Label: Rock Ridge Music

Boy Hits Car chronology
The Passage (2005)	Stealing Fire (2011)	All That Led Us Here (2014)

Stealing Fire is the fourth studio album by American alternative rock band Boy Hits Car. First released on CD in March 2011, it became available for streaming on December 24, 2021.

== Background ==
The album was recorded in a period of time from November 2008 through June 2010, while the band was also touring. Four months of this interval were spent working on the album in three "segments".

== Reception ==
A Geekscape review gave the album two and a half stars out of five, highlighting and praising several standout tracks, but considering the rest of the album "listenable" at best.

The title track has seen comparisons drawn between the band and other bands such as Thumb, Deftones and Rage Against the Machine.

== Track listing ==
No.	Title	Length
1.	"Intro (lfpe)"	1:23
2.	"Move with Me"	3:28
3.	"A Madness Called Love"	3:51
4.	"One Kiss Away"	4:28
5.	"Stealing Fire from the Sun"	3:44
6.	"Embrace (For It's Myself I Need Strength Against)"	3:16
7.	"Dreams (Of Foreign Metabolic Circumstance)"	3:37
8.	"Eager Tempos"	3:54
9.	"It's Alright"	4:19
10.	"Erifsievol"	3:56
11.	"Metaphwhore"	3:18
12.	"Eagle & The Hawk (and Da Gull)" (John Denver cover)	5:17
13.	"She Ran Away"	4:15
14.	"Rhythmical Gestures"	15:17
