= Patricia Alice Albrecht =

American actress (1953–2019)

- Born: January 30, 1953; Detroit, Michigan, U.S.
- Died: December 25, 2019 (aged 66); Nashville, Tennessee, U.S.
- Education: Wayne State University (BFA)
- Occupations: Actress; writer; poet

Patricia Alice Albrecht (January 30, 1953 – December 25, 2019) was an American actress, writer and poet. She was best known for her role as Phyllis "Pizzazz" Gabor, the antagonistic lead singer of the fictional band The Misfits in the animated television series Jem from 1985 to 1988. Her other voiceover work included the animated series The New Yogi Bear Show, The Snorks, and New Kids on the Block.

Albrecht was born in Detroit, Michigan and earned a Bachelor of Fine Arts in theater from Wayne State University. She appeared in a series of live action films and television series throughout the 1970s and early 1980s before transitioning to voiceover roles. Her notable live action credits included guest roles in Remington Steele and the 1980 comedic film, Midnight Madness.

In 1985, Albrecht was cast as Pizzazz in the animated series, Jem, which aired from 1985 to 1988. Her character was the lead vocalist in the fictional band, The Misfits, who were the rivals of the lead characters, Jem and the Holograms. She went on to voice a number of characters in animated films and series throughout the 1980s and 1990s, including The New Yogi Bear Show, The Snorks, New Kids on the Block, Droopy: Master Detective, Batman: The Animated Series, and The Sylvester & Tweety Mysteries.

Albrecht later moved to Nashville to pursue creative writing and poetry. Her works, much of which focused on fiction, included Wind Eyes, A Woman's Reader and Writing Source, The Crone Chronicles, National Library of Poetry. She also founded a Nashville-based writers group. Albrecht also released an audio CD of poetry called A Touch of Pizzazz in 2009 for fans of her 1980s series, Jem.

Patricia Alice Albrecht died at her home in Nashville, Tennessee, on December 25, 2019, aged 66, from undisclosed causes. Her fellow Jem cast member and good friend, Samantha Newark, was present when Albrecht died.
