= Jem (TV series) =

American animated television series (1985–1988)

- Title character and logo from opening sequence
- Genre: Romance; Science fiction; Musical
- Created by: Christy Marx
- Developed by: Roger Slifer (seasons 1–3); Christy Marx (seasons 2–3)
- Directed by: Ray Lee
- Voices of: Samantha Newark; Britta Phillips; Patricia Alice Albrecht; Kath Soucie; Marlene Aragon; Susan Blu; Neil Ross; Charlie Adler; Desirée Goyette; Cathy Cavadini; Hazel Shermet
- Theme music composer: Ford Kinder; Anne Bryant
- Composer: Robert J. Walsh
- Country of origin: United States
- Original language: English
- No. of seasons: 3
- No. of episodes: 65 (list of episodes)

Production
- Executive producers: Joe Bacal; Jay Bacal; Tom Griffin; Margaret Loesch
- Running time: 23 minutes
- Production companies: Hasbro; Sunbow Productions; Marvel Productions

Original release
- Network: First-run syndication
- Release: November 3, 1985 – May 2, 1988

Jem, also known as Jem and The Holograms, is an American animated musical television series that ran from 1985 to 1988. The series is about record company owner Jerrica Benton, her singer alter-ego Jem, and the adventures of her band Jem and The Holograms. The series was a joint collaboration by Hasbro, Sunbow Productions and Marvel Productions, the same team responsible for G.I. Joe and Transformers. The creator of the series, Christy Marx, had also been a staff writer for the aforementioned programs.

The animation for most of the episodes was provided by Japanese animation studio Toei Animation. Eleven episodes and the opening sequence were instead provided by the South Korean studio AKOM.

== Premise ==
=== Characters ===
Jem and her true identity Jerrica Benton

The series revolves around Jerrica Benton, the owner and manager of Starlight Music, and her alter-ego Jem, lead singer of the rock group Jem and The Holograms. Jerrica adopts the persona of Jem with the help of a holographic computer, known as Synergy, which was built by Jerrica's father and is bequeathed to her after his death.

Jem and The Holograms consists of Kimber Benton, Jerrica's younger sister, keyboardist, and main songwriter for the band; Aja Leith, Asian-American guitarist; Shana Elmsford, African-American, who plays the synth drums. Carmen "Raya" Alonso becomes the band's synth drummer after Shana briefly leaves the group to pursue a career in fashion. Upon her return to Jem and The Holograms, Shana becomes the band's bassist. Jem and The Holograms have two rival bands: The Misfits and The Stingers:

- The Misfits (no relation to the real-world band Misfits) consist of petulant rich girl Pizzazz and her group: no-nonsense guitarist Roxy and kind-hearted, sensitive keytar player Stormer. In the second season, they are joined by the manipulative British saxophonist Jetta.
- The Stingers debut in the third season when they cause disruptions for both groups by becoming co-owners of Stinger Sound with Eric Raymond. Originally from Germany, The Stingers are composed of egotistical lead singer Riot, guitarist/con artist Rapture, and keyboardist Minx.

=== Plot ===
Episodes of the series frequently revolve around Jerrica's efforts to keep her two identities separate, protect Synergy from those who might exploit the holographic technology, and support the twelve foster children known as the Starlight Girls who live with her and Jem and The Holograms. The Misfits frequently attempt to upstage Jem and the Holograms' endeavors, often nearly resulting in physical harm to members of the group. This rivalry is encouraged and manipulated by their manager and central villain in the series, Eric Raymond, the former half-owner of Starlight Music who runs Misfits Music (later Stinger Sound) while working under Pizzazz's father, Harvey Gabor.

During the series, Eric Raymond constantly plots to become owner of Starlight Music and get revenge on Jem and The Holograms for having cost him control of the company. Jerrica also deals with a complex and emotionally draining faux-love triangle involving her alter identity, Jem, and Rio Pacheco, Jerrica's longtime boyfriend. Rio romantically pursues both women, not knowing they are one and the same. Later in the series, Jem is also romantically sought after by Riot, who becomes infatuated with her – adding further complications to her relationships.

=== Music videos and songs ===
A music video featured in the show

A music video that deviates from the normal action in the show.

The series' format included three songs for the featured music videos in each episode. The theme song "Truly Outrageous" was the opening and closing theme for the show until late 1987, when "Jem Girls" became the series' opening theme for the majority of episodes and "Truly Outrageous" was kept as the show's permanent closing theme. Music videos featured an "in-your-face" style that was directed at the viewer or the more traditional style. The music videos paralleled the style of rock videos found on MTV at the time featuring fast editing, a quick pace, and special effects.

== Episodes ==
Season	Episodes	Originally released	
Season	Episodes	First released	Last released
1	26	November 3, 1985	March 15, 1987
2	27	September 21, 1987	January 12, 1988
3	12	February 8, 1988	May 2, 1988

== Production ==
=== Conception and staffing ===
Hasbro and an outside investor started developing Jem in response to an interest that children were showing in music videos. Hasbro hired advertising agency Griffin-Bacal Advertising, the founders of Sunbow Productions, to create the 65-episode animation series. Griffin-Bacal (Sunbow), as well as Marvel Productions, had previously created the successful G.I. Joe series for Hasbro. G.I. Joe writer Christy Marx was hired to create the series based on the line of dolls and the original concept, which consisted of the two girl bands, Synergy, the boyfriend Rio, and the Rockin' Roadster. Marx created the full character biographies and relationships, including the love triangle aspect between Rio and Jerrica Benton/Jem, Starlight Music and Starlight House, the Starlight Girls, the villain Eric Raymond and various secondary characters. Later, Marx was asked to develop new characters as they were introduced, with several of them named after pioneers in the history of holography.

=== Casting ===
Samantha Newark provided the speaking voices of Jem and Jerrica. Despite having toured as a child singer in various African countries, she did not do the singing for Jem. The voiceover cast never auditioned for the music side of the series and vice versa. The music for Jem was all cast and recorded in New York and Atlanta and the voiceover actors were cast and recorded in Burbank, California. They matched the speaking voices of the cast to the singing voices. Britta Phillips, who had never before worked professionally as a singer, was cast as the singing voice of Jem after obtaining an audition through her father who worked on jingles in New York. The initial take from the audition was used as the first opening theme song "Truly Outrageous". The remaining Holograms speaking voices were provided by Cathianne Blore (Kimber Benton/Aja Leith), Cindy McGee (Shana Elmsford), and Linda Dangcil (Carmen 'Raya' Alonso).

The Misfits' speaking voices were provided by Patricia Alice Albrecht (Phyllis "Pizzazz" Gabor), Samantha Paris/Bobbie Block (Roxanne "Roxy" Pellegrini), Susan Blu (Mary "Stormer" Phillips), and Louise Dorsey (Sheila "Jetta" Burns), daughter of Engelbert Humperdinck. Ellen Bernfeld provided the singing voice of Pizzazz. The Stingers' speaking voices were provided by Townsend Coleman (Rory "Riot" Llewelyn), Ellen Gerstell (Phoebe "Rapture" Ashe), and Kath Soucie (Ingrid "Minx" Kruger). Gordon Grody, a vocal coach who later worked with Lady Gaga, provided the singing voice for Riot.

Other notable cast members included Charlie Adler as Eric Raymond. He also provided the voices of both of Eric's major henchmen Zipper and Techrat. Vicki Sue Robinson, famous for the 1970s discothèque-oriented hit "Turn the Beat Around", provided the singing voices of both Rapture and Minx. Ari Gold, pop singer and songwriter, gave the singing voice of Ba Nee.

=== Music ===
Beat This by Jem and The Holograms (Britta Phillips)
30 second sample from the music video "Beat This" featured in "The Talent Search Part 2"

The inclusion of music videos in Jem was a result of the success and popularity of MTV (Music Television) at the time, which began airing four years prior. The show contains a total of 187 music videos with 151 unique songs. Over 200 original songs were written for the series. Several songs are featured on cassette tapes of Hasbro's Jem toy line. Sunbow Productions employed several musicians and songwriters. Ford Kinder and Anne Bryant composed the music, and Barry Hamon wrote the lyrics of the songs. Britta Phillips performed as Jem, Ellen Bernfeld performed as Pizzazz, and Gordon Grody, performed as Riot. Anne Bryant, who chose the singers and musicians, created a pop sound for Jem and The Holograms supported by acoustic instruments. The sound for The Misfits was crafted as strictly electronic other than the addition of guitars and an occasional sax solo when the character of Jetta was introduced into The Misfits. This was done to create an identifiable punk electronica style in stark contrast to their rival singing groups. In season three, Bryant introduced the slower funky groove for the third group that entered the show, The Stingers.

== Release ==
=== Marketing ===
According to Newsday in 1986, the budget for the first year of advertising the franchise totaled approximately $10 million— a large sum for a multifaced line at the time. Along with the series, Hasbro promoted Jem with a complete line of toys and accessories, hoping to create the "next fashion doll superstar in a market". Steven Eisenberg, a toy industry analyst at Bear Stearns, stated that the lineup would be "very successful" and "represent a potentially significant challenge to Barbie." Alfred C. Carosi Jr., former vice president of marketing services for Hasbro, also said, "Jem is getting as much push in terms of marketing muscle as any major line", explaining that the marketing services promoted several "Jem Coming Soon" advertisements. In a response to an analysis chart of toy sales, Paul Valentine, a toy analyst at Standard & Poor's Corporation, predicted the Jem toy line to be a flop. Hasbro's first Jem doll line was unveiled on February 10, 1986, at Hasbro's Madison Avenue showroom in New York City's North American International Toy Fair. The showroom was filled with Jem dolls and decorated with neon colors, "Miami Vice-styled" fashions, and video screens with animation clips and commercials.

In mid-1986, Nickelodeon partnered with Hasbro to sponsor a contest in which people were asked to call a toll-free telephone number and sing the theme song of the series. The grand prize was worth $7,000 and featured a trip to the MTV Video Music Awards in New York City. Other prizes included a 19-inch color television, a VCR and the Jem home video library, a dress identical to the one made for the Jem doll, and $1,000 cash. Carosi explained that the promotion "added proof of Jem's popularity", garnering more than 375,000 phone calls and breaking the telephone system once during the eight weeks of the contest. The contest winner was Keri King of Seymour, Indiana, who was chosen out of 325,000 children aged 12 and under.

=== Broadcast ===
Jem started airing 1985, in syndication. It consisted of one seven-minute short that aired every week as part of the Super Sunday lineup. On May 4, 1986, Jem started to air as a television series. Starting in September 1987, the series aired five times weekly. It has aired in multiple countries including Australia, Canada, United Kingdom, West Germany, Netherlands, United States, Italy and France. The series aired reruns on Hub Network / Discovery Family from May 31, 2011, to November 15, 2015. On July 25, 2011, Teletoon Retro, a Canadian channel dedicated to cartoons, announced that Jem would be part of its fall 2011 lineup. On April 5, 2012, Hasbro announced that Jem, along with several other Hasbro franchises, would be available on Netflix.

== Reception ==
Jem was the #1 Nielsen rated syndicated cartoon series in November 1986. In 1987, it was the third most watched children's program in syndication with 2.5 million viewers weekly. The show was nominated for the Young Artist Award twice, once in 1986 for "Exceptional Young Actresses in Animation: Series, Specials, or Film Features" for Samantha Newark's performance, then in 1988 for "Best Animation Series".

== Home media ==
Release name	Ep #	Company	Release date	Notes
Various VHS releases	25 (total)	Kid Rhino, Family Home Entertainment, Avid Entertainment (US)	1986–1987 (FHE, Avid) 1999 (Kid Rhino)	Various home video releases containing between two and five episodes.
Various VHS releases	20 (total)	Video Gems, Tempo Video (UK)	1986–1987 (Video Gems) 1987–1991 (Tempo Video, Tempo Kids Club)	Various home video releases containing between two and five episodes. Video Gems distributed the TV movie, Truly Outrageous.
Jem – The Complete First and Second Seasons; Jem – Season 3, Part One	45	Rhino Entertainment (US)	March 30, 2004; September 14, 2004	Contains all 26 original, uncut episodes of season one released as Jem and The Holograms – The Complete 1st & 2nd Seasons and the first 19 episodes of season 2 released as Jem and The Holograms: Season 3 – Part 1. Each DVD release is digitally remastered and fully restored and contains Dolby Digital 5.1 remastered audio along with the Dolby Digital 2.0.
Jem – Truly Outrageous: The Movie	5	Metrodome (UK)	October 2, 2006; June 4, 2007	Contains the first 5 episodes of the series in their TV movie format. This would include alternate and a few removed scenes from later broadcast versions of the first five episodes.
Jem et les Hologrammes – Edition VF – 4 DVD – Partie 1; Jem et les Hologrammes – Edition VF – 4 DVD – Partie 2; Jem et les Hologrammes – Edition VF – 4 DVD – Partie 3	64	Declic images (France)	January 15, 2010; January 15, 2010; April 30, 2010	The episodes are dubbed in French with the exception of the music videos. The set is missing the episode "Fathers' Day".
Jem and The Holograms: The Truly Outrageous Complete Series	65	Shout! Factory (US)	October 11, 2011 / September 29, 2015 (as a bare-bones re-issue edition with no bonus material)	The complete series on 11 DVDs with bonus material. Bonus material includes the documentary featurettes "Showtime, Synergy! The Truly Outrageous Creation of an '80s Icon", "Glamour & Glitter", and "Jem Girls (and Boys!) Remember", as well as original commercials, animatics, and rare DVD-ROM material. Walmart began offering an exclusive edition in simpler packaging with the series authored onto only eight discs on September 29, 2015. This edition contains only the series episodes with no bonus material content.
Jem and The Holograms: Season One	26	Shout! Factory (US)	October 11, 2011	All 26 episodes from season one.
Jem and The Holograms: Season Two	26	Shout! Factory (US)	February 14, 2012	26 episodes from season two, excluding "Britrock".
Jem and The Holograms: Season Three	13	Shout! Factory (US)	July 10, 2012	12 episodes from season three and "Britrock".
Jem and The Holograms: The Truly Outrageous Complete Series	65	Universal Pictures UK	February 15, 2016	All 65 episodes spread over 10 discs, a Region 2 PAL re-release of the US Shout! Factory release, though lacks the 11th bonus material disc.

== Franchise ==
Jem
- Created by: Christy Marx; Bill Sanders
- Original work: Toy line
- Owners: Hasbro; Integrity Toys (2012–2017, licensed); The Loyal Subjects (2025–present, licensed)

Print publications
- Comics: Jem and The Holograms; Jem and The Misfits; Jem and The Holograms: Infinite; Jem and The Holograms: Misfits Infinite

Films and television
- Film: Jem and the Holograms
- Animated series: Super Sunday segments Jem

Audio
- Original music: Truly Outrageous: A Tribute to Starlight Records; Jem and The Holograms (2025); Jem and the Holograms: Music is Magic

Christy Marx has long expressed a desire to make a modern-day revival of the animated series, but stated in a 2004 interview that there are a great deal of complications concerning the rights to the Jem properties.

I would like to see that happen. I don't want to go into a lot of detail, but the whole rights situation for Jem is very, very complicated. Believe me, if there were a simple straightforward way to do it, it would be done. But there are some very big complications that are in the way at the moment.

— Christy Marx

=== Dolls ===
Hasbro's first Jem toy line consisted of eight dolls, each packaged with a cassette tape, a few accessories and a poster, priced at $15 per doll. The cassettes contained the theme song "Truly Outrageous" and two other songs performed by Jem and The Holograms or The Misifts. The toy line also included the Jem Star Stage and Jem's Rockin' Roadster. As of June 1986, Jem's sales surpassed those of their competitor Barbie and the Rockers. By September 1987, more than three million dolls had been sold since the toy line was introduced. On September 8, 2011, Hasbro issued a press release announcing its attendance at the New York Comic Con from October 13–16, 2011, where it would be showing new and upcoming products at its booth, including those from Jem and The Holograms.

On June 27, 2012, Integrity Toys, Inc. announced their plans to release a new series of collectible fashion dolls based on the TV series. The special edition Hollywood Jem doll became available at the Hasbro Toy Shop booth during Comic-Con International in San Diego at an approximate retail price of $135. The Jem doll sold out on day two of the convention. On October 5, 2012, the four (then-upcoming) dolls in Integrity Toys' new limited edition collectible line were presented with pictures: Classic Jem, Jerrica Benton, Synergy and Rio Pacheco, with a suggested retail price of $119, to begin shipping in late November 2012. Pre-orders were accepted through Integrity Toys' network of authorized dealers. As of October 2016, Integrity Toys has produced more than 40 different dolls based on the TV show.

In September 2024, The Loyal Subjects inked a deal with Hasbro to relaunch a host of legacy brands, including Jem and the Holograms. In 2025, the company started a collection of dolls, beginning in February with the release of a 12-inch Jem doll. More characters joined the collection in the following months, including Aja, Kimber and Shana.

=== Comics ===
In 2011, Hasbro released a one-off comic book titled Unit:E as an exclusive at the New York Comic-Con; this was created by "HasLab" as a potential multi-brand crossover platform. The plot depicted Synergy, now an alien artificial intelligence, assisting the descendant of Acroyear and a Biotron from Micronauts in searching for heroes to help him combat Baron Karza. She shows them characters from G.I. Joe, Transformers, Battleship Galaxies, Stretch Armstrong, Action Man, M.A.S.K. and Candy Land among others. Jerrica herself is shown as not having taken up the Jem identity yet, but will eventually compose the "Music of the Spheres" (presumably with Synergy's aid). The comic was never followed up.

IDW released its Jem comic book in March 2015: written by Kelly Thompson, art by Sophie Campbell and colors by M. Victoria Robado. The comic book offered a modern re-imagining of the series with new character designs and different situations, such as Jem and The Holograms and The Misfits being unsigned bands at the start with Eric Raymond being hired as The Misfits' manager during the second story arc. In addition, Kimber and Stormer begin a romantic relationship. As of Issue #16, which is Campbell's final issue as regular artist, The Stingers have been introduced to the series with Raya featured as a fourth member of the band. The series ended on June 14, 2017, with issue #26, but a six-issue miniseries--Jem and The Holograms: Infinite #1 and Jem and The Holograms: Misfits Infinite #1 was released later in the month. A one-shot Jem and The Holograms: IDW 20/20 was published in January 2019 as part of IDW 20/20 which celebrated the 20th anniversary of IDW Publishing. The comic takes place 20 years after the final issue of the ongoing comic.

In October 2025, it was announced the comic license was transferred to Boom! Studios. A new ongoing Jem and the Holograms comic will be published in 2026. Boom Studios also launched a Kickstarter for a trade collection of the IDW Publishing comics in November 2025. In February 2026, it was revealed that Boom! Studios will be teaming with show creator Christy Marx on a limited series that will finally conclude the original show's storyline. The book is expected to debut later that year.

=== Film ===
After the success of G.I. Joe and Transformers films, Hasbro began considering a live-action film adaptation or a new incarnation of the animated series with Universal Pictures, with which Hasbro had signed a six-film contract in 2010. On March 20, 2014, a live-action motion picture adaptation of Jem and The Holograms was announced, to be directed by Jon M. Chu. Filming on the production began in April 2014. On April 24, it was announced that Aubrey Peeples had been cast as Jem, with Stefanie Scott as Kimber, Hayley Kiyoko as Aja and Aurora Perrineau as Shana. On April 30, 2014, actor Ryan Guzman was cast as Rio. On May 20, Juliette Lewis and Molly Ringwald joined the film. The film was theatrically released on October 23, 2015; it received generally negative reviews from critics and fans, with criticism targeted at the angsty teen drama, strayed too far from the source material as well as original series fan content being manipulated into reaction to the in-film characters. It was a box office bomb, grossing less than half its $5 million budget, and was removed from theaters by Universal after two weeks. SF Weekly criticized the fan backlash as entitlement.

=== Music ===
==== Truly Outrageous: A Tribute to Starlight Records (2015) ====
Hasbro Studios with Legacy Recordings released its first non-soundtrack album, Truly Outrageous: A Tribute to Starlight Records on August 7, 2015. The record was part of the promotion of the Jem film. The album consisted of original songs that only had the titles and sometimes a few lyrics in common with the Jem TV series songs. This release was digital only.

Truly Outrageous: A Tribute to Starlight Records
No.	Title	Music	Length
1.	"Truly Outrageous"	BEAN
2.	"LoveSick"	Chrissie Poland
3.	"Running Like the Wind"	LACES
4.	"Gimme Gimme"	LACES
5.	"Destiny"	Barnaby Bright
6.	"Like a Dream"	Madi Diaz
7.	"All in the Style"	Ben Thornewill
8.	"Abracadabra"	Meiko
9.	"Glitter & Gold"	Suzanna Choffel
10.	"I'm Okay"	SKYES
11.	"The Real Me"	Amanda Brown
12.	"Beat This"	Alice Lee

==== 40th anniversary releases (2025) ====
An extended play featuring six re-recorded songs from Jem, sung by Britta Phillips, the singing voice for Jem, was released by Hasbro and The Orchard on July 25, 2025, coinciding with the show's 40th anniversary. A deluxe album, including re-recorded versions of Glitter & Gold and Fun To Be Scared!, was released on November 28. A cover version of Wham!'s Last Christmas was released on December 5.

Outrageous Anthems - Reimagined
No.	Title	Length
1.	"Jem and the Holograms Theme Song"	1:35
2.	"Truly Outrageous"	2:09
3.	"Only The Beginning"	1:56
4.	"Like A Dream"	1:54
5.	"I Got My Eye On You"	2:07
6.	"She's Got The Power"	2:06

A second extended play, titled Jem and the Holograms: Music is Magic, was released on July 3, 2026.

Jem and the Holograms: Music is Magic
No.	Title	Length
1.	"Music Is Magic"	1:41
2.	"Who Is He Kissing?"	2:00
3.	"Twilight in Paris"	1:41
4.	"It Depends On The Mood I'm In"	2:05

=== Live-action series ===
Hasbro Entertainment began work on a brand new series around late 2025. The show was greenlit to Amazon MGM Studios in June 2026 with Lisa Joy and Jonathan Nolan producing.
