= My Animal (album) =

Studio album by Boy Hits Car
- Released: 1998
- Recorded: 1997
- Genre: Alternative metal, nu metal
- Label: NMG Records

Boy Hits Car chronology
My Animal (1998)	Boy Hits Car (2001)

My Animal (1998) is the debut album by American rock band Boy Hits Car.

== Background ==
In 1995, a Baltimore-based independent label booked Boy Hits Car on their first national tour—six weeks straight performing nearly every night. During this time, the band decided that no matter what the cost, they would try to make a lifestyle out of performing their music—music they eventually dubbed 'Lovecore'. BHC continued to write, record, and tour until 1997 when they signed with a Texas-based independent label.

They recorded their first full-length CD—'My Animal'—which was released and distributed in 1998 through NMG music. After a few weeks, they lost their distribution deal but the band pressed on independently.

The song "Mr. Loh" is about real-life Malibu man Eugene Loh, who would often do calisthenics on the beach while naked. His daughter, writer Sandra Tsing Loh, has written several times about the incongruity of her father being commemorated in this way. Mr. Loh died on March 1, 2018, at the age of 97.

== Track listing ==
1. "Hope" – 3:24
2. "Clear" – 3:58
3. "I'm a Cloud" – 4:45
4. "La Playa" – 3:59
5. "Happy" – 5:12
6. "Mr. Loh" – 4:57
7. "Make Me Pure" – 5:18
8. "Letter from Prison" – 3:03
9. "Fury 'N' I" – 6:16
10. "Benkei" – 3:48
11. "In the Lateness of a Day" – 4:54
12. "My Animal" – 6:09
