= List of comics based on television programs =

This is an incomplete list of comics based on television programs. Often a television program becomes successful, popular or attains cult status and the franchise produces spin-offs that often include comics.

A number of companies specialise in licensed properties, including Gold Key Comics, Dark Horse Comics, Titan Books and Dynamite Entertainment. With the bigger series the license can often pass to a number of companies over the history of the title.

== 0–9 ==
Based on	Title	Length	Format	Publication date	Authors	Publisher	Notes	Collected editions
24	24: One Shot	1 issue	One-shot	July 2004	J. C. Vaughan, Mark L. Haynes	IDW Publishing		
24	24 Stories	1 issue	One-shot	January 2005	J. C. Vaughan, Mark L. Haynes	IDW Publishing		
24	24: Midnight Sun	1 issue	One-shot	July 2005	J. C. Vaughan, Mark L. Haynes	IDW Publishing		
24	24: Nightfall	5 issues	Limited series	November 2006—March 2007	J. C. Vaughan, Mark L. Haynes	IDW Publishing		Paperback: 1600100899/978-1600100895
24	24: Cold Warriors	1 issue	One-shot	February 2008	Beau Smith	IDW Publishing		24: Omnibus TP (1600105440/978-1600105449)
24	24: Underground	5 issues	Limited series	April—August 2014	Ed Brisson	IDW Publishing		Paperback: 1631400541/978-1631400544
24	24: Legacy - Rules of Engagement	5 issues	Limited series	April—August 2017	Christopher Farnsworth	IDW Publishing		Paperback: 1684050391/978-1684050390
77 Sunset Strip	Four Color (series 2) #1066, #1106, #1159, #1211, #1263, #1291	6 issues	One-shot	January 1959-March 1960, June–August 1960, January–February 1961, September–November 1961, December 1961-February 1962, March–May 1962	Eric Freiwald, Robert Schaefer	Dell Comics		No
77 Sunset Strip	77 Sunset Strip (series 1) #01-742-209	1 issue		July–September 1962	?	Dell Comics		No
77 Sunset Strip	77 Sunset Strip (series 2)	2 issues	Ongoing series	November 1962 – February 1963	?	Gold Key Comics		No

== A ==
Based on	Title	Length	Format	Publication date	Authors	Publisher	Notes	Collected editions
Adam-12	Adam-12	10 issues	Ongoing series	December 1973 – February 1976	?	Gold Key Comics		No
The Addams Family (1973)	The Addams Family	3 issues	Ongoing series	October 1974 – April 1975	?	Gold Key Comics		No
Adventure Time	Adventure Time		Ongoing series	February 2012 – April 2018		Boom! Studios		
Adventure Time	Adventure Time: Banana Guard Academy	6 issues	Limited series	July 2014 – December 2014	Kent Osborne, Dylan Haggerty	Boom! Studios		
Adventure Time	Adventure Time/Regular Show	6 issues	Limited series	August 2017 – January 2018	Conor McCreery	Boom! Studios	Crossover with Regular Show.	
Adventure Time	Adventure Time: Beginning of the End	3 issues	Limited series	May – July 2018	Ted Anderson	Boom! Studios		
Adventure Time	Adventure Time: Season 11	6 issues	Limited series	October 2018 – May 2019	Sonny Liew, Ted Anderson	Boom! Studios		
Adventures in Paradise	Four Color (series 2) #1301	1 issue	One-shot	February–April 1962	Lionel Ziprin	Dell Comics		No
The Adventures of Jim Bowie	Four Color (series 2) #893, #993	2 issues	One-shot	March 1958, May–July 1959	Eric Freiwald, Robert Schaefer	Dell Comics		No
The Adventures of Puss in Boots	The Adventures of Puss in Boots	4 issues	Limited series	May – August 2016	Christopher Cooper, Max Davidson, Alex Matthews	Titan Comics		
The Adventures of Rocky and Bullwinkle and Friends	Four Color (series 2) #1128, #1152, #1166, #1275, #1311: "Rocky and His Friends"	5 issues	One-shot	August–October 1960, December 1960-February 1961, March–May 1961, December 1961-February 1962, March–July 1962	Al Kilgore	Dell Comics		
The Adventures of Rocky and Bullwinkle and Friends	Four Color (series 2) #1270: "Bullwinkle and Rocky"	1 issue	One-shot	March–May 1962	Al Kilgore	Dell Comics		
The Adventures of Rocky and Bullwinkle and Friends	Rocky and His Fiendish Friends	5 issues	Ongoing series	October 1962 – September 1963	Al Kilgore	Gold Key Comics		
The Adventures of Rocky and Bullwinkle and Friends	Fractured Fairy Tales	1 issue	One-shot	October 1962	Al Kilgore	Gold Key Comics		
The Adventures of Rocky and Bullwinkle and Friends	Bullwinkle #01-090-209	1 issue	One-shot	July–September 1962	Al Kilgore	Dell Comics		
The Adventures of Rocky and Bullwinkle and Friends	Bullwinkle	25 issues	Ongoing series	November 1962 – February 1963; April 1972 – February 1980	Al Kilgore	Gold Key Comics	Retitled Bullwinkle and Rocky from #3, the later issues consisted of reprints previous issues starting from the aforementioned #3 up to #25, the last issue.	
The Adventures of Rocky and Bullwinkle and Friends	Bullwinkle and Rocky (1970)	7 issues	Ongoing series	July 1970 – July 1971	?	Charlton Comics		
The Adventures of Rocky and Bullwinkle and Friends	Blackthorne 3-D Series #18: "Bullwinkle and Rocky 3-D"	1 issue	One-shot	March 1987	John Stephenson, Shel Dorf, June Foray	Blackthorne Publishing	Originally published in anaglyph 3D.	
The Adventures of Rocky and Bullwinkle and Friends	Blackthorne 3-D Series #50: "Bullwinkle for President in 3-D"	1 issue	One-shot	Fall 1988	John Stephenson	Blackthorne Publishing	Originally published in anaglyph 3D.	
The Adventures of Rocky and Bullwinkle and Friends	Bullwinkle and Rocky (1987)	9 issues	Ongoing series	November 1987 – March 1989	Dave Manak	Star Comics		
The Adventures of Rocky and Bullwinkle and Friends	Rocky and Bullwinkle	4 issues	Limited series	March – June 2014	Mark Evanier	IDW Publishing		
The Adventures of Rocky and Bullwinkle and Friends	The Rocky and Bullwinkle Show	3 issues	Limited series	2017 – September 2018	Todd Livingston and Al Kilgore	American Mythology Productions		
The Adventures of Rocky and Bullwinkle and Friends	Rocky and Bullwinkle — As Seen on TV	3 issues	Limited series	2019 – March 2020	Todd Livingston, Todd Clark, Al Clark, Al Kilgore	American Mythology Productions		
The Adventures of Sir Lancelot	Four Color (series 2) #775: "Sir Lancelot and Brian"	1 issue	One-shot	March 1957	?	Dell Comics		No
The Adventures of the Galaxy Rangers	Adventures of the Galaxy Rangers	5 issues	Ongoing series	June – September 1988		Marvel UK		No
The A-Team	The A-Team	3 issues	Limited series	March – May 1984	Jim Salicrup, Alan Kupperberg	Marvel Comics		No
Æon Flux	Æon Flux	4 issues	Limited series	October 2005 – January 2006	Mike Kennedy	Dark Horse Comics		
Aggretsuko	Aggretsuko	6 issues	Limited series	February – September 2020	Daniel Barnes	Oni Press		
Aggretsuko	Aggretsuko: Meet Her Friends	3 issues	Limited series	Cat Farris, Arielle Jovellanos, James Asmus	Cat Farris, Arielle Jovellanos, James Asmus	Oni Press		
Aggretsuko	Aggretsuko: Meet Her World	3 issues	Limited series	April – June 2021	Molly Muldoon, Annie Griggs, Danielle Radford	Oni Press		
Aggretsuko	Aggretsuko Super Fun Special	1 issue	One-shot	October 2021	Brenda Hickey, Josh Tierney, Shadia Amin	Oni Press		
Aggretsuko	Aggretsuko: Out of Office	4 issues	Limited series	November 2021 – April 2022	Brenda Hickey	Oni Press		
Aggretsuko	Aggretsuko: Out to Lunch	4 issues	Limited series	August – November 2022	Josh Trujillo	Oni Press		
ALF	ALF	50 issues	Ongoing series	March 1988 – February 1992	Michael Gallagher	Marvel Comics		
Alien Nation	Alien Nation Television Special: The Lost Episode	1 issue	One-shot	1992		Malibu Comics		No
Alvin and the Chipmunks (1983)	Alvin and the Chipmunks	5 issues	Ongoing series	July 1992 – May 1994		Harvey Comics		No
The Alvin Show	Alvin	28 issues	Ongoing series	October–December 1962 – October 1973	?	Dell Comics		No
The Amazing Chan and the Chan Clan	The Amazing Chan and the Chan Clan	4 issues	Ongoing series	May 1973 – February 1974	Mark Evanier	Gold Key Comics		No
The Amazing World of Gumball	The Amazing World of Gumball	8 issues	Limited series	June 2014 – March 2015	Frank Gibson, Kevin Panetta, Tyson Hesse	Boom! Studios		
The Andy Griffith Show	Four Color (series 2) #1252, #1341: "Andy Griffith"	2 issues	One-shot	January–March 1962, April–June 1962	Don Segall	Dell Comics		No
Angel (1999)	Main article: List of Angel comics							
Animaniacs	Animaniacs Christmas Special	1 issue	One-shot	December 1994		DC Comics		No
Animaniacs	Animaniacs	59 issues	Ongoing series	March 1995 – April 2000	Amy Weingartner, Bobbi JG Weiss, Dave King, John Walker, Dana Kurtin, Dan Slott, Jesse Leon McCann, Jennifer Moore, Sean Carolan, Gary Glasberg, Mark McKain, Bill Matheny, Michael Dare, Jeff Suess, Matt Wayne, Joe Edkin, Frank Strom, Chuck Kim, Neal Sternecky	DC Comics	Retitled Animaniacs – Featuring Pinky and the Brain from #43.	No
Animaniacs	Animaniacs: Welcome to Emergency World	1 issue	Promotion	1995	Bobbi Weiss; David Cody Weiss	Warner Bros. Worldwide Publishing	Give-away promotional comic published for American Red Cross.	No
Annie Oakley	Four Color (series 2) #438, #481, #575: "Annie Oakley"	3 issues	One-shot	December 1952, July 1953, August 1954	Philip Evans	Dell Comics	Retitled Annie Oakley and Tagg from the second installment of the series; the first issue incidentally predates the TV series by 14 months and establishes familiar elements including the debut of Tagg, Annie's young brother who was a recurring main character in the series.	No
Annie Oakley	Annie Oakley and Tagg (series 1) #4–18	15 issue	Ongoing series	July–September 1955 – January–March 1959	Philip Evans, Eric Freiwald, Robert Schaefer	Dell Comics		No
Annie Oakley	Annie Oakley and Tagg (series 2)	1 issue	One-shot	July 1965	?	Gold Key Comics	Reprints five stories issues #11, #12, #15, and #18 from the Dell series.	No
The Aquanauts	Four Color (series 2) #1197	1 issue	One-shot	May–July 1961	?	Dell Comics		No
The Archie Show	Archie's TV Laugh-Out	106 issues	Ongoing series	December 1969 – February 1986		Archie Comics		
Astro Boy	Astro Boy (1965)	1 issue	One-shot	August 1965	?	Gold Key Comics	First story adapted from the episode "Gadem" ("Gangor the Monster") from the 1963 TV series.	No
Astro Boy	The Original Astro Boy	20 issues	Ongoing series	September 1987 – June 1989	Mike Dimpsey	Now Comics	Based mostly on the 1963 TV series, but later featuring elements from the 1980 TV series.	No
The Atom Ant/Secret Squirrel Show	Atom Ant	1 issue	One-shot	January 1966	?	Gold Key Comics	The comic features three Atom Ant stories: "Up and at 'Em", "On with the Game" and one story untitled. The other two stories guest-featured characters from the same show, "Out-Foxed by a Pooch" with Precious Pupp and "Open Season on Salesmen" with the Hillbilly Bears.	
The Atom Ant/Secret Squirrel Show	Secret Squirrel	1 issue	One-shot	October 1966	?	Gold Key Comics	The comic features six Secret Squirrel stories. The other two stories guest-featured characters from the same show, "Seeing Double" with Squiddly Diddly and an untitled story with Winsome Witch.	No
The Atom Ant/Secret Squirrel Show	Secret Squirrel Kite Fun Book	1 issue	Minicomic	1966	?	Western Publishing	Reddy Kilowatt, Inc. premium.	No
The Atom Ant/Secret Squirrel Show	Hanna-Barbera Presents #1	1 issue	One-shot	November 1995	Earl Kress	Archie Comics	The comic features two stories for one of each: "I Spied a Spider" with Atom Ant and "Thunderbell" with Secret Squirrel. The third and final story "Blow Little Blowfish, Blow" is a crossover with both characters.	No
The Atom Ant/Secret Squirrel Show	Cartoon Network Presents #20	1 issue	One-shot	April 1999	Terry Collins, Michael Eury	DC Comics	"The Duplicate Dilemma" is a Secret Squirrel and Morocco Mole story, "Dietbolical" is an Atom Ant story.	No
Avatar: The Last Airbender	Main article: Avatar: The Last Airbender (comics)							
The Avengers	John Steed Emma Peel	1 issue	One-shot	November 1968	?	Gold Key Comics	The comic features reprints of two stories from #756–760 ("The Roman Invasion") and #761–766 ("The Mirage Maker") of the British magazine TV Comic.	No
The Avengers	Steed and Mrs. Peel (1990)	3 issues	Limited series	December 1990 – April 1992	Grant Morrison	Eclipse Comics		Steed and Mrs. Peel: The Golden Game TPB
The Avengers	Steed and Mrs. Peel (2012)	6 issues	Limited series	January – June 2012	Grant Morrison, Anne Caufield	Boom! Studios		
The Avengers	Steed and Mrs. Peel (2013)	12 issues	Ongoing series	August 2012 – July 2013	Mark Waid, Caleb Monroe	Boom! Studios		Vol. 1 TPB; Vol. 2 TPB; Vol. 3 TPB
The Avengers	Steed and Mrs Peel: We're Needed	3 issues	July – September 2014	Limited series	Ian Edginton	Boom! Studios		
The Avengers	Batman '66 Meets Steed and Mrs Peel	6 issues	Limited series	September 2016 – February 2017	Ian Edginton	DC Comics, Boom! Studios	Crossover with Batman '66.	HC; TPB

== B ==
Based on	Title	Length	Format	Publication date	Authors	Publisher	Notes	Collected editions
Babylon 5	Babylon 5	11 issues	Ongoing series	January – December 1995	J. Michael Straczynski, Mark Moretti, Tim DeHaas, David Gerrold	DC Comics		
Bachelor Father	Four Color (series 2) #1332	2 issues	One-shot	April–June 1962	?	Dell Comics		No
Bachelor Father	Bachelor Father #2	2 issues	Ongoing series (planned)	September–November 1962	John Stanley	Dell Comics		No
Back to the Future	Back to the Future Special	1 issue	One-shot	1991	Dwayne McDuffie	Harvey Comics	Give-away at Universal Studios Florida; main feature story, "The Gang's All Here!", reprinted from Issue #1 proper.	No
Back to the Future	Back to the Future (series 1)	4 issues	Ongoing series	November 1991 – June 1992	Dwayne McDuffie	Harvey Comics	All stories, except the first issue, are adaptations of select episodes from the series; Issue #2 adapts episode 3, Issue #3 adapts episode 5 and Issue #4 adapts episode 12.	No
Back to the Future	Back to the Future (series 2)	3 issues	Limited series	October 1992 – January 1993	Dwayne McDuffie	Harvey Comics		No
The Banana Splits	The Banana Splits	8 issues	Ongoing series	January 1970 – October 1971		Gold Key Comics		No
The Banana Splits	Suicide Squad/Banana Splits Special #1	1 issue	One-shot	May 2017	Antony Bedard, Mark Russell	DC Comics	Crossover with DC's Suicide Squad; part of the DC Meets Hanna-Barbera comic book line.	
Bat Masterson	Four Color (series 2) #1013	9 issues	One-shot	August–October 1959	Gaylord DuBois	Dell Comics		No
Bat Masterson	Bat Masterson #2—9	9 issues	Ongoing series	February–April 1960 – November 1961-January 1962	Gaylord DuBois	Dell Comics		No
Batman	Batman '66	30 issues	Ongoing series	September 2013 – February 2016	Jeff Parker, Tom Peyer, Art Baltazar, Franco, Gabe Soria, Rob Williams, Mike W. Barr, Ray Fawkes, Lee Allred	DC Comics		
Batman	Batman '66 Meets the Green Hornet	6 issues	Limited series	August 2014 – January 2015	Kevin Smith, Ralph Garman	DC Comics, Dynamite Entertainment	Crossover with The Green Hornet.	
Batman	Batman '66: The Lost Episode	1 issue	One-shot	January 2015	Harlan Ellison, Len Wein	DC Comics		
Batman	Batman '66 Meets the Man from U.N.C.L.E.	6 issues	Limited series	February – July 2016	Jeff Parker	DC Comics, Dynamite Entertainment	Crossover with The Man from U.N.C.L.E..	
Batman	Batman '66 Meets Steed and Mrs Peel	6 issues	Limited series	September 2016 – February 2017	Ian Edginton	DC Comics, Boom! Studios	Crossover with The Avengers.	
Batman	Batman '66 Meets Wonder Woman '77	6 issues	Limited series	March – August 2017	Jeff Parker, Marc Andreyko	DC Comics	Crossover with Wonder Woman.	
Batman	Batman '66 Meets the Legion of Super Heroes	1 issue	One-shot	September 2017	Lee Allred	DC Comics	Crossover with the Legion of Super-Heroes.	
Batman	Archie Meets Batman '66	6 issues	Limited series	September 2018 – March 2019	Michael Moreci, Jeff Parker	DC Comics, Archie Comics	Crossover with Archie.	
The Batman	The Batman Strikes!	50 issues	Ongoing series	November 2004 – December 2008	Bill Matheny, J. Torres, Matt Manning, Jai Nitz, Scott Beatty, Russell Lissau, Josh Elder, Stephen Nilson, James Peaty	DC Comics		
Batman: The Animated Series	The Batman Adventures	36 issues	Ongoing series	October 1992 – October 1995	Kelly Puckett, Martin Pasko, Michael Reeves, Alan Grant, Dan Raspler, Ty Templeton	DC Comics		
Batman: The Animated Series	The Batman Adventures: Mad Love	1 issues	One-shot	February 1994	Paul Dini	DC Comics	Later adapted into episode 24 of The New Batman Adventures (aired January 16, 1999).	
Batman: The Animated Series	The Batman and Robin Adventures	25 issues	Ongoing series	November 1995 – December 1997	Paul Dini, Ty Templeton, Kelley Puckett	DC Comics		
Batman: The Animated Series	The Batman Adventures: The Lost Years	5 issues	Limited series	January – May 1998	Hilary J. Bader	DC Comics		
Batman: The Animated Series	Batman: Gotham Adventures	60 issues	Ongoing series	June 1998 – July 2002	Ty Templeton, Kelley Puckett, Scott Peterson, Chuck Dixon, Ed Brubaker, Tim Levins, Jason Hall, Dan Slott	DC Comics	Based on the sequel series The New Batman Adventures (1997–1999).	
Batman: The Animated Series	Batman: The Adventures Continue	8 issues	Limited series	August 2020 – March 2021	Paul Dini, Alan Burnett	DC Comics		
Batman: The Animated Series	Batman: The Adventures Continue Season Two	7 issues	Limited series	August 2021 – February 2022	Paul Dini, Alan Burnett	DC Comics		
Batman: The Animated Series	Batman: The Adventures Continue Season Three	7 issues	Limited series	March – December 2023	Paul Dini, Alan Burnett	DC Comics		
Batman: The Brave and the Bold (comics)	Batman: The Brave and the Bold	22 issues	Ongoing series	March 2009 – December 2010	Matt Wayne, J. Torres, Landry Walker, Sholly Fisch, Adam Schlagman, Bob Greenberger	DC Comics		
Batman: The Brave and the Bold (comics)	The All New! Batman: The Brave and the Bold	16 issues	Ongoing series	January 2011 – April 2012	Sholly Fisch	DC Comics		
Battle of the Planets (comics)	Battle of the Planets (1979)	10 issues	Ongoing series	June 1979 – December 1980	Gary Poole, Bob Langhans, Charlie Seeger	Gold Key Comics, Whitman Publishing		
Battle of the Planets (comics)	TV Comic #1530–1671	42 issues	Comic story, serial	April 17, 1981 – December 30, 1983		Polystyle Publications		
Battle of the Planets (comics)	Battle of the Planets (2002)	13 issues	Ongoing series	August 2002 – September 2003	Munier Sharrieff	Top Cow Productions, Image Comics		
Battle of the Planets (comics)	Battle of the Planets/Witchblade	1 issue	One-shot	February 2003	Munier Sharrieff	Top Cow Productions, Image Comics	Crossover with Witchblade.	
Battle of the Planets (comics)	Battle of the Planets/ThunderCats	1 issue	One-shot	May 2003	Munier Sharrieff	Top Cow Productions, Image Comics	Crossover with ThunderCats, followed by the similarly titled ThunderCats/Battle of the Planets from DC Comics in July 2003.	
Battle of the Planets (comics)	Battle of the Planets: Mark	1 issue	One-shot	May 2003	Munier Sharrieff	Top Cow Productions, Image Comics		
Battle of the Planets (comics)	Battle of the Planets: Jason	1 issue	One-shot	July 2003	Munier Sharrieff	Top Cow Productions, Image Comics		
Battle of the Planets (comics)	Battle of the Planets Manga	3 issues	Limited series	November 2003 – January 2004	David Wohl	Top Cow Productions		
Battle of the Planets (comics)	Battle of the Planets: Princess	6 issues	Limited series	November 2004 – May 2005	David Wohl	Top Cow Productions, Image Comics		
Battlestar Galactica (1978) (comics)	Marvel Comics Super Special #8	1 issue	Magazine	January 1979	Roger McKenzie	Marvel Comics	Adaptation of the pilot TV film.	
Battlestar Galactica (1978) (comics)	Battlestar Galactica (1979)	23 issues	Ongoing series	March 1979 – January 1981	Roger McKenzie, Bill Mantlo, Walt Simonson	Marvel Comics	The first issues are an adaptation of the pilot TV film and the second overall episode "Lost Planet of the Gods", the remainder of the series are all original material.	
Battlestar Galactica (1978) (comics)	Look-in #43–52, #1–42	51 issues	Comic story, serial	October 20, 1979 – October 11, 1980		ITV	Published weekly; the issue numbering was reset midway through the four installments of the first comic storyline.	
Battlestar Galactica (1978) (comics)	Battlestar Galactica: Apollo's Journey	3 issues	Limited series	April 1995	Richard Hatch	Maximum Press		
Battlestar Galactica (1978) (comics)	Battlestar Galactica: War of Eden	4 issues	Limited series	July – November 1995	Rob Liefeld, Robert Napton	Maximum Press		Paperback: 1-888610-01-8
Battlestar Galactica (1978) (comics)	Battlestar Galactica: The Enemy Within	3 issues	Limited series	November 1995 – February 1996	Rob Liefeld, Robert Napton, Greg Aronowitz	Maximum Press		
Battlestar Galactica (1978) (comics)	Battlestar Galactica: Starbuck	3 issues	Limited series	December 1995 – March 1996	Rob Liefeld, Robert Napton	Maximum Press		
Battlestar Galactica (1978) (comics)	Battlestar Galactica: Journey's End	4 issues	Limited series	August – November 1996	Rob Liefeld, Robert Napton	Maximum Press		
Battlestar Galactica (1978) (comics)	Battlestar Galactica: Special Edition	1 issue	One-shot	January 1997	Chris Scalf	Maximum Press		
Battlestar Galactica (1978) (comics)	Battlestar Galactica (1997)	5 issues	Ongoing series	December 1997 – June 1998	James A. Kuhoric, Chris Scalf	Realm Press		
Battlestar Galactica (1978) (comics)	Battlestar Galactica: Search for Sanctuary	1 issue	One-shot	September 1998	James A. Kuhoric, Chris Scalf	Realm Press		No
Battlestar Galactica (1978) (comics)	Battlestar Galactica: Search for Sanctuary Special Edition	1 issue	One-shot	April 2000		Realm Press		No
Battlestar Galactica (1978) (comics)	Battlestar Galactica Special Edition: Centurion Prime	1 issue	One-shot	March 1999	James A. Kuhoric	Realm Press		
Battlestar Galactica (1978) (comics)	Battlestar Galactica 1999 Tourbook	1 issues	One-shot	May 1999	James A. Kuhoric	Realm Press		
Battlestar Galactica (1978) (comics)	Battlestar Galactica: Season III	3 issues	Limited series	June – September 1999	James A. Kuhoric, Chris Scalf	Realm Press		
Battlestar Galactica (1978) (comics)	Galactica: The New Millennium	1 issue	Ongoing series (planned)	September 1999	Jim Shooter, Scott Braden, James A. Kuhoric	Realm Press	Planned ongoing series cancelled after first issue.	
Battlestar Galactica (1978) (comics)	Battlestar Galactica: Eve of Destruction Prelude	1 issue	One-shot	December 1999	Vaughn & Busch	Realm Press		
Battlestar Galactica (1978) (comics)	Battlestar Galactica: Gallery Special	1 issue		April 2000		Realm Press		
Battlestar Galactica (1978) (comics)	Battlestar Galactica Classic (volume 1)	5 issues	Limited series	October 2006 – March 2007	Rick Remender	Dynamite Entertainment		
Battlestar Galactica (1978) (comics)	Battlestar Galactica: Cylon Apocalypse	4 issues	Limited series	March – June 2007	Javier Grillo-Marxuach	Dynamite Entertainment		
Battlestar Galactica (1978) (comics)	Galactica 1980	4 issues	Limited series	September 2009 – January 2010	Marc Guggenheim	Dynamite Entertainment	Re-imagined alternate telling based on the eponymous sequel series.	Paperback: 1606902288/978-1606902288
Battlestar Galactica (1978) (comics)	Battlestar Galactica (volume 2)	12 issues	Limited series	May 2013 – June 2014	Dan Abnett, Andy Lanning	Dynamite Entertainment		
Battlestar Galactica (1978) (comics)	Battlestar Galactica: Starbuck	4 issues	Limited series	2013 – 2014	Tony Lee	Dynamite Entertainment		
Battlestar Galactica (1978) (comics)	Li'l Battlestar Galactica	1 issue	One-shot	January 2014	Art Baltazar, Franco	Dynamite Entertainment	Part of the Li'l Dynamites series of one-shots, featuring super deformed versions of licensed properties.	
Battlestar Galactica (1978) (comics)	Battlestar Galactica Annual	1 issue	Annual, one-shot	April 2014	Robert Napton	Dynamite Entertainment		
Battlestar Galactica (1978) (comics)	Steampunk Battlestar Galactica 1880	4 issues	Limited series	August – November 2014	Tony Lee	Dynamite Entertainment	Parody reimagining of the 1978 series with a steampunk theme.	
Battlestar Galactica (1978) (comics)	Battlestar Galactica: Death of Apollo	6 issues	Limited series	December 2014 – May 2015	Dan Abnett	Dynamite Entertainment		
Battlestar Galactica (1978) (comics)	Battlestar Galactica (volume 3)	5 issues	Limited series	August – December 2016	Cullen Bunn	Dynamite Entertainment		
Battlestar Galactica (1978) (comics)	Battlestar Galactica vs. Battlestar Galactica	6 issues	Limited series	January – June 2018	Peter David	Dynamite Entertainment	Crossover of the 1978 and 2004 series.	Paperback: 1524107204 / 9781524107208
Battlestar Galactica (1978) (comics)	Battlestar Galactica Classic (volume 2)	6 issues	Limited series	October 2018 – May 2019	John Jackson Miller	Dynamite Entertainment		
Battlestar Galactica (2004) (comics)	Battlestar Galactica (volume 1)	13 issues	Ongoing series	June 2006 – July 2007	Greg Pak	Dynamite Entertainment		
Battlestar Galactica (2004) (comics)	Battlestar Galactica: Zarek	4 issues	Limited series	December 2006 – April 2007	Brandon Jerwa	Dynamite Entertainment		
Battlestar Galactica (2004) (comics)	Battlestar Galactica: Season Zero	12 issues	Limited series	August 2007 – August 2008	Brandon Jerwa	Dynamite Entertainment		
Battlestar Galactica (2004) (comics)	Battlestar Galactica: Pegasus	1 issue	One-shot	November 2007	Brandon Jerwa	Dynamite Entertainment		
Battlestar Galactica (2004) (comics)	Battlestar Galactica: Origins	11 issues	Limited series	December 2007 – October 2008	Seamus Kevin Fahey, Clay Carmouche, Robert Napton	Dynamite Entertainment		
Battlestar Galactica (2004) (comics)	Battlestar Galactica: Ghosts	#4 issues	Limited series	October 2008 – January 2009	Brandon Jerwa	Dynamite Entertainment		
Battlestar Galactica (2004) (comics)	Battlestar Galactica: Cylon War	4 issues	Limited series	January – April 2009	Eric Nylund, Joshua Ortega	Dynamite Entertainment		
Battlestar Galactica (2004) (comics)	Battlestar Galactica: The Final Five	#1—4 issues	Limited series	April – July 2009	Seamus Kevin Fahey, David Reed	Dynamite Entertainment		
Battlestar Galactica (2004) (comics)	Battlestar Galactica: Six	5 issues	Limited series	April 2014 – May 2015	J. T. Krul	Dynamite Entertainment		
Battlestar Galactica (2004) (comics)	Battlestar Galactica: Gods and Monsters	5 issues	Limited series	2016 – 2017	Karl Kesel	Dynamite Entertainment		
Battlestar Galactica (2004) (comics)	Battlestar Galactica: Twilight Command	5 issues	Limited series	February – June 2019	Michael Moreci	Dynamite Entertainment		
Beany and Cecil	Four Color (series 2) #368, #414, #448, #477, #530, #570, #635: "Bob Clampett's Beany and Cecil"	7 issues	One-shot	January 1952, August 1952, January 1953, June 1953, January 1954, July 1954, June 1955		Dell Comics	All seven issues related to the original series Time for Beany.	
Beany and Cecil	Beany and Cecil	5 issues	Ongoing series	July 1962 – September 1963	Don Segall, Willie Ito	Dell Comics		No
Beauty and the Beast	Beauty and the Beast	6 issues	Ongoing series	May – October 1993	David Campiti, Karen May, Cynthy J. Wood, Paula Vitaris, Peter Formaini	Innovation Publishing		No
Beavis and Butt-Head	Beavis and Butt-Head	28 issues	Ongoing series	March 1994 – June 1996	Mike Lackey, Sam Johnson, Chris Marcil, Barry Dutter, Guy Maxtone-Graham, Don London, Glenn Herdling	Marvel Comics		
Beetlejuice	Beetlejuice #1	3 issues	One-shot	October 1991	Angelo DeCesare	Harvey Comics		No
Beetlejuice	Beetlejuice in the Netherworld #1	3 issues	One-shot	November 1991	Michael Gallagher, Ernie Colon, Dave Manak	Harvey Comics		No
Beetlejuice	Beetlejuice: Horror-Day Special! #1	3 issues	One-shot	February 1992	Michael Gallagher	Harvey Comics		No
Beetlejuice	Beetlejuice: Crimebusters on the Haunt	3 issues	Limited series	September – November 1992	Angelo DeCesare	Harvey Comics	Main feature storyline titled "Elliot Mess and the Unwashables".	No
Ben 10 (2005)	Cartoon Network Action Pack! #2, #4, #6, #7, #9, #11, #12, #13, #14, #15, #16, #17, #18, #19, #20	15 issues	Ongoing series	August 2006, October 2006, December 2006, January 2007, March 2007, May 2007, June 2007, July 2007, August 2007, September 2007, October 2007, November 2007, December 2007, January 2008, February 2008		DC Comics	Seventeen stories spanned in fifteen issues with two stories featured in issues #14 and #20; the following stories in order: "Ole!" (#2), "Fast Lane" (#4), "Snow Blind" (#6), "Fear Itself" (#7), "A Villain a Day" (#9), "Techno Zombies" (#11), "Barbershop Blues" (#12), "Blast from the Past" (#13), "Nemesis" (#14), "The Height of Heat" (#14), "Space Camp and Beyond" (#15), "Greasy Lightning" (#16), "Swimming with Sharks" (#17), "Monkey Business" (#18), "Eggs with Legs" (#19), "Intergalactic Spazz Club" (#20) and "Aqua Nut" (#20).	
Ben Casey	Ben Casey	10 issues	Ongoing series	June–July 1962 – June–August 1965	Carl Memling, D.J. Arneson	Dell Comics		No
The Benny Hill Show	Look-in #???–???	??? issues	Comic story, serial	January 1975 – January 1981		ITV		
The Beverly Hillbillies	The Beverly Hillbillies	21 issues	Ongoing series	April–June 1963 – October 1971		Dell Comics		No
Beware the Batman	Beware the Batman	6 issues	Limited series	December 2013 – May 2014	Ivan Cohen, Matthew K. Manning, Scott Beatty, Mike W. Barr	DC Comics		
Bewitched	Bewitched	14 issues	Ongoing series	April–June 1965 – October 1969		Dell Comics		No
Big Bad Beetleborgs	Saban Powerhouse Special: "Power Rangers Turbo vs. Beetleborgs Metallix"	1 issue	Comic story	May 1997	Robert L. Washington III	Acclaim Comics, Valiant Comics	Crossover with Power Rangers Turbo.	No
Big Bad Beetleborgs	Saban Powerhouse #2: "Convention Chaos!"	1 issue	Back-up story	October 1997	Robert L. Washington III, John Herbert	Acclaim Comics		No
The Big O	The Big O THE ビッグオー (Za Biggu Ō)	22 chapters	Serialized manga	July 1999 – October 2001	Hitoshi Ariga	Kodansha	Serialized in Monthly Magazine Z.	Collected in 6 tankōbon volumes.
The Big O	The Big O: Lost Memory; THE ビッグオー ロストメモリー (Za Biggu Ō Rosuto Memorī)	10 chapters	Serialized manga	November 2002 – September 2003	Hitoshi Ariga	Kodansha	Serialized in Monthly Magazine Z.	Collected in 2 tankōbon volumes.
The Big Valley	The Big Valley	#1–6 issues	Ongoing series	June 1966 – October 1969	Paul S. Newman	Dell Comics		No
Biker Mice from Mars	Biker Mice from Mars (US)	3 issues	Limited series	November 1993 – January 1994	Rick Ungar, Bob Forward	Marvel Comics		No
The Bionic Woman	The Bionic Woman (1977)	5 issues	Limited series	October 1977 – June 1978	Joe Gill	Charlton Comics		
The Bionic Woman	The Bionic Woman (2012)	10 issues	Ongoing series	April 2012 – July 2013	Paul Tobin	Dynamite Entertainment		
The Bionic Woman	The Bionic Woman Season Four	4 issues	Limited series	September – December 2014	Brandon Jerwa	Dynamite Entertainment		
Blade Runner: Black Lotus	Blade Runner: Black Lotus	4 issues	Limited series	September – December 2022	Nancy A. Collins	Titan Comics		
Bless This House	Look-in #???–???	??? issues	Comic story, serial	December 73 – September 75	Angus Allan	ITV		
Bob's Burgers	Bob's Burgers (series 1)	5 issues	Limited series	August – December 2014	Mike Olsen, Jeff Drake, Rachel Hastings, Justin Hook, Chad Brewster	Dynamite Entertainment		
Bob's Burgers	Bob's Burgers (series 2)	16 issues	Ongoing series	June 2015 – October 2016		Dynamite Entertainment		
Bonanza	Four Color (series 2) #1110, #1221, #1283	3 issues	One-shots	June–August 1960, September–November 1961, February–April 1962	Gaylord DuBois	Dell Comics		No
Bonanza	Bonanza (series 1) #207—210	2 issues	Ongoing series	May–July 1962 – August–October 1962	Gaylord DuBois	Dell Comics		No
Bonanza	Bonanza (series 2)	37 issues	Ongoing series	December 1962 – August 1970		Gold Key Comics		No
Boots and Saddles	Four Color (series 2) #919, #1029, #1116	3 issues	One-shots	July 1958, September–November 1959, August–October 1960	Paul S. Newman	Dell Comics		No
The Brady Bunch	The Brady Bunch	2 issues	Ongoing series	February – May 1970	?	Dell Comics		No
Brave Eagle	Four Color (series 2) #705, #770, #816, #879, #929	5 issues	One-shots	January 1956, June 1956, February 1957, July 1957, February 1958, August 1958		Dell Comics		No
BraveStarr	Blackthorne 3-D Series #27: "BraveStarr in 3-D"—40	2 issues	Limited series	Fall 1987 – April 1988	John Stephenson, Jack Herman, Tim Tobolski	Blackthorne Publishing	Published in anaglyph 3D.	No
Brickleberry	Brickleberry: Armoogeddon	4 issues	Limited series	July – October 2016	Waco O'Guin, Roger Black	Dynamite Entertainment		Paperback: 1524102563/9781524102562
Bright's Boffins	Look-in #???–???	??? issues	Comic story, serial	April – August 71		ITV		
Broken Arrow	Four Color (series 2) #855, #947	2 issues	One-shot	November 1957, November 1958	Otto Binder	Dell Comics		No
The Buccaneers (1956)	Four Color (series 2) #800	1 issue	One-shot	May 1957	Leo Dorfman	Dell Comics		No
Buck Rogers in the 25th Century	Buck Rogers in the 25th Century #2—16	15 issues	Ongoing series	July 1979 – May 1982	Paul S. Newman, Michael Teitelbaum, J. M. DeMatteis, B. S. Watson	Gold Key Comics	The first three issues were an adaptation of the pilot film; the remaining twelve issues are original stories.	No
Buckskin	Four Color (series 2) #1011, #1107	2 issues	One-shot	July–September 1959, June–August 1960	Eric Freiwald, Robert Schaefer	Dell Comics		No
Buffalo Bill, Jr.	Four Color (series 2) #673, #742, #766, #798, #828, #856	6 issues	One-shot	January 1956, September 1956, February 1957, May 1957, August 1957, November 1957	?	Dell Comics		No
Buffalo Bill, Jr.	Buffalo Bill, Jr. #7–13	7 issues	Ongoing series	February–April 1958 – August–October 1959	Paul S. Newman, Gaylord DuBois	Dell Comics		No
Buffy the Vampire Slayer	Main article: List of Buffy the Vampire Slayer comics							
Burke's Law (1963)	Burke's Law	3 issues	Ongoing series	May 1964 – March 1965	Paul S. Newman	Dell Comics		No

== C ==
Based on	Title	Length	Format	Publication date	Authors	Publisher	Notes	Collected editions
Cain's Hundred	Cain's Hundred	2 issues	Ongoing series	May – September 1962		Dell Comics		No
Calvin and the Colonel	Four Color (series 2) #1354	2 issues	One-shot	April–June 1962	Don Segall	Dell Comics	The final overall regular issue in the Dell Four Color comic series.	No
Calvin and the Colonel	Calvin and the Colonel #2	2 issues	Ongoing series (planned)	July–September 1962	Don Segall	Dell Comics		No
Camp Candy	Camp Candy	6 issues	Limited series	Marvel Comics	Angelo DeCesare	May – October 1990		No
Camp Lazlo	Cartoon Network Block Party #25, #28, #29, #32, #34, #39, #40,	17 issues	Comic story, ongoing series	November 2006, February 2007, March 2007, June 2007, August 2007, January 2008, February 2008, April 2008, May 2008, June 2008, August 2008, November 2008, December 2008, January 2009, February 2009, April 2009, September 2009	Bobby London (#25, #28, #29, #43, #44, #50, #52), Robbie Bush (#32, #34, #39, #40), Jim Alexander (#42, #46, #49, #51, #59), Sam Agro (#54)	DC Comics	Seventeen self-contained stories spanning seventeen select issues, the following stories in order: "The Perfect Very Heavy Drizzle" (#25), "Survival of the Biggest" (#28), "Bullfrog Races" (#29), "Snake Lake" (#32), "The Three-Legged Race Monster!" (#34), "Underwear Overlords" (#39), "To Smell or Not to Smell" (#40), "2-Leg Shuffle" (#42), "Plane Talk" (#43), "Dirt-Devils" (#44), "Cardboard Raj" (#46), "Cap'n Spuds" (#49), "Honky Dory" (#50), "Vote Lazlo!" (#51), "I Spy Spiders" (#52), "Lake Monster Mash" (#54) and "Food Fight Frenzy!" (#59).	
Camp Runamuck	Camp Runamuck	1 issue	One-shot	April 1966	?	Dell Comics		No
Captain Caveman and the Teen Angels	Hanna-Barbera TV Stars #1: "The Shipping Magnet"	1 issue	Comic story	August 1978	Mark Evanier	Marvel Comics		No
Captain Caveman and the Teen Angels	Cartoon Network Presents #29: "Neanderthal Nightmare"	1 issue	Comic story	July 1999	Terry Collins	DC Comics		No
Captain Kangaroo	Four Color (series 2) #721, #780, #872	3 issues	One-shot	September 1956, March 1957, January 1958	?	Dell Comics		No
Captain N: The Game Master	Captain N: The Game Master	5 issues	Ongoing series	May – September 1990	Mark McClellan, Bill Vallely, George Caragonne, Bryan D. Leys	Valiant Comics		No
Captain Nice	Captain Nice	1 issue	One-shot	November 1967	?	Gold Key Comics		No
Captain Planet and the Planeteers	Captain Planet and the Planeteers	12 issues	Ongoing series	October 1991 – October 1992	Barry Dutter, Jim Salicrup, Pat Kelleher, Ian Rimmer, Simon Furman	Marvel Comics		No
Captain Scarlet and the Mysterons	Lady Penelope #53–120: "The Angels"	67 issues	Serial		City Magazines	January 21, 1967 – May 4, 1968		
Captain Scarlet and the Mysterons	TV Century 21 #141–242: "Captain Scarlet and the Mysterons"	101 issues	Serial	Angus Allan, Ron Embleton	City Magazines	Sep 30, 1967 – Sep 6, 1969		
Captain Scarlet and the Mysterons	Solo #19–30: "The Mark of the Mysterons"	12 issues	Serial		City Magazines	July 24, 1967 – September 9, 1967		
Captain Scarlet and the Mysterons	Solo #30; TV Tornado #36, #46–58; TV Tornado and Solo #37–45: "The Mysterons"	12 issues	Serial		City Magazines	September 16, 1967 – February 17, 1968		
Captain Video and His Video Rangers	Captain Video	6 issues	Ongoing series	February – December 1951	George Evans	Fawcett Comics		No
Car 54, Where Are You?	Four Color (series 2) #1257	7 issues	One-shot	March–May 1962	?	Dell Comics		No
Car 54, Where Are You?	Car 54, Where Are You? #2–7	7 issues	Ongoing series	June–August 1962 – September–November 1963	?	Dell Comics		No
Care Bears	Care Bears (1985)	20 issues	Ongoing series	November 1985 – January 1989	Howard Post, Stan Kay, Laura Hitchcock, Michael Gallagher, Dave Polter, Angelo DeCesare	Star Comics	Though based on a greeting card IP overall, elements from the Nelvana TV series The Care Bears Family (i.e. the villains No Heart and Beastly) did start appearing from #11; a story in issue #13, "Ball Bearings", is a crossover with another American Greetings property Madballs.	No
Care Bears: Unlock the Magic	Care Bears: Unlock the Magic	3 issues	Limited series	July – September 2019	Matthew Erman, Nadia Shammas	IDW Publishing		
Carole & Tuesday	Carole & Tuesday	24 chapters	Serialized manga	May 2, 2019 – July 2020	Morito Yamataka	Kadokawa Shoten	Serialized in Young Ace.	Collected in 3 tankōbon volumes.
Cartoon Network	Cartoon Network Presents	24 issues	Ongoing series	August 1997 – August 1999		DC Comics		
Cartoon Network	Cartoon Network Starring	18 issues	Ongoing series	September 1999 – February 2001		DC Comics		
Cartoon Network	Cartoon Cartoons	33 issues	Ongoing series	March 2001 – October 2004		DC Comics		
Cartoon Network	Cartoon Network: Block Party!	59 issues	Ongoing series	November 2004 – December 2008		DC Comics		
Cartoon Network	Cartoon Network: Action Pack!	67 issues	Ongoing series	July 2006 – August 2010		DC Comics		
Cartoon Network	Cartoon Network: Super Secret Crisis War!	6 issues	Limited series	June – November 2014	Louise Simonson	IDW Publishing		
Casey Jones	Four Color (series 2) #915	1 issue	One-shot	1958		Dell Comics		
Castle	Castle: A Calm Before Storm	5 issues	Limited series	February – July 2013	Peter David	Marvel Comics		
Castle	Castle: Deadly Storm	1 volume	Graphic novel	September 2011	Brian Michael Bendis, Kelly Sue DeConnick	Marvel Comics		
CB Bears	Hanna-Barbera TV Stars #1, #2, 4	3 issues	Comic story	August 1978, October 1978, February 1979	Mark Evanier (all 3 issues)	Marvel Comics	Four self-contained stories based on three of the six regular segments from the series spaning three select issues: "Silent Knight" (#1) is a Shake, Rattle & Roll story, "The Great Cole Slaw Conspiracy" (#2) and "King of the Mountain" (#4) are both CB Bears stories and "The Seaside Sneak-Thief" (#2) is an Undercover Elephant story.	
Challenge of the GoBots	Gobots Magazine	4 issues	Magazine	January – September 1986		Telepictures Publishing		No
Challenge of the GoBots	Go-Bots	5 issues	Limited series	November 2018 – March 2019	Tom Scioli	IDW Publishing		
Charlie's Angels	Charlie's Angels: The Devil You Know	5 issues	Limited series	June – October 2018	John Layman	Dynamite Entertainment		
Charlie's Angels	Charlie's Angels vs. the Bionic Woman	4 issues	Limited series	July – October 2019	Cameron Deordio	Dynamite Entertainment	Crossover with The Bionic Woman.	
Charmed (comics)	Charmed: Season 9	25 issues	Limited series	June 2010 – October 2012	Paul Ruditis, Raven Gregory	Zenescope Entertainment		
Charmed (comics)	Charmed: Season 10	20 issues	Limited series	October 2014 – September 2016	Constance M. Burge, Patrick Shand	Zenescope Entertainment		
Charmed (comics)	Charmed	5 issues	Limited series	October 2017	Erica Schultz	Dynamite Entertainment		
Checkmate	Checkmate	2 issues	Ongoing series	October – December 1962		Gold Key Comics		No
Cheyenne	Four Color (series 2) #734, #772, #803	25 issues	One-shot	January 1956, February 1957, May 1957		Dell Comics		No
Cheyenne	Cheyenne #4–25	25 issues	Ongoing series	August–October 1957 – January 1962		Dell Comics		No
Chip 'n Dale: Rescue Rangers	Chip 'n Dale: Rescue Rangers (1990)	19 issues	Ongoing series	June 1990 – December 1991		Disney Comics		
Chip 'n Dale: Rescue Rangers	Disney Adventures (volume 1) #1, #5, #8, #10		Comic story, ongoing series	August 1991		Disney Publishing Worldwide	Self-contained stories spanning several issues, the following stories in order: "The Cheez-o Cheaters – Chapter One: The Robbery That Wasn't" (#1), "The Cheez-o Cheaters – Chapter Two: Vat's Enough" (#1), "Gone with the Breeze" (#5), "Home Wreckers" (#8), "Meaner Than a Junkyard Cat (#10).	
Chip 'n Dale: Rescue Rangers	Disney Adventures (volume 2) #4, #11		Comic story, ongoing series	February 1992, September 1992		Disney Publishing Worldwide	Self-contained stories spanning several issues, the following stories in order: "His Honor, Fat Cat" (#4), "Phantom of the Orpheum" (#11).	
Chip 'n Dale: Rescue Rangers	Disney Adventures (volume 4)		Comic story, ongoing series	January 1994		Disney Publishing Worldwide	Self-contained stories spanning several issues, the following stories in order: "Blackout" (#3).	
Chip 'n Dale: Rescue Rangers	Chip 'n Dale: Rescue Rangers (2010)	8 issues	Limited series	September 2010 – May 2011		Boom! Studios		
The Chosen	The Chosen	2 volumes	Graphic novels	November – December 2021	Ryan Swanson, Tyler Thompson, Dallas Jenkins	Corvus Comics		
Chuck	Chuck	6 issues	Limited series	August 2008 – January 2009	Peter Johnson, Zev Barow, Scott Rosenbaum	WildStorm		
Cimarron Strip	Cimarron Strip	1 issue	Ongoing series (planned)	January 1968		Dell Comics		No
Circus Boy	Four Color (series 2) #759, #785, #813	3 issues	One-shot	December 1956, April 1957, July 1957	?	Dell Comics		No
Clarence	Clarence	4 issues	Limited series	June – September 2015	Liz Prince, Derek Fridolfs	Boom! Studios		
Clarence	Clarence: Rest Stops	1 issue	One-shot	December 2015	Patrick Crotty, Mad Rupert, Nick Cron-Devico, Scott Maynard, Kevin Panetta and Derek Fridolfs	Boom! Studios		
Clarence	Clarence: Chicken Phantom	1 volume	Graphic novel	May 2016	Derek Fridolfs	Boom! Studios		
Clarence	Clarence: Quest	1 issue	One-shot	June 2016	Nick Cron-DeVico	Boom! Studios		
Clarence	Clarence: Getting Gilben	1 volume	Graphic novel	April 2017	Derek Fridolfs	Boom! Studios		
Clue Club	Hanna-Barbera TV Stars #2, #4	2 issues	Comic story	Marvel Comics	Sharmon DiVono (#2), Reg Everbest (#4)	October 1978, February 1979	Two self-contained stories spanning two issues apart, the following stories in order: "Mrs. Macree's Mystery" (#2) and "The Root of All Evil" (#4).	No
Cobra Kai	Cobra Kai: The Karate Kid Saga Continues	3 issue	Limited series	October 2019 – January 2020	Denton J. Tipton	Boom! Studios		
Codename: Kids Next Door:	Cartoon Cartoons #14, #21, #26, #28, #30, #32, #33	7 issues	Comic story, ongoing series	January 2003, October 2003, March 2004, May 2004, July 2004, September 2004, October 2004		DC Comics	Eight self-contained stories spanning seven select issues, the following stories in order: the first untitled story (#14), "Operation: A.I.R.P.L.A.N.E." (#21), "Operation: G.R.A.N.D.A.D." (#26), "Operation: S.O.D.A." (#28), "Operation: M.E.S.S.A.G.E." (#30), "K.N.D. v. T.D.C.F.D.T.L." (#32), "Operation: I.C.E.D. T.E.E." (#32) and "Operation: F.A.N.G.S." (#33).	
Codename: Kids Next Door:	Cartoon Network Block Party #1, #2, #5, #8, #10, #12, #14, #18	8 issues	Comic story, ongoing series	November 2004, December 2004, March 2005, June 2005, August 2005, October 2005, December 2005, April 2006		DC Comics	Self-contained stories spanning eight select issues, the following stories in order: "D.E.A.D.L.I.N.E." (#1), "Operation: S.C.O.U.T.S." (#2), "Operation: M.E.A.T.B.A.L.L." (#5), "Operation: S.N.O.W.G.L.O.B.E." (#8), "Operation: B.A.K.E.D." (#10), "Operation: B.R.O.I.L.E.D." (#10), "Operation: D.I.P.P.E.D." (#10), "Operation: S.T.I.N.G.E.R." (#12), "Operation: C.H.O.C.O.-L.O.G." (#14), "Operation: P.R.E.-C.R.I.M.E." (#18).	
Codename: Kids Next Door:	Cartoon Network Action Pack! #2, #3, #6, #7, #8, #10, #12, #13, #14, #16, #17, #19, #21, #25, #26, #28	16 issues	Comic story, ongoing series	August 2006, September 2006, December 2006, January 2007, February 2007, April 2007, June 2007, July 2007, August 2007, October 2007, November 2007, January 2008, March 2008, July 2008, September 2008, October 2008		DC Comics	Self-contained stories spanning sixteen select issues, the following stories in order: the first untitled story (#2), "Operation: T.R.I.K.E." (#3), "Operation: M.A.T.H." (#6), "Operation: H.O.P." (#7), "Operation: S.K.I.P." (#7), "Operation: J.J.U.M.P." (#7), "Operation: H.A.I.R.C.U.T." (#8), "Operation: K.N.O.C.K." (#10), "Operation: S.O.C.K." (#10), "Operation: B.A.R.R.E.L." (#10), "Operation: G.A.M.E.O.V.U.H." (#12), "Operation: T.O.O.T.H.F.A.I.R.Y." (#13), "Operation: T.R.A.D.E." (#14), "Operation: O.V.E.R.F.L.O.W." (#16), "Operation: K.N.I.G.H.T.S." (#17), "Operation: H.I.S.T.O.R.I.E." (#19) "Operation: S.T.A.T.I.K." (#21), "Operation: S.M.U.G.G.L.E." (#21), "Operation: S.T.R.I.K.E." (#25), "Operation: C.H.I.N.A." (#26) and "Operation: I.M.P.R.O.V.E." (#28).	
Codename: Kids Next Door:	Super Secret Crisis War!: Codename: Kids Next Door	1 issue	One-shot	November 2014	Scott Peterson	IDW Publishing	Super Secret Crisis War! tie-in.	
The Colossal Show	The Colossal Show	1 issue	One-shot	1969		Gold Key Comics		No
Colt .45	Four Color (series 2) #924, #1004, #1058	9 issues	One-shot	August 1958, June–August 1959, November 1959-January 1960		Dell Comics		No
Colt .45	Colt .45 #4–9	9 issues	Ongoing series	February 1963 – June 1961		Gold Key Comics		No
COPS	COPS	15 issues	Ongoing series	August 1988 – August 1989	Doug Moench	DC Comics		
Count Duckula	Count Duckula	15 issues	Ongoing series	November 1988 – January 1990		Marvel Comics		
Courage the Cowardly Dog	Cartoon Cartoons #1, #4, #5, #7, #9, #11, #16, #19, #20, #22, #23, #25, #28, #29, #31	15 issues	Comic story, ongoing series	March 2001, June 2001, July 2001, November 2001, March 2002, July 2002, May 2003, August 2003, September 2003, November 2003, December 2003, February 2004, May 2004, June 2004, August 2004		DC Comics	Fifteen self-contained stories spanning select issues, the following stories in order: "The Gods Must Be Nosy" (#1), "The Purr-Fect Demon" (#4), "Scream a Little Dream" (#5), "Blood Testy" (#7), "Stray Cheese" (#9), "Vegan Invasion" (#11), "Virus!" (#16), "A Tree Grows in Nowhere" (#19), "Mummy's the Word" (#20), "Out of This World" (#22), "Tin Machine" (#23), "Invasion of the Booty Snatchers" (#25), "Small Problem" (#28), "Boo-om Box" (#29) and "Running in Crop Circles" (#31).	
Courage the Cowardly Dog	Cartoon Network Block Party! #1, #2, #4, #5, #6, #7, #10, #11, #13, #15, #17, #18, #19, #22, #30, #33	16 issues	Comic story, ongoing series	November 2004, December 2004, February 2005, March 2005, April 2005, May 2005, August 2005, September 2005, November 2005, January 2006, March 2006, April 2006, May 2006, August 2006, April 2007, May 2007		DC Comics	Sixteen self-contained stories spanning select issues, the following stories in order: "Hide & Shriek" (#1), "Puzzling Evidence" (#2), "Drool in the Gene Pool" (#4), "The Farm Hand Gets the Book" (#5), "Death Comes A-Waggin" (#6), "The Titanium Chef" (#7), "Get a Grip" (#10), "Screaming Ice Cream" (#11), "Psyche Out" (#13), "Turn Up the Missing Turnip" (#15), "The Writing on the Wall" (#17), "Wedding of the Living Dead" (#18), "Pulling for the Bad Guys" (#19), "Monster Trucks" (#22), "Pete Pied Piper" (#30) and "Blueberry Muffin of Doom!" (#33).	
The Courtship of Eddie's Father	The Courtship of Eddie's Father	2 issues	Ongoing series		Gold Key Comics	January – May 1970		No
Cow and Chicken	Cartoon Network Presents #6, #10, #14, #19	4 issues	Comic story, ongoing series	January 1998, May 1998, October 1998, March 1999		DC Comics	Seven self-contained stories spanning four select issues, the following stories in order: "Recycling Daze" (#6), "Mayhem on the Midway" (#10), "S'Cool Buzz Blues" (#14), "Curse of the Platypus Paw" (#14), "Son of the Beach!" (#19), "Little Jar" (#19) and "Attack of the 50-Foot Chicken!" (#19).	
Cow and Chicken	Cartoon Network Starring #3, #7, #10, #13, #16	5 issues	Comic story, ongoing series	November 1999, March 2000, June 2000, September 2000, December 2000		DC Comics	Eleven self-contained stories spanning five select issues, the following stories in order: "Abusement Park" (#3), "All Groan Up" (#3), "Udder Perfection" (#7), "Baby-Sitting the Bovine" (#7), "Gorilla Scouts!" (#10), "Poultry-Geist" (#10), "Grin and Merit!" (#10), "Weak in the Sneeze" (#13), "Flaming Desire!" (#13), "Two Dips in the Ocean" (#16) and "The X-Ray Files" (#16).	
Cow and Chicken	Cartoon Cartoons #2, #17, #18, #21, #24, #27, #31	7 issues	Comic story, ongoing series	April 2001, June 2003, July 2003, October 2003, January 2004, April 2004, August 2004		DC Comics	Seven self-contained stories spanning select issues, the following stories in order: "Chicken and the Beanstalk" (#2), "Everybody Was Robot-Fightin'!" (#17), "World of Cheese" (#18), "Down the Drain" (#21), "X Marks da Spot" (#24), "Library Cad" (#27) and "The Long, Long Trip Home" (#31).	
Cow and Chicken	Super Secret Crisis War!: Cow and Chicken	1 issue	One-shot	October 2014	Louise Simonson, Jim Zub	IDW Publishing	Super Secret Crisis War! tie-in.	
Cowboy Bebop	Cowboy Bebop: Shooting Star	12 chapters	Serialized manga	September 18, 1997 – June 18, 1998	Cain Kuga	Kadokawa Shoten	Serialized in Monthly Asuka Fantasy DX.	Collected in 2 tankōbon volumes.
Cowboy Bebop	Cowboy Bebop	12 chapters	Serialized manga	October 18, 1998 – February 18, 2000	Yutaka Nanten	Kadokawa Shoten	Serialized in Monthly Asuka Fantasy DX.	Collected in 3 tankōbon volumes.
Cowboy Bebop (2021)	Cowboy Bebop	4 issues	Limited series	February – July 2022	Dan Watters	Titan Comics		
Cowboy in Africa	Cowboy in Africa	1 issue	One-shot	March 1968		Gold Key Comics		No
Crusader Rabbit	Four Color (series 2) #735, #805	2 issues	One-shot	1956, 1957		Dell Comics		No
CSI (comics)	CSI: Crime Scene Investigation	5 issues	Limited series	January – May 2003	Max Allan Collins, Ashley Wood, Gabriel Rodriguez	IDW Publishing		

== D ==
Based on	Title	Length	Format	Publication date	Authors	Publisher	Notes	Collected editions
Dad's Army	TV Comic #1058–1100	92 issues	Comic story, serial	March 25, 1972 – January 13, 1973		Polystyle Publications		
Danger Man	Four Color (series 2) #1231	1 issue	One-shot	September–November 1961	?	Dell Comics	The main feature story "Murder on the Midway" (32 pages), plus an introductionary page, a one-page text article "Actors or Killers" and a back cover illustration of NATO, represented by the flags of the fifteen nations.	No
Danger Man	Secret Agent	2 issues	Ongoing series	November 1966 – January 1968	Dick Wood	Gold Key Comics		No
Danger Mouse (1981)	Look-in #???–???		Comic story, serial	March 1982 – November 1985, September 1986 – 1989	Angus P. Allan	ITV		
Daniel Boone (1964)	Daniel Boone	15 issues	Ongoing series	January 1965 – April 1969	Fred Fredericks, Paul S. Newman	Gold Key Comics		No
The Danny Thomas Show	Four Color (series 2) #1180, #1249	2 issues	One-shoy	April–June 1961, November 1961-January 1962	Eric Freiwald, Robert Schaefer	Dell Comics		No
The Dark Crystal: Age of Resistance	The Dark Crystal: Age of Resistance	12 issues	Limited series	September 2019 – October 2020	Nicole Andelfinger	Archaia Entertainment		The Complete Collection HC (160886118X/9781608861187)
Dark Shadows	Dark Shadows (1968)	35 issues	Ongoing series	March 1968 – February 1976		Gold Key Comics		
Dark Shadows	Dark Shadows/Vampirella	5 issues	Limited series	July – December 2012	Marc Andreyko	Dynamite Entertainment	Crossover with Vampirella.	
Dark Shadows	Dark Shadows: Year One	6 issues	Limited series	April – September 2013	Marc Andreyko	Dynamite Entertainment		
Darkwing Duck	Darkwing Duck (1991)	4 issues	Limited series	November 1991	John Blair Moore	Disney Comics		
Darkwing Duck	Darkwing Duck (2010)	18 issues	Ongoing series	June 2010 – October 2011	Ian Brill	Boom! Studios	The final two issues of this run, "Dangerous Currency" parts two and four, for a crossover storyline with DuckTales whose then-recent series was also being published at the time.	
Darkwing Duck	Darkwing Duck (2016)	8 issues	Ongoing series	April 2016 – February 2017	Aaron Sparrow	Joe Books Ltd		
Darkwing Duck	Darkwing Duck (2023)	10 issues	Original series	January – November 2023	Amanda Deibert	Dynamite Entertainment		
Darkwing Duck	Darkwing Duck: Negaduck	8 issues	Limited series	September 2023 – September 2024	Jeff Parker	Dynamite Entertainment		
DC Animated Universe	Main article: DC Animated Universe (comics)							
Defenders of the Earth	Defenders of the Earth	4 issues	Limited series	January – July 1987	Stan Lee, Bob Harras, Michael Higgins, Alex Saviuk	Star Comics		No
The Deputy	Four Color (series 2) #1077, #1130, #1225	3 issues	One-shot	February–April 1960, September–November 1960, October–December 1961	Paul S. Newman	Dell Comics		No
Deputy Dawg	Four Color (series 2) #1238, #1299	2 issues	One-shot	October–December 1961, April–June 1962	John Stanley	Dell Comics		No
Dexter	Dexter	5 issues	Limited series	September 2013 – January 2014	Jeff Lindsay	Marvel Comics		
Dexter	Dexter Down Under	5 issues	Limited series	April – August 2014	Jeff Lindsay	Marvel Comics		
Dexter's Laboratory	Cartoon Network Presents #1, #4	2 issues	Comic story	John F. Kelly (#1), Genndy Tartakovsky (#4), Paul Rudish (#4)	DC Comics	August 1997, November 1997	The latter issue is an adaptation of the secondary segment "Dial M for Monkey: Peltra" from Season 2, Episode 20 of the series (aired November 26, 1997).	
Dexter's Laboratory	Dexter's Laboratory (1999)	34 issues	Ongoing series	September 1999 – April 2003	DC Comics			
Dexter's Laboratory	Dexter's Laboratory: Knights of the Periodic Table	1 issue	One-shot	2003	DC Comics	Bobbi Jo, David Cody Weiss		
Dexter's Laboratory	Cartoon Cartoons #17, #18, #19, #21, #23, #25, #27, #28, #29, #30, #32, #33	12 issues	Comic story, ongoing series	Robbie Busch (#17, #19, #23, #25, #27, #32, #33), Bobbi Weiss (#18), Scott Cunningham (#21), John Rozum (#28), Scott Roberts (#29), Charlie Boatner (#30)	DC Comics	June 2003, July 2003, August 2003, October 2003, December 2003, February 2004, April 2004, May 2004, June 2004, July 2004, September 2004, October 2004	Dexter's Laboratory moved into this title as a regular feature following the cancellation of the ongoing series run in April 2003; twelve stories spanned in twelve issues apart; the following stories in order: "Training Wheel Day" (#17), "Lockout!" (#18), "Mr. Fun Guy" (#19), "Unsightly Mole", (#21), "Sunken Leisure", (#23), "Dancing Fool" (#25) "Super Cereal" (#27), "The Amazing Race" (#28), "Farmer in the Lab" (#29), "Do or Dye" (#30), "Fizzy Whiz" (#32) and "Dex-O-Vision" (#33).	
Dexter's Laboratory	Dexter's Laboratory (2014)	4 issues	Limited series	April – July 2014	DC Comics	Derek Fridolfs	IDW Publishing	Dexter's Laboratory: Dee's Day TP:1631400495/9781631400490
Digimon Adventure	Digimon: Digital Monsters	#1–12	Limited series	May – November 2000		Dark Horse Comics	Adaptation of the first thirteen episodes of the series.	No
Dinosaucers	Dinosaucers	5 issues	Limited series	August 2018 – January 2019	Michael Uslan	Lion Forge Comics		Vol. 1: Reptilon TP: 1941302998/9781941302996
Dinosaurs	Dinosaurs	2 issues	Ongoing series	1992 – 1993		Hollywood Comics		No
Disenchantment	Disenchantment: Untold Tales	2 volumes	Graphic novels	November 14, 2023	Matt Groening	Titan Comics		Vol. 1: Treasury the First HC: 1787741575/9781787741577
Disenchantment	Disenchantment: Untold Tales	2 volumes	Graphic novels	June 25, 2024	Matt Groening	Titan Comics		Vol. 2: Treasury the Second HC: 1787741583/9781787741584
The Disney Afternoon	The Disney Afternoon	10 issues	Ongoing series	November 1994 – August 1995	John Blair Moore, Roger Brown, Janet Gilbert, Brian Swenlin, David Seidman, Roger Brown, Paul S. Newman, Doug Murray, Bobbi J.G. Weiss, Jerry Novick, Russ Miller, Steve Sullivan	Marvel Comics		
The Disney Afternoon	Disney Afternoon Giant	8 issues	Ongoing series	October 2018 – December 2019	Warren Spector (#1–4), Ian Brill (#1–8)	IDW Publishing		
Disney anthology television series	Four Color (series 2) #631, #639, #664, #671	4 issues	One-shot	May 1954, July 1955, November 1955, December 1955	Paul S. Newman (#639, #671)	Dell Comics	All four issues related to the Davy Crockett miniseries that aired in five parts through seasons 1 and 2 of the series (episodes 8, 14, 18, 31 and 34, all respectively aired December 15, 1954 – December 14, 1955); the main feature story of the first issue (#631), "Davy Crockett, Indian Fighter" (32 pages), plus an introductionary page, a one-page text article "The Creek Warrior" and a back cover illustration depicting the Creek Indian Territory. The remaining three issues' respective main features, "Davy Crockett at the Alamo" (#639), "Davy Crockett in The Great Keelboat Race" (#664), "Davy Crockett and the River Pirates" (#671), all run through a total of 34 pages each.	
Disney anthology television series	Walt Disney's Davy Crockett: King of the Wild Frontier	1 issue	One-shot	September 1955	?	Dell Comics	Related to the Davy Crockett miniseries; the comic four self-contained stories centering on Davy Crockett, "Young Davy Crockett" (14 pages), "Cherokee Justice" (20 pages), "Davy Crockett Goes to Washington" (10 pages), and "Davy Crockett and Ol' Three Claws" (14 pages), four four page back-up stories relating James Bowie, John Colter, Kit Carson and Daniel Boone, text articles centering on facts, "Survival in the Wilds" (3 pages), "Pioneer Transportation" (3 pages), "The Fall of the Alamo" (3 pages) and "Pioneer Pastimes" (2 pages), a two page activity, "Name the States ", and a back cover pin-up illustration of Fess Parker as Davy Crockett; part of Dell Giant comic book line.	No
Disney anthology television series	Four Color (series 2) #716: "Man in Space"	7 issues	One-shot	August 1956	Don R. Christensen	Dell Comics	Main feature adapted from season 1, episode 20 of the series (aired September 19, 1956); 18 pages total.	No
Disney anthology television series	Four Color (series 2) #716: "The Great Cat Family"	7 issues	One-shot	November 1956	?	Dell Comics	Main feature adapted from season 3, episode 2 of the series (aired September 19, 1956); 18 pages total.	No
Disney anthology television series	Four Color (series 2) #865: "Andy Burnett"	7 issues	One-shot	December 1957	?	Dell Comics	Main feature adapted from The Saga of Andy Burnett, a six-part miniseries that aired in two halves through season 4 of the series (episodes 77, 78, 79, 92, 93 and 94, all respectively aired October 2, 1957 – March 12, 1958); 32 pages total.	No
Disney anthology television series	Four Color (series 2) #866: "Mars and Beyond"	7 issues	One-shot	December 1957	Don R. Christensen	Dell Comics	Main feature adapted from season 4, episode 12 of the series (aired December 4, 1957); 32 pages total.	No
Disney anthology television series	Four Color (series 2) #954: "Man in Space: Satellites"	7 issues	One-shot	February 1959	Don R. Christensen	Dell Comics	Continuation of "Man in Space" from #716; the main feature story "Satellites" (32 pages) and three one-page fillers "Launching the Earth Satellites", "Rocket Missiles" and a reprint of "Man in Space".	No
Disney anthology television series	Four Color (series 2) #997, #1181: "Texas John Slaughter"	7 issues	One-shot	June–August 1959, April–June 1961	Robert Schaefer	Dell Comics	Main feature adapted from the eponymous seventeen-part miniseries that aired through seasons 5 and 7 of the series (episodes 104, 106, 112, 114, 120, 122, 135, 136, 137, 144, 145, 146, 147, 165, 166, 174, 175, all respectively aired October 31, 1958 – April 23, 1961).	No
Disney anthology television series	Four Color (series 2) #997: "The Nine Lives of Elfego Baca"	7 issues	One-shot	July 1959	?	Dell Comics	Main feature adapted from the eponymous ten-part miniseries that aired through seasons 5 and 6 of the series (episodes 100, 102, 104, 106, 108, 110, 116, 118, 132, 133, 149, 150, all respectively aired October 3, 1958 – March 25, 1960); 16 pages total.	No
Disney anthology television series	Walt Disney Presents #2–6	5 issues	Ongoing series	December 1959-February 1960 – December–February 1961		Dell Comics	Continued from Four Color (series 2) #997; further original stories based on The Swamp Fox The Nine Lives of Elfego Baca and Texas John Slaughter (from #3) respectively.	No
Disney anthology television series	Four Color (series 2) #1109: "This Is Your Life, Donald Duck"	4 issues	One-shot	August–October 1960	?	Dell Comics	Main feature adapted from season 6, episode 23 of the series (aired March 11, 1960); 32 pages total.	No
Disney anthology television series	Four Color (series 2) #1179: "The Swamp Fox"	4 issues	One-shot	March–May 1961	?	Dell Comics	Main feature adapted from the eponymous eight-part miniseries that aired through seasons 6 and 7 of the series (episodes 129, 130, 138, 139, 140, 141, 162 and 163, all respectively aired October 23, 1959 – January 16, 1961).	No
Disney anthology television series	Four Color (series 2) #1260: "The Horsemasters"	4 issues	One-shot	December 1961-February 1962	?	Dell Comics	Adaptation of the eponymous two-part film which aired through season 8 of the series (episodes 183–184, aired October 1 – 8, 1961).	No
Disney anthology television series	Four Color (series 2) #1273: "Hans Brinker"	4 issues	One-shot	March–May 1962	?	Dell Comics	Adaptation of the eponymous two-part film which aired through season 8 of the series (episodes 194–195, aired January 7 – 14, 1962).	No
Disney anthology television series	Dell Movie Classics #01-654-207: "The Prince and the Pauper"	1 issue	One-shot	May–July 1962	?	Dell Comics	Adaptation of the eponymous three-part miniseries which aired through season 8 of the series (episodes 202–204, aired March 11 – 25, 1962).	No
Disney anthology television series	Walt Disney's Escapade in Florence	1 issue	One-shot	January 1963	?	Gold Key Comics	Adaptation of the eponymous two-part film which aired through season 9 of the series (episodes 209–210, aired September 30 – October 7, 1962).	No
Disney anthology television series	Walt Disney's World of Adventure #1, #2	2 issues	Comic story	April 1963, July 1963	?	Gold Key Comics	Issue #1 is an adaptation of Mooncussers (episodes 217–218, aired December 2 – 9, 1962); issue #2 is an adaptation of Johnny Shiloh (episodes 223–224, aired January 20 – 27, 1963); both respective two-part films aired through season 9 of the series.	No
Disney anthology television series	Walt Disney's The Horse Without a Head	1 issue	One-shot	January 1964	?	Gold Key Comics	Adaptation of the eponymous two-part film which aired through season 9 of the series (episodes 233–234, aired September 29 – October 6, 1963); 22 pages total.	No
Disney anthology television series	Walt Disney's The Scarecrow of Romney Marsh	3 issues	Ongoing series	April 1964 – October 1965	?	Gold Key Comics	Issue #1 is an adaptation of the eponymous three-part miniseries which aired through season 10 of the series (episodes 250–252, aired February 9 – 23, 1964), the remaining two issues feature original stories.	No
Disney anthology television series	Walt Disney's Gallegher, Boy Reporter	1 issue	One-shot	May 1965	?	Gold Key Comics	Adaptation of the eponymous three-part miniseries which aired through season 11 of the series (episodes 276–278, aired January 24 – February 7, 1965); 22 pages total.	No
Disney anthology television series	Walt Disney's The Legend of Young Dick Turpin	1 issue	One-shot	May 1966	Paul S. Newman	Gold Key Comics	Adaptation of the eponymous three-part miniseries which aired through season 12 of the series (episodes 302–303, aired February 13 – 20, 1966); 32 pages total.	No
Diver Dan	Four Color (series 2) #1254	1 issue	One-shot	February–April 1962		Dell Comics		No
Diver Dan	Diver Dan #2	1 issue	Ongoing series (planned)	June–August 1962	Paul C. Ignizio	Dell Comics		No
Doctor Who (Polystyle comic strip) (List)	TV Comic #674–999	326 issues	Comic story, serial	November 14, 1964 – February 6, 1971		Polystyle Publications		
Doctor Who (Polystyle comic strip) (List)	Doctor Who Magazine	600 issues	Ongoing series	October 17, 1979 – present	Various	Marvel UK (1979–1975), Panini Comics (1995–present)		
Doctor Who (Polystyle comic strip) (List)	Doctor Who Adventures	385 issues	Ongoing series	April 5, 2006 – June 22, 2017	Various	Panini Comics		
Dollhouse	Dollhouse: Epitaphs	6 issues	Limited series	March – November 2011	Jed Whedon, Maurissa Tancharoen, Andrew Chambliss	Dark Horse Comics	Five regular issues and an issue #0.	
Dr. Kildare	Four Color (series 2) #1337	1 issue	One-shot	April–June 1962	?	Dell Comics		No
Dr. Kildare	Dr. Kildare #2—9	8 issues	Limited series	July–September 1962 – April–June 1965		Dell Comics		No
Dr. Zitbag's Transylvania Pet Shop	Buster ???–???		Comic story, ongoing series	September 1994 – November 1996		Fleetway/Egmont UK		
Duckman	Duckman	5 issues	Ongoing series	November 1994 – May 1995	Stefan Petrucha	Topps Comics		No
Duckman	Duckman: The Mob Frog Saga	3 issues	Limited series	November 1994 – February 1995	Stefan Petrucha	Topps Comics		No
DuckTales (1987)	DuckTales (1988)	13 issues	Ongoing series	October 1988 – May 1990	Larry Gotterer, Jim Fanning, Frank Ridgeway, Byron Erickson, William Van Horn, Gary Leach, John Lustig, Dwight Decker	Gladstone Publishing		
DuckTales (1987)	DuckTales (1990)	18 issues	Ongoing series	June 1990 – November 1991	Marv Wolfman, Frank Ridgeway, Vic Lockman, Bob Langhans	Disney Comics		
DuckTales (1987)	DuckTales the Movie: Treasure of the Lost Lamp	1 volume	Graphic novel	Summer 1990	John Lustig	W.D. Publications, Inc.	Adaptation of the spin-off feature film.	Paperback: ISBN 1-56115-048-7 / ISBN 978-1-56115-048-9
DuckTales (1987)	DuckTales (2011)	6 issues	Ongoing series	May – October 2011	Warren Spector	Kaboom!	The final two issues of this run, "Dangerous Currency" parts one and three, form a crossover storyline with Darkwing Duck whose then-recent series was also being published at the time.	
DuckTales (2017)	DuckTales (2017)	21 issues	Ongoing series	July 2017 – April 2019	Joe Caramagna, Joey Cavaleri, Steve Behling, Alessandro Ferrari,	IDW Publishing	20 regular issues and an issue #0.	
DuckTales (2017)	DuckTales: Faires and Scares	3 issues	Limited series	December 2019 – February 2020	Steve Behling, Joe Caramagna	IDW Publishing		
DuckTales (2017)	DuckTales: Silence and Science	3 issues	Limited series	August – October 2019	Steve Behling	IDW Publishing		
Dynomutt, Dog Wonder	Scooby-Doo #1–5, #7	6 issues	Back-up story	October 1977, December 1977, February 1978, April 1978, June 1978, October 1978	Mark Evanier (#1–5), Don R. Christensen (#7)	Marvel Comics	The Blue Falcon and Dynomutt were both featured in back-up stories spanning six issues apart; the following stories in order: "Goody Twoshoes" (#1), "The Sinister Threat" (#2), "Time to Bee-Ware!" (#3), "The Big Bust-Out" (#4), "Two Dog Town" (#5) and "Dynomutt's Energy Mystery" (#7), each run through either three pages (#2, #4) or two pages (#5, #7).	No
Dynomutt, Dog Wonder	Hanna-Barbera's Dynomutt	6 issues	Ongoing series	November 1977 – September 1978	Mark Evanier	Marvel Comics	Storylines from Scooby-Doo #2 and #4 continued in #2 and #4 of this series.	No
Dynomutt, Dog Wonder	The Funtastic World of Hanna-Barbera #2: "Phantasma Gloria"	1 issue	Back-up story	January 1978	Mark Evanier	Marvel Comics	Guest-featuring Scooby-Doo and the Mystery Inc. Gang; eight pages total.	No
Dynomutt, Dog Wonder	Cartoon Network Presents #21: "Cat on a Hot Tin Pooch"	1 issue	Comic story	May 1999	Dan Slott	DC Comics	Main feature runs through a total of ten pages.	No
Dynomutt, Dog Wonder	Scooby-Doo Team-Up #38: "It Was a Dark and Gritty Knight..."	1 issue	Comic story	March 23, 2018, July 2018 (cover date)	Sholly Fisch	DC Comics		
Dynomutt, Dog Wonder	Super Sons/Dynomutt and the Blue Falcon Special	1 issue	One-shot	Peter J. Tomasi	March 30, 2018, July 2018 (cover date)	DC Comics	Crossover with DC's Super-Sons; part of the DC Meets Hanna-Barbera comic book line.	

== E ==
Based on	Title	Length	Format	Publication date	Authors	Publisher	Notes	Collected editions
El Chavo								
El Chapulín Colorado								
The Electric Company	Spidey Super Stories	57 issues	Ongoing series	October 1974 – March 1982	Bill Effros, Jean Thomas, Tom Whedon, Byron Preiss, John Boni, Jim Salicrup, Pat Thackray, Larry Lieber, Kolfax Mingo, Janet Gari, Nick Cuti, Ralph Macchio, D. Jon Zimmerman, Elliot Maggin, Bobo De L'air, Karas, Julie Mishkin, Bill Mantlo, Deborah November, Michael Siporin, Nick Sullivan, Sharon L. Webber, Alan Kupperberg, Steve Grant, Duncan Seafil	Marvel Comics		No
Elvira's Movie Macabre	Elvira's House of Mystery	11 issues	Ongoing series	January 1986 – January 1987		DC Comics		
Elvira's Movie Macabre	Elvira's Haunted Holidays	1 issue	One-shot	January 1987	Joey Cavalieri, Michael Fleisher, Barbara Randall, Ed Hannigan	DC Comics		
Elvira's Movie Macabre	Elvira, Mistress of the Dark (1993)	166 issues	Ongoing series	May 1993 – February 2007		Claypool Comics		
Elvira's Movie Macabre	The Shape of Elvira	4 issues	Limited series	January 2018 – December 2019	David Avallone	Dynamite Entertainment		
Elvira's Movie Macabre	Elvira, Mistress of the Dark (2018)	12 issues	Limited series	July 2018 – February 2020	David Avallone	Dynamite Entertainment		
Elvira's Movie Macabre	Elvira, Mistress of the Dark Spring Special	1 issue	One-shot	May 2019	Dan Parent, Fernando Ruiz, Scott Bryan Wilson	Dynamite Entertainment		
Elvira's Movie Macabre	Elvira Meets Vincent Price	5 issues	Limited series	August 2021 – March 2022	David Avallone	Dynamite Entertainment		
Elvira's Movie Macabre	Elvira in Horrorland	5 issues	Limited series	May – December 2022	David Avallone	Dynamite Entertainment		
Emergency!	Emergency!	4 issues	Limited series	June – December 1976	Joe Gill	Charlton Comics		No
Eureka (2006)	Eureka	4 issues	Limited series	December 2008 – March 2009	Andrew Cosby, Brendan Hay	Boom! Studios		TPB
Eureka (2006)	Eureka: Dormant Gene	4 issues	Limited series	Apr 2009 – Jul 2009	Andrew Cosby, Jonathan L. Davis	Boom! Studios		TPB
The Expanse	The Expanse	4 issues	Limited series	December 2020 – March 2021	Corinna Bechko	Boom! Studios		
The Expanse	The Expanse: Dragon Tooth	12 issues	Limited series	April 2023 – May 2024	Andy Diggle	Boom! Studios		

== F ==
Based on	Title	Length	Format	Publication date	Authors	Publisher	Notes	Collected editions
Falling Skies	Falling Skies	1 volume	Graphic novel	June 2011	Paul Tobin	Dark Horse Comics		
Falling Skies	Falling Skies: The Battle of Fitchburg	1 volume	Graphic novel	October 2012	Paul Tobin	Dark Horse Comics		
Family Affair	Family Affair	4 issues	Ongoing series	January – October 1970		Gold Key Comics		
Fantastic Voyage	Fantastic Voyage	2 issues	Ongoing series	August – December 1969		Gold Key Comics		
Farscape	Farscape: War Torn	2 issues	Limited series	April – May 2002	Marv Wolfman	WildStorm		
Farscape	Farscape (series 1)	4 issues	Limited series	November 2008 – February 2009	Rockne O'Bannon, Keith R.A. DeCandido, Tommy Patterson	Boom! Studios		
Farscape	Farscape: Strange Detractors	4 issues	Limited series	March – June 2009	Rockne S. O'Bannon, Keith R.A. DeCandido	Boom! Studios		
Farscape	Farscape: D'Argo's Lament	4 issues	Limited series	April – July 2009	Keith R.A. DeCandido	Boom! Studios		
Farscape	Farscape: Gone and Back	4 issues	Limited series	July – October 2009	Rockne S. O'Bannon, Keith R.A. DeCandido	Boom! Studios		
Farscape	Farscape: D'Argo's Trial	4 issues	Limited series	August – November 2009	Keith R.A. DeCandido	Boom! Studios		
Farscape	Farscape (series 2)	24 issues	Ongoing series	November 2009 – October 2011	Rockne S. O'Bannon, Keith R.A. DeCandido	Boom! Studios		
Farscape	Farscape: D'Argo's Quest	4 issues	Limited series	December 2009 – March 2010	Keith R.A. DeCandido	Boom! Studios		
Farscape	Farscape: Scorpius	8 issues	Limited series	April – November 2010	Rockne S. O'Bannon, David Alan Mack	Boom! Studios		
Fat Albert and the Cosby Kids	Fat Albert and the Cosby Kids	29 issues	Ongoing series	March 1974 – February 1979		Gold Key Comics		No
Fireball XL5	TV Comic #565–705	140 issues	Comic story, serial	1962 – 1964		Polystyle Publications		
Fireball XL5	Steve Zodiac and the Fireball XL5	1 issue	One-shot	December 1963		Gold Key Comics		
Fireball XL5	TV Century 21 #1–174	174 issues	Comic story, serial	January 23, 1965 – May 18, 1968	Tod Sullivan, Mike Noble	City Magazines		
Firefly (comics)	Firefly (2018)	36 issues	Ongoing series	November 2018 – January 2022	Greg Pak	Boom! Studios		
Firefly (comics)	Firefly: Bad Company	1 issue	One-shot	March 2019	Josh Lee Gordon	Boom! Studios		
Firefly (comics)	Firefly: The Sting	1 volume	Graphic novel	November 2019	Delilah S. Dawson	Boom! Studios		
Firefly (comics)	Firefly: The Outlaw Ma Reynolds	1 issue	One-shot	January 2020	Greg Pak	Boom! Studios		
Firefly (comics)	Firefly: Blue Sun Rising	2 issues	Limited series	September – December 2020	Greg Pak	Boom! Studios	Frame story of an event comic storyline, continued through issues #21–24 of the ongoing series and back again.	
Firefly (comics)	Firefly: Watch How I Soar	1 volume	Graphic novel	November 2020	Jeff Jensen, Ethan Young, Jared Cullum, Jorge Corona, and Giannis Milonogiannis	Boom! Studios		
Firefly (comics)	Firefly: Brand New 'Verse	#1	Limited series	March – August 2021	Josh Lee Gordon	Boom! Studios		
Firefly (comics)	Firefly: River Run	1 issue	One-shot	September 2021	David M. Booher	Boom! Studios		
Firefly (comics)	The Firefly Holiday Special	1 issue	One-shot	December 2021	Jeff Jensen	Boom! Studios		
Firefly (comics)	All New Firefly	10 issues	Limited series	February – November 2022	David M. Booher	Boom! Studios		
Firefly (comics)	Firefly: Keep Flying	1 issue	One-shot	November 2022	Jeff Jensen	Boom! Studios		
Firefly (comics)	All New Firefly: Big Damn Finale	1 issue	One-shot	David M. Booher	December 2022	Boom! Studios		
The Flash (1990)	The Flash TV Special	1 issue	One-shot	October 1991	John Byrne ("The Quick and the Dead"), Mark Waid ("Meet Kid Flash"), Robert Greenberger ("Behind the Scenes with the Flash")	DC Comics	The issue features two main stories: "The Quick and the Dead" and "Meet Kid Flash" (both run for a total of 25 pages), followed by a "Behind the Scenes with the Flash" feature (running for a total of 14 pages), and a five-page episode guide.	
The Flash (2014)	The Flash: Season Zero	12 issues	Limited series	December 2014 – November 2014	Andrew Kreisberg, Brooke Eikmeier, Katherine Walczak, Kai Yu Wu, Lauren Certo, Phil Hester, Ben Sokolowski, Sterling Gates	DC Comics		
The Flintstone Kids	The Flintstone Kids	11 issues	Ongoing series	August 1987 – April 1989	Michael Gallagher, Angelo DeCesare, Tony Franco, Laura Hitchcock	Marvel Comics/Star Comics		
The Flintstones (comics)
The Flintstones (comics)	Dell Giant #48: "The Flintstones: Bedrock Bedlam"	1 issue	One-shot	September 1961		Dell Comics	First issue of The Flintstones comic book series.	
The Flintstones (comics)	The Flintstones on the Rocks	1 issue	One-shot	September 1961		Dell Comics		
The Flintstones (comics)	The Flintstones (1961) #2–60	59 issues	One-shot	December 1961 – September 1970		Dell Comics, Gold Key Comics	The main series overall, continued from Dell Giant #48; the first six issues were published by Dell and the remainder of the series by Gold Key Comics from #7 (October 1962).	
The Flintstones (comics)	The Flintstones – Bigger and Boulder	1 issue	One-shot	November 1962		Gold Key Comics	The comic features 14 stories, 1 page The Flintstones story "A Flintstone Funny" (I) (1 page), "Bigger and Boulder" (10 page), "The Crystal Ball Game" (6 page), "For Land Sakes" (8 page), "Playing It Safe" (6 page), "Vase Makes Waste" (7 page), "To Beat, or Not To Beat" (2 page), "Beddy-Bye at Bedrock" (7 page), "Big Business" (6 page), "French Dressing" (6 page), "Beauty Parlor Panic" (6 page), "The Nightly Night Fight" (8 page), "Dodoes and Dreams" (8 page), "A Flintstone Funny" (II) (1 page), and a pin-up of the Flintstones and the Rubbles together; reprinted in June 1966.	
The Flintstones (comics)	Cave Kids	16 issues	Ongoing series	February 1963 – March 1967	Del Connell	Gold Key Comics	Spin-off; the comic guest-features various Hanna-Barbera characters throughout the series like Wally Gator (#1–3 and #5), Lippy the Lion and Hardy Har Har (#4), Yakky Doodle (#6–7), The Space Kidettes (#16) and Flintstones series regulars the Gruesomes (#8–15) and Pebbles and Bamm-Bamm (#12 and #14) as well as regular text stories from Ruff and Reddy, Loopy De Loop, Snagglepuss, Pixie and Dixie and Mr. Jinks and, from issue #5 onward, Augie Doggie and Doggie Daddy.	
The Flintstones (comics)	Pebbles Flintstone	1 issue	One-shot	September 1963		Gold Key Comics		
The Flintstones (comics)	The Flintstones at the New York World's Fair	1 issue	One-shot	1964		J.W. Books, a subsidiary of Warren Publishing Co.	The comic features four main stories: "The Lost Time I Saw Pebbles" (16 pages) The Flintstones story "Retriever Stay 'Way from My Door" (16 pages), "On the Job Straining" (16 pages), "That Was the Wreck That Was" (16 pages); the book also features two one-page fillers of World's Fair photographs with the characters sightseeing and a pin-up of the Flintstones and the Unisphere; guest-featuring multiple Hanna-Barbera characters throughout the book, originally published as an official souvenir of the 1964 New York World's Fair.	
The Flintstones (comics)	Bamm-Bamm and Pebbles Flintstone	1 issue	One-shot	October 1964		Gold Key Comics	The comic features seven main stories: "Vineway South" (1 page), "No Dough for the Show" (6 page), "Two for the Toys" (7 page), "The Average Son" (8 page), "One Tie All Tie" (6 page), "The Tiger Tale" (5 page), "Firebreathing dragon" (1 page).	
The Flintstones (comics)	The Flintstones and Pebbles	50 issues	Ongoing series	November 1970 – February 1977		Charlton Comics		
The Flintstones (comics)	The Flintstones Starring Dino	20 issues	Ongoing series	August 1973 – January 1977		Charlton Comics		
The Flintstones (comics)	Hanna-Barbera's The Flintstones	9 issues	Limited series	October 1977 – February 1979	Mark Evanier, Chase Craig	Marvel Comics		
The Flintstones (comics)	The Flintstones Christmas Party	1 issue	One-shot	December 1977	Mark Evanier	Marvel Comics		
The Flintstones (comics)	Blackthorne 3-D Series #19, 22, 36, 42: "The Flintstones 3-D"	4 issues	Limited series	April 1987 – February 1988	John Stephenson	Blackthorne Publishing	Issue #2 adapted from the Season 5 episode "Sheriff for a Day", issue #4 adapted from the Season 3 episode "The Blessed Event"; originally published in anaglyph 3D.	
The Flintstones (comics)	The Flintstones (1995)	22 issues	Ongoing series	September 1995 – May 1997		Archie Comics	Retitled Cartoon Network Presents: The Flintstones from #16 (December 1996).	
The Flintstones (comics)	Hanna-Barbera All-Stars	4 issues	Comic story, ongoing series	October 1995 – April 1996		Archie Comics	Self-contained stories spanning all four issues including "Honey, I Lost the Kids" (#1) and "The Fred Flintstone Show" (#4).	
The Flintstones (comics)	The Flintstones and the Jetsons	21 issues	Ongoing series	August 1997 – May 1999	Mike Carlin, Sam Henderson, Michael Kupperman, Matt Wayne, Robbie Busch, Chuck Dixon, Michael Kraiger, Glen Hanson, Sam Henderson, Allan Neuwirth	DC Comics	Anthology series alternating stories with fellow Hanna-Barbera series The Jetsons; the final issue (#21) features a crossover story loosely derived from the 1987 television film The Jetsons Meet the Flintstones titled "It's About Time" (22 pages total).	The Flintstones and the Jetsons TP
The Flintstones (comics)	Scooby-Doo Team-Up #7: "Scooby-Doo, When Are You?"	1 issue	Main feature (part of an ongoing series)	November 5, 2014, January 2015 (cover date)	Sholly Fisch	DC Comics		
The Flintstones (comics)	The Flintstones (2016)	6 issues	Limited series	June 6, 2016 – June 7, 2017	Mark Russell	DC Comics	Part of the Hanna-Barbera Beyond comic book initiative.	
The Flintstones (comics)	Booster Gold/The Flintstones Special	1 issue	One-shot	May 2017	Mark Russell, Jimmy Palmiotti, Amanda Conner	DC Comics	Crossover with DC's Booster Gold; part of the DC Meets Hanna-Barbera comic book line.	
Flipper (1964)	Flipper	3 issues	Ongoing series	April 1964 – November 1967		Gold Key Comics		
The Flying Nun	The Flying Nun	4 issues	Ongoing series	February – November 1968		Dell Comics		
Follow the Sun	Follow the Sun	2 issues	Ongoing series	July – November 1962		Dell Comics		
Foofur	Foofur	6 issues	Ongoing series	August 1987 – June 1988	Michael Gallagher, Tony Franco	Marvel Comics/Star Comics		
Four Feather Falls	TV Comic #439–564	106 issues	Comic story, serial	May 14, 1960 – October 6, 1962		Polystyle Publications		
Fraggle Rock	Fraggle Rock (1985)	3 issues	Ongoing series	April 1985 – September 1986	Stan Kay	Marvel Comics/Star Comics		
Fraggle Rock	Fraggle Rock (2010) (series 1)	3 issues	Ongoing series	April – June 2010	Adrianne Ambrose, Sam Humphries, Grace Randolph	Archaia Entertainment		
Fraggle Rock	Fraggle Rock (2010) (series 2)	v3 issues	Ongoing series	January – April 2011	Grace Randolph, Jake Forbes, Joe LeFavi	Archaia Entertainment		
Fraggle Rock	Fraggle Rock: Monsters from Outer Space	1 volume	One-shot	October 2011	Heather Nuhfer, Katie Strickland	Boom! Studios, Archaia Entertainment		
Fraggle Rock	Fraggle Rock: Journey to the Everspring	4 issues	Limited series	October 2014 – January 2015	Kate Leth	Boom! Studios, Archaia Entertainment		
Fraggle Rock	Fraggle Rock (2018)	3 issues	Ongoing series	May – August 2018	Jared Cullum, Jay P. Fosgitt, Art Baltazar, Katie Cook	Boom! Studios, Archaia Entertainment		
Frankenstein Jr. and The Impossibles	Frankenstein Jr. and The Impossibles	1 issue	One-shot	January 1967	?	Gold Key Comics	The comic features five Frankenstein Jr. stories: "The Image Invasion", "Cement Mixer Mystery", "Frankenstein, Jr. Meets the Flea Man" and two untitled short stories. Only one story "The Impossibles vs. the Mirror-Man" features the eponymous superhero team.	
Frankenstein Jr. and The Impossibles	Hanna-Barbera Presents #8	1 issue	One-shot	November 1996	Bill Matheny	Archie Comics	The comic features two stories for one of each: "Duel with the Dino-Master" with Frankenstein Jr. and "A Fink Called Feedback" with The Impossibles. The third and final story "Frankenstein Jr. Conquers the World" is a crossover with both characters.	
Frankenstein Jr. and The Impossibles	Scooby-Doo Team-Up #22: "Nothing Is Impossible"	1 issue	Main feature (part of an ongoing series)	January 25, 2017, March 2017 (cover date)	Sholly Fisch	DC Comics		
Fringe	Fringe	6 issues	Limited series	October 2008 – August 2009	Zack Whedon, Julia Cho, Alex Katsnelson, Danielle DiSpaltro, Mike Johnson, Matthew Pitts, Kim Cavyan, Justin Doble	WildStorm		
Fringe	Fringe: Tales from the Fringe	6 issues	Limited series	August 2010 – January 2011	Justin Doble, Alex Katsnelson, Adam Gaines, Christine Lavaf, Matthew Pitts, Danielle DiSpaltro, Kristin Cantrell, Mike Johnson, Kim Cavyan	WildStorm		
Frontier Doctor	Four Color (series 2) #877	1 issue	One-shot	February 1958	?	Dell Comics	The comic features two main stories, "Storm Over King City" (20 pages) and "Apache Uprising" (12 pages), and two non-fiction one-page fillers, "Before The Doctors Came West" and "The First Patent Medicines".	
F Troop	F-Troop	7 issues	Ongoing series	August 1966 – August 1967		Dell Comics		
The Funky Phantom	The Funky Phantom	13 issues	Ongoing series	March 1972 – March 1975		Gold Key Comics		
Fury	Four Color (series 2) #781, 885, 975, 1031, 1080, 1133, 1172, 1218, 1296	9 issues	One-shot	August 1957, March 1958, March 1959, September–November 1959, February–April 1960, August–October 1960, March–May 1961, September–November 1961, March–May 1962		Dell Comics		
Fury	Fury (series 1) #01-292-208	1 issue	One-shot	June–August 1962		Dell Comics		
Fury	Fury (series 2) #1	1 issue	Ongoing series (planned)	November 1962		Gold Key Comics	The comic features four main stories: "Modern Ghost Town" (1 page), "Mysterious Imposter" (16 pages), "Robber's Hide-Out" (16 pages) and "Narrow-Gauge Railroads" (1 page).	
Futurama	Futurama Comics	82 issues	Ongoing series	November 2000 – July 2018		Bongo Comics		Futurama-O-Rama TPB; Futurama Adventures TPB; Futurama: The Time Bender Trilogy TPB; Futurama Conquers the Universe TPB; Futurama Comics: To Infinity! TPB
Futurama	Futurama/Simpsons Infinitely Secret Crossover Crisis	2 issues	Limited series	August 2002 – January 2003	Boothby, Lloyd, Morrison	Bongo Comics		The Simpsons/Futurama Crossover Crisis HC
Futurama	The Simpsons/Futurama Crossover Crisis II	2 issues	Limited series	January – March 2005	Boothby, Lloyd	Bongo Comics		The Simpsons/Futurama Crossover Crisis HC
Futurama	Futurama Returns – Featuring The Return of Futurama!	1 issue	Minicomic	2007		Bongo Comics	Promotion for the 2008 series revival on Comedy Central; originally given away at San Diego Comic-Con before made available through commercial retailers.	

== G ==
Based on	Title	Length	Format	Publication date	Authors	Publisher	Notes	Collected editions
Galactica 1980	Galactica 1980	4 issues	Limited series	September 2009 – January 2010	Marc Guggenheim	Dynamite Entertainment	Re-imagined alternate telling of the eponymous series.	Paperback: 1606902288/978-1606902288
The Gallant Men	The Gallant Men	1 issue	One-shot	October 1963	?	Gold Key Comics		No
Gargantia on the Verdurous Planet	Gargantia on the Verdurous Planet		Serialized manga	January 10, 2013 – July 10, 2013	Wataru Mitogawa	Kadokawa Shoten	Serialized in Newtype Ace, then continued in Niconico's web magazine Kadokawa Niconico Ace.	Collected in three tankōbon volumes.
Gargoyles (comics)	Gargoyles (1995)	11 issues	Ongoing series	February – December 1995	Martin Pasko, Mort Todd	Marvel Comics	Non-canonical storyline unrelated to the later series that followed.	
Gargoyles (comics)	Gargoyles (2006)	5 issues	Limited series	June 2006 – August 2009	Greg Weisman	Slave Labor Graphics		
Gargoyles (comics)	Gargoyles: Bad Guys	4 issues	Limited series	November 2007 – April 2008	Greg Weisman	Slave Labor Graphics		
Gargoyles (comics)	Gargoyles (2022)	12 issues	Limited series	December 2022 – March 2024	Greg Weisman	Dynamite Entertainment		
Gargoyles (comics)	Gargoyles: Dark Ages	6 issues	Limited series	July 2023 – March 2024	Greg Weisman	Dynamite Entertainment		
Gargoyles (comics)	Gargoyles Halloween Special	1 issue	One-shot	October 2023	Greg Weisman	Dynamite Entertainment		
Gargoyles (comics)	Gargoyles: Quest	6 issues	Limited series	April – December 2024	Greg Weisman	Dynamite Entertainment		
Gargoyles (comics)	Gargoyles Winter Special	1 issue	One-shot	December 2024	Greg Weisman, Nate Cosby	Dynamite Entertainment		
Gargoyles (comics)	Gargoyles: Demona	6 issues	Limited series	May 2025, July – December 2025	Greg Weisman	Dynamite Entertainment	Five regular issues preluded by an FCDB-exclusive issue #0.	
Gargoyles (comics)	Gargoyles Winter Special 2025	1 issue	One-shot	December 2025	Greg Weisman, Nate Cosby	Dynamite Entertainment		
Garrison's Gorillas	Garrison's Gorillas	5 issues	Ongoing series	January 1968 – October 1969		Dell Comics		No
Gen:Lock	Gen:Lock	6 issues	Limited series	January – June 2020		DC Comics		
Generator Rex	Cartoon Network Action Pack! #50, 51, 54, 55, 56, 57, 59, 60, 61, 63, 64, 65, 66, 67	14 issues	Main feature, ongoing series	August 2010, September 2010, January 2011, February 2011, March 2011, April 2011, June 2011, July 2011, August 2011, October 2011, November 2011, January 2012, March 2012, May 2012		DC Comics	Fourteenth self-contained stories spanning fourteenth select issues, the following stories in order: "Distraction!" (#50), "Extra Baggage" (#51), "Heart of Stone" (#54), "Home for the Holidays" (#55), "A Blank Canvas" (#56), "The Unforgiving Minute" (#57), "Only a Game" (#59), "Grunion Run!" (#60), "Night of the Living Movie" (#61), "Anything You Can Chew" (#63), "The Quest!" (#64), "Hero Times Two" (#65), "Unhappy Holiday" (#66) and "Wood for the Trees" (#67).	
Gentle Ben	Gentle Ben	5 issues	Ongoing series	February 1968 – October 1969		Dell Comics		No
George of the Jungle	George of the Jungle — with Tom Slick and Super Chicken	2 issues	Ongoing series	February – October 1969		Gold Key Comics		No
The Get Along Gang	The Get Along Gang	6 issues	Ongoing series	May 1985 – March 1986	Dave Manak	Star Comics		No
Get Smart	Get Smart	8 issues	Ongoing series	June 1966 – September 1967	Joe Gill	Dell Comics		No
Ghostbusters	Filmation's Ghostbusters	4 issues	Ongoing series	February – June 1986	Hilarie Staton	First Comics		No
Ghost Whisperer	Ghost Whisperer: The Haunted	5 issues	Limited series	March – July 2008	Carrie Smith, Becca Smith	IDW Publishing		
Ghost Whisperer	Ghost Whisperer: The Muse	4 issues	Limited series	December 2008 – March 2009	Barbara Randall Kesel	IDW Publishing		
Gidget	Gidget	2 issues	Ongoing series	April – December 1966		Dell Comics		
The Girl from U.N.C.L.E.	The Girl from U.N.C.L.E.	5 issues	Ongoing series	January – October 1966		Gold Key Comics		No
Glee	Archie (volume 1) #641–644: "Archie Meets Glee"	4 issues	Serial	April 2013 – July 2013	Roberto Aquirre-Sacasa	Archie Comics	Crossover with Archie.	
The Goldbergs	The Goldbergs	1 issue	One-shot	2018	Adam F. Goldberg	American Mythology		
Gomer Pyle, U.S.M.C.	Gomer Pyle, U.S.M.C.	3 issues	Ongoing series	July 1966 – October 1967		Gold Key Comics		No
The Governor & J.J.	The Governor and J.J.	3 issues	Ongoing series	February – August 1970	Paul S. Newman	Gold Key Comics		No
Gravity Falls	Gravity Falls: Lost Legends	1 volume	Graphic novel	July 24, 2018	Alex Hirsch	Disney Press		Hardcover: 9781368021425
The Gray Ghost	Four Color (series 2) #911, #1000	2 issues	One-shot	June 1958, June–August 1959	Paul S. Newman	Dell Comics	Two tryout issues for a possible ongoing series that never saw the light of day.	No
The Green Hornet	The Green Hornet (1967)	3 issues	Ongoing series	February – August 1967	Paul S. Newman	Gold Key Comics		No
The Green Hornet	Batman '66 Meets the Green Hornet	6 issues	Limited series	August 2014 – January 2015	Kevin Smith, Ralph Garman	DC Comics, Dynamite Entertainment		
The Green Hornet	The Green Hornet '66 Meets the Spirit	5 issues	Limited series	2017	Fred Van Lente	Dynamite Entertainment		
The Grim Adventures of Billy & Mandy	Cartoon Cartoons #14, 22, 24, 29, 32	5 issues	Main feature, back-up feature, ongoing series	January 2003, November 2003, January 2004, June 2004, September 2004	Gord Zajac (#14), Jesse Leon McCann (#22, 24, 29, 32)	DC Comics	Five self-contained stories spanning five select issues, the following stories in order: "Central Junction: What's Your Function?" (#14), "Bowled Over" (#22), "Grade School Follies: History According to Grim" (#24), "Everybody Loves a Clown" (#29) and "Sweet Dreams" (#32).	
The Grim Adventures of Billy & Mandy	Cartoon Network Block Party #1, 3, 4, 8, 9, 11, 14, 15, 16, 17, 21, 23, 24, 26, 27, 28, 34, 35, 36, 37, 38, 41, 45, 53, 54, 56	26 issues	Main feature, ongoing series	November 2004, January 2005, February 2005, June 2005, July 2005, September 2005, December 2005, January 2006, February 2006, March 2006, July 2006, September 2006, October 2006, December 2006, January 2007, February 2007, August 2007, September 2007, October 2007, December 2007, March 2008, July 2008, January 2009, March 2009, April 2009	Jesse Leon McCann (#1, 4, 8, 9, 17), Sholly Fisch (#3, 14, 21, 23, 28), Scott Cunningham (#11, 15, 16, 24, 27, 34, 35, 36, 38, 41, 51 53), Robbie Busch (#26, 56), Paul Kupperberg (#45), Frank Strom (#54),	DC Comics	28 self-contained stories spanning 26 select issues, the following stories in order: "Stage Fright" (#1), "Them Bones" (#3), "Grim's Bedtime Stories" (#4), "Booty Camp" (#8), "Model Citizen" (#9), "Lost & Hound" (#11), "Carry On, Luggage!" (#14), "Frame of Mine" (#15), "The Billy Channel" (#16), "Out, Darn Spot!" (#17), "Reaper Madness" (#21), "Behind the Cue Ball" (#23), "Pest in Show" (#24), "Grim Meal" (#26), "Endsville Incident" (#27), "All Washed Up" (#28), "Toxic Beach Party" and "Less Is Moron" (both #34), "Scout's Dishonor" (#35), "Future Tense" (#36), "Count Gerbil" (#38), "Nose No Bounds" (#41), "Better Luck Next Time!" (#45), "Double Neggative" (#51), "No Pain, No Gain" and "Get Lost" (both #53), "Bully for You" (#54) and "Time Waits for No Mandy" (#56).	
The Gumby Show	Gumby 3-D	7 issues	Limited series	October 1986 – January 1988	Art Clokey, David Cody Weiss	Blackthorne Publishing	Originally published in anaglyph 3D.	No
The Gumby Show	Gumby's Summer Fun Special	1 issue	One-shot	July 1987	Bob Burden	Comico		No
The Gumby Show	Gumby's Winter Fun Special	1 issue	One-shot	December 1988	Steve Purcell	Comico		No
The Gumby Show	Gumby (2006)	3 issues	Ongoing series	July 2006 – July 2007	Bob Burden, Rick Geary, Steve Oliff	Wildcard Ink		
The Gumby Show	Gumby FCDB Special 2007	1 issue	One-shot	May 2007	Shannon Wheeler	Wildcard Ink	Free Comic Book Day 2007 exclusive.	
The Gumby Show	Gumby FCDB Special 2008	1 issue	One-shot	May 2008	Mike Hersh, Bob Burden	Wildcard Ink	Free Comic Book Day 2008 exclusive.	
The Gumby Show	Gumby's Gang – Starring Pokey	1 issue	Limited series (planned)	July 2010	Michael Aushenker	Wildcard Ink		
The Gumby Show	Gumby (2017)	3 issues	Ongoing series	July – September 2017	Jeff Whitman, Ray Fawkes, Kyle Baker, Mike Kazaleh, Sholly Fisch, Eric Esquivel, Andy Fish	Papercutz		
Gunsmoke	Four Color (series 2) #679, #720, #769, #797, #844	27 issues	One-shot	February 1956, August 1956, February 1957, May 1957, August 1957	Paul S. Newman	Dell Comics	The first five issues are tryout issues for the eventual series, all published apart from each other.	No
Gunsmoke	Gunsmoke #6–27	27 issues	Ongoing series	January 1958 – July 1961		Dell Comics	The main series overall; continued from Four Color #844.	No

== H ==
Based on	Title	Length	Format	Publication date	Authors	Publisher	Notes	Collected editions
Hanna-Barbera	Hanna-Barbera Band-Wagon	3 issues	Ongoing series	October 1962 – April 1963	Bob Gregory (#1)	Gold Key Comics		No
Hanna-Barbera	Hanna-Barbera Super TV Heroes	7 issues	Ongoing series	April 1968 – September 1969	Jerry Siegel (#2), Carl Fallberg (#2), Don R. Christen seen (#3, 4, 6)	Gold Key Comics		No
Hanna-Barbera	Hanna-Barbera Hi-Adventure Heroes	2 issues	Ongoing series	May – August 1969	?	Gold Key Comics		No
Hanna-Barbera	Hanna-Barbera Fun-In	15 issues	Ongoing series	February 1970 – December 1974	?	Gold Key Comics		No
Hanna-Barbera	Hanna-Barbera Parade	10 issues	Ongoing series	September 1971 – December 1972		Charlton Comics		No
Hanna-Barbera	The Funtastic World of Hanna-Barbera	3 issues	Limited series	December 1977 – June 1978		Marvel Comics	Treasury-sized editions published quarterly.	No
Hanna-Barbera	TV Stars	4 issues	Limited series	August 1978 – February 1979		Marvel Comics		No
Hanna-Barbera	Hanna-Barbera Spotlight	4 issues	Ongoing series	September 1978 – May 1979		Marvel Comics		
Hanna-Barbera	Hanna-Barbera All-Stars	4 issues	Ongoing series	October 1995 – April 1996		Archie Comics		
Hanna-Barbera	Hanna-Barbera Presents	8 issues	Ongoing series	November 1995 – November 1996		Archie Comics		
Hanna-Barbera	Cartoon Network Christmas Spectacular	1 issue	One-shot	December 1997	Bill Mattheny, Bill Vallely	Archie Comics	48 page special edition; the publication overall is an anthology of nine self-contained stories featuring Scooby-Doo ("Too Much Christmas Spirit"), The Flintstones ("It's a Gift"), Huckleberry Hound ("Mail Must Go Through"), The Jetsons ("The Last Christmas Carol"), Magilla Gorilla ("Don't Badger the Customers!"), Yogi Bear ("It's a Blunderful Life") and Quick Draw McGraw in three stories in a row ("The Top 10 Cultural Events of the Year in Guzzler's Gulch!", "Quick Draw!" and "Buried").	
Hanna-Barbera Beyond	Future Quest	12 issues	Limited series	May 2016 – May 2017	Jeff Parker	DC Comics		
Hanna-Barbera Beyond	Scooby Apocalypse	36 issues	Ongoing series	May 2016 – April 2019	Jim Lee, Keith Giffen, J. M. DeMatteis, Heath Corson	DC Comics		
Hanna-Barbera Beyond	The Flintstones	12 issues	Limited series	September 2016 – August 2017	Mark Russell	DC Comics		
Hanna-Barbera Beyond	Wacky Raceland	6 issues	Limited series	June – November 2016	Ken Pontac	DC Comics		
Hanna-Barbera Beyond	Future Quest Presents	12 issues	Limited series	August 2017 – July 2018	Jeff Parker (#1–4, 8, 12), Phil Hester (#5–7), Rob Williams (#9–11)	DC Comics		
Hanna-Barbera Beyond	Dastardly and Muttley	6 issues	Limited series	September – February 2018	Garth Ennis	DC Comics		
Hanna-Barbera Beyond	The Ruff and Reddy Show	6 issues	Limited series	December 2017 – May 2018	Howard Chaykin	DC Comics		
Hanna-Barbera Beyond	The Jetsons	6 issues	Limited series	November 2017 – April 2018	Jimmy Palmiotti	DC Comics		
Hanna-Barbera Beyond	Exit, Stage Left!: The Snagglepuss Chronicles	6 issues	Limited series	January – June 2018	Mark Russell	DC Comics		
The Hanna-Barbera New Cartoon Series	Lippy the Lion and Hardy Har Har	1 issue	One-shot	March 1963	?	Gold Key Comics		No
The Hanna-Barbera New Cartoon Series	Hanna-Barbera Band Wagon #1, 2, 3	3 issues	Back-up feature, ongoing series	October 1962, January 1963, April 1963	Bob Gregory (#1)	Gold Key Comics	Wally Gator, Lippy the Lion and Hardy Har Har and Touché Turtle and Dum Dum were all featured in three back-up stories in all three issues of this title; Wally Gator: "Bored and Room" (#1), "Troubles, Bungles and Beads" (#2) and "Happy Birthday Blues" (#3), Lippy and Hardy: "A Topsy Turvy Tale" (#1), "A Laughing Matter" (#2) and "Fun Is Where You Find It" (#3) and Touché Turtle: "Danger in Disguise" (#1), "Some Swamp Swapping" (#2), "Easier Said Than Done" (#3).	No
The Hanna-Barbera New Cartoon Series	Cave Kids #4	1 issue	Back-up feature (part of an ongoing series)	March 1964	?	Gold Key Comics	Lippy the Lion and Hardy Har Har were guest featured in the four-page back-up story of this issue: "The Invisible Diamond".	No
The Hanna-Barbera New Cartoon Series	Hanna-Barbera Parade #1, 2, 5, 7, 8	5 issues	Back-up feature, ongoing series	September 1971, November 1971, February 1972	Phil Mendez (#1), Gwen Krause (#7, 8)	Charlton Comics	Wally Gator, Lippy the Lion and Hardy Har Har and Touché Turtle and Dum Dum were all featured in back-up stories in this bimonthly title; both Wally Gator and Lippy and Hardy each had featured only in one story from the first issue, for Wally Gator: "Heading South" (#1), for Lippy and Hardy: "Meet the Champ" (#1); Touché Turtle was featured in most stories, appearing in a total of five in five issues apart: "Beware of the Dragon" (#1), "Double Trouble!" (#2), "No Grace" (#5), "Spook Boat" (#7), "Pet Show" (#8).	No
The Hanna-Barbera New Cartoon Series	Hanna-Barbera Summer Picnic #3	1 issue	Back-up feature	Summer 1971	?	Charlton Comics	Wally, Lippy, Hardy, Touché and Dum Dum all were featured in this title, which continues from the numbering of Parade; only two back-up features are one-page comic stories: one is a standalone "Wally Gator and Mr. Twiddle" story and the other "Tangled Mess", a mini-crossover guest featuring Chopper (from The Yogi Bear Show); for the rest of the book, the characters were the subject of ten one-page activities.	No
The Hanna-Barbera New Cartoon Series	Cartoon Network Presents #12	1 issue	Back-up feature (part of an ongoing series)	August 1998	Sam Henderson	DC Comics	Lippy the Lion and Hardy Har Har were featured in the eight-page back-up story of this issue: "Proz-Ac and Cons".	No
Happy Days	Happy Days	6 issues	Ongoing series	March 1979 – January 1980		Gold Key Comics		No
The Hardy Boys (1969)	The Hardy Boys	4 issues	Ongoing series	April 1970 – January 1971	Don R. Christensen	Gold Key Comics		No
Harlem Globetrotters	Hanna-Barbera Fun-In #8, 10	2 issues	Main feature (part of an ongoing series)	July 1971, January 1972	Don R. Christensen (#8)	Gold Key Comics	The Harlem Globetrotters appeared in two main feature strips in two issues apart: "Great Geese Goof-Up" (28 pages, #8) and "Double Dribble Trouble" (17 pages, #10).	No
Harlem Globetrotters	Harlem Globetrotters	12 issues	Ongoing series	April 1972 – January 1975	Don R. Christensen	Gold Key Comics		No
The Hathaways	Four Color (series 2) #1298	1 issue	One-shot	March–June 1962	?	Dell Comics		No
The Haunted House								
Have Gun – Will Travel	Four Color (series 2) #931, 983 and 1044	3 issues	One-shot	1958, 1959, October–December 1959		Dell Comics		No
Have Gun – Will Travel	Have Gun, Will Travel #4–14	11 issues	Ongoing series	January–March 1960 - July–September 1962		Dell Comics		No
Hawaiian Eye	Hawaiian Eye	1 issue	One-shot	July 1963		Gold Key Comics		No
Hawkeye and the Last of the Mohicans	Four Color (series 2) #884	1 issue	One-shot	March 1958		Dell Comics		No
The Head	MTV's The Head: A Legend Is Born	1	Graphic novel	April 1996	Eric Fogel, Gordon Barnett	Pocket Books		
The Hector Heathcote Show	Hector Heathcote	1 issue	One-shot	March 1964		Gold Key Comics		No
Help!... It's the Hair Bear Bunch!	The Hair Bear Bunch	9 issues	Ongoing series	February 1972 – February 1974		Gold Key Comics		No
Help!... It's the Hair Bear Bunch!	Hanna-Barbera Fun-In #13	1 issue	Main feature (part of an ongoing series)	August 1974	?	Gold Key Comics	Two self-contained stories featured in the issue: "One Bunch Too Many" (13 pages) and "The Sultan's Scimitar" (12 pages).	No
He-Man and the Masters of the Universe (1983)	Masters of the Universe	13 issues	Ongoing series	May 1986 – May 1988		Marvel Comics/Star Comics		
He-Man and the Masters of the Universe (1983)	He-Man and the Masters of the Multiverse #4	1 issue	Main feature (part of a limited series)	April 2020	Tim Seeley	DC Comics		
He-Man and the Masters of the Universe (2002)	Masters of the Universe (2002)	4 issues	Limited series	November 2002 – February 2003	Val Staples	Image Comics		
He-Man and the Masters of the Universe (2002)	He-Man and the Masters of the Multiverse #3	1 issue	Main feature (part of a limited series)	March 2020	Tim Seeley	DC Comics		
Hercules: The Legendary Journeys	Hercules: The Legendary Journeys	5 issues	Ongoing series	June – October 1996	Roy Thomas	Topps Comics		No
High Adventure	Four Color (series 2) #949, 1001	2 issues	One-shot	November 1958, August–October 1959		Dell Comics		No
The High Chaparral	The High Chaparral	1 issue	One-shot	August 1968		Gold Key Comics		No
Honey West	Honey West	1 issue	One-shot	September 1966	Paul S. Newman	Gold Key Comics		No
The Honeymooners	Jackie Gleason and the Honeymooners	12 issues	Ongoing series	July 1956 – May 1958		DC Comics		No
The Honeymooners	The Honeymooners (1986)	1 issue	One-shot	October 1986	Robert Loren Fleming, Norman Abramoff (plot), Vince Musacchia	Lodestone Publishing, Inc.		The Illustrated Honeymooners Portfolio HC
The Honeymooners	The Honeymooners (1987)	12 issues	Ongoing series	September 1987 – July–August 1989		Triad Publications		The Illustrated Honeymooners Portfolio HC
Hogan's Heroes	Hogan's Heroes	9 issues	Ongoing series	June 1966 – October 1969		Dell Comics		No
Hong Kong Phooey	Hong Kong Phooey	9 issues	Ongoing series	May 1975 – November 1976		Charlton Comics		
Hong Kong Phooey	Black Lightning/Hong Kong Phooey Special	1 issue	One-shot	July 2018	Bryan Hill, Jeff Parker	DC Comics	Crossover with DC's Black Lightning; part of the DC Meets Hanna-Barbera comic book line.	
Hotel de Paree	Four Color (series 2) #1126: "Hotel de Paree — Sundance"	1 issue	One-shot	August–October 1960	Gaylord Du Bois	Dell Comics		No
Hotel Transylvania: The Series	Hotel Transylvania: The Series: My Little Monster-Sitter	1 issue	Graphic novel	Stefan Petrucha	June 2019	Papercutz		
Howdy Doody	Howdy Doody	38 issues	Ongoing series	January 1950 – September 1956		Dell Comics		
H.R. Pufnstuf	H.R. Pufnstuf	8 issues	Ongoing series	October 1970 – July 1972		Gold Key Comics		
The Huckleberry Hound Show	Four Color (series 2) #990 and 1050: "Huckleberry Hound"	2 issues	One-shot	May–July 1959, October–December 1959		Dell Comics		No
The Huckleberry Hound Show	Four Color (series 2) #1054: "Huckleberry Hound Winter Fun"	1 issue	One-shot	December 1959		Dell Comics		No
The Huckleberry Hound Show	Four Color (series 2) #1067: "Yogi Bear"	1 issue	One-shot	December 1959-February 1960	?	Dell Comics	Yogi was originally part of The Huckleberry Hound Show at the time of this issues' publication.	No
The Huckleberry Hound Show	Huckleberry Hound (1960) #3–43	41 issues	Ongoing series	January–February 1960 – October 1970		Dell Comics, Gold Key Comics		No
The Huckleberry Hound Show	Four Color (series 2) #1104: "Yogi Bear Goes to College"	1 issue	One-shot	June–August 1960	?	Dell Comics	Yogi was originally part of The Huckleberry Hound Show at the time of this issues' publication.	No
The Huckleberry Hound Show	Four Color (series 2) #1141: "Huckleberry Hound for President"	1 issue	One-shot	October 1960	?	Dell Comics		No
The Huckleberry Hound Show	Four Color (series 2) #1112, 1196, 1264: "Pixie and Dixie and Mr. Jinks"	3 issues	One-shot	July–September 1960, July–September 1961, December 1961-February 1962	?	Dell Comics		No
The Huckleberry Hound Show	Dell Giant #44: "Around the World with Huckleberry and His Friends"	1 issue	One-shot	July 1961	?	Dell Comics		No
The Huckleberry Hound Show	Huckleberry Hound Weekly	308 issues	Ongoing series	October 7, 1961 – August 28, 1967	City Magazines (1961–1967), Hayward (1967)	Various	British Weekly publication; later retitled Huckleberry Hound and Yogi Bear Weekly on the cover from 1964.	No
The Huckleberry Hound Show	Four Color (series 2) #1310: "Huck and Yogi Winter Sports"	1 issue	One-shot	March 1962	?	Dell Comics		No
The Huckleberry Hound Show	Pixie and Dixie and Mr. Jinks #01631-207	1 issue	One-shot	May–July 1962	?	Dell Comics		No
The Huckleberry Hound Show	Hanna-Barbera Pixie and Dixie and Mister Jinks	1 issue	One-shot	February 1963	?	Gold Key Comics		No
The Huckleberry Hound Show	Hanna-Barbera Band Wagon #1, 2, 3	3 issues	Back-up feature, ongoing series	October 1962, January 1963, April 1963	Bob Gregory (#1)	Gold Key Comics	Pixie & Dixie and Mr. Jinks and Hokey Wolf were featured in select back-up stories in all three issues of this title; Pixie & Dixie appeared in four strips: "The Last Ka-boom" and "Chattanooga Chew Chew" (both #1), "Two Too Many Meeces" (#2) and one untitled story (#3), while Hokey Wolf appeared in two strips: "Grinnin' Bear-It" (#1) and "The Robin Wasn't a Bird" (#2).	No
The Huckleberry Hound Show	Huckleberry Hound (1970)	8 issues	Ongoing series	November 1970 – January 1972	Joe Gill (#1, 4, 6, 7), Phil Mendez (#8)	Charlton Comics		No
The Huckleberry Hound Show	Hanna-Barbera Parade #4, 6, 7, 8, 9, 10	6 issues	Back-up feature, ongoing series	January 1972, April 1972, May 1972, July 1972, October 1972, December 1972	Gwen Krause (#7, 9)	Charlton Comics	Huckleberry Hound, Pixie & Dixie and Mr. Jinks and Hokey Wolf were all featured in back-up stories in this bimonthly title; Huckleberry had appeared in eight strips across six issues: "Current Crisis" (#4), "Boxed In" (#6), "Father Time" and "40 Winks" (both #7), "The New Man" (#8) "Fish Can Play Too!" and "Datsa Amoré" (#9), "Weather Maybe" (#10), while Hokey only had one standalone strip: "Eat and Run" (#6). Pixie and Dixie also guest featured in two of the eight Huckleberry Hound features in #2 and 9.	No
The Huckleberry Hound Show	Hanna-Barbera Spotlight #1	1 issue	Main feature, back-up feature	September 1978	Mark Evanier	Marvel Comics	Huckleberry appeared in the main feature of this issue "Tin Can Town" (14 pages) guest featuring Yogi Bear, while Hokey appeared in the back-up feature "The Bronco Buster" (3 pages).	No
The Huckleberry Hound Show	Cartoon Network Presents #8	1 issue	Back-up feature (part of an ongoing series)	March 1998	Matt Wayne	DC Comics	Huckleberry Hound was featured in the eight-page back-up story of this issue: "War Is Huck".	
The Huckleberry Hound Show	Green Lantern/Huckleberry Hound Special	1 issue	One-shot	December 2018	Mark Russell, J.M. Dematteis	DC Comics	Crossover with DC's Green Lantern; part of the DC Meets Hanna-Barbera comic book line.	
Husbands	Husbands: The Comic							

== I ==
Based on	Title	Length	Format	Publication date	Authors	Publisher	Notes	Collected editions
I Dream of Jeannie	I Dream of Jeannie	2 issues	Ongoing series	April – December 1966		Dell Comics		
I Love Lucy	I Love Lucy	#3—35	Ongoing series	August 1954 – April 1962		Dell Comics		
I Spy	I Spy	6 issues	Ongoing series	August 1966 – September 1968		Gold Key Comics		
I'm Dickens, He's Fenster	I'm Dickens, He's Fenster	2 issues	Ongoing series	July – October 1963		Dell Comics		
Inhumanoids	Inhumanoids	4 issues	Ongoing series	January – July 1987		Marvel Comics/Star Comics	Adaptation of the five-episode storyline "The Evil That Lies Within".	
Invader Zim	Invader Zim	50 issues	Ongoing series	July 2015 – March 2020	Jhonen Vasquez, Eric Trueheart, K.C. Green, Dennis Hopeless, Jessie Hopeless, Kyle Starks, Sarah Anderson, Danielle Koenig, Jamie Smart, Ian McGinty, Aaron Alexovich, Dave Crosland, Sarah Graley, Rikki Simons, Sam Maggs, Steven Shanahan, Matthew Seely, Tait Howard, Sam Logan, Drew Rausch	Oni Press		
Invader Zim	Invader Zim Quarterly	2 issues	Ongoing series	June 2020 – August 2020	Eric Trueheart, Sam Logan	Oni Press		
Invader Zim	Invader Zim Quarterly: Holiday Special	1 issue	One-shot	December 2020	Eric Trueheart	Oni Press		
Invader Zim	Invader Zim Quarterly: Zim's Greatest Plan	1 issue	One-shot	March 2021	Sam Logan	Oni Press		
Invader Zim	Invader Zim: The Dookie Loop Horror	1 issue	One-shot	August 2021		Oni Press		
The Invaders	The Invaders	4 issues	Ongoing series	October 1967 – October 1968		Gold Key Comics		
Iron Horse	Iron Horse	2 issues	Ongoing series	March – June 1967		Dell Comics		
It's About Time	It's About Time	1 issue	One-shot	January 1967		Gold Key Comics		

== J ==
Based on	Title	Length	Format	Publication date	Authors	Publisher	Notes	Collected editions
Jabberjaw	Cartoon Network Presents #23: "Gammyjaws"	1 issue	Comic story	July 1999	Dan Abnett, Jeff Parker	Chuck Kim	The main feature story, "Gammyjaws" (eight pages), followed by two back-up two stories featuring Speed Buggy ("Bay, Humbug!", six pages) and Captain Caveman and the Teen Angels ("Neanderthal Nightmare", eight pages).	
Jabberjaw	Aquaman/Jabberjaw Special	1 issue	One-shot	July 2018	Dan Abnett, Jeff Parker	DC Comics	Crossover with DC's Aquaman; part of the DC Meets Hanna-Barbera comic book line.	
Jackie Chan Adventures	Jackie Chan Adventures Magazine	82 issues	Ongoing series, magazine	September 3, 2003 – September 13, 2006		Eaglemoss International Ltd	Published forenightly; the magazine regularly featured two ongoing comic strips, "The J-Team" (four pages) and "Jade's Adventures" (one page), the latter featured at the end on the twenty-third page of the magazine.	
Jackie Chan Adventures	Jackie Chan Adventures Cine-Manga	4 volumes	Graphic novels	November 11, 2003 – April 2004	John Rogers, David Stack	Tokyopop		
James Bond Jr.	James Bond Jr.	12 issues	Limited series	January – December 1992	Cal Hamilton, Dan Abnett	Marvel Comics		
Jem	Jem and the Holograms	26 issues	Ongoing series	March 2015 – April 2017	Kelly Thompson	IDW Publishing		
Jericho (2006)	Jericho: Season 3 – Civil War	6 issues	Limited series	October 2009 – May 2011	Dan Shotz, Robert Levine, Jason M. Burns, Matthew Federman	Devil's Due Publishing (#1–3), IDW Publishing (#4–6)		
Jesse James Is a Dead Man	Jesse James Is a Dead Man	1 issue	One-shot	May 2009	Mac Foster	Marvel Custom		
The Jetsons	The Jetsons (1962)	36 issues	Ongoing series	January 1963 – October 1970		Gold Key Comics		
The Jetsons	The Jetsons (1970)	20 issues	Ongoing series	October 1970 – December 1973		Charlton Comics		
The Jetsons	The Jetsons (1996)	8 issues	Ongoing series	September 1995 – April 1996	Angelo De Cesare, Bill Vallely	Archie Comics		
The Jetsons	The Flintstones and the Jetsons	21 issues	Ongoing series	August 1997 – May 1999	Mike Carlin, Sam Henderson, Michael Kupperman, Matt Wayne, Robbie Busch, Chuck Dixon, Michael Kraiger, Glen Hanson, Sam Henderson, Allan Neuwirth	DC Comics	Anthology series alternating stories with fellow Hanna-Barbera series The Flintstones; the final issue (#21) features a crossover story loosely derived from the 1987 television film The Jetsons Meet the Flintstones titled "It's About Time" (22 pages total).	Paperback: 1401272401/978-1401272401
The Jetsons	The Jetsons (2017)	6 issues	Limited series	November 2017 – April 2018	Jimmy Palmiotti	DC Comics	Part of the Hanna-Barbera Beyond comic book line.	
Johnny Ringo	Four Color (series 2) #1142	1 issue	One-shot	November 1960-January 1961		Dell Comics		No
Johnny Test	Johnny Test: The Once and Future Johnny	1 volume	Graphic novel	September 2011	Dale Mettam	Viper Comics		
Jonny Quest	Jonny Quest (1964)	1 issue	One-shot	December 1964		Gold Key Comics	The main feature story, adapted from the series'first episode "The Mystery of the Lizard Men" (32 pages), preceded by a one-page introduction of the characters ("Cast of Characters"), followed by a one-page educational piece on the Sargasso Sea ("The Strange Sargasso Sea") and a pin-up illustration of two early development sketches, probably drawn by Doug Wildey.	
Justice League	Justice League Adventures	34 issues	Ongoing series	January 2002 – October 2004		DC Comics		Paperback: 156389954X/9781563899546

== K ==
Based on	Title	Length	Format	Publication date	Authors	Publisher	Notes	Collected editions
Karate Kommandos	Chuck Norris: Karate Kommandos	4 issues	Limited series	January – July 1987	Mary Jo Duffy	Star Comics		
Kid 'n Play	Kid 'n Play	9 issues	Ongoing series	February – October 1992	Dwight Coye	Marvel Comics		
King Arthur and the Knights of Justice	King Arthur and the Knights of Justice	3 issues	Limited series	December 1993 – February 1994	Mike Lackey	Marvel Comics		
King Leonardo and His Short Subjects	Four Color (series 2) #1242, #1278	2	Tryout	November 1961-January 1962, February–April 1962	?	Dell Comics		
Kissyfur	Kissyfur	1 issue	One-shot	1989	Phil Mendez	DC Comics		
Kolchak: The Night Stalker	Kolchak: The Night Stalker	1 issue		2002	Jeff Rice	Moonstone Books		
The Krofft Supershow	The Krofft Supershow	6 issues	Ongoing series	April 1978 – January 1979		Gold Key Comics		
Krypto the Superdog	Krypto the Superdog	6 issues	Limited series	November 2006 – April 2007	Jesse Leon McCann	DC Comics		Paperback: 1779509278/978-1779509277

== L ==
Based on	Title	Length	Format	Publication date	Authors	Publisher	Notes	Collected editions
Laff-a-Lympics	Hanna-Barbera's Laff-a-Lympics	13 issues	Ongoing series	March 1978 – March 1979	Mark Evanier	Marvel Comics		No
Lancelot Link, Secret Chimp	Lancelot Link, Secret Chimp	8 issues	Ongoing series	May 1971 – February 1973	?	Gold Key Comics		No
Land of the Giants	Land of the Giants	5 issues	Ongoing series	November 1968 – September 1969	?	Gold Key Comics		No
Laramie	Four Color (series 2) #1125, #1223, #1284	3 issues	One-shot	August–October 1960, September–November 1961, February–April 1962	Paul S. Newman	Dell Comics		No
Laramie	Laramie #01-418-207	1 issue	One-shot	May–July 1962	?	Dell Comics		No
Lawman	Four Color (series 2) #970, #1035	11 issues	One-shot	December 1958, November 1959-January 1960		Dell Comics		No
Lawman	Lawman #3–11	11 issues	Ongoing series	February 1960 – April 1962		Dell Comics		No
Leave It to Beaver	Four Color (series 2) #912, #999, #1103, #1191, #1285, 01-428-207	5 issues	One-shot	June 1958, June–August 1959, June–August 1960, July–September 1961, Feb-April 1962	?	Dell Comics		No
Leave It to Beaver	Leave It to Beaver #01-428-207	1 issue	One-shot	May–July 1962	?	Dell Comics		No
The Legend of Jesse James	The Legend of Jesse James	1 issue	One-shot	February 1966	?	Gold Key Comics		No
The Legend of Korra	Main article: The Legend of Korra (comics)							
Legion of Super Heroes	Legion of Super-Heroes in the 31st Century	20 issues	Ongoing series	June 2007 – January 2009	J. Torres, Scott Beatty, Christine Boylan, Jai Nitz, Jack Briglio, Matt Manning, Jake Black	DC Comics		Legion of Super-Heroes in the 31st Century: Tomorrow's Heroes TP: 1401216684/978-1401216689
The Librarian	The Librarian: Return to King Solomon's Mines – The Graphic Novel	1 volume	Graphic novel	December 2006	James Watson	Atlantis Studios	Adaptation of the eponymous second TV film.	
The Librarian	The Librarians	4 issues	Limited series	November 2017 – March 2018	Will Pfeifer	Dynamite Entertainment	Based on the sequel TV series.	
Lidsville	Lidsville	5 issues	Limited series	October 1972 – October 1973	Don Christensen	Gold Key Comics		No
The Life and Legend of Wyatt Earp	Four Color (series 2) #860, #890, #921: "Wyatt Earp"	13 issues	One-shot	November 1957, February 1958, June 1958	Eric Freiwald, Robert Schaefer	Dell Comics		No
The Life and Legend of Wyatt Earp	Wyatt Earp #4–13	13 issues	Ongoing series	September–November 1958 – December 1960-February 1961		Dell Comics		No
The Life of Riley	Four Color (series 2) #917	1 issue	One-shot	July 1958		Dell Comics		No
Linus the Lionhearted	Linus the Lionhearted	1 issue	One-shot	September 1965		Gold Key Comics		No
Little Dracula	Little Dracula	3 issues	Limited series	January – May 1992	Michael Gallagher, Dave Manak, Jorge Pacheco	Harvey Comics		No
The Little Mermaid	Disney's The Little Mermaid	12 issues	Ongoing series	September 1994 – August 1995	Trina Robbins, Martin Pasko, Kayte Kuch, Sheryl Scarborough	Marvel Comics		
Lost in Space (comics)	Lost in Space	18 issues	Ongoing series	August 1991 – January 1994	Matt Thompson, David Campiti, George Borderick, Jr., Bill Mumy, Kevin Burns, Terry Collins	Innovation Publishing	Retitled Lost in Space: Voyage to the Bottom of the Soul from #13 for the titular six-issue storyline.	
Lost in Space (comics)	Lost in Space: The Lost Adventures	6 issues	Limited series	March – November 2016	Holly Interlandi (adaptation), Carey Wilber (original)	American Gothic Press		
The Loud House	The Loud House	23 volumes	Graphic novels	May 2017 – August 2022		Papercutz		
The Lucy Show	The Lucy Show	5 issues	Ongoing series	June 1963 – June 1964		Gold Key Comics		No

== M ==
Based on	Title	Length	Format	Publication date	Authors	Publisher	Notes	Collected editions
Mackenzie's Raiders	Four Color (series 2) #1093	1 issue	One-shot	June–August 1960	Eric Freiwald, Robert Schaefer	Dell Comics	Tryout issue for a possible series that went unpublished.	No
The Magilla Gorilla Show	Magilla Gorilla (1964)	10 issues	Ongoing series	May 1964 – December 1968		Gold Key Comics		No
The Magilla Gorilla Show	Mushmouse and Punkin Puss	1 issue	One-shot	September 1965	?	Gold Key Comics		No
The Magilla Gorilla Show	Magilla Gorilla (1970)	5 issues	Ongoing series	November 1970 – July 1971	Joe Gill	Charlton Comics		No
The Magilla Gorilla Show	Hanna-Barbera Spotlight #4	1 issue	Main feature (part of an ongoing series)	May 1979	Reg Everbest	Marvel Comics	Magilla was the subject of the main feature story of this issue "Big Magilla in Space" (16 pages total), followed by a one-page prose story featuring Huckleberry Hound "Cute Kitty" and an eight-page back-up strip featuring Snagglepuss "Chunky Chiller", the latter also guest-featuring Huckleberry.	No
The Magilla Gorilla Show	Cartoon Network Presents #3, 8, 22	3 issues	Main feature, back-up feature (part of an ongoing series)	October 1997, May 1998, June 1999	Sam Henderson (#1), Mike Carlin (#8), Terry Collins (#22)	DC Comics	Magilla was featured in three self-contained stories; the following stories in order: "The Twiddle Method" (#1), "Magilla's Guerrillas!" (#8) and "Mighty Magilla" (#22); issue #1 guest featured characters from The Yogi Bear Show, Top Cat and Breezly and Sneezly and issue #8 guest-featured characters from The Peter Potamus Show, Space Ghost, The Herculoids and Dial M for Monkey (from Dexter's Laboratory).	No
The Magilla Gorilla Show	Nightwing/Magilla Gorilla Special	1 issue	One-shot	December 2018	Heath Corson, J.M DeMatteis	DC Comics	Crossover with DC's Nightwing; part of the DC Meets Hanna-Barbera comic book line.	
The Magilla Gorilla Show	Scooby-Doo Team Up #47: "Don't Get Mad, Scientist!"	1 issue	Main feature (part of an ongoing series)	March 27, 2019, May 2019 (cover date)	Sholly Fisch	DC Comics		
Man from Atlantis	Man from Atlantis	7 issues	Ongoing series	February – August 1978	Bill Mantlo, Mary Jo Duffy	Marvel Comics		No
The Man from U.N.C.L.E.	The Man from U.N.C.L.E. (1965)	22 issues	Ongoing series	May 1965 – April 1969	Paul S. Newman, Dick Wood	Gold Key Comics		No
The Man from U.N.C.L.E.	The Man from U.N.C.L.E. (1987)	22 issues	Ongoing series	January 1987 – September 1988	Skip Simpson, David M. Lynch, Stan Timmons, Glenn Magee, Paula Smith	TE Comics		No
The Man from U.N.C.L.E.	The Man from U.N.C.L.E.: The Birds of Prey Affair	2 issues	Limited series	March – September 1993	Mark Ellis	Millennium Publications		No
The Man from U.N.C.L.E.	Batman '66 Meets the Man from U.N.C.L.E.	6 issues	Limited series	February – July 2016	Jeff Parker	DC Comics	Crossover with Batman '66.	Hardcover: 1401264476 / 978-1401264475; Paperback: 1401268641 / 978-1401268640
Margie	Four Color (series 2) #1307	1 issue	One-shot	?	Dell Comics	March–May 1962	Tryout issue for a possible series.	No
Margie	Margie #2	1 issue	Ongoing series (planned)	?	Dell Comics	July–September 1962	The only issue of the main series overall, continued from Four Color #1307.	No
Married... with Children	Married... with Children (series 1)	7 issues	Limited series	June 1990 – February 1991	Katherine Llewellyn	NOW Comics		No
Married... with Children	Married... with Children (series 2)	7 issues	Ongoing series	September 1991 – April 1992	Katherine Llewellyn, Marc Hansen, Diane Pirton, Ty Addams	NOW Comics		No
The Marvel Action Hour	Marvel Action Hour Preview	1 issue	Ashcan comic	1994	Joey Cavalieri, Eric Fein	Marvel Comics		No
The Marvel Action Hour	Marvel Action Hour: Iron Man	8 issues	Ongoing series	November 1994 – June 1995	Eric Fein	Marvel Comics		No
The Marvel Action Hour	Marvel Action Hour: Fantastic Four	8 issues	Ongoing series	November 1994 – June 1995	Joey Cavalieri	Marvel Comics		No
M.A.S.K.	M.A.S.K. (series 1)	4 issues	Ongoing series	December 1985 – March 1986	Michael Fleisher	DC Comics		No
M.A.S.K.	M.A.S.K. (series 2)	9 issues	Ongoing series	February – October 1987	Michael Fleisher	DC Comics		No
The Mask: Animated Series	Adventures of the Mask	12 issues	Ongoing series	January – December 1996	Michael Eury	Dark Horse Comics		
Masked Rider	Masked Rider	1 issue	One-shot	April 1996	Frank Lovece	Marvel Comics	The main feature story "A Tale of Two Planets" (37 pages total), guest featuring the cast of Mighty Morphin Power Rangers.	No
Masked Rider	Saban Powerhouse #1, #2	2 issues	Comic story	Dan Slott	Acclaim Comics	October 1997	Two self-contained stories spanning two issues, the following stories in order: "90 Miles Per Horror!" (#1) and "Ferbus Crashes High Society!" (#2)	No
Maverick	Four Color (series 2) #892, #930, #945, #962, #980, #1005	19 issues	One-shot	April 1958, July 1958, October 1958, January 1959, April–June 1959, July–September 1959	Eric Freiwald, Robert Schaefer	Dell Comics	The first six issues are tryout issues for a possible series, published apart from each other.	No
Maverick	Maverick #7–19	19 issues	Ongoing series	October–December 1959 – April–June 1962	?	Dell Comics	The main series overall, continued from Four Color #1005.	No
McHale's Navy	McHale's Navy	3 issues	Ongoing series	May – November 1963		Dell Comics		
McKeever and the Colonel	McKeever and the Colonel	3 issues	Ongoing series	February – October 1963		Dell Comics		
Men into Space	Four Color (series 2) #1083	1 issue	One-shot	March–May 1960	Gaylord DuBois	Dell Comics	Tryout issue for a possible series that went unpublished.	No
Mickey Mouse	Mickey Mouse Shorts: Season One	4 issues	Ongoing series	July – October 2016	Paul Rudish	IDW Publishing		
The Mickey Mouse Club	Four Color (series 2) #707: "Walt Disney's Corky and White Shadow"	14 issues	One-shot	May 1956	?	Dell Comics	Main feature adapted from the eponymous TV serial (aired January 31 – February 22, 1956, for a total of 18 episodes); 34 pages total.	No
The Mickey Mouse Club	Four Color (series 2) #760, #830, #887, #964	14 issues		?	December 1956, August 1957, January 1958, January 1959	Dell Comics	All four issues related to the Hardy Boys TV serials that aired in five parts through seasons 1 and 2 of the series (episodes 8, 14, 18, 31 and 34, all respectively aired December 15, 1954 – December 14, 1955)	No
The Mickey Mouse Club	Four Color (series 2) #714, #767, #808, #1026 and #1082	14 issues		Eric Freiwald, Robert Schaefer	June 1956, February 1957, June 1957, September–November 1959, March–May 1960	Dell Comics	All four issues related to the Spin and Marty short series that aired in three self-contained serials (80 episodes total, all respectively aired November 4, 1955 – December 13, 1957); the first three installments were tryout issues for the eventual series, while the latter two installments were continuations after the regular series ended.	No
The Mickey Mouse Club	Four Color (series 2) #826: "Walt Disney's Spin and Marty and Annette"	14 issues		Eric Freiwald, Robert Schaefer	September 1957	Dell Comics	Continued from Four Color #808; the main feature story "The Pirates of Shell Island" (32 pages), preluded by a one-page illustration depicting the map of Shell Island and followed by a one-page non-fiction back-up feature "Workers Undersea" and a one-page illustration of Spin, Marty and Annette together.	No
The Mickey Mouse Club	Four Color (series 2) #889: "Walt Disney's Clint and Mac"	14 issues		?	March 1958	Dell Comics	Main feature adapted from the TV serial The Adventures of Clint and Mac (aired December 30, 1957 – January 17, 1958, for a total of 15 episodes); 32 pages total.	No
The Mickey Mouse Club	Four Color (series 2) #905: "Walt Disney's Annette"	14 issues		?	May 1958	Dell Comics	Main feature adapted from the TV serial Walt Disney Presents: Annette (aired February 10 – March 7, 1958, for a total of 19 episodes); 32 pages total.	No
The Mickey Mouse Club	Spin and Marty #5–9	5 issues	Ongoing series	?	March–May 1958 – March–May 1959	Dell Comics	Related to the Spin and Marty short form series; the main series overall, continued from Four Color #826.	No
Midnight Patrol: Adventures in the Dream Zone	The Beezer and Topper #87—153; The Dandy #2701—: "Potsworth & Co."		Main feature (part of an ongoing series)	May 16, 1992 – 1994	?	DC Thomson		No
The Mighty Hercules	The Mighty Hercules	2 issues	Ongoing series	July – November 1963	?	Gold Key Comics		No
The Mighty Heroes	The Mighty Heroes (1967)	4 issues	Ongoing series	March – July 1967	?	Dell Comics		No
The Mighty Heroes	The Mighty Heroes (1987)	1 issue	One-shot	1987	Joe Gill, Jim Main	Spotlight Comics		No
The Mighty Heroes	The Mighty Heroes (1998)	1 issue	One-shot	January 1998	Scott Lobdell	Marvel Comics	Published by Marvel under the imprint Paramount Comics.	No
Mighty Mouse: The New Adventures	Mighty Mouse	10 issues	Ongoing series	October 1990 – July 1991	Michael Gallagher, Glenn Herdling, Dan Slott	Marvel Comics		No
Millennium	Millennium	5 issues	Limited series	January – May 2015	Joe Harris	IDW Publishing		
Milton the Monster	Milton the Monster and Fearless Fly	1 issue	One-shot	May 1966	?	Gold Key Comics		No
Mission: Impossible	Mission: Impossible	5 issues	Ongoing series	May 1967 – October 1969	Paul S. Newman, Joe Gill	Dell Comics		No
Mister Ed	Four Color (series 2) #1295	1 issue	One-shot	March–May 1962	Paul S. Newman	Dell Comics	Tryout issue for the eventual series.	No
Mister Ed	Mister Ed, the Talking Horse	6 issues	Ongoing series	November 1962 – February 1964	Paul S. Newman	Gold Key Comics		No
Moby Dick and Mighty Mightor	Hanna-Barbera Super TV Heroes #1–7	7 issues	Back-up feature (part of an ongoing series)		April 1968, July 1968, October 1968, January 1969, May 1969, July 1969, September 1969	Gold Key Comics	Eleven self-contained stories spanning seven issues apart; Mightor was featured in six stories, "The Mighty Mightor Battles the Vampire King" (#1), "Beware! Skullarva!" (#2), "The Piper's Plot" (#4), "Multiplying Menace" (#5), "Idol of Fear" (#6) and "Wrath of Tazarr" (#7), while Moby Dick was featured in five stories, "Danger in the Deep" (#1), "Undersea Invasion" (#3), "The Yeast Beast" (#5), "Creature from Below" (#6) and "The Submarine Pirates" (#7).	No
The Mod Squad	The Mod Squad	8 issues	Ongoing series	January 1969 – April 1971		Dell Comics		No
The Monkees	The Monkees	17 issues	Ongoing series	March 1967 – October 1969		Dell Comics		No
The Monroes (1966)	The Monroes	1 issue	One-shot	April 1967	?	Dell Comics	Two self-contained stories featured in this issue: "The Bad Luck Boot" and "The "Tomb"", both run for a total of sixteen pages.	No
¡Mucha Lucha!	¡Mucha Lucha!	3 issues	Limited series	June – August 2003	Eddie Mort	DC Comics		No
The Munsters	The Munsters	16 issues	Ongoing series	January 1965 – February 1958		Gold Key Comics		No
Muppet Babies (1984)	Jim Henson's Muppet Babies	26	Ongoing series	May 1985 – July 1989		Marvel Comics	Published by Marvel under the imprint Star Comics.	
The Muppet Show (comics)	The Comic Muppet Book	1 volume	Graphic novel	1979	Jenny Craven (writer), Graham Thompson (illustrator)	Fontana Paperbacks	32 pages total.	
The Muppet Show (comics)	Muppets at Sea	1 volume	Graphic novel	1980	Jocelyn Stevenson (writer), Graham Thompson (illustrator)	Random House	32 pages total.	
The Muppet Show (comics)	Jim Henson's Muppets	1,714 installments	Newspaper strip	September 21, 1981 – May 31, 1986	Guy Gilchrist, Brad Gilchrist	King Features Syndicate		
The Muppet Show (comics)	The Muppet Show Comic Book (series 1)	4 issues	Limited series	March – June 2009	Roger Langridge	Boom! Studios		
The Muppet Show (comics)	Muppet Robin Hood	4 issues	Limited series	April – July 2009	Tim Beedle	Boom! Studios		
The Muppet Show (comics)	The Muppet Show Comic Book: The Treasure of Peg Leg Wilson	4 issues	Limited series	July – October 2009	Roger Langridge	Boom! Studios		
The Muppet Show (comics)	Muppet Peter Pan	4 issues	Limited series	August – November 2009	Grace Randolph	Boom! Studios		
The Muppet Show (comics)	The Muppet Show Comic Book (series 2)	15 issues	Ongoing series	November 2009 – March 2010	Roger Langridge	Boom! Studios	14 regular issues and an issue 0.	
The Muppet Show (comics)	Muppet King Arthur	4 issues	Limited series	December 2009 – March 2010	Paul Benjamin, Patrick Storck	Boom! Studios		
The Muppet Show (comics)	Muppet Snow White	4 issues	Limited series	April – August 2010	Jesse Blaze Snider, Patrick Storck	Boom! Studios		
The Muppet Show (comics)	Muppet Sherlock Holmes	4 issues	Limited series	August – November 2010	Patrick Storck	Boom! Studios		
Murder Drones	Murder Drones	TBA	TBA	TBA	Oni Press	TBA		
My Adventures with Superman	My Adventures with Superman	6 issues	Limited series	August 2024 – January 2025	Josie Campbell	DC Comics		
My Favorite Martian	My Favorite Martian	9 issues	Ongoing series	January 1964 – October 1966	Paul S. Newman	Gold Key Comics		No

== N ==
Based on	Title	Length	Format	Publication date	Authors	Publisher	Notes	Collected editions
Nanny and the Professor	Nanny and the Professor	2 issues	Ongoing series	August – October 1970		Dell Comics		No
National Velvet	National Velvet (series 1) #01-556-207, #12-556-210	2 issues		May–July 1962 – August–October 1962	Gaylord DuBois	Dell Comics		No
National Velvet	National Velvet (series 2)	2 issues		December 1962 – March 1963		Gold Key Comics		No
Neon Genesis Evangelion	Main article: Neon Genesis Evangelion (manga)							
The New Adventures of Charlie Chan	The New Adventures of Charlie Chan	6 issues	Ongoing series	May–June 1958 – March–April 1959	John Broome	DC Comics		No
The New Adventures of Huckleberry Finn	The New Adventures of Huck Finn	1 issue		December 1968		Gold Key Comics	Adaptation of the series' tenth overall episode "The Curse of Thut".	No
The New Adventures of Pinocchio	TV's New Adventures of Pinocchio	3 issues	Ongoing series	October–December 1962 – September–November 1963		Dell Comics		No
The New People	The New People	2 issues	Ongoing series	January – May 1970		Dell Comics		No
The Nurses	The Nurses	3 issues	Ongoing series	April – October 1963	Paul S. Newman	Gold Key Comics		No

== O ==
Based on	Title	Length	Format	Publication date	Authors	Publisher	Notes	Collected editions
Once Upon a Time	Once Upon a Time: Shadow of the Queen	1 volume	Graphic novel	September 2013	Dan Thomsen, Corinna Bechko	Marvel Comics		No
Once Upon a Time	Once Upon a Time: Out of the Past	1 volume	Graphic novel	April 2015	Kalinda Vazquez, Corinna Bechko	Marvel Comics		No
Orphan Black (comics)	Orphan Black	5 issues	Limited series	February – June 2015	Graeme Manson, John Fawcett, Jody Houser	IDW Publishing		Orphan Black TPB
Orphan Black (comics)	Orphan Black: Helsinki	5 issues	Limited series	November 2015 – March 2016	Graeme Manson, John Fawcett, Heli Kennedy	IDW Publishing		Orphan Black: Helsinki TPB
Orphan Black (comics)	Orphan Black: Deviations	6 issues	Limited series	March – August 2017	Heli Kennedy	IDW Publishing		Orphan Black: Deviations TPB
Orphan Black (comics)	Orphan Black: Crazy Science	1 issue	One-shot	June 2018	Heli Kennedy	IDW Publishing		
The Orville	The Orville: New Beginnings	4 issues	Limited series	July – October 2019	David A. Goodman	Dark Horse Comics		
The Orville	The Orville: Launch Day	4 issues	Limited series	September – December 2020	David A. Goodman	Dark Horse Comics		
The Orville	The Orville: Digressions	2 issues	Limited series	May – July 2021	David A. Goodman	Dark Horse Comics		
The Orville	The Orville: Artifacts	2 issues	Limited series	October – November 2021	David A. Goodman	Dark Horse Comics		
Our Miss Brooks	Four Color (series 2) #751	1 issue	One-shot	1956		Dell Comics		No
Over the Garden Wall	Over the Garden Wall Special	1 issue	One-shot	November 2014	Patrick McHale	Boom! Studios		
Over the Garden Wall	Over the Garden Wall (series 1)	4 issues	Limited series	August – November 2015	Patrick McHale	Boom! Studios		
Over the Garden Wall	Over the Garden Wall (series 2)	20 issues	Ongoing series	April 2016 – November 2017	Jim Campbell, Amalia Levari, George Mager, Kiernan Sjursen-Lien, Danielle Burgos	Boom! Studios		
Over the Garden Wall	Over the Garden Wall 2017 Special	1 issue	One-shot	September 2017	Jonathan Case, Gris Grimly, Samantha Glow Knapp	Boom! Studios		
Over the Garden Wall	Over the Garden Wall: Hollow Town	5 issues	Limited series	September 2018 – January 2019	Celia Lowenthal	Boom! Studios		
Over the Garden Wall	Over the Garden Wall: Distillatoria	1 volume	Graphic novel	November 2018	Jonathan Case	Boom! Studios		No
Over the Garden Wall	Over the Garden Wall: Soulful Symphonies	5 issues	Limited series	August 2019 – December 2019	Birdie Willis	Boom! Studios		
Over the Garden Wall	Over the Garden Wall: Circus Friends	1 volume	Graphic novel	October 2019	Jonathan Case	Boom! Studios		No
Over the Garden Wall	Over the Garden Wall: The Benevolent Sisters of Charity	1 volume	Graphic novel	October 2020	Sam Johns	Boom! Studios		No

== P ==
Based on	Title	Length	Format	Publication date	Authors	Publisher	Notes	Collected editions
Panty & Stocking with Garterbelt	Panty & Stocking with Garterbelt	—N/a	1 volume	August 4, 2010 – June 4, 2011	—N/a	Kadokawa Shoten / Dark Horse Comics / Newtype		No
The Partridge Family	The Partridge Family	21 issues	Ongoing series	March 1971 – November 1973	Don Sherwood, R.J. Simpson	Charlton Comics		No
The Pebbles and Bamm-Bamm Show	Pebbles and Bamm-Bamm	36 issues	Ongoing series	January 1972 – December 1976	?	Charlton Comics		No
Penny Dreadful	Penny Dreadful (series 1)	5 issues	Limited series	May – November 2016	Krysty Wilson-Cairns, Andrew Hinderaker, Chris King	Titan Comics		
Penny Dreadful	Penny Dreadful (series 2)	12 issues	Ongoing series	May 2017 – December 2018	Chris King	Titan Comics		
Perry Mason (1957)	Perry Mason	2 issues	Ongoing series	June–August 1964 – October–December 1964	Ken Fitch	Dell Comics	Quarterly publication; issue 2 adapted from season 1, episode 5 ("The Case of the Sulky Girl", aired October 19, 1957).	No
Peter Gunn	Four Color (series 2) #1087	1 issue	One-shot	April–June 1960	Paul S. Newman	Dell Comics		No
The Peter Potamus Show	Peter Potamus	1 issue	One-shot	January 1965	?	Gold Key Comics		No
The Peter Potamus Show	Hanna-Barbera Parade #1: "Dr. Monk's Magic Diet"	1 issue	Comic story	September 1971	Phil Mendez	Charlton Comics		No
The Peter Potamus Show	Cartoon Network Presents #12: "Peter Potamus on the Bizarre-O World!"	1 issue	One-shot	August 1998	Sam Henderson	DC Comics		No
Petticoat Junction	Petticoat Junction	5 issues	Ongoing series	December 1964 – October 1965	?	Dell Comics		No
Phantom 2040	Phantom 2040	4 issues	Limited series	May – August 1995	Peter Quinones	Marvel Comics		No
The Phil Silvers Show	Sgt. Bilko	18 issues	Ongoing series	June 1957 – April 1960	Jack Schiff	DC Comics		No
The Phil Silvers Show	Sgt. Bilko's Pvt. Doberman	11 issues	Ongoing series	June 1957 – March 1960	Cal Howard	DC Comics	Spin-off of the main ongoing series centering on the supporting character played by Maurice Gosfield.	No
The Phil Silvers Show	TV Century 21 #139–154	15 issues	Main feature, ongoing series	September 16, 1967 – December 30, 1967	?	City Magazines		No
Phineas and Ferb	Phineas and Ferb Magazine #12—21	10 issues	Ongoing series	October 2012 – November 2013		Disney Publishing Worldwide		
Pinky and the Brain	Pinky and the Brain Christmas Special	1 issue	One-shot	January 1996	David Cody Weiss, Bobbi JG Weiss	DC Comics		No
Pinky and the Brain	Pinky and the Brain	27 issues	Ongoing series	July 1996 – November 1998	David Cody Weiss, Bobbi JG Weiss, Dana Kurtin, Dan Slott, Jesse Leon McCann, Shaun McLaughlin	DC Comics		No
The Pirates of Dark Water	The Pirates of Dark Water	9 issues	Limited series	November 1991 – July 1992	Dwight Jon Zimmerman	Marvel Comics		No
Police Academy	Police Academy: The Comic Book	6 issues	Ongoing series	October 1989 – February 1990	Angelo DeCesare	Marvel Comics		No
Power Rangers (comics)	Mighty Morphin Power Rangers (series 1)	6 issues	Limited series	December 1994 – May 1995	Donald D. Markstein, Jack C. Harris	Hamilton Comics		
Power Rangers (comics)	Mighty Morphin Power Rangers (series 2)	4 issues	Limited series	June – September 1995	Donald D. Markstein (#1, #4), Nat Gertler (#1, #3), Jack C. Harris (#2), Michael T. Gilbert (#4)	Hamilton Comics		
Power Rangers (comics)	Mighty Morphin Power Rangers Saga	3 issues	Limited series	August – October 1995		Hamilton Comics		
Power Rangers (comics)	Mighty Morphin Power Rangers (1995)	7 issues	Ongoing series	November 1995 – May 1996	Fabian Nicieza (#1, #2, #4, #5, #6), Scott Lobdell (#1, #3, ), Frank Lovece (#2), Barry Dutter (#3, #5, #6), Tom Danning (#4), Grant Miehiem (#7), Darick Robertson (#7)	Marvel Comics		
Power Rangers (comics)	Mighty Morphin Power Rangers: Ninja Rangers	5 issues	Limited series	December 1995 – April 1996	Fabian Nicieza	Marvel Comics		
Power Rangers (comics)	Power Rangers Zeo	1 issue	Ongoing series (planned)	August 1996		Image Comics		No
Power Rangers (comics)	Saban Powerhouse #1: "Power Rangers Turbo: Into the Fire and Other Stories"	1 issue	Comic story	October 1997	Robert L. Washington III	Acclaim Comics		
Power Rangers (comics)	Saban Powerhouse Special: "Power Rangers Turbo vs. Beetleborgs Metallix"	1 issue	One-shot	October 1997	Robert L. Washington III	Acclaim Comics/Valiant Comics	Crossover with Beetleborgs Metallix.	
Power Rangers (comics)	Saban Powerhouse #2: "Power Rangers Turbo: Simple Simon Says and Other Stories"	1 issue	Comic story	October 1997	Dan Slott	Acclaim Comics		
Power Rangers (comics)	Mighty Morphin Power Rangers (volume 1)	56 issues	Ongoing series	January 2016 – October 2020	Kyle Higgins, Marguerite Bennett, Ryan Parrott	Boom! Studios	55 regular issues and an issue #0.	
Power Rangers (comics)	Mighty Morphin Power Rangers: Pink	6 issues	Limited series	June 2016 – January 2017	Brendan Fletcher, Kelly Thompson, Tini Howard	Boom! Studios		
Power Rangers (comics)	Justice League/Mighty Morphin Power Rangers	6 issues	Limited series	March – November 2017	Tom Taylor	DC Comics/Boom! Studios	Crossover with DC's Justice League.	
Power Rangers (comics)	Mighty Morphin Power Rangers: Shattered Grid	1 issue	One-shot	August 2018	Kyle Higgins	Boom! Studios		
Power Rangers (comics)	Godzilla vs. Mighty Morphin Power Rangers	5 issues	Limited series	December 2019 – June 2020	Cullen Bunn	IDW Publishing/Boom! Studios	First crossover with Toho's Godzilla.	
Power Rangers (comics)	Power Rangers: Drakkon – New Dawn	3 issues	Limited series	August – October 2020	Anthony Burch	Boom! Studios		
Power Rangers (comics)	Mighty Morphin Power Rangers/Teenage Mutant Ninja Turtles	6 issues	Limited series	March – July 2022	Ryan Parrott	IDW Publishing/Boom! Studios	Five regular issues and an issue #0; first crossover with the Teenage Mutant Ninja Turtles.	
Power Rangers (comics)	Mighty Morphin Power Rangers (volume 2) #100–present	22 issues	Ongoing series	September 2022 – July 2024	Melissa Flores	Boom! Studios		
Power Rangers (comics)	Mighty Morphin Power Rangers/Teenage Mutant Ninja Turtles II	5 issues	Limited series	December 2022 – May 2023	Ryan Parrott	IDW Publishing/Boom! Studios	Second crossover with the Teenage Mutant Ninja Turtles.	
Power Rangers (comics)	Mighty Morphin Power Rangers: The Return	4 issues	Limited series	February – May 2024	Amy Jo Johnson, Matt Hotson	Boom! Studios		
Power Rangers (comics)	Godzilla vs. Mighty Morphin Power Rangers II	5 issues	Limited series	April – September 2024	Cullen Bunn	IDW Publishing/Boom! Studios	Second crossover with Toho's Godzilla and sequel to the first crossover.	
The Powerpuff Girls (1998)	Cartoon Network Starring #1, 5	2 issues	Main feature (part of an ongoing series)	September 1999, January 2000	Craig McCracken (#1, 5), Genndy Tartakovsky (#1)	DC Comics	Two self-contained stories spanning two issues apart, the following stories in order: "Snack in the Face" (#1) and "Black and Blue Period" (#5), both run for a total of 22 pages.	
The Powerpuff Girls (1998)	The Powerpuff Girls (2000)	70 issues	Ongoing series	May 2000 – March 2006	Jennifer Moore (#1, 3, 5, 8, 11, 17, 19, 20, 23, 25, 26, 28, 29, 31, 33, 38, 44, 49, 65, 66, 68), Sean Carolan (#1, 3, 5, 8, 11, 17, 19, 20, 23, 25, 26, 28, 29, 31, 33, 38, 44, 49, 65, 66, 68), Abby Denson (#2, 4, 10, 12, 15, 16, 26, 29, 37, 52, 54, 55, 56, 64), John Rozum (#6, 14, 22, 41, 64, 66, 67, 68, 69), Chuck Kim (#7, 56), Chris Savino (#9), Amy Keating Rogers (#9, 50, 54, 58, 59, 63, 65, 67, 68), Bobbi JG Weiss (#13), Frank Strom (#13, 21, 30, 56, 57), Trina Robbins (#15, 16, 22), Brett Lewis (#18, 27), Ivan Velez, Jr. (#24, 32, 43, 52, 57, 59, 60, 61), Ian Boothby (#28, 29, 40, 46, 48, 53), Bronwyn Carlton (#30), Sheryl Scarborough (#33, 39), Kayte Kuch (#33), Dan Slott (#34), Roger Fredericks (#34), Robbie Busch (#35, 36, 39, 41, 42, 45, 46, 47, 48, 49, 51, 52, 55, 56, 58, 62, 63, 64), Chuck Kim (#36), William Messner-Loebs (#56), Jon Lewis (#57, 62, 66), Sholly Fisch (#58, 68), Christina Z (#63)	DC Comics	Regular series technically ended in February 2006 after a total of 69 issues; the real final issue was a reprint of the first issue.	
The Powerpuff Girls (1998)	Cartoon Network Block Party! #19, 20, 21, 23, 26, 28, 31, 36, 37, 41, 42, 43, 45, 46, 48, 49, 50, 55, 57, 58, 59	21 issues	Main feature, back-up feature (part of an ongoing series)	May 2006, June 2006, July 2006, September 2006, December 2006, February 2007, May 2007, October 2007, November 2007, March 2008, April 2008, May 2008, July 2008, August 2008, October 2008, November 2008, December 2008, May 2009, July 2009, August 2009, September 2009	Scott Roberts (#19, 21), Robbie Busch (#20, 41, 43, 49), Amy Keating Rogers (#23, 31, 36, 37, 50, 58, 59), Frank Strom (#26, 28), John Rozum (#42, 45, 48, 55), Abby Denson (#46), Sam Agro (#57)	DC Comics	The Powerpuff Girls moved into this title as a regular feature following the cancellation of the ongoing series run in March 2006; twenty-one stories spanned in twenty-one issues apart; the following stories in order: "To Love Some Bunny" (#19), "The Big Green Monster" (#20), "Lab Partners" (#21), "The MP Three" (#23), "Steal a Meal" (#26), "Stubble and Fall" (#28), "Mayor Minor" (#31), "Professor Mom" (#36), "Sounding Off" (#37), "Amoeba? I Don't Even Know Ya!" (#41), "Gather No Moths" (#42), "The Devil's Playground" (#43), "Repeating Robots" (#45), "Musclebound Monster" (#46), "Too Close for Comfort" (#48), "Bad Bad Badminton" (#49), "Statue of Limitations" (#50), "Special Formula!" (#50), "Trouble Bogie" (#57), "Triple Threat" (#58) and "Smart & Smarter" (#59).	
The Powerpuff Girls (1998)	Cartoon Network Action Pack! #1, 2, 6	3 issues	Back-up feature (part of an ongoing series)	July 2006, August 2006, December 2006	Abby Denson (#1), Robbie Busch (#2, 6)	DC Comics	Three self-contained stories spanning three issues apart, the following stories in order: "Anything Boys Can Do, Squirrels Can Do Better" (#1, 4 pages), "Father Knows Worst" (#2, 6 pages) and "Root of All Cooties" (#6, 4 pages); the two shorter stories in between focus exclusively on the minor antagonists, the Rowdyruff Boys.	
The Powerpuff Girls (1998)	The Powerpuff Girls (2013)	10 issues	Ongoing series	September 2013 – June 2014	Troy Little (#1–6, 9–10), Derek Charm (#7–8)	IDW Publishing		
The Powerpuff Girls (1998)	The Powerpuff Girls: Super Smash-Up!	5 issues	Limited series	January – May 2015	Derek Charm (#1–5), Jeremy Whitley (#1), Sean Williams (#2), Rachel Deering (#3), Ivan Cohen (#4), Mariah Huehner (#5)	IDW Publishing	Continuation of the earlier IDW limited series Super Secret Crisis War!, this series finds the Powerpuff Girls travelling through the multiverse through various Cartoon Network shows including Dexter's Laboratory (#1), Courage the Cowardly Dog (#2), Cow and Chicken (#3), Foster's Home for Imaginary Friends (#4) and back to their own universe for a final confrontation with Mojo Jojo (#5); the series also features back-up stories in each individual issue, each one based on one of the CN shows in order: Courage (#1), Foster's (#2), Billy & Mandy (#3), The Powerpuff Girls (#4, centering on Mojo Jojo) and Dexter's Laboratory (#5) respectively.	
The Powerpuff Girls (2016)	The Powerpuff Girls (2016)	6 issues	Limited series	July – December 2016	Haley Mancini, Jake Goldman	IDW Publishing		
The Powerpuff Girls (2016)	The Powerpuff Girls: The Bureau of Bad	3 issues	Limited series	November 2017 – January 2018	Haley Mancini, Jake Goldman	IDW Publishing		
The Powerpuff Girls (2016)	The Powerpuff Girls: The Time Tie	3 issues	Limited series	May – July 2017	Haley Mancini, Jake Goldman	IDW Publishing		
The Prisoner	The Prisoner: Shattered Visage Books A–D	4 issues	Limited series	December 1988 – February 1989	Dean Motter, Mark Askwith	DC Comics		
The Prisoner	The Prisoner (2018)	4 issues	Limited series	April – September 2018	Peter Milligan	Titan Comics		
ProStars	NBC Saturday Morning Comics #1: "Brazil Nuts"	1 issue	Main feature	September 1991	?	Harvey Comics	Adaptation of the series' eponymous sixth overall episode.	No
A Pup Named Scooby-Doo	Hanna-Barbera Presents #5	1 issue	One-shot	July 1996	Bill Matheny	Harvey Comics	Two self-contained stories in this issue: "The Pizza Delivery from Beyond" (11 pages) and "Daphne Has Risen from the Grave" (11 pages).	No

== Q ==
Based on	Title	Length	Format	Publication date	Authors	Publisher	Notes	Collected editions
Quantum Leap	Quantum Leap	13 issues	Ongoing series	September 1991 – July 1993	George Broderick, Jr., John Holland, Steven Dorfman, Terry Collins, Becky Broderick, Charles Marshall, Ted Slampyak, Bill Spangler, Andy Mangels, Peter Quinones, Bruce Scalet, Scott Rockwell, Christine Hantzopulos-Hunt	Innovation Publishing		
Queer as Folk	Rage: Gay Crusader	1 issue	One-shot	March 2002		Red Cape Comics		No
The Quick Draw McGraw Show	Four Color (series 2) #1040: "Quick Draw McGraw"	15 issues	One-shot	December 1959-February 1960		Dell Comics	The first issue was a tryout issue for the eventual series.	
The Quick Draw McGraw Show	Quick Draw McGraw (1960) #2–15	15 issues	Ongoing series	April–June 1960 – 1969		Dell Comics, Gold Key Comics	The main series overall, continued from Four Color #1040; the first eleven issues were published by Dell and the remainder of the series by Gold Key Comics from #12 (October–November 1962).	
The Quick Draw McGraw Show	Hanna-Barbera Band Wagon #1, 2, 3	3 issues	Back-up feature (part of an ongoing series)	October 1962, January 1963, April 1963	?	Gold Key Comics	Snooper and Blabber and Augie Doggie and Doggie Daddy were both featured in back-up stories in all three issues of this title; Snooper and Blabber were seen in four strips: "Airtight Mystery" and "Dual Control" (#1), an untitled one-page strip and one officially titled eight page story "The Case of the Panicky Pirates" (both #2), and "All's Swell That Ends Swell" (#3) and Augie Doggie had two strips: "King Arfer's Wee Knight" (#1) and "Something to Crow About" (#2). Mr. & Mrs. J. Evil Scientist, recurring characters from the Snooper and Blabber segment, made their first comic appearance in an untitled Snagglepuss story in #2 and were featured in their own six-page back-up feature strip "All in Favor, Growl 'Aye'!" in #3.	
The Quick Draw McGraw Show	Snooper and Blabber, Detectives	3 issue	Ongoing series	November 1962 – May 1963		Gold Key Comics		
The Quick Draw McGraw Show	Augie Doggie	1 issue	One-shot	October 1963	?	Gold Key Comics	Four self-contained stories featured Augie Doggie and Doggie Daddy: "Frontier Fracas" (8 pages), "Night Watchdog" (6 pages), "The Last Lap" (5 pages) and "Autograph Hound" (6 pages), bookended by two "Keys of Knowledge" pages inside front and back cover: "Domestic Animals, Number 9: The Cocker Spaniel" and "Fish, Number 16: Sea Horse"; the latter two back-up stories are alternated between by a one-page Pixie and Dixie and Mr. Jinks prose story ("Champion Sugar-Bowlers") and a Yakky Doodle back-up strip ("Will the Real Yakky Doodle Please Stand Up", 6 pages), plus a pin-up illustration of the book cover.	
The Quick Draw McGraw Show	Mr. and Mrs. J. Evil Scientist	4 issues	Ongoing series	November 1963 – September 1966			Annual publication for the Halloween season.	
The Quick Draw McGraw Show	Quick Draw McGraw (1970)	8 issues	Ongoing series	November 1970 – January 1972		Charlton Comics		
The Quick Draw McGraw Show	Hanna-Barbera Spotlight #2	1 issue	Main feature, back-up feature (part of an ongoing series)	September 1978	Mark Evanier	Marvel Comics	Quick Draw McGraw, Snooper and Blabber and Augie Doggie and Doggie Daddy were all featured individually in three stories in this issue; Quick Draw in "El Kabong Rides Again!" which is the main feature, Snooper and Blabber in "Bounce to the Ounce" and Augie Doggie in "A Penny Saved", both latter are back-up features.	
The Quick Draw McGraw Show	Hanna-Barbera Presents #4	1 issue	One-shot	May 1996	Bill Matheny, Laren Bright	Archie Comics	Quick Draw McGraw was featured in two self-contained stories in this issue: "The Good, the Brat, and the Ugly" and "The Most Wanted Ape in the West", the latter guest featuring Magilla Gorilla (from his eponymous series).	
The Quick Draw McGraw Show	Cartoon Network Presents #6	3 issues	Main feature, back-up feature (part of an ongoing series)	January 1998, December 1998, June 1999	Sam Henderson (#6, 16), Terry Collins (#22)	DC Comics	Three self-contained stories based on two of the three regular segments from the series spaning three select issues: "La Dia de los Kabongs" (#6) and "Night of the Iron Horse" (#22) are both Quick Draw McGraw stories, "Stray Pets" (#16) is an Augie Doggie and Doggie Daddy story.	
The Quick Draw McGraw Show	Scooby-Doo Team-Up #23: "Go West, You Meddling Kids"	1 issue	Main feature (part of an ongoing series)	February 22, 2017, April 2017 (cover date)	Sholly Fisch	DC Comics		

== R ==
Based on	Title	Length	Format	Publication date	Authors	Publisher	Notes	Collected editions
Rainbow Brite (1984)	Rainbow Brite	5 issues	Limited series	October 2018 – March 2019	Jeremy Whitley	Dynamite Entertainment		
The Range Rider	Four Color (series 2) #404	1 issue	One-shot	June 1952	?	Dell Comics		No
The Range Rider	The Flying A's Range Rider #2–24	23 issues	Ongoing series	June–August 1953 – December 1958-February 1959		Dell Comics	Quarterly publication.	No
Rango	Rango	1 issue	One-shot	August 1967	?	Dell Comics		No
The Rat Patrol	The Rat Patrol	6 issues	Ongoing series	March 1967 – October 1969		Dell Comics		No
The Real Adventures of Jonny Quest	Jonny Quest: The Real Adventures	12 issues	Ongoing series	September 1996 – September 1997	Kate Worsley (#1–4, #8, #10–11), Shaun McLaughlin (#5–7), Craig Boldman (#5), Tom Bierbaum (#8–11), Barbara Kesel (#9), Mary Bierbaum (#10–11), James Vance (#12)	Dark Horse Comics		No
The Real Ghostbusters (comics)
The Real Ghostbusters (comics)	The Real Ghostbusters (UK)	193 issues	Ongoing series	March 1988 – March 1992		Marvel UK		
The Real Ghostbusters (comics)	The Real Ghostbusters (volume 1)	28 issues	Ongoing series	August 1988 – December 1990		NOW Comics		
The Real Ghostbusters (comics)	The Real Ghostbusters (volume 2)	4 issues	Limited series	November 1991 – February 1992		NOW Comics		
The Real Ghostbusters (comics)	Mars Attacks the Real Ghostbusters	1 issue	One-shot	January 2013	Erik Burnham	IDW Publishing	Crossover with Mars Attacks.	
The Real Ghostbusters (comics)	Ghostbusters: Get Real	4 issues	Limited series	June – September 2015	Erik Burnham	IDW Publishing	Crossover with the film series counterparts.	
The Real Ghostbusters (comics)	Ghostbusters 35th Anniversary: The Real Ghostbusters	1 issue	One-shot	April 2019	Cavan Scott	IDW Publishing		
The Real McCoys	Four Color (series 2) #1071, #1134	2 issues	One-shot	January–March 1960, September–November 1960		Dell Comics		No
The Real McCoys	The Real McCoys #01-689-207	1 issue	One-shot	May–July 1962		Dell Comics		No
The Rebel	Four Color (series 2) #1076, #1138, #1207, #1262	4 issues	One-shot	February–April 1960, October–December 1960, September–November 1961, December 1961-February 1962	Gaylord Du Bois	Dell Comics		No
Regular Show	Regular Show	40 issues	Ongoing series	April 2013 – October 2016	K.C. Green, Jeremy Lawson, Pranas Naujokaitis, Nick Sumida, Minty Lewis, J.G. Quintel, Rachel Conner, Kevin Church, Kevin Burkhalter, Madeline Rupert, Clark Burscough, Shanna Matuszak, Jon Morris, Eddie Wright, Ulises Farinas, Erick Freitas, Ryan Ferrier	Boom! Studios		
Regular Show	Regular Show: Skips	6 issues	Limited series	November 2013 – April 2014	Madeline Rupert	Boom! Studios		
Regular Show	Regular Show: 2015 March Madness Special	1 issue	One-shot	March 2015	Shanna Matusza, Lee Knox Ostertag, Kevin Panetta, Kristina Ness	Boom! Studios		
Regular Show	Regular Show: 2017 Special	1 issue	One-shot	April 2017	Derek Fridolfs, Sara Goetter, Kristin Kemper, Hanna Blumenreich, Alex Solis and Ellen Kramer	Boom! Studios		
Regular Show	Adventure Time/Regular Show	6 issues	Limited series	August 2017 – January 2018	Conor McCreery	Boom! Studios	Crossover with Adventure Time.	
Regular Show	Regular Show: 25 Years Later	6 issues	Limited series	June – November 2018	Christopher Hastings	Boom! Studios		
Regular Show	Regular Show: 2018 Special	1 issue	One-shot	February 2018	Conor McCreery	Boom! Studios		
The Ren & Stimpy Show	The Ren & Stimpy Show	44 issues	Ongoing series	December 1992 – July 1996	Dan Slott	Marvel Comics		No
The Restless Gun	Four Color (series 2) #934, #986, #1045, #1089, #1146	5 issues	One-shots	September 1958, November 1959-January 1960, April–June 1959, April 1960, November 1960-January 1961		Dell Comics		No
Rick and Morty	Main article: Rick and Morty (comics)							
The Rifleman	Four Color (series 2) #1009	1 issue	One-shot	July–September 1959	Eric Freiwald, Robert Schaefer	Dell Comics		No
The Rifleman	The Rifleman #2—20	19 issues	Ongoing series	January–March 1960 – October 1964		Dell Comics, Gold Key Comics		No
Rise of the Teenage Mutant Ninja Turtles	Rise of the Teenage Mutant Ninja Turtles	6 issues	Limited series	July 2018 – January 2019	Matthew K. Manning	IDW Publishing	Five regular issues and an issue #0.	
Rise of the Teenage Mutant Ninja Turtles	Rise of the Teenage Mutant Ninja Turtles: Sound Off!	3 issues	Limited series	July – September 2019	Matthew K. Manning	IDW Publishing		
Riverdale	Riverdale: One-Shot	1 issue	One-shot	April 2017	Roberto Aguirre-Sacasa	Archie Comics		
Riverdale	Riverdale	17 issues	Ongoing series	May 2017 – July 2018	Will Ewing, Michael Grassi, Greg Murray, Daniel King, Roberto Aguirre-Sacasa, James Dewillie, Tessa Leigh Williams, Brian E. Peterson, Ross Maxwell, Aaron Allen	Archie Comics		
Riverdale	Riverdale: Season 3	5 issues	Limited series	May – September 2019	Micol Ostow	Archie Comics		
Riverdale	Riverdale Presents: South Side Serpents	1 issue	One-shot	March 2021	David Barnett	Archie Comics		
Riverdale	Archie Meets Riverdale	1 issue	One-shot	June 2022	Daniel Kibblesmith	Archie Comics	Crossover with the original Archie, the basis from which the TV series originated.	
Robin of Sherwood	Look-in #18–39	21 issues	Comic story, serial	April 1984 – September 1986	Angus Allan	ITV		
Robotech	Main article: Robotech (comics)							
Robotix	Robotix	1 issue	One-shot	February 1986	Herb Trimpe	Marvel Comics		No
Rocko's Modern Life	Rocko's Modern Life (1994)	7 issues	Limited series	June – December 1994	John Lewandowski, Joey Cavalieri	Marvel Comics		
Rocko's Modern Life	Rocko's Modern Life (2017)	8 issues	Limited series	December 2017 – September 2018	Ryan Ferrier, K.C. Green, David DeGrand, Tony Millionaire, Marie Enger	Boom! Studios		
Rocko's Modern Life	Rocko's Modern Afterlife	4 issues	Limited series	April – July 2019	Anthony Burch	Boom! Studios		
The Roman Holidays	The Roman Holidays	4 issues	Ongoing series	November 1972 – August 1973		Gold Key Comics		No
Room 222	Room 222	4 issues	Ongoing series	January 1970 – January 1971		Dell Comics		No
The Rootie Kazootie Club	Four Color (series 2) #415, #459, #502	3 issues	One-shot	August 1952, April 1953, October 1953	?	Dell Comics		No
The Rootie Kazootie Club	Rootie Kazootie #4—6	3 issues	Ongoing series	June – December 1954		Dell Comics		No
The Ruff and Reddy Show	Four Color (series 2) #937, #981, #1038	3 issues	One-shot	September 1958, April–June 1959, October–December 1959		Dell Comics		No
The Ruff and Reddy Show	Ruff and Reddy #4—12	9 issues	Ongoing series	January–March 1960 – January–March 1962		Dell Comics		No
The Ruff and Reddy Show	Hanna-Barbera Band Wagon #1, 2	3 issues	Back-up feature (part of an ongoing series)	October 1962, January 1963	?	Gold Key Comics	Ruff and Reddy were both featured in back-up stories in two issues of this title; "The Small Fry" (#1, four pages total) and "Tappy Days Are Here Again" (#2, six pages total).	
The Ruff and Reddy Show	The Ruff and Reddy Show	6 issues	Limited series	December 2017 – May 2018	Howard Chaykin	DC Comics	Part of the Hanna-Barbera Beyond comic book line.	
Rugrats	Rugrats (1996)	1 issue	One-shot	May 1996	Bambos, David Leach	Marvel Comics		No
Rugrats	Rugrats Comic Adventures (volume 1)	10 issues	Ongoing series	November 1997 – August 1998		Nickelodeon		No
Rugrats	Rugrats Comic Adventures (volume 2)	10 issues	Ongoing series	October 1998 – July 1999		Nickelodeon		No
Rugrats	Rugrats Comic Adventures (volume 3)	10 issues	Ongoing series	2000 – 2001		Nickelodeon		No
Rugrats	Rugrats (2017)	8 issues	Limited series	October 2017 – May 2018	Box Brown, Pranas T. Naujokaitis	Boom! Studios		
Rugrats	Rugrats: R is for Reptar Special	1 issue	One-shot	April 2018	Nicole Andelfinger	Boom! Studios		
Rugrats	Rugrats: C Is For Chanukah Special	1 issue	One-shot	November 2018	Cullen Crawford, Daniel Kibblesmith	Boom! Studios		
Run, Buddy, Run!	Run, Buddy, Run!	1 issue	One-shot	June 1967		Gold Key Comics		No
RWBY	RWBY	7 issues	Limited series	December 2019 – April 2020	Marguerite Bennett	DC Comics		
RWBY	RWBY x Justice League	7 issues	Limited series	June – December 2021	Marguerite Bennett	DC Comics		
RWBY	DC/RWBY	7 issues	Limited series	April – October 2023	Marguerite Bennett	DC Comics		

== S ==
Based on	Title	Length	Format	Publication date	Authors	Publisher	Notes	Collected editions
Saber Rider and the Star Sheriffs	Saber Rider and the Star Sheriffs	4 issues	Limited series	March – June 2016	Mairghread Scott	Lion Forge Comics		No
Samson & Goliath	Hanna-Barbera Super TV Heroes #1, 3	2 issues	Comic story	Gold Key Comics		April 1968, October 1968	Two self-contained stories published two select issues apart, the following stories in order: "The Magnetic Menace" (#1) and "The Cosmic Werewolf" (#2) respectively.	No
Samurai Jack (comics)	Samurai Jack (2002)	nn		September 2002	Genndy Tartakovsky	DC Comics		
Samurai Jack (comics)	Samurai Jack (2013)	20 issues	Ongoing series	October 2013 – May 2015	Jim Zub, Andy Suriano	IDW Publishing		Samurai Jack: Tales of the Wandering Warrior TPB
Samurai Jack (comics)	Samurai Jack: Quantum Jack	5 issues	Limited series	September 2017 – January 2018	Fabian Rangel, Jr.	IDW Publishing		Samurai Jack: Quantum Jack TPB
Samurai Jack (comics)	Samurai Jack: Lost Worlds	4 issues	Limited series	April – July 2019	Paul Allor	IDW Publishing		Samurai Jack: Lost Worlds TPB
Saved by the Bell	Saved by the Bell	5 issues	Ongoing series	May 1992 – May 1993	Angelo DeCesare	Harvey Comics		
Scooby-Doo	Main article: List of Scooby-Doo media § Comic books							
Sea Hunt	Four Color (series 2) #928, 994, 1041	13 issues	One-shot	August 1958, May 1959, October–December 1959		Dell Comics		No
Sea Hunt	Sea Hunt #4–13	13 issues	Ongoing series	January–March 1960 – April–June 1962	Eric Freiwald, Robert Schaefer	Dell Comics		No
Sectaurs: Warriors of Symbion	Sectaurs: Warriors of Symbion	8 issues	Limited series	June 1985 – September 1986	Bill Mantlo	Marvel Comics		No
Shazzan	Hanna-Barbera Super TV Heroes #2, 3, 4, 5	4 issues	Comic story	July 1968, October 1968, January 1969, May 1969	Carl Fallberg (#2), Don R. Christensen (#3, 4)	Gold Key Comics	Four self-contained stories published in four select issues apart, the following stories in order: "The Diamond of Doom" (#2), "Terrors of Turaba" (#3), "The Mind-Master" (#4) and "Curse of the Cloud-Wizard" (#5) respectively.	No
The Shield	The Shield: Spotlight	5 issues	Limited series	January – May 2004	Jeff Mariotte	IDW Publishing		
Shotgun Slade	Four Color (series 2) #1111	1 issue	One-shot	July–September 1960		Dell Comics	The issue features three self-contained stories in the following order, "Outpost Outlaws" (18 pages), "Cowtown" (14 pages) and "The Clue Trail" (1 page).	No
SilverHawks	SilverHawks (1987)	7 issues	Ongoing series	August 1987 – August 1988	Steve Perry	Star Comics		No
The Simpsons	Main article: List of The Simpsons comics							
Sinbad Jr. and his Magic Belt	Sinbad Jr.	3 issues	Ongoing series	September 1965 – May 1966		Dell Comics		No
Sítio do Picapau Amarelo (1977)	Main article: Sítio do Picapau Amarelo (comics)							
The Six Million Dollar Man	The Six Million Dollar Man (1976)	9 issues	Ongoing series	June 1976 – June 1978	Joe Gill, Nicola Cuti	Charlton Comics		
The Six Million Dollar Man	The Six Million Dollar Man: Season Six	6 issues	Limited series	March – September 2014	James Kuhoric	Dynamite Entertainment		The Six Million Dollar Man: Season Six TPB
The Six Million Dollar Man	The Six Million Dollar Man: Fall of Man	5 issues	Limited series	July – November 2016	Van Jensen	Dynamite Entertainment		The Six Million Dollar Man: Fall of Man TPB
The Six Million Dollar Man	G.I. Joe vs. The Six Million Dollar Man	4 issues	Limited series	February – May 2018	Ryan Ferrier	Dynamite Entertainment	Crossover with Hasbro's G.I. Joe: A Real American Hero; co-published with IDW Publishing.	G.I. Joe vs. The Six Million Dollar Man TPB
The Six Million Dollar Man	The Six Million Dollar Man (2019)	5 issues	Limited series	March – July 2019	Christopher Hastings	Dynamite Entertainment		The Six Million Dollar Man in Japan TPB
Skeleton Warriors	Skeleton Warriors	4 issues	Ongoing series	April – July 1995	Adam Bezark, Ty Granaroli	Marvel Comics		No
Sliders	Sliders	2 issues	Limited series	June – July 1996	D.G. Chichester	Acclaim Comics/Armada		No
Sliders	Sliders: Ultimatum	2 issues	Limited series	August – September 1996	D.G. Chichester	Acclaim Comics/Armada		No
Sliders	Sliders: Darkest Hour	3 issues	Limited series	October – November 1996	D.G. Chichester	Acclaim Comics/Armada		No
Sliders	Sliders Special	3 issues	Limited series	November 1996 – March 1997	Jerry O'Connell, Tracy Torme, D.G. Chichester	Acclaim Comics/Armada	Anthology series of three self-contained stories featuring the series' main characters.	No
Smallville	Smallville	11 issues	Ongoing series	May 2003 – January 2005	Mark Verheiden, Clint Carpenter, Drew Greenberg, Dan Thomsen	DC Comics		
The Smurfs (1981)	The Smurfs	3 issues	Ongoing series	December 1982 – February 1983	Peyo	Marvel Comics		No
Sonic X	Sonic X	40 issues	Ongoing series	November 2005 – February 2009	Joe Edkin, Tim Smith, Ron Zalme, Tracy Yardley, Steven Butler, McDonough, Patyk, Wahnish, Amash, Mike Bullock, Patrick Spaziante, Ian Flynn, David Hutchison, James Fry III, Terry Austin, Al Milgrom	Archie Comics		
Sons of Anarchy	Sons of Anarchy	25 issues	Ongoing series	September 2013 – September 2015		Boom! Studios		
Sons of Anarchy	Sons of Anarchy: Redwood Original	12 issues	Limited series	August 2016 – July 2017		Boom! Studios		
Space: 1999	Space: 1999	7 issues	Ongoing series	November 1975 – November 1976	Nicola Cuti, John Byrne, Mike Pellowski	Charlton Comics	Bimonthly publication.	No
Space: Above and Beyond	Space: Above and Beyond	3 issues	Limited series	January – March 1996	Roy Thomas	Topps Comics		No
Space: Above and Beyond	Space: Above and Beyond — The Gauntlet	2 issues	Limited series	May – June 1996	Roy Thomas	Topps Comics		No
Space Battleship Yamato	Space Battleship Yamato		Serialized manga	November 1974 – May 1975	Leiji Matsumoto	Akita Shoten	Serialized in Bōken Ō.	Collected in 1 tankōbon volume.
Space Battleship Yamato	Farewell to Space Battleship Yamato		Serialized manga	July 1978 – December 1979	Leiji Matsumoto	Akita Shoten	Serialized in Bōken Ō.	Collected in 2 tankōbon volumes.
Space Battleship Yamato	Great Yamato		Serialized manga	February 2000 – October 2001	Leiji Matsumoto	Shogakukan	Serialized in Gotta Comics.	Collected in 2 tankōbon volumes.
Space Cats	NBC Saturday Morning Comics #1: "Diamonds are Fur-ever"	1 issue	Comic story	September 1991		Harvey Comics	Adaptation of the series' sixth overall episode.	No
Space Dandy	?	Serialised manga	December 20, 2013 – October 3, 2014	Masafumi Harada (writer) Park Sung-woo (illustrator), Red Ice (illustrator)	Masafumi Harada (writer) Park Sung-woo (illustrator), Red Ice (illustrator)	Square Enix (Japan), Yen Press (United Statez)	Collected in 2 tankōbon volumes. Serialized in Young Gangan.	
Space Ghost	Space Ghost (1966)	1 issue	One-shot	December 1966		Gold Key Comics	The comic features two Space Ghost stories, "Zorak's Revenge" and "The Space Outcast". The middle story featured, "The Raiders of Ra" is based on Dino Boy in the Lost Valley.	No
Space Ghost	Hanna-Barbera Super TV Heroes #3, 6, 7	3 issues	Comic story	October 1968, July 1969, September 1969		Gold Key Comics	Three self-contained stories published in three select issues apart, the following stories in order: "The Plague of Giants" (#3), "The Sun Master" (#6) and "The Mutant Planet" (#7).	No
Space Ghost	TV Stars #3: "Pilgreen's Progress"	1 issue	Comic story	December 1978	Mark Evanier	Marvel Comics	Back-up story; five pages total.	No
Space Ghost	Space Ghost (1987)	1 issue	One-shot	December 1987	Mark Evanier, Steve Rude, Darrell McNeil (plot assistance)	Comico	The main feature story "The Sinister Spectre", followed by an article on the development of the series by Evanier.	No
Space Ghost	Cartoon Network Presents: Space Ghost	1 issue	One-shot	March 1997	Bill Matheny	Archie Comics	The comic features two stories: "The Final Defeat of Space Ghost" and "Trapped by the Time-Bot!", the latter is a crossover with Dino Boy.	No
Space Ghost	Cartoon Network Starring #4: "The Webbed Trap!"	1 issue	One-shot	December 1999	Andy Merrill	DC Comics		No
Space Ghost	Space Ghost (2005)	6 issues	Limited series	January – June 2005	Joe Kelly	DC Comics		
Space Ghost	Green Lantern/Space Ghost Special #1	1 issue	One-shot	May 2017	James Tynion IV	DC Comics	Crossover with DC's Green Lantern; part of the DC Meets Hanna-Barbera comic book line.	
Space Ghost Coast to Coast	Cartoon Network Presents #2	1 issue	Main feature (part of an ongoing series)	September 1997	Matt Wayne	DC Comics	The main feature story "Rainy Day Fun", runs for a total of fourteen pages; Space Ghost himself, along with Zorak, was featured in the cover of this issue, drawn and inked by George Pratt and colored by Kevin Somers.	No
Space Ghost Coast to Coast	Cartoon Network Starring #4, 12, 15, 18	4 issues	Main feature (part of an ongoing series)	December 1999, May 2000, August 2000, February 2001	Andy Merrill (#4, #12), Robbie Bush (#15), John Rozum (#15, #18) and Clay Martin Croker (#18)	DC Comics	Four self-contained stories published in four select issues apart, the following stories in order: "45 Minutes 'til Showtime!" (#4), "Wotta Felon!" (#12), "Just Desserts" (#15), "Bands on the Run" (#15), "Who Voo-Dooed It?" (#18), and "Lokar, Lothario" (#18).	No
Space Ghost Coast to Coast	Cartoon Cartoons #3, 6, 10, 13, 15	5 issues	Main feature, back-up feature (part of an ongoing series)	May 2001, September 2001, May 2002, November 2002, March 2003	Robbie Busch (#3, 6, 10, 15), Andy Merrill (#6), Sean Carolan (#13), Jennifer Moore (#13), Will Pfeifer (#13, 15)	DC Comics	Eight stories spanned in five issues apart with two stories featured in issues #6, 13 and #15; the following stories in order: "The Big Winner" (#3), "Go, Space Ghost Manga, Go!!!" and "Tour de Force" (both #6), "Spring Broke" (#10), "Luck of the Oafish!" and "Brak Talk" (both #13), "And Now, a Word from Our Sponsor!" and "Spacey at the Bat" (both #15).	
Speed Buggy	Hanna-Barbera Fun-In #12, 15	2 issues	Main feature (part of an ongoing series)	June 1974, December 1974	Mike Royer (#12)	Gold Key Comics	Speed Buggy appeared in three main feature strips in two issues apart: #14 had only one self-contained story "The Ice Peril!" (25 pages total), while #15 featured two stories: "Land of the Giant Plants" (13 pages) and "Sinister Safari" (12 pages).	
Speed Buggy	Speed Buggy	9 issues	Ongoing series	May 1975 – November 1976	Mike Pellowski	Charlton Comics		No
Speed Buggy	The Flash/Speed Buggy Special #1	1 issue	One-shot	July 2018	Scott Lobdell	DC Comics	Crossover with DC's The Flash; part of the DC Meets Hanna-Barbera comic book line.	
Speed Racer	Speed Racer (volume 1)	38 issues	Ongoing series	August 1987 – November 1990	Len Strazewski, Brian Thomas, Lamar Waldron, Fred Schiller, Steve Sullivan, Nat Gertler, Diane M. Piron	NOW Comics		
Spider-Man (1994)	Spider-Man Adventures	15 issues	Ongoing series	December 1994 – February 1996	Nelson Yomtov	Marvel Comics		
Spider-Man (1994)	The Adventures of Spider-Man	12 issues	Ongoing series	April 1996 – March 1997	Nelson Yomtov, Michael Higgins, Glenn Greenberg	Marvel Comics	Continuation of Adventures.	
Spider-Man and His Amazing Friends	Spider-Man and His Amazing Friends	1 issue	One-shot	December 1981	Tom DeFalco	Marvel Comics	Adaptation of the pilot episode "The Triumph of the Green Goblin"; reprinted as Marvel Action Universe #1 (January 1989).	No
Spider-Man Unlimited	Spider-Man Unlimited	5 issues	Ongoing series	December 1999 – April 2000	Eric Stephenson	Marvel Comics	Tie-in to the eponymous TV series, unrelated to the comic book which launched in 1993 and shares its title.	No
Spiral Zone	Spiral Zone	4 issues	Ongoing series	February – May 1988	Michael Fleisher	DC Comics	No	
SpongeBob SquarePants	Main article: SpongeBob Comics							
The Spooktacular New Adventures of Casper	Casper	2 issues	Ongoing series	March – May 1997	Angelo DeCesare	Marvel Comics		No
Star Blazers	Star Blazers (1983)	5 volumes	Photo comics, ongoing series	1983		West Cape Comics	Published as W.C.C. Animation Comics Volumes 1–5.	No
Star Blazers	Star Blazers (series 1)	4 issues	Limited series	April – July 1987	Phil Foglio, Doug Rice	Comico		No
Star Blazers	Star Blazers (series 2)	5 issues	Limited series	May – September 1989		Comico		No
Star Blazers	Star Blazers (1997)	12 issues	Ongoing series	March 1995 – May 1997		Argo Press		No
Star Trek: Deep Space Nine	Star Trek: Deep Space Nine (series 1)	32 issues	Ongoing series	August 1993 – January 1996	Mike W. Barr, Len Strazewski, Mark A. Altman, Dan Mishkin, Charles Marshall, Jerry Bingham, John Vornholt, Laurie S. Sutton, Chris Dows, Colin Clayton, Randy Lofficier, Jean-Marc Lofficier, Mark Paniccia, Leonard Kirk,	Malibu Comics		
Star Trek: Deep Space Nine	Star Trek: Deep Space Nine – Hearts and Minds	4 issues	Limited series	June – September 1994	Mark A. Altman	Malibu Comics		
Star Trek: Deep Space Nine	Star Trek: Deep Space Nine/The Next Generation	2 issues	Limited series	October – November 1994	Mike W. Barr	Malibu Comics	Parts two and three of an intercompany crossover with DC Comics.	
Star Trek: Deep Space Nine	Star Trek: Deep Space Nine – Lightstorm	1 issue	One-shot	December 1994	Mark A. Altman	Malibu Comics	The main feature story, followed by an interview with Michael Westmore.	
Star Trek: Deep Space Nine	Star Trek: Deep Space Nine – Terok Nor	1 issue	One-shot	January 1995	Mark A. Altman	Malibu Comics		
Star Trek: Deep Space Nine	Star Trek: Deep Space Nine Annual	1 issue	One-shot	January 1995	Mike W. Barr	Malibu Comics	The main feature story "The Looking Glass War"; 64 pages total.	
Star Trek: Deep Space Nine	Star Trek: Deep Space Nine – The Maquis	3 issues	Limited series	February – April 1995	Mark A. Altman	Malibu Comics		
Star Trek: Deep Space Nine	Star Trek: Deep Space Nine – Celebrity Series: Blood and Honor	1 issue	One-shot	May 1995	Mark Lenard	Malibu Comics		
Star Trek: Deep Space Nine	Star Trek: Deep Space Nine – Celebrity Series: Rules of Diplomacy	1 issue	One-shot	August 1995	Aron Eisenberg	Malibu Comics		
Star Trek: Deep Space Nine	Star Trek: Deep Space Nine Special	1 issue	One-shot	August 1995		Malibu Comics	Anthology of five self-contained stories featuring the series' main characters; 48 pages total.	
Star Trek: Deep Space Nine	Star Trek: Deep Space Nine Ultimate Special	1 issue	One-shot	December 1995	Laurie Sutton	Malibu Comics	The main feature story, followed by two back-up stories; 64 pages total.	
Star Trek: Deep Space Nine	Star Trek: Deep Space Nine Worf Special	1 issue	One-shot	December 1995	Dan Mishkin	Malibu Comics	The main feature story, followed by a biography of Worf; 48 pages total.	
Star Trek: Deep Space Nine	Star Trek: Deep Space Nine (series 2)	15 issues	Ongoing series	November 1996 – March 1998	Howard Weinstein, Mariano, Mariano Nicieza, Michael Martin, Andy Mangels	Marvel Comics	Published by Marvel under the imprint Paramount Comics.	
Star Trek: Deep Space Nine	Star Trek: Deep Space Nine – N-Vector	4 issues	Limited series	August – November 2000	K. W. Jeter	WildStorm		
Star Trek: Deep Space Nine	Star Trek: Divided We Fall	4 issues	Limited series	July – October 2001	John Ordover, David Mack	WildStorm	The Next Generation/Deep Space Nine crossover story.	
Star Trek: Deep Space Nine	Star Trek: Deep Space Nine – Fool's Gold	4 issues	Limited series	December 2009 – March 2010	Scott Tipton, David Tipton	IDW Publishing		
Star Trek: Deep Space Nine	Star Trek: Deep Space Nine – Too Long a Sacrifice	4 issues	Limited series	April – October 2020	Scott Tipton, David Tipton	IDW Publishing		
Star Trek: Deep Space Nine	Star Trek: Deep Space Nine – The Dog of War	4 issues	Limited series	April – August 2023	Mike Chen	IDW Publishing		
Star Trek: Discovery	Star Trek: Discovery – The Light of Kahless	4 issues	Limited series	October 2017 – January 2018	Mike Johnson, Kirsten Beyer	IDW Publishing		
Star Trek: Discovery	Star Trek: Discovery Annual	1 issue	One-shot	February 2018	Mike Johnson, Kirsten Beyer	IDW Publishing	Annual publication.	
Star Trek: Discovery	Star Trek: Discovery – Succession	4 issues	Limited series	April – July 2018	Mike Johnson, Kirsten Beyer	IDW Publishing		
Star Trek: Discovery	Star Trek: Discovery – Captain Saru	1 issue	One-shot	February 2019	Mike Johnson, Kirsten Beyer	IDW Publishing		
Star Trek: Discovery	Star Trek: Discovery – Aftermath	3 issues	Limited series	August – October 2019	Mike Johnson, Kirsten Beyer	IDW Publishing		
Star Trek: Discovery	Star Trek: Discovery – Adventures in the 32nd Century	4 issues	Limited series	March – June 2022	Mike Johnson, Kirsten Beyer	IDW Publishing		
Star Trek: Lower Decks	Star Trek: Lower Decks	3 issues	Limited series	September – November 2022	Ryan North	IDW Publishing		
Star Trek: Picard	Star Trek: Picard – Countdown	3 issues	Limited series	November 2019 – January 2020	Mike Johnson, Kirsten Beyer	IDW Publishing		
Star Trek: Picard	Star Trek: Picard – Stargazer	3 issues	Limited series	August – November 2022	Mike Johnson	IDW Publishing		
Star Trek: Strange New Worlds	Star Trek: Strange New Worlds – The Illyrian Enigma	4 issues	Limited series	December 2022 – March 2023	Kirsten Beyer, Mike Johnson	IDW Publishing		
Star Trek: Strange New Worlds	Star Trek: Strange New Worlds – The Scorpius Run	3 issues	Limited series	August 2023 – 2024	Mike Johnson, Ryan Parrott	IDW Publishing		
Star Trek: The Animated Series	Star Trek vs. Transformers	8 issues	Limited series	September 2018 – January 2019	John Barber, Mike Johnson	IDW Publishing	Crossover with Hasbro's Transformers.	
Star Trek: The Next Generation (list)	Star Trek: The Next Generation (series 1)	6 issues	Limited series	February – July 1988	Mike Carlin	DC Comics		
Star Trek: The Next Generation (list)	Star Trek: The Next Generation (series 2)	80 issues	Ongoing series	October 1989 – February 1996	Michael Jan Friedman (#1–17, #19–28, #30–50, #52–80), David Stern (#18), Mike O'Brien (#18), Kevin Ryan (#29, #45, #46), Judith Reeves-Stevens (#51), Garfield Reeves-Stevens (#51)	DC Comics		
Star Trek: The Next Generation (list)	Star Trek: The Next Generation Annual	6 issues	One-shot	1990 – 1995	John de Lancie (#1), Michael Jan Friedman (#2, #3, #6), Mike W. Barr (#4), Howard Weinstein (#5, #6)	DC Comics	All six issues are annual publications.	
Star Trek: The Next Generation (list)	Star Trek: The Next Generation – The Modala Imperative	4 issues	Limited series	August – November 1991	Peter David	DC Comics	Crossover storyline continued from the Original Series limited series that shared the same title.	
Star Trek: The Next Generation (list)	Star Trek: The Next Generation Special	3 issues	One-shot	1993 – 1995	Tony Isabella (#1), Anne Wokanovicz (#1), Ken Penders (#1), Diane Duane (#1), Chris Claremont (#2), Michael Jan Friedman (#2) Michael Demerit (#3), Kevin J. Ryan (#3)	DC Comics		
Star Trek: The Next Generation (list)	Star Trek: The Next Generation – The Series Finale	1 issue	One-shot	1994	Michael Jan Friedman	DC Comics	Adaptation of the episode "All Good Things..." (season 7, episodes 25–26); 64 pages total.	
Star Trek: The Next Generation (list)	Star Trek: The Next Generation/Deep Space Nine	2 issues	Limited series	December 1994	Michael Jan Friedman	DC Comics	Parts one and four of an intercompany crossover with Malibu Comics.	
Star Trek: The Next Generation (list)	Star Trek: The Next Generation – Shadowheart	4 issues	Limited series	December 1994 – March 1995	Michael Jan Friedman	DC Comics		
Star Trek: The Next Generation (list)	Star Trek: The Next Generation – Ill Wind	4 issues	Limited series	November 1995 – February 1996	Diane Duane	DC Comics		
Star Trek: The Next Generation (list)	Star Trek Unlimited	10 issues	Ongoing series	November 1996 – July 1998	Dan Abnett, Ian Edginton	Marvel Comics	Anthology series alternating stories with The Original Series.	
Star Trek: The Next Generation (list)	Star Trek: The Next Generation/X-Men: Second Contact	1 issue	One-shot	May 1998	Dan Abnett, Ian Edginton	Marvel Comics	Published by Marvel under the imprint Paramount Comics; crossover with Marvel's X-Men. Storyline continued in the novel Planet X (1998), written by Michael Jan Friedman and published by Pocket Books in April the same year.	No
Star Trek: The Next Generation (list)	Star Trek: The Next Generation Special – Riker: The Enemy of My Enemy	1 issue	One-shot	July 1998	Dan Abnett, Ian Edginton	Marvel Comics	Published by Marvel under the imprint Paramount Comics.	No
Star Trek: The Next Generation (list)	Star Trek: The Next Generation – Perchance to Dream	4 issues	Limited series	February – May 2000	Keith R. A. DeCandido	WildStorm		
Star Trek: The Next Generation (list)	Star Trek: The Next Generation – Embrace the Wolf	1 issue	One-shot	June 2000	Christopher Golden, Tom Sniegoski	WildStorm		
Star Trek: The Next Generation (list)	Star Trek: The Next Generation – The Gorn Crisis	1 volume	Graphic novel	January 2001	Kevin J. Anderson, Rebecca Moesta	WildStorm		
Star Trek: The Next Generation (list)	Star Trek: The Next Generation – The Killing Shadows	4 issues	Limited series	November 2000 – February 2001	Scott Ciencin	WildStorm		
Star Trek: The Next Generation (list)	Star Trek: Divided We Fall	4 issues	Limited series	July – October 2001	John Ordover, David Mack	WildStorm	The Next Generation/Deep Space Nine crossover story.	
Star Trek: The Next Generation (list)	Star Trek: The Next Generation – Forgiveness	1 volume	Graphic novel	October 2002	David Brin	WildStorm		
Star Trek: The Next Generation (list)	Star Trek: The Next Generation – The Space Between	6 issues	Limited series	January – June 2007	David Tischman	IDW Publishing		
Star Trek: The Next Generation (list)	Star Trek: The Next Generation – Intelligence Gathering	5 issues	Limited series	January – May 2008	Scott Tipton, David Tipton	IDW Publishing		
Star Trek: The Next Generation (list)	Star Trek: The Next Generation: The Manga – Boukenshin	1 volume	OEL manga	April 2009	Christine Boylan, David Gerrold, Diane Duane, F.J. DeSanto	Tokyopop		
Star Trek: The Next Generation (list)	Star Trek: The Next Generation – The Last Generation	5 issues	Limited series	November 2008 – March 2009	Andrew Steven Harris	IDW Publishing		
Star Trek: The Next Generation (list)	Star Trek: The Next Generation – Ghosts	5 issues	Limited series	November 2009 – March 2010	Zander Cannon	IDW Publishing		
Star Trek: The Next Generation (list)	Star Trek: The Next Generation/Doctor Who: Assimilation²	8 issues	Limited series	May – December 2012	Scott Tipton, David Tipton	IDW Publishing	Crossover with Doctor Who.	
Star Trek: The Next Generation (list)	Star Trek: The Next Generation – Hive	4 issues	Limited series	September 2012 – February 2013	Brannon Braga	IDW Publishing		
Star Trek: The Next Generation (list)	Star Trek: The Next Generation – Mirror Broken	5 issues	Limited series	May – October 2017	Scott Tipton, David Tipton	IDW Publishing	Supplemented by a prelude Free Comic Book Day issue (May 2017) and a one-shot issue Origin of Data (September 2017).	
Star Trek: The Next Generation (list)	Star Trek: The Next Generation – Through the Mirror	5 issues	Limited series	May 2018	Scott Tipton, David Tipton	IDW Publishing		
Star Trek: The Next Generation (list)	Star Trek: The Next Generation – Terra Incognita	6 issues	Limited series	July – December 2018	Scott Tipton, David Tipton	IDW Publishing		
Star Trek: The Next Generation (list)	Star Trek: The Next Generation – IDW 20/20	1 issue	One-shot	January 2019	Peter David	IDW Publishing	Part of the IDW 20/20 comic line.	
Star Trek: The Next Generation (list)	Star Trek: The Mirror War	8 issues	Limited series	October 2021 – August 2022	Scott Tipton, David Tipton	IDW Publishing	Supplemented by issue #0 (August 2021) and four one-shot tie-ins: Data (December 2021), Georgi (March 2022), Sisko (June 2022) and Troi (September 2022).	
Star Trek: The Original Series	Star Trek (1967)	61 issues	Ongoing series	1967 – 1979		Gold Key Comics		
Star Trek: The Original Series	TV21 #1–105	105 issues	Ongoing series, serial	September 27, 1969 – September 25, 1971		City Magazines (1965–1971); IPC Magazines (1971)		
Star Trek: The Original Series	Star Trek (1979)		Newspaper strip	December 2, 1979 – December 3, 1983		Los Angeles Times Syndicate		
Star Trek: The Original Series	Star Trek (1980)	18 issues	Ongoing series	1980 – 1982		Marvel Comics	The first three issues were an adaptation of the first feature film.	
Star Trek: The Original Series	Star Trek (DC) (volume 1)	56 issues	Ongoing series	February 1984 – November 1988		DC Comics		
Star Trek: The Original Series	Star Trek Annual (DC) (volume 1)	3 issues	Limited series	1985 – 1988	Mike W. Barr (#1–2), Peter David (#3)	DC Comics		
Star Trek: The Original Series	Who's Who in Star Trek	2 issues	Limited series	March – April 1987	Allan Asherman	DC Comics		
Star Trek: The Original Series	Star Trek (DC) (volume 2)	80 issues	Ongoing series	October 1989 – February 1996		DC Comics		
Star Trek: The Original Series	Star Trek Annual (DC) (volume 2)	6 issues	Limited series	1990 – 1995	Peter David (#1, #2), George Takei (#1), Howard Weinstein (#3, #6), Michael Jan Friedman (#4, #5, #6)	DC Comics		
Star Trek: The Original Series	Star Trek: The Modala Imperative	4 issues	Limited series	July – September 1991	Michael Jan Friedman	DC Comics	Crossover storyline continued in the Next Generation limited series that shared the same title.	
Star Trek: The Original Series	Star Trek: Debt of Honor	1 volume	Graphic novel	September 1992	Chris Claremont	DC Comics		
Star Trek: The Original Series	Star Trek Special	3 issues	One-shot	Spring 1994 – Winter 1995	Peter A. David (#1), Michael Collins (#1), Kevin J. Ryan (#2), Steven H. Wilson (#2), Michael Jan Friedman (#3), Mark A. Altman (#3)	DC Comics		
Star Trek: The Original Series	Star Trek: The Ashes of Eden	1 volume	Graphic novel	May 18, 1995	William Shatner, Judith Reeves-Stevens, Garfield Reeves-Stevens	DC Comics	Adaptation of the eponymous novel; set in the "Shatnerverse" continuity.	
Star Trek: The Original Series	Star Trek Unlimited	10 issues	Ongoing series	November 1996 – July 1998	Dan Abnett, Ian Edginton	Marvel Comics	Anthology series alternating stories with The Next Generation.	
Star Trek: The Original Series	Star Trek/X-Men	1 issue	One-shot	December 1996	Scott Lobdell	Marvel Comics	Main feature story titled "Star TreX"; published by Marvel under the imprint Paramount Comics; crossover with Marvel's X-Men.	No
Star Trek: The Original Series	Star Trek: Mirror Mirror	1 issue	One-shot	February 1997	Tom DeFalco	Marvel Comics	Published by Marvel under the imprint Paramount Comics; continuation of the episode "Mirror, Mirror" (season 2, episode 4).	No
Star Trek: The Original Series	Star Trek: Early Voyages	17 issues	Ongoing series	February 1997 – June 1998	Dan Abnett, Ian Edginton	Marvel Comics	Published by Marvel under the imprint Paramount Comics; continuation of the pilot episode "The Cage".	
Star Trek: The Original Series	Star Trek: Untold Voyages	5 issues	Limited series	March – July 1998	Glenn Greenberg	Marvel Comics	Published by Marvel under the imprint Paramount Comics; set between the films Star Trek: The Motion Picture (1979) and Star Trek II: The Wrath of Khan (1982).	
Star Trek: The Original Series	Star Trek: All of Me	1 issue	One-shot	2000	Tony Isabella, Bob Ingersoll	WildStorm		
Star Trek: The Original Series	Star Trek: Enter the Wolves	1 issue	One-shot	2001	Ann C. Crispin, Howard Weinstein	WildStorm		
Star Trek: The Original Series	Star Trek: The Manga	3 volumes	OEL manga	September 5, 2006 – July 15, 2008	Mike W. Barr, Dr. Christopher Dows, Jim Alexander, Joshua Ortega, Rob Tokar, Mike Wellman, Paul Benjamin Mike Wellman, Paul Benjamin, Christine Boylan, Diane Duane, Wil Wheaton, David Gerrold	Tokyopop		
Star Trek: The Original Series	Star Trek: Klingons – Blood Will Tell	5 issues	Limited series	April – August 2007	Scott Tipton, David Tipton	IDW Publishing		
Star Trek: The Original Series	Focus On Star Trek	1 issue	One-shot	July 2007	David Tischman	IDW Publishing	24 page special.	
Star Trek: The Original Series	Star Trek: Year Four	6 issues	Limited series	July – December 2007	David Tischman	IDW Publishing		
Star Trek: The Original Series	Star Trek: Year Four – The Enterprise Experiment	5 issues	Limited series	April – August 2008	D.C. Fontana, Derek Chester	IDW Publishing	Sequel to Year Four.	
Star Trek: The Original Series	Star Trek: Assignment: Earth	5 issues	Limited series	May – August 2008	John Byrne	IDW Publishing	Continuation of the episode "Assignment: Earth" (season 2, episode 26).	
Star Trek: The Original Series	Star Trek: Crew	5 issues	Limited series	March – July 2009	John Byrne	IDW Publishing	Prequel to the pilot episode "The Cage".	
Star Trek: The Original Series	Star Trek: Mission's End	5 issues	Limited series	March – July 2009	Ty Templeton	IDW Publishing		
Star Trek: The Original Series	Star Trek: Captain's Log: Sulu	1 issue	One-shot	January 2010	Scott Tipton, David Tipton	IDW Publishing		
Star Trek: The Original Series	Star Trek: Leonard McCoy, Frontier Doctor	5 issues	Limited series	April – July 2010	John Byrne	IDW Publishing		
Star Trek: The Original Series	Star Trek: Burden of Knowledge	4 issues	Limited series	June – September 2010	Scott Tipton, David Tipton	IDW Publishing		
Star Trek: The Original Series	Star Trek: Captain's Log: Pike	1 issue	One-shot	September 2010	Stuart Moore	IDW Publishing		
Star Trek: The Original Series	Star Trek: Khan – Ruling in Hell	5 issues	Limited series	October 2010 – January 2011	Scott Tipton, David Tipton	IDW Publishing	Set in the fifteen years between the episode "Space Seed" (season 1, episode 22) and Star Trek II: The Wrath of Khan (1982).	
Star Trek: The Original Series	Star Trek: Infestation	2 issues	Limited series	February 2011	John Byrne	IDW Publishing	Part of the eponymous crossover event series Infestation.	
Star Trek: The Original Series	Star Trek/Legion of Super-Heroes	6 issues	Limited series	October 2011 – March 2012	Chris Roberson	DC Comics, IDW Publishing	Crossover with DC's Legion of Super-Heroes.	
Star Trek: The Original Series	Star Trek: Harlan Ellison's The City on the Edge of Forever – The Original Teleplay	5 issues	Limited series	June – October 2014	Harlan Ellison, Scott Tipton, David Tipton	IDW Publishing	Adaptation of Harlan Ellison's original teleplay of the eponymous episode (season 1, episode 28).	
Star Trek: The Original Series	Star Trek/Planet of the Apes: The Primate Directive	5 issues	Limited series	December 2014 – April 2015	Scott Tipton, David Tipton	IDW Publishing, Boom! Studios	Crossover with Planet of the Apes.	
Star Trek: The Original Series	Star Trek/Green Lantern: The Spectrum War	6 issues	Limited series	July – December 2015	Mike Johnson	DC Comics, IDW Publishing	First crossover with DC's Green Lantern.	
Star Trek: The Original Series	Star Trek/Green Lantern: Stranger Worlds	6	Limited series	December 2016 – May 2017	Mike Johnson	DC Comics, IDW Publishing	Second crossover with DC's Green Lantern.	
Star Trek: The Original Series	Star Trek: Year Five	26 issues	Ongoing series	February 2020 – June 2021	Paul Cornell (#0,#25), Jackson Lanzing (#1–2, #7–9, #11–14, #17, #22–25), Collin Kelly (#1–2, #7–9, #11–14, #17,#22–25), Brandon M. Easton (#3, #20–21, #25), Jody Houser (#5–6, #15–16, #25), Jim McCann (#9–10, #18, #25)	IDW Publishing	25 regular issues and an issue #0.	
Star Trek: The Original Series	Star Trek: Hell's Mirror	1 issue	One-shot	August 2020	J.M. DeMatteis	IDW Publishing		
Star Trek: Voyager	Star Trek: Voyager	15 issues	Ongoing series	November 1996 – March 1998	Laurie S. Sutton (#1–3, #10–15) Howard Weinstein (#4–5), Ben Raab (#6–8), Dan Abnett (#9), Ian Edginton (#9), Gwen L. Sutton (#14–15)	Marvel Comics	Published by Marvel under the imprint Paramount Comics.	
Star Trek: Voyager	Star Trek: Voyager – Splashdown	4 issues	Limited series	April–July 1998	Laurie S. Sutton	Marvel Comics	Published by Marvel under the imprint Paramount Comics.	
Star Trek: Voyager	Star Trek: Voyager – False Colors	1 issue	One-shot	January 2000	Nathan Archer	WildStorm		
Star Trek: Voyager	Star Trek: Voyager – Elite Force	1 issue	One-shot	July 2000	Dan Abnett, Andy Lanning	WildStorm	Prelude to the 2000 first-person shooter video game developed by Raven Software and published by Activision.	
Star Trek: Voyager	Star Trek: Voyager – Avalon Rising	1 issue	One-shot	September 2000	Janine Ellen Young, Doselle Young	WildStorm		
Star Trek: Voyager	Star Trek: Voyager – Planet Killer	3 issues	Limited series	March – May 2001	Kristine Kathryn Rusch, Dean Wesley Smith	WildStorm		
Star Trek: Voyager	Star Trek: Voyager – Mirrors & Smoke	1 issue	One-shot	October 2019	Paul Allor	IDW Publishing		
Star Trek: Voyager	Star Trek: Voyager – Seven's Reckoning	4 issues	Limited series	November 2020 – February 2021	Dave Baker	IDW Publishing		
Star Trek: Voyager	Star Trek: Voyager – Homecoming	5 issues	Limited series	September 2025 – February 2026	Tilly Bridges, Susan Bridges	IDW Publishing	Set after "Endgame" (season 7, episodes 25–26).	
Star vs. the Forces of Evil	Star vs. the Forces of Evil: Deep Trouble	4 issues	Limited series	September 2016 – January 2017	Zach Marcus	Joe Books Ltd		Star vs. the Forces of Evil: Deep Trouble TPB
Star Wars Legends	Star Wars: Ewoks	14 issues	Ongoing series	May 1985 – July 1987	David Manak	Marvel Comics/Star Comics		Star Wars Omnibus: Droids and Ewoks TP: 1595829539/9781595829535; Star Wars Legends: Droids & Ewoks HC: 1302900854/9781302900854
Star Wars Legends	Star Wars: Droids	8 issues	Ongoing series	April 1986 – June 1987	Dave Manak, George Carragone	Marvel Comics/Star Comics	The last three issues are a three-part alternate telling of Star Wars (1977) from the viewpoint of R2-D2 and C-3PO.	Star Wars Omnibus: Droids and Ewoks TP: 1595829539/9781595829535; Star Wars Legends: Droids & Ewoks HC: 1302900854/9781302900854
Star Wars Legends	Star Wars: Clone Wars – Adventures	10 volumes	Graphic novels	July 2003 – December 2007		Dark Horse Comics		
Star Wars: The Clone Wars	Star Wars: The Clone Wars	10 issues	Ongoing series	September 2008 – January 2010	Henry Gilroy, Steven Melching	Dark Horse Comics		
Star Wars: The Clone Wars	Star Wars Adventures: The Clone Wars – Battle Tales	6 issues	Limited series	April – September 2020	Michael Moreci	IDW Publishing	Part of Star Wars Adventures line.	
Stargate Atlantis	Stargate Atlantis: Wraithfall	3 issues	Limited series	July 2006 – February 2007	Stuart Moore, Mauricio Melo	Avatar Press		
Stargate SG-1	Stargate SG-1: POW	3 issues	Limited series	February – April 2004	James Anthony, Renato Guedes	Avatar Press		
Stargate SG-1	Stargate SG-1: Aris Boch	1 issue	One-shot	November 2004	James Anthony	Avatar Press		
Stargate SG-1	Stargate: Vala Mal Doran	5 issues	Limited series	May – November 2010	Brandon Jerwa	Dynamite Entertainment		
Stargate SG-1	Stargate: Daniel Jackson	4 issues	Limited series	July – November 2010	Doug Murray	Dynamite Entertainment		
Stargate Universe	Stargate Universe: Back to Destiny	6 issues	Limited series	June 2017 – September 2018	Mark L. Haynes, J.C. Vaughn	American Mythology Productions		
Steve Donovan, Western Marshal	Four Color (series 2) #675, #768, #880	3 issues	Ongoing series	1956, 1957, 1958		Dell Comics	Tryout issues for a possible ongoing series that went unpublished.	No
Steven Universe	Steven Universe (series 1)	8 issues	Limited series	August 2014 – March 2015	Jeremy Sorese	Boom! Studios		
Steven Universe	Steven Universe: Greg Universe Special	1 issue	One-shot	April 2015	Jeremy Sorese, Liz Prince, Rachel Dukes, Chrystin Garland, Grace Kraft, Kelly Turnbull, Coleman Engle, Kevin Panetta, Jared Morgan	Boom! Studios		
Steven Universe	Steven Universe: Too Cool for School	1 volume	Graphic novel	April 2016	Ian Jones, Jeremy Sorese	Boom! Studios		
Steven Universe	Steven Universe: 2016 Special	1 issue	One-shot	December 2016	Ayme Sotuyo, Sara Talmadge, Queenie Chan, Katie Jones, Rii Abrego, T. Zysk, Nichole Andelfinger, Cara McGee	Boom! Studios		
Steven Universe	Steven Universe and the Crystal Gems	4 issues	Limited series	March – June 2016	Josceline Fenton	Boom! Studios		
Steven Universe	Steven Universe (series 2)	36 issues	Ongoing series	February 2017 – January 2020	Melanie Gillman, Grace Kraft, Terry Blas, Sarah Graley, Taylor Robin	Boom! Studios		
Steven Universe	Steven Universe: Anti-Gravity	1 volume	Graphic novel	November 2017	Ian Jones, Jeremy Sorese	Boom! Studios		
Steven Universe	Steven Universe: Harmony	5 issues	Limited series	August – December 2018	Shane-Michael Vidaurri	Boom! Studios		
Steven Universe	Steven Universe: Ultimate Dough-Down	1 volume	Graphic novel	December 2018	Talya Perper	Boom! Studios		
Steven Universe	Steven Universe: Camp Pining Play	1 volume	Graphic novel	April 2019	Nicole Mannino	Boom! Studios		
Steven Universe	Steven Universe: Fusion Frenzy	1 issue	One-shot	March 2019	Anthony Oliveira, Yu Yang, Steve Foxe, Nicole Andelfinger and Sarah Gailey. Art by Ver, Doki Rosi, Xiao Tong Kong, Mollie Rose, Maurizia Rubino	Boom! Studios		
Steven Universe	Steven Universe: Crystal Clean	1 volume	Graphic novel	June 2020	Talya Perper	Boom! Studios		
Stingray	TV Century 21 #1–189	189 issues	Comic story, serial	January 23, 1965 – August 30, 1968	Alan Fennell, Ron Embleton	City Magazines		
Storm Hawks						DMF Comics		
The StoryTeller	The StoryTeller	1 volume	Graphic novel	December 6, 2011	Roger Langridge, Marjorie Liu, Ron Marz, Jeff Parker, Francesco Francavilla, J.L. Meyer, Tom Fowler, Chris Eliopoulos, Colleen Coover, Janet Lee, Anthony Minghella	Archaia Entertainment		
The StoryTeller	The StoryTeller: Witches	4 issues	Limited series	September – December 2014	Shane-Michael Vidaurri, Kyla Vanderklugt, Matthew Dow Smith, Anthony Meghella	Archaia Entertainment		
The StoryTeller	The StoryTeller: Dragons	4 issues	Limited series	December 2015 – March 2016	Daniel Bayliss, Fabian Rangel, Nathan Pride, Hannah Christenson, Jorge Corona	Archaia Entertainment		
The StoryTeller	The StoryTeller: Giants	4 issues	Limited series	December 2016 – March 2017	Conor Nolan, Brandon Dayton, Jared Cullum, Feifei Ruan	Archaia Entertainment		
The StoryTeller	The StoryTeller: Fairies	4 issues	Limited series	December 2017 – March 2018	Matt Smith, Benjamin Schipper, Tyler Jenkins, Celia Lowenthal	Archaia Entertainment		
The StoryTeller	The StoryTeller: Sirens	4 issues	Limited series	April – July 2019	Sztybor Bartosz, Chan Chau, Sarah Webb, Aud Koch	Archaia Entertainment		
The StoryTeller	The StoryTeller: Ghosts	4 issues	Limited series	March – August 2020	Mark Laszlo, Jennifer Rostowsky, Michael Walsh	Archaia Entertainment		
The StoryTeller	The StoryTeller: Tricksters	4 issues	Limited series	March – June 2021	Jonathan Rivera, Jordan Ifueko, Amal El-Motar, Robin Kaplan	Archaia Entertainment		
The StoryTeller	The StoryTeller: Ghosts	4 issues	Limited series	March – June 2022	Andre R. Frattino, Darcie Little Badger, Em Niwa, Deron Bennett	Archaia Entertainment		
Stranger Things	Stranger Things	4 issues	Limited series	September 2018 – January 2019	Jody Houser	Dark Horse Comics		
Street Fighter II V	Street Fighter II V Retsuden		Serialized manga	May 1995 – May 1996	Yasushi Baba	Kodansha	Serializaed in Comic BomBom.	Collected in 3 tankōbon volumes.
Street Sharks	Street Sharks (series 1)	3 issues	Limited series	January – March 1996		Archie Comics		No
Street Sharks	Street Sharks (series 2)	3 issues	Ongoing series	May – August 1996		Archie Comics		No
Stretch Armstrong and the Flex Fighters	Stretch Armstrong and the Flex Fighters	3 issues	Limited series	January – March 2018	Kevin Burke, Chris "Doc" Wyatt	IDW Publishing		
Stunt Dawgs	Stunt Dawgs	1 issue	One-shot	March 1993	Michael Gallagher	Harvey Comics		No
Sugarfoot	Four Color (series 2) #907, 992, 1059, 1098, 1147, 1209	6 issues	One-shot	1958, May–July 1959, November 1959-January 1960, May–July 1960, November 1960-January 1961, October–December 1961		Dell Comics	Tryout issues for a possible ongoing series that went unpublished	No
Super Friends (1973)	Limited Collectors' Edition #C-41	1 issue	One-shot	December 1975-January 1976	E. Nelson Bridwell	DC Comics		No
Super Friends (1973)	The Super Friends	47 issues	Ongoing series	November 1976 – August 1981	E. Nelson Bridwell, Nick Pascale, Sergius O'Shaughnessy, Bob Rozakis, Bob Oksner, Martin Pasko	DC Comics		
Super Friends (1973)	Aquateers Meet the Super Friends	1 issue	Minicomic	1979		DC Comics		No
The Super Hero Squad Show	Marvel Super Hero Squad (series 1)	4 issues	Limited series	November 2009 – February 2010	Mark Hoffmeier, Todd Dezago, Eugene Son, Cort Lane	Marvel Comics		
The Super Hero Squad Show	Marvel Super Hero Squad (series 2)	12 issues	Ongoing series	March 2010 – February 2011	Todd Dezago	Marvel Comics		
Superboy	Superboy: The Comic Book	22 issues	Ongoing series	February 1990 – February 1982	John Moore, Dan Jurgens, Mark Waid, Tom Peyer, Jonathan Peterson, Paul Kupperberg, Joey Cavalieri, Jim Mooney, John Statema, Kevin Dooley	DC Comics	Tie-in to the eponymous TV series; retitled The Adventures of Superboy from #10.	
Supercar	TV Comic #483–667	194 issues	Comic story, serial	March 18, 1961 – September 26, 1964		Polystyle Publications		
Supercar	TV Century 21 #1–51	51 issues	Comic story, serial	January 23, 1965 – January 8, 1966		City Magazines		
Supercar	Supercar	4 issues	Limited series	November 1962 – August 1963	Paul S. Newman	Gold Key Comics		No
Supergirl	Adventures of Supergirl	6 issues	Limited series	July – September 2016	Sterling Gates	DC Comics		
Superman: The Animated Series	Superman Adventures	66 issues	Ongoing series	November 1996 – April 2002	Paul Dini, Scott McCloud, Mark Evanier, Chris Duffy, Jordan B. Gorfinkel, Evan Dorking, Sarah Dyer, Mark Millar, David Micheline, Randall Frenz, Ron Frenz, Ty Templeton, Dan Slott, Jeff Grubb, S. C. Bury, Kelley Puckett, Jay Faerer, Michael Reaves, Dean Motter, Dan Jolley, Andy Merrill	DC Comics		
Superman: The Animated Series	Batman & Superman Adventures: World's Finest	1 volume	Graphic novel	October 1997	Paul Dini	DC Comics	Adaptation of the three-part story arc "World's Finest", which aired on October 4, 1997 as episodes 16, 17 and 18 of the second season (and episodes 29, 30 and 31 overall of the series).	
Supernatural	Supernatural: Origins	6 issues	Limited series	July – December 2007	Peter Johnson	WildStorm		
Supernatural	Supernatural: Rising Son	6 issues	Limited series	June – November 2008	Peter Johnson, Rebecca Dessertine	WildStorm		
Supernatural	Supernatural: Beginning's End	6 issues	Limited series	March – August 2010	Andrew Dabb, Daniel Loflin	WildStorm		
Supernatural	Supernatural: Caledonia	6 issues	Limited series	December 2011 – May 2012	Brian Wood	DC Comics		

== T ==
Based on	Title	Length	Format	Publication date	Authors	Publisher	Notes	Collected editions
Tales from the Darkside	Tales from the Darkside	4 issues	Limited series	June 2016 – September 2016	Joe Hill, Michael Benedetto	IDW Publishing		
Tales of the 77th Bengal Lancers	Four Color (series 2) #791: "The 77th Bengal Lancers"	1 issue	One-shot	April 1957	?	Dell Comics	Main feature story adapted from the episode "The Traitor".	
Tales of the Gold Monkey	TV Comic #1656–1697	41 issues	Serial	September 16, 1983 – June 29, 1984	?	Polystyle Publications		No
Tales of the Texas Rangers	Four Color (series 2) #396	1 issue	One-shot	May 1952	?	Dell Comics		No
Tales of the Texas Rangers	Jace Pearson of the Texas Rangers #2–9	8 issues	Ongoing series	July 1953 – April 1955	Philip Evans	Dell Comics	Quarterly publication.	No
Tales of the Texas Rangers	Jace Pearson's Tales of the Texas Rangers #11–20	10 issues	Ongoing series	March–May 1956 – August 1958	?	Dell Comics		No
Tales of the Texas Rangers	Four Color (series 2) #961, #1021: "Jace Pearson's Tales of the Texas Rangers"	2 issues	One-shot	December 1958, August–October 1959	?	Dell Comics		No
Tales of the Wizard of Oz	Four Color (series 2) #1308	1 issue	One-shot	March–May 1962	?	Dell Comics		No
Tales of Wells Fargo	Four Color (series 2) #968, #1023, #1075, #1113, #1167, #1215, #1287	7 issues	One-shot	February 1959, August–October 1959, February–April 1960, July–September 1960, March–May 1961, October–December 1961, February–April 1962	?	Dell Comics		No
Tales of Wells Fargo	Man from Wells Fargo #01-495-207	1 issue	One-shot	May–July 1962	Gaylord DuBois	Dell Comics		No
TaleSpin	TaleSpin	7 issues	Ongoing series	June 1991 – December 1991	Bobbi JG Weiss, L. Hinson	Disney Comics		
Tangled: The Series	Tangled: The Series	4 issues	Limited series	January 2018 – March 2018	Scott Peterson, Liz Marsham, Alessandro Ferrari	IDW Publishing		
Tangled: The Series	Tangled: The Series – Hair-Raising Adventures	3 issues	Limited series	September 2018 – November 2018	Katie Cook	IDW Publishing		
Tangled: The Series	Tangled: The Series – Hair and Now	3 issues	March 2019 – May 2019	Limited series	Katie Cook	IDW Publishing		
Tangled: The Series	Tangled: The Series – Hair It Is	1 issue	One-shot	August 2019	Leigh Dragoon, Katie Cook	IDW Publishing		
Target: The Corruptors!	Four Color (series 2) #1306	3 issues	One-shot		Dell Comics	March–May 1962	Tryout issue for the eventual series.	No
Target: The Corruptors!	Target: The Corruptors! #2–3	3 issues	Ongoing series	June–August 1962 – October–December 1962	Dell Comics	?	The main series overall, continued from Four Color #1306.	No
Teen Titans	Teen Titans Go! (2004)	55 issues	Ongoing series	January 2004 – July 2008	J. Torres	DC Comics		
Teen Titans Go!	Teen Titans Go! (2014)	36 issues	Ongoing series	February 2014 – November 2019	Sholly Fisch, Merrill Hagan, Amy Wolfram, Ricardo Sanchez, Ivan Cohen, Heather Nuhfer, Paul Morrissey, Derek Fridolfs, Marcel Maiolo, Matthew K. Manning, Amanda Deibert, Lea H. Seidman	DC Comics		
Teen Wolf	Teen Wolf	3 issues	Limited series	September 2011 – November 2011	David Tischman	Top Cow Productions, Image Comics		
Teenage Mutant Ninja Turtles (1987) (comics)	Teenage Mutant Ninja Turtles Adventures (series 1)	3 issues	Limited series	August 1988 – December 1988	Michael Dooney	Archie Comics	Adaptation of the first season of the 1987 series.	
Teenage Mutant Ninja Turtles (1987) (comics)	Teenage Mutant Ninja Turtles Adventures (series 2)	72 issues	Ongoing series	March 1989 – October 1995	Dave Garcia, Beth Mitchroney, Ken Mitchroney, Dean Clarrain, Ryan Brown, Doug Brammer, Eric Talbot, Chris Allan, Phillip Nutman, Steve Lavigne, Steve Sullivan, Brian Thomas, J.D. Vollman	Archie Comics	The first four issues are an adaptation of two second season episodes, "Return of the Shedder" and "The Incredible Shrinking Turtles".	
Teenage Mutant Ninja Turtles (1987) (comics)	Teenage Mutant Ninja Turtles Meet Archie	1 issue	One-shot	March 1991		Archie Comics	Crossover with Archie.	
Teenage Mutant Ninja Turtles (1987) (comics)	Teenage Mutant Ninja Turtles Adventures Special	11 issues	Ongoing series	June 1992 – December 1994	Steve Sullivan, Phillip Nutman, John Gentile, Dean Clarrain, Milton Knight, Bill Fitts, Brian Thomas	Archie Comics		
Teenage Mutant Ninja Turtles (1987) (comics)	Teenage Mutant Ninja Turtles Meet the Conservation Corps	1 issue	One-shot	1992		Archie Comics		
Teenage Mutant Ninja Turtles (1987) (comics)	Teenage Mutant Ninja Turtles Presents: Donatello and Leatherhead	3 issues	Limited series	July 1993 – September 1993		Archie Comics		
Teenage Mutant Ninja Turtles (1987) (comics)	Teenage Mutant Ninja Turtles Presents: Merdude	3 issues	Limited series	October 1993 – December 1993		Archie Comics		
Teenage Mutant Ninja Turtles (1987) (comics)	Teenage Mutant Ninja Turtles Adventures: The Year of the Turtle	3 issues	Limited series	January 1996 – March 1996	Dan Slott	Archie Comics		
Teenage Mutant Ninja Turtles (2003)	Teenage Mutant Ninja Turtles (2003)	7 issues	Ongoing series	June 2003 – December 2003	Peter David	Dreamwave Productions	Ongoing series cancelled after the seventh issue.	No
Teenage Mutant Ninja Turtles (2012)	Teenage Mutant Ninja Turtles New Animated Adventures	24 issues	Ongoing series	July 2013 – June 2015	Kevin Byerly, David Tipton, Scott Tipton, Erik Burnham, Cullen Bunn, Brian Smith, Derek Fridolfs, Landry Quinn Walker, Jackson Lanzing, David Server, Matthew K. Manning, Paul Allor, Caleb Goellner	IDW Publishing		
Teenage Mutant Ninja Turtles (2012)	Teenage Mutant Ninja Turtles: Amazing Adventures	14 issues	Ongoing series	August 2015 – September 2016	Landry Quinn Walker, James Kochalka, Matthew K. Manning, Peter DiCicco, Ian Flynn, Fabian Rangel, Caleb Goellner	IDW Publishing		
Teenage Mutant Ninja Turtles (2012)	Teenage Mutant Ninja Turtles: Amazing Adventures — Carmelo Anthony Special	1 issue	One-shot	2016	Matthew K. Manning	IDW Publishing		
Teenage Mutant Ninja Turtles (2012)	Teenage Mutant Ninja Turtles: Amazing Adventures — Robotanimals!	3 issues	Limited series	June – September 2017	Caleb Goellner	IDW Publishing		
The Texan	Four Color (series 2) #1027, #1096	2 issues	One-shot	September–November 1959, May–July 1960	Eric Freiwald, Robert Schaefer	Dell Comics	Tryout issues for a possible ongoing series that went unpublished.	No
T.H.E. Cat	T.H.E. Cat	4 issues	Ongoing series	March 1967 – October 1967	?	Dell Comics	Quarterly publication.	No
Thunderbirds	TV Century 21 #1–51: "Lady Penelope"	51 issues	Comic story, serial	January 23, 1965 – January 8, 1966	Tod Sullivan, Eric Eden	City Magazines	The title strip moved to its own independent magazine two weeks later.	
Thunderbirds	TV Century 21 #52–242: "Thunderbirds"	190 issues	Comic story, serial	January 15, 1966 – September 6, 1969	Alan Fennell, Frank Bellamy, Scott Goodall, Don Harley	City Magazines		
Thunderbirds	Lady Penelope	204 issues	Ongoing series	January 22, 1966 — December 13, 1969		City Magazines		
ThunderCats (1985) (comics)	ThunderCats (1985)	24 issues	Ongoing series	December 1985 – June 1988	David Micheline, Gerry Conway, Tom DeFalco, Steve Perry, Dwight Jon Zimmerman, Laura Hitchcock, Daryl Edelman, James Rose	Marvel Comics, Star Comics		
ThunderCats (1985) (comics)	ThunderCats (2002)	6 issues	Limited series	October 2002 – February 2003	J. Scott Campbell, Ford Lytle Gilmore	WildStorm		
ThunderCats (1985) (comics)	ThunderCats: The Return	5 issues	Limited series	April 2003 – August 2003	Ford Lytle Gilmore	WildStorm		
ThunderCats (1985) (comics)	ThunderCats/Battle of the Planets	1 issue	One-shot	July 2003	Kaare Andrews	WildStorm	Crossover with Battle of the Planets.	
ThunderCats (1985) (comics)	ThunderCats: Dogs of War	5 issues	Limited series	August 2003 – December 2003	John Layman	WildStorm		
ThunderCats (1985) (comics)	ThunderCats: Hammerhand's Revenge	5 issues	Limited series	December 2003 – April 2004	Fiona Avery	WildStorm		
ThunderCats (1985) (comics)	ThunderCats: Enemy's Pride	5 issues	Limited series	August 2004 – December 2004	John Layman	WildStorm		
ThunderCats (1985) (comics)	Superman/ThunderCats	1 issue	One-shot	January 2004	Judd Winick	WildStorm, DC Comics	Crossover with DC's Superman.	
ThunderCats (1985) (comics)	He-Man/ThunderCats	6 issues	Limited series	October 2016 – March 2017	Rob David, Lloyd Goldfine	DC Comics	Crossover with Mattel's He-Man and the Masters of the Universe.	
The Time Tunnel	The Time Tunnel	2 issues	Ongoing series	February 1967 – July 1967	?	Gold Key Comics		No
Tiny Toon Adventures	Tiny Toon Adventures Magazine	7 issues	Ongoing series	November 1990 – March 1992		DC Comics	Quarterly publication.	
Tombstone Territory	Four Color (series 2) #1123	1 issue	One-shot	August–October 1960	Paul S. Newman	Dell Comics	Tryout issue for a possible ongoing series that went unpublished.	No
Top Cat	Top Cat (1961)	31 issues	Ongoing series	December 1961 – September 1970		Dell Comics (#1–3), Gold Key Comics (#4–31)		
Top Cat	Hanna-Barbera Band Wagon #1, 2, 3	3 issues	Back-up feature (part of an ongoing series)	October 1962, January 1963, April 1963	?	Gold Key Comics	Top Cat was featured in an eight-page back-up story: "Yukon-t Take It with You" in #2, while his nemesis Officer Dibble was regularly featured in two prose stories in the first two issues of this series: "Trouble in Double" (#1) and "Officer Dibble's Off-Beat Day" (#2), and an untitled one-page strip in #3.	
Top Cat	Top Cat (1970)	20 issues	Ongoing series	November 1970 – November 1973		Charlton Comics		
Top Cat	Cartoon Network Presents #16	1 issue	Main feature, back-up feature (part of an ongoing series)	December 1998	Sam Henderson	DC Comics	Top Cat was featured in two self-contained stories in this issue: "It's a Wonderful Strife!" and ""Cops" Cat" (both run for eight pages total), the former story guest featuring Huckleberry Hound and Snagglepuss.	
Top Cat	Scooby-Doo Team Up #29: "Reigning Cats and Dogs"	1 issue	Main feature (part of an ongoing series)	August 23, 2017, October 2017 (cover date)	Sholly Fisch	DC Comics		
Top Cat	Superman/Top Cat Special	1 issue	One-shot	December 2018	Dan DiDio, J.M DeMatteis	DC Comics	Crossover with DC's Superman; part of the DC Meets Hanna-Barbera comic book line.	
Torchwood (comics)	Torchwood: Rift War	1 volume	Graphic novel	June 2009	Brian Williamson, Simon Furman, Ian Edginton	Titan Books		
Torchwood (comics)	Torchwood: The Official Comic	4 issues	Limited series	September 2010 – January 2011	John Barrowman, Gareth David-Lloyd, Gary Russell, Roger Gibson	Titan Comics		
Torchwood (comics)	Torchwood: World Without End	4 issues	Limited series	August 2016 – January 2017	John Barrowman, Carole Barrowman	Titan Comics		
Torchwood (comics)	Torchwood: Station Zero	4 issues	Limited series	March 2017 – June 2017	John Barrowman, Carole Barrowman	Titan Comics		
Torchwood (comics)	Torchwood: The Culling	4 issues	Limited series	November 2017 – March 2018	John Barrowman, Carole Barrowman	Titan Comics		
Toxic Crusaders	Toxic Crusaders	8 issues	Limited series	May 1992 – December 1992	Simon Furman, Hilary Barta, Doug Rice, Steve Gerber, Ann Nocenti, David Leach, Jeremy Banx, David Michelinie	Marvel Comics		
Trailer Park Boys	Trailer Park Boys Get a F#C*!ng Comic Book	1 issue	One-shot	July 2021		Devil's Due Publishing		
Trailer Park Boys	Trailer Park Boys: Bagged & Boarded	1 issue	One-shot	September 2021		Devil's Due Publishing		
Trailer Park Boys	Trailer Park Boys: House of 1000 Conkys	1 issue	One-shot	June 2022	Shawn DePasquale, Tom Molloy	Devil's Due Publishing		
Trailer Park Boys	Trailer Park Boys in the Gutters	1 issue	One-shot	September 2022		Devil's Due Publishing		
The Transformers	The Transformers #43: "The Big Broadcast of 2006"	1 issue	Comic story	August 1988	Ralph Macchio	Marvel Comics	Adapted from the episode of the same title from the 1984 TV series (Season 3, Episode 20), written by Michael Reeves.	
Transformers: Animated	Transformers: Animated – The Arrival	#5 issues	Limited series	May 2008 – December 2008	Marty Isenberg	IDW Publishing	Adapted from the three-episode storyline "Transform and Roll Out".	
Transformers: Prime	Transformers: Prime	4 issues	Limited series	January 2011		IDW Publishing		
Transformers: Prime	Transformers: Prime - Beast Hunters	8 issues	Limited series	May 2013 – December 2013	Mairghread Scott, Mike Johnson	IDW Publishing		
Transformers: Robots in Disguise	Transformers: Robots in Disguise	6 issues	Limited series	July 2015 – December 2015	Georgia Ball	IDW Publishing		
The Travels of Jaimie McPheeters	The Travels of Jaimie McPheeters	1 issue	One-shot	December 1963	Leo Dorfman	Gold Key Comics		No
Trollhunters: Tales of Arcadia	Trollhunters: Tales of Arcadia: The Secret History of Trollkind	1 volume	Graphic novel	February 2018	Richard A. Hamilton, Marc Guggenheim	Dark Horse Comics		
Trollhunters: Tales of Arcadia	Trollhunters: Tales of Arcadia: The Felled	1 volume	Graphic novel	October 2018	Richard A. Hamilton, Marc Guggenheim	Dark Horse Comics		
The Troubleshooters	Four Color (series 2) #1108	1 issue	One-shot	June–August 1960	?	Dell Comics		No
True Blood	True Blood: The Great Revelation	1 issue	One-shot	July 2008	David Wohl	Top Cow Productions		
True Blood	True Blood (series 1)	6 issues	Limited series	July 2010 – November 2010		IDW Publishing		
True Blood	True Blood (series 2)	14 issues	Ongoing series	May 2012 – June 2013	Ann Nocenti, Michael McMillian	IDW Publishing		
True Blood	True Blood: Tainted Love	6 issues	Limited series	February 2011 – July 2011		IDW Publishing		
True Blood	True Blood: The French Quarter	6 issues	Limited series	August 2011 – January 2012		IDW Publishing		
The Twilight Zone (1959)	Four Color (series 2) #1173, 1288	2 issues	One-shot	March–May 1961, February–April 1962	Leo Dorfman, Paul S. Newman	Dell Comics	Tryout issues for the eventual series.	No
The Twilight Zone (1959)	The Twilight Zone (series 1) #01-860-207, #12-860-210	2 issues	Ongoing series	May–July 1962, August–October 1962		Dell Comics		No
The Twilight Zone (1959)	The Twilight Zone (series 2)	92 issues	Ongoing series	November 1962 – May 1982		Gold Key Comics, Whitman Publishing		No
The Twilight Zone (1959)	The Twilight Zone (2015)	12 issues	Ongoing series	December 2013 – February 2015	J. Michael Straczynski	Dynamite Entertainment		
The Twilight Zone (1959)	The Twilight Zone Annual	1 issue	One-shot	June 2014	Mark Rahner	Dynamite Entertainment	Annual publication.	
The Twilight Zone (1959)	The Twilight Zone: Lost Tales	1 issue	One-shot	October 2014	Mark Rahner	Dynamite Entertainment		
The Twilight Zone (1959)	The Twilight Zone: 1959	1 issue	One-shot	2016	Tom Peyer, Mark Rahner, John Layman	Dynamite Entertainment		
The Twilight Zone (1959)	The Twilight Zone: Shadow & Substance	4 issues	Limited series	January 2015 – April 2015	Mark Rahner	Dynamite Entertainment		
The Twilight Zone (1959)	The Twilight Zone/The Shadow	4 issues	Limited series	April 2016 – July 2016	David Avallone	Dynamite Entertainment	Crossover with The Shadow.	
The Twilight Zone (1985)	The Twilight Zone (1990)	1 issue	One-shot	November 1990	Harlan Ellison, Donald F. Glut	NOW Comics		
The Twilight Zone (1985)	The Twilight Zone (1991)	11 issues	Ongoing series	November 1991 – September 1992	Bruce Jones, J. Michael Straczynski, Tony Caputo, Chuck Dixon, Chuck Wagner, Jeffrey Lang, Dean Schreck, James Van Hise, James Bradshaw, Jeff Kapalka, Joan Weis, Steven Dorfman, Lynn Barker	NOW Comics		
The Twilight Zone (1985)	The Twilight Zone (1993)	4 issues	Ongoing series	May 1993 – August 1993	Len Wein, Pat McGreal, Andrew Barlow, Robert L. Graff	NOW Comics		
The Twilight Zone (1985)	The Twilight Zone 3-D	1 issue	One-shot	April 1993	Antonio Seguro Cervera	NOW Comics	Originally published in anaglyph 3D.	

== U ==
Based on	Title	Length	Format	Publication date	Authors	Publisher	Notes	Collected editions
Ultimate Spider-Man	Ultimate Spider-Man	31 issues	Ongoing series	June 2012 – December 2014	Joe Caramagna	Marvel Comics		
Ultimate Spider-Man	Ultimate Spider-Man: Web-Warriors	12 issues	Ongoing series	January 2015 – December 2015	Joe Caramagna	Marvel Comics		
Ultimate Spider-Man	Ultimate Spider-Man: Web-Warriors - Spider-Verse	4 issues	Limited series	January 2016 – April 2016	Joe Caramagna	Marvel Comics	Adaptation of episodes 9–12 from the series' third season.	
Ultimate Spider-Man	Ultimate Spider-Man: Web-Warriors - Contest of Champions	4 issues	Limited series	May 2016 – August 2016	Joe Caramagna	Marvel Comics	Adaptation of episodes 23–26 from the series' third season.	
Ultimate Spider-Man	Ultimate Spider-Man vs. the Sinister 6	11 issues	Ongoing series	September 2016 – September 2017	Joe Caramagna	Marvel Comics		
Underdog	Underdog (Series 1)	10 issues	Ongoing series	July 1970 – January 1972	Frank Johnson	Charlton Comics		
Underdog	Underdog (Series 2)	23 issues	Ongoing series	March 1975 – February 1979		Gold Key Comics		
Underdog	Underdog (Series 3)	2 issues	Ongoing series	1987	Mark Marcus, John A. Wilcox	Spotlight Comics		
Underdog	Underdog 3-D	1 issue	One-shot	June 1988	Jorge Pacheco, Mark Marcus	Blackthorne Publishing	Originally published in anaglyph 3D.	
Underdog	Underdog Summer Special	1 issue	One-shot	October 1993	Frank Johnson, Phil Mendez	Harvey Comics		
Underdog	Underdog (Series 4)	5 issues	Ongoing series	November 1993 – July 1994	Frank Johnson	Harvey Comics		
Underdog	Underdog (Series 5)	4 issues	Ongoing series	April 2017 – September 2018	Batton Lash, James Kuhoric, S.A. Check, Buck Biggers, Chet Stover, Patrick Shand, Steve Skeates	American Mythology Productions		
Underdog	Underdog FCDB	1 issue	One-shot	May 2017	James Kuhoric, Steve Skeates	American Mythology Productions		
Underdog	Underdog 1975	1 issue	One-shot	December 2017	Steve Skeates	American Mythology Productions		
Underdog	Underdog and Pals	3 issues	Limited series	May 2019 – January 2020	Steve Skeates	American Mythology Productions		
Underdog	Underdog Halloween ComicFest	1 issue	One-shot	October 2019		American Mythology Productions		

== V ==
Based on	Title	Length	Format	Publication date	Authors	Publisher	Notes	Collected editions
V	V	18 issues	Ongoing series	February 1985 – July 1986	Cary Bates, Mindy Newell, Bob Rozakis, Paul Kupperberg	DC Comics		No
Valley of the Dinosaurs	Valley of the Dinosaurs	11 issues	Ongoing series	April 1975 – December 1976	Fred Himes, Mike Pellowski	Charlton Comics		No
The Vampire Diaries	The Vampire Diaries	6 issues	Limited series	March – August 2014	Colleen Doran, B. Clay Moore, Sean Williams, Heather Nuhfer, Bobbie Chase, Leah Moore, John Reppion	DC Comics		
The Virginian	The Virginian	1 issue	One-shot	June 1963	Paul S. Newman	Gold Key Comics		No
Voltron (comics)	Voltron: Defender of the Universe (1985)	3 issues	Limited series	1985	Henry Vogel, Mark Lerber	Modern Comics		No
Voltron (comics)	Voltron: Defender of the Universe (2003)	6 issues	Limited series	May – September 2003	Dan Jolley	Image Comics		Voltron: Complete Omnibus HC (1934692069 / 9781934692066)
Voltron (comics)	Voltron: Defender of the Universe (2004)	11 issues	Ongoing series	January – December 2004	Dan Jolley, E.J. Su, Clint Hilinski, Marie Croall, Mark Waid	Devil's Due Publishing		Voltron: Complete Omnibus HC (1934692069 / 9781934692066)
Voltron (comics)	Voltron: A Legend Forged	5 issues	Limited series	July 2008 – April 2009	Josh Blaylock	Devil's Due Publishing		Paperback: 1934692549 / 9781934692547
Voltron (comics)	Voltron (2011)	12 issues	Limited series	December 2011 – May 2013	Brandon Thomas	Dynamite Entertainment		
Voltron (comics)	Voltron: Year One	6 issues	Limited series	April – December 2012	Brandon Thomas	Dynamite Entertainment		
Voltron (comics)	Robotech/Voltron	5 issues	Limited series	2013 – September 2014	Tommy Yune, Bill Spangler	Dynamite Entertainment	Crossover with Robotech.	
Voltron (comics)	Voltron: From the Ashes	6 issues	Limited series	2015 – 2016	Cullen Bunn	Dynamite Entertainment		
Voltron: Legendary Defender	Voltron: Legendary Defender (volume 1)	5 issues	Limited series	June – December 2016	Tim Hedrick, Mitch Iverson	Lion Forge Comics		Volume One (1941302211 / 9781941302217)
Voltron: Legendary Defender	Voltron: Legendary Defender (volume 2)	5 issues	Limited series	October – November 2017	Tim Hedrick, Mitch Iverson	Lion Forge Comics		Volume One (1941302211 / 9781941302217)
Voltron: Legendary Defender	Voltron: Legendary Defender (volume 3)	5 issues	Limited series	July – November 2018	Tim Hedrick, Mitch Iverson	Lion Forge Comics		Volume One (1941302211 / 9781941302217)
Voltron Force	Voltron Force	5 volumes	Graphic novels	April 4, 2012 – February 6, 2013	Brian Smith	Viz Media		No
Voyage to the Bottom of the Sea	Voyage to the Bottom of the Sea	16 issues	Ongoing series	December 1964 – May 1969		Gold Key Comics		No

== W ==
Based on	Title	Length	Format	Publication date	Authors	Publisher	Notes	Collected editions
Wacky Races (1968)	Wacky Races (1969)	7 issues	Ongoing series	August 1969 – May 1972	Carl Fallberg	Gold Key Comics		No
Wacky Races (1968)	Hanna-Barbera Presents #2, #7	2 issues	One-shot	January 1996, September 1996	Michael Kirschenbaum	Archie Comics		
Wacky Races (1968)	Cartoon Network Presents #7, #11	2 issues	One-shot	February 1998, June 1998	Michael Kraiger, Sam Henderson, Matt Wayne	DC Comics	Back-up stories featured individually based on Dastardly and Muttley in Their Flying Machines ("Out of the Blue and Into the Red", 8 pages) and The Perils of Penelope Pitstop ("Penelope's Perplexity", 8 pages) respectively.	
Wagon Train	Four Color (series 2) #895, #971, #1019	3 issues	One-shot	March 1958, February 1959, August–October 1959	Eric Freiwald, Robert Schaefer	Dell Comics		No
Wagon Train	Wagon Train #4–13	10 issues	Ongoing series	January–March 1960 – April–June 1962		Dell Comics		No
Wanted Dead or Alive	Four Color (series 2) #1102, #1164	2 issues	One-shot	May–July 1960, March–May 1961	Gaylord DuBois	Dell Comics		No
Warehouse 13	Warehouse 13	5 issues	Limited series	August 2011 – April 2012	Ben Raab	Dynamite Entertainment		
Welcome Back, Kotter	Welcome Back, Kotter	10 issues	Ongoing series	November 1976 – March–April 1978	Elliott S. Maggin, Tony Isabella, Mark Evanier, Bob Toomey, Scott Edelman	DC Comics		No
Werewolf	Werewolf 3-D	1 issue	One-shot	Winter 1988	Lance Hampton	Blackthrone Publishing	Originally published in anaglyph 3D.	No
Werewolf	Werewolf	5 issues	Ongoing series	July 1988 – May 1989	Lance Hampton, Chris Rutowksi, Adrian Moro, John Stephenson	Blackthrone Publishing		No
Wheelie and the Chopper Bunch	Wheelie and the Chopper Bunch	7 issues	Ongoing series	May 1975 — May 1976		Charlton Comics		No
Where's Huddles?	Where's Huddles?	3 issues	Ongoing series	January — May 1971	?	Gold Key Comics		No
Whirlybirds	Four Color (series 2) #1124, #1216	2 issues	One-shot	August–October 1960, September–November 1961	Gaylord DuBois	Dell Comics		No
Wild West C.O.W.-Boys of Moo Mesa	Wild West C.O.W.-Boys of Moo Mesa (1992)	3 issues	Limited series	December 1992 – February 1993	Doug Brammer	Archie Comics		
Wild West C.O.W.-Boys of Moo Mesa	Wild West C.O.W.-Boys of Moo Mesa (1993)	3 issues	Ongoing series	March – July 1993		Archie Comics		
The Wild Wild West	The Wild Wild West (1966)	7 issues	Ongoing series	August 1966 — October 1969	Leo Dorfman	Gold Key Comics		No
The Wild Wild West	The Wild Wild West (1990)	4 issues	Ongoing series	October 1990 — January 1991	Mark Ellis, Paul Davis	Millennium Publications		No
Winky Dink and You	Four Color (series 2) #663	1 issue	One-shot	November 1955	?	Dell Comics		No
Winky Dink and You	Adventures of Winky Dink #75	1 issue	One-shot	March 1957	Marv Levy	Pines Comics		No
Wish Kid	NBC Saturday Morning Comics #1: "Captain Mayhem"	1 issue	One-shot	September 1991		Harvey Comics	Adaptation of the series' fourth overall episode.	No
Wonder Woman (comics)	Wonder Woman '77 Special	4 issues	Limited series	July 2015 – November 2016	Marc Andreyko	DC Comics		
Wonder Woman (comics)	Wonder Woman '77 Meets the Bionic Woman	6 issues	Limited series	December 2016 – September 2017	Andy Mangels	DC Comics, Dynamite Entertainment	Crossover with The Bionic Woman.	
Wonder Woman (comics)	Batman '66 Meets Wonder Woman '77	6 issues	Limited series	March – August 2017	Jeff Parker, Marc Andreyko	DC Comics	Crossover with Batman '66.	

== X ==
Based on	Title	Length	Format	Publication date	Authors	Publisher	Notes	Collected editions
The X-Files	The X-Files (1995)	42	Ongoing series	January 1995 — September 1998		Topps Comics		
The X-Files	The X-Files Annual	2 issues	Annual	August 1995; 1996	Stefan Petrucha, John Rozum	Topps Comics		
The X-Files	The X-Files: Ground Zero	4 issues	Limited series	December 1997 — March 1998	Kevin J. Anderson	Topps Comics	Adaptation of the spin-off novel.	
The X-Files	The X-Files (2008)	7 issues	Limited series	September 2008 — June 2009	Frank Spotnitz, Marv Wolfman, Doug Moench	WildStorm		
The X-Files	The X-Files/30 Days of Night	9 issues	Limited series	September 2010 — February 2011	Steve Miles, Adam Jones	WildStorm, IDW Publishing	Crossover with 30 Days of Night; co-published with IDW.	
The X-Files	The X-Files: Season 10	25 issues	Ongoing series	June 2013 — June 2015	Joe Harris	IDW Publishing		
The X-Files	The X-Files: Conspiracy	2 issues	Limited series	January — March 2014	Paul Crilley	IDW Publishing	Crossover storyline involving other IDW-licensed properties; the series continued through four one-shot tie-ins.	
The X-Files	The X-Files: Case Files – Florida Man	2 issues	Limited series	April — May 2018	Delilah Dawson, Elena Casagrande	IDW Publishing		
The X-Files	The X-Files: Season 11	8 issues	Limited series	August 2015 — March 2016	Joe Harris	IDW Publishing		
The X-Files	The X-Files: Origins	4 issues	Limited series	August — November 2016	Jody Houser, Matthew Dow Smith	IDW Publishing		
The X-Files	The X-Files: Origins – Dog Days of Summer	4 issues	Limited series	June — September 2017	Jody Houser, Matthew Dow Smith	IDW Publishing	Sequel to Origins.	
The X-Files	The X-Files: JFK Disclosure	2 issues	Limited series	October — November 2017	Denton J. Tipton	IDW Publishing		
The X-Files	The X-Files: Case Files – Hoot Goes There?	2 issues	Limited series	July — August 2018	Joe Lansdale, Keith Lansdale	IDW Publishing		
X-Men: The Animated Series	X-Men Adventures	53	Ongoing series	November 1992 – March 1997	Ralph Macchio	Marvel Comics		
X-Men: The Animated Series	X-Men '92	4 issues	Limited series	August – November 2015	Chris Sims, Chad Bowers	Marvel Comics	Tie-in to the Secret Wars event.	
X-Men: Evolution	X-Men: Evolution	9 issues	Limited series	February – September 2002	Devin Grayson	Marvel Comics		
Xena: Warrior Princess	Xena: Warrior Princess (1997)	3	Limited series	August – October 1997	Roy Thomas, Robert (Salmoneus) Trebor and Aaron Lopresti	Topps Comics		
Xena: Warrior Princess	Xena: Warrior Princess: Year One	1 issue	One-shot	August 1997	Roy Thomas	Topps Comics		
Xena: Warrior Princess	Xena: Warrior Princess/Joxer: Warrior Prince	3 issues	Limited series	November 1997 – January 1998	Tom Bierbaum, Mary Bierbaum	Topps Comics		
Xena: Warrior Princess	Xena: Warrior Princess: The Dragon's Teeth	3 issues	Limited series	December 1997 – February 1998	Roy Thomas	Topps Comics		
Xena: Warrior Princess	Xena: Warrior Princess vs. Callisto	3 issues	Limited series	February – March 1998	Roy Thomas	Topps Comics		
Xena: Warrior Princess	Xena: Warrior Princess: The Orpheus Trilogy	3 issues	Limited series	March – May 1998	Tom Bierbaum, Mary Bierbaum	Topps Comics		
Xena: Warrior Princess	Xena: Warrior Princess: Blood Lines	2 issues	Limited series	May – June 1998	Aaron Lopresti	Topps Comics		
Xena: Warrior Princess	Xena: Warrior Princess and the Original Olympics	3 issues	Limited series	June – August 1998	Tom Bierbaum, Mary Bierbaum	Topps Comics		
Xena: Warrior Princess	The Marriage of Hercules and Xena	1 issue	One-shot	July 1998	Tom Bierbaum, Mary Bierbaum	Topps Comics		
Xena: Warrior Princess	Xena: Warrior Princess: The Wrath of Hera	2 issues	Limited series	September – October 1998	Trina Robbins	Topps Comics		
Xena: Warrior Princess	Xena: Warrior Princess (1999)	14 issues	Ongoing series	September 1999 – October 2000	John Wagner, Ian Edgington	Dark Horse Comics		
Xena: Warrior Princess	Xena: Warrior Princess (2006)	4 issues	Limited series	July — November 2006	John Layman, Fabiano Neves	Dynamite Entertainment		
Xena: Warrior Princess	Army of Darkness/Xena: Warrior Princess: Why Not?	4 issues	Limited series	March – July 2008	John Layman, Brandon Jerwa	Dynamite Entertainment	First and second crossovers with Army of Darkness.	Paperback: 1-60690-008-0 / 978-1-60690-008-6
Xena: Warrior Princess	Xena: Warrior Princess/Army of Darkness: What... Again?!	4 issues	Limited series	October 2008 – January 2009	John Layman, Brandon Jerwa	Dynamite Entertainment	First and second crossovers with Army of Darkness.	Paperback: 1-60690-032-3 / 978-1-60690-032-1
Xena: Warrior Princess	Xena: Warrior Princess (2016)	6 issues	Limited series	April – September 2016	Genevieve Valentine	Dynamite Entertainment		
Xena: Warrior Princess	Army of Darkness/Xena: Warrior Princess: Forever... and a Day	6 issues	Limited series	October 2016 – January 2017	Scott Lobdell	Dynamite Entertainment	Third crossover with Army of Darkness.	Paperback: 1-52410-351-9 / 978-1-52410-351-4
Xena: Warrior Princess	Xena: Warrior Princess (2018)	10 issues	Limited series	February – November 2018	Meredith Finch, Erica Schultz	Dynamite Entertainment		
Xena: Warrior Princess	Xena: Warrior Princess (2019)	6 issues	Vita Ayala	April – September 2019	John Layman, Fabiano Neves	Dynamite Entertainment		

== Y ==
Based on	Title	Length	Format	Publication date	Authors	Publisher	Notes	Collected editions
Yo Yogi!	NBC Saturday Morning Comics #1: "Super Duper Snag"	1 issue	Comic story	September 1991		Harvey Comics	Adaptation of the sixth episode from the eponymous series, which aired on October 19, 1991 after the issue's publication.	No
The Yogi Bear Show	Four Color (series 2) #1162: "Yogi Bear Joins the Marines"	1 issue	One-shot	May–July 1961		Dell Comics	Continued from Four Color #1104; the comic features three self-contained stories: the eponymous 29-page story and two further one-page stories "Double Duty" and "Timely Tip".	
The Yogi Bear Show	Yogi Bear (1961) #4–42	39 issues	Ongoing series	September 1961 – October 1970		Dell Comics, Gold Key Comics		
The Yogi Bear Show	Four Color (series 2) #1271: "Yogi Bear Birthday Party"	1 issue	One-shot	December 1961-February 1962		Dell Comics	Plot very loosely based on the series finale "Yogi's Birthday Party", which aired on January 6, 1962 during the issue's publication; storyline continued through seven following stories, "The No Lard Bodyguard" (5 pages), "To the Rescue", "Parade Plight", "Detected Detectives" and "Lost by a Nose" (all 3 pages each), "Go Go Goes Goody Goody" (6 pages) and "The Strange Ranger" (2 pages).	
The Yogi Bear Show	Four Color (series 2) #1349: "Yogi Bear Visits the U.N."	1 issue	One-shot	January 1962	Paul S. Newman	Dell Comics	The comic features four self-contained stories: the one-page story "The Route", the eponymous 32-page title story and two further one-page stories "Paper Work" and "Secret Mission".	
The Yogi Bear Show	Hanna-Barbera Band Wagon #1, 2, 3	3 issues	Back-up feature (part of an ongoing series)	October 1962, January 1963, April 1963	?	Gold Key Comics	Snagglepuss and Yakky Doodle were both featured in back-up stories in all three issues of this title; Snagglepuss was seen in four strips: "Joust a Jester" (#1), two untitled stories (one eight-page story, notable for the first comic guest appearance of Mr. & Mrs. J. Evil Scientist, and a one page strip on inside back cover; both #2), and "All's Swell That Ends Swell" (#3) and Yakky Doodle had two strips: "Strain on the Train" (#1) and "Itty-Bitty Buddy-guard" (#2).	
The Yogi Bear Show	Snagglepuss	4 issues	Ongoing series	October 1962 – June 1963		Gold Key Comics	Snooper and Bladder and Lippy the Lion and Hardy Har Har were guest featured in the latter two issues of the series.	
The Yogi Bear Show	Yakky Doodle and Chopper	1 issue	One-shot	December 1962		Gold Key Comics	The prose story "The Over-Grown Good Deed" guest features Loopy De Loop; the fifth comic story "Foot Foolery" guest features Snagglepuss.	
The Yogi Bear Show	Yogi Bear (1970)	35 issues	Ongoing series	November 1970 – January 1977		Charlton Comics		
The Yogi Bear Show	Hanna-Barbera Parade #1, 2, 4, 6, 7, 8, 9, 10	8 issues	Main feature, back-up feature (part of an ongoing series)	September 1971, November 1971, February 1972, April 1972, May 1972, July 1972, October 1972, December 1972	Gwen Krause (#7, #8), Ray Dirgo (#7)	Charlton Comics	Yogi Bear, Yakky Doodle and Snagglepuss were all featured in back-up stories in this bimonthly title; both Yogi Bear and Yakky Doodle were featured in most stories, with Yogi appearing in a total of nine in seven issues apart and Yakky appearing in a total of ten in eight issues apart, for Yogi Bear: "Hard Times Comin'" (#2), "The Baby Sitter" and "Don't Pick the Flowers" (#4), "Banner Year" (#5) "Happy Birthday, Mr. Smith" (#6), "The Golden Egg" and "The Dreamer" (#7), "The Old Gray Bear" (#8) and "Right On" (#10), for Yakky Doodle: "The Trap" (#1), "Happy Birthday!" (#2), "There's No Place Like Home" (#4), "Fibber Takes a Dive!" and "The Big Blast!" (#6), "In a Stew (Almost)" and "An Itch in Time..." (#7), "Figure Eight" (#8), "The Big Night" (#9) and "On Target" (#10). Snagglepuss had featured only one two-page back-up story: "The Soda Jerk" (#6);	
The Yogi Bear Show	Hanna-Barbera Summer Picnic #3	1 issue	Main feature (part of an ongoing series)	Summer 1971	?	Charlton Comics	Continued from Hanna-Barbera Parade #2; Yogi was featured in the eight-page main feature story of this issue: "Every Litter Bit Hurts!". Yakky Doodle and Chopper were mainly featured in the issue's cover and activity pages.	
The Yogi Bear Show	Hanna-Barbera's Yogi Bear (1977)	9 issues	Ongoing series	November 1977 – March 1979	Mark Evanier	Marvel Comics		
The Yogi Bear Show	Hanna-Barbera Spotlight #3, 4	2 issues	Back-up feature (part of an ongoing series)	September 1978	Mark Evanier	Marvel Comics	Yakky Doodle and Snagglepuss were both featured in back-up stories in two issues adapt: Yakky in "Fry Now, Play Later" (#3) and Snagglepuss in "Chunky Chiller" (#4), the latter guest featuring Huckleberry Hound (from his eponymous show).	
The Yogi Bear Show	Yogi Bear (1992)	6 issues	Ongoing series	September 1992 – March 1994	Gwen Krause, Joe Gill, Ray Dirgo	Harvey Comics		
The Yogi Bear Show	Hanna-Barbera All-Stars #1, 2, 3, 4	4 issues	Main feature (part of an ongoing series)	October 1995, November 1995, April 1996	Mike Kirschenbaum (#2)	Archie Comics	Yogi was featured in main feature stories in all four issues of this series: "Relatively Speaking" and "Oh Doctor!" (both #1), "Hello, Good Buddy!" (#2) and "Bear in Arms" (#4).	
The Yogi Bear Show	Cartoon Network Presents: Yogi Bear	1 issue	One-shot	May 1997	Scott Jeralds	Archie Comics	The comic features five self-contained stories: "Big City Bears", "The Bear Truth!", "A Nose for News", "The Artist" and "Pledge Weak!".	
The Yogi Bear Show	Cartoon Network Presents #2, 22	2 issues	Back-up feature (part of an ongoing series)	September 1997, June 1999	Sam Henderson (#2), Mike Kraiger (#22)	DC Comics	Yogi Bead was featured in two back-up stories in two issues of this series apart: "Hermit Helper" (#2, 8 pages total) and "Brain Food" (#22, 6 pages total).	
The Yogi Bear Show	Deathstroke/Yogi Bear Special	1 issue	One-shot	December 2018	Frank Tieri, J. M. DeMatteis	DC Comics	Crossover with DC's Deathstroke; part of the DC Meets Hanna-Barbera comic book line.	
The Yogi Bear Show	Scooby-Doo Team Up #35: "Bear-ly Scared"	1 issue	Main feature (part of an ongoing series)	March 27, 2019, May 2019 (cover date)	Sholly Fisch	DC Comics		
Yogi's Treasure Hunt	Cartoon Network Presents #18	1 issue	Main feature (part of an ongoing series)	February 1999	Terry Collins	DC Comics	Two self-contained stories in this issue: "The Murgatroid Asteroid" (12 pages) and "Oil's Well That Ends Well" (10 pages).	
The Young Indiana Jones Chronicles	The Young Indiana Jones Chronicles	12 issues	Limited series	February 1992 – February 1993	Dan Barry	Dark Horse Comics		Vol. 1: The Curse of the Jackal (1-56115-288-9); Vol. 2: The Search for the Oryx (1-56115-289-7); Vol. 3: The Peril of the Fort (1-56115-290-0)
Young Justice	Young Justice	26 issues	Ongoing series	March 2011 – April 2013	Greg Weisman, Kevin Hopps	DC Comics	25 regular issues and an issue #0.	Vol. 1 TPB; Vol. 2: Training Day TPB; Vol. 3: Creature Features TPB; Vol. 4: Invasion TPB
The Young Lawyers	The Young Lawyers	2 issues	Ongoing series	January – April 1971		Dell Comics	Each issue features two self-contained stories: the first issue, "Team Spirit" (17 pages) and "Kids Are People" (15 pages); the second issue, "Under the Skin..." (19 pages) and "Explosive Justice" (15 pages).	No
The Young Rebels	The Young Rebels	1 issue	One-shot	January 1971		Dell Comics	The comic features two self-contained stories: "Phantom Army" and "Greek Fire", both run for 16 pages.	No
Your Friendly Neighborhood Spider-Man	Your Friendly Neighborhood Spider-Man	4 issues	Limited series	February – June 2025	Christos Gage	Marvel Comics	Prequel to the eponymous series.	
Yu-Gi-Oh!	Yu-Gi-Oh! 5D's		Serialized manga	August 21, 2009 – January 21, 2015	Masahiro Hikokubo	Shueisha	Serialized in V Jump.	Collected in 9 tankōbon volumes.
Yu-Gi-Oh!	Yu-Gi-Oh! Arc-V		Serialized manga	August 21, 2015 – April 19, 2019	Shin Yoshida	Shueisha	Serialized in V Jump.	Collected in 7 tankōbon volumes.
Yu-Gi-Oh!	Yu-Gi-Oh! GX		Serialized manga	December 17, 2005 – March 19, 2011	Naoyuki Kageyama	Shueisha	Serialized in V Jump.	Collected in 9 tankōbon volumes.
Yu-Gi-Oh!	Yu-Gi-Oh! D-Team Zexal		Serialized manga	April 6, 2012 – May 19, 2014	Akihiro Tomonaga	Shueisha	Serialized in Saikyō Jump.	

== Z ==
Based on	Title	Length	Format	Publication date	Authors	Publisher	Notes	Collected editions
Z Nation	Z Nation	5 issues	Limited series	April – October 2017	Craig Engler, Fred Van Lente	Dynamite Entertainment	Prequel to the eponymous Syfy TV series.	Z Nation: Sea of Death TP: 152410454X/978-1524104542
Zorro (1957)	Four Color (series 2) #882, #920, #933, #960, #976, #1003, #1037: "Walt Disney's Zorro"	7 issues		February 1958, June 1958, September 1958, December 1958, March 1959, June 1959, September–November 1959		Dell Comics		

== See also ==
- Lists of comics based on media
  - List of comics based on films
  - List of comics based on fiction
  - List of comics based on Hasbro properties
  - List of comics based on unproduced film projects
  - List of comics based on video games
- List of media based on comics
  - List of films based on comics
  - List of comic-based films directed by women
  - List of television programs based on comics
  - List of video games based on comics
- Lists of media based on television programs
  - List of films based on television programs
- Lists of television programs based on media
  - List of television programs based on comics
  - List of television programs based on video games
