= Wacky Races =

Hanna-Barbera media franchise

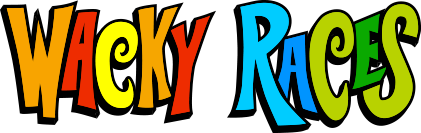
- Franchise logo since 2017
- Created by: William Hanna; Joseph Barbera
- Original work: Wacky Races (1968–69)
- Owners: Warner Bros. Entertainment (Skydance)
- Years: 1968–present

Print publications
- Comics: Wacky Raceland

Films and television
- Short films: Wacky Races Forever; Dastardly & Muttley
- Animated series: Wacky Races; Dastardly and Muttley in Their Flying Machines; The Perils of Penelope Pitstop; Fender Bender 500; Wacky Races (2017)

Games
- Video games: Wacky Races (1991); Wacky Races (2000); Wacky Races/Wacky Races: Starring Dastardly and Muttley; Wacky Races: Mad Motors; Wacky Races: Crash and Dash

Wacky Races is a media franchise containing five animated series, several video games, and a comic book, with most centered on the theme of various Hanna-Barbera cartoon characters primarily engaged in over-the-top auto racing (although occasionally employing other means of transportation) with odd vehicles and absurd plot developments.

== Television ==
- Wacky Races (1968 TV series), the original and classic TV series
- Dastardly and Muttley in Their Flying Machines, a spin-off featuring Dick Dastardly and Muttley
- The Perils of Penelope Pitstop, a spin-off featuring Penelope Pitstop and the Ant Hill Mob
- Fender Bender 500, a spin-off featuring Dick Dastardly and Muttley
- Wacky Races (2017 TV series), a sequel to the original series

== Video games ==
- Wacky Races (1991 video game), by Atlus for NES
- Wacky Races (2000 video game), by Appaloosa for PlayStation, Windows and Game Boy Color
- Wacky Races/Wacky Races: Starring Dastardly and Muttley 2000/2001, by Infogrames for Dreamcast and PlayStation 2
- Wacky Races: Mad Motors, 2007, by Coyote and Blast! for PlayStation 2
- Wacky Races: Crash and Dash, 2008, by Eidos for Nintendo DS and Wii

== Other ==
- Wacky Races Forever, a 2006 animated short, produced by Warner Bros. Animation
- Dastardly & Muttley, a 2023 stop-motion animated short, produced by Waaber
- Wacky Raceland, a comic book series envisioning the original racers in a more comic-book realistic style
- Wacky Races: The Board Game, 2019, by CMON, Inc.
