= List of Hanna-Barbera–based video games =

This is a list of video games based on various Hanna-Barbera cartoon series. The list is not complete or exhaustive.

== List ==
=== Yogi Bear ===
- Yogi's Frustration (1983)
- Yogi Bear (1987)
- Yogi Bear & Friends in The Greed Monster (1989)
- Yogi's Great Escape (1990)
- Yogi Bear's Math Adventures (1990)
- Yogi's Big Clean Up (1992)
- Adventures of Yogi Bear (1994)
- Yogi Bear's Gold Rush (1994)
- Yogi Bear: Great Balloon Blast (2000)
- Yogi Bear: The Video Game (2010)

=== The Flintstones ===
- Yabba Dabba Doo! (1986)
- The Flintstones (1988)
- The Flintstones: Dino: Lost in Bedrock (1991)
- The Flintstones: The Rescue of Dino & Hoppy (1991)
- The Flintstones: King Rock Treasure Island (1993)
- The Flintstones (1993)
- The Flintstones: Surprise at Dinosaur Peak (1994)
- The Flintstones: The Treasure of Sierra Madrock (1994)
- Fred Flintstone's Memory Match (1994)
- Flintstones/Jetsons Time Warp (1994)
- The Flintstones: The Movie (1994/1995)
- The Flintstones (a.k.a. Fred in Magic Wood Land) (1998)
- The Flintstones: Bedrock Bowling (2000)
- The Flintstones: BurgerTime in Bedrock (2000)
- The Flintstones: Big Trouble in Bedrock (2001)
- The Flintstones in Viva Rock Vegas (2002)

=== The Jetsons ===
- The Jetsons' Ways with Words (1984)
- The Jetsons: By George, in Trouble Again (1990)
- The Jetsons: George Jetson and the Legend of Robotopia (1990)
- Jetsons: The Computer Game (1991)
- The Jetsons: Cogswell's Caper! (1992)
- The Jetsons: Robot Panic (1992)
- The Jetsons: Mealtime Malfunction (1993)
- The Jetsons: Invasion of the Planet Pirates (1994)
- Flintstones/Jetsons Time Warp (1994)

=== Wacky Races ===
- Wacky Races (1991)
- Wacky Races (2000)
- Wacky Races: Starring Dastardly and Muttley (2001)
- Wacky Races: Mad Motors (2007)
- Wacky Races: Crash and Dash (2008)

=== Scooby-Doo ===
- Scooby-Doo's Maze Chase (1983)
- Scooby-Doo (a.k.a. Scooby Doo in the Castle Mystery) (1986)
- Scooby-Doo and Scrappy-Doo (1991)
- Scooby-Doo Mystery (1995)
- Scooby-Doo! Mystery of the Fun Park Phantom (1999)
- Scooby-Doo! Mystery Adventures (2000) (series)
  - Scooby-Doo: Showdown in Ghost Town (2000)
  - Scooby-Doo: Phantom of the Knight (2000)
  - Scooby-Doo: Jinx at the Sphinx (2000)
- Scooby-Doo! Classic Creep Capers (2000)
- Scooby-Doo and the Cyber Chase (2001)
- Scooby-Doo (2002)
- Scooby-Doo! Night of 100 Frights (2002)
- Scooby-Doo Case Files (2003) (series)
  - Scooby-Doo Case File Number 1: The Glowing Bug Man (2003)
  - Scooby-Doo Case File Number 2: The Scary Stone Dragon (2003)
  - Scooby-Doo Case File Number 3: Frights, Camera, Mystery! (2003)
- Scooby-Doo! Mystery Mayhem (2003)
- Scooby-Doo 2: Monsters Unleashed (2004)
- Scooby-Doo! Unmasked (2005)
- Scooby-Doo! First Frights (2009)
- Scooby-Doo! and the Spooky Swamp (2010)
- Scooby Doo! Mystery Cases (2018)

== See also ==
- List of Tom and Jerry video games
