= Jetson =

Jetson, Jetsons or The Jetsons may refer to:

- The Jetsons, an animated TV show that first aired in 1962, and the title family
  - The Jetsons (comics), a comic book series based on the TV series
  - Jetsons: The Movie, a 1990 animated musical film based on the TV series
  - The Jetsons: Cogswell's Caper!, a 1993 video game
  - The Jetsons: Invasion of the Planet Pirates, a 1994 video game

== Geography ==
- Jetson, Kentucky, United States, an unincorporated community
- Jetson Center for Youth, a former juvenile prison in East Baton Rouge Parish, Louisiana, United States

== Transportation ==
- Jetson One electric aircraft eVTOL

== Products ==
- Nvidia Jetson, a series of computing boards

== See also ==
- The Jetzons, an American new wave band
