= The Perils of Penelope Pitstop =

American animated television series

- Genre: Comedy
- Created by: William Hanna; Joseph Barbera
- Written by: Joe Ruby; Ken Spears; Michael Maltese
- Directed by: William Hanna; Joseph Barbera
- Starring: Mel Blanc; Paul Lynde (uncredited); Don Messick; Janet Waldo; Paul Winchell
- Narrated by: Gary Owens
- Composer: Ted Nichols
- Country of origin: United States
- Original language: English
- No. of seasons: 1
- No. of episodes: 17

Production
- Producers: William Hanna; Joseph Barbera
- Running time: 21 minutes
- Production company: Hanna-Barbera Productions

Original release
- Network: CBS
- Release: September 13, 1969 – January 17, 1970

Related
- Wacky Races (1968); Dastardly and Muttley in Their Flying Machines; Fender Bender 500; Wacky Races (2017)

The Perils of Penelope Pitstop is an American Saturday morning animated television series produced by Hanna-Barbera Productions that premiered on CBS on September 13, 1969. The show ran for one season with a total of 17 half-hour episodes, the last first-run episode airing on January 17, 1970. Repeats aired Sunday mornings on CBS until September 4, 1971; and in syndication as Fun World of Hanna-Barbera from 1976 to 1982. It is a spin-off of Wacky Races, reprising the characters of Penelope Pitstop and the Ant Hill Mob. Rebroadcasts of the show air on the Cartoon Network-owned channel Boomerang, as well as MeTV Toons.

== Production ==
The series was patterned on the silent movie era melodrama cliffhanger movie serial The Perils of Pauline. It originally was to also star the characters of Dick Dastardly and Muttley, though Dastardly and Muttley were later dropped in pre-production. Those characters would be later reused in their own series, Dastardly and Muttley in Their Flying Machines.

Joe Ruby and Ken Spears were the head writers for the series, and Ruby, Spears, and Warner Bros. Cartoons veteran Michael Maltese wrote the stories for the individual episodes. Deciding to feature the characters in a different setting, studio heads decided to set the characters into an active adventure format strongly reminiscent of the 1910s.

== Plot ==
The series features characters from Wacky Races, Penelope Pitstop and the Ant Hill Mob, the latter of whom take on the role of heroes in contrast to their previously nefarious personalities.

In each episode, Penelope's guardian, Sylvester Sneekly, attempts to claim Penelope's inheritance for himself by attacking her in the disguise of his sinister alter-ego the Hooded Claw. Aided by his twin henchmen the Bully Brothers, who always speak in unison, the Claw creates overly elaborate Rube Goldberg-style plots to do away with Penelope. Even though the Ant Hill Mob often come to Penelope's rescue, she herself often needs to save the Mob from the unintended effects of their attempts to rescue her. But just as quickly as Penelope is delivered from one quandary, she almost immediately finds herself ensnared in another one of the Claw's traps. Despite their overall bumbling, however, the Ant Hill Mob always manage to rescue Penelope and foil the Hooded Claw's plans in the end.

While Penelope is helpless whenever the Hooded Claw grabs her, once he leaves her tied up for his fiendish plans to take effect she usually becomes resourceful and ingenious, sometimes coming up with spontaneous or creative methodologies to escape her own predicaments.

== Characters ==
- Penelope Pitstop is the title character and the protagonist of the spin-off. She is the heiress who inherits the Pitstops' vast fortune, but is unaware that her guardian, Sylvester Sneekly, who disguises himself as the Hooded Claw, has plans to kill her for her fortune. She is often rescued by the Ant Hill Mob from her perils and she also rescues them when they fail to rescue her. Despite constantly being portrayed as the typical damsel in distress, Penelope is shown to be clever and resourceful when in danger.
- The Ant Hill Mob is a group of seven adventurers. This incarnation is vastly altered from their Wacky Races incarnation where they are active gangsters constantly being chased by various law officials into a collection of thrill seekers who openly reflect characteristics of the Seven Dwarfs of the fairy tale Snow White and the Seven Dwarfs. The Mob are usually the ones called upon to rescue Penelope when she is caught in one of the Hooded Claw's schemes.
  - Clyde: The Moe Howard-like leader of the Mob. He is the only character who retains his Wacky Races format though drastically reduced in the Wacky Races aggressive nature.
  - Dum Dum: comedic foil to "straight man" Clyde and is the marksman of the group despite his reduced intellect. He had gone by the name Ring-a-Ding in Wacky Races.
  - Pockets: inventor and technical support person of the group who carries an excessive number of devices or creating such devices from the source material he carries in his multitude of pockets visible on his suit.
  - Snoozy: A constantly sleeping character.
  - Softy: Cries at any opportunity, often at ironic times (often heard sobbing "Penelope is saved!").
  - Yak Yak: In many ways Softy’s opposite, Yak Yak instead chuckles at any opportunity, including inappropriate ones ("Hee-hee-hee-hee-hee-hoo! We're gonna crash! Hee-hee-hee-hee-hee-hoo!").
  - Zippy: A character with impressive speed.
- Chugga-Boom (a.k.a. Chuggie): The Ant Hill Mob's sentient touring car.
- Sylvester Sneekly/the Hooded Claw: The guardian of Penelope Pitstop and the main antagonist of the spin-off, who plots to kill Penelope to inherit her vast fortune. Described by the show's narrator as "that villain of villains" in his disguise as the Hooded Claw, he manages to capture or kidnap Penelope, who is unaware of her guardian's secret identity. In most episodes, he usually makes deadly traps for Penelope to get her killed and thereby get her inheritance. However, he always fails to kill Penelope when the Ant Hill Mob rescues her or Penelope outsmarts him when she manages to free herself from his traps. When his plans are foiled, he angrily yells "Blast!"
  - The Bully Brothers: The Hooded Claw's henchmen. The two large goons speak almost entirely in unison in a guttural voice: "Right, Claw."

== Cast ==
- Janet Waldo as Penelope Pitstop
- Mel Blanc as Yak Yak, Chug-a-Boom, the Bully Brothers
- Don Messick as Dum Dum, Snoozy, Pockets, Zippy
- Paul Winchell as Clyde, Softy
- Gary Owens as Narrator
- Paul Lynde as Sylvester Sneekly/the Hooded Claw (uncredited)

== Episodes ==
No.	Title	Original release date	Prod. code
1	"Jungle Jeopardy"	September 13, 1969	46-1
Penelope is about to complete the last leg of an around-the-world flight as a surprise for her guardian, Sylvester Sneekly. The Hooded Claw and the Bully Brothers have sabotaged her plane and are watching her as the engines conk out. The Ant Hill Mob makes an attempt to rescue her as she jumps from the plane and into an empty eagle's nest. After that, she takes her chances in the jungle, fighting against all sorts of dangers. Will the Hooded Claw get to her first and send her to her doom or will the Ant Hill Mob get there first and rescue her?
2	"The Terrible Trolley Trap"	September 20, 1969	46-2
The Hooded Claw and the Bully Brothers tie Penelope to some trolley tracks hoping to get rid of her once and for all. After that, she is taken into the ocean, on a ship that belongs to the Hooded Claw, where he plans to get rid of her permanently. Will the Ant Hill Mob be able to find Penelope before it is too late?
3	"The Boardwalk Booby Trap"	September 27, 1969	46-4
Penelope is spending a relaxing day at the beach being buried in the sand by the Ant Hill Mob. The Hooded Claw has mixed in cement with the sand so she cannot get out. Along comes a bulldozer driven by the Bully Brothers. The Ant Hill Mob cannot pull her up, so they dig a tunnel to pull her down. They save her in the nick of time. Later, Penelope is kidnapped by the Bully Brothers during a scavenger hunt and taken to an abandoned fishing village, where the Hooded Claw awaits her. Will the Ant Hill Mob come crashing in to save her in time?
4	"Wild West Peril"	October 4, 1969	46-5
Penelope is driving in her car when she crashes through a false front trap set by the Hooded Claw. The Ant Hill Mob races to the rescue with a mattress strapped to the top of their car to save her. Then a trap is set on the edge of a cliff, designed to lure the Mob in and fall off the edge, hitting a board that will catapult Penelope in a barrel, and the Ant Hill Mob into the near-bottomless canyon. She is then finally placed in a miner's car filled with explosives, which is set to rocket down to the bottom of a steep and deep mine shaft. Will she be saved in time?
5	"Carnival Calamity"	October 11, 1969	46-8
Penelope is on her way to the carnival. Unknown to her, the Hooded Claw has set a trap for her. The Bully Brothers have set a trap of their own for the Ant Hill Mob so they cannot save her. Penelope gets out of trouble on her own and continues on to the carnival, where she gets in more sticky situations.
6	"The Treacherous Movie Lot Plot"	October 18, 1969	46-6
Penelope has gone to Hollywood to star in a movie. The Hooded Claw adds a scene to the movie that involves Penelope being taken off by a giant King Kong-like ape, which was not written in the script. After the Ant Hill Mob saves her from certain doom, she continues to film the movie, but the Hooded Claw still has a few tricks upon his sleeve. Will the Ant Hill Mob be fast enough to save her?
7	"Arabian Desert Danger"	October 25, 1969	46-7
Penelope is trying to escort a rare white baby camel out of Egypt so she can donate it to the Children's Zoo. The Hooded Claw traps her in a giant tent that he and the Bully Brothers fill with hot air to make a balloon. The Ant Hill Mob see this and move in to help. After that rescue, Penelope is taken into a pyramid, where she will be mummified alive. It is up to the Ant Hill Mob to save her from this tight situation.
8	"The Diabolical Department Store Danger"	November 1, 1969	46-9
Penelope is at Pitstop's Department Store to help introduce the new Paris fashions. Little did she know that the Hooded Claw and the Bully Brothers were inside, setting a few traps for her.
9	"Hair Raising Harness Race"	November 8, 1969	46-3
Penelope is at the County Fair and determined to win the Pitstop Gold Cup for the main event, the harness race. The Hooded Claw attempts to sabotage Penelope's efforts of winning the race. The Ant Hill Mob sees her in danger and tries to save her. This was the only episode where Penelope gets to rescue herself with her intelligence throughout the episode whereas all attempts of the Ant Hill Mob fail, as well as the only episode where she does not get tied up by the Hooded Claw.
10	"North Pole Peril"	November 15, 1969	46-11
Penelope is paddling up the Nanook River in a kayak seeking to become the first woman to reach the North Pole. Unfortunately, the Hooded Claw is following her in a paddle-wheeler and attempting to chop her up in the blades. She is nearly in danger and the Hooded Claw chases her. The Ant Hill Mob is on their way to save her. Will they be in time to save her, so she can finish her journey?
11	"Tall Timber Treachery"	November 22, 1969	46-10
Penelope is on her way to the "Pitstop Lumber Camp" where she has been elected Queen of the Indian Summer Festival. The Hooded Claw and the Bully Brothers unhook her rail car and she goes sailing back down the railroad track. The Ant Hill Mob gets her out of the jam and offer her a ride to the festival. But unfortunately, the Hooded Claw does not give up that easily, and he will do everything to kill Penelope, even if he has to chop down all of the trees in the forest to do it.
12	"Cross Country Double Cross"	November 29, 1969	46-12
Penelope is making a daring parachute jump to publicize a statue unveiling. The Hooded Claw cuts the parachute lines in an attempt to stop her once and for all. Unfortunately for Penelope, the Bully Brothers are helping the Hooded Claw and they capture her and place her in a pit. After she is rescued, the Ant Hill Mob tell her that the unveiling is supposed to be on the other side of the country, and Penelope has to travel through the country as quickly as possible to get there. Will Penelope be able to get there on time?
13	"Big Bagdad Danger"	December 6, 1969	46-13
Penelope is on the way to the Shah's palace to get the secret map to Ali Baba's cave, but the Hooded Claw has a few plans of his own. Will the Ant Hill Mob be able to save her before she meets her doom, and will Penelope find the treasure so she can give it to the poor children of Baghdad?
14	"Bad Fortune in a Chinese Fortune Cookie"	December 13, 1969	46-14
Penelope is in Chinatown in San Francisco, California to watch the Chinese New Year Parade. The Hooded Claw captures her in the mouth of a fire-breathing dragon float from the parade. He sends her down a hill towards a warehouse full of fireworks. The Ant Hill Mob follow after Penelope to try and save her. Will they save her in time?
15	"Big Top Trap"	December 20, 1969	46-15
Penelope is performing in a circus. When her life is threatened, the Ant Hill Mob take jobs as clowns so they can act as her bodyguards. The Hooded Claw takes the form of Clyde and throws her from the trapeze to the awaiting Bully Brothers, who whisk her off to the jungle where she is about to be fed to a man-eating plant. Will the Ant Hill Mob be able to find her in time, and get her back to the circus on time? In the end, Sylvester Sneekly reveals to Penelope he is the Hooded Claw, but Penelope refuses to believe that they are one and the same person.
16	"Game of Peril"	January 10, 1970	46-17
Penelope is on a scavenger hunt, with a list of items especially made for her by Sylvester Sneekly. After finding her first item, a unicycle, she gets on and is heading towards a cliff. The Ant Hill Mob arrives just in time to save her. The Hooded Claw sees her rescue and comes up with a plan to do her in.
17	"London Town Treachery"	January 17, 1970	46-16
Penelope is visiting London to deliver a painting to the Earl of Crumpet. The Hooded Claw has a different plan in mind. He grabs Penelope and the painting. Will the Ant Hill Mob be in time to save her? Will they get the painting back and deliver it to the Earl?

== Home media ==
On May 10, 2005, Warner Home Video (via Hanna-Barbera Cartoons and Warner Bros. Family Entertainment) released the complete series on DVD in Region 1 territories. The UK had the full series released on DVD on July 31, 2006 in Region 2 PAL format. The series is also available at the iTunes Store.

DVD name	Episode #	Release date	Additional information
The Perils of Penelope Pitstop: The Complete Series	17	May 10, 2005	Commentary on various episodes; Featurette: The Players in Perils (featurette on the great escapes of Penelope and other characters); Penelope Pitstop's Spin-Outs (retrospective documentary)

== Cultural references ==
- The 1984 song "The Power of Love" by British dance-pop band Frankie Goes to Hollywood makes reference to the show's main villain, the Hooded Claw.
- The characters appear in issue 41 of the crossover comic book series Scooby-Doo! Team-Up, where it provides a conclusion to the series where finally Penelope discovers that her appointed guardian has been the Hooded Claw all along.
- The 2008 series Headcases featured segments parodying The Perils of Penelope Pitstop.
- The Hooded Claw appears in the Wacky Races episode "The Trial of Dick Dastardly" voiced by Tom Kenny impersonating Paul Lynde. He appears as the prosecutor at Dick Dastardly's trial. There is also a reference to the original voice actor Paul Lynde's appearances on the original 1966-1981 version of Hollywood Squares as the Hooded Claw is shown in a middle square. The Hooded Claw was planned to return in season 3 but the series was canceled after the second season.
- The Hooded Claw and the Bully Brothers will appear in Jellystone!.
