= The Jetsons: Invasion of the Planet Pirates =

1994 video game

- North American cover art
- Developer: Sting
- Publishers: JP: Kadokawa Shoten; NA: Taito
- Platform: Super NES
- Release: NA: June 1994; JP: June 9, 1995
- Genre: Platform
- Mode: Single-player

The Jetsons: Invasion of the Planet Pirates is a 1994 platform game developed by Sting and published by Taito. Based on the animated sitcom The Jetsons, it was released for the Super Nintendo Entertainment System in North America.

In 1995, the game was modified and released in Japan as Yōkai Buster: Ruka no Daibōken, based on Kadokawa Shoten's mascot character Ruka.

== Gameplay ==
A boss fight from The Jetsons: Invasion of the Planet Pirates

The same fight, from Yōkai Buster Ruka no Daibōken

Captain Zoom informs George while he was traveling to work that Zora, the leader of the space pirates, is planning on looting the Solar System of all of its resources. George has to go through nine stages of intergalactic action in order to stop the pirates using a special device known as a Pneumo Osmatic Precipitator (P.O.P.). This device allows George to hold on to items and breathe underwater.

There are various boss fights with machinery. With a high enough score, the player goes into a bonus stage where items must be collected before time runs out. Players must also travel through tubes to get from one part of the level to another. A speed chase level is also included in one of the levels of the game.

== Development ==
The Jetsons: Invasion of the Planet Pirates was originally released in North America by Taito. Sting Entertainment developed it, with Hideki Takahagi as the main music composer for the Jetsons game, using Mitsuhito Tanaka's primary sound driver for Sting. This game was considered the very last one that used Mitsuhito Tanaka's primary sound driver for Sting until they were ordered by Square Co. Ltd to get rid of the sound driver and create a brand new one for Treasure Hunter G.

== Reception ==
GamePro gave the game a negative review, summarizing, "if you liked The Jetsons ... then you might be able to wade through this game. Intermediate gamers need not apply much to this one, though. The Jetsons game is basic hop-n-bop, space-style, but it seems like all the other hop-n-boppers out there." Electronic Gaming Monthly rated the game at 6.4/10, praising it as "a faithful cartoon animation, with good graphics and character animations", but criticized the awkwardness of the suction cup attack.

== Yōkai Buster: Ruka no Daibōken ==
In 1995, Kadokawa Shoten created a new mascot character called Yōkai Buster Ruka for the magazine Marukatsu Super Famicom. The company wanted Sting to reprogram and edit The Jetsons: Invasion of the Planet Pirates into a new game called Yōkai Buster: Ruka no Daibōken (妖怪バスター ルカの大冒険; lit. "Phantom Buster: Ruka's Big Adventure") with new music (composed by Mitsuhito Tanaka), new enemies and new areas. Both versions have essentially the same engine with a different story and theme. They also have a strict time limit that punishes tardiness with lost lives.

The player takes control of Ruka, an aggressive demon girl who lives in a world filled with harmful monsters. Much of her past is shrouded in mystery and her age is deliberately hidden in context. She lives a long life but has the mentality of a 13-year-old girl. Compared to the futuristic setting of The Jetsons, the Japanese version uses a contemporary setting with Japanese architecture. Extra features were added into the Japanese version including an extra underwater level, a mini-game, and a training mode.

== See also ==
- The Jetsons: Cogswell's Caper!
- List of Hanna-Barbera-based video games
