= Dastardly and Muttley in Their Flying Machines =

American animated television series

- DVD box set
- Genre: Comedy; Fantasy
- Created by: William Hanna; Joseph Barbera
- Written by: Larz Bourne; Dalton Sandifer; Michael Maltese
- Directed by: William Hanna; Joseph Barbera
- Voices of: Don Messick; Paul Winchell
- Narrated by: Don Messick
- Composer: Ted Nichols
- Country of origin: United States
- No. of episodes: 17

Production
- Producers: William Hanna; Joseph Barbera
- Running time: 22 minutes
- Production company: Hanna-Barbera Productions

Original release
- Network: CBS
- Release: September 13, 1969 – January 3, 1970

Related
- Wacky Races (1968); The Perils of Penelope Pitstop; Fender Bender 500; Wacky Races (2017)

Dastardly and Muttley in Their Flying Machines (or simply Dastardly and Muttley in the UK and Ireland) is an American animated television series produced by Hanna-Barbera Productions, and a spin-off of Wacky Races. The show was originally broadcast as a Saturday morning cartoon, airing from September 13, 1969, to January 3, 1970, on CBS. The show focuses on the efforts of Dick Dastardly and his canine sidekick Muttley to catch Yankee Doodle Pigeon, a carrier pigeon who carries secret messages (hence the name of the show's theme song "Stop the Pigeon"). The title is a reference to the film and song Those Magnificent Men in Their Flying Machines (1965).

The original working title of the show was Stop That Pigeon, a phrase which is repeated in the theme song.

The show had only two voice actors: Paul Winchell as Dick Dastardly, the indistinctly heard General and other characters and Don Messick as Muttley, Klunk, Zilly and other characters. Each 22-minute episode was broadcast over half an hour on the network, including network breaks, and contained: two Dastardly & Muttley stories, one Magnificent Muttley story (Muttley's Walter Mitty-style daydreams), and two or three short Wing Dings (brief gags to break up the longer stories).

== Plot ==
In Germany, Dick Dastardly and Muttley, the villains from Wacky Races, are now flying aces in World War I-styled aeroplanes and members of the Vulture Squadron, on a mission to stop a messenger pigeon named Yankee Doodle Pigeon from delivering top-secret messages to an opposing army. The other members of the Squadron are Klunk, an inventor who speaks an unintelligible language (punctuated by howls, clicks, whistles, and growls, accompanied by bizarre facial contortions), and Zilly, a panicky pilot whose main role is to translate for Klunk, and who tries to desert the mission at any given opportunity.

Each story features variations on the same plot elements: the Vulture Squadron sets out to trap Yankee Doodle Pigeon, a process which begins with Zilly trying to escape and being retrieved by Muttley, and Klunk introducing a plan that involves using one or more planes equipped with his latest contraptions. Inevitably, either the plan is flawed, or one or more of the Squadron messes up and the plane(s) either crash, collide or explode (or all of the above). While they are falling out of the wreckage, Dick Dastardly calls for help, which Muttley offers depending on whether Dastardly either agrees or disagrees to give him medals. Even when Muttley does agree to fly Dastardly out of trouble, Dastardly seldom has a soft landing. At some point the General calls Dastardly on the phone to demand results, and while Dastardly assures him that they will soon capture the pigeon, the General usually disbelieves him and bellows unintelligibly to Dastardly through the phone and extends his hand from it to either grab Dastardly by the nose or his mustache. By the end of every story, Yankee Doodle Pigeon escapes while the Vulture Squadron is often left in backfiring predicaments.

In a contemporary comic book/comic digest series of Dastardly and Muttley in Their Flying Machines, Dastardly and Muttley still failed to stop Yankee Doodle Pigeon, except for three times: the first time when accidentally knocking out and capturing Yankee Doodle Pigeon with falling ice cubes; Dastardly and Muttley finding to their surprise that the pigeon's satchel contained nothing but moths. The second time, they salted his tail for the purpose of again retrieving his satchel, only to discover it contained a jigsaw puzzle that read "Sucker!", while the pigeon had the real message under his helmet. The third time, Dastardly and Muttley lured Yankee Doodle to their side during a 24-hour truce, hypnotized him and set him up to be a traitor.

The show also featured Wing Dings, short clips with jokes, and Magnificent Muttley, where Muttley encounters Walter Mitty-esque daydreams.

=== Magnificent Muttley ===
There was one Magnificent Muttley episode in each of the 17 broadcast episodes. Muttley is the main character and imagines himself in a lot of situations, with Dastardly in the role of the villain; each episode was about three minutes long. Dastardly's car from Wacky Races made a cameo in a few of these shorts, namely "The Marvelous Muttdini" and "Admiral Bird Dog".

== Episodes ==
Episode credits: Story: Larz Bourne; Dalton Sandifer; Mike Maltese. Story direction: Alex Lovy, Bill Perez.

No.	Episodes (episode codes)	Original release date	Prod. code
1	"Fur Out Furlough" (47-4) / "Barn Dance" (47-72) / "Hot Soup" (47-71) / "Muttley on the Bounty" / "Sappy Birthday"	September 13, 1969	DM-1
2	"Follow That Feather" (47-2) / "Barber" (47-70) / "Empty Hangar" (47-73) / "What's New Old Bean?" / "Operation Anvil"	September 20, 1969	DM-2
3	"Sky Hi-IQ" (47-5) / "Prop Wash" (47-74) / "Carpet" (47-76) / "The Marvelous Muttdini" / "A Plain Shortage of Planes"	September 27, 1969	DM-3
4	"Barnstormers" (47-8) / "Arnold" (47-78) / "Pineapple Sundae" (47-79) / "The New Mascot" / "The Bad Actor" / "Shape Up or Ship Out"	October 4, 1969	DM-4
5	"Stop That Pigeon" (47-1) / "Grease Job" (47-75) / "Robot" (47-83) / "The Big Topper" / "Zilly's a Dilly"	October 11, 1969	DM-5
6	"The Cuckoo Patrol" (47-11) / "Automatic Door" (47-82) / "Airmail" (47-84) / "Runway Stripe" / "The Masked Muttley" / "Pest Pilots"	October 18, 1969	DM-6
While disguised as birds to sneak up on Yankee Doodle Pigeon, the Squadron crashes outside the home of a clock maker and his giant cuckoo clock. The Squadron volunteers to be test pilots for a mad scientist's new aircraft. In the Magnificent Muttley episode, Muttley is the Masked Muttley, out to foil bank robber, Snake Poison Dastardly.
7	"The Swiss Yelps" / "Eagle-Beagle" / WD: "Deep Reading"; "Shell Game"; "Slightly Loaded" / MM: Movie Stuntman"	October 25, 1969	DM-7
While pursuing Yankee Doodle Pigeon through the Swiss Alps, the Vulture Squadron keeps annoying a grumpy young mountain climber. Dastardly annoys a bald eagle and its nest. In the Magnificent Muttley episode, Muttley serves as a stunt mutt to director Darryl F. Dastardly.
8	"Fly By Knights" (47-15) / "There's No Fool Like a Re-Fuel" (47-16) / WD: "Springtime" (47-98); "Dog's Life"; "Strange Equipment" / MM: "Coonskin Caper"	November 1, 1969	DM-8
Dastardly decides that the entire team needs to wear glasses, but the ones prescribed make things a lot worse. The Vulture Squadron tries to find ways to refuel to keep chasing after the pigeon and end up destroying the gas station and annoying its grumpy owner. In the Magnificent Muttley episode, Muttley is Daniel Boone who attempts to rescue his girlfriend kidnapped by a Native American Dastardly.
9	"Movies Are Badder Than Ever" (47-18) / "Home Sweet Homing Pigeon" (47-19) / WD: "The Elevator" (47-81); "Obedience School" / MM: "Aquanuts"	November 8, 1969	DM-9
The General hires a movie director to film the Vulture Squadron, but the squad keep ruining the shots. Klunk, Zilly and Muttley's enlistments have run out so they want to leave; Dastardly tries to convince them to stay a few more rounds. In the Magnificent Muttley episode, Muttley has to clean a swimming pool and he imagines going on a treasure dive.
10	"Lens a Hand" (47-17) / "Vacation Trip Trap" (47-20) / WD: "Parachute" (47-99); "Real Snapper" / MM: "Leonardo De Muttley"	November 15, 1969	DM-10
Dastardly tries to assure the general that they are doing their jobs by offering to record their actions on camera, but with Muttley operating the camera, they are unsuccessful. Dastardly's furlough is granted, but he keeps running into the Vulture Squadron everywhere he goes. In the Magnificent Muttley episode, Dastardly tries to steal Leonardo da Muttley's flying inventions.
11	"Stop Which Pigeon?" (47-21) / "Ceiling Zero Zero" (47-22) / WD: "Fast Freight" (47-90); "Home Run" / MM: "Start Your Engines"	November 22, 1969	DM-11
When the general pays a visit to the Vulture Squadron headquarters, Dastardly hires an impostor pigeon to pretend that he caught him, but the real Yankee Doodle Pigeon keeps appearing anyway. The Vulture Squadron try to catch Yankee Doodle Pigeon for the umpteenth time with a bird caller plane; a bird packaging plane; a sandbag balloon; and a weather machine. In Magnificent Muttley, Muttley has to wash his Wacky Races car and dreams he is in an auto race against the cheating Dastardly.
12	"Who's Who?" (47-23) / "Operation Birdbrain" (47-24) / WD: "Bowling Pin" (47-88); "Shrink Job" / MM: "Ship Ahooey"	November 29, 1969	DM-12
After a blow to the head, Dastardly has lost his memory and has no idea what's going on. Dastardly has the Vulture Squadron try to think like the pigeon. While washing dishes, Muttley dreams of a swimming race across the English Channel, but Dastardly tries to sabotage him.
13	"Medal Muddle" (47-25) / "Go South Young Pigeon!" (47-26) / WD: "The Window Washer" (47-128); "Beach Blast" / MM: "Admiral Bird Dog"	December 6, 1969	DM-13
Muttley is upset that his medals have gone missing. The Vulture Squadron try to catch Yankee Doodle Pigeon in the midst of flocks of migrating ducks. Muttley dreams of being the first dog to reach the North Pole.
14	"Too Many Kooks" (47-27) / "Ice See You" (47-28) / WD: "Echo" (47-89); "Rainmaker" / MM:"Professor Muttley"	December 13, 1969	DM-14
The members of the Vulture Squadron take turns inventing pigeon-catching planes. The Vulture Squadron try to catch Yankee Doodle Pigeon in a snow-based environment, which angers the local natives and a polar bear. Dastardly steals Muttley's inventions but does not understand how to use them when he tries to demonstrate it in front of an investor.
15	"Balmy Swami" (47-29) / "Camouflage Hop-Aroo" (47-30) / WD: "Mop Up" (47-124); "Big Turnover" (a.k.a. Left Hanging) / MM: "Wild Mutt Muttley"	December 20, 1969	DM-15
The Vulture Squadron consults a swami who uses a crystal ball to predict the devices they will use to catch the pigeon. The General sends a camouflage expert to have the Vulture Squadron disguise their plane. Muttley dreams he is a Tarzan-like wild mutt who has to rescue his girlfriend who has been captured by poacher Dastardly.
16	"Have Plane Will Travel" (47-31) / "Windy Windmill" (47-32) / WD: "Tough Break" (47-110); "The Ice Cream Tree" / MM: "Astromutt"	December 27, 1969	DM-16
The General transfers the Vulture Squadron to a remote island, but Yankee Doodle Pigeon is in the area, so they make island-based aircraft to chase him down. The Vulture Squadron follow Yankee Doodle Pigeon to Holland. Muttley imagines he is an astronaut exploring a new planet while Dastardly plays an enemy space alien.
17	"Plane Talk" (47-33) / "Happy Bird Day" (47-34) / WD: "Boxing" (47-85); "Runaway Rug" (a.k.a. Magic Carpet) / MM: "Super Muttley"	January 3, 1970	DM-17
Klunk invents some devices that rescue the squad when their planes break and they are going to fall. The General tells Dastardly that there will not be any birthday celebrations until they stop the pigeon. Dastardly prepares a birthday cake for the General and takes it on their missions. Muttley imagines he is a superhero.

== Voice cast ==
- Paul Winchell as Dick Dastardly. Winchell also voices the General as well as an occasional guest character.
- Don Messick as Muttley, Klunk and Zilly. Messick voices the Narrator and practically all of the guest characters.

== Syndication ==
After its original CBS run, Dastardly and Muttley was shown in syndicated reruns on local stations between 1976 and 1982. Some episodes were subsequently distributed on VHS tape by Worldvision Enterprises.

== Home video ==
On May 10, 2005, Warner Home Video released the complete series on Region 1 DVD. On July 31, 2006, the series was released on DVD R2 in the United Kingdom, but only in HMV stores and its online site as an HMV Exclusive.

The complete series was released on Blu-ray on June 30, 2026.

DVD name	Episode #	Release date	Additional information
Dastardly & Muttley in Their Flying Machines: The Complete Series	17	May 10, 2005	Commentary on various episodes; The Vulture Squadron's Greatest Misses - Watch the Pigeon Thwart the Vulture Squadron; Dastardly and Muttley's Spin-Offs (retrospective documentary)

== References in popular culture ==
Psychobilly rock group the Reverend Horton Heat covered the theme song in 1995 as a medley with the theme song from Jonny Quest on the cover album Saturday Morning: Cartoons' Greatest Hits with other various artists.

Hip-hop group Madvillain references the characters in their song "Accordion" off their debut album Madvillainy.

In the BBC Robin Hood episode "Lardner's Ring" (2007), when Robin Hood is trying to send a message to King Richard via pigeon, the Sheriff of Nottingham yells out, "We must catch the pigeon! Catch the pigeon NOW!", saying it the same way as Dastardly.

== Other appearances and renditions ==
Yankee Doodle Pigeon and Klunk appear in the 2021 animated series Jellystone! with Klunk voiced by Fajer Al-Kaisi and Jim Conroy. Yankee Doodle Pigeon made background appearances. Klunk appears in "Lady Danjjer: Is It Wrong to Long for Kabong?" where he steals Jabberjaw's ice cream that she got from Shazzan only to be defeated by El Kabong.

Yankee Doodle Pigeon appears stuffed and mounted in Dick Dastardly's quarters aboard his flying machine in the 2020 animated film Scoob!

Mumbly and Dread Baron, who "bear a strong resemblance" to Muttley and Dick Dastardly, appear in Hanna-Barbera's Laff-A-Lympics in 1978. The character changes came due to licensing issues. Dread Baron is later to be revealed as Dick Dastardly's brother in the Laff-A-Lympics comic books.

== See also ==
- Dick Dastardly
- Muttley
- Saturday Morning: Cartoons' Greatest Hits
- Yogi's Treasure Hunt
- Scoob!
- List of works produced by Hanna-Barbera Productions
- List of Hanna-Barbera characters
- United States Army Pigeon Service
