= Penelope Pitstop =

American animated television character

- Wacky Races character
- First appearance: "See-Saw To Arkansas" (1968)
- Created by: Iwao Takamoto; Jerry Eisenberg; Joseph Barbera
- Voiced by: Janet Waldo (1968–2016); Marilyn Schreffler (1987); Karyra Nicole Arias (1999); Kath Soucie (2006–2018); Nicole Parker (2017–2019)

In-universe information
- Nickname: Pretty Penny
- Species: Human
- Gender: Female
- Occupation: Racer
- Family: Petunia Pitstop (mother, 2017 series); Pandora Pitstop (twin sister, 2017 series); Johnny Pitstop (brother, early production concept of The Perils of Penelope Pitstop.)
- Spouses: Peter Perfect (husband, Wacky Races Forever)
- Children: Parker Perfect (son, Wacky Races Forever); Piper Perfect (daughter, Wacky Races Forever)

Penelope Pitstop is a fictional character who appeared in the 1968 Hanna-Barbera animated series Wacky Races and the spin-off The Perils of Penelope Pitstop, and was voiced by Janet Waldo. She also appeared in the 2017 series of Wacky Races.

== Background ==
Penelope "Penny" Pitstop is a southern belle, and the only female racer in the original Wacky Races lineup, driving a pink car known as The Compact Pussycat which has personal grooming facilities with several gadgets or stored beauty products that sometimes backfire on other racers. She always has time to relax and worry about her looks, because her car is a mobile beauty parlor. Penelope Pitstop also has a habit of holding her arm out in the breeze to dry newly applied nail polish, which the others racers mistake for a turn signal. Two such instances are depicted in the 1968 series, first at the beginning of "Beat the Clock to Yellow Rock" when Penelope is at the front and inadvertently slows down the entire pack of races for seventeen miles, and again in "Speeding for Smogland" which sends the Ant Hill Mob and their race car, The Bulletproof Bomb, crashing into a cactus.

Peter Perfect had a crush on her, a feeling that was returned, and always tried to help her; in "Dash to Delaware", they almost end up married. In the 2006 animated short, Wacky Races Forever, it is revealed that she had two children with Peter Perfect.

Unlike other drivers, Penelope rarely was targeted by the other racers (except Dick Dastardly of course), as it seems they also liked and tried to help her as Peter did. Penny was always thankful for their assistance and was perhaps the most peaceful racer on the track, though she twice gave the Creepy Coupe's dragon and serpent a good bashing with her umbrella. In the 2017 version, she eventually shows martial arts skills.

Penelope also had her own cartoon series, The Perils of Penelope Pitstop, which also featured her rescuers the Ant Hill Mob. Her sworn enemy is the Hooded Claw (who is the secret identity of her own guardian, Sylvester Sneekly). Although she is blind to the fact her guardian is her nemesis in disguise, she is very smart and often manages to get herself out of trouble before her true guardians the Ant Hill Mob can get to her.

== Appearance ==
In Wacky Races, Penelope has long blonde hair with a full fringe, tied back into a ponytail with a hot pink scrunchie. She is 23 years old. She wears a purple racer helmet with goggles. She also wears a dark pink rider jacket with a purple turtleneck and purple job gloves, a pink skirt with red pants underneath and white boots.

In The Perils of Penelope Pitstop, Penelope's eyes resemble those of Daphne Blake, and she wears red lipstick. She wears a slight alteration to her Wacky Races wardrobe. Her helmet is replaced by a magenta pilot helmet with matching white goggles. She wears a hot pink long-sleeved jacket with a matching belt and long magenta scarf, which is hanging loose on the right side. Even though she still wears her red pants and white boots from Wacky Races, her job gloves are now white.

In the 2017 reboot and sequel to the original Wacky Races series, she also has an evil twin sister named Pandora Pitstop.

== See also ==
- List of Hanna-Barbera characters
- List of works produced by Hanna-Barbera Productions
- Roger Ramjet
- Tom Slick
