= Wacky Races: Crash and Dash =

2008 video game

- Developer: Eidos Studios, Sweden AB
- Publisher: Eidos Interactive
- Platforms: Nintendo DS, Wii
- Release: NA: June 17, 2008; AU: June 20, 2008 (DS); EU: June 27, 2008
- Genre: Racing
- Modes: Single-player, multiplayer

Wacky Races: Crash and Dash is a 2008 racing video game based on the animated television series Wacky Races.

== Gameplay ==
The game consists of three modes: Crazy Circuit, Wacky Race, and Trap Challenge. Crazy Circuit mode consists of completing six sets of races with four tracks each, Wacky Race allows a track unlocked in Crazy Circuit mode to be raced through, and Trap Challenge consists of playing through the traps set by Dastardly and Muttley during the races.

All racers from the cartoon are playable except Dastardly and Muttley, who aim to set traps during the race to slow the other racers down. Each vehicle is given four powerups to use to gain an advantage in the race, which are earned by collecting Mad Dash cogs. These are earned by finding them during the race or successfully completing the traps. At the end of the race, all vehicles sprint to the finish; those with the most Mad Dash cogs gain more speed.

== Reception ==
Reception

Aggregate score
| Aggregator | Score | |
| Aggregator | DS | Wii |
|---|---|---|
| Metacritic | 41/100 | 39/100 |

Review scores
| Publication | Score | |
| Publication | DS | Wii |
|---|---|---|
| Eurogamer | 3/10 | N/A |
| GamePro | N/A | 1/5 |
| GamesMaster | N/A | 47% |
| GameSpot | 3/10 | 3/10 |
| GamesRadar+ | 1.5/5 | N/A |
| GameZone | 3.8/10 | 5/10 |
| IGN | 4.2/10 | 4/10 |
| NGamer | 63% | 35% |
| Official Nintendo Magazine | N/A | 40% |

The game received "generally unfavorable reviews" on both platforms according to the review aggregation website Metacritic.
