= Wacky Races (1968 TV series) =

American animated television series

- Genre: Comedy; Sports
- Written by: Larz Bourne; Dalton Sandifer; Tom Dagenais; Michael Maltese
- Directed by: William Hanna; Joseph Barbera
- Voices of: Daws Butler; Don Messick; John Stephenson; Janet Waldo; Paul Winchell
- Narrated by: Dave Willock
- Composer: Hoyt Curtin
- Country of origin: United States
- Original language: English
- No. of seasons: 1
- No. of episodes: 17 (34 segments)

Production
- Producers: William Hanna; Joseph Barbera
- Editors: Richard Allen; Milton Krear
- Running time: 21 minutes (two 10-11 min segments)
- Production companies: Hanna-Barbera Productions; Heatter-Quigley Productions

Original release
- Network: CBS
- Release: September 14, 1968 – January 4, 1969

Related
- Dastardly and Muttley in Their Flying Machines; The Perils of Penelope Pitstop; Fender Bender 500; Wacky Races (2017)

Wacky Races is an American animated comedy television series produced by Hanna-Barbera Productions in association with Heatter-Quigley Productions. It aired on CBS as part of its Saturday-morning schedule from September 14, 1968, to January 4, 1969, and then reruns the next season. The series features 11 different cars racing against each other in various road rallies throughout North America, with all of the drivers hoping to win the title of the "World's Wackiest Racer". The show was inspired by the 1965 comedy film The Great Race. This was the only non-game show produced by Heatter-Quigley; the show was intended as a game show in which children would guess the winner of each race, and those who answered correctly would win prizes, but CBS dropped these elements during development.

The cartoon had many regular characters, with 23 people and animals on the 11 race cars. After its network run on CBS, Wacky Races ran in syndication from 1976 to 1982. Seventeen 20-minute episodes were produced, with each of them featuring two 10-minute segments.

The series spawned numerous spin-offs featuring Dick Dastardly through the years, the most similar in theme being Fender Bender 500 in 1990.

In 2017, the series was remade as a reboot first released on Boomerang's video on demand service. It subsequently aired on Cartoon Network in 2018.

== Plot ==
The cartoon revolves around several racers with various themes who are each allowed to use strange gimmicks to compete against other racers in many races across North America as the race announcer (voiced by Dave Willock) talks about the race while interacting with the racers. The racers consist of:

1. The Slag Brothers, Rock and Gravel (vocal effects provided by Daws Butler and Don Messick), two cavemen that drive the Boulder Mobile (1); their car is made out of rock and the brothers (who talk in caveman-like gibberish but with occasional intelligible words) power it up by hitting it on both sides with their clubs and are also able to re-build it from bare rock, always using their clubs. Rock and Gravel have long body hair that covers their body except for their noses, arms, and legs.
2. The Gruesome Twosome, Tiny "Big Gruesome" (voiced by Daws Butler) and Bela "Little Gruesome" (voiced by Don Messick), who are monsters that drive the Creepy Coupe (2); their horror-themed car includes a small bell tower inhabited by a fire-breathing dragon, bats, ghosts, and other creatures. The Creepy Coupe's special booster is "dragon power", with the dragon acting as a RATO unit.
3. Professor Pat Pending (voiced by Don Messick), an inventor who drives the Convert-a-Car (3); he can transform his car into pretty much anything that moves.
4. The Red Max (voiced by Daws Butler), a Manfred von Richthofen–styled aviator who speaks with a German accent that drives car/airplane hybrid called the Crimson Haybaler (4); his vehicle is able to fly, although only for short distances in ground effect. His name is a portmanteau of Red Baron and Blue Max.
5. Penelope Pitstop (voiced by Janet Waldo), the lone female driver, in a 1930s racing costume that drives the Compact Pussycat (5); a Southern belle, Penelope seems more concerned with her looks than with racing and often gets herself into trouble. Nevertheless, she is a skilled racer.
6. Sergeant Blast (voiced by Daws Butler) and Private Meekly (voiced by Paul Winchell), two soldiers in an armored car/tank hybrid called the Army Surplus Special (6); the Sergeant uses "fire power" (i.e. shooting cannonballs from his turret) to temporarily boost power in the car.
7. The Ant Hill Mob, a group of seven dwarf gangsters that is composed of Clyde (the gang leader who is voiced by Paul Winchell), Ring-A-Ding (voiced by Don Messick), Rug Bug Benny, Mac, Danny, Kirby and Willy, in the Bulletproof Bomb (7); they are sometimes preoccupied with getting caught by the police and are able to use "getaway power", which involves all the gangsters (except for Clyde) extending their legs through the bottom of the car and running.
8. Lazy Luke (voiced by John Stephenson), a barefoot hillbilly, and Blubber Bear (vocal effects also provided by Stephenson), a timid, cry-baby brown bear, in the Arkansas Chuggabug (8); Luke maneuvers the steering wheel with his feet and his car is steam-powered from an old rickety boiler. Blubber has been known to blow up a balloon and use it as an air jet for briefly increased speed.
9. Peter Perfect (voiced by Daws Butler), a gentlemanly racer in the Turbo Terrific (9); Peter is strong, handsome and hyper-masculine, but also very vain, and he often boasts about the virtues of his high-tech race car – which regularly falls to pieces seconds after he praises it. He is fond of Penelope and often helps her out.
10. Rufus Ruffcut (voiced by Daws Butler), a lumberjack and his beaver companion Sawtooth (vocal effects provided by Don Messick) in the Buzz Wagon (10); their car, entirely made of wood, features four circular saw blades as wheels and Sawtooth is able to cut through obstacles (such as trees and other objects) at super-high speed.
11. Dick Dastardly (voiced by Paul Winchell), an archetypal mustache-twirling villain and his wheezily snickering dog Muttley (voiced by Don Messick) in the Mean Machine (00); their sinister vehicle is a purple, rocket-powered car with an abundance of concealed weapons and the ability to fly. Dastardly's usual race strategy revolves around using the Mean Machine's great speed to get ahead of the other racers and then setting a trap to stop them and maintain the lead, but most of his plans backfire, causing him to fall back into last place. In the opening title sequence, Dastardly attempts to stall the racers by chaining their cars to a pole, but then he accidentally shifts his car into reverse, bumps into and breaks the pole and frees the others as the race begins.

== Voice cast ==
- Daws Butler as Rock Slag, Big Gruesome, Red Max, Sergeant Blast, Peter Perfect, Rufus Ruffcut, Various
- Don Messick as Muttley, Professor Pat Pending, Gravel Slag, Little Gruesome, Ring-a-Ding, Sawtooth, Various
- John Stephenson as Lazy Luke, Blubber Bear, Various
- Janet Waldo as Penelope Pitstop, Various
- Dave Willock as the Narrator
- Paul Winchell as Dick Dastardly, Clyde, Private Meekly, Various

== Episodes ==
No.	Title	Original release date	Prod. code
1a	"See-Saw to Arkansas"	September 14, 1968	35–1
The Wacky Racers undertake a grueling zig-zag race to Mustard Spread, Arkansas. Also, the Ant Hill Mob escapes a pursuing police officer by donning disguises as the Seven Dwarfs.
1b	"Creepy Trip to Lemon Twist"	September 14, 1968	35–2
The Wacky Racers encounter ghosts in the abandoned town of Spookane on the way to Lemon Twist, Nevada.
2a	"Why Oh Why Wyoming"	September 21, 1968	35–3
The Wacky Racers roar across the desert, dashing toward Rock Springs, Wyoming. Meanwhile, Dick Dastardly teams up with Indian chief Crazy Buffalo in an attempt to stop the racers in their tracks.
2b	"Beat the Clock to Yellow Rock"	September 21, 1968	35–4
At Yellow Rock Park whilst racing toward Well Digger, Wyoming, Dastardly attempts to disguise the Old Faithful geyser as part of the road, and later tries to ensure that Lazy Luke and Blubber Bear do not leave the park together after discovering that the park's bears keep trying to escape.
3a	"Mish Mash Missouri Dash"	September 28, 1968	35–6
Dastardly discovers an irate hillbilly determined to protect his land from trespassers—including the Wacky Racers!
3b	"Idaho a Go Go"	September 28, 1968	35–5
The racers embark on a lap to a little town in Idaho, while Dastardly tries to entrap Penelope Pitstop with a "Little Red Riding Hood" ploy.
4a	"The Baja-Ha-Ha Race"	October 5, 1968	35–11
In Mexico, Dick Dastardly and Muttley try to slow the other drivers by using a herd of cow-shaped balloons to block the road and later try to keep them stuck in a mudhole.
4b	"Real Gone Ape"	October 5, 1968	35–8
Dick Dastardly hypnotizes a giant gorilla in an attempt to win the race.
5a	"Scout Scatter"	October 12, 1968	35–7
The Ant Hill Mob escapes the police by posing as Wood Scouts.
5b	"Free Wheeling to Wheeling"	October 12, 1968	35–10
Dick Dastardly makes use of heavy machinery to stop the Wacky Racers.
6a	"By Rollercoaster to Upsan Downs"	October 19, 1968	35–9
The Wacky Racers travel by roller coaster when Dick Dastardly diverts them into a closed amusement park.
6b	"The Speedy Arkansas Traveller"	October 19, 1968	35–12
Racing to Noah's, Arkansas, Dastardly and Muttley hilariously pose as army officers to harass the Army Surplus Special, but find themselves scrambling from actual army officers!
7a	"The Zippy Mississippi Race"	October 26, 1968	35–15
Dastardly diverts the rest of the racers onto a Mississippi riverboat. He then tricks a Southern colonel into thinking the other racers are Yankee trespassers.
7b	"Traffic Jambalaya"	October 26, 1968	35–17
From Ankle Ache, Alabama, to Shin Splint, Louisiana. Dastardly uses more tricks to slow down the other racers including switching road signs and laying down a bouncy road. He also sends several racers into searching for a "harmless" gorilla, who is actually Dastardly in disguise, at a wild animal park.
8a	"Hot Race at Chillicothe"	November 2, 1968	35–16
On the way to Chillicothe, Ohio, Dastardly steals a police car and chases the Ant Hill Mob into a baseball park. Then in order to evade the police officer, they play a game in the Itty-Bitty League. Some of the other racers join in.
8b	"The Wrong Lumber Race"	November 2, 1968	35–18
From Sawdust, Saskatchewan, to Short Stump, Oregon, in the rugged lumber country, Dick Dastardly tries to use falling trees and spinning saw blades to stop the racers.
9a	"Rhode Island Road Race"	November 9, 1968	35–19
On the way to Rocky Road, Rhode Island, they go into a big city. Dastardly diverts the Boulder Mobile and the others onto a construction site and they end up in the girders of an unfinished skyscraper.
9b	"The Great Cold Rush Race"	November 9, 1968	35–13
From Frostbite, British Columbia to Cold Cuts, Quebec, on a trans-Canadian race, Dastardly disguises himself as an Abominable Snowman.
10a	"Wacky Race to Ripsaw"	November 16, 1968	35–20
From Elbow Grease, Ohio, to Ripsaw, Arkansas. To prevent Penelope from coming in first place, Dastardly creates a roadside beauty parlor to lure her into stopping and later literally jacks up the Army Surplus Special after diverting them into a garage.
10b	"Oils Well That Ends Well"	November 16, 1968	35–21
From Oil Can, Oklahoma, to Grease Gun, Texas. The Wacky Racers are once again beset by Dick Dastardly's deviously dirty tricks as they race across oil drilling country.
11a	"Whizzin' to Washington"	November 23, 1968	35–22
On the way to Tubba, Washington. When the Ant Hill Mob zooms past Dick Dastardly, he directs a police officer to chase them, whereupon the Mob disguise themselves as trapeze artists.
11b	"The Dipsy Doodle Desert Derby"	November 23, 1968	35–24
From downtown Death Valley to uptown Dune Town, the Wacky Racers make their way across the desert country. Dick Dastardly finds a genie in a bottle and tries to use his powers to win the race.
12a	"Eeny, Miny Missouri Go!"	November 30, 1968	35–14
The racers head to Eeny, Miny, Missouri. Dick Dastardly plots to have an aquarium whale swallow the rest of the contestants!
12b	"The Super Silly Swamp Sprint"	November 30, 1968	35–23
From Sappysota Springs to Squishy Squash City. Dastardly and Muttley unleash a squadron of mechanical mosquitoes to wreak havoc on the other cars and want to win. Only they would dare to ride across aligator territory on an inflatable raft. Dastardly later dresses as an alligator.
13a	"The Dopey Dakota Derby"	December 7, 1968	35–27
Speeding from Cactus City to Gopher Gulch in the Badlands, Dick Dastardly disguises himself as "Deadweed Dick", an outlaw that he sees on a Wanted poster that looks much like him.
13b	"Dash to Delaware"	December 7, 1968	35–26
Speeding to Wott-Will, Delaware, Dick Dastardly sprays cake icing on the road, sending Penelope Pitstop and Peter Perfect into a bakery, where he turns them into wedding cake toppers.
14a	"Speeding for Smogland"	December 14, 1968	35–28
During the race, Dick Dastardly lures the other racers toward a castle façade for a King Arthur movie, hoping to drop the portcullis on one of them.
14b	"Race Rally to Raleigh"	December 14, 1968	35–25
Dick Dastardly lures the other racers onto a farm, where chaos ensues.
15a	"Ballpoint, Penn. or Bust!"	December 21, 1968	35–30
Speeding toward Ballpoint, Pennsylvania, Dick Dastardly sets up a fake train crossing, but the train comes out of the screen and runs over him.
15b	"Fast Track to Hackensack"	December 21, 1968	35–29
Speeding to Hackensack, New Jersey, Dick Dastardly changes a speed limit sign so The Ant Hill Mob are arrested by the sheriff of a town called Law and Order for speeding.
16a	"The Ski Resort Road Race"	December 28, 1968	35–33
Speeding from Mush-Mush, Michigan, to Iceandsnow, Idaho, Dick Dastardly causes an avalanche. He uses a ski jump for his own getaway, but the other cars follow him.
16b	"Overseas Hi-Way Race"	December 28, 1968	35–34
Speeding across a series of bridges from Key Largo to Key West, Florida, Dick Dastardly tries to blow the other racers off course by using a giant wind machine to create an artificial hurricane.
17a	"Race to Racine"	January 4, 1969	35–31
Speeding to Racine, Wisconsin, Dick Dastardly uses various tactics such as blinding Penelope Pitstop with a camera flash and using a large mechanical eggbeater to turn the Army Surplus Special the wrong way.
17b	"The Carlsbad or Bust Bash"	January 4, 1969	35–32
Dick Dastardly digs a pit to trap some drivers, Penelope Pitstop powders her nose and blinds Red Max, and the Turbo Terrific speeds into first place. Dastardly tries to overheat The Arkansas Chug-a-Bug, but it just propels itself into first place from the extra steam. Dastardly has Muttley place a fake "Bridge Out" sign to stop the racers, but Dastardly discovers too late that the bridge really is out. At Carlsbad Caverns, Dastardly attacks them with a caveman and a boulder, but Professor Pat Pending cues it back at him as the other racers make it out.

== Race results ==
The show gave the results of each race at the end of each episode (the first, second, and third placings are given by the narrator, and the narrative sometimes saw some or all of the other cars cross the finish line) as well as what happened with Dick Dastardly after his last scheme's failure. The show never indicated a particular scoring system or way to determine who won the Wacky Races as a whole. The cumulative totals for first-, second-, and third-place finishes for each contestant are presented below:

Contestants	Car name	Car no.	1st	2nd	3rd	Top 3
The Slag Brothers	The Boulder Mobile	1	3	8	3	14
Rufus Ruffcut and Sawtooth	The Buzzwagon	10	3	6	4	13
The Gruesome Twosome	The Creepy Coupe	2	3	3	6	12
The Ant Hill Mob	The Bulletproof Bomb	7	4	5	2	11
Penelope Pitstop	The Compact Pussycat	5	4	2	5	11
The Red Max	The Crimson Haybaler	4	3	4	3	10
Professor Pat Pending	The Convert-A-Car	3	3	2	5	10
Lazy Luke and Blubber Bear	The Arkansas Chuggabug	8	4	1	4	9
Peter Perfect	The Turbo Terrific	9	4	2	2	8
Sergeant Blast and Private Meekly	The Army Surplus Special	6	3	1	0	4
Dick Dastardly and Muttley	The Mean Machine	00	0	0	0	0

=== Standings ===
		1. The Boulder Mobile	2. The Creepy Coupe	3. The Convert-A-Car	4. The Crimson Haybaler	5. The Compact Pussycat	6. The Army Surplus Special	7. The Bulletproof Bomb	8. The Arkansas Chuggabug	9. The Turbo Terrific	10. The Buzzwagon	00. The Mean Machine
1a	See-Saw to Arkansas		2nd		1st						3rd	4th
1b	Creepy Trip to Lemon Twist		2nd			1st					3rd	DQ
2a	Why Oh Why Wyoming	2nd	1st	8th	7th	6th	5th	10th	3rd	9th	4th	11th
2b	Beat the Clock to Yellow Rock	5th	3rd	7th	10th	9th	6th	4th	1st	8th	2nd	
3a	Mish-Mash Missouri Bash		3rd	1st	4th	2nd						
3b	Idaho a Go-Go	1st		3rd							2nd	
4a	The Baja-Ha-Ha Race	1st	5th	4th	3rd	7th	6th	2nd	9th	8th	10th	11th
4b	Real Gone Ape	9th	5th	7th	2nd	6th	1st	4th	10th	8th	3rd	
5a	Scout Scatter	2nd	4th	3rd						5th	1st	
5b	Free Wheeling to Wheeling	5th	4th		6th	3rd	7th	1st		2nd		
6a	By Rollercoaster to Upsan Downs	2nd			1st				3rd			
6b	The Speedy Arkansas Traveler	1st				4th		2nd		3rd		
7a	The Zippy Mississippi Race	7th	6th	5th	8th	3rd	10th	2nd	9th	1st	4th	
7b	Traffic Jambalaya		3rd			1st				2nd		
8a	Hot Race at Chillicothe	3rd				2nd	1st					
8b	The Wrong Lumber Race	9th	3rd	6th	8th	7th	4th	2nd	10th	5th	1st	
9a	Rhode Island Road Race	2nd	1st						3rd			
9b	The Great Cold Rush Race	4th	5th		1st		7th	3rd	2nd	6th	8th	11th
10a	Wacky Race to Ripsaw	3rd			2nd						1st	
10b	Oils Well That Ends Well	10th	6th	1st	4th	5th	2nd	9th	7th	8th	3rd	11th
11a	Whizzin' to Washington	7th	5th	2nd		6th	4th		3rd	1st		
11b	The Dipsy Doodle Desert Derby	4th	3rd				5th			1st	2nd	
12a	Eeny, Miny Missouri Go!	5th		1st		3rd		2nd			4th	
12b	The Super Silly Swamp Sprint	5th			4th	3rd			1st	6th	2nd	
13a	The Dopey Dakota Derby	9th	8th	2nd	3rd	4th	6th	1st	5th	7th	10th	
13b	Dash to Delaware			3rd					1st		2nd	
14a	Speeding for Smogland		2nd		3rd				1st		4th	
14b	Race Rally to Raleigh	2nd	4th	5th				1st		3rd		
15a	Ballpoint, Penn. or Bust!	4th	9th	10th	2nd	1st	8th	3rd	7th	5th	6th	
15b	Fast Track to Hackensack	2nd	3rd					1st				
16a	The Ski Resort Road Race	8th	9th	3rd	5th	7th	1st	10th	6th	4th	2nd	
16b	Overseas Hi-Way Race	2nd	8th	6th	5th	3rd	9th	4th	10th	1st	7th	
17a	Race to Racine	2nd	1st	3rd	10th	4th	6th	9th	7th	5th	8th	
17b	The Carlsbad or Bust Bash	3rd		6th	2nd	1st	4th		5th			

== Spin-offs and similar series ==
In 1969, Dick Dastardly and Muttley were given a spin-off series, titled Dastardly and Muttley in Their Flying Machines. The series is sometimes mistakenly known as Stop the Pigeon, after the show's working title and theme song. In the same year, Penelope Pitstop and the Ant Hill Mob were spun off into another animated series, titled The Perils of Penelope Pitstop. Both series ran for a season each.

Gold Key Comics published a seven-issue comic book series based on Wacky Races from August 1969 to April 1972.

In 1977, Captain Caveman and the Teen Angels debuted. The titular Captain Caveman was modeled after the Slag Brothers.

In 1990, a cartoon segment in Wake, Rattle and Roll named Fender Bender 500 was produced. The show followed the same premise as Wacky Races, but had racers drive monster trucks and races took place on various parts of the world. Only Dick Dastardly and Muttley returned from among the original Wacky Races cast; all other racers were from other Hanna-Barbera shows such as Yogi Bear and Augie Doggie and Doggie Daddy. Unlike in Wacky Races, here Dastardly and Muttley were able to actually win some of the races, though they still had the fewest number of race wins out of all racers.

In 2006, the animated short for a spin-off series titled Wacky Races Forever was produced for Cartoon Network. The series depicted a roster of both new and returning racers competing against each other. Penelope Pitstop and Peter Perfect had married and created Perfect Industries, the corporate sponsor of the new Wacky Races, whereas their children Parker and Piper competed in the race. Other characters included the Slag Brothers, Professor Pat Pending (depicted here with a mad scientist personality), a teenage version of the Gruesome Twosome, and Dick Dastardly and Muttley (working for a new villain named Mr. Viceroy, who sought to steal Perfect Industries). The series was not picked up by Cartoon Network.

In 2016, DC Comics launched a comic series called Wacky Raceland. It was a dark and gritty reimagining of the series set after the Apocalypse in a similar vein to the Mad Max franchise. The comic ran for six issues from May to December 2016.

In 2017, Wacky Races— a reboot and sequel also produced by Hanna-Barbera (in-name-only)—was released on Boomerang's SVOD service in 2017. It also aired on the Boomerang channels around the world starting later in the year.

On June 15, 2022, it was announced a stop-motion Wacky Races series produced by Hanna-Barbera Studios Europe was in production and would have aired on Cartoon Network. The project was later cancelled with only a short pilot being completed.

In 2024, a supposed plot intro of a Japanese anime intro made by AC-bu with music from Pasocom Music Club and chelmico, later was found that a series of shorts called Wacky Races: Japan Tour was under production.

In 2025, Dynamite Entertainment published a Wacky Races comic titled Giant Size Wacky Races in April 2025.

== Films ==
=== Hanna-Barbera cinematic universe ===
==== Scoob! (2020) ====
Dick Dastardly (voiced by Jason Isaacs) and Muttley (voiced by Billy West and archived laugh recordings by Don Messick) made an appearance as the main villains in the animated Scooby-Doo feature film, Scoob!, released on May 15, 2020. Rock and Gravel Slag made cameo appearances during the prehistoric gladiator scene. Various drawings of the Wacky Racers cameo on Dick Dastardly's prison cell on the wall during the credits. Penelope Pitstop was also to appear physically as a main character interacting with Scooby and Shaggy according to concept art, but she instead makes a brief cameo on a video game cabinet themed around her.

In 2018, an animated film based on Wacky Races was reported to be in development by Warner Animation Group.

== Video games ==
The main plot of Wacky Races, in which characters racing on unusual fictional vehicles and using various over-the-top "weapons" to hinder their opponents, would later go on to inspire the kart racing video game genre in the 1990s. Wacky Races eventually has its own video game series since 1991, preceding Nintendo's Super Mario Kart, which was considered as the foremost game of this kind. Various video games based on the series have been produced.

- Wacky Races (1991)
- Chiki Chiki Machine Mō Race (3DO)
- Chiki Chiki Machine Mō Race 2: In Space (3DO)
- Wacky Races (2000)
- Wacky Races: Starring Dastardly and Muttley
- Wacky Races: Mad Motors
- Wacky Races: Crash and Dash

In 1993, Sega released a medal game based on the series, exclusively in Japan. It was a racing game, but the outcome of the race depended entirely on luck. The PS2 game Wacky Races: Starring Dastardly and Muttley is notable for allowing players to have Dick Dastardly finally win a race. The narrator is taken aback or disgusted and Dastardly is happy and surprised at winning a race. In 2007, Heiwa released a pachinko game titled Kenken Aloha de Hawaii. Later in 2007, another game called Wacky Races: Mad Motors for the PlayStation 2 was released by Blast Entertainment on June 12. A new video game for the Wii and Nintendo DS consoles titled Wacky Races: Crash and Dash was released on June 27, 2008. This game was developed by Eidos. In 2009, another arcade game was released by Banpresto, which was a more traditional racing game. It ran on the Taito Type X2, and was released internationally by Gamewax.

== Home video ==
A three-disc DVD release of the complete series was released in Japan on August 10, 2001, with both English and Japanese audio tracks. In the United Kingdom, Warner Home Video released a three-disc set with no extra features, which was exclusive to Virgin Megastores. The complete box set of Wacky Races was released on July 31, 2006 as a HMV exclusive, but is essentially the standard Volumes 1–3 with no extras. The Australian release of Volumes 1 and 2 was made available in 200, while Volume 3 was released in 2007.

A two-and-a-half-hour VHS video was released in 1996.

All 34 episodes can be purchased on the iTunes Store.

DVD name	Episode #	Release date	Additional information
Wacky Races: The Complete Series	34	October 19, 2004	Commentary on various episodes; Rearview Mirror: A Look Back at Wacky Races (retrospective documentary); Spin-Out Spin-Offs (featurette on the spin-off shows Dastardly and Muttley in Their Flying Machines and The Perils of Penelope Pitstop); Wacky Facts Trivia Track (pop-up trivia over episodes See-Saw to Arkansas and Creepy Trip to Lemon Twist)
Wacky Races: The Complete Series	34	February 14, 2017	Warner Archive Manufacture-on-Demand (MOD) release
Wacky Races: The Complete Series	34	April 29, 2025	Warner Archive Blu-ray release

== The cars and characters in other media ==
Life-size working replicas of the vehicles have been built in the United Kingdom (where the show was very popular) and appear annually at the Goodwood Festival of Speed, with new additions each year. 2008 saw the last of the cars (the Ant Hill Mob in the Bulletproof Bomb #7) added to the collection, making a complete set.

Goodwood Festival of Speed Wacky Races replicas

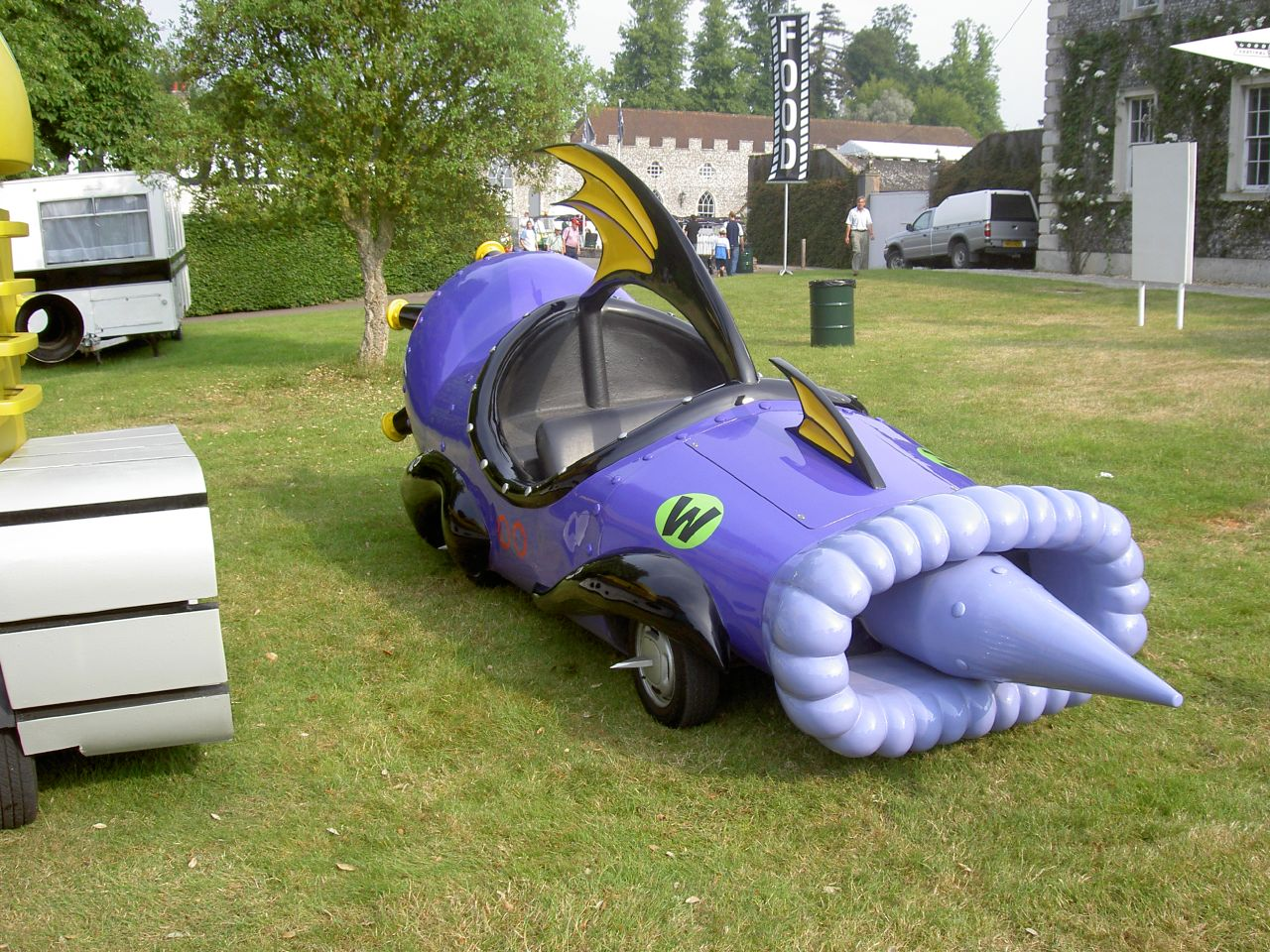
Mean Machine #00

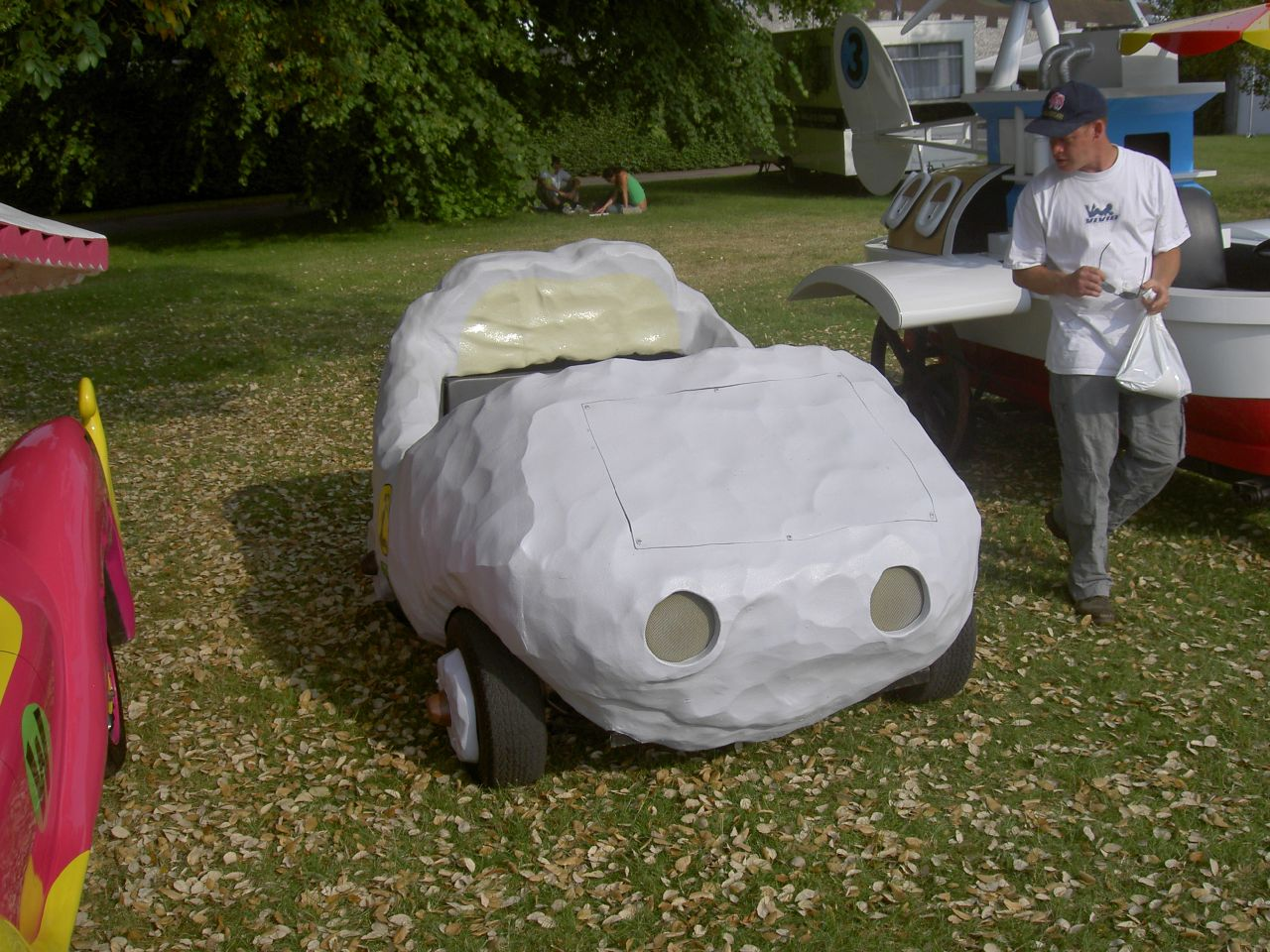
Boulder Mobile #1

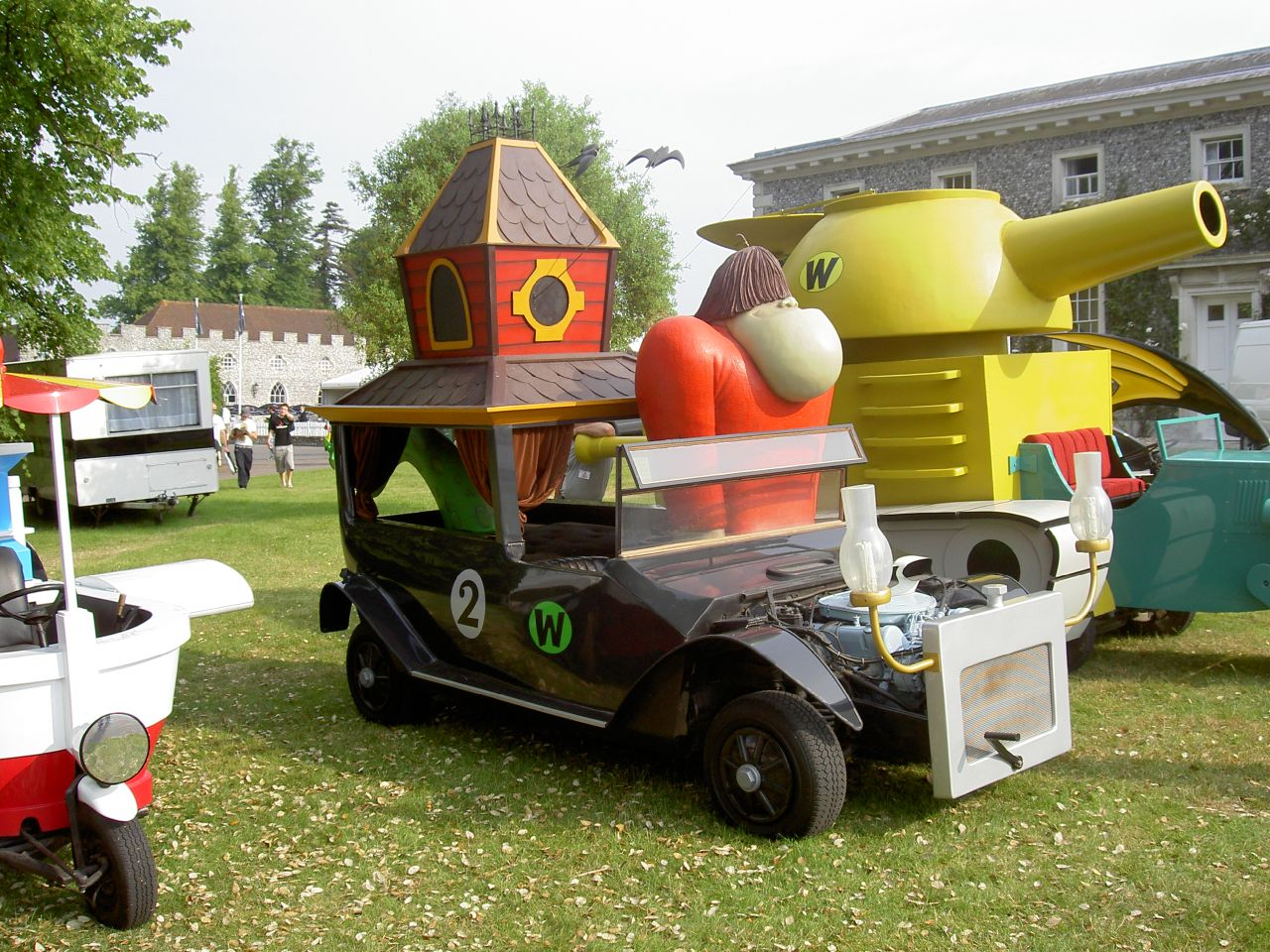
Creepy Coupe #2

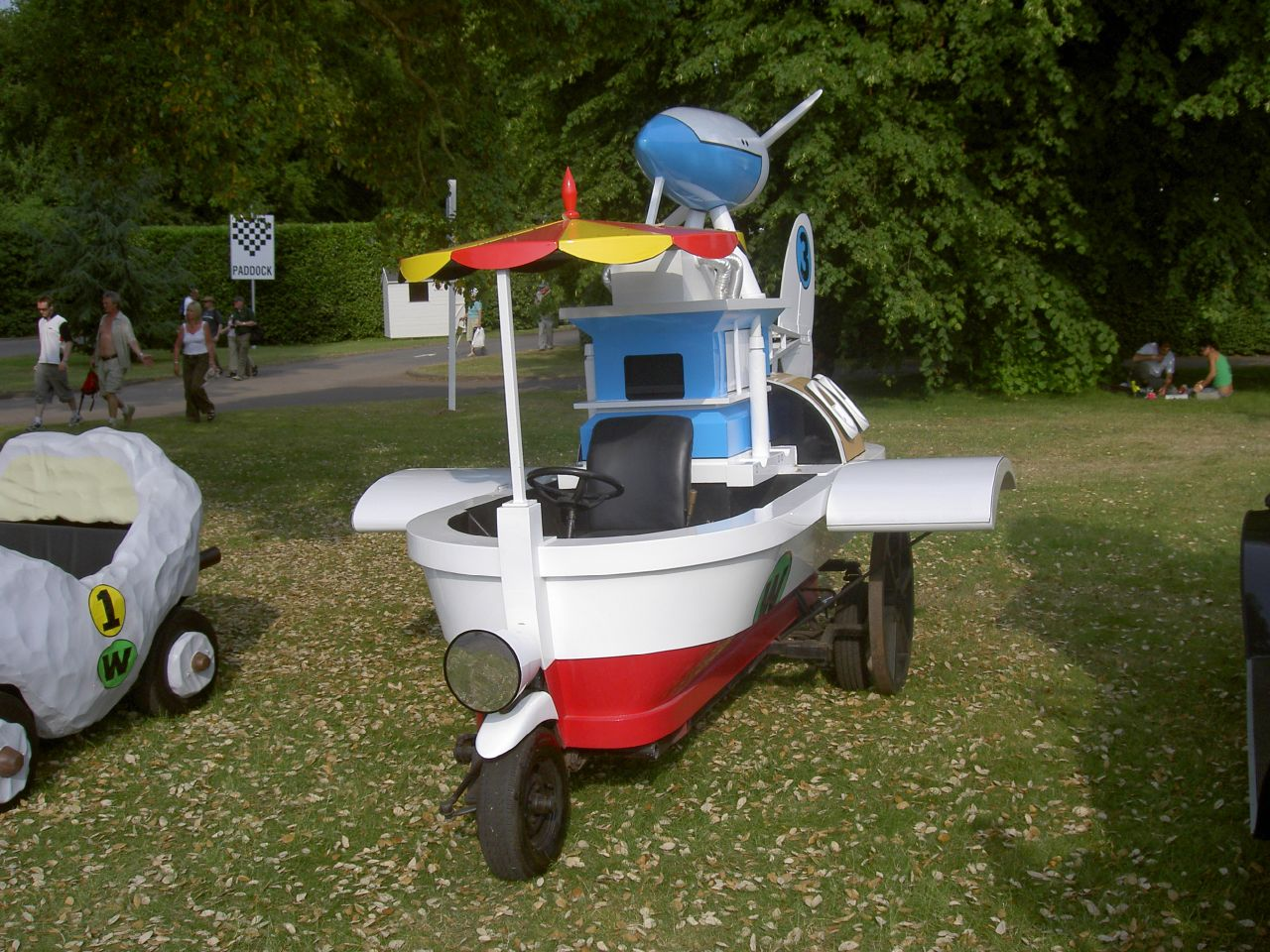
Convert-a-Car #3

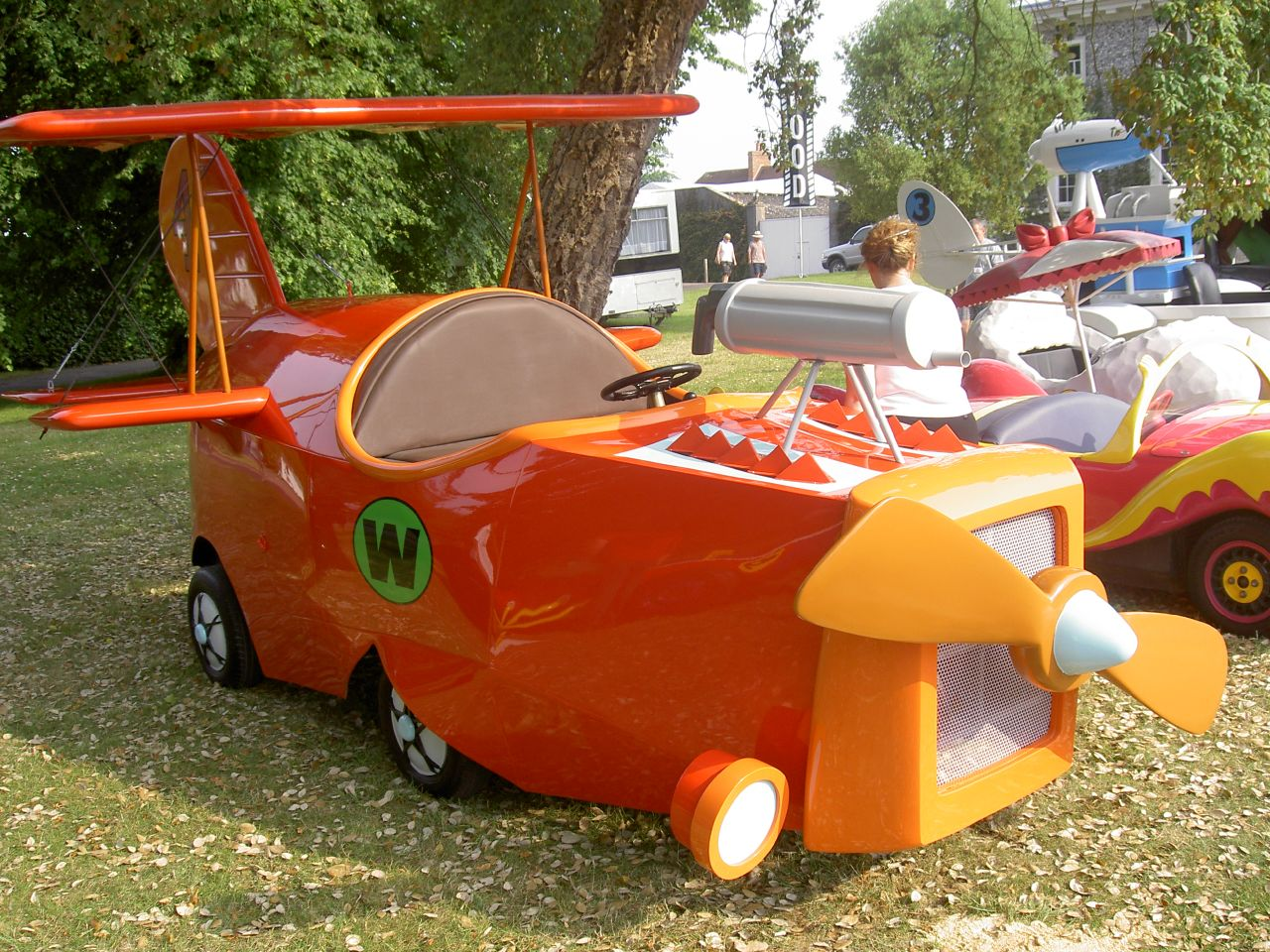
Crimson Haybailer #4

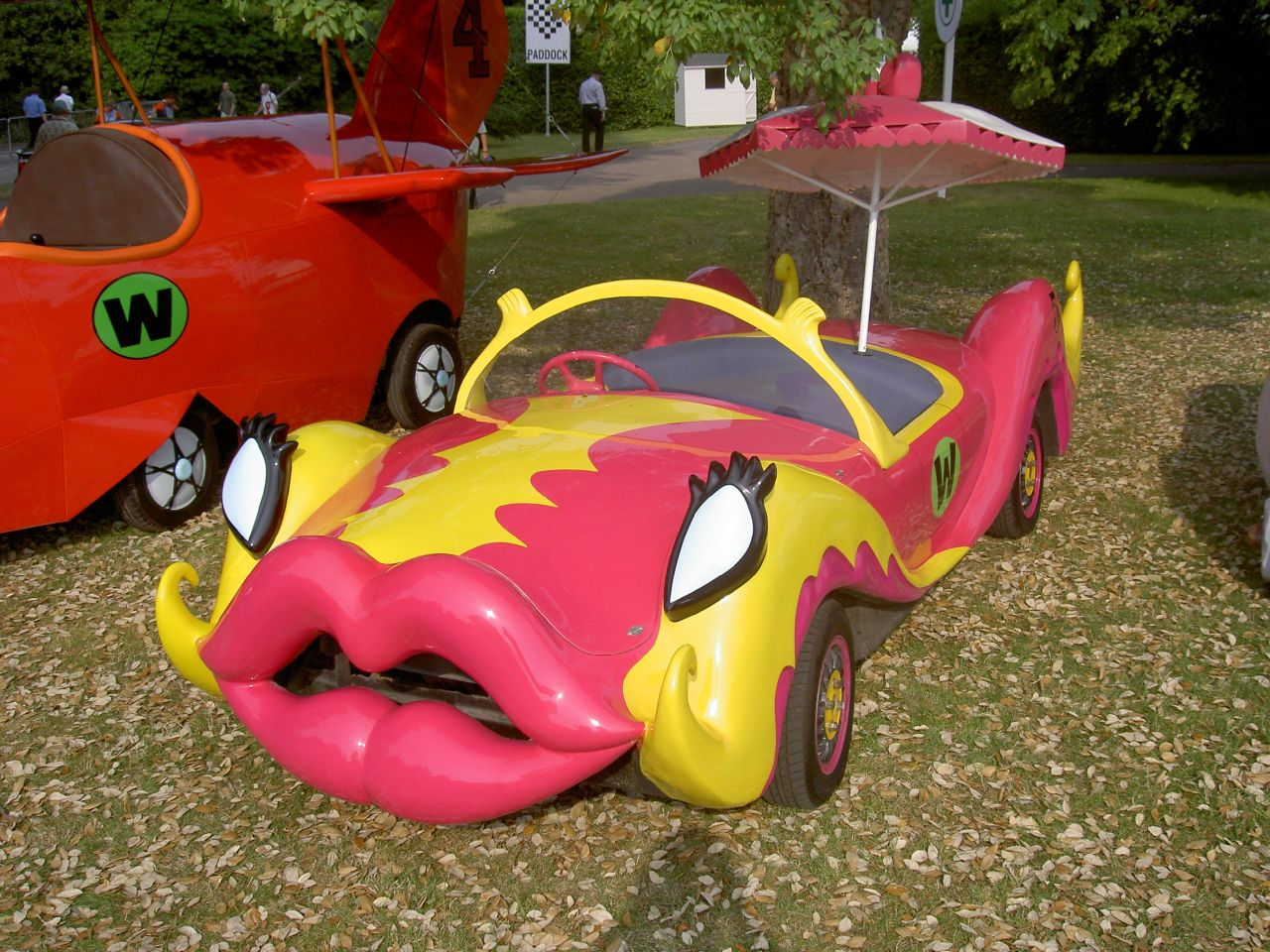
Compact Pussycat #5

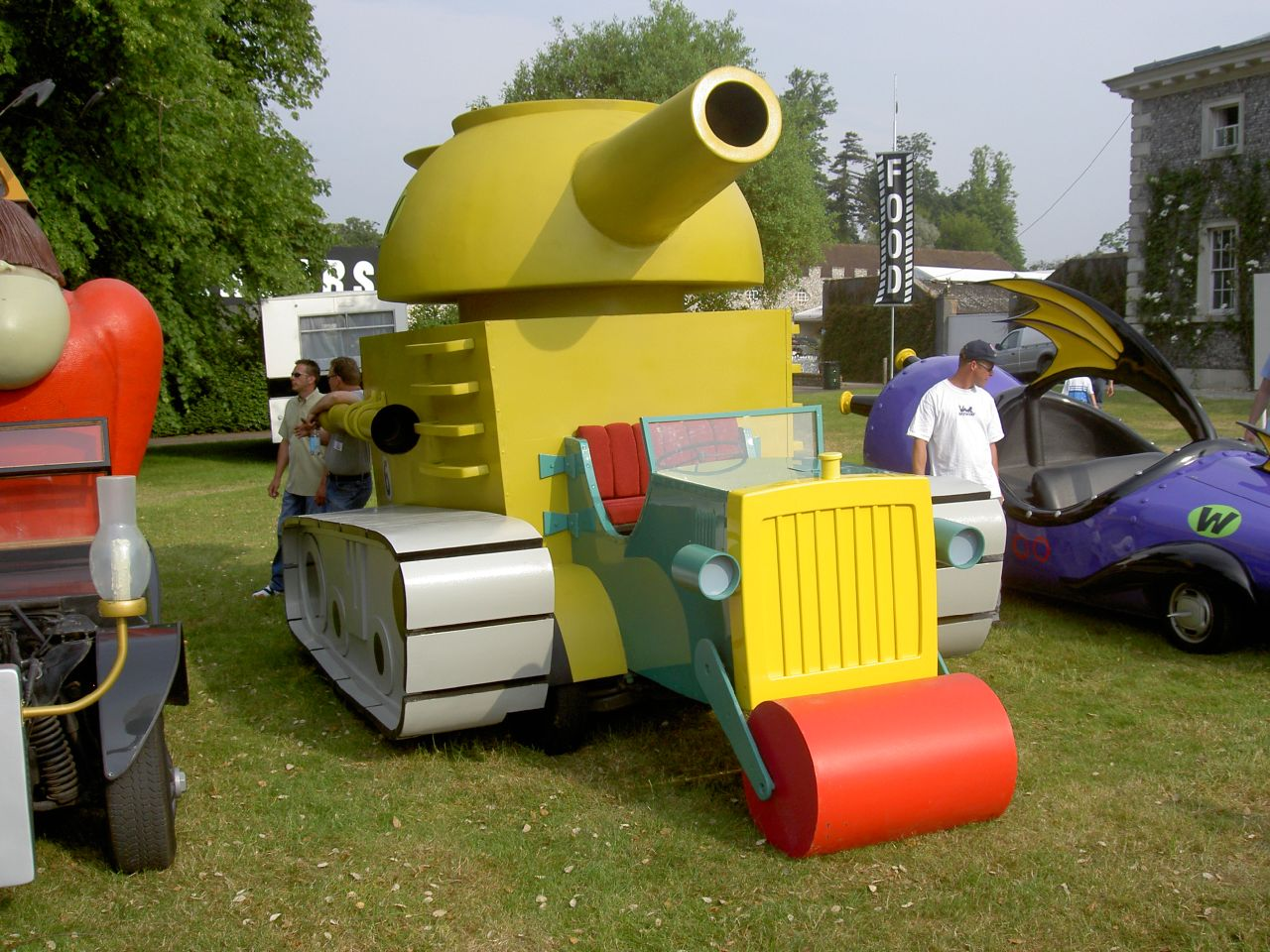
Army Surplus Special #6

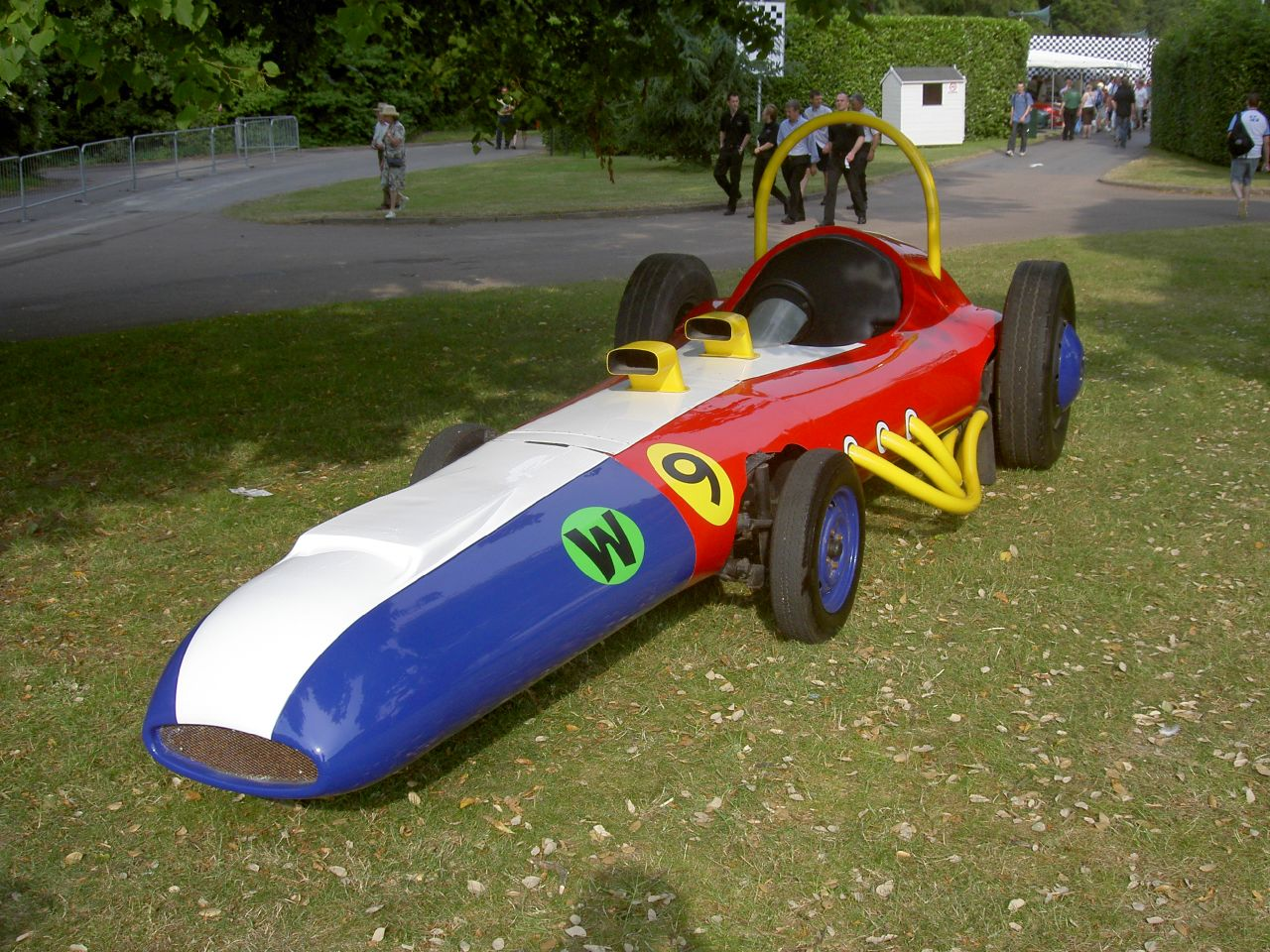
Turbo Terrific #9

The Digimon Frontier episode "Trailmon vs. Trailmon" paid tribute to the show.

In 2006, the car manufacturer Vauxhall launched a television commercial for the British market, parodying Wacky Races with a similar setup featuring Corsa cars. The commercial made several references to the cartoon as well as utilizing the show's theme music and Muttley's iconic snicker.

The British adult comic Viz had a one-off parody strip called "Wacky Racists" with David Irving as Dick Dastardly, Unity Mitford as Penelope Pitstop, Eugène Terre'Blanche as Lazy Luke, Oswald Mosley as Muttley, and comedian Bernard Manning in the "Fatcuntmobile".

In 2013, the car manufacturer Peugeot launched a TV commercial for the Brazilian market (and later used in Spain and Turkey), featuring the cartoon characters in a real-life universe.

Wacky Races was also seen in the South Park episode "Handicar".

Dick Dastardly and Muttley made a cameo in the Uncle Grandpa episode "Uncle Grandpa Retires".

The Buzz Wagon appeared in the OK K.O.! Let's Be Heroes episode "Crossover Nexus".

Dick Dastardly, Muttley, and Penelope Pitstop appear in Space Jam: A New Legacy as spectators of the big game. Dastardly and Muttley appear in their Scoob! forms.

The Army Surplus Special appeared in the Jellystone! episode "My Doggie Dave".

== See also ==
- List of works produced by Hanna-Barbera Productions
- List of Hanna-Barbera characters
