= Dick Dastardly =

Fictional cartoon villain

- Wacky Races character
- Dick Dastardly as seen in Wacky Races
- First appearance: "See-Saw To Arkansas" (1968)
- Created by: William Hanna; Joseph Barbera
- Portrayed by: Porter Flynn (2013)
- Voiced by: Paul Winchell (1968–1991); Malcolm McNeill (Spin a Magic Tune); Michael Bell (1990); Rob Paulsen (1991); Jim Cummings (2000–2008); Jeff Bergman (2000–2023; Cartoon Network); Trey Parker (South Park); Eric Bauza (2015; Uncle Grandpa); Peter Woodward (2017–2019); Tom Kenny (2018); Jason Isaacs (2020; Scoob!); Terry Mynott (Dastardly and Muttley); Dwight Schultz (Jellystone!)

In-universe information
- Full name: Richard Milhous Dastardly
- Aliases: Dastardly; Simon Cowell (disguise, Scoob!); Officer Jaffe (disguise, Scoob!); Fred Jones (disguise, Scoob!)
- Species: Human
- Gender: Male
- Family: Delilah Dastardly (wife); Dick Dastardly III (son); Dread Baron (twin brother); Desdemona Dastardly (cousin); Sheriff Longarm D. Law (cousin); Pop (Dick Dastardly I) (father)
- Nationality: English-American

Dick Dastardly is a fictional character and the main antagonist who has appeared in various animated series by Hanna-Barbera Productions from 1968 onward. Dastardly's most famous appearances are in the series Wacky Races and its spin-off, Dastardly and Muttley in Their Flying Machines. He is partly based on the English actor Terry-Thomas.

== Voice actors ==
The character was originally voiced by Paul Winchell, using a characterization that Winchell would also employ several years later to voice the Smurfs' nemesis Gargamel. Winchell's facial structures were caricatured in the related character design as well.

In subsequent depictions of the character, Dick Dastardly was voiced by Rob Paulsen and by Jim Cummings (the latter of whom was notable for voicing other characters previously voiced by Winchell, including Tigger and Zummi Gummi).

Dastardly's catchphrases in the cartoons were "Muttley, do something!", "Drat, and double drat!" and occasionally "Triple drat!" or "Curses, foiled again!"

== Appearances ==
=== Wacky Races ===
In Wacky Races, Dastardly was one of the drivers who competed in each episode for first place, in a long and hazard-filled cross-country road rally. As his name implies, Dastardly aimed to win solely through cheating and trickery. His race car, numbered double-zero and named The Mean Machine, featured all sorts of devious traps for him to use against his opponents. As Wacky Races was inspired by the film The Great Race, so was Dastardly derived from the film's chief villain, Professor Fate, played by Jack Lemmon. Dastardly in this series wore old-fashioned racer's gear — a long blue duster overcoat often worn by early motorists, along with long red gloves, a large striped hat with driving goggles attached, and sporting a handlebar mustache.

Dastardly was aided in his schemes by his sidekick, a scruffy anthropomorphic dog named Muttley who had a distinctive wheezy laugh, heard most often when Dastardly's schemes failed. Despite Dastardly and Muttley's best efforts, the "double-dealing do-badders", as the opening narration of Wacky Races describes them, failed to win a single race. Dastardly came close to winning on several occasions, but always failed, either through his own actions or bad luck, such as posing for his picture as it was a photo finish, stopping to sign an autograph for Muttley, and having Muttley sabotage his own vehicle (Dick told the hound to "stop the winning car"). On one occasion, Dastardly did cross the finish line in first place, but was revealed to have extended the nose of his car at the last moment, and was disqualified in favor of Penelope Pitstop; this despite the fact that other characters had pulled similar stunts in the past without punishment (and indeed the original footage showed that Dastardly had not extended the nose of his car). In another episode, The Mean Machine accidentally crossed the finish line first, but Dick was still disqualified; due to a series of crazy vehicle mix-ups, Dastardly and Muttley were in the wrong car!

If Dastardly had not bothered to cheat, he could have won many of the races legitimately, as the Mean Machine was the fastest car on the grid and Dick's driving skills were often shown to be superior to the other drivers. (Indeed, he was able to take the lead in several races, but rather than continue to Victory Lane, Dastardly would stop to set traps for the other drivers.) Alas, Dick seemed bound to a code similar to that of wrestler Gorgeous George: "Win if you can, lose if you must, but always cheat!" (In fact, in one episode he came close to crossing the finish line first without cheating, but chose not to win and let the other racers finish before him, as he did not want to win fairly.)

=== Dastardly and Muttley in Their Flying Machines ===
Dick Dastardly (actually Dick Dastardly Sr.; see below) continued his villainous career in the Wacky Races spin-off Dastardly and Muttley in Their Flying Machines. The series was inspired by the 1965 film Those Magnificent Men in Their Flying Machines and Dastardly's appearance is based on the film's villain, Sir Percival Ware-Armitage, played by Terry-Thomas. Dastardly and Muttley flew with two other pilots: Zilly, a coward who would hide in his own clothing when ordered to deploy, and Klunk, the mechanic/inventor, who speaks a language largely composed of strange sounds that only Zilly can understand.

Together, they comprised the "Vulture Squadron". The squadron constantly attempted to stop a messenger pigeon, "Yankee Doodle Pigeon", from delivering messages to an opposing army, often with the song "Stop the Pigeon" playing. A typical scene shows the Vulture Squadron all converging from different directions on Yankee Doodle Pigeon, only to end up crashing into one another—while the bird remained unharmed. As in Wacky Races, Dastardly continued to fail miserably at his mission, only coming near to success on a single occasion. Muttley, despite showing enough competence to win various medals which Dastardly was constantly threatening to revoke, seemed to delight in Dick's failures, displaying his trademark snickering laugh.

=== Yogi's Treasure Hunt ===
In later years, Dastardly and Muttley were the nemeses for Yogi Bear and his friends in the 1980s series Yogi's Treasure Hunt. This time, Dick repeatedly failed at discovering hidden treasure before Yogi and his team. It was in this series' episode Yogi's Heroes that Dick's full name was revealed; as the leader of an island named Dicaragua, he introduced himself as Richard Milhous Dastardly (a play on former U.S. President Richard Milhous Nixon). One episode shows that Dastardly and Muttley are the greediest creatures in the world.

=== Fender Bender 500 ===
Dick Dastardly and Muttley were in the "Fender Bender 500" shorts on the early 1990s short-lived series Wake, Rattle, and Roll. In those segments, the duo once again appeared in a souped-up version of the Mean Machine as a monster truck called the Dirty Truckster (a pun on the phrase "dirty trickster"), but raced against such Hanna-Barbera stalwarts as Yogi Bear and Quick Draw McGraw. In this series, they were actually able to pull off at least two race wins, one when racing to Russia's 'Red Square' where it was announced that the prize was itself the Red Square. Unfortunately, their prize was simply a piece of red square paper, and not the deed to the Russian capital as the title of 'red square' would imply. In another Fender Bender race (The "Hit 'n' Mississippi 500"), he played on Yogi Bear's famous catchphrase of being "smarter than the average bear" by claiming to be "smarter than the average cheat".

=== Yo Yogi! ===
Dick Dastardly (alongside Muttley) appeared as a child (known as Dickie) in the short-lived series Yo Yogi!, voiced by Rob Paulsen. In the series he rides a bicycle that resembles the Mean Machine and his clothes resemble his ones from Dastardly and Muttley in Their Flying Machines. Dick Dastardly would often come up with various plots which would often backfire on him.

=== Wacky Races Forever (2006) ===
The series depicted a roster of both new and returning racers competing against each other. Penelope Pitstop and Peter Perfect had married and created Perfect Industries, the corporate sponsor of the new Wacky Races; their children, Parker and Piper, competed in the race. Dick Dastardly (voiced by Jim Cummings) appears in this and hatches a plan to take them out of the race but has it backfire on himself instead.

=== Wacky Races (2017) ===
In the 2017 reboot of Wacky Races it is revealed that the Dick Dastardly who flew in World War I (voiced by Tom Kenny) was the father of the Dick Dastardly (presumably Dick Jr.) of the original Wacky Races. In the new version, Dick Jr.'s son/descendant, Dick Dastardly III, technically wins in the episode "Sister Twister" – winning the "Great Sportsman of the Year" trophy after he made a bet with Peter Perfect that involved him being nice and not cheating for once. He won due to Pandora Pitstop disguising herself as Penelope Pitstop who proceeded to act unsportmans-like and so the judges gave the win to Dastardly – however – to Dastardly's horror. He won by due to the sudden shift in his personality, such as saying nicer things to other racers and not cheating. The event also involved race, which Dastardly of course lost, though it had no effect on who won the trophy.

In the episode "Grandfather Knows Dast", the original Dick Dastardly (World War I flying ace) rides with Dick Dastardly III, and chastises Dick Dastardly III for cheating instead of winning and ultimately causes them to lose the race just as they were about to win.

=== Scoob! ===
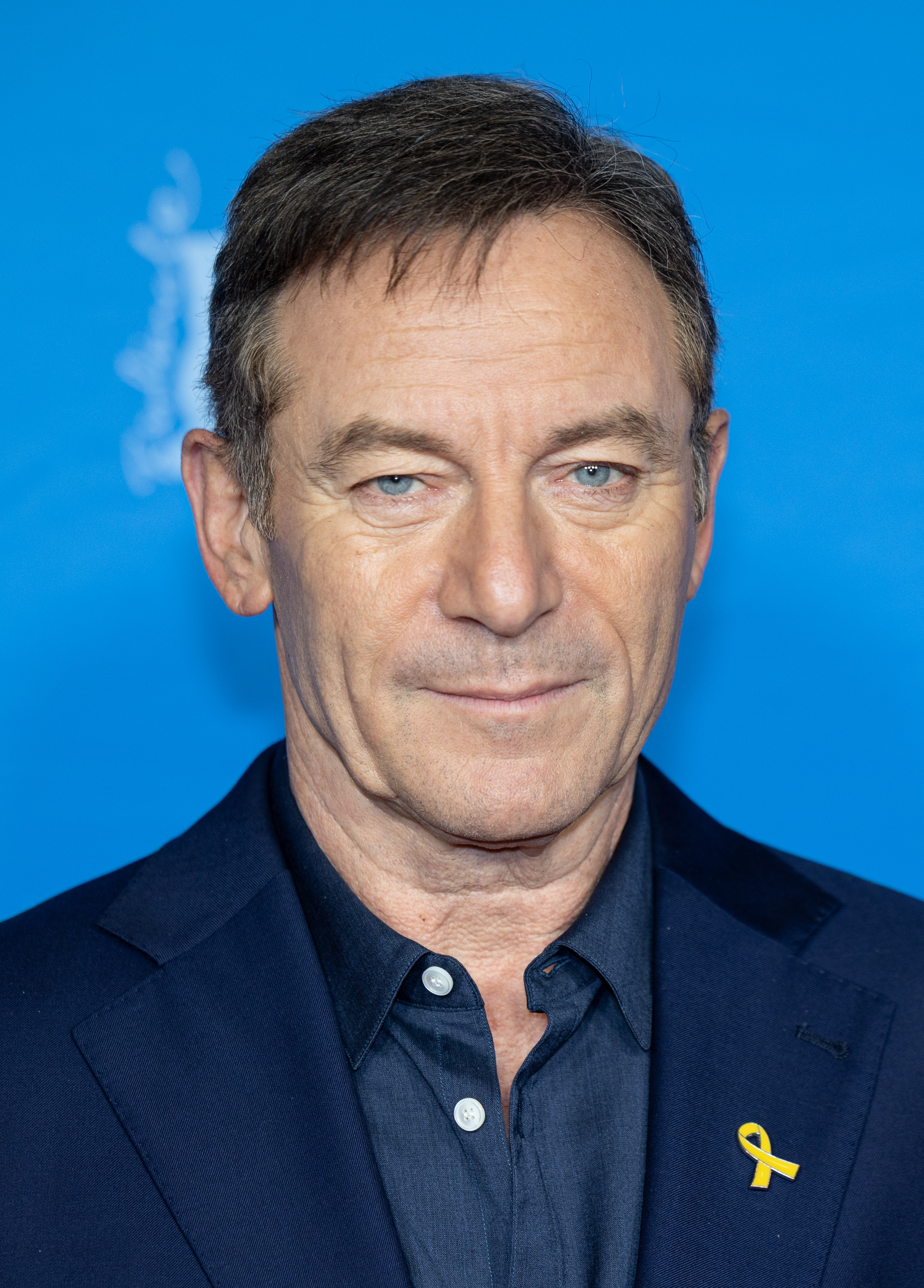
Jason Isaacs voices Dick Dastardly in Scoob!.

Dick Dastardly is the main antagonist in the 2020 computer-animated Scooby-Doo film Scoob!, voiced by Jason Isaacs. This version of Dick lacks the hat and goggles he usually wears, and his overcoat is now a dark purple long coat. According to his police report, this version of Dastardly is 6' 5", 295lbs. He is also depicted as more of a supervillain than a racer, having robotic minions called Rottens and being an enemy of the Blue Falcon. He operates a giant airship that is loosely based on his racing vehicle, the Mean Machine. During a scheme to steal the treasure horde left by Alexander the Great in the Greek underworld by use of a dimensional portal, Dastardly lost Muttley in the underworld when the portal was found to be one way only. He then seeks out the three skulls of Cerberus and Scooby-Doo because as the last descendant of Peritas, Alexander's dog, he is the key to opening the gates to the Underworld and reuniting with Muttley; though at the cost of unleashing Cerberus onto the world. After achieving this, Dastardly and Muttley try to escape with treasure, but are captured by the reformed Rottens and taken into custody by Blue Falcon, Dynomutt, and Dee Dee Skyes. During his capture, Dick attempts a double-mask trick by wearing a mask of himself over a mask of Simon Cowell to make them think that Dick Dastardly was a disguise of Cowell. During the credits, Muttley breaks Dastardly out of prison.

=== Jellystone! ===
Dick Dastardly appeared in the third season of Jellystone!, voiced by Dwight Schultz. Dick Dastardly is the mayor of New Bedrock and is sporting his outfit from Dastardly and Muttley in Their Flying Machines.

== Other appearances ==
- Universal Studios Florida formerly had a motion simulator ride titled The Funtastic World of Hanna-Barbera which was a tribute to Hanna-Barbera cartoons; Dastardly (voiced by Michael Bell) alongside Muttley kidnap Elroy Jetson, so Yogi and Boo-Boo Bear have to travel across the various worlds of Hanna-Barbera to rescue him. At the end of the ride Dastardly is arrested and sent to a flying jail cell.
- Dick Dastardly, Muttley, and the Mean Machine returned as a boss car in the 2000 Wacky Races video game, voiced by Jim Cummings and Billy West. They are the protagonists in the earlier 1991 version.
  - A remastered version of the game, called Wacky Races: Starring Dastardly and Muttley, is notable for allowing players to have Dick Dastardly finally win a race. If the player wins as him, the narrator is taken aback or disgusted and Dastardly is happy and surprised at winning a race.
- Dick Dastardly made a non-speaking cameo in the Harvey Birdman, Attorney at Law episode "Death by Chocolate".
- In the pilot of Wacky Races Forever, Dastardly (voiced by Jim Cummings) and Muttley are the main villains, working for the vice-president of Perfect Industries in an attempt to stop the other racers from crossing the finish line. The series was not picked up by the network.
- Dastardly and Muttley were to appear in the series The Perils of Penelope Pitstop, where they (especially Dastardly) would have been perfect villains given the tone and the Perils of Pauline references, rather they were imagined to be the bodyguards of a younger brother of Penelope. However, this was only in the first sketches of the series, and the two did not appear in the final work. In the first of their encounters, the Hooded Claw did ask Penelope "Who did you expect, Dick Dastardly?" possibly in reference to the above unshot scene.
- Dastardly and Muttley cameo in the South Park episode "Handicar" as participants in the return of Wacky Races.
- Dastardly also did an announcement for Cartoon Network, voiced by Jeff Bergman.
- Dastardly and Muttley are named in the Madvillain song "Accordion", from their 2004 album Madvillainy.
- Dastardly makes a cameo in the Uncle Grandpa episode "Uncle Grandpa Retires" voiced by Eric Bauza. He and Muttley appear as attendees at the Big Race.
- Dick Dastardly appears as one of the main characters in 2016's Wacky Raceland. In this version, it is revealed that before the apocalyptic event that ravaged Earth, Dick Dastardly was a world-famous pianist named Richard D'Astardlien who agreed to enter the race to Earth's last known paradise Utopia so that he could have a chance of seeing his wife and son being reborn.
  - Another version of Dick Dastardly appeared in Dastardly & Muttley, also published by DC Comics under the Hanna-Barbera Beyond initiative. This version is Lt. Col. Richard "Dick" Atcherly, a United States Air Force pilot who is sent to shoot down the rogue drone "War Pig One" and is mutated by the mysterious element "unstabilium", becoming increasingly insane and subject to cartoon physics.
- Dastardly and Muttley appear as contestants in a futuristic car race against Philip J. Fry, in Futurama Comics #82.
- A live action version of Wacky Races was created for a campaign for Peugeot in 2013 in which Dastardly (played by actor Porter Flynn) and Muttley (performed by Mark Jeffris) race through the city against Penelope Pitstop, Peter Perfect, The Red Max, The Slag Brothers, The Ant Hill Mob, The Gruesome Twosome and Sergeant Blast and Private Meekly.
- Dick Dastardly appears in the 2021 film Space Jam: A New Legacy. He is among the characters that watch the basketball game between the Tune Squad and the Goon Squad where his car is seen during the shots with the game's announcers Ernie Johnson Jr. and Lil Rel Howery. Dastardly sports the same CGI design he had from Scoob!.
