= Wacky Races: Mad Motors =

2007 video game

- Developer: Coyote Console
- Publisher: Blast! Entertainment
- Platform: PlayStation 2
- Release: AU: June 21, 2007; EU: June 22, 2007
- Genre: Racing
- Modes: Single player, 2-4 multiplayer

Wacky Races: Mad Motors is a 2007 racing video game developed by British studio Coyote Console and published by Blast! Entertainment for the PlayStation 2 video game console. It is based on Wacky Races.
