= Wacky Races (1991 video game) =

1991 video game for the NES

- North American box art
- Developer: Atlus
- Publisher: Atlus
- Composer: Hidehito Aoki
- Platform: Nintendo Entertainment System
- Release: JP: December 25, 1991; NA: May 1992
- Genre: Platform
- Mode: Single-player

Wacky Races (チキチキマシン猛レース, Chiki Chiki Machine Mou Race) is a platform game for the Nintendo Entertainment System, developed and published by Atlus. The game is based on the Hanna-Barbera cartoon Wacky Races and features Muttley and Dick Dastardly as the main characters.

An unrelated Amiga, Amstrad CPC, Atari ST, Commodore 64 and ZX Spectrum game of the same name was released in 1991 and a racing game of the same name released in 2000.

== Gameplay ==
The player controls Muttley through three different areas (Hip Hop, Splish Splash and Go Go America) which can be selected from a map screen, and all three must be completed to reach the game's ending. The first two areas have three stages each, while Go Go America has four. The player can jump and initially use a short-ranged bite attack, but by collecting bones, the player can swap them in a fashion reminiscent of the Gradius series for a bomb attack, a flying "bark shot", the ability to glide with Muttley's tail, and extra health. Each of the ten stages ends in a boss battle against one of the other ten racers. Defeating one will clear the current stage and defeating all three/four in that area will allow progression to the next area.

The game features a rendition of the theme song from the Japanese dub of the TV series as the title screen music.

== Reception ==
Reception

Review scores
Publication	Score
Famitsu	28/40
GamePro	17/25
Nintendo Power	3.8/5

According to the reviewers at Nintendo Power, Wacky Races is just another run-and-jump game that could appeal to those who fondly remember the cartoon and its characters. GamePro's Feline Groove perceived the game as a "fun" adventure that echoes the cartoon, with a difficulty level suitable for the average gamer. Meanwhile, Famicom Tsūshin's reviewers found the gameplay of チキチキマシン猛レース to be standard, claiming that it provided them with only a fifth of the enjoyment they had when playing Super Mario.
