= Wacky Races: Starring Dastardly and Muttley =

2000 video game

- PlayStation 2 cover art
- Developer: Infogrames Sheffield House
- Publisher: Infogrames
- Platforms: Dreamcast, PlayStation 2
- Release: Dreamcast: NA: June 27, 2000; EU: June 30, 2000; PlayStation 2: EU: June 29, 2001
- Genre: Racing
- Modes: Single-player, multiplayer

Wacky Races: Starring Dastardly and Muttley is a 2000 kart racing game developed by Infogrames Sheffield House and published by Infogrames for the Dreamcast (under the title Wacky Races) and later for PlayStation 2 in 2001. The game is based on the cartoon series Wacky Races, which features 11 vehicles all racing over various landscapes to win first place. The vehicles featured include the most infamous vehicle in the series, the Mean Machine, driven by Dick Dastardly and Muttley.

== Gameplay ==
The game includes two modes: Arcade and Adventure. Arcade mode features normal racing across various tracks. In Adventure mode, the player races on tracks to win gold stars or Wacky Trial clocks to unlock more tracks, abilities, and challenges. Wacky Trial clocks are rewarded when a race is won in a certain amount of time. These are needed to unlock boss challenges as well. Gold stars are needed to unlock various things, such as tracks and areas. They are gained by winning various events. Once 10 gold stars have been rewarded, the Boss Area is unlocked, in which the player must compete against one of three "elite" cars: Professor Pat Pending's Convert-a-Car, the Red Max's Crimson Haybailer, and the Mean Machine. Dastardly and Muttley are the main bosses of the game, with many of their power-ups geared towards attack.

Gadgets include an explosive mine that can be placed along the road, turbo speed, a temporary flying ability, and temporary invincibility. Pink discs known as "Tokens" float along the track. When picked up they fuel gadgets and give the player the option to perform one. Once they are used, they are shot out the back and left for other drivers to pick up.

All the vehicles and drivers from the cartoon are featured in the game, but there is only an eight-car grid, preventing them all from racing at once. The vehicles are put into five groups based on their acceleration, speed, and handling. The game features four themed levels, including a desert with Wild West towns and coal mines, snow-covered mountain towns, a Wacky Races version of Mount Rushmore, and a large city with rooftop race tracks (not featured in the Dreamcast version).

The game is notable for allowing players to have Dick Dastardly finally win a race. If the player wins as him, the narrator is taken aback or disgusted and Dastardly is happy and surprised at winning a race.

== Development ==
Both Janet Waldo and John Stephenson reprise their roles as Penelope Pitstop and Luke respectively.

The PlayStation 2 version of the game was only released in PAL regions. Although there was plans to also release the PlayStation 2 version in North America once.

== Reception ==
Reception

Aggregate score
Aggregator	Score	
Aggregator	Dreamcast	PS2
GameRankings	84%	70%

Review scores
Publication	Score	
Publication	Dreamcast	PS2
AllGame	3.5/5	N/A
CNET Gamecenter	8/10	N/A
Consoles +	87%	75%
Electronic Gaming Monthly	7/10 (Note: Three critics of Electronic Gaming Monthly gave the Dreamcast version each a score of 7/10, 6.5/10, and 7.5/10.)	N/A
Eurogamer	8/10	N/A
Game Informer	6/10	N/A
GameFan	(J.W.) 71% 70% (Note: In GameFan's viewpoint of the Dreamcast version, three critics gave it each a score of 63, 71, and 75.)	N/A
GamePro	4/5	N/A
GameRevolution	B+	N/A
GameSpot	7.8/10	N/A
GameSpy	8/10	N/A
IGN	8.4/10	N/A
Next Generation	4/5	N/A
PlayStation Official Magazine – UK	N/A	6/10

The Dreamcast version received favorable reviews, while the PlayStation 2 version received above-average reviews, according to the review aggregation website GameRankings. Greg Orlando of NextGen, reviewing the former console version, was generally positive to the game, but thought that the racing fans will likely forget this "crazy-fun" adaptation, and recommended the title to the fans of Hanna Barbera cartoon.
