= The Jetsons: Cogswell's Caper! =

1992 video game

- Developer: Natsume
- Publisher: Taito
- Designers: Isao Matono; S. Nishiyama; Hiroshi Tsujino
- Programmers: K. Sakai; Hiroshi Hishikawa
- Artists: Shuya Takaoka; Atsumi Takino; T. Ohyama; T. Kaname
- Composers: Iku Mizutani; Kazuko Umino
- Platform: NES/Family Computer
- Release: NA: December 1992; JP: April 23, 1993; EU: August 26, 1993
- Genre: 2D action platformer
- Mode: Single-player

The Jetsons: Cogswell's Caper! (ジェットソン Cogswell's Caper!) is a 1993 video game based on the animated sitcom The Jetsons. It was developed by Natsume and published by Taito for the Nintendo Entertainment System/Family Computer, and was released in the United States in 1992 and in other territories in 1993.

== Gameplay ==
Gameplay screenshot.

In this spin-off adventure, George Jetson is ordered by his faithful employer Spacely Sprockets to put a stop to Mr. Cogswell's profit-making schemes; especially that of a dangerous mining facility on planet M38 is being built. This game is a side-scrolling action game where George can walk, crouch, and jump (with the help of a jet pack). Each level is littered with crates and other items that George can pick up and toss at enemies. Since the game is set in the retrofuturistic world of The Jetsons, there are also a generous amount of switches on walls which can do amazing features.

These features include a switch that can reverse gravity for a brief time, along with other surprises. All of George's family will provide him with tools to meet each challenge that lies ahead. Infinite continues allows players to finish this difficult video game at their leisure.

Eight stages await the player; with several smaller-length levels. The gameplay has been compared to Chip 'n Dale Rescue Rangers for its throwing object-focused gameplay style. Despite featuring unlimited continues, its difficulty is noticeably high.

== Reception ==
Electronic Gaming Monthly assigned this game a 73% rating in its January 1993 issue.
