= Wake, Rattle, and Roll =

American live-action/animated television series

- Title card
- Genre: Comedy
- Created by: David Kirschner
- Written by: Laren Bright; Brady Connell; Don Dougherty; David Kirschner; Ken Knox; Linda Krause; Earl Kress; Kristina Luckey; Bill Matheny; David Schwartz; Carl Swenson; Marlowe Weisman
- Directed by: Doug Rogers; Steven J. Santos
- Creative director: Rick Schneider-Calabash
- Starring: R.J. Williams; Avery Schreiber; Ebonie Smith; Terri Ivens
- Voices of: Charlie Adler; Greg Burson; Tim Curry; Dick Gautier; Marvin Kaplan; John Mariano; Allan Melvin; Don Messick; Pat Musick; Rob Paulsen; Neil Ross; Arnold Stang; John Stephenson; Shadoe Stevens; Jean Vander Pyl; Janet Waldo; Frank Welker; Paul Winchell; Jonathan Winters; Patric Zimmerman
- Theme music composer: Joe Curiale
- Composers: Joe Curiale (Fender Bender 500 segments); Udi Harpaz; Bob Mithoff; Michael Tavera (Monster Tails segments)
- Country of origin: United States
- Original language: English
- No. of seasons: 1
- No. of episodes: 50 (list of episodes)

Production
- Executive producers: Shukri Ghalayini; David Kirschner; Ron Ziskin; Cartoon segments: William Hanna; Joseph Barbera; Paul Sabella
- Producers: Cosmo Anzilotti; David Casci; Jim Crum; Jeffrey Hilton; Jeffrey Scott; Kelly Ward; Kay Wright
- Editor: Terry Moore
- Running time: 30 minutes
- Production companies: Hanna-Barbera Productions; Four Point Entertainment

Original release
- Network: Syndication
- Release: September 17, 1990 – January 18, 1991

Related
- Monster Tails; Fender Bender 500

Wake, Rattle, and Roll (retitled Jump, Rattle, and Roll when it aired on The Disney Channel on weekday afternoons in 1991) is an American live-action/animated television series produced by Hanna-Barbera Productions and Four Point Entertainment that premiered in the fall of 1990. As the show's title suggests, Hanna-Barbera intended the show to air on its affiliated stations in a morning timeslot before school. The show's title was inspired by the song "Shake, Rattle and Roll". After its single season on the air in syndication, Wake, Rattle, and Roll moved exclusively to The Disney Channel under the title Jump, Rattle, and Roll, with the title adjustment due to its repeats not being confined to mornings.

Jump, Rattle, and Roll ran on The Disney Channel from October 7, 1991, to 1994, becoming the only Hanna-Barbera animated series ever to air on that network. It has also been screened on Network Ten in Australia, TV1 in Malaysia, Channel 2 in New Zealand, M-Net in South Africa, Channel 5 in Singapore and TV5 in the Philippines while the animated segments were broadcast on ITV in the UK as part of the short running Saturday morning children's programme TV Mayhem, becoming the first series to debut on ITV during TV Mayhem.

== Plot ==
The series was about a boy named Sam Baxter (played by R. J. Williams) and his robot D.E.C.K.S. (voiced by Rob Paulsen; built from old audio/video equipment and a Sony U-Matic videotape head; the name was an acronym for Digital Electronic Cassette-Headed Kinetic System) and their adventures in the basement, which has a time machine that can bring back historical figures.

In some cases, Sam and D.E.C.K.S. occasionally have remote fights in which they each have a remote control and start pressing buttons changing each other from Hanna-Barbera stars to famous movie stars.

== Basement tech ==
Sam's grandpa Dr. Lester T. Quirk (played by Avery Schreiber) is a brilliant inventor and is constantly supplying Sam and DECKS with sci-fi technology to add to their basement bedroom:

- People Processor – A teleporter used to send or retrieve people to and from anywhere in the world. Sometimes, it could even send people through time.
- Mondo-View – A supercomputer that was used for several reasons on the show. For example, Sam is able to talk to Grandpa Quirk anywhere in the world.
- Debbie Detector – A video monitor used by Sam and DECKS to communicate with Sam's older sister Debbie (played by Terri Ivens) which lessens the amount of time Debbie spends in the basement. It often makes an alarm sound when she approaches.

== Cartoon segments ==
After a short live-action skit, D.E.C.K.S. would turn on the television screen on his torso and display an animated short. There are two new Hanna-Barbera series made exclusively for this program.

=== Monster Tails ===
Monster Tails is about the pets of the Universal Monsters who live in a castle in Transylvania with their guardian Igor Jr. (voiced by Charlie Adler), the son of Igor (Iggy for short). Each of them had a similar personality to their masters who are in Hollywood making movies:

- Frankenmutt (voiced by Frank Welker) – The Frankenstein Monster's pet dog. He has incredible strength, organ-playing abilities, and the brain of a genius (literally).
- Elsa (voiced by Pat Musick) – The Bride of Frankenstein's pet dog. Elsa has the brain of a parrot and a crush on Frankenmutt.
- Catula (voiced by Charlie Adler) – Count Dracula's pet cat. Although Catula is arrogant, he is a master of magic and transformations (usually).
- Mumphrey (voiced by Frank Welker impersonating Woody Allen) – The Mummy's pet dog who is a constant insomniac.
- Dr. Veenie (voiced by Jonathan Winters) – Dr. Jekyll's pet dog who is a brilliant scientist. But whenever he sneezes, he transforms into the super-strong (but berserk) Mr. Snyde (who is like Dr. Jekyll's evil alter ego, Mr. Hyde).
- Angel (voiced by Pat Musick) – The Creature from the Black Lagoon's pet goldfish. Angel is a ghost because she was eaten by a shark and tends to shout at certain times.

Monster Tails was also shown in the U.K., on Channel 4's The Big Breakfast in 1993.

==== Episodes ====
1. "Pet Styles of the Rich and Gruesome" – The pets are featured on a TV show called "Pet Styles of the Rich and Gruesome".
2. "Purple Brain" – When Catula steals Frankenmutt's brain, the organ is accidentally exposed to a purple liquid, causing it to grow to giant proportions and wreaking havoc in the castle.
3. "Elsa Dearest" – After ingesting a formula made by Mr. Snyde, Elsa becomes evil and obsessed with cleaning, annoying Catula, Frankenmutt, Iggy, and Dr. Veeny.
4. "Sleepwalk, Don't Run" – While trying to sleep, Mumfrey sleepwalks, getting him and his fellow monster friends into calamity.
5. "Journey to the Center of Iggy" – After coming down with an illness, Frankenmutt and Dr.Veenie shrink themselves and enter Iggy's body to find the source.
6. "To Leech His Own"- Catula tries to rid the castle of a leech that has been drinking up his tomato juice supply.
7. "The Moatside Bassanova" – A moat monster becomes obsessed with romancing Angel, who does not want anything to do with him.
8. "Mighty Iggy at the Bat" –
9. "Pet-refined Fortress" –
10. "Monster Olympics" –
11. "Driving Mr. Iggy" –
12. "Ma Igor" –
13. "Curse of the Mumphrey" –
14. "Mayhem" – The pets play a board game so forbidden that their masters forbade them to play. As they play the game, they soon find out it has a mind of its own.
15. "Mumphrey's the Word" –
16. "Garbage Mouth" –
17. "Tse-tse, Tse-tse, Goodbye" –
18. "Goodbye, Mr. Chump" –
19. "The Minus Touch" –
20. "Dr. Veeny's Beanie" – After mistaking one of Dr. Veeny's invention for a hat, Iggy uses the device to bring anything he imagines to life.
21. "Night of the Living Food" –
22. "Mumphrey's Big Sleep" – Catula manages to put Mumphrey into a deep sleep, only then to have Mumphrey's loud snoring causing earthquakes.
23. "The Flea" –
24. "Attack of the Monster Shadows" –
25. "Luck, Don't Leap" –
26. "The Counter Mental Divide" –
27. "Dog Date Afternoon" – The pets set up Iggy on a blind date.
28. "That Darn Yarn" –
29. "New Corpses on the Slab" – Dr. Veenie, Frankenmutt, and Catula become a rock band called New Corpses on the Slab when Iggy was unable to get tickets for the Graveyard Gang's concert.
30. "Igor No More" – Tired of being a servant, Iggy decides to take a long vacation.
31. "They Call Him...Monster Man" - Iggy becomes a superhero Monster Man.

=== Fender Bender 500 ===
This is a spin-off of Wacky Races for the 1990s, in which classic Hanna-Barbera characters drive monster trucks made for racing. Each vehicle has a different theme, specific to its drivers; e.g., Yogi and Boo Boo's monster truck is a motorized giant picnic basket, while Winsome Witch's monster truck is a wheeled cauldron with a sentient skeleton named Axel on it. Game show announcer from The New Hollywood Squares and disc jockey Shadoe Stevens provided the voice of the race announcer. Since they were in the aforementioned series, Dick Dastardly and Muttley reappear in this segment, reprising their roles as cheaters with their own monster truck called the Dirty Truckster, which is basically their Mean Machine on a monster truck chassis. On a few occasions, they actually win a race, though there is always a catch that renders the win meaningless. Although technically not a series of its own, this is the fourth all-star sports show from Hanna-Barbera. This show also features Paul Winchell's final performance as Hanna-Barbera's long running antagonist, Dick Dastardly.

Axel had a cameo appearance in the Jellystone! episode "Face of the Town".

The competitors, listed by numeral order, as in their race numbers:

- Yogi and Boo-Boo Bear in the Jellystone Jammer (#1)
- Huckleberry Hound and Snagglepuss in the Half-Dog Half-Cat Half-Track (#2)
- Wally Gator and Magilla Gorilla in the Swamp Stoner (#3)
- Top Cat and Choo-Choo in the Alley Cat (#4)
- Quick Draw McGraw and Baba Looey in the Texas Twister (#5)
- Pixie and Dixie in the Cheddar Shredder (#6)
- Augie Doggie and Doggie Daddy in the Lucky Trucky (#7)
- (#8), (#9), (#10), (#11), (#12)
- Winsome Witch and her cat Lucky in the Sonic Broom (#13)
- Dick Dastardly and Muttley in the Dirty Truckster (#00)

==== Episodes ====
No.	Title	Written by
1	The Nippon Tuck 500	Story by: Laren Bright, Kristina Luckey & Earl Kress Teleplay by: Earl Kress
2	The Cow, Sow & Plow 500	Story by: Laren Bright, Kristina Luckey & Earl Kress Teleplay by: Earl Kress
3	The Calypso 500	Story by: Kristina Luckey, Laren Bright & David Schwartz Teleplay by: David Schwartz
4	The Philly Freedom 500	Story by: Laren Bright, Kristina Luckey & Earl Kress Teleplay by: Earl Kress
5	The Hup, Two, Three, Four, 500	Story by: Laren Bright, Kristina Luckey & David Schwartz Teleplay by: David Schwartz
6	The Frances a Lot 500	Story by: Kristina Luckey, Laren Bright & Earl Kress Teleplay by: Earl Kress
7	The Wooden Shoe Like to Win 500	Story by: Laren Bright, Kristina Luckey & Earl Kress Teleplay by: Earl Kress
8	The Rocket Gibraltar 500	Story by: Kristina Luckey, Laren Bright & Earl Kress Teleplay by: Earl Kress
9	Bombay Flambe 500	Laren Bright & Kristina Luckey
10	The Way Down Under 500	Story by: Laren Bright, Kristina Luckey & Ken Knox Teleplay by: Ken Knox
11	Fondue 500	Story by: Kristina Luckey, Laren Bright & David Schwartz Teleplay by: David Schwartz
12	The Kenya Win It 500	Laren Bright & Kristina Luckey
13	The Fettuccini 500	Kristina Luckey & Laren Bright
14	Monumental 500	Story by: Kristina Luckey, Laren Bright & Earl Kress Teleplay by: Earl Kress
15	The High Stakes 500	Story by: Laren Bright, Kristina Luckey & David Schwartz Teleplay by: David Schwartz
16	The Great Golden Gate 500	Kristina Luckey & Laren Bright
17	The Highland Fling 500	Story by: Laren Bright, Kristina Luckey & Evelyn A-R Gabai Teleplay by: Evelyn A-R Gabai
18	Rush to Rushmore 500	Kristina Luckey & Laren Bright
19	Pound for Pound 500	Story by: Kristina Luckey, Laren Bright & Ken Knox Teleplay by: Ken Knox
20	The Great Greek 500	Story by: Laren Bright, Kristina Luckey & David Schwartz Teleplay by: David Schwartz
21	The Log Jammer 500	Story by: Laren Bright, Kristina Luckey & David Schwartz Teleplay by: David Schwartz
22	The Clambake 500	Story by: Laren Bright, Kristina Luckey & Earl Kress Teleplay by: Earl Kress
23	The We’ll Get Bayou 500	Story by: Kristina Luckey, Laren Bright & David Schwartz Teleplay by: David Schwartz
24	The Funhouse 500	Story by: Laren Bright, Kristina Luckey & David Schwartz Teleplay by: David Schwartz
25	Space Race 500	Laren Bright & Kristina Luckey
26	The Wicki Wacki 500	Kristina Luckey & Laren Bright
27	The Big Apple 500	Kristina Luckey & Laren Bright
28	The Panda-Monium 500	Bobs Gannaway
29	The Tumbleweed 500	Story by: Kristina Luckey, Laren Bright & David Schwartz Teleplay by: David Schwartz
30	The Jungle Bungle 500	Bobs Gannaway
31	The Silver Screen 500	Story by: Kristina Luckey, Laren Bright & Earl Kress Teleplay by: Earl Kress
32	The Sheik to Sheik 500	Laren Bright & Kristina Luckey
33	The Cotton Pickin’ 500	Story by: Kristina Luckey, Laren Bright & Earl Kress Teleplay by: Earl Kress
34	The Oom-pa-pah 500	Story by: Kristina Luckey, Laren Bright & David Schwartz Teleplay by: David Schwartz
35	The Fountain of Youth 500	Story by: Laren Bright, Kristina Luckey & Earl Kress Teleplay by: Earl Kress
36	The Fiesta Fantastica 500	Story by: Kristina Luckey, Laren Bright & Earl Kress Teleplay by: Earl Kress
37	The Big Top 500	Story by: Laren Bright, Kristina Luckey & David Schwartz Teleplay by: David Schwartz
38	The Russian Around 500	Story by: Kristina Luckey, Laren Bright & Earl Kress Teleplay by: Earl Kress
39	The Dash to Nashville 500	Story by: Laren Bright, Kristina Luckey & Earl Kress Teleplay by: Earl Kress
40	The Trans-Transylvania 500	Laren Bright & Kristina Luckey
41	The Run Down to Ghost Town 500	Story by: Kristina Luckey, Laren Bright & David Schwartz Teleplay by: David Schwartz
42	The Go for the Gold 500	Story by: Kristina Luckey, Laren Bright & Earl Kress Teleplay by: Earl Kress
43	The Golden State 500	Story by: Laren Bright, Kristina Luckey & David Schwartz Teleplay by: David Schwartz
44	The Hit'n Mississippi 500	Story by: Kristina Luckey, Laren Bright & Earl Kress Teleplay by: Earl Kress
45	The Alligator Alley 500	Story by: Laren Bright, Kristina Luckey & Earl Kress Teleplay by: Earl Kress
46	The Brazilian Million 500	Story by: Kristina Luckey, Laren Bright & David Schwartz Teleplay by: David Schwartz
47	The Emerald Isle 500	Story by: Laren Bright, Kristina Luckey & Earl Kress Teleplay by: Earl Kress
48	The Nile a Minute 500	Laren Bright & Kristina Luckey
49	The Unfathomable 500	Story by: Laren Bright, Kristina Luckey & Earl Kress Teleplay by: Earl Kress
50	The Yukon Win It 500	Story by: Kristina Luckey, Laren Bright & Earl Kress Teleplay by: Earl Kress

=== Filler segments ===
Due to the Disney Channel airing the program without any commercial breaks due to being a premium service at the time, an additional animated segment aired after the last live-action scene. These consisted of two shorts from the H-B archive: a "Dino and Cavemouse" segment from The Flintstone Comedy Show and an "Undercover Elephant" segment from CB Bears.

== Cast ==
- R. J. Williams – Sam Baxter
- Rob Paulsen – D.E.C.K.S., Rewind (voice)
- Ebonie Smith – K.C.
- Terri Ivens – Debbie Baxter
- Avery Schreiber – Grandpa Lester T. Quirk
- Tim Lawrence – D.E.C.K.S. (lead puppeteer)
- Allen Coulter – D.E.C.K.S. (puppeteer)
- Marc L. Tyler – D.E.C.K.S. (puppeteer)
- Adrienne Barbeau – Mrs. Baxter (voice)

=== Guest cast ===
- Danny Lee Clark – Nitro
- Ami Dolenz – Herself
- Adam G. – Chief White Eagle
- Mark Hardrive – Computer Virus
- Gary Marks – Gustarve Eiffel
- Robert Munns – Julius Caesar
- Angil Nigam – Nutinkaumn
- Sinbad – Himself
- Charles Stransky – Private Eye
- Andrea Thompson – Decksella
- Weird Al Yankovic – Himself

=== Voice cast ===
Monster Tails:

- Charlie Adler – Igor Jr., Catula
- Tim Curry – Ronald Chump
- Richard Gautier – Malcolm Milkem
- Pat Musick – Elsa, Angel
- Frank Welker – Frankenmutt, Mumfrey
- Jonathan Winters – Dr. Veenie/Mr. Snyde, Harry Mutsnatcher

Fender Bender 500:

- Greg Burson – Yogi Bear, Huckleberry Hound, Quick Draw McGraw, Snagglepuss
- Marvin Kaplan – Choo-Choo
- John Mariano – Wally Gator
- Allan Melvin – Magilla Gorilla
- Don Messick – Boo-Boo Bear, Pixie, Muttley, Lucky the Cat
- Neil Ross – Axel, Baba Looey
- Arnold Stang – Top Cat
- John Stephenson – Doggie Daddy
- Shadoe Stevens – Announcer
- Jean Vander Pyl – Winsome Witch
- Janet Waldo – Additional voices
- Paul Winchell – Dick Dastardly
- Patric Zimmerman – Augie Doggie, Dixie

== See also ==
- List of works produced by Hanna-Barbera Productions
- List of Hanna-Barbera characters
- The Yogi Bear Show
- Top Cat
- The Quick Draw McGraw Show
- The Magilla Gorilla Show
- The Huckleberry Hound Show
- The Atom Ant/Secret Squirrel Show
- Wacky Races
