= List of DC Comics imprints =

DC Comics has published a number of other imprints and lines of comics over the years.

== History ==
In the Golden Age of Comic Books publishing, DC Comics was also an imprint of Detective Comics and its affiliated companies, All-American Publications and National Allied Publications, that were later all merged into National Periodical Publications, later renamed DC Comics. Before the merger, due to squabbles between the companies, All-American published under its own name/imprint in 1945 starting with the February stand date until the December stand date.

In 1987, DC started Piranha Press as a mature readers line. (Note: Piranha Press. Page 8.) The Elseworlds concept was tested in 1989 with Gotham by Gaslight: An Alternate History of the Batman and became an imprint with 1991's Batman: Holy Terror. Using the licensed Red Circle characters, DC launched the Impact Comics imprint in 1991 as an introductory and new talent imprint. (Note: Impact Comics. Page 6.)

In January 1993, DC's Vertigo imprint was launched with some former DC Comics imprint titles. DC teamed up with Milestone Media to co-publish Milestone Comics starting in 1993. (Note: Milestone. Page 4.) Impact Comics last saw print in July.

Piranha was shut down in 1994 to be replaced by Paradox Press with Milestone Comics following in 1996. In July, the Helix science fiction imprint was launched. In December 1997, the Tangent Comics imprint was published on skip week, then on skip week of September 1998. In August 1998, DC purchased WildStorm, including imprints Cliffhanger, Homage and ABC. 1998 also saw the end of the Helix imprint as its top title was moved to Vertigo, where reprints of the Helix titles also were printed under. (Note: Helix. Page 5.)

In 2001, DC shut down Paradox Press. DC launched a manga imprint, CMX (Note: CMX. Page 10.) and DC Focus in 2004, but Focus was soon shut down in 2005. (Note: DC Focus. Page 7.) Johnny DC was launched in September 2004 with DC Comics' Looney Tunes and Cartoon Network-based comic books. In September 2005, All-Star DC was launched with All Star Batman & Robin, the Boy Wonder. In May 2007, DC launched a line for young women called Minx. Also that year, DC entered the webcomic market with Zuda Comics. (Note: Zuda Comics. Page 3.)

After seeing Tangent characters in the regular DC Universe in Infinite Crisis in 2006, in Ion #9–10 in 2007 and then in Countdown to Final Crisis, the Tangent imprint was revived in March 2008, for a 12-issue maxiseries. The Red Circle line began print in 2008 as DC's second attempt with the Red Circle characters, this time as part of the DC Universe. The Milestone characters were also licensed in 2008 to be included in the DC Universe. With no placement in major bookstores in the young adult section, Minx was canceled in September 2008. With some licensed pulp characters mixed with pulp-like DC characters, DC launched the First Wave line in 2009.

In July 2010, DC shutdown its CMX imprint and moved Megatokyo to the DC imprint. Later in September, as part of DC Entertainment's reorganization, DC ended WildStorm and Zuda imprints and Bob Harris was named Editor-in-Chief for all remaining imprints: DC, Mad and Vertigo. With the New 52 reboot in September 2011, the Wildstorm characters were adapted into the DC Universe within the "Edge" line, which also featured the Western and war comics. The Earth One graphic novel imprint was launched in November 2010. By the end of 2011, the First Wave line was discontinued.

In a May 2017 editorial leadership reorganization, three Executive Editors split up DC Comics and its imprints. Pat McCallum took the DC superhero titles and Mark Doyle the two mature imprints, Vertigo and Young Animal. Executive Editor Bobbie Chase was given custom comics, DC Kids, Digital First titles, Hanna-Barbera Beyond comics, Milestone comics, the relaunched WildStorm Universe, and the young reader imprint.

In 2018, DC Comics launched a number of new imprints and lines. Imprints included DC Black Label, youth-oriented DC Ink and DC Zoom and Brian Michael Bendis' Wonder Comics imprint, while DC imprint Vertigo launched a Sandman Universe line.

DC Comics discontinued all imprints as of January 2020 while implementing a new age-specific identification of DC Kids (ages 8–12), DC (ages 13 and older) and DC Black Label (ages 17 and above and a reuse of the former label name). This does not apply to the pop-up imprints like Young Animal and The Wild Storm.

== Imprints ==
=== Absolute Universe ===
Absolute Universe
- Status: Active
- Founded: 2024
- Publication types: Graphic novels
- Fiction genres: Superheroes

The Absolute Universe (AU) is a shared universe featuring reimagined, modern takes on many of DC's superhero properties. The imprint debuted following the 2024 Absolute Power crossover event.

=== All Star ===
All Star DC
- Status: Inactive
- Founded: September 2005
- Publication types: Comics
- Fiction genres: Superheroes (Note: All-Star DC. Page 2.)

All Star, or All Star DC, was a DC imprint that allowed big name creators to make "out-of-continuity" stories of DC major characters. All Star was DC's answer to Marvel's Ultimate imprint. The original purposes of the line was to have stories featuring the characters in their "most identifiable versions as seen by the world outside of comics", but based on the creators recruited, the purpose shifted to the creators' vision.

Only two out of the four planned miniseries made it to print. All-Star Superman was considered a landmark series for the Superman character and the creators. The other title, All Star Batman & Robin, the Boy Wonder, was never finished (the last two issues remain unpublished to this day), but created a lot of discussions. The title is expected to get new branding as Dark Knight, if and when it resumes. Due to scheduling issues of the creative team, the status of writer Geoff Johns and artist J. G. Jones' All Star Batgirl by November 2008 was on indefinite hold. Adam Hughes was working on the All Star Wonder Woman book with some pages completed by November 2008.

All Star DC imprint was launched in September 2005 with All Star Batman & Robin, the Boy Wonder.

A direct-to-video animated film was made based on All-Star Superman by Warner Home Video and released in February 2011.

=== Amalgam Comics ===
Amalgam Comics
- Founded: 1996
- Defunct: 1997
- Publication types: Comics
- Fiction genres: Superheroes

Amalgam Comics was a joint imprint from Marvel Comics and DC Comics that published amalgamated characters such as the Dark Claw, Iron Lantern, Spider-Boy, and Lobo the Duck. Amalgam Comics published a total of 24 comics, with the first 12 comics being published in April 1996 in-between issues #3 and 4 of the miniseries DC vs. Marvel and the other 12 issues being published in June 1997.

=== DC Black Label ===
DC Black Label
- Status: Active
- Founded: 2018
- Publication types: Graphic novels
- Fiction genres: Superheroes

DC Black Label is DC Comics' out of continuity all-star creator imprint.

This imprint allows creators to craft stories about DC's superheroes outside of restrictive continuity. The initial lineup included creators such as Frank Miller, Kelly Sue DeConnick, Scott Snyder, Lee Bermejo, and more. The earliest known release is Batman: Damned by Bermejo and Brian Azzarello in September 2018.

=== DC Focus ===
DC Focus
- Founded: 2004
- Defunct: mid-2005
- Publication types: Comics
- Fiction genres: Alternative

Focus or DC Focus was an alternative imprint from DC Comics launched in 2004. The imprint was an alternative in that the titles were about people with superpowers without costumes or fighting crime. While the imprint had four solid titles, the line was closed in mid-2005, with only Hard Time moving to the main DC imprint in a second series.

=== DC Ink ===
DC Ink
- Status: Active
- Founded: 2018
- Key people: Bobbie Chase
- Publication types: Graphic novels
- Fiction genres: Superheroes

DC Ink is a graphic novel imprint for younger readers.

In a May 2017 editorial leadership reorganization, three Executive Editors split up DC Comics and its imprints. Executive Editor Bobbie Chase was given custom comics, DC Kids, Digital First titles, Hanna-Barbera comics, Milestone and the relaunched WildStorm Universe. The next year in February, DC unveiled two new graphic novel imprints aimed at younger readers. DC Zoom is focused on young readers, while DC Ink is aimed at young adults. Creators include Danielle Paige, Lauren Myracle, Marie Lu, and more. The books came in a standard format with a standard price: 192 pages for $16.99. Ink launched in September 2018 with Harley Quinn: Breaking Glass by Tamaki and Steve Pugh.

=== DC Zoom ===
DC Zoom
- Status: Active
- Founded: 2018
- Key people: Bobbie Chase
- Publication types: Graphic novels
- Fiction genres: Superheroes

DC Zoom is a graphic novel imprint aimed at younger readers. DC Zoom is focused on young readers, while DC Ink is aimed at young adults. Creators include Mariko Tamaki, Ridley Pearson, Steve Pugh, and more. The books came in a standard format with a standard price: 128 pages for $9.99. Zoom launched in October 2018 with DC Super Hero Girls: Search for Atlantis by Shea Fontana.

=== Earth M ===
Earth M
- Status: Active
- Founded: 2020
- Publication types: Comics
- Fiction genres: Superheroes

Earth M is an imprint and a relaunch of the Milestone universe by DC and Milestone Media. Earth M was supposed to launch its first book in early 2018, but the first release featuring this reality was Milestone Returns #0 in September 2020. Milestone, Static Shock, Duo, Love Army and Earth M make up the entirety of that imprint.

=== Earth One ===
Earth One
- Status: Active
- Founded: 2009
- Publication types: Graphic novels
- Fiction genres: Superheroes

Earth One (EO) is a DC Comics graphic novel imprint that features a separate continuity from their main imprint. Founded in 2009, Earth One graphic novels feature re-imagined and modernized versions of the company's superhero characters from the DC Universe.

=== Elseworlds ===
Elseworlds
- Founded: 1989
- Publication types: Comics
- Fiction genres: Superhero alternative history

Elseworlds is DC Comics' superhero alternative history and non-canon imprint.

In November 1989, the first Elseworlds title, Gotham by Gaslight: An Alternative History of the Batman, was printed. The line became an imprint with October 1991's Batman: Holy Terror, as it was the first to carry the Elseworlds logo.

=== Helix ===
Helix
- Founded: July 1996
- Defunct: 1998
- Successor: Vertigo
- Key people: Stuart Moore (Sr. editor)
- Publication types: Comics
- Fiction genres: Science fiction

Helix was a science fiction imprint of DC Comics. It only lasted two years before being merged into DC's Vertigo imprint.

Originally, it was planned to be released in July 1996 with September cover dates as "Matrix", but to avoid comparison to the then-upcoming film The Matrix, the imprint was renamed "Helix". The imprint continued until 1998, when its "signature book" Transmetropolitan transferred to the Vertigo imprint. Additional Helix titles were later republished in collected editions under the Vertigo brand.

=== Impact Comics ===
Impact Comics
- Founded: 1991
- Defunct: 1993
- Successor: DC's Red Circle line
- Key people: Mike Gold (editor); Brian Augustyn; Paul Kupperberg; Jim Owsley
- Publication types: Comics
- Fiction genres: Superheroes

Impact Comics (also stylized !mpact Comics or Impact! Comics) was a superhero imprint for DC Comics using the Red Circle characters licensed from Archie Comics. The line was supposed to be a newsstand based line aimed at the younger readers within its own self-contained universe. The Comet, by creators Mark Waid and Tom Lyle, was the imprint's longest running title. The imprint was also supposed to be a training ground for new talent.

Impact was launched in July 1991 with several titles: Black Hood, The Fly, Jaguar, Comet, Legend of the Shield and The Web. In May 1992, the imprint got its first team title, The Crusaders, lasting eight issues. From October to December 1992, various titles were cancelled. The miniseries Crucible began in February 1993 by writers Mark Waid and Brian Augustyn and artist Joe Quesada and was an attempt to relaunch the line, but with sales still lagging, the imprint was instead cancelled.

=== Johnny DC ===
Johnny DC
- Founded: September 2004
- Founder: Joan Hilty (editor)
- Defunct: 2012
- Publication types: Comics
- Fiction genres: All ages cartoons

Johnny DC (later DC Entertainment) was DC's imprint for its all ages cartoon titles. Previously, Johnny DC was used in the Silver Age as a mascot for DC Comics.

DC started a Warner Bros. cartoon character line featuring Looney Tunes and Cartoon Network with the April 1994 issue of Looney Tunes. In September 2004, DC upgraded this line to a full imprint as Johnny DC for the November cover date. In the same month, the imprint added The Batman Strikes!, a comic based on the Cartoon Network series The Batman, and Cartoon Network Block Party, an anthology title. In September 2006, Krypto the Superdog comic was released based on the Cartoon Network series of the same name. Three new titles, Billy Batson and the Magic of Shazam!, Tiny Titans and Super Friends, were launched in August 2007 by coordinating editor Jann Jones. In February, Tiny Titans first issue was released, while in March the Super Friends title was relaunched, now based on the Mattel toyline of the same name. Supergirl: Cosmic Adventures in the Eighth Grade began in December 2008. The imprint was renamed DC Entertainment.

=== Minx ===
Minx
- Founded: 2007
- Defunct: 2008
- Distribution: Random House
- Key people: Karen Berger (SVP); Shelly Bond (editor)
- Publication types: Comics

Minx was an imprint of DC Comics graphic novels aimed at the young adult market, particularly teenage girls. The line was launched with The Plain Janes, the line's signature title. DC signed Alloy Media & Marketing to market the imprint with a $250,000 budget. Also, Minx was working with Book Sense to get the novels into independent bookstores. The Plain Janes was the only title to get a second volume before the imprint was shut down. (Note: Minx. page 9.) Random House, DC's bookstore distributor, could not get the line's books into the young adult fiction section at the major bookstores. The line was canceled in September 2008. The New York Four moved to Vertigo for its sequel, New York Five.

=== Paradox Press ===
Paradox Press
- Predecessor: Piranha Press
- Founded: 1994
- Defunct: 2001
- Key people: Andy Helfer (editor)
- Publication types: Comics
- Nonfiction topics: Mature

Paradox Press was DC's second mature readers imprint replacing Piranha Press in 1994. The Paradox imprint was shut down in 2001.

Paradox's first comic books, Big Book of Urban Legends, La Pacifica and Brooklyn Dreams, saw print in January 1995. In August 1996, Paradox began the reprinting of the Gon manga by Masashi Tanaka. Road to Perdition, published in April 1998, was later adapted into a motion picture. Paradox stopped releasing material with Gon on Safari in September 2000.

=== Piranha Press ===
Piranha Press
- Founded: 1989
- Defunct: 1994
- Successor: Paradox Press
- Key people: Mark Nevelow (editor)
- Publication types: Comics
- Nonfiction topics: Mature

Piranha Press was DC Comics' first mature readers imprint launched in 1989. The book establishing the imprint's tone was Beautiful Stories for Ugly Children (BSfUC), an anthology by Dave Louapre and Dan Sweetman. Piranha's best-selling (and most well-remembered) title was Why I Hate Saturn (which started Kyle Baker's solo career). Piranha was shut down in 1994 to be replaced by Paradox Press. The imprint was DC's first imprint that allowed creator-owned titles.

Piranha Press was announced in November 1987 with Mark Nevelow as its editor. In June 1989, the imprint's first titles hit the stands, BSfUC and ETC. 24 different titles saw print under the Piranha imprint. BSfUC lasted 30 issues, while most were one-shots or did not last for more than five issues. In December 1992, Prince: Alter Ego, based on the rock star Prince, hit the stands.

=== Tangent Comics ===
Tangent Comics
- Status: Inactive (since 2009)
- Founded: 1997
- Founder: Dan Jurgens (writer); Eddie Berganza (editor)
- Publication types: Comics
- Fiction genres: Superheroes

Tangent Comics was a DC Comics imprint that introduced the Tangent Universe, a new universe of superheroes, created by Dan Jurgens in 1997 based on alternative concepts for the regular DC superheroes.

The imprint published a series of 18 one-shots over two years starring the Tangent version of the major DC Universe characters. The first nine specials were published during December 1997's "skip-week", with the second nine for September 1998's skip-week. The one-shots were collected into two volumes published in January 2008. In 2006, the Tangent characters appeared in the regular DC Universe in Infinite Crisis in 2006, in Ion #9-10 in 2007 and then in Countdown to Final Crisis in 2007. A 12-issue maxiseries titled Tangent: Superman's Reign, written and drawn by Jurgens, ran from March 2008 to March 2009 and revisited the Tangent Universe 10 years later, both in reality and fiction.

- Superman is an African-American New York police officer named Harvey Dent who received psychic powers from experiments conducted on him by a top secret 'Big Brother' group called Nightwing.
- Tangent's Flash is a teenage celebrity and movie star named Lia Nelson who has the ability to move at the speed of light, fly, teleport, and create holograms.

=== Vertigo Comics ===
Vertigo Comics
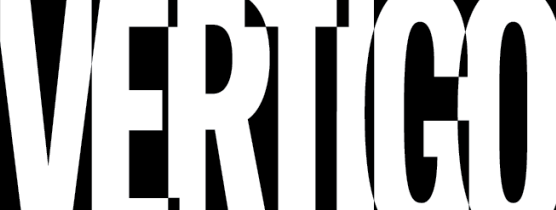
- Founded: 1993
- Key people: Hank Kanalz (SVP); Karen Berger; Shelly Bond; Mark Doyle
- Publication types: Comics
- Imprints: The Sandman Universe

Vertigo Comics is the alternative imprint of DC Comics.

In January 1993, DC's Vertigo imprint was launched with the Sandman and Swamp Thing groups of titles, plus Animal Man and Doom Patrol, all former DC Comics imprint titles plus Death: The High Cost of Living, a three-issue Sandman related miniseries, being the imprint's first new title. In February, several creator-owned titles begin printing with Vertigo from Disney's aborted Touchmark imprint starting with Enigma. Also, in October, the imprint had its first crossover storyline "The Children's Crusade", running through the Vertigo annuals with The Children's Crusade "book-end" series. In 1998, the Helix imprint closed down with its "signature book" Transmetropolitan transferred to the Vertigo imprint. Vertigo took over publishing collected editions for the Helix titles. Starting in January 1999, The Trenchcoat Brigade brought Phantom Stranger, John Constantine, Doctor Occult and Mr. E together in one series lasting four issues. Vertigo had its first fifth-week event in December 1999 to mark the change in the millennium with books named starting with "V2K". In May 2002, an ongoing title, Fables by Bill Willingham, revitalized the Vertigo line with stories updating old fairy tales. Other titles in the Fables franchise include Jack of Fables in 2006, The Literals in 2009 (part of the nine-issue storyline The Great Fables Crossover), Cinderella: From Fabletown with Love in 2010, and Fairest in 2012. In 2002, the imprint launched the Vertigo Pop: Tokyo title, lasting four issues and including some manga, and the successful Y: The Last Man lasting to January 2008 and 60 issues. After the September 2008 cancellation of the Minx line, Minx's The New York Four moved to Vertigo for its sequel, New York Five. In June 2009, Vertigo launched its first line in Vertigo Crime with Filthy Rich, followed by Dark Entries, both as black and white hardcovers. DC Universe characters returned to the DC imprint in July 2010, thus cancelling a title and effecting a proposed new Swamp Thing series. The same year, 100-page "Spectacular" reprints program began. By September, as part of DC Entertainment's reorganization, Vertigo joined its other DC imprints under the same Editor-in-Chief Bob Harris, while three Vertigo editors were later fired. Vertigo in 2011 released two one-shot multi-editor anthologies: Strange Adventures and The Unexpected.

In 2018, Neil Gaiman and Mark Doyle began to oversee a Sandman Universe imprint under the Vertigo banner.

The Vertigo branding was retired in January 2020, with most of its library transferred to its successor, DC Black Label. DC relaunched the Vertigo imprint in 2024.

=== WildStorm ===
WildStorm
- Founded: 1992
- Defunct: December 2010
- Successor: Digital comics division
- Publication types: Comics
- Fiction genres: Superheroes
- Imprints: America's Best Comics (Note: Wildstorm. Page 1.); Cliffhanger; Homage Comics

WildStorm was an imprint and subsidiary of DC Comics that was acquired that featured superheroes. The imprint was formerly a member studio of Image Comics.

In August 1998, DC purchased WildStorm including imprints Cliffhanger, Homage, and America's Best Comics with the imprints appearing under the DC banner in January 1999. In November 1999, the Star Trek comic book began publishing under WildStorm with a series of one-shots and miniseries. In September 2010, as part of DC Entertainment's reorganization, DC began to cancel the WildStorm imprint (with the December issues with two titles moving to the DC brand) and the WildStorm editorial staff relocated to DC's Los Angeles-based digital publishing division.

With DC's The New 52 reboot in September 2011, the WildStorm characters were integrated into the DC Universe with the Edge line of titles with a Stormwatch and Grifter title.

==== America's Best Comics ====
America's Best Comics
- Founded: 1999
- Founder: Alan Moore
- Defunct: 2010
- Key people: Alan Moore
- Publication types: Comics
- Fiction genres: Superheroes

America's Best Comics (ABC) was an imprint of WildStorm, originating before Wildstorm's purchase by DC comics in 1998. Alan Moore created the concepts of the line. The imprint published its first comic, The League of Extraordinary Gentlemen #1, in January 1999. Additional titles printed were Tom Strong, Promethea and Top 10. In April 1999, Tom Strong began its run. Moore became increasingly dissatisfied with DC, wrapping up the various series and moving League of Extraordinary Gentlemen to Top Shelf Productions and Knockabout Comics.

==== Cliffhanger ====
Cliffhanger was an imprint of WildStorm Productions for creator-owned projects.

In July 1998, the Cliffhanger comic Danger Girl was licensed out to New Line Cinema for a film adaptation. Cliffhanger merged with Homage to become "WildStorm Signature Series".

==== Homage Comics ====
Homage Comics was an imprint of WildStorm Productions for writer-creator owned comics.

WildStorm launched the Homage Comics in August 1996 with the relaunch of Kurt Busiek's Astro City, with Homage Comics published outside the Image Comics system. In August 1998, DC purchased WildStorm including imprints Cliffhanger, Homage and America's Best Comics with the imprints appearing under the DC banner in January 1999. Homage merged with Cliffhanger to become "WildStorm Signature Series".

Titles

- Kurt Busiek's Astro City
- Leave It to Chance by James Robinson and Paul Smith
- Strangers in Paradise by Terry Moore
- Red by Warren Ellis and Cully Hamner

=== Zuda Comics ===
Zuda Comics
- Founded: July 9, 2007
- Defunct: September 27, 2010
- Distribution: Web
- Publication types: Web comics

Zuda Comics was DC Comics' internet comics website/imprint starting in 2007. The site published all-new web comics and open submission policy for new creators. DC shuttered Zuda in 2010 as the company moved to only DC Comics digital releases instead of web comics.

Zuda Comics was later made as a free online site for original comics. The site was a competitive-based submission site where users could try to have their feature run the longest to qualify for a print collection. The first Zuda Comics winner, Jeremy Love's Bayou, was printed in April 2009.

As part of the DC Entertainment reorganization, DC ended the Zuda imprint in September 2010.

== Pop-up imprints ==
=== Wonder Comics ===
Wonder Comics
- Founded: 2018
- Defunct: 2021
- Key people: Brian Michael Bendis (curator)
- Publication types: Comics
- Fiction genres: Superheroes

Wonder Comics was a DC Comics curated imprint set in DC Universe continuity with a teen focus by the main contributor and curator being Brian Michael Bendis.

Bendis moved to DC in Autumn 2017. In addition to moving over his Jinxworld personal imprint to DC from Marvel, Bendis took over writing Superman and Action Comics and later became curator and contributor to a new imprint set in DC Universe continuity. DC revealed the name and titles of the imprint, Wonder Comics, in 2018. The line consisted of a Young Justice book written by Bendis with art from Patrick Gleason, Naomi by Bendis, David Walker and Jamal Campbell, Wonder Twins by Mark Russell with art by Stephen Byrne, and Dial H for Hero, which was written by Sam Humphries and drawn by Joe Quinones. Additionally the line introduced two new characters, Jinny Hex, a teenage descendant of the Western hero Jonah Hex, and Teen Lantern, a teen who manages to hack into a Green Lantern power battery.

=== Young Animal ===
Young Animal
- Founded: 2016
- Defunct: 2021
- Key people: Gerard Way; Jamie S. Rich
- Publication types: Comics
- Fiction genres: Superheroes

In 2016, DC teamed up with Gerard Way to launch a new "pop-up imprint" aimed at mature readers, called Young Animal, described as "comics for dangerous humans". The line was led by Doom Patrol in September, written by Way with art by Nick Derington. Way also co-wrote two other books, Mother Panic with Jody Houser, and Cave Carson Has a Cybernetic Eye, with Jon Rivera and Michael Avon Oeming. Mother Panic, which features art by Tommy Lee Edwards, is about a new Gotham vigilante who by day is the celebrity heiress Violet Page. The final series in the initial line-up was Shade the Changing Girl by Cecil Castellucci and Marley Zarcone, with covers by Becky Cloonan. All titles are edited by Jamie S. Rich. A crossover between Young Animal and the main DC Comics characters was released in 2018, titled Milk Wars. Other titles under this imprint include Bug: The Adventures of Forager (by Lee Allred, with art by Michael and Laura Allred), Cave Carson Has an Interstellar Eye (a follow-up to Cave Carson Has a Cybernetic Eye, by Jon Rivera and Michael Avon Oeming), Eternity Girl (by Magdalene Visaggio and Sonny Liew), Doom Patrol: Weight of the Worlds (by Gerard Way, with art by Jeremy Lambert and James Harvey), Collapser (by Mikey Way and Shaun Simon), Far Sector (by Nora Keita Jemisin and Jamal Campbell), and Shade, the Changing Woman (a follow-up to Shade, the Changing Girl).

== Planned imprints ==
=== The Killing Zone ===
The Killing Zone
- Founded: 2018
- Key people: Geoff Johns
- Publication types: Comics
- Fiction genres: Superheroes

The Killing Zone is planned pop-up imprint from DC Comics curated by Geoff Johns, formally announced at San Diego Comic-Con 2018. It was set to begin publishing in May 2019, but as of 2025 no titles under the imprint have been released or solicited.

== Lines ==
Lines of comic books are related comic books that do not necessarily have their own imprint. They may feature affiliated characters to a major character (Batman line), source of the characters (Red Circle), or other similarities.

DC lines currently includes Batman, Green Lantern, Edge, supernatural and young superheroes.

=== DC Archives Editions ===
DC Archives Editions
- Publication types: Comics
- Fiction genres: Reprints: superheroes, western, war

DC Archives Editions is a reprint line that collects DC Comics in hardcover multi-issue format.

=== Edge ===
Edge
- Founded: September 2011
- Publication types: Comics
- Fiction genres: Superheroes, western, war

Edge is a line of DC Comics books that includes the WildStorm characters.

With DC's New 52 reboot in September 2011, the Edge line of titles was launched with the Stormwatch and Grifter titles, the WildStorm characters integrated with the DC Universe, and the All-Star Western, Sgt. Rock and the Men of War, Deathstroke, Blackhawks, OMAC, Blue Beetle and Suicide Squad titles.

=== First Wave ===
First Wave
- Founded: 2009
- Defunct: 2011
- Key people: Karen Berger (editor); Shelly Bond
- Publication types: Comics
- Fiction genres: Pulp heroes

First Wave is the name of a separate DC Comics line of comic book featuring a fictional universe and a comic book limited series of the same name.

The universe was a melding of licensed pulp fiction characters with versions of established non-superpowered DC heroes. The comic book line was launched with a Batman/Doc Savage one-shot issue followed by the limited series and two continuing series. The limited series was six issues long, published in 2010 and written by Brian Azzarello, and drawn by Rags Morales featuring the main characters of the universe.

With DC's acquisition in 2009 to comic book rights for Doc Savage and the Spirit, among other pulp characters, DC co-publisher Dan DiDio and writer Brian Azzarello decided on a shared universe for these characters, then added established non-superpowered DC heroes to the mix.

The First Wave fictional universe is a part of the DC Multiverse and was launched in the Batman/Doc Savage one-shot, by writer Brian Azzarello with Phil Noto as artist. This was then followed by a First Wave six-issue limited series with art by Rags Morales with the first issue released in March 2010. The miniseries added additional characters, such as the Black Canary, the Blackhawks, Rima the Jungle Girl, the Avenger, the Spirit, and Doc Savage's group the Fabulous Five.

Two First Wave line ongoing series were then started: Doc Savage, by Paul Malmont as the first writer joined by artist Howard Porter, and The Spirit, by Mark Schultz as the first writer joined by artist Moritat.

Both of these titles also included back-up stories further showcasing the First Wave universe. Doc Savage's back-up was Justice Inc., starring the Avenger, while The Spirit had additional Spirit black-and-white short tales by various creators.

According to DiDio, The Shadow was originally intended to be part of the line, with the Shadow and Batman serving as "centerpiece", but DC was not able to use the character due to rights issues.

By February 2011, DC planned to cancel the line, although the Doc Savage and The Spirit titles were solicited as late as August 2011. DC listed a First Wave collection for a May 2012 release. Licenses for the non-DC characters the Spirit, Doc Savage and the Avenger ended prior to December 17, 2012.

=== Hanna-Barbera Beyond ===
Hanna-Barbera Beyond
- Founded: 2016
- Defunct: 2019
- Key people: Dan DiDio; Jim Lee
- Publication types: Comics

Hanna-Barbera Beyond was a DC Comics imprint that launched in 2016. Based on the characters from Hanna-Barbera animated shows, the imprint reimagined most of the studio's comedic characters and adapted them into darker and edgier settings.

The first four titles in the line were Future Quest, Scooby Apocalypse, The Flintstones and Wacky Raceland released in 2016. Other titles that were released in the following years include Future Quest Presents, Dastardly and Muttley, The Ruff and Reddy Show, The Jetsons, and Exit, Stage Left! The Snagglepuss Chronicles.

=== Red Circle ===
Red Circle
- Predecessor: Impact Comics
- Founded: 2009
- Defunct: 2011
- Key people: J. Michael Straczynski (writer)
- Publication types: Comics
- Fiction genres: Superheroes

Red Circle was a DC Comics line of comic books in the DC Universe featuring the Red Circle characters. The line was the second licensed attempt of DC to use these characters, the previous attempt being Impact Comics.

DC was granted the license to the Red Circle characters in 2008. DC planned to merge the characters into the DC Universe and tapped writer J. Michael Straczynski to write their introductory stories in the series The Brave and the Bold in 2009. The line was instead launched as a series of one-shots in August 2009. The Red Circle one-shots were followed in September by The Shield ongoing series with an Inferno back-up feature and The Web ongoing series with a Hangman back-up feature. Both titles folded after 10 issues, to be replaced by The Mighty Crusaders ongoing series which, by issue #3, was shortened to a six-issue miniseries. By July 2011, DC no longer had the rights to them.

=== The New Age of Heroes ===
The New Age of Heroes
- Founded: 2017
- Defunct: 2020
- Publication types: Comics

The New Age of DC Heroes, originally called Dark Matter, spun out of DC comics' 2017 event Dark Nights: Metal. This line introduced new characters and teams into the DC Universe. This line was headed up by DC Comics' master class with contributors such as Greg Capullo, Andy Kubert, Jim Lee and John Romita Jr. The Dark Multiverse concept is a fluxing reality responding to the viewer's subconscious fears.

The Dark Nights: Metal six-issue miniseries started in August 2017. The event introduced the Dark Multiverse concept and the Dark Knights, a villainous team that mixed Batman with other Justice League members. Dark Matter was initially announced to have five titles, but had two more added.

Titles

- The Silencer by Dan Abnett and John Romita Jr. (September 2017) - the story in which the world's most deadly assassin unretires due to her past returning to haunt her.
- Brimstone by Justin Jordan and Philip Tan
- The Terrifics by Jeff Lemire and Ivan Reis
- Damage
- Sideways
- New Challengers
- The Immortal Men
- The Unexpected

=== TSR ===
TSR
- Founded: August 1989
- Defunct: October 1991
- Publication types: Comics

TSR was a DC comic book line based on games licensed from TSR, Inc.

Dragonlance was first to be licensed and published with its first issue hitting the stands in August 1988. Additional titles followed with issue one of Advanced Dungeons & Dragons in October and Gammarauders in November. In July 1989, Forgotten Realms began publication. In October, Gammarauders was canceled with issue #10. An annual anthology, TSR Worlds #1, was launched in July 1990 with Spelljammer, beginning a 15 issues run the next month. In October 1991, the TSR license ended, bringing an end to the line with Advanced Dungeons & Dragons reaching issue #36.

== See also ==
- List of DC Comics imprint publications
