= The Flintstones (comics) =

The Flintstones is a comic series spun off from The Flintstones animated series. Various comic book publishers have created their own versions.

The 2016 comic book by DC Comics reimagines the 1960s Hanna-Barbera properties alongside Scooby Apocalypse, Wacky Raceland and Future Quest.

A new Flintstones comic from Dynamite Entertainment is currently in the works since 2023.

== Titles ==
Title	Start date	End date	Issues	Writer(s)	Artist(s)	Publisher
The Flintstones	December 1961	August 1962	#2-6 (issue #1 was released as Dell Giant issue #48)	—N/a	—N/a	Dell Comics
The Flintstones	October 1962	September 1970	#7-60 (continues the Dell Comics' series)	—N/a	—N/a	Gold Key Comics
The Flintstones and Pebbles	November 1970	February 1977	#1-50	—N/a	—N/a	Charlton Comics
Hanna-Barbera's The Flintstones	October 1977	February 1979	#1-9	—N/a	—N/a	Marvel Comics
The Flintstones 3-D	April 1987	February 1988	#1-4	—N/a	—N/a	Blackthorne Publishing
The Flintstone Kids	August 1987	April 1989	#1-11	—N/a	—N/a	Marvel Comics
The Flintstones (1992)	September 1992	June 1994	#1-13	—N/a	—N/a	Harvey Comics
The Flintstones (1995)	September 1995	May 1997	#1-22	—N/a	—N/a	Archie Comics
The Flintstones and the Jetsons	August 1997	May 1999	#1-21	—N/a	—N/a	DC Comics
The Flintstones (2016)	June 6, 2016	June 7, 2017	#1-12	Mark Russell	Steve Pugh; Chris Chuckry (colorist)	DC Comics

== Reception ==
The 2016 Flintstones comic has gained mostly positive critical reviews.
