= The Great Gazoo =

Fictional cartoon alien from the future, from The Flintstones cartoon series

- The Flintstones character
- The Great Gazoo
- First appearance: "The Great Gazoo" (1965)
- Last appearance: "Alien vs. Pebbles" (2021)
- Created by: Hanna-Barbera
- Voiced by: Harvey Korman (1965, 2000); Maurice LaMarche (1998); Seth MacFarlane (Family Guy, Seth MacFarlane's Cavalcade of Cartoon Comedy); Seth Green (Robot Chicken); Eric Bauza (Yabba-Dabba Dinosaurs); Flula Borg (Jellystone!); Frank Welker (Scooby-Doo, Where Are You Now!)
- Portrayed by: Alan Cumming (in The Flintstones in Viva Rock Vegas)

In-universe information
- Species: Zetoxian

The Great Gazoo, or simply Gazoo, is a fictional character from the animated series The Flintstones. He first appeared on the show on October 29, 1965. The Great Gazoo was voiced by Harvey Korman.

The voice of "The Great Gazoo", Harvey Korman from his first appearance.

== Fictional biography ==
The Great Gazoo is a tiny, green, floating scientist who was exiled to Earth from his home planet for inventing a Doomsday Device. Gazoo was discovered by Fred and Barney when his flying saucer crashed. Gazoo recognizes Fred and Barney's world as prehistoric Earth.

Gazoo refers to Fred and Barney as "dum-dums" and constantly causes problems for them. He can materialize and dematerialize objects, teleport, freeze time, travel through time, de-age anyone, destroy the world, and perform other remarkable feats. But when he attempts to help out Fred and Barney, he usually ends up causing even more trouble.

The only people who are able to see Gazoo are Fred, Barney and the children; animals also can see him. A running gag is that Fred argues with Gazoo while Wilma believes that he is talking to himself. Also when their daughter, Pebbles, says "Gazoo", Wilma thinks Pebbles is sneezing.

== Development ==
The creation of the Great Gazoo is attributed to writer Joanna Lee, who wrote more than 20 episodes of The Flintstones. He was based on Bill Moore, a design teacher from CalArts. The first draft of the episode that introduced the Great Gazoo was originally entitled "The Wizard of Ogg" and Gazoo's original name was "Professor Ogg". Other proposed names for Gazoo were Rip van Zonk, Hocus the Pocus, Dr. Puckwuck, and Shagelbextyzinkus (Ol' Shaggy for short). In her original character description, Lee described Gazoo as "a mirror, reflecting life's vicissitudes, vagaries, ritual magic and dreary reality. Simply, [Gazoo] is life, brought home to our two favorite life participants, Fred and Barney".

== Reception ==
Gazoo is considered by some to be an absurd character who alters the premise and dynamic of the show. Because the character is introduced into the show midway through the final season, he is often cited by fans and critics of the show as being an example of the show's having "jumped the shark". His obnoxious behavior is stated as another contributing factor to the show's cancellation. In all, Gazoo appeared in 11 episodes in 1965 and 1966.

== Other appearances ==
Apart from the original TV series, he appears in many commercials for Pebbles cereal like one where he sends Fred somewhere where he can have all the Cocoa Pebbles he wants only for Barney to be brought there as Gazoo quotes "I don't play favorites". One particular commercial for Fruity Pebbles in 1998 had him as part of a promotion for a contest where consumers would have to try to find each of the 10 boxes of all-orange cereal pieces after Gazoo had taken all the orange from Bedrock. The prize for any who found the all-orange cereal pieces would win a trip to Florida. In 2003, Gazoo had become the mascot for Marshmallow Mania Pebbles cereal. Gazoo is also a character in Flintstones vitamins, and a central character in the 1991 video game The Flintstones: The Rescue of Dino & Hoppy.

Ozmodiar, a Gazoo parody with a nearly identical design, appeared as a brief cameo gag in several episodes of The Simpsons.

In the 2000 film The Flintstones in Viva Rock Vegas, Gazoo (portrayed by Alan Cumming) is exiled to Earth by Gazaam the Mighty for his crazy hare-brained schemes. He then meets Fred and Barney after crashing near them, and begins to follow the duo for study; as always, Fred and Barney are the only ones who can see him. A running gag within the movie is his name mistakenly being pronounced as "Kazoo".

Gazoo makes a cameo in the Looney Tunes short titled "Attack of the Drones", where he attends Duck Dodgers' meeting with the other members in the space force about saving the Earth from obsessed eating alien monsters known as Eaters.

Gazoo appears in the 2016 DC Comics Hanna-Barbera Beyond series The Flintstones, where he is human-sized, does not float, and was sent by bookie aliens to evaluate the human race. In this version "Great Gazoo" is a title that roughly translates to "game warden".

Gazoo appears in the Yabba Dabba Dinosaurs episode "Alien vs. Pebbles", voiced by Eric Bauza. In this episode, he first appears disguised as a mysterious futuristic alien creature who zapped the dinosaurs with his bubble laser, only to transport them to his spaceship jail. Only at the end of the episode, he is revealed to be the "Great Gazoo" who only wanted to examine the prehistoric creatures.

Gazoo made a cameo appearance in the Animaniacs revival segment "Suffragette City".

He makes a cameo appearance in Space Jam: A New Legacy amongst the crowd of other Hanna-Barbera characters and several other Warner Brothers characters watching the basketball game between the Toon Squad and the Goon Squad. When the characters were making their way to the site of the game, the Great Gazoo was seen briefly teleporting away from Muttley. During the basketball game, Gazoo can be seen floating near the Flintstones and the Rubbles.

The Great Gazoo appears in Jellystone!, voiced by Flula Borg in a German accent. He appears in the episode "Gotta Kiss Them All" as the sociopath host of the virtual reality game "BuddyBlasters". The Great Gazoo becomes a regular character in season 2.

The character also makes a brief cameo appearance in the Scooby-Doo reunion special Scooby-Doo, Where Are You Now! that aired on The CW where he was voiced by Frank Welker. He was seen with Jabberjaw during the audition scene.

== See also ==
- My Favorite Martian
- 2001: A Space Odyssey
