= The Jetsons (comics) =

2017 DC Comics series by Jimmy Palmiotti

- Issue #1 cover

Publication information
- Publisher: DC Comics
- Schedule: Limited series
- Genre: Science fiction
- Publication date: November 2017 - April 2018
- No. of issues: 6
- Main character: The Jetsons

Creative team
- Written by: Jimmy Palmiotti
- Artist: Pier Brito

The Jetsons is a comic series based on the animated series of the same name. Various comic book publishers have created their own versions.

The 2017 comic book by DC Comics reimagines the 1960s Hanna Barbera properties alongside Scooby Apocalypse, Wacky Raceland, Future Quest, and The Flintstones.

This series was written by Jimmy Palmiotti and illustrated by Pier Brito, with the cover by Amanda Conner. The story takes place in an alternate continuity to the animated series, and centers on George and Jane trying to stop the course of a meteor heading towards their planet that will eradicate all human life. In this comic series, the origin of Rosie, the family's mechanical maid, is told, and she is revealed to be the mind of George's mother uploaded into a robotic shell.

== Publications ==
- The Jetsons #1 (2017-11-01)
- The Jetsons #2 (2017-12-06)
- The Jetsons #3 (2018-01-03)
- The Jetsons #4 (2018-02-07)
- The Jetsons #5 (2018-03-07): ROSIE to the RESCUE!
- The Jetsons #6 (2018-04-04)
- The Jetsons (2018-07-04): Includes #1-6.

== Reception ==
The 2017 comic gained a mostly positive reception from critics.
