= Wacky Raceland =

Comic book series

- Cover for Wacky Raceland #1 (May 2016), art by Leonardo Manco

Publication information
- Publisher: DC Comics
- Schedule: Monthly
- Format: Limited series
- Genre: Science fiction
- Publication date: May 2016 – December 2016
- No. of issues: 6
- Main character: List: Dick Dastardly and Muttley Penelope Pitstop Peter Perfect Professor Patrick "Pat" Pending The Ant Hill Mob Lazy Luke and Blubber Bear The Red Baron Rufus Ruffcut and Sawtooth Sergeant Blast and Private Meekly The Gruesome Twosome The Slag Brothers The Announcer

Creative team
- Written by: Ken Pontac
- Artist: Leonardo Manco
- Colorist: Mariana Sanzone
- Editor: Marie Javins

Collected editions
- Wacky Raceland: ISBN 9781401268275

Wacky Raceland is a comic book series that re-imagines the cast of Wacky Races competing in a desert wasteland, reminiscent of the Mad Max film series, full of obstacles, towards a single goal, Utopia, mankind's last safe haven. It is also one of four comic books introduced by DC Comics in 2016 as part of the comic book initiative Hanna-Barbera Beyond, along with Scooby Apocalypse, Future Quest and The Flintstones.

== Characters ==
- Dick Dastardly and Muttley are drivers of the Mean Machine and are known by the other racers for being the biggest cheaters in racing. Before the apocalypse, Dastardly was a world-renowned pianist called Richard D'Astardlien, who lost his wife and son due to his cowardice during a nanite attack. As for Muttley, he is a mutated and robotically enhanced dog whose intelligence and aggressiveness were slightly enhanced thanks to his exposure to the "SC-00-B2" serum, created in the Butcher Shop as one of the many projects overseen by Professor Pat Pending.
- Penelope Pitstop: Driver of the Compact Pussycat, Penelope Pitstop is a tough, no-nonsense young girl who takes no orders from anyone and sees herself as a strong and independent woman in a world where the strongest prevail. She has a close bond with her car, stating that they are full-time partners in the race, looking out for one another. Before the apocalypse, Penelope lived in the Greek island of Aegina, with her mother and her sister, who were killed by a tsunami that destroyed the island.
- Peter Perfect: Driver of the Turbo Terrific, Peter Perfect is seen by the other racers as Earth's last Boy Scout, mostly because of the way he acts, upholding the rules of chivalry. Unlike most of his fellow racers, Peter believes that even though the world has ended, it does not mean one should act and behave like a savage. A natural driver, he is also a bit of a scaredy-cat, trying to make a good impression in front of Penelope, whom he has a soft spot for.
- Professor Patrick "Pat" Pending: Driver of the Convert-a-Car, Professor Pat Pending is an erudite and slightly insane scientist who, in the past, was head of the projects and scientific experiments conducted in a private research facility called "the Butcher Shop". Among those experiments were some of the individuals that would later join the Wacky Race, as well as creations that caused the end of the world. With an insane yet brilliant mind at his disposal, he makes his job keeping the racers alive and secretly needs them to accomplish a goal that he set for himself a long time ago. It is revealed that he subliminally programmed the Announcer to create the Race (and the racers) so that he would have an army to destroy her.
- The Ant Hill Mob: Drivers of the Bulletproof Bomb, the Ant Hill Mob are a group of gangster-like albino midgets with a hive mind mentality composed of seven members, named I to VII, with V (pronounced Vee) as their leader. Although sharing a hive mind, the seven members of the Ant Hill Mob can think and act for themselves separately. They were part of an experiment conducted by Professor Pat Pending in the Butcher Shop, which manufactured them in a cloning facility in order to be used as cheap manpower for the military.
- Lazy Luke and Blubber Bear: Drivers of the Arkansas Chug-a-bug, Lazy Luke and Blubber Bear are a duo of hunters who lived up north. Having been friends ever since they were kids, they have always looked out for each other. Luke is an alcoholic who drinks in order to forget the horrors he sees (he carries around a map with the locations of all the bars in the Wasteland), while Blubber is half-human, half-bear as a result of the Announcer's surgery to piece him back together after a grizzly bear attacked the two friends, nearly killing him.
- The Red Baron: Driver of the Crimson Haybailer, Red is a narcissistic, homophobic sociopath with Nazi tendencies, always referring to his motherland and how Adolf Hitler was right about eradicating certain kinds of people off the face of the planet, while stating that he himself is the living proof of Germany's Master Race. Before he joined the Race, Red was a professional gambler, having ripped off some of the most powerful men and women in Las Vegas. He was also in love with the daughter of Las Vegas' most powerful man, the Colonel, who accidentally killed his daughter when she placed herself in front of a bullet meant for Red. He has a particular hatred for Sergeant Blast.
- Rufus Ruffcut and Sawtooth: Drivers of the Buzz Wagon, Rufus is a gay lumberjack who believes in the old saying that "bigger is better". As for Sawtooth, he is a small androgynous street urchin who fancies all kinds of knives and whom Rufus adopted as his protégé.
- Sergeant Blast and Private Meekly: Drivers of the Army Surplus Special, Sergeant Blast and Private Meekly are an unstoppable duo, familiarized with all sorts of military tactics and an amazing arsenal at their disposal. Sergeant Blast is a transgender woman and spends her time reminding the others that although she is transgender, that makes her no less worthy than anyone else. As for Private Meekly, he is a weapon enthusiast, who sticks around Sergeant Blast not because he fears her, but because he respects her.
- The Gruesome Twosome: Drivers of the Creepy Coupe, the Gruesome Twosome are a duo of freaks who resemble monsters, with Little Gruesome resembling a green-skinned vampire and Big Gruesome resembling a Frankenstein monster-type gladiator. Not much is known about them, except for the fact that Little Gruesome is able to control a swarm of bats that do his bidding, while Big Gruesome has incredible strength.
- The Slag Brothers: Drivers of the Boulder Mobile, the Slag Brothers are a couple of Neanderthals who were brought back to life through the experiments conducted by Professor Pat Pending in the Butcher Shop before escaping it. Although they were frozen in ice for thousands of years, both Rock and Gravel Slag are able to understand English and speak it through the use of caveman expressions, thanks to a series of brain surgeries conducted by Pat Pending. Having lived off the land in the past, the two men are incredible scavengers and hunters.
- The Announcer: The host of the Wacky Race, The Announcer turns out to be Professor Pat Pending's wife, Angelique Pending, who lost her body in an accident during the Slag Brothers' rampage through the Butcher Shop. In order to save her, Pat Pending removed her brain and placed it in a special container, which allowed her to live, but the lack of a physical body resulted in her going insane, unleashing an apocalyptic event on Earth, which turned it into a wasteland.

== Reception ==
Wacky Raceland has had generally favorable reviews, with critics praising the art as well as the story.

== See also ==
- Wacky Races
- Hanna-Barbera Beyond
