= Hanna-Barbera Beyond =

Comic book line by DC Comics

Publication information
- Publisher: DC Comics
- Publication date: May 18, 2016 – April 10, 2019

Creative team
- Written by: Various
- Artist: Various

Hanna-Barbera Beyond was a comic book initiative and a line started in 2016 by DC Comics that consisted of comic books based on various characters from the animation studio Hanna-Barbera.

== Publication history ==
Hanna-Barbera Beyond imprint was launched in 2016, after Dan DiDio and Jim Lee developed a partnership between Hanna-Barbera and DC Comics, both companies owned by Warner Bros. Discovery, in order to remake most of the studio's comedic characters and adapt them into darker and edgier settings.

The first four titles in the line are Future Quest, Scooby Apocalypse, The Flintstones, and Wacky Raceland that were released in 2016. Other titles that were released in the following years include Future Quest Presents, Dastardly and Muttley, The Ruff and Reddy Show, The Jetsons, and Exit, Stage Left! The Snagglepuss Chronicles.

== Titles ==
Title	Publication dates / Issues	Initial creative team	Notes / References
Future Quest	May 18, 2016 – May 10, 2017 (#1–12)	Writer; Jeff Parker; Artists; Ron Randall; Craig Rousseau; Steve Rude; Evan "Doc" Shaner	Crossover featuring characters from Jonny Quest, Space Ghost and Dino Boy, The Herculoids, Birdman and the Galaxy Trio, Frankenstein Jr. and The Impossibles, and Moby Dick and Mighty Mightor.
Scooby Apocalypse	May 25, 2016 – April 10, 2019 (#1–36)	Writers; J. M. DeMatteis; Keith Giffen; Jim Lee; Artists; Wellington Alves; Dale Eaglesham; Howard Porter	Based on Scooby-Doo, Where Are You!
The Flintstones	June 6, 2016 – June 6, 2017 (#1–12)	Writer; Mark Russell; Artist; Steve Pugh	Based on The Flintstones.
Wacky Raceland	June 8 – November 30, 2016 (#1–6)	Writer; Ken Pontac; Artist; Leonardo Manco	Based on Wacky Races.
Future Quest Presents	August 16, 2017 – July 18, 2018 (#1–12)	Writer; Jeff Parker; Artist; Ariel Olivetti	Continuation of Future Quest. Originally was going to be titled Future Quest Showcase.
Dastardly and Muttley	September 6, 2017 – February 7, 2018 (#1–6)	Writer; Garth Ennis; Artist; Mauricet	Based on Dastardly and Muttley in Their Flying Machines.
The Ruff and Reddy Show	October 25, 2017 – March 28, 2018 (#1–6)	Writer; Howard Chaykin; Artist; Mac Rey	Based on The Ruff and Reddy Show.
The Jetsons	November 1, 2017 – April 4, 2018 (#1–6)	Writer; Jimmy Palmiotti; Artist; Pier Brito	Based on The Jetsons.
Exit, Stage Left! The Snagglepuss Chronicles	January 3 – June 6, 2018 (#1–6)	Writer; Mark Russell; Artist; Mike Feehan	Featuring Snagglepuss from The Yogi Bear Show.

== Collected editions ==
Title	Material collected	Pages	Publication date	ISBN	Ref.
Scooby Apocalypse Vol. 1	Scooby Apocalypse #1–6	176	February 1, 2017	1-4012-6790-4	
Future Quest Vol. 1	Future Quest #1–6	176	February 15, 2017	1-4012-6807-2	
Wacky Raceland	Wacky Raceland #1–6	144	March 8, 2017	1-4012-6827-7	
The Flintstones Vol. 1	The Flintstones #1–6	160	March 22, 2017	1-4012-6837-4	
Scooby Apocalypse Vol. 2	Scooby Apocalypse #7–12	176	September 20, 2017	1-4012-6790-4	
DC Meets Hanna-Barbera	Booster Gold/The Flintstones #1, Suicide Squad/Banana Splits #1, Adam Strange/Future Quest #1, Green Lantern/Space Ghost #1	168	September 20, 2017	978-1-4012-7604-1	
Future Quest Vol. 2	Future Quest #7–12	144	October 3, 2017	978-1-4012-7391-0	
The Flintstones Vol. 2	The Flintstones #7–12	160	October 10, 2017	1-4012-7398-X	
Scooby Apocalypse Vol. 3	Scooby Apocalypse #13–18	160	February 13, 2018	978-1-4012-7748-2	
Future Quest Presents Vol. 1	Future Quest Presents #1–3, 5–7	160	May 8, 2017	978-1-4012-7830-4	
Dastardly and Muttley	Dastardly and Muttley #1–6	160	May 9, 2018	978-1-4012-7461-0	
The Ruff and Reddy Show	The Ruff and Reddy Show #1–6	168	June 19, 2018	978-1-4012-7498-6	
The Jetsons	The Jetsons #1–6, Booster Gold/The Flintstones #1	168	July 10, 2018	978-1-4012-8025-3	
Exit, Stage Left! The Snagglepuss Chronicles	Exit, Stage Left! The Snagglepuss Chronicles #1–6, Suicide Squad/Banana Splits #1	168	August 28, 2018	978-1-4012-7521-1	
Scooby Apocalypse Vol. 4	Scooby Apocalypse #19–25	160	September 25, 2018	978-1-4012-8445-9	
Future Quest Presents Vol. 2	Future Quest Presents #4, 8–12	160	December 18, 2018	978-1-4012-8542-5	
DC Meets Hanna-Barbera Vol. 2	The Flash/Speed Buggy #1, Super Sons/Dynomutt #1, Black Lightning/Hong Kong Phooey #1, Aquaman/Jabberjaw #1	168	December 19, 2018	978-1-4012-8628-6	
DC Meets Hanna-Barbera Vol. 3	Deathstroke/Yogi Bear #1, Green Lantern/Huckleberry Hound #1, Nightwing/Magilla Gorilla #1, Superman/Top Cat #1	168	August 6, 2019	978-1-4012-9130-3	
Scooby Apocalypse Vol. 5	Scooby Apocalypse #26–30	160	May 28, 2019	978-1-4012-8957-7	
Scooby Apocalypse Vol. 6	Scooby Apocalypse #31–36	158	January 21, 2020	978-1-4012-9546-2	
