= The Impossibles (TV series) =

American television series

- Title card
- Directed by: William Hanna; Joseph Barbera
- Starring: Paul Frees; Don Messick; Hal Smith
- Country of origin: United States
- No. of seasons: 1
- No. of episodes: 18

Production
- Producers: William Hanna; Joseph Barbera
- Running time: 6 minutes
- Production company: Hanna-Barbera Productions

Original release
- Network: CBS
- Release: September 10, 1966 – January 7, 1967

The Impossibles is a series of American animated cartoons produced by Hanna-Barbera in 1966 broadcast by CBS. The series of shorts (six minutes each) appeared as part of Frankenstein Jr. and The Impossibles.

== Setup ==
Posing as a trio of young rock 'n roll musicians, The Impossibles were actually crime fighters, with superpowers, dedicated to battling evil supervillains of all shapes and sizes. When performing for their adoring fans (usually star-struck, screaming teenyboppers), the lads would play their mod, futuristic-looking guitars atop an equally futuristic bandstand (emblazoned with their "Impossibles" logo on the side, a la Ringo Starr's drumkit) that could convert into a car (the "Impossi-Mobile"), or a jet (the "Impossi-Jet"), a speedboat, or even a submarine. Their standard catch cry when called into action was "Rally ho!"

Their humorous dialogue was typically peppered with puns. As with many Hanna-Barbera characters, the Impossibles were topical and inspired by the times, in this case resembling the rock 'n roll groups of the mid-Sixties.

== Songs ==
- Hey You Hiddy Hiddy Hoo
- She Couldn't Dance
- Little Sally Ann
- Meet Me at Caesar's Place
- Dance Dance Dance
- The Pussycat Walk

== Characters ==
=== The Impossibles ===
Each member of the Impossibles had a specific and visual superpower:

- Coil-Man (voiced by Hal Smith) - Coil-Man can transform his arms and legs into stretchable or coiled springs, allowing him to bounce to avoid attacks, deliver long-range punches, or drill through walls.
- Fluid-Man (voiced by Paul Frees) - Fluid-Man can transform part or all of his body into liquid. His liquid body allows him to vaporize himself into a cloud or storm, but also leaves him vulnerable to being soaked up by a sponge or frozen solid. Fluid-Man's costume resembles a lime green wetsuit, complete with diver's mask and swimfins.
- Multi-Man (voiced by Don Messick) - Multi-Man can create infinite duplicates of himself that are often destroyed, leaving only the original behind. His duplicates rarely, if ever, function independently, and are often used as camouflage, a bluff, or for extra strength or transportation. The character had shaggy orange hair that covered his eyes (his eyes, in fact, are never seen) and he usually holds a shield for apparently decorative reasons.

Each episode usually began with the villain pulling off an improbable caper while The Impossibles were busy performing across town. The team is called into action by their chief "Big D" (voiced by Paul Frees) and stop the villain before returning to finish their concert.

=== Villains ===
==== Recurring villains ====
- Spinner (voiced by Hal Smith) - Spinner has spider-based powers, specifically the ability to generate webs.
- Paper Doll Man (voiced by Don Messick) - Paper Doll Man is made of paper, allowing him to slip underneath locked doors or fold himself into paper airplanes for a quick getaway.
- Professor Stretch (voiced by Paul Frees) - Professor Stretch Super-stretchy with elasticity powers. He appeared twice. The first time was when he sabotaged a tank by using powder from a shaker that turns anything into rubber and in the end we see him used as a basketball. The second time was when he created a monster made of rubber cooking chowder.

==== One-off villains ====
- Beamatron (voiced by Hal Smith) - Beamatron can shoot laser beams from his fingers, although lasers had short battery lives. He owns a giant bat called Belfry.
- Bubbler (voiced by Don Messick) - Kidnaps the young Shah of Shishkabob (voiced by Ginny Tyler) by sealing him in an unbreakable bubble. The Bubbler has an undersea hideout at the bottom of the ocean.
  - Octavius - A giant attack octopus who guards Bubbler's undersea hideout.
- Burrower (voiced by Allan Melvin) - A villain who burrows under banks to pilfer the money inside.
  - Muddy (Hal Smith) - Burrower's henchman.
    - Curly (voiced by Don Messick) - Burrower's pet worm.
- Timeatron (voiced by Keye Luke) - A villain who uses a time cabinet to recruit historical figures. These villains include Captain Kidd (voiced by Paul Frees), Jesse James (voiced by Don Messick), and Goliath (voiced by Hal Smith). Timeatron goes to bring back Alexander the Great (voiced by Don Messick), but ends up trapped in his time when Multi-Man destroys the time cabinet with an ax.
- Smogula (voiced by Alan Reed) - Floats around in a rain cloud and wields a weather-controlling ray-gun.
- Sinister Speck (voiced by Hal Smith) - A thief who can shrink and grow at will. He was arrested after trying to hide in a police officers watch.
- Mother Gruesome (voiced by June Foray) - A witch-themed criminal who uses a machine that can bring villainous storybook characters to life like a giant and a dragon. She was eventually trapped in the same book as the giant, which was donated to a library.
  - Cromwell (voiced by Don Messick) - Mother Gruesome's pet crow.
- Fero (voiced by Don Messick) - A caricature of Nero, he is a fiddler who can send people and objects to anywhere he wishes with a high-tech violin.
- Dauber (voiced by Paul Winchell) - An artist who brings to life anything that he paints.
- Televisitron (voiced by Hal Smith) - A villain who uses a remote control to send his foes into various channels of the television to do them in.
- Aquator (voiced by Paul Winchell) - An aquatic villain who steals a formula for changing the size of organisms in an attempt to create an army of giant-sized micro-organisms.
- Devilish Dragster (voiced by Paul Winchell impersonating Boris Karloff) - A speedy car thief with who steals a diamond-encrusted car.
- Puzzler (voiced by Paul Frees) - A supervillain who can change shape as a living puzzle. He is the only villain given an origin as he mentions that he fell into a jigsaw-making machine which gave him his abilities.
- Satanic Surfer (voiced by Don Messick) - A villain who surfs and uses a remote-control ukulele, and an army of fish. He also has a Tiki Idol robot that can fire mind controlling rays.
- Sculptor (voiced by Lennie Weinrib) - A villain who carries a gun that fires quick-dry cement either turning people into statues or making instant rocks and walls. After his defeat, he is turned into a statue until he can be taken to court.
- Spraysol (voiced by Hal Smith) - A villain who sports a helmet that sprays liquid or gas. He also speaks with a lisp.
- Diamond Dazzler (voiced by Alan Reed) - A villain who steals a diamond that contains a genie (voiced by Hal Smith). He carries multiple magic gemstone rings with different abilities.
- Twister (voiced by Don Messick) - A villain who dresses like a top with a propeller beanie who steals by spinning like a twister. After his arrest, he is sentenced to community service, using his spinning ability to blow away the London fog.
- Cronella Critch (voiced by Janet Waldo) - A witch who robbed a charity-for-orphans party. She was turned into a cat due to a spell reversal by Multi-Man.
- Tapper (voiced by Hal Smith) - A villain who can travel through telephone wires with his weapon, the Deciminator, which he uses to send Coil Man to Ackbar the Martian (voiced by Don Messick) in his flying saucer and Multi Man to Captain Cutlass (voiced by Alan Reed) on his smuggling ship the Sea Serpent.
- Angler (voiced by Don Messick) - A villain who wears a torpedo-shaped fish suit that steals with a fishing rod.
- Ringmaster (voiced by Hal Smith) - A ringmaster-themed villain who has circus performers as his henchmen.
- Mr. Instant (voiced by Paul Frees) - A villain who carries a gun that can create anything in an instant.
- Dr. Futuro (voiced by Paul Frees) - A villain who travels from the 40th century to the 1960s to steal a gold brick to finance his crimes. He accidentally runs into an age-reversing machine and is turned into a baby.
- Clutcher (voiced by Don Messick) - A villain who created remote-controlled gloves for clutching anything at a distance.
- Mr. Ice (voiced by Hal Smith) - A villain who plans to conquer the city by freezing it.
  - Freezer Freezer (Don Messick) - Mr. Ice's henchman.
- Batter (voiced by Don Messick) - A baseball player-themed villain who bases his crimes on baseball.

==== Reformed villains ====
- Archer (voiced by Paul Frees) - A villain who dressed like Robin Hood. He later decided to become a musician upon his arrest.
- Inflator (voiced by Hal Smith) - A villain who attacks places with giant balloons that he creates using a special ray-gun. He has served his time and is now a balloon vendor selling his balloons to children. He claims his reason for villainy was due to monetary inflation.
- Billy the Kidder (voiced by Hal Smith) - A futuristic western outlaw who rides a robotic horse and intended to rob the Mint. After serving his time, he becomes a rodeo star, but remains uncomfortable riding actual horses.

== Episodes ==
| No. | Title | Original release date |
|---|---|---|
| 1a | "The Bubbler" | September 10, 1966 |
The Bubbler kidnaps the Shah of Shish-Ka-Bob and it's up to the Impossibles to rescue him.
| 1b | "The Spinner" | September 10, 1966 |
The Spinner steals a $1,000,000 tiara.
| 2a | "The Perilous Paper Doll" | September 17, 1966 |
The Paper Doll Man steals a top secret plan and is out to steal the second part.
| 2b | "Beamatron" | September 17, 1966 |
Beamatron steals a priceless painting from a ship.
| 3a | "The Burrower" | September 24, 1966 |
The Burrower uses his burrowing machine to steal half a million dollars from the bank and dig ten miles down to his lair.
| 3b | "Timeatron" | September 24, 1966 |
Timeatron uses his time cabinet to bring villains from the past to pillage for him.
| 4a | "Smogula" | October 1, 1966 |
Smogula freezes the Impossibles and seals them within a cave, so they will not interfere with his plans to conquer Empire City.
| 4b | "The Sinister Speck" | October 1, 1966 |
The Speck uses a formula to shrink himself in order to photograph top secret plans.
| 5a | "Fero, the Fiendish Fiddler" | October 8, 1966 |
To get the Impossibles out of the way, Fero uses his fiddle to transport them to different planets.
| 5b | "Mother Gruesome" | October 8, 1966 |
Mother Gruesome invents a machine that brings villainous storybook characters out of their stories to help her with her crimes.
| 6a | "Televisatron" | October 15, 1966 |
Televisatron transports the Impossibles to different television shows.
| 6b | "The Diabolical Dauber" | October 15, 1966 |
The Dauber uses a special brush where anything he paints becomes real.
| 7a | "Aquator" | October 22, 1966 |
Aquator has stolen a secret formula from a scientist who is friends with Big D and shrinks himself to microscopic size in order to get all the microscopic creatures to become large.
| 7b | "The Wretched Professor Stretch" | October 22, 1966 |
Professor Stretch causes havoc with his elastic abilities.
| 8a | "The Devilish Dragster" | October 29, 1966 |
The Dragster has stolen a valuable item.
| 8b | "The Return of the Spinner" | October 29, 1966 |
The Spinner returns and steals a priceless pooch.
| 9a | "Satanic Surfer" | November 5, 1966 |
The Surfer takes pictures of a top secret submarine.
| 9b | "The Puzzler" | November 5, 1966 |
The Puzzler steals top secret documents.
| 10a | "The Scheming Spraysol" | November 12, 1966 |
Spraysol steals top secret documents.
| 10b | "The Scurrilous Sculptor" | November 12, 1966 |
The Sculptor turns people into statues.
| 11a | "The Artful Archer" | November 19, 1966 |
The Archer steals a priceless violin and a million dollars.
| 11b | "The Insidious Inflator" | November 19, 1966 |
The Inflator creates giant balloon monsters to help him commit crimes.
| 12a | "The Dastardly Diamond Dazzler" | November 26, 1966 |
The Diamond Dazzler steals a precious diamond in order to awaken the genie within.
| 12b | "The Return of the Perilous Paperman" | November 26, 1966 |
The Paper Doll Man returns and causes trouble.
| 13a | "Cronella Critch the Tricky Witch" | December 3, 1966 |
A witch named Cronella Critch robs a charity for orphans party.
| 13b | "The Terrible Twister" | December 3, 1966 |
The Twister is stealing precious jewels.
| 14a | "Professor Stretch Bounces Back" | December 10, 1966 |
Professor Stretch returns and creates a rubber monster to help him.
| 14b | "The Terrifying Tapper" | December 10, 1966 |
The Tapper transmits himself over phone lines.
| 15a | "The Anxious Angler" | December 17, 1966 |
The Angler steals secret space research.
| 15b | "The Rascally Ringmaster" | December 17, 1966 |
The Ringmaster puts on a circus and robs from those who attend.
| 16a | "Billy the Kidder" | December 24, 1966 |
Billy the Kidder is a cowboy who rides a robotic horse and plans to rob the U.S. Mint.
| 16b | "The Fiendish Dr. Futuro" | December 24, 1966 |
Dr. Futuro comes from the 40th century to the twentieth century to steal a million dollar gold brick.
| 17a | "The Crafty Clutcher" | December 31, 1966 |
The Clutcher uses an invention that brings his gloves to life.
| 17b | "The Infamous Mr. Instant" | December 31, 1966 |
Mr. Instant uses his insta-gun that can make anything in an instant.
| 18a | "The Bizarre Batter" | January 7, 1967 |
The Batter kidnaps a baseball star and holds him for ransom.
| 18b | "The Not So Nice Mr. Ice" | January 7, 1967 |
Mr. Ice and his henchman Freezer Freezer freeze the city in order to take it over.

== Comic books ==
A single issue of a Frankenstein Jr. and the Impossibles comic was released by Gold Key as a tie-in to the TV series, and the contents were reprinted in The Impossibles Annual in 1968. "The Impossibles" comic story was titled "The Impossibles vs. The Mirror-Man". A new text-based story, specially written for the annual was "The Impossibles Cure a Doctor", with the villainous Herr Doktor Adolf von Tischklautz. Big D is mistakenly called "Big B" in this story.

In 2016, the Impossibles appeared as part of the cast of the Future Quest comic book, where the origin of their powers is explored; having been exposed to a special radiation, as part of an experiment by F.E.A.R., they gained their powers and became agents for Big D, who is depicted as female and named Deva Sumadi. They are also joined by a fourth member, a girl called Esme Santos who has control over magnetic fields, who nicknamed herself Cobalt Blue. Together, they fight against an alien being called Omnikron, who absorbs everything and everyone in its path.

== Adaptations ==
For the 1979 series The Super Globetrotters, the Impossibles' super powers were reassigned, entirely intact, to three members of the Globetrotters team. Coil Man was redesigned and renamed Spaghetti Man. Fluid Man was renamed Liquid Man. Multi Man was unchanged.

The Super Globetrotter costumes of Fluid Man/Liquid Man and of Multi Man remained the same as their Impossible counterparts (including the unexplained "F" on Liquid Man's wetsuit), except the color palettes were changed to match the Globetrotters' uniforms. The transformation sequences and many of the signature "moves" from the 1966 series were re-drawn, frame by frame, to feature the superhero incarnations of the Harlem Globetrotters basketball team instead of the guitar-toting Impossibles.
