= Muttley =

Fictional dog from Wacky Races cartoon

- Wacky Races character
- Muttley as seen in Dastardly and Muttley in Their Flying Machines
- First appearance: "See-Saw To Arkansas" (1968)
- Created by: Iwao Takamoto
- Voiced by: Don Messick (1968–1991, 2020; Scoob!, archival laugh recordings); Billy West (1997–present); Scott Innes (The Summer of Goodwill Passport); Daren Tillinger (Web Premiere Toons); Jeff Bergman (Boomerang UK bumper); Joe Alaskey (Duck Dodgers); Lewis MacLeod (Müller commercial); Terry Mynott (Dastardly and Muttley); Dana Snyder (Jellystone!)

In-universe information
- Species: Dog
- Gender: Male
- Relatives: Mumbly (cousin)
- Nationality: American

Muttley is a fictional dog created in 1968 by Hanna-Barbera Productions; he was originally voiced by Don Messick. He is the sidekick (and often foil) to the cartoon villain Dick Dastardly, and appeared with him in the 1968 television series Wacky Races and its 1969 spinoff, Dastardly and Muttley in Their Flying Machines. The character is known best for his mischievous, rasping laugh.

== Characterization ==
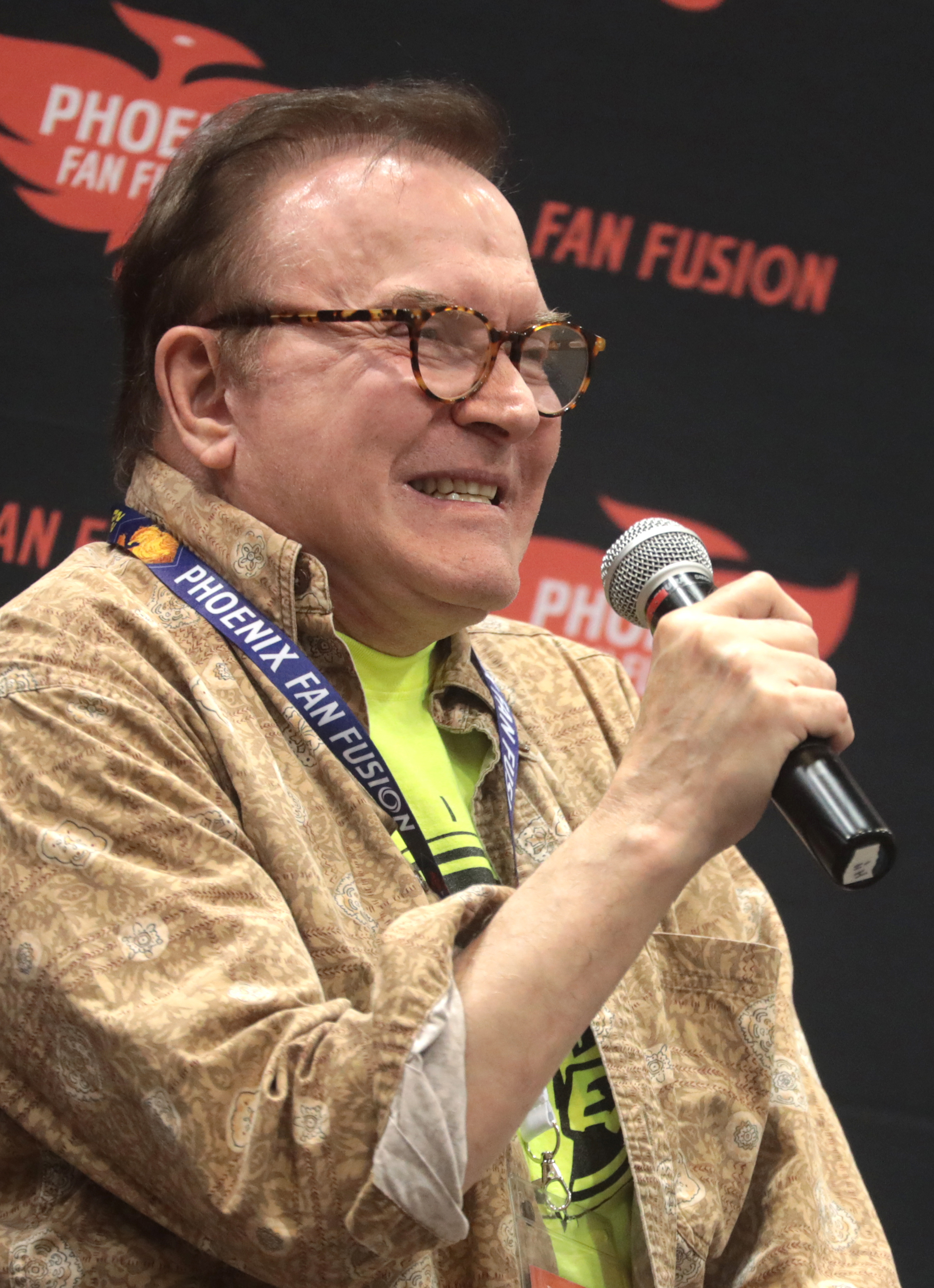
Billy West (pictured in 2022), Muttley's voice actor

Muttley first appeared in Wacky Races in 1968, as the sidekick of the accident-prone villain Dick Dastardly. While Dick was created as the equivalent of Professor Fate from the 1965 movie The Great Race, Muttley mirrored the film's character of Max Meen. Dastardly and Muttley were paired together in various later Hanna-Barbera series as bumbling villains.

As his name implies, Muttley is a mixed breed dog, identified in the Wacky Races segment "Dash to Delaware" as a mix of bloodhound, pointer, Airedale, and hunting dog. During Dastardly and Muttley in Their Flying Machines, in the episode Sappy Birthday, Muttley shows a calendar where April 16 is marked; his birthday. In an audio commentary for Dastardly and Muttley, the designers comment that they conceived of Muttley's shape as what a dog would look like if he were a tank-styled vacuum cleaner.

Muttley does not really talk; his main examples of speech are his trademark "wheezy snicker" (usually at Dick's expense, who sometimes retaliates by thumping him on the head) and a mushy, sotto voce grumble against an unsympathetic or harsh Dick (usually along the lines of "Snazza frazza rashin' fashin' Rick Rastardly!").

Don Messick had previously used Muttley's distinctive laugh in other Hanna-Barbara productions. In the Huckleberry Hound cartoons, Messick voiced a black-and-white dog who enjoyed antagonizing Huck the mailman, dog catcher, barbecuer, etc. Messick also used the same snickering chortle for "Snuggles", a mischievous dog who tormented Quick Draw McGraw; then for "Griswold" in an episode of Top Cat; then for "Mugger" appearing in the 1964 movie Hey There, It's Yogi Bear; and again for Precious Pupp in 1966. He also repurposed the characterization for Alexandra Cabot's cat Sebastian on Josie and the Pussycats in 1970.

Muttley (who turned from a "bluish hue" to a "dusty brown") wore only a collar in Wacky Races, but in Dastardly and Muttley in Their Flying Machines, he donned a World War I style aviator's cap and scarf, and served as a flying ace along with Dastardly and two other pilots as members of the "Vulture Squadron". In this spinoff, he also sported many medals and constantly demanded new ones from Dastardly for following his commands. Similarly, Dastardly frequently ripped medals off Muttley's chest as punishment for his incompetence. And it was upon joining Dastardly and Muttley in Their Flying Machines that Muttley gained the ability to fly in brief spurts by spinning his tail like a helicopter rotor blade.

Muttley also enjoyed his own short segment in the series Magnificent Muttley, where he would engage in Walter Mitty-style fantasies. The designers speculated that Muttley was popular that the producers wanted to give Muttley some time as a solo character.

== Muttley vs. Mumbly ==
Muttley is sometimes confused with the crime-fighting dog Mumbly from The Mumbly Cartoon Show, who has a similar appearance. Mumbly later appeared as the captain of the villainous Really Rottens in Laff-A-Lympics along with his accomplice, the Dread Baron, who resembles Dick Dastardly. The Dread Baron and Mumbly later appeared in the television film Yogi Bear and the Magical Flight of the Spruce Goose (1987). It is not certain why Mumbly was retconned as a villain, neither is it certain why he and Dread Baron were apparently used as substitutes for Dastardly and Muttley, especially in the Yogi Bear movie where Paul Winchell voiced the Baron instead of Dastardly (and in the scene where the Baron's crashed plane is shown, it is Dick's plane from Dastardly and Muttley in Their Flying Machines, complete with the "D" on the side). In that story, Mumbly had once utilized his tail to fly just like Muttley does in Dastardly and Muttley in Their Flying Machines. The reason most suggested is that the Wacky Races characters (including Dastardly and Muttley) were not fully owned by Hanna-Barbera as the show was a co-production with Heatter-Quigley Productions.

An early version of the Muttley/Mumbly character appears in the 1964 Hanna-Barbera feature film Hey There, It's Yogi Bear! This prototype Muttley ("Mugger") is a mean-spirited dog with a travelling circus who has a penchant for biting his owners on the leg. The character may also have been inspired by The Atom Ant Show's "Precious Pupp", who was known for laughing the same way.

== Other appearances ==
- Muttley and Dick Dastardly appear in Yogi's Treasure Hunt.
- Muttley appears in The Good, the Bad, and Huckleberry Hound (1988).
- Muttley and Dick Dastardly appear in Wake, Rattle, and Roll.
- A teenage version of Muttley appears in Yo Yogi!.
- Muttley appears in the Duck Dodgers episode "MMORPD", with vocal effects provided by Joe Alaskey.
- Muttley appears in Dynomutt, Dog Wonder.
- Muttley appears in the 2016 comic Wacky Raceland. This version is a rabid dog who was used in lab experiments conducted by Pat Pending and given robotic prosthetics. In the lab, Muttley was given the designation "SC-BB-02".
  - Another version of Muttley appears in Dastardly & Muttley, published by DC Comics under the Hanna-Barbera Beyond line. This version is Cpt. Dudley "Mutt" Muller, a United States Air Force navigator and partner of Lt. Col. Richard "Dick" Atcherly, who is fused with his pet dog by the mysterious element "unstabilium".
- Muttley appears in Wacky Races (2000), voiced by Billy West.
- Muttley appears in Scoob! (2020), voiced primarily by Billy West, with archival recordings of Don Messick being used for his laugh. In the film, Muttley was trapped in the underworld after an attempt by Dastardly to steal Alexander the Great's treasure from the Underworld through a dimensional portal serving as a back door. The plan backfired when the portal turns out to be one-way. Dastardly spent most of the film trying to save Muttley by going after the Skulls of Cerberus, ultimately succeeding.
- Muttley, based on the Scoob! incarnation, makes a cameo appearance in Space Jam: A New Legacy.
- Muttley appears in the third season of Jellystone!, voiced by Dana Snyder.

== See also ==
- List of Hanna-Barbera characters
