= Frankenstein Jr. and The Impossibles =

American animated TV series (1966)

- Title card
- Genre: Superhero; Science fiction
- Written by: Michael Maltese; Jack Hanrahan; Eddie Brandt; Phil Hahn
- Directed by: William Hanna; Joseph Barbera
- Starring: Dick Beals; Ted Cassidy; Paul Frees; Don Messick; Hal Smith; John Stephenson
- Country of origin: United States
- No. of seasons: 1
- No. of episodes: 18

Production
- Producers: William Hanna; Joseph Barbera
- Running time: 30 minutes
- Production company: Hanna-Barbera Productions

Original release
- Network: CBS
- Release: September 10, 1966 – January 7, 1967

Frankenstein Jr. and The Impossibles is an American animated television series produced by Hanna-Barbera Productions. It premiered on September 10, 1966 on CBS, and ran on Saturday mornings.

== Characters and overview ==
The program contained two segments, which each served as a middle ground between Hanna-Barbera's traditional early output and its superhero-based late-1960s cartoons. Each episode would feature two segments with The Impossibles, and Frankenstein Jr. in between.

- Frankenstein Jr.: Taking place in Civic City, boy scientist Buzz Conroy (voiced by Dick Beals) and his father Professor Conroy (voiced by John Stephenson) fight supervillains with the aid of a powerful heroic robot named "Frankenstein Jr." (voiced by Ted Cassidy). Buzz built "Frankie" and activated him through an energy ring. Frankenstein Jr. appears to be reminscient of the anime character Tetsujin 28-go (also known as Gigantor).
- The Impossibles: The title characters are a trio of superheroes (Multi-Man, Fluid-Man, and Coil-Man) who pose undercover as a Beatlesesque rock music band. The characters' names are descriptive of their powers: Multi-Man (voiced by Don Messick) can create identical copies of himself; Coil-Man (voiced by Hal Smith) can form into a super-springy coil; and Fluid-Man (voiced by Paul Frees) can transform his body into any fluid. The heroes receive assignments from "Big D" (also voiced by Frees), who contacts them via a receiver in the base of Coil-Man's left-handed guitar. During the development of the show, this group was called "The Incredibles," but was changed to "The Impossibles" by the time of production.

The show was one of several that were the target of complaints about violence in children's television in the late 1960s, and was pulled from reruns in 1968 (its initial run had already ended the previous year). The Frankenstein Jr. segments returned to television in the 1976 series Space Ghost and Frankenstein Jr., which aired on NBC from November 27, 1976 to September 3, 1977, replacing the canceled Big John, Little John.

== Voice cast ==
- Dick Beals as Buzz Conroy
- Ted Cassidy as Frankenstein Jr.
- John Stephenson as Professor Conroy
- Paul Frees as Fluid-Man, Big D
- Don Messick as Multi-Man
- Hal Smith as Coil-Man

== Episodes ==
=== Frankenstein Jr. ===
No.	Title	Original release date
1	"The Shocking Electrical Monster"	September 10, 1966
Dr. Shock uses his Master Mix Monster Machine to turn his assistant Igor into an electricity-absorbing monster.
2	"The Spyder Man"	September 17, 1966
Professor Conroy and Buzz unveil the blueprints for the Spy Detector XK-00-7 at a Maximum Security Building. Unfortunately, the blueprints are targeted by the Spyder Man.
3	"The Menace from the Wax Museum"	September 24, 1966
Upon an encounter with Buzz at the wax museum, Mr. Menace uses his monsters Godzonka, Gorillis and Cyclaws in an attack upon San Francisco.
4	"The Alien Brain from Outer Space, Part 1"	October 1, 1966
5	"The Alien Brain from Outer Space, Part 2"	October 8, 1966
A giant alien brain arrives on Earth and captures Buzz and Frankenstein Jr.
6	"UFO: Unidentified Fiendish Object"	October 15, 1966
The alien Zargon unleashes his warrior Destructo in his plans to conquer Earth.
7	"The Unearthly Plant Creatures"	October 22, 1966
Plant Man thaws the last three prehistoric plant creatures (consisting of the Carnivorous Chewer, the Creeping Crusher and the Fire-Breathing Snapdragon) from a glacier and then sprays them with his Obedience Ray in a plot to eliminate Buzz and Frankenstein Jr.
8	"The Deadly Living Images"	October 29, 1966
The Mad Inventor has invented the Double Identity Duplicator Projector to make copies of whatever pictures he inserts in it.
9	"The Colossal Junk Monster"	November 5, 1966
The Junk Man creates the Colossal Junk Monster in a plot to eliminate Frankenstein Jr.
10	"The Incredible Aqua-Monsters"	November 12, 1966
Buzz and Frankenstein Jr. guard the Navy's new Hydrotomic Submarine to prevent Dr. Hook and his aquatic monsters from stealing it.
11	"The Gigantic Ghastly Genie"	November 19, 1966
Zorbo the Great creates a genie and plans to use its three wishes in order to defeat Frankenstein Jr. and conquer the world.
12	"The Birdman"	November 26, 1966
Birdman and his robotic birds Vulturo, Rodantus, and King Condor abduct two astronauts and hold them for a ransom of $1,000,000.
13	"The Invasion of the Robot Creatures"	December 3, 1966
Sertano the Satellite King, an alien from Galaxy X, uses a gravity ray in order to get Earth to surrender. Buzz and Frankenstein Jr. must defeat Sertano's robots in order to defeat him.
14	"The Manchurian Menace"	December 10, 1966
The Manchurian Menace steals a Space Camera Capsule that has just returned with photos from Mars.
15	"The Mad Monster Maker"	December 17, 1966
To perform a crime wave in London, Baron Von Ghoul creates robotic versions of the horror movie monsters the Electroflying Firefly, the Menacing Mummy, and the Wicked Werewolf.
16	"The Monstermobile"	December 24, 1966
The Mad Inventor has invented the Monstermobile and uses its many gadgets to commit crimes.
17	"Pilfering Putty Monster"	December 31, 1966
Mr. Menace uses his putty monster to steal a $1,000,000 coin collection and even kidnaps Buzz. It is up to Frankenstein Jr. to rescue Buzz and defeat Mr. Menace.
18	"The Spooktaculars"	January 7, 1967
Dr. Spectro creates three giant ghoulish ghosts in order to take over Penciltrainia.

== Home media ==
On April 26, 2011, Warner Home Video (via the Warner Archive Collection) released Frankenstein Jr. and The Impossibles: The Complete Series on DVD in region 1 as part of their Hanna–Barbera Classics Collection. This is a Manufacture-on-Demand (MOD) release, available exclusively through Warner's online store and Amazon.com. A Blu-ray version of the complete series was released on January 28, 2025.

== Other appearances ==
- Buzz Conroy and Frankenstein Jr. appeared in the Yogi's Space Race episode "Race Through the Planet of the Monsters".
- Frankenstein Jr. appeared in the Johnny Bravo episode "Johnny Makeover".
- Frankenstein Jr. appeared in the 2013 film Scooby-Doo! Mask of the Blue Falcon.
- Frankenstein Jr. appeared on one of the Halloween parade floats in the 2020 film Happy Halloween, Scooby-Doo!
- Also in 2020, Frankenstein Jr. has a cameo in Scoob!, appearing in the end credits.
- Buzz Conroy and Frankenstein Jr. appear in the 2021 film Space Jam: A New Legacy. They are among the Warner Bros. 3000 Server-Verse inhabitants (which included other Hanna-Barbera characters) that watch the basketball game between the Tune Squad and the Goon Squad.
- Buzz Conroy appeared in the third season of Jellystone! Frankenstein Jr. will also appear in season 3.

== Adaptations ==
Archie Comics' Hanna-Barbera Presents #8 spoofing Marvel Comics' Fantastic Four #1

- A single issue of a Frankenstein Jr. and The Impossibles comic was released by Gold Key Comics in 1966 as a tie-in to the TV series, and the contents were reprinted in The Impossibles Annual by Atlas Publishing & Distributing Co. Ltd, UK in 1968. The two Frankenstein Jr. comic stories were titled "The Image Invasion" and "Frankenstein Jr. Meets the Flea Man". A new text-based story, specially written for the annual, was "A Spook in his Wheel". The character reappeared in the comic Hanna-Barbera Presents #8 published by Archie Comics in 1996. The front cover featured Frankenstein Jr. battling the Impossibles in an homage to the front cover of the original Fantastic Four #1 by Marvel Comics.
- A Big Little Book titled Frankenstein Jr.: The Menace of the Heartless Monster was published in 1968.
- The Impossibles' heroic identities were re-used for a later Hanna-Barbera production, The Super Globetrotters (which also featured a similar concept—in this case, the famous Harlem Globetrotters as undercover superheroes):
  - Nate Branch's heroic identity was alternately known as "Fluid Man" or "Liquid Man", with powers (and a flippered costume) similar to the Impossibles' Fluid-Man.
  - "Twiggy" Sanders became "Spaghetti Man", with coiling and stretching abilities similar to Coil-Man.
  - "Geese" Ausbie as "Multi Man" had virtually identical powers as his Impossibles counterpart and a similar costume.
- In 2016, Buzz and Frankenstein Jr. and The Impossibles played a major role in the DC Comics series Future Quest, that also featured characters from various animated series produced by Hanna-Barbera such as Jonny Quest, Space Ghost, The Herculoids, Birdman and the Galaxy Trio and Moby Dick and Mighty Mightor. In this series, the team gained a new female member named Cobalt and the character of Big D is a woman named Deva Sumadi who's also Falcon-7.

== See also ==
- List of works produced by Hanna-Barbera Productions
- List of Hanna-Barbera characters
