= Palm Key =

Island in Monroe County, Florida

- Palm Key Palm Key (the Caribbean)

Geography
- Location: Gulf of Mexico
- Coordinates: 25.092773°N 80.879795°W
- Archipelago: Florida Keys
- Adjacent to: Florida Straits

Administration
- United States
- State: Florida
- County: Monroe

Palm Key is an island located in Florida Bay near latitude 25°7'N, and longitude 80°53'W, or about 3 miles (4.8 km) southeast of the town of Flamingo, Florida, United States. Naval charts show it to be a small oval-shaped island approximately 0.5 miles (0.80 km) in length. While it is now apparently uninhabited it was once inhabited by fishermen. It is mentioned in Robert Louis Stevenson's Treasure Island.
