= Future Quest =

DC Comics crossover comic book series

- Cover for Future Quest #1 (May 2016), art by Evan Shaner

Publication information
- Schedule: Monthly
- Format: Limited series
- Genre: Superhero, science fiction
- Publication date: May 18, 2016 – May 10, 2017
- No. of issues: 12
- Main character: List: Jonny Quest Space Ghost The Herculoids Birdman Frankenstein Jr. The Impossibles Moby Dick Mighty Mightor

Creative team
- Written by: Jeff Parker
- Penciller: List: Evan Shaner Steve Rude Ron Randall Steve Lieber Ariel Olivetti
- Colorist: List: Jordie Bellaire Steve Buccellato Hi-Fi Design Verónica Gandini Ariel Olivetti
- Editor: Marie Javins

Collected editions
- Future Quest – Volume 1: ISBN 9781401268077

Future Quest is a crossover comic book series published by DC Comics, as part of the comic book initiative Hanna-Barbera Beyond. The series features characters from various animated series produced by Hanna-Barbera, such as Jonny Quest, Space Ghost, The Herculoids, Birdman and the Galaxy Trio, Frankenstein Jr. and The Impossibles and Moby Dick and Mighty Mightor.

== Premise ==
Official premise by DC Comics:

When the adventurous and inquisitive Jonny Quest and his adoptive brother Hadji make a startling discovery in the swamplands of Florida, they are pulled into an epic struggle between the Space Rangers and a dangerous villain who threatens the galaxy. Now it's up to the combined forces of Team Quest, Inter-Nation Security, Space Ghost, and a host of Hanna-Barbera's greatest action heroes to stop him and save their universe!

== Story ==
On a distant planet, an intergalactic police force known as the Space Force give their lives to stop a creature called Omnikron. There is one survivor, later revealed to be Space Ghost. In the swamplands of Palm Key, Florida, Doctor Quest is tracking mysterious phenomena such as unnatural storms, and glimpses into other areas of the galaxy known as vortexes. He is met by Inter-Nation Security representatives Ray Randall, and Deva Sumadi. Space Ghost's Phantom Cruiser unexpectedly crash lands, and Jonny Quest, Hadji, and Race Bannon are sent to investigate. A terrorist organization known as F.E.A.R., led by frequent Quest enemy Doctor Zin, appear in the swamplands, with the intention of recovering the cruiser and killing the Quest team. Race is shot down, and Jonny and Hadji are nearly captured, but escape with the help of a boy that introduces himself as Ty. Ray Randall reveals himself to be Birdman and rushes to the site. With the help of Race Bannon, they rescue Jonny, Hadji, Ty, an amnesiac girl from the ship, and a strange monkey. F.E.A.R. excavates the cruiser, recover a second survivor from the crash, and leave Palm Key.

Back at the Quest compound, Deva tells Ty it is safer he remain under Inter-Nation's protection, as he will now be a target of F.E.A.R. Soon, Team Quest, Birdman, Deva, Ty, the mysterious girl from the ship, and her pet monkey take off for Brazil, as Doctor Quest projects a large vortex will take place there. They arrive, and are met by Todd Messick, young adventurer whose parents mysteriously disappeared in the area they landed in, known as the "Lost Valley". They walk to an archeological excavation site which tells the legend of Mightor. They discover that F.E.A.R. arrived to the site first, led by mercenary Jezebel Jade. In the struggle, Mightor's club is discovered, and Ty grabs it, transforming him into Mightor. Ty's transformation gives the team the upper hand, leading F.E.A.R. to retreat, but Doctor Quest is captured by Jade.

Jonny, Hadji, Race, Deva, and the girl from the crash (who has remembered her name is Jan) leave the Lost Valley, and turn to old ally Doctor Linda Conroy, mother of Buzz Conroy, and builder of Frankenstein Jr. Meanwhile, Mightor begins training under Birdman. They are interrupted by the sudden appearance of Omnikron, and they become trapped in a vortex. Back at Doctor Conroy's lab, Doctor Conroy reveals her latest project, Gargantuan, her largest robot, built to handle cataclysmic situations without endangering human life. It has a body, but lacks the protocols to be considered artificial intelligence. Omnikron appears at the Hollywood Bowl, where the Impossibles are stationed by Inter-Nation. Deva, convinced the Impossibles are not prepared to face such a threat, takes off to California with Race Bannon and Doctor Conroy, instructing the kids to stay in the lab. The Impossibles prepare to face Omnikron, but just before it appears, it spits out a nearly-dead Space Ghost. Before falling unconscious, he instructs the Impossibles not to let Omnikron touch anyone.

Meanwhile, at the lab, Jan recovers her memory, and tells Jonny, Hadji, and Buzz that Omnikron is a massive intergalactic parasite that feeds off of life, and destroys entire ecosystems. She also tells them about the fallen Space Force, and that she is being trained by Space Ghost to be the next generation of the Space Force. They figure out that no one on Earth knows what they are up against, and that Omnikron would just feed off of any resistance. Jonny suggests activating Gargantuan, but it lacks protocols. Buzz comes to the solution of inputting Frankenstein Jr.'s brain into the body of Gargantuan. They merge the brain and body, and take off for California.

At the F.E.A.R. base, Doctor Quest is being held prisoner, but Doctor Zin admits he needs Doctor Quest to help him save the Earth from annihilation. Doctor Zin reveals he has been secretly controlling the F.E.A.R. leader, Number One, with mind control, and the boy he recovered from the crash site, was Jan's brother Jace. Jace warned Doctor Zin of the incoming threat, causing Zin to have a change of heart, wishing to have helped fight Omnikron, instead of using it. They are about to leave the F.E.A.R. base to join the fray in California, but Number One has overcome Zin's control and intends to use Zin and Quest to come up with a solution, and to auction it off when the world becomes desperate enough. Jezebel Jade betrays Number 1, and help Doctor Quest and Doctor Zin escape with the Phantom Cruiser. Jace regains consciousness, and tells them he needs to find his sister Jan.

The Impossibles struggle to keep civilians away from Omnikron, and soon the Phantom Cruiser arrives, and Space Ghost is placed in a healing chamber within the Cruiser. Frankenstein Jr., carrying Jonny, Hadji, and Jan also arrives to help fight off Omnikron. The odds turn even more in the heroes' favor when Birdman and Mightor escape from the vortex, joining the fight. The surviving Herculoids (who went missing fighting Omnikron weeks ago) also emerge from the vortex, but distrustful of robots, attack Frankenstein Jr. Omnikron flees to space via vortex, and Mightor follows it through the vortex thinking he could finish off Omnikron.

The heroes regroup at an Inter-Nation base, and formulate a plan to defeat Omnikron. Mightor, having relied on Birdman's power to guide the inside of a vortex, is unable to escape again. He is thrown 45 thousand years into the past, and meets the original Mightor. The original Mightor says he is happy that the club did not fall into the hands of the "Sky-god" (Omnikron), and teaches him to open a vortex to any location he is familiar with. Mightor uses his newfound power, and joins all the other heroes at the base. Tarra of the Herculoids expresses remorse and shame for ordering the Herculoids to attack Frankenstein Jr., but Doctor Conroy, impressed by the Herculoids' tactics, expresses gratitude in being able to improve on flaws the Herculoids exploited. Space Ghost, fully healed, reveals himself to have been spying on the other heroes to formulate a plan. Space Ghost, Birdman, and some of the Herculoids then attack the F.E.A.R. base Doctor Quest was being held at to recruit help.

In the Grand Canyon, one of the Herculoids, who has a telepathic connection to its cell twin that merged with Omnikron weeks ago, is able to pinpoint Omnikron's location. Multi-Man of the Impossibles creates the illusion of a massively clustered population in the Grand Canyon to bait Omnikron into returning to Earth. Mightor opens a vortex to Omnikron's location, and Birdman traces a path from that location to Multi-Man's illusion, and this causes Omnikron to take the bait and return to Earth in the Grand Canyon. The Impossibles and the Herculoids (both immune to Omnikron's absorption due to their bodies being more of an alloy) enter Omnikron, attempting to reach the core. The F.E.A.R. Spider-bots, Space Ghost, Race Bannon, Deva, and Frankenstein Jr. are fighting Omnikron from the outside. The Impossibles and the Herculoids reach the core, and launch a neuro-control device into the core, with Doctor Quest, Doctor Zin, and Doctor Conroy synced to the device shot into Omnikron's core. They were to keep Omnikron from escaping. Omnikron is able to psychologically overpower the scientists, so Jonny Quest and Hadji take it upon themselves to keep Omnikron from escaping. They too go through psychological challenges, but are able to boost each other's confidence, and take control of Omnikron. The heroes take advantage of this, and Mightor opens a vortex just outside Earth's atmosphere, and Space Ghost, Jan, and Jace fly through, and blast Omnikron into the Sun with the Phantom Cruiser. The heroes celebrate, and Birdman says the boys were able to take control by not holding onto psychological demons adults hang onto. Space Ghost returns to his galaxy to spread the good news, and rebuild the Space Force, while the Herculoids reunite with the others that did not go missing. On Earth, the other heroes have a party, and Ty asks Jonny and Hadji if he dreamed all this, and Jonny expresses his gratitude that he made new friends.

== Main characters ==
- Jonny Quest
- Space Ghost
- Dino Boy
- The Impossibles
- Birdman
- The Mighty Mightor
- The Herculoids
- The Galaxy Trio
- Buzz Conroy and Frankenstein Jr.

== Crossover ==
Future Quest also had a crossover with Adam Strange in Adam Strange/Future Quest Annual #1 in March 2017.

== Reception ==
Future Quest has had generally positive reviews.

== See also ==
- Hanna-Barbera Beyond
