= The Ruff and Reddy Show (comics) =

Comic book series written by Howard chaykin

- Trade paperback cover

Publication information
- Publisher: DC Comics
- Schedule: Monthly
- Publication date: October 25, 2017 – March 28, 2018
- No. of issues: 6
- Main character(s): Ruff and Reddy
- ISSN: 2691-0950

Creative team
- Written by: Howard Chaykin
- Artist(s): Mac Rey

Collected editions
- Paperback: ISBN 9781401274986

The Ruff and Reddy Show is a comic book series written by Howard Chaykin, with art by Mac Rey. Based on the animated series of the same name created by Hanna-Barbera, the series reimagines Ruff and Reddy as stand-up comedians in the 1950s. The first issue was published by DC Comics on October 25, 2017.

== Reception ==
According to review aggregator Comic Book Roundup, The Ruff and Reddy Show scored an average of 7.2/10 based on 24 reviews.
