= The Flintstones (2016 comic book) =

Comic book series

- Cover for The Flintstones #1 (June 2016), art by Steve Pugh

Publication information
- Publisher: DC Comics
- Schedule: Monthly
- Format: Limited series
- Genre: Prehistoric science fiction
- Publication date: June 6, 2016 – June 7, 2017
- No. of issues: 12
- Main character: The Flintstones

Creative team
- Written by: Mark Russell
- Artist: Steve Pugh
- Colorist: Chris Chuckry
- Editor: Marie Javins

The Flintstones is a comic book series based on the 1960–1966 animated sitcom created by Hanna-Barbera. The series was published by DC Comics as part of the Hanna-Barbera Beyond comic book initiative. The 12-issue limited series was written by Mark Russell and drawn by Steve Pugh, with the first issue published on June 6, 2016, and the twelfth and final issue published on June 7, 2017.

== Plot summary ==
The story takes place 100,000 years in the past in the town of Bedrock, one of the first civilizations to be established after tribes grew up with hunter-gatherers. Fred Flintstone is one of the top employees at the Slate Rock and Gravel Company, providing for his wife, Wilma, and his middle school daughter Pebbles. Wilma is an aspiring artist who primarily focuses on handprints to reflect upon her upbringing, while Pebbles is a relatively intelligent student with an interest in music and science.

Fred and his best friend, Barney Rubble, participated in the Bedrock Wars, where they and other soldiers were deceived by the conqueror, Mordok the Destroyer, into committing genocide against the Tree People and burning down their home to establish Bedrock. Barney and his wife Betty raised the infant sole survivor of the Tree People as their son, Bamm-Bamm. The "Loyal Order of Water Buffalos Lodge" from the original show is instead depicted as a veterans group the two attend to help them deal with the trauma of the ordeal.

=== Issues #1-4 ===
Fred's boss, George Slate, decides to hire a group of Neanderthals to work for him, believing they would bring some additional muscle for minimal cost. He tasks Fred with showing them around Bedrock and how to work to convince them to stay, promising that he would promote him to his foreman if he succeeds. He then hosts a party for them, during which one of the Neanderthals gets frozen in ice, and his body is displayed in a museum in the modern day. The Neanderthals turn down Slate's offer, dissatisfied with the job and Bedrock, costing Fred his promotion.

Wilma's paintings get accepted to be displayed at the Bedrock Museum of Art. When she and Fred attend the showing after Slate's party, she is dismayed to find it was put outside next to the restrooms, where it is ridiculed by art snobs. Wilma explains to Fred the significance of handprints to her tribe, giving Fred a deeper appreciation of her and her work.

After witnessing the first television broadcast, Fred and his family attend the grand opening of the Bedrock Mall and buy several animal appliances. He is overwhelmed by the number of appliances he and Wilma have purchased, leading him and Barney to become salesmen for a vitamin pyramid scheme to afford all of it. Wilma tells Fred she values human connection over material possessions and he should return anything that bothers him. When Fred gets store credit for one of his returns, he uses it to adopt a small purple dinosaur, which he names Dino.

Meanwhile, Reverend Tom, who leads the Church of Animism, attempts to get the people of Bedrock to worship different animals as gods, but they are dissuaded after finding out the animals used are appliances. Tom settles on getting them to believe on an invisible god named Gerald.

Bedrock is later visited by a group of green alien explorers, who record the territory for their database. A few days later, a large group of teenage members of the alien species arrive on vacation, and their reckless behavior turns into a full-on assault on the town's residents with their disintegration rays. With the help of her science teacher, Professor Carl Sargon, Pebbles reaches out to the aliens' parents to report their activities, while Fred, Barney, and their veteran friends fight them off until their superiors arrive. The aliens leave behind one of their top officers, The Great Gazoo, to oversee the development of the humans.

Afterwards, Fred and Wilma attend a marriage retreat hosted by Reverend Tom. With marriage being new in society, they and other couples are heavily discriminated against by several members of the community. At the retreat, tensions rise with Tom's explanations of marriage, with him irking Wilma by focusing on breeding and claiming the men are the bosses of the household. Tom is able to dissuade a group of protestors from attacking them by encouraging them to respect their choices, but he refuses to marry Fred's longtime friends Adam and Steve, and Fred stands up for them. Despite the retreat being disastrous, Fred and Wilma reaffirm their commitment to each other.

During the retreat, the animal appliances initially roam free believing the Flintstones have left, but once they see Dino is present, they get back into place realizing they are not permanently gone. Their elephant Vacuum Cleaner befriends Fred's armadillo Bowling Ball.

=== Issues #5-8 ===
In Bedrock's new mayoral election race, the incumbent mayor runs against Mordock's son, Clod the Destroyer, who campaigns on exterminating the Lizard People seemingly threatening their town. As Clod wins the election in a landslide, Fred and Barney reminisce over their time in the war against the Tree People and the atrocities they committed. Meanwhile, when Ralph attempts to bully his way to become the class president at Bedrock Middle School, Pebbles stands up to him and is elected by the class.

When Professor Sargon gets a grant to study moth breeding, he takes Pebbles and Bamm-Bamm in as his interns to avoid paying his assistant. As the moths get out of control, Sargon checks his astronomical projection abacus and seemingly discovers the Earth will be wiped out by an asteroid in three days, sending Bedrock's residents into an absolute panic. Pebbles tries to convince him to tell the town he was wrong to calm them down, only for him to discover one of the rocks on his abacus was two of the moths mating. He then claims the asteroid missed Earth and is punished by the town as he welcomes his assistant back.

Gazoo files a report to his base with a negative review of humanity, believing they have become too lazy and selfish at the top of the food chain and that it will not take long for them to die out. During his report, Reverend Tom informs Bedrock that they will go to Hell if they continue to misbehave, leading people to pay him to absolve them of their sins. While initially accepting their money, he stops when he sees George Slate attempt to pay him so he can shut down the rescue of one of his workers. Despite Slate's disregard for the worker's safety, Fred risks his life and rescues him.

Wilma and Betty fly out to meet Wilma's mother, Pearl Slaghoople, in the farmlands. When they were younger, Pearl discovered the benefits of farming and led their tribe out of their hunter-gatherer practices. The increased food production led to more children being produced, bringing the men in charge while the women looked after the kids. The tribe's leader and Pearl's lover, Thrak, attempted to marry Wilma off to a man named Jethro, leading her to run away. Wilma confronts her mother over not trying to stop her. Pearl reveals that she knew Thrak wouldn't let her go, so she let Wilma leave without saying anything to avoid her daughter being bound to the farm life like she was, leading the two to reconcile.

Pebbles and Bamm-Bamm learn about social economics from an eccentric Thorstone Pebblen, focusing on how men are the original leisure class. Clod attempts to convince the people of Bedrock to take money from the children's hospital to fund new armor for the dinosaurs to combat the Lizard People. Despite an endorsement from Stony Danza, he still fails to bring the women voters on his side. At the town hall, despite Fred's impassioned speech encouraging the townsfolk to focus on protecting their children, the men still vote to cut funding for the children's hospital in favor of the dinosaur armor.

=== Issues #9-12 ===
Bedrock's elite begin attending a new church focused on a snake-god named Vorp, which encourages displaying strength and might over helping the weak. This inspires Slate to fire all of his workers and replace them with less capable ones at a reduced payrate. Fred becomes depressed over losing his job, leading Wilma to buy him a new bowling ball and to recycle his previous one. Vacuum Cleaner leads the other appliances on a rescue mission to retrieve Bowling Ball from the recycling center. After retrieving him and freeing the other animals, the appliances kick Bowling Ball's replacement out of the house and disguise Bowling Ball as him. When Slate loses his girlfriend Cathy to Clod because he is richer and stronger, he realizes the importance of kindness and hires Fred and the other workers back.

Shortly after cinema is introduced to Bedrock, director Werner Herzrock decides to hire Wilma to work on the set for his upcoming project, impressed by her art. After seeing Fred and Barney go out to watch movies, Vacuum Cleaner decides to sneak out and watch one at the theater, during which a worker uses him to clean the overly dirty theater floors. As a result, he dies a few days later, devastating Bowling Ball and the other appliances.

Clod's war on the Lizard People is a bust due to the tribe leaving their station before they attacked. He then cuts funding for retirement to fund pterodactyl drones, but they attack Bedrock families instead. With Clod completely losing support of Bedrock's citizens, Wilma and Clod's assistant trick him into believing Herzrock's film set is his office while secretly putting their previous mayor back in charge.

For Fred's birthday, Barney builds him a statue of the two of them. Their newer neighbors file complaints over the statue, believing it promotes homosexuality, but Fred refuses to take it down to avoid upsetting Barney. They eventually build a wall over the Flintstone residence, and Fred finally agrees to dispose of it after Barney admits it's hideous.

Meanwhile, Gazoo is tasked with taking his planet's Neighborhood Association to Earth. To his horror, he finds out they destroy planets they deem too dangerous or unworthy to belong to their galaxy after scanning one individual from it. Gazoo is able to save Earth from being destroyed by selecting Dino as the test subject, as he's too innocent and unintelligent to be considered a threat.

In the series finale, Gazoo gives his final report on Earth. Despite his grievances, he believes it is too early to determine the fate of humanity after seeing the growth Bedrock has gone through during his stay. He and the other aliens have set up a decoy station around Earth to prevent future invasions. Pebbles questions the differences in science and religion by speaking with Professor Sargon and Reverend Tom. Sargon believes they should continue to pursue the truth behind the world even when their prior theories are proven wrong, and Tom informs her even if they do not know if gods like Gerald are real, the beliefs in deities help fill a void in their lives.

Slate has Fred join his bowling team against Cathy, promising him a promotion if he wins. While Fred helps Slate's team keep pace with Cathy, during the final bowl, Bowling Ball finally rebels from his pent-up rage following Vacuum Cleaner's death, costing them the game. Fred stores him in Barney's garage, where he befriends Barney's elephant Shop-Vac. Despite losing the bowling game, Slate still values Fred's work contributions and makes him his new foreman.

== Crossover ==
The Flintstones crossed over with Booster Gold in Booster Gold/The Flintstones Annual #1 in March 2017.

== Reception ==
The Flintstones comic has received positive critical reviews, with many praising it for its humor, characters, and political and social commentary. It was nominated for two Eisner Awards: Best Limited Series and Best Humor Publication and a Harvey Award for Book of the Year.
