= Marie Javins =

American comic book editor, comic book colorist, and travel writer

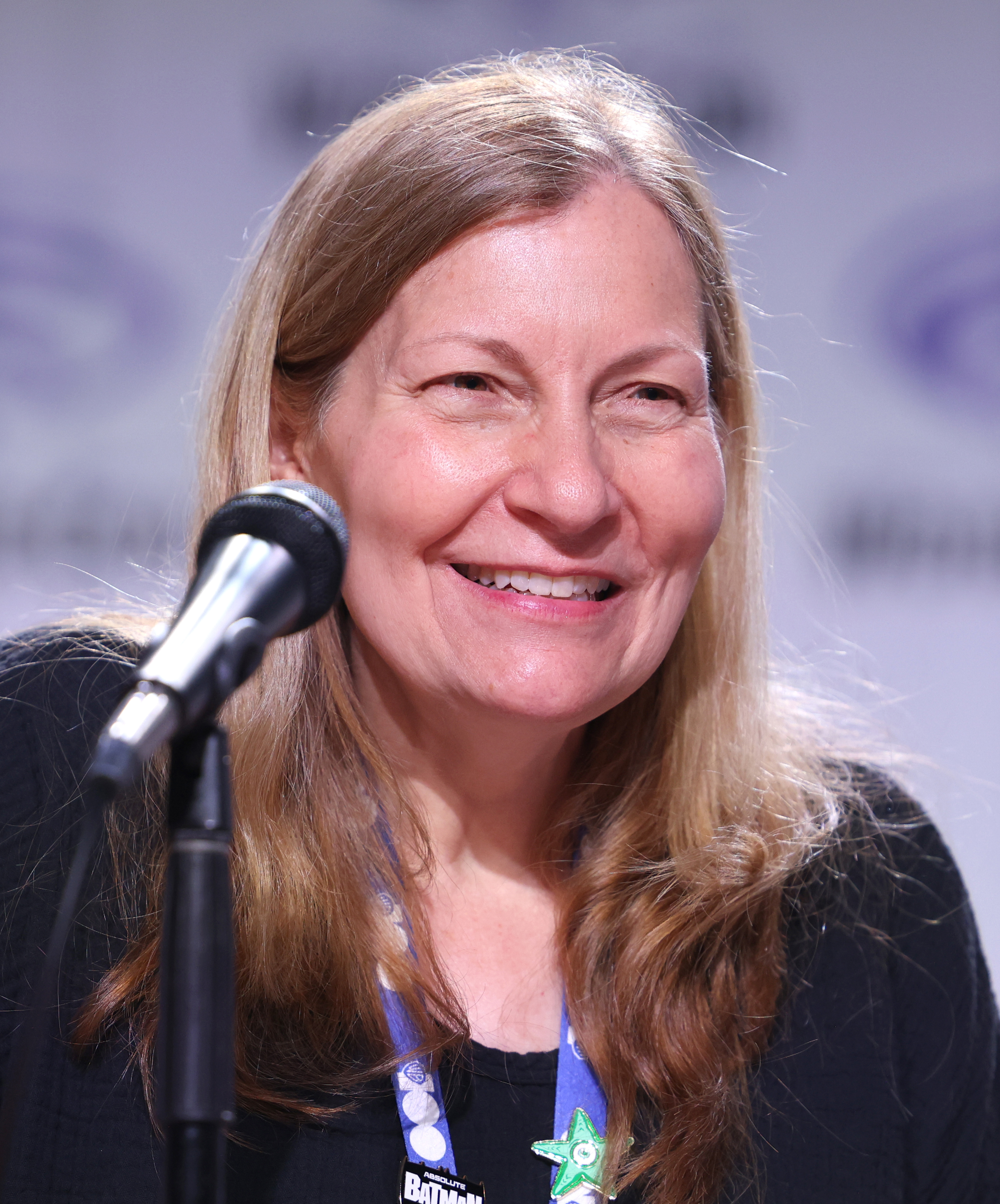
- Javins in 2025
- Areas: Writer, Editor, Colourist

Marie Javins (/ˈdʒeɪvɪnz/; born April 22, 1966) is an American comic book editor, comic book colorist, and travel writer known for her long association with Marvel Comics and the Teshkeel Media Group. Since 2020 she has been the editor-in-chief of DC Comics.

== Career ==
Javins attended Antioch College and interned at Marvel Comics and Epic Comics. After graduation, she was hired as an editorial assistant and secretary for Mark Gruenwald. Javins became a full editor at Marvel and Epic Comics in the early nineties, editing projects such as Akira, Groo, and Alex Ross's Earth X. She also colored more than 2,000 pages.

In 2001 Javins left Marvel to launch an around-the-world online project called MariesWorldTour.com. She circumnavigated the globe twice, documenting her journeys extensively.

She subsequently worked with the Teshkeel Media Group as the series editor of The 99.

After a shakeup at Warner Media in August 2020, she became the co-editor-in-chief, with Michele R. Wells, for DC Comics.

In November 2020, Javins was named sole editor-in-chief of DC Comics.

== Notes ==
Preceded by Bob Harras	Editor-in-Chief of DC Comics; 2020–present	Succeeded by current
