= Scooby Apocalypse =

Comic book series

- Cover for Scooby Apocalypse #1 (July 2016), art by Jim Lee & Alex Sinclair

Publication information
- Publisher: DC Comics
- Schedule: Monthly
- Format: Limited series
- Genre: Mystery, adventure, sci-fi, humor, superhero
- Publication date: May 2016 – April 2019
- No. of issues: 37 (36 numbered + Scooby Apocalypse/Hanna Barbera preview edition #1)
- Main character: Scooby-Doo

Creative team
- Written by: Keith Giffen; J. M. DeMatteis
- Pencillers: Howard Porter; Dale Eaglesham; Ron Wagner; Jan Duursema
- Inker: Andy Owens
- Colorist: Hi-Fi Design
- Editors: Brittany Holzherr; Marie Javins

Collected editions
- Volume 1: ISBN 978-1-4012-6790-2
- Volume 2: ISBN 978-1-4012-7373-6
- Volume 3: ISBN 978-1-4012-7748-2
- Volume 4: ISBN 978-1-4012-8445-9
- Volume 5: ISBN 978-1-4012-8957-7
- Volume 6: ISBN 978-1-4012-9546-2

Scooby Apocalypse is a monthly comic book series, published by DC Comics, which began in May 2016. It re-imagines the characters from the Scooby-Doo franchise, particularly the 1969 animated television series Scooby-Doo, Where Are You!, setting them in a post-apocalyptic world.

The comic was conceived by a DC Comics co-publisher and artist, Jim Lee, as part of a major reboot using Hanna-Barbera characters to create a new Hanna-Barbera comic-book universe. Lee worked on the first issue's cover and several more after that before interior artist Howard Porter took over.

The series ended in April 2019.

== Premise ==
"Those meddling kids" and their Mystery Machine are at the center of a well-meaning experiment gone wrong and they will need to bring all of their mystery solving skills to bear (along with plenty of Scooby Snacks) to find a cure for a world full of mutated creatures infected by a nanite virus that enhances their fears, terrors, and baser instincts.

== Plot ==
In the Nevada Desert, Daphne Blake, host of "Daphne Blake's Mysterious Mysteries" on the Knitting Channel, and Fred Jones, Daphne's best friend and cameraman, are waiting to meet up with a contact for their latest scoop: Doctor Velma Dinkley, who is one of the chief scientists in a private research facility known as the Complex. When Velma goes to meet the two from an underground entrance, Velma is accidentally attacked by Fred. Scooby-Doo, a subject prototype in the Complex's Smart Dog program, and Norville "Shaggy" Rogers, his trainer, are attending the Blazing Man Festival nearby, when Scooby is alerted to Velma's attack. Scooby and Shaggy go track Velma, and meet up with her, Daphne, and Fred. Velma decides to explain to Daphne why she called her to Nevada, and brings everyone into the Complex.

Velma explains that the people who founded the Complex (known as the Four) were working on a top-secret project known as Elysium. The project involved dispersing self-replicating nanites around the world. These nanites would "Transform Humanity", and help rid humans of their primal urges, such as violence and greed, and thereby creating a more peaceful world, one that would work toward the betterment of humanity overall. Velma, however, learned that the Four modified the nanites' code so that they would be able to control the humans, which is why she decided to reveal the truth.

While in the Complex's Safe Room, an alarm goes off, alerting Velma that the nanites have been activated on their own, when only the Four can activate them when they are all together in the Complex. After leaving the Safe Room, the group learn that the nanites have transformed the majority of the Complex's employees into monster-like creatures (nicknamed Beasties), killing and eating humans who have not transformed. After seeing what has happened, the group decides to flee. Shaggy remembers one scientist was working on an armored van designed for an apocalypse-like scenario, dubbed the Mystery Machine, which the group uses to flee the Complex.

While driving away from the Complex, Scooby and Shaggy notice the Blazing Man festival has been completely overrun with Beasties, meaning that the nanite plague was not just contained in one area, as hoped by Velma. The group finds a retail store, and use it for food and supplies, but while there, a horde of Beasties come by. Scooby is able to distract most of them, but Fred is attacked by one of the Beasties, breaking his leg. The group quickly stock up and head to a hospital nearby in order to fix Fred's leg. While there, Velma notices that some people who had some technology embedded in them were not affected by the plague. The group is able to get Fred's leg fixed up, while Velma is able to get a laptop to hack into the Complex's network and access its files.

Somewhere in California, the group is resting up, while Velma decides to run away, leaving a note that says "I'm sorry" on her laptop, which is open to her notes on Project Elysium. In her notes, Velma reveals that the Four were actually the Five. The Four were her four brothers, each who had been successful in their own field: Military, Politics, Science, and Business. Velma had also excelled in Science, gaining several doctorates in various fields, but was a social outcast. When the Complex was in process of being built, they had invited her into joining them, and turning the Four into the Five. Velma was the one who came up with Project Elysium and made it a reality. When Velma had released the final set of nanites in Paris, she discovered the truth about the Four going behind her back and changing the goals of Project Elysium, and decided to contact Daphne in the hopes of releasing her story, as her brothers' influence would be able to detect and shut down the story if it was coming from the mainstream media. Although her brothers modified her work, Velma blames herself for the plague. After discovering her notes, the group is able to track Velma down. Daphne, who had suspected Velma of hiding something from the beginning, forgives her.

With the group reunited, Velma suggests heading north to Dinkley Tower in Seattle, Washington, where her brother, Rufus Dinkley, resides. Velma knows that the Complex had several facilities, and that Dinkley Tower (or better yet, Rufus) may have the locations for the other facilities, in hopes of developing a cure. Meanwhile, Scooby is revealed to not be the only Smart Dog that survived the Complex. The pack of Smart Dogs, led by a small dog named Scrappy Doo, have been mostly ignored by the Beasties, but their cerebral implants have been malfunctioning. Scrappy's implants seems to be working the most, but he knows that his are deteriorating. In order for the pack to survive, they need to keep the human intellect they have gained, which means they need to find Velma to fix their implants. Scrappy realizes that he needs to become stronger if he and his pack want to live, so he activates some experimental nanotechnology embedded in his body, dramatically increasing his size and strength, and allowing him to walk on only his hind legs. While Scrappy and his pack track Velma, he finds a boy named Cliffy, who lost an arm and his family to the Beasties. Scrappy decides to bring Cliffy along with them.

As the group approaches Seattle and Dinkley Tower, they notice that for some reason, there have been almost no Beasties in sight. Velma believes that due to the nanites, the Beasties are working as a hive mind, and are migrating to some location. As they get closer, they notice that several cars on the road to Seattle have been abandoned, making it nearly impossible to drive there. Fred, still with an injured leg, is forced to stay in the Mystery Machine, while the rest head to Dinkley tower. As they approach, they see a wall of Beasties covering one side of the tower, appearing as a shrine to someone or something. Meanwhile, Rufus and his wife, Daisy, have been surviving in Dinkley Tower. Rufus' mind and memory has been slowly deteriorating, although he does not realize it, and when Daisy tries to point something out, he hits her. Rufus had two scientists, and tried to force them to figure out how to control the Beasties, but when they are not able to, he got enraged and beat them to death.

While Velma confronts her brother, Fred calls Shaggy, as he notices the Beasties have built a giant statue shaped like Rufus, and are climbing up the Tower. While Daisy believes that they should be safe thanks to the Tower's security system, Rufus reveals that he disabled it, as he believes the Beasties are here to worship him. The group, realizing that he has gone crazy, leaves the Tower, with Daisy joining them. As they escape, Rufus is last seen taken by the Beasties and placed into the statue, burned alive.

As the group move through Washington, Scooby tells Velma that he can hear a signal that's directing the Beasties to some location. As they follow the Beasties, they encounter Scrappy Doo and his pack, who tells them that he wants to kill Scooby and get Velma to fix his (and the pack's) implants, but Scrappy, Velma, Scooby Doo, and Cliffy encounter a group of Beasties, who attempt to attack them. Scrappy stays behind to defend them, as the others head back to the rest of the group and the Mystery Machine. While Scrappy survives, his pack does not. Scrappy finds out that the Beasties are coming together to form one giant being, controlled by a Beast with a rather intelligent mind. The being attempts to walk, but with a lack of structure, it fails. After hearing Velma's thoughts, the Mind Beast wants to add Velma to the giant, but Scrappy goes in to destroy the Mind Beast, with Scooby following behind. Scrappy defeats the Mind Beast, but the Beasties come back to consciousness. Shaggy is saved by Scrappy Doo, who gives the group time to escape. While they succeed in escaping, Scrappy is never found, upsetting Cliffy.

Sometime around Christmas Eve in Wisconsin, the group head to a place known as the Athena Center, which housed the Complex's cloud servers and backup data. Velma tries to gain information from the servers in hopes of finding a cure, but finds that it is hopeless for her to be able to do so.

As the group travels around the U.S. in order to survive the apocalypse, they find a mall in Albany, New York. Velma sees the mall and believes that it is the perfect place to start a survivor's camp/fortress. Using the city's sewers, they are able to get in, and find that every few hours, Beasties from two stores opposite of each other in the mall (CJ Nickel and MEARS) come out and fight each other, leaving a pile of Beast corpses in the mall. The group decides to shelter in the upper levels of the mall. As they do so, Daisy sets bombs near the stairs and escalators to prevent the Beasties from inside the mall from reaching them, while the group barricades the other entrances and exits, protecting them from the Beasties outside.

While the group waits for the warring Beastie factions to dwindle in size, Cliffy notices that every time they fight, both sides always have a large amount of Beasties that never seems to be shrinking. Velma comes to a conclusion that the Beasties may be breeding. Daphne and Fred decide to go to one of the stores, CJ Nickel, to check. Before they do so, Fred asks Daphne to marry him, and Daphne says yes, as they enter. The two go in and find a room full of eggs, where the Beasties are growing. Daphne shoots at the eggs, killing nearly all of them. When they look outside the room, they find that the matured Beasties are all dead, likely due to a psychic link between the children and the parents. One egg hatches however, and the beast mortally wounds Fred before Daphne can kill it. Daphne goes back to the group, and they mourn Fred's death.

Six months later, the Hudson Mall has been turned into Jonestown, a shelter for the humans who survived the nanite plague, named after Fred. Velma is currently the leader of Jonestown, and has been dating Shaggy for some time. Daisy has become a mother of sorts to Cliffy. Daphne, meanwhile, has become distant and vengeful since Fred's death (six months prior, when the group went back to CJ Nickel after Fred's death, his body was found missing, and was presumed to have been taken by the Beasties). Scrappy Doo is revealed to have survived, and his implants are now functioning again. Scrappy becomes a citizen of Jonestown, and joins Daphne on her hunts.

While some citizens of Jonestown rescue a few survivors, they find Fred, who appears to be in a zombified state, approaching them. They shoot him and report back to Velma, who believes it is best not to tell Daphne at this time. A day later, Scooby accidentally shocks himself while Daisy is fixing an electrical grid. Surprisingly, the electric shock fixes Scooby's implants, causing him to speak with a fully intellectual mind, rather than his usual limited vocabulary. Daphne laughs at this surprise, and the others join in (although Scooby does not find it amusing). Daphne apologizes, as there have been few times in their lives to laugh since Fred died. Upon saying this, she notices an uneasy silence in the room. Velma decides to come clean about Fred's return as a zombie. Daphne decides to blow off some steam by going hunting with Scrappy.

Some time after hunting for Beasties, Scrappy and Daphne decide to take a rest. While Scrappy sleeps, Daphne contemplates suicide, as she wishes to join Fred in death. Before she pulls the trigger, Zombie Fred approaches with a group of Beasties. Scrappy sees this, and tries to help Daphne with dealing with the Beasties, but Daphne (as well a mysterious stranger Scrappy seems to be working with) tells Scrappy to head to Jonestown to get backup. As Scrappy heads back, the stranger tells him to trust him, and also tells Scrappy that he is heading to Albany. It is revealed that Rufus is alive, and is with the stranger, who is revealed to be another of Velma's brothers, Quentin Dinkley.

At Jonestown, Cliffy tries to cope with Scooby's new intelligence, as he feels that he will lose him, just as he has lost his friends and family in the apocalypse. Scooby promises that will not happen. Meanwhile, Shaggy has noticed that Velma has been behaving erratically, even going back to calling him "Norville", which she knows that Shaggy hates. Shaggy confronts her, and she admits that she is now pregnant. While Shaggy is ecstatic, the celebration is cut short when Scrappy comes back and tells them that Zombie Fred has kidnapped Daphne.

Fred tries to get Daphne to listen to her, but she refuses, as she does not believe that she is talking to the real Fred, who tries to explain that the nanites have chosen him as an avatar to represent their voices, but she does not listen to him. Daphne is able to escape from Fred and his Beasties just as the group come by with the Mystery Machine. As they are heading back, Fred stands in front of the way. Daphne tells Shaggy to run him over, but Shaggy refuses, braking just before touching Fred, who gets on his knees and surrenders. As the gang approaches, a helicopter arrives, carrying Velma's brothers, Quentin and a severely burned Rufus. Quentin says he will explain, but shoots Fred's head off first.

The Nanites re-attach Fred's head back onto his body. Quentin explains he did that so that the group would lose any emotional attachment. Fred offers to explain, and the group takes Quentin, Rufus, and Fred back to Jonestown. Scrappy explains to Scooby that after fighting off the Beasties in Washington, he had been struggling to survive and recover, going from place to place to rest and get food. His implants were starting to fail, and he was losing intelligence, making it harder for him to survive. Eventually, he found himself in Sacramento, surrounded by Beasties. As all hope was lost, a drone came by and took out the Beasties. Scrappy followed the drone to the Beta Complex, which was housing Quentin and some scientists. Quentin healed Scrappy and fixed his implants. After he had fully recovered, Quentin requested Scrappy to head to Jonestown and give reports. Velma talks to Quentin in her office, where Quentin explains that Rufus survived due to a vaccine made to counteract the nanites. Outside Velma's office, Rufus sees Daisy. Rufus tries to follow her and tell Daisy that he loves her, but a pair of guards stop him. Daisy feels traumatized, and Shaggy comforts her. Meanwhile, Daphne has Fred kept in a room, surrounded with guns trained on him. Fred keeps trying to get her to believe that it is him, but she does not. A group of guards report to Daphne that the Beasties outside seem to be acting up, as if they are working together in an intelligent manner. Daphne immediately accuses Fred of controlling these Beasties. Fred claims that it is not him, then reacts, and tells them that the Nanite King has arrived.

Fred explains how the nanites had developed into two factions: the first one believed that humans were beyond redemption, and that they should extinguish human life, turning most humans into Beasties, and a second faction, a smaller group that now resides in Fred, believed that the world can be saved by combining humans and nanites together. The first group created a body of nanites to lead the Beasties, calling itself the Nanite King. The Beasties that are currently surrounding the mall is being led by the King. Fred asks to fuse his nanites with everyone, but Daphne says that they have survived thus far without the nanites' help. Meanwhile, Quentin explains that the vaccine was a potential cure that was still in its experimental stages, but Rufus took it anyway. Rufus, like most inhabitants of Jonestown, had a biological immunity to the nanites, but while the vaccine helped prevent dying from the fire, it was destroying him, making him mentally unstable, as Daisy and the others had seen when they last saw him in Seattle.

Before they can discuss any further, the Beasties start attacking from the roof and start killing the inhabitants in the upper levels of the mall. Daisy activates the bombs she set near the upper levels to slow them down. When a Beastie comes close to Daisy, Rufus protects her. As they get overwhelmed, Fred releases the nanites from his body to take out all the Beasties in the mall at once, but the Nanite King retaliates by using his own nanites to destroy the mall. Daphne, Velma, Shaggy, Scooby, Daisy, Cliffy, Scrappy, Quentin, and Rufus all manage to survive by hiding in the sewers, along with a handful of Jonestown citizens. After reaching the surface, a jet comes by to pick everyone up and take them to Complex Beta. An excited Velma states that with the technological advancements that surpass the Nevada Complex, and with the information of the experimental vaccine Quentin used on Rufus, she can make a cure.

While Velma starts working on a cure, the Nanite King comes to Velma, referring to her as the Nanites' "mother". Because she created them, the Nanite King gives her an offer: a chance for her and her unborn child to join them. The Nanite King gives her three days to consider, or they will attack, and kill her with all the other humans. Rufus' cell structure becomes unstable and he dies, surrounded by Daisy, Quentin and Velma. Before he dies, Rufus tells Velma that he is sorry for everything.

Three days later, while everyone is sleeping at night, the Nanite King approaches Velma to know her decision. Velma offers to go with the Nanite King, as long as the nanites do not hurt anyone else. The Nanite King refuses. Daphne and Shaggy attack the Nanite King, while Fred sneaks up and merges its nanites with the Nanite King. Fred explains that Velma gave him a virus to disable the nanites. With all the nanites destroyed, there is nothing keeping Fred alive anymore. As he dies again, he tells Daphne he loves her.

In the following months, the effects of the nanite plague started to decrease. Some of the Beasties reverted to their human forms, and eventually regained their intelligence, while others were immune to the cure. Despite it, humanity was able to start rebuilding civilization. The story ends with Velma giving birth to a baby boy: Frederick Rufus Rogers-Dinkley. Shaggy and Velma name Daphne (now living with a still-alive Scrappy) as Frederick's godmother and Scooby-Doo as his godfather.

== Characters ==
=== Main characters ===
- Scoobert "Scooby" Doo is a "Smart Dog" prototype, who is able to talk like a human being, thanks to a chip that was implanted in his cerebral cortex. This enables him to communicate with others, either by words or through the use of a pair of emoji-goggles. Unlike his cartoon counterpart, Scooby is quite brave and is not afraid of anything that stands in his way. His original name was 24062, having been named Scooby-Doo by Shaggy himself.
- Frederick "Fred" Jones was the doting cameraman of Daphne Blake's Mysterious Mysteries, hosted by his long-time friend, Daphne Blake.
- Daphne Blake was a budding journalist who came from a wealthy family. Her career plummeted after she failed to expose a story she had been working on for almost a year. After that, she was lucky to get a slot on the Knitting Channel, hosting Daphne Blake's Mysterious Mysteries, which further contributed to her being seen by her peers as a laughing stock. As a journalist, she feels compelled to finding the truth, no matter what the cost. Known for being extremely distrustful, she has a sharp tongue and a sarcastic vein. Still, under a tough shell, Daphne is shown to be very caring and fearful for the well-being of everyone in the gang, especially Fred, for whom she has a soft spot for.
- Norville "Shaggy" Rogers, nicknamed Shaggy by his friends, was a dog handler in the Nevada Complex, where he was responsible for the treatment and training of the "Smart Dog" prototypes. On his first day on the job, he saved Scooby-Doo from being ripped to pieces by the other prototypes, making it his mission to show the Great Dane how to defend himself against the others. Later, this earned him the canine's loyalty and friendship. Normally, Shaggy is laid-back and is always hungry. He defends his philosophy of life, in which a person must be open-minded to the universe and to what the universe throws at people. He also believes in numerous gods and deities and is superstitious. Still, in moments of tension, he is the one that tries to keep the peace between the gang, reminding them that, in order to survive, they have to stick together.
- Velma Dinkley was a leading scientist in the Nevada Complex. Throughout her life, Velma never had any friends and considered herself as incapable of making them due to her extraordinary intelligence and low social skills. Being quite shy and socially awkward, Velma does not speak very much. Still, with a brilliant and objective mind, and armed with doctorates in the fields of biology, chemistry, physics, astrophysics, astronomy, mathematics and engineering, she is usually the one that comes up with theories and plans on how to deal with the numerous monsters that attack her and the rest of the gang.

=== Recurring characters ===
- The Four are Velma's former employers who operate several underground facilities and perform weird scientific experiments.
- Scrappy-Doo is one of the test subjects of the "Smart Dog" program at the underground Nevada Complex. Scrappy has two objectives on his mind: upgrading his implants that give him human-like attributes and killing Scooby-Doo, the prototype of the Smart Dog program, whom he hates because he sees him as a soft-hearted weakling. He also hates humans, given the experiments that they performed on him. He leads the Scrappy Gang, which is composed of some of the other test subjects of the program, as well as a runaway orphan named Cliffy, who he adopted and has grown fond of ever since.
- Daisy Dinkley is Rufus Dinkley's wife and Velma's sister-in-law. Being Rufus' trophy wife, she was always treated as such, with Rufus always demeaning her.
- Cliffy is a runaway orphan that Scrappy-Doo adopts while searching for Velma and the rest of the Scooby Gang.
- The Nanite King is the artificially intelligent being behind Project Elysium and the true mastermind behind the monster apocalypse.

== Back-up stories ==
A serialized, rebooted Secret Squirrel and Morocco Mole story ran in issues #16-29, and a similar Atom Ant story ran in issues #30-36.

Secret Squirrel

Agent 000 (Secret Squirrel) of the I.S.S. works with Agent Honey Bea of MI6, an ex-girlfriend of his, as well as Morocco Mole (who is now the Chief of the I.S.S., although Secret Squirrel himself does not acknowledge this) to discover who has been killing scientists all over the world and stealing their brains.

Atom Ant

Atom Ant, as well as a sentient plant named Itty, are auditioning to join the Justice League of America. They are put to the test by different members of the League, each getting three points. Despite Itty actually performing better than Atom Ant and listening to the League members' instructions during each test, the Justice League offers the role to Atom Ant. Before he accepts, Atom Ant sees Itty disappointed and declines. The League then offers the role to Itty, but Itty also declines. Atom Ant and Itty decide to team up and be a superhero duo together, while the Justice League is stupefied that an ant and a plant both declined membership to the League.

== Publications ==
- Scooby Apocalypse volume 1 (2017-02-01): Includes #1-6.
- Scooby Apocalypse volume 2 (2017-09-20): Includes #7-12.
- Scooby Apocalypse volume 3 (2018-02-07): Includes #13-18.
- Scooby Apocalypse volume 4 (2018-09-19): Includes #19-24.
- Scooby Apocalypse volume 5 (2019-05-22): Includes #25-30.
- Scooby Apocalypse volume 6 (2020-01-15): Includes #31-36.

== Reception ==
Scooby Apocalypse has garnered mostly positive reviews from critics. At the review aggregator website Comic Book Roundup, the series holds a 7.4 out of 10 rating, based on 210 reviews.
