= List of Hanna-Barbera characters =

The following is a list of characters created by and featured in various Hanna-Barbera productions and series:

== 2 Stupid Dogs (1993–1995) ==
2 Stupid Dogs

- Big Dog
- Little Dog
- Mr. Hollywood
- The Kitten
- Red Riding Hood
- Grandma
- The Wolf
- The Witch
- Secret Squirrel
- Morocco Mole
- The Chief
- Penny the Squirrel
- Kenny Fouler
- Buffy Zigenhagen

== The All New Popeye Hour (1978–1983) ==
The All New Popeye Hour

- Alice the Goon
- Bluto
- Col. Crumb
- Dinky
- Eugene the Jeep
- Olive Oyl
- Monica
- Pipeye
- Peepeye
- Popeye
- Poopdeck Pappy
- Poopeye
- Pupeye
- Sandy
- Sgt. Bertha Blast
- Swee'Pea
- Uncle Dudley
- Wimpy

== The Amazing Chan and the Chan Clan (1972) ==
The Amazing Chan and the Chan Clan

- Charlie Chan
- Henry Chan
- Stanley Chan
- Suzie Chan
- Alan Chan
- Anne Chan
- Tom Chan
- Flip Chan
- Nancy Chan
- Mimi Chan
- Scooter Chan
- Chu Chu

== The Atom Ant Show (1965–1967) ==
The Atom Ant Show

- Atom Ant
- Precious Pupp
- Granny Sweet
- The Hillbilly Bears
  - Paw Rugg
  - Maw Rugg
  - Floral Rugg
  - Shag Rugg

== The Banana Splits (1968–1970, 2008) ==
The Banana Splits

- Fleegle
- Bingo
- Drooper
- Snorky
- The Banana Vac
- Cuckoo Clock
- Goofy Gopher
- The Sour Grapes Bunch
- The Dilly Sisters

== The Berenstain Bears (1985–1987) ==
The Berenstain Bears

- Actual Factual
- Bigpaw
- Brother Bear
- Cousin Freddy
- Farmer Ben
- Grizzly Gramps
- Grizzly Gran
- Grumpy Grizzly
- Henchweasels
- Jake
- Lazy Grizzly
- Lizzy Bruin
- Mama Bear
- Mayor Honeypot
- Miss Bearson
- Mrs. Ben
- Officer Marguerite
- Papa Q. Bear
- Parter Pete
- Queen Nectar
- Raffish Ralph
- Sister Bear
- Teacher Jane
- Too Tall
- Two Ton
- Weasel McGreed

== Birdman and the Galaxy Trio (1967–1969) ==
Birdman and the Galaxy Trio

- Birdman
- Avenger
- Falcon 7
- Birdboy
- Birdgirl
- Gravity Girl
- Meteor Man
- Vapor Man

== The Biskitts (1983) ==
The Biskitts

- Waggs
- Sweets
- Shiner
- Lady
- Bump
- Scat
- Mooch
- Wiggle
- Spinner
- King Max
- Shecky
- Scratch

== Butch Cassidy and the Sundance Kids (1973) ==
Butch Cassidy and the Sundance Kids

- Butch Cassidy
- Merilee
- Wally
- Steffi
- Elvis
- Mr. Socrates

== CB Bears ==
CB Bears

- Hustle
- Bump
- Boogie
- Charlie
- Undercover Elephant
- Loud Mouse
- Chief
- Shake the Ghost
- Rattle the Ghost
- Roll the Ghost
- the Ghost Mouse
- Mordicat
- Sidney Merciless the Ghost Exterminator
- Heyyy It's the King
  - The King
  - Skids
  - Yukayuka
  - Big H
  - Clyde
  - Zelda
  - Sheena
- Crazy Legs
- Blast-Off Buzzard
- Posse Impossible
  - Sheriff
  - Stick
  - Blubber
  - Big Duke
  - Miss Lil'
  - Mother Lode

== Captain Caveman and the Teen Angels (1977–1980) ==
Captain Caveman and the Teen Angels

- Captain Caveman
- Brenda Chance
- Dee Dee Skyes
- Taffy Dare

== Captain Planet and the Planeteers (1990–1996) ==
Captain Planet and the Planeteers

- Captain Planet
- Gaia
- Gi
- Kwame
- Linka
- Ma-Ti
- Wheeler

== The Cartoon Cartoon Show (1995) ==
The Cartoon Cartoon Show

- Pfish and Chip
- Blammo the Clown
- Eustace and Muriel
- Gramps and his grandchildren
- Larry and Steve
- Godfrey and Zeek
- Zoonatiks and Mr. Hackensack
- Fat Cats (Louie and Elmo)
- Hard Luck Duck and Crocodile Harley
- Pizza Boy and Tumbleweed Tex
- Boid and Worm
- Bloo, Simon, and Scully
- The Ignoramooses (Sherwood and Pomeroy)
- Malcolm and Melvin
- Mina and the Count
- Johnny the Worm and Sally
- Robots
- Yuckie Duck and Sledgehammer O'Possum
- Yoink of the Yukon
- Shake and Flick
- Jof
- Snoot the Flea and Al the Dog

== Casper and the Space Angels (1979) ==
Casper and the Angels

- Casper
- Hairy Scary
- Mini
- Maxi
- Commander
- Nerdley
- Fungo

== Clue Club (1976–1977) ==
Clue Club

- Larry
- D.D.
- Pepper
- Dottie
- Woofer
- Wimper
- Dr.Pepper

== The Completely Mental Misadventures of Ed Grimley (1988) ==
The Completely Mental Misadventures of Ed Grimley

- Ed Grimley
- Ms. Malone
- Leo Freebus
- Deidre Freebus
- Wendell Malone
- Roger Gustav
- Emil Gustav
- Count Floyd (live actor)

== Cow and Chicken (1997–1999) ==
Cow and Chicken

- Cow
- Chicken
- Mom
- Dad
- The Red Guy
- Cerberus
- Flem
- Earl
- Boneless Chicken
- Teacher

== Daisy-Head Mayzie (1995) ==
Daisy-Head Mayzie

- The Cat in the Hat
- Daisy-Head Mayzie/Mayzie McGrew

== Dastardly and Muttley in Their Flying Machines (1969–1971) ==
Dastardly and Muttley in Their Flying Machines

- Dick Dastardly
- Muttley
- Klunk
- Zilly
- General
- Yankee Doodle Pigeon

== Devlin (1974) ==
Devlin

- Ernie Devlin
- Tod Devlin
- Sandy Devlin
- Henry 'Hank' McSummers

== Dexter's Laboratory (1996–2003) ==
Dexter's Laboratory

- Dexter
- Dee Dee
- Mandark
- Mom
- Dad
- Monkey
- Agent Honeydew
- Major Glory
- The Infraggable Krunk
- Valhallen
- Koosalagoopagoop

== Dinky Dog (1978–1981) ==
Dinky Dog

- Dinky
- Uncle Dudley
- Sandy
- Monica

== Droopy, Master Detective (1993) ==
Droopy, Master Detective

- Droopy
- Dripple
- Miss Vavoom
- Screwball Squirrel
- Lightning Bolt the Super Squirrel
- Wild Mouse

== Dynomutt, Dog Wonder (1976–1977) ==
Dynomutt, Dog Wonder

- Dynomutt, Dog Wonder
- Radley Crown/The Blue Falcon

== The Flintstones and related spin-offs (1960–present) ==
The Flintstones

- Fred Flintstone
- Wilma Flintstone
- Pebbles Flintstone
- Dino
- Woolly
- Barney Rubble
- Betty Rubble
- Bamm-Bamm Rubble
- Hoppy
- Snoots
- George Nate Slate
- The Great Gazoo
- The Gruesomes
  - Weirdly Gruesome
  - Creepella Gruesome
  - Goblin "Gobby" Gruesome
  - Schneider
- Joe Rockhead
- Mr. Slate

== Foofur (1986–1988) ==
Foofur

- Annabell
- Baby
- Bernie
- Bertie
- Blaze
- Boombah
- Brenda
- Brigette
- Brisbane
- Burt
- Celia
- Chucky
- Cleo
- Dobkins
- Dolly
- Duke
- Fencer
- Fritz-Carlos
- Foofur
- Hazel
- Harvey
- Irma
- Jojo
- Killer
- Lorenzo
- Louis
- Lucy
- Mel
- Mrs. Escrow
- Mr. Mutton
- Muffy
- Norris
- Obscura
- Otto
- Pam
- Pepe
- Phyllis
- Rocki
- Rover Cleveland
- Sam
- Sarge
- Trendy
- Tugboat
- Vinnie
- Willy

== Godzilla (1978–1981) ==
Godzilla

- Godzilla
- Godzooky
- Captain Carl Majors
- Brock Borden
- Dr. Quinn Darien
- Pete Darien

== Goober and the Ghost Chasers (1973–1975) ==
Goober and the Ghost Chasers

- Goober
- Ted
- Tina
- Gillie

== The Great Grape Ape Show (1975–1978) ==
The Great Grape Ape Show

- The Great Grape Ape
- Beegle Beagle

== The Hanna–Barbera New Cartoon Series (1962) ==
The Hanna-Barbera New Cartoon Series

- Lippy the Lion and Hardy Har Har
- Touché Turtle and Dum Dum
- Wally Gator

== Help!... It's the Hair Bear Bunch! (1971–1974) ==
Help!... It's the Hair Bear Bunch!

- Hair Bear
- Square Bear
- Bubi Bear
- Eustace P. Peevly
- Lionel J. Botch
- Superintendent

== The Herculoids (1967–1969, 1981–1982) ==
The Herculoids

- Zandor
- Tarra
- Dorno
- Zok
- Igoo
- Tundro
- Gloop and Gleep

== Hong Kong Phooey (1974–1976) ==
Hong Kong Phooey

- Penrod "Penry" Pooch/Hong Kong Phooey
- Sargeant Flint
- Rosemary
- Spot

== The Huckleberry Hound Show (1958–1962) ==
The Huckleberry Hound Show

- Huckleberry Hound
- Yogi Bear
- Boo-Boo Bear
- Cindy Bear
- Ranger Smith
- Pixie & Dixie
- Mr. Jinks
- Hokey Wolf
- Ding-A-Ling Wolf

== I Am Weasel (1997–2000) ==
I Am Weasel

- I.M. Weasel
- I.R. Baboon
- The Red Guy
- Loulabelle
- Jolly Roger
- Admiral Bullets

== The Impossibles (1966) ==
The Impossibles

- Coil Man
- Fluid Man
- Multi-Man
- Big D

== Inch High Private Eye ==
Inch High, Private Eye

- Inch High
- Lori
- Gator
- Braveheart

== Jabberjaw (1976–1978) ==
Jabberjaw

- Jabberjaw
- Biff
- Shelly
- Bubbles
- Clamhead

== Jana of the Jungle (1978) ==
Jana of the Jungle

- Jana
- Montaro
- Ghost
- Tico
- Dr. Ben Cooper

== Jeannie (1973–1975) ==
Jeannie

- Jeannie
- Babu
- Corey Anders
- Henry Glopp
- The Great Hadji, Master of All Genies
- Mrs. Lindsay Anders
- S. Melvin Farthinghill

== The Jetsons (1962–1987) ==
The Jetsons

- George Jetson
- Jane Jetson
- Judy Jetson
- Elroy Jetson
- Astro
- Orbitty
- Rosie the Robot
- Henry Orbit
- Cosmo G. Spacely
- Spencer Cogswell
- R.U.D.I.
- Uniblab

== Johnny Bravo (1997–2004) ==
Johnny Bravo

- Johnny Bravo
- Bunny Bravo
- Suzy
- Carl
- Pops
- Bobo

== Jonny Quest (1964–1965) ==
Jonny Quest

- Jonny Quest
- Hadji
- Dr. Benton Quest
- Race Bannon
- Jessie Bannon
- Bandit

== Josie and the Pussycats (1970–1972) ==
Josie and the Pussycats

- Josie McCoy
- Valerie Brown
- Melody Valentine
- Alan M. Mayberry
- Alexander Cabot III
- Alexandra Cabot and her cat, Sebastian

== The Kwicky Koala Show (1981) ==
The Kwicky Koala Show

- Kwicky Koala
- Wilford Wolf
- Crazy Claws
- Rawhide Clyde
- Bristletooth
- Ranger Rangerfield
- Dirty Dawg
- Ratso
- Officer Bullhorn
- George
- Joey

== Loopy De Loop (1959–1965) ==
Loopy De Loop

- Loopy De Loop

== Magilla Gorilla (1963–1967) ==
Magilla Gorilla

- Magilla Gorilla
- Mr. Peebles
- Ogee
- Punkin Puss
- Mushmouse
- Ricochet Rabbit
- Droop-A-Long Coyote

== Moby Dick and Mighty Mightor (1967–1969) ==
Moby Dick and Mighty Mightor

- Mightor/Tor
- Sheera
- Lil' Rock
- Tog
- Ork
- Pondo
- Moby Dick
- Tom
- Tub
- Scooby the Seal

== The New Adventures of Captain Planet (1993–1996) ==
The New Adventures of Captain Planet

- Captain Planet
- Gaia
- Kwame
- Wheeler
- Linka
- Gi
- Ma-Ti
- Suchi

== Once Upon a Forest (1993) ==
Once Upon a Forest

- The Furlings (Abigail, Edgar, Russell)
- Cornelius
- Michelle
- Phineas
- Willy
- Waggs
- Bosworth

== Pac-Man (1982–1984) ==
Pac-Man

- Pac-Man
- Pepper (Ms. Pac-Man)
- Pac-Baby
- Chomp-Chomp
- Sour-Puss
- Super Pac
- P.J.
- Mezmeron
- Inky
- Blinky
- Pinky
- Clyde
- Sue
- Dinky

== The Perils of Penelope Pitstop (1969–1971) ==
The Perils of Penelope Pitstop

- Penelope Pitstop
- The Ant Hill Mob (Clyde, Dum Dum, Zippy, Pockets, Yak Yak, Snoozy, Softie)
- Chug-a-Boom (The Ant Hill Mob's car)
- Sylvester Sneekly (a.k.a. The Hooded Claw)
- The Bully Brothers

== Peter Potamus Show (1964–1965) ==
The Peter Potamus Show

- Peter Potamus
- So-So
- Yippee
- Yappee
- Yahooey
- Breezly
- Sneezly

== Pink Panther and Sons (1984–1985) ==
Pink Panther and Sons

- Anney O'Gizmo
- Bowlhead
- Buckethead
- Chatta
- Finko
- Howl
- Murfel
- Liona
- Panky
- Pink Panther
- Pinky
- Punkin
- Rocko

== Pound Puppies (1985, 1986–1987) ==
Pound Puppies

- Cooler
- Nose-Marie
- Bright Eyes
- Whopper
- Howler
- Holly
- Katrina Stoneheart
- Bratina
- Catgut
- Captain Slaughter

== The Powerpuff Girls (1998-2005) ==
The Powerpuff Girls

- The Powerpuff Girls
  - Blossom
  - Bubbles
  - Buttercup
- Professor Utonium
- Mayor
- Ms. Bellum
- Miss Keane
- Rainbow the Clown a.k.a. Mr. Mime
- Mojo Jojo
- Him
- Fuzzy Lumpkins
- Princess Morbucks
- The Gangreen Gang
  - Ace
  - Snake
  - Lil' Arturo
  - Grubber
  - Big Billy
- The Amoeba Boys
  - Bossman
  - Junior
  - Slim
- Sedusa
- The Rowdyruff Boys
  - Brick
  - Boomer
  - Butch

== The Quick Draw McGraw Show (1959–1961) ==
The Quick Draw McGraw Show

- Quick Draw McGraw
- Baba Looey
- Augie Doggie and Doggie Daddy
  - Augie Doggie
  - Doggie Daddy
- Snooper and Blabber
  - Super Snooper
  - Blabber Mouse

== The Roman Holidays (1972) ==
The Roman Holidays

- Augustus "Gus" Holiday
- Laurie Holiday
- Happius "Hap" Holiday
- Precocia Holiday
- Evictus (the landlord)
- Groovia
- Brutus the Lion
- Mr. Tycoonius

== The Ruff and Reddy Show (1957–1960) ==
The Ruff and Reddy Show

- Ruff
- Reddy
- Professor Gizmo
- Ubble Ubble
- Captain Greedy
- Salt Water Daffy
- Harry Safari

== Scooby-Doo and related spin-offs (1969–present) ==
Scooby-Doo

- Mystery Incorporated
  - Scooby-Doo
  - Shaggy Rogers
  - Velma Dinkley
  - Daphne Blake
  - Fred Jones
  - Scrappy-Doo
  - Mystery Machine
- Doo Family
  - Scooby-Dum
  - Yabba-Doo
  - Scooby-Dee
- Associates
  - Vincent Van Ghoul, Flim Flam, Weerd and Bogel
  - Meako, Shreako and Freako
  - Matches, Sibella, Elsa Frankenteen, Winnie, Phantasma, Tanis, and Miss Grimwood
  - Googie
  - Detective Beau Neville
  - The Hex Girls
  - Crystal and Amber

== Sealab 2020 (1972) ==
Sealab 2020

- Captain Michael "Mike" Murphy
- Paul Williams
- Lieutenant Sparks
- Robert Murphy
- Sally Murphy
- Hal
- Gail
- Ed

== The Secret Squirrel Show (1965–1968) ==
The Secret Squirrel Show

- Secret Squirrel
- Morocco Mole
- Chief Double-Q
- Squiddly Diddly
- Chief Winchley
- Winsome Witch

== Shazzan (1967) ==
Shazzan

- Shazzan
- Chuck
- Nancy
- Kaboobie

== The Skatebirds (1977–1978) ==
The Skatebirds

- Knock-Knock
- Satchel
- Scooter
- Scat Cat

== The Smurfs (1981–1990) ==
The Smurfs

- List of The Smurfs characters

== Snorks (1984-1989) ==
Snorks

- List of Snorks characters

== Space Ghost and Dino Boy (1966–1968) ==
Space Ghost and Dino Boy

- Space Ghost
- Jan
- Jace
- Blip
- Moltar
- Brak
- Zorak
- Dino Boy
- Ugh the caveman
- Bronty the baby Brontosaurus

== The Space Kidettes (1966-1967) ==
The Space Kidettes

- Scooter
- Jenny
- Countdown
- Snoopy
- Pup star
- Captain Sky hook
- Static

== Speed Buggy (1973) ==
Speed Buggy

- Speed Buggy
- Mark
- Debbie
- Tinker

== SWAT Kats: The Radical Squadron (1993–1995) ==
SWAT Kats: The Radical Squadron

- Chance "T-Bone" Furlong
- Jake "Razor" Clawson
- Deputy Mayor Calico "Callie" Briggs
- Mayor Manx
- Commander Ulysses Feral
- Lieutenant Commander Steele
- Lieutenant Felina Feral
- The Enforcer Sergeant
- Dark Kat
- Dr. Viper
- Mac and Molly Mange, the Metalikats
- The Pastmaster
- Hard Drive
- Lenny Ringtail/Madkat
- Turmoil
- Dr. Harley Street
- The Dark SWAT Kats
- Dr. Abby Sinian
- Henson, Sinian's assistant
- Randall
- Professor Hackle
- Ann Gora
- Jonny K.
- Al
- David Litterbin
- Burke and Murray
- Little old lady
- Talon and Lem
- Tiger Conklin
- Taylor
- Fango
- Kascratch and his gang
- Captain Grimalken

== Teen Force ==
Teen Force

- Kid Comet
- Moleculad
- Elektra
- Plutem
- Glax
- Uglor

== These Are the Days (1974–1975) ==
These Are the Days

- Homer
- Kathy Day
- Danny Day
- Jeff Day
- Martha Day
- Ben Day

== Tom and Jerry shows and specials (1940–1958, 1975, 1990–1993) ==
Tom and Jerry (1940–1958) / The Tom and Jerry Show (1975) / Tom and Jerry Kids / The Mansion Cat

- Tom the Cat
- Jerry the Mouse
- Spike the Bulldog
- Tyke the Dog
- Butch
- Lightning
- Meathead
- Topsy
- Nibbles the Mouse (later called Tuffy, but still sometimes called Nibbles)
- Quacker
- Droopy

== Top Cat (1961–1962) ==
Top Cat

- Top Cat ("T.C.")
- Benny the Ball
- Brain
- Choo Choo
- Fancy-Fancy
- Spook
- Officer Dibble

== Valley of the Dinosaurs (1974–1976) ==
Valley of the Dinosaurs

- John Butler
- Kim Butler
- Katie Butler
- Greg Butler
- Digger
- Gorak
- Tana
- Lok
- Gara
- Glump

== Wacky Races (1968–1970) ==
Wacky Races

- Dick Dastardly and Muttley
- Penelope Pitstop
- Peter Perfect
- Rock and Gravel Slag
- Big Gruesome and Little Gruesome (also known as the Gruesome Twosome)
- Professor Pat Pending
- The Red Max
- Sergeant Blast and Private Meekly
- The Ant Hill Mob (Clyde, Ring-A-Ding, Danny, Kurby, Mac, Rug Bug Benny, and Willy)
- Lazy Luke and Blubber Bear
- Rufus Ruffcut and Sawtooth

== Wait Till Your Father Gets Home (1972–1974) ==
Wait Till Your Father Gets Home

- Harry Boyle
- Irma Boyle
- Alice Boyle
- Chet Boyle
- Jamie Boyle
- Ralph Kane

== Wheelie and the Chopper Bunch (1974–1975) ==
Wheelie and the Chopper Bunch

- Wheelie
- Rota Ree
- Chopper
- Revs
- Hi-Riser
- Scrambles
- Captain Tough
- Officer Fishtail

== Where's Huddles? (1970) ==
Where's Huddles?

- Ed Huddles
- Marge Huddles
- Bubba McCoy
- Penny McCoy
- Claude Pertwee
- Freight Train
- Pom Pom Huddles
- Fumbles the dog
- Beverly the cat
- Mad Dog Maloney

== The Yogi Bear Show and related spin-offs (1961–present) ==
The Yogi Bear Show

- Yogi Bear
- Boo-Boo Bear
- Cindy Bear
- Ranger Smith
- Yakky Doodle
- Chopper
- Fibber Fox
- Alfy Gator
- Snagglepuss

== See also ==
- Hanna-Barbera
- Cartoon Network Studios
- Craig McCracken
- Dr. Seuss
- Theatrically released films based on Hanna-Barbera animations
- DePatie-Freleng Enterprises
- Lauren Faust
- Metro-Goldwyn-Mayer cartoon studio
- Warner Bros. Animation
- Warner Bros. Cartoons
