= Snuffles (character) =

American animated television character by Hanna Barbera

Snuffles gesturing in request of a dog treat

Snuffles is an anthropomorphic cartoon dog appearing in animated television shorts produced by Hanna-Barbera beginning in 1959 on The Quick Draw McGraw Show. Daws Butler provided his voice.

== Character description ==
Snuffles is a bloodhound used by Quick Draw McGraw to ferret out bad guys in the old West but needed to be bribed with a dog biscuit before performing his task. Upon chomping on one, he would hug himself in ecstasy, jump into the air and float back down, sighing. Occasionally, Snuffles would demand more than one biscuit, and was willing to accept them from bad guys as well. In several cases when Quick Draw did not have a dog biscuit to offer due to being out of them or if he tried to give Snuffles the reward cash for capturing an outlaw, Snuffles would either shake his head and say "Uh-uh" or grunt to himself and mumble "Darn cheapskate!" as well as sometimes throwing the reward money back in Quick Draw's face.

Joseph Barbera once said that Snuffles was added to cartoons at the request of the sponsor, Kellogg's Cereals.

== Appearances ==
Snuffles appeared in seven Quick Draw McGraw cartoons and one Snagglepuss cartoon:

| Airdate | Cartoon | Segment Of |
|---|---|---|
| November 28, 1959 | Bow-Wow Bandit | Quick Draw McGraw |
| December 19, 1959 | Cattle Battle Rattled | Quick Draw McGraw |
| February 6, 1960 | Bronco Bustin' Boobs | Quick Draw McGraw |
| October 8, 1960 | Ali-Baba Looey | Quick Draw McGraw |
| November 12, 1960 | Scooter Rabbit | Quick Draw McGraw |
| September 22, 1961 | Dynamite Fright | Quick Draw McGraw |
| October 13, 1961 | Mine Your Manners | Quick Draw McGraw |
| December 2, 1961 | Tail Wag Snag | Snagglepuss |

He also made an appearance on the Johnny Bravo episode "Double Vision".

== See also ==
- List of Hanna-Barbera characters
