= Atom Ant =

American animated television series

- Also known as: The Atom Ant Show
- Genre: Science fiction Comedy; Action-adventure; Superhero
- Written by: Tony Benedict; Warren Foster
- Directed by: Joseph Barbera; William Hanna
- Voices of: Howard Morris; Don Messick; Janet Waldo; Henry Corden; Allan Melvin
- Theme music composer: Ted Nichols
- Composer: Ted Nichols
- Country of origin: United States
- Original language: English
- No. of seasons: 2
- No. of episodes: 26

Production
- Producers: Joseph Barbera; William Hanna
- Running time: 30 minutes
- Production company: Hanna-Barbera Productions

Original release
- Network: NBC
- Release: October 2, 1965 – September 7, 1967

Atom Ant is a cartoon ant and superhero created by Hanna-Barbera in 1965. Atom co-starred in The Atom Ant/Secret Squirrel Show (sharing top billing with Secret Squirrel) on Saturday mornings. In syndication, Atom Ant aired alongside The Hillbilly Bears and Precious Pupp. Reruns aired on cable on Cartoon Network and Boomerang in the 1990s and 2000s.

== Biography ==
Atom Ant (originally voiced by Howard Morris, then by Don Messick in later episodes) is a superhero ant who operates out of an anthill in the countryside, where he possesses such things as a mainframe computer and exercise equipment. His powers mostly consist of the ability to fly, superspeed, incredible strength, and invulnerability. His catchphrase is "Up and at 'em, Atom Ant!" He was often contacted by the police, who sent him out on an assignment.

Some of these missions parody the missions of Batman. The police force is constantly shown to be underfunded and inept, as they rely on Atom Ant to do all their police work. As seen in "Nobody's Fool," the only two police officers are the chief of police and the deputy chief. The department has only one rusted patrol car. Atom Ant fights various villains, including recurring ones like Ferocious Flea (also voiced by Messick) and mad scientist Professor Von Gimmick (voiced by Allan Melvin).

== List of episodes ==
=== Season 1 (1965–66) ===
No. overall	No. in season	Title	Original release date
1	1	"Up and Atom"	October 2, 1965
A criminal called Big Fats Dynamo (voiced by Allen Melvin) makes a prison break. Atom Ant, sent to recapture him, outsmarts him to the point of a knockout.
2	2	"Crankenshaft's Monster"	October 9, 1965
The mad Doctor Crankenshaft (voiced by Allen Melvin), M.D. (which stands for Mad Doctor) creates a little glob that increases in size with every bite it eats. Atom Ant reduces the glob's size with a spin.
3	3	"Gem-A-Go-Go"	October 16, 1965
The Tura Lura Topaz gets stolen by Fancy Fingers Finnegan (voiced by Allen Melvin). Atom Ant has to get through Finnegan's traps to catch him and recover the jewel.
4	4	"Ferocious Flea"	October 23, 1965
A flea circus ringmaster and his star performer, Ferocious Flea, rob a lot of banks without leaving a trace. Atom Ant follows their trail and blows their cover.
5	5	"Rambling Robot"	October 30, 1965
Delbert, a robot, (voiced by Don Messick) built by two kids Junior (also voiced by Messick) and his friend (voiced by Janet Waldo) goes out of control and smashes things in his path. Atom Ant has a hard time smashing the robot, then rebuilding it. Janet Waldo also voices Junior's Mom.
6	6	"Nobody's Fool"	November 6, 1965
Two thugs operate in a robbery while their accomplice Anastasia Antnik waylays Atom Ant, but she turns against the thugs.
7	7	"Atom Ant Meets Karate Ant"	November 13, 1965
A criminal and his partner, Muscles, send an ant called Mr. Muto to take care of Atom Ant, but they get into a friendly chat instead.
8	8	"Fastest Ant in the West"	November 20, 1965
Atom Ant is summoned by a town sheriff to take care of the outlaw Rowdy Dowdy, who is not giving up easily.
9	9	"Mistaken Identity"	November 27, 1965
Ferocious Flea assumes Atom Ant's identity and sets him up for robberies with the help of his henchdog Slappsy Muggsy. Atom Ant unmasks Ferocious in his latest heist.
10	10	"How Now Bow Wow"	December 4, 1965
Ferocious Flea and his henchman Bone Brains steal a first prize-winning dog from a dog show. Atom gets the two out of the way and returns the dog.
11	11	"Dragon Master"	December 11, 1965
Dr. Strangebug (voiced by Allen Melvin) and his henchman (voiced by Henry Corden) puts Atom Ant in a time machine taking him to Arthurian times. Atom Ant saves the kingdom from a dragon before returning to his own time.
12	12	"The Big Gimmick"	December 18, 1965
Atom Ant battles Professor Von Gimmick (voiced by Allen Melvin) in his gigantic robot. Dr. Von Gimmick attempts to get the ant out of the way with his one weakness: a picnic.
13	13	"Super Blooper"	December 25, 1965
Atom Ant assists the actor playing Super Guy to make him look genuine in front of the public, especially in dealing with a bank robbery.
14	14	"Wild, Wild Ants"	January 1, 1966
Atom Ant battles the Anthill Mob on a picnic raid, until they are resigned to join Atom in his fitness club.
15	15	"Dina-Sore"	January 8, 1966
Atom Ant takes on a museum dinosaur, which has become animated by a bolt of lightning, until the beast is driven out to sea.
16	16	"Amusement Park Amazement"	January 15, 1966
Atom Ant holds off Professor Von Gimmick (voiced by Allen Melvin)'s dangerous weaponry and finally gets him to build the amusement park he intended to construct.
17	17	"Bully for Atom Ant"	January 22, 1966
On a vacation in Mexico, Atom Ant helps a man named Chicken Enchilada to fight in a bullfight in order to win the hand of his beloved Concita in marriage.
18	18	"Termighty Mean"	January 29, 1966
Professor Von Gimmick (voiced by Allen Melvin) assigns Atom Ant to capture his escaped super-eating termite Dotzilla. Atom Ant manages to tame the termite with a stick of bubble gum.
19	19	"Nine Strikes You're Out"	February 5, 1966
Mad scientist J. Dastardly Deeds clones himself eight times with the aid of a cat's mythical nine lives and Atom Ant takes them all out.
20	20	"Go West Young Ant"	February 12, 1966
Atom Ant assists soldier ants in a battle against a red ant colony. Atom Ant challenges the chieftain's son to settle peace between the two ant colonies.

=== Season 2 (1966) ===
No. overall	No. in season	Title	Original release date
21	1	"Knight Fight"	September 10, 1966
With the world at peace, Atom Ant goes to the Middle Ages to assist a kingdom to fight an evil black knight.
22	2	"Pteraducktyl Soup"	September 17, 1966
A pteraducktyl brought to life by a scientist rampages through the city and Atom Ant has trouble getting it to stop.
23	3	"Up in the Air Squares"	September 24, 1966
Buildings are being taken away by a magnet chopper driven by Toadstool (voiced by Allen Melvin). Atom Ant saves the city hall, then proceeds to recover the police building.
24	4	"Mouse Rouser"	October 1, 1966
Little Mousey (voiced by Allen Melvin) sends for Atom Ant's help to protect him from Ali Cat (also voiced by Melvin). Atom Ant stops the cat from further bothering the mouse, but then the cat has a dog chasing him.
25	5	"Killer Diller Gorilla"	October 8, 1966
Atom Ant battles a giant gorilla named Kink Konk, who treats New York City like a toy. Atom eventually drives the gorilla away.
26	6	"Rock-a-Bye Boo-Boo"	October 15, 1966
In the Bavarian outskirts, Atom Ant saves a village from a boulder-looking gigantic roc egg hurtling down the mountain from its nest. Atom Ant returns the egg back to its nest. When the mother roc sees Atom Ant, she mistakenly thinks that he stole her egg and goes crazy by attacking Atom Ant and causing havoc in the population. She ceases her attacks when her egg hatches.

== Other appearances ==
- Atom Ant appeared in a comic book, Atom Ant #1, published by Gold Key/Western Publishing in January 1966.
- Atom Ant later appeared in Yogi's Ark Lark and its spin-off series Yogi's Gang, voiced again by Don Messick.
- In the early 1990s series, Yo Yogi! with Don Messick reprising Atom Ant. He appears as Jellystone Town's residential superhero. In the episode "Super Duper Snag," it was revealed that his Atomic Helmet is his source of power.
- Hi-Tech Software released a budget labeled computer game for the Commodore 64 in 1990 called Atom Ant: Up and Atom. The idea of the game is to fly and collect a certain amount of bombs scattered around high rise buildings and 'atomize' them in a special bubble-like device at the top of each area (a game design influenced by Tehkan's Bomb Jack).
- In 2000, Cartoon Network produced a short cartoon as a part of their "Groovies" series, called "We Must All Get Ready Now". Featuring Atom Ant as the lead character, the short contained several audio tracks from the Atom Ant cartoon, and some audio from the classic Cold War civil defense film, Duck and Cover. The short could formerly be seen as interstitial programming on Boomerang; its last time on the channel being June 1, 2014, due to the network's rebrand in January 2015. The short was directed by Jonas Odell, with its music by Michael Kohler. Sometimes, at that point it was followed by another cartoon that Cartoon Network produced in their "Groovies" or "Shorties" series.
- Atom Ant appeared in Yogi's Treasure Hunt.
- Atom Ant as a picture made a cameo in the "Agent Penny" episode of the Super Secret Secret Squirrel segment of 2 Stupid Dogs.
- Atom Ant makes a cameo appearance in a MetLife television commercial that aired in 2012.
- Atom Ant's catchphrase, "Up and Atom!", is also used by comic book superhero Radioactive Man in The Simpsons.
- Atom Ant as a toy made a cameo in the What's New, Scooby-Doo? episode "Roller Ghoster Ride".
- Atom Ant is featured in the Harvey Birdman, Attorney at Law episode "Incredible Hippo" and voiced by Maurice LaMarche. He appears as the defendant accused of radioactive contamination by the EPA.
- Atom Ant makes a cameo in the direct-to-video film Scooby-Doo! Mask of the Blue Falcon in a framed picture.
- Atom Ant appeared in a back-up feature in Scooby Apocalypse.
- Atom Ant appears in the end credits of Scoob! as a new recruit of the Falcon Force, a new team made by the Blue Falcon. In this version, he has four arms.
- Atom Ant appears in the HBO Max original series Jellystone!.

== Home media ==
The episode "Up And Atom" is available on the DVD Saturday Morning Cartoons 1960s Vol. 1. The episode "Atom Ant Meets Karate Ant" is available on the DVD Saturday Morning Cartoons 1960s Vol. 2, as well as a part of the "A Sample of Boomerang" tape, from Cartoon Network's sister channel, Boomerang. The episode "The Big Gimmick" is available on the DVD Best of Warner Bros. 25 Cartoon Collection Hanna-Barbera. On October 6, 2015, Warner Archive released the complete series on DVD.

In 2016, The Atom Ant Show was made available for download via iTunes Store.

== Voices ==
- Howard Morris as Atom Ant (Season one), Muscles' Boss
- Don Messick as Atom Ant (Season two), Ferocious Flea, Mr. Muto, Narrator
- John Stephenson as Narrator
- Allan Melvin as Muscles, Big Fats Dynamo, Professor Von Gimmick, Little Mousey, Ali Cat, The Toadstool, additional voices
- Ted Cassidy as Opening Announcer (uncredited)
