= Secret Squirrel =

American animated television series

- Original title card
- Genre: Comedy; Adventure
- Created by: William Hanna; Joseph Barbera
- Written by: Michael Maltese; Dalton Sandifer; Warren Foster; Tony Benedict
- Directed by: William Hanna; Joseph Barbera
- Voices of: Mel Blanc; Paul Frees
- Theme music composer: Ted Nichols
- Composers: Ted Nichols; Hoyt Curtin (stock music, uncredited)
- Country of origin: United States
- Original language: English
- No. of seasons: 2
- No. of episodes: 26 (original); 13 (reboot); 39 (total)

Production
- Producers: William Hanna; Joseph Barbera
- Production company: Hanna-Barbera Productions

Original release
- Network: NBC; TBS (reboot)
- Release: October 2, 1965 – November 26, 1966

Secret Squirrel is a cartoon character created by Hanna-Barbera for The Atom Ant/Secret Squirrel Show, which debuted in 1965 on Saturday mornings. The character was given his own show in 1966, titled The Secret Squirrel Show, but was reunited with Atom Ant for one more season in 1967. The half-hour The Secret Squirrel Show included three individual cartoon segments: Secret Squirrel and Morocco Mole, Squiddly Diddly and Winsome Witch. Secret Squirrel first appeared in a prime-time animated special called The World of Secret Squirrel and Atom Ant, which aired on NBC on September 12, 1965.

Secret Squirrel is a parody of the spy genre, and most of the shorts parodied elements of the James Bond films. Secret Squirrel was also known as "Agent 000". In 1993, 13 new Secret Squirrel cartoons appeared in-between the 2 Stupid Dogs first-season episodes, with the updated title Super Secret Secret Squirrel and a new cast.

== Character profile ==
Secret Squirrel (voiced with a slight lisp by Mel Blanc) serves as a secret agent, taking orders from his superior, Double-Q aka the Chief (voiced by Paul Frees), of the International Sneaky Service. Double Q is usually annoyed by Secret Squirrel when he enters the office via other objects in his office instead of using the door like other people. His designation is Agent 000. Secret Squirrel is assisted in his adventures by his fez-wearing, bespectacled sidekick Morocco Mole (also voiced by Paul Frees impersonating Peter Lorre).

The pair fights crime and evil enemy agents using cunning and a variety of spy gadgets, including a machine gun cane, a collection of weapons kept inside Secret's trench coat which is also bulletproof, and a variety of devices concealed in his purple fedora (which has eye holes cut in it and which he seldom removes).

Secret's recurring archenemy is Yellow Pinkie (also voiced by Frees), a parody of both Auric Goldfinger from Goldfinger and of Sydney Greenstreet's portrayal of the Kasper Gutman character from Dashiell Hammett's The Maltese Falcon. He also tangles with such enemies as the Masked Granny, Captain Kidd and Robin Hood and his Merry Mugs. The last three episodes introduced Hi-Spy (again voiced by Frees), a master of scientific criminology.

=== Super Secret Secret Squirrel ===
The 1993 reboot segments saw several changes in characters and artwork compared to the 1960s original cartoons, including the recasting of Jess Harnell as Secret and Jim Cummings as Morocco (as Blanc and Frees had both died several years prior). All the characters inhabiting the world are now animals (except for a gingerbread man and a Quark). Double-Q (voiced by Tony Jay), now simply called "the Chief" in these shorts, is a Cape buffalo with a sour cherry-scented calabash pipe. Yellow Pinkie has been replaced by a sea lion named Goldflipper (voiced by Jim Cummings) who, despite being Secret's archenemy, only appears in one episode of the revival series. These new cartoons also introduce Penny (voiced by Kimmy Robertson), a female squirrel assistant to the Chief (à la Miss Moneypenny) and a possible love interest for Secret (as hinted at in the episodes "Queen Bea" and "Quark").

Secret's art design remains relatively intact, but looks more modern than the original 1960s version of the character, featuring hard lines and sharper angles, giving him a leaner and slicker style. His trademark hat looks slightly different. Secret also loses his signature lisp given to him by Blanc that was similar to that of Sylvester from the Looney Tunes and Merrie Melodies cartoons from Warner Bros. (although it was paid homage to in the episode "Goldflipper", where Secret spoke with it to mock Morocco's sudden lisp in that episode). Harnell's portrayal gives Secret a suave voice in reminiscence of him sometimes breaking into his Wakko Warner voice without the Scouse accent, most notably when he is screaming.

Morocco's color scheme has been redesigned; his wardrobe's palette has been swapped and he wears sunglasses. Cummings' portrayal of Morocco makes his voice less of a Peter Lorre impersonation: the Moroccan accent remains, but the voice is higher-pitched. He also now has an evil twin brother named Scirocco Mole (voiced by Jess Harnell).

Apparently, in the 1993 revival cartoons, the personalities and traits of Secret and Morocco have been switched as opposed to their original 1960s personalities. Morocco was more of a chauffeur and used to be quite intelligent, while in the revival cartoons he is more independent as a sidekick, becomes more of a bungler, and is more childlike, often getting injured (which was Secret's department in the 1960s series) and often using his catchphrase "Okay, Secret!". Secret was portrayed as a bumbling secret agent in the original, while in the revival version he is actually capable of doing his job effectively. He can be both a workaholic and more easygoing while still able to get the job done. Like the original, Secret has a gadget for almost everything but also relies on his mixed martial arts combat skills. Most of his injuries either come from his job or Morocco's bumbling.

The Chief speaks with a British accent now (due to being voiced by Tony Jay), as evidenced by his catchphrase "Good show, Secret".

== Broadcast history ==
The series' debut was on September 12, 1965, in The World of Atom Ant and Secret Squirrel prime-time special on NBC.

The original series, The Atom Ant/Secret Squirrel Show, was broadcast from October 2, 1965, to September 2, 1967. Secret Squirrel had his own show in 1966 and was then reunited with Atom Ant in 1967-1968. Episodes were broadcast in syndication and as part of The Banana Splits variety and compilation series.

=== Super Secret Secret Squirrel ===
Secret Squirrel and Morocco Mole were revived in 1993 for back-up segments of the first season of TBS Superstation's animated series 2 Stupid Dogs. Titled Super Secret Secret Squirrel, these new cartoons featured Secret Squirrel (voiced by Jess Harnell) and Morocco Mole (voiced by Jim Cummings). 2 Stupid Dogs creator Donovan Cook was asked by then-new Hanna-Barbera president Fred Seibert to choose a classic studio cartoon to revive within the main show, and Super Secret Secret Squirrel was the result. The reason to revive Secret Squirrel was because it was one of Cook's favorite Hanna-Barbera shows.

After Cook guided the updated design with artists Paul Rudish and Craig McCracken, supervising producer Larry Huber, the "adult supervision" assigned by Seibert, was responsible for all further aspects of these cartoons. He assigned animator David Feiss to the storyboards.

This new series seems to have fallen under the villain of the week formula. Except for "Egg" and "Agent Penny", every episode is named after the enemies Secret and Morocco encounter.

Secret and Morocco make an appearance in a 2 Stupid Dogs episode titled "Let's Make a Right Price", in which they star in a commercial for Granny's Joybone Doggie Treats. The Little Dog and the Big Dog from 2 Stupid Dogs appear in the Super Secret Secret Squirrel episode "Scirocco Mole" as contestants in a game show.

== Episodes ==
=== Series overview ===
Season	Episodes	Originally aired	
Season	Episodes	Season premiere	Season finale
1	20	October 2, 1965	February 12, 1966
2	6	September 10, 1966	November 26, 1966
Super Secret Secret Squirrel	13	September 5, 1993	November 28, 1993

=== Season 1 (1965–66) ===
No. overall	No. in season	Title	Original release date
1	1	"Sub Swiper"	October 2, 1965
Captain Ahab steals an atomic submarine; Secret and Morocco must capture him and return the sub intact.
2	2	"Masked Granny"	October 9, 1965
Secret and Morocco have a mission to secure the Bombay Bomb in the Pentagon, whilst the Masked Granny plans a heist to steal it.
3	3	"Scotland Yard Caper"	October 16, 1965
Secret receives orders from Scotland Yard to recover the stolen crown jewels. He does, but is himself accused of being the thief by the police.
4	4	"Robin Hood & His Merry Muggs"	October 23, 1965
Secret and Morocco try to track down some thieves who are using a Robin Hood television show to cover their thefts.
5	5	"Wolf in Cheap Cheap Clothing"	October 30, 1965
Secret and Morocco are sent to stop Wily Wolf from smuggling sheep. Secret lures him into a trap with a "Little Red Riding Hood" scenario.
6	6	"Royal Run Around"	November 6, 1965
Secret and Morocco are assigned to safeguard Pasha Panchabaggie, but Pasha rides away on his flying carpet and proves difficult to catch despite the many gadgets at Secret's disposal.
7	7	"Yellow Pinkie"	November 13, 1965
Secret and Morocco are sent to catch an enemy agent called Yellow Pinkie, who seems to be too smart for them.
8	8	"Five Is a Crowd"	November 20, 1965
Dr. Dangit creates five robot duplicates of Secret Squirrel to commit crimes and frame the real one for them. Secret follows the duplicates to Dangit's hideout and turns them against him.
9	9	"It Stopped Training"	November 27, 1965
Secret and Morocco are put on a case to recover the Silver Streak Express train, which is stolen by Yellow Pinkie with a shrinking ray gun.
10	10	"Wacky Secret Weapon"	December 4, 1965
Secret and Morocco are assigned to protect a secret weapon only to lose it to Yellow Pinkie, but they pin him down at the seaport.
11	11	"Cuckoo Clock Cuckoo"	December 11, 1965
Secret receives a mission from England to retrieve Big Ben, stolen by a giant who wants to make a cuckoo clock out of it.
12	12	"Catty Cornered"	December 18, 1965
Upon being called in by a scientist, Secret and Morocco attempt to catch a cat who swallowed an explosive capsule. A cat-chasing dog makes their task difficult, and a "doggone temper" erupts.
13	13	"Leave Wheel Enough Alone"	December 25, 1965
Secret and Morocco try to catch Yellow Pinkie, who has stolen all the gold from the mint, but will have to chase him in a car race first.
14	14	"Jester Minute"	January 1, 1966
Secret and Morocco are sent to safeguard the king's crown, only for it to be stolen by Yellow Pinkie. Secret thwarts every one of his enemy's traps in order to recover the king's crown.
15	15	"Not So Idle Idol"	January 8, 1966
Yellow Pinkie steals a golden idol and only Secret can locate its whereabouts.
16	16	"Gold Rushed"	January 15, 1966
While vacationing in Washington D.C., Secret and Morocco chase after Yellow Pinkie, who has stolen gold bullion from the Granbovian embassy.
17	17	"Double Ex-Double Cross"	January 22, 1966
Secret and Morocco investigate the petrified population of Okey Dokey Isle, where they encounter the responsible perpetrator, Double-Ex.
18	18	"Capt. Kidd's Not Kidding"	January 29, 1966
Secret and Morocco go aboard a Spanish galleon to investigate the ghost of Captain Kidd, who is actually Yellow Pinkie seeking gold.
19	19	"Bold Rush"	February 5, 1966
Morocco takes the liberty of locating a gold shipment stolen by Yellow Pinkie all by himself. Secret discreetly assists Morocco during his vacation.
20	20	"Tusk-Tusk"	February 12, 1966
Secret and Morocco try to find a missing elephant that was taken prisoner by the Grand Wazir to overthrow the Rajah.

=== Season 2 (1966) ===
No. overall	No. in season	Title	Original release date
21	1	"Robot Rout"	September 10, 1966
Yellow Pinkie is promoted to President, due to a mass robotic brainwashing of the citizens. Secret and Morocco head to Yellow Pinkie's lab to confront him, but he turns Morocco against Secret.
22	2	"The Pink Sky Mobile"	September 17, 1966
Secret and Morocco battle Yellow Pinkie in his new Pink Sky Mobile against their Spy Car. Both sides end up with scooting vehicles.
23	3	"Scuba Duba Duba"	September 24, 1966
Secret and Morocco are assigned to recover a missile stolen by the enemy agent Scuba Duba before he can destroy the city, which is being held for ransom by him.
24	4	"Hi-Spy"	October 29, 1966
Secret is sent to confront the evil scientific criminology master Hi-Spy face-to-face in France, but Secret cannot outsmart him. Throwaway line: "Naw, it's just swamp gas!"
25	5	"Spy in the Sky"	November 12, 1966
Hi-Spy is intent on causing destruction on the globe with his armed satellite. Secret and Morocco head to the satellite to halt his plans.
26	6	"Ship of Spies"	November 26, 1966
Secret and Morocco are assigned to locate Hi-Spy's invisible ship and put his plan out of action.

=== Super Secret Secret Squirrel (1993) ===
No.	Title	Directed by	Written by	Storyboarded by	Original release date
1	"Goldflipper"	Larry Huber; Robert Alvarez (animation)	Mark Saraceni	Genndy Tartakovsky	September 5, 1993
An evil sea lion named Goldflipper (voiced by Jim Cummings) creates a giant gold magnet that steals golden teeth, which he calls the "Molar-Acoustic-Synctro-Bicuspid-Dental-Magnetic-Electro-Platt-Conductive-Postiviser". Secret goes undercover as a Squirrely Girly Scout to thwart Goldflipper's evil plan and recover all the stolen teeth.
2	"Greg"	Larry Huber; Ron Hugart (animation)	Bobs Gannaway	Rob Renzetti	September 12, 1993
Secret investigates a mysterious candy disappearance caused by a gingerbread man named Greg (voiced by Charlie Adler), who is using ants to steal all the candy in the world, which he will then use to make a giant candy monster.
3	"Quark"	Larry Huber; Robert Alvarez (animation)	Bobs Gannaway	Conrad Vernon	September 19, 1993
A sub-atomic quark known as Quark (voiced by Roger Rose) is destroying important monuments in order to make an amphitheater out of North America. Secret has to shrink down to sub-atomic size in order to stop him.
4	"Queen Bea"	Larry Huber; Ron Hugart (animation)	Mark Saraceni	Don Shank	September 26, 1993
Queen Bea (voiced by B. J. Ward) and her honey bee minions capture Secret during a Honey Bank robbery so that Queen Bea can force Secret's hand in marriage after trapping Morocco in a honey container. Penny comes to his rescue.
5	"Hot Rodney"	Larry Huber; Ron Hugart (animation)	Bobs Gannaway	Tony Craig	October 3, 1993
During a race against a race car driving rooster named Hot Rodney (voiced by Jeff Bennett), Secret is waylaid by Hot Rodney's orchestrated kidnapping of Morocco.
6	"Egg"	Larry Huber; Ron Hugart (animation)	Bobs Gannaway	David Feiss	October 10, 1993
Morocco receives a mandatory special assignment to hold a "rare" and "cursed" egg for at least three seconds, but has a hard time doing so.
7	"Chameleon"	Larry Huber; Ron Hugart (animation)	Bobs Gannaway	Rob Renzetti	October 17, 1993
Expensive paintings are stolen on the night of a museum gala. Secret discovers an art-loving, sophisticated chameleon (voiced by Roddy McDowall) has pilfered all the art for his own personal collection. Secret and Morocco then outsmart him by trapping him in a room full of "modern" art, which Chameleon despises.
8	"Agent Penny"	Larry Huber; Ron Hugart (animation)	Bobs Gannaway, Paul Rudish	David Feiss	October 24, 1993
In an attempt to cut down his expenses, the Chief replaces Secret with Penny and hires Morocco as his secretary. Note: Snooper and Blabber make speaking cameo appearances at a crimefighters' pub. In the same scene, Undercover Elephant from CB Bears, Hong Kong Phooey and Mumbly make background appearances, while the portraits of Scooby-Doo, Ricochet Rabbit & Droop-a-Long, Atom Ant, Hong Kong Phooey, Mumbly and Dynomutt, Dog Wonder are seen with Snooper and Blabber's portraits.
9	"Scirocco Mole"	Larry Huber; Ron Hugart (animation)	Bobs Gannaway	Tony Craig	October 31, 1993
In a quiz show hosted by a fox, Secret relates the origin of his partnership with Morocco and an encounter with Morocco's evil twin brother Scirocco (voiced by Jess Harnell). Note: Yogi Bear and Boo-Boo and the Big Dog and the Little Dog make cameo appearances as the other contestants.
10	"Platypus"	Larry Huber; Ron Hugart (animation)	Bobs Gannaway	Rob Renzetti	November 7, 1993
Secret, Morocco and the Chief get their bodies mixed up in a de-scrambler owned by a platypus (voiced by Mark Hamill) and have a hard time catching him in their altered states.
11	"Doctor O."	Larry Huber; Rob Hugart (animation)	Mark Saraceni; Jim Turner	Paul Rudish, David Feiss, and Tony Craig	November 14, 1993
Secret has to stop an opossum named Doctor O. from blocking out the sun with a satellite, but he has to do it blind and in total darkness. The constant darkness also prevents the Chief from using the rest room.
12	"One Ton"	Larry Huber; Rob Hugart (animation)	Lane Raichert	David Feiss	November 21, 1993
Secret attempts to stop a crazy giant panda called One Ton (voiced by Yoshio Be) from tearing up Chinatown, but he also has strict orders from the Chief not to harm him, because giant pandas are an endangered species. As a result, Secret has to figure out how to defeat the panda without actually fighting him.
13	"Voo Doo Goat"	Larry Huber; Rob Hugart (animation)	Bobs Gannaway	David Feiss	November 28, 1993
Secret must stop an evil shaman goat (voiced by John Garry), who has made a voodoo doll of the Chief in order to gain control over the agency.

== Voices ==
- Mel Blanc as Secret Squirrel (original series)
- Paul Frees as Morocco Mole, Double-Q, Yellow Pinkie, Hi-Spy (original series)
- Jim Cummings as Morocco Mole, Goldflipper (Super Secret Secret Squirrel)
- Jess Harnell as Secret Squirrel, Scirocco Mole (Super Secret Secret Squirrel)
- Tony Jay as Double-Q/the Chief (Super Secret Secret Squirrel)
- Kimmy Robertson as Penny (Super Secret Secret Squirrel)

== Production credits ==
- Produced and Directed by: William Hanna and Joseph Barbera
- Story: Tony Benedict, Warren Foster, Dalton Sandifer, Michael Maltese
- Musical Direction: Ted Nichols
- Story Direction: Alex Lovy, Lewis Marshall, Paul Sommer, Art Scott, Steve Clark, Art Davis
- Voices: Mel Blanc, Paul Frees, John Stephenson, Jean Vander Pyl, Henry Corden, Don Messick, Allan Melvin, Howard Morris, Janet Waldo, Dick Beals, Gerry Johnson
- Animation Direction: Charles A. Nichols
- Production Supervision: Howard Hanson
- Animation: Ray Abrams, Ed Barge, Robert Bemiller, O.E. "Lefty" Callahan, Emil Carle, Hugh Fraser, George Germanetti, George Goepper, Anatole Kirsanoff, Hicks Lokey, Kenneth Muse, George Nicholas, Don Schloat, Larry Silverman, Ralph Somerville, John Sparey
- Layout: Cornelius "Corny" Cole, Jerry Eisenberg, Jack Huber, Lance Nolley, Bill Perez, Tony Sgroi, Bob Singer, Iwao Takamoto
- Background: Fernando Arce, Ron Dias, Rene Garcia, Bob Gentle, F. Montealegre, Richard H. Thomas
- Camera: Gary Milton, Roger Sims, Clarence Wogatzke, Norman Stainback, John Pratt, John Aardal
- Sound Direction: Richard Olson, Bill Getty
- Secret Squirrel
- AMPTP
- RCA Sound Recording
- This Picture Made Under the Jurisdiction of IATSE-IA Affiliated with A.F.L.-C.I.O.
- A Hanna-Barbera Production

== Other appearances ==
- Secret Squirrel appears as a child on Yo Yogi!, voiced by Kath Soucie. He has an uncle named Uncle Undercover (voiced by Greg Burson) who owns the Invention Dimension store in Jellystone Mall.
- Both the original and reboot versions appeared in DC Comics Cartoon Network Presents.
- Secret Squirrel and Morocco Mole appear in Harvey Birdman, Attorney at Law with Secret Squirrel voiced by Bill Farmer and Morocco Mole voiced by Maurice LaMarche. Secret Squirrel first appears in the Season 2 episode "Blackwatch Plaid" as a client of Harvey's arrested for flashing people (a play on Secret's famous trench coat). Secret Squirrel then appeared again in the Season 3 episode "Bird Girl of Guantanamole", hiring Harvey to get Morocco Mole out of the Guantanamo Bay detention camp. Secret Squirrel also has a brief cameo in the series finale "The Death of Harvey".
- Secret Squirrel appeared in the DC Comics book Scooby-Doo! Team-Up #11 in September 2015.
- A "rebooted" version of Secret Squirrel and Morocco Mole was a back-up feature of the DC comic book series Scooby Apocalypse in issues #16-29.
- Secret Squirrel and Morocco Mole made appearances in Jellystone! with both characters voiced by Dana Snyder. In the season 2 episode "It's a Mad Mad Mad Rat Race", Secret Squirrel is seen on a movie poster for a film called "The Blowening" and Morocco Mole runs a sauna-themed restaurant called "Saunas, Sweats & Sandwiches" in response to the fact that people can't eat sandwiches in a sauna. Secret Squirrel physically appears in the season 3 episode "Spy Thriller", along with Penny and The Chief (in his 90s design).

== LP album ==
Hanna-Barbera Records released an LP album called Secret Squirrel and Morocco Mole in Super Spy (HLP-2046) in 1966. It featured an adventure with four songs – "Secret Squirrel" (based on the show's theme song) and "Morocco Mole" on the beginning and the end of Side 1, respectively, and "Agent O Double O" and "Super Spy" on the beginning and the end of Side 2, respectively. Mel Blanc reprised his role as Secret Squirrel, but Daws Butler voiced Morocco Mole instead of Paul Frees.

== Home video ==
The episode "Sub Swiper" is available on the DVD Saturday Morning Cartoons 1960s Vol. 1, as well as a part of the "A Sample of Boomerang" tape, from Cartoon Network's sister channel, Boomerang.

Warner Archive released The Secret Squirrel Show: The Complete Series on DVD in Region 1 as part of their Hanna–Barbera Classics Collection in November 2015. This is a Manufacture-on-Demand (MOD) release, available exclusively through Warner's online store and Amazon.com.

The Secret Squirrel Show: The Complete Series was made available for download via iTunes in August 2016.

Warner Archive released 2 Stupid Dogs/Secret Squirrel Show Volume 1 on DVD in August 2018, which includes all of the first-season episodes of 2 Stupid Dogs and all of the episodes of Super Secret Secret Squirrel. Again, this is a Manufacture-on-Demand (MOD) release, available exclusively through Warner's online store and Amazon.com.

== Cultural influence ==
The phrase "Secret Squirrel stuff" is used by people working in U.S. intelligence to lightheartedly describe material that is highly classified, usually as a non-answer to a question. It may likewise be used in a pejorative manner to mean someone who is unlikely to have actually had a job as a special operations soldier, spy or mercenary, or to have performed the actions they claim to.

The history of the name "Secret Squirrel" for special operations forces and spies appears to predate the television show, as one story states that the word "squirrel" was used during World War II as a shibboleth to root out German spies.

The name "Secret Squirrel" is police slang for an agent of the United States Secret Service.

== See also ==
- List of works produced by Hanna-Barbera Productions
- List of Hanna-Barbera characters
- Operation Senior Surprise – US cruise missile strike during Gulf War, also known as Operation Secret Squirrel
