= Howard Morris =

American actor and director (1919–2005)

- Morris in The Andy Griffith Show, 1964
- Born: Howard Jerome Morris; September 4, 1919; New York City, U.S.
- Died: May 21, 2005 (aged 85); Los Angeles, California, U.S.
- Resting place: Hillside Memorial Park
- Other name: Howie Morris
- Occupations: Actor; comedian; director
- Years active: 1937–2005
- Spouses: Mary Helen McGowan (m. 1945; div. 1962) Dolores A. Wylie (m. 1962; div. 1977)
- Children: 4

Howard Jerome Morris (September 4, 1919 – May 21, 2005) was an American actor, comedian, and director. He was best known for his roles in The Andy Griffith Show as Ernest T. Bass and as Uncle Goopy in a celebrated comedy sketch on Sid Caesar's Your Show of Shows (1954). He did voices for television shows such as The Flintstones (1962-1965), The Jetsons (1962-1987), The Atom Ant Show (1965-1966), Garfield and Friends (1988-1994), and Cow and Chicken (1997-1999).

== Life and career ==
Morris was born to a Jewish family in the Bronx, New York, the son of Hugo and Elsie (née Theobald) Morris. His father was a rubber company executive. Morris attended New York University on a dramatic arts scholarship.

During World War II, he was assigned to a United States Army Special Services unit where he was the First Sergeant. Maurice Evans was the company commander and Carl Reiner and Werner Klemperer were soldiers in the unit. Based in Honolulu, the unit entertained American troops throughout the Pacific.

He came to prominence in appearances on Sid Caesar's Your Show of Shows (a live sketch comedy series appearing weekly in the United States, from 1950 to 1954). In April 1954, Morris joined Caesar and Carl Reiner in "This Is Your Story," an 11-minute takeoff on Ralph Edwards's This Is Your Life. Morris claimed it was his favorite sketch role.

As The New Yorker's David Margolick wrote in 2014,

Though the competition is stiff, many feel that this sketch is the funniest that “Your Show of Shows” ever did...That night nearly sixty years ago, the show produced what is probably the longest and loudest burst of laughter — genuine laughter, neither piped in nor prompted — in the history of television.

Never afraid to have talented people around him, Caesar is actually upstaged here by his second second banana (that is, after Reiner): Howard Morris, who plays Duncey’s long-lost Uncle Goopy, who, overcome with emotion, repeatedly clings to and slobbers over his favorite nephew. Shamelessly milking the moment, Morris throws in all sorts of extra embraces, even clinging to his leg as a lumbering Caesar drags him to the couch. It was a dangerous thing to do, but evidently Morris felt he could do it.

This opinion was shared by The New York Times and Hollywood.com. Conan O'Brien tweeted in 2014: "Saw this Sid Caesar sketch when I was a kid. It made me want to make people laugh." Billy Crystal later called it a defining early influence: "That's how I used to go to bed. I'd grab my dad's leg, and he'd drag me to bed like Sid Caesar." The sketch can be viewed here, Morris enters at the 4:14 mark. He also appeared twice in 1957 in episodes of the short-lived NBC comedy/variety show The Polly Bergen Show. He notably played the wily and over-the-top mountain man character Ernest T. Bass on The Andy Griffith Show. Also, he played George, the TV mechanic in the episode, "Andy and Helen Have Their Day." (He had lampooned southern accents while in the army at Fort Bragg, North Carolina.)

He starred in one of the more comical early hour-long Twilight Zone episodes: "I Dream of Genie." Other roles included that of Elmer Kelp in The Nutty Professor, a movie studio clerk in the short film Star Spangled Salesman, and an art appraiser in an episode of The Dick Van Dyke Show.

He also appeared in several Broadway shows including the highly regarded 1960 revival of Finian's Rainbow as Og the leprechaun opposite Bobby Howes as Finian. He played the role of Schmidlap in Way... Way Out and appeared in the movie Boys' Night Out (1962).

=== Voice acting ===
Morris was first heard in animated cartoons in the early 1960s. He and Allan Melvin teamed up for a 50-episode King Features Syndicate series Beetle Bailey, for which he and Melvin co-wrote a number of episodes. He provided the voices for Gene Deitch's Academy Award-winning Munro, about a four-year-old boy who was drafted into the Army.

Beginning in 1962, Morris played a variety of voices in many Hanna-Barbera series, including The Jetsons as Jet Screamer who sang the "Eep opp ork ah ah!" song, (said to be Morris' first work for Hanna-Barbera) and The Flintstones. He was the original voice of Atom Ant and provided the voice of Mr. Peebles in The Magilla Gorilla Show, teaming again with Allan Melvin who performed the voice for Magilla. In another series, Morris was heard as the voice of Breezly Bruin which was similar in tone with the Bill Scott vocalization of Bullwinkle. Morris had a disagreement with Joseph Barbera before production of the 1966-1967 season of Magilla Gorilla and Atom Ant and all of his voices were recast, mostly using Don Messick. Years later, the two men reconciled, and Morris was back doing these voices and others. He also lent his voice to Forsythe "Jughead" Jones on Filmation's series The Archies through the life of the franchise from 1968 to 1977. He also was the voice of Leonard Blush, "The Masked Singer" - he had a skin condition - as well as the regular voice of the Mount Pilot radio station's host on The Andy Griffith Show.

Morris also voiced the characters Professor Icenstein and Luigi La Bounci in the animated series Galaxy High. He voiced Mayor McCheese and later the Hamburglar (taking over for Larry Storch in 1986) in McDonaldland ad campaign for McDonald's, which Morris also directed. He provided the voice of Wade Duck in the U.S. Acres segments of Garfield and Friends, and voiced Webbly in Bobby's World and Flem in Cow & Chicken. Morris supplied the voice of the koala in TV commercials for Qantas from 1967 through 1992 (saying the tagline "I hate Qantas"), and voiced Gopher in the Disney featurettes Winnie the Pooh and the Honey Tree and Winnie the Pooh and the Blustery Day. Also in 1989, he voiced a French gangster cat named Monte De Zar (Fat Cat's Cousin) in an episode of Disney's Chip 'n Dale: Rescue Rangers episode "Le Purrfect Crime".

He also voiced Squawk in 1992’s Tom and Jerry: The Movie.

=== Voice directing ===
While Morris continued to make himself available for voice and sound effect roles, he also began a new career in voice directing. Among the projects he directed are Police Academy, Richie Rich, Bionic Six, Goin' Coconuts, Pole Position, Galaxy High, The Snorks, The Mighty Orbots, Rose Petal Place, The Dogfather, Dragon's Lair, Tom and Jerry: The Movie, Turbo Teen, Little Clowns of Happytown, Space Stars, and Kidd Video.

=== Directing and later career ===
Morris directed some episodes of The Andy Griffith Show, Gomer Pyle, Hogan's Heroes, The Dick Van Dyke Show, the pilot episode of Get Smart and later, episodes of One Day at a Time, Bewitched, and single episodes of many other comedy shows. He directed Doris Day in her final film With Six You Get Eggroll (1968). Other films he directed were Don't Drink the Water (1969) and Who's Minding the Mint? (1967).

Mel Brooks occasionally cast Morris in his films. For example, he played Brooks' mentor psychiatrist Dr. Lilloman in the comedy High Anxiety (1977), the emperor's court spokesman ("Here, wash this!") in History of the World, Part I (1981), and played a bum named Sailor living in the streets in Life Stinks (1991).

In 1984, he played Dr. Zidell in Splash, a film directed by Ron Howard (the two had first worked together on The Andy Griffith Show). He worked with his old friend and trouping partner Sid Caesar as nervous Jewish tailors in the 1998 movie of Ray Bradbury's The Wonderful Ice Cream Suit.

He appeared on "The Love Boat" (season eight, episode 13) as "has been" comedian Billy Banks in a Christmas-themed vignette "Santa, Santa, Santa.". In 1986, he reprised his famous role as Ernest T. Bass in the highly rated television movie Return to Mayberry. In 1989, he guest-starred on Murder, She Wrote. From 1997 to 1999, he voiced Flem on Cow and Chicken.

== Personal life ==
Morris was married and divorced five times. He was first married to Mary Helen McGowan from 1945 to 1962. He married his second wife, Dolores A. Wylie, later in 1962; the marriage lasted until 1977 when they divorced. During their marriage, Morris appeared as Ernest T. Bass in a 1964 episode of The Andy Griffith Show in which a party is hosted by Mrs. Wiley, which was his wife's maiden name. He had three daughters, Devra Lynn, Kim and Gabrielle, and a son, David, along with three grandchildren.

== Death ==
On May 21, 2005, Morris died of congestive heart failure at the age of 85. At his funeral, the "Uncle Goopy" sketch was shown; among the eulogizers was Carl Reiner, who praised Morris's ability to improvise. He is entombed in Laurel Gardens Wall crypt at Hillside Memorial Park Cemetery in Culver City, California.

== Filmography ==
=== Film ===
- Munro (1961) – narrator
- Boys Night Out (1962) – Howard McIllenny
- 40 Pounds of Trouble (1962) – Julius
- The Nutty Professor (1963) – Elmer Kelp
- Loopy DeLoop (Habit Rabbit) (1963, Short) – Raymond (voice)
- Fluffy (1965) – Sweeney
- Winnie the Pooh and the Honey Tree (1966, Short) – Gopher (voice)
- Alice of Wonderland in Paris (1966) – The Frowning Prince / King (segment "The Frowning Prince") / Grand Wizard (voice)
- Way...Way Out (1966) – Schmidlap
- The Big Mouth (1967) – Cameo Role (uncredited)
- With Six You Get Eggroll (1968) – Hippie in Police Station (uncredited)
- Winnie the Pooh and the Blustery Day (1968, Short) – Gopher (voice)
- Don't Drink the Water (1969) – Getaway Pilot (uncredited)
- The Comic (1969) – Pedestrian Gag Man in Love Honor and Oh Boy (uncredited)
- Daffy Duck and Porky Pig Meet the Groovie Goolies (1972) – Franklin 'Frankie' Frankenstein / Wolfgang 'Wolfie' Wolfman / Mummy / "Hauntleroy" (voice)
- Ten from Your Show of Shows (1973)
- The Many Adventures of Winnie the Pooh (1977) – Gopher (voice) (archive footage)
- High Anxiety (1977) – Professor Lilloman
- History of the World, Part I (1981) – Court Spokesman (The Roman Empire)
- Splash (1984) – Dr. Zidell
- Return to Mayberry (1986, TV Movie) – Ernest T. Bass
- End of the Line (1987) – Hobo
- The Good, the Bad, and Huckleberry Hound (1988, TV Movie) – Mr. Peebles / Chuckling Chipmunk / Governor / Dentist
- Transylvania Twist (1989) – Marinas Orlock
- Life Stinks (1991) – Sailor
- Tom and Jerry: The Movie (1992) – Squawk (voice)
- I Yabba-Dabba Do! (1993, TV Movie) – (voice)
- Hollyrock-a-Bye Baby (1993, TV Movie) – Bird (voice)
- A Flintstones Christmas Carol (1994, TV movie) – (voice)
- Lasting Silents (1997) – Julius Davis
- The Wonderful Ice Cream Suit (1998) – Leo Zellman

=== Television ===
- Your Show of Shows (1950–1954)—various roles
- Caesar's Hour (1954–1957)—various roles
- The Twilight Zone (1963) (Season 4 Episode 12: I Dream of Genie)—George P. Hanley
- Wanted: Dead or Alive (1961) (Episode: "Detour")—Clayton Armstrong
- Alfred Hitchcock Presents (1962) (Season 7 Episode 31: "Most Likely to Succeed")—Dave Sumner
- Thriller (1962) (U.S. TV series) (Season 2 Episode 29: "The Lethal Ladies")
- The Flintstones (1962–1965) – 28 episodes – Doctor / Boy / Pilot / Soldier #1 / Sergeant / Cop / Bird #1 / Mr. Rockhard / Charles / Coach / Cat / Boy #1 / Boy #3 / Rodney Whetstone / Dr. Pilldown / Monkey / Letter Opening Bird / Turtle #2 / Guy in Crowd / Clerk / Kid / Porcupine / The Kissing Burglar / Henry / Cop #1 / Ted Stonevan / Tex Bricker / Filbert / Knitting Kneedle / Chisel Bird / Turtle Butler / Jimmy / Quartz / Member #2 / Member #4 / Ticket Taker / Reporter / Guard / Announcer / Pilot / Traffic Cop / Black Lamb / Eddie / Clam / Turtle / Manager / Customer / Dr. Corset / Brick / Bird / Man #1 / Man #3 / Man #4 / Ollie / Slag / Card Player #2 / Bobby / Announcer / Parrot / Herman / Chimp / Horse / Sam / BirdGeneral / Peter / Al / Mop / Tortoise / Mammoth / Alligator / Detective #2 / Hotrock / Oyster / Traffic Cop #2 / Kid #2 / Monkey #2 / Elmo / Elephant / Lucy / TV Announcer / Cat / Buffalo #3 / Emcee / Bird in Tree / Rockoff / Official / Proprietor / Joe / Tall Detective / Customs Man / Percy / Pa / Slab / Possum / 1st Dinosaur / Attendant / Treasurer / Scotsman / Baggage Monkey / Reggie / Horn Bird / Dragon / Actor / Doc / Jethro Hatrock / Spider / Flower / 'Uncle' / TV Announcer / Weirdly Gruesome / The Kissing Burglar / Slab / Waiter
- The Jetsons (1962–1987) – 14 episodes—Harlan / Bank Security Guard #1 / Traffic Cop / Molecular Motors Video Tailor #2 / Montique Jetson / Nimbus the Great / George's Conscience / Willie / Mr. Tweeter / Emcee / Jet Screamer / Henry Orbit (1 episode) / Boppo Crushstar / CB / Bus Driver
- The Dick Van Dyke Show (1963) (Episode: "The Masterpiece")—Mr. Holdecker
- Beetle Bailey (1963) – Beetle Bailey / General Halftrack / Lieutenant Fuzz / Otto / Chaplain Staneglass / Rocky
- The Andy Griffith Show (1963–1965) (8 episodes) – Ernest T. Bass / Radio Announcer / Leonard Blush / George, the TV Repairman
- Make Room for Daddy (1964) (Episode: "The Leprechaun") – Sean
- The Magilla Gorilla Show (1964–1965) – Mr. Peebles
- Punkin' Puss and Mushmouse (1964–1966) – Mushmouse
- Breezly and Sneezly (1964–1966) – Breezly Bruin
- The Lucy Show (1965) (Season 4 Episode 2: "Lucy and the Golden Greek") – Howie (Lucy's blind date)
- The Secret Squirrel Show (1965) – Additional voices
- The Famous Adventures of Mr. Magoo (1965) – Prince Valor / Flattop / Egeus / Peter Quince / Demetrius
- The Atom Ant Show (1965–1966) – Atom Ant
- Alice in Wonderland or What's a Nice Kid Like You Doing in a Place Like This? (1966) (TV special) – The White Rabbit
- The Archie Show (1968–1978) – Forsythe "Jughead" Jones, "Big Moose" Mason and Dilton Doiley
- The Banana Splits in Hocus Pocus Park (1972) – Hocus / Pocus
- My Favorite Martians (1973) – Tim O'Hara / Bill Brennan / Brad Brennan / Okey / Chump
- The Love Boat (1978) – Cruise ship passenger / Stand-up comedian
- The Plastic Man Comedy/Adventure Show (1979) – Doctor Dome
- Legends of the Superheroes (1979) (2 TV specials) – The Challenge and The Roast – Dr. Sivana
- Fantasy Island (1980–1983) (2 episodes)
- Shirt Tales (1982) – Shutter McBugg
- Trapper John, M.D. (1982–1984) (5 episodes) – Dr. Jerry Hannigan / Dr. Kauffman
- Alvin and the Chipmunks (1983) – Additional voices
- Deck the Halls with Wacky Walls (1983) (TV special) – Crazylegs
- The Yellow Rose (1984) (Episode: "Sport of Kings") – Johnny Hogan
- The 13 Ghosts of Scooby-Doo (1985) – Bogel / Platypus Duck
- Star Fairies (1985) (TV special) – Dragon Head #1
- Snorks (1985) – Additional voices
- Paw Paws (1985–1986) – Trembly Paw
- The Flintstone Kids (1986–1988) – Additional voices
- Galaxy High (1986) – Professor Icenstein / Luigi La Bounci
- Sesame Street (1986–1993) (4 episodes) – Jughead Jones
- Adventures of the Gummi Bears (1987) – Sir Paunch
- DuckTales (1987–1989) – Dr. Von Swine / Happy Jack / Additional voices
- Little Clowns of Happytown – Mr. Pickleherring
- Popeye and Son – Bandini the Genie
- Superman (1988) (Episode: "Triple-Play/The Circus") – Prankster / Oswald Loomis
- The New Yogi Bear Show (1988) – Additional voices
- Fantastic Max (1988–1989) – Additional voices
- Police Academy (1988–1989) – Sweetchuck
- Garfield and Friends (1988–1994) (121 episodes) – Wade Duck / Fox / Wart / Worm / Wolf / additional voices
- The Further Adventures of SuperTed (1989) – Polka Face
- The Adventures of Ronald McDonald: McTreasure Island (1989) (Video Short) – Hamburglar / Ben Gunn
- Murder, She Wrote (1989) (Episode: "Something Borrowed, Someone Blue") – Uncle Ziggy
- Midnight Patrol: Adventures in the Dream Zone (1990) – Dr. Akenhoffer
- Chip 'n Dale: Rescue Rangers (1990) – Maltese de Sade
- Yo Yogi! (1991) – Murray / Additional voices
- TaleSpin (1991) – Chief of Mondo Bondo / King Amok / Radio Announcer 2 / 18th Class Postal Clerk
- Dumb and Dumber (1995) – Daddy / Old Man #2
- Duckman (1996) — Ernest T. Glob
- Cow and Chicken (1997–1999) – Flem / P.A. Announcer / Goon / Man 3 (2) / Man 3 (10) / Paramedic / Cootie Victim 1 / Intercom Voice / Pig / Kid (5) / Peasant (3) / General 1 / Peasant (4) / Kid 3 (4) / Man (6)
- Baywatch (1996) – Fella/Arthur
- I Am Weasel (1997–2000) – Additional voices
- The Wild Thornberrys (1999) – Lion #1 / Zebra
- All Grown Up! (2004) – Doctor

=== Video games ===
- Cartoon Network Racing (2006) - Flem (posthumous release; final role)

=== As director ===
- The Dick Van Dyke Show (1963–1965) – 5 episodes – The Ballad of the Betty Lou / A Nice, Friendly Game of Cards / Scratch My Car and Die / The Return of Edwin Carp / The Case of the Pillow
- The Andy Griffith Show (1964) – 8 episodes – Barney's Bloodhound / The Darling Baby / Andy and Helen Have Their Day / Three Wishes for Opie / Otis Sues the County / My Fair Ernest T. Bass / Barney's Physical / Family Visit
- Get Smart (1965) – episode – Mr. Big
- The Patty Duke Show (1965)
- Bewitched (1965–1966) – 3 episodes - We're in for a Bad Spell / Junior Executive / Prodigy
- Hogan's Heroes (1965–1967) – 14 episodes
- A Secret Agent's Dilemma, or A Clear Case of Mind Over Mata Hari (1965) – TV movie
- Good Old Days (1966) — TV movie
- Laredo (1966) – episode – That's Noway, Thataway
- Who's Minding the Mint? (1967)
- With Six You Get Eggroll (1968)
- Don't Drink the Water (1969)
- Laverne & Shirley (1977) – episode – Frank's Fling
- Goin' Coconuts (1978)
- The Beatrice Arthur Special (1980) – TV movie
- The Love Boat (1981) – Season 4 Episode 14 From Here to Maternity / Jealousy / The Trigamist
- Trapper John, M.D. (1985–1986) – 2 episodes – Billboard Barney & Life, Death and Dr. Christmas
