= Yo Yogi! =

American animated television series

- Genre: Adventure; Comedy; Mystery
- Created by: William Hanna; Joseph Barbera
- Directed by: Don Lusk; Paul Sommer; Carl Urbano; Jay Sarbry; Joanna Romersa
- Voices of: Greg Burson; Greg Berg; Don Messick; Rob Paulsen; Kath Soucie; John Stephenson
- Theme music composer: Joseph Curiale
- Opening theme: "Yo Yogi Yo!"
- Ending theme: "Yo Yogi Yo!" (Instrumental)
- Composer: Jonathan Wolff
- Country of origin: United States
- Original language: English
- No. of episodes: 13 (19 segments)

Production
- Executive producers: William Hanna; Joseph Barbera
- Producer: Cos Anzilotti
- Editors: Gil Iverson; Tim Iverson
- Running time: 30 minutes
- Production company: Hanna-Barbera Productions

Original release
- Network: NBC
- Release: September 14 – December 7, 1991

Yo Yogi! is an American animated television series, and the seventh entry in the Yogi Bear franchise, produced by Hanna-Barbera Productions that aired from September 14 to December 7, 1991, on NBC for 13 episodes.

== Synopsis ==
Taking place in Jellystone Town, the show features Yogi Bear and other popular Hanna-Barbera characters, depicted as teenage crime fighters. The team includes Yogi's friends Boo-Boo Bear, Huckleberry Hound, Snagglepuss, and Yogi's girlfriend Cindy Bear. The gang hang out at Jellystone Mall owned by "Diamond" Doggie Daddy, with Augie Doggie depicted as his heir to the mall business. Yogi and the gang work at an agency called L.A.F. (short for Lost and Found), where they act as detectives trying to solve mysteries under the supervision of the mall's security guard Officer Smith. Dickie Dastardly and his sidekick Muttley would cause trouble for Yogi and his gang. The show also introduced a teenage bear named Roxey Bear who was Cindy's rival and Yogi's competitor, as well as news reporter Chuck Toupée. The characters were never seen at home or school.

Some of Yogi's other pals like Secret Squirrel, Hardy Har Har, and Squiddly Diddly were also featured as young teens.

Other Hanna-Barbera characters are still in adult form: Hokey Wolf is the Mayor of Jellystone Town and Ding-A-Ling Wolf is his photographer, Loopy De Loop works at the Jellystone Mall's Picnic Basket Food Court, Atom Ant served as Jellystone Town's superhero, Quick Draw McGraw and Baba Looey were wild west-themed entertainers, Pixie and Dixie live in Mr. Jinks' cheese store, Lippy the Lion owns "The Precious Jams and Gems Store", Peter Potamus and So-So ran a plant shop called "Peter Potamus' Plant Palace", Snooper is a crime-solving celebrity while Blabber ran the "Crooks 'n' Books" store, Magilla Gorilla appeared as a teen idol in "Jellystone Jam" as Magilla Ice (a takeoff of Vanilla Ice), and Mr. Peebles owns his pet store. Also, Granny Sweet made an appearance in the episode "Super Duper Snag" and "Barely Working".

== Production ==
Yo Yogi! featured episodes, or parts of episodes, in 3D, with Kellogg's Rice Krispies offering 3D glasses. Generally, the 3D scenes were chase scenes of the variety made famous by Hanna-Barbera in the Scooby-Doo series. At the beginning of these 3D sequences, Yogi would spin his hat atop his head, as a cue to viewers to don their 3D glasses.

On March 6, 1992, in response to the success of its Saturday morning live-action teen sitcom Saved by the Bell, NBC announced the cancellation of its entire Saturday morning block of cartoons (including Yo Yogi!), which would be replaced that fall with a new block of live-action shows targeting teenagers in addition to a Saturday edition of The Today Show. Yo Yogi! last aired in syndication as part of The Funtastic World of Hanna-Barbera, before resurfacing on cable network Boomerang from October 30, 2023 to June 28, 2024. As of December 2024, the series currently airs on MeTV Toons.

The first few episodes used digital ink and paint, while the next few episodes used cel animation.

Modern voice actors voiced the voices of certain characters not only because some of them are teenagers, but due to the deaths of Daws Butler, Mel Blanc, and Paul Frees before this series began.

== Episodes ==
No.	Title	Written by	Original release date
1	"Yo, Yogi!"	Sean Roche	September 14, 1991
In this origin story, the Jellystone Mall has been opened and Yogi and his friends go there at the time when an invisible bandit strikes Jellystone Town. When Dick Dastardly and Muttley get their hands on a clue, they end up flying off with Yogi in hot pursuit leading them to Bombastic Bobby's Bargain Barn as part of his plan to run Jellystone Mall out of business. With the help of his friends, Yogi manages to stop Bombastic Bobby and gain jobs at the mall's Lost & Found Detective Agency.
2a	"Huck's Doggone Day"	Bob Kushell and Steve Smith	September 21, 1991
Two criminals named Lou and Murray have escaped from Jellystone Prison and discovered that the area that they buried their loot in 50 years ago is where Jellystone Mall stands today. When they get to the elm tree there, Huckleberry Hound is under it unwinding causing Lou and Murray to try various ways to get rid of him with disastrous results.
2b	"Grindhog Day"	Earl Kress	September 21, 1991
Two Grindhogs have infiltrated Jellystone Mall and are eating the mall's profits and Cindy Bear won't let anyone exterminate them since they're on the Endangered Species list. When they get to their Pickleyberry Patch habitat in Jellystone Park, Yogi, Cindy, and Snagglepuss stumble upon an abandoned underground mine shaft and discover that a criminal called Max the Mole is going to break into the First Jellystone Bank.
3	"Jellystone Jam"	Gordon Bressack	September 28, 1991
Magilla Ice is in town to give a performance at Jellystone Mall and Doggie Daddy is holding a contest where the winner will spend the day with Magilla Ice. Roxy rigs the name drawing so that she can win the day with Magilla Ice. When Cindy Bear's name is drawn, Roxy teams up with Dick Dastardly and Muttley to make sure that Magilla Ice spends the day with her.
4	"Mall Alone"	Charles M. Howell IV	October 5, 1991
Snagglepuss ends up locked in the mall, hours after closing time when he falls asleep while watching a movie. Yogi, Boo Boo, Cindy, and Huckleberry end up trying to break in to save him at the same time when two robbers named Homer Fly and Pop Fly attempt to steal the Rusty Diamond baseball card. Now all through the night, it is up to Snagglepuss to overcome his huge fear of the dark for good and to stop the robbers.
5	"Tricky Dickie's Dirty Trickies"	David Ehrman	October 12, 1991
After the L.A.F. Squad recovers a man's toupee after it was accidentally blown off by Peter Potamus' goldenrod allergies, Dick Dastardly plots to become leader of the L.A.F. Squad by getting rid of Yogi. When he does succeed by framing him for the wallet thefts, Yogi ends up being removed from the L.A.F. Squad and ends up hanging out with Hardy Har Har. Meanwhile, Mr. Slump and his assistant Leroy plot to kidnap Augie Doggie and hold him for ransom.
6	"Super Duper Snag"	Gordon Bressack	October 19, 1991
A giant cockroach called the Pest is at large in Jellystone Town with plans to rule the world. Atom Ant ends up losing his Atomic Helmet which Snagglepuss mistakes for a pinkie ring. With it, Snagglepuss becomes a superhero. Atom Ant ends up seeking help from the other L.A.F. Squad members to find his Atomic Helmet before the Pest conquers the world.
7a	"Mellow Fellow"	Sindy McKay	October 26, 1991
While the others are at the Picnic Basket, Huckleberry Hound helps the parents of Wee Willie Gorilla find their son in exchange for a reward. Dick Dastardly and Muttley also get involved in finding Wee Willy.
7b	"Hats Off to Yogi"	Bob Kushell and Steve Smith	October 26, 1991
Workers and patrons to Jellystone Mall are ending up having their hair shaved off by a mysterious Clipper at the same time Yogi loses his hat. Even without his hat, Yogi and Boo Boo end up finding the identity of the Clipper in Moe and Joe Wendell in the Mops 'N' Tops wig store.
8	"Polly Want a Safe Cracker"	Charlie Howell	November 2, 1991
An evil parrot called the Birdbrain of Alcatraz is in Jellystone Town cracking every safe in town. It is up to Yogi, Boo Boo, and Secret Squirrel to stop him. Meanwhile, Mayor Hokey Wolf is visited by important people, where he gives them a tour of Jellystone Town.
9a	"Mall or Nothing"	Earl Kress	November 9, 1991
Taking advantage while Doggie Daddy goes to a mall owner convention, a con man named Howie Cheatem tricks Augie Doggie into signing Jellystone mall to him. Now Augie seeks help from L.A.F.
9b	"There's No Business Like Snow Business"	Gordon Bressack	November 9, 1991
The L.A.F. squad sets out to stop the Abdominal Snowdude from threatening skiers at Jellystone Mall's Mount Whatsa-Matterhorn. They discover that it is just a robot built by two surfers named Dapp and Schnepper.
10a	"It's All Relative"	Sheryl Scraborough & Kayte Kuch	November 16, 1991
Yogi's uncle Bruno visits just as a villain called the Mad Painter begins a rampage in the mall.
10b	"Barely Working"	Gordon Bressack	November 16, 1991
Yogi tries on a variety of the second jobs to supplement his income while contending with the criminal activity of Grant Larceny and Ralph Larceny.
11a	"Yippee Yo, Yogi!"	Charlie Howell	November 23, 1991
Quick Draw McGraw and Baba Louie are doing a show at Jellystone Mall when Dick Dastardly releases Quick Draw's pet bull Bully in the mall. It is up to the L.A.F. Squad to find him and calm down the bull for the Wild West Show.
11b	"Of Meeces and Men"	Rich Fogel and Mike Seidenberg	November 23, 1991
Mr. Jinks runs Mr. Jinks' Cheese Cottage and has had enough of Pixie and Dixie stealing his cheese. Dick Dastardly tells Mr. Jinks that he can teach him to be a bully to "muscle out" Pixie and Dixie. Yogi helps the two and shows Mr. Jinks that being a bully is not the way to do business and must come up with a better solution while also contending with Dick Dastardly and Muttley.
12a	"Fashion Smashin'!"	Bob Kushell and Steve Smith	November 30, 1991
Calvin Clunk is in town to reveal his latest fashion designs. His rival Talula LeTrend plots to steal a dress that is the centerpiece of his fashion show at the same time Roxey helps Cindy with her fashion. When Talula does steal it, she ends up mixing it with a copy of Roxey's outfit style.
12b	"To Tell the Truth, Forsooth"	Bob Kushell and Steve Smith	November 30, 1991
Snagglepuss is sent on a mission to return the bust of William Shakesbear to Aunt Annie's Antique Antiquarium. When he ends up losing it at the Imovieplex movie theater, he fakes that he's been knocked out and robbed of the statue with the evidence being that Dick Dastardly stole the bust.
13	"The Big Snoop"	Earl Kress	December 7, 1991
Super Snooper (alongside his press agent P.R. Flack) is in town for a book signing at the Crooks 'n' Books store and he's holding a mystery contest. When the L.A.F. Squad are following the clues, Dick Dastardly and Muttley try to ruin their hopes only to go on winning the contest. Meanwhile, Super Snooper ends up kidnapped. Yogi and his friends try to locate him and find out that his kidnapper is his own press agent.

== Voice cast ==
- Charlie Adler - Dap (in "There's No Business Like Snow Business")
- Lewis Arquette – Bombastic Bobby (in "Yo, Yogi!")
- Greg Berg – Huckleberry Hound, Moe Wendell (in "Hats Off to Yogi"), Joe Wendell (in "Hats Off to Yogi")
- Charlie Brill -
- Greg Burson – Yogi Bear, Quick Draw McGraw, Snagglepuss, Mr. Jinks, Peter Potamus, Officer Smith, Uncle Undercover (in "Grindhog Day")
- Bernard Erhard – The Pest (in "Super Duper Snag")
- Pat Fraley – Mad Painter (in "It's All Relative")
- Pat Harrington Jr. – William Shakesbear (in "To Tell the Truth, Forsooth")
- Matt Hurwitz – Hokey Wolf
- Arte Johnson – Lou (in "Huck's Doggone Day")
- John Kassir - Loopy De Loop (voice, uncredited)
- Nancy Linari -
- Danny Mann -
- Gail Matthius – Roxy Bear
- Mitzi McCall – Talula LaTrane (in "Fashion Smashin'")
- Allan Melvin – Magilla "Ice" Gorilla
- Don Messick – Boo-Boo Bear, Muttley, Pixie, Squiddly Diddly, Atom Ant, Umbrella Owner (in "Mall Alone"), Pierre (in "Hats Off to Yogi")
- Howard Morris – Murray (in "Huck's Doggone Day")
- Roger Nolan -
- Rob Paulsen – Hardy Har Har, Dickie Dastardly, Super Snooper, Chuck Toupée, Maitre'd (in "Yo, Yogi!"), Wee Willie Gorilla (in "Mellow Fellows"), Birdbrain of Alcatraz (in "Polly Want a Safe Cracker"), Robin Hood (in "Huck's Doggone Day"), Announcer (in "Fashion Smashin'!")
- Henry Polic II – P.R. Flack (in "The Big Snoop")
- Neil Ross – Baba Looey
- Ronnie Schell – Lippy the Lion, Calvin Klunk (in "Fashion Smashin'")
- Hal Smith – Blabber Mouse
- Kath Soucie – Cindy Bear, Granny Sweet (in "Super Duper Snag"), Secret Squirrel, Mother (in "Super Duper Snag"), Baby (in "Super Duper Snag"), Jellystone Mall Patron (in "Of Meeces and Men")
- John Stephenson – "Diamond" Doggie Daddy, Guard (in "Mall Alone"), Bruno Bear (in "It's All Relative"), Mr. Myopic (in "To Tell the Truth, Forsooth")
- Sally Struthers -
- B.J. Ward -
- Lennie Weinrib – Max the Mole (in "Grindhog Day")
- Frank Welker – Robotic Dog (in "Mall Alone"), Zombies (in "Mall Alone"), Howie Cheatem (in "Mall or Nothing"), Bully the Bull (in "Yippee Yo, Yogi"!), China Choice Owner (in "Yippee Yo, Yogi"!)
- Patric Zimmerman – Augie Doggie, Dixie, Ding-A-Ling Wolf

== Home media ==
In late 1991, a VHS release of the show came with 3D glasses. It was available on iTunes as part of the Hanna-Barbera Diamond Collection. The complete series was formerly available on the Boomerang streaming service until its shuttering in 2024.

== See also ==
- List of works produced by Hanna-Barbera Productions
- The Yogi Bear Show
- The New Yogi Bear Show
- Yogi's Treasure Hunt
- Yogi's Gang
- Yogi's Space Race
- Galaxy Goof-Ups
