= Hanna-Barbera's All-Star Comedy Ice Revue =

1978 American live-action/animated television special

- Genre: Television special
- Written by: Dick Robbins; Duane Poole; Jay Burton
- Directed by: Walter C. Miller
- Presented by: Roy Clark; Bonnie Franklin
- Voices of: Henry Corden; Mel Blanc; Daws Butler; Paul Winchell; Allan Melvin; Don Messick
- Music by: Hoyt Curtin
- Country of origin: United States
- Original language: English

Production
- Executive producers: Joseph Barbera; William Hanna
- Producer: Walt deFaria
- Production locations: Bakersfield Civic Auditorium; Bakersfield, California
- Editor: John Carnochan
- Running time: 60 minutes
- Production companies: Hanna-Barbera Productions deFaria Productions

Original release
- Network: CBS
- Release: January 13, 1978

Related
- A Flintstone Christmas; The Flintstones: Little Big League

Hanna-Barbera's All-Star Comedy Ice Revue (onscreen title: Hanna-Barbera's All-Star Comedy Ice Review) is a 1978 American live-action/animated television special produced by Hanna-Barbera Productions (in association with deFaria Productions) featuring animated character Fred Flintstone and hosted by Roy Clark and Bonnie Franklin in celebration of Hanna-Barbera's twenty years on the airwaves. It premiered on CBS on Friday, January 13, 1978, at 8:00 pm EST.

== Summary ==
The show was a celebrity roast honoring Fred Flintstone on his 48th birthday, and included the following costumed Hanna-Barbera characters: Yogi Bear, Jabberjaw, Huckleberry Hound, Scooby-Doo, The Banana Splits, Hong Kong Phooey, Quick Draw McGraw, Snagglepuss, Wally Gator and The Hair Bear Bunch.

The special guest stars were Roy Clark and Bonnie Franklin, and included guest stars The Sylvers, British comedy duo Course & Young (Mike Course and Bob Young), the Fenton kids (Jack, Robin, Todd and Lisa), Sashi Kuchiki, the Ice Capettes and a special appearance by The Skatebirds (whose Saturday morning series was airing on CBS at the time). Throughout the special, the live-action celebrity roast sequences are interspersed with animated segments featuring Fred Flintstone and Barney Rubble.

When Clark and Franklin announce the guest of honor, Fred and Barney are at home watching the event on TV. Fred suddenly realizes he thought the event was scheduled for the following night. As Fred and Barney rush to the ice arena, the show continues with musical numbers, ice displays including a comedy team, precision skating, disco-on-ice, jazz skating and an acrobatic number with fiery torches. When a costumed Fred finally arrives, the guests perform a "Happy Birthday" salute.

== Musical numbers ==
- "You Are My Lucky Star" – Performed by Bonnie Franklin
- "We're in the Money" – Performed by the Ice Capettes
- "Disco Showdown" – Performed by The Sylvers
- "Theme from Love Story" – Performed by Roy Clark (guitar solo)

== Voices ==
- Henry Corden – Fred Flintstone
- Mel Blanc – Barney Rubble
- Daws Butler – Hair Bear, Huckleberry Hound, Snagglepuss, Yogi Bear, Quick Draw McGraw, Bingo
- William Callaway – Square Bear
- Paul Winchell – Bubi Bear, Fleegle
- Allan Melvin – Drooper
- Don Messick – Scooter the Penguin
- Frank Welker - Jabberjaw

== Home media ==
Hanna-Barbera's All-Star Comedy Ice Revue has never been rebroadcast on television but was released on VHS in November 1986 by Worldvision Home Video.
