= Exit, Stage Left!: The Snagglepuss Chronicles =

2018 comic book

- Issue #1 cover

Publication information
- Publisher: DC Comics
- Schedule: Monthly
- Publication date: 3 January 2018 - 6 June 2018
- No. of issues: 6
- Main character(s): Snagglepuss; Huckleberry Hound; Quick Draw McGraw
- ISSN: 2691-056X

Creative team
- Written by: Mark Russell
- Artist: Mike Feehan

Collected editions
- Paperback: ISBN 9781401275211

Exit, Stage Left!: The Snagglepuss Chronicles is a satirical comic book, published by DC Comics, that reimagines the Hanna-Barbera cartoon character Snagglepuss as a gay playwright in the 1950s being victimized under McCarthyism. The comics make regular reference to real-life events and historical figures, including subplots about the blacklisting of Dorothy Parker and Lillian Hellman, Marilyn Monroe's affair with Arthur Miller, the execution of Julius and Ethel Rosenberg, and the testing of the first hydrogen bomb.

== Plot ==
Snagglepuss is a playwright from Mississippi (loosely based on Tennessee Williams) who has just written The Heart is a Kennel of Thieves, a Broadway play that has been met with critical acclaim. He is involved in a lavender marriage with the leading actress of his play, Lila Lion, though he spends most of his time with his Cuban boyfriend Pablo. Snagglepuss's follow-up to The Kennel is a Heart of Thieves is the play A Dog's Life, based on the life of his close childhood friend and closeted gay novelist Huckleberry Hound. Huckleberry's marriage ended after he was caught having an affair with a man, and he moved to New York City for a fresh start. Snagglepuss introduces him to the Stonewall bar, where he meets the police officer Quick Draw McGraw. Along with spending time at Stonewall and attending rehearsals of his new play, Snagglepuss also makes regular visits to an old judge at a retirement home who expresses distaste for the theater. The judge laments that his son abandoned him and broke his wife's heart, causing her early death; it is eventually revealed that the judge is Snagglepuss's own estranged father.

Because of the perceived subversive nature of his work, Snagglepuss is targeted by the House Un-American Activities Committee (HUAC). During his first hearing, he is accused of being a communist, but the HUAC is unable to provide sufficient evidence to take concrete action against him. In order to further crack down on subversiveness in the theater, the HUAC brings in a new member, Gigi Allen (loosely based on Roy Cohn). Though Allen, a closeted lesbian, secretly lives with her girlfriend, she insists that the HUAC must target Communism by eliminating what she presents as deviant elements in show business, including homosexuality. She suggests that arresting Snagglepuss will act as an effective warning to other so-called "deviants" in the theater industry. To put her plan in action, she confronts the New York City Police Department about the bribes they are taking from Stonewall and threatens to expose their corruption unless they conduct a raid and publicly disgrace Snagglepuss. During the raid, Quick Draw McGraw is confronted by Huckleberry Hound and beats him to avoid being outed. Though Snagglepuss is not at Stonewall that night, Huckleberry is arrested and outed by the press. After he is released from jail, he hangs himself.

Snagglepuss is distraught over Huckleberry Hound's death, as well as Pablo's decision to return to Cuba and fight in the Cuban Revolution. He openly condemns the HUAC at his next hearing and is blacklisted as a result. Five years later, Snagglepuss is unable to find work. He unexpectedly reunites with Quick Draw McGraw, who explains that he was outed and kicked off the police force some time after the raid on Stonewall and is now working in cartoons. He offers a job to Snagglepuss, who accepts and suggests he also hire Huckleberry Jr. Junior takes the job and says he will use his father's name.

== Reception ==
The comic book received a mostly positive reception from critics. The series won a GLAAD Media Award for Outstanding Comic Book.
