= The Atom Ant/Secret Squirrel Show =

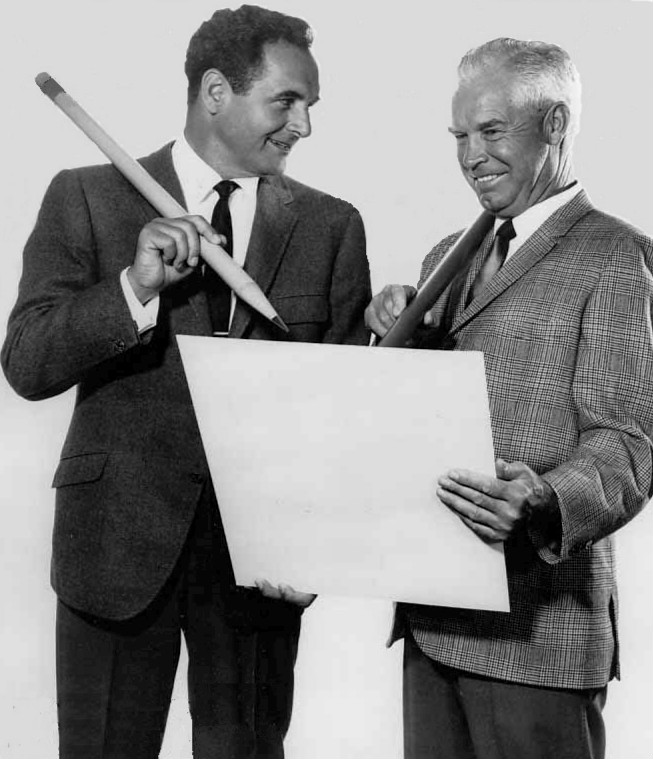
- Photo of Bill Hanna (right) and Joe Barbera (left) from a television special for the premiere of their new Atom Ant and Secret Squirrel television program.
- Genre: Comedy; Adventure
- Written by: Michael Maltese; Dalton Sandifer; Warren Foster; Tony Benedict
- Directed by: William Hanna; Joseph Barbera
- Voices of: Don Messick; Paul Frees; Jean Vander Pyl; Henry Corden; Janet Waldo; Howard Morris; Mel Blanc; John Stephenson
- Composers: William Hanna; Joseph Barbera; Ted Nichols; Hoyt Curtin (uncredited)
- Country of origin: United States
- Original language: English
- No. of seasons: 2
- No. of episodes: 26

Production
- Executive producers: William Hanna; Joseph Barbera
- Running time: 30 minutes
- Production company: Hanna-Barbera Productions

Original release
- Network: NBC
- Release: October 2, 1965 – September 7, 1967

The Atom Ant/Secret Squirrel Show is an hour-long American Saturday morning cartoon produced by Hanna-Barbera Productions from 1965 to 1967 for NBC.

In 1965, the show aired as two independent half-hour programs. The Atom Ant Show featured the tiny superhero Atom Ant, with additional segments The Hillbilly Bears and Precious Pupp. The Secret Squirrel Show features the master spy Secret Squirrel, backed up with Squiddly Diddly and Winsome Witch. In the winter, the shows combine into an hour-long format, The Atom Ant/Secret Squirrel Show. For the series' final NBC run under the Atom Ant/Secret Squirrel title, the show was a half-hour long.

== Voices ==
- Don Messick as Atom Ant (Season two), Ferocious Flea, Mr. Muto, Narrator, Precious Pupp, Shag Rugg
- Paul Frees as Morocco Mole, Double-Q, Yellow Pinkie, Hi-Spy, Claude Hopper, Squiddly Diddly
- Jean Vander Pyl as Maw Rugg, Floral Rugg, Winsome Witch
- Henry Corden as Paw Rugg
- Janet Waldo as Granny Sweet
- Howard Morris as Atom Ant (Season one), Muscles' Boss
- Mel Blanc as Secret Squirrel, Bowling Champion, Officer Smith
- John Stephenson as Narrator, Chief Winchley
- Allan Melvin as Muscles, Big Fats Dynamo, Professor Von Gimmick, Little Mousey, Ali Cat, The Toadstool, additional voices
- Ted Cassidy as Opening Announcer (uncredited)

Other voices include Dick Beals, Gerry Johnson, and Hal Smith.

== Production ==
On September 12, 1965, the series had an hour-long primetime preview on NBC called The World of Secret Squirrel and Atom Ant or The World of Atom Ant and Secret Squirrel.

The Hillbilly Bears cartoon segments repeated during the second season of The Banana Splits Adventure Hour (1969–1970), and all 52 Atom Ant and Secret Squirrel half-hour episodes were syndicated as part of The Banana Splits and Friends Show, an umbrella title for a package combining episodes of several different Hanna-Barbera series (the other series included The Banana Splits Adventure Hour, The New Adventures of Huckleberry Finn and The Adventures of Gulliver).

== Segments ==
The program contains six segments:

- Atom Ant: A cartoon about a superheroic ant (voiced by Howard Morris, later Don Messick). When he flew, he uses his catchphrase "Up and at'em, Atom Ant!"
- The Hillbilly Bears: A situation comedy (inspired by The Beverly Hillbillies) about the Rugg family of hillbilly bears consisting of Paw Rugg (voiced by Henry Corden), Maw Rugg (voiced by Jean Vander Pyl), Floral Rugg (also voiced by Jean Vander Pyl), and Shag Rugg (voiced by Don Messick).
- Precious Pupp: A cartoon about a mischievous dog (voiced by Don Messick) and his elderly lady mistress Granny Sweet (voiced by Janet Waldo). He is characterized by a sneaky, wheezy laugh, making him a possible precursor to Muttley from 1968's Wacky Races and one of its two spin-offs, 1969's Dastardly and Muttley in Their Flying Machines.
- Secret Squirrel and Morocco Mole: The adventures of a secret agent squirrel (voiced by Mel Blanc) and his trusty assistant Morocco Mole (voiced by Paul Frees).
- Squiddly Diddly: A cartoon about a friendly anthropomorphic squid (voiced by Paul Frees) in his quest for stardom while trying to avoid being foiled by Chief Winchley (voiced by John Stephenson).
- Winsome Witch: A cartoon about a friendly yet inept witch named Winsome W. Witch (the "W" stands for Wacky) (voiced by Jean Vander Pyl). Winnie's catchphrase when casting a spell is "Ippity - Pippity - Pow!".

=== Characters ===
==== Atom Ant ====
Atom Ant (voiced by Howard Morris)

==== The Hillbilly Bears ====
Paw Rugg (voiced by Henry Corden)

Maw Rugg (voiced by Jean Vander Pyl)

Floral Rugg (voiced by Jean Vander Pyl)

Shag Rugg (voiced by Don Messick)

==== Precious Pupp ====
Precious Pupp (voiced by Don Messick)

Granny Sweet (voiced by Janet Waldo)

==== Secret Squirrel and Morocco Mole ====
Secret Squirrel (voiced by Mel Blanc)

Morocco Mole (voiced by Paul Frees)

==== Squiddly Diddly ====
Squiddly Diddly (voiced by Paul Frees)

Chief Winchley (voiced by John Stephenson)

==== Winsome Witch ====
Winsome Witch (voiced by Jean Vander Pyl)

== See also ==
- List of works produced by Hanna-Barbera Productions
- List of Hanna-Barbera characters
- Secret Squirrel
