= Breezly and Sneezly =

American animated television series

Breezly and Sneezly is a Hanna-Barbera cartoon series first broadcast on September 16, 1964, as part of The Peter Potamus Show. From 1964 to 1966, 23 episodes were produced, 14 of which were aired on Peter Potamus with the remaining nine aired on The Magilla Gorilla Show.

== Plot ==
Breezly Bruin (voiced by Howard Morris) is a comical, resourceful, polar bear, much like Yogi Bear himself and Barney Rubble based upon Ed Norton from The Honeymooners. His friend is Sneezly Seal (voiced by Mel Blanc), a droopy green seal with a perpetual cold whose sneezes pack devastating power. They live in an igloo in the Arctic. Many of their episodes deal with Breezly's ambitious yet ultimately doomed plans to break into the local army camp for various reasons while trying to stay one step ahead of the army camp's leader Colonel Fuzzby (voiced by John Stephenson).

== Episode list ==
1. No Place Like Nome
2. All Riot on the Northern Front
3. Missile Fizzle
4. Mass Masquerade
5. Furry Furlough
6. Bruin Ruin
7. Freezing Fleas
8. Stars and Gripes
9. Armoured Amour
10. As the Snow Flies
11. Snow Biz
12. Unseen Trouble
13. Nervous in the Service
14. Birthday Bonanza
15. Wacky Waikiki
16. General Nuisance
17. Rookie Wrecker
18. Noodnick of the North
19. The Fastest Bear in the North
20. Snow Time Show Time
21. Goat A-Go-Go
22. Spy in the Ointment
23. An Ill Wind

== Cast ==
- Howard Morris - Breezly Bruin
- Mel Blanc - Sneezly Seal
- John Stephenson - Colonel Fuzzby

== DVD release ==
The episode "All Riot On The Northern Front" is available on the DVD Saturday Morning Cartoons 1960's vol. 1. Saturday Morning Cartoons 1960's vol. 2 has the episode "Missile Fizzle".

Breezly and Sneezly segments are on the MOD release of the complete Peter Potamus Series.

== Other appearances ==
- Animatronics of Breezly and Sneezly can be seen among the animatronic Hanna-Barbera characters in the Dexter's Laboratory episode "Chubby Cheese" during Chubby's song.
- Breezly made a cameo in the Harvey Birdman, Attorney at Law episode "Juror in Court".
- Sneezly made a cameo in the Jellystone! Season 3 episode "Lil' Honk Honks". Breezly and Sneezly both made a cameo in the episode "Snowdodio".
