= Quick Draw McGraw =

American animated television character

- Quick Draw McGraw character
- First appearance: "Lamb Chopped" (1959)
- Created by: William Hanna; Joseph Barbera
- Voiced by: Daws Butler (1959–1988); Gilbert Mack/Don Elliot (Quick Draw McGraw and Huckleberry Hound LP (1959)); Chuck McCann (Wake Up, America! LP (1965)); Greg Burson (1989–2002); Jeff Bergman (Cartoon Network bumpers; 1994, 2000–present); Earl Kress (Hanna-Barbera Cartoon Sound FX (1994)); Maurice LaMarche (Harvey Birdman: Attorney At Law); Seth Green (Robot Chicken); Scott Innes (2003, 2012); Tom Kenny (Class of 3000); Billy West (Wacky Races); Bernardo de Paula (Jellystone!)

In-universe information
- Aliases: The Whip; El Kabong
- Species: Horse
- Gender: Male
- Occupation: Sheriff
- Family: Ma McGraw (mother)
- Children: Quick Draw McGraw Jr. (son)

Quick Draw McGraw is the protagonist and title character of The Quick Draw McGraw Show. An anthropomorphic white horse wearing a red Stetson cowboy hat, a red holster belt, a light blue bandana, and occasionally spurs, he was originally voiced mainly by Daws Butler from 1959 until his death in 1988. All 45 of his cartoons that originally aired between 1959 and 1961 were written by Michael Maltese, known best for his work at the Warner Bros. cartoon studio. The cartoon was nominated for an Emmy Award in 1960.

== Character description ==
Quick Draw was usually depicted as a sheriff in a series of short films set in the Old West, often accompanied by his deputy, a Mexican burro called Baba Looey (also voiced by Daws Butler) who spoke with a Mexican accent and called his partner "Queeks Draw". In the Spanish American version, Quick Draw is named Tiro Loco McGraw, while Baba Looey is named Pepe Trueno. In the Brazilian version, Quick Draw speaks in a Portuguese accent, which along with his Hispanized name (Pepe Legal) would suggest he was either a Texan-American or Mexican cowboy.

His character was well-intentioned, but somewhat dim. His main catchphrases were "Now hold on there!" and "I'll do the thin'in' around here and don't you forget it!". Additionally, if he got hurt he would often say "Ooooh that smarts!". One of the main running gags in the shorts was him accidentally shooting himself with his own six-shooter.

Another featured character was Snuffles, the bloodhound dog that would point to his mouth and "ah-ah-ah-" when he wanted a biscuit, then hug himself, leap up in the air, and float back down after having eaten one. In A Pup Named Scooby-Doo, Scooby follows the same foil as Snuffles when he eats a Scooby snack.

== Personality ==
Quick Draw was himself a horse caricature that walked on two legs like a human (as did Baba Looey), and had "hands" that were hooves with thumbs and could hold objects such as guns. This enabled the show's producers to depict him riding into town on a realistic horse, and as seen in the show's opening credits, driving a stagecoach pulled by a whole team of realistic horses. This aspect was made light of in the 1980s made-for-television film The Good, the Bad, and Huckleberry Hound, which featured Quick Draw.

== El Kabong ==
El Kabong swinging to the rescue

In certain cases, Quick Draw would also assume the identity of the Spanish masked vigilante El Kabong (a spoof of Zorro). As El Kabong, Quick Draw would attack his foes by swooping down on a rope with the war cry "Olé!" and hitting them on the head with an acoustic guitar (after shouting "Kabooooong!"), which is always referred to as a "kabonger", producing a distinctive kabong sound and usually destroying the guitar in the process. The "guitar" was usually drawn as a four strung cuatro. On the cartoon's soundtrack, the "kabong" sound effect was produced by a Foley artist striking the detuned open strings of a cheap acoustic guitar.

== Guest appearances in other media ==
- Quick Draw McGraw occasionally appeared in other Hanna-Barbera productions, including 1973's Yogi's Gang, 1977–1978's Laff-A-Lympics, a celebrity roast honoring Fred Flintstone on the TV special Hanna-Barbera's All-Star Comedy Ice Revue (1978) and the 1979 TV special Casper's First Christmas, and in an episode from the short-lived 1978 series Yogi's Space Race.
- Quick Draw McGraw appears in Yogi Bear's All Star Comedy Christmas Caper, voiced again by Daws Butler.
- Quick Draw McGraw and Baba Looey appear in The Yogi Bear Show episode "Yogi's Birthday Party".
- Quick Draw McGraw appears in Yogi's Treasure Hunt.
- Quick Draw McGraw appears in the "Fender Bender 500" segment of Wake, Rattle, and Roll, voiced by Greg Burson, while Baba Looey is voiced by Neil Ross.
- Quick Draw McGraw and Baba Looey appear in the Yo Yogi! episode "Yippee Yo, Yogi!", voiced again by Greg Burson, while Baba Looey is voiced by Henry Polic II.
- Quick Draw McGraw makes a cameo appearance in the Samurai Jack episode "Couple on a Train", voiced again by Greg Burson.
- Quick Draw McGraw appears in the Robot Chicken episode "Ban of the Fun", in the skit "Laff-A-Munich", voiced by Seth Green.
- Quick Draw McGraw appears in The Simpsons episode "Million Dollar Abie".
- Quick Draw McGraw appears in the I Am Weasel episode "I Am My Lifetime".
- Quick Draw McGraw appears in the Class of 3000 episode "Home", voiced by Tom Kenny.
- Quick Draw McGraw and Baba Looey appear in the South Park episode "Imaginationland Episode III".
- Quick Draw McGraw appears in Harvey Birdman, Attorney at Law, voiced by Maurice LaMarche.
- Quick Draw McGraw appears in Exit, Stage Left!: The Snagglepuss Chronicles. In the same issue, he was also portrayed as the lover of Huckleberry Hound's father; Huckleberry Hound Jr. later works with Quick Draw and Snagglepuss as cartoon characters.
- Quick Draw McGraw appears in the Wacky Races episode "Much Ado About Wacky", voiced by Billy West.
- Quick Draw McGraw and Baba Looey make cameo appearances in the Animaniacs episode "Suffragette City".
- El Kabong appears in Jellystone!, voiced by Bernardo de Paula. This version is a Mexican superhero and teacher who is an enemy of The Banana Splits and wields a guitar named Susan (voiced by Melissa Villaseñor). He is never referred as Quick Draw in this series and is always dressed as his alter ego.
- Quick Draw McGraw appears in the Teen Titans Go! episode "Warner Bros. 100th Anniversary".

== In advertisements ==
- Quick Draw was the mascot for Sugar Smacks in the early 1960s.
- Quick Draw made a cameo in a MetLife commercial in 2012.

== Parodies ==
- There are references to "El Kabong" in the TV series The Critic – Jay Sherman's father, Franklin Sherman, imitates El Kabong, swooping from chandeliers dressed similar to Zorro and hitting people over the head with a guitar.
- In the professional wrestling world, the name "El Kabong" was used by then-Extreme Championship Wrestling commentator Joey Styles to describe when a popular ECW wrestler, New Jack, used an acoustic guitar as a weapon during a match. The act is also used by former World Wrestling Federation employee The Honky Tonk Man, former enhancement talent Quick Draw Rick McGraw, former Total Nonstop Action Wrestling Vice President and wrestler Jeff Jarrett, and current World Wrestling Entertainment wrestler Elias.
- Noted radio producer Gary Dell'Abate, who has worked for radio "shock jock" Howard Stern since the early 1980s, has been nicknamed "Baba Booey" for many years, after a mispronunciation of Quick Draw McGraw's sidekick, Baba Looey. "Baba Booey" became a catchphrase for Howard Stern fans for decades, usually shouted out in a large crowd.

== Merchandise ==
- McFarlane Toys produced a figure of Quick Draw McGraw as El Kabong as part of their Hanna-Barbera toy line.
- In 1991, Hi-Tec Software published a licensed Quick Draw McGraw video game.
- The series released on Blu-ray on October 20, 2026.

== References in popular music ==
Quick Draw McGraw is referred to in Busta Rhymes' songs "So Hardcore" and "Everything Remains Raw". He is also referred to in MF Doom's song "Modern Day Mugging". Lil Wayne refers to Quick Draw McGraw in his songs "Fireman" and "What's Wrong With Them?". Quick Draw McGraw is also referred to in House of Pain's song "Shamrocks and Shenanigans (Butch Vig Mix)". The Game's "One Blood (Remix)" refers to Quick Draw McGraw.

== Other references ==
In the English versions of the Nintendo DS, Android, and iOS versions of Dragon Quest IV, one of Tsarevna Alena's tournament opponents is named Quick Draw McGore.

== See also ==
- List of fictional horses
