= Snagglepuss =

Hanna-Barbera cartoon character

- The Quick Draw McGraw Show and The Yogi Bear Show character
- First appearance: “Lamb Chopped” (The Quick Draw McGraw Show, 1959)
- Created by: William Hanna; Joseph Barbera
- Voiced by: Daws Butler (1959–1988); Frank Milano (Songs of Yogi Bear and his Pals LP (1961)); Greg Burson (1989–2002); Billy West (commercials, Wacky Races); Earl Kress (Hanna-Barbera Cartoon Sound FX (1994)); Jeff Bergman (Cartoon Network commercials, 1999–present); Scott Innes (2003, 2012); Stephen Stanton (MetLife commercial); Victor Yerrid (Robot Chicken); Chris Edgerly (Drawn Together); Tom Kenny (Evil Con Carne, Wacky Races); Dana Snyder (Jellystone!)

In-universe information
- Alias: Snaggletooth
- Species: Mountain lion
- Gender: Male

Snagglepuss is a cartoon character who debuted in prototype form on The Quick Draw McGraw Show in 1959 and was established as a studio regular by 1961. A light pink anthropomorphic mountain lion sporting an upturned collar, shirt cuffs, and bow tie, Snagglepuss enjoys the finer things in life and shows a particular affinity for the theatre. His stories routinely break the fourth wall as the character addresses the audience in self-narration, soliloquy, and asides. Originally voiced by Daws Butler, Snagglepuss seeks quasi-Shakespearean turns of phrase. Some of his campy verbal mannerisms became catchphrases: "Heavens to Murgatroyd!", "Exit, stage right (or left)!", and using emphatic "even" at the end of sentences.

== History ==
A pink puma known as "Snaggletooth", featuring the eventual character's general manner and Bert Lahr-inspired voice but without collar or cuffs, first appeared on television in The Quick Draw McGraw Show in 1959. The character subsequently appeared in a supporting role in Augie Doggie and Doggie Daddy and Snooper and Blabber. Under the revised name of Snagglepuss, the character appeared in his own series of shorts in 1961 as a regular segment on The Yogi Bear Show, featuring in 32 episodes. He later appeared in other Hanna-Barbera shows, including Yogi's Gang (1973), as a co-host in Laff-A-Lympics (1977–78), Yogi's Treasure Hunt (1985), and as a teenager in Yo Yogi! (1991).

Snagglepuss's appearance in a 1960s run of Kellogg's cereal television commercials prompted legal action by actor Bert Lahr, who said the similarity of the character's voice to his own could lead viewers to the false conclusion that Lahr himself had endorsed the product. As part of the settlement, the disclaimer "Snagglepuss voice by Daws Butler" was required to appear on each commercial. This made Butler one of the few voice artists to receive screen credits in a TV commercial.

Butler reused the same Snagglepuss voice for two other Hanna-Barbera characters: Jonathan Wellington "Mudsy" Muddlemore in The Funky Phantom and Brutus the Lion in The Roman Holidays.

== Character description ==
Snagglepuss lives in a cavern, which he constantly tries to make more habitable for himself. No matter what he does, however, he always winds up back where he started or worse off than he was before. In some episodes, Snagglepuss is chased by Major Minor (voiced by Don Messick), a tiny-sized hunter. A few episodes involved him trying to court a mountain lioness named Lila (voiced by Jean Vander Pyl), but who always rejected his advances for being too boorish or pathetic.

Butler's voicing of the character recalls the work of actor Bert Lahr, especially the more mellow moods of Lahr's Cowardly Lion in the 1939 film The Wizard of Oz.

Snagglepuss has three signature catchphrases. His most famous is his perpetual exclamation "Heavens to Murgatroyd!" Before dashing offscreen to make an escape or run an errand, Snagglepuss announces the move in the form of a theatrical stage direction, saying "Exit, stage left/right/up/down!". Finally, Snagglepuss tends to add the word "even" for emphasis at the ends of sentences:

- After emphasizing a previous statement ("Somebody hurt! In dire pain, even!").
- After stating a synonymous phrase ("On account of I must be a little rusty. Stale, even").
- In a grammatically correct way, though out of order in the sentence ("I wonder if he knows my telephone number, even").
- Simply added as an exclamation ("Heavens to Murgatroyd! A veritabububble frankenmouse monster, even!").

The character's pink color, lilting voice, and theatrical manner led some viewers to interpret Snagglepuss as stereotypically gay. This implication was echoed over the years in many parodies, then seriously explored in the 2018 comic miniseries Exit, Stage Left!: The Snagglepuss Chronicles from DC Comics, part of their Hanna-Barbera Beyond initiative.

== List of episodes ==
Every episode was produced and directed by William Hanna and Joseph Barbera, and written by Michael Maltese.

No.	Title	Animation	Layout	Backgrounds	Original release date	Prod. code
1	"Major Operation"	Lew Marshall	Paul Sommer	Dick Thomas	1960	R-1
2	"Feud for Thought"	Brad Case	Paul Sommer	Dick Thomas	1960	R-3
3	"Live and Lion"	Lew Marshall	Tony Rivera	Art Lozzi	1960	R-9
4	"Fraidy Cat Lion"	Art Davis	Paul Sommer	Dick Thomas	1960	R-4
5	"Royal Ruckus"	Don Patterson	Paul Sommer	Dick Thomas	1961	R-10
6	"The Roaring Lion"	Lew Marshall	Tony Rivera	Bob Gentle	1961	R-24
7	"Paws for Applause"	Don Patterson	Lance Nolley	Art Lozzi	1961	R-23
8	"Knights and Daze"	LaVerne Harding	Tony Rivera	Bob Gentle	1961	R-34
9	"The Gangsters All Here"	Lew Marshall	Dick Bickenbach	Bob Gentle	1961	R-31
10	"Having a Bowl"	Art Davis	Walt Clinton	Dick Thomas	1961	R-30
11	"Diaper Desperado"	Bob Bentley	Jack Huber	Neenah Maxwell	1961	R-45
12	"Arrow Error"	Hicks Lokey	Walt Clinton	Art Lozzi	1961	R-37
13	"Twice Shy"	Phil Duncan	Jack Huber	Bob Gentle	1961	R-39
14	"Cloak and Stagger"	Hicks Lokey	Dan Noonan	Neenah Maxwell	1961	R-48
15	"Remember Your Lions"	Gil Turner	Tony Rivera	Fernando Montealegre	1961	R-42
16	"Remember the Daze"	Bill Keil	Walt Clinton	Dick Thomas	1961	R-57
17	"Express Trained Lion"	LaVerne Harding	Jack Huber	Neenah Maxwell	1961	R-54
18	"Jangled Jungle"	Don Patterson	Jack Huber	Fernando Montealegre	1961	R-51
19	"Lion Tracks"	Hicks Lokey	Tony Rivera	Bob Gentle	1961	R-63
20	"Fight Fright"	Bob Carr	Jack Huber	Art Lozzi	1961	R-66
21	"Lions Share Sheriff"	George Nicholas	Lance Nolley	Art Lozzi	1961	R-6
22	"Cagey Lion"	LaVerne Harding	Walt Clinton	Dick Thomas	1961	R-12
23	"Charge That Lion"	Art Davis	Tony Rivera	Vera Hanson	1961	R-17
24	"Be My Ghost"	C.L. Hartman	Walt Clinton	Neenah Maxwell	1961	R-27
25	"Spring Hits a Snag"	Ken Southworth	Tony Rivera	Dick Thomas	1961	R-69
26	"Legal Eagle Lion"	Jack Carr	Lance Nolley	Dick Thomas	1961	R-60
27	"Don't Know It Poet"	Allen Wilzbach	Don Sheppard	Bob Gentle	1961	R-75
28	"Tail Wag Snag"	Allen Wilzbach	Noel Tucker	Art Lozzi	1961	R-72
29	"Rent and Rave"	Jack Ozark	Tony Rivera	Neenah Maxwell	1961	R-78
30	"Footlight Fright"	Bob Bentley	Walt Clinton	Fernando Montealegre	1962	R-80
31	"One Two Many"	Don Towsley	Tony Rivera	Art Lozzi	1962	R-82
32	"Royal Rodent"	TBA	TBA	TBA	1962	R-76

== Other appearances ==
=== Hanna-Barbera ===
- Snagglepuss appeared in Yogi's Ark Lark (1972) and Yogi's Gang (1973). In Yogi's Gang, he is often referred to as a tiger and not a mountain lion.
- Snagglepuss acted as a co-host with Mildew Wolf from the Cattanooga Cats segment "It's the Wolf" on Scooby's All-Star Laff-A-Lympics and Scooby's All-Stars (1977–79).
- Snagglepuss made a special guest appearance at a celebrity roast honoring Fred Flintstone in the television special Hanna-Barbera's All-Star Comedy Ice Revue (1978).
- Snagglepuss also appeared in the animated holiday specials Casper's First Christmas (1979), Yogi's First Christmas (1980) and Yogi Bear's All Star Comedy Christmas Caper (1982).
- Snagglepuss was a regular in Yogi's Treasure Hunt.
- Snagglepuss appeared in four television films which were part of the Hanna-Barbera Superstars 10 series:
  - Yogi's Great Escape (1987)
  - Yogi Bear and the Magical Flight of the Spruce Goose (1987)
  - The Good, the Bad, and Huckleberry Hound (1988)
- Snagglepuss appeared in A Yabba Dabba Doo Celebration: 50 Years of Hanna-Barbera (1989).
- In the "Fender Bender 500" segment of Wake, Rattle, and Roll, Snagglepuss was paired up with Huckleberry Hound as they drove a monster truck called the Half-Dog, Half-Cat, Half-track; it resembled a portable stage, which was perfectly appropriate for both Huck and Snag.
- Snagglepuss was featured as a teenager in Yo Yogi!, again voiced by Greg Burson.
- Snagglepuss was seen in a Cartoon Network Rap in 1995.
- Snagglepuss made a non-speaking cameo in the Harvey Birdman, Attorney at Law episode "Peanut Puberty".
- Snagglepuss stars in an eight-page DC Comics' story within Suicide Squad/Banana Splits Annual #1 by writer Mark Russell and artist Mike Feehan. The eight-page story was then followed by a six-issue comic miniseries Exit, Stage Left!: The Snagglepuss Chronicles (also by Mark Russell) with the first issue released on January 3, 2018. The comic depicts Snagglepuss as a gay playwright living in 1950s New York City whose career features parallels to that of Tennessee Williams and is also given a male human lover named Pablo with whom he is in a closeted relationship. The comics also features Huckleberry Hound and Quick Draw McGraw as supporting characters who are also in a gay relationship that were initially supportive of Snagglepuss only for their own lives to fall to ruin due to a McCarthyist purge which ends up putting Huckleberry in jail. The comic later won a GLAAD Award for Outstanding Comic Book.
- Snagglepuss appears in the Wacky Races episode "Much Ado About Wacky".
- Snagglepuss appears in Jellystone!, voiced by Dana Snyder. He appears as one of the many residents in the cartoon town of Jellystone where he works for the entertainment industry. He is also gay, according to Melody Iza.
- As of 2022, a new Snagglepuss animated series was in development, to be voiced by Jim Parsons. There has been no new information since then.

=== Non-Hanna-Barbera ===
- In The Simpsons episode "Sweet Seymour Skinner's Baadasssss Song" (April 28, 1994), Miss Hoover reminds Ralph Wiggum that he once reported seeing Snagglepuss outside in the hallway. Ralph responds, "he was going to the bathroom". In the other episode "Lady Bouvier's Lover" (May 12, 1994), Comic Book Guy shows Bart a cel of Snagglepuss as an example of a cel that is actually worth something, as opposed to the cel of Scratchy's arm that Bart was trying to sell to him.
- Snagglepuss appeared in the Robot Chicken episode "Ban on the Fun", voiced by Victor Yerrid. In the "Laff-A-Munich" skit, he is seen on a television set, telling the audience about the disappearance of the Yogi Yahooeys.
- In the adult animated sitcom Drawn Together, Snagglepuss is featured in the episode "Gay Bash", but his face is blurred, referencing how strangers are blurred on reality programs. He was voiced by Chris Edgerly.
- Snagglepuss made a brief cameo in The Grim Adventures of Billy & Mandy episode "Irwin Gets a Clue", being hit by Hoss Delgado's truck.
- Snagglepuss made two cameos in a MetLife commercial in 2012, titled "Everyone". In a behind the scenes video, Snagglepuss (voiced by Stephen Stanton) acts and rehearses in front of the director of the ad, only for the director to tell him he does not have any speaking roles in the ad, and in response, Snagglepuss storms out of the trailer.
- On a Season 34: Episode 8 "Weekend Update" segment on Saturday Night Live (November 15, 2008), Bobby Moynihan appears in costume as Snagglepuss to comment on California's ban on same-sex marriage. During the segment, Snagglepuss is "outed" by anchor Seth Meyers and then confesses that his domestic partner is fellow Hanna-Barbera cartoon character The Great Gazoo, who also makes a cameo played by Will Forte.
- Snagglepuss made a cameo appearance in the Animaniacs revival segment "Suffragette City".
- Snagglepuss made several cameos in the Teen Titans Go! episode "Warner Bros. 100th Anniversary".
- Snagglepuss was indirectly referenced in the 2022 superhero video game, Gotham Knights.

== See also ==
- List of Hanna-Barbera characters
- List of works produced by Hanna-Barbera
- The Yogi Bear Show
