= Winsome Witch =

- Directed by: William Hanna; Joseph Barbera
- Voices of: Jean Vander Pyl
- Theme music composer: Hoyt Curtin
- Country of origin: United States
- Original language: English
- No. of seasons: 2
- No. of episodes: 26

Production
- Producers: William Hanna; Joseph Barbera
- Running time: 6 minutes
- Production company: Hanna-Barbera Productions

Original release
- Network: NBC
- Release: October 2, 1965 – September 7, 1967

Related
- The Atom Ant/Secret Squirrel Show

Winsome Witch is an American animated television series produced by Hanna-Barbera Productions which aired as a segment on The Atom Ant/Secret Squirrel Show from October 2, 1965 to September 7, 1967. The main character, Winsome "Winnie" W. Witch (the middle initial stands for Wacky), has various adventures and casts spells on people; her travels on her magical broom take her all over the world.

== Plot ==
Winnie (voiced by Jean Vander Pyl) is a friendly, yet somewhat inept witch, and a "fairy godmother drop-out". Her catch phrase when casting a spell is "Ippity-pippity-pow." When the magic spell is cast, the "Jet Screamer" entrance cue from The Jetsons is heard.

== Episodes ==
=== Season 1 (1965–66) ===
| No. overall | No. in season | Title | Original release date |
|---|---|---|---|
| 1 | 1 | "Have Broom Will Travel" | October 2, 1965 |
Winnie goes to the Acme Employment Agency to get a job. Mister Acme later calls to inform her that he has a babysitting job for her. However, the two little boys, Ringo and Clyde, are more trouble than Winnie had bargained for.
| 2 | 2 | "Prince of a Pup" | October 9, 1965 |
Winnie tries to help the Queen get rid of Snow White.
| 3 | 3 | "Operation Broom Switch" | October 16, 1965 |
Two spies switch Winnie's broom with a non-enchanted one, but their plans fail when they realize they do not have the secret word that makes "the broom zoom".
| 4 | 4 | "The Hansel and Gretel Case" | October 23, 1965 |
Two children show up at Winnie's house claiming to be Hansel and Gretel.
| 5 | 5 | "The Little Big League" | October 30, 1965 |
Winnie helps out a Little League team when one of their players is sick.
| 6 | 6 | "School Teacher Winnie" | November 6, 1965 |
Winnie takes on a job as a school teacher.
| 7 | 7 | "Good Red Riding Hood" | November 13, 1965 |
Winnie uses her magic to help Little Red Riding Hood evade the Big Bad Wolf.
| 8 | 8 | "Winnie's Baby" | November 20, 1965 |
Winnie discovers a baby on her doorstep. She adopts the child and names it Spooky.
| 9 | 9 | "How Now Cinderella" | November 27, 1965 |
Winnie tells some children how she met Cinderella on her way to the ball.
| 10 | 10 | "Have Broom Will Zoom" | December 4, 1965 |
Winnie hops on her broom to try to find a flying saucer. She gets zapped onto the saucer and meets some aliens, who take her to their home planet.
| 11 | 11 | "Winnie the Sheriff" | December 11, 1965 |
Winnie arrives in an all-male western town where all the men like her. But when the outlaw cowboys come, she is elected sheriff when she uses her powers to thwart the robber. After that, though she appreciates that the cowboys like her, she cannot stand so much attention. To remedy this, Winnie conjures up a stagecoach full of ladies to come live in the town and marry the men.
| 12 | 12 | "Welcome Wagging" | December 18, 1965 |
After many fruitless attempts of trying to find a puppy a home, Winnie adopts it.
| 13 | 13 | "Shoo Spy" | December 25, 1965 |
The Pentagon's chief of secret operations calls in Winnie to deal with enemy spy Dr. Zero. Surprisingly, her magic fails to thwart him, so she tries a different approach. When Dr. Zero said he turned to espionage because no woman wanted to date him, she tries to improve his appearance to gain the attention of the ladies and thus make him quit spying.
| 14 | 14 | "Wolfcraft Vs. Witchcraft" | January 1, 1966 |
After being stopped by Winnie, who is protecting the Three Little Pigs, the Big Bad Wolf tries to fight magic with magic.
| 15 | 15 | "Tallyho the Hunter" | January 8, 1966 |
Winnie transforms into different animals in order to stop a hunter.
| 16 | 16 | "Witch Hitch" | January 15, 1966 |
Winnie goes to Washington, D.C. after hearing that a flying saucer has landed on the White House's lawn.
| 17 | 17 | "Ugly Duckling Trouble" | January 22, 1966 |
Winnie tries to help an ugly duckling feel better about himself.
| 18 | 18 | "Witch Witch Is Witch" | January 29, 1966 |
Winnie babysits Ringo and Clyde again, but when she falls asleep, the boys play with her wand, turning the house into a castle and themselves into gorillas. When they forget the magic words and their parents are about to come back, Winnie's broom wakes her up and she fixes everything.
| 19 | 19 | "Good Little Scout" | February 5, 1966 |
Tom Thumb wants to be a Boy Scout, but is supposedly too small to join. Winnie helps him gain confidence.
| 20 | 20 | "Potluck" | February 12, 1966 |
Winnie attempts to help out the chef in Joe's Cafe, but things do not go quite as planned.

=== Season 2 (1966) ===
| No. overall | No. in season | Title | Original release date |
|---|---|---|---|
| 21 | 1 | "Pussycat Man" | September 10, 1966 |
In order to stop the two-headed villain called the Thinker who is committing a crime wave in Metropolis City, Winnie helps out her favorite superhero, Pussycat Man, after he is sidelined.
| 22 | 2 | "Sheriff Winnie" | September 17, 1966 |
In a thunderstorm, Winnie and her broom arrive in a western town. The Mayor appoints her sheriff and she has to capture a bad guy. After the bad guy fails (with Winnie using her magic to discourage him), the bad guy goes straight and wants to court Winnie.
| 23 | 3 | "Wee Winnie Witch" | September 24, 1966 |
Winnie's mischievous visiting niece bewitches everything she pleases and her aunt does her best to keep her and her magic in line. After a while, Wee Winnie goes too far, forcing Winnie to resort to witch-style corporal punishment.
| 24 | 4 | "Sea-Dogged" | October 1, 1966 |
Winnie gets shanghaied by a grumpy, bossy pirate captain who gets her to work as his scullery maid. Winnie decides to teach him some manners.
| 25 | 5 | "Wild Wild Witch" | October 8, 1966 |
In a parody of The Wizard of Oz, a tornado transports Winnie to a magical land where she ends up having to seek out the Wild Wizard.
| 26 | 6 | "Hollywood or Busted" | October 15, 1966 |
Winnie wins a trip to Hollywood after coming up with the winning slogan for a bar soap company. In Hollywood, she gets to be in a horror movie with Roger Glamoore (who is disguised as a monster). After shooting, a Hollywood tour bus passes by and Winnie notices the stewardess from the plane ride. She sets her up on a date with Roger (out of costume). As for Winnie, she ends up getting a date with Frankenstein.

== Voices ==
- Jean Vander Pyl - Winsome Witch

Other voices include Dick Beals, Mel Blanc, Henry Corden, Gerry Johnson, Allan Melvin, Don Messick, John Stephenson, and Janet Waldo.

== Home video ==
Worldvision Home Video released Winsome Witch on VHS tape in the 1980s. It featured eight episodes from the series. It was later re-released by GoodTimes Home Video (under the Kids Klassics label). Both releases have since gone out of print.

The episode "Prince of a Pup" is available on the DVD Saturday Morning Cartoons 1960's Vol. 1.

All the Winsome Witch episodes were included in The Secret Squirrel Show: The Complete Series, available on DVD and on iTunes.

== Other appearances ==
Winsome Witch appeared in the "Fender Bender 500" segment of Wake, Rattle, and Roll. She is shown to have a cat named Lucky (vocal effects provided by Don Messick) as her driving partner and she drives a cauldron-modeled monster truck called the Sonic Broom, which also has on it a talking skeleton named Axel (voiced by Neil Ross).

Winsome Witch appears in the Wacky Races episode "Little Pink Riding Hood", voiced by Nicole Parker.

Winsome Witch appears in Jellystone!, voiced by Lesley Nicol. She now has a British accent. Winsome Witch works in the cafeteria at Jellystone Hospital. In "Face of the Town", she partook in a race in Jellystone to determine who would become the new face of Jellystone. Like the "Fender Bender 500", she has Axel on her car. The episode "Spell Book" reveals that Winsome Witch is responsible for using her magic to decorate Jellystone on Halloween and is shown to live near a haunted house. Her role was reduced in the third season in where she was now a background character, though she does have a speaking appearance in the episode "Choir Choir, Pants on Fire".

From 1972-1991, a teacups ride called ‘Winnie Witch’s Cauldrons’ operated at Kings Island in Cincinnati, Ohio in the Happy Land of Hanna-Barbera section of the park. Winnie was also featured in The Enchanted Voyage ride at the park which operated from 1972-1983.
