= The Hillbilly Bears =

- Title card
- Genre: Comedy
- Directed by: William Hanna; Joseph Barbera
- Voices of: Henry Corden; Jean Vander Pyl; Don Messick; Paul Frees
- Theme music composer: Hoyt Curtin
- Country of origin: United States
- Original language: English
- No. of seasons: 2
- No. of episodes: 26

Production
- Producers: William Hanna; Joseph Barbera
- Running time: 6 minutes
- Production company: Hanna-Barbera Productions

Original release
- Network: NBC
- Release: October 2, 1965 – September 7, 1967

Related
- The Atom Ant/Secret Squirrel Show

The Hillbilly Bears is an American animated television series produced by Hanna-Barbera Productions, created by William Hanna and Joseph Barbera. The series aired as a segment on The Atom Ant/Secret Squirrel Show from October 2, 1965 to September 7, 1967.

== Overview ==
The Hillbilly Bears, played on a social stereotype of the "hillbilly", with a gun-toting, mumbling father Paw Rugg (voiced by Henry Corden) who was always "feudin'" (the "feudin'" was usually a lethargic operation, in which the protagonists fired the same bullet back and forth from the comfort of their rocking chairs) with their neighbors, the Hoppers.

Paw Rugg's voice was a low mumble, splattered with a few understandable words. Particularly in the first episodes, Paw Rugg's voice was incomprehensible; his speech improved with the later segments. His wife Maw (voiced by Jean Vander Pyl) was a homemaker who appeared as the more level-headed parent. Their daughter Floral (also voiced by Jean Vander Pyl) had lemon-colored fur (as opposed to the darker-colored fur of Maw, Paw and Shag); she was the Southern belle and most sophisticated member of the family. Shag (the youngest and smallest of the clan, voiced by Don Messick) was a troublemaker who looked up to his father. The voices and personas of Floral and Shag were nearly identical to Judy Jetson and Elroy from The Jetsons respectively.

== List of episodes ==
=== Season 1 (1965–66) ===
No. overall	No. in season	Title	Original release date
1	1	"Detour for Sure"	October 2, 1965
A construction crew is attempting to evict Maw and Paw Rugg out of their house so they can put in a new highway; however, the Ruggs are content to stay right where they are.
2	2	"Woodpecked"	October 9, 1965
A woodpecker is disturbing Maw's beauty rest; Paw and Shag try to get rid of it, but it outwits them at every turn.
3	3	"Anglers Aweigh"	October 16, 1965
Maw sends Paw to catch a catfish for their dinner and Paw gets more than he bargains for when he runs into Ol' Whiskers.
4	4	"Stranger Than Friction"	October 23, 1965
Disgusted with Paw's shooting strangers, Maw makes him swear to invite the next one to dinner: then along comes an escaped chimpanzee.
5	5	"Goldilocks and the Four Bears"	October 30, 1965
A movie star named Goldy Looks gets a flat tire and finds the Ruggs' house while looking for help; she ends up eating their food and sleeping in their beds. She runs off when the Ruggs get home with an idea for a movie.
6	6	"Going, Going Gone Gopher"	November 6, 1965
Paw is put in charge of guarding the garden when Maw goes to town, but he winds up having to defend it from a very hungry gopher.
7	7	"Courtin' Disaster"	November 13, 1965
A truce is called between the Ruggs and the Hoppers so that Floral and Claude can begin dating.
8	8	"Picnic Panicked"	November 20, 1965
At the annual Hog Waller picnic, Claude Hopper chases Floral, hoping to share her picnic basket, while Paw chases Claude.
9	9	"Judo Kudos"	November 27, 1965
Sumo, the Japanese fighting bear, is on his way to the circus when he falls out of the truck when it hits a bump; Sumo helps Paw learn karate so he can use it on his rival, Claude Hopper.
10	10	"Just Plane Around"	December 4, 1965
The experimental plane X-Ray-X lands near the Rugg house and Paw goes for an unexpected ride with Agent 00700 and his pal, who are trying to steal the plane.
11	11	"War Games"	December 11, 1965
The Pentagon decides to conduct war games in the Ruggs' backyard.
12	12	"Bricker Brats"	December 18, 1965
Shag and the Hopper boy keep getting into fights over who has the toughest dad, threatening to start the feud back up.
13	13	"Slap Happy Grandpappy"	December 25, 1965
Grandpa Rugg comes for a visit, much to the excitement of Floral and Shag; Grandpa wants to shoot some Hoppers, not knowing that Paw has just ended the feud with them.
14	14	"Pooped Pops"	January 1, 1966
It is July and time for Paw's yearly bath; when he is finished, Maw makes Paw play a Robin Hood game with Shag, even though he is very tired.
15	15	"Leaky Creek"	January 8, 1966
Maw sends Paw down to the creek to take a bath, even though he just took one last year and does not think he needs another one; but when he gets to the creek he finds it has gone dry due to a pesky beaver that has built a dam.
16	16	"My Fair Hillbilly"	January 15, 1966
Maw is tired of Paw being such a slob, so she sends him to the J.P. Snobbs School of Charm and they try to turn Paw into a gentleman.
17	17	"Rickety-Rockety-Raccoon"	January 22, 1966
Paw battles with Rickety Raccoon after he steals eggs from the Ruggs' hen house.
18	18	"Modern Inconvenience"	January 29, 1966
Maw and Paw are selected as the Hillbilly Family of the Month by Good Hillbillying Magazine and are given every modern convenience for one month.
19	19	"Rabbit Rumble"	February 5, 1966
Maw sends Paw and Shag to hunt for a rabbit for dinner.
20	20	"Speckled Heckler"	February 12, 1966
Professor Beetlebottom arrives at the Rugg house looking for a rare butterfly, the Speckled Fleeby Doo, and offers a $1,000 reward if the Ruggs capture one alive.

=== Season 2 (1966) ===
No. overall	No. in season	Title	Original release date
21	1	"Whirly Bear"	September 10, 1966
Paw goes on an unexpected ride while trying to fix the windmill.
22	2	"Saucy Saucers"	September 17, 1966
Paw is captured by aliens who take him back to their planet for observation.
23	3	"Chipper Chirper"	September 24, 1966
Paw is out hunting a meal for dinner when Maw's pet bird gets out of its cage and runs away.
24	4	"Gettin' Paw's Goat"	October 1, 1966
Paw battles with the neighbor's goat that is eating everything in the garden.
25	5	"Buzzin' Cuzzins"	October 8, 1966
Gorzo the Wild Man escapes from a truck delivering him to the circus and is mistaken for Paw's cousin Fud when he shows up at the cabin.
26	6	"Do the Bear"	October 15, 1966
Maw tries to wake up Paw from his between-naps rest period so he can go to the store for her; then music producers offer Paw a lifetime music contract after hearing him play the guitar in the store.

== Cast ==
- Henry Corden - Paw Rugg
- Jean Vander Pyl - Maw Rugg, Floral Rugg
- Don Messick - Shag Rugg
- Paul Frees - Claude Hopper

== Other appearances ==
The Rugg Family appeared in Yogi's Ark Lark and its spin-off series Yogi's Gang.

The Rugg Family all appeared in Jellystone! with Paw Rugg voiced by Jim Conroy, Ma Rugg voiced by Angelique Perrin, Floral Rugg voiced by Georgie Kidder, and Shag Rugg voiced by Ron Funches. The Rugg Family runs a cafe.

The Hillbilly Bears got their own section in the Kings Island attraction The Enchanted Voyage which operated from 1972-1983. Paw Rugg would also be referenced in the ride’s theme song ‘Cartoon Friends’.
