= Precious Pupp =

American animated television series

- Title card
- Directed by: William Hanna; Joseph Barbera
- Voices of: Don Messick; Janet Waldo
- Theme music composer: Hoyt Curtin
- Country of origin: United States
- Original language: English
- No. of seasons: 2
- No. of episodes: 26

Production
- Producers: William Hanna; Joseph Barbera
- Running time: 6 minutes
- Production company: Hanna-Barbera Productions

Original release
- Network: NBC
- Release: October 2, 1965 – September 7, 1967

Related
- The Atom Ant/Secret Squirrel Show

Precious Pupp is an American animated television series produced by Hanna-Barbera Productions that aired as a segment on The Atom Ant/Secret Squirrel Show from October 2, 1965, to September 7, 1967.

== Plot ==
Precious Pupp is a large mangy dog, voiced by Don Messick. His owner Granny Sweet, voiced by Janet Waldo, is a kindly old woman with a passion for motorcycles, completely oblivious to the fact that her beloved, affectionate pet was something of a neighborhood terror. He habitually slips behind a victim quietly — sometimes in defense of their home, sometimes just for the fun of it — and jolting him with a ferocious series of barks... but never where or when Granny could catch him in the act.

Unlike many cartoon animals, Precious did not speak. His usual vocalism was an asthmatic-sounding, "wheezing" laugh used even more famously by Muttley, a Hanna-Barbera character introduced three years later. Precious Pupp usually outsmarts his enemies, most notably Bruiser, the neighborhood bulldog. He also usually outsmarts his oblivious owner.

Twenty-six episodes were produced.

== List of episodes ==
=== Season 1 (1965–66) ===
| No. overall | No. in season | Title | Original release date |
|---|---|---|---|
| 1 | 1 | "Precious Jewels" | October 2, 1965 |
Precious Pupp makes a would-be jewel thief wish that he had stayed home.
| 2 | 2 | "Doggone Dognapper" | October 9, 1965 |
Precious gives a load of trouble to the local dog-catcher.
| 3 | 3 | "Bites and Gripes" | October 16, 1965 |
Precious is dognapped and held for ransom.
| 4 | 4 | "Queen of the Road" | October 23, 1965 |
| 5 | 5 | "Crook Out Cook Out" | October 30, 1965 |
Granny and Precious capture a thief while butterfly hunting.
| 6 | 6 | "Next of Kin" | November 6, 1965 |
| 7 | 7 | "Bowling Pinned" | November 13, 1965 |
Precious helps Granny become a bowling champion.
| 8 | 8 | "Poodle Pandemonium" | November 20, 1965 |
Precious falls in love with a pretty poodle.
| 9 | 9 | "Dog Tracks" | November 27, 1965 |
| 10 | 10 | "Sub-Marooned" | December 4, 1965 |
| 11 | 11 | "Lady Bugged" | December 11, 1965 |
| 12 | 12 | "Test in the West" | December 18, 1965 |
| 13 | 13 | "Bones and Groans" | December 25, 1965 |
Bruiser tries to steal a bone from Precious while Granny is away.
| 14 | 14 | "Butterfly Nut" | January 1, 1966 |
| 15 | 15 | "Precious Bone" | January 8, 1966 |
| 16 | 16 | "The Bird Watcher" | January 15, 1966 |
| 17 | 17 | "Dog Trained" | January 22, 1966 |
| 18 | 18 | "Oliver Twisted" | January 29, 1966 |
| 19 | 19 | "Pup, Skip and Jump" | February 5, 1966 |
| 20 | 20 | "A Grapple for the Teacher" | February 12, 1966 |

=== Season 2 (1966) ===
| No. overall | No. in season | Title | Original release date |
|---|---|---|---|
| 21 | 1 | "Pot Time Work" | September 10, 1966 |
| 22 | 2 | "A Fiend in Need" | September 17, 1966 |
| 23 | 3 | "Ski Sickness" | September 24, 1966 |
| 24 | 4 | "Mascot Massacre" | October 1, 1966 |
| 25 | 5 | "A.M. Mayhem" | October 8, 1966 |
| 26 | 6 | "Girl Whirl" | October 15, 1966 |

== Voices ==
- Don Messick - Precious Pupp, Bowling Champion, Officer Smith
- Janet Waldo - Granny Sweet
- Henry Corden - Burglar

== Home video ==
- Worldvision Home Video released Precious Pupp on VHS tape in the 1980s, which has long since been out of print.
- The episode "Precious Jewels" is available on the DVD Saturday Morning Cartoons 1960's Vol. 1.
- The episode "Bowling Pinned" is available on the DVD Saturday Morning Cartoons 1960's Vol. 2.

== Precious Pupp in other languages ==
- Brazilian Portuguese: O Xodó da Vovó
- Dutch: Precious Pup
- French: Charlemagne
- German: Poldi
- Hungarian: Cukorfalat
- Italian: Precious Pupp
- Japanese: Pappu-chan to Suīto Obasan
- Macedonian: Шеќерко
- Serbian: Kuče Dragoljupče
- Spanish: Lindo Pulgoso
- Turkish: Değerli

== Later appearances ==
- Granny Sweet later made an appearance in the Yo Yogi! episodes "Super Duper Snag" and "Bearly Working", voiced by Kath Soucie.
- Precious Pupp and Granny Sweet appeared in Jellystone! with Granny Sweet voiced by Grace Helbig.
