= List of Snorks episodes =

This is the list of episodes for Snorks, a Belgian-American animated series produced by Hanna-Barbera Productions with SEPP International S.A., and based on the original characters created by Nic Broca.

== Series overview ==
Season	Episodes	Originally released	
Season	Episodes	First released	Last released
Pilot		1982	
1	13	September 15, 1984	December 15, 1984
2	10	September 14, 1985	December 21, 1985
3	13	September 12, 1987	December 15, 1987
4	29	September 12, 1988	March 15, 1989

== Episodes ==
=== Pilot (1982) ===
There is an unaired pilot episode of Snorks for NBC in 1982, which was not really well-known due to its total non-transmission to the public. Clips from it can be seen in a promotional spot they had for the Saturday Morning kids' block with Alvin and the Chipmunks singing, plus clips from various shows, including Snorks itself. This pilot featured two unknown Snorks (most likely background characters) that did not apparently make it into the show.

Title	Original release date
"Pilot"	1982

=== Season 1 (1984) ===
Season 1 ran thirteen episodes from September 15 ("Journey to the Source") to December 15, 1984 ("Whales Tales"). Several title cards were lost in syndication for unknown reasons and a few episodes are paired with a few Season 2 episodes in reruns on Boomerang. Some episodes are also out of order on the DVD. The first season had an opening narration starting off with a sailor narrating about a mythical legend about mysterious underwater sea creatures rescuing Spanish Navy Captain Ortega whose log is housed in a library at a Caribbean monastery. It was used exclusively on NBC and worldwide broadcasters in 1984 and although it has never aired on American television ever since, it can be found on the DVD.

No. overall	No. in series	Title	Written by	Original release date
1a	1a	"Journey to the Source"	Sandy Fries	September 15, 1984
Before the annual Steam Festival kicks off, a shortage of steam occurs. Allstar and his gang go off to find the steam source and receive a 5,000 pearl reward.
1b	1b	"Vandal Scandal"	Gordon Bressack	September 15, 1984
Tooter is falsely accused by Junior for drawing on Governor Wetworth's statue, so the Snorks try to bring him home after he swims away and they also find the real culprit.
2a	2a	"Hooked on a Feeling"	Gordon Bressack	September 22, 1984
Occy falls for a female octopus, who is actually a fishing lure from "beyond the limits", and this causes havoc throughout Snorkland. Note: This rerun was aired with "Journey to the Source" on Boomerang, as the first segment episode.
2b	2b	"The New Neighbors"	Frances Novier	September 22, 1984
Tooter meets a hummerfish who follows him home, but the hummerfish are set to be killed, so the Snorks do their best to protect the species.
3a	3a	"Das Boot"	Charles M. Howell, IV	September 29, 1984
Tooter finds a human's boot and the Snorks believe it to be an alien spaceship, Junior and his dad especially, but the Snorks get a big surprise near the end.
3b	3b	"Which Snork Snitched?"	Gordon Bressack	September 29, 1984
After Allstar gets Junior in trouble for cheating at gymnastics, Junior spies on Dr. Galeo's plans and reveals them to his dad.
4a	4a	"Allstar's Allstar Band"	John Bonaccorsi	October 6, 1984
Allstar forms a band and holds a concert to help raise money for Dr. Galeo and Occy becomes the star of the show. Meanwhile, Junior tries to sabotage them so that his dad's band can get on stage.
4b	4b	"Snorkymania"	John Semper and Cynthia Friedlob	October 6, 1984
When red goo drops down into the ocean from dry space, Snorks who are hit by it start laughing uncontrollably, thus being called "snorkymania".
5a	5a	"A Snorking We Will Go"	Gordon Bressack	October 13, 1984
The Snorks go on a camping trip to earn merit badges, but Junior's use of modern convinences get in the way. Plus, they have an adventure along the way.
5b	5b	"Now You Seahorse, Now You Don't"	John Semper and Cynthia Friedlob	October 13, 1984
Junior cheats Allstar by winning a seahorse race and Allstar and Casey must find what has been making Junior's horse faster than Allstar's horse, Seabiscuit.
6a	6a	"Snorkdance"	Mark Seidenberg and Charles M. Howell, IV	October 20, 1984
It is Prom Night and most of the Snorks are going, but Allstar breaks his ankle during a snorker game, so he has Tooter go with Casey. Junior disguises himself as Tooter so he can go to the Prom.
6b	6b	"Snork Marks the Spot"	Gordon Bressack	October 20, 1984
Allstar and his friends find a treasure map and decide to go hunting for treasure. Junior then steals it for his own nefarious purposes.
7a	7a	"Junior's Secret"	Alan Burnett	October 27, 1984
Willie accidentally donates Junior's stuffed turtle to the local toy charity and Junior goes frantic trying to get it back, as he cannot sleep without it. Note: This rerun was aired with "The Blue Coral Necklace" on Boomerang, as the first segment episode.
7b	7b	"The Big Scoop"	Alan Burnett	October 27, 1984
Junior wants to show off to the high school newspaper by making a "scoop of the century" article about a giant wolffish, but all does not go as planned in his case.
8a	8a	"The Blue Coral Necklace"	Ray Parker	November 3, 1984
When Occy accidentally breaks Allstar's mom's blue coral necklace Allstar intended on giving it to Casey, the Snorks go to the blue coal mines to get more blue coral to make another one.
8b	8b	"Up, Up & Awave"	Tom Ruegger	November 3, 1984
COWS - the Committee Of Women Snorks - hold the annual Snorkland balloon race and Junior does all he can to win, even if it is cheating.
9a	9a	"Snorkin' Surf Party"	Gordon Bressack	November 10, 1984
Allstar shows off his skateboarding skills, which ticks off Junior, so they challenge each other to a surfing contest.
9b	9b	"The Snorkness Monster"	John Semper and Cynthia Friedlob	November 10, 1984
Casey discovers the fabled Snorkness Monster, but Junior finds its egg and tries getting money for it, assuming that it is a pearl.
10a	10a	"A Snork on the Wild Side"	Charles M. Howell, IV	November 17, 1984
The Snorks meet Jo-Jo, a Snork who comes from the wild. He frees some of the local zoo animals, which results in him getting put in jail by Governor Wetworth. Note: First appearance of Jo-Jo in this episode.
10b	10b	"Allstar's Double Trouble"	Ray Parker	November 17, 1984
When Samantha Waters comes to town, Allstar is so entranced by her that he accidentally schedules two dates for the same night - one with her and another with Casey.
11a	11a	"Fine Fettered Friends"	Gordon Bressack	December 1, 1984
Allstar and Junior get chained by magic handcuffs and they have to figure out ways to break free while also learning a lesson along the way.
11b	11b	"Time Out for Sissies"	Frances Novier	December 1, 1984
After slipping up in a game of snorkball, Dimmy decides to take ballet classes with Daffney to enhance his skills. He tries to keep it a secret until a gang spies him through the window and harasses him for it. They also harass Junior for money.
12a	12a	"Me Jo-Jo, You Daffney"	Charles M. Howell, IV and Alan Burnett	December 8, 1984
After realizing that Dimmy does not appreciate her, Daffney decides to take Jo-Jo to the annual Debutante Ball.
12b	12b	"The Old Shell Game"	Sharon Painter and John Bradford	December 8, 1984
Allstar, Dimmy and Tooter house sit and watch a shell collection for Mrs. Buckfish. Junior steals it to play a prank on the boys and it turns out both bad and good.
13a	13a	"The King of Kelp"	Charles M. Howell, IV and Alan Burnett	December 15, 1984
Junior and Allstar compete in the Kelp Festival for the title of "King of Kelp", but Junior destroys Allstar's machine so he can win.
13b	13b	"Whales Tales"	Tom Ruegger	December 15, 1984
The Snorks find a baby whale and try to bring it back to its mother.

=== Season 2 (1985) ===
Season 2 of Snorks aired from September 14 ("Snorkitis Is Nothing to Sneeze At") to December 21, 1985 ("The Backwards Snork") on NBC. Several changes were made during this season aside from animation style - Allstar's voice lowered while Casey's voice raised. The "We're the Snorks" main title theme is used. The Season 2 theme can be seen on YouTube, as well as Snorks home videos distributed by Worldvision in the 1980s and the season two DVD distributed by Warner Archive. This is also the shortest season of Snorks, with only 10 episodes.

No. overall	No. in series	Title	Written by	Original release date
14a	1a	"Snorkitis Is Nothing to Sneeze At"	Gordon Bressack	September 14, 1985
A snorkitis epidemic is taking place and Dr. Galeo tries to find a cure, but he gets sick with the illness, so it is up to Allstar and Casey to find a cure for snorkitis.
14b	1b	"The Whole Toot and Nothing but..."	Glenn Leopold	September 14, 1985
Tooter failed Speech three times and now has to be "left back". The Shelbys try to get him fixed, but soon learn that there is more to Tooter than they had thought before.
15a	2a	"Chickens of the Sea"	Lane Raichert	September 21, 1985
A shortage of salt leads Allstar to find the salt mines to get some for the Snorklanders, while Junior wants to use the salt to make some cash.
15b	2b	"Never Cry Wolf-Fish"	Betty G. Birney	September 21, 1985
Dimmy, Casey and Allstar go to observe some flying fish. The view is much closer for Dimmy, as he is taken by a hawkfish and stays in a nest with her babies.
16a	3a	"Learn to Love Your Snork"	Misty Stewart	September 28, 1985
Casey begins to have self-conscious issues regarding the size of her snork, so she buys a product she believe will shrink her snork (which ultimately fails). She learns the hard way that she looks great the way she is.
16b	3b	"Dr. Strangesnork"	Glenn Leopold, John Semper, and Cynthia Friedlob	September 28, 1985
Dr. Strangesnork - Dr. Galeo's evil brother - steals Allstar's invention at the local science fair and he wants to use it for his evil deeds.
17a	4a	"Allstar's Freshwater Adventure"	Glenn Leopold	October 5, 1985
Allstar gets sucked into Haley's Current and ends up meeting freshwater Snorks, who live in a river. Allstar also teaches them how to throw UFOs (unidentified falling objects) back into dry air.
17b	4b	"A Hard Day's Snork"	Gordon Bressack	October 5, 1985
Tooter becomes famous and performs at his own concert, but a piper fish hums a tune that takes the Snorks away, literally.
18a	5a	"It's Just a Matter of Slime"	Chris Otsuki and Glenn Leopold	October 12, 1985
Allstar meets the Kelp-Helpers, but Junior drives them out of town with his snide comments. Because of this, kelp floods Snorkland and causes a mess.
18b	5b	"Water Friends For?"	Kevin Hopps	October 12, 1985
Casey and Daffney get into a fight over going to a hockey game versus a rodeo and they do not talk to each other for a day. They soon realize the importance of their friendship.
19a	6a	"Junior's Octopuppy"	Lane Raichert and Mark Young	October 19, 1985
Allstar tells his Uncle Galeo the story of how Occy was once owned by Junior and the events that led to him being adopted by Allstar.
19b	6b	"The Shape of Snorks to Come"	Lane Raichert and Mark Young	October 19, 1985
A seaquake causes Junior to go into an alternative future, where he is the governor of Snorkland and stays true to his "No List". Later, he learns that if he wants to be governor someday, he must treat his future voters better.
20a	7a	"Casey and the Doubleheader"	Glenn Leopold	October 26, 1985
Casey meets a compel duplex named Red and Ed, but Red is not entirely who she thinks he is when he destroys her mom's sea rose garden and Dr. Galeo's lab. Note: Followed by a repeat of "Das Boot", as the first segment episode, on NBC and Boomerang airings.
20b	7b	"The Ugly Yuckfish"	Gordon Bressack	November 2, 1985
A yuckfish named Yucky forms a crush on Daffney and follows her home, and in a way he annoys her until she learns to accept who he is. Note: Followed by a repeat of "Vandal Scandal", as the first segment episode, on NBC and Boomerang airings.
21a	8a	"Gills Just Want to Have Fun"	Lane Raichert and Mark Young	November 9, 1985
Daffney's favorite icon, Jane Founder, comes to town and so she does everything to look just like her. Meanwhile, Dr. Strangesnork tries stealing the red beam he wants to use to take over town, but it is in Daffney's hair. Note: Followed by a repeat of "Up, Up & Awave" on NBC airings.
21b	8b	"Guess What's Coming to Dinner!"	Lane Raichert and Charles M. Howell, IV	November 23, 1985
A young Snorkeater happens to be a vegetarian, so the Snorks help him pretend that he eats Snorks. Meanwhile, Junior catches them in the act and believes that they are out to destroy the town. Note: Followed by a repeat of "A Snorking We Will Go" on NBC airings.
22a	9a	"A Sign of the Tides"	Charles M. Howell, IV	December 7, 1985
King Neptune loses his conch that lowers and raises the tides and this causes problems under the sea. Allstar and Dr. Galeo now have to find the conch before the ocean dries out. Note: Followed by a repeat of "Allstar's Allstar Band" on NBC airings.
22b	9b	"The Littlest Mermaid"	Glenn Leopold	November 16, 1985
Dimmy and Casey rescue a small mermaid named Serena from large winds, but Dr. Strangesnork wants to take advantage of her and her small size. Note: Followed by a repeat of "Which Snork Snitched?" on NBC airings.
23a	10a	"I Squid You Not"	Glenn Leopold	December 14, 1985
Allstar gets mad at Occy for accidentally breaking his science fair project, so the octopus runs away to the salt mines, where he befriends a squid. Note: Followed by a repeat of "The Big Scoop" on NBC airings.
23b	10b	"The Backwards Snork"	Charles M. Howell, IV	December 21, 1985
Allstar, Casey and Tooter meet Ebb, a Snork who can see backwards, and Governor Wetworth's about to turn his cave into a series of clamdominiums. Note: This episode marks Dimmy's final appearance in the series. Followed by a repeat of "The New Neighbors" on NBC airings.

=== Season 3 (1987) ===
Season 3 of Snorks aired from September 12 ("All's Whale That Ends Whale") to December 5, 1987 ("The Snorkshire Spooking") on the syndicated The Funtastic World of Hanna-Barbera. Many changes were made this season and progressed well into Season 4. Dimmy disappeared for unknown reasons, but he made cameo appearances in several episodes. Corky was introduced as a main character and Jo-Jo also became a main character. Several new villains were introduced, such as the Great Snork Nork, Bigweed and Lil' Seaweed, the latter two going on to replace Junior as the main villain(s). This was the only season of Snorks to use digital ink and paint animation. The widely known theme song "Come Along With the Snorks" was used and has been for many years. Several casting changes were made - Alan Oppenheimer replaced Frank Nelson as the voice of Governor Wetworth following his death and also replaced Bob Holt as the voice of Mr. Seaworthy, who also died. Lane Raichert also became head writer.

No. overall	No. in series	Title	Written by	Original release date
24a	1a	"All's Whale That Ends Whale"	Story by : Joseph Barbera and Lane Raichert; Teleplay by : David Schwartz	September 12, 1987
While on a field trip, Allstar and his friends get swallowed by a whale and must work together in order to get out. Note: This is the first episode to use the digital ink and paint animation.
24b	1b	"Allstar's Last Hour"	Story by : Lane Raichert; Teleplay by : John Bates	September 12, 1987
Allstar catches bluemonia and the Snorks go off to find a cure, marking the first time that they ever meet Bigweed and Lil' Seaweed.
25a	2a	"A Willie Scary Shalloween"	Evelyn A-R Gabai	September 19, 1987
To prove that he can be scary enough for Shalloween, Willie decides to go after Shellshock, the most feared monster in the sea.
25b	2b	"Sea Shore Sideshow"	Story by : Joseph Barbera and Lane Raichert; Teleplay by : Alan Swayze	September 19, 1987
Allstar, Casey and Tooter get caught in dry space by a strange man and he uses them as a sideshow act, but Casey and Tooter seem to enjoy it.
26a	3a	"Freeze Save Our Town"	Story by : Lane Raichert; Teleplay by : David Schwartz	September 26, 1987
Esky's hometown is being invaded by Snork-Eaters, so the Snorks do what they can to stop them. Note: First appearance of Esky and the Snork Pole in this episode.
26b	3b	"SNIP & SNAP"	Evelyn A-R Gabai	September 26, 1987
Bigweed and Lil' Seaweed invented SNIP and SNAP, but they turn out to be good and pose a threat to Corky, as they might become Snorkland's new heroes.
27a	4a	"Junior's Empire"	Mary Jo Ludin	October 3, 1987
Casey is running for class president, but Junior bribes everyone with food so that he can win and take over like Julius Seastar. Note: Dimmy's first cameo appearance since his sudden disappearance from the series is in this episode near the end.
27b	4b	"The Golden Dolphin"	Story by : Evelyn A-R Gabai and Lane Raichert; Teleplay by : John Bates	October 3, 1987
Corky and Jo-Jo, plus Allstar and Casey, follow a golden dolphin and try to return it to its family.
28a	5a	"It's Always Darkest Before the Snork"	Bernard Wolf	October 10, 1987
Snorkland is experiencing total darkness and they find that the cause is due to lack of a special light source - a Mor-Glow. Note: First appearance of the Great Snork Nork in the series.
28b	5b	"The Sand Witch"	Story by : Candace Howerton and Neal Barbera; Teleplay by : David Schwartz and Lane Raichert	October 10, 1987
The magic portal has opened up and Bigweed and Corky get sucked in. They meet a Seastar and a Sand Witch who are trying to get out.
29a	6a	"Tooter Loves Tadah"	Story by : Neal Barbera; Teleplay by : Evelyn A-R Gabai	October 17, 1987
Tooter falls for the new tooting Snork named Tadah, but she is being controlled by a large Snork named Toobah, so both of them compete for her affection before the big school dance.
29b	6b	"The Shady Shadow"	George Atkins	October 17, 1987
Dr. Strangesnork creates an evil contraption that makes evil shadows out of Snorks, but it ends up hitting Willie, leading everyone to believe that he has been doing "bad" things.
30a	7a	"Daffney's Ransom"	Story by : Lane Raichert; Teleplay by : John Bates	October 24, 1987
Daffney gets kidnapped by Bigweed and Lil' Seaweed while shopping and Bigweed wants a reward for finding her. In the meantime, Daffney gives Lil' Seaweed a makeover.
30b	7b	"Salmon Chanted Evening"	Story by : Joseph Barbera and Lane Raichert; Teleplay by : John Semper	October 24, 1987
Junior finds a treasure map and he invites his fellow Snorks on a treasure hunt with him in dry space, where they help a salmon named Wilber save his family from getting eaten by a bear.
31a	8a	"Casey in Sandland"	Story by : Neal Barbera; Teleplay by : Candace Howerton	October 31, 1987
Casey meets Sandy, her double - the Princess of the Sand People - and the two decide to trade lives, but all does not go well.
31b	8b	"Reefberry Madness"	Story by : Laren Bright and Lane Raichert; Teleplay by : Laren Bright	October 31, 1987
Bigweed and Lil' Seaweed put silly powder all over the newly grown reefberries, turning them red and causing any Snork who eats them to act silly.
32a	9a	"A Farewell of Arms"	Story by : Neal Barbera and Alan Swayze; Teleplay by : Alan Swayze	November 7, 1987
While racing seahorses inside an empty stadium, the Snorks meet a talking octopus named Quarterpus. They are so fascinated by his many tricks that Occy feels neglected because they keep paying attention to him.
32b	9b	"Mummy Snorkest"	Bernard Wolf	November 7, 1987
The Snorks are sent to the pyramids to find King Tut-Snork's mummy and bring it back to the Snorkland Museum, but their little adventure soon becomes chaotic for them. Note: Final appearance of the Great Snork Nork in the series.
33a	10a	"Jo-Jo in Control"	Story by : John Bradford and Lane Raichert; Teleplay by : John Bates	November 14, 1987
When Jo-Jo has had enough of everyone praising him for his masculinity and heroism, he does everything in his grasp to prove that he can be an ordinary Snork as well.
33b	10b	"The Day the Ocean Stood Still"	Story by : Neal Barbera and Lane Raichert; Teleplay by : Mary Jo Ludin	November 14, 1987
A UFO and aliens form the planet Seaturn come to visit Snorkland, but everything is not what it seems to be.
34a	11a	"Chills, Drills and Spills"	Story by : Evelyn A-R Gabai and Lane Raichert; Teleplay by : David Schwartz	November 21, 1987
While visiting Esky at the Snork Pole, Casey, Daffney, Tooter and Jo-Jo learn about oil drilling in the area, so they do their best to stop it before things get worse. Note: This episode marks the final appearance of Esky and the Snork Pole in the series.
34b	11b	"The Longest Shortcut"	Lane Raichert	November 21, 1987
Allstar and the gang are lost in a cavern and are trying to find their own ways out while fighting different obstacles.
35a	12a	"Willie and Smallstar's Big Adventure"	Story by : Laren Bright and Lane Raichert; Teleplay by : Laren Bright	November 28, 1987
When Willie and Smallstar are not allowed to go camping with the other Snorks, they decide to have their own camping trip.
35b	12b	"Taming of the Snork"	Evelyn A-R Gabai	November 28, 1987
Sultan Shoresheet's daughter Sharif is causing chaos in his kingdom, so he has his friend Dr. Galeo hire Allstar, Casey, Tooter and Junior to help "tame her". Junior however happens to be the one who tames her the most in the end.
36a	13a	"A Snork in a Gilded Cage"	Charles M. Howell, IV	December 5, 1987
While Allstar, Casey and their friends are collecting creatures to bring back to Snorkland, Allstar gets captured by a baby monster and temporarily become her "dolly".
36b	13b	"The Snorkshire Spooking"	Evelyn A-R Gabai	December 5, 1987
Governor Wetworth wants to sell the Snorkshire estate, but he is haunted by the Snorkshire family ghosts, as someone is after their treasure. Corky, along with the Snorks, comes to help and resolves the ghost problem. Note 1: This is the last episode to use the digital ink and paint animation. Scooby-Doo references are included in this episode. Note 2: This rerun was aired with "The Longest Shortcut" on Boomerang, as the first segment episode.

=== Season 4 (1988–1989) ===
Season 4, the final season of Snorks, aired in weekday syndication. It aired from September 12 ("Daffney's Not So Great Escape") to March 15, 1989 ("My Dinner with Allstar"). Dimmy made more cameo appearances throughout, and Bigweed and Lil' Seaweed had bigger roles as villains. Every episode following "In Junior's Image" was a two-parter. The digital ink and paint animation style was abandoned and replaced with older styles. The two differences of the fourth season's animation were that the movements of the Snorks themselves were different, and the quality overall was lighter than in the first and second seasons. It is also the longest season on the series, with a total of 36 episodes. The theme song "Come Along with the Snorks" was kept intact.

No. overall	No. in series	Title	Written by	Original release date	Prod. code
37a	1a	"Daffney's Not So Great Escape"	Story by : Lane Raichert; Teleplay by : John Bates	September 12, 1988	401
Daffney is excluded from doing important activities, but proves she can be just like the rest, even when Allstar, Casey and Corky are captured and held hostage in dry space.
37b	1b	"Willie's Best Fiend"	Lane Raichert	September 12, 1988	402
Junior is supposed to babysit Willie, who is off befriending a small Snork Eater and nobody approves of their friendship.
38a	2a	"Day of the Juniors"	Story by : Lane Raichert; Teleplay by : Mary Jo Ludin	September 14, 1988	403
Junior wants to earn extra cash, but he has so many chores to do, so he buys a contraption that creates multiple versions of him.
38b	2b	"Dr. Strangesnork's Bomb"	Laren Bright	September 14, 1988	404
Dr. Strangesnork has created a stink bomb (known as the Skunkfish) to destroy the town and the Snorks try to find it before it is too late.
39a	3a	"A Starfish Is Born"	Story by : Ernie Contreras; Teleplay by : Mary Jo Ludin	September 16, 1988	405
While stargazing, Casey, Allstar and Daffney spot a starfish named Neb, who has fallen out of the sky. They try their best to get him back to his family, but end up failing in the process.
39b	3b	"Ooze Got the Snorks"	Story by : Lane Raichert; Teleplay by : David Schwartz	September 16, 1988	406
The Snorks try to stop an evil giant green jellyfish named Ooze from taking over the town, and the culprits behind it all are none other than Bigweed and Lil' Seaweed.
40a	4a	"The Silly Snorkasaurus"	Lisa Maliani	September 19, 1988	407
Allstar finds Snorky as an egg in the forgotten sea. A rare Snorkasaurus egg hatches, but it keeps eating all the food. Meanwhile, Dr. Strangesnork wants to use it for his own evil deeds.
40b	4b	"Who's Who?"	David Schwartz	September 19, 1988	408
Dr. Galeo's latest invention gets tested, but it ends up switching the brains of Allstar and Spike the Snork-Eater, who is attempting to eat the entire town.
41a	5a	"Battle of the Gadgets"	Story by : Lane Raichert; Teleplay by : Alan Swayze	September 21, 1988	409
Junior loses to Allstar at an awards ceremony and sells his gadgets to an old lady, not knowing that it is Lil' Seaweed, who has bought them so that she and Bigweed can use them to take over Snorkland.
41b	5b	"Little Lord Occy"	Jim Pfanner	September 21, 1988	410
Occy is discovered to be the long-lost pet of the Snorkhamptoms, so Occy goes to their mansion where he will be trained to act sophisticated and proper.
42a	6a	"Junior's Fuelish Kelp Rush"	M.R. Wells	September 23, 1988	411
Junior finds the rare kelp ruby plant and he sells it as fuel in order to make quick money.
42b	6b	"The Boo Lagoon"	Story by : Lane Raichert and Laren Bright; Teleplay by : Kristina Mazzotti	September 23, 1988	412
When trying to find a trapped Smallstar inside Corky's sub, they end up in a place called the "Boo Lagoon". They meet a ghost named Percy and they help him get his true love Penelope back from the evil pirate Captain Dweeb.
43a	7a	"How the Snork Was Won"	Candace Howerton	September 26, 1988	413
Chief Featherfin comes to visit and he and Governor Wetworth tell the story of how Snorkland was founded.
43b	7b	"In Junior's Image"	Evelyn A-R Gabai	September 26, 1988	414
When Junior causes trouble, Galeo invents a machine that pulls reflections out of mirrors. Ditto, a reflection of Junior, is created, but this causes even more trouble. Note: This is the last episode of the entire series to be 11 minutes.
44	8	"Robosnork"	Laren Bright	September 28, 1988	415
Corky is tired from doing so much work, so he creates a robotic double to help him out, but it ends up taking over the Snork Patrol. Note: Beginning with this episode, all of the episodes of the entire series are now 22 minutes.
45	9	"Summer & Snork"	Jim Pfanner	September 30, 1988	416
A famous actress named Tallulah Bankfish stars in a local play, but things get crazy. Junior wants to get rid of Allstar as the lead role and Bigweed and Lil' Seaweed plan on kidnapping the main actress.
46	10	"Allstar's Odyssey"	Eleanor Burian-Mohr and Jack Hanrahan	October 4, 1988	417
Allstar finds a golden fleece which leads to a quest filled with adventure and treasure.
47	11	"In Greed We Trust"	Story by : Lane Raichert; Teleplay by : Alan Swayze	October 6, 1988	418
Junior and Bigweed get sucked underground and work for Greedypus, a greedy octopus, where they learn the true meaning of greediness.
48	12	"Jaws Say the Word"	Lane Raichert	October 11, 1988	419
Allstar saves a kind and friendly shark named Joey, who follows him around, leading others to believe that Allstar is not brave.
49	13	"Prehisnorkic"	Laren Bright	October 13, 1988	420
Dr. Galeo, Daffney and Jo-Jo discover a frozen cavesnork from dry space, so they thaw him out and then use the time machine to return him to his time.
50	14	"Rhyme and Punishment"	M.R. Wells	October 19, 1988	421
While Daffney and Junior are trying to do a book report for class, they discover a magical fairy-tale themed book. Daffney and Pearlene, the princess, trade lives while Junior shows the princess around town, but it is later revealed that he is only after her wand.
51	15	"Big City Snorks"	Story by : Lane Raichert; Teleplay by : David Schwartz	December 12, 1988	423
The Snorks get lost in a huge city, where they not only search for an isolated Daffney, but help a boy retrieve his park from a nasty villain's grip.
52	16	"Snorkerella"	Lisa Maliani	December 14, 1988	426
Casey goes through a lot of trouble to get a date to the Homecoming Dance with Stevie, a popular football player. Meanwhile, Junior and Allstar compete for a date with Celia, a popular cheerleader.
53	17	"The Wizard of Ice"	Story by : Chuck Couch and Lane Raichert; Teleplay by : Mary Jo Ludin	December 16, 1988	422
The Snorks meet a fire flame named Ember in dry space and they help her stop the Ice Wizard form freezing the nearby land Snorks.
54	18	"Snork Ahoy"	Jim Pfanner	December 21, 1988	427
Casey and Allstar meet Captain Long John Wetworth and go on a pirate adventure, but this leads them to trouble when Bigweed and Lil' Seaweed join along.
55	19	"Nightmare on Snorkstreet"	Eleanor Burian-Mohr and Jack Hanrahan	January 4, 1989	424
Allstar and his friends play monster after getting the latest issue of Sea Science Annual, but the monsters showed up that they portray turn out to be very real.
56	20	"The Daring Young Snork on the Flying Trapeze"	Candace Howerton	January 10, 1989	428
Daffney joins the circus to prove to Junior that she is not scared, but someone else joins her, too.
57	21	"The Story Circle"	Story by : Kristina Mazzotti and Lane Raichert; Teleplay by : Kristina Mazzotti	January 12, 1989	430
When the power goes out, Grandpa has the Snorks gather around and create a story (similar to a "round robin") based on a classic fairy tale.
58	22	"Robin Snork"	Candace Howerton	January 25, 1989	425
Items have been mysteriously disappearing from Casey's dad's grocery store, so it is up to the gang to stop the thief. After they find out that it was Jo-Jo, they then learn that he had been giving all of the food to the poor salt mine workers who have been taken over by Bigweed and Lil' Seaweed.
59	23	"Oh Brother!"	Glenn Leopold	February 1, 1989	429
Dr. Galeo and Dr. Strangesnork go back in time with the time machine, where they relive the real reason why they hate each other (and why Dr. Strangesnork became evil). Note: This episode marks the final appearances of Dr. Galeo and Dr. Strangesnork.
60	24	"The Day They Fixed Junior Wetworth"	Lane Raichert and Laren Bright	February 8, 1989	432
It is Casey's birthday and Junior acts like a jerk yet again. Allstar tells the story of how Junior became this way and they hire Casey's uncle to "fix" him. Note: This episode marks the final spoken appearances of Junior, Daffney and Tooter (they are seen making non-speaking cameos in "Wish or Wish Out").
61	25	"First Snork in Space"	Lisa Maliani	February 15, 1989	433
Casey meets an alien Snork named Molly and she helps her find medicine to cure her sick father. When Lil' Seaweed follows along, trouble cannot be escaped. Note: This episode marks the final appearance of Lil' Seaweed.
62	26	"I'll Be Senior"	Laren Bright and Lane Raichert	February 22, 1989	431
Grandpa questions his true state of mind because of comments on his age. Meanwhile, the Sea Urchins create a potion that turns much of the Snorkland population into babies.
63	27	"All That Glitters Is Not Goldfish"	Laren Bright and Lane Raichert	March 1, 1989	435
When Jo-Jo and Casey take Corky on a "vacation", they run into Prince Eli of Seagypt and they help him stop his sister, Princess Alexandria, from taking over the kingdom. Prince Eli, however, is a very sneaky Snork. Note: This episode marks the final appearance of Jo-Jo. Governor Wetworth also makes his final appearance, but as a non-speaking cameo.
64	28	"Wish or Wish Out"	Lane Raichert	March 8, 1989	434
Willie, Casey and Allstar each have different problems going on in their lives. The Snailsman returns, offering them a "wishing pearl", so they purchase it and each grant their own wishes, but it goes downhill later on. Notes: Junior, Tooter and Daffney officially make their final appearances in the series, despite not speaking at all. Dimmy makes his final cameo appearance in the series. This also marks Casey, Willie and Occy's final appearances in the series. Corky also makes a final appearance in a non-speaking cameo.
65	29	"My Dinner with Allstar"	Candace Howerton and Jim Pfanner	March 15, 1989	436
Allstar and Bigweed get lost in a different part of the ocean, where they must work together to escape, unless if it involves a magic genie.
