= HBTV =

Series of animated music videos

HBTV logo

HBTV (Hanna-Barbera Television) is a series of animated music videos created by Hanna-Barbera Productions in 1985 and 1986 featuring clips from various animated Hanna-Barbera programmes. The animated videos were similar to Disney's D-TV and MTV and were originally broadcast as interstitials between segments of the syndicated programming block The Funtastic World of Hanna-Barbera.

Each episode of The Funtastic World during the 1985–1987 season featured HBTV segments which included hits like "Bad Moon Rising" by Creedence Clearwater Revival, "Stayin' Alive" by the Bee Gees, "Ghostbusters" by Ray Parker Jr., "Somebody's Watching Me" by Rockwell and many others.

== Home media ==
The following four titles of HBTV videos were released on the VHS, Beta and LaserDisc formats in 1986–1987 by Worldvision Home Video:

=== Hanna-Barbera Presents HBTV: Old Time Rock & Roll ===
Release date: November 8, 1986

- Bob Seger & The Silver Bullet Band: "Old Time Rock and Roll"
- Elvis Presley: "Teddy Bear"
- The Beach Boys: "Catch a Wave"
- Bobby Pickett: "Monster Mash"
- Dave Edmunds: "Da Doo Ron Ron"
- The Marvelettes: "Please Mr. Postman"
- Bill Haley & The Comets: "See You Later, Alligator"
- The Ad Libs: "The Boy from New York City"
- Rare Earth: "I Just Want to Celebrate"
- Bobby Day: "Rockin' Robin"

=== Hanna-Barbera Presents HBTV: Top Rock ===
Release date: November 8, 1986

- Lionel Richie: "All Night Long"
- Ray Parker Jr.: "Ghostbusters"
- The Bee Gees: "Stayin' Alive"
- The Police: "Every Breath You Take"
- Roman Holliday: "Don't Try to Stop It"
- Rockwell: "Somebody's Watching Me"
- Hall & Oates: "You Make My Dreams"
- Huey Lewis and the News: "You Crack Me Up"
- Stevie Wonder: "Whereabouts"
- Aretha Franklin: "Freeway of Love"

=== Hanna-Barbera Presents HBTV: Rock 'N Soul ===
Release date: January 22, 1987

- Martha and the Vandellas: "Dancing in the Street"
- The Temptations: "Get Ready"
- Four Tops: "I Can't Help Myself (Sugar Pie Honey Bunch)"
- Junior Walker & the All Stars: "Money (That's What I Want)"
- Stevie Wonder: "Superstition"
- Diana Ross & the Supremes: "Baby Love"
- Mary Wells: "My Guy"
- Marvin Gaye: "Hitch Hike"
- Diana Ross: "Reach Out and Touch (Somebody's Hand)"
- Stevie Wonder: "Sir Duke"

=== Hanna-Barbera Presents HBTV: Country Rock ===
Release date: January 22, 1987

- The Allman Brothers Band: "Ramblin' Man"
- Creedence Clearwater Revival: "Lookin' out My Back Door"
- The Lovin' Spoonful: "Daydream"
- Juice Newton: "Queen of Hearts"
- Poco: "Crazy Love"
- Creedence Clearwater Revival: "Bad Moon Rising"
- Kenny Rogers: "I Don't Wanna Have to Worry"
- Jerry Lee Lewis: "Great Balls of Fire"
- The Bellamy Brothers: "Let Your Love Flow"
- Pure Prairie League: "Two Lane Highway"
