= Seabert =

- Created by: BZZ Films
- Written by: Jacques Morel; Éric Turlot
- Theme music composer: Marc Tortarolo
- Country of origin: France
- Original languages: French; English
- No. of seasons: 1
- No. of episodes: 26

Original release
- Network: Antenne 2 HBO
- Release: October 3, 1985

Bibifoc (Seabert) is a 1985 French animated series. It was created by BZZ Films in Paris and originally aired in French on Antenne 2, before being translated into different languages around the world. In the United States, the show aired on HBO starting in 1987. There were 26 episodes. The authors are Marc Tortarolo for the theme, Philippe Marin for the design, and Jacques Morel with Éric Turlot for the stories.

== Plot ==
The series is initially set in Greenland. Seabert is about a boy named Tommy, an Inuk girl named Aura, and their "pet" whitecoat seal Seabert. After Seabert's parents are killed by hunters, the three band together. They go on adventures in which they encounter more hunters and poachers (including Tommy's Uncle Smokey, his bumbling henchmen Carbonne and Sulfuric, and a villain named Graphite) and save various animals from harm.

== Production ==
The production for the series was handled by Mill Valley Animation on a contract from SEPP International S.A., the noted Brussels's production house which also featured animation series and properties including The Smurfs, Snorks and Foofur. Jerry Smith, owner of Mill Valley Animation, was also responsible for many of the below the line fulfillment needs of many Hanna-Barbera, Ruby-Spears, and some DIC animation series. Director for Seabert was Dirk Braat of Amsterdam and series voice casting director was Ron Knight, principal of Knight Mediacom (formerly Image One Productions, San Francisco).

=== Production history ===
At the origin of the Seabert project, Match 3 – created by Luc Royer, Philippe Marin and Jacques Morel – was an advertising studio aimed primarily at the comic industry. Marc Tortarolo, sensitivized by the impact of a Scandinavian commercial about the killing of baby seals, proposed the concept of an animated series on the subject.

In order to finance the project, Marc prospected with the European Committee for the Protection of Fur Animals, which allowed the creation of a pilot episode with École de dessin animé de Paris. This pilot was intended to be an advertising spot for the awareness of the cause, but the team went further and wanted to make it a television series.

For the needs of the series, Éric Turlot was hired as co-writer, and the production company BZZ Films was created and managed by Marc Tortarollo. The team looked for ways to broadcast their cartoon but, in 1985, the creation of the two private channels La Cinq and TV6 complicated things. It is with Jacqueline Joubert (head of Antenne 2's youth service) that the studio was able to launch the series (in premises at 20, rue J.J. Rousseau in Ivry-sur-Seine). They completed the team in order to start producing Seabert.

== Episode list ==
No.	Title	Original release date
1	"A New Friendship"	TBA
Uncle Smokey takes Tommy to Greenland. Tommy meets a baby seal he names Seabert. Finding that his uncle is a baby seal hunter, Tommy leaves his side and takes Seabert to safety.
2	"The Trio"	TBA
Tommy and Seabert meet Aura and the three are given an important job to protect wildlife by the Eskimos. Meanwhile, Smokey and his gang give up trying to win Tommy's trust and try to hunt baby seals. The Eskimos show up and chase away Smokey's gang. Tommy, Aura and Seabert follow a helicopter to a seal poaching camp ran by a man named Graphite. They sabotage Graphite's helicopter successfully, giving Graphite and his men the slip.
3	"Radio Message"	TBA
Tommy, Aura and Seabert, now a team, are captured by Graphite and his men and locked up in the seal fur camp. Seabert, able to fit through tight spaces, goes off in search for help, but falls in a canyon crevice after being chased there by a polar bear. The Eskimos find Seabert and rescue him then proceed to confront Graphite's poaching camp to not only rescue Tommy and Aura, but also rescue the countless baby seals that are held captive there.
4	"Leopard Smugglers"	TBA
Tommy and Seabert are out taking photos of Leopards at the waterhole and notice there are hardly any Leopards there. Tommy and Seabert go back to Harry's headquarters to relax. During the night, two thieves steal some paperwork. Tommy and Seabert chase after the thieves only to run out of gas. They are brought back to Harry's and go to bed. The next morning Tommy and Seabert, on their way to pick up Aura from the docks, stumble upon the same thieves and board their ship looking for their stolen paperwork. After the ship takes off, they discover there are leopards in cages on board being smuggled. Tommy radios Harry but is caught by the smugglers and handed over to Graphite and his men. Aura and Seabert come to the rescue, release the captured leopards and foil Graphite's plan yet again.
5	"Rock 'n Rescue"	TBA
Tommy, Aura and Seabert are on their way home to Greenland on a ship. While vacationing, Aura is kidnapped by someone on the boat who is working for Graphite. Seabert rescues Aura and then a popular band named "The Offenders" give hand to Team Seabert. They all foil Graphite's plans to keep team Seabert away from Greenland.
6	"The Saboteur"	TBA
Tommy and Seabert travel to a conference in Africa to show the film they made about saving animals, but a saboteur, hired by a mysterious man, tries to ruin the conference by stealing the film and replacing it with a film focusing on hunters killing animals.
7	"The Sea Otters"	TBA
Smokey and his gang set off in a submarine to capture sea otters. Meanwhile, Tommy and Aura notice that the sea otter population has been disappearing and investigate. Smokey, Sulfuric and Carbonne become trapped at the bottom of the ocean in their submarine. Sulfuric is sent to the surface to get them help and he runs into the authorities. They rescue the sea otters along with Smokey and Carbonne.
8	"Iceberg Ahead"	TBA
Tommy, Aura and Seabert home in Greenland, receive a distress call from a ship called the Borealis. The ship begins to sink while the Seabert team comes to the rescue. Meanwhile, Graphite and his men are catching baby seals in their ship which has been disguised to look like an iceberg. Seabert comes to the rescue and foils Graphite's plans.
9	"Panda-monium"	TBA
Sulfuric plants a bug on Tommy's shoe to listen in on the mission given to Tommy and Seabert. Sulfuric is sent to get a getaway vehicle while Smokey and Carbonne get on the train that's transporting a panda bear.
10	"The Fur Factory"	TBA
Tommy tries to save Seabert and a group of captured whitecoat seals escape from Graphite's fur factory.
11	"Twenty Feet Under Ice"	TBA
Tommy tries to escape an underground hideaway after He is captured by Graphite, while Seabert searches for him.
12	"The Yeti"	TBA
Tommy, Aura and Seabert are sent to the Himalayas to answer the mystery of the disappearing white hares. The mountain locals claim that the Yeti is responsible, and the trio go off in search of the Yeti.
13	"Whale Mission"	TBA
Tommy, Aura and Seabert go shopping with their own shopping lists. Seabert eats everything he bought. Tommy is troubled by the news about whale poachers. Tommy vows to stop the whale hunting solo and tells Aura to stay. Aura argues that she is useful to the team and Tommy decides to take her along. Tommy educates Aura on whale facts while Seabert films the whales under the water with Tommy's new video camera. The whalers are distraught by Tommy swimming with the whales. Seabert helps to stop the whaler's by teaching the whales how to defend themselves against the boats. Tommy gets knocked unconscious by a whale accidentally. Using the opportunity the whalers kidnap him. Tommy escapes and discourages whalers to give up by being persistently annoying.
14	"Petnappers in Paris"	TBA
Tommy calls Aura to Paris to investigate a case of missing pets. They devise to use a rabbit named "Big Foot" to attract the attention of the petnappers. Seabert follows an ice block salesman who uses Seabert as a mascot to sell his ice. Meanwhile, Tommy and Aura meet a man named Draculo who pays them to take the rabbit to his boss, a doctor who kidnaps pets. Aura goes into the hideout to deal with the petnappers and Tommy calls for reinforcements. The Petnappers are apprehended and team Seabert saves the day once again.
15	"Bungle in the Jungle"	TBA
Team Seabert camp out at the Venezuelan Rain Forest to photograph the wildlife, but Graphite and his henchmen is chopping down the rain forest.
16	"Deadly Plans"	TBA
Graphite hires Uncle Smokey to unknowingly dump poison in the ocean. Meanwhile, Seabert is poisoned after eating a dead fish who fell victim by the poison.
17	"The Kidnapping"	TBA
Graphite burns the fur warehouses, and multiple villagers hostage and force them to hunt baby seals, in hopes of monopolizing the sealskin market.
18	"Alpine Adventure"	TBA
Tommy, Aura and Seabert visit Tommy's uncle in the Alpine mountains to learn how to ski. Meanwhile, poachers trick Tommy's uncle and convince him to hire them as working mechanics so they can hunt animals during the day. Tommy and Seabert investigate after Aura spots an elk being shot. After losing their rifle to Seabert, the poachers try to head towards the border to avoid the authorities, but an avalanche causes them to be caught.
19	"The Land of the Mayas"	TBA
Tommy gets a radio call from a local named Don Ramone from Guatemala about bird poachers. Meanwhile, Smokey's crew is capturing tropical birds so they can sell to collectors. Back at the local's village, Tommy and Aura are told the Mayan lore of the Quetzal feathers. Smokey's gang, looking for the same birds, stumble onto a Mayan temple sanctuary with many of the birds surrounding the area. Team Seabert catches up to Smokey's gang and save the village boy named Raul who was guiding them. They all get trapped in the temple sanctuary maze. Aura and Raul are separated from Tommy and Seabert, which fall into a trap. When Aura and Raul catch up to Smokey's gang, Raul warns Smokey about the curse of Quetzalcoatl. After a Mayan light show, a figure in a bird costume scares Smokey's gang leading them to release all the captured birds. The costumed man turns out to be Don Ramone. The day is saved again thanks to team Seabert.
20	"Poached Turtle Eggs"	TBA
Tommy decides to turn over his footage from their previous adventure of discouraging the whalers. Tommy radios a man named "Watching Panda" and they meet up with a fellow wildlife protector. He takes them to his home and introduces them to his wife. While they eat, he explains his life to Tommy and Aura. He also mentions he was a forest ranger and a captain of a pacific liner. Tommy decides to turn over his footage to the UN but "Panda" asks them to help him rescue the turtle eggs from poachers. He takes them on a boat and the crew travel to an island. Seabert notices lights on the beach and team Seabert go and investigate without Panda. Sure enough, they run into some turtle egg poachers who are selling the eggs to restaurants. Tommy causes a ruckus and scares off the poachers. They rescue a turtle and head back to the boat to report to Panda. Panda calls the police and Tommy and Aura celebrate by playing hula on guitar and dance. In the morning, Tommy accidentally scares Seabert and Seabert causes a ruckus. The police arrive but they are unable to help. Tommy devises a plan to prevent the turtles from coming onto the beach, but the turtles break through. The poachers return and Tommy confronts them. The poachers tie up and silence Tommy and Aura. The poachers knock Panda out, but the police is also there. They arrest the poachers and then proceed to rescue the kids.
21	"The Ivory Hunters"	TBA
Tommy and Seabert travel to Africa and help a game warden confront a group of elephant hunters.
22	"The Professor's Whistle"	TBA
Smokey and his crew, running out of money, meet a professor who specializes in mimicry, and obtain a whistle that can mimic the sound of a seal in the hopes of catching more seals to profit from.
23	"The Hunters' Blues"	TBA
Tommy and Seabert track down two poachers.
24	"Monkey Business"	TBA
Team Seabert try to stop a group of poachers from targeting gorillas, but Smokey and his henchmen arrive.
25	"The Unicorn"	TBA
Tommy, Aura and Seabert go with their friend to Africa to protect a rhino from being poached by ivory hunters. Smokey and his gang mess up a shipment of ivory by dropping a rhino horn into the bay and they have to replace it.
26	"Photo Set Up"	TBA
While looking at the newspaper, Tommy notices an article about Panda hurting wildlife. The team then decide to head back to the village to prepare for an investigation. On their way there, a mysterious plane flies above them and chases the crew into a cave. The plane lands and a recording of baby seals lures the group into the plane. They are then flown to an area that has many props and scenery like a movie studio. Graphite intends to frame the children by showing the world photos of them hurting wildlife like they have already done to their other kidnapped friends. As they escape, they rescue Harry King, Panda, and Aura's father.

== Music ==
- Theme of the Smokey's Gang - Ol' Soft Shoe by Network Music Ensemble
- Smokey's Gang Hijinks - That's All Folks! by Network Music Ensemble

== See also ==
- List of French animated television series
- List of French television series
