= Monster Mania =

- Genre: Animation
- Created by: Phil Mendez
- Written by: Susan Talkington; Brian Miller
- Directed by: Terry Lennon
- Voices of: Jim Cummings; Jeannie Elias; Tress MacNeille; Frank Welker; Jeff Bennett; Mark Hamill; E. G. Daily; Mark L. Taylor; Miriam Flynn; Jess Harnell; Billy Vera
- Composer: Eric Troyer
- Country of origin: United States
- Original language: English
- No. of seasons: 1
- No. of episodes: 26

Production
- Producer: Chris Henderson
- Running time: 22 minutes
- Production companies: Hallmark Entertainment; Kookanooga Toons; Action Media Group

Original release
- Network: First-run syndication
- Release: September 11, 1995 – 1996

Monster Mania is an American animated television series created by Phil Mendez (creator of Kissyfur and Foofur), and inspired by the "Creatures of Delight" toyline. The series aired in first-run syndication in the United States starting in the week of September 11, 1995; and on CITV in the United Kingdom.

26 half-hour episodes were produced throughout 1995 and 1996. A second season was planned to release in fall of 1996. This never came to fruition, possibly due to it averaging just a 1.2 among kids 2-11, and Action Media Group's bankruptcy that year.

== Plot summary ==
When his aunt Jane goes missing from her haunted mansion, ten-year-old Brian McKenzie (voiced by Jeannie Elias) and his parents, Olive McKenzie (voiced by Miriam Flynn) and Stan McKenzie (voiced by Mark L. Taylor) move into Aunt Jane's house and Brian meets a giant blue monster named Boo Marang (voiced by Jim Cummings), who emerges from a bedpost and takes Brian to Monster Mania, a world of monsters living inside closets around the world. Together, Brian, Boo and several other monsters help the boy find his missing aunt while fighting villains such as Osh (voiced by Mark Hamill). The series involved dream pirates, balloon creatures, a giant garden, Robin Hood character lookalikes, fairy tales, and more.

== Voice cast ==
- Jim Cummings as Boo Marang and Sootybush
- Jeannie Elias as Brian McKenzie and Jamm
- Tress MacNeille as Gertie, Fudge and Taxi
- Frank Welker as Nougat, Droodblossom and Underwood
- Jeff Bennett as Thomas (the bully)
- Mark Hamill as Osh, Bellylint and Doorman
- E. G. Daily as Maliboo
- Mark L. Taylor as Stan McKenzie
- Miriam Flynn as Olive McKenzie
- Jess Harnell
- Billy Vera

== Episodes ==
Of the intended 26 produced episodes, only six of the titles have been found in the United States Copyright Office; the whereabouts of the other 20 are unknown. The series' creator, Phil Mendez, also registered several character names.

- "Maliboo", an episode about Brian having a shapeshifting monster buddy called Maliboo and he has to save a school bully named Thomas from balloon creatures.
- "Dream a Little Dream"
- "Some of My Best Friends Are Rats"
- "Dream Pirates"
- "Wannabe"
- "There and Back Again"
