= List of SWAT Kats: The Radical Squadron episodes =

The following is a complete list of episodes for SWAT Kats: The Radical Squadron, a television cartoon series created by Christian and Yvon Tremblay. SWAT Kats: The Radical Squadron premiered on TBS Superstation's The Funtastic World of Hanna-Barbera block in the United States on September 11, 1993 and ended on January 6, 1995.

The series consists of a total of 25 original episodes over two seasons, including four "half" episodes ("SWAT Kats Unplugged", "Cry Turmoil", "Volcanus Erupts!" and "The Origin of Dr. Viper" – running around 15 minutes in length) aired during the second season. A "documentary" episode featuring clips from previous episodes aired as a sort of closer once the series was cancelled. This brings the total number of broadcast episodes to 26. Nine episodes from Season 1 are animated by Hanho Heung-Up Co., Ltd., four episodes from Season 1 ("The Pastmaster Always Rings Twice", "Night of the Dark Kat", "Metal Urgency", and "Katastrophe") and all episodes from Season 2 are animated by Mook Animation Inc. There were also three episodes in production at the time of the series' cancellation as well as two that never made it past the concept stage. The first season consists of thirteen episodes; the second season consists of thirteen episodes. Also, the show's distinctive opening and closing theme music changed during production of the second season to a heavier, more metal-influenced theme, as well as the character design becoming more angular.

Every episode of the series was directed by Robert Alvarez. The bulk of the series was written by Glenn Leopold (13 episodes) and Lance Falk (6 episodes). Jim Stenstrum contributed two episodes, while David Ehrman, Von Williams, Eric Clark (with Lance Falk), Mark Saraceni and Jim Katz all contributed one episode. Lance Falk's ideas were usually very ambitious and inventive, and this was usually met with the studio executives telling him to change his ideas to something more simple, such as making the Aquians "kat" aliens instead of humans in "When Strikes Mutilor" or to cut out entire characters and subplots, such as making Commander Feral the one Turmoil successfully corrupts in "Cry Turmoil".

The cancellation of the series occurred near the end of season two's production. The reason why is not exactly known, but the show's violence, declining viewership and its inability to move merchandise have been cited as the most likely causes. At the time, Hanna-Barbera was busy on Cartoon Network's ambitious cartoon anthology series What a Cartoon! which may also have contributed to the cancelation.

== Series overview ==
Season	Episodes	Originally released	
Season	Episodes	First released	Last released
1	13	September 11, 1993	December 4, 1993
2	13	September 10, 1994	January 6, 1995

== Episodes ==
=== Season 1 (1993) ===
No. overall	No. in season	Title	Written by	Original release date
1	1	"The Pastmaster Always Rings Twice"	Glenn Leopold	September 11, 1993
In an old graveyard outside Megakat City, grave robbers are digging around for valuable artifacts when they find a large chest. Inside they find the Pastmaster, an ancient evil wizard who was imprisoned within the chest 800 years ago. The Pastmaster heads to the Megakat City Museum of History to search for his spell book, the Tome of Time. Callie Briggs is at the museum preparing for the opening and summons the SWAT Kats to help defeat the Pastmaster. After locating his spell book, the Pastmaster wants to bring back the Dark Ages and opens a time vortex that brings a "Megasaurus Rex" to the present time. The SWAT Kats are sucked into the portal and are sent back to the time of the dinosaurs. As the Pastmaster ravages Megakat City with the Megasaurus Rex, the SWAT Kats try to get back to the present and prevent the Pastmaster from casting a spell to bring the Dark Ages to the present.
2	2	"The Giant Bacteria"	Glenn Leopold	September 18, 1993
An evil pilot named Morbulus who literally has an extra set of eyes on the back of his head is shot down into the bay by the SWAT Kats when he tries to destroy Megakat City's oil refineries. He escapes and meets the half kat, half snake mad scientist Dr. Viper in the city sewers. Dr. Viper takes Morbulus back to his lab in the swamp and applies a drop of liquid to his arm, causing him to mutate into a "living test tube"; a huge, oozing bacterial monster. The bacteria then proceeds with Dr. Viper into the city via the sewer to break into Megakat Biochemical Labs. While rampaging through the city, it is discovered that the bacteria splits into separate entities if damaged or destroyed. The SWAT Kats suit up, and with the help of Callie Briggs and Dr. N. Zyme, prepare to stop the bacteria and Dr. Viper before they can cause any more harm.
3	3	"The Wrath of Dark Kat"	Jim Stenstrum	September 25, 1993
When the SWAT Kats' arch-nemesis Dark Kat steals the material for a homemade nuclear bomb to destroy Megakat City, neither the SWAT Kats nor the Enforcers can break through his defensive forcefield. Commander Feral tries to sneak aboard Dark Kat's ship to defeat Mega Kat city's most wanted and retrieve the stolen parts, but is quickly subdued. The ambitious Lt. Steel (Hal Rayle), Feral's slimy second-in-command, would rather advance his career than rescue his boss, so it is up to the SWAT Kats to save both Feral and their home. In the middle of the episode, there's a flashback revealing how Jake and Chance became the vigilantes they are today. Having used to have been members of Feral's Enforcer aerial squadron, while in pursuit of Dark Kat for the first time, Commander Feral demanded they break course so he could make the bust. Their superior knocked their jet off course, which ended up crashing into Enforcer Headquarters, causing considerable amounts of property damage. Despite claims to the contrary blame wise, the two are subsequently kicked off the force and are made to take a job at the City Salvage Yard to pay for renovations. There they use old airplane and engine parts of downed Enforcer aviaries to create the Turbokat and become the SWAT Kats.
4	4	"Destructive Nature"	Lance Falk	October 2, 1993
The 300-story Megakat Tower office building is about to open for business, but its first tenant is a most unwelcome one: Dr. Viper, who seizes the structure with his army of monstrous, acid-spitting "plantimals." He places a huge "spore pod" on top of the penthouse; when it explodes, it will cover Megakat City with spores, turning the metropolis into the "Megaswamp City" of Viper's fantasies. Obviously, the SWAT Kats can't allow this. However, Viper's mutations are immune to most of the SWAT Kat's missiles, leaving T-Bone to run interference in the Turbokat while Razor sneaks into the building and tries to stop Viper with the help of Callie Briggs, who happened to be in the tower when it was taken over by Viper.
5	5	"The Metallikats"	Jim Stenstrum	October 9, 1993
In a flashback, Mac and Molly escape from the maximum security prison of "Alkatraz" by boat, but while in the middle of the bay, they are hit by a passing ship and drown. They wash ashore near the laboratory of Professor Hackle (voiced by George Hearn), a former weapons designer now working to create and invent things to help the world. They are discovered by two of Hackle's robots. He scans Mac and Molly's minds onto hard drives and puts them into the robots. They nickname themselves "The Metallikats" since they are now made out of metal. Despite the hopes of Professor Hackle, the Metallikats decide to continue their villainous exploits and use their new robot bodies to their advantage. After taking out a fellow crime boss, they set their sights on Mayor Manx, whom they believed denied their parole (when in reality it was Deputy Mayor Callie Briggs). The SWAT Kats must race to save both Callie and the Mayor from being terminated by the Metallikats.
6	6	"Bride of the Pastmaster"	Glenn Leopold	October 16, 1993
The episode begins with Jake fancying himself and talking about Callie while Chance falls in love with Feral, then the SWAT Kats battling an enormous oil-sucking eel that has been attacking oil tankers heading for Megakat City. Using all but one missile, the duo defeat the creature and prepare to fly home. However, the Pastmaster opens a time vortex near Megakat City which (unbeknownst to the Pastmaster) sucks the SWAT Kats into it. The SWAT Kats emerge in the Dark Ages where they are thought to be sorcerers (due to their "flying machine") and are attacked by Queen Callista (a medieval version of Callie Briggs) and her medieval knights. Upon yanking a sword from a nearby stone, Razor is believed to be the foretold warrior that will protect them from the Pastmaster. The duo learn that the Pastmaster has threatened to destroy "Megalith City" unless Queen Callista marries him. The Pastmaster summons two cyclopes and two dragons to aid him with his plan. With the Turbokat damaged and almost no modern weaponry, the SWAT Kats must protect Megalith City, destroy the rampaging monsters, vanquish the Pastmaster and get back to the present with the help of Queen Callista.
7	7	"Night of the Dark Kat"	David Ehrman	October 23, 1993
The SWAT Kats are out testing a newly installed turbo engine on the Turbokat when they intercept an Enforcer emergency broadcast. A villain known as Hard Drive has broken into a top secret military research center and stolen defense secrets. Hard Drive has the unique ability to travel through anything electrical as a surge of electricity using his "Surge Coat". The SWAT Kats track his surge signal and subdue him in a special insulated missile. After being taken to a jail cell, Hard Drive is broken out by Dark Kat and his Creeplings. Dark Kat forces Hard Drive to team up with him to help capture, discredit and destroy the SWAT Kats using the Turbokat to hold the city hostage. The SWAT Kats are captured by Dark Kat using Hard Drive as bait in an abandoned cat litter factory. As Dark Kat prepares the SWAT Kats to be crushed in a litter grinder, Hard Drive steals the Turbokat and wreaks havoc on the city. Commander Feral, Mayor Manx and even Callie Briggs question the SWAT Kats' actions. It is up to them to escape the grinder, clear their name and defeat the evil duo before it is too late.
8	8	"Chaos in Crystal"	Lance Falk	October 30, 1993
Convict Rex Shard is serving a life sentence at Megakat Maximum Security Prison and is forced to mine diamonds for Warden Cyrus Meece. While using a new type of diamond mining machine, the Gemkat 6000 – created by Dr. Lieter Greenbox (voiced by Robert Patrick), Shard tries to steal some of the diamonds collected in the machine. The machine explodes and crystals fuse to the left half of Shard's body. Exiting the mine, Shard touches the prison guards watching over him and turns them into solid crystals. Shard realizes his new power and, after converting his entire body to crystal form, he goes on a rampage, seeking revenge against Warden Meece, Dr. Greenbox and anyone else who gets in his way by turning them into crystals. While doing a test run of new missiles in the desert, the SWAT Kats pick up a strange signal from the prison and go to investigate. It is up to them to put a stop the crystal menace and save Megakat City.
9	9	"The Ghost Pilot"	Von Williams	November 6, 1993
While working on construction for the new Megakat Marina, a crane operator pulls an old MegaWar II biplane out of Megakat Bay. It is discovered to be the plane of the Red Lynx, one of the greatest pilots of MegaWar II, but also one of the most evil. During Megawar II, the Red Lynx and the Blue Manx (the great-grandfather of Mayor Manx) were arch-enemies and engaged in countless dogfights. The plane is taken to the Megakat Museum of History and put on display in the aviation wing. That night, the spirit of the Red Lynx (voiced by Mark Hamill) is resurrected and takes control of his plane, flying it out of the museum. The Red Lynx is still out for vengeance against his arch-rival and sets his sights on his descendant, Mayor Manx. T-Bone is a huge admirer of the Red Lynx and marvels at his flying skills. When the Red Lynx steals a new, highly advanced Enforcer jet, the SWAT Kats have their hands full trying to take him down and clear the skies.
10	10	"Metal Urgency"	Lance Falk and Eric Clark	November 13, 1993
Professor Hackle reactivates the Metallikats in hopes of reprogramming out all of their criminal tendencies. The Metallikats want absolutely no part of this and escape to continue their life of crime. While searching for their hovercraft, "The Metallikat Express", in the salvage yard, they discover the SWAT Kats' airplane hangar and attack them. Razor manages to crush them with the Turbokat's turntable lift, however he realizes that he only crushed their metal bodies and their heads have escaped with the knowledge of the SWAT Kats' true identities. To complicate matters further, the Metallikats hijack enormous space exploration robots (also invented by Hackle) from Pumadyne called "Macro Bots" that have been converted into military war machines and wreak havoc on the city. The SWAT Kats must stop the giant robots and keep the Metallikats from revealing who they really are.
11	11	"The Ci-Kat-A"	Glenn Leopold	November 20, 1993
An exploration probe returns from its mission in space and is taken to "MASA" – Megakat Aeronautics and Space Administration. It is analyzed by Dr. Harley Street (voiced by Robert Ridgely) who discovers a yellow viscous substance oozing from inside the probe. Upon investigating it, a large cicada with catlike features emerges and bites Dr. Street on his finger. He quickly transforms into a half-kat, half-cicada creature and helps the original cicada transform more kats into mind controlled drones. Dr. Street takes the ci-kat-a to Megakat Nuclear Plant where it eats some of the radioactive reactor core and grows to an enormous size. With the help Dr. Street, it begins a hive in the newly re-opened Megakat Tower to reach their ultimate goal: infestation of the entire planet. The SWAT Kats (Razor and T-Bone) must eliminate the threat, which is more difficult due to T-Bone's fear of bugs.
12	12	"Enter the Madkat"	Glenn Leopold	November 27, 1993
In Megakat Asylum for the Insane and "Katatonic", a psychopathic comedian named Lenny Ringtail (most likely named after real life comedian Lenny Bruce) is being kept in a padded room in a straitjacket. Ringtail (voiced by Roddy McDowall) went crazy when he was rejected as host for a late night talk show that eventually went to David Litterbin (most likely named after David Letterman). Ringtail manages to escape the asylum and while looking for a place to hide, stumbles upon an old magic shop. There he finds an old jack-in-the-box that resembles him. After knocking out the store owner (voiced by James Hong), he is possessed by the ghost of an ancient jester who suffered similar rejection hundreds of years ago. He turns into Madkat, a psychotic, shape-shifting joker who plans to kidnap the king, queen, knight and jester of Megakat City (Mayor Manx, Callie Briggs, Commander Feral and David Litterbin, respectively). Even the SWAT Kats can't stop Madkat's reality warping tricks, and they must rescue everyone and vanquish Madkat before he goes too far.
13	13	"Katastrophe"	Glenn Leopold	December 4, 1993
While trying to infiltrate Megakat Biochemical Labs, Dr. Viper encounters Dark Kat's Creeplings stealing the very thing he came for, Katalyst 100. The SWAT Kats arrive to stop Dark Kat and Viper, but a miscalculation by Razor allows them both to escape into the sewers and blows up the building. Dark Kat suggests to Viper that they join forces to destroy the SWAT Kats once and for all. Dark Kat agrees and decides to gain another ally in the Metallikats. The reactivated Metallikats initially refuse to help Dark Kat and Viper, but Dark Kat anticipated this and places the duo in "neuroscrambler" collars, which force them to do his bidding. The SWAT Kats face their greatest challenge yet in defeating the power quartet, though internal fighting and mistrust just may work to their advantage.

=== Season 2 (1994–95) ===
No. overall	No. in season	Title	Written by	Original release date
14	1	"Mutation City"	Glenn Leopold	September 10, 1994
Dr. Viper floods Megakat City with a slimy orange ooze created from Katalyst X-63, an experimental formula that mutates any living thing it touches into grotesque, menacing versions of themselves. These creatures wreak havoc across the city, attacking Mayor Manx, Callie Briggs and anyone else it comes into contact with. The SWAT Kats are called by Callie to help the city, but the various mutated creatures prove to be tougher than expected. At the Enforcers Biotech Lab, they discover an anti-mutagen that will help return the creatures and the city to its normal state. While flying to Megakat Biochemical Labs to retrieve mass quantities of the anti-mutagen, they are attacked while T-Bone gets bitten by one of the creatures and mutates into a monster. Meanwhile, Dr. Viper douses himself in Katalyst X-63, turns into a huge Godzilla-like monster and rampages through the city. It is up to Razor alone to get the anti-mutagen onto the Turbokat, detonate it in the center of the city and turn everything, including T-Bone, back to normal. T-Bone's inability to swim complicates things even further when he nearly drowns twice. T-Bone faces his fear of swimming and saves Razor from drowning, while Razor is unconscious at the end of the show when the anti-mutagen turns him back to normal.
15	2	"A Bright and Shiny Future"	Glenn Leopold	September 17, 1994
The Pastmaster is wreaking havoc on Megakat Bridge when the SWAT Kats arrive to stop him. The Pastmaster anticipated this, opens up a time vortex and forces the SWAT Kats and himself into it. They re-emerge in a futuristic city made up almost entirely of metal, patrolled exclusively by robots where kats are forced to work in labor camps. On an enormous Jumbotron-like screen in the center of the city, the Metallikats appear and inform the SWAT Kats that in this future, they are the rulers of "Metallikat City." As it turns out, the Pastmaster conspired with the Metallikats and planned the entire thing, but the Metallikats double cross the Pastmaster and steal his magical pocket watch, breaking their original deal. After being attacked by a gigantic transforming bridge robot, the SWAT Kats escape to Megakat Swamp where they encounter the only remaining survivors: Mayor Manx, Callie Briggs, Professor Hackle, Commander Feral and Lt. Felina Feral. Together, they decide to try to overthrow the Metallikats with a little help from a very angry Pastmaster, who will promise to return them to the present Megakat City if they recover his watch.
16	3	"When Strikes Mutilor"	Lance Falk	September 24, 1994
An enormous spaceship arrives to steal the planet's water supply to sell to water-dependent aliens. The spaceship is controlled by Mutilor (voiced by Michael Dorn), a large lobster-like creature who hijacked the ship from the Aquians, a peaceful race of kat-like aliens. Mutilor is a space pirate and plans to suck the planet dry and leave it to perish. The Enforcers try to stop him, but they are ineffective, as usual. Lt. Felina Feral's plane is shot down, but not before taking out a few of Mutilor's enemy squadron fighters. The SWAT Kats, putting the finishing touches on a new Turbokat with an enhanced "Speed of Heat" flying mode, must utilize an alternate vehicle to defend the planet. They modify their tow truck to try and defeat Mutilor. Unsuccessful, they jetpack back to the hangar to get the Turbokat operational so they can save the planet's water supply with the help of the Aquians and Lt. Feral. Note: After this episode, the series took a short one-month hiatus before broadcasting again.
17	4	"Razor's Edge"	Mark Saraceni	October 29, 1994
Dark Kat is up to his usual evil antics, this time stealing super conductive cable from an electrical lab. The SWAT Kats intervene and while in pursuit of Dark Kat's spider-like craft, they fire two non-explosive Octopus missiles at him. Dark Kat evades the missiles, which blow up an abandoned warehouse. Apparently, the warehouse wasn't so abandoned and two elderly passers-by are injured in the explosion. After realizing what he has done, Razor loses his nerve and refuses to fight anymore for fear of hurting more innocent people. But Razor fights the creeplings alone, and Razor remembers Callie (but mentioned). To make matters even worse, Razor uses a phone booth to call Felina, then Razor needs to buy two things before the hospital. Dark Kat has done some serious modifications on his spider craft, turning it into a walking, energy-consuming behemoth so he can level Megakat City. T-Bone realizes he must combat Dark Kat by himself without the help of Razor. Meanwhile, Razor goes to visit the two people he injured in the warehouse explosion, who berate him for being so careless and willing to hurt innocent bystanders. However, one of them accidentally reveals they are working for Dark Kat and Razor realizes the entire incident was staged. After defeating them, Razor gets his "edge" back while using his sacrifice and must help T-Bone stop Dark Kat before he destroys the city.
18	5	"Cry Turmoil"	Lance Falk	November 5, 1994
A commercial airliner is sabotaged by an unseen attacker but safely landed with the help of the SWAT Kats. The attacker reveals herself as Turmoil, a vicious she-kat dressed in Nazi-like attire. She is the captain of an enormous airship containing the most advanced and powerful technology on the planet. Her greatest accomplishment is the "Vertigo Beam," a device that renders any aircraft unflyable by severely disorienting the pilot and passengers. Turmoil wants Megakat City to pay her two million dollars in gold every week to use what she now deems "her airspace." The SWAT Kats will not stand for this and try a head-on attack, where Turmoil is amazed by T-Bone's flying skills. The SWAT Kats are eventually hit with the Vertigo Beam and drawn into the airship with a tractor beam, but not before T-Bone ejects an unconscious Razor. Turmoil explains that T-Bone is one of the greatest pilots she has ever seen and does not want such skill to go to waste. She offers T-Bone a position as "flight commander", second only to her. T-Bone accepts, but with an ulterior motive to defeat her once Razor finds his way on board. Note: This episodes only lasted as half as long as a normal episode, so it was paired with "SWAT Kats Unplugged" when it aired.
19	6	"SWAT Kats Unplugged"	Glenn Leopold	November 5, 1994
A hyena-like villain named Chopshop (voiced by Nick Chinlund) is being pursued by the SWAT Kats in his highly advanced helicopter. After a brief but intense aerial dogfight, the SWAT Kats manage to subdue Chopshop and hand him over to the Enforcers. Ann Gora interviews them and Razor comments on having the help of their high-tech gadgetry. Meanwhile, Hard Drive has somehow escaped and steals a recently invented anti-weapons scrambler from Pumadyne scientist Dr. Ohm. With this, Hard Drive prepares to steal the gold being transferred from the Megakat Mint to the City's banks on the newly constructed Megakat Railway. The SWAT Kats come to stop him, but all of their weapons are disabled by the weapons scramber. It is up to Razor and T-Bone to outwit rather than outgun their opponent and retrieve the gold. Note: This episode aired on the same day as "Cry Turmoil", due to its running time of only seven and a half minutes.
20	7	"The Deadly Pyramid"	Glenn Leopold	November 12, 1994
The SWAT Kats are asked by Professor Hackle to come out to his lab where he introduces Cybertron, a small feline robot designed to help the SWAT Kats. Razor thinks it is a neat invention, but T-Bone dislikes it while complaining. Across town, Dr. Sinian and a few others have discovered the ancient ruins of Katchu Picchu and are in the process of excavating the site. Unfortunately, the Pastmaster arrives and using a golden head dress, unearths an enormous Mayan pyramid. Once inside he reanimates a group of huge and indestructible mummies to do his evil bidding, which is to take over Megakat City. The commando mummies wreak all sorts of havoc and all weapons (including the SWAT Kats' missiles) are completely ineffective in stopping them. The Pastmaster notices that Callie Briggs looks very similar to Queen Callista from "Bride of the Pastmaster" and commands the mummies to bring her back to the pyramid so he can marry her. The SWAT Kats, with the help of the courageous Cybertron (Who finally gains T-Bone's respect after protecting Dr. Sinian from the mummies), realize that destroying the mummies' glass face shields is the only way to kill them. After disposing of the mummies attacking the city, the SWAT Kats head to the pyramid to save Callie and stop the Pastmaster.
21	8	"Caverns of Horror"	Glenn Leopold	November 19, 1994
While digging for Agracite, a fictitious metal used for construction, five miners disappear within the mine caverns. When Ann Gora and Kats Eye News go down with Lt. Felina Feral to investigate, Ann Gora is grabbed by a giant claw and pulled deeper underground. The SWAT Kats show up and using their latest invention, the Turbo Mole, drill eight miles into the planet and emerge in an underground system of tunnels with Lt. Feral. They explore the caverns and are quickly attacked by giant rock scorpions that have mutated by ingesting illegally dumped toxic waste from the mining company. After avoiding and defeating many of the scorpions, they locate Ann Gora (along with the remains of the five missing miners) and are attacked by the gigantic "mother" scorpion which can extend its neck to great lengths. The SWAT Kats must rescue Ann Gora, escape the mutated scorpions and get back to the surface before they become the scorpion's next meal.
22	9	"Volcanus Erupts!"	Glenn Leopold	November 26, 1994
Mayor Manx and his associate Mr. Young are planning to build an industrial park on the tropical paradise of Anakata Island. One of the islanders (voiced by Clyde Kusatsu) warns Manx that if the island's sacred stone is destroyed, bad things will happen. The stone is crushed by a bulldozer and an enormous rock monster named Volcanus (voiced by Frank Welker) erupts from the island's volcano, freed from his 1,000-year lava prison. The SWAT Kats' weapons are ineffective against his rock body and must resort to finding a weak spot in the rock to destroy Volcanus before he attacks Megakat Nuclear Power Plant and decimates the city. Note: This episode aired with "The Origin of Dr. Viper", due to its running time of only 15 minutes.
23	10	"The Origin of Dr. Viper"	Glenn Leopold	November 26, 1994
Dr. N. Zyme and Dr. Elrod Purvis engineer Viper Mutagen 368, a regenerative growth formula. Zyme imagines the benefits of the mutagen to mankind and tells Purvis he could not have done it without him. Purvis is uncaring, and only wants to sell the mutagen to the highest bidder and become rich. Zyme leaves the lab and Purvis steals the mutagen and its research for himself, only to be discovered by Zyme and pursued into the building's stairwell. Purvis trips down the stairs and becomes covered in the growth formula. He then collapses, supposedly dead and is taken to the morgue. Dr. Zyme discovers that the mutagen is ineffective and mutates its host into an evil monstrosity. Purvis is mutated by the formula and becomes Dr. Viper, taking his name from the mutagen itself. He then proceeds to apply the mutagen to mosquitos and honey bees to attack those responsible for his mutation. Note: This episode aired with "Volcanus Erupts!", due to its running time of only 15 minutes.
24	11	"The Dark Side of the SWAT Kats"	Jim Katz	December 10, 1994
A stray lightning bolt hits the Turbokat while the SWAT Kats are testing their new dimensional radar system, which results in them being hurled into an alternate dimension where evil versions of themselves are not only wanted for just about every crime in Megakat City, but are also working for Dark Kat. Mistaken for the Dark SWAT Kats by Dark Kat, Razor and T-Bone are sent to Pumadyne to steal the Mega-Detonator, a key component for an implosion bomb which the criminal mastermind plans to use to destroy Enforcer Headquarters. When Dark Kat realizes he made a mistake, he sends the real Dark SWAT Kats to kill their good counterparts and acquire the Mega-Detonator. Making things even more complicated for the vigilante duo are the fact that Callie Briggs is also evil and in on Dark Kat's plot, but the Enforcers mistake them for the Dark SWAT Kats and are after them, too. They must stop the Dark SWAT Kats and figure out a way to get back to their own dimension.
25	12	"Unlikely Alloys"	Lance Falk	December 24, 1994
The Metallikats are up to their usual evil antics and try to rob the Megakat Dollar, but they encounter Commander Feral and the SWAT Kats. While fighting to escape, Mac loses his left arm and Molly is electrocuted and nearly terminated. After escaping, they see a news story on Dr. Lieter Greenbox (now voiced by Nick Chinlund) who has created a new piece of technology dubbed the "micro-brain repair unit" which analyzes the components and functions of any mechanical or electronic device and fixes them almost instantaneously. Mac goes to steal the device, which repairs himself and Molly flawlessly. However, the device becomes self aware after its programming is contaminated with the Metallikat's criminal personalities, and begins to assimilate anything mechanical and using them to make itself larger and more powerful, dubbing itself "Zed". After assimilating several Enforcer tanks and Mac, the device goes on a rampage through Megakat City, assimilating everything in sight. Teaming up with Molly and Dr. Greenbox, the SWAT Kats must stop Zed before it assimilates the high-tech weapons at Pumadyne and becomes unstoppable.
26	13	"(Kats Eye News) A Special Report"	Mickey Lawrence	January 6, 1995
A clip show featuring parts from the various SWAT Kats episodes listed above, it was intended to serve as a lead-in to Season 2, but did not actually air until the end of the series when it was released as TV special. It is compiled as a Kat's Eye News "documentary" about the SWAT Kats, which is hosted by character Ann Gora and consists entirely of re-edited excerpts from the series, using snippets from every first season episode, and from the first four episodes of the second season.

== Others ==
=== Unfinished episodes ===
These three episodes were in various stages of production at the time of the series' cancellation. They have never been aired and none of them were ever completely finished.

- "Succubus!": Also known as "The Curse of Kataluna". Commander Feral falls in love with a woman named Katrina Moorkroft, who is actually a succubus, and she begins to drain his lifeforce away. Elements of this episode were later recycled by writers Glenn Leopold and Davis Doi for a second-season episode, "Eclipse", of The Real Adventures of Jonny Quest, and later still for the direct-to-video movie Scooby-Doo on Zombie Island.
- "Turmoil II: The Revenge": Turmoil escapes from prison, and with the help of the women she liberated from jail, gains control of a laser device from her fortress, on top of a huge mountain. This episode would mark the return of Turmoil from Season 2's fifth episode, "Cry Turmoil".
- "Doctors of Doom": Dr. Harley Street (the alien-mutated scientist from "The Ci-Kat-A") resurfaces and teams up with Dr. Viper in creating havoc in Megakat City, including turning Callie into a giant cat-dragon hybrid. This episode was supposed to tell us about the fate of Dr. Harley Street who was supposedly killed in the first-season episode "The Ci-Kat-A".

=== Unproduced episodes ===
Four episodes were only in the very early concept stages at the time of the series' cancellation. They did not even enter the production or animation stage.

- "Cold War": According to Lance Falk, one of Hanna Barbera's writers, Rex Shard (who last appeared in "Chaos in Crystal") was supposed to return, now as a weather-controlling mutant warrior looking to freeze Megakat City after diving into an experimental energy source.
- "Blackout": According to Falk, this unused premise would feature a power failure that is just the start of the problems in Megakat City, especially when a new villain called Blackout threatens to destroy the city.
- "The Vampire She-Kat": Dr. Viper tests one of his mutagens on Lt. Felina that turns her into a vampire she kat. But Felina rebels against everyone, including Dr. Viper, and bites Callie Briggs, turning Callie into one as well. But The Swat Kats & Professor Konway are able to get her & Callie back to normal.
- "Blowout!": Dark Kat teams up with Dr. Viper and the Metallikats again in a bid to eliminate the SWAT Kats once and for all, even mutating Callie Briggs into a dragon-like monster. Intended as the season one finale, "Blowout!" was written by Lance Falk and never produced, although elements from it were originally used in Glenn Leopold's script for "Katastrophe".
