= SWAT Kats: The Radical Squadron =

1993 American animated TV series

- Season 2 title card
- Created by: Christian Tremblay; Yvon Tremblay
- Developed by: Glenn Leopold; Davis Doi
- Directed by: Robert Alvarez
- Voices of: Barry Gordon; Charlie Adler; Candi Milo; Gary Owens; Jim Cummings; Mark Hamill; Tress MacNeille; Lori Alan
- Composers: Matt Muhoberac; John Zuker; Randall Crissman; Nick Brown
- Country of origin: United States
- No. of seasons: 2
- No. of episodes: 26 (list of episodes)

Production
- Executive producer: Buzz Potamkin
- Producer: Davis Doi
- Running time: 22 minutes
- Production company: Hanna-Barbera Cartoons

Original release
- Network: TBS
- Release: September 11, 1993 – January 6, 1995

SWAT Kats: The Radical Squadron is an American animated television series created by Christian and Yvon Tremblay and produced by Hanna-Barbera. The series takes place in the fictional metropolis of Megakat City populated by anthropomorphic felines, known as "kats", and follows two vigilante pilots who possess a futuristic fighter jet with an array of weaponry. Throughout the series, they face various villains, as well as competition from Megakat City's militarized police force, called the Enforcers.

The series originally premiered and aired on the syndication block The Funtastic World of Hanna-Barbera, as well as on TBS Superstation (as a part of the Sunday Morning in Front of the TV block) from 1993 to 1995. Every episode of the series was directed by Robert Alvarez. The bulk of the series was written by Glenn Leopold (15 episodes) or Lance Falk (9 episodes). Jim Stenstrum contributed two episodes, while David Ehrman, Von Williams, Eric Clark (with Lance Falk), Mark Saraceni, and Jim Katz all contributed one episode each. Nine episodes from Season 1 are animated by Hanho Heung-Up Co., Ltd., four episodes from Season 1 and all episodes from Season 2 are animated by Mook Animation Inc.

A revival series, titled SWAT Kats: Revolution, is under development, with both the Tremblay brothers and the Toonz Media Group at the helm.

== Overview ==
Jake "Razor" Clawson (voiced by Barry Gordon) and Chance "T-Bone" Furlong (voiced by Charlie Adler) were members of Megakat City's paramilitary law enforcement agency known as the Enforcers. They were dishonorably discharged from the Enforcers after disobeying the orders of Commander Feral (voiced by Gary Owens), which resulted in the destruction of the newly built Enforcer Headquarters. While in pursuit of the criminal mastermind Dark Kat (voiced by Brock Peters), one of the main arch-villains of the series, the two rebelled against Enforcer Commander Feral's orders to fall back and leave Dark Kat to him, as Feral wanted the honor and fame of bringing Dark Kat in personally as the leader of the Enforcers. When they objected, citing their already-acquired target lock, Commander Feral crowded out their jet, clipping their wing and sending Jake and Chance's jet crashing into Enforcer Headquarters. The resultant explosion distracted Commander Feral, allowing Dark Kat's escape. The Commander took no responsibility for the incident and damage to his own agency's new HQ, discharged Jake and Chance from the Enforcers when they tried to argue over who was to blame, and reassigned them to work at the city's military salvage yard to pay for the damage to the Enforcer Headquarters which Feral caused.

Using discarded military parts and weapons from the salvage yard, Jake and Chance built themselves a three-engine jet fighter called the Turbokat, which resembled several different jet fighters, most notably the Grumman F-14 and the Saab Draken, along with a handful of other vehicles such as the Cyclotron (a motorcycle built into the jet's seating, deployed from the bomb bay of the Turbokat like a missile), the TurboMole (a subterranean vehicle used to drill underground), the HoverKat (a militarized hovercraft), and the Thunder Truck (a militarized Jeep modified from their tow truck). All these vehicles were stored, along with a training area and other equipment, in a secret hangar below the yard.

Razor and T-Bone now patrol Megakat City as the SWAT Kats, defending it against any kind of menace that threatens the city. Their enemies include Dark Kat, the undead sorcerer Pastmaster (voiced by Keene Curtis), the mutant mad scientist Doctor Viper (voiced by Frank Welker), and the robotic gangsters the Metallikats, husband and wife Mac and Molly Mange (voiced by Neil Ross and April Winchell). The SWAT Kats also face many villains-of-the-week, such as Rex Shard (voiced by John Vernon), Madkat (voiced by Roddy McDowall), Dr. Harley Street (voiced by Robert Ridgely), and Volcanus (vocal effects provided by Frank Welker).

The SWAT Kats keep their identities secret from everyone, including their closest ally Deputy Mayor Callie Briggs (voiced by Tress MacNeille), who assumes the responsibilities of both her post and of her boss, Mayor Manx (voiced by Jim Cummings), who mainly neglects his political duties in favor of pastimes like golf. Their methods do not endear them to Commander Feral, and the three of them often clash throughout the series.

In the second season, Feral's niece Felina (voiced by Lori Alan), who holds a lieutenant rank in the Enforcers, becomes another ally of the SWAT Kats.

== Episodes ==
Season	Episodes	Originally released	
Season	Episodes	First released	Last released
1	13	September 11, 1993	December 4, 1993
2	13	September 10, 1994	January 6, 1995

== Home media ==
In July 1995, Hanna-Barbera (through Turner Home Entertainment) released three VHS collections with two select episodes on each. These releases also included some of the "Secret Files of SWAT Kats" clips that ended each episode in original airings and an episode of Space Ghost at the beginning.

"Deadly Dr. Viper" – featuring "Destructive Nature" and "Katastrophe".

"Strike of Dark Kat" – featuring "The Wrath of Dark Kat" and "Night of Dark Kat".

"Metallikats Attack" – featuring "The Metallikats" and "Metal Urgency".

On December 14, 2010, the complete series was released on DVD via Warner Archive. The episodes themselves are not remastered, and the DVDs contain no extras or bonus features, although three scenes that were originally cut from the show were restored for the DVD. However, Warner Bros. put the end credits for the episodes in the wrong order, meaning voice actors either were not credited for episodes they were in, or were credited for ones where they did not appear. Only a few episodes had their proper end credits intact. On March 3, 2011, Warner Bros. removed SWAT Kats from its DVD page. On January 19, 2012, Warner Archive re-released the SWAT Kats set with the end credits corrected.

== Reception and cancellation ==
SWAT Kats became the number one syndicated animated show of 1994, according to Nielsen Television Index (NTI) and Nielsen Syndication Service (NSS). Toon Magazine documented the success of SWAT Kats in its Fall 1994 issue. Due to the program's success, Hanna-Barbera Productions planned to release new episodes, posters, and other works in 1995. However, the show was ultimately canceled with three unfinished episodes.

Ted Turner, CEO of Turner Broadcasting System which produced and aired the show, was reportedly displeased with the level of violence in his cartoons, leading to the delay of its merchandising and its eventual cancellation. Turner went on record in front of Congress and in an early 1995 interview after the show's cancellation, stated that "We have more cartoons than anybody: The Flintstones, The Jetsons, The Smurfs, Scooby-Doo. They're nonviolent. We don't have to worry that we're encouraging kids to kill each other - like some of the other cartoon programs do." According to the Tremblay Bros. in an interview, this quote was more directed against more adult-oriented TV shows at the time such as Beavis and Butt-Head, which depicted more realistic and easily copyable violence, compared to the more cartoony slapstick violence of the aforementioned shows. Both fans and Hanna-Barbera execs ultimately concluded this as still being a strict "anti-violence" policy, meant to undermine SWAT Kats, especially in the wake of Turner's own pet project show, Captain Planet and the Planeteers.

== Revival ==
On July 23, 2015, creators Christian and Yvon Tremblay announced a Kickstarter campaign to revive SWAT Kats, seeking to produce a new series, and if possible, a 70-minute film. On July 24, one day after the campaign began, the Kickstarter successfully reached its first funding goal of $50,000, needed for production of concept art and promotional material, which the pair had aimed to use to help them find an investor who would be interested in helping with the revival.

A more major goal of $200,000 would allow the pair to produce a 22-minute episode, while a pledge total of $1,000,000 would allow them to do a mini-series of five episodes. Their highest pledge, $1.5 million or more, would help them to make a SWAT Kats film. The campaign ended on August 22, 2015, with $141,500 pledged, and already passing another goal of $100,000 helped to create a 2-minute-long trailer of how the series would look.

On February 17, 2016, the Tremblay Brothers confirmed they had started development on the trailer, which they would show to a TV company in order to have the greenlight for production on SWAT Kats Revolution.

Christian Tremblay confirmed Warner Bros. had expressed interest in "bringing back" SWAT Kats on Boomerang, but were unable to convince the parent network to commit to a new series, and thus they passed on the project. Tremblay then started working with investors to create independent episodes of SWAT Kats that would be available online for streaming. In a Kickstarter campaign update on July 23, 2020, show co-creator Christian Tremblay alluded to the issues being faced in getting the SWAT Kats Revolution reboot picked up:

"It has been a long time coming to provide an update on Swat-Kats Revolution, we sincerely apologize. I hope this update will bring you comfort that the efforts to bring back SK is very much alive and we are actively pushing to make it happen...For us the challenge is not IF a new series will be produced, but WHEN will it be done...So we encountered roadblocks after roadblocks: Hulu passed, Netflix passed, Warner Bros passed. Amazon was not really the place for it and changed its animated content approach. A fairly important movie producer wanted to bring Swat-Kats to Netflix, where he has an output deal, but ultimately, the deal did not make sense for us. I can't count the number of potential business investors we met, trips we did, meetings we held. There have been many opportunities we believed were very promising (with some very important mini Major studios, among others), and we hold on to those opportunities to bring some good news, only to fall apart. Some additional difficulties were unexpected, such as the movie CATS! (Anthropomorphic cats), and a major box office disaster, ridiculed by everyone, let's just say that we had to let the dust clear on this one before we could even approach anyone in the industry, so they could not make any types of similarities between the two properties...this is a Hollywood mindset; when something bombs at the box office it becomes radioactive...We are more motivated than ever before. We have seen and encountered roadblocks in the past but we are resilient. It's not the 100's of NO that count, its the one Yes that allows everything to fall into place. We will make SK happen, no matter how hard or how long it takes.

=== Official revival announcement ===
In a Kickstarter campaign update on January 19, 2022, show co-creator Christian Tremblay announced that they "teamed up with Toonz Media Group to bring Swat-Kats Revolution to life." On February 1, 2022, several websites reported additional details, including that "the new series is billed as being for kids in the age range of 5-11" and that the series was already in pre-production as of that date. From artwork shared at Mumbai Comic Con 2025, the animation style was revealed to not be the 2D animation of the original, but a newer 3D animation style instead.

== In other media ==
=== Toys ===
Remco produced a line of action figures in 1994 which included Razor, T-Bone, Dark Kat and Dr. Viper. Both White Castle and Carl's Jr. have offered SWAT Kats toys in their kids' meals in the 1990s.

=== Video game ===
The game SWAT Kats: The Radical Squadron, developed by AIM, was released by Hudson Soft on August 21, 1995, in North America for the Super NES. A Sega Mega Drive game based on SWAT Kats was in development by Traveller's Tales but it was cancelled before being completed.

=== Comics ===
On July 25, 2025, it was announced that a SWAT Kats comic book series would be published by Roditeli Productions. A Kickstarter for the comic was launched on October 28, 2025, and it reached its main goal of $40,000 within the same day. The funding period ended November 29, 2025 and raised over $730,000, becoming the largest single-issue comic book Kickstarter ever.

== See also ==
- Road Rovers
