= Stand By (Roman Holliday song) =

Single by Roman Holliday

from the album Cookin' on the Roof
- Released: 1983
- Length: 2:44
- Label: Jive
- Songwriters: Steve Lambert, Rob Lambert
- Producer: Peter Collins

"Stand By" is the debut single by British band Roman Holliday, released in 1983. It was written by Steve Lambert and Rob Lambert and produced by Peter Collins. The song peaked at #61 on the UK Singles Chart. In the US, "Stand By" peaked at #54.

== Charts ==
Chart (1983)	Peak position
Australia (Kent Music Report)	71
UK Singles (Official Charts Company)	61
US Billboard Hot 100	54
