= The Adventures of Don Coyote and Sancho Panda =

1990 animated television series

- Genre: Adventure; Comedy
- Written by: Cliff Roberts; Sam Graham; Gary Greenfield; Chris Hubbell
- Directed by: Robert Alvarez; Don Lusk; Jay Sarbry; Paul Sommer; Carl Urbano
- Voices of: Frank Welker; Don Messick; Brad Garrett
- Narrated by: Héctor Elizondo (intro)
- Composers: Clark Gassman; Michael Tavera
- Countries of origin: United States; Italy
- Original languages: English; Italian
- No. of seasons: 2
- No. of episodes: 26

Production
- Executive producers: William Hanna; Joseph Barbera; Paul Sabella
- Producer: Kay Wright
- Editor: Gil Iverson
- Running time: 30 minutes
- Production companies: Hanna-Barbera Productions; RAI - Radiotelevisione Italiana

Original release
- Network: Syndicated (United States); RAIUNO (Italy)
- Release: September 16, 1990 – December 8, 1991

The Adventures of Don Coyote and Sancho Panda is a 1990 animated television series produced by Hanna-Barbera with the Italian public service broadcaster RAI. The series is loosely based on the characters Don Quixote and Sancho Panza from the 17th century novel by Cervantes.

== Plot ==
Don Coyote (voiced by Frank Welker) is a swordsman who travels the land in search of adventure, with the help of his noble horse Rosinante (voiced by Brad Garrett), Sancho Panda (voiced by Don Messick) and his cynical donkey, Dapple (voiced by Frank Welker). These crusaders of chivalry ride the countryside fighting for truth, justice, and beauty. Their attempts to do so are complicated by Don Coyote's state of mental unbalance and constantly mistaking everyday objects for horrific monsters. Coyote is always successful, for accidental reasons.

== Broadcast ==
The Adventures of Don Coyote and Sancho Panda first aired in 1989 in Europe, and then in the United States in 1990 as part of the weekend/weekday morning programming block The Funtastic World of Hanna-Barbera.

== Episodes ==
=== Season 1: 1990 ===
No. overall	No. in season	Title	Written by	Original release date
1	1	"Pity the Poor Pirate"	Sam Graham, Chris Hubbell	September 16, 1990
Don runs into the pirate captain Jack Boutique and incessantly chases him due to mistaking Jack for a damsel in distress.
2	2	"Not a Ghost of a Chance"	Gary Greenfield	September 23, 1990
Don and Sancho enter a ghost town where the smuggler Dusty tries effortlessly to drive Don away so he can get his gold stash.
3	3	"The Horse Who Would Be King"	Cliff Roberts	September 30, 1990
4	4	"Veni Vidi Viking"	Cliff Roberts	October 7, 1990
Jacques Boutique disguises himself as a maiden in distress in order to capture a ship. Don Coyote mistakes him for a real lady whom he must rescue. His chivalrous acts cause Jacques to go insane.
5	5	"Don Coyote Meets Robin Hood"	Cliff Roberts	October 14, 1990
While holidaying in England. Don Coyote meets Robin Hood and does his duty as a knight by arresting him as a robber. After he finds out the local authorities like Prince John and the Sheriff of Nottingham are corrupt from Maid Marian, Don must rescue Robin as well as different members of the Merry Men.
6	6	"Rosinante by a Nose"	Eric Alter	October 21, 1990
Rosinate is abducted by a group of cavemen who want to fatten him up for a sacrifice. Don Coyote and Sancho arrive just in time to rescue him from a horse-eating tyrannosaurus.
7	7	"The Reluctant Brides"	Gary Greenfield	October 28, 1990
Don Coyote angers a troupe of actors when he keeps disrupting rehearsals to "save" the fair maiden actress, but the leading man and stunt man are really thieves and only Rosinate and Dapple know the truth. With their help, Don Coyote blunders his way to the rescue.
8	8	"Surely You Joust"	Chris Hubbell, Sam Graham	November 4, 1990
After finding out that Robin Hood and his band of merry Men steal, Don Coyote turns them over to the Sheriff of Nottingham. He later rescues them when he discovers that they have an important role to play in the wedding of Maid Marion.
9	9	"Double Don"	Cliff Roberts	November 11, 1990
A thief intending to steal the royal treasury poses as Don in order to get the real Don framed.
10	10	"Don Coyote & the Flying Gargoyle"	Cliff Roberts	November 18, 1990
11	11	"Don Coyote and the Masked Avenger"	Sam Graham, Chris Hubbell	November 25, 1990
12	12	"Shrink, Shrank, Shrunk"	Fred Kron	December 2, 1990
An evil wizard plots to use Don and Sancho for his shrinking experiments. The duo later meet a princess and discover the wizard has threatened to shrink her whole kingdom's population if she does not marry him.
13	13	"Who's Got the Genie"	Gary Greenfield	December 9, 1990

=== Season 2: 1991 ===
No. overall	No. in season	Title	Written by	Original release date
14	1	"Sancho's Island"	Gary Greenfield	September 15, 1991
Sancho gets his own private island.
15	2	"Vincente the Inventor"	Cliff Roberts	September 22, 1991
Vincente, an inventor hoping to become royal inventor, has problems preventing Don from using some of his gadgets.
16	3	"Sir Sancho the Nearly Knight"	Gary Greenfield	September 29, 1991
17	4	"Don't Monkey with the Baby"	Barry Blitzer	October 6, 1991
18	5	"Don Coyote & the Contessa"	Chris Hubbell, Sam Graham	October 13, 1991
The Contessa elopes with her boyfriend San Diego to escape her father, but gets kidnapped by a bandit named El Diablo. Don, however, keeps mistakenly believing Diego is El Diablo.
19	6	"Don Coyote & the Deep Sea"	Chris Hubbell, Sam Graham	October 20, 1991
20	7	"A Knight in Arabia"	Fred Kron	October 27, 1991
21	8	"Goodbye Rosinante"	Cliff Roberts	November 1991
22	9	"Don Coyote's Fire-Breathing Friend"	Cliff Roberts	November 10, 1991
A dragon forced to perform as a giant money-making carnival game escapes from Grabbo and his henchman (those who captured him), and Don ends up befriending him and escorting him back to his home while having to deal with the two greedy robbers.
23	10	"The Haunted Inheritance"	Chris Hubbell, Sam Graham	November 17, 1991
24	11	"Don Coyote & the Feudin' Families"	Cliff Roberts	November 24, 1991
25	12	"Don Coyote & the Christmas Bell"	Arthur Alsberg, Don Nelson	December 1, 1991
26	13	"Don Coyote & the Secret Weapon"	Cliff Roberts, Gary Greenfield	December 8, 1991
