= Freddy Monnickendam =

Belgian businessman

Freddy Monnickendam is a Belgian businessman and executive producer of the animated television series The Smurfs (1981), Snorks (1984), and Foofur (1986).

== Biography ==
Freddy Monnickendam came into contact with comics when he negotiated the rights to The Smurfs for Father Abraham. Afterwards, he became the head of SEPP International S.A. (SEPP stands for "La Société d'Édition, de Presse et de Publicité"), the company branch of Dupuis (the editor of The Smurfs) that was responsible for the merchandising of the comic heroes. He negotiated the contract between Dupuis, Peyo, NBC and Hanna-Barbera, for the creation of a series of Smurf cartoons, and became the first executive producer of the series. Peyo wanted the Smurf cartoons to be as faithful as possible he had created in his comics, but Monnickendam preferred to make the cartoons more accessible and mainstream. This led to the fast deterioration of relations between the two men, ending in court cases about the division of the rights and the money involved. Annoyed by these discussions and problems, he decided to start a new series of cartoons called Snorks, which were created and designed by Nicolas Broca. Monnickendam later acquired all the rights, hoping to equal the success of The Smurfs, but the success of the Snorks was limited and the series soon ended production. Having bypassed Dupuis, the collaboration between the publisher and Monnickendam ended, and as a result, SEPP International S.A. was disbanded. Monnickendam continued to work with Hanna-Barbera on such shows as Foofur (created by Phil Mendez), The Completely Mental Misadventures of Ed Grimley (based on the Martin Short character), and other shows (including Tom and Jerry Kids), but he was never able to replicate the success he had with The Smurfs.

== Filmography ==
- The Smurfs (1981–1987)
- Snorks (1984–1989)
- Seabert (1985–1986)
- Foofur (1986–1988)
- CBS Schoolbreak Special (1987–1988: Season 5 episode entitled "Home Sweet Homeless")
- The Completely Mental Misadventures of Ed Grimley (1988)

Note: Due to the disbandment of his company SEPP International S.A., the last two seasons of The Smurfs, from 1988 to 1990, were produced by Hanna-Barbera but with the new Belgian company Lafig S.A.
