= Roman Holliday =

UK musical group

- Origin: England
- Genres: Pop, swing, new wave
- Years active: 1980–1985
- Label: Jive Records
- Past members: Steve Lambert; Brian Bonhomme; Simon Cohen; Adrian York; Jon Durno; John Eacott; Rob Lambert
- Website: romanholliday.co.uk

Roman Holliday were a British band active in the 1980s. They are best known in the UK for their hit single "Don't Try to Stop It", which reached number 14 on the UK Singles Chart in the summer of 1983. A follow-up, "Motormania", peaked at number 40.

== Career ==
The band was established in November 1980 by Brian Bonhomme, Steve Lambert, Simon Cohen and Peter Noone (the latter of whom left shortly after the band's formation). Later on, Rob Lambert and Jon Durno joined, followed by Soho Square busker, John Eacott. At the end of 1982, Adrian York joined the band as a piano player. Tony Wallman was in the band briefly (before the band became successful). After John Peel saw the band at the Jive Dive swing club in London, they recorded two sessions for his show. Mick Jones, then of the Clash, also saw them and invited them to support his band, which led to a signing to Jive Records. "Don't Try to Stop It" was their second single for Jive and became a hit in summer 1983. The follow-up, "Motormania" failed to achieve the same success and the parent album Cookin' on the Roof, released in late 1983, achieved only modest success. Nevertheless, Roman Holliday toured England and America, opening for Missing Persons, Culture Club, and Stray Cats. In 1984, both brass men, Rob Lambert and John Eacott left the band.

In the United States, the group achieved exposure through MTV, which aired their "Stand By" video. The single went to number one on the Canadian Adult Contemporary chart in November 1983. Roman Holliday also charted in Japan on the international, as well as the domestic market, with "Hear It in the Night" and the Robert John "Mutt" Lange written and produced track, "One Foot Back in Your Door". Both singles went top 10.

Bonhomme is currently employed at Youngstown State University. He is a professor of Russian history, and teaches a number of courses in modern European history and environmental history.

The group reformed for a one-off show in London on 9 October 2026 featuring Durno, York and Cohen.

== Band members ==
Roman Holliday was mainly composed of:

- Steve Lambert, born 14 March 1962 (age 64) in Mile End, London – singer
- Brian Bonhomme, born 30 September 1962 (age 64) in Harlow, Essex – guitar / vocals
- Simon Cohen, born 11 January 1963 (age 63) in Kings Cross, London — drums
- Adrian York, born 11 July 1961 (age 65) in Chiswick, London – piano
- Jon Durno, born 4 March 1962 (age 64) in Ilford, London — bass
- John Eacott, born 19 December 1961 (age 64) in Reading, Berkshire — trumpet
- Rob Lambert, born 22 February 1963 (age 63) in Epping, Essex — saxophone

== Discography ==
=== Albums ===
- Roman Holliday (1983) Jive / Arista / Sony / BMG – U.S. No. 142
- Cookin' on the Roof (1983) Jive / Arista / Sony / BMG – UK No. 31; U.S. No. 116
- Fire Me Up (1984) Jive / Arista / Sony / BMG – U.S. No. 201

=== Singles ===
- "Stand By" (1983) - UK No. 61; AUS No. 71; U.S. No. 54; U.S. CB No. 57
- "Don't Try to Stop It" (1983) - UK No. 14; U.S. No. 68; U.S. CB No. 66
- "Motormania" (1983) - UK No. 40
- "One Foot Back in Your Door" (12")
- "Fire Me Up" (1984)
- "Touch Too Much" (1984)
- "One Foot Back in Your Door" (1985) - U.S. No. 76

=== Japanese albums ===
- ローマの休日/Cookin' on the Roof (CBS Sony)
- 涙のラストクルーズ/Fire Me Up (CBS Sony)
- ティーチャーズ/TEACHERS – original soundtrack from the Aaron Russo produced motion picture One Foot Back in Your Door

=== Japanese singles ===
- "スタンバイ/Stand By"
- "俺らはハリキリボーイ/Don't Try to Stop It"
- "恋のモーターマニア/Motormania"
- "涙のラストクルーズ/Hear It in the Night"
- "ワン•フット•バック/One Foot Back in Your Door"

=== DVD and LaserDisk ===
- Live in Tokyo (1985) <厚生年金大ホール/Koseinenkin Big Hall>
