= Snorks =

Animated television series produced by Hanna-Barbera

- Title card
- Genre: Comedy; Adventure; Fantasy
- Created by: Nic Broca
- Directed by: Carl Urbano (season 1); Rudy Zamora (season 2); Alan Zaslove (season 2); Oscar Dufau (seasons 2–3); Don Lusk (seasons 2–4); Art Davis (season 3); Charlie Downs (season 3); John Kimball (season 3); Bob Goe (seasons 3–4); Paul Sommer (seasons 3–4)
- Voices of: Michael Bell; Brian Cummings; B. J. Ward; Nancy Cartwright; Barry Gordon; Frank Welker; Rob Paulsen
- Theme music composer: Ferry Wienneke (season 1, worldwide version); Hoyt Curtin (seasons 1–2, U.S. version); Chase/Rucker Productions (seasons 3–4, U.S./worldwide versions)
- Opening theme: "Snorks" (season 1, worldwide); "Let's Snork a Happy Song" (seasons 1, U.S.); "We're the Snorks" (season 2, U.S.); "Take a Diving Snork Along" (season 1-2, U.K.); "Come Along with the Snorks" (seasons 3–4, worldwide)
- Ending theme: "Snorks" (instrumental); "Let's Snork a Happy Song" (instrumental); "We're the Snorks" (instrumental); "Take a Diving Snork Along" (instrumental); "Come Along with the Snorks" (instrumental)
- Composer: Hoyt Curtin
- Countries of origin: United States; Belgium
- Original language: English
- No. of seasons: 4
- No. of episodes: 65 (108 segments + pilot episode) (list of episodes)

Production
- Executive producers: William Hanna; Joseph Barbera; Freddy Monnickendam
- Producers: Gerard Baldwin (season 1); Bernard Wolf (seasons 2–3); Kay Wright (season 4)
- Editors: Gil Iverson; Robert Ciaglia (season 3)
- Running time: 12 minutes; 24 minutes (later episodes)
- Production companies: Hanna-Barbera Productions; SEPP International S.A.

Original release
- Network: NBC (seasons 1–2); Syndication (seasons 3–4)
- Release: September 15, 1984 – March 15, 1989

Snorks is an animated fantasy children's TV series created by Nic Broca and produced by Hanna-Barbera Productions alongside SEPP International S.A. in collaboration with 3M France. It ran for a total of four seasons, consisting of a pilot episode and 65 episodes (108 segments), on NBC in the U.S. from September 15, 1984, to March 15, 1989. The program continued to be available in syndication from 1987 to 1989 as part of The Funtastic World of Hanna-Barbera's third season.

== Origins ==
=== Early years (1977–1981) ===
In 1977, Freddy Monnickendam, a Belgian businessman and artist, first made contact with the comics industry when he negotiated the rights for the Smurfs comics to Father Abraham. He later became the head of SEPP, a branch of Dupuis, as an editor responsible for the merchandising of the Smurfs' comic series. Then he negotiated the contract between Peyo, NBC and Hanna-Barbera for the creation of a new Smurfs cartoon series; Peyo wanted the show to be as faithful as possible to his original comics, but Monnickendam wanted it to be more mainstream and accessible. These negotiations would later result in a legal dispute between the two people due to the division of the rights and the money involved. As a final result, Monnickendam decided to compete with the Smurfs' success, starting a new series of cartoons. It has since been speculated by some critics that the Snorks exist within the same canonical universe as the Smurfs.

=== Development, concept and first comic book (1981–1984) ===
In June 1981, Nic Broca created the earlier character designs that were made for "Diskies", a very early iteration, made for the comic series Spirou & Fantasio. While initially created as robot characters, they were developed into minute sea animals, and with funding from Persil's Belgian branch, the very first Snorks comic book was published in January 1982 by Broca himself. Freddy Monnickendam, after battling with fellow Belgian cartoonist Peyo in court, searched for a series that could battle the success of The Smurfs, as he tried and failed to buy its rights since 1977. He acquired the Snorks' rights from Nic Broca, and both began a partnership with Hanna-Barbera for the production of this new animated series. After that, a three-minute Snorks pilot episode was then made for the TV network NBC, although it has not been seen by the public.

=== Premiere as animated TV series (1984–1989) ===
Snorks premiered on September 15, 1984, and ended on May 13, 1989. It aired for five years. Unlike Freddy Monnickendam had hoped, he was unable to take the Snorks' success to the same heights as The Smurfs, which resulted on the end of his partnership with Broca. Although the Snorks' success was limited, the animated TV show gained fans worldwide, making appearances in popular culture and gaining several product lines.

== Synopsis ==
The Snorks are a tribe of small, colorful anthropomorphic sea creatures that live in the fictional Mediterranean undersea realm of Snorkland. They have snorkels on their heads, which are used to propel them quickly through the water.

== Voice cast ==
=== Main ===
- Michael Bell - Allstar Seaworthy, Bigweed, Council of Elders
- Nancy Cartwright - Daffney Gillfin
- Brian Cummings - Dimitris "Dimmy" Finster
- Barry Gordon - Wellington Wetworth, Jr. "Junior"
- Rob Paulsen - Corky
- B. J. Ward - Casey Kelp, Lil' Seaweed
- Frank Welker - Tooter Shelby, Occy, Grandpa Wetworth, Finneus, The Great Snork Nork

=== Recurring ===
- Peter Cullen - Council of Elders
- Roger DeWitt - JoJo
- Joan Gardner - Mrs. Wetworth
- Joan Gerber - Mrs. Kelp
- Bob Holt - Mr. Seaworthy (Seasons 1-2)
- Zale Kessler - Dr. Strangesnork
- Gail Matthius - Smallstar Seaworthy
- Mitzi McCall - Auntie Marina, Matilda
- Edie McClurg - Mrs. Seaworthy, Ms. Seabottom
- Frank Nelson - Governor Wellington Wetworth (Seasons 1-2)
- Alan Oppenheimer - Governor Wellington Wetworth (Seasons 3-4), Mr. Seaworthy (Seasons 3-4)
- Clive Revill - Dr. Galeo Seaworthy
- Robert Ridgely - Mr. Kelp
- Fredricka Weber - Willie Wetworth

=== Additional voices ===
- Patricia Alice Albrecht (Season 3)
- Jack Angel (Season 2)
- René Auberjonois (Seasons 3-4)
- Chub Bailly (Season 3)
- Roger C. Carmel (Season 2)
- Maryann Chinn (Season 2)
- Cam Clarke (Seasons 2-3)
- Selette Cole (Season 2)
- Townsend Coleman (Season 2)
- Jim Cummings (Season 3)
- Jennifer Darling (Season 2)
- Jerry Dexter (Season 3)
- Jeff Doucette (Season 3)
- Marshall Efron (Season 3)
- Richard Erdman (Seasons 2-3)
- Laurie Faso (Season 3)
- Miriam Flynn (Season 2)
- Kathleen Freeman (Season 2)
- Pam Hayden (Season 2)
- Arte Johnson (Season 3)
- Stan Jones (Season 2)
- Paul Kirby (Season 1)
- Marilyn Lightstone (Season 2)
- Shane McCabe (Season 2)
- Chuck McCann (Season 2)
- Diane Michelle (Season 2)
- Howard Morris (Season 2)
- Laurel Page (Season 3)
- Hal Rayle (Season 2)
- Peter Renaday (Season 2)
- Roger Rose (Season 2)
- Joe Ruskin (Season 3)
- Michael Rye (Season 2)
- Ken Sansom (Season 2)
- Ronnie Schell (Season 2)
- Howard Stevens (Season 2)
- Rip Taylor (Season 3)
- Jean Vander Pyl (Season 2)

== Episodes ==
Season	Episodes	Originally released	
Season	Episodes	First released	Last released
Pilot		1982	
1	13	September 15, 1984	December 15, 1984
2	10	September 14, 1985	December 21, 1985
3	13	September 12, 1987	December 15, 1987
4	29	September 12, 1988	March 15, 1989

== Broadcast and home media ==
Snorks ran for a total of four seasons, consisting of a pilot episode and 65 episodes (108 segments), on NBC in the U.S. from September 15, 1984, to March 15, 1989. The program continued to be available in syndication from 1987 to 1989 as part of The Funtastic World of Hanna-Barbera's third season.

In the 1990s, it aired on both USA Network and Cartoon Network in the U.S.

From 2000 until 2014, it also aired on CN's spin-off channel Boomerang.

In some countries around Europe, it aired on ITV, RTL, MTV3, TF1, Italia 1, VARA, and Cartoon Network Scandinavia.

Warner Bros. Home Entertainment's vintage DVD video line Warner Archive released Snorks: The Complete First Season on DVD in Region 1 on September 25, 2012 as part of their Hanna-Barbera Classic Collection label. The release is available exclusively through Warner's online store and Amazon.com. In addition, 39 episodes have been released on Hulu per a distribution agreement with Content Media Corporation. Warner Archive released Snorks: The Complete Second Season on DVD in region 1 on July 7, 2015, and later Snorks: The Complete Third and Fourth Seasons on December 6, 2016.

DVD name	Ep #	Release date
The Complete First Season	13	September 25, 2012
The Complete Second Season	10	July 7, 2015
The Complete Third and Fourth Seasons	42	December 6, 2016

As of 2025, it never streamed on HBO Max because of rights issues with SEPP (now known as Dodo Reanimation Lab).

== See also ==
- List of works produced by Hanna-Barbera
- List of Hanna-Barbera characters
