= Foofur =

American traditionally animated children's television series

- Foofur and his group
- Genre: Comedy; Slice of life
- Created by: Phil Mendez
- Directed by: Art Davis (season 1); Don Lusk (season 1); Carl Urbano (season 1); Rudy Zamora (season 1); Oscar Dufau (season 2); Bob Goe (season 2); John Kimball (season 2); Paul Sommer (season 2)
- Voices of: Michael Bell; Pat Carroll; Peter Cullen; David Doyle; Dick Gautier; Christina Lange; Allan Melvin; Don Messick; Jonathan Schmock; Susan Silo; Susan Tolsky; Chick Vennera; Frank Welker; Eugene Williams
- Theme music composer: Hoyt Curtin
- Opening theme: "Foofur"
- Ending theme: "Foofur" (instrumental)
- Composer: Hoyt Curtin
- Country of origin: United States
- Original language: English
- No. of seasons: 2
- No. of episodes: 26 (46 segments)

Production
- Executive producers: William Hanna; Joseph Barbera; Freddy Monnickendam
- Producers: Kay Wright (season 1); Paul Sabella (season 2)
- Editor: Gil Iverson
- Running time: 30 minutes
- Production companies: Hanna-Barbera Productions; SEPP International S.A.

Original release
- Network: NBC
- Release: September 13, 1986 – December 5, 1987

Foofur is an American animated children's television series from Kissyfur and later Monster Mania creator Phil Mendez that was produced by Hanna-Barbera Productions with SEPP International S.A. Airing on NBC from 1986 to 1987, the show was about the everyday misadventures of the skinny blue protagonist dog in Willowby. A comic book series based on the cartoon was produced by and released from Star Comics (an imprint of Marvel Comics).

== Plot ==
In the town of Willowby, a tall skinny blue bloodhound named Foofur has taken refuge in a mansion, in 32 Maple Street, which is also his birthplace. In Foofur's group is his niece Rocki, Fencer the Cat, a bulldog named Louis with his girlfriend, an Old English Sheepdog named Annabell, and a Cocker Spaniel named Hazel with her husband, a Miniature Schnauzer named Fritz-Carlos.

Foofur and his friends, however, have an enemy in a woman named Mrs. Amelia Escrow and her pet Chihuahua named Pepe, who tries to expose Foofur's illegal roommates, but always to no avail. Mrs. Escrow has tried many times to sell the estate, but unbeknownst to her, Foofur and his friends keep the house from being bought, as they also protect their home from rodents like the Rat Brothers who tend to mess with Fencer, other cats like Vinnie and his Cat Pack, and greedy humans.

While trying to stop Mrs. Escrow, Foofur tries to avoid having his friends captured by the Bowser Busters' dog catchers Mel and Harvey. In addition, an Afghan Hound named Burt also antagonizes Foofur and competes with him to win the affection of a basset hound named Dolly.

== Characters ==
=== Main characters ===
- Foofur (voiced by Frank Welker) is a blue bloodhound who has taken refuge in a mansion, at 32 Maple Street, which is also his birthplace.
- Rocki (voiced by Christina Lange) is an indigo bloodhound puppy and Foofur's niece.
- Louis (voiced by Dick Gautier) is a street-smart bulldog.
- Annabell (voiced by Susan Tolsky) is a sensitive Old English Sheepdog and Louis' girlfriend.
- Hazel (voiced by Pat Carroll) is a Cocker Spaniel and Fritz-Carlos' wife.
- Fritz-Carlos (voiced by Jonathan Schmock) is a Miniature Schnauzer and Hazel's husband.
- Fencer (voiced by Eugene Williams) is a cat with a penchant for the martial arts.
- Mrs. Amelia Escrow (voiced by Susan Silo) is a woman who has tried many times to sell the mansion. Unbeknownst to her, Foofur and his friends keep the house from being bought.
- Pepe (voiced by Don Messick) is Mrs. Amelia Escrow's chihuahua who tries to expose Foofur and his roommates, to no avail.
- Rat Brothers are three rats who antagonize Fencer.
  - Sammy (voiced by Chick Vennera) is a thin black rat who is the leader of the Rat Brothers.
  - Baby (voiced by Peter Cullen) is a fat violet rat.
  - Chucky (voiced by Allan Melvin in most episodes, and by Frank Welker in a few episodes) is a fat pink rat who is the strongest of the Rat Brothers.
- Mel and Harvey (voiced by David Doyle and Michael Bell) are the Bowser Busters dog catchers.
- Vinnie (voiced by Peter Cullen) is the leader of a cat gang and one of the enemies of Foofur and his friends.
- Burt (voiced by William Callaway) is an arrogant Afghan Hound who tries to win Dolly's love.
- Dolly (voiced by Susan Blu) is a Basset Hound who is the object of Foofur and Burt's affections.

=== Other characters ===
- Norris is a beagle puppy who is also a mascot for a dog food company.
- Bertie and Bernie are two beagles belonging to a judge.
- Harry is an easily-scared dog.
- Pam is a Pekingese.
- Celia is a poodle.
- Brenda is a terrier.
- Brigette is a poodle who belongs to Mrs. Escrow's cousin Roberto.
- Lucy is a poodle who lives in a pawn shop.
- Muffy is a poodle.
- Jojo is a Scottish Terrier.
- Sarge is a Doberman Pinscher.
- Dobkins is a St. Bernard.
- Trendy is a Siberian Husky.
- Blaze is a German Shepherd.
- Lorenzo is a dalmatian.
- Otto is a Labrador Retriever.
- Rover Cleveland is an elderly dog.
- Tugboat is Foofur's brother and Rocki's father.
- Phyllis is Foofur's sister.
- Obscura is a cat belonging to a fortune teller.
- Cleo is a violet cat belonging to an archaeologist.
- Willy is a fox kit, who tries to avoid the fox hunters.
- Duke is a singing mouse.
- Killer (voiced by Jerry Houser) is a harmless St. Bernard.
- Brisbane is a dog.
- Big Boombah is a rat and the leader of the Shipyard Rats who is an opportunist.
- Pops is a rat who lives in the Willowby Train Station.
- Buttercup is Mrs. Escrow's pet canary.
- Mr. Mutton is a smuggler from London.
- Kirk is Hazel's old boyfriend, a German Shepherd trained for fire rescues who saves Fritz-Carlos and Rocki's playmate Augie when they're trapped in a burning house.
- Augie is another local dog, Rocki's playmate.
- Ivan is a Russian dog Foofur and Louis interact with in New York City.
- Lulubelle is a female dog initially intended to smuggle jewels, who was replaced by Annabelle.
- Oliver is an English puppy whom Annabelle saves after she ends up in London.

== Voice cast ==
- Frank Welker – Foofur, Chucky (in some episodes)
- Michael Bell – Harvey
- Susan Blu – Dolly
- William Callaway – Burt
- Pat Carroll – Hazel
- Peter Cullen – Baby, Vinnie
- David Doyle – Mel
- Dick Gautier – Louis
- Christina Lange – Rocki
- Allan Melvin – Chucky
- Don Messick – Pepe
- Jonathan Schmock – Fritz Carlos
- Susan Silo – Mrs. Escrow
- Susan Tolsky – Annabell
- Chick Vennera – Sam
- Eugene Williams – Fencer

=== Additional voices ===
- David Ackroyd (Season 2)
- Jered Barclay (Season 1)
- Roscoe Lee Browne (Season 2)
- Arthur Burghardt (Season 1)
- Hamilton Camp
- Victoria Carroll (Season 1)
- Cheryl Chase (Season 2)
- Danny Cooksey (Season 1) - Bogey (in "The Last Resort")
- Jim Cummings (Season 2)
- Linda Dangcil (Season 1)
- Jennifer Darling
- Leo DeLyon (Season 2)
- Walker Edmiston (Season 2)
- Casey Ellison (Season 1)
- John Erwin (Season 1)
- Miriam Flynn
- June Foray (Season 1)
- George Furth (Season 2)
- Melanie Gaffin (Season 1)
- Henry Gibson (Season 2)
- Scott Grimes (Season 2)
- Edan Gross (Season 2)
- Jonathan Harris – Lance Lyons
- Phil Hartman (Season 2)
- Jerry Houser (Season 2) – Killer the St. Bernard (in "Pepe's Pet Peeve")
- Vincent Howard (Season 2)
- Arte Johnson (Season 1)
- Aron Kincaid (Season 2)
- Keland Love (Season 1)
- Allan Lurie (Season 2)
- Jim MacGeorge (Season 2)
- Robert Mandan (Season 2)
- Kenneth Mars (Season 1)
- Terrence McGovern (Season 2)
- Brian Stokes Mitchell (Season 2)
- Pedro Montero (Season 1)
- Lynne Moody
- Pat Musick (Season 2)
- Frank Nelson (Season 1) – Dr. Pavlov (in "A Little Off the Top")
- Louis Nye (Season 2)
- Nicholas Omana (Season 1)
- Rob Paulsen (Season 2)
- Josh Rodine (Season 1)
- Percy Rodrigues (Season 2)
- Kath Soucie (Season 2, uncredited)
- Alexandra Stoddart (Season 2)
- Larry Storch (Season 2)
- Mark L. Taylor (Season 1)
- Sal Viscuso (Season 2)
- B.J. Ward (Season 2)
- Lennie Weinrib (Season 2)

== Episode list ==
=== Season 1 (1986) ===
No.	Title	Written by	Original release date
1a	"A Little Off the Top"	S : Mark Young; T : Tony Marino	September 13, 1986
The gang try to help Fritz get over losing his hair, but the situation gets worse when part of his mustache is accidentally shaved off.
1b	"A Clean Sweep"	S : Mark Young; T : Mark Cassutt	September 13, 1986
Hazel forces the gang to clean the house, but then the dogcatchers come to clean the mansion for Mrs. Escrow.
2	"Moving Experience"	T : Mark Young; S/T : Jim Ryan	September 20, 1986
Foofur and the others try to help a dog named Irma who is about to give birth to puppies.
3	"Dogstyles of the Rich & Famous"	T : Mark Young; S/T : Jack Enyart	September 27, 1986
When Mrs. Escrow rests in the gang's house while her house's paint dries, the gang comes to a fancy mansion as a burglary is about to take place.
4	"Foofur Falls in Love"	Susan Misty Stewart and Joseph Taggart	October 4, 1986
Foofur goes head over heels for a girl dog named Dolly.
5a	"The Last Resort"	S : Mark Young; T : Richard Merwin	October 11, 1986
Rocki becomes friends with a pup who ran away from an obedience school.
5b	"Thicker Than Water"	S : Mark Young; T : Reed Robbins	October 11, 1986
Chaos ensues when Foofur tries to give a gold collar to Dolly and at the same time, try to help Fencer by donating blood.
6a	"Hot Over the Collar"	S : Mark Young; T : Mark Edens	October 18, 1986
Foofur uses a hatband as a makeshift collar for Rocki, and she comes to a dog show, not knowing it is a trap set by Mel and Harvey.
6b	"A-Job Hunting We Will Go"	S : Mark Young; T : Tony Marino	October 18, 1986
Pepe has the gang work odd jobs to raise $100 to pay Mrs. Escrow's house tax or the gang will be out on the streets.
7a	"A Royal Pain"	Mark Cassutt	October 25, 1986
Fencer helps a group of cats after the owner's sister evicts them from the house.
7b	"Nothing to Sneeze At"	S : Mark Young; T : David Schwartz	October 25, 1986
Fencer gets a cold after Foofur and the others bathe him.
8a	"Country Club Chaos"	S : Mark Young; T : Reed Robbins	November 1, 1986
Foofur, Rocki, Fencer, and Dolly try to save a fox cub's life from a group of fox hunters at a country club.
8b	"You Dirty Rat"	Paul Pumpian and Franelle Silver	November 1, 1986
After accidentally putting Rocki in danger, the Rat Brothers are thrown out of the house by Foofur and they turn to a shipyard rat named Boombah for help.
9a	"This Little Piggy's on TV"	S : Mark Young and Reed Robbins; T : Christina Adams	November 8, 1986
The gang try to help a pig reunite with his girlfriend, who broke into show business.
9b	"Fencer's Freaky Friday"	S : Mark Young; S/T : Reed Robbins	November 8, 1986
It is Friday the 13th, Fencer is treated like bad luck and a pair of superstitious twins are in search of a treasure.
10a	"Legal Beagles"	Reed Robbins	November 15, 1986
Foofur's house is under threat when a con artist's dog fakes an injury and the con artist sues Mrs. Escrow.
10b	"Bon Voyage Rocki"	S : Mark Young; T : Don Glut; S/T : Reed Robbins	November 15, 1986
Just as Rocki is visited by her father Tugboat just before her birthday, she is faced by a bully and she has to choose between staying with her uncle Foofur or go with her father to sea.
11a	"Russian Through New York"	S : Mark Young and Reed Robbins; T : John Bonaccorsi	November 22, 1986
On a visit to New York City, Lewis and the others guide a Russian dog named Vladimir around the town, but have to save him from two thieves who steal dogs from Diplomats.
11b	"Fritz-Carlos Bombs Out"	S : Mark Young and Reed Robbins; T : Tony Marino	November 22, 1986
Fritz becomes jealous when Hazel's old boyfriend comes for a visit.
12	"New Tricks"	Mark Edens	November 29, 1986
Rocki hopes to become a performer after coming to the circus.
13	"Mad Dogs and Englishmen"	S : Mark Young and Reed Robbins; T : Mark Edens	December 6, 1986
Lewis tries to save Annabelle from some counterfeiters in London.

=== Season 2 (1987) ===
No. overall	No. in season	Title	Written by	Original release date
14a	1a	"Pepe's Pet Peeve"	Kristina Mazzotti	September 3, 1987
Pepe turns to Foofur for help to remove a dog named Killer from Mrs. Escrow's house. What Pepe doesn't know is that Killer is not dangerous as he expects.
14b	1b	"Clothes Make the Dog"	Marion Wells	September 3, 1987
Pepe hopes to win the heart of a poodle at a dog show.
15a	2a	"Boot Camp Blues"	Mark Cassutt	September 10, 1987
Fritz enrolls to a boot camp, when he thought he is re-enrolling in the Foreign Legion, and Foofur and Louis are involved.
15b	2b	"My Pharoah Lady"	Mark Edens	September 10, 1987
Fencer tries to win the heart of an archeologist's cat.
16a	3a	"What Price Fleadom?"	Kenneth Knox	September 17, 1987
The rats infest Hazel with circus fleas.
16b	3b	"Winging It"	Marie Quick	September 17, 1987
Annabelle befriends a chick, which matures into a chicken.
17a	4a	"The Dog's Meow"	Barry Blitzer	October 3, 1987
Louis is hypnotized by a TV hypnotist into thinking he is a cat. At the same time, Louis is to fight Muggsy, who insulted Annabell.
17b	4b	"Friend Foofur's Foul-Up"	Dennis Marks	October 3, 1987
Foofur switches places with an old friend at the Happy Glen Country Club.
18a	5a	"Alone at Last, Dahling"	Gary Greenfield	October 10, 1987
Fritz-Carlos is fed up with his friends cutting into his alone time with Hazel, so Foofur sneaks the both of them into a cruise ship, but things go awry.
18b	5b	"Tooth or Consequences"	M.R. Wells	October 10, 1987
Foofur gets a toothache, just as he and his pals face against Burt's friends, called the Swells in a game of tug of war.
19a	6a	"Fencer Finds a Family"	Mark Edens	October 17, 1987
After he is tricked by Louis and Fritz-Carlos into a swimming pool, Fencer leaves to join the Cat Pack, but he doesn't know they are going to use him to commit crimes.
19b	6b	"The Nose Knows"	Kenneth Knox	October 17, 1987
After Rocki returns home late because she was lost, Foofur brings her to the wilderness to teach her how to track while avoiding a hunter's dog with an incredible sense of smell.
20a	7a	"Just Bumming Around"	Anthony Adams	October 24, 1987
After Foofur grounds Rocki for running the risk of being spotted and not ruining the neighbor's flower bed, she and Irma's two pups run away.
20b	7b	"Annabell Goes Punk"	Dennis Marks	October 24, 1987
Annabell gets a makeover from a punk stylist, and meets other punk dogs in a club called the Lavender Loft.
21a	8a	"Just Like Magic"	M.R. Wells	October 31, 1987
The Rat Brothers scare Fencer into thinking he's got one life left, while the gang thinks about using a magician's box to safeguard him from danger.
21b	8b	"Puppy Love"	S : Barry Blitzer; T : Gary Greenfield	October 31, 1987
Rocki falls in love with a dog food star, but Foofur doesn't approve since two look-a-likes (one is rude, and the other is a jokester) made a horrible impression.
22a	9a	"Weekend in the Condo"	Kenneth Knox	November 7, 1987
Foofur and the gang deal with Crooks while being in Burt's master's condo.
22b	9b	"Bye, Bye, Birdie"	M.R. Wells	November 7, 1987
The Rat Brothers scare Mrs. Escrow's canary causing Foofur and the canines to accuse Fencer of swallowing the bird and throwing him out. Fencer turns to Pepe to retrieve the bird.
23a	10a	"Fencer Gets Soul"	Kenneth Knox	November 14, 1987
Fencer goes to New Orleans for a chance to be the newest member of a soul-singing cat group. Foofur comes along, but the Cat faces competition with a mouse with a golden voice.
23b	10b	"Rocki's Big Fib"	Samantha Clemens	November 14, 1987
Rocki aids a white alligator, but is captured by Big Boombah and his gang of shipyard rats when the Rat Brothers fail to pay back a cheese tax.
24a	11a	"You Bet Your Life"	Gary Greenfield	November 21, 1987
In Las Vegas, with Lorenzo, Hazel is cheated by a couple of crooked dogs in games of rat race.
24b	11b	"Louis Sees the Light"	Don Nelson and Arthur Alsberg	November 21, 1987
Louis meets a childhood friend who is a seeing-eye dog, but has to save him from Mel and Harvey while getting a blind boy to reunite him with his dog.
25a	12a	"Annabell Gets Framed"	M.R. Wells	November 28, 1987
After Mrs. Escrow's glasses fall on Annabell's eyes, she and her friends get her a pair of glasses, but Annabell's relationship with Louis begins to falter when Louis feels threatened.
25b	12b	"Scary Harry"	Samantha Clemens	November 28, 1987
While trying to join a club, Rocki encounters an easily scared green dog named Harry in an abandoned dog pound.
26	13	"Look Homeward, Foofur"	Mark Edens	December 5, 1987
Foofur tells Rocki a story of how he first met his friends while searching the town for the house that his brother, sister, and owners live.

== Home media ==
In the late 1980s and early 1990s, a number of episodes of the series were released on VHS in the United States by Celebrity Home Entertainment's Just for Kids label.

== Reception ==
In 2014, listing it among twelve 1980s animated series that supposedly did not deserve remembrance, io9 criticized the series, perceiving its premise to be contrived and remarking that "someone had the gall to think this was 'cool'".
