= Don't Try to Stop It =

- 7" cover sleeve

Single by Roman Holliday

from the album Cookin' on the Roof
- B-side: "Beat My Time"
- Released: 10 June 1983
- Length: 2:56
- Label: Jive
- Songwriter: Brian Bonhomme

"Don't Try to Stop It" is a song released as the second single by British band Roman Holliday. It was released on 10 June 1983 as a 7", 12" and 7" shaped picture disc single. It was the band's biggest hit, peaking at No. 14 in the UK. The song also charted later that year in the U.S. at No. 68.

== Track listing ==
- Side A: "Don't Try to Stop It" (2:56) - written by Brian Bonhomme
- Side B: "Beat My Time" (1:56) - written by Brian Bonhomme and Steve Lambert

== Charts ==
Chart (1983)	Peak position
UK Singles (OCC)	14
US Billboard Hot 100	68
