= Mark L. Taylor =

American actor (born 1950)

- Born: Mark Lawrence Taylor; October 25, 1950 (age 75); Houston, Texas, U.S.
- Occupation: Actor
- Years active: 1976–present

Mark Lawrence Taylor (born October 25, 1950) is an American actor, known for his roles in such films as Innerspace (1987), Honey, I Shrunk the Kids (1989), Arachnophobia (1990), and High School Musical 2 (2007), as well as television series such as Superman (1988), and The Mask: Animated Series (1995–97).

== Filmography ==
=== Film ===
Year	Title	Role	Notes
1976	Mother, Jugs & Speed	Doctor Who Refuses to Take Pregnant Woman	Uncredited
1976	Marathon Man	Columbia Student	Uncredited
1977	Damnation Alley	Haskins	
1980	Serial	Cult Member 1	
1980	Raise the Titanic	Spence	
1980	Any Which Way You Can	Desk Clerk	
1981	Separate Ways	Paul	
1982	The American Adventure	Union Brother	Voice
1986	Weekend Warriors	Captain Cabot	
1987	Angel Heart	Voodoo Dancer	
1987	Innerspace	Dr. Niles	
1987	Born in East L.A.	TV Evangelist	
1987	Ultraman: The Adventure Begins	Mark Watkins	Voice, television film Credited as Mark Taylor
1988	Memories of Me	2nd Assistant Director	
1989	Honey, I Shrunk the Kids	Don Forrester	
1990	Arachnophobia	Jerry Manley	
1993	Homeward Bound: The Incredible Journey	Kirkwood	
1993	The Halloween Tree		Voice, television film
1994	Flashfire	Curt	
1995	Jury Duty	Russell Cadbury	
1997	Meet Wally Sparks	Harvey Bishop	
1997	Eight Days a Week	Peter's Father	
2000	The Other Me	Dad	Television film
2001	Last Ride	Dave's Dad	
2002	Fangs	Arthur Fuller	
2003	Eddie's Million Dollar Cook-Off	Hank Ogden	Television film
2007	High School Musical 2	Thomas Fulton	Television film
2010	Jackboots on Whitehall	Camp Nazis	Voice

=== Television ===
Year	Title	Role	Notes
1979	M*A*S*H	O'Malley	Episode: "C*A*V*E"
1982	Mork & Mindy/Laverne & Shirley/Fonz Hour	Hamilton DuPont	Voice, 6 episodes
1984	Super Friends: The Legendary Super Powers Show	Firestorm	Voice, 8 episodes
1985	The Super Powers Team: Galactic Guardians	Firestorm	Voice, 7 episodes
1986	Foofur	Additional voices	Voice, 13 episodes
1988	Superman	Jimmy Olsen	Voice, 13 episodes
1989	Star Trek: The Next Generation	Haritath	Episode: "The Ensigns of Command"
1992	Batman: The Animated Series	Courier McWhirter	Voice, episode: "The Cape and Cowl Conspiracy"
1993	The Young Indiana Jones Chronicles	Professor John Thompson	Episode: "Princeton, February 1916"
1993	Nick & Noel	Howard	Voice, television film
1994	Seinfeld	Michael	Episode: "The Hamptons"
1995	Double Rush	Reggie Lee	Episode: "Snowings and Goings"
1995–1997	The Mask: Animated Series	Charlie Schumaker	Voice, 25 episodes
1996	The Incredible Hulk	Donald Blake	Voice, episode: "Mortal Bounds"
1996	JAG	Michael Gallant	Episode: "Recovery"
1996	Star Trek: Voyager	Jarlath	Episode: "Displaced"
1996	The Real Adventures of Jonny Quest	Brother James, Soldier	Voice, episode: "Rage's Burning Wheel"
1996–2003	Dexter's Laboratory	Additional voices	Voice, 78 episodes
1997–1999	Melrose Place	Dr. Louis Visconti	20 episodes
1998	The Sylvester & Tweety Mysteries	Will Bates, Mr. Fontleroy	Voice, 2 episodes
1998	Pinky and the Brain	Pollister	Voice, episode: "You'll Never Eat Food Pellets in This Town Again!"
1998	Beyond Belief: Fact or Fiction	Father	Episode: Season 2, Episode 2
1998–2005	The Powerpuff Girls	Additional voices	Voice, 78 episodes
2005–2006	W.I.T.C.H.	Thomas Brown, Alborn, Billy the TV	Voice, 3 episodes
2009	Ghost Whisperer	Doug Clarkson	Episode: "Delusions of Grandview"
2016	How to Get Away with Murder	Vince Levin	4 episodes
2016	Transformers: Rescue Bots	Bertram Luskey, Driver	Voice, episode: "Hot Rod Bot"
2018	Grey’s Anatomy	Dave Buckley	Episode 3 season 15, “Gut Feeling”
2019–2020	The Rocketeer	Farmer McGinty, Mr. Stefan	Voice, 5 episodes
2023	NCIS	Dr. Harvey Kimball	Episode: "Head Games"
2024	Young Sheldon	Lyndon	Episode: "A Proper Wedding and a Skeleton in the Closet"
