= The Funtastic World of Hanna-Barbera =

TV programming block

- Network: Syndication
- Launched: September 15, 1985
- Closed: 1994
- Country of origin: United States
- Owner: Hanna-Barbera Productions (programming); Worldvision Enterprises (distributor, 1985–1991); Turner Program Services (distributor, 1991–1994)
- Running time: 90 minutes (1985–1986); 120 minutes (1986–1994)

The Funtastic World of Hanna-Barbera is an American animated syndicated live-action weekly programming block produced by Hanna-Barbera Productions. The program ran from 1985 to 1994.

== Overview ==
The block premiered on Sunday, September 15, 1985, and included an array of both old and new Hanna-Barbera icons with their original cartoon shows. The series aired on Sundays in most markets, but some stations broadcast it on both Weekdays and Saturdays. The 1985 to 1987 season was hosted by legendary Hanna-Barbera mainstays, Yogi Bear, Quick Draw McGraw, Huckleberry Hound, and Snagglepuss in their live action costumed forms (all voiced by Daws Butler).

Each show included HBTV segments, featuring music videos of Hanna-Barbera cartoon clips. "It's Fun, Fun, Fun, Fun, Funtastic!", was the main theme song for the Funtastic World's first three seasons and it also became the theme for Yogi's newest series, Yogi's Treasure Hunt. Next, "The Down and Dirty Dinosaurs" from the game show Skedaddle hosted the 1988 edition, and then the 1990 edition was hosted by Kenny Ford and Jennifer Love Hewitt.

The shows featured in the animation block had both a superstar and superhero lineup of both old and new H-B animated characters. The block ran from 1985 to 1994 the Funtastic World series originally started out as a 3 & a 1/2 hour 5 in 1 cartoon super block which featured Challenge of the GoBots, The Jetsons, Paw Paws, Yogi's Treasure Hunt, and Galtar and the Golden Lance. The block went to a 4 & a 1/2 hour in 1986 with the additions of both The Flintstone Kids featuring the return of Captain Caveman and The New Adventures of Jonny Quest. In the block's final year, two of its shows, SWAT Kats: The Radical Squadron and 2 Stupid Dogs, also aired on TBS Sunday mornings.

== Distribution ==
The block was originally distributed by Worldvision Enterprises, then moved to Turner Program Services after the sale of the Hanna-Barbera studio to Turner Broadcasting. Most of the shows that aired on the block are now distributed by Warner Bros. Television Distribution. When it first aired, The Funtastic World of Hanna-Barbera could be seen on all independent stations owned by Taft, the parent company of Hanna-Barbera Productions and Worldvision Enterprises at the time.

== Stations ==
When The Funtastic World of Hanna-Barbera first launched on Sunday, September 15, 1985, it was also pre-sold to Taft Broadcasting, Tribune, Metromedia, and Chris-Craft owned stations.

City	Station
Atlanta	WGNX 46 (Ind)
Baltimore	WNUV 54 (Ind)
Bangor	WVII 7 (ABC)
Baton Rouge	WKG 49/KBTR 19 (Ind)
Boston	WXNE 25 (Ind)
Buffalo	WUTV 29 (Fox)
Burlington	KJMH 26 (Ind)
Charlotte	WJZY 46 (Ind)
Chicago	WPWR 50 (Ind)
Cleveland	WRLM 67 (Ind)
Detroit	WXON 20 (Ind)
Flint	WSMH 66 (Fox)
Fort Pierce/West Palm Beach	WTVX 34 (Ind)
Fresno	KAIL 53 (Ind)
Greenville	WHNS 21 (Ind)
Greeneville/Bristol	WEMT 39 (Fox)
Hagerstown	WHAG 25 (NBC)
Hartford	WTIC 61 (Fox)
Houston	KTXH 20 (Ind)
Kansas City	KSHB 41 (Fox)
Lansing	WSYM 47 (Ind)
Las Vegas	KVVU 5 (Fox)
Los Angeles	KCOP 13 (Ind)
Miami	WCIX 6 (Fox)
Minneapolis	KMSP 9 (Ind); KTMA 23 (Ind)
Omaha	KPTM 42 (Ind)
Pensacola/Mobile	WJTC 44 (Ind)
Philadelphia	WTXF 29 (Fox)
Portsmouth/Norfolk	WYAH 27 (Ind)
Peoria	WYZZ 43 (Fox)
Plattsburgh/Burlington	WPTZ 5 (NBC)
Milwaukee	WVTV 18 (Ind)
Sacramento	KTXL 40 (Fox)
San Diego	KUSI 51 (Ind)
San Francisco	KBHK-TV 44 (Ind); KOFY 20 (Ind)
Secaucus/New York City	WWOR 9 (Ind)
South Bend	WNDU 16 (NBC)
Spokane	KSKN 22 (Ind)
St. Louis	KPLR 11 (Ind)
Tacoma/Seattle	KCPQ 13 (Fox)
Tampa	WFTS 28 (Ind)
Traverse City	WGTU 29 (ABC)
Washington, D.C.	WDCA 20 (Ind); WFTY 50 (Ind)
York/Harrisburg	WPMT 43 (Fox)

== Shows ==
- The Adventures of Don Coyote and Sancho Panda (1990–93)
- Dastardly and Muttley in Their Flying Machines (1993–94)
- Fantastic Max (1988–92)
- The Flintstone Kids (1988)
- A Pup Named Scooby-Doo (1988-91)
- The Further Adventures of SuperTed (1989–90)
- Galtar and the Golden Lance (1985–87, 1988–89)
- HBTV (1985–87)
- The Jetsons (1993–94)
- Jonny Quest/The New Adventures of Jonny Quest (1986–89)
- Midnight Patrol: Adventures in the Dream Zone (1990–91)
- Paw Paws (1985–87)
- Paddington Bear (1989–90)
- The Pirates of Dark Water (1992–93)
- Richie Rich (1988–92)
- Skedaddle (1988)
- Sky Commanders (1987–88)
- Snorks (1987–89)
- SWAT Kats: The Radical Squadron (1993–94)
- 2 Stupid Dogs (1993–94)
- Yogi's Treasure Hunt (1985–88)
- Yo Yogi! (1992–93)
- Young Robin Hood (1991–93)
