= Randall Jahnson =

American writer, director and producer (born 1959)

- Born: 1959 (age 66–67); United States
- Other name: J. Randal Johnson
- Occupations: Screenwriter; playwright; director; film producer; music video director
- Years active: 1984–present
- Website: randalljahnson.com

Randall Jahnson is an American writer, director and producer. His works include Dudes (1987), The Doors (1991), The Mask of Zorro (1998), Sunset Strip (2000), and episodes of the HBO TV series Tales from the Crypt. Also, Jahson co-wrote Dryads – Girls Don't Cry with Stan Hellevig, which was released in Norway in 2015. Jahnson also directed music videos for Stan Ridgway, Henry Rollins, Black Flag, and Minutemen. In 1987, he launched the independent record label Blue Yonder Sounds in Los Angeles. The label released four studio albums: Civilization and Its Discotheques by the Fibonaccis, Bigger than Breakfast by Slack, Three Gals, Three Guitars by Del Rubio Triplets, and Motel Cafe by Michael C. Ford.

He also wrote Gun, a Western-themed video game which was voted Best Story at the 2005 IGN Video Game Awards.

== Filmography ==
=== Film ===
- Dudes (1987)
- The Doors (1991)
- The Mask of Zorro (1998)
- Sunset Strip (2000)
- Dryads – Girls Don't Cry (2015)

=== Television ===
- Tales from the Crypt (1990–1992)

=== Music videos ===
- "This Ain't No Picnic", Minutemen (1984)
- "Ain't Talkin' 'bout Love", Minutemen (1984)
- "King of the Hill", Minutemen (1985)
- "Melrose Rap", Henry Rollins (1985)
- "No Deposit, No Return", Henry Rollins (1985)
- "Drinking and Driving", Black Flag (1986)
- "Big Dumb Town", Stan Ridgway (1996)
- "Knife and Fork", Stan Ridgway (1996)

=== Video games ===
- Gun (2005)
