= Nightmare Ned (TV series) =

1997 American animated TV series

- Genre: Comedy horror
- Created by: Terry Shakespeare; G. Sue Shakespeare; David Molina
- Based on: Nightmare Ned by Terry Shakespeare; G. Sue Shakespeare
- Developed by: Walt Dohrn
- Voices of: Courtland Mead; Brad Garrett; Victoria Jackson
- Theme music composer: Steve Bartek
- Composer: Steve Bartek
- Country of origin: United States
- Original language: English
- No. of episodes: 12 (25 segments)

Production
- Executive producers: Terry Shakespeare; G. Sue Shakespeare; David Molina
- Producer: Donovan Cook
- Running time: 22 minutes approx.
- Production companies: Walt Disney Television Animation (uncredited); Creative Capers Entertainment

Original release
- Network: ABC
- Release: April 19 – July 5, 1997 (Note: Reruns continued until August 30, 1997.)

Nightmare Ned is an American animated television series which ran from April 19 to July 5, 1997, on ABC. The show was produced by Walt Disney Television Animation and Creative Capers Entertainment, and created by Terry Shakespeare, G. Sue Shakespeare, and David Molina of Creative Capers Entertainment. The show was based on and developed alongside the computer game of the same name, but the show ended up being completed before the video game was released.

Nightmare Ned focuses on the life of Ned Needlemeyer (voiced by Courtland Mead), an 8-year-old boy who deals with his daily problems through dark yet quirky nightmares. The show received mixed reviews from critics. After its original run, reruns would continue until August 30, 1997. The show was never re-released, being described as a "great oddity of the Disney Studio's television output" which was "largely disowned". As of June 2019, all episodes have been found by third parties and unofficially uploaded to YouTube.

== Characters ==
- Ned Needlemeyer (voiced by Courtland Mead): The show's protagonist, he is an 8-year-old boy who deals with his troubles through his nightmares.
- Ed Needlemeyer (voiced by Brad Garrett): Ned's father, who tries to help Ned with his problems, but this does not occur often.
- Sarah Needlemeyer (voiced by Victoria Jackson): Ned's mother, who tries to understand Ned's nightmares.
- Amy Needlemeyer (voiced by Kath Soucie): Ned's baby sister.
- Conrad and Vernon (voiced by Jeff Bennett and Rob Paulsen respectively): Two bullies who constantly pick on Ned. Conrad is heavyset with blue skin, and has a snaggletooth, whereas Vernon is tall with yellow skin and is often barefoot. They are named after Conrad Vernon, who served as one of the storyboard artists of the show.
- Ms. Bundt (voiced by Tress MacNeille): Ned's teacher.
- Joanie (voiced by Aria Curzon): A girl from Ned's school who has a crush on him. She appears in the episodes "Until Undeath Do Us Part" and briefly in "Girl Trouble".

== Production ==
The Nightmare Ned television show was developed alongside the computer game of the same name. Donovan Cook described the collaboration: "There's some crossover. We sent them our graphics. [...] We had to have our art done right away and they ended up influenced by it along the way". The series had a few guest voice actors, such as Eugene Levy, Florence Henderson, and Andrea Martin.

Nightmare Ned premiered on ABC's Saturday morning children's programming block on April 19, 1997 as a mid-season replacement for the live-action horror series Bone Chillers in the channel's line-up. The series was initially planned for only one season with an option to renew for a second, but due to production difficulties, the show was not continued after its 12-episode first season. The show ran over budget and there were creative differences between Donovan Cook, the producer and director of the show, and Walt Dohrn, the developer and also a director of the show.

== Reception ==
The show received mixed reviews from critics. The Chicago Tribune praised the show's art style but was critical of its subject matter. Similarly, Screen Rant described the show as "dark and even disturbing" and "mainly an excuse for Disney animators to show off their strange side". In contrast, Animation World Magazine described it as an "offbeat, colorful show", and it also received praise from TV Guide.

== Episodes ==
No.	Title	Directed by	Written by	Storyboard by	Original release date
1	"Ned's Life as a Dog" "A Doll's House"	Alan Smart Joan Drake	Gary Sperling and Mike Mitchell Peter Gaffney	Mike Mitchell Bob Logan and Cynthia Petrovic	April 19, 1997
When Ned is tricked into eating dog food thanks to a prank by Conrad and Vernon, he has a nightmare where he transforms into a dog. Irked by his visiting cousins who force him to play with dolls, Ned accidentally breaks one of the dolls and tries to hide the damage. He goes to bed feeling guilty about it and dreams of turning into a doll himself.
2	"Robot Ned" "Dapper Dan"	Joanna Romersa Eddy Houchins	Gary Sperling and Chuck Klein Jonathan Greenberg and Michael Fontanelli	Chuck Klein Michael Fontanelli and David Fulp	April 26, 1997
Ned and his dad bond by putting together a robot kit, but Dad's insistence on not reading the instructions leaves Ned confused. As he goes to bed, he dreams of his dad introducing the newly built robot as Ned's new brother. After being scolded by his dad for being too forgetful while playing with his toys, Ned goes to sleep trying to "remember not to forget", but ends up dreaming that he forgets to wear clothes to school.
3	"Monster Ned" "Ants"	Alan Smart Joan Drake	Creative Capers and Chris Mitchell Peter Gaffney	Chuck Klein, Bob Logan, and Chris Mitchell Robert Renzetti	May 3, 1997
For his school presentation on "If I could be anyone in the world", Ned tells his class that he would be Gorpulon, a Godzilla-like monster. Ned gets laughed at and is sent to the corner by his teacher for snapping at his classmates. Embittered, Ned falls asleep and dreams of becoming Gorpulon. Guest stars: Dean Jones as Abraham Lincoln, Florence Henderson as herself Finding a discarded ant farm, Ned's dad tries to stir up some enthusiasm in his son about the wonders of ant life, which Ned only feigns interest. Falling asleep out of boredom, Ned dreams that he and his dad have shrunken to the size of ants and end up inside the ant ranch. Guest star: April Winchell as Queen Ant
4	"Magic Bus" "Until Undeath Do Us Part"	Donovan Cook Alan Smart	Peter Gaffney	Paul Tibbitt	May 10, 1997
With Mom unable to drive him to school, she informs Ned that he will have to take the bus, much to his dismay. After going to bed, Ned dreams that his school bus is hijacked by a sinister ventriloquist dummy with a mission to drive the bus into the scorching sun. Guest stars: Eugene Levy as Mr. Nickels, Lacey Chabert as the Little Girl Ned tries to enjoy a horror movie at the theater but is constantly pestered by Joanie, a girl who has a crush on him. Ned gives her a toy ring from his candy box in hopes that she'll leave him alone, but instead gives Joanie the impression that they are now married. Ned ends up falling asleep and dreaming of being pursued by a zombie bride.
5	"Headless Lester" "My, How You've Grown"	Alan Smart Howard Parkins	Ralph Soll and Michael Fontanelli Mark Saraceni, Gary Sperling, and Chuck Klein	Michael Fontanelli Chuck Klein	May 17, 1997
While at summer camp, Ned thinks the scary stories his counselors tell are pretty lame, especially the one about the so-called "Headless Lester". Later that night, he dreams of the dreaded Lester chasing him in pursuit of a new human head. Ned is frustrated with being young and wishes he could be older. Falling asleep, he dreams of becoming a teenager. Guest star: Brian Doyle-Murray as Testosterone/"Norm"
6	"Tooth or Consequences" "Show Me the Infidel"	Howard Parkins	Ralph Soll and Mike Bell Gary Sperling and Michael Fontanelli	Mike Bell Michael Fontanelli	May 24, 1997
Upset after losing his last baby tooth, Ned hides it so the Tooth Fairy can't find it. In his dream, the Tooth Fairy visits and convinces Ned to come back with her to Tooth Land. However, Ned learns that she actually plans on robbing him of all his teeth. Guest star: Judy Tenuta as the Tooth Fairy While at the amusement park with his family, Ned wants nothing more than to ride the house of horrors. While waiting in line, Ned falls asleep and dreams that he's next in line, but is forced to ride with an obnoxious patron named Dirk, who ruins the experience for him.
7	"Willie Trout" "House of Games"	Joanna Romersa Joan Drake	Peter Gaffney and Mike Bell Peter Gaffney	Mike Bell Vince Waller	May 31, 1997
Dad tries to spend some quality time with Ned by taking him on a fishing trip, hoping to catch the legendary "Willie Trout". Bored, Ned falls asleep and dreams Willie Trout has bitten Dad's head off and he must find it within the belly of the enormous fish. Fearful that the house is haunted, Ned is assured by his dad that the spooky noises he hears are just the house "expanding and contracting" and that there's nothing to be afraid of. When Ned falls asleep, he dreams of the house and everything in it comes to life.
8	"Girl Trouble" "Canadian Bacon"	Joan Drake Joanna Romersa	Gary Sperling and Chuck Klein Peter Gaffney and Mike Bell	Chuck Klein Mike Bell	June 7, 1997
Ned is embarrassed after being tricked into using the girls' restroom by Conrad and Vernon. He ends up falling asleep in the schoolyard and dreams about becoming a girl. In his dream, the two school bullies end up falling for him. Ned brings home a piglet, but learns that one of his favorite foods, Canadian bacon, is made of pig. That night, Ned dreams that his pet pig can talk and goes to live with its family in Canada. Ned soon finds out that the pig family is trying to fatten him up in order to eat him for Christmas dinner. Guest stars: Dave Thomas as Pig Dad, Andrea Martin as Pig Mom
9	"Abduction" "Bad Report Card"	Alan Smart Howard Parkins	Gary Sperling and Michael Fontanelli Peter Gaffney and J.C. Wegman	Michael Fontanelli Jon Wegman	June 14, 1997
After watching news reports of mysterious happenings involving cattle being defaced with mustache drawings, Ned goes to bed in his cow pajamas and dreams of being abducted by aliens, who mistake him for a cow. Now Ned must find a way off the ship and save all of the Earth cows that have been abducted. Thinking he's received bad grades, Ned tears up his report card and goes to bed feeling guilty about it. He dreams that he's sent to jail for "one whole weekend" to reflect upon his actions.
10	"Testing... Testing..." "The Accordion Lesson"	Don Judge Howard Parkins	Gary Sperling and Ted Mathot Gary Sperling and Chuck Klein	Ted Mathot Chuck Klein	June 21, 1997
Ned stays up late studying and falls asleep dreaming of receiving a blank exam paper. Attempting to find the questions, Ned ends up in the surreal world of Muck the Answer Bird, who puts him in strange circumstances. To appease his mom, Ned takes accordion lessons from a strange woman named Madame Olga. Ned falls asleep and dreams that his overly-enthusiastic teacher forces him to perform as her organ-grinder monkey. Guest star: Andrea Martin as Madame Olga
11	"Along for the Ride" "Steamed Vegetables"	Joan Drake Joan Drake and Donovan Cook	Gary Sperling and Michael Fontanelli Gary Sperling and Mike Mitchell	Michael Fontanelli, Mike Bell and Chuck Klein Mike Mitchell	June 28, 1997
Ned is stuck on a family road trip, and his parents and baby sister are quickly wearing on his nerves. He falls asleep and dreams that he and his family check into a run-down motel, run by an innkeeper who gives him the creeps. Ned is forced to rehearse for his school play about nutrition and is terribly anxious. He falls asleep practicing his lines and is surprised to find himself on stage with an audience of rather angry "steamed" vegetables.
12	"Lucky Abe" (Note: This episode was originally titled "One Cent Ned".) "The Dentist" "The Ballad of Conrad and Vernon"	Alan Smart Joan Drake n/a	Mitch Watson and Paul Tibbitt Vince Waller n/a	Paul Tibbitt Vince Waller n/a	July 5, 1997
Ned accidentally swallows a penny in attempting a magic trick as seen by his idol Frank Grimes. He faints and dreams that the magician himself performs a magical surgery on him to remove the penny, in front of a live audience. Guest star: Penn Jillette as Frank Grimes Ned goes to the dentist for a checkup and assures his mom that he's perfectly able to see the dentist on his own. He falls asleep and dreams of his twisted dentist sending him on a terrifying journey through his own mouth of rotting teeth. A clip show episode where Ned recites a poem he's written about the two bullies Conrad and Vernon, and all the trouble they've caused Ned throughout the series.
