= Nightmare Ned =

1997 video game

- Developers: Creative Capers Entertainment; Window Painters Ltd
- Publisher: Disney Interactive
- Director: Walt Dohrn
- Programmer: Michael Sean Clement
- Artist: Christina Vann
- Composers: Patrick J. Collins; Jim Owen
- Platform: Microsoft Windows
- Release: October 7, 1997
- Genres: Action-adventure; Sidescroller
- Mode: Single-player

Nightmare Ned is a 1997 computer game for Microsoft Windows that was developed alongside, and served as the basis for, the animated series of the same name, which was completed before the game was released. The game was based on a concept by Sue and Terry Shakespeare. It was released on October 7, 1997.

Developed by Creative Capers Entertainment and Window Painters Ltd. and published by Disney Interactive, Nightmare Ned was Disney Interactive's first video game release that was developed by a subcontracted developer. The game was critically acclaimed and received various accolades.

== Plot ==
10-year-old Ned Needlemeyer (Courtland Mead) arrives home after school and discovers that he has his home to himself, with his parents and baby sister away for the evening. After eating a large amount of junk food and playing video games, he hears a thunderstorm begin to brew. The power goes out, and he decides to go to bed; on his way to his bedroom, what appear to be five "shadow creatures" inhibit his bed's quilt. While sleeping, Ned envisions an enormous pair of hands dragging him into a universe of nightmares linked together by a giant quilt. He must successfully trek through five nightmare worlds, each with a unique theme and cast of characters based on one of his fears, in order to overcome them.

In the game's "bad" ending, Ned wakes up the next morning and is greeted by his mother, but he is still afraid and runs out of his bedroom, while the voices of the shadow creatures, heard coming from behind a closet door, lament and argue about their failure to catch him. In the "good" ending, the true, harmless identities of the shadow creatures rally at the quilt to help Ned stop the being that brought him into the nightmare universe: a giant, monstrous Ned. As Ned attacks his monster self, he changes it into a normal copy of himself, then rips open a portal in the quilt and falls back into his own bed, waking up with his fears conquered and greeted by both of his parents. The shadow creatures are heard wondering what to do now that Ned no longer fears them.

== Gameplay ==
The game's main hub is on a quilt which resembles the one on Ned's bed. From here, Ned can travel through adventure portals into five different nightmare worlds: Ned's Graveyard Nightmare; Ned's School Nightmare; Ned's Medical Nightmare; Ned's Nightmare in the Attic, Basement and Beyond; and Ned's Bathroom Nightmare. Each nightmare world has for its boss a "shadow creature" that, through exploration of the world, eventually reveals itself to be someone or something harmless. A player can travel back to the quilt an unlimited amount of times, but whether or not the player receives the "good" ending is dependent upon traveling back eight or fewer times, representing eight hours of sleep. Each world features hidden passages between them.

The game generally features a sidescrolling interface, but utilizes multiple layers to create depth. A gamepad, joystick, or keyboard can be used as input options. Ned's yo-yo serves as the main weapon against enemies.

== Voice cast ==
- Courtland Mead as Ned Needlemeyer
- Harry Anderson as the Graveyard Shadow/Grampa Ted Needlemeyer, Ned's grandfather
- Jeff Cesario as the School Shadow/Billy Blatfield, an insecure bully
- Lani Minella as Hilda Needlemeyer, Ned's mother
- Steve Coon as the Bathroom Shadow/Ned's Toilet
- Jill Fischer as the Attic, Basement and Beyond Shadow/Sally, a young girl with a doll that talks in a disinterested voice
- Edie McClurg as the Storytelling Dragon
- Ali Wentworth as the Medical Shadow/Dr. Klutzchnik, a dentist
- Additional voices by Kyle Kozloff

== Production ==
The idea for the game was pitched before the television show started production and the two were later developed alongside each other. Donovan Cook, producer of the TV series, described the collaboration: "We actually shared a lot of ideas as we went along. [...] There's some crossover. We sent them our graphics. [...] We had to have our art done right away and they ended up influenced by it along the way". Unlike the TV series, the animation in the game used digital ink and paint. The game was intended specifically for Windows 95 and was designed to take advantage of Intel MMX technology. Nightmare Ned was the first CD-ROM to use full-motion video streaming technology. At the time of release, the game was considered a "power- and space-hungry program" for requiring 75 megabytes of hard drive space. To remedy this, two versions of the game were included on the disc—the original and one with fewer cutscenes that uses significantly less hard drive space.

The game's art style uses an "eclectic" visual mix of underground comics, 19th-century woodcuts, and anatomical diagrams. Kendall Lockhart, who was then the Vice President of creative development for Disney Interactive, described the game as being Disney's version of "'Charlie Brown' in a children's Twilight Zone meets Beetlejuice". Much of the same voice cast from the show was also utilized for the video game.

=== Release ===
Though the idea for the game was developed before the television show, the Nightmare Ned video game ended up being released months after the show had finished its run, which aired from April through July 1997. It was initially planned for a September 2, 1997 release, but this release date was evidently pushed back based on the most recent files on the CD-ROM being dated September 16; it was eventually released on October 7. The game was promoted through print ads, advertisements on Disney VHS releases, and an online campaign on Yahooligans!. A preview of the game was included on a promotional disc as a cross-promotion with the online subscription service Disney's Daily Blast and the Microsoft Network ISP. An Adobe Shockwave program that presented sound files from the game was featured on the Disney Interactive website. Sequels for the game were planned but were never released.

An unlicensed localization by Fargus Multimedia was released in Russia in late 1999 under the name Один дома: Ночные кошмарики (Odin doma: Nochnye koshmariki; Russian for "Alone at Home: Nightly Nightmares"). In 1999, the full game was included as a free bonus with copies of Disney's Villains' Revenge.

== Reception ==
Reception

Review scores
Publication	Score
PC Mag	4/5
Superkids	4/5
Time	4/5

Awards
Publication	Award
Bologna Children's Book Fair	Bologna New Media Prize (Innovation)
Communication Arts	Best in Entertainment Interactive Design
I.D. Magazine	Silver Award
Parents' Choice Foundation (Parents' Choice Award)	Silver Award

Nightmare Ned was critically acclaimed. The game received praise from Time, who noted the game as a departure from Disney's typical releases. PC Mag described the game as "so packed with great graphics and original songs that it makes other kids titles look anemic by comparison". SuperKids also praised the graphics, describing them as "slick" and using "state-of-the-art technology", but they also noted that the game had little educational value. Popular Science wrote that the "detailed background imagery" made the game feel "especially chilling". I.D. Magazine compared the game to works of Tim Burton and described it as "really sophisticated", writing that Nightmare Ned was "pushing not only gaming and illustration for kids, but also advancing ideas about game-space". Computer Gaming World said that the game had a "Nightmare Before Christmas feel." In a positive review, Cindy Caldwell from The Kid's Domain said that the game left her "both surprised and enlightened", and noted that the game had "mind-boggling puzzles" and lengthy gameplay.

Superkids described the game's navigation as "initially a bit of a coordination challenge", but went on to note that "the keyboard is a perfectly satisfactory option". They also wrote that the game was well-received by both children and teenagers. I.D. Magazine praised the game's keystroke gameplay, writing: "There are no instructions required. It allows the user to step right into the interface." Despite the acclaim, it was reported that some parents thought the game's subject matter was too frightening for its intended audience. Cindy Caldwell from The Kid's Domain recommended the game for older children, but felt that the game's "lower end of the age range" was "a little optimistic", and suggested that parents explore the game before letting younger children play.

=== Awards ===
Nightmare Ned won several awards. In 1998, it received a Parents' Choice Award. In April 1998, the game was the recipient of the Bologna New Media Prize for excellence in innovation. In June 1998, it received a silver award from I.D. Magazine. In October 1998, it received an award from Communication Arts magazine for "Best in Entertainment Interactive Design". It was also nominated for two CODiE awards in the same year for "Best Adventure/Role-Playing Software Game" and "Best Use of Visual Arts in Multimedia".
