= Spellbreaker: Secret of the Leprechauns =

1996 American fantasy film

- Film Poster
- Directed by: Ted Nicolaou
- Written by: Charles Band (Original Idea); Michael McGann (Story); Ted Nicolaou & Patrick J. Clifton (Screenplay)
- Produced by: Oana Paunescu; Vlad Paunescu
- Starring: Gregory Smith; Madeleine Potter; Godfrey James; John Bluthal; Tina Martin
- Cinematography: Adolfo Bartoli
- Edited by: Gregory Sanders
- Music by: Richard Kosinski; William Levine; John Zeretzke
- Production companies: Castel Film Romania; Full Moon Entertainment
- Distributed by: Moonbeam Entertainment; Paramount Home Video
- Release date: October 15, 1996
- Running time: 95 minutes
- Country: United States
- Language: English

Spellbreaker: Secret of the Leprechauns is a 1996 American fantasy film, starring Gregory Smith, Madeleine Potter, Godfrey James, John Bluthal and Tina Martin. It was co-written and directed by Ted Nicolaou. The film is a sequel to Leapin’ Leprechauns! and both movies were filmed back-to-back in Romania.

== Plot ==
In this sequel, Mikey travels on vacation to Ireland intending to spend sometime with his grandpa, Michael. Now, they will live another great adventure in the leprechauns's world.

== Cast ==
- Gregory Smith as Mikey Dennehy
- Madeleine Potter as Morgan / Nula
- Godfrey James as King Kevin
- John Bluthal as Michael Dennehy
- Tina Martin as Maeve, Queen of the Fairies

== Reception ==
Monster Hunter gave the film a bad review, however noting that it is better than its predecessor: "Keeping the action set in Ireland, dispensing with the lame family drama and ramping up the action up to and including a trip to the underworld where poor Mikey is forced into a leather harness so he can haul the steamer trunk full of leprechauns and his now shrunken grandfather(!) easily make Spellbreaker a two-leaf clover film to Leapin’ Leprechauns!‘s one-leaf clover blarney. And if it’s all resolved with a bit of leprechaun wish deus ex machina that seemed made up on the spot, well, that’s just something to be chalked up to the mysterious ways of those tricky Fairy Folk, right?". TV Guide gave Spellbreaker two out of five stars, stating: "even kids may be disappointed by the cheap special effects, with a crude illusion of miniaturization attempted merely by posing "leprechauns" as far away from the camera as possible, with magnified objects in the foreground. On the other hand, ornate costumes and interiors (even a properly spooky, fiery Underworld) are quite impressive, and most likely creditable to the opera and theater craftspeople of Bucharest.
