= The St. Francisville Experiment =

- Directed by: Ted Nicolaou
- Produced by: Dana Scanlan; Paul Salamoff; Gary Schmoeller
- Starring: Madison Charap; Troy Taylor; Ryan Larson; Paul James Palmer
- Cinematography: Tim Baldini
- Edited by: Jeff Bradley; Tom Vader
- Production company: The Kushner-Locke Company
- Distributed by: Lionsgate Entertainment (US); VCI Home Video (UK)
- Release date: April 15, 2000
- Running time: 79 minutes
- Country: United States
- Language: English
- Budget: $250,000

The St. Francisville Experiment is a 2000 low-budget found footage horror film directed by Ted Nicolaou. The film was released direct to VHS, and DVD on April 15, 2000, and centers upon a small group of paranormal investigators who spend a night in an old haunted mansion located in St. Francisville, Louisiana. The haunted mansion's back story was loosely based upon the true story of Delphine LaLaurie, a New Orleans socialite believed to have tortured and perhaps killed slaves in the early 1800s.

== Synopsis ==
A group of paranormal investigators are given video cameras and the opportunity to spend the night in an abandoned house rumored to be haunted. The group finds several strange things, but initially their discoveries are easily explained away. However, as the night progresses they become more and more unsettled and wonder if there is truly a supernatural force in the house.

== Cast ==
- Madison Charap as Psychic
- Troy Taylor as Ghost Historian
- Ryan Larson as History Student
- P.J. Palmer as Paul Cason
- Tim Baldini (as Tim Thompson) as Videographer Tim Thompson
- Paul Salamoff (as Paul I. Salamoff) as Producer
- Ava Jones (as Ava Kay Jones) as Voodoo Priestess
- Katherine Smith as St. Francis Paranormal Expert
- Sarah Clifford as Psychic

== Production ==
Filming for The St. Francisville Experiment took place in Louisiana and California, and the filming was actually done in three houses. Author Troy Taylor helped put together the film's concept, which was initially supposed to be a documentary rather than a fictional film, a move that he stated was done mid-production. Taylor also stated that one of the houses wasn't abandoned and that a family was currently living in it. Upon its release the movie was promoted as a real encounter with the supernatural and the names of the film's actors were not disclosed.

== Reception ==
Critical reception for The St. Francisville Experiment was extremely negative. A reviewer for JoBlo.com criticized the film, noting that "there are many scenes where it's impossible that the "actor" filmed himself from that angle", which made it "obvious that there's a cameraman there with his own equipment". Variety gave a mixed review, remarking that it "is ultimately undone by its inability to reconcile its two contradictory impulses — to be the next "Blair Witch" while mocking the hand that feeds it." Sabadino Parker for Pop Matters panned the film saying "Let's cut to the chase: The St. Francisville Experiment is bad" and ultimately advising "This is a warning: Stay away. Do not, I repeat, do not see this movie. Please, save your money and your sanity and do not ever, ever see this film."
