= Subspecies (film series) =

Romanian-American horror film series

- Directed by: Ted Nicolaou
- Written by: Jackson Barr; David Pabian; Ted Nicolaou
- Produced by: Ion Ionescu; Vlad Panescu; Oana Panescu
- Starring: see below
- Edited by: Bert Glatstein; William Young; Gregory Sanders
- Music by: Stuart Brotman; Richard Kosinski; William Levine; Michael Portis; John Zeretzke
- Production company: Full Moon Pictures
- Distributed by: Full Moon Features; Castel Film Romania
- Running time: 499–539 minutes (total of 6 films)
- Countries: Romania; United States
- Languages: English; Romanian

Subspecies is a direct-to-video horror film series produced by Full Moon Studios and Castel Film Studios. The series ran from 1991 to 2023, and followed the exploits of the vampire Radu Vladislas, portrayed by Anders Hove, and his efforts to turn Michelle Morgan (Denice Duff) into his fledgling. A spin-off film, Vampire Journals, was released in 1997, which featured characters that would go on to appear in the fourth installment. Ted Nicolaou wrote and directed all six films, including the spin-off.

The series was shot on location in Romania, utilizing stop-motion and rod puppet techniques to achieve the look the director wanted for the eponymous creatures. The films have received generally mixed reviews, with critics citing vampire clichés as a downfall, but generally commending the director's choice to film in Romania, as well as the special effects.

== Films ==
=== Subspecies (1991) ===
Subspecies (1991) follows three college students, Mara Moliva, Michelle Morgan, and Lillian, as they begin a study on Romanian culture and superstition in the small town Prejmer. They are befriended by Stefan, a student studying nocturnal animals. It is revealed that the nearby Castle Vladislas has been caught in a power struggle between vampire brothers Stefan and Radu. Centuries prior, King Vladislas was seduced and cursed by a sorceress who eventually gave birth to Radu. After banishing Radu's mother, the king met a mortal woman. She gave birth to Stefan, who prefers to live in the open, and loathes his vampire heritage. To gain control over the Bloodstone, a relic that is said to drip the blood of the saints, Radu kills his father. In an effort to hurt his brother, Radu turns Mara and Lillian into vampires. Stefan, having fallen in love with Michelle, helps her try and free Mara and Lillian from Radu's control. Stefan drives a stake through Radu's heart and severs his head with an axe, killing Radu. Unfortunately for Stefan, Radu bites Michelle before his brother can kill him and mingles his blood with hers, which forces Stefan to turn Michelle with his own blood in order to keep her from becoming like Radu. As Stefan and Michelle sleep, Radu's minions set about resurrecting their master.

=== Bloodstone: Subspecies II (1993) ===
Bloodstone: Subspecies II (1993) picks up directly after the events of the first film, with Radu's minions, the Subspecies, reattaching Radu's head and removing the stake from his heart. Radu finds Stefan and Michelle sleeping, and immediately kills Stefan. The rising sun forces Radu to seek refuge; Michelle wakes at sunset and finds Stefan dead in his coffin, with the Bloodstone still in his hands. Michelle flees to Bucharest with the Bloodstone, hoping to contact her sister, Becky, for help. Radu, with the help of his mother, "Mummy" (later identified as Circe in Blood Rise), sets out to find Michelle and the Bloodstone. Becky arrives in Romania and with the help of Lieutenant Marin, Professor Popescu, and US Embassy Agent Mel Thompson, attempts to find her sister. Radu eventually captures Michelle, who has been fighting her craving for blood since Radu took the Bloodstone. Mel and Lieutenant Marin do not believe Popescu and Becky, so the two of them go to a nearby crypt where they believe Michelle might be. Popescu is murdered by Mummy, while Becky is also captured and given to Michelle to feed from, as a way for Michelle to shed her mortal ties. Instead of killing her sister, Michelle stabs Radu in the face with an enchanted dagger, and sets fire to Radu's mother, who flees the room in flames. Becky and Michelle attempt to escape the catacomb, but Michelle is halted by the coming sunrise. Becky promises to return that evening, but as Michelle descends back into the tomb she is grabbed by a revived Mummy and carried off.

=== Bloodlust: Subspecies III (1994) ===
Bloodlust: Subspecies III (1994) finds Michelle deep in the catacombs with Radu's mother, who brings her son back from the dead with Michelle's blood and the enchanted dagger that killed him; Radu, his mother, and Michelle return to Castle Vladislas. Michelle promises to obey Radu if he teaches her everything that he knows. Radu takes Michelle out hunting so she can enhance her powers, while Mel contacts a former operative of the CIA for help. While trying to rescue Michelle, Radu's mother quickly kills Mel's CIA friend, and knocks Mel unconscious. In an effort to get Michelle to stay with him forever, Radu kills his mother when she attacks Michelle. Becky arrives to save Michelle, but before everyone leaves, Michelle takes a gun from Becky, which contains silver bullets, and shoots Radu. The rising sun slows Michelle, so she is placed inside a body bag that was brought along; the delay allows Radu time to catch up to the group. Wanting the Bloodstone, which was taken by Michelle, Radu attempts to barter the group's lives in exchange for it. Becky throws it over the roof's edge, and when Radu attempts to follow it he is engulfed in the rays of the Sun. Radu's body bursts into flames and falls from the castle wall. Becky and the group make it to their car and drive off. Radu's burning corpse is left smoldering and impaled on tree branches, with his burning blood dropping to the ground; the flames soon go out and the blood morphs into new subspecies.

=== Vampire Journals (1997) ===
Vampire Journals (1997) is a spin-off of the film series, featuring the vampire Ash. Vampire Journals follows Zachary, a vampire with a conscience, who hunts the vampire bloodline that sired him. After witnessing the love of his life get turned into a vampire, Zachary destroys both her, and his master, and former protégé of Ash, Serena. Zachary, armed with the enchanted sword of a great vampire slayer called Laertes, seeks out the rest of Serena's bloodline to eradicate them. Zachary travels to Bucharest to find Ash. Zachary uses Ash's penchant for music and women to bait him out into the open for attack. Ash sets his sights on pianist Sofia, but is thwarted by Zachary during his first attempt to take Sofia. It is revealed through a conversation between Ash and a seer that Zachary's coming was expected and that the two are destined to fight; however, Ash is to be the victor. Ash does not give up on acquiring Sofia, and hires her for his nightclub, Club Muse. Over the next few nights he drains her of blood, so that he may turn her into a new apprentice. He also makes a deal with Zachary: he will give Zachary a consort, protection from the Sun, and allow Zachary to see Sophia if he leaves the city the following night. While Ash is preparing to sire Sofia, he gives his daytime consult Iris the key to Zachary's room, so that she may dispose of his sleeping body in the sunlight. Seeing that his obsession with Sofia will ruin both their lives, Iris releases Zachary instead. Zachary arrives too late; Sophia has already accepted Ash's blood. Fighting off a weakened Ash, Zachary and Sofia escape from the nightclub. Ash follows them, but the rising sun becomes a problem. Zachary manages to get back the sword and kill Ash, whose body falls into the Sun's rays. Zachary and Sofia then find refuge in a nearby closet.

=== Subspecies 4: Bloodstorm (1998) ===
Subspecies 4: Bloodstorm (1998) begins with a badly burnt Radu able to find refuge in his crypt. A car accident takes the lives of everyone but Michelle, who is discovered by a stranger named Ana Lazar. Upon seeing Michelle's reaction to the sunlight, Ana takes her body to her former professor, Dr. Nicolescu, who quickly determines that Michelle is a vampire. When Michelle wakes, Dr. Nicolescu promises to cure her of her vampirism. Dr. Nicolescu is a vampire himself, but uses science to allow him to be immune to vampire weaknesses, with the exception of needing blood, and hopes to use Michelle to get the Bloodstone and therefore a cure for his condition. With his strength restored, Radu travels to Bucharest to claim the financial wealth of one of his previous "fledglings", Jonathan Ash, who has acquired both the Vladislas crypt and the sword of Laertes (mentioned in Vampire Journals). Radu enlists Ash's help to track down Michelle, while Ash's own fledgling, Serena, attempts to play Radu and Ash against each other. Radu discovers Michelle's location, and Dr. Nicolescu agrees to give her to Radu in exchange for three drops of blood from the Bloodstone. Radu agrees and enters Nicolescu's institution, but it was only a trick to allow Nicolescu the opportunity to capture and try to stake Radu. However, Radu's influence over Michelle compels her to appear and release Radu, and the two flee to safety. Serena arrives immediately after and gives Ana a key to the Vladislas crypt, where Radu is, with instructions on how to kill Radu. Ana and Dr. Nicolescu arrive at the tomb, but Radu awakens and kills Nicolescu. Radu turns his attention to Ana, but Michelle once again decides to stop Radu's bloodlust and slices his throat, allowing Ana enough time to decapitate Radu. They burn his body and take the Bloodstone. Ash and Serena are waiting at the opening of the crypt and attack Ana, but a caretaker, hearing Ana's screams, opens the crypt and spills sunlight inside, making both vampires flee daylight. Michelle is hidden in a coffin by Ana and the caretaker and transported out of the cemetery, while Radu's head sits on a pike and burns in the sun.

=== Subspecies V: Blood Rise (2023) ===
Blood Rise begins with the birth of Radu. Moments after, his mother Circe is impaled by crusaders from the vampire slaying order of the Knights of the Dragon. They steal her vampire slayer knife and Radu. His ears and fingers are clipped and holy potions used to hide his vampiric deformities. As an adult, Radu is raised by and initiated into the Knights of the Dragon. However, when he and a monk named Marius are sent to Prince Vladislas' castle to kill the vampires there and recover the Bloodstone, Radu learns he was a stolen child and Vladislas was his father. After Vladislas and Circe flee, Radu and Marius find a seemingly human woman named Helena, and her son Stefan. Stefan was born when Vladislas raped Helena after claiming her as a consort. Radu helps the two flee, and takes the Bloodstone with them, and Marius, afraid of Helena and Stefan being vampires, leaves. After finding out that Helena was in fact turned into a vampire, she and Radu drink from the Bloodstone, and Helena tries to turn him into a vampire to keep him from ever leaving her. In that moment, Vladislas then returns and abducts Helena and Stefan, as well as taking Radu's enchanted vampire slaying sword given to him by the Knights of the Dragon, the Sword of Laertes. Radu, believing Helena made him a vampire, is then told by Circe he was one at birth. He returns with her and over the next century, learns sorcery, demon summoning, and how to use his vampiric powers to hunt. After he attempts to steal from Circe, he is banished by her.

Grieving the loss of Helena and Stefan, he seeks out new companions to turn and finds two aspiring musicians, Ash and his sister, Ariel. Radu turns both of them into vampires and attempts to coerce them to accept him as their master while also wanting them to comfort him with music. During an attempt to play, Ariel learns that vampires are susceptible to shrill dissonant notes. Despite this, Radu "initiates them into the mysteries" and allows them their first kill outside of the castle. That night, their castle is infiltrated by Diana, another monster slayer from the Knights of the Dragon. Diana comes armed with Circe's Knife. Radu recognizes her as a stolen child descended from Callisto, like himself, but she persists in trying to slay him, and he bites her and turns her into a vampire. Ash and Ariel take the demon slaying weapons Diana brought, and attack Radu with shrill notes from a Flute, fleeing him. In the intervening centuries, Ash and Ariel come under the protection of Helena, having impaled Vladislas on the Sword of Laertes, and Stefan travelling the world. The three hunt out of a casino that has vast catacombs sprawling under it (which is implied to be the Club Muse nightclub from Vampire Journals). Radu degenerates into the vampire appearance he was born with (thus finally looking how he does in the other four films). 300 years later, He finds Ash and Ariel, who take him to Helena. The two reconnect and negotiate with each other. Radu gives Helena mastery of Ash and Ariel, but Ash and Ariel spurn Helena and the mood sours. Helena attempts to bribe Ash to accept her with a piano and a drink from the Bloodstone, while Radu takes Ariel to the catacombs under the casino to find Vladislas, where he impales him repeatedly with Laertes. Helena and Radu then encounter each other and each confesses hatred for the other. After being rejected by Helena, Radu attacks and breaks her neck. Helena curses Radu that she will be reborn and haunt him. Ash steals the Bloodstone and tries to convince Ariel to leave, but she stays with Radu, now wanting to be his consort. After the pair escape the catacombs, Diana appears and kills Ariel but leaves Radu alive, wanting Radu to suffer immortality and loneliness. In the closing narration, Radu reflects on Helena's dying curse on him, and how that was eventually fulfilled and drove him to madness, while thinking of Michelle, who resembled Helena.

List indicators

- Italics indicate a transition to a minor role, such as an extended flashback, after the initial appearance.
- A dark grey cell indicates the character was not in the film.

Character	Film					
Character	Subspecies	Bloodstone	Bloodlust	Bloodstorm	Vampire Journals	Blood Rise
King Vladislas	Angus Scrimm					Kevin Spirtas
Radu Vladislas	Anders Hove	Anders Hove	Anders Hove	Anders Hove		Anders Hove
Stefan Valescu Vladislas	Michael Watson					Jakov Marjanovic
Michelle Morgan	Laura Tate	Denice Duff	Denice Duff	Denice Duff		Denice Duff (Archive footage)
Helena						Denice Duff
Mara	Irina Movila					
Lillian	Michelle McBride					
Rosa	Mara Grigore					
Ian	Adrian Vâlcu					
Karl	Ivan J. Rado					
Mel Thompson		Kevin Spirtas (as Kevin Blair)	Kevin Spirtas (as Kevin Blair)	Cristi Rasuceanu		
Rebecca Morgan		Melanie Shatner	Melanie Shatner	Ioana Voicu		
Professor Nicoli Popescu		Michael Denish	Michael Denish			
Circe / Mummy		Pamela Gordon	Pamela Gordon			Yulia Grant
Lieutenant Marin		ro:Ion Haiduc	ro:Ion Haiduc	ro:Ion Haiduc		
Bob			Michael Dellafemina			
Jonathan Ash				Jonathon Morris	Jonathon Morris	Marko Filipovic
Ariel						Stasa Nikolic
Ana Lazar				Ioana Abur		
Dr. Ion Niculescu				ro:Mihai Dinvale		
Serena				Floriela Grappini	Floriela Grappini	
Dr. Lupu				Dan Astileanu		
Detective Voda				Gelu Nitu		
Zachery					David Gunn	
Sofia					Kirsten Cerre	
Anton					Dan Condurache	
Iris					Starr Andreeff	
Rebecca					Rodica Lupu	
Cassandra					Ilinca Goia	
Dimitri					ro:Mihai Dinvale	
Walter					Mihai Niculescu	
Oracle					Maria Dimitrache-Caraman	
Diana						Olivera Perunicic

Crew	Film					
Crew	Subspecies	Bloodstone	Bloodlust	Vampire Journals	Bloodstorm	Bloodrise
Director	Ted Nicolaou	Ted Nicolaou	Ted Nicolaou	Ted Nicolaou	Ted Nicolaou	Ted Nicolaou
Writer	Charles Band, David Pabian	Ted Nicolaou	Ted Nicolaou	Ted Nicolaou	Ted Nicolaou	Ted Nicolaou
Producer	Ion Ionescu	Oana Păunescu, Vlad Păunescu	Oana Păunescu, Vlad Păunescu	Oana Păunescu, Vlad Păunescu	Oana Păunescu, Vlad Păunescu	
Executive producer	Charles Band	Charles Band	Charles Band	Charles Band	Charles Band	Charles Band
Cinematographer	Vlad Păunescu	Vlad Păunescu	Vlad Păunescu	Adolfo Bartoli	Adolfo Bartoli	Vladimir Ilic
Soundtrack	Stuart Brotman, Richard Kosinski, William Levine, Michael Portis, John Zeretzka	Richard Kosinski, William Levine, Michael Portis, John Zeretzka	Richard Kosinski, William Levine, Michael Portis	Richard Kosinski	Richard Kosinski, William Levine, John Zeretzka	Sean Mcbridge
Scenography	Radu Corciova	Radu Corciova	Radu Corciova	Valentin Călinescu	Radu Corciova	
Costume Design	Oana Păunescu	Oana Păunescu	Oana Păunescu	Oana Păunescu	Oana Păunescu	Desi Allinger-Nelson

== Production ==
Upper image: The original subspecies creatures, as portrayed by local Romanian men wearing rubber suits Lower image: The finalized version of the creatures was created from the use of stop-motion puppets.

In 1991, Subspecies became the first American film to be filmed in Bucharest, Romania. Director Ted Nicolaou was initially apprehensive about shooting on location in Romania, but during a four-day location scout he came to love the location thanks to the free rein he had over the ancient ruins and woodland area. Other Transylvanian areas would be used for all Subspecies films, with specific location shootings at Hunedoara, Brașov, and Sinaia. Although, the remnants of communism left in the country, along with cultural differences and the general problems that accompany film productions lent to a difficult experience for the crew while shooting the first Subspecies film.

The subspecies creatures, which were created from Radu's blood, originally began as local Romanian men in rubber suits. The men were filmed on over-scaled sets to simulate the miniature size of the creatures. The performances of the Romanian men, along with the design of the rubber suits, caused director Ted Nicolaou to rethink his approach. Nicolaou brought in animator David W. Allen to assist him in creating "more magical" looking subspecies creatures. Allen went through all of the film footage that contained the Romanian extras in their rubber suits with the film's editor in order to find usable footage before and after the men enter the scene. Allen would use the isolated footage to develop a new background for the animated creatures he would later create. Allen created two puppet types, displayed in front of a bluescreen: a stop-motion puppet and a rod puppet. Each of the puppet types was composed of foam rubber, and held similar skeletal systems. Some differences between the two types include tension-filled joints for the stop-motion puppet, while the rod puppet was looser. The flexibility of the rod-puppet allowed for faster movements, which were needed occasionally for real-time filming.

For Bloodstone and Bloodlust, Wayne Toth and Norman Cabrera came on board to create the special make-up effects for the films; they also pulled double duty composing and performing the music, alongside Romanian musicians, for a portion of Bloodstone. The limited budget that Toth and Cabrera had to work forced them to use any location they could find in order to apply the make-up to the actors, as they did not have a separate workstation. Make-up trailers would be created in local resident's homes, cave openings, inside of cars, or just sitting on the side of the road. To create Radu's face, Toth and Cabrera applied four separate prosthetic pieces to Anders Hove's forehead, left and right cheek, and his chin. A cosmetic make-up is applied over his entire face to help conceal those four prosthetics. This was the same process used in the original Subspecies film, although Toth and Cabrera admit to tweaking the coloring of Radu's skin. One major change to the make-up process was to Radu's hands. In the original film, Hove had to wear individual appliances on each of his fingers, but to cut back on the time needed to apply the make-up, Toth and Cabrera created a pair of prosthetic gloves that Hove could slip on his hands. For "Mummy", Radu's sorceress mother, a headpiece was cast from Pamela Gordon, which included her shoulders as well. After the make-up was applied to give the cast a "dry" and "mummified" appearance, it was slipped over Gordon's head leaving only her face showing. From there, Toth and Cabrera applied a separate face prosthetic. The facial appliance gave Gordon near zero visibility, having only a single eye slit for her left eye. The crew had to escort her around sets so that she would not injure herself. Gordon was given a pair of dentures to wear, as well as some prosthetic gloves similar to what Hove wore. The rest of Gordon's body was draped in clothing to conceal it.

Plans for a fifth film date back to as early as November 2010, when Charles Band revealed in an interview with FearCast that they had completed a script for a prequel but were experiencing issues with funding. Subspecies V: Blood Rise (2023) was announced in April 2019, as part of Full Moon's "Deadly Ten" initiative with Hove and Duff as Radu Vladislas and Helena, a vampire queen that resembled Michelle, respectively. Kevin Spirtas portrayed Radu's father, Prince Vladislas, while Marko Filipovic took over for the role of the Vampire Ash from Vampire Journals and Bloodstorm, where he had been played by Jonathon Morris. Filming was to begin in July 2020 in Croatia but was postponed due to the COVID-19 pandemic. Filming was rescheduled for spring 2022 in Serbia. Principal photography eventually took place in September 2022. The film had its world premiere at the HorrorHound Convention in Cincinnati, Ohio on March 25, 2023. It received a limited theatrical release via the Alamo Drafthouse on May 15, 2023.

== Reception ==
Culture Cartel critic Mike Bracken believed the story was "largely clichéd", coupled with "bad acting" on the part of Watson and the female cast, but commended the realism Nicolaou created by shooting on location in Romania—using Romanian residents for smaller roles in the film—as well as the fact that the film does not "take itself too seriously", making it "more fun" than Francis Ford Coppola's Dracula. Cold Fusion Video's Nathan Shumate echoed Bracken's opinion on the "authenticity" created from the Romanian landscaping and actors that gave "the feel of verisimilitude", but criticized the stop-motion subspecies as being "irrelevant to the main action", and the story as a "general lack of urgency". Richard Scheib, a critic for science fiction, horror, and fantasy review website Moria, felt the original film "showed promise" when it attempted to go "back to the folklore roots of vampirism"; he also liked the authentic feeling from shooting in Romania, but felt the limited budget restricted the film from being convincing, with David Allen's stop-motion subspecies creatures being a disappointment. When he had a chance to review Bloodstone, Scheib felt the sequel delivered "vampire clichés", but again "showed promise" with its imaginative make-up effects—specifically the staking of Stefan, the reattachment of Radu's head by the subspecies creatures, the look of Mummy—as well as the visual effects of Radu's shadow stalking Michelle through town, which gave Scheib a sense of Nosferatu. Another criticism from Scheib was with the replacement of Laura Tate with Denice Duff; Scheib characterizes Duff as "internalized and afraid", as opposed to the addition of Melanie Shatner's character, Rebecca Morgan, who he classifies as "alert and intelligent".

DVDschlock wrote that the film series "manage to give an edge of bad-assitude to its vampires", and that "each entertains in its own right and furthers the Subspecies tale one more step beyond the last one... until finally being beaten over the head by a shovel with the stinky Vampire Journals". In a review by LaserDisc, it was felt that one consistency through the series was Radu, whose villainy is "effectively embodied" by Anders Hove. LaserDisc also believed that the sequels sustained the entertainment value through their intelligent use of eroticism, gore and on-location setting.

== Home media ==
The first four Subspecies films were released direct-to-video on VHS in 1991, 1993, 1994, and 1998. The first three films were also released on Laserdisc. A DVD collection titled Subspecies: The Epic Collection was released in 2007, including the first four main films and the spin-off Vampire Journals. Subspecies received its first Blu-ray release on August 16, 2011.Subspecies II and III were both released on Blu-ray on May 21, 2013, alongside a collection titled Subspecies: The Blu-ray Collection, which included the first three films.

Subspecies 4: Bloodstorm was released on DVD on December 22, 1998. Due to issues with the original film negative, Subspecies 4 did not receive a Blu-ray release until February 8, 2024, when it was included in a box set containing the other four main films as well as Vampire Journals.

Subspecies V: Bloodrise was released on DVD and Blu-ray on July 18, 2023. It was later re-released as part of the complete box set alongside the other four films and Vampire Journals.

== Other media ==
In 1991, Full Moon teamed with Eternity Comics to produce comic books series for a handful of Full Moon's titles. Among these comics was a Subspecies series that served as a prequel to the first film. The title ran as a four-issue mini-series. Another comic series was published in 2018 by Action Lab Comics, lasting three issues. In 2021, the character Radu became a playable character in the multiplayer horror game "Horror Legends".

== See also ==
- Decadent Evil
- Vampire film
