= John Zeretzke =

American teacher and composer

- Genres: World music
- Occupations: Teacher, musician, composer
- Instruments: Flute, violin
- Website: Official website

John Edward Zeretzke is an American teacher, flute player, composer, and convicted sex offender. After conducting flute making workshops with school children for many years, he was accused of lewd conduct with children in 2017 and other sex charges in 2019. Many of the charges are related to his flutes, specifically that they were tainted with Zeretzke's semen.

== Teaching ==
Zeretzke taught music to children and young adults for over 30 years through the Los Angeles Music Center. He also taught summer programs through the Segerstrom Center for the Arts in Orange County.

== Flutes Across the World ==
In 2009, Zeretzke founded and directed Flutes Across the World, a humanitarian and educational organization. It is a 501(c)(3) charitable organization that registered in 2013.

For the program, Zeretzke taught students to make flutes out of PVC piping, corks and hot glue. Each student decorated two to send to children in the least developed countries. These flutes wound up in the Philippines, Central America and Haiti.

== Film scoring ==
Zeretze composed the soundtracks for:

- Subspecies
- Bloodstone: Subspecies II
- Subspecies: The Awakening
- Leapin’ Leprechauns!
- Spellbreaker: Secret of the Leprechauns

== Awards ==
- 1995 Horton Award for Music for Dance for Light (with Laura Dean)
- In 1999, Zeretzke's work with children was recognized with the Professional Artists in Schools Award.
- Zeretzke was given the 2009 Lifetime Achievement in the Arts Award by the City of Ojai.

== Criminal charges ==
Zeretzke was arrested in 2017 by Los Angeles County police and federal postal inspectors, who accused him of lewd conduct with children, coercing a girl to produce child pornography, attempting to entice another person to send him sexually explicit images, receiving child pornography over the internet, and traveling to the Philippines to engage in sex with minors. He pleaded not guilty to all charges and was held in the Orange County Jail. The California state attorney general announced on July 8, 2020, that he was sentenced in Orange County Superior Court to 18 years in state prison after pleading guilty to six counts of committing lewd acts against five girls under 14 by tainting their flutes with his semen. The acts were committed between January 1 and April 30, 2017.
