= 2 Stupid Dogs =

American animated television series

- Genre: Comedy
- Created by: Donovan Cook
- Directed by: Donovan Cook (season 1)
- Voices of: Mark Schiff; Brad Garrett; Brian Cummings; Jess Harnell; Jim Cummings; Tony Jay
- Theme music composer: Chris Desmond; Tom Seufert
- Opening theme: "2 Stupid Dogs Title Theme"
- Ending theme: "2 Stupid Dogs Ending Theme"
- Composers: Chris Desmond (Note: Episodes 1–4); Vaughn Johnson (Note: Episodes 5–26); Guy Moon (Note: Additional music)
- Country of origin: United States
- Original language: English
- No. of seasons: 2
- No. of episodes: 26 (Note: 39 segments) (list of episodes)

Production
- Executive producer: Buzz Potamkin
- Producers: Donovan Cook (Note: Season 1, supervising producer, season 2); Larry Huber
- Running time: 22 minutes (Note: Each episode of the first season consists of three segments, with two 2 Stupid Dogs shorts bookending a Super Secret Secret Squirrel short. Cumulatively, each episode is approximately 22 minutes in length, which amounts to roughly 7 minutes per segment.)
- Production company: Hanna-Barbera Cartoons

Original release
- Network: TBS
- Release: September 5, 1993 – February 13, 1995

2 Stupid Dogs is an American animated television series created by Donovan Cook and produced by Hanna-Barbera Cartoons for TBS. It originally ran from September 5, 1993, to February 13, 1995, as part of TBS's Sunday Morning in Front of the TV block and in syndication. The show's main segments feature two unnamed dogs, called the "Little Dog" and the "Big Dog" in the credits (voiced by Mark Schiff and Brad Garrett, respectively). The show entirely used digital ink and paint in every episode.

The show has been described as "Hanna-Barbera's answer to Ren and Stimpy", a hit show created by Hanna-Barbera alumnus John Kricfalusi (who served as a consultant on the series) and premiered two years earlier in 1991 on Nickelodeon. Like Ren and Stimpy, the titular Dogs are not very bright, the show is scored with jazz music, and the comedy style leans on gross-out body-secretion humor. It was the first show put into production by Hanna-Barbera's new president, Fred Seibert, in 1992, but asked about the comparison, Hanna-Barbera CEO Seibert was unconcerned, saying that it was "like Pearl Jam worrying about being compared to Nirvana."

A backup segment, Super Secret Secret Squirrel (a reboot series to Secret Squirrel), is shown in between the main 2 Stupid Dogs cartoons in the first season's episodes, similar to early Hanna-Barbera cartoons from the 1960s. The series served as a precursor to much of the original programming on Cartoon Network, where Hanna-Barbera would earn more success with series similar in tone.

== Plot ==
The show, as the title suggests, is about two unintelligent and unnamed dogs, and their everyday misadventures. The animation style in the first season is unusual for the time: a very flat and simplistic style similar to the early Hanna-Barbera cartoons of the 1950s and 1960s, but with early 1990s humor and sensibility. The wilder, more absurd second season has more fluid and exaggerated character animation.

== Characters ==
- The Little Dog (voiced by Mark Schiff) is a small, tawny-colored Dachshund, is much more energetic and hyperactive than the Big Dog. The Little Dog is very scared of cats, and when a cat (usually the same cat) appears, it is the Big Dog who scares it away.
- The Big Dog (voiced by Brad Garrett) is a large grey Old English Sheepdog with a purple nose. He is much stronger and significantly more stoic and reserved than the Little Dog, and speaks much less – when the Big Dog talks, he usually talks about food. On occasion, he has also been shown to be surprisingly smarter than the Little Dog.
- The Cat is a small innocent cat which the Little Dog is terrified of, despite it being harmless. The Big Dog's bark causes the Cat to freeze in terror; however, the Cat is not afraid of the Big Dog unless he barks.
- Mr. Hollywood (voiced by Brian Cummings) is a large man who is both arrogant and loud, and likes to point out others' mistakes. He has a completely different job in each appearance, including teacher, farmer, casino manager, Noah and pet shop salesman. When pointing out others' mistakes he will first say, "Well now, isn't that cute..." and then yell out, "...but it's wrong!", usually accompanied by a blaring foghorn.
- Cubby (voiced by Rob Paulsen) is a fat, spotty man with big glasses, blonde hair and blue lips. In the episodes that he appears in, he works at various jobs, like Mr. Hollywood.
- Kenny Fowler (voiced by Jarrett Lennon) is a small skinny kid with nerdy glasses, who is often pushed around by Buzz. He is on friendly terms with the dogs.
- Buzz (voiced by Whit Hertford) is a school bully who picks on Kenny and says "What a Fowler!" whenever Kenny falls or makes a mistake.
- Buffy Ziegenhagen (voiced by Tawni Tamietti) is a girl in Kenny's class who he has a crush on and who has a secret crush on him.
- Red (voiced by Candi Milo) is a small, meek little girl that the dogs sometimes encounter in the woods. When she speaks, she shouts one word (sometimes two) in the sentence very loudly compared to the quiet tone of voice she usually has. Trying to visit her grandmother, she ends up in trouble due to her bad eyesight and the dogs' stupidity.

== Episodes ==
=== Series overview ===
| Season | Episodes | Originally released | |
| Season | Episodes | First released | Last released |
|---|---|---|---|
| 1 | 13 | September 5, 1993 | November 28, 1993 |
| 2 | 13 | September 5, 1994 | February 13, 1995 |

=== Season 1 (1993) ===
Note: All episodes in this season were directed by Donovan Cook.

| No. overall | No. in season | Title | Written by | Storyboard by | Original release date | Prod. code |
|---|---|---|---|---|---|---|
| 1a | 1a | "Door Jam" | Bobs Gannaway | Mike Mitchell | September 5, 1993 | 213 |
After the Big Dog loses a can that he was chewing on, the duo follow it down the path that it rolls into, only to find the can trapped behind an automatic door. The Little Dog suggests the door will not open because they lack shoes, so they go hunting for several. They manage to get in, only to lose the can again outside.
| 1b | 1b | "Where's the Bone?" | Bobs Gannaway | Genndy Tartakovsky | September 5, 1993 | 211 |
The Little Dog finds himself distraught over the loss of his favorite bone, so he enlists the help of the Big Dog to help him find it. Unbeknownst to the Little Dog, it actually rests on the back of his head.
| 2a | 2a | "Cornflakes" | Mark Saraceni | Rob Renzetti | September 12, 1993 | 112 |
The dogs stumble upon a farm managed by Mr. Hollywood. The dogs get hungry as Hollywood describes the purpose of a farm, and decide that they want corn flakes for breakfast.
| 2b | 2b | "Home Is Where Your Head Is" | Mark Saraceni | Tony Craig | September 12, 1993 | 114 |
While walking together, the Big Dog sticks his head through a hole in a fence. The Little Dog, thinking his friend is stuck, starts to panic while trying to devise a way to get the Big Dog out of his predicament. When he runs out of willpower, the Little Dog decides to adapt to life without the Big Dog.
| 3a | 3a | "Vegas Buffet" | Mark Saraceni | Tony Craig | September 19, 1993 | 210 |
The dogs head to the Lucky Nugget to eat at the "Super Cheap Economy Style One Pound Hot Dog Buffet". When they arrive early, they have to wait. The Big Dog finds a coin and inserts it in a slot machine, only to find that they have won the jackpot. When they attract the attention of the casino owner, Mr. Hollywood, he plans to get his money back by taking the dogs around to the other games, when they just want the buffet. He invites them to bet everything, only for them to win even more money.
| 3b | 3b | "Love in the Park" | Bobs Gannaway | Tony Craig | September 19, 1993 | 207 |
While spending the day in the park, the Little Dog falls in love with a little toy dog that is only shown to bark twice and perform a flip. At the same time, the Big Dog attempts to return a Frisbee to a little girl who threw it to him.
| 4a | 4a | "Show and Tell" | Mark Saraceni | Conrad Vernon | September 26, 1993 | 109 |
It is show and tell at Kenny's school and he plans to bring his father's bowling trophy, but when it breaks, he decides to bring the dogs to class instead.
| 4b | 4b | "At the Drive In" | Mark Saraceni | Conrad Vernon | September 26, 1993 | 117 |
After seeing an intermission commercial à la "Let's All Go to the Lobby" for the concession stand of a drive-in theater, the dogs think that the food on the screen is actual size. They arrive at the theater and chaos follows.
| 5a | 5a | "Space Dogs" | Henry Gilroy | Rob Renzetti | October 3, 1993 | 220 |
The dogs climb into a truck, looking for something to eat. It turns out that the truck is delivering the food for storage in the next Space Shuttle to lift off. Once inside, the dogs launch the shuttle into outer space by accident.
| 5b | 5b | "Pie in the Sky" | Lane Raichart | Tuck Tucker | October 3, 1993 | 104 |
The dogs wish to eat at the Pie in the Sky Restaurant, on top of Hollywood's Department Store. The staff look familiar on all the floors they visit.
| 6a | 6a | "A Quarter" | Bobs Gannaway | Tony Craig | October 10, 1993 | 118 |
The dogs pass a pay phone off-hook, and are told by the automatic teller to deposit 25¢. Avoiding being disobedient, the dogs search for a quarter, leading them to a cash machine, a psychiatrist, and a get-rich-quick scheme.
| 6b | 6b | "Red" | Richard Pursel & Lane Raichert | Ash Brannon & Genndy Tartakovsky | October 10, 1993 | 101 |
The dogs meet Red, a parody of Little Red Riding Hood, who is going off to her grandmother's house to give her a basket of goodies. The dogs lead her to the Three Bears' house, where they go through the series of events Goldilocks encounters.
| 7a | 7a | "Substitute Teacher" | Mark Saraceni | Rob Renzetti | October 17, 1993 | 115 |
Kenny's regular teacher is on sick leave due to a nervous breakdown, so Mr. Hollywood substitutes.
| 7b | 7b | "Seeing Eye Dogs" | Bobs Gannaway | Ron Zorman | October 17, 1993 | 205 |
The dogs are sold as guide dogs to Mr. Hollywood, who is rendered temporarily blind after an eye examination. The Big Dog is more concerned with finding a fire hydrant, however, and the Little Dog claims to know the whereabouts of a hidden shortcut, which involves cutting through a construction yard.
| 8a | 8a | "Spooks-a-Poppin'" | Richard Pursel | Tuck Tucker | October 24, 1993 | 112 |
The Little Dog wants to dig up a bone he buried in the "Paws and Reflect" pet cemetery. When he falls into an open grave, his head gets stuck inside of a skull and the Big Dog cowers at the sight of him.
| 8b | 8b | "Sheep Dogs" | Sylvia Edwards | Mauro Casalese | October 24, 1993 | 107 |
The dogs have ended up as sheep dogs on Mr. Hollywood's farm. They must learn how to round up the "dogies" to earn their breakfast.
| 9a | 9a | "Trash Day" | Bobs Gannaway | Tuck Tucker | October 31, 1993 | 209 |
Garbage day comes, to the dogs' delight. As they scrounge through a trash can to look for things, a debate ensues between them when they encounter a toilet seat that the both of them want.
| 9b | 9b | "Hollywood's Ark" | Lane Raichert | Tuck Tucker | October 31, 1993 | 103 |
A parody of the story of Noah's ark, in which Mr. Hollywood plays the part of Noah, who builds his ark and gathers two of every species of animal. When he finds the Big Dog and the Little Dog, the two wreak havoc for Mr. Hollywood and the rest of the animals on board.
| 10a | 10a | "Family Values" | Lane Raichert | Tony Craig | November 7, 1993 | 215 |
The dogs encounter a family having a cookout. When they investigate further, they find the family to be Brady Bunch-esque.
| 10b | 10b | "Red Strikes Back" | Richard Pursel | Ron Zorman | November 7, 1993 | 110 |
The dogs find themselves in another situation where they follow Red. They end up at the witch's house from "Hansel and Gretel". There, they are ordered by the witch to feed Red until she is plump enough to be eaten.
| 11a | 11a | "Stunt Dogs" | Bobs Gannaway | Rob Renzetti | November 14, 1993 | 201 |
The dogs attempt to get into a commercial for dog food so that they can receive free food, but stumble upon the wrong studio set, where a jungle picture is being filmed. Mr. Hollywood, who works there as the stunt double for the lead actor, mistakes the dogs for the stunt doubles for the Jungle King's sidekicks.
| 11b | 11b | "Return of Red" | Richard Pursel & Lane Raichert | Kelly Armstrong | November 14, 1993 | 106 |
The dogs are hungry for Happy Granny brand dog food. It belongs to Red, who is once again off to Grandma's house. Upon arriving at Grandma's, Red interrogates the wolf, while the wolf fights with Granny inside his stomach.
| 12a | 12a | "Far-Out Friday" | Mark Saraceni | Tuck Tucker | November 21, 1993 | 204 |
From out of nowhere, the two dogs switch bodies with each other. Noticing no immediate effects, they set out in search of food, only to find that their new bodies do not jibe with their mentalities.
| 12b | 12b | "Let's Make a Right Price" | Richard Pursel | Joe Suggs | November 21, 1993 | 105 |
The dogs end up as contestants on the show Let's Make a Right Price!!, a parody of The Price Is Right, with host Bill Baker. The losers receive doggie treats, so the Little Dog tries his best to avoid winning the real prizes. The Big Dog is busy flirting with the model.
| 13a | 13a | "Cat!" | Bobs Gannaway | Tony Craig | November 28, 1993 | 206 |
The Big Dog sleeps while the Little Dog is in danger when a cat wanders into their alley and places itself between the two dogs.
| 13b | 13b | "Love Doctors" | Mark Saraceni | Rob Renzetti | November 28, 1993 | 203 |
The dogs hang out with Kenny, who has a crush on Buffy. Kenny is too nervous to approach her, so the dogs attempt to talk to her in his place. The Little Dog misinterprets everything Buffy says, however, leading Kenny on; Buffy then starts playing with Kenny and the dogs, thinking he is their owner.

=== Season 2 (1994–95) ===
| No. overall | No. in season | Title | Directed by | Written by | Storyboard by | Original release date | Prod. code |
|---|---|---|---|---|---|---|---|
| 14 | 1 | "Jerk" | Genndy Tartakovsky | Mark Saraceni & Rob Renzetti | Eddie Fitzgerald | September 5, 1994 | 113 |
The dogs arrive at the Grand Canyon, then try to solve a puzzle. After the Big Dog completes the puzzle, the Little Dog rails against him for not including the word "jerk" in its solution. His voice echoes across the canyon and he misconstrues the echo as another dog who is insulting them.
| 15 | 2 | "Las Pelotas!" | Donovan Cook | Donovan Cook | Donovan Cook | September 12, 1994 | 116 |
The dogs come across a tennis club, where they see tennis balls being served back and forth. The Little Dog wants to join them in order to chew them, but gets overwhelmed by the number of tennis balls lying around.
| 16 | 3 | "Post Office" | Donovan Cook | Bobs Gannaway | Tony Craig | September 19, 1994 | 202 |
The dogs wander onto a line in the post office. Oblivious to the purpose of a post office, the dogs spend all day waiting in line, attacking mail carriers and even enlisting in the Army via the Selective Service System.
| 17 | 4 | "Day Dream" | Rob Renzetti | Rob Renzetti | Rob Renzetti | October 24, 1994 | 208 |
The dogs find a package delivery of ice cream-related products before them when they both wake up. The Little Dog suspects this as too good to be true and that they must be still asleep, so the two of them try to wake themselves up.
| 18 | 5 | "Love" | Donovan Cook, Todd Frederiksen & Miles Thompson | Mark Saraceni | Conrad Vernon | October 31, 1994 | 119 |
The Big Dog falls in love with a hamster displayed in the window of a pet shop, so he and the Little Dog search the store for her. After the salesman, Mr. Hollywood, has shown the dogs around the store, the Big Dog (whose name turns out to be Jonathan) must face the truth about a love that was never meant to be...
| 19 | 6 | "Inside Out" | Tony Craig | Bobs Gannaway | Tony Craig | November 7, 1994 | 217 |
The dogs see a gigantic bone being shipped to a museum and decide to wait for it to come back outside. They wait so still, the movers suspect they are part of another exhibit and take them into the museum too.
| 20 | 7 | "Spit Soup" | Tony Craig | Sylvia Edwards & Mark Saraceni | Ted Mathot | November 14, 1994 | 102 |
In a last ditch effort for some food, the dogs climb a 3D billboard advertisement shaped like a giant bowl of soup. When they find that the bowl is "dry", the Big Dog fills the bowl with his spit. He soon dries out, so the Little Dog must find a way to re-hydrate him.
| 21 | 8 | "Fun!" | Rob Renzetti | Rob Renzetti | Rob Renzetti | November 21, 1994 | 218 |
The dogs find that a new diner near them opens up tomorrow, so they attempt to do fun activities to pass the time before the restaurant opens.
| 22 | 9 | "The Rise and Fall of the Big Dog" | Donovan Cook | Mark Saraceni & Donovan Cook | Teddy Newton | December 5, 1994 | 219 |
The dogs confront a bum in front of the White House. A fight ensues between them, which results in the foreign ambassador and the Big Dog switching occupations; the Big Dog goes off to attend a party at the White House, and the Little Dog (who mistakes the ambassador for the Big Dog) tries to get his friend out from under his "amnesia".
| 23 | 10 | "Cookies, Ookies, Blookies" | Donovan Cook & Tony Craig | Mark Saraceni & Rob Renzetti | Andrew Stanton | December 19, 1994 | 214 |
The dogs wish for some "Fudgie Scout Cookies", but struggle to open the door that stands between them and the Girl Scout who sells them.
| 24 | 11 | "Cartoon Canines" | Tony Craig | Bobs Gannaway | Miles Thompson | January 30, 1995 | 216 |
The dogs enlist in a boot camp that trains cartoon characters to become hardcore animation icons (the Big Dog and the Little Dog are called Loafy and Hammy, respectively).
| 25 | 12 | "Bathroom Humor" | Tony Craig | Zeke Kamm | Todd Frederiksen | February 6, 1995 | 111 |
The Big Dog awakes in the middle of the night wanting to relieve himself. Just as he finds a spot, the Little Dog stops him, making a point that this is their home, so they need to find a more suitable place. They end up inside an indoor bathroom, where hilarity ensues as the Little Dog has to groom the Big Dog up to go to the bathroom like a human.
| 26 | 13 | "Hobo Hounds" | Rob Renzetti | Rob Renzetti | Rob Renzetti | February 13, 1995 | 108 |
The Big Dog and the Little Dog infuse their type of humor into a parody of a silent black-and-white cartoon, in which they must save a young girl from a villainous cat.

== Home media ==
On August 14, 2018, Warner Bros. Home Entertainment (via the Warner Archive Collection) released the first season of the series as 2 Stupid Dogs/Secret Squirrel Show Volume One on DVD.

== Reception ==
Martin "Dr. Toon" Goodman of Animation World Magazine described 2 Stupid Dogs as one of two "clones" of The Ren & Stimpy Show (despite Kricfalusi acting as a consultant on the series), the other one being Disney's The Shnookums & Meat Funny Cartoon Show. The series was nominated for a Daytime Emmy Award but lost to Rugrats.

=== Accolades ===
| Date | Award | Category | Nominee(s) | Result |
|---|---|---|---|---|
| 1994 | Annie Awards | Best Individual Achievement for Artistic Excellence in the Field of Animation | Paul Rudish | Nominated |
| 1994 | Daytime Emmy Awards | Outstanding Film Sound Mixing | Rex Slinkard and James L Aicholtz | Nominated |
| 1995 | Daytime Emmy Awards | Outstanding Achievement in Animation | Todd Frederiksen, Miles Thompson, Tony Craig, Mark Saraceni, Rob Renzetti, and Donovan Cook | Nominated |

== See also ==
- List of works produced by Hanna-Barbera Productions
- List of Hanna-Barbera characters
- The Ren & Stimpy Show
- Cow and Chicken
