= TerrorVision =

1986 film by Ted Nicolaou

- Theatrical release poster
- Directed by: Ted Nicolaou
- Written by: Charles Band; Ted Nicolaou
- Produced by: Albert Band; Charles Band; Debra Dion
- Starring: Diane Franklin; Gerrit Graham; Mary Woronov; Chad Allen; Jonathan Gries; Jennifer Richards; Alejandro Rey; Bert Remsen
- Cinematography: Romano Albani
- Edited by: Thomas Meshelski
- Music by: Richard Band; The Fibonaccis
- Production company: Empire Pictures
- Distributed by: Empire Pictures
- Release date: February 14, 1986 (United States)
- Running time: 83 min.
- Country: United States
- Language: English
- Box office: $320,256

TerrorVision is a 1986 American science fiction horror comedy film directed by Ted Nicolaou, produced and written by Albert and Charles Band and composed by Richard Band, all of whom went on to found and work with Full Moon Features in 1989. TerrorVision was made by Empire International Pictures, the production company owned by Charles Band prior to Full Moon, and was released in February 1986.

The story follows an alien creature sent to Earth, which ends up inside a household where three kids must take care of it to prevent it from going into a hungry rampage. While not a critical or commercial success, it later developed as a cult film, particularly a "so bad it's good" film.

== Plot ==
On an alien planet named Pluton, an alien garbage disposal converts a monstrous mutant called a Hungry Beast into energy and beams it into space. Meanwhile, on Earth, the Putterman family is getting satellite television, courtesy of a temperamental DIY satellite antenna. The reception is poor at first, but suddenly strengthens when a bolt of the alien energy hits the dish.

Sherman Putterman and his ex-military, survivalist grandfather set out to enjoy a night of horror films hosted by the buxom Medusa. Meanwhile, Sherman's parents go out to meet some swingers and his sister Suzy goes out with her rocker boyfriend O.D. Sherman and his grandfather eventually fall asleep, but are awakened when the Hungry Beast materializes out of the TV and eats the grandfather. Sherman's parents later arrive along with swingers Cherry and Spiro. Despite Sherman's plea, his mother locks him in the fallout shelter so he will not ruin their evening.

Sherman tries calling the police, but they take him to be a prank caller. He also calls Medusa, but she dismisses him as a psychotic. Later, the Beast travels through the television into the house's sex-themed "Pleasure Dome", eats Cherry, and imitates her to lure Spiro. Sherman's parents also get eaten after they discover the remains of the swingers. Sherman uses some plastic explosive to break out of the bunker as O.D. and his sister arrive.

Sherman's sister does not believe his story about a monster, and when they check their parents' room, they find imitations of them, their grandfather and the swingers. Soon after though, they encounter the Beast in another room. It chases after them, but relents at the sight of O.D.'s heavy metal paraphernalia, which he finds appealing due to its resemblance of his caretaker's gloves. They then discover that they can subdue the Beast with food and television, and teach it a few words such as "TV", "music" and their names. They consider using the Beast for profit, and call Medusa in the hope of securing a TV appearance. She is initially dismissive, but shows interest when they promise to hold a party.

However, the Beast becomes enraged and eats O.D. when its alien captor appears on the TV to warn the earthlings that they must destroy their television equipment to prevent the Beast from spreading; The alien had overreacted to the announcement from Pluthar, the alien captor, and O.D. provoked the monster in an attempt to calm it down. A police officer arrives to arrest Sherman for the prank calls only to be eaten by the Beast. Sherman breaks all the TVs he can find, and eventually Pluthar appears through the television to exterminate the Beast. Medusa arrives at the house and kills Pluthar, mistakenly believing that he is in fact the Beast that Sherman and Suzy have described to her. When the real monster arrives, it sucks the group of three into its mouth with a powerful gust of air.

The next morning, Medusa's chauffeur is woken up by a crude imitation of his employer hiding in the back seat of his car, demanding to be taken to the TV station.

== Cast ==
- Chad Allen as Sherman Putterman
- Diane Franklin as Suzy Putterman
- Mary Woronov as Raquel Putterman
- Gerrit Graham as Stanley Putterman
- Bert Remsen as Grampa Putterman
- Jon Gries as O.D.
- Jennifer Richards as Medusa
- Alejandro Rey as Spiro
- Randi Brooks as Cherry
- Frank Welker as Hungry Beast Alien (voice)
- Ian Patrick Williams as Officer Nutky
- Sonny Carl Davis as Norton
- William Paulson as Pluthar
- John Leamer as the Chauffeur

== Production ==
The film was shot back-to-back with Empire Pictures' Troll in Italy, at the Stabilimenti Cinematografici Pontini studios near Rome. Many of the same crew worked on both productions, including creature effects designer John Carl Buechler (who also directed Troll), cinematographer Romano Albani, and composer Richard Band. The two films were released a month apart from each other in the United States.

== Release ==
The film was given a limited release theatrically in the United States by Empire Pictures in February 1986. It grossed $320,256 at the box office.

In 2007, Metro-Goldwyn-Mayer released a widescreen version of the film on Showtime.

In 2012, Shout! Factory announced that they would be releasing the film on DVD and Blu-ray as part of their Scream Factory lineup. A DVD/Blu-ray double feature of TerrorVision/The Video Dead was released in February 2013.

== Soundtrack ==
The soundtrack to the film was originally released on vinyl by Restless Records in 1986. It was reissued in 2017 on CD by Intrada Records.

In addition to Richard Band's original score, several songs (including the movie's theme) were contributed by Los Angeles art rock band The Fibonaccis. TerrorVision was hoped to bring more attention to the group, but the movie (and ultimately the soundtrack) failed.

Tracklist:

1. "TerrorVision" - The Fibonaccis
2. "The Friends of Crime" - The Fibonaccis
3. "Sack of Suit Suite" - The Fibonaccis
4. "Advice to a Mutant" - The Fibonaccis
5. "He Can't Stop Laughing" - The Fibonaccis
6. Space Garbage
7. Norton's Theme
8. The Monster Materializes
9. Gramps Bites the Big One
10. Pluthar and the Kids
11. Monster Attacks Sherman
12. Spiro Gets Giacuzzed
13. Bomb Shelter
14. Officer Nupky's Bad Timing
15. Susie and Sherman
16. Good Morning All

== Reception ==
Janet Maslin of The New York Times wrote: "The film's style is so smugly stupid that it's hard to tell whether the creatures, dripping with primordial ooze, are any less attractive than the Puttermans" and also called the film "noisly [sic] campy without being the least bit clever." Variety dismissed it as "an uninvolving sci-fi thriller comedy that relies heavily for its shock value on gooey monster effects rather than cinematic finesse ... With the apparent intent of making some comments about our unnatural reliance on television, and technology in general, filmmakers have perhaps bit off too much." Writing in the Chicago Tribune, Rick Kogan gave the film one star out of four and called it "a certifiably bad movie" with "a good deal that is distasteful," but also found it "strangely likable" because Nicolaou "has done a better job than most who have tackled this particular beat. He has a nice feel for pacing if not for tension, a good eye for detail if often excessive and an occasional burst of humor."

Patrick Goldstein of the Los Angeles Times wrote, "There are a few wonderful moments scattered throughout the picture, clearly the kind of goofy monster mash that should be seen long after midnight when your brain is operating at half-speed ... But to mix up the gross-outs with gags you need a good curve ball — the jokes should have a real spin to them. That weird comic rhythm is missing here. In fact, Nicolaou has such a terrible sense of timing that the scenes drag on long after every laugh has been squeezed dry." David Maine of Pop Matters called "TerrorVision "a truly wretched movie."

On review aggregator website Rotten Tomatoes, TerrorVision holds an approval rating of 10% based on ten reviews.
