= Dragonworld: The Legend Continues =

- Directed by: Ted Nicolaou
- Written by: Ted Nicolaou
- Produced by: Robert Bernacchi; Vlad Paunescu
- Starring: Drake Bell; Richard Trask; Andrew Keir; James Ellis; Tina Martin; Judith Paris
- Cinematography: Vlad Paunescu
- Edited by: Gregory Sanders
- Music by: Richard Kosinski; William Levine
- Production companies: The Kushner-Locke Company; Castel Film Romania
- Distributed by: Full Moon Features; Paramount Pictures; Tango Entertainment (2005 USA/Canada Release)
- Release dates: 18 April 1999 (United Kingdom); 17 August 1999 (U.S., Canada)
- Running time: 78 minutes
- Countries: United States; United Kingdom; Romania
- Language: English

Dragonworld: The Legend Continues, also known as Dragonworld II and originally released on VHS in North America as Shadow of the Knight, is a 1999 Adventure fantasy film. It is a direct-to-video sequel to the original 1994 film, Dragonworld. The film was actually originally filmed in 1996, but did not see a release until 1999. Andrew Keir is the only cast member to reprise his role as Angus McGowan from the original film, and it's the last film that he has acted in, during the 1996 production, before his death in 1997; this film is dedicated to him in memory.

== Plot ==
The film bears little relation to the first film. Johnny McGowan and his only true friend, Yowler, who is the last dragon on Earth, are in serious trouble. The Dark Knight, MacClain, who is the enemy of the Dragon race, has returned and is determined to slay Yowler, in order to obtain the magical powers inside the dragon's blood to bring a new evil age of darkness upon the planet. John begins a new quest to protect Yowler, defeat MacClain and save the world for all future generations.

== Cast ==
- Drake Bell as Johnny McGowan
- Richard Trask as Yowler the Dragon
- Andrew Keir as Angus McGowan
- James Ellis as McCoy
- Tina Martin as Mrs. Cosgrove
- Judith Paris as Mrs. Churchill
- Constantin Barbulescu as MacClain
- Avram Besoiu as Kimison
- Julius Liptac as Kimison #1 (credited as Iulius Liptac)
- Cezar Boghina as Kimison #2
- Mihai Verbintschi as Kimison #3 (credited as Mihai Verbitchi)
- Gheorghe Flonda as Mob 1
- Dan Glasu as Mob 2
- Ovidiu Mot as Mob 3

== Development ==
The film was produced in 1996 and the film locations were centered at Castel Film Studios of Bucharest, Romania.

== Reception ==
The film has mainly received negative reviews, upon critics, compared to the original film. Rotten Tomatoes currently holds a 36% score of this film. The film has been panned for its poor directing, poor storyline, poor acting and poor designed special effects, especially with Yowler, who was played by Richard Trask in a Dragon suit, giving the film a poor design reaction towards Critics.
