= Leapin' Leprechauns! =

1995 film by Ted Nicolaou

- VHS artwork.
- Directed by: Ted Nicolaou
- Written by: Charles Band (original idea); Michael McGann and Ted Nicolaou (screenplay)
- Produced by: Oana Paunescu; Vlad Paunescu
- Starring: Gregory Smith; John Bluthal; Ray Bright
- Cinematography: Adolfo Bartoli
- Edited by: Gregory Sanders
- Music by: Richard Kosinski; William Levine; John Zeretzke
- Production companies: Full Moon Entertainment; Moonbeam Entertainment
- Distributed by: Paramount Home Video
- Release date: July 26, 1995
- Running time: 84 min.
- Country: United States
- Language: English

Leapin' Leprechauns! is a 1995 American fantasy film, starring Andrew Smith, John Bluthal and Ray Bright. It was directed by Ted Nicolaou.

== Plot ==
A man tries to prevent the building of a theme park on top of a land that is home to the Leprechauns.

== Cast ==
- John Bluthal as Michael Dennehy
- Grant Cramer as John Dennehy
- Sharon Lee Jones as Sarah Dennehy
- Gregory Smith as Mikey Dennehy
- Erica Hess as Melanie Dennehy
- James Ellis as Patrick
- Sylvester McCoy as Flynn
- Godfrey James as King Kevin, of The Leprechauns
- Tina Martin as Queen Maeve, of The Fairies
- Andrew Smith as Andrew
- Ray Bright as Andrew's Father
- Madeleine Potter as Morgan de la Fey / Nula (uncredited)

== Production ==
The movie was filmed back-to-back with its sequel Spellbreaker: Secret of the Leprechauns (1996). It was filmed mostly in Romania.

== Reception ==
Leapin' Leprechauns received mostly unfavorable reviews from critics. The lack of a clear storyline and an "all-out villain" were appointed by many experts as critique points. Felix Vasquez from Cinema Crazed stated: Leapin' Leprechauns! "is not the worst movie I’ve ever seen, but it’s probably the most baffling I’ve seen in a good while. The film takes literally a half hour to get the actual plot in motion, and we spend about twenty long minutes on a leprechaun council meeting where the leprechauns and fairies argue and bicker non-stop. As for a villain of the piece, we don’t meet the evil menace until there’s only ten minutes left in the actual movie. I couldn’t understand why the villain was introduced before the credits actually began, but the writers fails to muster up an interesting bad guy". For MonsterHunt "Leapin' Leprechauns! is as unambitious as the leprechauns’ use of their magic powers and so pedestrian in every thing it attempts that if old King Kevin popped out of my garbage giving me three wishes, my first wish would be that I never saw or heard of this movie. My second wish would be the same just as a backup in case for some reason the first wish failed. And my third wish? Talking dog. Duh. I'm not wasting them all!". TV Guide was optimistic with the lack of an "all-out villain ", but criticized the poor visual effects: "The lack of an all-out villain makes LEAPIN' LEPRECHAUNS! a nice change from the usual routine of live-action family films, though cut-rate special effects limit the title figures in their interaction with other characters".

== Sequels ==
A sequel called Spellbreaker: Secret of the Leprechauns was released direct-to-video in 1996.
