= The Etruscan Mask =

- Directed by: Ted Nicolaou
- Written by: Story; Roberto Bessi; Screenplay; Ted Nicolaou
- Produced by: Roberto Bessi; Antonio Guadalupi; Ladis Zanini
- Starring: Majlinda Agaj; Piero Passatore; Christopher Jones; Andrea Redavid
- Distributed by: Beyond International
- Release date: 2007
- Countries: United States; Italy
- Languages: English; Italian

The Etruscan Mask is a supernatural horror movie written and directed by Ted Nicolaou. Shot in Italy in 2006, the film was released in 2007.

== Plot ==
In the unique city of Siena, Italy, five foreign university students stumble across an ancient Etruscan mask. After a series of unexplainable events, it becomes clear that the mask must be destroyed. However, one of the students has already succumbed to its powers and in doing so has released an ancient demon which has no intention of being destroyed.

== Cast ==
- Majlinda Agaj ... Jude
- Ulla Alasjarvi ... Minerva
- Maylis Iturbide ... Aurora
- Cristopher Jones ... Father Cristopher
- Alex Nicolaou ... Stanton
- Piero Ali Passatore ... Mark (as Piero Passatore)
- Andrea Redavid ... Speed

== Production ==
The film was shot in Siena and Turin.

== Reception ==
The movie won the Best Film Prize at the 2007 edition of the International Horror And Fantasy Film Festival in Estepona.
