= The Doors (film) =

1991 biographical film directed by Oliver Stone

- Theatrical release poster
- Directed by: Oliver Stone
- Written by: J. Randal Johnson; Oliver Stone
- Produced by: Bill Graham; Sasha Harari; Mario Kassar; A. Kitman Ho
- Starring: Val Kilmer; Meg Ryan; Kevin Dillon; Kyle MacLachlan; Frank Whaley; Michael Madsen; Billy Idol; Kathleen Quinlan
- Cinematography: Robert Richardson
- Edited by: David Brenner; Joe Hutshing
- Music by: The Doors
- Production companies: Bill Graham Films; Carolco Pictures; Imagine Entertainment; Ixtlan; Le Studio Canal+
- Distributed by: Tri-Star Pictures
- Release date: March 1, 1991
- Running time: 141 minutes
- Country: United States
- Language: English
- Budget: $32 million
- Box office: $34.4 million (US/Canada)

The Doors is a 1991 American biographical psychological musical film directed by Oliver Stone, who also co-wrote the film with J. Randall Jahnson. The film is based on the history of American rock band the Doors and their influence on music and counterculture. The film stars Val Kilmer as singer Jim Morrison, Meg Ryan as Morrison's girlfriend Pamela Courson, Kyle MacLachlan as keyboardist Ray Manzarek, Frank Whaley as lead guitarist Robby Krieger, Kevin Dillon as drummer John Densmore, Billy Idol as Cat, and Kathleen Quinlan as journalist Patricia Kennealy.

The film portrays Morrison as a larger-than-life icon of 1960s rock and roll and counterculture, including portrayals of Morrison's recreational drug use, free love, hippie lifestyle, alcoholism, interest in hallucinogenic drugs as entheogens, and his growing obsession with death, presented as threads which weave in and out of the film.

Produced by Bill Graham Films, Carolco Pictures, Imagine Entertainment, Ixtlan, and Le Studio Canal+, and released by Tri-Star Pictures on March 1, 1991, The Doors grossed $34.4 million in the United States and Canada on a $32 million production budget. The film received mixed reviews from critics; while Kilmer's performance, the supporting cast, the cinematography, the production design and Stone's directing were praised, criticism was centered on its historical inaccuracy and depiction of Morrison.

== Plot ==
In 1949, young Jim Morrison and his family are traveling on a desert highway in New Mexico where they encounter an auto wreck and see an elderly Native American dying by the roadside. In 1965, Jim arrives in California and is assimilated into the Venice Beach culture. During his tenure studying at UCLA, he meets Pamela Courson and they fall in love, becoming a couple. He also meets Ray Manzarek for the first time, as well as Robby Krieger and John Densmore, who form the Doors with Morrison.

Jim convinces his bandmates to travel to Death Valley and experience the effects of psychedelic drugs. Returning to Los Angeles, they play several shows at the famous Whisky a Go Go nightclub and develop a rabid fanbase. Jim's onstage antics and lewd performance of the group's song "The End" upset the club's owners, and the band is ejected from the venue. After the show, they are approached by producer Paul A. Rothchild and Jac Holzman of Elektra Records and are offered a deal to record their first album. The Doors are soon invited to perform on The Ed Sullivan Show, only to be told by one of the producers that they must change the lyric "girl we couldn't get much higher" in the song "Light My Fire", due to a reference to drugs. Despite this, Morrison performs the original lyric during the live broadcast and the band is not allowed to perform on the show again.

As the Doors' success continues, Jim becomes increasingly infatuated with his own image as "The Lizard King" and develops an addiction to alcohol and drugs. Jim becomes intimate with rock journalist Patricia Kennealy, who involves him in her witchcraft activities, participating in a mystical handfasting ceremony. Meanwhile, an elder spirit watches these events.

The rest of the band grows weary of Jim's missed recording sessions and absences at concerts. Jim arrives late and intoxicated at a Miami, Florida concert, becoming increasingly confrontational towards the audience and threatening to expose himself onstage. The incident is a low point for the band, resulting in criminal charges against Jim, cancellations of shows, breakdowns in Jim's personal relationships, and resentment from the other band members.

In 1970, following a lengthy trial, Jim is found guilty of indecent exposure and ordered to serve time in prison. However, he is allowed to remain free on bail, pending the results of an appeal. Patricia tells Jim that she is pregnant with his child, but Jim convinces her to have an abortion. Jim visits his bandmates for the final time, attending a birthday party hosted by Ray where he wishes the band luck in their future endeavors and gives each of them a copy of his poetry book An American Prayer. As Jim plays in the front garden with the children, he sees that one of them is his childhood self and comments, "This is the strangest life I've ever known" (a lyric from the Doors song "Waiting for the Sun"), before passing out.

In 1971, Jim and Pam move to Paris, France, to escape the pressures of the L.A. lifestyle. On the evening of July 3, Pam finds Jim dead in the bathtub of their apartment. He is buried at Père Lachaise Cemetery, beside other famous figures as Oscar Wilde, Marcel Proust and Moliere. Pam also dies three years later at the age of 27.

== Cast ==
- Val Kilmer as Jim Morrison
  - Sean Stone as young Jim
- Meg Ryan as Pamela Courson
- Kyle MacLachlan as Ray Manzarek
- Frank Whaley as Robby Krieger
- Kevin Dillon as John Densmore
- Michael Wincott as Paul A. Rothchild
- Michael Madsen as Tom Baker
- Josh Evans as Bill Siddons
- Dennis Burkley as Dog
- Billy Idol as Cat
- Kathleen Quinlan as Patricia Kennealy
- Crispin Glover as Andy Warhol
- Kelly Hu as Dorothy Manzarek
- John Capodice as Jerry
- Patricia Kennealy-Morrison as Celtic Pagan priestess
- Costas Mandylor as Italian Count
- Debi Mazar as Whiskey girl
- Mimi Rogers as Gloria Stavers, magazine photographer
- Jennifer Rubin as Edie Sedgwick
- Jerry Sturm and Gretchen Becker as Mr. and Mrs. Morrison
- Floyd Westerman as a Native American Spirit
- Paul Williams as Warhol PR agent
- Christina Fulton as Nico
- Mark Moses as Jac Holzman
- Eric Burdon in a cameo appearance in the London Fog
- Paul A. Rothchild in a cameo appearance in the London Fog
- Sky Saxon in a cameo appearance in the Whisky a Go Go
- Oliver Stone as UCLA film professor
- Bruce MacVittie as UCLA Student
- Peter Crombie as Associate Lawyer
- Charlie Spradling as CBS Girl Backstage
- John Densmore as John Haeny, studio engineer
- William Kunstler as Jim's lawyer
- Josie Bissett as Robby Krieger's Girlfriend
- Wes Studi as Indian in Desert
- Titus Welliver as Macing Cop

== Production ==
=== Development ===
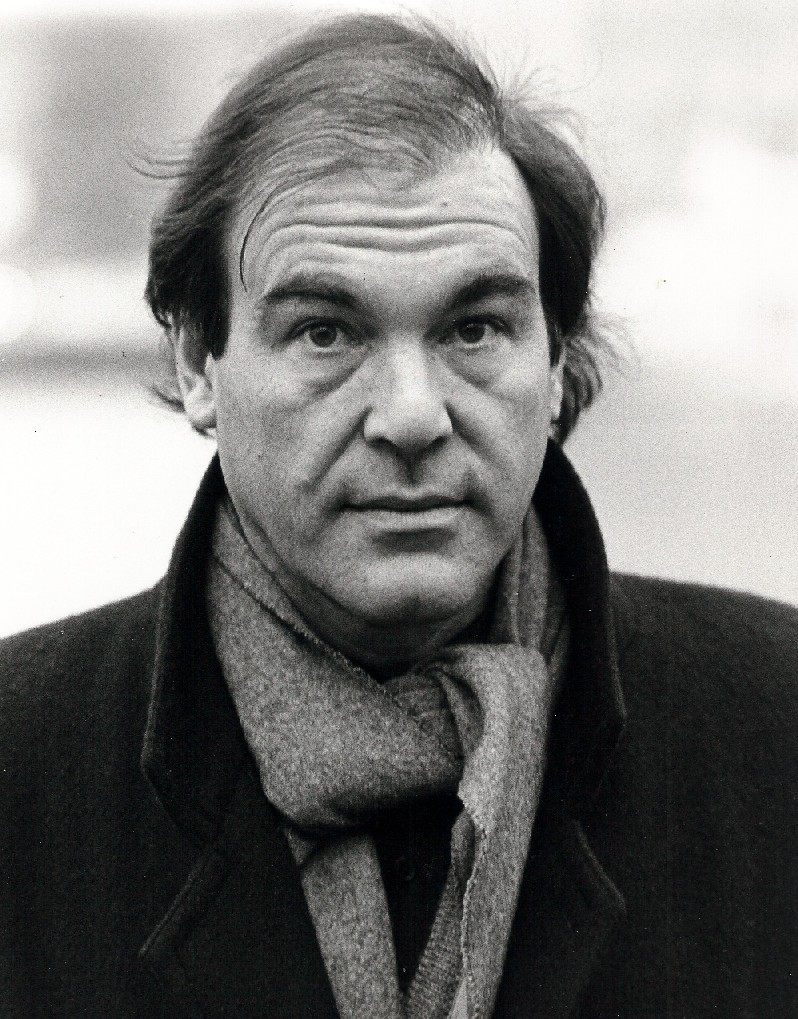
After numerous attempts by other directors, Oliver Stone signed on to direct the film

Several film directors, including Quentin Tarantino, Francis Ford Coppola, Aaron Russo, Jerry Weintraub, Brian De Palma, Jonathan Taplin, Irving Azoff, Martin Scorsese and William Friedkin had all flirted with or been approached about making a Doors biopic over the years. In 1985, Columbia Pictures acquired the rights from the Doors and the Morrison estate to make a film. Producer Sasha Harari wanted filmmaker Oliver Stone to write the screenplay but never heard back from his agent. After two unsatisfactory scripts were produced, Imagine Films replaced Columbia. Harari contacted Stone again and the director met with the surviving band members, telling them he wanted to keep a particularly wild scene from one of the early drafts. The group was offended by this and exercised their right of approval over the director, rejecting Stone.

By 1989, Mario Kassar and Andrew Vajna, who owned Carolco Pictures, had acquired the rights to the project and wanted Stone to direct it. The Doors had seen Stone's film Platoon (1986) and were impressed with what he had done, and Stone agreed to make the film after his next project, Evita. After spending years working on Evita and courting both Madonna and Meryl Streep to play the titular role, the film fell apart over salary negotiations with Streep and Stone quickly moved into pre-production for The Doors. Stone was announced to direct the project in January 1990.

Guitarist Robby Krieger had always opposed a Doors biopic until Stone signed on to direct. Conversely, keyboardist Ray Manzarek had traditionally been the biggest advocate of immortalizing the band on film but opposed Stone's involvement. He was not happy with the direction that Stone was going to take with the film and refused to give his approval. According to actor Kyle MacLachlan, "I know that he and Oliver weren't speaking. I think it was hard for Ray, he being the keeper of the Doors myth for so long". According to Krieger, "when the Doors broke up Ray had his idea of how the band should be portrayed and John and I had ours". Manzarek stated that he was not asked to consult on the film and wanted it to be about all four band members equally, rather than the focus being on Morrison. Conversely, Stone stated that he repeatedly tried to get Manzarek involved, but "all he did was rave and shout. He went on for three hours about his point of view ... I didn't want Ray to be dominant, but Ray thought he knew better than anybody else". Krieger claimed in his book Set the Night on Fire that Manzarek was also jealous of Stone because he wanted to direct the film himself.

=== Screenplay ===
Stone first heard the Doors in 1967, when he was a 21-year-old soldier in Vietnam. Before filming started, Stone and his producers had to negotiate with the three surviving band members and their label, Elektra Records, as well as the parents of both Morrison and his girlfriend Pamela Courson. Morrison's parents would only allow themselves to be depicted in a dream-like flashback sequence at the beginning of the film. The Coursons wanted there to be no suggestion in any way that Pamela caused Morrison's death. Stone found the Coursons the most difficult to deal with because they wanted Pamela to be portrayed as "an angel". While researching the film, Stone read through transcripts of interviews with over 100 people. Stone finally penned the film script in the summer of 1989, later stating that "The Doors script was always problematic. Even when we shot, but the music helped fuse it together". Stone first picked the songs he wanted to use and then wrote "each piece of the movie as a mood to fit that song". The Coursons did not like Stone's script and tried to slow the production down by refusing to allow any of Morrison's later poetry to be used in the film. When Morrison died, Courson acquired the rights to Morrison's poetry; when she died, her parents got the rights.

=== Casting ===
For nearly 10 years prior to production, the project went through development hell after being considered by many studios and directors. Several actors, including Tom Cruise, Johnny Depp, Timothy Hutton, Steven Bauer, Gregory Harrison, Christopher Lambert, Michael Ontkean, Jason Patric, John Travolta and Richard Gere, were each considered for the role of Morrison when the project was still in development in over the years, with Bono of U2 and Michael Hutchence of INXS also expressing interest in the role. Stone initially offered the role to Ian Astbury of the Cult, who declined the role because he was not happy with the way Morrison was going to be represented in the film.

When Stone began talking about the project in 1988, he had Val Kilmer in mind to play Morrison, after seeing him in the Ron Howard fantasy film Willow. Kilmer had the same kind of singing voice as Morrison and, to convince Stone that he was right for the role, spent several thousand dollars of his own money and made his own eight-minute audition video, singing and looking like Morrison at various stages of his life. To prepare for the role, Kilmer lost weight and spent six months rehearsing Doors songs every day; the actor learned 50 songs, 15 of which are actually performed in the film. Kilmer also spent hundreds of hours with the Doors' producer Paul A. Rothchild, who related "anecdotes, stories, tragic moments, humorous moments, how Jim thought ... interpretation of Jim's lyrics". Rothchild also took Kilmer into the studio and helped him with "some pronunciations, idiomatic things that Jim would do that made the song sound like Jim". Kilmer also met with Krieger and Densmore but Manzarek refused to talk to him. When the Doors heard Kilmer singing they could not tell whether the voice was Kilmer's or Morrison's.

Stone auditioned approximately 60 actresses for the role of Pamela Courson. The role required nudity and the script featured sex scenes, which generated a fair amount of controversy. Casting director Risa Bramon felt that Patricia Arquette auditioned very well and should have gotten the role. Jennifer Tilly auditioned for the role and recalled the audition process in a 2025 Twitter post in tribute to Kilmer: "A long time ago, I was auditioning for the movie The Doors. It was kind of a cattle call. They paired together potential Jims with potential Pamelas. And they were running behind so we were spilling out of the casting office, sitting on the porch, the lawn, and the driveway. All of a sudden, a ’60s convertible came screeching up, blaring Doors music at top volume. And a guy jumped out and strode inside: He had wild hair and he was barefoot, shirtless and wearing nothing but a pair of tight leather pants. We all looked at each other like… Who is this guy? We were more than a little shook by the sheer audacity of his entrance. Well, of course, it was Val Kilmer and from that minute on, nobody else stood a chance". Tilly ended up playing a groupie called "Okie girl", but her scenes were deleted from the final cut.

Meg Ryan was cast as Courson. To prepare for the role, she talked to the Coursons and people that knew Pamela. Before doing the film, she was not familiar with Morrison and "liked a few songs", adding, "I had to reexamine all my beliefs about [the 1960s] in order to do this movie". In doing research, she also encountered several conflicting views of Pamela.

Krieger acted as a technical advisor on the film, chiefly to show his cinematic alter ego, Frank Whaley, where to put his fingers on the guitar fretboard during the mimed performance sequences. Similarly, Densmore also acted as a consultant on the film, tutoring Kevin Dillon.

=== Filming ===
With a budget set at $32 million, The Doors was filmed over 13 weeks, predominantly in and around Los Angeles, California; Paris, France; New York City, New York; and the Mojave Desert. Stone originally hired Paula Abdul to choreograph the film's concert scenes. She dropped out of the project because she did not understand Morrison's on-stage actions and was not familiar with the time period. Abdul recommended Bill and Jacqui Landrum, who watched hours of concert footage before working with Kilmer and got him to do dance exercises to loosen up his upper body and jumping routines to develop his stamina.

During the concert scenes, Kilmer did his own singing, performing over the Doors' master tapes without Morrison's lead vocals, avoiding lip-synching. Kilmer shared his audition tape, his preparation and some behind-the-scenes footage of the film in the 2021 documentary Val. Kilmer's endurance was put to the test during the concert sequences, which took several days to film, with Stone stating, "His voice would start to deteriorate after two or three takes. We had to take that into consideration." One sequence, filmed inside the Whisky a Go Go, proved to be more difficult than others due to all the smoke and sweat, a result of the body heat and intense camera lights. "The End" sequence took five days to shoot, after which Kilmer was completely exhausted. Kilmer and Ryan were picking glass out of their knees between takes while filming one of their characters' fight scenes, Kilmer recalled: "How we dealt with it was just with a lot of humor and sensitivity. We were very dependent on each other in that sensitive state which you have to live in when you're inside someone else's life."

Kilmer described the film saying; "Ultimately, the movie isn't about the '60s. It isn't about the Doors. It isn't even about Jim Morrison. It's about fame. That's the line that Oliver chose to hang it on. In my feeble way, I've been trying not to suffer those pains." Kilmer was so immersed into the role of Jim Morrison that he had to go to therapy after he finished filming in order to recover properly.

Controversy arose during filming when a memo linked to Kilmer circulated among cast and crew members, listing rules of how the actor was to be treated for the duration of principal photography. These provisions forbade people to approach him on set without good reason, address him by his own name while he was in character or stare at him on set. An upset Stone contacted Kilmer's agent and the actor claimed it was a misunderstanding and that the memo was for his own people and not the film crew.

=== Soundtrack ===
The film contains over two dozen of the Doors' songs, although only half of these appear on the accompanying soundtrack album. In the film, original recordings of the band are combined with vocal performances by Kilmer himself, although none of Kilmer's performances appear on the soundtrack album. In addition, two songs by the Velvet Underground ("Heroin" and "Venus in Furs") are heard throughout the film, with the former appearing on the soundtrack.

== Historical inaccuracies ==
It's not Jim Morrison. It's Oliver Stone in leather pants.

— Ray Manzarek, dismissing the film's portrayal of Morrison.

The film is based mostly on real people and actual events, with some segments reflecting Stone's vision and dramatization of those people and events. For example, when Morrison is asked to change the lyric in "Light My Fire" for his appearance on The Ed Sullivan Show, he is depicted as blatantly ignoring the request, defiantly shouting "Higher! Yeah!" into the television camera. However, during the actual broadcast, Morrison simply sang the vocal with the same emphasis as on the record. Morrison later said the inclusion of "higher" in the live version was an accident, and that he had meant to change the lyric but was so nervous about performing on live television that he forgot. Conversely, Ray Manzarek said the Doors only pretended to agree to the changing of words and deliberately played the song as they always had, albeit without any added emphasis on the offending words.

Several acts of violence portrayed in the film are disputed: Morrison is depicted as locking Pamela Courson in a closet and setting it on fire; having an argument with Courson at a Thanksgiving celebration, where they both threaten each other with a knife; and angrily throwing a television set at Manzarek for licensing the use of "Light My Fire" in a Buick television commercial. Even though Manzarek was frank about Morrison's tendency to go into senseless rages, participants in the film agree that none of these specific incidents occurred. Stone acknowledges in the DVD director's commentary that the Thanksgiving scene never actually took place, nor the scene when the band members travel to a desert where Morrison encourages them to take psychedelic drugs.

Dialogue that took place between Morrison and Patricia Kennealy is misrepresented in scenes between Morrison and Pam Courson, with Courson speaking Kennealy's words. Courson is also depicted as saying hostile things to Kennealy, when by Kennealy's reports the interactions between the two women were polite. Kennealy is also portrayed as being the girl Morrison was with in the shower stall backstage before the December 9, 1967 New Haven concert (not 1968 as noted in the film), when in fact he was with a local teenage co-ed from Southern Connecticut State University. Additionally, the New Haven venue is presented in the film as an amphitheater with a large balcony and a packed audience, when in reality it was a rather decrepit, half-empty hockey rink with audience members sitting on folding wooden chairs. In the scene at a press conference set in New York City in 1967, when Kennealy is first introduced to Morrison, the singer is asked a question regarding "the dreadful reviews your new poetry book has got"; at that time, Morrison had not yet published any volumes of his poetry.

John Densmore is portrayed as hating Morrison when the singer's personal and drug problems begin to dominate his behavior. However, Densmore states in his biography Riders on the Storm that he never directly confronted Morrison about his drunken behavior.

In the concert sequences naked women are shown prancing around onstage, which Densmore said did not happen at any of the Doors' concerts. Krieger said that he did not take acid prior to the concert at the Dinner Key Auditorium in Miami on March 1, 1969, as depicted in the film.

The surviving Doors members were all, to one degree or another, unhappy with the final film but still praised Kilmer's performance. In a 1991 interview with Gary James, Manzarek criticized Stone for exaggerating Morrison's alcohol consumption: "Jim with a bottle all the time. It was ridiculous ... It was not about Jim Morrison. It was about Jimbo Morrison, the drunk. God, where was the sensitive poet and the funny guy? The guy I knew was not on that screen." In the afterword of his book Riders on the Storm, Densmore says that the movie is based on "the myth of Jim Morrison" and criticizes the film for portraying Morrison's ideas as "muddled through the haze of the drink [alcohol]". In a 1991 interview, Krieger said that Kilmer did a good job portraying Morrison and that "it was scary sometimes how much he was like Jim". In a 1994 interview, Krieger said that the film does not give the viewer "any kind of understanding of what made Jim Morrison tick". Krieger added, "They left a lot of stuff out. Some of it was overblown, but a lot of the stuff was very well done, I thought."

In a 2015 interview with Forbes, Densmore said that Manzarek wanted to direct the film at one point before Stone, and he was trying to tell Stone how to make the movie and was not allowed on set for a while. Densmore said that Manzarek did not want the film to show Morrison's darker side, to which Densmore recalled: "Well, that's ludicrous. Maybe Oliver focused quite a bit on that, but I love him for giving it a go. I think Val Kilmer should have been nominated for an Oscar. He gave me the creeps on the set - he was so close to Jim. Actors, they're weird. They transform their bodies." Densmore added that his only regret about the film is that it wasn't more about the times, the sixties. "Oliver chose the tortured artist, a valid storyline probably not dissimilar to stuff jangling around in Mr. Stone's head", he said.

In Manzarek's biography of the Doors, Light My Fire, he often criticizes Stone and his account of Morrison. For example, in Stone's re-creation of Morrison's student film at UCLA, Morrison watches a D-Day sequence on television and shouts profanities in German, with a near-nude German exchange student dancing on top of the television sporting a swastika armband. According to Manzarek, the only similarity between Stone's version and Morrison's was that the girl in question was German. Manzarek described Stone's version as a "grotesque exaggeration", and recalled that Morrison's film was a "much lighter, much friendlier, much funnier kind of thing".

As the credits point out and as Stone emphasizes in his DVD commentary, some characters, names, and incidents in the film are fictitious or amalgamations of real people. In the 1997 documentary, The Road of Excess, Stone states that Quinlan's character, Patricia Kennealy, is a composite, and in retrospect should have been given a fictitious name. Kennealy was hurt by her portrayal in the film and objected to a scene where Morrison states that he did not take their handfasting ceremony seriously. Kennealy is credited as a "Wiccan priestess" for her cameo role as the priestess who married the real Jim and Patricia, but the real priestess was a Celtic pagan.

The former Doors said the depiction of Pamela Courson is not accurate at all, as their book The Doors describes this version of Courson as "a cartoon of a girlfriend". Courson's parents had inherited Morrison's poems when their daughter died, and Stone had to agree to restrictions about his portrayal of her in exchange for the rights to use the poetry. In particular, Stone agreed to avoid any suggestion that Courson may have been responsible for Morrison's death. However, Alain Ronay and Courson herself had both said that she was responsible. In Riders on the Storm, Densmore says Courson said she felt terribly guilty because she had obtained drugs that she believed had either caused or contributed to Morrison's death.

== Release and reception ==
The Doors was released theatrically by Tri-Star Pictures on March 1, 1991, and debuted at number 2 at the box office. The film grossed $34.4 million in the United States and Canada.

In July 1991, The Doors was entered into the 17th Moscow International Film Festival. In April 2019, a restored version of the film was selected to be shown in the Cannes Classics section at the 2019 Cannes Film Festival.

=== Critical reception ===
On Rotten Tomatoes, the film has a 58% approval rating based on 64 reviews and an average rating of 5.90/10. The site's consensus states: "Val Kilmer delivers a powerhouse performance as one of rock's most incendiary figures, but unfortunately, Oliver Stone is unable to shed much light on the circus surrounding the star." Metacritic reports a 62 out of 100 rating, based on 19 critics, indicating "generally favorable reviews". Audiences polled by CinemaScore gave the film an average grade of "B+" on an A+ to F scale.

In a contemporary review, Roger Ebert gave The Doors two-and-a-half out of four stars. Ebert wrote that the experience of watching the film was "not always very pleasant," but praised the acting performances, particularly Kilmer's. Contrarily, Peter Travers in Rolling Stone wrote a glowing review, rating it with four out of four stars. In a 2010 piece for Q magazine, Keith Cameron stated that "few people emerged from seeing the film having raised their opinions of that band and especially its singer Jim Morrison." The problem, as critic Cameron put it, was not so much that "Stone dwelled upon Morrison the inebriate, the philanderer, or the pretentious Lizard King", but rather the "clichéd Hollywood devices for sucking the wonder from the pioneering band: actors with fake hair saying silly things ..." and "a self-important director's turgid attempts to make grand statements about America."

=== Industry reception ===
Nicolas Cage said Kilmer should have won the Oscar for The Doors.

Following Kilmer's death on April 1, 2025, the Doors issued a statement on social media saying; "We are sad to hear of the passing of Val Kilmer, a truly gifted actor whose powerful performance as Jim in The Doors film helped introduce the band's story and music to a new generation. Val brought incredible depth, intensity, and heart to every role he played, and his dedication to portraying Jim left a lasting impression. Thank you, Val - you'll always be a part of The Doors' story". Drummer John Densmore called Kilmer "a gifted actor" who "miraculously played Jim [Morrison] in The Doors movie", and later wrote: "As an actor, Val's channeling of Jim (Morrison) was so close, he gave me the creeps on the set of Oliver Stone's biopic. He should have been nominated for an Oscar as Best Actor."

== Home media and The Final Cut ==
The film's rights have been with French company StudioCanal since 1996, as their parent company Canal+ had outbid 20th Century Fox for the rights to Carolco Pictures' library after it went bankrupt in 1995. The North American TV rights and digital distribution rights for Carolco's library (including The Doors) belong with Paramount Pictures through its acquisition of Spelling Entertainment, which itself was given these specific rights from Carolco in 1992. StudioCanal licensed out home video releases for Carolco titles to Artisan Entertainment, and its later successor Lionsgate Home Entertainment. Artisan released The Doors on DVD in 1997 and again on August 14, 2001, with it later released on Blu-ray on August 12, 2008. The film was released on 4K Blu-ray on July 23, 2019, with a new version of the film dubbed The Final Cut. Supervised by Stone, it features remastered sound and removes a scene where Morrison, following his trial, almost commits suicide. Stone later noted that he had cut 3 minutes for The Final Cut as he initially felt the film was too long but shortly after realised he had made a mistake as it left unanswered questions. He has said he prefers the theatrical version and wanted to ensure that version is available on home media.

== See also ==
- List of films featuring hallucinogens
- When You're Strange – a 2009 documentary film about the Doors
