= Dragonworld =

- Promotional VHS-release Poster
- Directed by: Ted Nicolaou
- Written by: Suzanne Glazener Naha; Ted Nicolaou
- Produced by: Albert Band; Charles Band
- Starring: Sam Mackenzie; Courtland Mead; Janet Henfrey
- Cinematography: Alan M. Trow
- Edited by: D. Brett Schramm
- Music by: Richard Band
- Production company: Full Moon Features
- Distributed by: Paramount Home Entertainment
- Release date: July 27, 1994
- Running time: 86 minutes
- Countries: United States; United Kingdom; Romania
- Language: English

Dragonworld is a 1994 American direct-to-video family fantasy film directed by Ted Nicolaou. It is the third film to be released by Moonbeam Entertainment, the family video division of Full Moon Entertainment.

== Plot ==
Set in the modern times, a young five-year-old boy, named Johnny McGowan travels to Scotland to live with his grandfather, Angus, after he loses both his parents in a traffic collision. At the magical wish tree on Angus' estate, he conjures up a friend, which is a baby dragon, who he names "Yowler". They grow up together as 15 years go by. In that time, his grandfather, Angus passes away and Yowler has grown to full size. One day after the years go by, documentary filmmaker, Bob Armstrong, his daughter, Beth and his pilot, Brownie McGee stumble upon Yowler. Eager for fame and money, Bob convinces John to "rent" Yowler to local corrupt businessman, Lester McIntyre. John, who is coerced in part by the offer to have the mounting taxes on the castle paid off, allows Lester to take Yowler in. He does so also partly because of his growing interest in Beth. Yowler is miserable and harassed in the new amusement park built for him, and when it becomes clear that McIntyre has duped them in order to exploit Yowler, John and his new friends take action.

== Cast ==
- Sam Mackenzie as Johnny McGowan
  - Courtland Mead as Young Johnny McGowan
- Brittney Powell as Beth Armstrong
- John Calvin as Bob Armstrong
- Lila Kaye as Mrs. Cosgrove
- John Woodvine as Lester MacIntyre
- Andrew Keir as Angus McGowan
- Richard Trask as Yowler the Dragon
- Janet Henfrey as Miss Twittingham
- Jim Dunk as Brownie McGee

== Soundtrack ==
Dragonworld: Soundtrack

Film score (Digital download)/Audio CD by Richard Band
- Released: June 12, 2012
- Length: 60:32
- Label: Intrada

All music is composed by Richard Band.

Track listing
No.	Title	Length
1.	"Main Title"	2:39
2.	"Grandpa's Legend"	6:59
3.	"Mrs. Cosgrove"	2:03
4.	"Behold The Manor"	5:34
5.	"Baby What?"	0:54
6.	"Dad's Old Room"	3:18
7.	"The Envelope For Taxes"	0:55
8.	"They Land"	4:10
9.	"Bagpipes And Gravesite"	3:20
10.	"Baby Dragon"	2:20
11.	"Showtime"	6:50
12.	"Yowler Goes Ape"	2:49
13.	"Getting Yowler Back"	10:39
14.	"All Is Well"	8:06
Total length:		60:32

== Filming locations ==
Haddon Hall and Manorbier Castle were used as locations during filming. Llangollen railway station was used as the Scottish station where the youngster first meets his grandfather.

== Home media ==
The film was released directly to videocassette and LaserDisc in 1994 by Paramount Home Video. It was re-issued on VHS in 1996, under the Paramount Family Favorites label. The film has been seen on DVD releases in Australia and Germany. It was officially released on DVD and Blu-Ray by Full Moon Features on February 8, 2022, in North America.

== Sequel ==
A sequel to the film, Dragonworld: The Legend Continues, was released directly to video in 1999, although filmed in 1996. The film bears little relation to the first film and has received mainly negative reviews from critics.
