= Courtland Mead =

American actor

- Born: Mission Viejo, California, U.S.
- Occupation: Actor
- Years active: 1991–2010

Courtland Mead is an American former actor, noted for his performances as a child actor during the 1990s.

== Career ==
Mead began acting at the age of 2, playing minor characters. His first noted achievement was when he played the part of young Johnny McGowan in the 1994 film Dragonworld. Later that same year, he appeared as Uh-huh in the 1994 feature-film adaptation of The Little Rascals. In 1997, Mead portrayed psychic child Danny Torrance in Stephen King's television adaptation of The Shining.

In 1997, he appeared on Late Night with Conan O'Brien and appeared in a commercial for Pizza Hut. The following year he co-starred with Jonathan Taylor Thomas and Brad Renfro in Disney's Tom and Huck. He also played Howard in Corrina, Corrina with Whoopi Goldberg, Jack Merchant in Hellraiser IV, and Kirk Cameron's youngest brother in the short-lived WB sitcom Kirk. Mead had spoken parts in The Haunting, based on the Shirley Jackson novel The Haunting of Hill House, Disney's Ariel the Little Mermaid, and 1995's Babe. Mead also provided the voices of Gus Griswold in the Disney animated series Recess and Ned Needlemeyer in Nightmare Ned, as well as the titular character in Disney's Lloyd in Space. He has also reprised his role in The Young and the Restless as Nina's son, starting as Young Phillip and Phillip Chancellor IV. In 2010, he appeared as Tommy Farrell in Mean Parents Suck.

== Filmography ==
=== Film ===
Year	Title	Role	Notes
1991	For Parents Only	Tommy	
1992	Only You	Frank Jr.	
1994	Dragonworld	Young Johnny McGowan	
1994	The Little Rascals	John "Uh-Huh" Collum	
1994	Corrina, Corrina	Howard Davis	
1995	Babe	Puppy (voice)	
1995	Tom and Huck	Sid	
1996	Hellraiser: Bloodline	Jack Merchant	
1998	Emma's Wish	Danny Bookman	
1998	A Bug's Life	Fly (voice)	
1999	Go	Boy	
2001	Recess: School's Out	Gus Griswald (voice)	Main role
2003	Recess: Taking the Fifth Grade	Gus Griswald (voice)	Direct-to-video
2010	Mean Parents Suck	Tommy	

=== Television ===
Year	Title	Role	Notes
1991	Baby Talk	Santa's Visior #2	Episode: "Away in a Manger"
1992	A Child Lost Forever: The Jerry Sherwood Story	Dennis Craig Jurgens	Television film
1993	Lake Consequence	Christopher	Television film
1993–1994	The Young and the Restless	Phillip Chancellor IV	11 episodes
1994	In the Best of Families: Marriage, Pride & Madness	Young Jimmy	Television film
1994	One Women's Courage	Michael Pearson	Television film
1994–2003	Touched by an Angel	Matthew Mills	Episode: "The Road Home: Pt I"
1994–2009	ER	Vanilla Latte Boy	Episode: "Leave It to Weaver"
1995	Coach	Little Boy	Episode: "Ten Percent of Nothing"
1995	Indictment: The McMartin Trial	Malcolm Johnson	Television film
1995	What Love Sees	Hap Holly	Television film
1995–1996	Kirk	Russell Hartman	31 episodes
1996–1999	Promised Land	Matthew Mills	Episode: "Vengeance Is Mine: Pt II"
1997	The Jamie Foxx Show	Maguire	Episode: "The Young and the Meatless"
1997	The Shining	Daniel Anthony Torrance	TV Mini-series; 3 episodes
1997	Nightmare Ned	Ned (voice)	25 episodes
1997	Rugrats	Ricky (voice)	Episode: "Dust Bunnies/Educating Angelica"
1997–2001	Recess	Gus Griswald (voice)	Main role
1998	Hercules	Alexander (voice)	Episode: "Hercules and the Kids"
1998	Beyond Belief: Fact or Fiction	Randy	Episode: "The Woods"
1999–2000	NYPD Blue	Kyle Kirkendall	3 episodes
2001–2004	Lloyd in Space	Lloyd Nebulon (voice)	Main role

=== Video games ===
Year	Title	Role
1992	Disney's Ariel the Little Mermaid	Flounder
1997	Ariel's Story Studio	Flounder
1997	Nightmare Ned	Ned Needlemeyer
