= The Fibonaccis =

American art rock band

- The Fibonaccis, circa 1982. Left to right: Berardi, Dentino, Corey and Song.

Background information
- Origin: Los Angeles, California, US
- Genres: Art rock, new wave, post-punk
- Years active: 1981–1988, 1992
- Labels: Index Records, Enigma Records, Blue Yonder Sounds, Restless Records
- Past members: Magie Song; John Dentino; Joe Berardi; Ron Stringer; Tom Corey

The Fibonaccis were an American art rock band formed in 1981 in Los Angeles. The band consisted of songwriters John Dentino (keyboards) and Ron Stringer (guitar), Magie Song (vocals), Joe Berardi (drums) and later Tom Corey (bass).

== Formation ==
The Fibonaccis were formed out of the Los Angeles art punk scene which included bands such as Wall of Voodoo and Oingo Boingo. Deriving their name from 13th-century mathematician Leonardo Fibonacci and citing musical influence from Nino Rota and Ennio Morricone, the band's music was typically characterized by intricate piano and guitar lines, over-the-top and sometimes incomprehensible vocals and frequent use of unconventional instruments such as mandolins, clarinets and Mellotrons. The Fibonaccis' music was nearly impossible to categorize, fusing such disparate elements as post-punk, progressive rock, jazz, world music, cabaret, ambient, spoken word and funk, a combination one newspaper critic described as "elevator music from hell". Lyrically, the band regularly explored dark and esoteric subject matter ranging from serial killers to UFOs, presented in a satirical and surrealist fashion.

== Career ==
The Fibonaccis released their debut EP (fi'-bo-na'-chez) in 1982, following up with a 12" single/EP, Tumor/Psycho/Slow Beautiful Sex, the next year. In 1984, the group independently filmed a music video for an unreleased cover of Jimi Hendrix's "Purple Haze". Played in an instrumentally discordant fashion and sung in screeched vocals, the psychedelic music video re-worked the song into an anthem for a cult, book-ended by audio clips from Charles Manson interviews.

By the mid-1980s, the Fibonaccis had emerged as a prominent presence in the Los Angeles art rock scene, acting as touring support for the likes of Sparks, Oingo Boingo and Wall of Voodoo and performing as part of the 1985 New Music America festival.

Throughout their career, the Fibonaccis regularly contributed their music to independent film soundtracks. In 1986, the band collaborated with composer Richard Band on the score for the horror-comedy TerrorVision, recording five tracks including the movie's theme song. Their song "Sergio Leone" was used for the closing credits of 1982's Android and the previously unrecorded track "Art Life" was featured in 1987's Slam Dance. The Fibonaccis appeared onscreen as the band "Sexy Holiday" in the 1987 comedy Valet Girls, lipsynching to "Slow Beautiful Sex" and "Purple Haze" during a party scene.

In 1987, the band released their sole studio LP, Civilization and Its Discotheques, on the Blue Yonder Sounds label. In explaining the reason for the LP's delay, the group said that various hassles and difficulties with record companies had plagued a more timely release. Their frustration over the album's recording, added with a lack of media recognition, led to their breakup in 1988.

In 1992, Restless Records released a 26-track retrospective of the band's work called Repressed - The Best of the Fibonaccis. To celebrate the release of the album, the Fibonaccis performed a one-off reunion show in Los Angeles on November 19, 1992, their final public performance with all the members.

== Post-Fibonaccis ==
Following the Fibonaccis' disbandment, John Dentino continued to compose music independently and has recently been working on independent documentary films. Joe Berardi went on to perform and tour with Wall of Voodoo's Stan Ridgway, and has collaborated with artists including Lydia Lunch, Congo Norvell, Donovan and Rufus Wainwright. Magie Song acted in a number of independent films in the early 1990s, including Gregg Araki's The Living End and Stephen Sayadian's Dr. Caligari, and currently works as an acupuncturist in Los Angeles. Tom Corey died from a cerebral aneurysm in late 2001. Ron Stringer served as film editor and critic for the LA Weekly and later as an English professor in L.A.'s community colleges. He died from liver cancer in late 2021.

Currently, the entire Fibonaccis physical discography is out of print, with Repressed being their only work released on compact disc. In 2021, the group released the majority of their repertoire on worldwide music streaming services and created a Bandcamp page for digital download. In 2022, The Fibonaccis opened their archives and digitally released two new collections of live radio shows, club rarities, and demos.

== Band members ==
- Magie Song - lead vocals, percussion
- John Dentino - keyboards, piano, synthesizer, Mellotron, vocoder
- Joe Berardi - drums, percussion, vibes, "mortecello"
- Ron Stringer (formation – 1986) - guitar, bass, vocals
- Tom Corey (1983–1988) - bass, guitar, mandolin, vocals

== Discography ==
=== Studio albums ===
- Civilization and Its Discotheques (1987, Blue Yonder Sounds)

=== EPs and singles ===
- (fi'-bo-na'-chez) (1982, Index Records)
  - 1. "Sergio Leone" (Dentino, Stringer) - 2:12
  - 2. "Somnambulist" (Dentino, Stringer) - 3:03
  - 3. "The Ordinary Women" (Dentino, Wallace Stevens) - 2:23
  - 4. "The Genius" (Dentino, Stringer) - 2:48
  - 5. "Second Coming" (Dentino, Stringer) - 3:31
  - 6. "Maculae" (Dentino, Song, Stringer) - 2:33
  - 7. "Rice Song" (Dentino, Song, Stringer) - 2:41
- Tumor (1983, Enigma Records)
  - 1. "Tumor" (The Fibonaccis) - 3:25
  - 2. "Slow Beautiful Sex" (The Fibonaccis) - 2:38
  - 3. "Psycho" (Bernard Herrmann) - 3:15
- TerrorVision: Original Motion Picture Soundtrack (1986, Restless Records)
  - 1. "TerrorVision" (The Fibonaccis) - 3:40
  - 2. "The Friends of Crime" (The Fibonaccis) - 2:47
  - 3. "Sack of Suit Suite" (The Fibonaccis) - 2:58
  - 4. "Advice to a Mutant" (The Fibonaccis, Hal Negro) - 2:43
  - 5. "He Can't Stop Laughing" (The Fibonaccis) - 2:50

=== Compilations ===
- Repressed – The Best of the Fibonaccis (1993, Restless Records)

=== Compilation appearances ===
- Film Noir: American Style (1984, Ding Dong Records and Tapes)
  - "Looking for Eddie" (Berardi) - 4:45
- Radio Tokyo Tapes Vol. 2 (1984, Enigma Records)
  - "Purple Haze" (Jimi Hendrix) - 3:58
- The Lives of Lhasa (1984, Lhasa Productions)
  - "Disgusting Man (live)" -
- Slam Dance: Original Motion Picture Soundtrack (1987, Island Records)
  - "Art Life" (Fibonaccis) - 2:21
- The Best of the Radio Tokyo Tapes (1987, Chameleon Music)
  - "Purple Haze" (Hendrix) - 3:58
