= Ted Nicolaou =

American film director

- Born: October 3, 1949 (75 year old)
- Occupations: Director, editor, screenwriter

Ted Nicolaou is an American film director, screenwriter and editor. His most famous directorial effort is the Subspecies film series. Apart from his feature film projects, he also works in television.

After graduating from the University of Texas film program, he joined the crew of The Texas Chain Saw Massacre (1974) as a sound recordist. Later, he joined Charles Band's Empire Pictures, where he worked as an editor on such films as Ghoulies (1985) and eventually debuted as a director with The Dungeonmaster (1984) and TerrorVision (1986).

== Selected filmography ==
- The Dungeonmaster (1984)
- TerrorVision (1986)
- Subspecies (1991)
- Bad Channels (1992)
- Remote (1993)
- Bloodstone: Subspecies II (1993)
- Bloodlust: Subspecies III (1994)
- Dragonworld (1994)
- Leapin' Leprechauns! (1995)
- Vampire Journals (1997)
- The Shrunken City (1998)
- Subspecies 4: Bloodstorm (1998)
- Ragdoll (1999)
- The St. Francisville Experiment (2000)
- The Horrible Dr. Bones (2000)
- In the Shadow of the Cobra (2004)
- Puppet Master vs. Demonic Toys (2004)
- Aliens Gone Wild (2005)
- The Etruscan Mask (2007)
- DevilDolls (2012)
- Finding Happiness (2014)
- Bunker of Blood: Chapter 2 - Deadly Dolls: Deepest Cuts (2018)
- Vampire Slaughter: Eaten Alive (2018)
- Don't Let Her In (2021)
- Subspecies V: Blood Rise (2023)

== Writer ==
- The Dungeonmaster (1984) ( segment "Desert Pursuit")
- Savage Island (1985) (written by – as Nicholas Beardsley)
- TerrorVision (1986)
- Bloodstone: Subspecies II (1993)
- Bloodlust: Subspecies III (1994)
- Vampire Journals (1995)
- Subspecies 4: Bloodstorm (1996)
- Dragonworld: The Legend Continues (1999)
- Dracula the Impaler (2002)
- Dali & Disney: A Date with Destino (2010)
- The Cinemagician, Georges Méliès (2012)
- Subspecies V: Blood Rise (2023)

== Selected shorts ==
- Rookie and Police Captain (2019)
- Boxer and Bookie (2019)
- Johnny and Dana (2019)
- Mobster Father and Son (2019)
- Doctor and Patient (2019)
- Lawyer and Opposing Counsel (2019)
