= Civilization and Its Discotheques =

Studio album by The Fibonaccis
- Released: October 1987
- Genre: Art rock; new wave; alternative rock
- Length: 36:41
- Label: Blue Yonder Sounds
- Producer: The Fibonaccis

Civilization and Its Discotheques is the sole LP release of Los Angeles art rock band The Fibonaccis, released in 1987 on Blue Yonder Sounds. The album's title is an obvious reference to Sigmund Freud's 1929 book Civilization and Its Discontents.

Like all of the Fibonaccis' work, Civilization and Its Discotheques is out of print, though the album is currently available for download on the band's official website. The majority of its tracks were later featured on the band's 1992 retrospective compilation album, Repressed - The Best of the Fibonaccis.

== Track listing ==
No.	Title	Writer(s)	Length
1.	"March to Heaven"	Dentino	3:18
2.	"Narcissist"	Dentino, Stringer	3:17
3.	"Had It with Girls"	Stringer	3:57
4.	"Crickets"	music: Stringer, words: Emily Dickinson	4:21
5.	"Leroy"	Dentino, Stringer, Song	3:00
6.	"The Thread"	Dentino	3:26
7.	"Stay Home"	Dentino	2:30
8.	"Medicine Waltz"	Dentino	2:52
9.	"Some Men"	Dentino	2:37
10.	"Old Mean Ed Gein"	Dentino	3:17
11.	"Romp of the Meiji Sycophants"	Dentino, Corey, Song, Berardi	2:23
12.	"The Snap"	Dentino	3:43
Total length:			36:41

=== Song information ===
- "Narcissist" is based on the book The Culture of Narcissism by Christopher Lasch.
- "Crickets" is a spoken word rendition of an untitled Emily Dickinson poem.
- "Leroy" is a spoken word piece composed of dialogue from The Bad Seed.

== Personnel ==
=== The Fibonaccis ===
- John Dentino - piano, Mellotron, synthesizer, vocoder
- Magie Song - vocals
- Joseph Berardi - drums, percussion, cello (track 10)
- Tom Corey - bass guitar, mandolin, guitar (tracks 5, 10, 11 and 12), slide guitar (track 9)
- Ron Stringer - vocals (tracks 3, 4 and 8), guitar (tracks 1, 2, 3, 4 and 7)

=== Guest musicians ===
- Bruce Fowler - trombone ("Medicine Waltz")
- Lynn Johnston - bass clarinet, oboe ("Medicine Waltz")
- Mike Price - trumpet ("Medicine Waltz")
- Bill Rhea - violin ("Some Men", "Old Mean Ed Gein")
- Stan Ridgway - harmonica ("Old Mean Ed Gein")
- Bill Roper - tuba ("Medicine Waltz")

=== Production ===
- Engineered by Steve Sharp and Charles Ramirez
- Recorded at Juniper Studios in Burbank, California and Casbah Studios in Fullerton, California
- Mixed at Juniper Studios.
- Mastered by Jeff Sanders at KM Records in Burbank, California.
