= Donovan Cook =

American film director and animator (born 1968)

- Born: Donovan Cook; January 30, 1968 (age 58); Berkeley, California, U.S.
- Occupations: Television producer, director, animator, cartoonist
- Years active: 1990–present
- Known for: 2 Stupid Dogs

Donovan Cook (born January 30, 1968) is an American filmmaker, animator, cartoonist, director, and producer, best known for creating, directing and producing the animated series Hanna-Barbera's 2 Stupid Dogs and directing the Disney animated features Return to Never Land and Mickey, Donald, Goofy: The Three Musketeers, as well as co-executive producing the animated series Gabby's Dollhouse.

== Early life and career ==
Cook was born in Berkeley, California, on January 30, 1968, and moved to San Diego at the age of 14. He graduated from the California Institute of the Arts in 1989, after which he began working for Disney on several Disney animated films, such as The Little Mermaid and the Mickey Mouse adaptation of The Prince and the Pauper.

In 1993, Cook created the Emmy-nominated television series 2 Stupid Dogs for Hanna-Barbera; he got the idea for the series from two stray dogs roaming in his apartment and was trying to sell it when Hanna-Barbera bought it. Secret Squirrel was one of his favorite Hanna-Barbera cartoons that he watched in the 1970s, which influenced him to revive the series as Super Secret Secret Squirrel, the middle segment in 2 Stupid Dogs.

Cook returned to Disney in 1997, where he developed and produced the series Nightmare Ned. In 1998, he returned to feature animation when he co-directed Return to Never Land for Disney. In 2001, he directed the first feature-length film starring Mickey Mouse series characters Mickey Mouse and Donald Duck; Goofy had previously appeared in A Goofy Movie and its sequel, An Extremely Goofy Movie. The film, Mickey, Donald, Goofy: The Three Musketeers, was released on DVD in 2004. He also served as a director for Mickey Mouse Clubhouse and The Adventures of Kid Danger and an assistant director for The Ren & Stimpy Show, as well as doing sheet timing for episodes of the Ben 10 reboot.

Cook also directed the micro-budget indie film Rideshare: The Movie, the first film to be shot entirely on the iPhone 4. It was released on April 12, 2011, at the Buffalo Niagara Film Festival and was subsequently shown at the Honolulu Film Awards, receiving positive reviews.

Currently, Cook is co-executive producer of the preschool animated series Gabby's Dollhouse, produced by DreamWorks Animation for Netflix.
