= List of programs broadcast by Cartoon Network (Australia and New Zealand) =

This is a list of programs broadcast by Cartoon Network in Australia and New Zealand.

== Current (Australia)/Final (New Zealand) programming ==
- 50/50 Heroes
- Adventure Time
- The Amazing World of Gumball
- Batwheels
- Ben 10: Omniverse
- Ben 10 (2016)
- Boy Girl Dog Cat Mouse Cheese
- Bugs Bunny Builders
- Chowder
- Clarence
- Courage the Cowardly Dog
- Craig of the Creek
- Foster's Home for Imaginary Friends
- Grizzy & the Lemmings
- Jellystone!
- Justice League Action
- Lamput
- Looney Tunes Cartoons
- Mechamato
- The Powerpuff Girls (2016)
- Regular Show
- Scooby-Doo! Mystery Incorporated
- Steven Universe
- Teen Titans Go!
- Tiny Toons Looniversity
- The Tom and Jerry Show (2014)
- Total DramaRama
- Unikitty!
- We Baby Bears
- We Bare Bears

== Former programming ==
- The 13 Ghosts of Scooby-Doo
- 2 Stupid Dogs
- A Pup Named Scooby-Doo
- Ace & Avery
- The Addams Family (1992)
- The Adventures of Batman
- The Adventures of Batman & Robin
- The Adventures of Don Coyote and Sancho Panda
- The Adventures of Chuck & Friends
- The Adventures of Rocky and Bullwinkle and Friends
- The Adventures of Tintin
- The Adventures of Superboy
- The All-New Super Friends Hour
- All-New Pound Puppies
- Alvin and the Chipmunks (1983)
- The Amazing Adrenalini Brothers
- The Amazing Chan and the Chan Clan
- Angelo Rules
- Animaniacs (1993)
- Arabian Knights
- Aquaman
- The Archie Show
- Archie's Comedy Hour
- Astro Boy (2003)
- Atom Ant
- Atomic Betty
- Augie Doggie and Doggie Daddy
- The Avengers: Earth's Mightiest Heroes
- Baby Blues
- Baby Looney Tunes
- Bakugan: Battle Brawlers
- Bakugan: Battle Planet
- Bakugan: Gundalian Invaders
- Bakugan: Mechtanium Surge
- The Banana Splits
- Barney Bear
- The Batman
- Batman: The Animated Series
- Batman: The Brave and the Bold
- Batman Beyond
- Battle B-Daman
- Be Cool, Scooby-Doo!
- Bedrock Cops
- Beast Wars: Transformers
- Beetlejuice
- Ben 10 (2005)
- Ben 10: Alien Force
- Ben 10: Ultimate Alien
- Ben 10 Ultimate Challenge
- The Berenstain Bears (1985)
- Beyblade
- Beyblade V-Force
- Beyblade G-Revolution
- Big Bag
- Birdman and the Galaxy Trio
- Blackstar
- The Biskitts
- Blue Submarine No. 6
- The Brady Kids
- The Brak Show
- Bobobo-bo Bo-bobo
- Bunnicula
- Breezly and Sneezly
- The Buford Files
- The Bugs Bunny Show
- Bugs 'n' Daffy
- Butch Cassidy and the Sundance Kids
- Cabbage Patch Kids
- Camp Lazlo
- Capitol Critters
- Captain Caveman and the Teen Angels
- Captain Planet and the Planeteers
- Captain Scarlet and the Mysterons
- Cardcaptors
- Cartoon Cartoons
- Casper and the Angels
- Casper's Scare School
- Cattanooga Cats
- Cave Kids
- CB Bears
- Centurions
- Chop Socky Chooks
- Class of 3000
- Cloudy with a Chance of Meatballs (TV series)
- Creepschool
- Codename: Kids Next Door
- Code Lyoko
- The Completely Mental Misadventures of Ed Grimley
- Cow and Chicken
- Cowboy Bebop
- The Cramp Twins
- Creepschool
- Crocadoo
- Crush Gear Turbo
- Cupcake & Dino: General Services
- Cyborg 009
- Dastardly and Muttley in Their Flying Machines
- Devlin
- Dexter's Laboratory
- Di-Gata Defenders
- Dino and Cavemouse
- Dink the Little Dinosaur
- Doraemon (2005)
- Dorothy and the Wizard of Oz
- Dr. Zitbag's Transylvania Pet Shop
- Dragon Ball (1986)
- Dragon Ball Z
- Dragon Ball GT
- Dragon's Lair
- Dragon Tales
- DreamWorks Dragons
- Droopy
- Droopy, Master Detective
- Duck Dodgers
- Duel Masters
- Dumb and Dumber
- Dynomutt, Dog Wonder
- Ed, Edd n Eddy
- Eliot Kid
- Elliott from Earth
- Evil Con Carne
- Eon Kid
- Exchange Student Zero
- The Fantastic Four (1967)
- Fantastic Four: World's Greatest Heroes
- Fantastic Max
- Fat Albert and the Cosby Kids
- Felix the Cat
- Fireball XL5
- Fish Police
- The Flintstones
- The Flintstone Comedy Hour
- The Flintstone Kids
- Frankenstein Jr. and The Impossibles
- Franklin
- Freakazoid!
- The Fungies!
- F-Zero: GP Legend
- Garfield and Friends
- The Garfield Show
- Generator Rex
- George of the Jungle (1967)
- George of the Jungle (2007)
- Green Lantern: The Animated Series
- Grim & Evil
- The Grim Adventures of Billy & Mandy
- Godzilla (1978)
- Goldie Gold and Action Jack
- Goober and the Ghost Chasers
- Hamtaro
- He-Man and the Masters of the Universe (2002)
- Heathcliff
- Help!... It's the Hair Bear Bunch!
- Hero: 108
- The Herculoids
- Hi Hi Puffy AmiYumi
- The Hillbilly Bears
- Hokey Wolf
- Home Movies
- Hong Kong Phooey
- Horrid Henry
- Hot Wheels: AcceleRacers
- Hot Wheels Battle Force 5
- Huckleberry Hound
- I Am Weasel
- I'm an Animal
- Iggy Arbuckle
- IGPX
- Inch High Private Eye
- Infinity Train
- Jabberjaw
- Jeannie
- Jimmy Two-Shoes
- James Bond Jr.
- Joe 90
- Johnny Bravo
- Johnny Test
- Josie and the Pussycats
- Josie and the Pussycats in Outer Space
- Jumanji
- Justice League
- Justice League Unlimited
- The Jetsons
- K9
- Karate Kommandos
- Kingdom Force
- Krypto the Superdog
- The Kwicky Koala Show
- Laff-A-Lympics
- League of Super Evil
- Lego Dreamzzz
- Level Up
- The Life and Times of Juniper Lee
- Lippy the Lion and Hardy Har Har
- Lili's Islands
- Little Dracula
- Little Red Tractor
- Loonatics Unleashed
- Looney Tunes
- Loopy De Loop
- The Looney Tunes Show
- The Magilla Gorilla Show
- Magi-Nation
- Mighty Man and Yukk
- The Marvelous Misadventures of Flapjack
- The Mask: Animated Series
- Matt Hatter Chronicles
- Matt's Monsters
- Max Steel (2000)
- Medabots
- MegaMan NT Warrior
- Megas XLR
- Merlin the Magical Puppy
- Men in Black: The Series
- Mighty Magiswords
- Mike, Lu & Og
- Mister T
- Mixels
- Mobile Suit Gundam Wing
- Moby Dick
- Monchichis
- Monster Beach
- Monster Rancher
- The Moxy Show
- ¡Mucha Lucha!
- Mr. Bean
- Mr. Bean: The Animated Series
- Mr. Men
- My Gym Partner's a Monkey
- My Little Pony: Friendship Is Magic
- Nanny 911
- Naruto
- Ned's Newt
- The New Fred and Barney Show
- New Looney Tunes
- The New Batman Adventures
- The New Adventures of Captain Planet
- The New Adventures of Flash Gordon
- The New Adventures of Gilligan
- The New Adventures of He-Man
- The New Adventures of Huckleberry Finn
- The New Adventures of Superman
- The New Adventures of Zorro (1981)
- The New Scooby and Scrappy-Doo Show
- The New Scooby-Doo Movies
- The New Shmoo
- The New Woody Woodpecker Show
- The New Yogi Bear Show
- OK K.O.! Let's Be Heroes
- Nexo Knights
- Ninjago
- Ninja Robots
- One Piece
- Ozzy & Drix
- Pac-Man
- Paw Paws
- Paddington Bear
- The Pebbles and Bamm-Bamm Show
- The Perils of Penelope Pitstop
- Pet Alien
- Peter Potamus
- Pink Panther and Pals
- The Pink Panther Show
- Pink Panther and Sons
- Pinky and the Brain
- Pinky, Elmyra & the Brain
- The Pirates of Dark Water
- Pixie and Dixie and Mr. Jinks
- Planet Sketch
- Plastic Man
- The Plucky Duck Show
- Pokémon
- Pokémon Chronicles
- Police Academy
- Popeye
- The Popeye Show
- The Porky Pig Show
- Popples (1986)
- Pound Puppies (1986)
- Power Players
- The Powerpuff Girls (1998)
- Rave Master
- The Real Adventures of Jonny Quest
- Rescue Heroes
- Richie Rich (1980)
- Ricochet Rabbit & Droop-a-Long
- Robotboy
- Robotomy
- The Road Runner Show
- Sailor Moon
- Samurai Jack
- Sealab 2021
- Sidekick
- Scooby-Doo, Where Are You!
- Scooby-Doo and Scrappy-Doo (1979)
- Scooby-Doo and Scrappy-Doo (1980)
- The Secret Saturdays
- Secret Squirrel
- The Secret World of Benjamin Bear
- Shaggy & Scooby-Doo Get a Clue!
- Shaman King
- Sheep in the Big City
- Skatoony
- Skunk Fu!
- The Smurfs (1981)
- Snagglepuss
- Snorks
- Space: 1999
- Space Ghost
- Space Ghost Coast to Coast
- Speed Racer
- Speed Racer: The Next Generation
- Spike and Tyke
- Squirrel Boy
- Static Shock
- Star Wars: Clone Wars
- Star Wars: The Clone Wars
- Stickin' Around
- Stingray (1964)
- Summer Camp Island
- Supercar
- Super Friends
- Super Shiro
- Superman (1940s)
- Superman: The Animated Series
- Supernoobs
- Sushi Pack
- SWAT Kats: The Radical Squadron
- The Sylvester & Tweety Mysteries
- Sym-Bionic Titan
- Taffy
- Talking Tom & Friends
- Teen Days
- Teen Titans
- Teenage Mutant Ninja Turtles (2003)
- Terrahawks
- Thundarr the Barbarian
- Thunderbirds
- ThunderCats (1985)
- ThunderCats (2011)
- ThunderCats Roar
- Time Squad
- Time Warp Trio
- Tiny Toon Adventures
- Tom and Jerry
- The Tom and Jerry Show (1975)
- Tom & Jerry Kids
- Tom and Jerry Tales
- ToonHeads
- Top Cat
- Total Drama
- Total Drama Action
- Total Drama All-Stars and Pahkitew Island
- Total Drama Island
- Total Drama Presents: The Ridonculous Race
- Total Drama World Tour
- Total Drama: Pahkitew Island
- Total Drama: Revenge of the Island
- The Toy Warrior (2005)
- The Transformers
- Transformers: Armada
- Transformers: Cybertron
- Transformers: Energon
- Transformers: Prime
- Transformers: Rescue Bots
- Transformers: Robots in Disguise (2015)
- Ultimate Muscle: The Kinnikuman Legacy
- Undeclared
- Underdog
- Valley of the Dinosaurs
- Wait Till Your Father Gets Home
- Wally Gator
- Wacky Races (1968)
- What a Cartoon!
- What's New, Scooby-Doo?
- What a Cartoon!
- Whatever Happened to... Robot Jones?
- Waynehead
- William's Wish Wellingtons
- Winx Club
- The Woody Woodpecker Show
- X-Men: Evolution
- Xiaolin Chronicles
- Xiaolin Showdown
- Yakky Doodle
- Yippee, Yappee and Yahooey
- Yo Yogi!
- Yogi Bear
- Yogi's Gang
- Yogi's Space Race
- Yogi's Treasure Hunt
- Young Robin Hood
- Yu-Gi-Oh!
- Yu-Gi-Oh! GX
- Yu-Gi-Oh! 5D's
- YuYu Hakusho
- Zatch Bell!
- The Zeta Project
- Zoids: Chaotic Century
- Zoids: Fuzors
- Zoids: New Century
