= Don Messick =

American voice actor (1926–1997)

- Messick in 1972
- Born: Donald Earle Messick; September 7, 1926; Buffalo, New York, U.S.
- Died: October 24, 1997 (aged 71); Salinas, California, U.S.
- Occupation: Voice actor
- Years active: 1941–1996
- Known for: Voice of Scooby-Doo
- Spouse: Helen M. McHugh (m. 1953)
- Children: 1

Donald Earle Messick (September 7, 1926 – October 24, 1997) was an American voice actor, known for his performances in Hanna-Barbera cartoons. His best-remembered voice roles include Scooby-Doo; Bamm-Bamm Rubble and Hoppy in The Flintstones; Astro in The Jetsons; Muttley in Wacky Races and Dastardly and Muttley in Their Flying Machines; Boo-Boo Bear and Ranger Smith in The Yogi Bear Show; Sebastian the Cat in Josie and the Pussycats; Gears, Ratchet, and Scavenger in The Transformers; Papa Smurf and Azrael in The Smurfs; Hamton J. Pig in Tiny Toon Adventures; and Dr. Benton Quest in Jonny Quest.

== Early life ==
Messick was born on September 7, 1926, in Buffalo, New York, the son of Binford Earl Messick, a house painter, and Lena Birch (née Hughes). He had one brother, F. Thomas Messick. He was raised in the Bolton Hill neighborhood of Baltimore, where he received his early training as a performer at the Ramsay Street School of Acting.

== Career ==
=== Early work ===
At first, Messick wanted to be a ventriloquist and even supported himself as one for a time in the late 1940s and early 1950s. At the age of 15, Messick performed in front of the program manager and chief announcer at radio station WBOC in Salisbury, Maryland, and was given his own weekly show, for which Messick performed all of the character voices and sound effects.

Messick moved back to Baltimore a year later, after graduating high school, and approached radio station WCAO about getting his one-man show on the air. As Messick worked to reduce the Baltimore accent identified by the manager of WCAO as an impediment to his radio career, Messick's father was killed, along with two other men, in an accident at the Nanticoke School. Two other workers and he were taking down a flagpole when it came into contact with electric power lines, electrocuting all three men.

In 1944, Messick joined the US Army, performing for troops as a part of the Special Services for 20 months. Messick's first big break came when he was hired by the Mutual Broadcasting radio station in Los Angeles, where he played Raggedy Andy and Farmer Seedling on the radio series The Raggedy Ann Show.

At MGM, Tex Avery was producing the Droopy cartoons. When regular voice actor Bill Thompson was unavailable, Avery hired Messick at veteran MGM voice actor Daws Butler's recommendation.

=== Early Hanna Barbera voice work ===
When William Hanna and Joseph Barbera formed their own animation studio, Hanna-Barbera, in 1957, Messick and Butler became a voice-acting team for the company. Messick and Butler's first collaboration was Ruff and Reddy. Messick was Ruff the cat and the Droopy-sounding Professor Gizmo, while Butler played the dog, Reddy. Messick also narrated the show, which had a serialized storyline. From 1958 to 1959, Messick played Tadpole in the animated television series, Spunky and Tadpole, produced by Beverly Hills Productions.

From 1957 to 1965, Butler and Messick gave voice to a large number of characters. Almost always the sidekick or supporting foil, Messick's characters were not usually headliners. His notable roles in this era were Boo Boo Bear, Ranger Smith, Major Minor, Pixie Mouse, Astro on The Jetsons, and Dr. Benton Quest (replacing John Stephenson) on The Adventures of Jonny Quest. On The Flintstones, in addition to many episodic characters and creatures, he voiced Bamm-Bamm Rubble, Hoppy the hopparoo, and Arnold the paper boy.

He was used primarily for his narration skills, which were heard on many of those cartoons in which Daws Butler starred. In narrating The Huckleberry Hound Show and as Ranger Smith in the Yogi Bear segments, he used something close to his natural voice.

Messick was eventually featured as Ricochet Rabbit in Ricochet Rabbit (1964–65), while Deputy Droop-a-Long was voiced by Mel Blanc. He did the voices of the title character in Precious Pupp and Shag Rugg from Hillbilly Bears, both of which were segments from The Atom Ant/Secret Squirrel Show. In 1966, Messick took over the roles of Atom Ant and Mr. Peebles on The Magilla Gorilla Show from Howard Morris, who had left Hanna-Barbera.

In outer-space and superhero cartoons, Don Messick created noises and sounds for weird space creatures and aliens. His Ranger Smith voice was often heard as various villains. His narrator voice was given to Vapor Man on The Galaxy Trio, Dr. Benton Quest, the Perilous Paper Doll Man, and Multi Man on The Impossibles.

=== Scooby-Doo and later roles ===
In 1969, he was cast as the cowardly canine title character on Scooby-Doo, Where Are You!. He voiced him through all of the various versions of Scooby-Doo: on television in numerous formats from 1969 until his retirement, including television films, and a number of commercials, as well. In 1970, he voiced Sebastian on Josie and the Pussycats, and reprised the role in its spin-off Josie and the Pussycats in Outer Space two years later, as well as voicing the new alien character, Bleep. From 1980 to 1988, he voiced Scooby's nephew, Scrappy-Doo, having taken over the role originated by Lennie Weinrib in 1979; he continued to voice Scooby-Doo when A Pup Named Scooby-Doo came along from 1988 to 1991.

In Hong Kong Phooey, he was the voice of Spot the Cat, a faithful sidekick that was the one who foiled the villain's plans, though he let the clueless title character take the glory. In 1977, he voiced Balin and a few incidental characters in the first animated adaptation of The Hobbit by J. R. R. Tolkien.

By the 1970s, the popularity of Yogi Bear led to several spin-off TV series and television movies featuring the character. Messick reprised his roles of Boo-Boo and Ranger Smith from the 1970s until 1994 on Yogi's Gang, Laff-a-Lympics, Yogi's Treasure Hunt, and The New Yogi Bear Show.

He played Papa Smurf on The Smurfs from 1981 to 1989 and Ratchet (the Autobot doctor), Gears, and Constructicon Scavenger on The Transformers. In 1985, new episodes of The Jetsons were produced and Messick returned as Astro, RUDI, Mac, and Uniblab, a pesky robot that worked for Mr. Spacely.

He also starred in the Masters of the Universe Golden Book video as He-Man. In 1985, he voiced Louie and Snichey in The Pound Puppies TV special, in 1988, he had an uncredited role as the Pimp of the Year pageant announcer on I'm Gonna Git You Sucka, and he returned to his role of Benton Quest on The New Adventures of Jonny Quest (1986–1987).

Messick also played a live-action role on the MTM Enterprises sitcom Duck Factory, playing a cartoon voice actor named Wally Wooster. In one episode, frequent collaborator Frank Welker guest-starred as a rival voice artist angling for his job. Don Messick said of his character on the show: "Wally was never quite sure whether he was Wally or Dippy Duck".

From 1990 to 1995, he voiced Hamton J. Pig in Amblin's Tiny Toon Adventures and its spin-offs. Around that time, he also returned as the voice of Droopy for Tom & Jerry Kids and Droopy, Master Detective. On the 1995 Freakazoid! episode "Toby Danger in Doomsday Bet", a spoof of Jonny Quest, he played Dr. Vernon Danger, a parody of Benton Quest.

At a charity speaking engagement in London, shortly before his death, he performed many of his characters, except Scooby-Doo. He claimed that giving up smoking had robbed him of the necessary rasp in his natural voice to voice him.

=== Retirement ===
In late September 1996, Messick retired from acting after he suffered a stroke at a recording session at Hanna-Barbera.

On October 12, 1996, he had a "retirement party" at his favorite Chinese restaurant (Joseph Barbera personally sent a limo to Messick and his wife, and the two were chauffeured). Many of his friends and peers during his career who had come to pay tribute to him included Henry Corden, Casey Kasem, Lucille Bliss, Maurice LaMarche, Gregg Berger, Neil Ross, June Foray, Sharon Mack, Greg Burson, Walker Edmiston, Marvin Kaplan, Gary Owens, Howard Morris, Teresa Ganzel, Jean Vander Pyl, and Myrtis Martin Butler (Daws' widow).

== Personal life and death ==
Messick married Helen McHugh on October 10, 1953, and they remained married until Messick's death on October 24, 1997. Together, they had one child.

Messick suffered a second stroke and died on October 24, 1997, in Salinas, California. He was 71 years old.

== Legacy ==
Since Messick's death in 1997, Hadley Kay, Scott Innes, Neil Fanning, and Frank Welker have all voiced the role of Scooby-Doo. In 1998, Scooby-Doo on Zombie Island was dedicated to his memory. In 2011, Jonathan Winters (who voiced Grandpa Smurf in the television series) became Messick's successor as the voice of Papa Smurf in The Smurfs and its 2013 sequel. Winters died after finishing his voice work on the latter film. In 2000, Billy West also became one of Messick's successors as the new voice of Muttley in the 2000 Dreamcast video game, the 2017 reboot of Wacky Races, and in the Scooby-Doo! animated film Scoob! which featured archive recordings of Messick for Muttley's laugh and a place named after him called "Messick Mountain". In 2010, Justin Timberlake and Tom Cavanagh became Messick's successors as voice of Boo Boo and the portrayed Ranger Smith in Yogi Bear.

== Filmography ==
=== Radio ===
Year	Title	Role	Notes	References
1941–43	Salisbury, MD			
1946	Spotlight Playhouse		"Genius From Hoboken"	
1946–47	The Raggedy Ann Show	Raggedy Andy		
1948	NBC University Theatre	Mouse	"Alice in Wonderland" (December 25, 1948)	
1949	Let George Do It	Mark Gumple the Contractor	"Out Of Mind"	
1965	Horizons West		"Down The Missouri To St. Louis"	

=== Films ===
Year	Title	Role	Notes
1949	The House of Tomorrow	Kitchen Narrator	Uncredited, reissue version only
1949	Wags To Riches	Droopy	Uncredited
1950	The Chump Champ	Droopy	Uncredited
1956	Millionaire Droopy	Droopy	Uncredited
1959–1965	Loopy De Loop	Hansel / Baby Gorilla / Jack / Cat / Hunter / Watchdog / Bounty Hunter / Farmer / Robin Hood / Farmer's Dog / Quincy / Quincy's Dog / Duke D. Hiss /	
1964	Hey There, It's Yogi Bear!	Boo-Boo Bear / Ranger Smith / Mugger	
1966	The Man Called Flintstone	Doctor / Additional voices	
1970	Pufnstuf	Freddy the Flute / Googy Gopher / Orson Vulture	
1971	The Andromeda Strain	Alarm Voice	
1971	Diamonds are Forever	Announcer at Circus Circus	Uncredited
1973	Charlotte's Web	Jeffrey / Lamb / Uncle / Bystanders	
1979	Rudolph and Frosty's Christmas in July	Sam Spangles	
1979	C.H.O.M.P.S.	Dog Snickering in Main Titles / TV Newsman	
1980	The Return of the King	Théoden / Easterling / The Mouth of Sauron	TV movie
1982	The Flight of Dragons	Giles of the Treetops / Lo Tae Zhao	
1982	The Last Unicorn	Additional voices	
1982	Case 35	Dinosaur (voice)	
1986	The Transformers: The Movie	Gears / Scavenger / Ratchet	Scenes deleted
1990	Jetsons: The Movie	Astro	
1992	Tiny Toon Adventures: How I Spent My Vacation	Hamton J. Pig / Radio Announcer	Voice, Direct-to-video film
1992	Tom and Jerry: The Movie	Droopy	
2020	Scoob!	Muttley, Spooky Space Kook	Posthumous release, archival recordings

=== Television ===
Year	Title	Role	Notes
1949–50	Buffalo Billy	Additional voices	
1951	The Aventures of Mr. Patches	Mr. Patches	
1952	Time For Beany	Narrator	
1953	Thunderbolt the Wondercolt	Additional voices	
1954	The Willy The Wolf Show	Additional voices	
1957–60	The Ruff and Reddy Show	Ruff / Professor Gizmo / Ubble Ubble / Additional voices	First work for Hanna-Barbera
1958–59	The Adventures of Spunky and Tadpole	Tadpole	First and Second Season
1958–62	The Huckleberry Hound Show	Pixie / Boo-Boo Bear / Ranger Smith / Narrator / Additional voices	
1959–62	The Quick Draw McGraw Show	Narrator / Horse-Face Harry / Sheriff / Additional voices	
1960–66	The Flintstones	Bamm-Bamm Rubble / Hoppy / Arnold / Additional voices	Seasons 2–6 (1961–1966)
1961–62	The Yogi Bear Show	Boo-Boo Bear / Ranger Smith / Major Minor / Narrator / Additional voices	
1961–62	Top Cat	Beau / Prowler / Dr. Dawson	
1961–62	The Alvin Show	Additional voices	
1962	Beany and Cecil	Crowy	1–2 episodes
1962	The New Hanna-Barbera Cartoon Series	Mr. Twiddle	
1962–63	The Jetsons	Astro / U.N.I.B.L.A.B. / M.A.C. / Additional voices	
1962–63	Wally Gator	Mr. Twiddle	
1964–66	The Magilla Gorilla Show	Mr. Peebles (1965–1966) / Additional voices	Replaced Howard Morris as Mr. Peebles (1965–1966)
1964–66	Peter Potamus	So-So / Additional voices	
1964	The Gumby Show	Henry / Rodgy / Additional voices	Dragon Witch, Treasure for Henry and Who's What
1964–65	Jonny Quest	Dr. Benton Quest / Bandit	replaced John Stephenson as Dr. Benton Quest after episode 9
1964	The Famous Adventures of Mr. Magoo	Additional voices	
1964–66	Ricochet Rabbit & Droop-a-Long	Ricochet Rabbit / Additional voices	
1965	The Secret Squirrel Show	Additional voices	
1965–67	The Atom Ant Show	Atom Ant / Precious Pupp / Shag Rugg / Additional voices	Replaced Howard Morris as Atom Ant
1965	The New Alice in Wonderland	Dormouse / Fluff	TV movie
1966–67	The Laurel and Hardy Cartoon Show	Additional voices	
1966–68	Frankenstein Jr. and The Impossibles	Multi-Man / Perilous Paper Doll Man / The Bubbler / Curly / Jesse James / Alexander the Great / Fero, The Fiendish Fiddler / Satanic Surfer / Terrible Twister / Ackbar / Martian / Anxious Angler / Crafty Clutcher / Bizarre Batter / Additional voices	
1966–68	Space Ghost	Blip / Zorak / Sisto / Bronty	
1966	The Space Kidettes	Countdown / Pup Star	
1967	Birdman and the Galaxy Trio	Falcon 7 / Vapor Man / Vultro / Additional voices	
1967	The Herculoids	Gloop / Gleep	
1967	Jack and the Beanstalk	Cat / Mice	TV movie (uncredited)
1967	Off to See the Wizard	Tin Man	
1967	Moby Dick and Mighty Mightor	Scooby the Seal	
1967	Super President	Additional voices	
1967	Fantastic Four	Kurrgo	
1967	Abbott & Costello	Additional voices	
1967	Shazzan	Kaboobie	
1967–68	Samson & Goliath	Goliath / Venusian Ice Men / Terrorist Leader / Monarch / Additional voices	
1968	The New Adventures of Huckleberry Finn	Priest / Tug	"The Magic Shillelah"
1968	La Feet's Defeat	Sergeant Deux-Deux	Short
1968–69	The Adventures of Gulliver	Eager / Tagg	
1968–69	The Archie Show	Jughead Jones, Hot Dog	1 episode
1968–69	The Banana Splits Adventure Hour	Zazuum / Prof. Carter / Aramis	
1968–69	Wacky Races	Muttley / Professor Pat Pending / Dum-Dum / Little Gruesome / Dragon / Gravel Slag	
1969	The Archie Comedy Hour	Harvey Kinkle / Spencer / Chili Dog	
1969–70	The Perils of Penelope Pitstop	Dum-Dum / Pockets / Zippy / Snoozy	
1969–70	Dastardly and Muttley in Their Flying Machines	Muttley / Klunk / Zilly / Yankee Doodle Pigeon / Muttley's Girlfriend	
1969–70	Scooby-Doo, Where Are You?	Scooby-Doo / Professor / Mr. Wickles / Ebenezer Shark / Mouse / Police Officer / Mr. Bluestone the Great / The Phantom / Hank / Buck Master's / Radio Voice / Indian Witch Doctor / Sharon's Father / Bulldog / John Maxwell / Parrot / Mr. Jenkins / Max / Midget / Mr. Barnstorm / University Professor / Witch / Zeb Perkins / Zeke Perkins / Space Kook / Henry Bascombe / Nephew Norville / Security Guard / Waiter / Policeman / Zombie / Chicks / Bank Guard / Mask Salesman / Professor Ingstrom / Roger Stevens / Mr. Grisby / Additional voices	
1969–71	Cattanooga Cats	Hoppy / Smirky	"Around the World in 79 Days" segment
1970	Where's Huddles?	Fumbles	
1970	Christmas Is	Additional voices	TV movie
1970	Doctor Dolittle	Additional voices	
1970–71	Josie and the Pussycats	Sebastian / Additional voices	
1970–74	Sabrina the Teenage Witch	Harvey Kinkle / Spencer / Chili Dog	Uncredited
1971	B.C. – The Shadow	Additional voices	Short
1971	The Pebbles and Bamm-Bamm Show	Schleprock / Weirdly Gruesome / Additional voices	
1971	Harlem Globetrotters	Additional voices	
1971	Help!... It's the Hair Bear Bunch!	Hercules / Hippo / Ambassador Of Ptomania / The Ambassador of Ptomania	"Gobs of Gabaloons"
1972	The Amazing Chan and the Chan Clan	Chu Chu the Dog	
1972	Wait Till Your Father Gets Home	Harry's Accountant	"Expectant Papa"
1972	Josie and the Pussycats in Outer Space	Sebastian / Bleep	
1972	The Flintstone Comedy Hour	Schleprock	
1972	The Barkleys	Additional voices	
1972	The Thanksgiving That Almost Wasn't	Additional voices	TV special
1972–73	The New Scooby-Doo Movies	Scooby-Doo / Ngogi / Sheriff / Businessman / Rock Festival Businessman / Captain Moody / Guard / Bridge Operator / Mr. Van Henstone / Slats / Matilda / Matt Hildago / Caley Burgess / Mr. Sawyer / Andrew Terra / Swampy Pete / Lieutenant Pete Dugan / Duke of Strathmore / Haunted Horseman / Cyrus Wheedly / Moat Monster / Sergeant / Professor Flakey / Sebastian / Captain Cannaby / Jack Canna / Ghost / Abdullah / Prince Abin / Clem Duncan / Mr. Franklin / Masked Marvel / Ghostly Strongman / Additional voices	
1972–73	The ABC Saturday Superstar Movie	Pastry Cook / House Agent / Midget / Brack / Gorgeous Cat / The Robot / Killer / Captain Parker / Trumpet / Second Cyclone / Additional voices	6 episodes
1973	Inch High, Private Eye	The Professor / The Mummy / Anchor / News Anchor / TV Reporter / Fat Frank / Paperboy	"The Mummy's Curse"
1973	The Addams Family	Additional voices	
1973	B.C.: The First Thanksgiving	Peter / Thor / Turkey	
1973	Jeannie	Additional voices	
1973	Yogi's Gang	Boo-Boo / Atom Ant / Squiddly Diddly / Touché Turtle / Ranger Smith / The Mayor of Smog City / Temper	
1973–75	Bailey's Comets	Gabby, Henry, Ringmaster, The Ringmaster, Coach	
1974	Hong Kong Phooey	Spot / The Mystery Maverick / Honcho / Additional voices	
1974–75	Wheelie and the Chopper Bunch	Scrambles / Officer Fishtail / Fire Chief / Ranger	
1975	The Tom & Jerry Show	Spike / Additional voices	Shared the role of Spike with Joe E. Ross
1975	The First Christmas: The Story of the First Christmas Snow	Additional voices	TV special
1975	The Tiny Tree	Additional voices	TV special
1975	The Oddball Couple	Additional voices	
1976	Jabberjaw	Jabberjaw /Lamp Salesman / Wizard / The Wizard	"Ali Jabber and the Secret Thieves"
1976	The First Easter Rabbit	Jonathan / Whiskers	TV special
1976	Rudolph's Shiny New Year	Papa Bear / Additional voices	TV special
1976–77	The Mumbly Cartoon Show	Mumbly / Lt. Nuts / Bolts	
1976–77	Dynomutt, Dog Wonder	Scooby-Doo / Lowbrow / Lowbrow's Henchman / Additional voices	"Everyone Hyde!" / "What Now, Lowbrow?" / "The Wizard of Ooze"
1976–78	The Scooby-Doo Show	Scooby-Doo / Construction Worker / Pa Skillett / Black Knight / Joe's Co-Worker / M. Dreyfus / Mr. Clive / Ferry Captain / Sheriff / Jim Moss / Racer / Pa Hatfield / Investor / Beach Hermit / Spider / Mario / Ghostly Gondolier / The Ghostly Gondolier / Additional voices	40 episodes
1977	CB Bears	Clyde The Ape	
1977	The Skatebirds	Scooter Penguin	
1977	Nestor the Long-Eared Christmas Donkey	Additional voices	TV special
1977	A Flintstone Christmas	Ed the Foreman / Otis	TV special
1977	The Hobbit	Balin / Goblin / Lord of the Eagles / Troll #3	TV special
1977	Kaptain Kool and the Kongs Present ABC All-Star Saturday	Scooby-Doo	TV movie
1977–78	Fred Flintstone and Friends	Various characters	
1977–79	Scooby's All-Star Laff-A-Lympics	Scooby-Doo, Boo Boo Bear, Mumbly, Pixie, Dastardly Dalton, Mr. Creepley, Junior Creepley, Announcer	
1977–80	Captain Caveman and the Teen Angels	Additional voices	
1978	Challenge of the Superfriends	Scarecrow / Additional voices	
1978	Dinky Dog	Additional voices	
1978	The Hanna-Barbera Happy Hour	Additional voices	
1978	Yogi's Space Race	Additional voices	
1978	Casper's First Christmas	Boo Boo	TV special
1978	The Flintstones: Little Big League	Quarry Worker	TV special
1978	Hanna-Barbera's All-Star Comedy Ice Revue	Scooby-Doo / Snorky / Jabberjaw	TV special
1978	The Fantastic Four	J.J. Colossal /Gorgon	
1978–79	Godzilla	Godzooky / Additional voices	
1978–83	The All New Popeye Hour	Eugene the Jeep	
1979	Amigo and Friends	Amigo (English dub)	
1979	The New Fred and Barney Show	Bamm-Bamm Rubble	
1979	The Super Globetrotters	Time Lord	
1979	Scooby Goes Hollywood	Scooby-Doo / Additional voices	TV special
1979	The Flintstones Meet Rockula and Frankenstone	Igor	TV special
1979	ABC Weekend Specials	Oscar Horse	"The Horse That Played Centerfield'"
1979	Gulliver's Travels		TV movie
1979	Jack Frost	Snip	TV special
1979–80	Scooby-Doo and Scrappy-Doo	Scooby-Doo / Night Ghoul / Mr. Kimber / Harris / Police Officer / Radio Voice / Conrad / Conjurer / Additional voices	
1980	Yogi's First Christmas	Boo-Boo Bear / Ranger Smith / Herman the Hermit	TV movie
1980	Space Stars	Astro / Gloop / Gleep	
1980	Pontoffel Pock, Where Are You?	Little Boy / Various Fairies	TV special
1980–82	The Flintstone Comedy Show	Schleprock	
1980–82	Scooby-Doo and Scrappy-Doo (1980 TV series)	Scooby-Doo / Scrappy-Doo / Yabba-Doo / Additional voices	
1980–82	Drak Pack	Toad, Fly	
1980–82	The Richie Rich/Scooby-Doo Show	Scooby-Doo / Scrappy-Doo	
1980	The Flintstones' New Neighbors	Bamm-Bamm Rubble / Vulture	TV special
1980	The Flintstones: Fred's Final Fling	Doctor / Fish #1 / Fish #2 / Parrot / Pigasaurus	TV special
1980–81	The Fonz and the Happy Days Gang	Additional voices	
1980–81	Heathcliff	Nobody, Sparerib, Mr. Post, Mr. Snyder	
1981	The Kwicky Koala Show	Clyde	
1981	The Flintstones: Wind-Up Wilma	Announcer	TV special
1981–89	The Smurfs	Papa Smurf / Azrael / Dreamy Smurf / Additional voices	
1982	My Smurfy Valentine	Papa Smurf / Azrael	TV special
1982	Pac Preview Party	Scooby-Doo / Scrappy-Doo	
1982–83	The Scooby & Scrappy-Doo/Puppy Hour	Scooby-Doo / Scrappy-Doo / Yabba-Doo / Additional voices	
1982–84	The Flintstone Funnies	Schleprock	Reruns of The Flintstone Comedy Show segments
1982	The Smurfs Springtime Special	Papa Smurf / Azrael	TV special
1982	Jokebook	Additional voices	
1982	Spider-Man	Vulture	
1982	The Smurfs Christmas Special	Papa Smurf / Azrael	TV special
1982	Yogi Bear's All Star Comedy Christmas Caper	Pixie / Boo-Boo / Ranger Smith	TV special
1983	The Smurfic Games	Papa Smurf / Azrael	TV special
1983–84	The New Scooby and Scrappy-Doo Show	Scooby-Doo / Scrappy-Doo / Bentley / Hound / Hugh Smallwood / Chairman Lewis / Chameleon / Dada-Doo / Mumsy-Doo / Additional voices	
1984	Laugh Busters	Papa Smurf	
1984	Strong Kids, Safe Kids	Papa Smurf / Scooby-Doo / Scrappy-Doo	Video Documentary Short
1984	The Duck Factory	Wally Wooster	First live action role
1984	The Mighty Orbots	Commander Rondu / Crunch	English dub
1984–87	The Transformers	Ratchet / Scavenger / Gears	
1984–85	The New Scooby-Doo Mysteries	Scooby-Doo / Scrappy-Doo / Gilly Stern / Pizza Concession Man / Max / Dada-Doo / Mumsy-Doo / Additional voices	
1984–85	Scary Scooby Funnies	Scooby-Doo / Scrappy-Doo	
1984	The Get Along Gang	Officer Growler / Mr. Hoofnagel / Mayor Bascombe Badger / Additional voices	
1985	The 13 Ghosts of Scooby-Doo	Scooby-Doo / Scrappy-Doo / Dr. Frankenscoob / Egad / Wacky Wizard / Dada-Doo / Mumsy-Doo / Additional voices	
1985	Galtar and the Golden Lance	Pandat	
1985	G.I. Joe: A Real American Hero	Professor	"Lasers in the Light"
1985	The Pound Puppies	Louie / Itchy	TV movie
1985–86	Scooby's Mystery Funhouse	Scooby-Doo / Scrappy-Doo	
1985–86	Paw Paws	PaPooch	
1985–87	The Berenstain Bears Show	Snuff the Dog	Animated adaptation of the Berenstain Bears children's books.
1985–87	The Jetsons	Astro / R.U.D.I. / U.N.I.B.L.A.B. / Additional voices	1980s revival of the original show
1985–88	Yogi's Treasure Hunt	Boo-Boo Bear / Ranger Smith / Ricochet Rabbit / Touche Turtle / Ruff	
1986	Smurfquest	Papa Smurf / Azrael	TV movie
1986	Here are the Smurfs	Papa Smurf	TV movie
1986–87	The New Adventures of Jonny Quest	Dr. Benton Quest / Bandit	
1986–87	Pound Puppies	Red Alert Pup	
1986–87	Foofur	Pepe	
1987	Popeye and Son	Eugene the Jeep	
1987	DuckTales	Scrooge's Father	"Once Upon a Dime"
1987	Tis The Season to Be Smurfy	Papa Smurf / Chitter	TV special
1987	The Real Ghostbusters	Walt Fleischman	"Who're You Calling Two-Dimensional?"
1987	The Jetsons Meet the Flintstones	R.U.D.I.	TV movie
1987	Yogi Bear and the Magical Flight of the Spruce Goose	Boo-Boo / Mumbly	TV movie
1987	Yogi's Great Escape	Boo-Boo / Ranger Smith	TV movie
1987	Scooby-Doo Meets the Boo Brothers	Scooby-Doo / Scrappy-Doo	TV movie
1988	Scooby-Doo and the Ghoul School	Scooby-Doo / Scrappy-Doo	TV movie
1988	Scooby-Doo and the Reluctant Werewolf	Scooby-Doo / Scrappy-Doo	TV movie
1988	Rockin' with Judy Jetson	Astro	TV movie
1988	Yogi and the Invasion of the Space Bears	Boo-Boo Bear / Ranger Smith	TV movie
1988	The Good, the Bad, and Huckleberry Hound	Boo-Boo Bear / Narrator	TV movie
1988	Fantastic Max	King Klutzes	"Stitches in Time"
1988	The New Yogi Bear Show	Boo-Boo Bear / Ranger Smith	
1988–91	A Pup Named Scooby-Doo	Scooby-Doo / Scooby-Doo's Dad / Jenkins / News Anchor / Additional voices	
1989	Hanna-Barbera's 50th: A Yabba Dabba Doo Celebration	Scooby-Doo / Droopy / Astro / Boo-Boo Bear / Ranger Smith / Additional voices	TV special
1989	The 16th Annual Daytime Emmy Awards	Papa Smurf	TV special
1990	Cartoon All-Stars to the Rescue	Papa Smurf	TV short
1990–91	The Adventures of Don Coyote and Sancho Panda	Sancho Panda	
1990–92	Wake, Rattle, and Roll	Boo-Boo Bear / Pixie / Muttley / Lucky the Cat	
1990–93	Tom and Jerry Kids	Droopy / Bat Mouse / Additional voices	
1990–95	Tiny Toon Adventures	Hamton J. Pig / Additional voices	
1991	Bobby's World	Narrator and Ranger	"Bobby's Big Broadcast"
1991	Yo Yogi!	Boo-Boo Bear / Muttley / Atom Ant/ Pixie	
1991	The Last Halloween	Romtu	TV special
1992	The Plucky Duck Show	Hamton J. Pig	
1993	Bonkers	The Mayor	"The Good, The Bad, and the Kanifky"
1993–94	Droopy, Master Detective	Droopy / Additional voices	
1993–94	Garfield and Friends	Additional voices	
1993	I Yabba-Dabba Do!	Policeman	TV movie
1993	Hollyrock-a-Bye Baby	Baby Bamm-Bamm Rubble / Lot Security Guard / Tour Bus Driver	TV movie
1993	Jonny's Golden Quest	Dr. Benton C. Quest / Bandit	TV movie
1994	Yogi the Easter Bear	Boo-Boo Bear / Ranger Smith	TV movie
1994	Scooby-Doo in Arabian Nights	Scooby-Doo / Boo-Boo Bear	TV movie
1994	A Flintstones Christmas Carol	Bamm-Bamm Rubble / Joe Rockhead	TV movie
1994	Tiny Toons Spring Break	Hamton J. Pig	TV special
1994	Yogi the Easter Bear	Boo-Boo Bear / Ranger Smith	TV special
1994	The Flintstones: Wacky Inventions	Bamm-Bamm Rubble	Short
1995	Tiny Toons' Night Ghoulery	Hamton J. Pig / TV Executive	TV special
1995	2 Stupid Dogs	Corporal	"Cartoon Canines"
1995	Jonny Quest vs. The Cyber Insects	Dr. Benton C. Quest / Bandit	TV movie
1995	Freakazoid!	Dr. Vernon Danger	"Toby Danger in Doomsday Bet"
1996	Burger King Commercial	Scooby-Doo	Commercial
1996	The Real Adventures of Jonny Quest	Dr. Benton C. Quest	Episodes: "The Dark Mountain", "The Mummies of Malenque", "Ndovu's Last Journey"
2010–13	Scooby-Doo! Mystery Incorporated	Scooby-Doo Laugh	Archive Recordings

=== Video games ===
Year	Title	Role	Notes
1992	King's Quest VI	Ali, Gnomes	
1995	Scooby-Doo Mystery	Scooby-Doo	

=== Theme park attractions ===
Year	Title	Role	Notes
1990	The Funtastic World of Hanna-Barbera	Scooby-Doo/Muttley/Boo-Boo	

Preceded by None	Voice of Bamm-Bamm Rubble; 1963–1996	Succeeded by Gerry Johnson
Preceded by None	Voice of Papa Smurf; 1981–1990	Succeeded by Bill Capizzi; Michael Sorich
Preceded by None	Voice of Boo Boo Bear; 1958–1996	Succeeded by Billy West
Preceded by Daws Butler	Voice of Ranger Smith; 1959–1996	Succeeded by Greg Burson
Preceded by None	Voice of Muttley; 1968–1991, 2020; Scoob!, archival laugh recordings	Succeeded by Billy West
Preceded by None	Voice of Scooby-Doo; 1969–1996	Succeeded by Frank Welker
Preceded by Lennie Weinrib	Voice of Scrappy-Doo; 1980–1988	Succeeded by Scott Innes
Preceded by None	Voice of Astro; 1962–1990	Succeeded by Wally Wingert
