= List of Wacky Races (2017 TV series) episodes =

The following is a list of episodes from the 2017 series Wacky Races.

== Series overview ==
Season	Episodes	Originally released	
Season	Episodes	First released	Last released
1	40	August 14, 2017	May 31, 2018
2	38	November 29, 2018	November 24, 2019

== Episodes ==
=== Season 1 (2017–18) ===
No. overall	No. in season	Title	Directed by	Written by	Original release date	Prod. code
1	1	"Ya Win Some, Ya Luge Some"	Matt Whitlock	Story by : Matt Craig; Teleplay by : Michael Ludy	August 14, 2017	101
The Racers participate in the Wacky Winter Games and compete in luge, ski jump, slalom and snowboarding events. The games culminate in a final competition, where Dastardly and Muttley do a very disturbing ice-skating dance.
2	2	"Mambo Itali-Go-Go"	Jeff Siergey	Mike Disa	August 31, 2017	102
While stopping at a small Italian town for gas, the Racers are recognized by the citizens, who invite them for a small party in their town. Unfortunately for the Racers, they are unable to leave the town, as the citizens consciously throw parties and feed them.
3	3	"So Far to Mardi Gras"	Mike Disa and Matt Whitlock	Rob Janas	August 31, 2017	103
The Racers, joined by guest Racer Pandora Pitstop, race customized watercraft through the Louisiana bayous.
4	4	"Easter Express"	Mike Disa and Scott O'Brien	Story by : Rob Janas; Teleplay by : Mike Disa	August 31, 2017	104
The residents of Easter Island celebrate an ancient festival with a Wacky Race. The Racers end up awakening a giant alien menace that awakes the slumbering Easter Island statues to conquer the world, unless Muttley can stop them.
5	5	"Race-a-Lot"	Scott O'Brien and Jeff Siergey	Story by : Mike Disa; Teleplay by : Mike Disa and Amy Wolfram	August 31, 2017	127
Medieval Camelot has never been so exciting, or so wacky!
6	6	"Peter Imperfect"	Matt Whitlock	Story by : Mike Disa; Teleplay by : Todd Ludy	August 31, 2017	107
Peter and Dastardly are caught in the explosion of I. Q.'s latest invention, where Peter loses his mojo, but Dastardly has absorbed Peter's perfectness and refuses to give it up unless Peter's friends can find Dastardly and make Peter perfect again.
7	7	"Yes, We Canyon"	Scott O'Brien and Jeff Siergey	Story by : Matt Craig; Teleplay by : Adam Beechen	August 31, 2017	126
On vacation, the Racers' competitive attitudes overwhelm each other to the point where they end up destroying the Grand Canyon.
8	8	"Roamin' Racers"	Matt Whitlock	Story by : Mike Disa; Teleplay by : Rob Janas	August 31, 2017	106
The Racers take the roles of ancient Roman chariot racers during the very wacky version of the Roman games.
9	9	"Smokey and the Racers"	Matt Whitlock	Kevin Fleming	August 31, 2017	105
The Racers drive through the Deep South, until they run afoul of Dastardly's crooked cousin Sheriff Longarm D. Lawe. Captured by his speed traps, the Racers are sentenced to 847 years in the local jail and must find a way to escape and finish the race.
10	10	"Raceketeers"	Mike Disa	Story by : Mike Disa; Teleplay by : Jennifer Muro	August 31, 2017	108
Penelope, Peter, Tiny and Bella take the roles of the Three Musketeers in a wacky and action-packed version of The Man in the Iron Mask.
11	11	"Fantastic Race"	Jeff Siergey	Mike Disa	August 31, 2017	109
Shrunk down to microscopic size, the Racers are accidentally injected into Dastardly and must race through his circulatory system, avoiding his white blood cells, to find a way out before they enlarge inside him.
12	12	"Space Race"	Scott O'Brien	Story by : Mike Disa; Teleplay by : Mike Disa and Rob Janas	August 31, 2017	113
A thousand years in the future, the Wacky Races are alive and well and even wackier than ever!
13	13	"Backseat Drivers"	Mike Disa	Story by : Matt Craig; Teleplay by : Mike Disa and Dave Polsky	September 28, 2017	112
The Racers have always been curious about the mysterious Doombuggy, in which the Gruesome Twosome apparently live in the trunk. The Racers sneak inside and find themselves trapped in a gigantic Halloween wonderland and pursued by familiar monsters.
14	14	"Off Track"	Matt Whitlock	Story by : Kevin Fleming; Teleplay by : Mike Disa and Kevin Fleming	December 21, 2017	110
Peter and his friends race back to Peter's hometown of Perfectville and find out that it is not so perfect after all.
15	15	"Cave Racers"	Mike Disa	Story by : Matt Wayne; Teleplay by : Mike Disa	December 21, 2017	111
A trip back in time reveals the very first Wacky Race, as prehistoric versions of the Racers race through a prehistoric landscape while evading hungry dinosaurs.
16	16	"Guru My Dreams"	Matt Whitlock	Mike Disa	December 21, 2017	114
With the help of a very unusual spiritual adviser, the Racers find themselves racing through their collective unconscious dream world encountering their fondest fantasies, or in the case of Dastardly, a deeply screwed-up mess of a psyche.
17	17	"Cold Rush"	Mike Disa and Jeff Siergey	Mike Disa and Jeff Siergey	December 21, 2017	115
Before a race to the South Pole, Peter challenges Dastardly to win just one race fair and square. As they roar across Antarctica, they encounter dangerous booby traps.
18	18	"It's a Wacky Life"	Karina Gazizova	Story by : Mike Disa; Teleplay by : Michael DeGrandis	November 30, 2017	120
During a Wacky Races Christmas party, Dastardly triggers his latest tricks and finds himself in Heaven, reviewing his past misdeeds with a familiar angel named Maurice.
19	19	"Pretzel Logic"	Mike Disa	Mike Disa	December 21, 2017	116
Dastardly's Bavarian cousin Desdemona captures the Racers during a competition over the Alps and locks them in her pretzel mines.
20	20	"Dashing Thru the Snow"	Karina Gazizova	Mike Disa	November 30, 2017	117
During a race to the North Pole, the Racers accidentally run over Santa Claus and now must take his place to save Christmas.
21	21	"Formula Racing"	Matt Whitlock	Story by : Matt Craig; Teleplay by : Mike Disa and Michael Ludy	December 21, 2017	118
The Racers are turned into babies, with Dastardly as their babysitter.
22	22	"Unraceable"	Matt Whitlock	Story by : Mike Disa; Teleplay by : Jennifer Muro	December 21, 2017	119
Fed up with Dick Dastardly's unorthodox and surreal ways of cheating, P. T. Barnstorm decides to fire and ban Dastardly from the Wacky Races, forcing Dastardly to find a new career.
23	23	"Sister, Twister"	Matt Whitlock	Story by : Mike Disa; Teleplay by : Jennifer Muro	December 21, 2017	121
Pandora switches places with her twin sister Penelope in order to steal a prize for good sportsmanship and fair play.
24	24	"Mars Needs Racers"	Matt Whitlock	Story by : Adam Beechen; Teleplay by : Mike Disa	December 21, 2017	122
P. T. Barnstorm's latest money-making race event sends the Racers off to race on Mars against an evil space tyrant, with Earth as the prize.
25	25	"Race to the Bottom"	Curt Geda	Story by : Ray DeLaurentis; Teleplay by : Mike Disa and Jennifer Muro	December 21, 2017	124
As the race continues through the center of the Earth to the Land that Time Forgot, the Racers are attacked by dinosaurs, but are rescued at the last second by a tribe of mole people that crown Muttley their king.
26	26	"Do Over Dastardly"	Ron Rubio	Story by : Matt Craig; Teleplay by : Mike Disa and Kevin Fleming	December 21, 2017	123
An experimental time machine created by I. Q. gives Dastardly the ability to rewind time 30 seconds at a time.
27	27	"Swap Meet"	Matt Whitlock	Story by : Mike Disa; Teleplay by : Matt Wayne	May 10, 2018	125
As the Racers zoom through the bluegrass hills of Kentucky, another one of I. Q.'s inventions begins randomly exchanging the Racers' personalities meaning is switching bodies.
28	28	"Mother Drives Best"	Ron Rubio	Story by : Mike Disa; Teleplay by : Ed Valentine	May 8, 2018	128
At an annual race where their mothers accompany each of the Racers, their maternal relationship is painfully explored, until the moms get caught up in the race and leave the Racers in the dust.
29	29	"Race Against Time"	Karina Gazizova	Story by : Amy Wolfram; Teleplay by : Mike Disa and Amy Wolfram	December 21, 2017	130
I. Q. has been secretly working on a time machine to make time and the Racers' cars go faster. It backfires and brings future versions of the Racers back to advise their younger selves.
30	30	"My Fair Tiny"	Matt Whitlock	Story by : Mike Disa; Teleplay by : Amy Wolfram	December 21, 2017	129
Tiny receives an invitation to speak at his old high school. Tiny does not want to go because he will not fit in well at Miss Prissy Prisswell's Finishing School for Young Ladies, Gentlemen and Others.
31	31	"Under the Rainbow"	Matt Whitlock	Story by : Matt Craig; Teleplay by : Mike Disa	March 15, 2018	134
A raucous race across the Emerald Isle runs afoul of a clan of leprechauns determined to protect their pot o' gold. Note: The Slag Brothers make a cameo in this episode.
32	32	"Wacky Spaces"	Ron Rubio	Story by : Michael Ludy; Teleplay by : Mike Disa and Michael Ludy	May 31, 2018	132
A thousand years in the future, the Wacky Races are alive and well and even wackier than ever!
33	33	"The Perils of Peter Perfect"	Matt Whitlock	Story by : Michael Ludy; Teleplay by : Mike Disa	May 31, 2018	133
The Racers swing into action to save Peter, who has been kidnapped by a crazy fan. Note: The title episode is a reference to The Perils of Penelope Pitstop.
34	34	"People Who Need Purple"	Matt Whitlock	Story by : Dave Polsky; Teleplay by : Mike Disa and Michael Ludy	May 31, 2018	131
Dastardly is tired of his rivals and goes to a dimension where everyone is like him. He then finds himself unable to keep up with his rivals, who are cheaters like him.
35	35	"Race to Infinity"	Mike Disa	Mike Disa	May 31, 2018	135
In the far future, brave, if not too bright, space ranger Peter Perfect entrusts the secret location to the galaxy's greatest weapon to speeder racer Penelope Spacestop. But can she and her android friends keep evil Lord Dastarius from finding it and conquering the universe?
36	36	"His Way or the Highway"	Karina Gazizova	Mike Disa	May 31, 2018	137
Dastardly buys a lamp with a genie inside, in spite of the salesman's warning about the twists that usually come with the wishes, and uses the first wish to make his rivals behave just like him.
37	37	"Racer Roundup"	Matt Whitlock	Mike Disa	May 31, 2018	136
A Western-themed race ends up to be more than the Racers bargained for.
38	38	"Grandfather Knows Dast"	Matt Whitlock	Story by : Kevin Kramer; Teleplay by : Mike Disa	May 31, 2018	139
Under pressure from his grandfather to finally win at least one race, Dastardly pulls out all the stops with a barrage of tricks and traps. They all backfire, so Penelope convinces the other Racers to let Dastardly win.
39	39	"Hong Kong Screwy"	Matt Whitlock	Story by : Mike Disa; Teleplay by : Michael Ludy	May 31, 2018	138
The Racers meet up with Hong Kong Phooey during a thrilling adventure in China, where the evil organization K.I.T.T.Y., led by Golden Paw, mistakes Muttley for Hong Kong Phooey. Note: Like Hong Kong Phooey (who was voiced by Phil LaMarr voice-matching Scatman Crothers), Huckleberry Hound (who was voiced by Billy West) also makes a cameo appearance in this episode. Also, this can be a crossover episode between Hong Kong Phooey and The Huckleberry Hound Show.
40	40	"40 Yard Dash"	Karina Gazizova	Story by : Matt Craig; Teleplay by : Mike Disa	May 31, 2018	140
To celebrate the 40th race of the Wacky Races, it was decided that this race would be only a 40-yard race. However, unexpected events prevent the Racers from finishing the race.

=== Season 2 (2018–19) ===
No. overall	No. in season	Title	Directed by	Written by	Original release date	Prod. code
41	1	"Dickie and the Race-a-nauts"	Karina Gazizova	Story by : Mike Disa; Teleplay by : Michael DeGrandis and Mike Disa	October 29, 2018 (Canada); November 29, 2018 (United States)	141
In the ancient time of legendary heroes, the Wacky Racers race to find the Golden Fleece before the terrible Pluto (Dastardly) and Cerberus (Muttley) do.
42	2	"Uncle Dickie's Happy Sunshine Children's Hour"	Matt Whitlock	Story by : Mike Disa; Teleplay by : Mike Disa and Michael Ludy	October 29, 2018 (Canada); November 29, 2018 (United States)	142
To improve his terrible image, Dastardly is forced by the network to host a morning pre-school kiddie show with the help of his friends.
43	3	"Peter 2.0"	Mike Disa	Mike Disa	October 29, 2018 (Canada); November 29, 2018 (United States)	143
When Hollywood lures Peter away to a life of fame and fortune, he is replaced in the Wacky Races by an insane, but very handsome robot.
44	4	"Little Pink Riding Hood"	Karina Gazizova	Story by : Mike Disa; Teleplay by : Mike Disa and Jennifer Muro	October 29, 2018 (Canada); November 29, 2018 (United States)	144
The Racers zoom through an enchanted forest on the way to Granny's house with the help of guest Racer Winsome Witch.
45	5	"Punky Races"	Matt Whitlock	Story by : Mike Disa; Teleplay by : Michael Ludy	October 29, 2018 (Canada); November 29, 2018 (United States)	145
To celebrate the Queen's Golden Jubilee, our Victorian Racers compete using the latest in steam-powered automotive vehicles, until Dickie reveals his plan to take over 19th century England by queen-napping Victoria.
46	6	"Ragnarok & Roll"	Karina Gazizova	Story by : Mike Disa; Teleplay by : Michael Ludy	October 29, 2018 (Canada); November 29, 2018 (United States)	146
Thor, God of Thunder challenges a crazed team of berserker Viking Racers to sail across the dangerous sea and discover America...which they do, when they can be troubled to stop smiting everything they see.
47	7	"Wacklantis"	Matt Whitlock	Story by : Kevin Fleming; Teleplay by : Mike Disa and Michael Ludy	October 29, 2018 (Canada); November 29, 2018 (United States)	147
The Racers are shanghaied by the king of the underwater city of Atlantis to race his vain and spoiled son through the depths of the Marianas Trench.
48	8	"Game On"	Karina Gazizova	Story by : Matt Wayne; Teleplay by : Mike Disa	October 29, 2018 (Canada); November 29, 2018 (United States)	148
Pandora traps the Racers in their own video game, where the only way to escape is to win the race.
49	9	"Much Ado About Wacky"	Mike Disa	Story by : Mike Disa; Teleplay by : Mike Disa and Jennifer Muro	October 29, 2018 (Canada); November 29, 2018 (United States)	149
In the most cultured episode of Wacky Races ever, Dastardly devotes an entire show to acting out the works of William Shakespeare with the help of the other Racers.
50	10	"Far Away in Old Bombay"	Karina Gazizova	Story by : Dave Polsky; Teleplay by : Mike Disa and Dave Polsky	October 29, 2018 (Canada); November 29, 2018 (United States)	150
In a homage to Bollywood musicals, the Racers zoom through Mumbai in an effort to bring two star-crossed lovers from feuding families together.
51	11	"The Wacky Always Races Twice"	Jeff Siergey	Story by : Mike Disa; Teleplay by : Janna King	October 29, 2018 (Canada); November 29, 2018 (United States)	151
Hard-boiled 1930's private detective Bad Penny Pitstop is hired to track down Peter's stolen lunchbox in a race against Dastardly and the Gruesome Twosome.
52	12	"Mummy Madness"	Matt Whitlock	Story by : Mike Disa; Teleplay by : Michael Ludy	October 29, 2018 (Canada); November 29, 2018 (United States)	152
A race through the Sahara Desert to the Pyramids of Giza leads the Racers to uncover ancient aliens' plot to conquer the world.
53	13	"King Solomon's Races"	Karina Gazizova	Story by : Mike Disa; Teleplay by : Michael Ludy	October 29, 2018 (Canada); November 29, 2018 (United States)	201
Deep in the heart of Africa, the Racers and guest Racer Pandora Pitstop get trapped in the labyrinthine and trap-laden mines of King Solomon.
54	14	"The Trial of Dick Dastardly"	Matt Whitlock	Mike Disa	October 29, 2018 (Canada); November 29, 2018 (United States)	202
After Dastardly's cheating goes too far, he is banned from the Wacky Races by the creators of the original show. His friends do their best to defend him before a jury of the worst cartoon villains ever. The Hooded Claw from The Perils of Penelope Pitstop serves as the prosecutor.
55	15	"The Wack Stuff"	Mike Disa	Story by : Mike Disa; Teleplay by : Michael Ludy	October 29, 2018 (Canada); November 29, 2018 (United States)	203
Penelope is kidnapped by aliens and forced to compete in a space race against strange but oddly familiar aliens and only Space Ghost can save us all.
56	16	"Dog Gone Dastardly"	Jeff Siergey	Story by : Phil LaMarr; Teleplay by : Mike Disa and Phil LaMarr	October 29, 2018 (Canada); November 29, 2018 (United States)	204
When a bolt of lightning rewires Dastardly's brain so everyone he sees looks like Muttley, the Racers must dare to travel to the most horrible, dangerous, despicable, awful place in the universe...Dastardly's mind.
57	17	"The Purple Ray from Outer Space"	Mike Disa	Story by : Mike Disa; Teleplay by : Mike Disa and Phil LaMarr	October 29, 2018 (Canada); November 29, 2018 (United States)	205
In a homage to 1930's space adventures, brave two-fisted American hero Peter Perfect and his friends takes a trip to Pluto to stop the evil space emperor Dastardly from conquering Earth.
58	18	"The Attack of the Mega-Muttley"	Matt Whitlock	Story by : Mike Disa; Teleplay by : Michael DeGrandis and Mike Disa	October 29, 2018 (Canada); November 29, 2018 (United States)	206
During a race through Japan, another of Dastardly's schemes gone wrong causes Muttley to grow into a giant monster and attack downtown Tokyo. With I. Q.'s help, the Racers build a super-cool mega mecha to take on the rampaging pooch.
59	19	"Wackier than Fiction"	Jeff Siergey	Mike Disa	October 29, 2018 (Canada); November 29, 2018 (United States)	207
The Racers find themselves in Storyland with all the greatest characters of fiction, where they struggle to prove they are real people (and not badly written cartoon characters) so they can return to reality.
60	20	"Never Too Old to Wacky"	Matt Whitlock	Story by : Mike Disa; Teleplay by : Mike Disa and Janna King	October 29, 2018 (Canada); November 29, 2018 (United States)	208
When I. Q. accidentally ages the Racers into their 80s, they are retired to an elder care storage facility in Florida, where the Racers prove you are never too old to cause complete wacky chaos.
61	21	"Wacky Wizards"	Karina Gazizova	Story by : Mike Disa; Teleplay by : Michael Ludy	October 29, 2018 (Canada); November 29, 2018 (United States)	209
The evil wizard Lord Dast enlists his army of flying Muttleys to steal a powerful pendant from the good-natured Penelope Peasant. With the help of the other Racers, Penelope embarks on a quest to save their magical world.
62	22	"Super Wacky"	Karina Gazizova	Andrew Guastaferro	October 29, 2018 (Canada); November 29, 2018 (United States)	210
The super-city of Wackopolis is thrown into peril when the supervillain the Purple Puppeteer executes a foul scheme to outlaw the city's heroes. Can the Super Racers stop him?
63	23	"Wack to the Future"	Jeff Siergey	Story by : Michael Ludy; Teleplay by : Mike Disa and Jordan Gershowitz	October 29, 2018 (Canada); November 29, 2018 (United States)	211
When the future version of Dastardly returns from the future to alter history, the Racers and our Dastardly battle to reset time and save the world.
64	24	"Signed, Sealed and Wacky"	Matt Whitlock	Story by : Mike Disa; Teleplay by : Mike Disa and Michael Ludy	October 29, 2018 (Canada); November 29, 2018 (United States)	212
When evil penguins capture Santa Claus, the Racers are recruited by Mrs. Claus to save him.
65	25	"Wacky Races: The Movie!"	Karina Gazizova	Story by : Mike Disa; Teleplay by : Mike Disa and Michael Ludy	October 29, 2018 (Canada); November 29, 2018 (United States)	213
A movie executive from Wacky Brothers Studios hires the Racers to star in a big budget action-filled movie version of their adventures, complete with zombies, mutant vampires, aliens and even worse...Hollywood directors and writers.
66	26	"Catastrophe"	Karina Gazizova	Story by : Mike Disa; Teleplay by : Mike Disa and Michael Ludy	October 21, 2019; November 24, 2019 (Boomerang app)	214
Dastardly's penchant for cat-based weaponry and traps finally cat-ches up with him when he is transported into a distant future world ruled entirely by cats.
67	27	"Brains Before Brawn"	Matt Whitlock	Story by : Mike Disa; Teleplay by : Michael Ludy	October 21, 2019; November 24, 2019 (Boomerang app)	215
Tiny's creator returns to town with a special gift: the missing half of Tiny's brain! When his newfound intelligence goes straight to his head, the Racers grow tired of his arrogant attitude and team up to steal back half of his brain.
68	28	"Double the Dastardly"	Andy Thom	Story by : Mike Disa; Teleplay by : Mike Disa and Michael Ludy	October 21, 2019; November 24, 2019 (Boomerang app)	216
In a parody of The Prince and the Pauper, the Racers attend a race for a royal coronation, where Dastardly meets his doppelganger, the prince of the country.
69	29	"Wackyland"	Matt Whitlock	Story by : Andrew Guastaferro; Teleplay by : Mike Disa and Andrew Guastaferro	October 21, 2019; November 24, 2019 (Boomerang app)	217
The Racers visit the amusement park "Wackyland" when Peter is kidnapped by an evil genius who aims for world domination.
70	30	"Curses, Foiled Again"	Karina Gazizova	Michael Ludy	October 21, 2019; November 24, 2019 (Boomerang app)	218
After Dastardly finally wins a race despite using his usual nefarious deeds, he also wins a cursed idol, which brings him bad luck.
71	31	"Double Trouble"	Matt Whitlock	Michael Ludy	October 21, 2019; November 24, 2019 (Boomerang app)	219
Dastardly meets the only member of his fan club, a 6-year-old girl, except that she is meaner and more deceitful than he is and wants to challenge him to a race to see who is the best cheater of all.
72	32	"Slow and Steady"	Karina Gazizova	Story by : Janna King; Teleplay by : Mike Disa	October 21, 2019; November 24, 2019 (Boomerang app)	220
In a race through the Appalachian Mountains, the Racers compete against various guest stars Huckleberry Hound, Ricochet Rabbit and Touché Turtle. Note: Snagglepuss makes a cameo at the end of the episode.
73	33	"The Scarlet Pinkernel"	Karina Gazizova	Mike Disa	October 21, 2019; November 24, 2019 (Boomerang app)	221
The Racers star as the lords and ladies of Enlightenment-era England and are challenged to sneak off to France and smuggle a French aristocrat back to London.
74	34	"Troy and Troy Again"	Andy Thom	Story by : Mike Disa; Teleplay by : Mike Disa and Peter Woodward	October 21, 2019; November 24, 2019 (Boomerang app)	222
In a parody of Homer's Iliad, Brick Crashman tells the story of the Trojan War with the help of the Racers.
75	35	"What a Wacky Development This Is!"	Matt Whitlock	Story by : Mike Disa; Teleplay by : Mike Disa and Janna King	October 21, 2019; November 24, 2019 (Boomerang app)	223
The Racers and the new Wacky Network executive must try to come up with a brainstorm to change the format of the show to attract a younger, hipper demographic.
76	36	"I, Race Car"	Karina Gazizova	Story by : Andrew Guastaferro; Teleplay by : Mike Disa and Jennifer Muro	October 21, 2019; November 24, 2019 (Boomerang app)	224
Dastardly's attempt to upgrade his car has caused all the other Racers' cars to gain consciousness and free will.
77	37	"Muttleys Are Forever"	Matt Whitlock	Part 1: Michael Ludy Part 2:Story by : Michael Ludy; Teleplay by : Mike Disa and Michael Ludy	October 21, 2019; November 24, 2019 (Boomerang app)	225
78	38	"Never Say Muttley Again "	Matt Whitlock	Part 1: Michael Ludy Part 2:Story by : Michael Ludy; Teleplay by : Mike Disa and Michael Ludy	October 21, 2019; November 24, 2019 (Boomerang app)	226
After discovering that Muttley lives a double life as a Secret Agent, Dick Dastardly tags along with him and Agent Z to stop the evil Dr. Doomsdoctor as he devises a plan to make the moon come to earth. Note: This is a half–hour series finale.
