= The Peter Potamus Show =

American animated television series

- Peter Potamus and So-So in their Magic Flying Balloon.
- Also known as: The Peter Potamus Show; Peter Potamus and His Magic Flying Balloon
- Genre: Comedy; Adventure
- Created by: William Hanna; Joseph Barbera
- Written by: Tony Benedict; Warren Foster; Dalton Sandifer
- Directed by: William Hanna; Joseph Barbera
- Voices of: Daws Butler; Doug Young; Hal Smith; Don Messick; Howard Morris; Mel Blanc; John Stephenson
- Composer: Hoyt Curtin
- Country of origin: United States
- Original language: English
- No. of episodes: 27

Production
- Producers: William Hanna; Joseph Barbera
- Running time: 22–26 minutes
- Production company: Hanna-Barbera Productions

Original release
- Network: Syndication; ABC
- Release: September 16, 1964 – October 23, 1966

Related
- The Magilla Gorilla Show

The Peter Potamus Show is an American animated television series produced by Hanna-Barbera Productions and starring Peter Potamus, a purple hippopotamus.

The Peter Potamus Show is divided into three segments: Peter Potamus and So-So, Breezly and Sneezly and Yippee, Yappee and Yahooey. Peter Potamus was broadcast as a companion series to The Magilla Gorilla Show. Both series premiered in first-run syndication before being picked up by ABC in January 1966. Peter Potamus ran on Sunday mornings and The Magilla Gorilla Show went to Saturday mornings before moving to Sundays the following year. At that time, the Breezly and Sneezly segment was swapped with Ricochet Rabbit & Droop-a-Long, a segment on The Magilla Gorilla Show. After the ABC run ended in 1967, cartoons from Magilla Gorilla and Peter Potamus shows were syndicated together.

The Ideal Toy Company sponsored the television series, and during the original run of the cartoon, the theme song ended with the phrase: "And there he goes Peter Potamus, our ideal". A similarly subtle sponsor reference appeared in the Magilla Gorilla theme song lyrics: "He's really ideal". Early promotional materials for the series carried the title Peter Potamus and His Magic Flying Balloon, but that title never appeared on screen. The original Peter Potamus series was broadcast on the cable TV channel Boomerang, often as part of its anthology series Boomerang Zoo. It is currently airing on-and-off on the over-the-air antenna channel, MeTV Toons.

== Plot and segments ==
=== Peter Potamus and So-So ===
The main segment features Peter Potamus (voiced by Daws Butler impersonating Joe E. Brown; Butler uses an identical voice for Lippy the Lion) and his diminutive sidekick So-So the monkey (voiced by Don Messick). Peter is big, purple, and friendly, dressed in a safari jacket and hat. Episodes generally consist of Peter and So-So exploring the world in his hot air balloon, which has a gondola shaped like a boat and is capable of time travel at the spin of a dial. When faced with a precarious situation, Peter uses his “Hippo Hurricane Holler”—a tremendous surge of wind from his mouth to blow away his opponents.

=== Breezly and Sneezly ===
A polar bear named Breezly Bruin (voiced by Howard Morris) and his friend Sneezly Seal (voiced by Mel Blanc) use various schemes to break into an army camp in the frozen north, while trying to stay one step ahead of the camp's leader Colonel Fuzzby (voiced by John Stephenson).

=== Yippee, Yappee and Yahooey ===
Three dogs named Yippee (voiced by Doug Young), Yappee (voiced by Hal Smith) and Yahooey (voiced by Daws Butler impersonating Jerry Lewis), a.k.a. The Goofy Guards, work for the King (voiced by Hal Smith), a short, complaining ruler who is often on the receiving end of their antics. The trio's plumed hats and swords are reminiscent of The Three Musketeers.

== Episodes ==
#	Plot	Original air date
1	Fee Fi Fo Fun; No Place like Nome; The Volunteers	September 16, 1964
2	Lion Around; All Riot on the Northern Front; Black Bart	September 23, 1964
3	Cleo Trio; Missile Fizzle; Double Dragon	October 7, 1964
4	No Rest for a Pest; Mass Masquerade; Outlaw In-law	October 7, 1964
5	Wagon Train Strain; Furry Furlough; Horse Shoo Fly	October 14, 1964
6	Monotony on the Bounty; Bruin Ruin; Wild Child	October 21, 1964
7	The Good Hood; Freezing Fleas; Witch Is Which	October 28, 1964
8	Stars on Mars; Stars and Gripes; Wise Quacking	November 4, 1964
9	Kooky Spook; Armoured Amour; Nautical Nitwits	November 11, 1964
10	The Island Fling; As the Snow Flies; Job Robbed	November 18, 1964
11	Courtin Trouble; Snow Biz; Unicorn on the Cob	November 25, 1964
12	Big Red Riding Hood; Unseen Trouble; Mouse Rout	December 2, 1964
13	Hurricane Hippo; Nervous in the Service; Handy Dandy Lion	December 9, 1964
14	What a Knight; Birthday Bonanza; Sappy Birthday	December 16, 1964
15	Mask Task; Wacky Waikiki; King of the Roadhogs	September 11, 1965
16	Pre-Hysterical Pete; General Nuisance; Palace Pal Panic	September 18, 1965
17	Trite Flite; Rookie Wrecker; Sleepy Time King	September 25, 1965
18	Marriage Peter Potamus Style; Noodick of the North; Pie Pie Blackbird	October 2, 1965
19	Calaboose Caboose; The Fastest Bear in the North; What the Hex Going On?	October 9, 1965
20	Eager Ogre; Snow Time Show Time; Eviction Capers	October 16, 1965
21	The Reform of Plankenstein; Goat a Go-Go; Hero Sandwiched	October 23, 1965
22	Debt and Taxes; Spy in the Ointment; Throne for a Loss	January 2, 1966
23	Wrong Time No See; All Ill Wind; Royal Rhubarb	January 9, 1966
24	America or Bust; Courtin Trouble; Nautical Nitwits	January 16, 1966
25	Rebel Rumble	January 23, 1966
26	Pilgrims Regress	January 30, 1966
27	The Crossbow Incident	February 6, 1966

== Other appearances ==
- Peter Potamus and So-So appeared in Yogi's Ark Lark and its spin-off series, Yogi's Gang. In both appearances, Butler reprised Peter Potamus.
- Peter Potamus guest starred in the episode "India and Israel" on Scooby's All-Star Laff-A-Lympics.
- Peter Potamus guest starred in some episodes of Yogi's Treasure Hunt.
- Gold Key Comics published one issue of a Peter Potamus comic book in 1965.
- Peter Potamus made a cameo appearance in The Good, the Bad, and Huckleberry Hound as a captain of a boat to Tahiti.
- Peter Potamus appeared in the early 1990s series Yo Yogi!, where he was voiced by Greg Burson. He and So-So were shown to own a plant store at Jellystone Mall called Peter Potamus' Plant Palace. In "Tricky Dickie's Dirty Trickies", he is shown to be allergic to goldenrods. He later appeared in "Mall or Nothing" as part of the Mall-a-thon.
- Peter Potamus and So-So were seen as animatronics in the Dexter's Laboratory episode "Chubby Cheese" during Chubby's song sequence.
- Potamus was also a recurring character on Harvey Birdman, Attorney at Law, where he is voiced in a Brooklyn accent by Joe Alaskey and later voiced by Chris Edgerly. In it, he is a lecherous glutton and a lazy and sleazy (but inexplicably successful) lawyer in constant pursuit of women and sandwiches. He works at the Sebben & Sebben law firm with Harvey Birdman. Peter has the trademark phrase "Did you get that thing I sent you?" Starting with the episode "Return of Birdgirl", Peter's hands were changed to hooves.
- Peter Potamus appeared in Velma Dinkley's feverish dream in issue #10 "Velma – Warrior Queen of Monsterworld!" of Scooby Apocalypse.
- Peter Potamus and So-So appeared in DC Comics' Deathstroke/Yogi Bear Special #1 as captured animals alongside other Hanna-Barbera characters. Peter was a theater director/owner in Exit Stage Left: The Snagglepuss Chronicles.
- Peter Potamus made a brief cameo in the Wacky Races episode "King Solomon's Races".
- Peter Potamus and So-So also appeared in the 2021 feature film Space Jam: A New Legacy. They are seen watching the basketball game between the Tune Squad and the Goon Squad from their balloon.
- Peter Potamus and So-So appear in the series Jellystone!, with Peter Potamus voiced by C. H. Greenblatt and So-So voiced by George Takei. Peter Potamus and So-So are portrayed as otakus; Peter is also a martial arts specialist who considers his action figures to be his friends. Though has been shown trying to hang out with the other citizens. So-So was seen as Peter's fighting coach. Peter also works as a mail carrier by using his hot air balloon. So-So was silent until the season 2 episode "Balloon Kids".
- Peter Potamus' balloon makes a cameo in the background of "The Court" map in the platform fighting game MultiVersus.
- A restaurant named "Pizza Potamus" is seen in several episodes of Aqua Teen Hunger Force, being portrayed as a dilapidated abandoned building that would frequently be destroyed in some form by the lead characters' actions; in several shots, faded and worn-out paintings of Peter Potamus are seen in the background.

== Home media ==
The episode "Fe Fi Fo Fun" is available on the DVD Saturday Morning Cartoons 1960s Vol. 1. The episode "Wagon Train Strain" is available on the Saturday Morning Cartoons 1960's Vol. 2 set. The episode "Cleo Trio" is on the Hanna Barbera 25 Cartoon Collection DVD, part of The Best of Warner Bros. series.

On November 1, 2016, Warner Archive released The Peter Potamus Show – The Complete Series on DVD in region 1 as part of their Hanna–Barbera Classics Collection. This is a manufacture-on-demand (MOD) release, available exclusively through Warner's online store and Amazon.com.

== See also ==
- List of works produced by Hanna-Barbera Productions
- List of Hanna-Barbera characters
