= The First Christmas: The Story of the First Christmas Snow =

1975 Christmas TV special

- Official on-screen logos
- Written by: Julian P. Gardner
- Directed by: Arthur Rankin, Jr. Jules Bass
- Starring: Cyril Ritchard; David Kelley; Dina Lynn; Iris Rainer; Joan Gardener
- Narrated by: Angela Lansbury
- Music by: Maury Laws
- Countries of origin: United States; Japan
- Original language: English

Production
- Producers: Arthur Rankin, Jr. Jules Bass
- Cinematography: Akikazu Kono; Ichiro Kumoro
- Editor: Irwin Goldress
- Running time: 22 minutes
- Production company: Rankin/Bass Productions

Original release
- Network: NBC
- Release: December 19, 1975

The First Christmas: The Story of the First Christmas Snow is a 1975 American-Japanese Christmas stop motion animated television special produced by Rankin/Bass Productions which originally premiered on NBC on December 19, 1975. It is narrated by Angela Lansbury and co-stars Cyril Ritchard.

== Plot ==
A few weeks before Christmas, a young shepherd named Lucas is struck by lightning while wandering the countryside with his animals, a herd of sheep and a dog named Waggles. A group of kindly nuns named Sister Theresa (the narrator), Sister Jean, and Sister Catherine rescue him, taking him to their abbey nearby and decided to take him in. Soon, they and the priest, Father Thomas, learn that he was not only been blinded by the accident, but he is also an orphan as well. Father Thomas is slightly irritated, but nevertheless, Lucas is allowed to stay at the abbey while he recovers from the accident, and Sister Theresa becomes a mentor & mother-figure to him. She tells him about snow, something neither he nor anyone else at the abbey has ever seen (the village is "much too close to the sea"). He is fascinated and begins to dream of a "white Christmas".

Later on, Father Thomas tells Sister Theresa of his plans to send Lucas to an orphanage after Christmas. Lucas overhears this and is heartbroken. In the meantime, he gets to play an angel in the abbey's Christmas pageant with some other children from the village. There, he meets a girl named Louisa, another one of the angels who immediately befriends him. He shares his dream of seeing snow for the first time with her and they start to develop feelings for each other.

On Christmas Eve, Lucas realizes that he won't be able to take his sheep and Waggles to the orphanage with him after Christmas. He tells Waggles that he has decided to give them to Sister Theresa as a Christmas present. At the same time, three mischievous boys who are in the pageant with him have been eavesdropping on him and decide to lock the sheep in a shed as a prank. Shortly afterward, though, they get out and run into the wolf-ridden forest nearby, and Lucas sets out to find them. The boys admit to Sister Theresa what they have done before following Lucas into the forest to help him. When they arrive, he has found all of them except Woolly, who has fallen into a deep hole. Lucas and the boys work together to save him, and just in time for the pageant.

At the pageant, after the children sing their song, "The First White Christmas", it begins to snow. Louisa excitedly explains this to Lucas, who is so happy that he weeps. Miraculously, Sister Theresa explains, these tears restored his sight, "not just for the moment, but for good".

After the pageant, a small party is held, where Lucas gives Sister Theresa his sheep and Waggles. She is flattered but explains to him that she wouldn't be fit to care for them and invites him to stay and live with her at the abbey to watch over them instead of going to the orphanage. Even Father Thomas agrees, saying, "I do feel that the best place for a boy with no parents is with people who love him." Lucas is thrilled and remarks that this Christmas has been the "first real, happy Christmas of [his] life".

== Cast ==
An original advertisement for the television special

- Angela Lansbury as Sister Theresa
- Cyril Ritchard as Father Thomas
- David Kelley as Lucas
- Dina Lynn as Louisa
- Iris Rainer as Sister Catherine
- Joan Gardener as Sister Jean

=== Additional cast ===
- Greg Thomas - Trickster Boy #1
- Don Messick - Waggles
- Sean Manning - Trickster Boy #2
- Hilary Momberger as Octavia
- Dru Stevens - Trickster Boy #3
- The Wee Winter Singers as the Children Chorus

== Songs ==
- Christmas Snow is Magic/Save a Little Christmas (opening version) – Children Chorus
- Save a Little Christmas – Father Thomas, Sister Theresa, Children Chorus
- Christmas Snow is Magic – Sister Theresa
- White Christmas – Lucas, Sister Theresa
- The First White Christmas – Children Chorus
- The First White Christmas (closing version) – Children Chorus

== Crew ==
- Produced and Directed by Arthur Rankin, Jr. and Jules Bass
- Written by Julian P. Gardner
- Music and Lyrics by Maury Laws and Jules Bass
- Sound: John Curcio, Don Hahn, Dave Iveland, Tom Clack
- Post Production Editing: Irwin Goldress
- "Animagic" Production Supervisors: Akikazu Kono and Ichiro Komuro
- Design: Lester Abrams
- Music Arranged and Conducted by Maury Laws

== Home media ==
The film's title actually refers to the Christmas pageant the orphan children presented on Christmas Eve, though the title could also refer to the first time Lucas actually experiences snow after his sight returns.

It originally premiered on December 19, 1975, on NBC. In later years, it aired on CBS, usually as the last Rankin/Bass special aired for the season. Freeform once aired the special each year during its "25 Days of Christmas" programming block, but AMC has now taken over broadcast rights for the special as of 2018. A VHS version is also available from ABC Video Enterprises in 1987, and Warner Home Video on October 3, 1990 in the Holiday Treasures line.

It was also released on DVD on October 2, 2012. Warner Home Video repackaged the DVD release of the special along with three of other Rankin/Bass Christmas DVDs in the 4 Kid Favorites: Merry Masterpieces box set, released on October 13, 2015.

It was also released on DVD and Blu Ray as "The Complete Rankin/Bass Christmas Collection" with all 18 Christmas specials on October 31, 2023.

== See also ==
- List of Christmas films
