= The Adventures of Spunky and Tadpole =

- Genre: Comedy
- Written by: Art Moore
- Directed by: Art Moore
- Voices of: Joan Gardner; Don Messick; Ed Janis
- Opening theme: "The Toy Shop Window" by Roger Roger
- Country of origin: United States
- Original language: English
- No. of episodes: 150

Production
- Producer: Ed Janis
- Production company: Beverly Hills Productions

Original release
- Network: Syndication
- Release: September 6, 1958 – September 9, 1961

The Adventures of Spunky and Tadpole is an animated television series produced by Beverly Hills Productions and syndicated beginning on September 6, 1958. The show's characters were a boy and a bear who hunted down bad guys. The show was made in three and a half-minute episodes, with ten parts comprising each story. It was most frequently shown one episode a day as part of a local station's afternoon children's programming. The show remained in production until September 9, 1961, airing 150 episodes.

== Marketing ==
According to Television Cartoon Shows: An Illustrated Encyclopedia, 1949 Through 2003:

Ultra-chintzy both in concept and execution... Spunky and Tadpole was given a big-bucks promotional sendoff in 1958 by its first syndicator, Guild Films. A major TV distributor of the period thanks to such valuable properties as the Liberace Show and the Warner Bros. Looney Tunes theatrical cartoons, Guild secured bookings for Spunky and Tadpole in several top markets, promising a series that would appeal equally to grownups and children. Competition from stronger syndies like Huckleberry Hound and the Three Stooges shorts caused Spunky and Tadpole to fall by the wayside, and when Guild disappeared in a merger at the end of the 1950s, the cartoons were shunted around to several minor distributors. Offered at bargain rates to less affluent stations in smaller markets, Spunky and Tadpole continued to play unobtrusively into the mid-1960s.

== Fundraising practices of the production company ==
Actress Corinne Calvet and her husband were originally vice-presidents of Beverly Hills Productions, but withdrew from the company after the shady fund-raising practices on the part of president and producer Ed Janis attracted the attention of the Better Business Bureau and were reported on by Variety.

== Voices ==
The voice cast included:

- Joan Gardner – Spunky
- Don Messick – Tadpole
- Ed Janis – Tadpole

== Episodes ==
| No. | Title | Original release date |
|---|---|---|
| 1 | "Abdul the Boo Boo" | September 6, 1958 |
| 2 | "Another Race in Outer Space!" | September 13, 1958 |
| 3 | "Doin's in the Ruins" | September 20, 1958 |
| 4 | "Prisoner of Zinda" | September 27, 1958 |
| 5 | "The Bugle Will Blow" | October 4, 1958 |
| 6 | "The Count of San Francisco" | October 11, 1958 |
| 7 | "Counterspies in Secret Guise" | October 18, 1958 |
| 8 | "A Message to Marcia" | October 25, 1958 |
| 9 | "The Mixed-Up Monster" | November 1, 1958 |
| 10 | "North Pole Caper" | November 8, 1958 |
| 11 | "Buried Treasure" | November 15, 1958 |
| 12 | "Circus Craze" | November 22, 1958 |
| 13 | "The Smugglers" | November 29, 1958 |
| 14 | "Secret of Cactus Corners" | December 6, 1958 |
| 15 | "The Frozen Planet" | December 13, 1958 |
| 16 | "The Private Eyes" | December 20, 1958 |
| 17 | "Moon Trip" | December 27, 1958 |
| 18 | "London Mystery" | January 3, 1959 |
| 19 | "Casaba Capers" | January 10, 1959 |
| 20 | "Out of Place in Outer Space" | January 17, 1959 |
| 21 | "The Oozie Wangle Story" | January 24, 1959 |
