= Joan Gardner (voice actress) =

American actress (1926–92)

- Born: November 16, 1926; Gold Coast, Chicago, Illinois, U.S.
- Died: December 10, 1992 (aged 66); Encino, California, U.S.
- Other name: Joan Janis
- Occupation: Voice actress
- Years active: 1948–1991
- Spouse: Edward Janis (m. 1960–1992)

Joan Gardner (November 16, 1926 – December 10, 1992) was an American voice actress who was most active in voice over roles. She was also a screenwriter, songwriter, author and composer.

== Early life ==
She was born in Chicago, Illinois on November 16, 1926, to Jack "Jumbo" Gardner, a prominent jazz musician and Adelaide (Cline) Gardner.

== Career ==
She started her career on the stage. In 1948–1949, she wrote scripts for the television programs Pantomime Quiz and Time For Beany.

Apart from writing scripts and books, Gardner also worked as a music composer for films. However, she was most active as an actress for radio and television animated series.

She voiced Spunky in The Adventures of Spunky and Tadpole, Tanta Kringle and various other female roles on the Christmas special Santa Claus Is Comin' to Town, Bonnie Bonnet and Madame Esmerelda on the TV special Here Comes Peter Cottontail, played Josephine Bonaparte opposite Groucho Marx's Napoleon in the animated special The Mad, Mad, Mad Comedians and Zazu the Fairy Godmother on Pound Puppies.

== Personal life ==
She married producer Edward Janis on December 8, 1960, and wrote under the name Joan Janis.

Joan Gardner died on December 10, 1992, from cancer at 66 years old.

== Filmography ==
- Pound Puppies (1986) - Zazu, the Fairy Dogmother
- Galtar and the Golden Lance (TV series) (1985) - Additional Voices (unknown episodes)
- Snorks (1984–1988) - Mrs. Wetworth
- The All-New Scooby and Scrappy-Doo Show (1983–1984) - Additional voices
- The First Easter Rabbit (1976) (TV special) - Elizabeth/Calliope
- The Story of the First Christmas Snow (1975) (TV special) aka The First Christmas (USA: video title) - Sister Jean
- Valley of the Dinosaurs (1974) - Gara
- The City That Forgot About Christmas (1974) (TV special)
- Kid Power (1972) TV series - Various Characters
- Here Comes Peter Cottontail (1971) (TV special) - Bonnie Bonnet and her store's owner/Madame Esmeralda/Mother's Day mother/disbelieving President's Day mother
- Santa Claus Is Comin' to Town (1970) - Tanta Kringle
- The Mad, Mad, Mad Comedians (1970) - Josephine Bonaparte (TV special)
- The Beach Girls and the Monster (1965) (screenwriter)
- The Famous Adventures of Mr. Magoo - Additional voices (4 episodes, 1964)
- Mister Magoo's Christmas Carol (1962) (TV special) - Tiny Tim / Ghost of Christmas Past
- Gay Purr-ee (1962) - Provence lady
- The Dick Tracy Show - Additional voices (1961–1962)
- The Adventures of Spunky and Tadpole- Spunky (2 episodes, 1958–1961)
  - "A Message to Marcia" (1958) TV episode - Spunky
  - "The Frozen Planet" (1958) TV episode - Spunky
- Time for Beany (1949) (TV series) - Additional voices (credited as Joan Janis)
