= Gloop =

Gloop may refer to:

- Gloop (The Herculoids), a character from "The Hurculoids" TV cartoon
- Augustus Gloop, a character from Charlie and the Chocolate Factory
- Great Gloop, a character from the cartoon Tom and Jerry: Blast Off to Mars

== Other ==
- G-loop, a type of topographic loop, see Isotopy of loops
