= Yippee, Yappee and Yahooey =

- Created by: William Hanna; Joseph Barbera
- Written by: William Hanna; Joseph Barbera; Jakey Benjamin-Claymar
- No. of episodes: 23

Production
- Running time: 6 minutes
- Production company: Hanna-Barbera Productions

Original release
- Network: First-run syndication
- Release: September 16, 1964 – October 23, 1966

Yippee, Yappee and Yahooey is an American animated television series produced by Hanna-Barbera Productions that premiered September 16, 1964. It was presented as a segment of The Peter Potamus Show, along with Breezly and Sneezly and Peter Potamus.

== Plot ==
Yippee, Yappee and Yahooey are dogs who serve the king as his royal guards. They are usually called the goofy guards by the king. They must always protect, serve and obey the King. They are loosely based on the Three Musketeers.

The King doesn't like calling them, due to their incompetence the King ends up being accidentally hurt, bruised, squashed, and involved in various disasters in each episode. At times, the three heroes find themselves fighting a fire-breathing dragon and other villains. A common mistake in nearly every short is that Yippee, Yappee and Yahooey's voices tend to get mixed up with one another.

== Meaning of the name ==
Irving Berlin wrote a stage show while in the Army during World War I entitled "Yip Yip Yaphank" at Camp Yaphank from which names were taken for this cartoon. Yahooey spoke very much like Jerry Lewis.

== Episode list ==
The show had 23 episodes of 6 minutes each.

#	Title	Summary
1	The Volunteers	Yippee, Yappee and Yahooey are trained by Sergeant to become soldiers, but their clumsiness becomes too much for the Sergeant and eventually makes the King mad.
2	Black Bart	Yippee, Yappee and Yahooey get fired by the King for overuse of his money on things like sword polish. But they get their jobs back when they unwittingly keep him away from the notorious highwayman Black Bart, who is mistaken by the King for Yahooey.
3	Double Dragon	Yippee, Yappee and Yahooey disguise themselves as a dragon so that the King can pretend to battle it. But their plan backfires when a real dragon shows up.
4	Outlaw In-Law	The King's nephew visits the palace, and the bumbling guards are tasked with teaching him how to be a royal guard. Predictably, they struggle to impart much wisdom without creating chaos.
5	Horse Shoo Fly	The King receives a gift: a flying horse. However, the gift turns problematic, and Yippee, Yappee and Yahooey must try to save the King (and control the horse) amid their usual bungling.
6	Wild Child	While the King and Queen are away for the evening, Yippee, Yappee and Yahooey are left in charge of babysitting their unruly child. Chaos ensues.
7	Witch is Which?	A witch casts a spell that transforms the King into a frog. The trio set out to find the witch and convince her to restore the King to his human form.
8	Wise Quacking	The King and the guards go duck hunting.
9	Nautical Nitwits	--With only a one-ship Navy, the King and the Guards battle notorious pirate Captain Kidder
10	Job Robbed	Fed up with the guards' incompetence, the King replaces them with a robotic guard. At first, the robot appears effective, but eventually it goes haywire, creating more trouble for the kingdom.
11	Unicorn on the Cob	The King hires Yippie, Yappee, and Yahooey to help him catch a unicorn.
12	Mouse Rout	A small mouse steals the King's royal items. The guards are summoned to catch the thief, but their bumbling ways make the job harder than it should be.
13	Handy Dandy Lion	The King orders a lion skin rug for the Queen and sends the guards to hunt a lion. But their “hunt” doesn't go as planned.
14	Sappy Birthday	It's the King's birthday. The guards plan a celebration, but a villain tries to spoil the day.
15	King of the Roadhogs	
16	Palace Pal Panic	
17	Sleepy Time King	
18	Pie Pie Blackbird	The King tasks the guards with collecting 24 blackbirds to make a pie for the Queen. The guards chase after the birds, but struggle to catch even one.
19	What the Hex Going On?	A wizard transforms the King into a kangaroo, and the guards must rescue him from the chaos of his new form.
20	Eviction Capers	While the King goes into his royal pool, a seal (from a traveling sideshow) lands beneath him, causing disruption. The guards are then tasked with removing the seal and restoring order.
21	Hero Sandwiched	The King is turned into a superhero (via a wizard's spell). The guards are assigned to protect and assist him in his new role, but their ineptitude leads to more comic trouble.
22	Throne for a Loss	The King goes on a camping trip. The three guards follow along to protect him, but their efforts cause a mess in the wilderness and challenges.
23	Royal Rhubarb	A neighboring kingdom invades (citing perpetual rain in their territory). They send a giant mechanical knight. Yippee, Yappee and Yahooey must defend their King and kingdom, and though they face mechanical odds, they ultimately prevail.

== Voice cast ==
- Doug Young – Yippee
- Hal Smith – Yappee, The King
- Daws Butler – Yahooey

== DVD release ==
The episode "The Volunteers" is available on the DVD Saturday Morning Cartoons 1960's vol. 1. The episode "Black Bart" is available on the DVD Saturday Morning Cartoons 1960's vol. 2.

== Pop culture ==
In the later animated TV series Animaniacs, the character Slappy Squirrel claims Yakko, Wakko, and Dot remind her of a young Yippee, Yappee and Yahooey. The Warners look puzzled, and Dot said she does not know who they are, or what she meant by that statement.

Yippee, Yappee and Yahooey appear in Jellystone!, with Yippee played by Jim Conroy, Yappee by Grace Helbig, and Yahooey by C. H. Greenblatt. Yappee is female in the show and her hair was changed from black to brown, with the spelling of her name changed to "Yappy". Yippee and Yahooey's names were also swapped.

== Yippee, Yappee and Yahooey in other languages ==
- Italian: Tippete, Tappete, Toppete
- Portuguese: Mosquete, Mosquito e Moscato
- Spanish: Viva, Bravo y Hurra
