= The Magilla Gorilla Show =

American animated television series

- Genre: Comedy
- Created by: William Hanna; Joseph Barbera
- Written by: Warren Foster; Michael Maltese; Dalton Sandifer
- Directed by: William Hanna; Joseph Barbera
- Voices of: Allan Melvin; Howard Morris; Jean Vander Pyl; Don Messick; Mel Blanc
- Theme music composer: Hoyt Curtin
- Composer: Hoyt Curtin
- Country of origin: United States
- Original language: English
- No. of episodes: 31

Production
- Executive producers: William Hanna; Joseph Barbera
- Producers: William Hanna; Joseph Barbera
- Production company: Hanna-Barbera Productions

Original release
- Network: Syndicated; ABC
- Release: January 15, 1964 – December 30, 1967

The Magilla Gorilla Show is an American animated television series starring Magilla Gorilla. The series was produced by Hanna-Barbera Productions for Screen Gems, and was originally sponsored in syndication by Ideal Toys from 1964 through 1967. The show had other recurring characters, including Ricochet Rabbit & Droop-a-Long and Punkin' Puss & Mushmouse. In syndication, the main and supporting characters from The Peter Potamus Show were also added. Like many of Hanna-Barbera's animal characters, Magilla Gorilla was dressed in human accessories, sporting a bow tie, shorts held up by suspenders, and an undersized derby hat.

Prior to the show's launch, a half-hour documentary featuring the Hanna-Barbera studio and promoting the upcoming new series aired in December 1963 as a first-run syndication TV special entitled Here Comes A Star. After a year on airing its original runs, repeats of all 31 episodes were aired between 1966 and 1967 during ABC-TV's Saturday morning schedule and on Sunday mornings the following season.

The show aired on Boomerang until July 22, 2012. After an eight-year wait, The Magilla Gorilla Show returned on Boomerang for four days during November 26 until November 30, 2020 including the opening and closing themes and titles. During the four-day broadcast, neither Punkin' Puss & Mushmouse nor Ricochet Rabbit & Droop-a-long were aired.

== Segments ==
=== Magilla Gorilla ===
Magilla Gorilla (voiced by Allan Melvin) is an anthropomorphic western lowland gorilla who spent his time languishing in the front display window of a pet shop run by Melvin Peebles (voiced by Howard Morris in 1964–1965, and Don Messick in 1966-1967), eating bananas and being a drain on the businessman's finances. Mr. Peebles marked down Magilla's price considerably, but Magilla was invariably only purchased for a short time...for example, by thieves who needed to break into a bank or by an advertising agency looking for a mascot for their new product. The customers always ended up returning Magilla, forcing Mr. Peebles to refund their money. Magilla often ended each episode with his catchphrase "We'll try again next week." Magilla's only friend was an adorable, admiring little red headed girl named Ogee (voiced by Jean Vander Pyl), who asked "How much is that gorilla in the window?" during the show's opening theme song.

=== Ricochet Rabbit & Droop-a-Long ===
Ricochet Rabbit (voiced by Don Messick) works as the sheriff of Hoop N' Holler with his slow as molasses deputy Droop-a-Long Coyote (voiced by Mel Blanc). In addition to his super-speed, Ricochet Rabbit uses an arsenal of trick bullets (for example, one with a skull bashing mallet that pops out of the shell) to help him take down criminals. He would introduce himself as "Sheriff Ping! Ping! Pinnnng! Ricochet Rabbit!"

=== Punkin' Puss & Mushmouse ===
In a send up of the feuding Hatfields and McCoys, an orange hillbilly cat named Punkin' Puss (voiced by Allan Melvin) is constantly chasing a hard-to-catch hillbilly mouse named Mushmouse (voiced by Howard Morris). Punkin' Puss' weapon of choice is a shotgun.

== Syndication ==
The show made its first premiere on January 15, 1964, in first-run syndication. When The Magilla Gorilla Show first aired on television, the show was not broadcast on the same day of the week or the same time, in every city's affiliation. For its original run until 1965 in syndication, some of the major markets in cities such as New York City, Los Angeles, San Francisco, Chicago, Indianapolis, and Dallas aired The Magilla Gorilla Show on independent stations, such as WPIX, KCOP, KTVU, WGN, WTTV, and KTVT. Overlands and overseas, the show aired on CBC Television in Canada at the time since its debut; and in Australia, The Magilla Gorilla Show didn't air in Australia until April 6, 1965, when Network TEN ran the entire series. Beginning in 1966, new episodes and reruns of the earlier episodes then began airing on ABC's Saturday Morning schedule until its last run on December 30, 1967. In Canada and Australia, the show continued its reruns until 1969. After the reruns were mostly canceled in America, only a few stations continued their portion to rerun The Magilla Gorilla Show. Chicago's WFLD once carried The Magilla Gorilla Show during the early-1980s in their morning schedule, and one of the longest-running stations to air The Magilla Gorilla Show, New York City's WPIX, continued to rerun The Magilla Gorilla Show for more than a decade until 1984. At the time, no local station in America has aired them since then. Apparently in the United Kingdom, Yorkshire Television reran the series in the early 1980s; and in Australia, Nine Network reran the show during the mid-1980s. Both channels reran The Magilla Gorilla Show for a short period of time. Back in America, the show was then returned on cable-only USA Network later on during the decade, and Cartoon Network began running the series when it launched years later on October 1, 1992. Cartoon Network's run lasted until 2004 due to its sister station Boomerang at the time airing the show since Boomerang's early years. Boomerang continued to air The Magilla Gorilla Show until July 22, 2012. The show made a return on November 26, 2020 for four days until November 30, 2020, on a Boomerang Thanksgiving weekend containing episodes of various classic Hanna-Barbera shows. During the run, both Punkin' Puss & Mushmouse or Ricochet Rabbit & Droop-a-Long segments were not aired during the four-day period; which was replaced by another Magilla Gorilla segment to fill the schedule instead, with both opening theme and closing theme/credits intact throughout every segment. Out of the 31 Magilla Gorilla segments in total, only 20 of them were aired. In 2024 it was announced that The Magilla Gorilla Show would be begin airing on MeTV Toons.

== Cast ==
- Allan Melvin – Magilla Gorilla, Punkin' Puss
- Howard Morris – Mr. Peebles (1964–1965), Mushmouse
- Don Messick – Mr. Peebles (1966–1967), Ricochet Rabbit
- Mel Blanc – Droop-a-Long Coyote and other additional voices
- Jean Vander Pyl – Ogee and other additional voices
- Daws Butler - Additional voices
- Hal Smith - Additional voices

== Home media ==
The episode "Come Blow Your Dough" was released as part of the "A Sample of Boomerang" tape, from Cartoon Network's sister channel, Boomerang.

Warner Home Video released the Classic Collection of the Magilla Gorilla Show consisting of 31 episodes of Magilla Gorilla, together with the 23 Ricochet Rabbit & Droop-a-Long and 23 Punkin' Puss & Mushmouse shorts in a boxed DVD collection on August 15, 2006. The DVD set does not include the original Magilla Gorilla Show main/end title sequences and the cartoons are not restored, drawing heavy criticism from fans.

A "Diamond Collection" of the complete series was released on June 6, 2017. All 23 Ricochet Rabbit and all 23 Punkin' Puss shorts are included as they were on the previous release. The opening and closing titles are still not included.

On February 6, 2025, Warner Archive announced that they would be releasing a complete series blu-ray box set of the show on March 25, 2025. This set fully restores the series and adds the opening and closing titles back.

DVD name	Ep #	Release date	Additional information
Classic Collection	31	August 15, 2006	unrestored, no opening theme/end credits; Magilla Theme Song, Live and Unplugged; Mr. Peebles Pet Shop; Here Comes a Star
Diamond Collection	23	June 6, 2017	remastered, no opening theme/end credits; Magilla Theme Song, Live and Unplugged; Mr. Peebles Pet Shop; Here Comes a Star

== See also ==
- List of works produced by Hanna-Barbera Productions
- List of Hanna-Barbera characters
