= Ricochet Rabbit & Droop-a-Long =

Cartoon characters

- Ricochet Rabbit & Droop-a-Long's title card
- Genre: Comedy; Western
- Created by: Hanna-Barbera
- Directed by: William Hanna; Joseph Barbera
- Voices of: Don Messick; Mel Blanc
- Theme music composer: Hoyt Curtin
- Country of origin: United States
- Original language: English
- No. of seasons: 2
- No. of episodes: 23

Production
- Producers: William Hanna; Joseph Barbera
- Running time: 7 minutes
- Production company: Hanna-Barbera Productions

Original release
- Network: First-run Syndication
- Release: January 14, 1964 – December 4, 1966

Related
- The Magilla Gorilla Show; The Peter Potamus Show

Ricochet Rabbit & Droop-a-Long was a segment of Hanna-Barbera's 1964–66 cartoon The Magilla Gorilla Show, and later appeared on The Peter Potamus Show.

== Background ==
In a Wild West setting, a cowboy rabbit named Ricochet Rabbit (voiced by Don Messick) worked as a sheriff in the town of Hoop 'n' Holler. Ricochet would bounce off stationary objects yelling "Bing-bing-bing!" His deputy and foil Droop-a-Long Coyote (voiced by Mel Blanc impersonating Ken Curtis on Gunsmoke) was not as fast and was very clumsy.

In addition to his speed, which enabled him to outrun bullets, Ricochet used trick bullets against his opponents, including a bullet that would stop in mid-flight and strike the target with an impossibly oversized mallet, and another which would draw a target on his nose and punch it.

== Episode list ==
#	Title	Airdate	Summary	Animator
1	Atchison, Topeka & Sam Jose	January 14, 1964		
2	Good Little Bad Guy	January 21, 1964		Credited Animators: Kenneth Muse, George Goepper
3	Cradle Robber	January 28, 1964		Credited Animators: Kenneth Muse, George Goepper
4	West Pest	February 4, 1964		Credited Animators: George Goepper, Kenneth Muse
5	TV Show	February 11, 1964		Credited Animators: George Goepper, Kenneth Muse
6	Annie Hoaxley	February 18, 1964		Credited Animators: Kenneth Muse, George Goepper
7	School Daze	February 25, 1964		Credited Animator: Irv Spence
8	Sheepy Wolf	March 3, 1964		Credited Animators: George Nicholas, George Goepper
9	Big Thinker	March 10, 1964		Credited Animators: Jerry Hathcock, Ed Parks, Don Patterson
10	Two Too Many	March 17, 1964		Credited Animators: George Nicholas, George Goepper
11	Bad Guys Are Good Guys	March 24, 1964		
12	Itchy-Finger Gun Slinger	March 31, 1964		
13	Clunko Bunko	April 7, 1964		
14	Slick Quick Gun	April 14, 1964		
15	Mostly Ghostly	April 21, 1964		Credited Animators: Jerry Hathcock, Kenneth Muse
16	Will O' the Whip	September 11, 1965		
17	Cactus Ruckus	September 18, 1965		Credited Animators: Carlo Vinci, Hugh Fraser
18	Rapid Romance	September 25, 1965		
19	El Loco, Loco, Loco, Loco Diablo	October 2, 1965		
20	Big Town Show Down	October 9, 1965		
21	Space Sheriff	October 16, 1965		
22	Red Riding Ricochet	October 23, 1965		
23	Jail Break-In	October 30, 1965		

== Cast ==
- Don Messick as Ricochet Rabbit
- Mel Blanc as Droop-a-Long Coyote

== Other appearances ==
- An early incarnation of Ricochet Rabbit appears in Touché Turtle and Dum Dum episode 26 "Rapid Rabbit".
- Ricochet Rabbit and Droop-a-Long were seen in Yogi's Ark Lark.
- Ricochet Rabbit and Droop-a-Long were seen in the opening title of Yogi's Gang.
- Ricochet Rabbit made some appearances in Yogi's Treasure Hunt.
- Ricochet Rabbit makes a portrait cameo in the "Agent Penny" episode of the "Super Secret Secret Squirrel" segment of 2 Stupid Dogs.
- Ricochet Rabbit appears in the Harvey Birdman, Attorney at Law episode "X Gets the Crest", voiced by Mark Hamill. Droop-a-Long also makes a non-speaking cameo.
- Ricochet Rabbit appears in the Wacky Races reboot episode "Slow and Steady", voiced by Tom Kenny.

== In other languages ==
- Italian: Tornado Kid e Sonnacchia
- French: Ricochet-Va-Vite et Lambinousse
- Dutch: Sheriff Altijd Raak Hebbes

== See also ==
- List of works produced by Hanna-Barbera Productions
- List of Hanna-Barbera characters
