= Wacky Races (2017 TV series) =

American animated television series

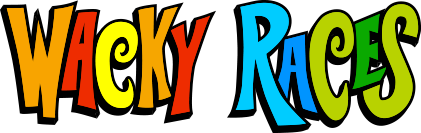
- Genre: Comedy
- Based on: Wacky Races by Hanna-Barbera and Heatter-Quigley
- Developed by: Rebecca Himot; Tramm Wigzell
- Voices of: Peter Woodward; Billy West; Nicole Parker; Diedrich Bader; Tom Kenny; Jill Talley; Christopher Judge
- Theme music composer: Hoyt Curtin
- Composers: Michael McCuistion; Lolita Ritmanis; Kristopher Carter; Kevin Riepl
- Country of origin: United States
- Original language: English
- No. of seasons: 2
- No. of episodes: 78 (list of episodes)

Production
- Executive producer: Sam Register
- Producers: Mike Disa; Jeff Siergey
- Editor: Craig Paulsen
- Running time: 11 minutes
- Production companies: Warner Bros. Animation; Hanna-Barbera Cartoons

Original release
- Network: Boomerang
- Release: August 14, 2017 – November 24, 2019

Related
- Wacky Races (1968); Dastardly and Muttley in Their Flying Machines; The Perils of Penelope Pitstop; Fender Bender 500

Wacky Races is an American crossover animated comedy television series developed by Rebecca Himot and Tramm Wigzell. It is a reboot/revival/remake series, but serves as a sequel to the 1968–69 Hanna-Barbera animated series of the same name as the second and third seasons overall. The show debuted in 2017 on Boomerang's video on demand service in the United States. The second season of the show premiered on November 29, 2018.

== Summary ==
The series features the return of some of the characters from the original Wacky Races program: Dick Dastardly, Muttley, Penelope Pitstop, Peter Perfect and the Gruesome Twosome. More than half of the original characters do not return. Several new characters were introduced, including new racer I. Q. Ickly, announcer Brick Crashman, racing sponsor P. T. Barnstorm, and Penelope's twin sister Pandora Pitstop.

While the reboot is based on the original series, it also focuses on the Racers' personal lives; storylines are added and there usually is no actual winner or loser at the end of each race. There is also meta-humor and fourth wall breaking.

== Characters ==
=== Main ===
- Dick Dastardly the Third and Muttley (voiced by Peter Woodward and Billy West): In this modern series, Dick Dastardly is still up to his usual trickery and cheating activities, though is now often badgered into either being nice or not cheating by Peter Perfect. Unlike before, his appearance is predominantly purple in color instead of blue, red and purple. Muttley, however, has undergone virtually no changes aside from his outward appearance, still either snickering or grumbling. In "Mother Drives Best", it is revealed that Dick Dastardly is actually the son of Dick Dastardly the Second from the original Wacky Races series, and Delilah Dastardly, who taught her own son how to cheat. In "Grandfather Knows Dast", his grandfather is revealed to be Dick Dastardly the First from Dastardly and Muttley in Their Flying Machines.
- Penelope Pitstop (voiced by Nicole Parker): Another original character, Penelope Pitstop has undergone the most changes from the original, both in appearance and outlook. While more assertive and much less of a damsel in distress than the original, she is still often the goody-two-shoes of the group and still talks like a Southern belle. Like before, her appearance is predominantly pink with hearts.
- Peter Perfect (voiced by Diedrich Bader): Like Dastardly and Muttley, largely unchanged from the original, although he is a bit more taunting of Dastardly and his intelligence has been drastically reduced. His appearance is predominantly orange and red.
- Tiny and Bella – the Gruesome Twosome (voiced by Billy West and Tom Kenny) are the other characters from the original series, and are the closest to their original versions in almost every respect.
- Ignatius Quinton "I. Q." Ickly (voiced by Jill Talley): Often called a "walking encyclopaedia" by Dastardly, this new character has underdeveloped social skills. Like Professor Pat Pending before him, he is a genius inventor who uses gadgets throughout the race. Only 10 years old, he cannot drive legally and uses a car with onboard artificial intelligence that frequently misunderstands his verbal commands.

=== Secondary ===
==== Racers ====
- Pandora Pitstop (voiced by Nicole Parker): A new character. Penelope's twin sister and frequent guest Racer. She is similar to Penelope, except her outfit is predominantly purple and is often meaner and more underhanded than even Dastardly. She often allies with Dastardly, but usually for her own ends.
- Captain Dash, Polly, Bugsy, Bluebeard and Davey Bones (voiced by Billy West and Tom Kenny): A gang of pirates that often steal gigs from Dastardly. They are similar to the Anthill Mob from the original Wacky Races.

==== Non-racers ====
- Brick Crashman (voiced by Christopher Judge): A former racer and the enthusiastic announcer for the Wacky Races. He often changes his appearance or character to match the location of the episode's racecourse, and is at a loss as to what to do when there is no actual race happening in an episode.
- Pearl Tricia "P. T." Barnstorm (voiced by Jill Talley): The owner and sponsor for the Wacky Races. A diminutive old woman with a southern drawl who claims to be concerned with the racer's well-being, but in truth only cares about their profitability.

==== Guest stars ====
- Hooded Claw (voiced by Tom Kenny impersonating Paul Lynde)
- Huckleberry Hound (voiced by Billy West): a guest racer and Peter Perfect's stunt double
- Snagglepuss (voiced by Billy West and Tom Kenny)
- Hong Kong Phooey (voiced by Phil LaMarr)
- Quick Draw McGraw (voiced by Billy West)
- Touché Turtle (voiced by Billy West): a guest racer
- Ricochet Rabbit (voiced by Tom Kenny): a guest racer.
- The Dalton Brothers
  - Dinky Dalton (voiced by Christopher Judge)
  - Finky Dalton (voiced by Tom Kenny)
  - Pinky Dalton (voiced by Diedrich Bader)
  - Stinky Dalton (voiced by Billy West)
- Winsome Witch (voiced by Nicole Parker): a guest racer.
- Paw and Maw Rugg (voiced by Billy West and Jill Talley)
- Mildew Wolf (voiced by Tom Kenny)
- Magilla Gorilla
- Scooby-Doo
- Scrappy-Doo (voiced by Tom Kenny): Scooby-Doo's nephew
- Mr. Jinks (voiced by Billy West)
- Jabberjaw (voiced by Billy West)
- Chief (voiced by Billy West)
- Top Cat
- Benny the Ball

== Episodes ==
Season	Episodes	Originally released	
Season	Episodes	First released	Last released
1	40	August 14, 2017	May 31, 2018
2	38	November 29, 2018	November 24, 2019

== Broadcast ==
Wacky Races premiered internationally in 2017. The first episode was released on Boomerang's SVOD service in the United States on August 14, 2017. The other 11 episodes were released on August 31, 2017.

The series was first shown on television in the United States on the Boomerang channel, with the episode "Under the Rainbow" airing on Boomerang as a preview on February 22, 2018, and the series officially premiering on the Boomerang channel on May 21, 2018, alongside another show from Boomerang's SVOD service, Dorothy and the Wizard of Oz.

The series aired as a repeat starting on Cartoon Network on August 13, 2018.

== Home video ==
Start Your Engines!, a DVD release containing the first 10 episodes of the series, was released on April 24, 2018.
